= Danon Fantasy =

Japanese Thoroughbred racehorse

Danon Fantasy; ダノンファンタジー
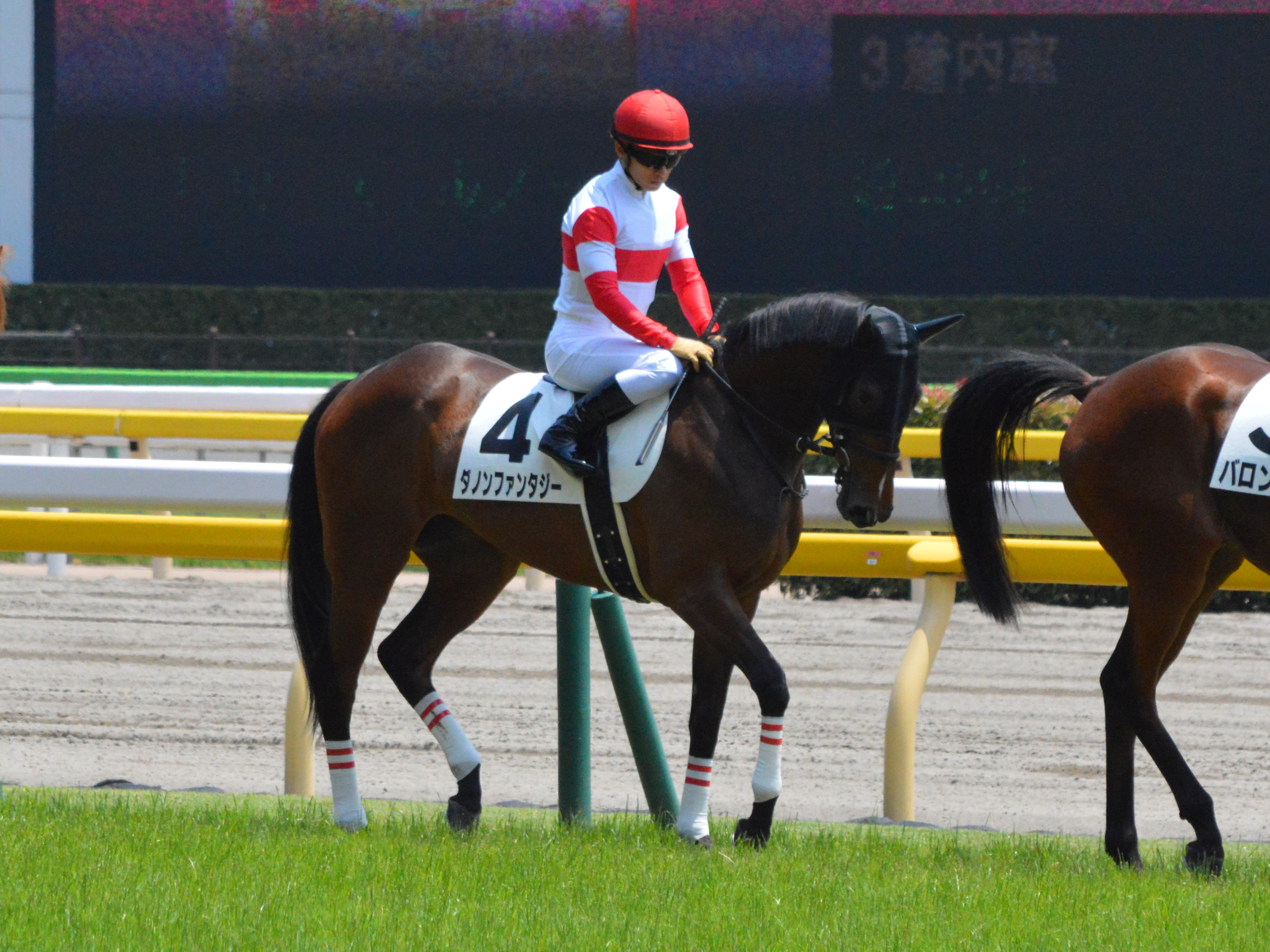
- Danon Fantasy on her racecourse debut
- Sire: Deep Impact
- Grandsire: Sunday Silence
- Dam: Life For Sale
- Damsire: Not For Sale
- Sex: Mare
- Foaled: 30 January 2016
- Country: Japan
- Colour: Bay
- Breeder: Northern Farm
- Owner: Danox Co Ltd
- Racing colours
- Trainer: Mitsumasa Nakauchida
- Jockey: Yuga Kawada; Yusuke Fujioka
- Record: 18: 7-1-1
- Earnings: ¥401,901,000

Major wins
- Fantasy Stakes (2018); Hanshin Juvenile Fillies (2018); Tulip Sho (2019); Rose Stakes (2019); Hanshin Cup (2020); Swan Stakes (2021)

Awards
- JRA Award for Best Two-Year-Old Filly (2018)
- Last updated on 31 January 2026

Danon Fantasy (Japanese: ダノンファンタジー, foaled 30 January 2016) is a Japanese Thoroughbred racehorse and broodmare. After finishing second in her first appearance as a two-year-old in 2018 she won her three remaining races that year including the Fantasy Stakes and Hanshin Juvenile Fillies and took the JRA Award for Best Two-Year-Old Filly. In the following year, she won the Tulip Sho and the Rose Stakes. In 2020 she was well beaten in her first three races but ended the year with a win in the Hanshin Cup.

== Background ==
Danon Fantasy is a bay mare with a narrow white blaze bred in Hokkaido by Northern Farm. As a yearling in 2017 she was consigned to the Select Sale and was bought for ¥97,200,000 by Danox Co Ltd. She was sent into training with Mitsumasa Nakauchida.

She was from the ninth crop of foals sired by Deep Impact, who was the Japanese Horse of the Year in 2005 and 2006, winning races including the Tokyo Yushun, Tenno Sho, Arima Kinen and Japan Cup. Deep Impact's other progeny include Gentildonna, Harp Star, Kizuna, A Shin Hikari, Marialite and Saxon Warrior. Danon Fantasy's dam Life For Sale was a top class racehorse in Argentina where she won twice at Group 1 level before being exported to Japan at the end of her track career. She was a female-line descendant of Roussette (foaled 1941), a British mare who was exported to Brazil.

== Racing career ==
=== 2018: two-year-old season ===
Danon Fantasy made her first appearance on 3 June in a contest for previously unraced juveniles over 1600 metres at Tokyo Racecourse and finished second of the fifteen runners behind Gran Alegria. After a break of more than three months she returned for a maiden race over the same distance at Hanshin Racecourse and recorded her first success as she won by two lengths from Red Vita and seven others.

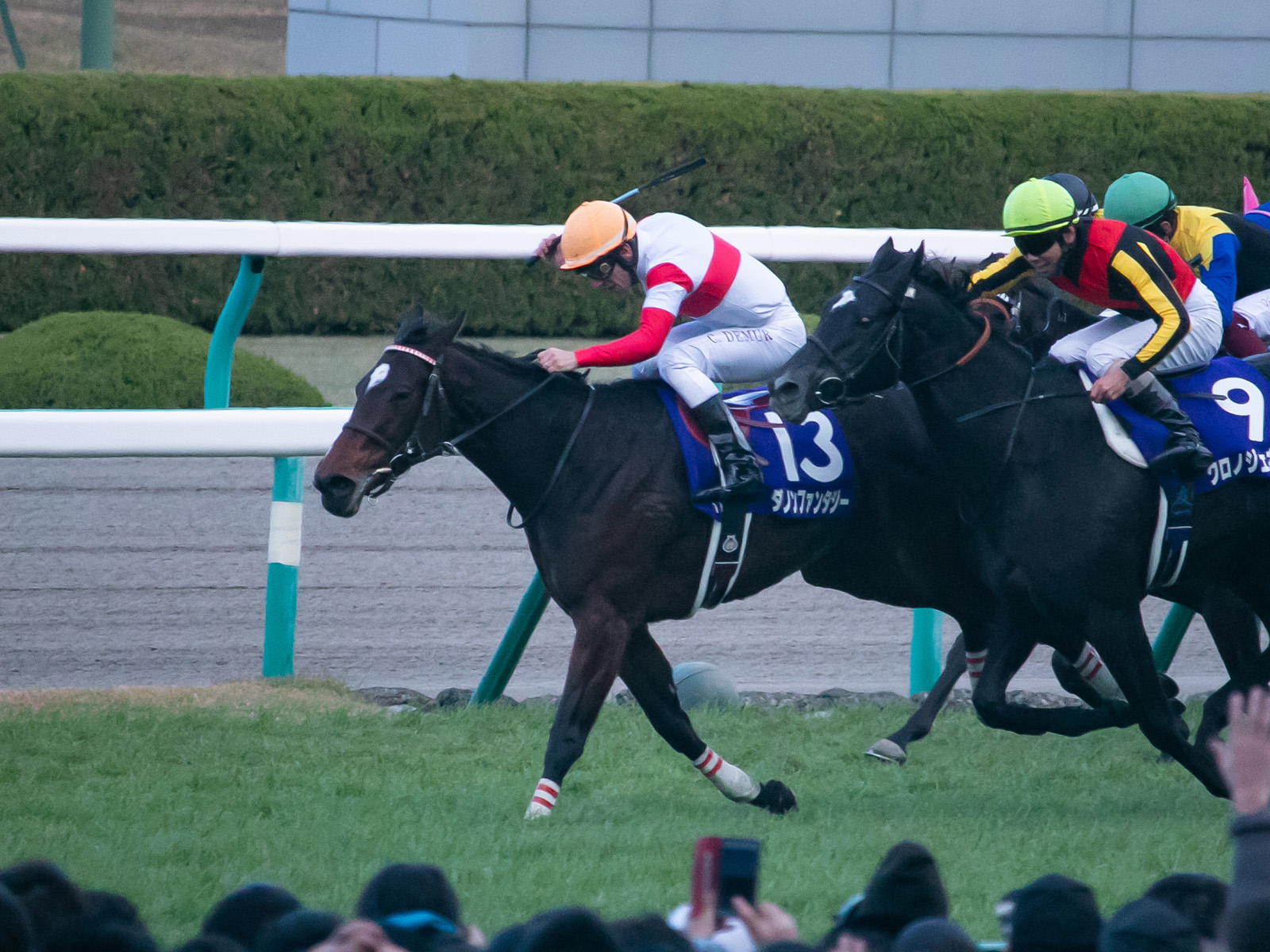
Danon Fantasy beats Chrono Genesis in the Hanshin Juvenile Fillies

On 3 November Danon Fantasy was stepped up in class for the Grade 3 Fantasy Stakes over 1400 metres at Kyoto Racecourse and started the 1/2 favourite in a nine-runner field. Ridden by Yuga Kawada she won by one and three quarter lengths from Belle Soeurs. As Kawada was booked to ride at the Hong Kong International meeting, the filly was partnered by Cristian Demuro on 9 December when she was moved up to Group 1 level for the Hanshin Juvenile Fillies over 1600 metres. She started the 1.6/1 favourite ahead of Chrono Genesis in an eighteen-runner field which also included Schon Glanz and Beach Samba who had finished first and second in the Artemis Stakes. Belle Soeurs set the early pace from Meisho Shobu with Danon Fantasy being settled towards the rear before being switched towards the wide outside on the final turn and making rapid progress. Meisho Shobu took the lead in the straight but Danon Fantasy gained the advantage 100 metres from the finish and repelled the challenge of Chrono Genesis to win by half a length, with Beach Samba a neck away in third place. After the race Demuro commented "The filly was relaxed and when I saw the second favorite come outside us after the fourth corner, I told her it's time to go, we have to fight, and she responded really well. She responds very quickly and has a very good turn of foot. She's a good horse and I think she will have a very good chance in the Oka Sho next year".

In the official ratings for Japanese two-year-olds, Danon Fantasy was rated the best juvenile filly of the year, one pound ahead of Chrono Genesis and five pounds below the top-rated colt Admire Mars. In January 2019 Danon Fantasy topped the poll for Best Two-Year-Old Filly at the JRA Awards for 2018, receiving 275 of the 276 votes.

=== 2019: three-year-old season ===
Danon Fantasy began her second campaign in the Tulip Sho (a major trial for the Oka Sho) at Hanshin on 2 March and started odds-on favourite against twelve opponents headed by Schon Glanz and Meisho Shobu. With Kawada in the saddle she settled in third place before taking the lead in the straight and won by a length from Shigeru Pink Dia. Her assistant trainer commented "she got into a good early position and was able to settle well. She had to be switched to the outside on the run for home, but accelerated well to go on and win". On 7 April the filly started the 1.8/1 favourite for the 79th edition of the Oka Sho at Hanshin. She tracked the leaders for most of the way and kept on well in the straight but was beaten into fourth place behind Gran Alegria, Shigeru Pink Dia and Chrono Genesis. Danon Fantasy was stepped up in trip to contest the Yushun Himba at Tokyo on 19 May over 2400 metres, a distance which Kawada admitted would be unlikely to suit her. She started at odds of 5.4/1 and came home fifth of the eighteen runners behind Loves Only You, Curren Bouquetd'Or, Chrono Genesis and Victoria.

After a break of almost four months Danon Fantasy returned to the track for the Rose Stakes (a trial for the Shuka Sho) over 1800 metres at Hanshin on 15 September. Ridden by Kawada she started the 1.2/1 favourite ahead of eleven opponents and won by a neck and a head from Beach Samba and Victoria in a race record time of 1:44.4. In the Shuka Sho over 2000 metres at Kyoto on 13 October Danon Fantasy started the 2.5/1 favourite but after racing in third place for most of the way she dropped from contention in the straight and came home eighth of the seventeen runners behind Chrono Genesis, beaten seven lengths by the winner.

=== 2020: four-year-old season ===
Danon Fantasy remained in training as a four-year-old and began her campaign by finishing fifth when favourite for the Grade 2 Hanshin Himba Stakes on 11 April. In the following month she returned to Group 1 class and ran fifth behind Almond Eye in the Victoria Mile at Tokyo. After a five month break she returned to the track for the Fuchu Himba Stakes at Tokyo and came home sixth of the eight runners.

On 26 December, Danon Fantasy ended her campaign in the Grade 2 Hanshin Cup over 1400 metres in which she was matched against male opposition and started the 8.6/1 fourth choice in the betting behind Indy Champ, Stelvio (2018 Mile Championship) and Fiano Romano. Ridden by Yusuke Fujioka she raced in third place behind Iberis before taking the lead in the straight, breaking clear of her rivals and winning by one and three quarter lengths.

=== 2021: five-year-old season ===
She started her season in the Hankyu Hai this time. She was the second favourite for this race behind Resistencia. She ended up finishing in fifth place in the race, 0.6 seconds off the lead. In her next race which was the Takamatsunomiya Kinen, she positioned well on the second place but gassed out near the end and fell back to 12th-place at the line. Then, she ran again for the Victoria Mile in Tokyo. This time, she roamed along the back of the pack at 14th-position before securing a clear path and accelerating on final 300 meters to snatch seventh-place.

She then took a break in the summer and started the autumn campaign in the Swan Stakes, a 1400 meters race in Hanshin on October 30. In this race, Danon Fantasy ran well in the middle pack before switching to the outside of the track and sprinted towards the finish for her six graded race win in her career. Nakauchida said that Hanshin Racecourse was her forte and a big reason for this win whilst her jockey, Yuga Kawada commented that the race was win based on nailing the good start and gathering a good momentum for the win. Her final race of the season would be the Hanshin Cup, the race she won the previous season. She finished the race in third place 1.5 lengths behind the winner, Grenadier Guards. According to his jockey for this race, Fujioka stated that "She was able to get a good start but she was pushed inside slightly in the middle phase. Regardless of that situation, Danon Fantasy still able to push through at the end but the winning horse had the better legs."

On January 14th, 2022, Danon Fantasy retired as a racehorse and being assigned as broodmare at the Northern Farm. Her racehorse registration also was revoked on the same day.

== Racing form ==
Danon Fantasy won seven races out of 18 starts. This data is available in JBIS and netkeiba.

Date	Track	Race	Grade	Distance (Condition)	Entry	HN	Odds (Favored)	Finish	Time	Margins	Jockey	Winner (Runner-up)
2018 – two-year-old season
Jun 3	Tokyo	2yo Newcomer		1,600 m (Firm)	15	4	2.9 (2)	2nd	1:33.9	0.3	Yuga Kawada	Gran Alegria
Sep 16	Hanshin	2yo Maiden		1,600 m (Firm)	9	7	1.3 (1)	1st	1:35.9	–0.3	Yuga Kawada	(Red Vita)
Nov 3	Kyoto	Fantasy Stakes	3	1,400 m (Firm)	9	4	1.5 (1)	1st	1:21.8	–0.3	Yuga Kawada	(Belles Soeurs)
Dec 9	Hanshin	Hanshin Juvenile Fillies	1	1,600 m (Firm)	18	13	2.6 (1)	1st	1:34.1	–0.1	Cristian Demuro	(Chrono Genesis)
2019 – three-year-old season
Mar 2	Hanshin	Tulip Sho	2	1,600 m (Firm)	13	1	1.3 (1)	1st	1:34.1	–0.2	Yuga Kawada	(Shigeru Pink Dia)
Apr 7	Hanshin	Oka Sho	1	1,600 m (Firm)	18	15	2.8 (1)	4th	1:33.1	0.4	Yuga Kawada	Gran Alegria
May 19	Tokyo	Yushun Himba	1	2,400 m (Firm)	18	8	6.4 (4)	5th	2:23.3	0.5	Yuga Kawada	Loves Only You
Sep 15	Hanshin	Rose Stakes	2	1,800 m (Firm)	12	3	2.2 (1)	1st	R1:44.4	0.0	Yuga Kawada	(Beach Samba)
Oct 13	Kyoto	Shuka Sho	1	2,000 m (Good)	17	1	3.5 (1)	8th	2:01.0	1.1	Yuga Kawada	Chrono Genesis
2020 – four-year-old season
Apr 11	Hanshin	Hanshin Himba Stakes	2	1,600 m (Firm)	16	13	2.9 (1)	5th	1:33.3	0.4	Yuga Kawada	Sound Chiara
May 17	Tokyo	Victoria Mile	1	1,600 m (Firm)	16	7	18.4 (6)	5th	1:31.5	0.9	Yuga Kawada	Almond Eye
Oct 17	Tokyo	Ireland Trophy	2	1,800 m (Soft)	8	2	4.0 (2)	6th	1:49.6	1.1	Yuga Kawada	Salacia
Dec 26	Hanshin	Hanshin Cup	2	1,400 m (Firm)	16	6	9.6 (4)	1st	1:19.7	–0.3	Yusuke Fujioka	(Maltese Diosa)
2021 – five-year-old season
Feb 28	Hanshin	Hankyu Hai	3	1,400 m (Firm)	17	2	3.1 (2)	5th	1:19.8	0.6	Yuga Kawada	Resistencia
Mar 28	Chukyo	Takamatsunomiya Kinen	1	1,200 m (Soft)	18	6	24.2 (8)	12th	1:10.0	0.8	Yusuke Fujioka	Danon Smash
May 16	Tokyo	Victoria Mile	1	1,600 m (Firm)	18	11	58.7 (9)	7th	1:31.9	0.9	Yusuke Fujioka	Gran Alegria
Oct 30	Hanshin	Swan Stakes	2	1,400 m (Firm)	18	9	3.7 (1)	1st	1:20.7	–0.1	Yuga Kawada	(Sound Chiara)
Dec 25	Hanshin	Hanshin Cup	2	1,400 m (Firm)	18	7	4.3 (2)	3rd	1:20.6	0.3	Yusuke Fujioka	Grenadier Guards

Legend:
Turf

- R indicated that it was a record time finish

== Pedigree ==
Pedigree of Danon Fantasy (JPN), bay filly 2016
Sire Deep Impact (JPN) 2002	Sunday Silence (USA); 1986	Halo	Hail to Reason
Sire Deep Impact (JPN) 2002	Sunday Silence (USA); 1986	Halo	Cosmah
Sire Deep Impact (JPN) 2002	Sunday Silence (USA); 1986	Wishing Well	Understanding
Sire Deep Impact (JPN) 2002	Sunday Silence (USA); 1986	Wishing Well	Mountain Flower
Sire Deep Impact (JPN) 2002	Wind in Her Hair (IRE); 1991	Alzao (USA)	Lyphard
Sire Deep Impact (JPN) 2002	Wind in Her Hair (IRE); 1991	Alzao (USA)	Lady Rebecca (GB)
Sire Deep Impact (JPN) 2002	Wind in Her Hair (IRE); 1991	Burghclere (GB)	Busted
Sire Deep Impact (JPN) 2002	Wind in Her Hair (IRE); 1991	Burghclere (GB)	Highclere
Dam Life For Sale (ARG) 2008	Not For Sale (ARG); 1994	Parade Marshal (USA)	Caro (IRE)
Dam Life For Sale (ARG) 2008	Not For Sale (ARG); 1994	Parade Marshal (USA)	Stepping High
Dam Life For Sale (ARG) 2008	Not For Sale (ARG); 1994	Love For Sale	Laramie Trail (USA)
Dam Life For Sale (ARG) 2008	Not For Sale (ARG); 1994	Love For Sale	Museliere
Dam Life For Sale (ARG) 2008	Doubt Fire (BRZ); 2001	Ski Champ (USA)	Icecapade
Dam Life For Sale (ARG) 2008	Doubt Fire (BRZ); 2001	Ski Champ (USA)	Ski Goggle
Dam Life For Sale (ARG) 2008	Doubt Fire (BRZ); 2001	My Little Life	Ghadeer (FR)
Dam Life For Sale (ARG) 2008	Doubt Fire (BRZ); 2001	My Little Life	Dimane (Family: 7-a)
