= Schnell Meister =

German-bred racehorse

Schnell Meister; シュネルマイスター
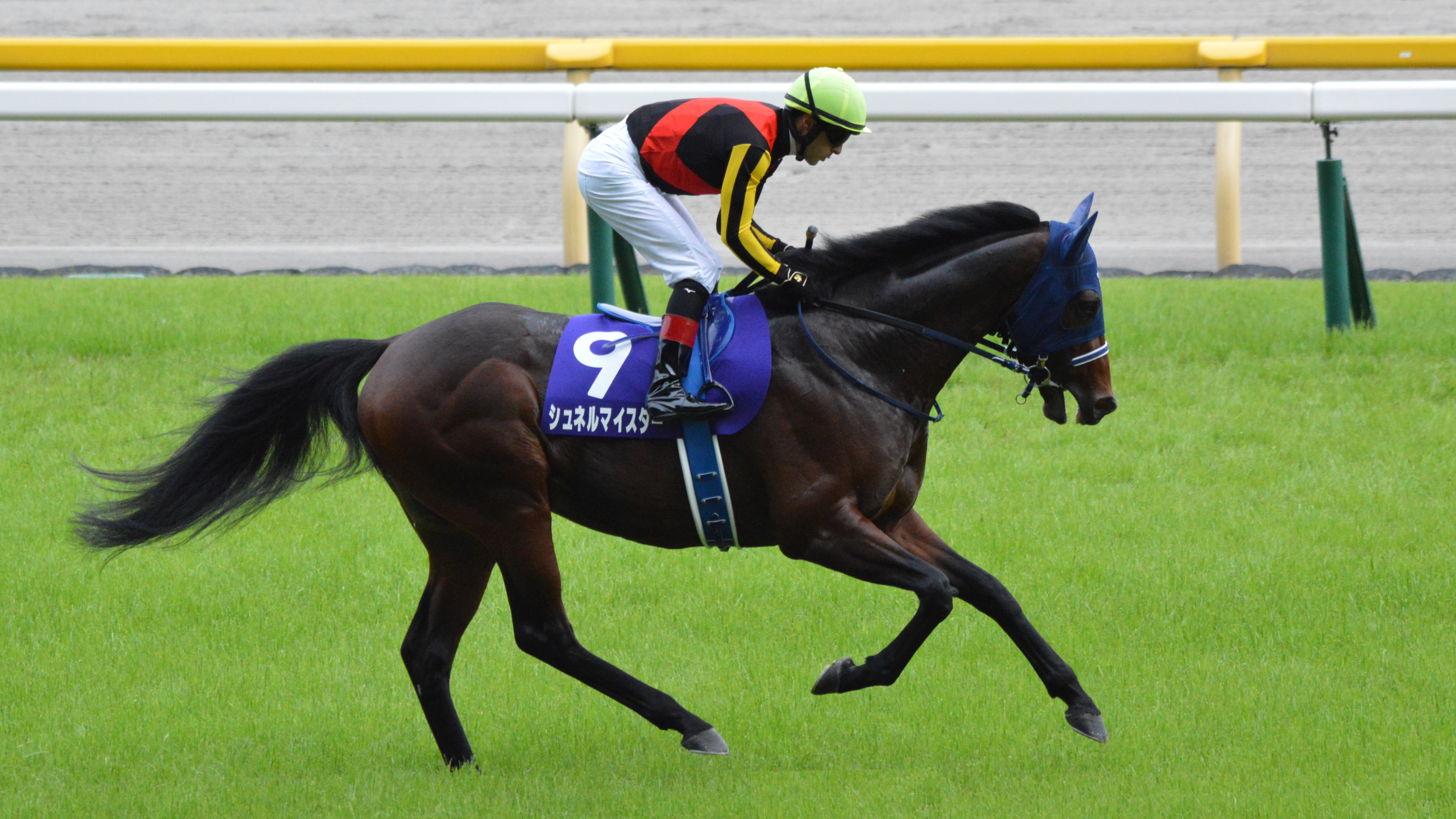
- Schnell Meister at the 2022 Yasuda Kinen
- Sire: Kingman
- Grandsire: Invincible Spirit
- Dam: Serienholde
- Damsire: Soldier Hollow
- Sex: Stallion
- Foaled: 23 March 2018
- Country: Germany
- Colour: Bay
- Breeder: Northern Farm
- Owner: Sunday Racing
- Racing colours
- Trainer: Takahisa Tezuka
- Jockey: Christophe Lemaire
- Record: 17: 5-3-3
- Earnings: 532,271,600 JPY; Japan : 526,520,000 JPY; UAE : 50,000 USD

Major wins
- Hiiragi Sho (2020); NHK Mile Cup (2021); Mainichi Okan (2021); Yomiuri Milers Cup (2023)
- Last updated on November 19, 2023

Schnell Meister (Japanese: シュネルマイスター, foaled 23 March 2018) is a German-bred Japanese-trained Thoroughbred retired racehorse. He showed promise as a two-year-old in 2020 when he won both of his races. In the following spring he finished second in the Yayoi Sho before winning the Grade 1 NHK Mile Cup.

== Background ==
Schnell Meister is a bay colt with a small white star bred in Germany by the Japanese breeding company Northern Farm. He entered the ownership of the Northern Farm associate Sunday Racing and was sent into training with Takahisa Tezuka.

He was from the third crop of foals sired by Kingman who was named Cartier Horse of the Year in 2014 when he won the Irish 2,000 Guineas, St James's Palace Stakes, Sussex Stakes and Prix Jacques Le Marois. Schnell Meister was the first foal of his dam Serienholde, a top class racemare who won the Preis der Diana as a three-year-old in 2016. She was a descendant of the German broodmare Suleika (foaled 1954) who was the ancestor of numerous major winners including Slip Anchor, Manhattan Cafe and Buena Vista.

== Racing career ==
=== 2020: two-year-old season ===
Schnell Meister made a successful racecourse debut at Sapporo Racecourse on 9 September when he won an event for previously unraced juveniles over 1500 metres on firm ground. Ridden by Takeshi Yokoyama he started the 1.1/1 favourite and took the lead in the straight before prevailing by three quarters of a length over Ten War Cry. After a break of three months the colt returned to the track in Nakayama Racecourse in December with Christophe Lemaire in the saddle and went off favourite for the 1600 metre Hiiragi Sho. He raced in mid-division before going to the front in the straight and came home three lengths clear of Wazamono with Arabian Night in third.

=== 2021: three-year-old season ===
For his three-year-old debut,, Schnell Meister was stepped up in class for the Grade 2 Yayoi Sho (a trial race for the Satsuki Sho) over 2000 metres at Nakayama on 7 March. With Lemaire in the saddle, and starting 3.9/1 second choice in the ten-runner field he raced in second place behind Titleholder, and although he was unable to challenge the front-running winner he held on to finish runner-up, a neck ahead of the favourite Danon The Kid. The fact that the colt had been unable to close on the winner in the closing stages of the race led Takahisa Tezuka to abandon plans to run him in the Satsuki Sho and bring him back in distance.

On 9 May Schnell Meister was partnered with Lemaire when he was one of eighteen three-year-olds to contest the 26th edition of the Grade 1 NHK Mile Cup over 1600 metres at Tokyo Racecourse. He went off the 2.7/1 second favourite behind Grenadier Guards in a field which also included Bathrat Leon (winner of the New Zealand Trophy), Ho O Amazon (Arlington Cup), Rooks Nest (Falcon Stakes), Pixie Knight (Shinzan Kinen) and Shock Action (Niigata Nisai Stakes). Schnell Meister settled in mid-division as Pixie Knight set the pace from Ho O Amazon and Grenadier Guards and turned into the straight in ninth place. In the closing stages he produced a sustained run on the outside and caught the filly Songline on the line to win by a nose. Grenadier Guards was two and a half lengths back in third to complete a 1-2-3 for Sunday Racing. Lemaire, who had just marked his 37th Grade 1 race win in Japan, commented; "He took some time to get into gear but eventually got into a good rhythm and responded strongly in the critical stages... There is still a lot of greenness in Schnell Meister and a lot of room for improvement but once he's established himself physically, he should be able to handle the best." Schnell Meister was then sent to the Yasuda Kinen, where he finished a close third behind Danon Kingly and Gran Alegria.

After a summer break, Schnell Meister was entered into the Mainichi Okan, where he beat Danon Kingly by a head, earning him his second grade race win. The horse was then sent to the Mile Championship but lost to Gran Alegria by 3/4 of a length.

=== 2022-23: four and five-year old seasons ===
Schnell Meister's first race for the 2022 season was the Dubai Turf, of which he was the most favored to win. Despite this, he finished 8th. The horse then went on to race in the Yasuda Kinen once again this time losing to Songline by a neck. After this race, however, he couldn't make an impressive showing for the remainder of the year. It was not until the Yomiuri Milers Cup of 2023 that Schnell Meister would be able to win any race. This win, which marked his 3rd graded race victory, allowed the horse to enter the Yasuda Kinen for a third year in row. However, he finished third to Songline in that race in spite of covering the last three furlongs the fastest.

After a summer break, he was entered in to the Mainichi Okan, where he came in third behind Elton Barows and Songline, and the following month he ran the Mile Championship, where he finished in 7th place. This would become his last race, as Sunday Racing announced several days after the race that both he and Songline would retire at the same time.

== Racing form ==
Schnell Meister won five races and placed in another six from 17 starts. The data below is based on JBIS, Netkeiba and HKJC. All races are on the turf track.

Date	Racecourse	Race	Grade	Distance (condition)	Entry	HN	Odds (Favored)	Finish	Time	Margins	Jockey	Winner (Runner-up)
2020 – two-year-old season
Sep 5	Sapporo	2yo Newcomer		1,500 m (Firm)	14	9	2.1 (1)	1st	1:30.5	–0.1	Takeshi Yokoyama	(Ten War Cry)
Dec 19	Nakayama	Hiiragi Sho	1W	1,600 m (Firm)	12	6	1.9 (1)	1st	1:35.8	–0.5	Christophe Lemaire	(Wazamono)
2021 – three-year-old season
Mar 7	Nakayama	Yayoi Sho	2	2,000 m (Firm)	10	10	4.9 (2)	2nd	2:02.2	0.2	Christophe Lemaire	Titleholder
May 9	Tokyo	NHK Mile Cup	1	1,600 m (Firm)	18	15	3.7 (2)	1st	1:31.6	0.1	Christophe Lemaire	(Songline)
Jun 6	Tokyo	Yasuda Kinen	1	1,600 m (Firm)	14	13	10.2 (4)	3rd	1:31.8	0.1	Takeshi Yokoyama	Danon Kingly
Oct 10	Tokyo	Mainichi Okan	2	1,800 m (Firm)	13	1	2.6 (1)	1st	1:44.8	0.0	Christophe Lemaire	(Danon Kingly)
Nov 21	Hanshin	Mile Championship	1	1,600 m (Firm)	16	3	4.6 (2)	2nd	1:32.7	0.1	Takeshi Yokoyama	Gran Alegria
2022 – four-year-old season
Mar 26	Meydan	Dubai Turf	1	2,000 m (Firm)	14	12	1.7 (1)	8th	1:46.7	1.0	Christophe Lemaire	Lord North; Panthalassa
Jun 5	Tokyo	Yasuda Kinen	1	1,600 m (Firm)	18	9	4.9 (2)	2nd	1:32.3	0.0	Christophe Lemaire	Songline
Oct 2	Nakayama	Sprinters Stakes	1	1,200 m (Firm)	16	15	8.5 (3)	9th	1:08.3	0.5	Takeshi Yokoyama	Gendarme
Nov 20	Hanshin	Mile Championship	1	1,600 m (Firm)	17	4	3.6 (1)	5th	1:32.8	0.3	Christophe Lemaire	Serifos
Dec 11	Sha Tin	Hong Kong Mile	1	1,600 m (Firm)	10	4	5.5 (3)	9th	1:35.7	2.3	Christophe Lemaire	California Spangle
2023 – five-year-old season
Feb 26	Nakayama	Nakayama Kinen	2	1,800 m (Firm)	14	5	9.2 (4)	4th	1:47.3	0.2	Theo Bachelot	Hishi Iguazu
Apr 23	Kyoto	Yomiuri Milers Cup	2	1,600 m (Firm)	15	10	2.5 (1)	1st	1:31.5	0.0	Christophe Lemaire	(Gaia Force)
Jun 4	Tokyo	Yasuda Kinen	1	1,600 m (Firm)	18	14	4.2 (1)	3rd	1:31.6	0.2	Christophe Lemaire	Songline
Oct 8	Tokyo	Mainichi Okan	1	1,800 m (Firm)	12	1	2.9 (2)	3rd	1:45.3	0.0	Christophe Lemaire	Elton Barows
Nov 19	Hanshin	Mile Championship	1	1,600 m (Firm)	16	9	2.5 (1)	7th	1:32.9	0.4	Christophe Lemaire	Namur

== Pedigree ==
Pedigree of Schnell Meister (GER), bay colt, 2018
Sire Kingman (GB) 2011	Invincible Spirit (IRE); 1997	Green Desert (USA)	Danzig
Sire Kingman (GB) 2011	Invincible Spirit (IRE); 1997	Green Desert (USA)	Foreign Courier
Sire Kingman (GB) 2011	Invincible Spirit (IRE); 1997	Rafha (GB)	Kris
Sire Kingman (GB) 2011	Invincible Spirit (IRE); 1997	Rafha (GB)	Eljazzi (IRE)
Sire Kingman (GB) 2011	Zenda (GB); 1999	Zamindar (USA)	Gone West
Sire Kingman (GB) 2011	Zenda (GB); 1999	Zamindar (USA)	Zaizafon
Sire Kingman (GB) 2011	Zenda (GB); 1999	Hope (IRE)	Dancing Brave (USA)
Sire Kingman (GB) 2011	Zenda (GB); 1999	Hope (IRE)	Bahamian
Dam Serienholde (GER) 2013	Soldier Hollow (GB); 2000	In The Wings	Sadler's Wells (USA)
Dam Serienholde (GER) 2013	Soldier Hollow (GB); 2000	In The Wings	High Hawk (IRE)
Dam Serienholde (GER) 2013	Soldier Hollow (GB); 2000	Island Race	Common Grounds (GB)
Dam Serienholde (GER) 2013	Soldier Hollow (GB); 2000	Island Race	Lake Isle (IRE)
Dam Serienholde (GER) 2013	Saldenehre (GER); 2000	Highest Honor (FR)	Kenmare
Dam Serienholde (GER) 2013	Saldenehre (GER); 2000	Highest Honor (FR)	High River
Dam Serienholde (GER) 2013	Saldenehre (GER); 2000	Salde	Alkalde
Dam Serienholde (GER) 2013	Saldenehre (GER); 2000	Salde	Saite (Family: 16-c)
