= Almond Eye =

Japanese-bred Thoroughbred racehorse

Almond Eye アーモンドアイ
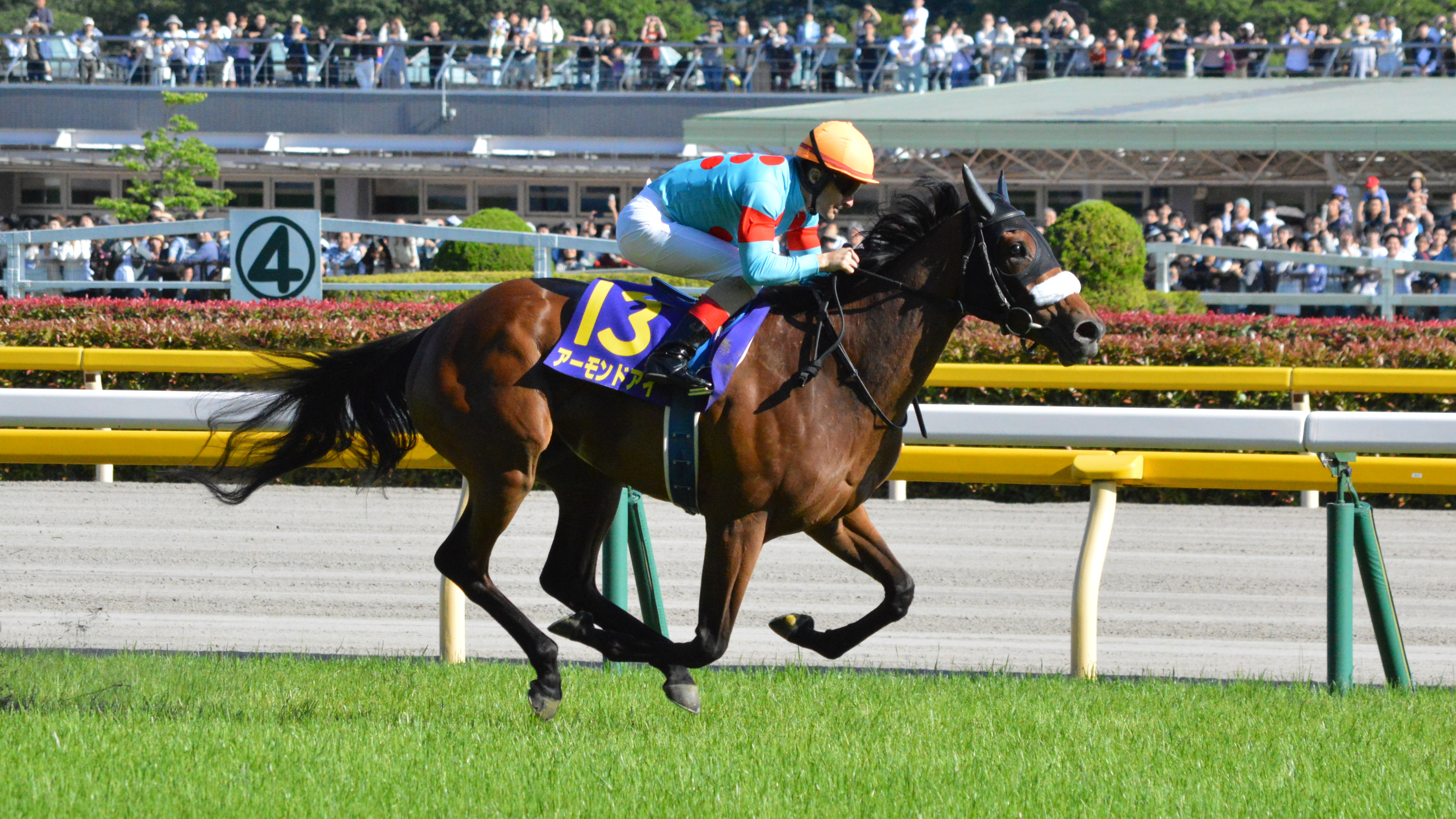
- Almond Eye wins the 2018 Yushun Himba.
- Breed: Thoroughbred
- Sire: Lord Kanaloa (JPN)
- Grandsire: King Kamehameha (JPN)
- Dam: Fusaichi Pandora (JPN)
- Damsire: Sunday Silence (USA)
- Sex: Mare
- Foaled: March 10, 2015 (age 11)
- Country: Japan
- Colour: Bay
- Breeder: Northern Farm
- Owner: Silk Racing Co. Ltd.
- Racing colours
- Trainer: Sakae Kunieda
- Jockey: Christophe Lemaire
- Record: 15: 11-2-1
- Earnings: ¥1,915,263,900; JPN: ¥1,519,563,000 JPY; UAE: US$3,600,000

Major wins
- Shinzan Kinen (2018); Japan Cup (2018, 2020); Dubai Turf (2019); Tenno Sho (Autumn) (2019, 2020); Victoria Mile (2020); Japanese Classic Tiara Race wins: Oka Sho (2018); Yushun Himba (2018); Shuka Sho (2018)

Awards
- 5th Japanese Triple Tiara Champion (2018); Japanese Horse of the Year (2018, 2020); JRA Award for Best Three-Year-Old Filly (2018); JRA Award for Best Older Filly or Mare (2020)

Honours
- Japan Racing Association Hall of Fame (2023); TRC Global Rankings World Champion (2020); Timeform rating: 129

Almond Eye (Japanese: アーモンドアイ, Hepburn: Aamondo Ai; foaled 10 March 2015) is a retired champion Japanese Thoroughbred racehorse and broodmare who became the fifth filly to win the Japanese Triple Tiara in 2018, and held the world record for the 2,400 meters on turf before it was broken by Calandagan in 2025. She is also a two-time winner of the Japan Cup, breaking the record in the 2018 race and defeating two other undefeated Japan Triple Crown winners in the 2020 race. Almond Eye was the 2018 and 2020 Japanese Horse of the Year, 2018 Best Three-Year-Old Filly, and 2020 Best Older Filly or Mare. She was the World Champion of 2020 in the TRC Global Horses Rankings, and is the highest earning racehorse in the world among the racehorses born in 2015. Her other notable wins include the Dubai Turf in 2019, the Tenno Sho in 2019 and 2020, and the Victoria Mile in 2020.

== Background ==
Almond Eye is a bay mare bred in Japan by Northern Farm and owned by Silk Racing. She was sent into training with Sakae Kunieda. Almond Eye usually raced in a black hood and a white shadow roll.

Almond Eye is from the first crop of foals sired by Lord Kanaloa, an outstanding sprinter-miler who was the 2013 Japanese Horse of the Year. Her dam Fusaichi Pandora was a top-class racemare who won the 2006 Queen Elizabeth II Cup. She was a descendant of the influential American broodmare Best In Show, the ancestor of numerous major winners including El Gran Senor, Try My Best, Xaar, Jazil, Rags to Riches and Redoute's Choice.

== Racing career ==
=== 2017: two-year-old season ===
Almond Eye made her debut in a newcomers' race over 1400 metres at Niigata Racecourse on August 6 and finished second to Nishino Urara.

Two months later at Tokyo Racecourse, she recorded her first success in a 1600 metres maiden race, winning by three lengths from Cosmo Feerique.

=== 2018: three-year-old season ===
==== Spring and summer ====
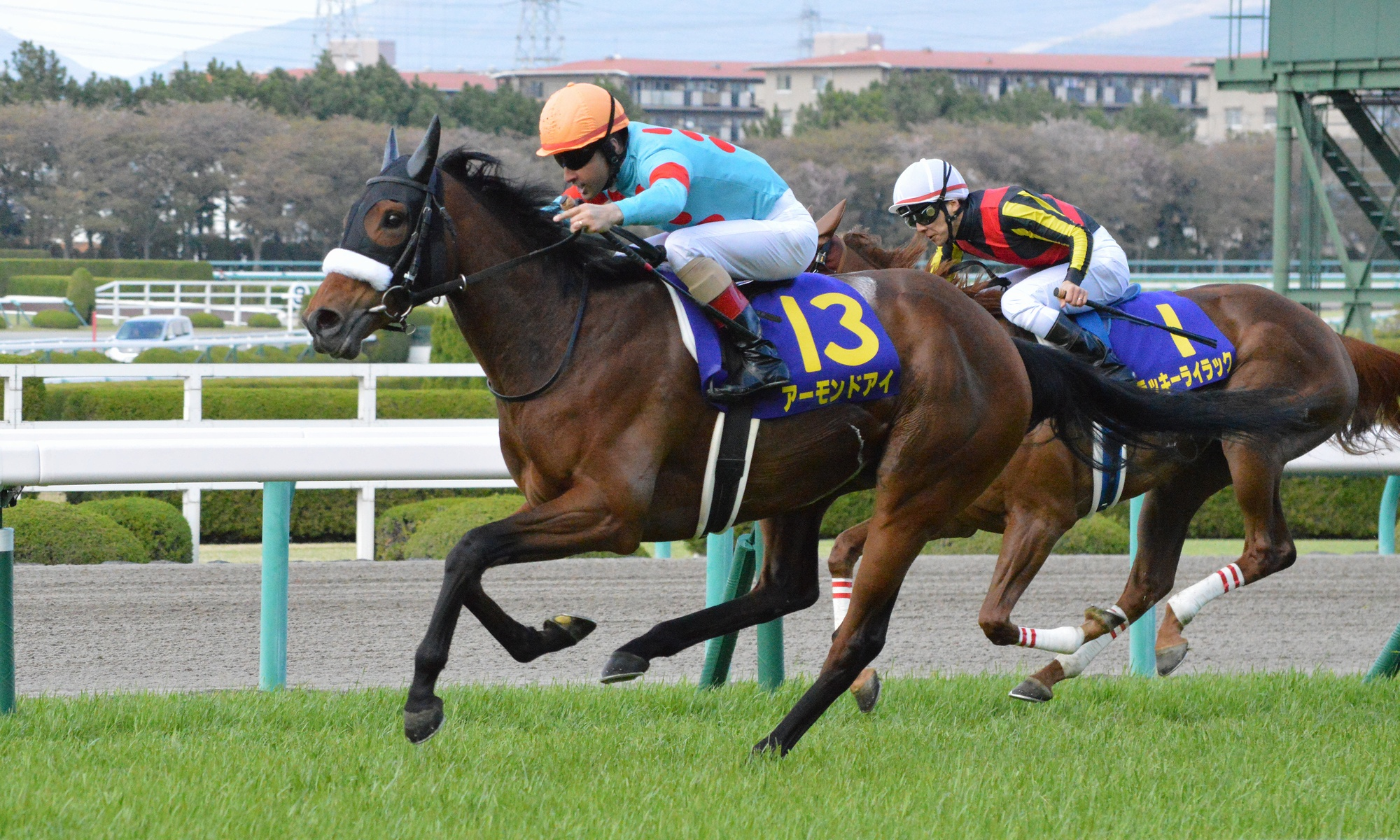
Almond Eye wins the Oka Sho

On 8 January Almond Eye was ridden by Keita Tosaki when she started the 1.9/1 favourite for the Grade 3 Shinzan Kinen over 1600 metres at Kyoto Racecourse and won by one and three quarter lengths from Tsuzumimon. Christophe Lemaire took the ride when Almond Eye returned to the track for the Grade 1 Oka Sho over 1600 metres at Hanshin Racecourse on 8 April. She started the 2.9/1 second favourite behind the Hanshin Juvenile Fillies winner Lucky Lilac with the best fancied of the other fifteen runners being Lily Noble, Mau Lea and Finift. After racing towards the rear of the field, the filly produced a strong late run in the straight, took the lead in the last 100 metres and won by one and three quarter length from Lucky Lilac in a race record time of 1:33.1. Lemaire commented "Her response and speed at the stretch was unbelievable and felt great! Her strides kept getting bigger and all I had to do was to keep her straight. A step up in distance shouldn’t be a problem for this talented filly who has great potentials to win the Triple Crown".

On 20 May Almond Eye was stepped up in distance to contest the Yushun Himba over 2400 metres at Tokyo and started the 0.7/1 favourite ahead of Lucky Lilac, Lily Noble and Satono Walkure (Flora Stakes). Lemaire positioned the filly in mid division as the outsider Sayakachan set the pace, but then moved into contention entering the straight. Almond Eye produced a sustained run on the outside, took the lead approaching the last 200 metres and won by two lengths from Lily Noble. After the race Lemaire said "I had every confidence in her and race went perfectly for us. She was a little hyped up but we had a good start and in a good position. From there she settled in well and her turn of foot in the home straight was terrific. The stretch in distance was absolutely no problem for her. She is one special filly with great potential and fit to face international competition if she has the chance".

==== Autumn ====
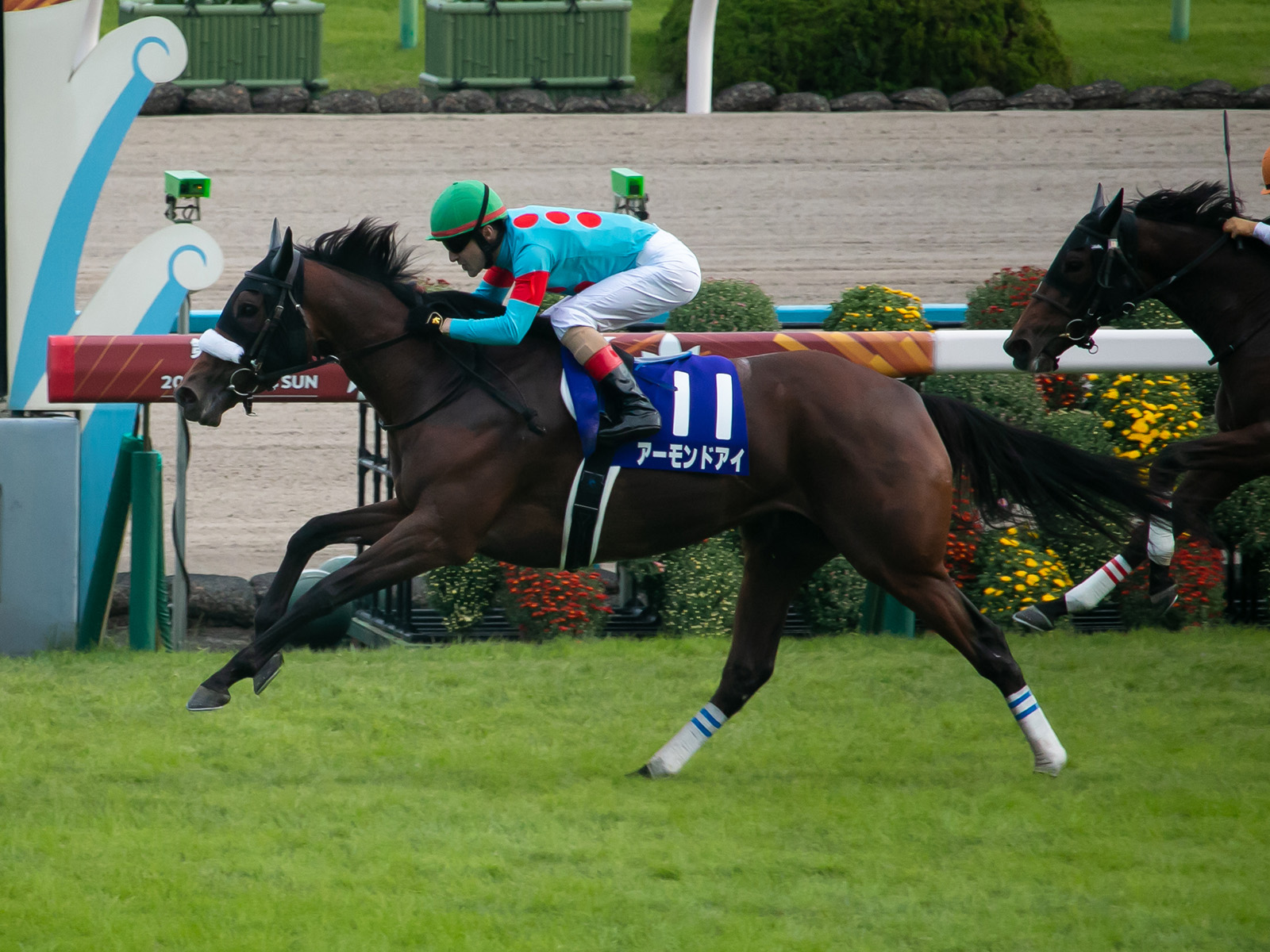
Almond Eye wins the Shuka Sho

After an absence of well over four months, Almond Eye returned for the Shuka Sho over 2000 metres at Kyoto as she attempted to become the fifth horse to complete the Japanese Triple Crown for fillies. Before the race Kunieda explained "She has improved a lot and she’s tracking very well. Her hind hooves are hitting her front hooves a bit but much less than they were. She went all out in the Oaks and she was a bit tired after that. Over the summer, she matured physically and mentally and has returned to work looking good. She gained more than 10kg over the summer but you can see that she has added muscle". She was made the 0.3/1 favourite ahead of her old rival Lucky Lilac (6.3/1) with the only others in the seventeen-runner field to start at less than 20/1 being Cantabile (Rose Stakes) and Mikki Charm. Lemaire positioned the favourite towards the rear as Mikki Charm set the pace, but then switched to the wide outside exiting the final turn. Almond Eye produced her customary late charge, caught Mikki Charm in the final strides and won by one and a half length. Lemaire commented "I was a bit worried today because Almond Eye was rather nervous and highly strung than usual, so the start wasn’t that good, then our path was blocked and we had to go wide, but from there she just showed just how exceptional she was. She’s such a fantastic filly".

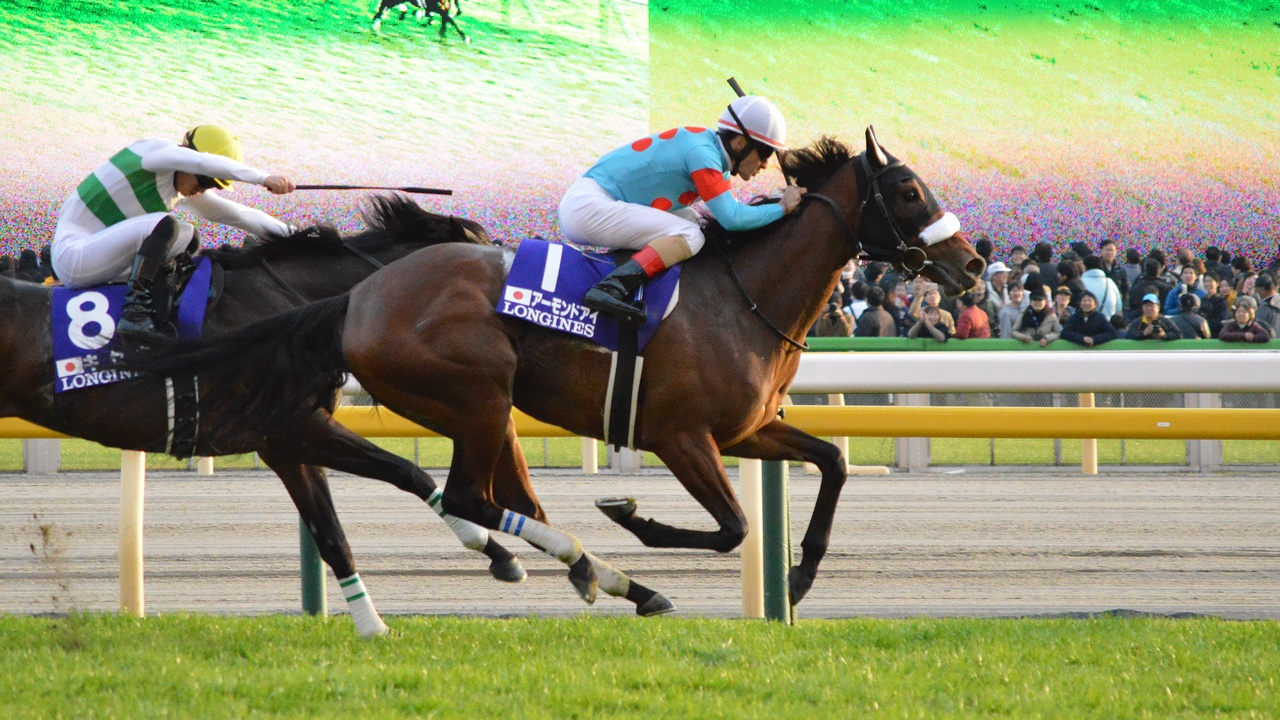
Almond Eye wins the Japan Cup

On 25 November the filly was matched against male opposition to contest the 38th running of the Japan Cup over 2400 metres at Tokyo in which she was partnered Lemaire and started as the odds-on favourite. In the build-up to the race Kunieda said "She did seem a bit lightheaded after the Shuka Sho and she ran a temperature for a bit but quickly recovered. She looks leaner than she did before her last race, but she’s relaxed and her responses are good". Her thirteen opponents included Cheval Grand (winner of the race in 2017), Satono Diamond, Satono Crown, Capri, Suave Richard and Kiseki (Kikuka Sho). After tracking the front-runners the filly turned into the straight in second place behind Kiseki, who had set a very strong pace. She moved up alongside Kiseki 200 metres from the finish and drew away in the closing stages to win by one and three quarter lengths with a gap of three and a half lengths back to Suave Richard in third. The winning time of 2:20.6 broke the existing race record by 1.5 seconds, a record that stood until the 2025 Japan Cup when Irish bred French trained Calandagan ran a 2:20.3. Lemaire commented "Today I was a little bit anxious, but I think we saw the best Almond Eye in the race and it was a great show... This is a very special filly as I keep telling the press in Japan that she is “Perfect” –her ability, temperament, she can adapt and race from any position".

In January 2019, Almond Eye was unanimously voted Japanese Horse of the Year and Best Three-Year-Old Filly at the JRA Awards for 2018. In the 2018 World's Best Racehorse Rankings Almond Eye was rated the best three-year-old filly in the world (level with Alpha Centauri) and the eleventh best horse of any age or sex.

=== 2019: four-year-old season ===
For her first race as a four-year-old, Almond Eye was sent to the United Arab Emirates to contest the Dubai Turf over 1800 metres at Meydan Racecourse on 30 March. With Lemaire in the saddle she started the 6/5 favourite in a thirteen-runner field which included Dream Castle (Jebel Hatta), Vivlos, Without Parole and Deirdre. After racing in mid-division, Almond Eye made rapid progress in the straight, took the lead 200 metres from the finish and won by one and a quarter lengths from Vivlos, with the British gelding Lord Glitters half a length away in third. Lemaire commented "Down the stretch when I pulled her out, she used her powerful stride as usual. She was very relaxed but the thing was, we took the lead a little bit soon and so I think she relaxed a little bit in the last few yards... We did a good job today, it was beautiful, I think everyone enjoyed seeing such a good horse on the track". The filly was then brought back in distance for the 1600 metre Yasuda Kinen over 1600 metres on 2 June and was made the 7/10 favourite. After failing to obtain a good racing position from a wide draw Almond Eye was repeatedly denied a clear run until the last 300 metres and despite launching a powerful late run she failed by a head and a nose to catch Indy Champ and Aerolithe.

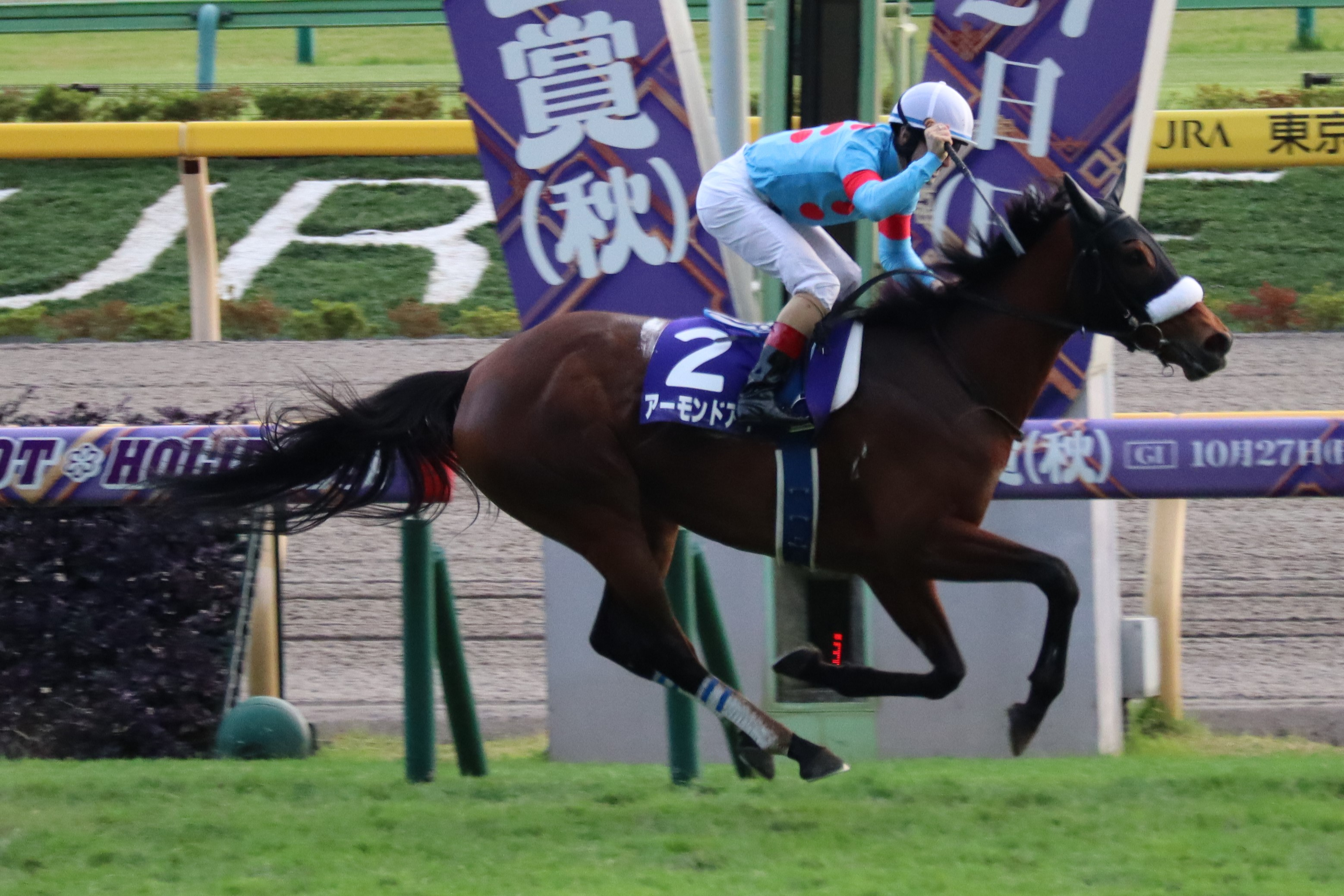
Almond Eye wins the Tenno Sho

Almond Eye had been expected to travel to France for the Prix de l'Arc de Triomphe, but the plan was cancelled. Almond Eye was suffering hyperthermia after Shuka Sho, Japan Cup and Dubai Turf. The filly returned on 27 October when she contested the autumn edition of the Tenno Sho over 2000 metres at Tokyo and went off the 6/10 favourite against fifteen opponents including Danon Premium, Saturnalia, Al Ain, Wagnerian, Aerolithe, Win Bright, Suave Richard and Makahiki. After settling in sixth place Almond Eye accelerated up the inside rail in the straight, took the lead approaching the last 200 metres and drew away to win by three lengths from Danon Premium. Lemaire said "She was well rested after a long break and showed her true strength today. We were able to follow Aerolithe and Saturnalia in a good position, found a good opening on the rails and she just stretched beautifully from there."

On her final run of the year Almond Eye started odds on favourite for the Arima Kinen over 2500 metres at Nakayama on 22 December. She raced towards the outside for most of the way and moved up to dispute the lead early in the straight but was soon under pressure and dropped out of contention to finish ninth behind Lys Gracieux. After the race Lemaire said "She was physically fit and in good condition but she couldn’t keep her calm before the crowd in the first lap and lost her rhythm. She was unable to relax and was tired".

=== 2020: five-year-old season ===
Almond Eye was sent to Dubai in early 2020 to attempt to repeat her success of the previous year in the Dubai Turf but returned to Japan when the meeting was cancelled owing to the COVID-19 pandemic. The mare made a belated seasonal debut in the Group 1 Victoria Mile over 1600 metres at Tokyo on 17 May and started the 0.4/1 favourite in a sixteen-runner field which also included Loves Only You, Normcore and Danon Fantasy. After tracking the leaders in fourth place, she took the lead 200 metres from the finish and drew away in the closing stages to win by four lengths from Sound Chiara. Lemaire commented "I think she's matured well, as she was relaxed from the paddock to the start of the race. I was able to position her in good position behind Sound Chiara and race her in her own rhythm without getting any pressure from the outside. She felt good during the race and displayed her powerful strides at the end. She's a legend horse."

On 7 June at Tokyo Almond Eye started the 0.3/1 favourite as she made her second attempt to win the Yasuda Kinen. She started slowly before making up ground rapidly in the straight but never looked likely to threaten the winner Gran Alegria and was beaten two and a half lengths into second place. After the race Lemaire said "We had a poor break but I think we recovered well and made a smooth and strong bid turning for home with Gran Alegria in aim. She showed her good turn of foot but she could have done better. The winner was just so strong, it wasn’t our day."

After the summer break Almond Eye returned to the track for the autumn edition of the Tenno Sho at Tokyo on 1 November and started the 0.4/1 favourite ahead of Chrono Genesis in a twelve-runner field which also included Fierement, Win Bright, Blast Onepiece, Danon Premium, Kiseki and the Nakayama Kinen winner Danon Kingly. Almond Eye settled in fourth place as Danon Premium set the pace from Daiwa Cagney and Kiseki. She moved into second place in the straight, overhauled Danon Premium inside the last 200 meters and held off the late challenges of Fierement and Chrono Genesis to win by half a length and a neck. Her victory made her the first horse to win eight Grade 1 races in Japan. A "slightly teary" Lemaire commented: "Today, the mare was relaxed before the start and we were able to break well. She showed a great turn of foot in the straight but ran out of steam a bit climbing the hill. The others were gaining on us but she didn't give up. I have to admit, to win the eighth Grade 1 title was a big pressure, but she didn't let us down—her performance was awesome."

Four weeks after her win in the Tenno Sho, Almond Eye ended her track career with an attempt to win a second Japan Cup in a race which saw her matched against the outstanding undefeated three-year-olds Contrail and Daring Tact, respectively winners of the Japanese Triple Crown and the Japanese Fillies Triple Crown. The other twelve contenders included Glory Vase, Curren Bouquetd'or (runner-up in the race in 2019), Kiseki, World Premiere, Makahiki and the French challenger Way To Paris (winner of the Grand Prix de Saint-Cloud). Starting the 1.2/1 favourite Almond Eye settled in third place as Kiseki set the pace and built up a huge lead which he maintained into the straight. The mare launched a strong run down the centre of the track, overtook Kiseki approaching the last 100 metres and kept on well to win by one and a quarter lengths from Contrail with Daring Tact, Curren Bouquetd'or and Glory Vase close behind in third, fourth and fifth. After the race Kunieda said "We were worried about the rough going near the rails, but Christophe did a good job in finding a good path... all we wanted was for her to come back safe and sound. The victory is such a bonus, we couldn’t be happier. She has given us so much excitement and joy and it has been fulfilling to be a part of her career" while Lemaire commented "Since this was her final start, it was very special for me and I'm thrilled we were able to win... She was relaxed in the gate, broke smoothly and was able to sit in a good position... The pace was just right for her and she responded well in the stretch. The others closing in on us didn't worry me at all. Almond Eye is a perfect mare and doesn’t have any weak points."

On December 19, Almond Eye was honoured in a retirement ceremony at Nakayama Racecourse in which she paraded in front of 2,500 fans who had been awarded tickets in a lottery. In address to the crowd Lemaire said "Today, we are here to celebrate the retirement of the fantastic mare who rewrote the history of Japanese horse racing. Almond Eye has been special from the beginning. With her shape, running form, fighting spirit, and unusual ability, her fame has attracted horse racing fans all over the world, not just in Japan." Kunieda addressed the mare directly saying "Almond Eye, good work. Thank you for making such a great achievement and leaving a pleasant memory. After you will go back to the farm and have a child, I want to train him or her in my yard, so please give birth to good children."

In January 2021, Almond Eye was voted Japanese Horse of the Year and Best Older Filly or Mare at the JRA Awards for 2020. Almond Eye is the World Champion of 2020 in the TRC Global Horses Rankings.

In June 2023, Almond Eye was inducted in to the JRA Hall of Fame on her second year of eligibility. This was after failing to be inducted the year prior, which sparked controversy among fans and horse racing journalists over the selection process of the Hall of Fame.

== Racing statistics ==
Almond Eye won 11 races out of 15 starts. This data is available in JBIS, netkeiba and Racing Post.

Date	Course	Race	Grade	Distance (Condition)	Field	HN	Odds (Favored)	Finish	Time	Winning (Losing) Margin	Jockey	Winner (Runner-up)	Ref
2017 – two-year-old season
Aug 6	Niigata	Two Year Old Debut		Turf 1,400 m (Firm)	17	12	1.3 (1st)	2nd	1:24.0	(2 lengths)	Christophe Lemaire	Nishino Urara	
Oct 8	Tokyo	Two Year Old		Turf 1,600 m (Firm)	15	11	1.2 (1st)	1st	1:35.1	3 1/2 lengths	Christophe Lemaire	(Cosmo Feerique)	
2018 – three-year-old season
Jan 8	Kyoto	Shinzan Kinen	GIII	Turf 1,600 m (Good)	11	3	2.9 (1st)	1st	1:37.1	1 3/4 lengths	Keita Tosaki	(Tsuzumimon)	
Apr 8	Hanshin	Oka Sho	GI	Turf 1,600 m (Firm)	17	13	3.9 (2nd)	1st	1:33.1	1 3/4 lengths	Christophe Lemaire	(Lucky Lilac)	
May 20	Tokyo	Yushun Himba	GI	Turf 2,400 m (Firm)	17	13	1.7 (1st)	1st	2:23.8	2 lengths	Christophe Lemaire	(Lily Noble)	
Oct 14	Kyoto	Shuka Sho	GI	Turf 2,000 m (Firm)	17	11	1.3 (1st)	1st	1:58.5	1 1/2 lengths	Christophe Lemaire	(Mikki Charm)	
Nov 25	Tokyo	Japan Cup	GI	Turf 2,400 m (Firm)	14	1	1.4 (1st)	1st	R2:20.6	1 3/4 lengths	Christophe Lemaire	(Kiseki)	
2019 – four-year-old season
Mar 30	Meydan	Dubai Turf	GI	Turf 1,800 m (Firm)	13	7	1.2 (1st)	1st	1:47.0	1 1/4 lengths	Christophe Lemaire	(Vivlos)	
Jun 2	Tokyo	Yasuda Kinen	GI	Turf 1,600 m (Firm)	16	14	1.7 (1st)	3rd	1:30.9	(1/4 length)	Christophe Lemaire	Indy Champ	
Oct 27	Tokyo	Tenno Sho (Autumn)	GI	Turf 2,000 m (Firm)	16	2	1.6 (1st)	1st	1:56.2	3 lengths	Christophe Lemaire	(Danon Premium)	
Dec 22	Nakayama	Arima Kinen	GI	Turf 2,500 m (Firm)	16	9	1.5 (1st)	9th	2:32.3	(11 1/4 lenghs)	Christophe Lemaire	Lys Gracieux	
2020 – five-year-old season
May 17	Tokyo	Victoria Mile	GI	Turf 1,600 m (Firm)	16	12	1.4 (1st)	1st	1:30.6	4 lengths	Christophe Lemaire	(Sound Chiara)	
Jun 7	Tokyo	Yasuda Kinen	GI	Turf 1,600 m (Good)	14	5	1.3 (1st)	2nd	1:32.0	(2 1/2 lengths)	Christophe Lemaire	Gran Alegria	
Nov 1	Tokyo	Tenno Sho (Autumn)	GI	Turf 2,000 m (Firm)	12	9	1.4 (1st)	1st	1:57.8	1/2 length	Christophe Lemaire	(Fierement)	
Nov 29	Tokyo	Japan Cup	GI	Turf 2,400 m (Firm)	15	2	2.2 (1st)	1st	2:23.0	1 1/4 lengths	Christophe Lemaire	(Contrail)	

- R in the chart and the time written in red indicates the horse finished in record time.

== Breeding career ==
c = colt, f = filly

No.	Name	Foaled	Sex	Color	Sire	Wins	Races	Remarks
1st	Aaron's Rod	2022	c	Bay	Epiphaneia	2	11	Active
2nd	Promesa al Mundo	2023	c	Chestnut	Maurice	1	1	Active
3rd	Les Yeux Noirs	2024	f	Bay	Kitasan Black			Pre-debut
4th	(Almond Eye 2025)	2025	c	Bay	Equinox			
5th	(Almond Eye 2026)	2026	c	Bay	Equinox			

== In popular culture ==
An anthropomorphized version of Almond Eye appears as a character in the Japanese multimedia franchise Umamusume: Pretty Derby, voiced by Kaori Ishihara. She is depicted as a fiercely competitive girl who takes losing very poorly, reflected in her career mode with the requirements to get first-place wins in all of her goal races. Her hyper-competitive behavior also causes her to overreact and respond poorly to unfavorable situations, ranging from picking fights with a baby to immediately rushing to train upon hearing that her speed record was broken, the former referencing a photo of the real-life Almond Eye seemingly racing against her own colt and him struggling to keep up with her, and the latter referencing Calandagan breaking her real-world counterpart's record at the 2025 Japan Cup.

Due to her 9 Group 1 race wins, she is affectionately known as “cucumber” by Japanese racing fans on social media. This is a pun resulting from her 9 (九, pronounced “kyuu”) G1 wins, G1 wins being known as “crowns” (冠, pronounced “kan”), and her being a horse (馬, pronounced “baa”).

== Pedigree ==
Pedigree of Almond Eye (JPN), bay mare, 2015
Sire Lord Kanaloa (JPN) 2008	King Kamehameha (JPN); 2001	Kingmambo (USA)	Mr Prospector (USA)
Sire Lord Kanaloa (JPN) 2008	King Kamehameha (JPN); 2001	Kingmambo (USA)	Miesque (USA)
Sire Lord Kanaloa (JPN) 2008	King Kamehameha (JPN); 2001	Manfath (IRE)	Last Tycoon (IRE)
Sire Lord Kanaloa (JPN) 2008	King Kamehameha (JPN); 2001	Manfath (IRE)	Pilot Bird (GB)
Sire Lord Kanaloa (JPN) 2008	Lady Blossom (JPN); 1996	Storm Cat (USA)	Storm Bird (CAN)
Sire Lord Kanaloa (JPN) 2008	Lady Blossom (JPN); 1996	Storm Cat (USA)	Terlingua (USA)
Sire Lord Kanaloa (JPN) 2008	Lady Blossom (JPN); 1996	Saratoga Dew (USA)	Cormorant (USA)
Sire Lord Kanaloa (JPN) 2008	Lady Blossom (JPN); 1996	Saratoga Dew (USA)	Super Luna (USA)
Dam Fusaichi Pandora (JPN) 2003	Sunday Silence (USA); 1986	Halo (USA)	Hail To Reason (USA)
Dam Fusaichi Pandora (JPN) 2003	Sunday Silence (USA); 1986	Halo (USA)	Cosmah (USA)
Dam Fusaichi Pandora (JPN) 2003	Sunday Silence (USA); 1986	Wishing Well (USA)	Understanding (USA)
Dam Fusaichi Pandora (JPN) 2003	Sunday Silence (USA); 1986	Wishing Well (USA)	Mountain Flower (USA)
Dam Fusaichi Pandora (JPN) 2003	Lotta Lace (USA); 1992	Nureyev (USA)	Northern Dancer (CAN)
Dam Fusaichi Pandora (JPN) 2003	Lotta Lace (USA); 1992	Nureyev (USA)	Special (USA)
Dam Fusaichi Pandora (JPN) 2003	Lotta Lace (USA); 1992	Sex Appeal (USA)	Buckpasser (USA)
Dam Fusaichi Pandora (JPN) 2003	Lotta Lace (USA); 1992	Sex Appeal (USA)	Best in Show (Family: 8-f)

== See also ==
- List of leading Thoroughbred racehorses
