= Grenadier Guards (horse) =

Japanese Thoroughbred racehorse

Grenadier Guards; グレナディアガーズ
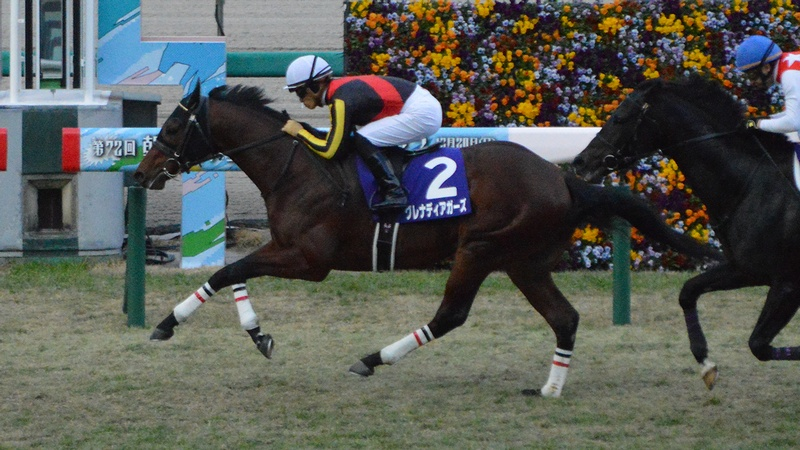
- Grenadier Guards at the Asahi Hai Futurity Stakes
- Sire: Frankel
- Grandsire: Galileo
- Dam: Wavell Avenue
- Damsire: Harlington
- Sex: Stallion
- Foaled: 4 February 2018
- Country: Japan
- Colour: Bay
- Breeder: Northern Farm
- Owner: Sunday Racing
- Racing colours
- Trainer: Mitsumasa Nakauchida
- Jockey: Yuga Kawada; Cristian Demuro
- Record: 16: 3-4-2
- Earnings: 271,396,000 JPY

Major wins
- Asahi Hai Futurity Stakes (2020); Hanshin Cup (2021)
- Last updated on June 23, 2025

Grenadier Guards (Japanese: グレナディアガーズ foaled 4 February 2018) is a retired Japanese Thoroughbred racehorse and breeding stallion. He was one of the best two-year-olds in Japan in 2020 when he won two of his four races including the Asahi Hai Futurity Stakes.

== Background ==
Grenadier Guards is a bay stallion bred in Japan by Northern Farm. He was sent into training with Mitsumasa Nakauchida and carries the black, red and yellow colours of Sunday Racing.

He was from the fifth crop of foals sired by Frankel, an undefeated British racehorse whose other progeny have included Cracksman, Anapurna, Soul Stirring and Without Parole. Grenadier Guards is the first foal of his dam Wavell Avenue, an Ontario-bred sprinter who won the Breeders' Cup Filly & Mare Sprint as a four-year-old in 2015. She was a female-line descendant of the Kentucky-bred broodmare Milonga (foaled in 1961), making her a distant relative of Go And Go, Media Puzzle and Refuse To Bend.

== Racing career ==
=== 2020: two-year-old season ===
Grenadier Guards was ridden in all of his starts as a two-year-old by Yuga Kawada. The colt began his racing career on July 26 when he finished second to the filly Salvia in a newcomers' race over 1400 metres at Niigata Racecourse, beaten half a length by the winner. In September he started the 1.6/1 second favourite for a maiden race over 1600 metres at Chukyo Racecourse but came home fourth of the ten runners behind Red Belle Aube. The colt's assistant trainer Yuya Katayama later said that the colt "didn't quite find a good enough rhythm" in the race. Grenadier Guards started favourite for a seventeen-runner maiden over 1400 metres at Hanshin Racecourse on November 7 and recorded his first success as he took the lead in the straight and drew away to win by three lengths from the front-running outsider Lord Respect.

Despite his modest form, Grenadier Guards was stepped up to Grade 1 level on 20 December at Hanshin to contest the Asahi Hai Futurity Stakes over 1600 metres and went off a 16.5/1 outsider. Red Belle Aube, who had gone on from his maiden win to take the Daily Hai Nisai Stakes started favourite while the other fourteen runners included Shock Action (Niigata Nisai Stakes), Mondreise (Keio Hai Nisai Stakes) and Stella Veloce (Saudi Arabia Royal Cup). Racing in blinkers, Grenadier Guards started well and settled in second place behind Mondreise, who opened up a big lead before fading in the straight. Grenadier Guards went to the front 200 metres from the finish and held off the late challenge of Stella Veloce to win by three quarters of a length. The winning time of 1:32.3 was a new track record. After the race, Yuga Kawada said: "my concern was to keep him happy and in good rhythm because the colt has a difficult temper and can run off like he did in his second career outing so you have to be careful to keep him controlled, but he has great potentials if he can bring out his best and I am looking forward for another good season for him next year".

In the official Japanese rankings Grenadier Guards was rated the second best two-year-old colt of 2020, one pound behind Danon The Kid.

=== 2021: three-year-old season ===
On his first appearance as a three-year-old, Grenadier Guards started favourite for the Grade 3 Falcon Stakes over 1400 metres at Chukyo on March 20 but was beaten a head into second place by Rook's Nest. On May 9, Grenadier Guards contested the 26th edition of the Grade 1 NHK Mile Cup over 1600 metres at Tokyo Racecourse and started the 2.4/1 favourite. After settling in sixth place he was switched to the outside and made progress in the straight but was outpaced in the closing stages and came home third behind Schnell Meister and Songline.

Following a summer break, Grenadier Guards returned to the track for the Grade 3 Keisei Hai Autumn Handicap over 1600 metres at Nakayama Racecourse on September 12 when he was matched against older horses for the first time. He started favourite again but finished third behind the five-year-olds Catedral and Contra Check. He was moved back up to Grade 1 class for the Mile Championship ay Hanshin on November 12 when he ran unplaced behind Gran Alegria. Grenadier Guards then went on to race in the Hanshin Cup on 25 December with jockey Cristian Demuro in which they won the race.

=== 2022 and 2023: four and five-year-old seasons ===
Grenadier Guards' first race of 2022 was the Takamatsunomiya Kinen, but finished at an unimpressive 12th place due to his place position being the most outward. The horse was then sent abroad to the United Kingdom where he finished at 19th place in the Queen Elizabeth II Jubilee Stakes. The horse was entered in the Hanshin Cup after a six months break in an attempt to win the same race once again but finished second behind Diatonic.

Grenadier Guards was entered in the Hankyu Hai and the Takamatsunomiya Kinen but did not place in either race. After finishing the Takamatsunomiya Kinen, it was announced that the horse had suffered a broken carpal bone, and forced out of the race for at least six months.

Grenadier Guards returned to racing on October 28 at the Swan Stakes but finished sixth behind Win Greatest. On his next and final race, the Hanshin Cup, the horse finished second behind Win Marvel. Following this race, the horse was retired from racing and sent to the Shadai Stallion Station to stand stud there.

== Racing form ==
Grenadier Guards won three races in 16 starts. This data is available in JBIS, netkeiba and racingpost.

Date	Track	Race	Grade	Distance (Condition)	Entry	HN	Odds (Favored)	Finish	Time	Margins	Jockey	Winner (Runner-up)
2020 – two-year-old season
Jul 6	Niigata	2yo Newcomer		1,400 m (Firm)	15	10	1.5 (1)	2nd	1:22.4	0.1	Yuga Kawada	Salvia
Sep 19	Chukyo	2yo Maiden		1,600 m (Firm)	10	7	2.6 (2)	4th	1:34.3	1.2	Yuga Kawada	Red Belle Aube
Nov 7	Hanshin	2yo Maiden		1,400 m (Firm)	17	8	1.7 (1)	1st	1:20.4	–0.5	Yuga Kawada	(Lord Respect)
Dec 20	Hanshin	Asahi Hai Futurity Stakes	1	1,600 m (Firm)	16	2	17.5 (7)	1st	R1:32.3	–0.1	Yuga Kawada	(Stella Veloce)
2021 – three-year-old season
Mar 20	Chukyo	Falcon Stakes	3	1,400 m (Firm)	15	4	1.8 (1)	2nd	1:20.1	0.0	Yuga Kawada	Rooks Nest
May 9	Tokyo	NHK Mile Cup	1	1,600 m (Firm)	18	8	3.8 (1)	3rd	1:32.1	0.5	Yuga Kawada	Schnell Meister
Sep 12	Nakayama	Keisei Hai Autumn Handicap	3	1,600 m (Firm)	16	1	2.8 (1)	3rd	1:32.1	0.1	Yuga Kawada	Catedral
Nov 21	Hanshin	Mile Championship	1	1,600 m (Firm)	16	9	10.1 (4)	13th	1:33.8	1.2	Kenichi Ikezoe	Gran Alegria
Dec 25	Hanshin	Hanshin Cup	2	1,400 m (Firm)	18	12	5.0 (3)	1st	1:20.3	–0.3	Cristian Demuro	(Ho O Amazon)
2022 – four-year-old season
Mar 27	Chukyo	Takamatsunomiya Kinen	1	1,200 m (Soft)	18	18	5.6 (3)	12th	1:08.8	0.5	Yuichi Fukunaga	Naran Huleg
Jun 18	Ascot	Platinum Jubilee Stakes	1	6 f (Firm)	24	10	50/1 (19)	19th	1:13.7	1.6	Cristian Demuro	Naval Crown
Dec 24	Hanshin	Hanshin Cup	2	1,400 m (Firm)	18	18	4.4 (2)	2nd	1:20.2	0.0	Cristian Demuro	Diatonic
2023 – five-year-old season
Feb 26	Hanshin	Hankyu Hai	3	1,400 m (Firm)	15	7	1.7 (1)	7th	1:20.1	0.6	Mirai Iwata	Aguri
Mar 26	Chukyo	Takamatsunomiya Kinen	1	1,200 m (Heavy)	18	16	28.4 (10)	5th	1:12.0	0.5	Mirai Iwata	First Force
Oct 28	Kyoto	Swan Stakes	2	1,400 m (Firm)	18	8	5.6 (2)	6th	1:20.3	0.4	Mirai Iwata	Win Greatest
Dec 23	Hanshin	Hanshin Cup	2	1,400 m (Firm)	17	10	5.0 (3)	2nd	1:19.4	0.1	Ryan Moore	Win Marvel

Legend:
Turf

- R indicated that the finish was a record time.

== Pedigree ==
Pedigree of Grenadier Guards (JPN), bay colt, 2018
Sire Frankel (GB) 2008	Galileo (IRE); 1998	Sadler's Wells (USA)	Northern Dancer (CAN)
Sire Frankel (GB) 2008	Galileo (IRE); 1998	Sadler's Wells (USA)	Fairy Bridge
Sire Frankel (GB) 2008	Galileo (IRE); 1998	Urban Sea (USA)	Miswaki
Sire Frankel (GB) 2008	Galileo (IRE); 1998	Urban Sea (USA)	Allegretta (GB)
Sire Frankel (GB) 2008	Kind (IRE); 2001	Danehill (USA)	Danzig
Sire Frankel (GB) 2008	Kind (IRE); 2001	Danehill (USA)	Razyana
Sire Frankel (GB) 2008	Kind (IRE); 2001	Rainbow Lake (GB)	Rainbow Quest (USA)
Sire Frankel (GB) 2008	Kind (IRE); 2001	Rainbow Lake (GB)	Rockfest (USA)
Dam Wavell Avenue (CAN) 2011	Harlington (USA); 2002	Unbridled	Fappiano
Dam Wavell Avenue (CAN) 2011	Harlington (USA); 2002	Unbridled	Gana Facil
Dam Wavell Avenue (CAN) 2011	Harlington (USA); 2002	Serena's Song	Rahy
Dam Wavell Avenue (CAN) 2011	Harlington (USA); 2002	Serena's Song	Imagining
Dam Wavell Avenue (CAN) 2011	Lucas Street (CAN); 2004	Silver Deputy	Deputy Minister
Dam Wavell Avenue (CAN) 2011	Lucas Street (CAN); 2004	Silver Deputy	Silver Valley
Dam Wavell Avenue (CAN) 2011	Lucas Street (CAN); 2004	Ruby Park	Bold Ruckus
Dam Wavell Avenue (CAN) 2011	Lucas Street (CAN); 2004	Ruby Park	Katebyrne (Family: 10-a)
