= Hanshin Cup =

Hanshin Cup 阪神カップ
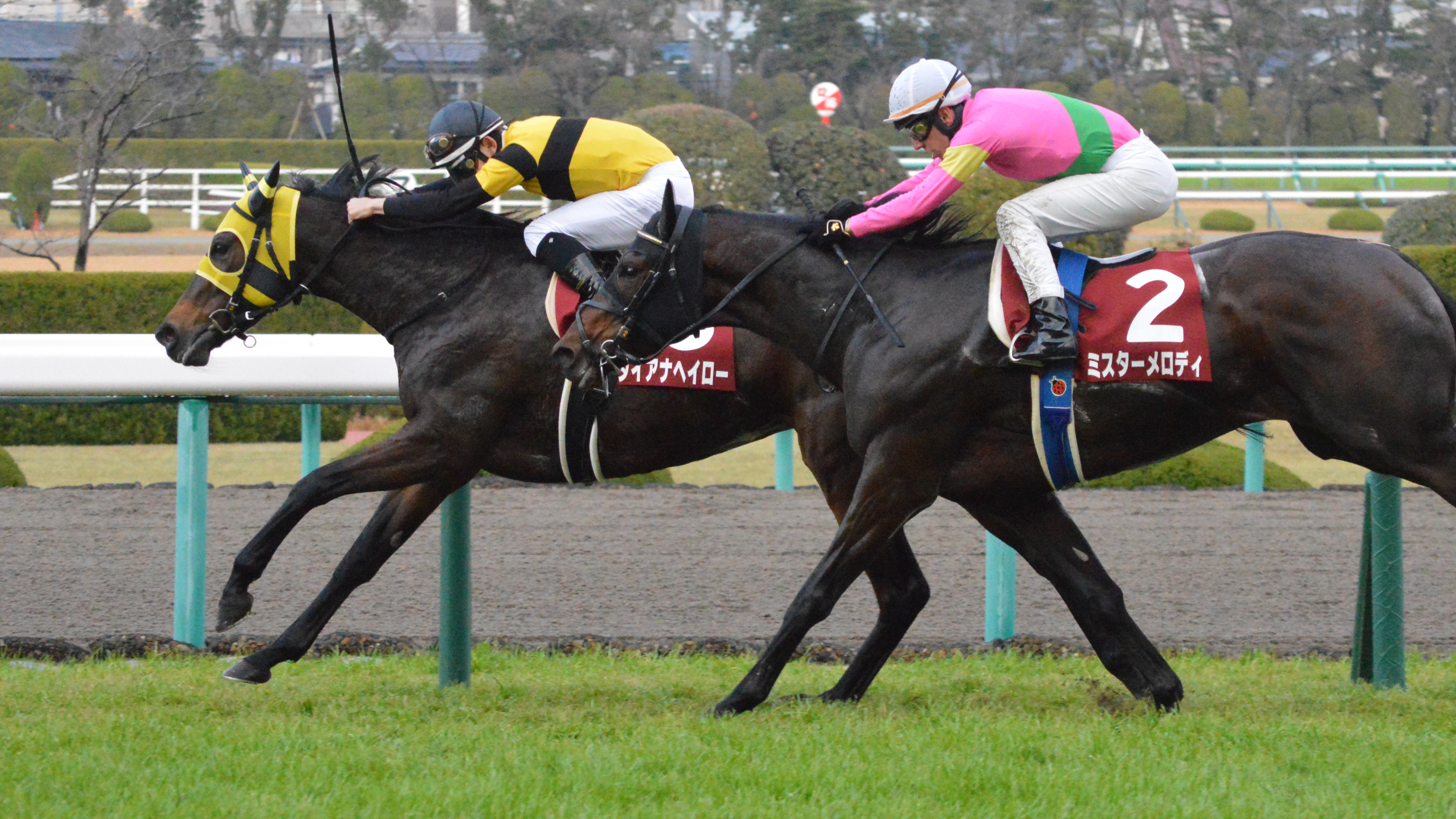
- Daiana Halo, winner of the 2018 Hanshin Cup
- Class: International Grade 2
- Location: Hanshin Racecourse, Takarazuka, Hyogo, Japan
- Inaugurated: 2006
- Race type: Thoroughbred Flat racing
- Website: japanracing.jp/

Race information
- Distance: 1400 meters
- Surface: Turf
- Track: Right-handed (inner course)
- Qualification: 3-y-o & Up, Thoroughbreds
- Weight: 3-y-o 57 kg \ 4-y-o & up 58 kg Allowance: Fillies and Mares 2 kg
- Purse: ¥ 145,220,000 (as of 2025): 1st: ¥ 67,000,000; 2nd: ¥ 27,000,000; 3rd: ¥ 17,000,000

The Hanshin Cup (阪神カップ, Hanshin Kappu) is a Grade 2 race in Japan. It is held at Hanshin Racecourse in Takarazuka, Hyogo.

The race was first run in 2006 and is run over 1,400 metres (about 7 furlongs) on the inner turf course. It was upgraded to international status in 2009.

Due to the race calendar's arrangement, it was the final graded race organized by JRA in the 2012 and 2013 seasons, being held even after the Arima Kinen (which is usually the final graded race in the Japanese horseracing calendar).

== List of winners ==
Year	Winner	Age	Jockey	Trainer	Owner	Time
2006	Fusaichi Richard	3	Yuichi Fukunaga	Kunihide Matsuda	Fusao Sekiguchi	1:20.6
2007	Suzuka Phoenix	5	Yutaka Take	Mitsuru Hashida	Keiji Nagai	1:20.6
2008	Maruka Phoenix	4	Yuichi Fukunaga	Masahiro Matsunaga	Kawacho Sangyo	1:21.6
2009	Kinshasa no Kiseki	6	Mirco Demuro	Noriyuki Hori	Kazumi Yoshida	1:20.4
2010	Kinshasa no Kiseki	7	Christophe Soumillon	Noriyuki Hori	Kazumi Yoshida	1:20.3
2011	San Carlo	5	Yutaka Yoshida	Yokichi Okubo	Shadai Race Horse Co Ltd	1:20.5
2012	San Carlo	6	Yutaka Yoshida	Yokichi Okubo	Shadai Race Horse Co Ltd	1:21.0
2013	Real Impact	5	Ryan Moore	Noriyuki Hori	U Carrot Farm	1:21.4
2014	Real Impact	6	William Buick	Noriyuki Hori	U Carrot Farm	1:20.7
2015	Rosa Gigantea	4	Mirco Demuro	Kazuo Fujisawa	Shadai Race Horse Co Ltd	1:21.4
2016	Shuji	3	Yuga Kawada	Naosuke Sugai	Koji Yasuhara	1:21.9
2017	Isla Bonita	6	Christophe Lemaire	Hironori Kurita	Shadai Race Horse Co Ltd	1:19.5
2018	Diana Halo	5	Yuji Hishida	Hiroyuki Oneda	Komahide	1:21.1
2019	Gran Alegria	3	Christophe Lemaire	Kazuo Fujisawa	Sunday Racing	1:19.4
2020	Danon Fantasy	4	Yusuke Fujioka	Mitsumasa Nakauchida	Danox	1:19.7
2021	Grenadier Guards	3	Cristian Demuro	Mitsumasa Nakauchida	Sunday Racing	1:20.3
2022	Diatonic	7	Yasunari Iwata	Takayuki Yasuda	Silk Racing	1:20.2
2023	Win Marvel	4	Kohei Matsuyama	Masashi Fukayama	Win Co Ltd	1:19.3
2024 (Note: The 2024 running took place at Kyoto while Hanshin was closed for redevelopment)	Namura Clair	5	Christophe Lemaire	Kodai Hasegawa	Mutsuhiro Namura	1:20.1
2025	Lugal	5	Katsuma Sameshima	Haruki Sugiyama	Yoshimasa Ema	1:19.0 (Note: Broke the current track record)

== See also ==
- Horse racing in Japan
- List of Japanese flat horse races
