= Gran Alegria =

Japanese-bred Thoroughbred racehorse

Gran Alegria グランアレグリア
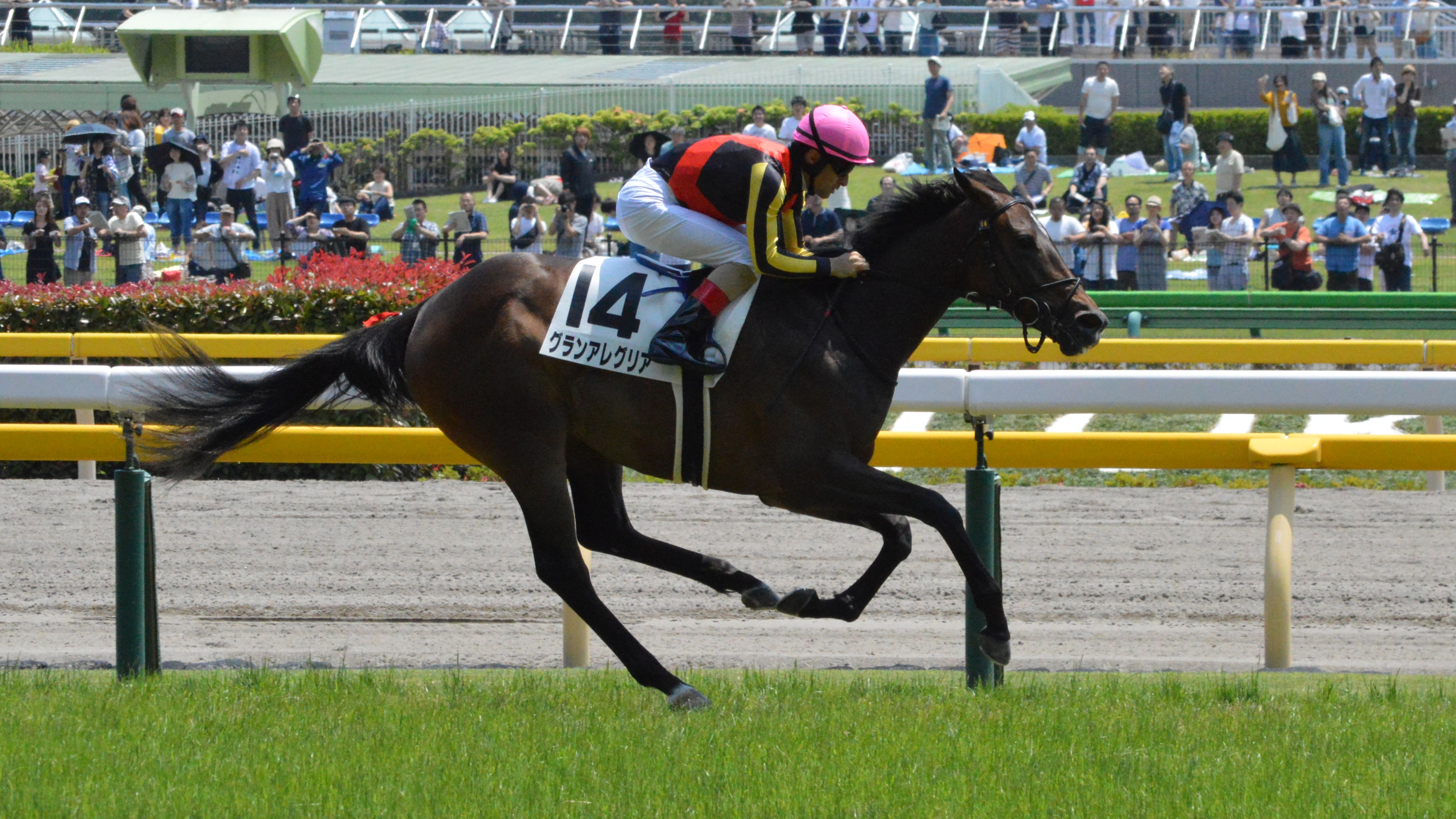
- Gran Alegria during her maiden race in 2018.
- Breed: Thoroughbred
- Sire: Deep Impact
- Grandsire: Sunday Silence
- Dam: Tapitsfly
- Damsire: Tapit
- Sex: Mare
- Foaled: January 24, 2016 (age 10)
- Country: Japan
- Colour: Bay
- Breeder: Northern Farm
- Owner: Sunday Racing
- Racing colours
- Trainer: Kazuo Fujisawa
- Jockey: Christophe Lemaire; Kenichi Ikezoe
- Record: 15: 9-2-2
- Earnings: JPY1,073,813,000

Major wins
- Saudi Arabia Royal Cup (2018); Hanshin Cup (2019); Yasuda Kinen (2020); Sprinters Stakes (2020); Mile Championship (2020, 2021); Victoria Mile (2021); Japanese Classic Tiara Race wins: Oka Sho (2019)

Awards
- JRA Award for Best Three-Year-Old Filly (2019); JRA Award for Best Sprinter or Miler (2020, 2021)

Gran Alegria (Japanese: グランアレグリア, Hepburn: Guran Areguria; foaled 24 January 2016) is a retired Japanese Thoroughbred racehorse and broodmare. After winning a minor race on her debut in 2018 she won the Saudi Arabia Royal Cup before running third in the Asahi Hai Futurity Stakes. On her first appearance as a three-year-old she won the Oka Sho. In 2020 and 2021 she dominated sprint and mile races in Japan, whilst also challenging mid-distance races in between. She won the Yasuda Kinen, Sprinters Stakes, Victoria Mile and Mile Championship, recording victories in the latter one twice. She was the first Japanese horse to win all mile races for 3 year olds and up.

== Background ==
Gran Alegria is a bay mare with a white star bred in Japan by Northern Farm. During her racing career she has carried the colours of Sunday Racing and has been trained by Kazuo Fujisawa. The filly has been ridden in most of her races by Christophe Lemaire.

She was from the ninth crop of foals sired by Deep Impact, who was the Japanese Horse of the Year in 2005 and 2006, winning races including the Tokyo Yushun, Tenno Sho, Arima Kinen and Japan Cup. Deep Impact's other progeny include Gentildonna, Harp Star, Kizuna, A Shin Hikari, Marialite and Saxon Warrior. Gran Alegria's dam Tapitsfly was a top class American racemare whose wins included the Breeders' Cup Juvenile Fillies Turf, Just A Game Stakes and First Lady Stakes. She was exported to Japan after being sold for $1,850,000 at the Fasig-Tipton sale. She was a female-line descendant of Pink Dove, who was a half-sister to Golden Pheasant.

== Racing career ==
=== 2018: two-year-old season ===
Gran Alegria made her racecourse debut in a maiden race over 1600 metres at Tokyo Racecourse on 3 June and won by two lengths from fourteen opponents headed by Danon Fantasy. After a four-month break the filly returned for the Grade 3 Saudi Arabia Royal Cup over the same course and distance on 6 October when she was matched against male opposition. Starting the 3/10 favourite she came home three and a half lengths clear of the colt De Gaulle. Instead of contesting Japan's premier race for two-year-old fillies, the Hanshin Juvenile Fillies (which was won in her absence by Danon Fantasy), Gran Alegria faced the colts again in the Asahi Hai Futurity Stakes over 1600 metres at Hanshin Racecourse on 16 December and was made the 1/2 favourite. After racing in second place for most of the way she disputed the lead with Admire Mars in the straight before fading in the final strides and coming home third behind Admire Mars and the 76/1 outsider Kurino Gaudí.

=== 2019: three-year-old season ===
Gran Alegria began her second campaign in the Grade 1 Oka Sho over 1600 metres at Hanshin on 6 April in which she started the 2.4/1 second favourite behind Danon Fantasy. The other sixteen runners included Chrono Genesis (Queen Cup) as well as No One and Pourville who had run a dead-heat in the Fillies' Revue. After racing in fourth behind the front-running Pourville, Gran Alegria took the lead entering the straight, broke clear of the field and came home two and a half lengths clear of Shigeru Pink Dia. Her winning time of 1:32.7 broke the race record set by Almond Eye in 2018. Christophe Lemaire commented "She certainly won strongly today. I was a little bit worried as it was her first time out after a long break. She was unable to make use of her speed in the Asahi Hai Futurity so I made sure this time to secure a good position early on and from there I had every confidence in her exceptional speed."

On 5 May Gran Alegria was matched against colts again when she was taken off of the tiara track for the NHK Mile Cup over 1600 metres at Tokyo and started the odds-on favourite. After tracking the leaders she kept on the straight but was unable to quicken in the closing stages and came home fourth behind Admire Mars. She was subsequently relegated to fifth for causing interference. The filly did not return to the track until 21 December when she was matched against older horses in the 1400 metre Hanshin Cup and started the 1.1/1 favourite. Lemaire settled Gran Alegria in mid-division before moving to the front 200 metres from the finish and pulling clear to win by five lengths from the five-year-old Fiano Romano.

In January 2020, at the JRA Awards for 2019, Gran Alegria took the JRA Award for Best Three-Year-Old Filly, taking 121 of the 274 votes to win from Loves Only You and Chrono Genesis.

=== 2020: four-year-old season ===
The 2020 flat racing season in Japan was impacted by the COVID-19 pandemic and most events took place behind closed doors. For her first run of the year Gran Alegria was dropped back to sprint distances for the Grade 1 Takamatsunomiya Kinen over 1200 metres at Chukyo Racecourse on 29 March in which she was ridden by Kenichi Ikezoe and started at the 3.1/1 second favourite. After racing towards the rear of the field on the outside she produced a strong late run and in a four-way photo finish she finished third behind Kurino Gaudi and Mozu Superflare (beaten a short head by the winner) with Diatonic taking fourth place. She was promoted to second when Kurino Gaudi was disqualified for causing interference in the closing stages. On 7 June at Tokyo, with Ikezoe again in the saddle, Gran Alegria went off the 11/1 third choice behind Almond Eye and Indy Champ for the 70th running of the Grade 1 Yasuda Kinen over 1600 metres. The other eleven contenders included Danon Premium, Admire Mars, Normcore, Mr Melody (2019 Takamatsunomiya Kinen), Persian Knight (Mile Championship) and Keiai Nautique (2018 NHK Mile Cup). Gran Alegria settled behind the leading group as Danon Smash set the pace before moving into contention on the outside on the final turn. She took the lead approaching the last 200 metres and broke clear of her rivals to win by two and a half lengths from Almond Eye, who got the better of Indy Champ and Normcore in a close finish for second place. After the race Ikezoe said "I was focused on keeping her in good rhythm and in a good position which all worked out beautifully. She just gave her best with such a tenacious run down the stretch. I was afraid up to the line that we were going to be caught, especially by Almond Eye. I hurt myself when a chunk of grass hit my eye at the third corner, but it doesn't hurt at all now!"

After a summer break of almost five months Gran Alegria took on the specialist sprinters for the second time in the Grade 1 Sprinters Stakes over 1200 metres at Nakayama Racecourse on 4 October. Ridden by Lemaire, she started the 1.2/1 favourite against fifteen opponents including Danon Smash, Mozu Superflare, Mr Melody, Diatonic and Kurino Gaudi. Gran Alegria started slowly and was in fifteenth place as she move to the outside on the final turn, but then "mowed down" the opposition, took the lead 50 metres from the finish and won by two lengths from Danon Smash. Lemaire commented "I can't believe how strong she is! She was a little slow to get into the rhythm and we were much further back than expected but we did not panic... she certainly showed what she is made of."

On 22 November at Hanshin Gran Alegria started the 0.6/1 favourite for the 37th running of the Mile Championship in a seventeen-runner field which also included Salios, Indy Champ, Resistencia, Admire Mars, Lauda Sion and Persian Knight. She started well and settled behind the leaders as Resistencia set a steady pace before making a forward move approaching the final turn but appeared to be boxed in and unlikely to obtain a clear run in the straight. She had to be switched to the outside to find room to race but then produced a strong burst of acceleration to gain the advantage in the final strides and won by three quarters of a length from Indy Champ. After the race Lemaire said "She's matured and a lot easier to ride now being a four-year-old so she was relaxed and we had a good trip until the last turn where, as a favorite you're marked and it so happens, but we weren’t able to make our move to the outside smoothly for the stretch run. I was a little worried but the way she exploded into gear in the last 150 meters, it just shows how powerful she is."

In January 2021, Gran Alegria was voted Best Sprinter or Miler at the JRA Awards for 2020. In the 2020 World's Best Racehorse Rankings, Gran Alegria was rated on 121, making her the equal 34th best racehorse in the world.

=== 2021: five-year-old season ===
The owner had an ambition to extend the race distance Gran Alegria would ran with a goal of Tenno Sho (Autumn) in mind. The team registered her to race in the Osaka Hai, a 2000 metres races. In this race, she would contested against the likes of Contrail (the last year triple crown winner). The race was held on a heavy ground. She managed to tag along Contrail for the majority but failed to hold on the sprint, ended up in fourth-place behind Lei Papale (the winner), Mozu Bello and Contrail himself. His jockey that race, Lemaire claimed that the heavy ground was the one that inhibited her full spurt as she was calm and composed for the whole race. Gran Alegria then proceed onto the Victoria Mile in May after that race. This time, she broke well from the stall six, ran on the outside track on the corners, unleashed her finishing sprint 200 metres to the line for the win four lengths ahead of the second place, Rambling Alley. This win made Gran Alegria became the first horse to win all three G1 mile races (Victoria Mile, Yasuda Kinen and Mile Championships) for four-years-and-older horse. She also got a berth in the Breeders' Cup Filly & Mare Turf that year with this win but this slot never materialised in the end.

After a short break of two weeks, Gran Alegria attempted to defend her title last season in the Yasuda Kinen. With Almond Eye retirement the previous year, this race will go down between four competitors such as Indy Champ, Danon Kingly and Danon Premium. Unlike her usual performance, Gran Alegria did not had enough speed as her usual day but she still managed to make a late charge on the inside track at the final phase. In the end, she was unable to catch Danon Kingly and lost the race by a head. For this race, Lemaire blamed himself for not having quick enough reaction to adept for the non-optimal Gran Alegria condition. In the summer, Gran Alegria got a throat surgery to remove her epiglottis entrapment. When autumn came, she joined the Autumn Tenno Sho as being planned at the beginning of the season. The field for this race was highly competitive as the three heavyweights like Contrail, Efforia (2021 Satsuki Sho winner) and herself were running at the same time. The race started well for Gran Alegria as she had a duel with Kaiser Minoru for the position before overtook him at the center of the course. She was inching down the lead near the race ending but did not manage to exert enough force for catching the leading Efforia. She finished in third, one length behind Efforia and a neck behind a late surging Contrail who managed to surpass her in the end.

On November 17, it was announced that Gran Alegria would race in the Mile Championship in Kyoto, which eventually marked up as her retirement race. Her trainer, Fujisawa just hope Gran Alegria would finish the race in a good way after two years of hard work in racing. She reciprocated that request in an excellent performance as she coasted early, positioned herself well to secure a clear path on the final corner, turned the gear up on the final stretch and grabbed the title by three-quarters margin over Schnell Meister who finished in second. She became the sixth horse to defend this title after Daiwa Major in 2006 and 2007 season.She was also the first ever mare to gain this achievement. One month later on December 18, her retirement ceremony was held. She would be assigned back to the Northern Farm, located in Abira, Hokkaido for broodmare duty.

In January 2022, Gran Alegria was awarded for the second time as the best sprinter or miler at the JRA Awards for 2021. In the 2021 World's Best Racehorse Rankings, Gran Alegria gained a rating of 120, making her equal 36th best racehorse in the world.

== Racing form ==
Gran Alegria ran in 15 races, gained nine wins and placed in four others. This data is available on JBIS and netkeiba.

Date	Track	Race	Grade	Distance (Condition)	Entry	HN	Odds (Favored)	Finish	Time	Margins	Jockey	Winner (Runner-up)
2018 – two-year-old season
Jun 3	Tokyo	2yo Newcomer		1,600 m (Firm)	15	14	1.8 (1)	1st	1:33.6	–0.3	Christophe Lemaire	(Danon Fantasy)
Oct 6	Tokyo	Saudi Arabia Royal Cup	3	1,600 m (Firm)	8	4	1.3 (1)	1st	1:34.0	–0.6	Christophe Lemaire	(De Gaulle)
Dec 16	Hanshin	Asahi Hai Futurity Stakes	1	1,600 m (Firm)	15	2	1.5 (1)	3rd	1:34.3	0.4	Christophe Lemaire	Admire Mars
2019 – three-year-old season
Apr 7	Hanshin	Oka Sho	1	1,600 m (Firm)	18	8	3.4 (2)	1st	1:32.7	–0.4	Christophe Lemaire	(Shigeru Pink Dia)
May 5	Tokyo	NHK Mile Cup	1	1,600 m (Firm)	18	7	1.5 (1)	5th (Note: Demoted from 4th place due to the penalty.)	1:32.7	0.3	Christophe Lemaire	Admire Mars
Dec 16	Hanshin	Hanshin Cup	2	1,400 m (Firm)	18	5	2.1 (1)	1st	1:19.4	–0.8	Christophe Lemaire	(Fiano Romano)
2020 – four-year-old season
Mar 29	Chukyo	Takamatsunomiya Kinen	1	1,200 m (Soft)	18	8	4.1 (2)	2nd (Note: Finished third in the race, promoted to second after Kurino Gaudi being demoted)	1:08.7	0.0	Kenichi Ikezoe	Mozu Superflare
Jun 7	Tokyo	Yasuda Kinen	1	1,600 m (Good)	14	11	12.0 (3)	1st	1:31.6	–0.4	Kenichi Ikezoe	(Almond Eye)
Oct 4	Nakayama	Sprinters Stakes	1	1,200 m (Firm)	16	10	2.2 (1)	1st	1:08.3	–0.3	Christophe Lemaire	(Danon Smash)
Nov 22	Hanshin	Mile Championship	1	1,600 m (Firm)	17	4	1.6 (1)	1st	1:32.0	–0.1	Christophe Lemaire	(Indy Champ)
2021 – five-year-old season
Apr 4	Hanshin	Osaka Hai	1	2,000 m (Soft)	13	12	2.8 (2)	4th	2:02.5	0.9	Christophe Lemaire	Lei Papale
May 16	Tokyo	Victoria Mile	1	1,600 m (Firm)	18	6	1.3 (1)	1st	1:31.0	–0.7	Christophe Lemaire	(Rambling Alley)
Jun 6	Tokyo	Yasuda Kinen	1	1,600 m (Firm)	14	5	1.5 (1)	2nd	1:31.7	0.0	Christophe Lemaire	Danon Kingly
Oct 31	Tokyo	Tenno Sho (Autumn)	1	2,000 m (Firm)	16	9	2.8 (2)	3rd	1:58.1	0.2	Christophe Lemaire	Efforia
Nov 21	Hanshin	Mile Championship	1	1,600 m (Firm)	16	12	1.7 (1)	1st	1:32.6	–0.1	Christophe Lemaire	(Schnell Meister)

Legend:
Turf

== Breeding career ==
c = colt, f = filly

No.	Name	Foaled	Sex	Color	Sire	Wins	Races	Remarks
1st	Gran Maestro	2023	c	Chestnut	Epiphaneia	0	9	Active
2nd	Suprema Reina	2024	f	Dark Bay	Maurice	0	1	Active
3rd	(Gran Alegria 2025)	2025	c	Chestnut	Saturnalia			
4th	(Gran Alegria 2026)	2026	c	Bay	Lord Kanaloa			

== In popular culture ==
An anthropomorphized version of Gran Alegria appears as a character in the Japanese multimedia franchise Umamusume: Pretty Derby, voiced by Hina Natsume. She is depicted as an upbeat, assertive, and highly athletic girl who practices gymnastics and healthy lifestyle habits, and has an unusual obsession with the concept of a mile, referencing her real-life counterpart's overwhelming successes in mile races. Her fixation with miles is reflected in her bizarre set of lifestyle rules based around the length of one, as well as her tendency to use wordplay that mixes the predicates in her sentences with the word "mile".

== Pedigree ==
Pedigree of Gran Alegria (JPN), bay mare, 2016
Sire Deep Impact (JPN) 2002	Sunday Silence (USA); 1986	Halo	Hail to Reason
Sire Deep Impact (JPN) 2002	Sunday Silence (USA); 1986	Halo	Cosmah
Sire Deep Impact (JPN) 2002	Sunday Silence (USA); 1986	Wishing Well	Understanding
Sire Deep Impact (JPN) 2002	Sunday Silence (USA); 1986	Wishing Well	Mountain Flower
Sire Deep Impact (JPN) 2002	Wind in Her Hair (IRE); 1991	Alzao (USA)	Lyphard
Sire Deep Impact (JPN) 2002	Wind in Her Hair (IRE); 1991	Alzao (USA)	Lady Rebecca (GB)
Sire Deep Impact (JPN) 2002	Wind in Her Hair (IRE); 1991	Burghclere (GB)	Busted
Sire Deep Impact (JPN) 2002	Wind in Her Hair (IRE); 1991	Burghclere (GB)	Highclere
Dam Tapitsfly (USA) 2007	Tapit; 2001	Pulpit	A.P. Indy
Dam Tapitsfly (USA) 2007	Tapit; 2001	Pulpit	Preach
Dam Tapitsfly (USA) 2007	Tapit; 2001	Tap Your Heels	Unbridled
Dam Tapitsfly (USA) 2007	Tapit; 2001	Tap Your Heels	Ruby Slippers
Dam Tapitsfly (USA) 2007	Flying Marlin; 1999	Marlin	Sword Dance
Dam Tapitsfly (USA) 2007	Flying Marlin; 1999	Marlin	Syrian Summer
Dam Tapitsfly (USA) 2007	Flying Marlin; 1999	Morning Dove	Fortunate Propect
Dam Tapitsfly (USA) 2007	Flying Marlin; 1999	Morning Dove	Pink Dove (Family: 3-o)
