= Erdenali =

French-bred Thoroughbred racehorse

- Racing Silks of Aga Khan
- Breed: Thoroughbred
- Sire: Caravaggio
- Grandsire: Scat Daddy
- Dam: Erdana
- Damsire: Sea The Stars
- Sex: Gelding
- Foaled: 12 March 2023 (age 3)
- Country: France
- Colour: Gray
- Owner: Aga Khan IV
- Trainer: Francis-Henri Graffard
- Jockey: Mickael Barzalona
- Record: 6 : 5-0-1
- Earnings: € 1,556,300

Major wins
- Prix du Moulin de Longchamp (2026); Mile Championship (2026)

Erdenali (foaled 12 March 2023) is a French Thoroughbred racehorse notable for winning the Prix du Moulin de Longchamp and Mile Championship in 2026. He is owned by the estate of Aga Khan IV and trained by Francis-Henri Graffard.

== Background ==
Before making his debut as a racehorse, Erdenali was gelded in early 2025 as a two year old as "he was very difficult when he came to training" according to Nemone Routh, the manager for the Aga Khan Studs.

== Racing career ==
=== 2026: three-year old season ===
Erdenali debuted on 29 March at the Prix Kashmir II maiden stakes held at Saint-Cloud Racecourse, where he would win the race by six and a half lengths. The horse was then entered to the Prix Des Tertres on 7 May, where he would win the race again, this time by a two length lead. The horse also won the Listed Prix de Saint-Patrick, before having his first defeat of his career, which was also his first group race, the Prix Messidor; in which he finished third.

Erdenali was then entered in to his first group one race, the Prix du Moulin de Longchamp. He was one of seven horses to start, but handily won the race by a length and a quarter; keeping in pace with the leader for most of the race before taking the lead in the last furlong.

After winning his first group one race, Erdenali's connections initially planned to send him to the United States for the Breeders' Cup Mile. However, on 30 September, trainer Graffard announced that the horse is to contest the Mile Championship on 22 November in Kyoto Racecourse in Japan instead.

At the Mile Championship, the horse was the fourth favored, with the horse given the most inside starting gate. After making a start, he would be placed in the middle of the pack, trailing Embroidery and World's End. After entering the home stretch, the horse made the most of the inside and took over Embroidery, finishing with a three-quarter length win, becoming the first foreign horse to win the Mile Championship and the 2nd Horse owned by the Aga Khan Stud to win a Group 1 race in Japan since Calandagan in the 2025 Japan Cup.

== Racing statistics ==
Date	Distance (Condition)	Race	Class	Course	Field	Finish	Time (Note: Official time of winning horse. The time written in grey doesn't belong to Erdenali.)	Winning (Losing) Margin	Jockey	Winner (2nd place)
2026 – three-year-old season
29 Mar	1 Mile (Soft)	Prix Kashmir II		Saint-Cloud	13	1st	1:45.63	6 1/12 lengths	Mickael Barzalona	(Tocoa)
7 May	1 Mile (Very Soft)	Prix Des Tertres		Longchamp	6	1st	1:46.23	2 lengths	Mickael Barzalona	(Go Man)
27 Jun	7 1/2 f (Standard to Slow)	Prix de Saint-Patrick	Listed	Deauville	7	1st	1:28.55	2 1/2 lengths	Mickael Barzalona	(Take Me On)
19 Jul	1 Mile (Good)	Prix Messidor	G3	Chantilly	7	3rd	1:36.01	( 1/2 length)	Mickael Barzalona	Silius
6 Sep	1 Mile (Good to Firm)	Prix du Moulin de Longchamp	G1	Longchamp	7	1st	1:33.01	1 1/4 lengths	Mickael Barzalona	(Ten Bob Tony)
22 Nov	1600m (Good)	Mile Championship	G1	Kyoto	18	1st	1:31.8	3/4 length	Mickael Barzalona	(Embroidery)

== Pedigree ==
Pedigree of Erdenali
Sire Caravaggio gr. 2014	Scat Daddy dk.b. 2004	Johannesburg	Hennessy
Sire Caravaggio gr. 2014	Scat Daddy dk.b. 2004	Johannesburg	Myth
Sire Caravaggio gr. 2014	Scat Daddy dk.b. 2004	Love Style	Mr. Prospector
Sire Caravaggio gr. 2014	Scat Daddy dk.b. 2004	Love Style	Likeable Style
Sire Caravaggio gr. 2014	Mekko Hokte gr. 2000	Holy Bull	Great Above
Sire Caravaggio gr. 2014	Mekko Hokte gr. 2000	Holy Bull	Sharon Brown
Sire Caravaggio gr. 2014	Mekko Hokte gr. 2000	Aerosilver	Relaunch
Sire Caravaggio gr. 2014	Mekko Hokte gr. 2000	Aerosilver	Silver in Flight
Dam Erdana b. 2018	Sea The Stars b. 2006	Cape Cross	Green Desert
Dam Erdana b. 2018	Sea The Stars b. 2006	Cape Cross	Park Appeal
Dam Erdana b. 2018	Sea The Stars b. 2006	Urban Sea	Miswaki
Dam Erdana b. 2018	Sea The Stars b. 2006	Urban Sea	Allegretta
Dam Erdana b. 2018	Ervedya b. 2012	Siyouni	Pivotal
Dam Erdana b. 2018	Ervedya b. 2012	Siyouni	Sichilla
Dam Erdana b. 2018	Ervedya b. 2012	Elva	King's Best
Dam Erdana b. 2018	Ervedya b. 2012	Elva	Evora
