= Mile Championship =

Mile Championship マイルチャンピオンシップ
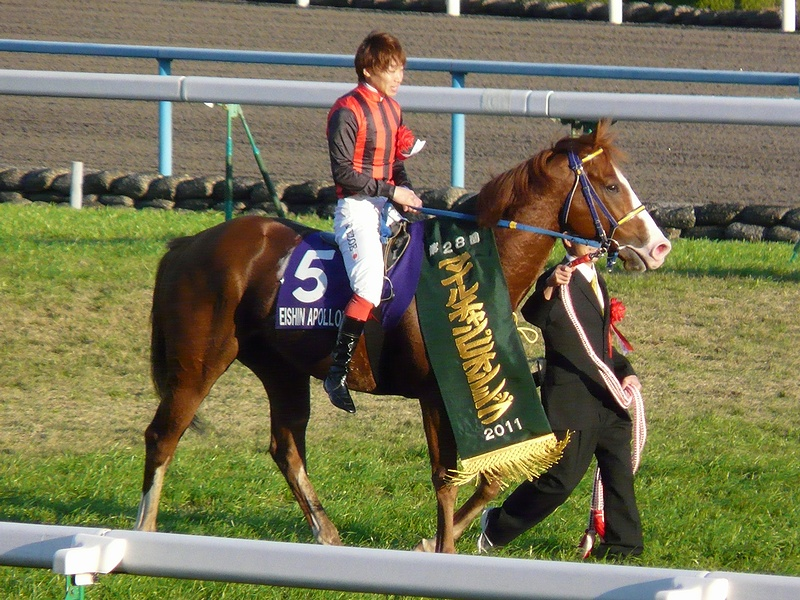
- The 28th (2011) winner Eishin Apllon
- Class: Grade 1
- Location: Kyoto Racecourse, Fushimi-ku, Kyoto, Kyoto Prefecture
- Inaugurated: November 18, 1984
- Race type: Thoroughbred
- Website: japanracing.jp/

Race information
- Distance: 1600 meters (About 8 furlongs / 1 mile)
- Record: Jantar Mantar, 1:31.5
- Surface: Turf
- Track: Right-handed
- Qualification: 3-y-o & Up, Thoroughbreds
- Weight: 3-y-o 57 kg / 4-y-o & up 58 kg Allowance: Fillies & Mares 2 kg
- Purse: ¥ 388,800,000 (as of 2025): 1st: ¥ 180,000,000; 2nd: ¥ 72,000,000; 3rd: ¥ 45,000,000

The Mile Championship is an International Grade I flat horse race in Japan for thoroughbreds three-year-old and above, run over a distance of 1,600 metres (approximately 1 mile) on the turf at Kyoto Racecourse in November. It was first run in 1984.

It is traditionally considered as a step race of Hong Kong Mile in Japan Racing. Particularly before the introduction of Hanshin Cup (Grade 2, 1400m) in 2006, as being the last graded event in mile distance in the Japan racing season and most of the winners or runners-up will travel to Hong Kong pursuing extra prize money. Including the only Japanese winner by then Hat Trick.

In 2026, Erdenali became the first foreign-trained horse to win the race.

== Trial races ==
Trial races provide automatic berths to the winning horses.

Race	Grade	Racecourse	Distance	Condition
Swan Stakes	GII	Kyoto	1,400 metres	Winner
Fuji Stakes	GII	Tokyo	1,600 metres	Winner

== Records ==
Speed record:

- 1.31.3 – Jantar Mantar (2025)

Most wins by a horse (2):

- Daitaku Helios (1991, 1992)
- Daiwa Major (2006, 2007)
- Durandal (2003, 2004)
- Gran Alegria (2020, 2021)
- Nihon Pillow Winner (1984, 1985)
- Taiki Shuttle (1997, 1998)

Most wins by a jockey (4):

- Kenichi Ikezoe (2003, 2004, 2011, 2019)

Most wins by a trainer (6):

- Kazuo Fujisawa (1993, 1997, 1998, 2001, 2020, 2021)

Most wins by an owner (3):

- Sunday Racing (2018, 2020, 2021)
- Carrot Farm (2005, 2008, 2023)

== Winners ==
Year	Winner	Age	Jockey	Trainer	Owner	Time
1984	Nihon Pillow Winner	4	Hiroshi Kawachi	Masatoshi Hattori	Hyakutaro Kobayashi	1:35.3
1985	Nihon Pillow Winner	5	Hiroshi Kawachi	Masatoshi Hattori	Hyakutaro Kobayashi	1:35.3
1986	Takara Steel	4	Yoshiyasu Tajima	Eizaburo Sakamoto	Yoshio Murayama	1:35.3
1987	Nippo Teio	4	Hiroyuki Gohara	Kinzo Kubota	Yuichi Yamaishi	1:34.9
1988	Soccer Boy	3	Hiroshi Kawachi	Yukiharu Ono	Shadai Race Horse	1:34.6
1989	Oguri Cap	4	Katsumi Minai	Tsutomu Setoguchi	Toshinori Kondo	1:34.6
1990	Passing Shot	5	Takashi Kusunoki	Mitsuru Hashida	Tadaharu Morimoto	1:33.6
1991	Daitaku Helios	4	Shigehiko Kishi	Yasuo Umeda	Masaichi Nakamura	1:34.8
1992	Daitaku Helios	5	Shigehiko Kishi	Yasuo Umeda	Masaichi Nakamura	1:33.3
1993	Shinko Lovely	4	Yukio Okabe	Kazuo Fujisawa	Osamu Yasuda	1:35.7
1994	North Flight	4	Koichi Tsunoda	Keiji Kato	Taihoku Bokujo	1:33.0
1995	Trot Thunder	6	Norihiro Yokoyama	Katsutoshi Aikawa	Teruo Fujimoto	1:33.7
1996	Genuine	4	Yukio Okabe	Yasuhisa Matsuyama	Shadai Race Horse Co., Ltd.	1:33.8
1997	Taiki Shuttle	3	Norihiro Yokoyama	Kazuo Fujisawa	Taiki Farm	1:33.3
1998	Taiki Shuttle	4	Yukio Okabe	Kazuo Fujisawa	Taiki Farm	1:33.3
1999	Air Jihad	4	Masayoshi Ebina	Masanori Ito	Lucky Field Co., Ltd.	1:32.8
2000	Agnes Digital	3	Hitoshi Matoba	Toshiaki Shirai	Takao Watanabe	1:32.6
2001	Zenno El Cid	4	Olivier Peslier	Kazuo Fujisawa	Shinobu Oosako	1:33.2
2002	Tokai Point	6	Masayoshi Ebina	Yoshiyuki Goto	Masanori Uchimura	1:32.8
2003	Durandal	4	Kenichi Ikezoe	Masahiro Sakaguchi	Teruya Yoshida	1:33.3
2004	Durandal	5	Kenichi Ikezoe	Masahiro Sakaguchi	Teruya Yoshida	1:33.0
2005	Hat Trick	4	Olivier Peslier	Katsuhiko Sumii	Carrot Farm Co., Ltd.	1:32.1
2006	Daiwa Major	5	Katsumi Ando	Hiroyuki Uehara	Keizo Oshiro	1:32.7
2007	Daiwa Major	6	Katsumi Ando	Hiroyuki Uehara	Keizo Oshiro	1:32.7
2008	Blumenblatt	5	Yutaka Yoshida	Sei Ishizaka	Carrot Farm	1:32.6
2009	Company	8	Norihiro Yokoyama	Hidetaka Otonashi	Hideko Kondo	1:33.2
2010	A Shin Forward	5	Yasunari Iwata	Masato Nishizono	Eishindo Co., Ltd.	1:31.8
2011	Eishin Apollon	4	Kenichi Ikezoe	Masahiro Matsunaga	Toyomitsu Hirai	1:33.9
2012	Sadamu Patek	4	Yutaka Take	Masato Nishizono	Sadamu Onishi	1:32.9
2013	Tosen Ra	5	Yutaka Take	Hideaki Fujiwara	Takaya Shimakawa	1:32.4
2014	Danon Shark	6	Yasunari Iwata	Ryuji Okubo	Danox Co Ltd	1:31.5
2015	Maurice	4	Ryan Moore	Noriyuki Hori	Kazumi Yoshida	1:32.8
2016	Mikki Isle	5	Suguru Hamanaka	Hidetaka Otonashi	Mizuki Noda	1:33.1
2017	Persian Knight	3	Mirco Demuro	Yasutoshi Ikee	G1 Racing Co Ltd	1:33.8
2018	Stelvio	3	William Buick	Tetsuya Kimura	Sunday Racing	1:33.3
2019	Indy Champ	4	Kenichi Ikezoe	Hidetaka Otonashi	Silk Racing	1:33.0
2020	Gran Alegria^{[a]}	4	Christophe Lemaire	Kazuo Fujisawa	Sunday Racing	1:32.0
2021	Gran Alegria^{[a]}	5	Christophe Lemaire	Kazuo Fujisawa	Sunday Racing	1:32.6
2022	Serifos^{[a]}	3	Damian Lane	Mitsumasa Nakauchida	G1 Racing	1:32.5
2023	Namur	4	Kota Fujioka	Tomokazu Takano	U.Carrot Farm	1:32.5
2024	Soul Rush	6	Taisei Danno	Yasutoshi Ikee	Tatsue Ishikawa	1:32.0
2025	Jantar Mantar	4	Yuga Kawada	Tomokazu Takano	Shadai Race Horse Co., Ltd.	1:31.3
2026	Erdenali	3	Mickael Barzalona	Francis-Henri Graffard	Aga Khan Studs SCEA	1:31.8

^{a} The 2020, 2021 and 2022 runnings took place at Hanshin while Kyoto was closed for redevelopment.

== See also ==
- Horse racing in Japan
- List of Japanese flat horse races
