= Yuga Kawada =

Japanese jockey (born 1985)

- Kawada in 2026 (Cluster Cup at Morioka)

Personal information
- Native name: 川田将雅
- Nationality: Japan
- Born: 15 October 1985 (age 41) Tosu, Saga
- Height: 159 cm (5 ft 3 in)
- Weight: 51 kg (112 lb)

Horse racing career
- Sport: Horse racing
- Career wins: 2161 (JRA); 67（NAR）

Major racing wins
- Breeders' Cup Filly & Mare Turf (2021); Dubai World Cup (2023); Hong Kong Cup (2021); Osaka Hai (2021); Kikuka Sho (2010); Oka Sho (2014, 2022, 2023); Satsuki Sho (2008); Takarazuka Kinen (2015); Tokyo Yushun (2016); Yasuda Kinen (2015, 2021); Yushun Himba (2012, 2023)

Significant horses
- Captain Thule, Danon Fantasy, Danon Kingly, Danon Premium, Danon Scorpion, Danon Smash, Danon The Kid, Grenadier Guards, Jantar Mantar, Lei Papale, Liberty Island, Lovely Day, Loves Only You, Makahiki, Mama Cocha, Ushba Tesoro, Wilson Tesoro

Yuga Kawada (Japanese: 川田将雅, born October 15, 1985) is a Japanese jockey affiliated with the Japan Racing Association. Born to a family of horse racing, he was the leading jockey of JRA races of 2022.

Since July 2016, Kawada, together with Yuichi Fukunaga, has a management contract with Horipro.

== Profile ==
Kawada debuted on March 7, 2004, and won his first race on the 20th of that same month. Kawada won his first graded race, the Kokura Daishoten, with Mejiro Meyer in 2006. Kawada won his first Grade I race and classic race with Captain Thule when they won the Satsuki Sho in 2008. The year before, he became the jockey to have ridden the first white horse to win a JRA race when he rode White Vessel at a maiden race held at Hanshin Racecourse on April 1, 2007.

Kawada became a Derby jockey in 2016 when he won the race with Makahiki. This race also marked his completion of all classic races in Japan, as he had also won the Kikuka Sho in 2010 with Big Week, the Yushun Himba with Gentildonna, and the Oka Sho with Harp Star by that point. On September 11 of that same year, Kawada became the 31st JRA jockey to have won a total of 1,000 races in his career.

In 2019, Kawada won the World All Star Jockeys that was held at Sapporo Racecourse.

In 2021, Kawada became the 9th JRA jockey ever to have won a total of 100 graded races in his career after winning the Takamatsunomiya Kinen with Danon Smash. That same year, Kawada won two GI races abroad, the Breeders' Cup Filly & Mare Turf held at Del Mar, and the Hong Kong Cup at Sha Tin, together with Loves Only You; with the former win being the first time a Japanese horse ever won that race.

In 2022, Kawada won the Oka Sho for the second time with Stars On Earth. That same year, he became the leading jockey in Japan for the first time in his career, as well as the best jockey by win rate and money earned; earning him the Grand Prize.

In 2023, Kawada became the first Japanese jockey to win the Dubai World Cup with Ushba Tesoro, and the first time since Victoire Pisa in 2011 for a Japanese horse to win the same race. That same year, Kawada became a Triple Tiara jockey after he won the Oka Sho, Yushun Himba, and Shuka Sho with Liberty Island. The final leg of the Triple Tiara, the Shuka Sho, was held on Kawada's 38th birthday.

== Personal life ==
Kawada's great-grandfather, Wakaya, was a retired jockey and horse trainer, as was his son (Yuga's grandfather) Toshimi. Toshimi's son and Yuga's father, Takayoshi, is a retired jockey and active horse trainer at Saga Racecourse. Masayuki Miyaura, who was the jockey for Inari One before becoming a trainer at Oi Racecourse, is Kawada's uncle.

Kawada married to Rei Otsuka, a tarento, in 2011. The two have a son named Ginji.

== Major wins ==
Yuga Kawada riding Danon Premium at The 2018 Tokyo Yushun (Japanese Derby, G1)

Japan

- Asahi Hai Futurity Stakes – (4) – Danon Premium (2017), Grenadier Guards (2020), Jantar Mantar (2023), Admire Zoom (2024)
- Champions Cup – (2) – Chuwa Wizard (2019), Chrysoberyl (2019)
- Haneda Hai – (1) – Amante Bianco (2024)
- Hanshin Juvenile Fillies – (1) – Liberty Island (2022)
- Hopeful Stakes – (1) – Danon The Kid (2020)
- Japan Breeding Farms' Cup Ladies' Classic – (2) – Teorema (2021), Anzu Ame (2026)
- Japan Breeding farms' Cup Classic – (3) – Chuwa Wizard (2018), Chrysoberyl (2020), Wilson Tesoro (2024)
- Japan Breeding farms' Cup Sprint – (2) – Suni (2009, 2011)
- Oka Sho – (3) – Harp Star (2013), Stars On Earth (2022), Liberty Island (2023)
- Osaka Hai – (1) – Lei Papale (2021)
- Kawasaki Kinen – (2) – Chuwa Wizard (2019, 2022)
- Kikuka Sho – (1) – Big Week (2010)
- Mile Championship – (1) – Jantar Mantar (2025)
- NHK Mile Cup – (2) – Danon Scorpion (2022), Jantar Mantar (2024)
- Queen Elizabeth II Cup – (1) – Lachesis (2014)
- Satsuki Sho – (1) – Captain Thule (2008)
- Shuka Sho – (1) – Liberty Island (2023)
- Sprinters Stakes – (2) – Fine Needle (2018), Mama Cocha (2023)
- Takamatsunomiya Kinen – (2) – Fine Needle (2018), Danon Smash (2019)
- Takarazuka Kinen – (1) – Lovely Day (2015)
- Teio Sho – (1) – Gold Blitz (2012)
- Tokyo Yushun – (1) – Makahiki (2016)
- Tokyo Daishōten – (1) – Ushba Tesoro (2023)
- Yasuda Kinen – (4) – Maurice (2015), Satono Aladdin (2016), Danon Kingly (2021), Jantar Mantar (2025)
- Yushun Himba – (2) – Gentildonna (2012), Liberty Island (2023)

Hong Kong

- Hong Kong Cup – (1) – Loves Only You (2021)

United States

- Breeders' Cup Filly & Mare Turf – (1) – Loves Only You (2021)

United Arab Emirates

- Dubai World Cup – (1) – Ushba Tesoro (2023)

== Bibliography ==
- Mitsuo, Okamoto, ed. (2020). "川田将雅 勝負師としての覚悟". 優駿. 914. Japan Racing Association: 47.
