= Hanshin Racecourse =

Racecourse in Japan

Coordinates: 34°46′48.80″N 135°21′45.00″E

Hanshin Racecourse 阪神競馬場
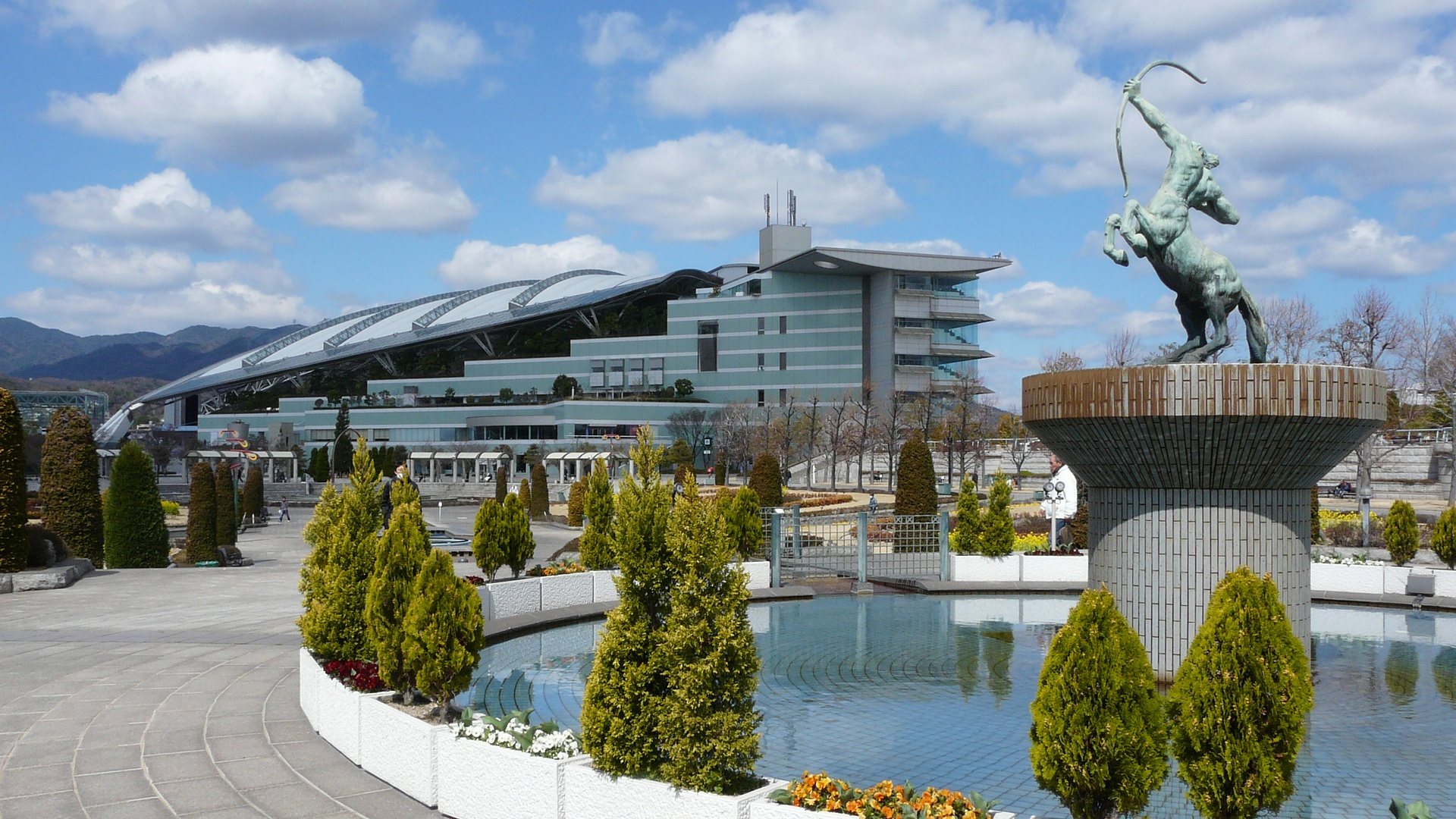
- The centaur statue at Hanshin Racecourse
- Interactive map of Hanshin Racecourse 阪神競馬場
- Location: Takarazuka, Hyogo, Japan
- Owned by: Japan Racing Association
- Date opened: 1949
- Screened on: KBS Kyoto (Sat); Kansai TV (Sun); TVG Network (USA)
- Course type: Thoroughbred - Flat racing, dirt racing, steeplechasing
- Notable races: Takarazuka Kinen; Osaka Hai; Oka Sho; Hanshin Juvenile Fillies; Asahi Hai Futurity Stakes

Hanshin Racecourse (阪神競馬場, Hanshin-keibajō) is located in Takarazuka, Hyogo, Japan. It has a capacity of 139,000 and is used for horse racing.

The land was originally owned by Kawanishi Aircraft Company, which manufactured combat planes during World War II. After World War II, GHQ ordered the company to stop manufacturing combat planes, which led to the closure of the factory. In 1949, Keihanshin Keiba K.K. built the Hanshin Racecourse. The racecourse was transferred to Japan Racing Association in 1955.

A major reconstruction was completed in 1991, and another in 2006. Beginning May 2024, the racecourse was closed for a year due to a grandstand renovation. The track's biggest events, the Takarazuka Kinen in June and the Hanshin Juvenile Fillies in December were both relocated to Kyoto Racecourse during the construction.

== Physical attributes ==
Hanshin Racecourse has two turf courses, a dirt course, and a jump course.

The turf's outer oval (外回り, sotomawari) measures 2089m (1 1/4 miles + 254 feet), and the inner oval (内回り, uchimawari) measures 1689m (1 mile + 261 feet). Two chutes allow races to be run at 1800m/1400m and 2600m/2200m, respectively. Races can be run on the "A Course" rail setting (on the hedge), or the "B Course" setting (rail out 4 meters). The dirt course measures 1518 meters (7/8 mile + 360 feet), with a 1400m chute.

The 2089m-long outer oval turf course was part of a major construction in 2006, and was a 400m-long extension. This would eventually remove two old chutes previously used, including a 1600m chute used for the currently-used 1689m-long inner oval course. The reconstruction (until the course was completely reconstructed) forced stakes races held in Hanshin during the second reconstruction period to be held in other racecourses, including Chukyo Racecourse and Kyoto Racecourse.

Hanshin Racecourse hosted the Japan Cup Dirt from 2008; races prior to that were held in Tokyo Racecourse. It has since been moved to Chukyo since 2015 and is now known as the Champions Cup.

== Notable races ==
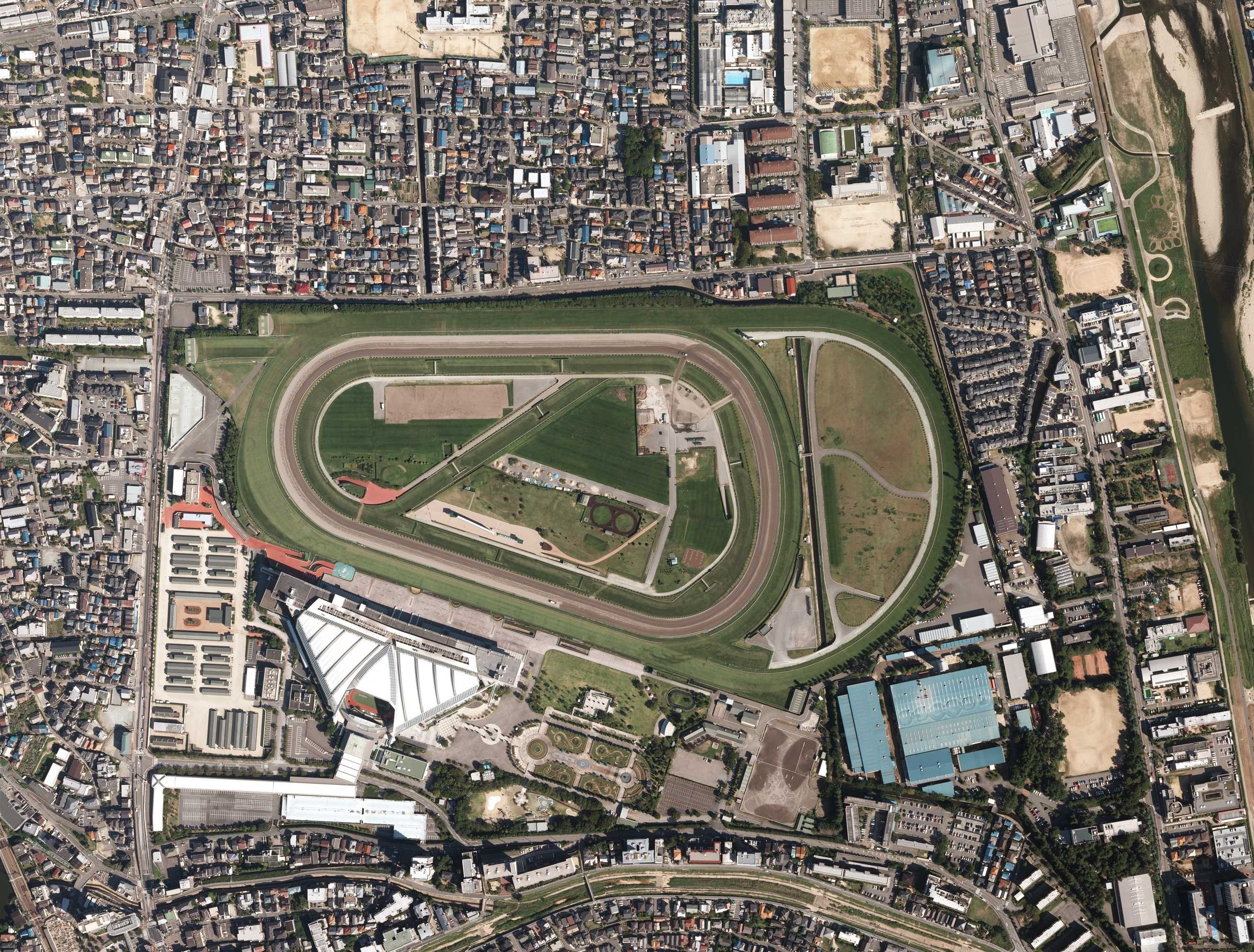
Aerial Photograph of the Hanshin Racecourse in 2012 by the National Land Image Information (Color Aerial Photographs)

Month	Race	Distance	Age/Sex
Grade I
Apr.	Osaka Hai	Turf 2000m	4yo +
Apr.	Oka Sho (Japanese 1,000 Guineas)	Turf 1600m out	3yo f
Jun.	Takarazuka Kinen	Turf 2200m	3yo +
Dec.	Hanshin Juvenile Fillies	Turf 1600m out	2yo f
Dec.	Asahi Hai Futurity Stakes	Turf 1600m out	2yo f
Grade II
Mar.	Tulip Sho (Oka Sho Trial)	Turf 1600m out	3yo f
Mar.	Fillies' Revue (Oka Sho Trial)	Turf 1400m	3yo f
Mar.	Hanshin Daishoten (Tenno Sho Trial)	Turf 3000m	4yo +
Apr.	Hanshin Himba Stakes (Victoria Mile Trial)	Turf 1600m	4yo + f
Sep.	Centaur Stakes (Sprinters Stakes Trial)	Turf 1200m	3yo +
Sep.	Rose Stakes (Shuka Sho Trial)	Turf 1800m out	3yo f
Sep.	Kobe Shimbun Hai (Kikuka Sho Trial)	Turf 2400m out	3yo c&f
Dec.	Hanshin Cup	Turf 1400m	3yo +
Grade III
Feb./Mar.	Hankyu Hai (Takamatsunomiya Kinen Trial)	Turf 1400m	4yo +
Mar.	Mainichi Hai	Turf 1800m out	3yo
Mar./Apr.	Churchill Downs Cup (NHK Mile Cup Trial)	Turf 1600m out	3yo
Apr.	Antares Stakes	Dirt 1800m	4yo +
Sep.	Challenge Cup (Handicap)	Turf 2000m	3yo +
Sep./Oct.	Sirius Stakes (Handicap)	Dirt 2000m	3yo +
Dec.	Naruo Kinen	Turf 1800m	3yo +
J-Grade II (Steeplechase)
Mar.	Hanshin Spring Jump	Turf 3900m	4yo +
J-Grade III (Steeplechase)
Sep	Hanshin Jump Stakes	Turf 3140m	3yo +

== Track records ==
Source：レコードタイム表 (Record time table) -> 阪神競馬場 (Hanshin Racecourse)

- † Reference Time.
- Last updated on June 20, 2026.

=== Turf course (2yo) ===
Distance	Time	Racehorse	Sex	Weight	Jockey	Date Recorded
1200m	1:08.2	Mild Claymore	Colt	55kg	Mirai Iwata	December 4, 2022
1400m	1:20.1	Meikei Yell	Filly	54kg	Yutaka Take	November 7, 2020
1600m	1:32.3	Grenadier Guards	Colt	55kg	Yuga Kawada	December 20, 2020
1800m	1:45.6	Obsession	Colt	55kg	Christophe Lemaire	December 2, 2017
2000m	1:59.7	Satono Helios	Colt	55kg	Mirai Iwata	December 11, 2021

=== Turf course (3yo+) ===
Distance	Time	Racehorse	Sex	Weight	Jockey	Date Recorded
1200m	1:06.7	Tower of London	Colt 4	57kg	Christophe Lemaire	September 8, 2019
1400m	1:18.9	Sonshi	Horse 5	57kg	Yuga Kawada	February 21, 2026
1600m	1:31.1	Sodashi	Filly 3	55kg	Hayato Yoshida	April 11, 2021
1800m	1:43.0	Masked Diva	Filly 3	54kg	Mirai Iwata	September 17, 2023
2000m	1:56.2	Bellagio Opera	Horse 5	58kg	Kazuo Yokoyama	April 6, 2025
2200m	2:09.7	Titleholder	Colt 4	58kg	Kazuo Yokoyama	June 26, 2022
2400m	2:23.2	Gamble Room	Horse 5	58kg	Hideaki Miyuki	March 29, 2026
2600m	2:35.1	Miss Mamma Mia	Mare 6	53kg	Yuichi Fukunaga	April 11, 2021
3000m	3:02.0	Admire Terra	Horse 5	58kg	Yutaka Take	March 22, 2026
3200m	3:14.7	World Premiere	Horse 5	58kg	Yuichi Fukunaga	May 2, 2021

=== Dirt course (2yo) ===
Distance	Time	Racehorse	Sex	Weight	Jockey	Date Recorded
1200m	1:11.0	Meine la Lonja	Filly	51kg	Bunshi Funabiki	December 12, 2007
1400m	1:23.0	Adirato	Colt	55kg	Yutaka Take	December 24, 2016
1800m	1:50.9	Tagano Galaxy	Colt	55kg	Futoshi Komaki	December 22, 2012

=== Dirt course (3yo+) ===
Distance	Time	Racehorse	Sex	Weight	Jockey	Date Recorded
1200m	1:08.8	Sweet Jewelry	Mare 5	55kg	Yuga Kawada	September 8, 2013
1400m	1:21.5	In Orario	Horse 7	56kg	Suguru Hamanaka	March 31, 2012
1800m	1:48.5	Saqalat	Colt 4	54kg	Yutaka Take	July 10, 2004
2000m	2:01.0	Wonder Speed	Horse 5	58kg	Futoshi Komaki	December 23, 2007
