= Danon Kingly =

Japanese Thoroughbred racehorse

Danon Kingly; ダノンキングリー
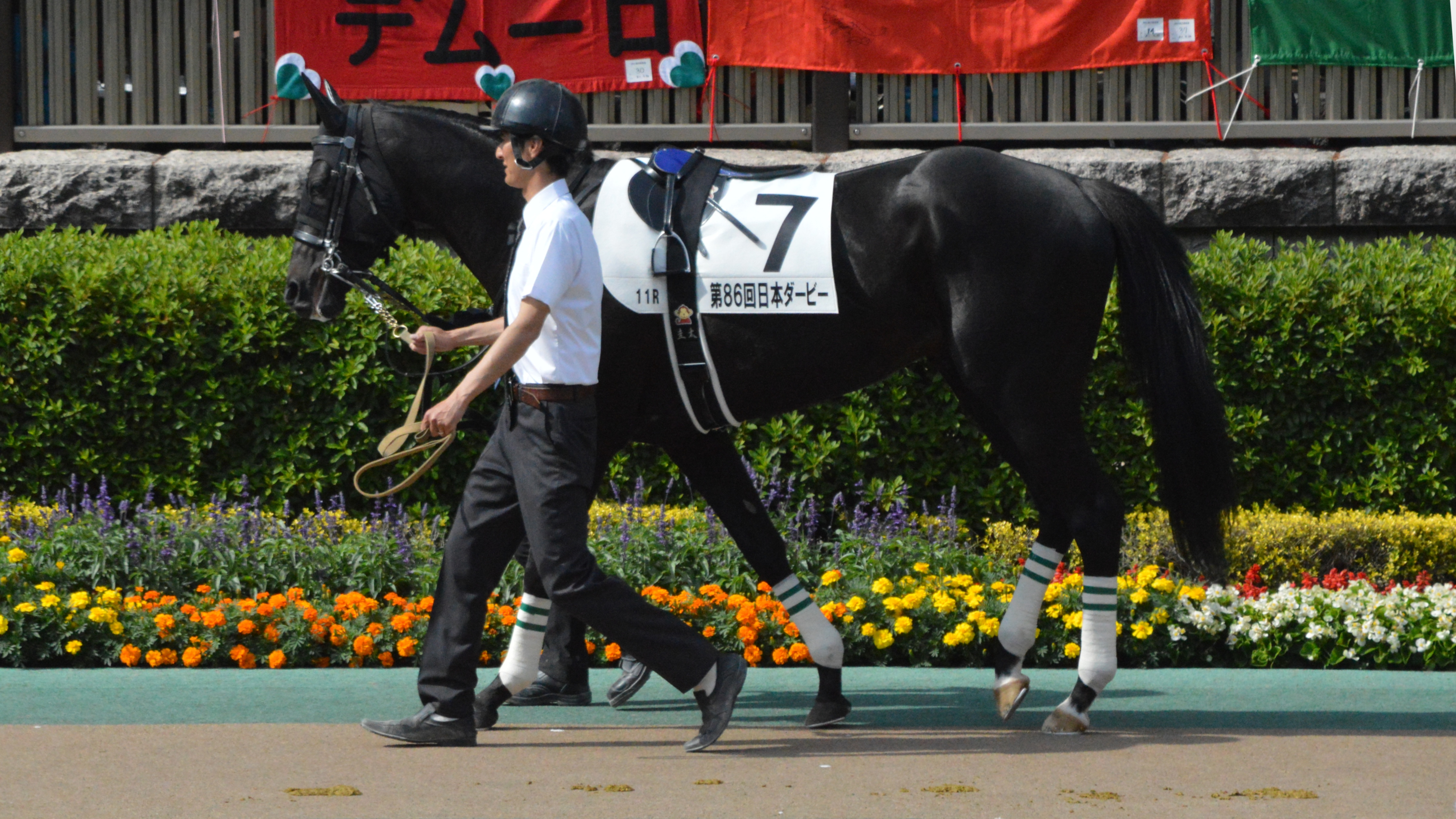
- Danon Kingly in 2019
- Sire: Deep Impact
- Grandsire: Sunday Silence
- Dam: My Goodness
- Damsire: Storm Cat
- Sex: Stallion
- Foaled: 25 March 2016
- Country: Japan
- Colour: Dark bay or brown
- Breeder: Mishima Bokujo
- Owner: Danox Co Ltd
- Racing colours
- Trainer: Kiyoshi Hagiwara
- Jockey: Keita Tosaki; Norihiro Yokoyama; Yuga Kawada
- Record: 12: 6-1-2
- Earnings: ¥487,796,000

Major wins
- Tokinominoru Kinen (2019); Mainichi Okan (2019); Nakayama Kinen (2020); Yasuda Kinen (2021)

Danon Kingly (Japanese: ダノンキングリー, foaled 25 March 2016) is a Japanese retired Thoroughbred racehorse. After winning both of his races as a two-year-old in 2018 he proved himself one of the best colts of his generation in the following year when he won the Tokinominoru Kinen and the Mainichi Okan as well as running second in the Tokyo Yushun and third in the Satsuki Sho. As a four-year-old he defeated a strong field to win the Nakayama Kinen and ran a close third in the Osaka Hai. In 2021 he recorded his first Grade 1 victory in the Yasuda Kinen.

== Background ==
Danon Kingly is a dark bay or brown horse with no white markings bred by Mishima Bokujo. He was sent into training with Kiyoshi Hagiwara and races in the white and red colours of Masahiro Noda's Danox Co Ltd.

He was from the ninth crop of foals sired by Deep Impact, who was the Japanese Horse of the Year in 2005 and 2006, winning races including the Tokyo Yushun, Tenno Sho, Arima Kinen and Japan Cup. Deep Impact's other progeny include Gentildonna, Harp Star, Kizuna, A Shin Hikari, Marialite and Saxon Warrior. Danon Kingly's dam My Goodness was a Kentucky-bred mare who showed modest racing ability, winning one minor race from six attempts. As a five-year-old she was offered for sale at Keeneland and was exported to Japan after being bought for $60,000 by Ever Union Shokai. My Goodness's dam Caressing won the Breeders' Cup Juvenile Fillies and produced several other winners including West Coast. She was a female-line descendant of Aphaona, a half-sister to Easton.

== Racing career ==
=== 2018: two-year-old season ===
On 8 October at Tokyo Racecourse Danon Kingly made his racecourse debut in an event for previously unraced juveniles over 1600 metres in which he was ridden by Keita Tosaki and started at odds of 4.4/1. He raced just behind the leaders before taking the lead in the straight and won by a head from the filly Curren Bouquet d'Or. The colt made his second and final appearance of the year in the Hiiragi Sho over the same distance on 15 December when he was again partnered by Tosaki. He went off the 3.6/1 second favourite and won by three and a half lengths from Mythologie after going to the front in the straight.

=== 2019: three-year-old season ===
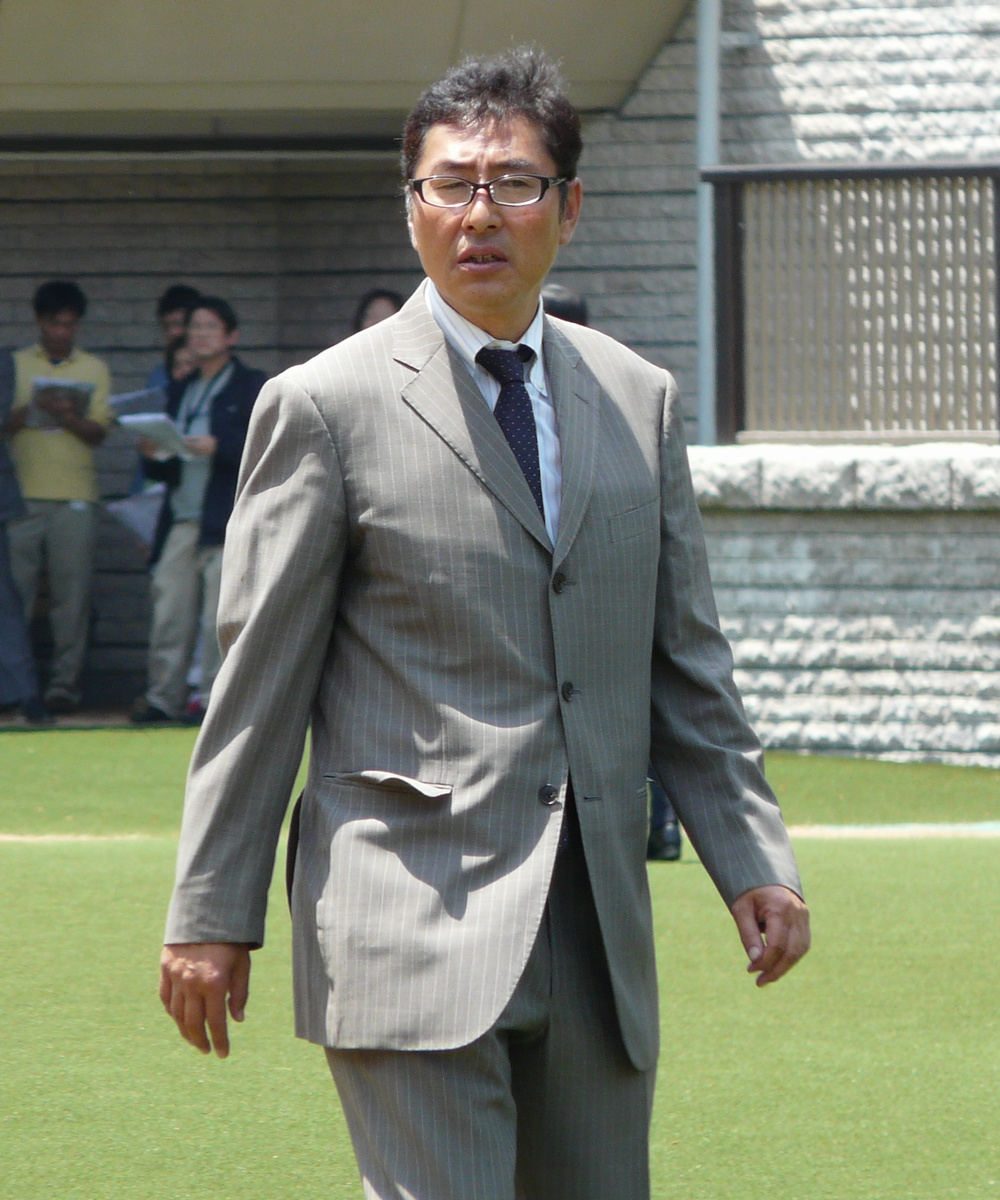
Danon Kingly's trainer Kiyoshi Hagiwara

Danon Kingly began his second season in the Grade 3 Tokinominoru Kinen (a trial race for the Satsuki Sho) over 1800 metres at Tokyo on 10 February. Starting the 3.2/1 third choice in the betting behind Admire Mars and Fossamagna, he raced in fourth place before overtaking the front-running favourite in the closing stages and winning by one and a quarter lengths. On 14 April the colt contested the 79th running of the Satsuki Sho over 2000 metres at Nakayama and started third favourite behind Saturnalia and Admire Mars. After settling in fourth place he struggled to obtain a clear run before producing a strong charge along the inside rail and finished third, beaten a head and a nose by Saturnalia and Velox in a three-way photo-finish. He was then stepped up in distance for the 86th edition of the Tokyo Yushun over 2400 metres at Tokyo 26 May. Starting the 3.7/1 third choice in the betting he raced on the inside in fifth place before making a sustained run in the straight but failed by a neck to overhaul the 92/1 outsider Roger Barows.

After a four-month summer break Danon Kingly returned to the track in the Grade 2 Mainichi Okan 1800 metres at Tokyo on 6 October in which he was matched against older horses for the first time. He started 0.6/1 favourite in a ten-runner field which included Aerolithe (2017 NHK Mile Cup), Indy Champ, Mozu Ascot and Keiai Nautique (2018 NHK Mile Cup). After racing in last place for most of the way Danon Kingly was switched to the outside in the straight and produced a sustained run to take the lead in the closing stages and win by a length and a quarter from Aerolithe with Indy Champ the same distance away in third. The colt was partnered by Norihiro Yokoyama when he ended his season in the Mile Championship over 1600 metres at Kyoto Racecourse on 17 November. He started second favourite but after tracking the leaders for most of the way he was unable to make any significant progress in the straight and came home fifth behind Indy Champ, Danon Premium, Persian Knight and My Style.

In the 2019 World's Best Racehorse Rankings Danon Kingly was given a rating of 118, making him the 78th best racehorse in the world.

=== 2020: four-year-old season ===
Danon Kingly began his third campaign in the Grade 2 Nakayama Kinen over 1800 metres at Nakayama on 1 March in which he was ridden by Norihiro Yokoyama and started 1.5/1 against eight opponents including Lucky Lilac, Win Bright, Indy Champ, Persian Knight and Soul Stirring. He settled in third place behind the front-running outsider Maltese Apogee before taking the lead in the straight and winning by one and three quarter lengths from Lucky Lilac. Five weeks later the colt started favourite for the Group 1 Osaka Hai over 2000 metres at Hanshin Racecourse. By this point horse racing in Japan was taking place behind closed doors owing to the COVID-19 pandemic. In a change of tactics, Yokoyama sent him into the lead from the start and Danon Kingly maintained his advantage until the last 100 metres when he was overtaken and beaten into third place by Lucky Lilac and Chrono Genesis. Keita Tosaki returned from injury to resume his partnership with the colt when Danon Kingly was dropped back in distance for the 1600 metre Yasuda Kinen at Tokyo on 7 June. He tracked the leaders before switching to the outside in the straight but was unable to quicken and came home seventh of the fourteen runners behind Gran Alegria.

Danon Kingly returned after an absence of almost five months to contest the autumn edition of the Tenno Sho over 2000 metres at Tokyo on 1 November. He started third choice in the betting but after racing in fifth place he faded in the last 400 metres and finished last of the twelve runners behind Almond Eye.

In the 2020 World's Best Racehorse Rankings, Danon Kingly was again given a rating of 118, making him the 80th best horse in the world.

=== 2021: five-year-old season ===
Danon Kingly did not reappear as a five-year-old until 6 June when he started a 47/1 outsider for the Yasuda Kinen. Gran Alegria started odds-on favourite while the other thirteen runners included Schnell Meister, Indy Champ, Salios, Lauda Sion and Danon Premium. Ridden for the first time by Yuga Kawada he raced in mid-division before making a sustained run down the centre of the straight. Danon Kingly gained the advantage from Indy Champ and Schnell Meister in the last 100 metres and held off the late challenge of Gran Alegria to win by a head. After the race Kawada said "He felt a bit tense first entering the track but he had good rhythm during the trip and had plenty of horse left. He responded just as I hoped turning the last corner and ran well after that. Although he hasn’t been able to put in the best results in the past, he has definitely demonstrated his true strength today and I’m happy to have been a part of it in my first time in the saddle."

He traveled to Hong Kong to compete in the Hong Kong Mile on December 12, where he finished in 8th place behind Golden Sixty. He returned to Japan from Hong Kong on December 14, and was removed from the racing horse registration on December 22.

== Racing statistics ==
The following content is based on information from netkeiba.com and the Hong Kong Jockey Club.

| Date | Track | Name | Grade | Distance (Condition) | Entry | HN | Odds (Favored) | Finish | Time | Margins | Jockey | Winner (2nd Place) |
|---|---|---|---|---|---|---|---|---|---|---|---|---|
2019 – two-year-old season
| Oct 8 | Tokyo | 2YO Debut Race | | 1600m (firm) | 18 | 17 | 5.4 (2nd) | 1st | 1:37.5 | 0.0 | Keita Tosaki | (Curren Bouquetd'or) |
| Dec 15 | Nakayama | Hiiragi Sho | ALW (1-win) | 1600m (firm) | 15 | 15 | 4.6 (2nd) | 1st | 1:33.7 | –0.6 | Keita Tosaki | (Mythologie) |
2019 – three-year-old season
| Feb 10 | Tokyo | Kyodo Tsushin Hai | GIII | 1800m (firm) | 7 | 1 | 4.2 (3rd) | 1st | 1:46.8 | –0.2 | Keita Tosaki | (Admire Mars) |
| Apr 14 | Nakayama | Satsuki Sho | GI | 2000m (firm) | 18 | 4 | 5.8 (3rd) | 3rd | 1:58.1 | 0.0 | Keita Tosaki | Saturnalia |
| May 26 | Tokyo | Tokyo Yushun | GI | 2400m (firm) | 18 | 7 | 4.7 (3rd) | 2nd | 2:22.6 | 0.0 | Keita Tosaki | Roger Barows |
| Oct 6 | Tokyo | Mainichi Ōkan | GII | 1800m (firm) | 10 | 9 | 1.6 (1st) | 1st | 1:44.4 | –0.2 | Keita Tosaki | (Aerolithe) |
| Nov 17 | Kyoto | Mile Championship | GI | 1600m (firm) | 17 | 1 | 3.9 (2nd) | 5th | 1:33.4 | 0.4 | Norihiro Yokoyama | Indy Champ |
2020 – four-year-old season
| Mar 1 | Nakayama | Nakayama Kinen | GII | 1800m (firm) | 9 | 3 | 2.5 (1st) | 1st | 1:46.3 | –0.3 | Norihiro Yokoyama | (Lucky Lilac) |
| Apr 5 | Hanshin | Osaka Hai | GI | 2000m (firm) | 12 | 8 | 3.8 (1st) | 3rd | 1:58.5 | 0.1 | Norihiro Yokoyama | Lucky Lilac |
| Jun 7 | Tokyo | Yasuda Kinen | GI | 1600m (good) | 14 | 2 | 12.9 (5th) | 7th | 1:32.4 | 0.8 | Keita Tosaki | Gran Alegria |
| Nov 1 | Tokyo | Tenno Sho (Autumn) | GI | 2000m (firm) | 12 | 4 | 13.3 (3rd) | 12th | 2:00.7 | 2.9 | Keita Tosaki | Almond Eye |
2021 – five-year-old season
| Jun 6 | Tokyo | Yasuda Kinen | GI | 1600m (firm) | 14 | 11 | 47.6 (8th) | 1st | 1:31.7 | 0.0 | Yuga Kawada | (Gran Alegria) |
| Oct 10 | Tokyo | Mainichi Ōkan | GII | 1800m (firm) | 13 | 7 | 2.7 (2nd) | 2nd | 1:44.8 | 0.0 | Yuga Kawada | Schnell Meister |
| Dec 12 | Sha Tin | Hong Kong Mile | GI | 1600m (firm) | 11 | 2 | 8.6 (2nd) | 8th | 1:34.37 | 0.51 | Yuga Kawada | Golden Sixty |

- Odds and favorites in Hong Kong are from the Hong Kong Jockey Club.

== Stallion performance ==
Since 2022, Danon Kingly is standing stud at Shadai Stallion Station in Abira, Hokkaido. His service fee as of 2025 is 1,500,000JPY.

== Pedigree ==
Pedigree of Danon Kingly (JPN), bay horse 2016
| Sire Deep Impact (JPN) 2002 | Sunday Silence (USA); 1986 | Halo | Hail to Reason |
| Sire Deep Impact (JPN) 2002 | Sunday Silence (USA); 1986 | Halo | Cosmah |
| Sire Deep Impact (JPN) 2002 | Sunday Silence (USA); 1986 | Wishing Well | Understanding |
| Sire Deep Impact (JPN) 2002 | Sunday Silence (USA); 1986 | Wishing Well | Mountain Flower |
| Sire Deep Impact (JPN) 2002 | Wind in Her Hair (IRE); 1991 | Alzao (USA) | Lyphard |
| Sire Deep Impact (JPN) 2002 | Wind in Her Hair (IRE); 1991 | Alzao (USA) | Lady Rebecca (GB) |
| Sire Deep Impact (JPN) 2002 | Wind in Her Hair (IRE); 1991 | Burghclere (GB) | Busted |
| Sire Deep Impact (JPN) 2002 | Wind in Her Hair (IRE); 1991 | Burghclere (GB) | Highclere |
| Dam My Goodness (USA) 2005 | Storm Cat (USA); 1983 | Storm Bird (CAN) | Northern Dancer |
| Dam My Goodness (USA) 2005 | Storm Cat (USA); 1983 | Storm Bird (CAN) | South Ocean |
| Dam My Goodness (USA) 2005 | Storm Cat (USA); 1983 | Terlingua | Secretariat |
| Dam My Goodness (USA) 2005 | Storm Cat (USA); 1983 | Terlingua | Crimson Saint |
| Dam My Goodness (USA) 2005 | Caressing (USA); 1998 | Honour and Glory | Relaunch |
| Dam My Goodness (USA) 2005 | Caressing (USA); 1998 | Honour and Glory | Fair To All |
| Dam My Goodness (USA) 2005 | Caressing (USA); 1998 | Lovin Touch | Majestic Prince |
| Dam My Goodness (USA) 2005 | Caressing (USA); 1998 | Lovin Touch | Forest Princess (Family: 9-f) |

- Her dam, Caressing, was the winner of the 2000 Breeder's Cup Juvenile Fillies and the 2000 Eclipse Award for Champion Two-Year-Old Filly.
- His half-brothers are Danon Legend (sire Macho Uno), winner of the 2016 JBC Sprint, and Danon Good (sire Elusive Quality), who has won six races in the central circuit and nine major races in the local circuit and is now a sire. His close relative is West Coast, winner of the 2017 Eclipse Award for Best Three-Year-Old Colt.
