= Indy Champ =

Japanese Thoroughbred racehorse

Indy Champ; インディチャンプ
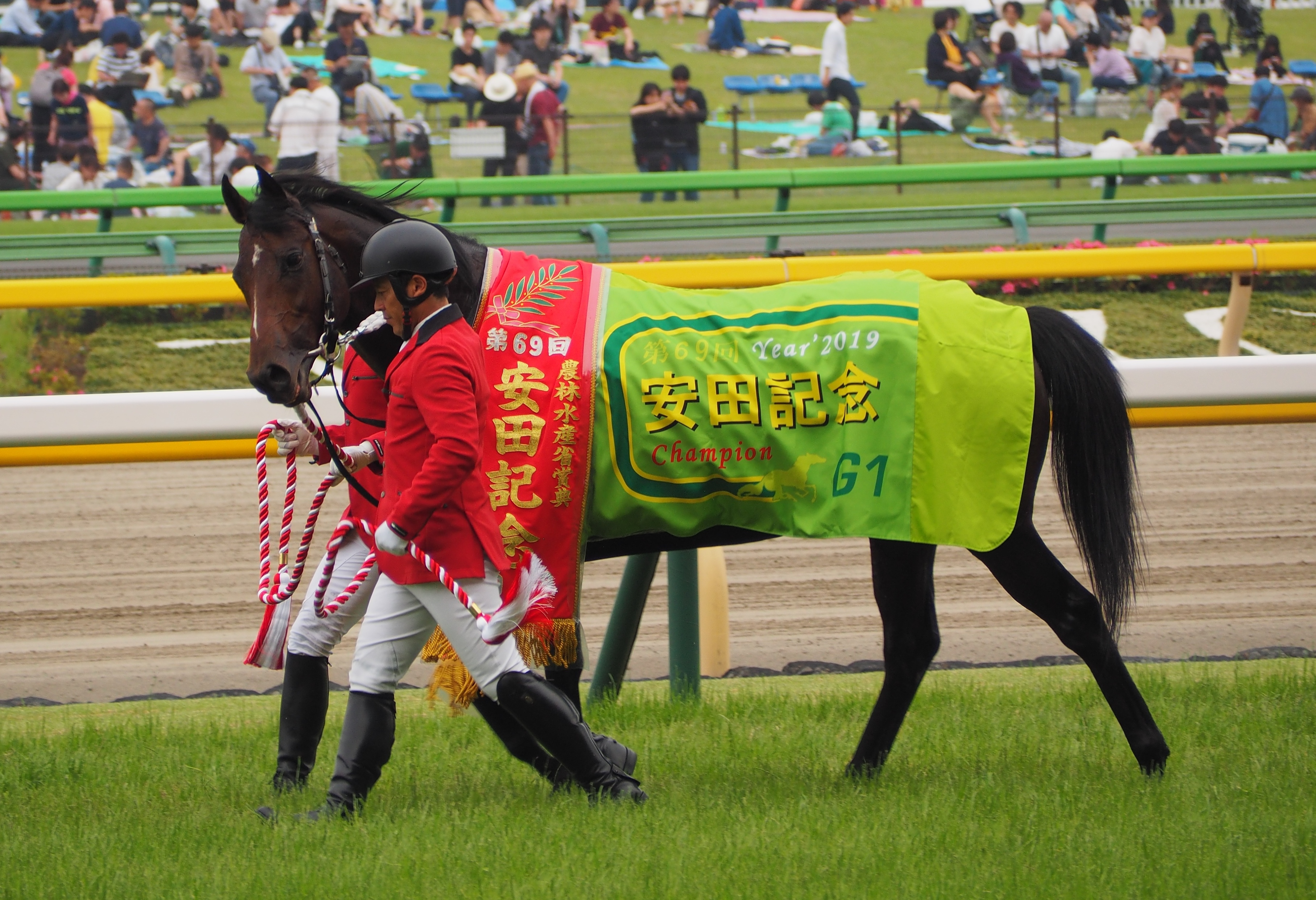
- Indy Champ after winning the Yasuda Kinen
- Sire: Stay Gold
- Grandsire: Sunday Silence
- Dam: Will Power
- Damsire: King Kamehameha
- Sex: Colt
- Foaled: 21 February 2015
- Country: Japan
- Colour: Bay or Brown
- Breeder: Northern Farm
- Owner: Silk Racing
- Racing colours
- Trainer: Hidetaka Otonashi
- Jockey: Yuichi Fukunaga
- Record: 23: 8-2-5
- Earnings: ¥615,040,000

Major wins
- Tokyo Shimbun Hai (2019); Yasuda Kinen (2019); Mile Championship (2019); Yomiuri Milers Cup (2020)

Awards
- JRA Award for Best Sprinter or Miler (2019)

Indy Champ (Japanese: インディチャンプ, foaled 21 February 2015) is a former Japanese Thoroughbred racehorse. After winning his only start as a juvenile in 2017, he showed good form in the following year when he won three races and finished third in the Mainichi Hai. He emerged as a top-class performer in 2019, winning the Tokyo Shimbun Hai in February and going to take both of Japan's open age Grade 1 mile races, the Yasuda Kinen and the Mile Championship. In the following years, he won the Yomiuri Milers Cup and was placed in both the Yasuda Kinen and the Mile Championship.

== Background ==
Indy Champ is a dark bay horse with a white star and stripe bred in Japan by the Northern Farm. During his racing career he was trained by Hidetaka Otonashi and raced in the blue and red colours of the Northern Farm affiliate Silk Racing.

He was from the twelfth crop of foals sired by Stay Gold, a horse whose wins included the Dubai Sheema Classic and Hong Kong Vase in 2001. He went on to sire many major winners including Orfevre, Gold Ship, Nakayama Festa, Rainbow Line and Fenomeno. Indy Champ's dam Will Power who won four minor races in five seasons on the track between 2009 and 2013 was a half-sister to several winners including Real Impact (Yasuda Kinen, George Ryder Stakes) and Neorealism (Queen Elizabeth II Cup).

== Racing career ==
=== 2017: two-year-old season ===
On 28 December 2017 at Hanshin Racecourse Indy Champ made his racecourse debut in a 1400-metre event for previously unraced juveniles and won narrowly from Amore Jody and twelve others.

=== 2018: three-year-old season ===
Indy Champ made a successful start to his second season when he won a minor race over 1600 metres at Kyoto Racecourse on 13 January. He was then stepped up in class and distance for the Grade 3 Mainichi Hai over 1800 metres at Hanshin in March when he started at odds of 3.1/1. He then finished third of the ten runners, two and a quarter lengths behind the winner Blast Onepiece. In April at the same track he was beaten just over a length when he came home fourth behind Tower of London in the Grade 3 Arlington Cup. Indy Champ was dropped back in class in June and finished second to the filly A Shin Twinkle in a minor race over 1600 metres at Hanshin. At Chukyo Racecourse on 14 July he started favourite for a race over 1600 metres and won from the four-year-old Clear The Track. After a break of more than five months Indy Champ returned to the track on 16 December and won the Motomachi Stakes over 1600 metres at Hanshin.

=== 2019: four-year-old season ===
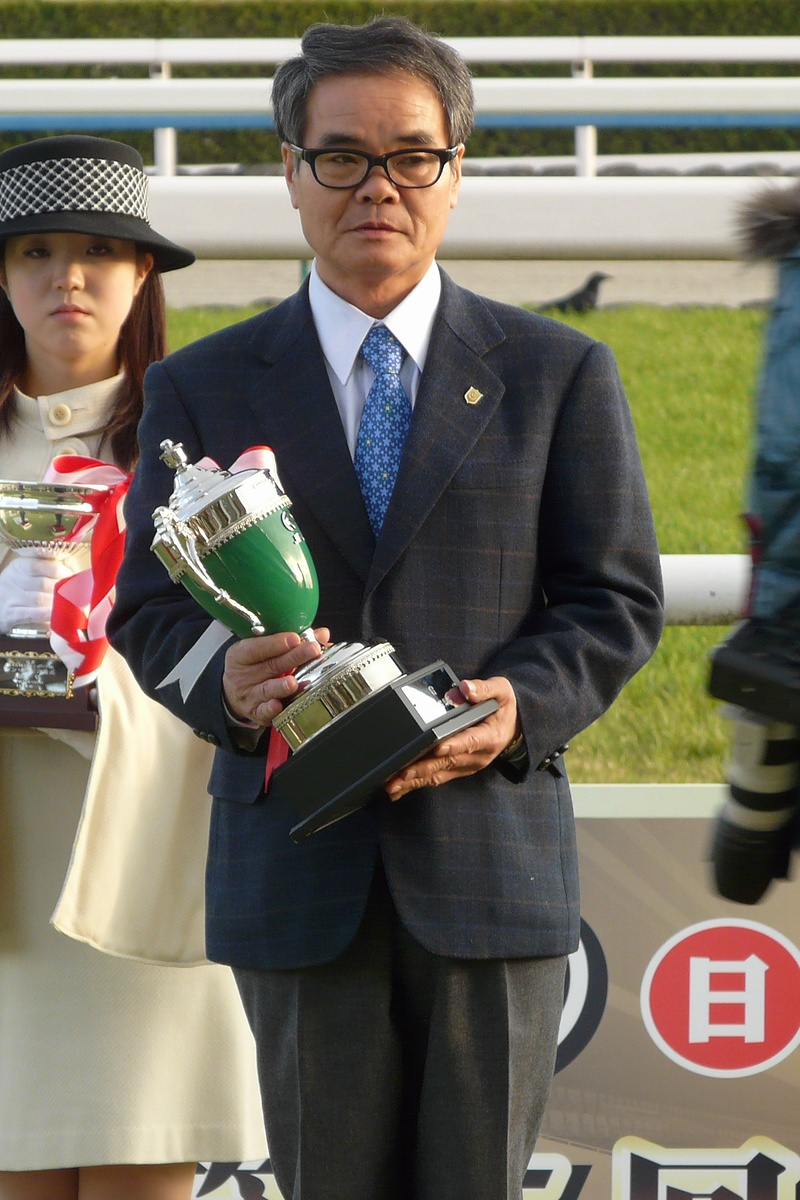
Indy Champ's trainer Hidetaka Otonashi

On his first run as a four-year-old Indy Champ started the 1.7/1 favourite in a fifteen-runner field for the Grade 3 Tokyo Shimbun Hai over 1600 metres at Tokyo Racecourse on 3 February. Ridden by Yuichi Fukunaga he raced on the inside rail and turned into the straight in sixth place before taking the lead 200 metres from the finish. He opened up a clear advantage before holding off the late challenges of Red Olga and Satono Ares to win by half a length and a head. On his next appearance he came home fourth behind Danon Premium in the Yomiuri Milers Cup at Kyoto on 21 April after he failed to settle in a slowly-run race.

In the 69th edition of the Yasuda Kinen over 1600 metres at Tokyo on 2 June, Indy Champ was partnered by Fukunaga and went off at odds of 18.2/1 in a sixteen-runner field. Almond Eye started the odds-on favourite while the other contenders included Danon Premium, Aerolithe (Mainichi Okan), Persian Knight (2017 Mile Championship), Mozu Ascot (winner of the race in 2018), Keiai Nautique (NHK Mile Cup) and Stelvio (2018 Mile Championship). After racing in fifth place as Aerolithe set the pace Indy Champ threaded his way through the field in the straight, took the lead in the final strides and won by a neck, with the fast-finishing Almond Eye a nose away in third. Fukunaga commented "He was tuned up well, was in great shape, and had a good draw, so I just tried hard not to miss our break. He tends to get distracted when he's up front so I kept him off the pace. We were up against fierce competition, but I believed that he had a good chance as long as I didn’t make any mistakes and he certainly responded beautifully to our expectations".

After a break of four months Indy Champ returned in the Mainichi Okan over 1800 metres at Tokyo on 6 October in which he raced in second place for most of the way before finishing third behind Danon Kingly and Aerolithe. On 17 November he was one of seventeen horses to contest the 36th running of the Mile Championship in Kyoto and with Kenichi Ikezoe in the saddle he started the 5.4/1 third choice in the betting behind Danon Premium and Danon Kingly.The other runners included Al Ain, Mozu Ascot, Red Olga, Persian Knight and Diatonic (Swan Stakes). Ikezoe tucked Indy Champ in behind the leaders in fourth place on the inside before making a forward move exiting the final turn. He went to the front 150 metres from the finish, broke clear of his rivals and won by one and a half lengths from Danon Premium. Ikezoe, who took the ride at short notice when Fukunaga was suspended, said "I was told that he is a bit unstable at the start but he broke well and we were able to race in good position while eyeing Danon Premium. He responded really well when asked at the lane".

For his final run of the year Indy Champ was sent to Sha Tin Racecourse to contest the Hong Kong Mile on 8 December and started joint-favourite alongside the local champion Beauty Generation. Ridden by Damian Lane he struggled to obtain a clear run in the last 400 metres and although he kept on well he was unable to reach the leaders and came home seventh of the ten runners behind Admire Mars.

In January 2020, at the JRA Awards for 2019, Indy Champ was voted Best Sprinter or Miler taking 211 of the 274 votes. He also finished second to fellow Stay Gold progeny Win Bright in the poll to determine Best Older Male Horse, receiving 118 votes to the winner's 136.

=== 2020: five-year-old season ===
Indy Champ was ridden by Yuichi Fukunaga in all of his races as a five-year-old. He began his fourth campaign on 1 March at Nakayama Racecourse when he raced over 1800 metres and came home fourth behind Danon Kingly, Lucky Lilac and Soul Stirring in the Grade 2 Nakayama Kinen. On 26 April he ran for the second time in the Yomiuri Milers Cup and started the 0.6/1 favourite in an eleven-runner field. He settled in third place as Lance of Puraana set the pace from Besten Dank before moving up on the outside to take the lead 200 metres from the finish and winning easily by two lengths. Fukunaga later commented "I thought he really shouldn't lose and the small field made reading the race easy... He has a lot of quirks but that was part of the attraction. I had the impression from before being asked to ride him that he was a difficult horse and that he had difficulties at the break. Now, a lot of that has been fixed." On 7 June at Tokyo the horse attempted to repeat his 2019 success in the Yasuda Kinen and started the 6/1 second favourite behind Almond Eye. He raced in mid-division before angling to the outside to make rapid progress in the straight but after moving into second place behind Gran Alegria he couldn't make any impact on the leader and lost second place to Almond Eye in the final strides.

Indy Champ was expected to resume his season in the Sprinters Stakes over 1200 metres at Nakayama in October but bypassed the race after experiencing "pain in his right hindquarters". After being off the track for five and a half months the horse attempted to defend his Mile Championship title at Hanshin on 22 November and went off the 7.8/1 third choice in the betting behind Gran Alegria and Salios. He settled in seventh place before moving up on the outside and gaining the advantage from Admire Mars 200 metres out, but was caught by Gran Alegria in the closing stages and beaten three-quarters of a length into second place. On 26 December Indy Champ ended his campaign in the Grade 2 Hanshin Cup over 1400 metres in which he started the 0.5/1 favourite but despite producing a strong late run from the rear of the sixteen-runner field he came home third behind the fillies Danon Fantasy and Maltese Diosa.

In the 2020 World's Best Racehorse Rankings, Indy Champ was rated on 119, making him the equal 57th best racehorse in the world.

=== 2021: six-year-old season ===
Indy Champ started the season with the Hankyu Hai, where he finished in fourth place behind Resistencia for 0.4 seconds. Indy Champ would then enter the Takamatsunomiya Kinen, his first 1200 meter race, in which he came in third behind Danon Smash, and the Yasuda Kinen where the horse came fourth place behind Danon Kingly. Indy Champ would then take a five and a half months long break before coming back to race in the Mile Championship but came in fourth place behind Gran Alegria, who would be retiring after this race. Indy Champ would follow suit in his next race, the Hong Kong Mile.

At the Hong Kong Mile, Indy Champ was originally scheduled to be ridden by Fukunaga, but as he suffered major injuries following an accident at the prior Hong Kong Sprint with Pixie Knight, Christophe Soumillon rode him as his replacement. Indy Champ would go on to place himself in 5th place behind Golden Sixty at the race itself.

== Racing form ==
Indy Champ won eight races and placed in six out of 23 starts. This data is based on JBIS, netkeiba and HKJC.

| Date | Track | Race | Grade | Distance (Condition) | Entry | HN | Odds (Favored) | Finish | Time | Margins | Jockey | Winner (Runner-up) |
|---|---|---|---|---|---|---|---|---|---|---|---|---|
2017 – two-year-old season
| Dec 28 | Hanshin | 2yo Newcomer | | 1,400 m (Firm) | 14 | 14 | 1.5 (1) | 1st | 1:23.2 | 0.0 | Fuuma Matsuwaka | (Amore Jody) |
2018 – three-year-old season
| Jan 13 | Kyoto | 3yo Allowance | 1W | 1,600 m (Firm) | 10 | 2 | 2.9 (2) | 1st | 1:37.2 | –0.2 | Yasunari Iwata | (Red Sakuya) |
| Mar 24 | Hanshin | Mainichi Hai | 3 | 1,800 m (Firm) | 10 | 3 | 5.1 (3) | 3rd | 1:46.8 | 0.3 | Yasunari Iwata | Blast Onepiece |
| Apr 4 | Hanshin | Arlington Cup | 3 | 1,600 m (Firm) | 13 | 2 | 3.5 (2) | 4th | 1:33.6 | 0.2 | Yasunari Iwata | Tower of London |
| Jun 16 | Hanshin | Shodoshima Tokubetsu | ALW (2W) | 1,600 m (Firm) | 9 | 8 | 1.9 (1) | 2nd | 1:32.0 | 0.0 | Yuichi Fukunaga | A Shin Twinkle |
| Jul 8 | Chukyo | Arimatsu Tokubetsu | ALW (2W) | 1,600 m (Good) | 13 | 1 | 1.5 (1) | 1st | 1:34.2 | –0.3 | Yuichi Fukunaga | (Clear the Track) |
| Dec 16 | Hanshin | Motomachi Stakes | ALW (3W) | 1,600 m (Firm) | 11 | 3 | 1.8 (1) | 1st | 1:34.6 | –0.5 | Yuichi Fukunaga | (Mesarthim) |
2019 – four-year-old season
| Feb 3 | Tokyo | Tokyo Shimbun Hai | 3 | 1,600 m (Firm) | 15 | 2 | 2.7 (1) | 1st | 1:31.9 | –0.1 | Yuichi Fukunaga | (Red Olga) |
| Apr 21 | Kyoto | Yomiuri Milers Cup | 2 | 1,600 m (Firm) | 10 | 3 | 4.7 (2) | 4th | 1:32.8 | 0.2 | Yuichi Fukunaga | Danon Premium |
| Jun 2 | Tokyo | Yasuda Kinen | 1 | 1,600 m (Firm) | 16 | 5 | 19.2 (4) | 1st | 1:30.9 | 0.0 | Yuichi Fukunaga | (Aerolithe) |
| Oct 6 | Tokyo | Mainichi Okan | 2 | 1,800 m (Firm) | 10 | 4 | 5.0 (3) | 3rd | 1:44.8 | 0.4 | Yuichi Fukunaga | Danon Kingly |
| Nov 17 | Kyoto | Mile Championship | 1 | 1,600 m (Firm) | 17 | 5 | 6.4 (3) | 1st | 1:33.0 | –0.2 | Kenichi Ikezoe | (Danon Premium) |
| Dec 8 | Sha Tin | Hong Kong Mile | 1 | 1,600 m (Firm) | 10 | 2 | 2.9 (2) | 7th | 1:33.8 | 0.5 | Damian Lane | Admire Mars |
2020 – five-year-old season
| Mar 1 | Nakayama | Nakayama Kinen | 2 | 1,800 m (Firm) | 9 | 1 | 5.4 (4) | 4th | 1:46.7 | 0.4 | Yuichi Fukunaga | Danon Kingly |
| Apr 26 | Kyoto | Yomiuri Milers Cup | 2 | 1,600 m (Firm) | 11 | 1 | 1.6 (1) | 1st | 1:32.4 | –0.3 | Yuichi Fukunaga | (Besten Dank) |
| Jun 7 | Tokyo | Yasuda Kinen | 1 | 1,600 m (Good) | 14 | 6 | 7.0 (2) | 3rd | 1:32.1 | 0.5 | Yuichi Fukunaga | Gran Alegria |
| Nov 22 | Hanshin | Mile Championship | 1 | 1,600 m (Firm) | 17 | 8 | 8.8 (3) | 2nd | 1:32.1 | 0.1 | Yuichi Fukunaga | Gran Alegria |
| Dec 26 | Hanshin | Hanshin Cup | 2 | 1,400 m (Firm) | 16 | 12 | 1.5 (1) | 3rd | 1:20.1 | 0.4 | Yuichi Fukunaga | Danon Fantasy |
2021 – six-year-old season
| Feb 28 | Hanshin | Hankyu Hai | 3 | 1,400 m (Firm) | 17 | 10 | 3.5 (3) | 4th | 1:19.6 | 0.4 | Yuichi Fukunaga | Resistencia |
| Mar 28 | Chukyo | Takamatsunomiya Kinen | 1 | 1,200 m (Soft) | 18 | 9 | 6.3 (3) | 3rd | 1:09.3 | 0.1 | Yuichi Fukunaga | Danon Smash |
| Jun 6 | Tokyo | Yasuda Kinen | 1 | 1,600 m (Firm) | 14 | 8 | 6.3 (2) | 4th | 1:31.9 | 0.2 | Yuichi Fukunaga | Danon Kingly |
| Nov 21 | Hanshin | Mile Championship | 1 | 1,600 m (Firm) | 16 | 7 | 16.7 (6) | 4th | 1:32.8 | 0.2 | Yuichi Fukunaga | Gran Alegria |
| Dec 12 | Sha Tin | Hong Kong Mile | 1 | 1,600 m (Firm) | 11 | 3 | 8.9 (4) | 5th | 1:34.3 | 0.4 | Christophe Soumillon | Golden Sixty |

Legend:
Turf

== Stud career ==
Following his return from Hong Kong, Indy Champ was deregistered from the JRA, and is standing stud at the Yushun Stallion Station. In 2026, he sired his first graded stakes winner, Taisei Vogue, after winning the Tulip Sho.

=== Notable progeny ===
Below data is based on JBIS Stallion Reports.

c = colt, f = filly

| Foaled | Name | Sex | Major Wins |
| 2023 | Taisei Vogue | f | Tulip Sho |
| 2024 | Lotschberg | c | Niigata Nisai Stakes |

== Pedigree ==
Pedigree of Indy Champ (JPN), bay stallion, 2015
| Sire Stay Gold (JPN) 1994 | Sunday Silence (USA); 1986 | Halo | Hail To Reason |
| Sire Stay Gold (JPN) 1994 | Sunday Silence (USA); 1986 | Halo | Cosmah |
| Sire Stay Gold (JPN) 1994 | Sunday Silence (USA); 1986 | Wishing Well | Understanding |
| Sire Stay Gold (JPN) 1994 | Sunday Silence (USA); 1986 | Wishing Well | Mountain Flower |
| Sire Stay Gold (JPN) 1994 | Golden Sash (JPN); 1988 | Dictus (FR) | Sanctus |
| Sire Stay Gold (JPN) 1994 | Golden Sash (JPN); 1988 | Dictus (FR) | Doronic |
| Sire Stay Gold (JPN) 1994 | Golden Sash (JPN); 1988 | Dyna Sash | Northern Taste (CAN) |
| Sire Stay Gold (JPN) 1994 | Golden Sash (JPN); 1988 | Dyna Sash | Royal Sash (GB) |
| Dam Will Power (JPN) 2007 | King Kamehameha (JPN); 2001 | Kingmambo (USA) | Mr. Prospector |
| Dam Will Power (JPN) 2007 | King Kamehameha (JPN); 2001 | Kingmambo (USA) | Miesque |
| Dam Will Power (JPN) 2007 | King Kamehameha (JPN); 2001 | Manfath (IRE) | Last Tycoon |
| Dam Will Power (JPN) 2007 | King Kamehameha (JPN); 2001 | Manfath (IRE) | Pilot Bird (GB) |
| Dam Will Power (JPN) 2007 | Tokio Reality (USA); 1994 | Meadowlake | Hold Your Peace |
| Dam Will Power (JPN) 2007 | Tokio Reality (USA); 1994 | Meadowlake | Suspicious Native |
| Dam Will Power (JPN) 2007 | Tokio Reality (USA); 1994 | What A Reality | In Reality |
| Dam Will Power (JPN) 2007 | Tokio Reality (USA); 1994 | What A Reality | What Will Be (Family: 3-l) |
