= Danon Premium =

Japanese-bred Thoroughbred racehorse

Danon Premium; ダノンプレミアム
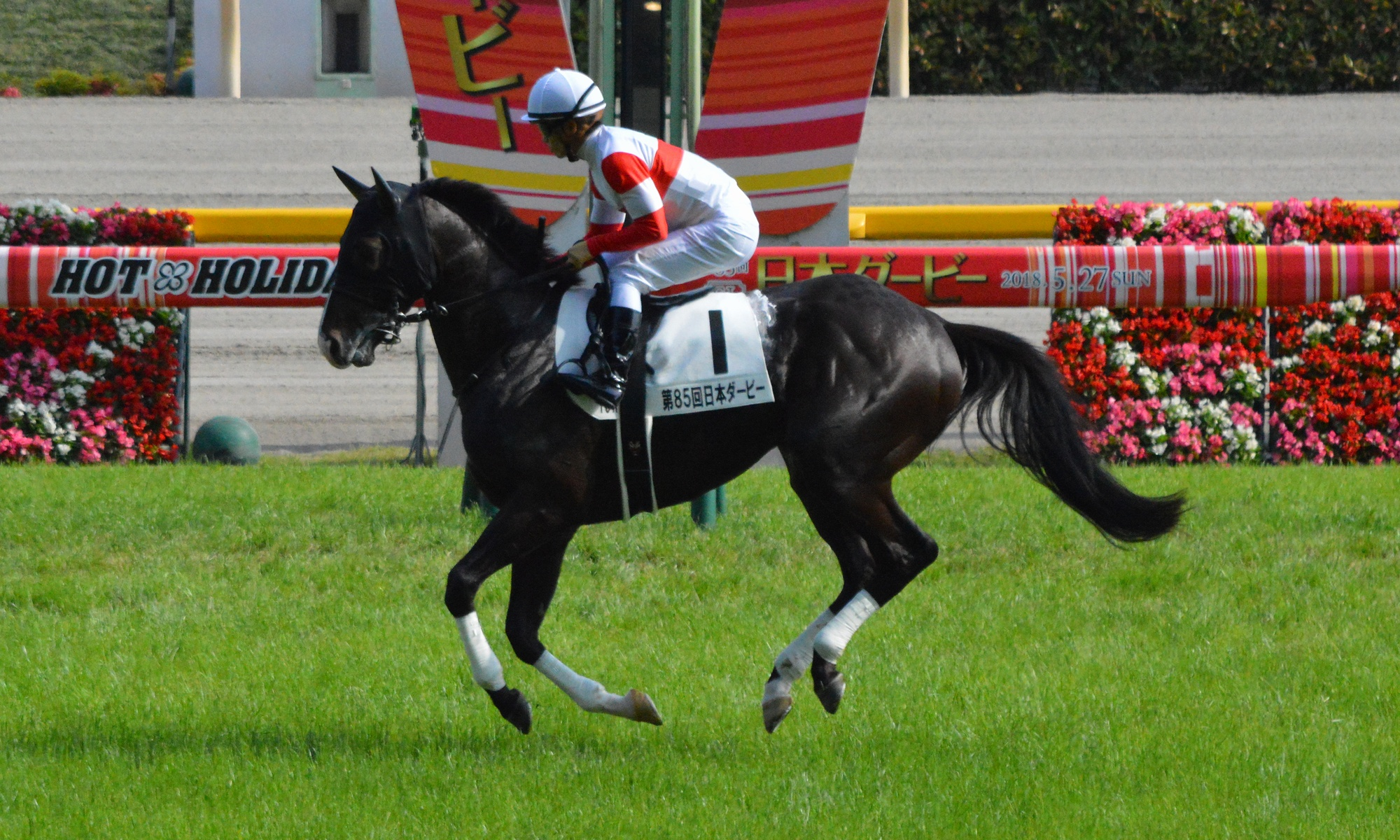
- Danon Premium at Tokyo Racehorse
- Sire: Deep Impact
- Grandsire: Sunday Silence
- Dam: Indiana Gal
- Damsire: Intikhab
- Sex: Stallion
- Foaled: 3 April 2015
- Country: Japan
- Colour: Black or Brown
- Breeder: K I Farm
- Owner: Danox Co Ltd
- Racing colours
- Trainer: Mitsumasa Nakauchida
- Jockey: Yuga Kawada
- Record: 15: 6-2-1
- Earnings: Japan: ¥418,129,000; Overseas: AUD195,000

Major wins
- Saudi Arabia Royal Cup (2017); Asahi Hai Futurity Stakes (2017); Yayoi Sho (2018); Kinko Sho (2019); Yomiuri Milers Cup (2019)

Awards
- JRA Award for Best Two-Year-Old Colt (2017)

Danon Premium (Japanese: ダノンプレミアム, foaled 3 April 2015) is a Japanese retired Thoroughbred racehorse and breeding stallion. He was the top-rated juvenile in Japan in 2017 when he was undefeated in three races including the Saudi Arabia Royal Cup and the Asahi Hai Futurity Stakes. In the following year he won the Yayoi Sho but finished sixth when favourite for the Tokyo Yushun. As a four-year-old he won the Kinko Sho and Yomiuri Milers Cup as well as finishing second in both the Tenno Sho and the Mile Championship.

== Background ==
Danon Premium is a black or brown stallion with a white blaze, bred in Japan by K I Farm. During his track career he carried the colours of Danox Co Ltd the business software enterprise of his owner Masahiro Noda, and was trained by Mitsumasa Nakauchida. He has been ridden in most of his races by Yuga Kawada.

He was from the eighth crop of foals sired by Deep Impact, who was the Japanese Horse of the Year in 2005 and 2006, winning races including the Tokyo Yushun, Tenno Sho, Arima Kinen and Japan Cup. Deep Impact's other progeny include Gentildonna, Harp Star, Kizuna, A Shin Hikari, Marialite, Donan Kingly, and Saxon Warrior.

Danon Premium's dam Indiana Gal was a durable Irish mare who ran 34 times over four years on the track, winning the Salsabil Stakes and the Carlingford Stakes in 2009. Her great-grand-dam Ash Lawn was a half-sister to Royal Palace and closely related to Fairy Footsteps, Light Cavalry and Desert Prince.

== Racing career ==
=== 2017: two-year-old season ===
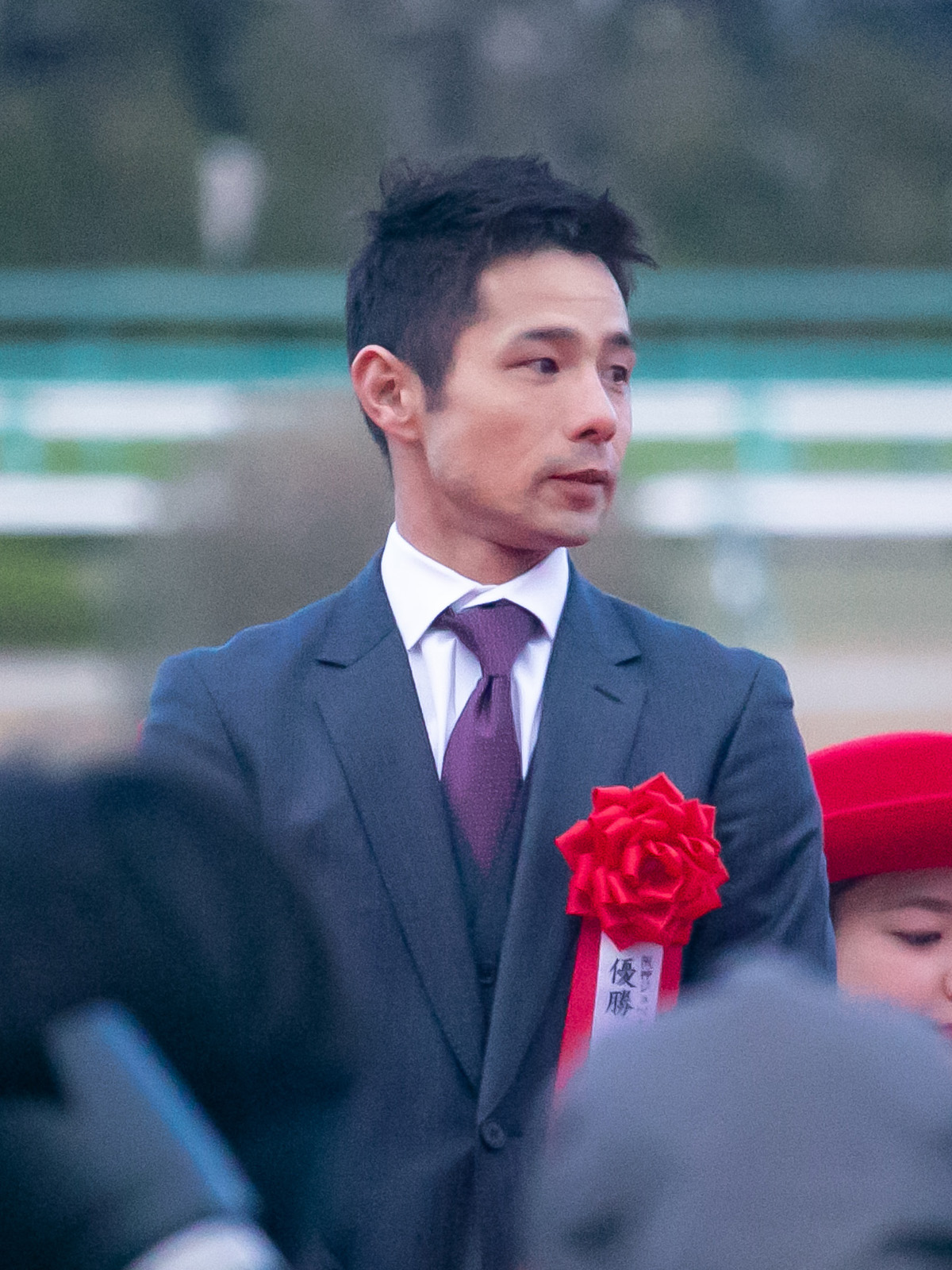
Danon Premium's trainer Mitsumasa Nakauchida

Danon Premium began his track career in a contest for previously unraced juveniles over 1800 metres at Hanshin Racecourse on 25 June and won by four lengths from Spring Smile and eight others. After a summer break, the colt returned to the track on 7 October when he was moved up in class for the Grade 3 Saudi Arabia Royal Cup over 1600 metres at Tokyo Racecourse. Starting the 2.6/1 second choice in an eighteen-runner field he won by one and three quarter lengths from the favourite Stelvio in a race record time of 1:33.0.

On 17 December Danon Premium started the 1.3/1 favourite for the Grade 1 Asahi Hai Futurity Stakes at Hanshin with the best fancied of his fifteen opponents being Tower of London (winner of the Keio Hai Nisai Stakes), Stelvio and Danon Smash. Danon Premium raced in third place before taking the lead early in the straight and recorded an emphatic victory as he came home three and a half lengths clear of his rivals, with Stelvio taking second ahead of Tower of London and Keiai Nautique. After the race Yuga Kawada said "He's a smart horse. He was a bit keen to go today but I believed in his strength and urged him to go when I saw a clear path entering the lane. He stretched and accelerated really well, just as we had expected. We need to extend the distance of his races in order for him to win the classics next year but I think he will continue to develop well toward this goal".

In the official ratings for Japanese two-year-olds Danon Premium was rated the best juvenile of the year ahead of Time Flyer (Hopeful Stakes) and Wagnerian. In January 2018 Danon Premium was named Best Two-Year-Old Colt at the JRA Awards for 2017 taking 275 of the 290 votes.

=== 2018: three-year-old season ===
On his three-year-old debut Danon Premium contested the Grade 3 Yayoi Sho (a major trial for the Satsuki Sho) over 2000 metres at Nakayama Racecourse on 4 March. Starting the 0.8/1 favourite in a ten-runner field he maintained his unbeaten record as he came home one and a half lengths in front of Blast Onepiece. The colt bypassed the Shuka Sho after sustaining an injury, described as a "stone bruise", to his right foreleg. He returned to the track for the Tokyo Yushun over 2400 metres on 27 May and started the 1.1/1 favourite against seventeen opponents. After tracking the leaders he began to make progress in the straight but was boxed in on the inside rail in the closing stages and finished sixth behind Wagnerian, Epoca d'Oro, Cosmic Force, Etario and Blast Onepiece. He did not race again in 2018.

=== 2019: four-year-old season ===
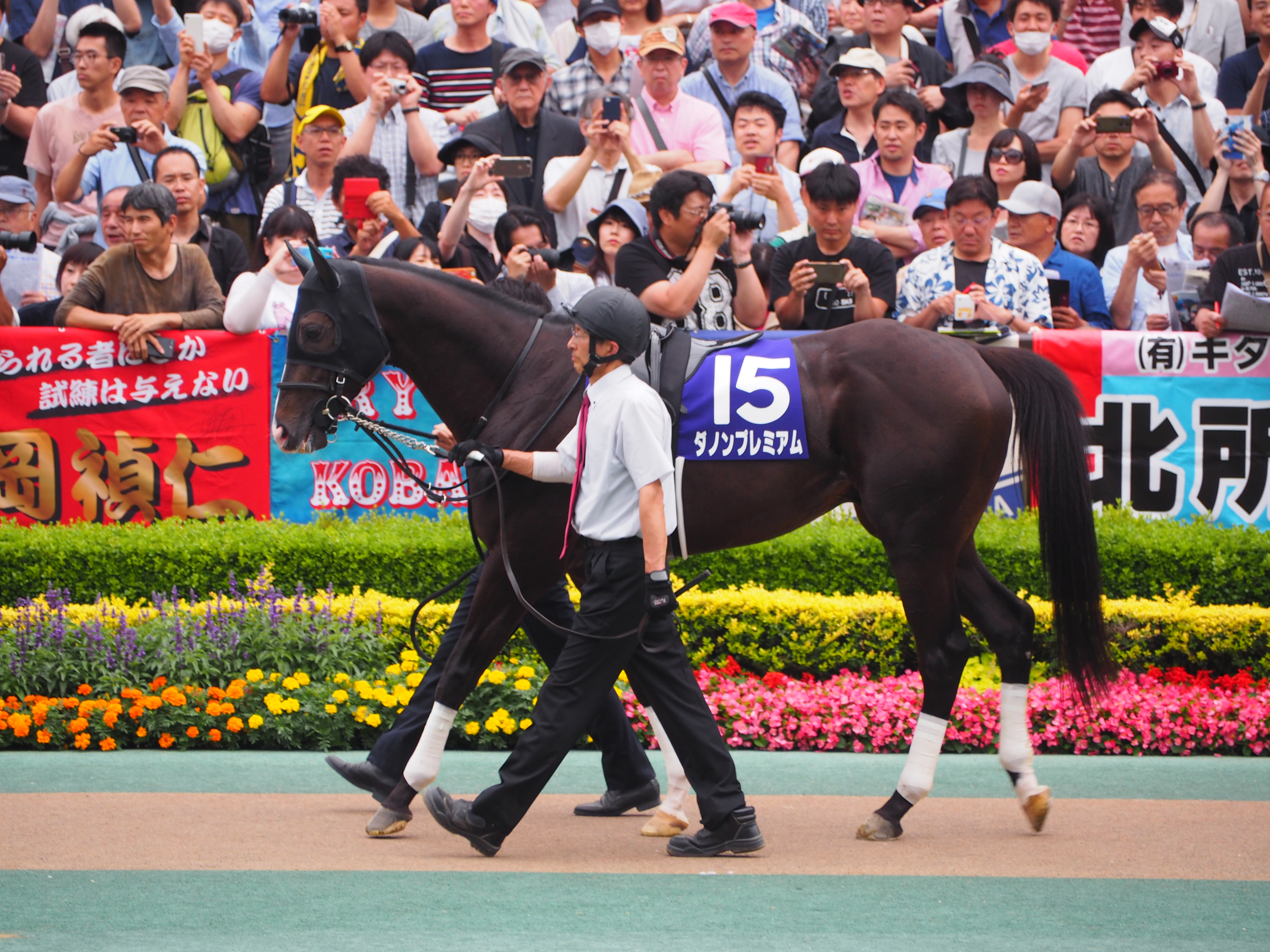
Danon Premium in 2019

After an absence of over nine months Danon Premium returned to the track on 10 March for the Grade 2 Kinko Sho over 2000 metres at Chukyo Racecourse and started second favourite behind Air Windsor in a thirteen-runner field which also included Lys Gracieux), Al Ain, Persian Knight (Mile Championship) and Mozu Katchan (Queen Elizabeth II Cup). He tracked the leaders before going to the front 200 metres out and won by one and a quarter lengths from Lys Gracieux. In April at Kyoto Racecourse the colt was dropped back in trip and started odds on favourite for the Yomiuri Milers Cup against nine opponents including Indy Champ, Mozu Ascot (Yasuda Kinen) and Keiai Nautique (NHK Mile Cup). Danon Premium raced in second place behind the front-running seven-year-old Guanciale before taking the lead in the straight and winning by one and a quarter lengths. Danon Premium was strongly fancied for the Yasuda Kinen at Tokyo on 2 June and started second favourite behind Almond Eye but trailed home last of the sixteen runners behind Indy Champ after being hampered soon after the start.

Danon Premium returned from his summer break to contest the autumn edition of the Tenno Sho over 2000 metres at Tokyo on 27 October and started the 8.5/1 third favourite. After racing in fifth for most of the way he proved no match for the easy winner Almond Eye but kept on well in the straight to take second place. On 17 November Danon Premium started favourite for the Mile Championship at Kyoto. He raced in fourth place behind the front-running My Style before taking the lead in the straight but was overtaken and beaten one and a half lengths into second place by Indy Champ.

=== 2020: five-year-old season ===
For his first run of 2020 Danon Premium was sent to Australia for the Queen Elizabeth Stakes on soft ground at Randwick Racecourse on 11 April in which he was ridden by the locally-based James McDonald and finished third behind Addeybb and Verry Elleegant. His assistant trainer Teruhiko Saruhashi later said "he wasn't bothered by the change in surroundings and he got to the race just fine, but the going was really bad and he was tired by the end". On his return to Japan he ran for the second time in the Yasuda Kinen and started third choice in the betting but as in 2019 he ran well below his best form and finished thirteenth of the fourteen runners in a race won by Gran Alegria. As in the previous year Danon Premium began his autumn campaign in the Tenno Sho which was run that year on 1 November. Starting a 20.6/1 outsider he led for most of the way before being overtaken in the closing stages and finishing fourth behind Almond Eye, Fierement and Chrono Genesis. Danon Premium ended his season with a trip to Hong Kong where he started the 4.6/1 fourth choice in the betting for the Hong Kong Cup over 2000 metres at Sha Tin Racecourse on 13 December. After tracking the front-running Time Warp he took the lead in the straight but was headed 100 metres from the finish and came home fourth behind Normcore, Win Bright and Magical beaten two lengths by the winner.

In the 2020 World's Best Racehorse Rankings, Danon Premium was rated on 119, making him the equal 57th best racehorse in the world.

=== 2021: six-year-old season ===
After spending six months at the K I Farm in Hidaka, Hokkaido, Danon Premium briefly returned to training for a final campaign. His only race of the year, however, saw him finish seventh behind his paternal half-brother Danon Kingly at that year's Yasuda Kinen. After the Yasuda Kinen, Danon Premium was subsequently retired from racing and is currently standing stud at the Arrow Stud with a service fee of 1,200,000JPY.

== Racing form ==
Danon Premium won six races and placed in three out of 15 starts. This data is available in JBIS, netkeiba, HKJC and racing.com.

| Date | Track | Race | Grade | Distance (Condition) | Entry | HN | Odds (Favored) | Finish | Time | Margins | Jockey | Winner (Runner-up) |
|---|---|---|---|---|---|---|---|---|---|---|---|---|
2017 – two-year-old season
| Jun 25 | Hanshin | 2yo Newcomer | | 1,800 m (Good) | 10 | 7 | 3.6 (1) | 1st | 1:48.7 | –0.7 | Yuga Kawada | (Spring Smile) |
| Oct 7 | Tokyo | Saudi Arabia Royal Cup | 3 | 1,600 m (Good) | 18 | 2 | 3.6 (2) | 1st | 1:33.0 | –0.3 | Yuga Kawada | (Stelvio) |
| Dec 17 | Hanshin | Asahi Hai Futurity Stakes | 1 | 1,600 m (Firm) | 16 | 1 | 2.3 (1) | 1st | 1:33.3 | –0.6 | Yuga Kawada | (Stelvio) |
2018 – three-year-old season
| Mar 4 | Nakayama | Yayoi Sho | 2 | 2,000 m (Firm) | 10 | 9 | 1.8 (1) | 1st | 2:01.0 | –0.2 | Yuga Kawada | (Wagnerian) |
| May 27 | Tokyo | Tokyo Yushun | 1 | 2,400 m (Firm) | 18 | 1 | 2.1 (1) | 6th | 2:23.8 | 0.2 | Yuga Kawada | Wagnerian |
2019 – four-year-old season
| Mar 10 | Chukyo | Kinko Sho | 2 | 2,000 m (Good) | 13 | 1 | 3.5 (2) | 1st | 2:00.1 | –0.2 | Yuga Kawada | (Lys Gracieux) |
| Apr 21 | Kyoto | Yomiuri Milers Cup | 2 | 1,600 m (Firm) | 10 | 6 | 1.3 (1) | 1st | 1:32.6 | –0.2 | Yuga Kawada | (Guanciale) |
| Jun 2 | Tokyo | Yasuda Kinen | 1 | 1,600 m (Firm) | 16 | 15 | 3.2 (2) | 16th | 1:32.9 | 2.0 | Yuga Kawada | Indy Champ |
| Oct 27 | Tokyo | Tenno Sho (Autumn) | 1 | 2,000 m (Firm) | 16 | 9 | 9.3 (3) | 2nd | 1:56.7 | 0.5 | Yuga Kawada | Almond Eye |
| Nov 17 | Kyoto | Mile Championship | 1 | 1,600 m (Firm) | 17 | 14 | 2.4 (1) | 2nd | 1:33.2 | 0.2 | Yuga Kawada | Indy Champ |
2020 – five-year-old season
| Apr 11 | Randwick | Queen Elizabeth Stakes | 1 | 2,000 m (Heavy) | 13 | 1 | 2.0 (1) | 3rd | 2:07.6 | 0.7 | James McDonald | Addeybb |
| Jun 7 | Tokyo | Yasuda Kinen | 1 | 1,600 m (Good) | 14 | 1 | 12.7 (4) | 13th | 1:33.6 | 2.0 | Damian Lane | Gran Alegria |
| Nov 1 | Tokyo | Tenno Sho (Autumn) | 1 | 2,000 m (Firm) | 12 | 11 | 21.6 (6) | 4th | 1:58.2 | 0.4 | Yuga Kawada | Almond Eye |
| Dec 13 | Sha Tin | Hong Kong Cup | 1 | 2,000 m (Firm) | 8 | 2 | 3.8 (2) | 4th | 2:00.8 | 0.3 | William Buick | Normcore |
2021 – six-year-old season
| Jun 6 | Tokyo | Yasuda Kinen | 1 | 1,600 m (Firm) | 14 | 6 | 19.2 (6) | 7th | 1:32.3 | 0.6 | Kenichi Ikezoe | Danon Kingly |

Legend:
Turf

== Stud career ==
Danon Premium became the stud at Arrow Stud in 2021.

=== Notable progeny ===
Below data is based on JBIS Stallion Reports.

c = colt, f = filly

| Foaled | Name | Sex | Major Wins |
| 2023 | Reservation | c | New Zealand Trophy |

== Pedigree ==
Pedigree of Danon Premium (JPN), black or brown colt 2015
| Sire Deep Impact (JPN) 2002 | Sunday Silence (USA); 1986 | Halo | Hail to Reason |
| Sire Deep Impact (JPN) 2002 | Sunday Silence (USA); 1986 | Halo | Cosmah |
| Sire Deep Impact (JPN) 2002 | Sunday Silence (USA); 1986 | Wishing Well | Understanding |
| Sire Deep Impact (JPN) 2002 | Sunday Silence (USA); 1986 | Wishing Well | Mountain Flower |
| Sire Deep Impact (JPN) 2002 | Wind in Her Hair (IRE); 1991 | Alzao (USA) | Lyphard |
| Sire Deep Impact (JPN) 2002 | Wind in Her Hair (IRE); 1991 | Alzao (USA) | Lady Rebecca (GB) |
| Sire Deep Impact (JPN) 2002 | Wind in Her Hair (IRE); 1991 | Burghclere (GB) | Busted |
| Sire Deep Impact (JPN) 2002 | Wind in Her Hair (IRE); 1991 | Burghclere (GB) | Highclere |
| Dam Indiana Gal (IRE) 2005 | Intikhab (USA); 1994 | Red Ransom | Roberto |
| Dam Indiana Gal (IRE) 2005 | Intikhab (USA); 1994 | Red Ransom | Arabia |
| Dam Indiana Gal (IRE) 2005 | Intikhab (USA); 1994 | Crafty Example | Crafty Prospector |
| Dam Indiana Gal (IRE) 2005 | Intikhab (USA); 1994 | Crafty Example | Zienelle |
| Dam Indiana Gal (IRE) 2005 | Genial Jenny; 1992 | Danehill (USA) | Danzig |
| Dam Indiana Gal (IRE) 2005 | Genial Jenny; 1992 | Danehill (USA) | Razyana |
| Dam Indiana Gal (IRE) 2005 | Genial Jenny; 1992 | Joma Kaanem | Double Form |
| Dam Indiana Gal (IRE) 2005 | Genial Jenny; 1992 | Joma Kaanem | Ash Lawn (FR) (Family: 1-s) |
