= Admire Mars =

Japanese Thoroughbred racehorse

Admire Mars アドマイヤマーズ
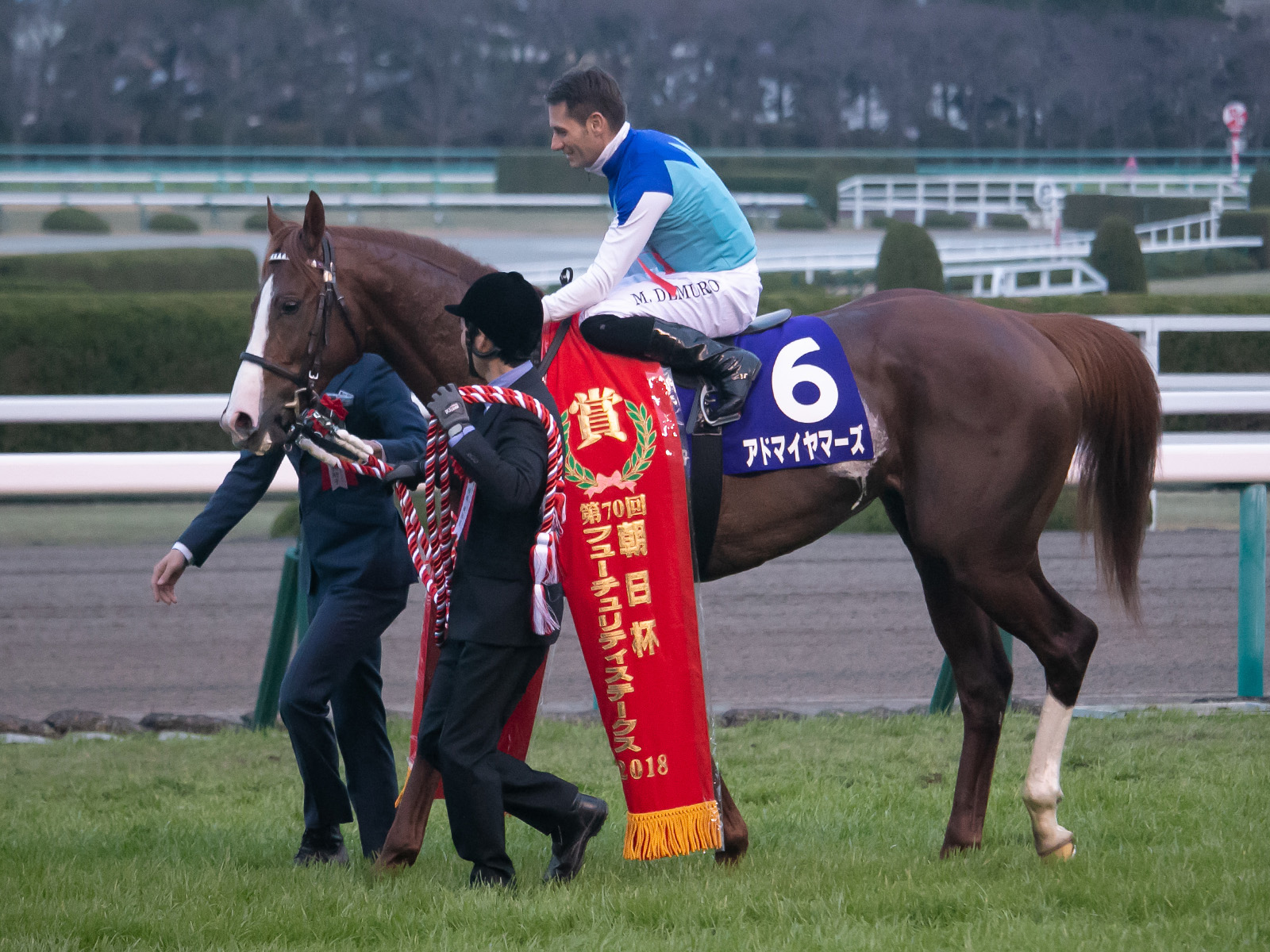
- Admire Mars in December 2018
- Sire: Daiwa Major
- Grandsire: Sunday Silence
- Dam: Via Medici
- Damsire: Medicean
- Sex: Stallion
- Foaled: 16 March 2016
- Country: Japan
- Colour: Chestnut
- Breeder: Northern Farm
- Owner: Riichi Kondo
- Racing colours
- Trainer: Yasuo Tomomichi
- Jockey: Mirco Demuro
- Record: 13: 6-1-3
- Earnings: ¥322,195,000 + HK$16,750,000

Major wins
- Daily Hai Nisai Stakes (2018); Asahi Hai Futurity Stakes (2018); NHK Mile Cup (2019); Hong Kong Mile (2019)

Awards
- JRA Award for Best Two-Year-Old Colt (2018)

Admire Mars (Japanese: アドマイヤマーズ, Hepburn: Adomaiya Māzu; foaled 16 March 2016) is a Japanese Thoroughbred racehorse and active sire. As a juvenile in 2018 he was undefeated in four races including the Daily Hai Nisai Stakes and the Asahi Hai Futurity Stakes and won the JRA Award for Best Two-Year-Old Colt. In his first two races of 2019 he was beaten in the Tokinominoru Kinen and the Satsuki Sho before returning to winning form to take the NHK Mile Cup. In December he won the Hong Kong Mile. He failed to win in 2020 but ran third in both the Mile Championship and the Hong Kong Mile.

== Background ==
Admire Mars is a chestnut horse with a white blaze and a long white sock on his left hind leg bred in Hokkaido by Northern Farm. As a yearling in 2017 he was consigned to the Select Sale and was bought for ¥56,160,000 by Riichi Kondo. He was sent into training with Yasuo Tomomichi.

He was from the eighth crop of foals sired by Daiwa Major, an outstanding miler whose wins included the Tenno Sho, Mile Championship and Yasuda Kinen. As a breeding stallion he has also sired Major Emblem, Curren Black Hill (NHK Mile Cup), Reine Minoru (Oka Sho) and Epice Arome (Centaur Stakes). Admire Mars' dam Via Medici showed good racing form in France, winning four races including the Group 3 Prix de Lieurey. She was sold for €480,000 in December 2014 and exported to Japan. Via Medici was a female line descendant of Rossellina, a full-sister to Ribot.

== Racing career ==
=== 2018: two-year-old season ===
Admire Mars was ridden in all of his 2018 starts by Mirco Demuro. The colt made a successful racecourse debut, recording a narrow win over Cadence Call in a contest for previously unraced juveniles over 1600 metres at Chukyo Racecourse on 30 June. Three weeks later, over the same course and distance, he followed up with a three length win in the Chukyo Nisai Stakes, beating A Shin Zone and five others.

On his return from a break of over four months Admire Mars was stepped up in class for the Grade 2 Daily Hai Nisai Stakes at Kyoto Racecourse on 10 November and went off the 4/5. He maintained his unbeaten record, winning by half a length from Meisho Shobu. On 16 December the colt was moved up in class again and started 3.6/1 second favourite behind the filly Gran Alegria for the Grade 1 Asahi Hai Futurity Stakes at Hanshin Racecourse. The best fancied of the other thirteen runners were Fantasist (Keio Hai Nisai Stakes), Cadence Call (Niigata Nisai Stakes), Meiner Surpass, De Gaulle (runner up in the Saudi Arabia Royal Cup), Emeral Flight and Aster Pegasus (Hakodate Nisai Stakes). Demuro settled the colt in third place as It's Cool set the pace from Gran Alegria before making a forward move as the field turned into the straight. Admire Mars gained the advantage 300 metres from the finish and drew away in the closing stages to win by two lengths from the outsider Kurino Gaudi with Gran Alegria half a length back in third. Demuro commented "everything went smoothly. He showed a terrific turn of foot. He's a smart colt and hates to lose so I'm looking forward to seeing how he improves next season".

In the official ratings for Japanese two-year-olds Admire Mars was rated the best juvenile of the year, one pound ahead of the Hopeful Stakes winner Saturnalia. In January 2019 Admire Mars topped the polling for the Best Two-Year-Old Colt at the JRA Awards for 2018, receiving 153 votes against Saturnalia's 123.

=== 2019: three-year-old season ===
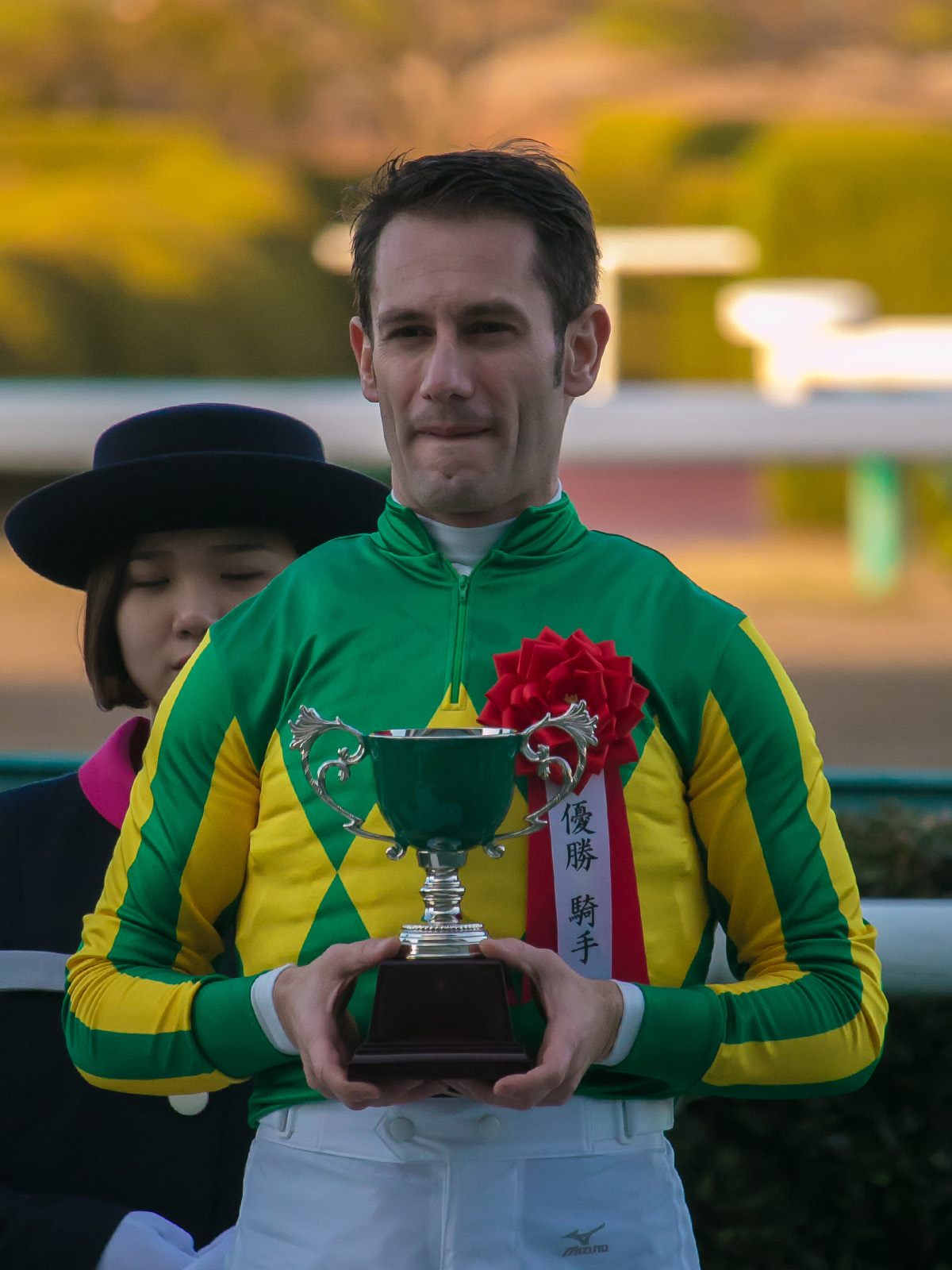
Admire Mars' regular jockey Mirco Demuro

Admire Mars began his second season on 10 February when he contested the Tokinominoru Kinen (a trial race for the Satsuki Sho) over 1800 metres at Tokyo Racecourse. He started the 0.7/1 favourite in a seven-runner field but sustained his first defeat as he was beaten one and a quarter lengths into second place by Yamanin Kingly. On 14 April at Nakayama Racecourse Admire Mars was made second favourite behind Saturnalia for the Satsuki Sho over 2000 metres. After tracking the leaders he was switched to the outside to make his challenge in the straight but despite making some progress he never looked likely to win and came home fourth behind Saturnalia, Velox and Yamanin Kingly beaten just over two lengths by the winner.

The 24th running of the Grade 1 NHK Mile Cup at Tokyo on 5 May saw Admire Mars dropped back in distance and start second favourite behind Gran Alegria, who was attempting to follow up her victory in the Oka Sho. The other sixteen runners included his old rivals Fantasist, Kurino Gaudi and Cadence Call as well as Danon Chaser (Kisaragi Sho), Wide Pharaoh (New Zealand Trophy), Pourville (Fillies' Revue), Iberis (Arlington Cup), Happy Hour (Falcon Stakes) and Val d'Isere (Shinzan Kinen). Admire Mars did not start well and was forced to race on the outside in mid-division as Iberis set the pace from Kurino Gaudi and Pourville. After turning into the straight he launched a sustained run down the centre of the track, took the lead 100 metres from the finish and won by half a length and a nose from Cadence Call and Catedral. After the race Demuro said "his start wasn't so good and we had to race in a lower position than hoped, but he just hates to lose - once another runner came up next to him, he found his second wind. He's truly an amazing miler".

On 19 October Admire Mars returned from a long summer break to contest the Grade 3 Fuji Stakes over 1600 metres at Tokyo in which he was matched against older horses. He was made the 1.1/1 favourite but was never in serious contention and came home ninth of the eighteen runners as victory went to the four-year-old filly Normcore. Riichi Kondo died in November 2019 and the ownership of the horse passed to the executors of his estate. For his final run of the year the colt was one of four Japanese horses sent to Sha Tin Racecourse to contest the Hong Kong Mile on 8 December when he was ridden by Christophe Soumillon and started a 26/1 outsider. Beauty Generation and Indy Champ started joint favourites while the other seven runners included Normcore, Persian Knight (Mile Championship) and Waikuku (Jockey Club Mile). After racing in mid-division Admire Mars began to make progress in last quarter mile, overtook Beauty Generation 150 metres from the finish, and repelled the late challenge of Waikuku to win by half a length. After the race Soumillon said "I knew my horse was very strong... he was the best two-year-old in Japan last year and probably the best three-year-old in Japan this year as well... I told the lad before the race when I saw the odds on the screen that there was something wrong there – I thought he should have been in the first four favourites... But I rode my race like he was the favourite and it paid off".

In January 2020, at the JRA Awards for 2019, Admire Mars finished runner-up to Saturnalia in the poll to determine the Best Three-Year-Old Colt, receiving 107 votes to his rival's 124. He also finished second to Indy Champ in the voting for the JRA Award for Best Sprinter or Miler

=== 2020: four-year-old season ===
In the early spring of 2020 Admire Mars was sent to the United Arab Emirates with the intention of contesting the Dubai Turf on 28 March but returned to Japan when the race was abandoned owing to the COVID-19 pandemic. He made his first appearance of the year in the Yasuda Kinen over 1600 metres at Tokyo when he started a 19.2/1 outsider and came home sixth behind Gran Alegria after racing in third place for most of the way.

Admire Mars was then off the track until 31 October when he ran third to Katsuji and Stelvio in the Grade 2 Swan Stakes over 1400 metres at Kyoto, conceding weight to the first two finishers. On 22 November the colt went off the 10.1/ fourth choice in the betting for the Mile Championship at Hanshin. Ridden as in his previous 2020 starts by Yuga Kawada he took the lead 200 metres from the finish but was beaten into third place by Gran Alegria and Indy Champ. In December he returned to Sha Tin and was partnered by Ryan Moore as he attempted to repeat his 2019 success in the Hong Kong Mile. Starting at odds of 4.4/1 he went to the front 400 metres out but was overtaken in the straight and came home third behind the locally trained contenders Golden Sixty and Southern Legend. He closed out his career with three straight third-place finish.

In the 2020 World's Best Racehorse Rankings, Admire Mars was rated on 118, making him the equal 80th best racehorse in the world.

== Racing form ==
Below data is based on data available on JBIS Search, netkeiba.com and Hong Kong Jockey Club.

| Date | Track | Race | Grade | Distance (Condition) | Entry | HN | Odds (Favored) | Finish | Time | Margins | Jockey | Winner (Runner-up) |
|---|---|---|---|---|---|---|---|---|---|---|---|---|
2018 – two-year-old season
| Jun 30 | Chukyo | 2yo Debut | | 1,600 m (Firm) | 8 | 7 | 1.4 (1) | 1st | 1:37.7 | 0.0 | Mirco Demuro | (Cadence Call) |
| Jul 21 | Chukyo | Chukyo Nisai Stakes | OP | 1,600 m (Firm) | 7 | 6 | 1.9 (1) | 1st | 1:34.7 | –0.5 | Mirco Demuro | (A Shin Zone) |
| Nov 10 | Kyoto | Daily Hai Nisai Stakes | 2 | 1,600 m (Firm) | 9 | 3 | 1.8 (1) | 1st | 1:35.4 | –0.1 | Mirco Demuro | (Meisho Shobu) |
| Dec 16 | Hanshin | Asahi Hai Futurity Stakes | 1 | 1,600 m (Firm) | 15 | 6 | 4.6 (2) | 1st | 1:33.9 | –0.3 | Mirco Demuro | (Kurino Gaudi) |
2019 – three-year-old season
| Feb 10 | Tokyo | Kyodo Tsushin Hai | 2 | 1,800 m (Firm) | 7 | 4 | 1.7 (1) | 2nd | 1:47.0 | 0.2 | Mirco Demuro | Danon Kingly |
| Apr 14 | Nakayama | Satsuki Sho | 1 | 2,000 m (Firm) | 18 | 1 | 5.7 (2) | 4th | 1:58.5 | 0.4 | Mirco Demuro | Saturnalia |
| May 5 | Tokyo | NHK Mile Cup | 1 | 1,600 m (Firm) | 18 | 17 | 4.3 (2) | 1st | 1:32.4 | –0.1 | Mirco Demuro | (Cadence Call) |
| Oct 19 | Tokyo | Fuji Stakes | 2 | 1,600 m (Good) | 18 | 7 | 2.1 (1) | 9th | 1:33.7 | 0.7 | Mirco Demuro | Normcore |
| Dec 8 | Sha Tin | Hong Kong Mile | 1 | 1,600 m (Firm) | 10 | 9 | 13.4 (5) | 1st | 1:33.2 | 0.0 | Christophe Soumillon | (Waikuku) |
2020 – four-year-old season
| Jun 7 | Tokyo | Yasuda Kinen | 1 | 1,600 m (Good) | 14 | 9 | 20.2 (6) | 6th | 1:32.3 | 0.7 | Yuga Kawada | Gran Alegria |
| Oct 31 | Kyoto | Swan Stakes | 2 | 1,400 m (Firm) | 16 | 2 | 2.8 (2) | 3rd | 1:21.5 | 0.3 | Yuga Kawada | Katsuji |
| Nov 22 | Hanshin | Mile Championship | 1 | 1,600 m (Firm) | 17 | 7 | 11.7 (5) | 3rd | 1:32.2 | 0.2 | Yuga Kawada | Gran Alegria |
| Dec 13 | Sha Tin | Hong Kong Mile | 1 | 1,600 m (Firm) | 10 | 3 | 2.9 (2) | 3rd | 1:33.8 | 0.4 | Ryan Moore | Golden Sixty |

Legend:
Turf

== Stud record ==
Admire Mars started his stud duty in 2021 at Shadai Stallion Station for a fee of 3,000,000 JPY. In addition, he also gets shuttled to stud in Australia at Arrowfield Stud for a fee of 22,000 AUD.

=== Notable progeny ===
Below data is based on JBIS Stallion Reports.

c = colt, f = filly
bold = grade 1 stakes

| **Foaled** | **Name** | **Sex** | **Major Wins** |
| 2022 | Embroidery | f | Daily Hai Queen Cup, **Oka Sho**, **Shūka Sho**, Hanshin Himba Stakes, **Victoria Mile** |

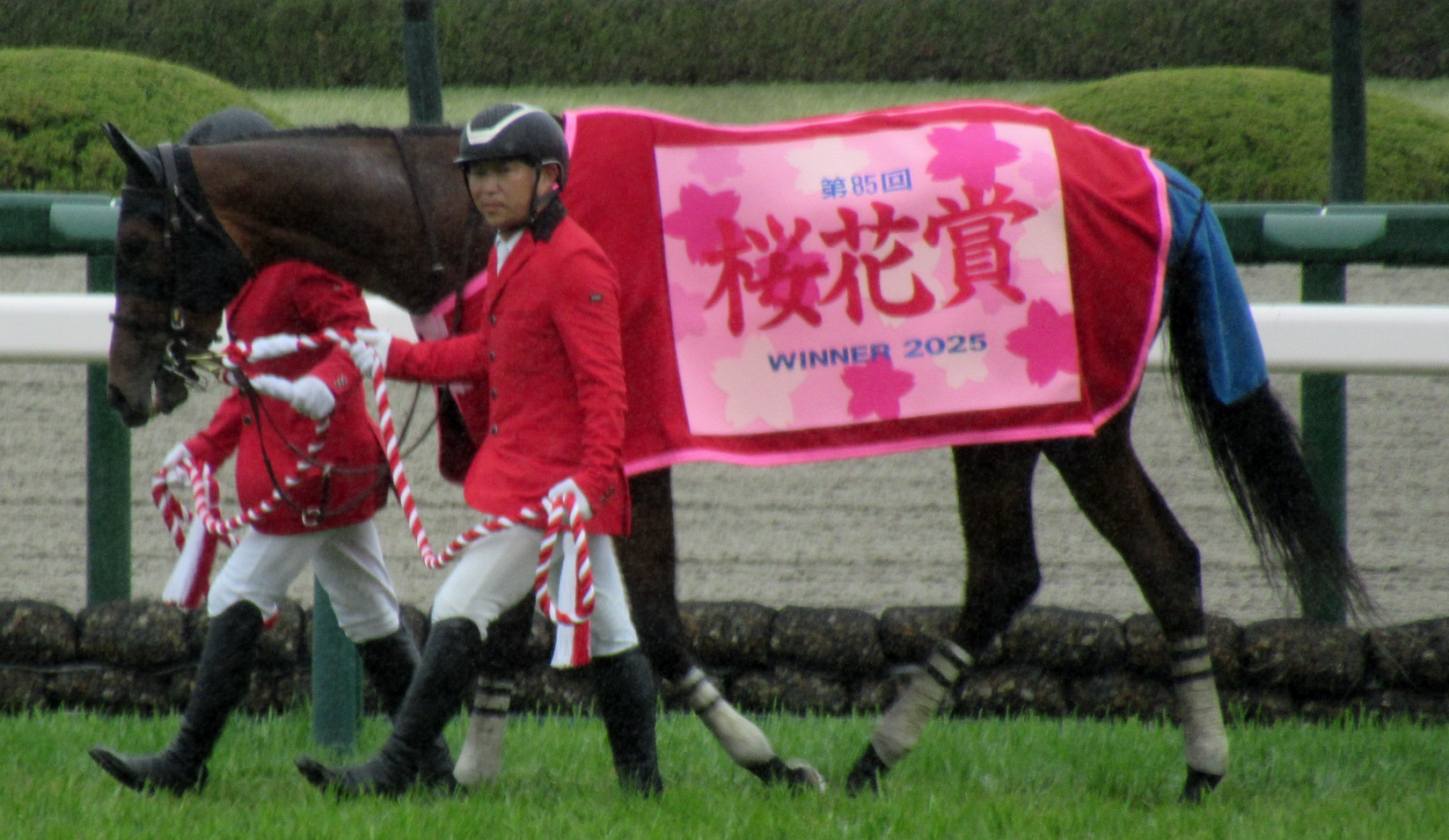
Embroidery

== Pedigree ==
Pedigree of Admire Mars (JPN), chestnut colt 2016
| Sire Daiwa Major (JPN) 2001 | Sunday Silence (USA); 1986 | Halo | Hail to Reason |
| Sire Daiwa Major (JPN) 2001 | Sunday Silence (USA); 1986 | Halo | Cosmah |
| Sire Daiwa Major (JPN) 2001 | Sunday Silence (USA); 1986 | Wishing Well | Understanding |
| Sire Daiwa Major (JPN) 2001 | Sunday Silence (USA); 1986 | Wishing Well | Mountain Flower |
| Sire Daiwa Major (JPN) 2001 | Scarlet Bouquet (JPN); 1988 | Northern Taste (CAN) | Northern Dancer |
| Sire Daiwa Major (JPN) 2001 | Scarlet Bouquet (JPN); 1988 | Northern Taste (CAN) | Lady Victoria |
| Sire Daiwa Major (JPN) 2001 | Scarlet Bouquet (JPN); 1988 | Scarlet Ink (USA) | Crimson Satan |
| Sire Daiwa Major (JPN) 2001 | Scarlet Bouquet (JPN); 1988 | Scarlet Ink (USA) | Consentida |
| Dam Via Medici (IRE) 2007 | Medicean (GB); 1997 | Machiavellian (USA) | Mr. Prospector |
| Dam Via Medici (IRE) 2007 | Medicean (GB); 1997 | Machiavellian (USA) | Coup de Folie |
| Dam Via Medici (IRE) 2007 | Medicean (GB); 1997 | Mystic Goddess (USA) | Storm Bird (CAN) |
| Dam Via Medici (IRE) 2007 | Medicean (GB); 1997 | Mystic Goddess (USA) | Rose Goddess (IRE) |
| Dam Via Medici (IRE) 2007 | Via Milano (FR); 2001 | Singspiel (IRE) | In The Wings (GB) |
| Dam Via Medici (IRE) 2007 | Via Milano (FR); 2001 | Singspiel (IRE) | Glorious Song (CAN) |
| Dam Via Medici (IRE) 2007 | Via Milano (FR); 2001 | Salvinaxia | Linamix |
| Dam Via Medici (IRE) 2007 | Via Milano (FR); 2001 | Salvinaxia | Salve (Family: 4-l) |
