= Arlington Oaks =

- Class: Discontinued G3 stakes
- Location: Sheepshead Bay Race Track, Sheepshead Bay, Brooklyn, New York, United States
- Inaugurated: 1930
- Race type: Thoroughbred – Flat racing

Race information
- Distance: 1 1/8 miles (9 furlongs)
- Surface: Dirt
- Track: left-handed
- Qualification: Three-year-old fillies
- Purse: $150,000

The Arlington Oaks was an American Grade III Thoroughbred horse race run at Arlington Park racetrack near Chicago. Raced on dirt over a distance of 1 1/8 miles (9 Furlongs), the race is restricted to three-year-old fillies. It currently offers a purse of $150,000.

Inaugurated in 1930, after the running of the 1932 edition, the race was not run again until 1980. There was no race in 1998 and 1999 and was run for the last time in 2014.

Known as the Arlington Oaks from 1930 to 1992 and in 2000, it was run as the Arlington Heights Oaks from 1993 to 1997, the Singapore Plate from 2001 to 2003, and as the Arlington Breeders' Cup Oaks in 2004.

In 1985, the race was hosted by the Hawthorne Race Course.

== Historical notes ==
Alcibiades, Hal Price Headley's 1929 American Champion Two-Year-Old Filly won the July 5, 1930 inaugural running of the Arlington Oaks. She would end the year being selected the Three-Year-Old Champion Filly. The Grade 1 Alcibiades Stakes at Keeneland is named in her honor.

Canfli won the second edition of the Oaks for the stable of W. D. Waggoner and brothers from Texas. The New York Times reported that 25,000 racing patrons were on hand to see the 1931 race.

The Sonny Whitney owned 1932 Oaks winner Top Flight would also be named the Two and Three-Year-Old Filly Champion plus future induction into the U.S. Racing Hall of Fame.

In 2001, a year the race was run as the Singapore Plate, Caressing was the winner, following up on her 2000 Breeders' Cup Juvenile Fillies victory that had clinched Two-Year-Old National Champion Filly honors for her.

In 2005, film director John Gatins made a motion picture titled Dreamer: Inspired by a True Story in which the horse "Soñador" is based on 1994 Arlington Oaks winner, Mariah's Storm.

== Records ==
Speed record:

- 1:48 1/5 @ 1 1/8 miles: Choose A Partner (1983)

Most wins by a jockey:

- 2 – Earlie Fires (1981, 1982)
- 2 – Shane Sellers (1991, 1993)
- 2 – Garrett Gomez (1992, 1997)
- 2 – Robby Albarado (1996, 2006)
- 2 – Mark Guidry (2000, 2007)
- 2 – René Douglas (2001, 2002)

Most wins by a trainer:

- 4 – Carl Nafzger (1983, 1989, 1991, 1995)

Most wins by an owner:

- 2 – Russell L. Reineman Stable Inc. (1981, 1995)
- 2 – Wimborne Farm (1993, 1996)
- 2 – Stonerside Stable (1997, 2004)

== Winners ==
Year	Winner	Age	Jockey	Trainer	Owner	Dist. (Miles)	Time	Win$	Gr.
2014	Aurelia's Belle	3	Channing Hill	Wayne M. Catalano	James F. Miller	1 1/8 m	1:52.34	$90,000	G3
2013	My Option	3	Eduardo E. Perez	Chris M. Block	Timothy J. Keeley	1 1/8 m	1:52.85	$90,000	G3
2012	La Tia	3	Constantino Roman	Brian Williamson	Hernandez Racing Club	1 1/8 m	1:51.46	$90,000	G3
2011	Race not held								
2010	Upperline	3	E. T. Baird	Michael Stidham	Stidham & affiliates	1 1/8 m	1:52.13	$60,000	G3
2009	Peach Brew	3	Quincy Hamilton	Donnie K. Von Hemel	Robert H. Zoellner	1 1/8 m	1:50.89	$90,000	G3
2008	Sky Mom	3	Ramsey Zimmerman	Steve Asmussen	Heather Stark	1 1/8 m	1:52.92	$60,000	G3
2007	Marietta	3	Mark Guidry	Eoin G. Harty	Darley Racing	1 1/8 m	1:49.39	$60,000	G3
2006	Cryptoquip	3	Robby Albarado	Thomas F. Proctor	Elisabeth H. Alexander	1 1/8 m	1:49.42	$90,000	G3
2005	Miss Matched	3	Shaun Bridgmohan	John T. Ward Jr.	John C. Oxley	1 1/8 m	1:49.39	$60,000	G3
2004	Catboat (DH)	3	Eddie Martin Jr	Bernard S. Flint	Stonerside Stable	1 1/8 m	1:51.06	$90,000	G3
2004	Lovely Afternoon (DH)	3	James Graham	Anthony Mitchell	Richard Otto Stables				
2003	Sue's Good News	3	Tim Doocy	Steve Hobby	Cresran LLC (Carol V. Ricks)	1 1/8 m	1:50.53	$60,000	G3
2002	Lost At Sea	3	René Douglas	Jerry Hollendorfer	Peter Abruzzo & John A. Franks	1 1/8 m	1:50.58	$60,000	G3
2001	Caressing	3	René Douglas	David R. Vance	Carl F. Pollard	1 1/8 m	1:50.74	$75,000	G3
2000	Megans Bluff	3	Mark Guidry	John Hennig	James C. Routsong	1 1/8 m	1:50.22	$75,000	G3
1998	– 1999	Race not held							
1997	Minister's Melody	3	Garrett Gomez	Niall O'Callaghan	Stonerside Stable	1 1/8 m	1:51.32	$60,000	G3
1996	Cuando Puede	3	Robby Albarado	Bruce Hundley	Wimborne Farm	1 1/8 m	1:51.33	$75,000	G3
1995	Niner's Home	3	Tracy Hebert	Carl Nafzger	Russell L. Reineman Stable Inc.	1 1/8 m	1:52.15	$45,000	G3
1994	Mariah's Storm	3	Robert Lester	Donnie K. Von Hemel	Thunderhead Farms	1 1/8 m	1:49.63	$60,000	G3
1993	Added Asset	3	Shane Sellers	Peter Perkins	Wimborne Farm	1 1/8 m	1:50.19	$60,000	G3
1992	Pleasant Baby	3	Garrett Gomez	J. Bert Sonnier	Saron Stable	1 1/8 m	1:55.18	$45,000	G3
1991	Til Forbid	3	Shane Sellers	Carl Nafzger	James B. Tafel	1 1/8 m	1:49.60	$45,000	G3
1990	Overturned	3	Randy Romero	George R. Arnold II	John Poppas & Glencrest Farm (John & David Greathouse)	1 1/8 m	1:50.40	$45,000	G3
1989	Confirmed Dancer	3	Mike E. Smith	Carl Nafzger	Tadahiro Hotehama	1 1/8 m	1:52.60	$45,000	G3
1988	Race not held								
1987	Shot Gun Bonnie	3	Carlos H. Marquez Jr.	David C. Kassen	Hamilton Friedberg & Morton D. Kesser	1 1/8 m	1:53.40	$45,000	G3
1986	Top Corsage	3	Gary Stevens	Jerry Fanning	Dan J. Agnew	1 1/8 m	1:49.40	$60,000	G3
1985	Just Anything	3	Juvenile Diaz	Harry Trotsek	Krista Seltzer & G. Loving	1 1/8 m	1:50.40	$45,000	G3
1984	Lucky Lucky Lucky	3	Robbie Davis	D. Wayne Lukas	Leslie Combs II & Equities Stable	1 1/8 m	1:49.80	$45,000	G3
1983	Choose A Partner	3	Kerwin Clark	Carl Nafzger	Frances A. Genter Stable	1 1/8 m	1:48.20	$45,000	G3
1982	Hurry Renee	3	Earlie Fires	Larry Geiger	Marcel Walder	1 1/8 m	1:50.40	$45,000	G3
1981	Sweetest Chant	3	Earlie Fires	Joseph M. Bollero	Russell L. Reineman Stable Inc.	1 1/8 m	1:49.60	$60,000	
1980	Ribbon	3	Pat Day	Harry Trotsek	Arthur B. Hancock III & Leone J. Peters	1 1/8 m	1:50.00	$45,000	
1933	– 1979	Race not held							
1932	Top Flight	3	Raymond Workman	Thomas J. Healey	Sonny Whitney	1 1/8 m	1:50.80	$13,475	
1931	Canfli	3	Peter Dyer	Richard N. Vestal	Three D's Stock Farm Stable (Waggoner brothers)	1 1/8 m	1:51.80	$14,875	
1930	Alcibiades	3	James W. Smith	Walter Taylor	Hal Price Headley	1 1/8 m	1:52.80	$12,975	
