= West Coast (horse) =

American-bred Thoroughbred racehorse

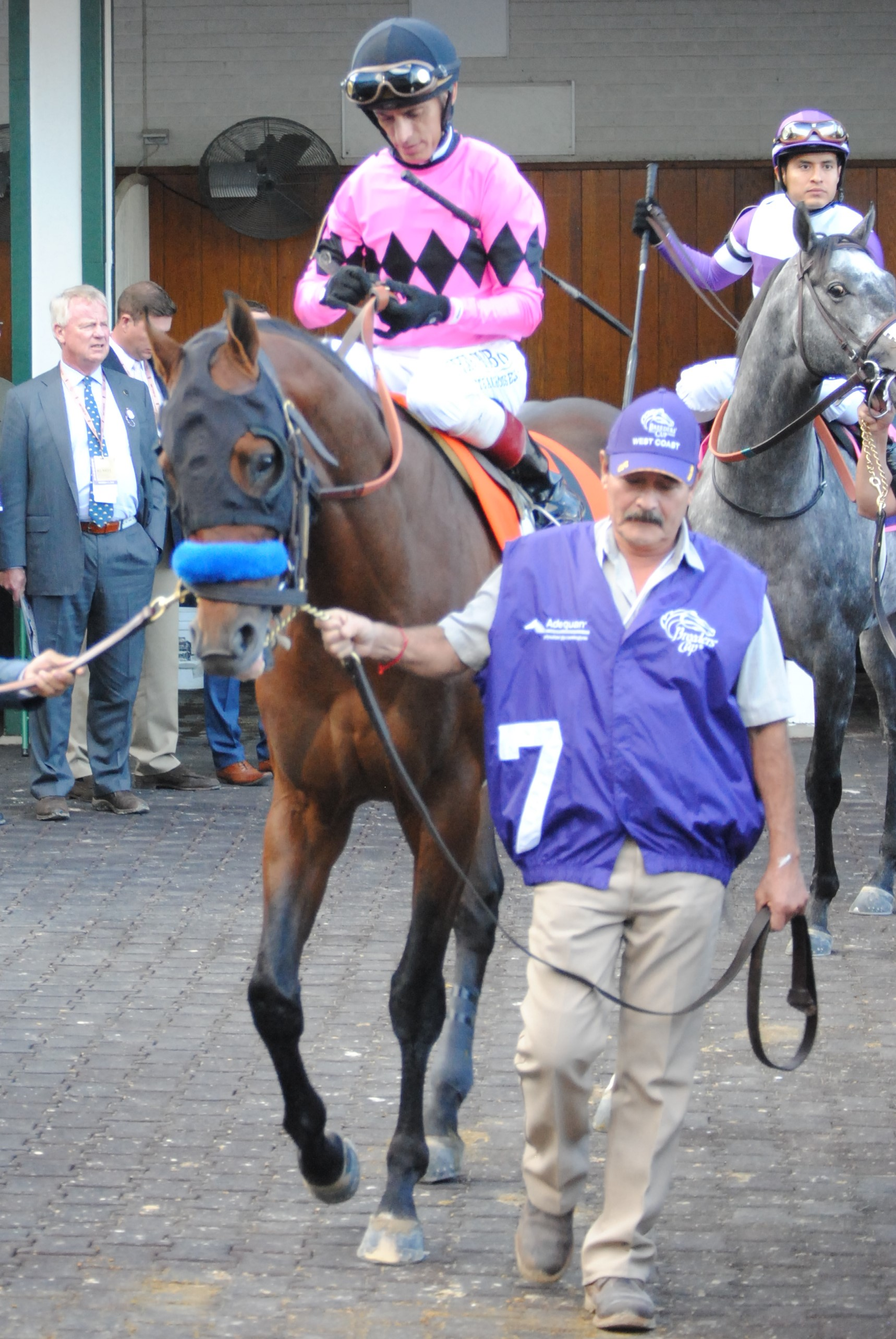
- West Coast at the 2018 Breeders' Cup
- Sire: Flatter
- Grandsire: A.P. Indy
- Dam: Caressing
- Damsire: Honour and Glory
- Sex: Colt
- Foaled: May 14, 2014
- Country: United States
- Colour: Bay
- Breeder: CFP Thoroughbreds LLC
- Owner: Mary & Gary West
- Trainer: Bob Baffert
- Record: 13: 6-5-1
- Earnings: $5,803,800

Major wins
- Easy Goer Stakes (2017); Los Alamitos Derby (2017); Travers Stakes (2017); Pennsylvania Derby (2017)

Awards
- American Champion Three-Year-Old Male Horse (2017)
- Last updated on November 20, 2018

West Coast (foaled May 14, 2014) is a retired American Thoroughbred racehorse, foaled, raised and sold by historic Thoroughbred nursery, Hermitage Farm. Unraced at age two, he was named the Champion three-year-old colt of 2017 after wins in the Travers Stakes and Pennsylvania Derby, plus a third-place finish in the Breeders' Cup Classic. At age four, he finished second in the Pegasus World Cup, Dubai World Cup and Awesome Again Stakes. He finished his career with a record of six wins from 13 starts and earnings of $5,803,800.

== Background ==
West Coast was bred in Kentucky by Carl Pollard's CFP Thoroughbreds LLC and was foaled and raised at Hermitage Farm. His sire was Flatter, who won four of six starts but finished third in his only stakes appearance. As a well bred son of leading sire A.P. Indy and notable broodmare Praise, Flatter was given a chance at stud by his owners, Claiborne Farm, and developed into a solid sire. West Coast's dam Caressing was the champion two-year-old filly of 2000.

West Coast was sold by Hermitage Farm at the Keeneland September 2015 Yearling Sale to agent Ben Glass for Gary and Mary West. The Wests were not normally interested in late foals and West Coast had been foaled on May 14, after their normal cut-off date. "But I just loved this colt," said Glass. "He was so charismatic and carried himself so well. He had such a fluid walk he would slink along like a panther. He had good size and a great big overstep on him." Glass set a price limit of $350,000 for the colt but eventually went to $425,000.

West Coast was trained by Hall of Famer Bob Baffert.

== Racing career ==
=== 2017: three-year-old season ===
West Coast did not race at age two because Baffert felt the colt needed more time to develop. He made his racing debut as a three-year-old on February 18, 2017, in a maiden special weight race at Santa Anita, where he finished second. He broke his maiden in his second start on March 12, then was stepped up to graded stakes company in the Lexington Stakes at Keeneland in Kentucky on April 16. Drawing post position 10, he raced near the back of the pack during the early running and was carried five wide into the first turn. He started to make up ground while going four wide around the far turn and moved into the lead mid-stretch but was caught in the final strides to lose by a head.

He then returned to Santa Anita, where he won an allowance race on May 20 before being shipped across country to Belmont Park for the Easy Goer Stakes on June 10. After settling near the back of the field for the first half mile, he made a strong move down the stretch to win by 3 3/4 lengths. "We thought he'd run well," Baffert said. "We were debating running in the Belmont [Stakes]. He didn't convince us yet, but he's figuring it out. He's really developing the right way."

West Coast returned to California to make his next start in the Los Alamitos Derby on July 15. Going off as the odds-on favorite, he made a "leisurely" run down the backstretch while sitting in fifth place but swept by the early leaders in the stretch to win by 2 3/4 lengths. "It was sort of a gamble to sit back there, but it paid off,” said Baffert. "Then when he turned for home I said, 'I think we're OK.' He's a good horse and it's a long stretch. All of a sudden he just took off, getting into stride."

West Coast then traveled to Saratoga Race Course in upstate New York for the prestigious Travers Stakes on August 26. The field for the so-called "Midsummer Derby" featured nine graded stakes winners, including Always Dreaming (Kentucky Derby), Cloud Computing (Preakness Stakes), and Tapwrit (Belmont Stakes). Baffert remained in California, leaving the colt under the care of assistant trainer Jimmy Barnes. Before the race, Baffert texted jockey Mike Smith to ride West Coast like he was Smith's own horse. Given the lack of early speed horses in the race, Smith changed tactics and went to the early lead followed closely by Always Dreaming. "I thought there wasn't much pace, but man, I caught a good jump, put him on the lead, and he just cruised from there,” said Smith.

West Coast set moderate fractions with Always Dreaming pressing the pace to his outside down the backstretch. Around the far turn, Always Dreaming faded, but Gunnevera and Irap closed ground to challenge. Gunnevera closed to within half a length at the top of the stretch before West Coast responded to again draw away, winning by 3 1/4 lengths. "He was a happy horse all the way around there,” said Smith. "There was a time or two when they came to me, but he just put them away, and every time they would, he'd take a big old breath of air."

The result gave Baffert back-to-back wins in the Travers, the first trainer to repeat in the race since Shug McGaughey in 1989–90. Baffert had won in 2016 with Arrogate, who like West Coast had been a late-developing colt who Baffert gave time to develop. Baffert had also finished second in the 2015 Travers with Triple Crown champion American Pharoah.

Now considered one of the top colts in the three-year-old division, West Coast made his next start in the Pennsylvania Derby, where he went off as the odds-on favorite. Smith settled West Coast just behind the early leader Outplay, then moved to the lead rounding into the stretch. Irap closed from midpack to finish second but never challenged West Coast, who won by 7 1/4 lengths. "He's just better than they are,” said Smith. "As a matter of fact, he was getting bored."

On November 4, West Coast faced older horses for the first time in the Breeders' Cup Classic. The 9-5 morning-line favorite was Gun Runner, who had won three Grade I races in a row. The next four betting choices were all trained by Baffert: Arrogate (Pegasus World Cup, Dubai World Cup) at 2-1, West Coast at 6-1, Collected (Pacific Classic) at 6-1, and Mubtaahij (Awesome Again Stakes) at 12-1. With none of the Baffert horses eager to set the pace, Gun Runner went to the early lead, then shrugged off a challenge from Collected on the far turn to win. West Coast tracked the leaders and held off a late challenge to finish third.

On January 25, 2018, West Coast was voted 2017 American Champion Three-Year-Old Male Horse.

=== 2018: four-year-old season ===
West Coast made the first start of his four-year-old campaign on January 27, 2018, in the Pegasus World Cup at Gulfstream Park. He rated in fourth place behind the early pace set by Collected and Gun Runner, then made his move on the final turn. However, he could not keep pace with Gun Runner and finished second, though well clear of the rest of the field. "Turning for home I thought Gun Runner might be a little empty, but his tank is so big and he just kept going," said Baffert. "I can't really complain. We just got beat by a really good horse. He was tested the whole way around there. It was a good horse race. I just came up a little short."

West Coast next shipped to Meydan Racecourse for the Dubai World Cup, held on March 31. He dueled for the early lead with Thunder Snow but started to lose contact around the final turn and finished 5 3/4 lengths behind in second.

After returning to America, West Coast was turned out for several weeks before resuming training in the summer. He returned to racing on September 29 in the Awesome Again Stakes where he again finished second, this time to Accelerate. "He really ran a huge race," said new jockey Mike Smith. "I really couldn't ask for more out of him. He really needed that push, and we forced him to move forward a little more, but I think that he did it well, and it was good for him."

West Coast made his final start in the 2018 Breeders' Cup Classic on November 3 at Churchill Downs. He vied for the early lead but tired and finished seventh.

== Retirement ==
West Coast entered stud at Lane's End Farm in 2019. His first foals were of racing age in 2022. Following five years at Lane's End, the bay stallion was sold to a farm in Ecuador where he would begin to stand stud in 2025.

== Statistics ==
Date	Age	Distance	Race	Grade	Track	Odds	Field	Finish	Winning Time	Winning (Losing) Margin	Jockey	Ref
Feb 18, 2017	3	1 mile	Maiden Special Weight	Maiden	Santa Anita Park	5.30	9	2	1:35.29	(1 1/2) lengths	Martin Garcia	
Mar 12, 2017	3	1 1/16 miles	Maiden Special Weight	Maiden	Santa Anita Park	0.85*	3	1	1:44.14	3 1/4 lengths	Martin Garcia	
Apr 16, 2017	3	1 1/16 miles	Lexington Stakes	III	Keeneland	2.00	10	2	1:45.05	(head)	Flavien Prat	
May 20, 2017	3	1 1/16 miles	Allowance optional claiming	Allowance	Santa Anita Park	0.30*	6	1	1:44.14	3/4 lengths	Martin Garcia	
Jun 10, 2017	3	1 1/16 miles	Easy Goer Stakes	Listed	Belmont Park	1.85*	9	1	1:41.50	3 3/4 lengths	Mike Smith	
Jul 15, 2017	3	1 1/8 miles	Los Alamitos Derby	III	Los Alamitos	0.40*	7	1	1:48.65	2 3/4 lengths	Drayden Van Dyke	
Aug 26, 2017	3	1 1/4 miles	Travers Stakes	I	Saratoga	6.10	12	1	2:01.19	3 1/4 lengths	Mike Smith	
Sep 23, 2017	3	1 1/8 miles	Pennsylvania Derby	I	PARX Racing	0.90*	10	1	1:49.91	7 1/4 lengths	Mike Smith	
Nov 4, 2017	3	1 1/4 miles	2017 Breeders' Cup Classic	I	Del Mar	4.20	11	3	2:01.29	(3 1/2 lengths)	Javier Castellano	
Jan 27, 2018	4	1 1/8 miles	Pegasus World Cup	I	Gulfstream Park	3.70	12	2	1:47.41	(2 1/2 lengths)	Javier Castellano	
Mar 31, 2018	4	2000 meters ~1 1/4 miles	Dubai World Cup	I	Meydan	n/a	10	2	2:01.38	(5 3/4 lengths)	Javier Castellano	
Sep 29, 2018	4	1 1/8 miles	Awesome Again Stakes	I	Santa Anita	1.70	6	2	1:50.38	(2 1/4 lengths)	Mike Smith	
Nov 3, 2018	4	1 1/4 miles	2018 Breeders' Cup	I	Churchill Downs	6.60	14	7	2:02.93	(7 1/4 lengths)	John Velazquez	

== Pedigree ==
Pedigree of West Coast, bay colt, May 14, 2014
Sire Flatter 1999	A.P. Indy; 1989	Seattle Slew	Bold Reasoning
Sire Flatter 1999	A.P. Indy; 1989	Seattle Slew	My Charmer
Sire Flatter 1999	A.P. Indy; 1989	Weekend Surprise	Secretariat
Sire Flatter 1999	A.P. Indy; 1989	Weekend Surprise	Lassie Dear
Sire Flatter 1999	Praise; 1994	Mr. Prospector	Raise a Native
Sire Flatter 1999	Praise; 1994	Mr. Prospector	Gold Digger
Sire Flatter 1999	Praise; 1994	Wild Applause	Northern Dancer
Sire Flatter 1999	Praise; 1994	Wild Applause	Glowing Tribute
Dam Caressing 1998	Honour and Glory; 1993	Relaunch	In Reality
Dam Caressing 1998	Honour and Glory; 1993	Relaunch	Foggy Note
Dam Caressing 1998	Honour and Glory; 1993	Fair to All	Al Nasr (FR)
Dam Caressing 1998	Honour and Glory; 1993	Fair to All	Gonfalon
Dam Caressing 1998	Lovin Touch; 1980	Majestic Prince	Raise a Native
Dam Caressing 1998	Lovin Touch; 1980	Majestic Prince	Gay Hostess
Dam Caressing 1998	Lovin Touch; 1980	Forest Princess	Fleet Nasrullah
Dam Caressing 1998	Lovin Touch; 1980	Forest Princess	Queen Hostess (family: 9-f)

West Coast is inbred 4 x 4 to Raise a Native, meaning that stallion appears twice in the fourth generation of his pedigree.
