= Caressing (horse) =

American Thoroughbred racehorse

- Sire: Honour and Glory
- Grandsire: Relaunch
- Dam: Lovin Touch
- Damsire: Majestic Prince
- Sex: Mare
- Foaled: April 18, 1998
- Died: September 14, 2021 (aged 23)
- Country: United States
- Color: Bay
- Breeder: Brereton C. Jones
- Owner: Carl F. Pollard
- Trainer: David R. Vance
- Record: 18: 5–2–3
- Earnings: $955,998

Major wins
- Bassinet Stakes (2000); La Troienne Stakes (2001); Singapore Plate (2001); Breeders' Cup wins: Breeders' Cup Juvenile Fillies (2000)

Awards
- American Champion Two-Year-Old Filly (2000)

Caressing (April 18, 1998 – September 14, 2021) was an American Thoroughbred racehorse and broodmare. She won five of her eighteen races in a track career which lasted from July 2000 until November 2002. As a two-year-old she won two of her first four races before recording a 47/1 upset win in the Breeders' Cup Juvenile Fillies, which led to her being named American Champion Two-Year-Old Filly. In the following year her career was disrupted by illness but she did win the La Troienne Stakes and the Singapore Plate. After competing without success as a four-year-old she was retired from racing and had some success as a broodmare – the dam of two graded black type placed horses and multiple Grade 1 winner West Coast, Eclipse Champion 3 Year Old Male of 2018.

== Background ==
Caressing was a dark bay or brown mare bred in Kentucky by Brereton C. Jones. She was from the first crop of foals sired by Honour and Glory, a Kentucky-bred stallion whose wins included the Breeders' Futurity Stakes and the Metropolitan Handicap. Honour and Glory was a male-line descendant of the Godolphin Arabian, unlike more than 95% of modern thoroughbreds, who trace their ancestry to the Darley Arabian. Caressing's dam Lovin Touch won four races and finished second in the Black-Eyed Susan Stakes in 1983.

Caressing was consigned to the Keeneland sale as a yearling in 1999 and bought for $180,000 by the bloodstock agent Mike Ryan on behalf of Carl Pollard. She was sent into training with the Churchill Downs-based veteran trainer David R. Vance who described the "smallish" filly as "a little on the ornery side. She's fairly easy to train, but don't make her do something she doesn't want to do". Vance had sent out the winners of over a thousand races in a 34-year training career and was based in Barn 48 on the Churchill Downs backstretch. The overwhelming majority of his wins had come in claiming races, but he had enjoyed some top-level success in the 1970s with Honky Star, a racemare who won the Monmouth Oaks and the Cotillion Handicap.

== Racing career ==
=== 2000: two-year-old season ===
Caressing made her track debut in a maiden race over five and a half furlongs at Churchill Downs on July 2 and finished fourth of the eleven runners behind Madam Full Charge. In August she started at odds of 2.2/1 in a similar event at Ellis Park Race Course. Ridden as in her previous start by Greta Kuntzweiler, she took the lead a quarter of a mile from the finish and won by a length from Selassie. Her next race was the six furlong Bassinet Stakes at River Downs on September 2. Starting at odds of 3.5/1, she took the lead on the final turn and drew away from her rivals in the straight to win by seven lengths. On September 30 Caressing was moved up in class and distance for the Arlington-Washington Lassie Stakes over one mile at Arlington Park, she finished second to Thunder Bertie, beaten two and three quarter lengths.

John Velazquez took over the ride from the injured Kuntzweiler when Caressing contested the seventeenth edition of the Breeders' Cup Juvenile Fillies, run that year at Churchill Downs on November 4. Before the race Vance commented "She deserves to get into the race", he said at the time. "We're taking a shot, but so are a lot of other people. Nobody is scared of anyone in this race. She knows the track at Churchill. She works well over it, and it's her home base." Raging Fever (winner of the Matron Stakes and the Frizette Stakes) started favorite ahead of Cindy's Hero (Del Mar Debutante Stakes) and Notable Career (Oak Leaf Stakes) with Caressing starting the 47/1 outsider of the fourteen runners field. Caressing raced in fifth place on the inside rail as Thunder Bertie set the pace before switching to the outside on the final turn. She took the lead a furlong from the finish and held off a late challenge from Platinum Tiara to win by half a length. After the race Velazquez commented "She gave me the best she's got. I couldn't have asked for a more perfect trip".

=== 2001: three-year-old season ===
Caressing was expected to begin her second season at Oaklawn Park but contracted a fever when being prepared for the Honeybee Stakes. The filly was sent to the Hagyard-Davidson-McGeee clinic near Lexington, Kentucky where she reportedly responded well to treatment. She made her belated three-year-old debut in the Grade III La Troienne Stakes over seven furlongs at Churchill Downs on May 3. Ridden by Pat Day, she started slowly and was repeatedly blocked and hampered in the early stages, but after being switched to the wide outside on the final turn she finished strongly to take the lead inside the final furlong and won by a length from Sweet Nanette. The filly was unplaced in her next two starts, finishing fifth behind Forest Secrets in the Acorn Stakes at Belmont Park in June, and seventh to Zonk when starting favorite for the Delaware Oaks in July. On August 11 Caressing, ridden by René Douglas started favourite for the Grade III Singapore Plate (better known as the Arlington Oaks) over nine furlongs at Arlington Park. She tracked the leaders before taking the lead in the straight and winning by a length from Gal On The Go. After the race, Douglas commented "She was very focused. [Vance] told me to try and keep her on the outside, but when I took her inside at one point she didn't hesitate at all."

Caressing failed to win in four subsequent races in 2001. She finished sixth behind Exogenous in the Gazelle Handicap at Belmont in September and third to Scoop in the Indiana Oaks at Hoosier Park in October. In November she ran fourth to Nasty Storm in the Churchill Downs Distaff and sixth to Forest Secrets when starting a 29/1 outsider for the Falls City Handicap.

=== 2002: four-year-old season ===
Caressing remained in training as a four-year-old, but failed to recover her best form. She began the year at Oaklawn Park where she finished fourth of the five runners in the Oaklawn Breeders' Cup Stakes and third when second favorite for the Listed Bayakoa Stakes. She was then covered by the stallion Fusaichi Pegasus and was found to be in foal (pregnant) but nevertheless resumed her racing career. She finished third in the Chicago Handicap in June before running second in the Iowa Distaff Stakes at Prairie Meadows a month later. She ended her racing career at Ellis Park Race Course on August 10, where she finished fourth behind Minister's Baby in the Grade III Gardenia Handicap.

== Assessment and awards ==
In the Eclipse Awards for 2000, Caressing was named American Champion Two-Year-Old Filly.

== Breeding record ==
Caressing was retired from racing to become a broodmare. She produced eight foals, seven of whom have won:

- My Goodness, a dark bay or brown filly, foaled in 2005, sired by Storm Cat, won one minor race from six starts in the United States. Dam of Danon Kingly.
- Fun Affair, bay filly, 2007, by Distorted Humor, won one minor race in Britain
- Dove Forest, dark bay or brown filly, 2008, by Forestry, won two minor races in the United States
- Royal Rhiannon, bay filly, 2009, by Broken Vow, won two minor races in the United States
- Stormy Caress, bay filly, 2010, by Stormy Atlantic, winless in seven races
- Gold Hawk, bay gelding, 2011, by Empire Maker, has won seven races and was stakes placed in the United States (active in 2017)
- Juan and Bina, bay colt, 2012, by Indian Charlie, won once and was stakes placed in the United States
- West Coast, bay colt, 2014, by Flatter, multiple graded stakes winner, including Grade I Travers Stakes

== Death ==
Caressing died on September 14, 2021, at Hermitage Farm.

== Pedigree ==
Pedigree of Caressing (USA), dark bay or brown mare, 1998
Sire Honour And Glory (USA) 1993	Relaunch (USA); 1976	In Reality	Intentionally
Sire Honour And Glory (USA) 1993	Relaunch (USA); 1976	In Reality	My Dear Girl
Sire Honour And Glory (USA) 1993	Relaunch (USA); 1976	Foggy Note	The Axe
Sire Honour And Glory (USA) 1993	Relaunch (USA); 1976	Foggy Note	Silver Song
Sire Honour And Glory (USA) 1993	Fair To All (USA); 1986	Al Nasr	Lyphard
Sire Honour And Glory (USA) 1993	Fair To All (USA); 1986	Al Nasr	Caretta
Sire Honour And Glory (USA) 1993	Fair To All (USA); 1986	Gonfalon	Francis S.
Sire Honour And Glory (USA) 1993	Fair To All (USA); 1986	Gonfalon	Grand Splendor
Dam Lovin Touch (USA) 1980	Majestic Prince (USA); 1966	Raise A Native	Native Dancer
Dam Lovin Touch (USA) 1980	Majestic Prince (USA); 1966	Raise A Native	Raise You
Dam Lovin Touch (USA) 1980	Majestic Prince (USA); 1966	Gay Hostess	Royal Charger
Dam Lovin Touch (USA) 1980	Majestic Prince (USA); 1966	Gay Hostess	Your Hostess
Dam Lovin Touch (USA) 1980	Forest Princess (USA); 1973	Fleet Nasrullah	Nasrullah
Dam Lovin Touch (USA) 1980	Forest Princess (USA); 1973	Fleet Nasrullah	Happy Go Fleet
Dam Lovin Touch (USA) 1980	Forest Princess (USA); 1973	Queen Hostess	My Host
Dam Lovin Touch (USA) 1980	Forest Princess (USA); 1973	Queen Hostess	Donut Queen (Family: 9-f)
