= David R. Vance =

American horse racing trainer

David Vance
Personal information
- Born: August 22, 1940 (age 85) Logansport, Indiana, United States
- Occupation: Trainer

Horse racing career
- Sport: Horse racing
- Career wins: 3,119+ (ongoing)

Major racing wins
- Oaklawn Handicap (1972); Rebel Stakes (1973); Cotillion Handicap (1974); Monmouth Oaks (2001); Arlington Oaks (2001); Mint Julep Handicap (2003); Doubledogdare Stakes (2003); Molly Pitcher Stakes (1975, 2004); Humana Distaff Handicap (2005) Breeders' Cup wins: Breeders' Cup Juvenile Fillies (2000)

Significant horses
- Caressing

David R. Vance (born August 22, 1940, in Logansport, Indiana) is an American Thoroughbred horse racing trainer who has won more than 3,000 races.

Vance has won three training titles at Churchill Downs, three at Keystone Racetrack and two at the now defunct Garden State Park.

One of his best horses was Caressing, winner of the 2000 Breeders' Cup Juvenile Fillies who was voted the Eclipse Award as American Champion Two-Year-Old Filly.
