= Hong Kong International Races =

Annual horse racing event in Hong Kong

Hong Kong International Races (香港國際賽事) is an event consisting of the four most prestigious horse races in Hong Kong hosted by the Hong Kong Jockey Club. The four races are: Hong Kong Sprint (1200m), Hong Kong Mile (1600m), Hong Kong Cup (2000m), and Hong Kong Vase (2400m).

The event is run annually in mid-December at Sha Tin Racecourse.

The event has been sponsored by Cathay Pacific Airways from 2004 to 2011. But since 2012, the Swiss watch brand, Longines, has been sponsoring the event, with its official title as Longines Hong Kong International Races.

The event is televised around the globe. In 2006, the total purse was 62 million HKD, which was increased to 110 million HKD in 2022.

== History ==
1989 marked the start of the Hong Kong Cup, which was initially called Hong Kong Invitation Cup and restricted to horses from Singapore, Malaysia and Hong Kong. The first winner was Flying Dancer, owned by Lim Por Yen and trained by Ping Chee Kan.

The race quickly gained attention and was gradually opened to horses from other countries. Starting in 1991 other races were added to the program and today horses from all over the world compete in the event.

== Races ==
=== Hong Kong Cup ===
The Hong Kong Cup is the world's richest turf race over 2000 meters with a total purse of HKD$34million in 2022, and was the finale of the now defunct World Racing Championships from 1999 to 2005.

=== Hong Kong Mile ===
The Hong Kong Mile had a prize money of HK$30 million in 2022. The race was first run in 1991 to mark the staging of the 22nd Asian Racing Conference and was run over 1400m. From 1999 it was renamed Hong Kong Mile and run over 1600m. It became the World's richest mile race in 2002.

=== Hong Kong Vase ===
The Hong Kong Vase was introduced in 1994. It is run over 2400m and had a purse of HK$22 million in 2022.

=== Hong Kong Sprint ===
The Hong Kong Sprint was debuted in 1999 and was run over 1200m. In 2022 it had a HK$24 million purse, and it is one of the richest races in the world over 1200m or shorter.

Silent Witness became back to back winner of the Hong Kong Sprint in 2003 and 2004.
