= Carlingford Stakes =

Flat horse race in Ireland

- Class: Listed
- Location: Dundalk Stadium; County Louth, Ireland
- Race type: Flat / Thoroughbred
- Website: Dundalk

Race information
- Distance: 1m 2f 150y (2,149 m)
- Surface: Polytrack
- Track: Left-handed
- Qualification: Three-years-old and up
- Weight: 9 st 3 lb (3yo); 9 st 7 lb (4yo+); Allowances; 3 lb for fillies and mares Penalties; 7 lb for Group 1 or 2 winners* 5 lb for Group 3 winners * 3 lb for Listed winners * * since 1 January
- Purse: €50,000 (2018); 1st: €29,500

Carlingford Stakes
2016
Hawke	Elusive Heights	Tennessee Wildcat

Previous years
2015
Fire Fighting	Hot Sauce	Mandatario
2014
Chance To Dance	Obliterator	Afonso De Sousa
2013
Paene Magnus	Manalapan	Afonso De Sousa
2012
Paene Magnus	Muck 'N' Brass	Banna Boirche
2011
Celebrity Sevi	Priomhbhean	Super Say
2010
Shimmering Moment	Bob Le Beau	Bikini Babe
2009
Indiana Gal	Ransomed Bride	Re Barolo
2008
Fiery Lad	Varsity	Northgate
2007
Red Moloney	Ezima	Kevkat

The Carlingford Stakes is a Listed flat horse race in Ireland open to thoroughbreds aged three years or older. It is run at Dundalk over a distance of 1 mile, 2 furlongs and 150 yards (2,149 metres), and it is scheduled to take place each year in October.

The race was first run in 2007.

== Winners ==
Year	Winner	Age	Jockey	Trainer	Time
2007	Red Moloney	3	Declan McDonogh	Kevin Prendergast	2:17.43
2008	Fiery Lad	3	Emmet McNamara	Ger Lyons	2:11.52
2009	Indiana Gal	4	Fran Berry	Patrick Martin	2:13.00
2010	Shimmering Moment	3	Chris Hayes	James J Hartnett	2:12.29
2011	Celebrity Sevi	3	Pat Smullen	Dermot Weld	2:12.30
2012	Paene Magnus	3	Kevin Manning	Jim Bolger	2:12.19
2013	Paene Magnus	4	Kevin Manning	Jim Bolger	2:14.80
2014	Chance To Dance	4	Kevin Manning	Jim Bolger	2:13.56
2015	Fire Fighting	4	Fran Berry	Mark Johnston	2:14.49
2016	Hawke	4	Pat Smullen	Johnny Murtagh	2:12.35
2017	Goldrush	3	Kevin Manning	Jim Bolger	2:13.84
2018	Global Giant	3	Gerald Mosse	Ed Dunlop	2:12.95

== See also ==
- Horse racing in Ireland
- List of Irish flat horse races
