= Hong Kong Mile =

Longines Hong Kong Mile
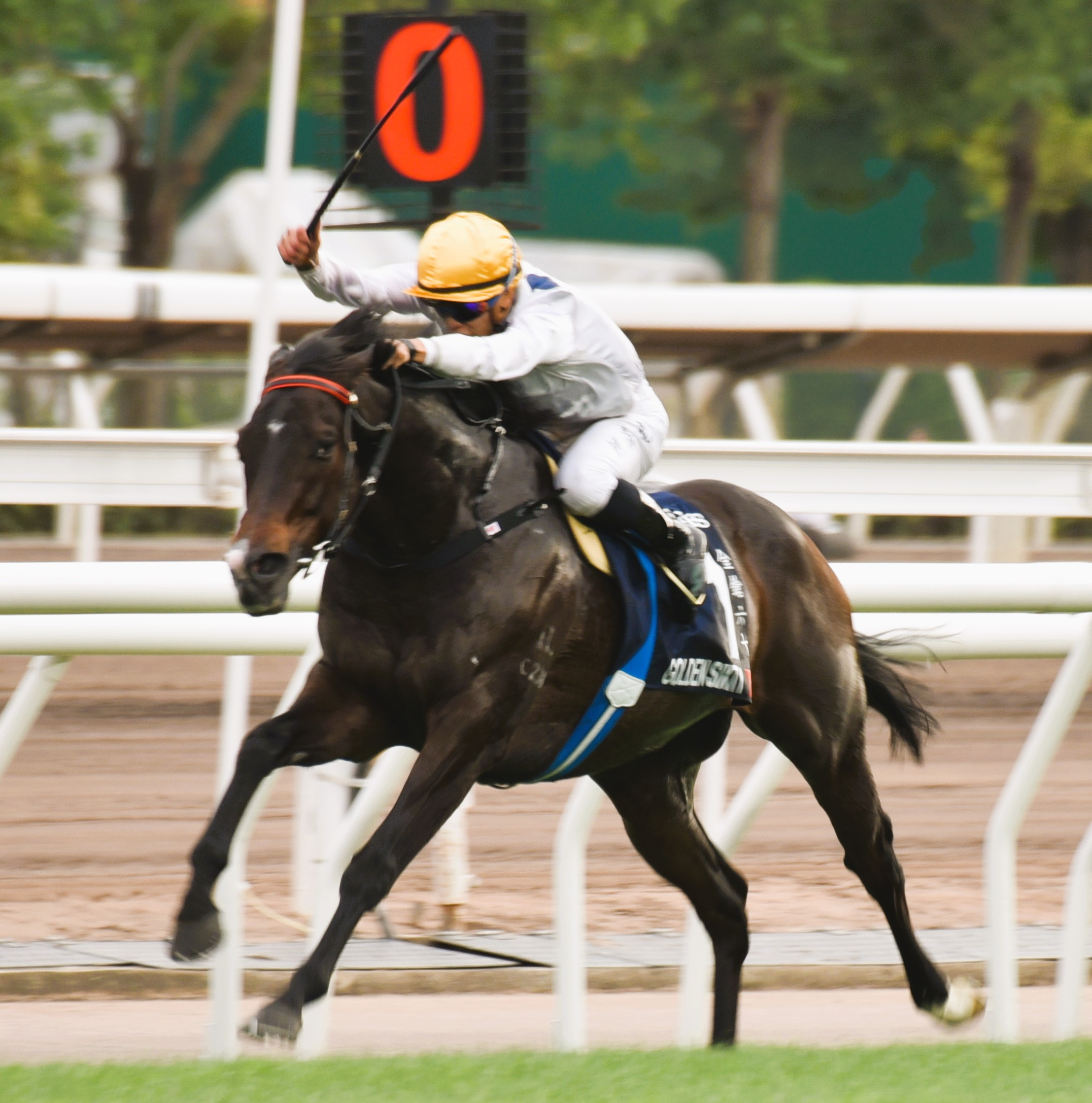
- Golden Sixty won the Hong Kong Mile race at the Hong Kong International Races 2023 raceday on 10 December 2023.
- Class: Group 1
- Location: Sha Tin Racecourse; Hong Kong
- Inaugurated: 1991
- Race type: Flat / Thoroughbred
- Sponsor: Longines
- Website: Hong Kong Jockey Club

Race information
- Distance: 1,600 metres (1 mile)
- Surface: Turf
- Track: Right-handed
- Qualification: Three-years-old and up
- Weight: 125 lb (3y); 126 lb (4y+); Allowances; 4 lb for fillies and mares
- Purse: HK$32,000,000 (2023); 1st: HK$17,920,000

The Hong Kong Mile is a Group 1 flat horse race in Hong Kong which is open to thoroughbreds aged three years or older. It is run over a distance of 1,600 metres (about 1 mile) at Sha Tin, taking place each year in mid-December.

The race was first run in 1991, and was originally titled the Hong Kong International Bowl. Its distance was initially set at 1,400 metres. The event's present title and distance were both introduced in 1999, and the following year it was promoted to Group 1 status.

The Hong Kong Mile is one of the four Hong Kong International Races, and it presently offers a purse of HK$32,000,000 (approximately US$4 million).

== Records ==
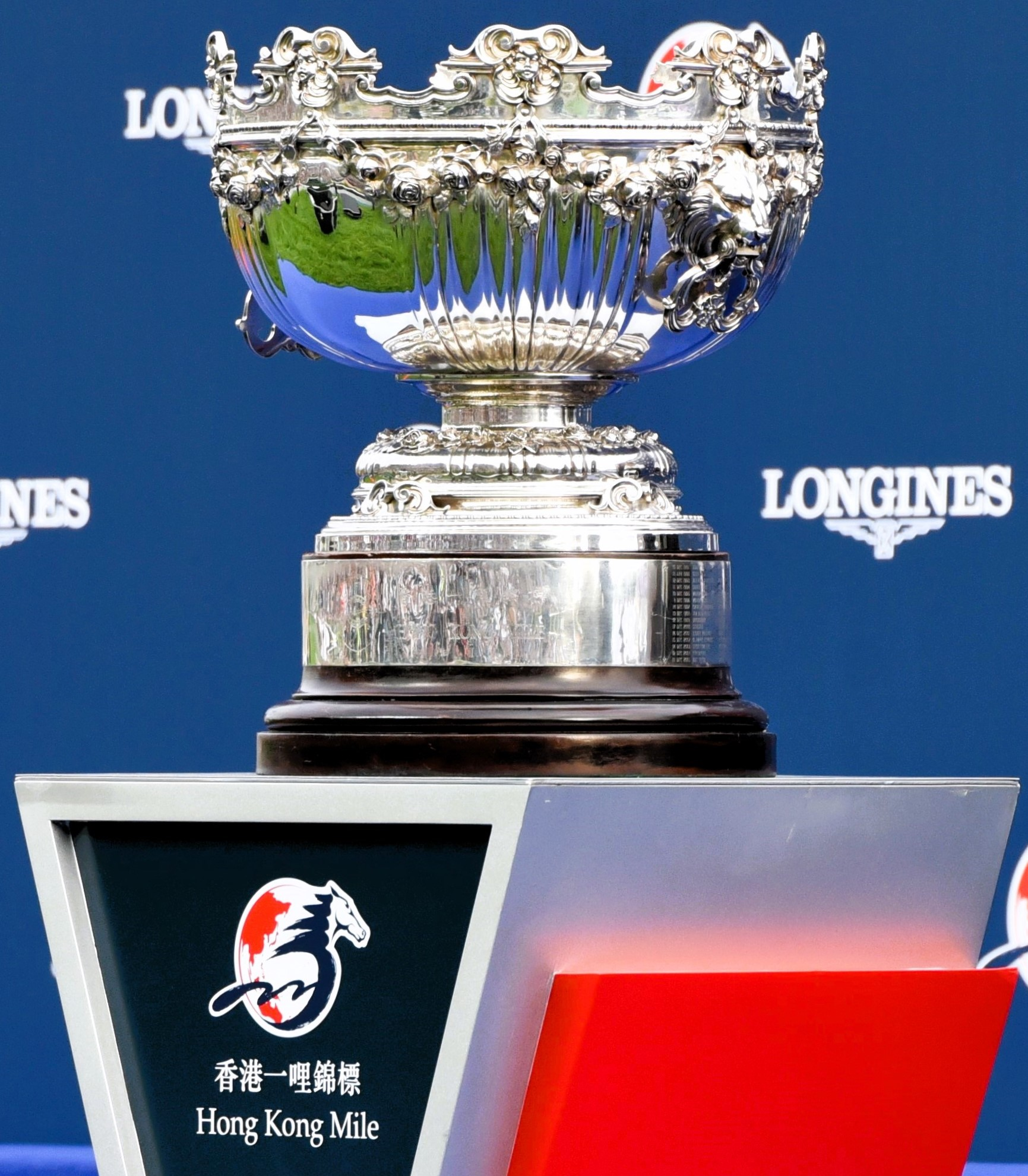
Trophy of the Hong Kong Mile

Speed record: (at present distance of 1,600 metres)

- 1:32.71 – Good Ba Ba (2008)

Most wins:

- 3 – Good Ba Ba (2007, 2008, 2009)
- 3 – Golden Sixty (2020, 2021, 2023)

Most wins by a jockey:

- 4 - Zac Purton (2012, 2016, 2018, 2022)
- 3 – Olivier Doleuze (2006, 2007, 2009)
- 3 - Vincent Ho Chak-yiu (2020, 2021, 2023)

Most wins by a trainer:

- 4 - John Moore (2011, 2014, 2017, 2018)
- 4 - Tony Cruz (2003, 2010, 2016, 2022)

Most wins by an owner:

- 3 – John Yuen Se Kit (2007, 2008, 2009)
- 3 – Stanley Chan Ka Leung (2020, 2021, 2023)

== Winners ==
Year	Winner	Age	Jockey	Trainer (Trained In)	Owner	Time
1991	Additional Risk	3	Michael Kinane	Dermot Weld (Ireland)	Moyglare Stud Farm	1:21.90
1992	Glen Kate ^{[1]}	6	Corey Black	Bill Shoemaker (USA)	McNall / Gretzky	1:22.20
1993	Winning Partners	5	Michael Kinane	Neville Begg (Hong Kong)	Justin Yue Kwok Hung et al.	1:22.60
1994	Soviet Line	4	Walter Swinburn	Michael Stoute (Great Britain)	Maktoum Al Maktoum	1:22.00
1995	Monopolize	5	Wayne Harris	Grahame Begg (Australia)	Neville Begg & Partners	1:21.50
1996	Monopolize	6	Darren Beadman	Grahame Begg (Australia)	Neville Begg & Partners	1:22.00
1997	Catalan Opening	5	Darren Beadman	Bart Cummings (Australia)	Dato Tan Chin Nam	1:22.00
1998	Jim and Tonic	4	Gérald Mossé	François Doumen (France)	Martin / Barby	1:21.70
1999	Docksider	4	Olivier Peslier	John Hills (Great Britain)	Gary A. Tanaka	1:34.70
2000	Sunline	5	Greg Childs	Trevor McKee (New Zealand)	Trevor McKee et al.	1:34.20
2001	Eishin Preston	4	Yuichi Fukunaga	Shuji Kitahashi (Japan)	Toyomitsu Hirai	1:34.80
2002	Olympic Express	4	Weichong Marwing	Ivan Allan (Hong Kong)	Larry Yung Chi Kin	1:34.90
2003	Lucky Owners	3	Felix Coetzee	Tony Cruz (Hong Kong)	Mr & Mrs Leung Kai Fai	1:34.30
2004	Firebreak	5	Frankie Dettori	Saeed bin Suroor (UAE)	Godolphin	1:34.60
2005	Hat Trick	4	Olivier Peslier	Katsuhiko Sumii (Japan)	Carrot Farm	1:34.80
2006	The Duke	6	Olivier Doleuze	Caspar Fownes (Hong Kong)	Eddie Yau Jr.	1:33.40
2007	Good Ba Ba	5	Olivier Doleuze	Andreas Schütz (Hong Kong)	John Yuen Se Kit	1:34.50
2008	Good Ba Ba	6	Christophe Soumillon	Andreas Schütz (Hong Kong)	John Yuen Se Kit	1:32.71
2009	Good Ba Ba	7	Olivier Doleuze	Derek Cruz (Hong Kong)	John Yuen Se Kit	1:34.60
2010	Beauty Flash	5	Gérald Mossé	Tony Cruz (Hong Kong)	Simon Kwok Siu Ming	1:34.79
2011	Able One	9	Jeff Lloyd	John Moore (Hong Kong)	Dr & Mrs Cornel Li Fook Kwan	1:33.98
2012	Ambitious Dragon	6	Zac Purton	Anthony T. Millard (Hong Kong)	Johnson Lam Pui Hung & Anderson Lam Hin Yue	1:34.12
2013	Glorious Days	6	Douglas Whyte	John Size (Hong Kong)	Tom Brown's Syndicate	1:33.60
2014	Able Friend	5	João Moreira	John Moore (Hong Kong)	Dr & Mrs Cornel Li Fook Kwan	1:33.49
2015	Maurice	4	Ryan Moore	Noriyuki Hori (Japan)	Kazumi Yoshida	1:33.92
2016	Beauty Only	5	Zac Purton	Tony Cruz (Hong Kong)	Eleanor Kwok Law Kwai Chun & Patrick Kwok Ho Chuen	1:33.48
2017	Beauty Generation	5	Derek Leung Ka-chun	John Moore (Hong Kong)	Patrick Kwok Ho Chuen	1:33.72
2018	Beauty Generation	6	Zac Purton	John Moore (Hong Kong)	Patrick Kwok Ho Chuen	1:33.52
2019	Admire Mars	3	Christophe Soumillon	Yasuo Tomomichi (Japan)	Riichi Kondo	1:33.25
2020	Golden Sixty	5	Vincent Ho Chak-yiu	Francis Lui Kin-wai (Hong Kong)	Stanley Chan Ka Leung	1:33.45
2021	Golden Sixty	6	Vincent Ho Chak-yiu	Francis Lui Kin-wai (Hong Kong)	Stanley Chan Ka Leung	1:33.86
2022	California Spangle	4	Zac Purton	Tony Cruz (Hong Kong)	Howard Liang Yum Shing	1:33.41
2023	Golden Sixty	8	Vincent Ho Chak-yiu	Francis Lui Kin-wai (Hong Kong)	Stanley Chan Ka Leung	1:34.14
2024	Voyage Bubble	6	James MacDonald	Ricky Yiu Poon-fai (Hong Kong)	Sunshine And Moonlight Syndicate	1:33.34
2025	Voyage Bubble	7	Zac Purton	Ricky Yiu Poon-fai (Hong Kong)	Sunshine And Moonlight Syndicate	1:33.47

^{1} The "1992" race actually took place in April 1993 – it had been postponed in December due to an equine virus.

== See also ==
- List of Hong Kong horse races
