= Honour and Glory =

American-bred Thoroughbred racehorse

- Sire: Relaunch
- Grandsire: In Reality
- Dam: Fair To All
- Damsire: Al Nasr
- Sex: Stallion
- Foaled: March 24, 1993
- Died: July 17, 2018 (aged 25)
- Country: United States
- Colour: Bay
- Breeder: Overbrook Farm
- Owner: Michael Tabor
- Trainer: D. Wayne Lukas
- Record: 17: 6-5-2
- Earnings: $1,202,942

Major wins
- Breeders' Futurity Stakes (1995); King's Bishop Stakes (1996); Metropolitan Handicap (1996); San Miguel Stakes (1996); San Rafael Stakes (1996)

Honour and Glory (foaled March 24, 1993 in Kentucky – July 17, 2018) was an American Thoroughbred racehorse who won important races during his career. He was bred by William T. Young's Overbrook Farm and purchased by British businessman and prominent racehorse owner, Michael Tabor.

Retired to stud in the United States, Honour and Glory sired a number of winners including the 2000 American Champion Two-Year-Old Filly, Caressing, winner of the 2000 Breeders' Cup Juvenile Fillies. The Leading First-Crop Sire of 2000, among his other American-born offspring, he sired Blues and Royals, winner of the 2005 UAE Derby.

Honour and Glory was sold to La Mission Stallion Station in Argentina. He stood in that country, where he notably sired 2008 UAE Derby winner, Honour Devil, and also at Wintergreen Stallion Station in Midway, Kentucky.

On July 17, 2018, it was announced that Honour and Glory had died due to complications of a broken femur.

== Sire line tree ==
- Honour and Glory
  - Put It Back
    - Black Bar Spin
    - In Summation
      - Calculator
    - Put Back the Shu
    - Smokey Stover
    - Nitido
    - Pirate Saint
    - Skypilot
    - Sol de Angra
    - Bal a Bali
      - Corner Office
      - Goa Gajah
    - Desjado Put
    - English Major
    - Noholdingback Bear
    - Fitzgerald
    - Flight Time
    - Garbo Talks
    - Glory Boy
    - Pimpers Paradise
  - Blues and Royals
  - Codigo de Honor
  - Cuestion de Honor
  - Honour Devil
  - Indio Glorioso
  - Mach Glory
