= Cavallerizzo =

Japanese racehorse

Cavallerizzo カヴァレリッツォ
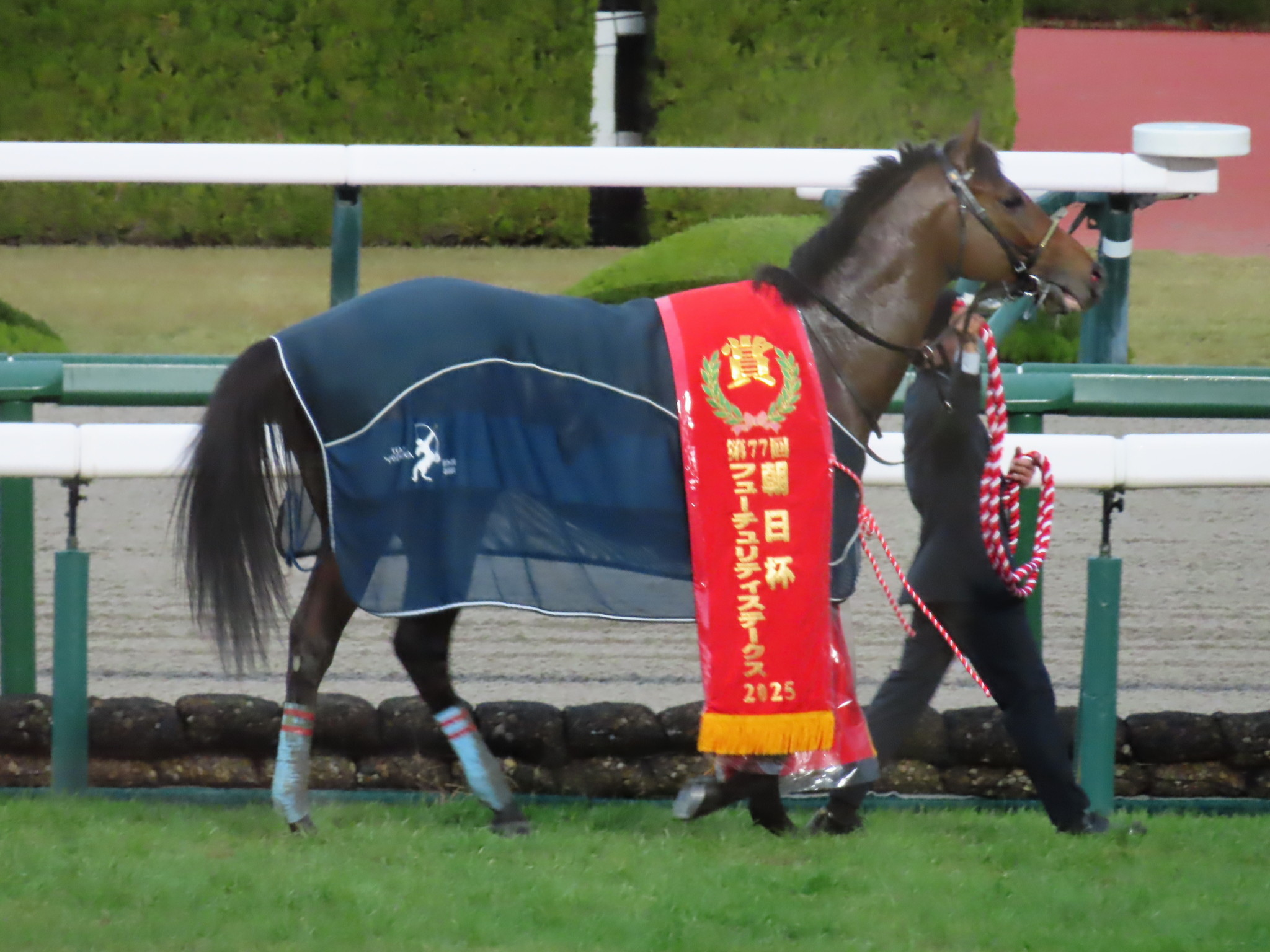
- Cavallerizzo after winning the 2025 Asahi Hai Futurity Stakes
- Sire: Saturnalia
- Grandsire: Lord Kanaloa
- Dam: Balladist
- Damsire: Heart's Cry
- Sex: Colt
- Foaled: February 28, 2023 (age 3)
- Country: Japan
- Color: Bay
- Breeder: Northern Farm
- Owner: Silk Racing Co., Ltd.
- Racing colours
- Trainer: Tatsuya Yoshioka
- Jockey: Cristian Demuro
- Record: 5:2-1-0
- Earnings: 93,624,000 JPY

Major wins
- Asahi Hai Futurity Stakes (2025)

Awards
- JRA Award for Best Two-Year-Old Colt (2025)
- Last updated on January 6, 2026

Cavallerizzo (Japanese: カヴァレリッツォ, Hepburn: Kavuarerittso; foaled February 28, 2023) is an active Japanese Thoroughbred racehorse best known for winning the 2025 Asahi Hai Futurity Stakes. At the end of his 2025 season, he was awarded with the JRA Award for Best Two-Year-Old Colt.

He was named after the Italian word "Cavallerizzo" which means "Horseman" in English.

== Background ==
On February 28, 2023, Cavallerizzo was born at Northern Farm in Abira, Hokkaido. He was syndicated in 2024, with Tatsuya Yoshioka as the intended trainer and a total offering price of 45 million yen (90,000 yen per share), offered by Silk Racing Co., Ltd. Before his debut, Yoshioka commented, “The horse is well put together and looks like he will produce a great deal of speed. Based on physical evaluation, I’d say he can probably run from a mile until 2,000 meters.”

== Racing career ==
=== 2025: two-year-old season ===
Cavallerizzo made his debut on August 31 at Chukyo Racecourse over a distance of 1,600 meters on turf, with Yuichi Kitamura booked as the jockey. He settled in midfield as the race progressed and quickly navigated through a group of horses in the final stretch, drawing five lengths clear and scoring his debut victory. Yuichi Kitamura commented, “He responds quickly. He’s got a good engine,” emphasizing a positive impression. Tatsuya Yoshioka looked back, saying, “He’s still rough around the edges, but he burst through a tight spot with his turn of foot.” On social media, comments such as “So strong it gave me chills” and “The first time I’ve been this excited in a while” were posted, and it was a performance that led to expectations of him as a leading Classic contender.

Cavallerizo was set to challenge the Daily Hai Nisai Stakes for his first graded stakes race. He contested the race in a new partnership with Cristian Demuro, who was in Japan on a short-term jockey license. When the race started, he was slow out of the gates and failed to settle, ending up racing from the rear of the field early. Nearing the third corner, he moved up to near the front of the field and kept his positioning through the fourth corner. Entering the stretch, he broke through from the inside, but he was unable to win the hard-fought battle with Admire Quads, who came with a furious late charge even further inside, and was defeated by a head, finishing second. Cristian Demuro commented, “I sent him to the inside and had him run under cover. In the straight he had a good turn of foot, but once he drew alongside the other horse at the finish there was a point where he wanted to drift out. I think he needs to grow mentally,” pointing out an area for development.

On December 1, Cavallerizzo's camp announced that he would take on the Asahi Hai Futurity Stakes. After his final workout, Yoshioka said, “We wanted to check his mental side and he was good,” and “Even at a time of day when the track condition was poor, he came back looking no different than usual. I only saw him through the monitor, but his balance looked good as well,” conveying a positive mood. On December 21, on the day of the race, in a wide-open betting situation, he went off as the second favorite behind Admire Quads. During the race he stayed on the inside in mid-division and went into the stretch in that position. When he found a path along the innermost rail, he went past the front-running Diamond Knot just before the finish and achieved his first graded stakes and grade one victory. This was also the first grade one stakes victory for a progeny of Saturnalia. Cristian Demuro praised him, saying, “I figured some space will open up in the inside. He was making a good run entering the stretch. Once we went up fairly close to the front, Christophe Lemaire’s horse (Diamond Knot) was showing a good turn of foot, so I was a little worried about whether we could catch him, but in the end the horse really tried hard and caught him firmly.” Yoshioka, for his part, said, “He’s easy to handle and doesn’t cause any trouble. In that respect he’s similar, and his speed also comes from his sire,” pointing to the elements inherited from Saturnalia, whom he had looked after in his days as an assistant trainer, and added, “He should manage up to 2,000 meters as well as long has he keeps calm. The way he can properly correct his issues even in a short time makes me feel his potential,” expressing his hopes for further development.

=== 2026: three-year-old season ===
Cavallerizzo would have made his season debut at the Satsuki Sho in April. This time he would be ridden by Damian Lane. He was the third favorite before the race started. As the race progress, the horse secured a good position came into the final phase of the race. When he reached the final straight, he faltered and slowed down to the line which ended up in 13th-place. Lane commented that he used all his energy for the positioning which causing him to lost the ground at the final straight. He also said that 2000 metres distance might too long for him.

His next race was NHK Mile Cup where he partnered jockey Atsuya Nishimura, who recently finished fifth in the Kentucky Derby with Danon Bourbon, for the first time. With Nishimura jockey aboard Cavallerizzo he clocked 58,9 seconds for four furlongs at Ritto Training Center on the 6th May. Even while facing the challenge of a short two week break after Satsuki Sho and transportation to Tokyo his trainer said with confidence, "Tokyo's 1600 meters is a course where there's nowhere to hide and the best horse wins. As a two-year-old champion, we want to produce a performance worthy of that title."

When the race started American-bred Yu Pharaoh took the early lead and set the pace. Cavallerizzo, who started as the fifth favorite, settled well at around seventh place and saved ground, while Happy Angel and New Zealand Trophy winner Reservation closely followed the leader. With about 200 meters left third favorite Diamond Knot quickly moved forward and took the lead. Sixth favorite Admire Quads who sat at around seventh, launched forward and overtook him in the final 100 meters. From around the fourth from behind, Rodeo Drive and slightly closer to the front Ask Ikigomi accelerated and begun rapidly closing on the leaders, gradually overtaking other horses one by one, and the two of them finished in close photo finish, where Rodeo Drive claimed victory by a margin of just a nose. Cavallerizzo was unable to show his usual finishing kick, and lost with margin of 1.3 seconds the from the winner Rodeo Drive, who is also sired by Saturnalia, and finished 12th. After the race Atsuya Nishimura commented on the race, saying, “He was a little too hyped up. I feel like that's why we lost.”

== Racing statistics ==
Below data is based on data available on JBIS Search, and NetKeiba.

Date	Track	Race	Grade	Distance (Condition)	Entry	HN	Odds (Favored)	Finish	Time	Margins	Jockey	Winner (Runner-up)
2025 – two-year-old season
Aug 31	Chukyo	2YO Debut		1,600 m (Firm)	14	8	3.0 (1)	1st	1:34.2	-0.8	Yuichi Kitamura	(Taisei Astro)
Nov 15	Kyoto	Daily Hai 2YOS	GII	1,600 m (Firm)	8	7	2.6 (2)	2nd	1:33.1	0.0	Cristian Demuro	Admire Quads
Dec 21	Hanshin	Asahi Hai FS	GI	1,600 m (Yielding)	14	8	3.6 (2)	1st	1:33.2	-0.1	Cristian Demuro	(Diamond Knot)
2026 – third-year-old season
Apr 19	Nakayama	Satsuki Sho	GI	2,000 m (Firm)	18	1	6.1 (3)	13th	1:57.6	1.1	Damian Lane	Lovcen
May 10	Tokyo	NHK Mile Cup	GI	1,600 m (Firm)	18	4	9.3 (5)	12th	1:32.4	1.3	Atsuya Nishimura	Rodeo Drive

Legend:
Turf

== Pedigree ==
Pedigree of Cavallerizzo (JPN), Bay colt, 2023
Sire Saturnalia dk. b. 2016	Lord Kanaloa b. 2008	King Kamehameha	Kingmambo (USA)
Sire Saturnalia dk. b. 2016	Lord Kanaloa b. 2008	King Kamehameha	Manfath (IRE)
Sire Saturnalia dk. b. 2016	Lord Kanaloa b. 2008	Lady Blossom	Storm Cat (USA)
Sire Saturnalia dk. b. 2016	Lord Kanaloa b. 2008	Lady Blossom	Saratoga Dew (USA)
Sire Saturnalia dk. b. 2016	Cesario blk. 2002	Special Week	Sunday Silence (USA)
Sire Saturnalia dk. b. 2016	Cesario blk. 2002	Special Week	Campaign Girl
Sire Saturnalia dk. b. 2016	Cesario blk. 2002	Kirov Premiere (GB)	Sadler's Wells (USA)
Sire Saturnalia dk. b. 2016	Cesario blk. 2002	Kirov Premiere (GB)	Querida (IRE)
Dam Balladist dk. b. 2016	Heart's Cry b. 2001	Sunday Silence (USA)	Halo
Dam Balladist dk. b. 2016	Heart's Cry b. 2001	Sunday Silence (USA)	Wishing Well
Dam Balladist dk. b. 2016	Heart's Cry b. 2001	Irish Dance	Tony Bin (IRE)
Dam Balladist dk. b. 2016	Heart's Cry b. 2001	Irish Dance	Buper Dance (USA)
Dam Balladist dk. b. 2016	Balada Sale (ARG) b. 2008	Not For Sale	Parade Marshal (USA)
Dam Balladist dk. b. 2016	Balada Sale (ARG) b. 2008	Not For Sale	Love for Sale
Dam Balladist dk. b. 2016	Balada Sale (ARG) b. 2008	La Balada	Confidential Talk (USA)
Dam Balladist dk. b. 2016	Balada Sale (ARG) b. 2008	La Balada	La Baraca (Family: 7)

- His second dam, Balada Sale, won the 2011 Gran Premio Seleccion (Argentine Oaks) (G1), Gran Premio Polla de Potrancas (Argentine 1000 Guineas (G1), and Clásico General Luis María Campos (G2). Her progeny include Satono Flag, who won the 2020 Yayoi Sho (G2) and Satono Reinas, 2nd in the Hanshin Juvenile Fillies and Oka Sho.
- His fourth dam, La Baraca, won six Argentine graded stakes races, including the 1994 Gran Premio Estrellas Sprint (G1). Her offspring include La Belga (Clásico Eliseo Ramírez).
- Other close relatives include Kalamantianos (second in the Kyodo Tsushin Hai), Laima (Clásico Carlos Tomkinson), Le Blues (Gran Premio Polla de Potrillos), Miss Bamba (Gran Premio Estrellas Juvenile Fillies, among others), and Bamba Jane (Clásico Saturnino J. Unzué).
