= Rodeo Drive (horse) =

Japanese racehorse

Rodeo Drive ロデオドライブ
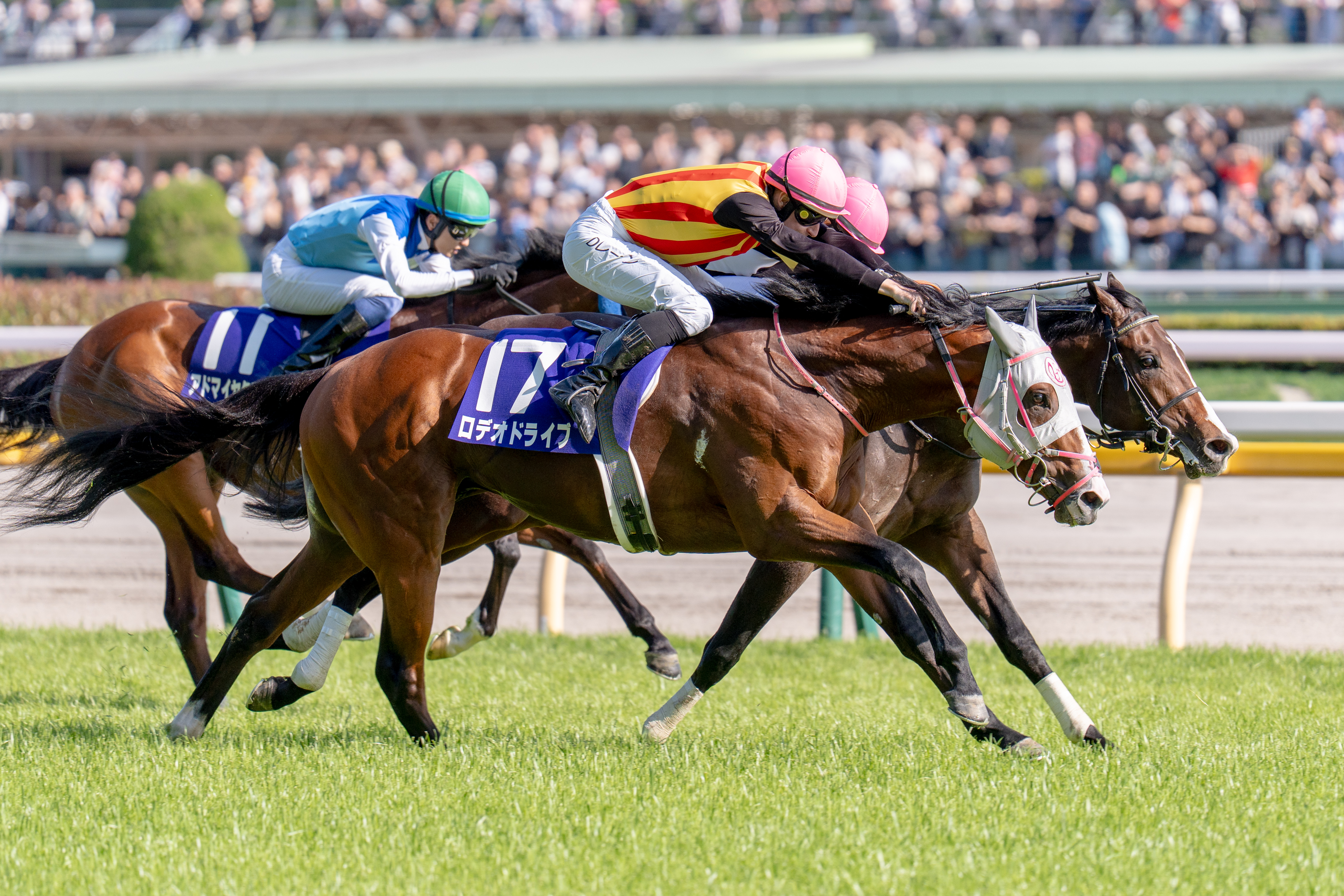
- Rodeo Drive (17) at 2026 NHK Mile Cup
- Breed: Thoroughbred
- Sire: Saturnalia
- Grandsire: Lord Kanaloa
- Dam: Beverly Hills
- Damsire: Snitzel
- Sex: Colt
- Foaled: March 21, 2023 (age 3)
- Country: Japan
- Color: Bay
- Breeder: Northern Farm
- Owner: Katsumi Yoshida
- Racing colours
- Trainer: Tetsuhide Tsuji
- Record: 6: 3-2-0
- Earnings: 188,940,000 JPY

Major wins
- NHK Mile Cup (2026)
- Last updated on August 30, 2026

Rodeo Drive (Japanese: ロデオドライブ, Hepburn: Rodeo Doraibu; foaled March 21, 2023) is an active Japanese Thoroughbred racehorse best known for winning the 2026 NHK Mile Cup.

He was named after the luxury shopping street Rodeo Drive, located in Beverly Hills, California, which his dam was named from.

== Racing career ==
=== 2025: two-year-old season ===
Rodeo Drive made his debut on December 21 at Nakayama Racecourse over a distance of 1,600 meters on turf, with Hiroshi Kitamura riding. Coming out from the widest gate, he settled upfront early, sitting just behind the leader. In the final stretch, he overtook the leading horse and went on to win by three-fourths of a length.

=== 2026: three-year-old season ===
Rodeo Drive began his three-year-old season in a three-year-old allowance race over the same track and distance as his debut, with Akihide Tsumura aboard him this time. Right after the start, he settled just behind the leaders as his last race. Turning to the final stretch, he peeled off quickly from the horse in front of him and overtook the leading group to win by three lengths.

For his next race, he was pointed to the New Zealand Trophy, which would also be his first graded stakes race. He went off the gates as the most favored horse to win, settling right behind the leaders yet again. On the final stretch, he chased after Reservation who was upfront but was unable to close him in time. He finished in second place.

On April 15, his connections announced that he would take on the NHK Mile Cup on May 10 at Tokyo Racecourse. This would be his first grade one stakes challenge. With Damian Lane in the saddle, he started as the favorite. Contrary to his previous races, he settled near the back of the pack early on and stayed there until the final stretch, where he tracked the Churchill Downs Cup winner, Ask Ikigomi, who was also speeding past the rest of the pack right in front of him in the middle of the track. The battle continued until they crossed the finish line with Rodeo Drive edging the win by a nose to Ask Ikigomi on a photo finish, capturing his first graded stakes title.

After winning the race Damian Lane said with smile:

"Honestly, it's hard to find the words right now, but in one phrase, I'm very, very happy. We were able to show this horse at his best. I expected the pace to be strong, but I was able to get him good cover during the race. He's still a young horse, but I believe he has the ability to compete at G1 level going forward." Original text:「正直、あまり言葉が出てこないですけど、とてもハッピーです。この馬のベストパフォーマンスを見せることができてホッとしています。いいリズムで進められたし、しまいにいい脚を見せられると自信を持っていた。能力がG1クラスという証明もできて、今後もG1でいいレースができると思う」

It was not only first graded stakes win for Rodeo Drive and not only first NHK Mile Cup and seventh G1 in JRA for Damian Lane but also a first G1 for Rodeo Drive's trainer, Tetsuhide Tsuji. He was rested for three months before joining the Niigata Kinen in August. This was an attempt by Tsuji for the horse to acclimate himself to longer-distance races. When the race started, Rodeo Drive sat in the middle position. Halfway down the final straight, he was blocked by other horses before making a move to the outside with about one furlong from the line. He ended up losing the race at the line by a head behind Zoroastro. Christophe Lemaire, who was his jockey, stated that the horse was calm throughout the race despite the slow pace. He also praised the horse performance that day even with lack of space given in the final straight. Few days after the race, he was diagnosed with the inflammation of suspensory ligaments in his right foreleg as he was scheduled to return to Northern Farm.

== Racing statistics ==
Below data is based on data available on JBIS Search, and NetKeiba.

Date	Track	Race	Grade	Distance (Condition)	Entry	HN	Odds (Favored)	Finish	Time	Margins	Jockey	Winner (Runner-up)
2025 – two-year-old season
Dec 21	Nakayama	2YO Debut		1,600 m (Yielding)	16	16	8.4 (5)	1st	1:35.1	-0.2	Hiroshi Kitamura	(Canal Saint Martin)
2026 – three-year-old season
Mar 1	Nakayama	3YO Allowance	1W	1,600 m (Firm)	12	10	2.8 (2)	1st	1:32.1	-0.5	Akihide Tsumura	(Spe Luce)
Apr 11	Nakayama	New Zealand Trophy	GII	1,600 m (Firm)	15	7	1.7 (2)	2nd	1:33.3	0.0	Akihide Tsumura	Reservation
May 10	Tokyo	NHK Mile Cup	GI	1,600 m (Firm)	18	17	4.6 (1)	1st	1:31.5	0.0	Damian Lane	(Ask Ikigomi)
Aug 30	Niigata	Niigata Kinen	GIII	2,000 m (Good)	11	3	3.7 (3)	2nd	1:59.6	0.0	Christophe Lemaire	Zoroastro
Nov 22	Kyoto	Mile Championship	GI	1,600 m (Firm)	18	8	5.6 (2)	7th	1:32.3	0.5	Joao Moreira	Erdenali

Legend:
Turf

== Pedigree ==
Pedigree of Rodeo Drive (JPN), Bay colt, 2023
Sire Saturnalia dk. b. 2016	Lord Kanaloa b. 2008	King Kamehameha	Kingmambo (USA)
Sire Saturnalia dk. b. 2016	Lord Kanaloa b. 2008	King Kamehameha	Manfath (IRE)
Sire Saturnalia dk. b. 2016	Lord Kanaloa b. 2008	Lady Blossom	Storm Cat (USA)
Sire Saturnalia dk. b. 2016	Lord Kanaloa b. 2008	Lady Blossom	Saratoga Dew (USA)
Sire Saturnalia dk. b. 2016	Cesario blk. 2002	Special Week	Sunday Silence (USA)
Sire Saturnalia dk. b. 2016	Cesario blk. 2002	Special Week	Campaign Girl
Sire Saturnalia dk. b. 2016	Cesario blk. 2002	Kirov Premiere (GB)	Sadler's Wells (USA)
Sire Saturnalia dk. b. 2016	Cesario blk. 2002	Kirov Premiere (GB)	Querida (IRE)
Dam Beverly Hills ch. 2012	Snitzel (AUS) b. 2002	Redoute's Choice	Danehill (USA)
Dam Beverly Hills ch. 2012	Snitzel (AUS) b. 2002	Redoute's Choice	Shantha's Choice
Dam Beverly Hills ch. 2012	Snitzel (AUS) b. 2002	Snippets' Lass	Snippets
Dam Beverly Hills ch. 2012	Snitzel (AUS) b. 2002	Snippets' Lass	Snow Finch (IRE)
Dam Beverly Hills ch. 2012	Brilliant Very ch. 1990	Northern Taste (CAN)	Northern Dancer
Dam Beverly Hills ch. 2012	Brilliant Very ch. 1990	Northern Taste (CAN)	Lady Victoria
Dam Beverly Hills ch. 2012	Brilliant Very ch. 1990	Crafty Wife (USA)	Crafty Prospector
Dam Beverly Hills ch. 2012	Brilliant Very ch. 1990	Crafty Wife (USA)	Wife Mistress (Family 9-a)

- Rodeo Drive is related to Company, who won the 2009 Tennō Shō (Autumn) and 2009 Mile Championship, through his granddam Brilliant Very. Leningrad (2004 Copa Republica Argentina) and Historical (2012 Mainichi Hai) also were from Brilliant Very.
- Rodeo Drive is also related to Big Taste, who won the 2023 Nakayama Grand Jump, Tosen Jordan, who won the 2011 Tennō Shō (Autumn), Tosen Stardom, who won the 2017 Toorak Handicap and 2017 Champions Stakes, as well as Tastiera, who won the 2023 Tōkyō Yūshun and 2025 Queen Elizabeth II Cup, through his great-granddam Crafty Wife. Big Shiori (1995 Yomiuri Milers Cup) and Tosen Homareboshi (2012 Kyoto Shimbun Hai) also were from Crafty Wife.
