= Saturnalia (horse) =

Japanese-bred Thoroughbred racehorse

Saturnalia サートゥルナーリア
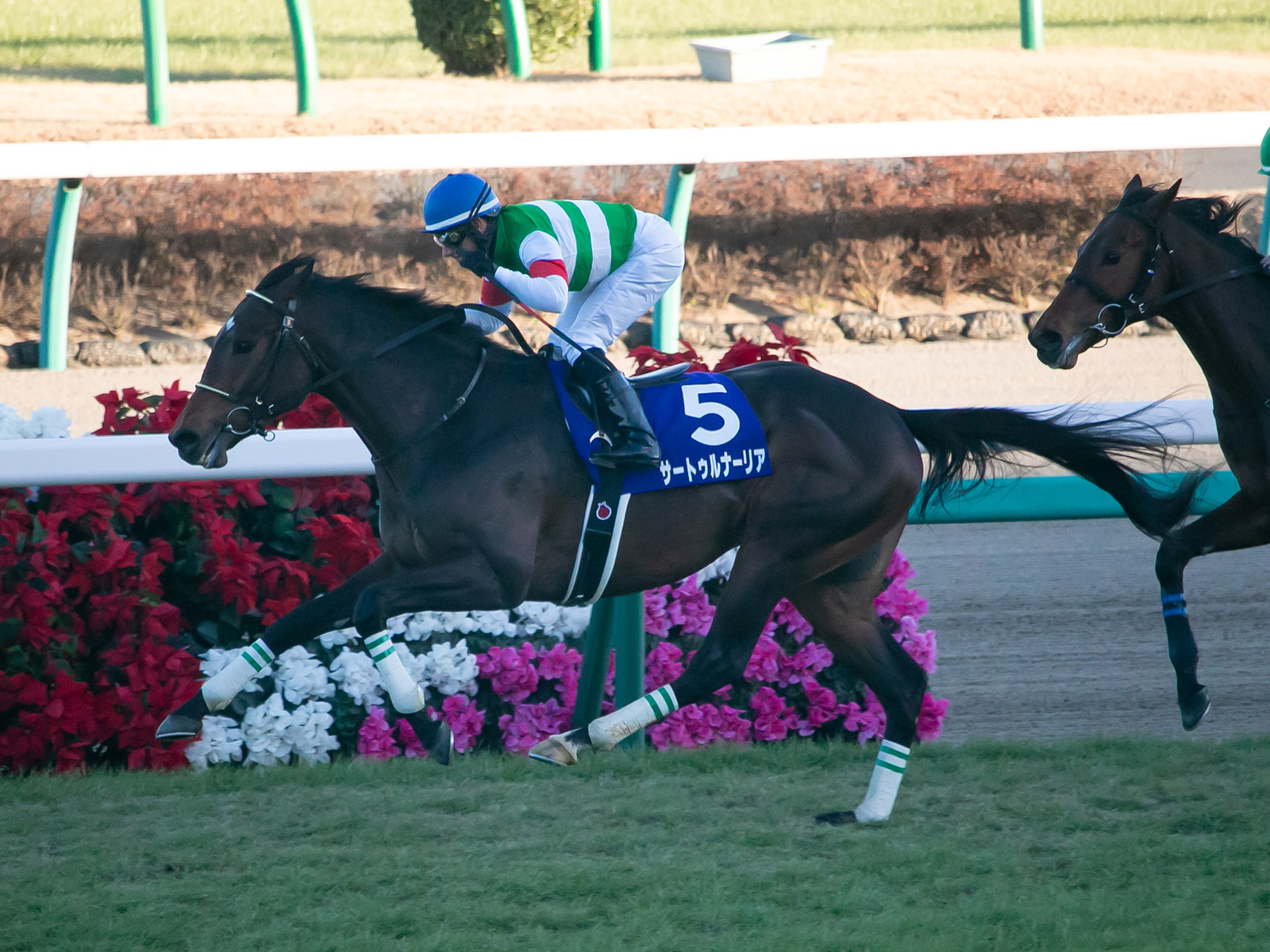
- Saturnalia racing at the 2018 Hopeful Stakes.
- Breed: Thoroughbred
- Sire: Lord Kanaloa
- Grandsire: King Kamehameha
- Dam: Cesario
- Damsire: Special Week
- Sex: Stallion
- Foaled: March 21, 2016 (age 10)
- Country: Japan
- Colour: Dark bay or brown
- Breeder: Northern Farm
- Owner: U Carrot Farm
- Racing colours
- Trainer: Kazuya Nakatake; Katsuhiko Sumii.
- Jockey: Mirco Demuro; Christophe Lemaire
- Record: 10: 6-1-0
- Earnings: ¥523,585,000

Major wins
- Hopeful Stakes (2018); Kobe Shimbun Hai (2019); Kinko Sho (2020); Japanese Classic Race wins: Satsuki Sho (2019)

Awards
- JRA Award for Best Three-Year-Old Colt (2019)

Saturnalia (Japanese: サートゥルナーリア, Hepburn: Sāturunāria; foaled 21 March 2016) is a retired Japanese Thoroughbred racehorse and active sire. In 2018 he was rated the second-best two-year-old in Japan, as he was undefeated in three starts including the Grade 1 Hopeful Stakes on his final appearance of the season. On his three-year-old debut he added another Grade 1 success as he took the Satsuki Sho but was beaten when odds-on favourite for the Tokyo Yushun. Later in the year he won the Kobe Shimbun Hai and finished second in the Arima Kinen.

== Background ==
Saturnalia is a dark bay or brown horse with a white star bred in Japan by Northern Farm. During his racing career he was owned by U Carrot Farm. The colt was sent into training with Katsuhiko Sumii.

Saturnalia was from the second crop of foals sired by Lord Kanaloa, an outstanding sprinter-miler who was voted Japanese Horse of the Year in 2013. Saturnalia's dam Cesario was a top-class racemare won the Yushun Himba and the American Oaks and went on to produce the Japan Cup winner Epiphaneia and the Asahi Hai Futurity Stakes winner Leontes. As a fourth-generation descendant of the Epsom Oaks winner Pia, Cesario was related to other major winners, including Chief Singer and Pleasantly Perfect.

== Racing career ==
=== 2018: two-year-old season ===
Saturnalia began his racing career in a maiden race over 1600 metres at Hanshin Racecourse on 10 June 2018 and won from Deep Diver and seven others. After a break of more than four months, the colt returned for the Listed Hagi Stakes over 1800 metres at Kyoto Racecourse on 27 October and won again, beating Jamil Fuerte and six others. When Sumii was banned from training horses after a drunk driving conviction Saturnalia's conditioning was handled by Kazuya Nakatake.

On 28 December, Saturnalia was stepped up in class to contest the Grade 1 Hopeful Stakes over 2000 metres at Nakayama Racecourse. Ridden by Mirco Demuro, he was made the 0.8/1 favourite ahead of twelve opponents including the Tokyo Sports Hai Nisai Stakes winner Nishino Daisy. After racing in second place behind the front-running Cosmo Calendula, Saturnalia produced a strong run in the straight, took the lead in the closing stages and won by one and a half lengths from Admire Justa, with third place going to Nishino Daisy. After the race Demuro said "I feel great. I knew I was riding the strongest two-year-old of the season. He really showed his strength though squeezing his way through the narrow opening. I am really looking forward to his three-year-old season".

In the official ratings for Japanese two-year-olds Saturnalia was rated the second best juvenile of the year, one pound behind the Asahi Hai Futurity Stakes winner Admire Mars. In January 2019 Saturnalia finished second to Admire Mars in the polling for the Best Two-Year-Old Colt at the JRA Awards for 2018 receiving 123 votes against his rival's 153.

=== 2019: three-year-old season ===
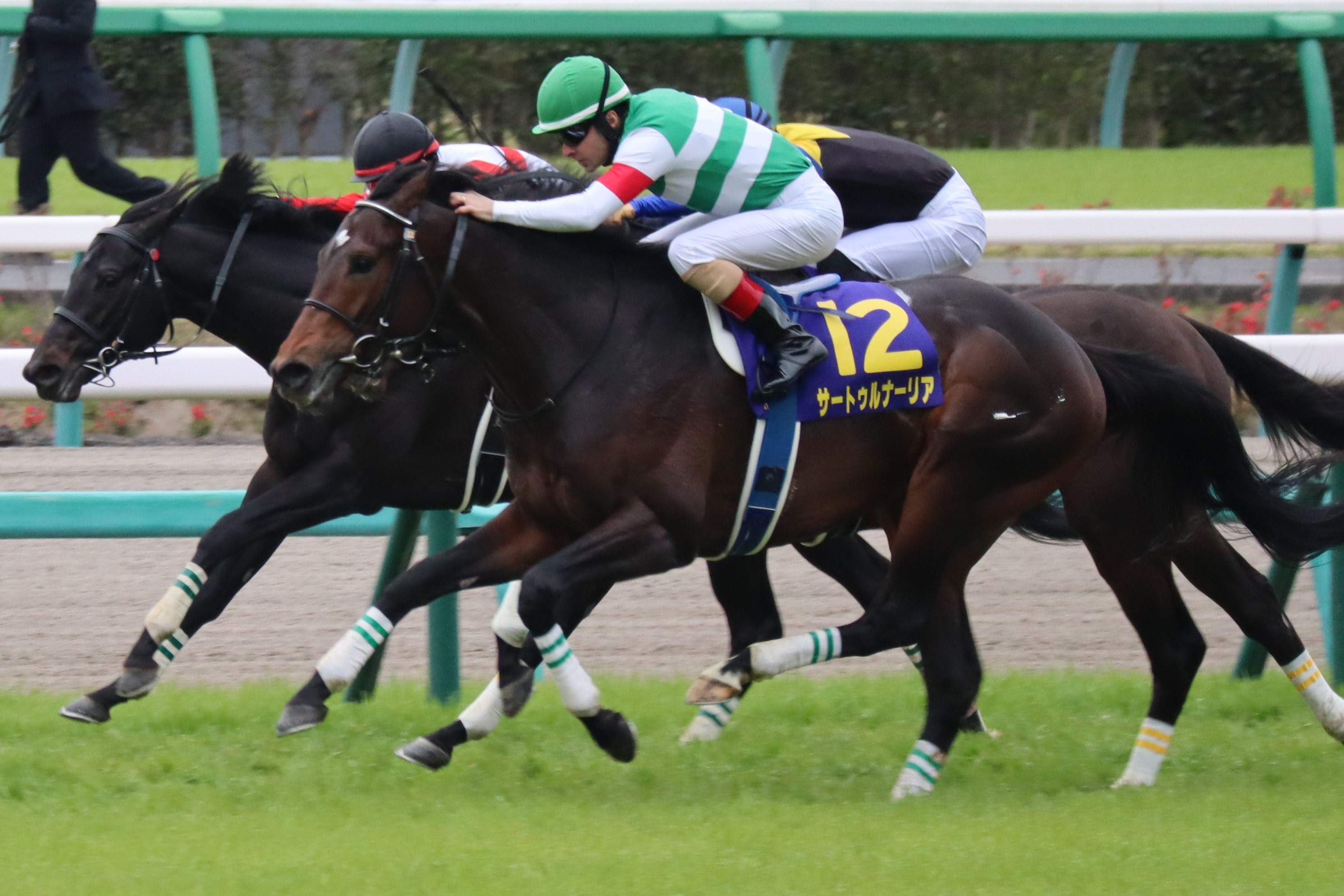
Saturnalia wins the 79th Satsuki Sho

Saturnalia moved back to the stable of Katsuhiko Sumii for the 2019 season. For his first run of the season the colt contested the Grade 1 Satsuki Sho, the first leg of the Japanese Triple Crown over 2000 metres at Nakayama on 14 April. In the run-up to the race his assistant trainer Yasuyuki Tsujino said "Things have been fine with him, his breathing's good, and he's run well in training with control and power... He's come along very well, and I don’t think he's been fully extended." Ridden for the first time by Christophe Lemaire he was made the 0.7/1 favourite ahead of Admire Mars in an eighteen-runner field which included Velox, Danon Kingly, Fantasist (Keio Hai Nisai Stakes) and Meisho Tengen (Yayoi Sho). After racing in mid-division in the early stages, Saturnalia moved forward on the final turn and made a strong challenge in the straight taking the lead from Velox 200 metres from the finish. Velox rallied, while Danon Kingly produced a strong run up the inside rail but Saturnalia prevailed by a head and a nose. After the race Lemaire said "I rode him for the first time in the race but I had confidence in him. He seemed a bit nervous and drifted towards the inside when we took command before the crowd. His condition was not 100% as it was his first start this year but he should be in top condition going into the Japanese Derby."

On 26 May Saturnalia started the 0.6/1 favourite against seventeen opponents for the Tokyo Yushun over 2400 metres and was ridden by Damian Lane. After racing in eleventh place for most of the way he made rapid progress in the straight but never looked likely to catch the leaders and came home fourth behind Roger Barows, Danon Kingly and Velox, beaten three and a quarter lengths by the winner.

After an absence of almost four months Saturnalia returned in the Kobe Shinbun Hai over 2400 metres at Hanshin on 22 September and started the odds-on favourite in an eight-runner field. Lemaire settled the colt in second place behind the front-running Sifflement before taking the lead in the straight. Saturnalia drew away in the closing stages to win by three lengths from Velox with a further length and a quarter back to World Premiere in third place. Lemaire commented "He showed his strength today. He needed a horse in front of him and he relaxed in the back straight. His start was no good in the Derby but it was good today. Looking forward to the future, I'm sure he's a super horse".

On 27 October Saturnalia faced older horses for the first time in the autumn edition of the Tenno Sho over 2000 metres at Tokyo and started the 2.4/1 second favourite in a sixteen-runner field. He raced in third place for most of the way before fading in the straight and coming home sixth behind Almond Eye. For his final run of the year Saturnalia was matched against older horses again in the Arima Kinen over 2500 metres at Nakayama on 22 December. He raced towards the rear of the field before staying on strongly in the straight to take second place behind the five-year-old mare and fellow U Carrot Farm runner Lys Gracieux.

In January 2020, at the JRA Awards for 2019, Saturnalia was voted Best Three-Year-Old Colt, beating Admire Mars by 124 votes to 107.

=== 2020: four-year-old season ===
On his first run as a four-year-old, Saturnalia started the odds-on favourite for the Grade 2 Kinko Sho over 2000 metres at Chukyo Racecourse on 15 March when his ten rivals included Lord My Way (Challenge Cup), Last Draft (Keisei Stakes) and Nishino Daisy. He settled in fifth place before moving up on the outside in the straight, taking the lead inside the last 100 metres and winning by two lengths from the 40/1 outsider Satono Saltus. At Hanshin 28 June Saturnalia was made the 1.4/1 favourite for the 61st edition of the Grade 1 Takarazuka Kinen over 2200 metres. He raced towards the rear along the inside rail before being switched to the outside in the straight but despite making steady progress he was unable to threaten the leaders and came home fourth behind Chrono Genesis, Kiseki and Mozu Bello.

Shortly after this race, Saturnalia retired and assigned for a stud duty. In the 2020 World's Best Racehorse Rankings, Saturnalia was rated on 120, making him the equal 40th best racehorse in the world.

== Racing form ==
The data available is based on JBIS and netkeiba.com.

Date	Track	Race	Grade	Distance (Condition)	Entry	HN	Odds (Favored)	Finish	Time	Margins	Jockey	Winner (Runner-up)
2018 – two-year-old season
Jun 10	Hanshin	2yo Newcomer		1,600 m (Firm)	9	5	1.1 (1)	1st	1:37.2	–0.2	Mirco Demuro	(Deep Diver)
Oct 27	Kyoto	Hagi Stakes	OP	1,800 m (Firm)	7	1	1.2 (1)	1st	1:49.6	–0.3	Mirco Demuro	(Jamil Fuerte)
Dec 28	Nakayama	Hopeful Stakes	1	2,000 m (Firm)	13	5	1.8 (1)	1st	2:01.6	–0.2	Mirco Demuro	(Admire Justa)
2019 – three-year-old season
Apr 14	Nakayama	Satsuki Sho	1	2,000 m (Firm)	18	12	1.7 (1)	1st	1:58.1	0.0	Christophe Lemaire	(Velox)
May 26	Tokyo	Tokyo Yushun	1	2,400 m (Firm)	18	6	1.6 (1)	4th	2:23.1	0.5	Damian Lane	Roger Barows
Sep 22	Hanshin	Kobe Shimbun Hai	2	2,400 m (Firm)	8	3	1.4 (1)	1st	2:26.8	–0.5	Christophe Lemaire	(Velox)
Oct 27	Tokyo	Tenno Sho (Autumn)	1	2,000 m (Firm)	16	10	3.4 (2)	6th	1:57.1	0.9	Christophe Soumillon	Almond Eye
Dec 22	Nakayama	Arima Kinen	1	2,500 m (Firm)	16	10	7.8 (3)	2nd	2:31.3	0.8	Christophe Soumillon	Lys Gracieux
2020 – four-year-old season
Mar 15	Chukyo	Kinko Sho	2	2,000 m (Firm)	12	6	1.3 (1)	1st	2:01.6	–0.3	Christophe Lemaire	(Satono Saltus)
Jun 28	Hanshin	Takarazuka Kinen	1	2,200 m (Good)	18	5	2.4 (1)	4th	2:15.6	2.1	Christophe Lemaire	Chrono Genesis

Legend:
Turf

== Stud record ==
Saturnalia started his stud duty in 2021 at Shadai Stallion Station for a fee of 6,000,000 JPY. From his second crop of foals, he sired his first grade one stakes winner, Cavallerizzo, who won the Asahi Hai Futurity Stakes.

=== Notable progeny ===
Below data is based on JBIS Stallion Reports.

c = colt, f = filly, g = gelding
bold = grade 1 stakes

Foaled	Name	Sex	Major Wins
2022	Fandom	c	Mainichi Hai
2022	Flicker Jab	c	Kitakyushu Kinen, Centaur Stakes
2022	Shohei	c	Kyoto Shimbun Hai, American Jockey Club Cup
2023	Cavallerizzo	c	**Asahi Hai Futurity Stakes**
2023	Festival Hill	f	Fantasy Stakes
2023	Justin Vista	g	Kyoto Nisai Stakes
2023	Rodeo Drive	c	**NHK Mile Cup**
2024	Brad Barows	c	Daily Hai Nisai Stakes

== Pedigree ==
Pedigree of Saturnalia (JPN), dark bay or brown colt, 2016
Sire Lord Kanaloa (JPN) 2008	King Kamehameha; 2001	Kingmambo (USA)	Mr. Prospector
Sire Lord Kanaloa (JPN) 2008	King Kamehameha; 2001	Kingmambo (USA)	Miesque
Sire Lord Kanaloa (JPN) 2008	King Kamehameha; 2001	Manfath (IRE)	Last Tycoon
Sire Lord Kanaloa (JPN) 2008	King Kamehameha; 2001	Manfath (IRE)	Pilot Bird (GB)
Sire Lord Kanaloa (JPN) 2008	Lady Blossom; 1996	Storm Cat (USA)	Storm Bird (CAN)
Sire Lord Kanaloa (JPN) 2008	Lady Blossom; 1996	Storm Cat (USA)	Terlingua
Sire Lord Kanaloa (JPN) 2008	Lady Blossom; 1996	Saratoga Dew (USA)	Cormorant
Sire Lord Kanaloa (JPN) 2008	Lady Blossom; 1996	Saratoga Dew (USA)	Super Luna
Dam Cesario (JPN) 2002	Special Week; 1995	Sunday Silence (USA)	Halo
Dam Cesario (JPN) 2002	Special Week; 1995	Sunday Silence (USA)	Wishing Well
Dam Cesario (JPN) 2002	Special Week; 1995	Campaign Girl	Maruzensky
Dam Cesario (JPN) 2002	Special Week; 1995	Campaign Girl	Lady Shiraoki
Dam Cesario (JPN) 2002	Kirov Premiere (GB); 1990	Sadler's Wells (USA)	Northern Dancer (CAN)
Dam Cesario (JPN) 2002	Kirov Premiere (GB); 1990	Sadler's Wells (USA)	Fairy Bridge
Dam Cesario (JPN) 2002	Kirov Premiere (GB); 1990	Querida (IRE)	Habitat (USA)
Dam Cesario (JPN) 2002	Kirov Premiere (GB); 1990	Querida (IRE)	Principia (FR) (family: 16-a)
