= Roger Barows =

Japanese Thoroughbred racehorse

Roger Barows ロジャーバローズ
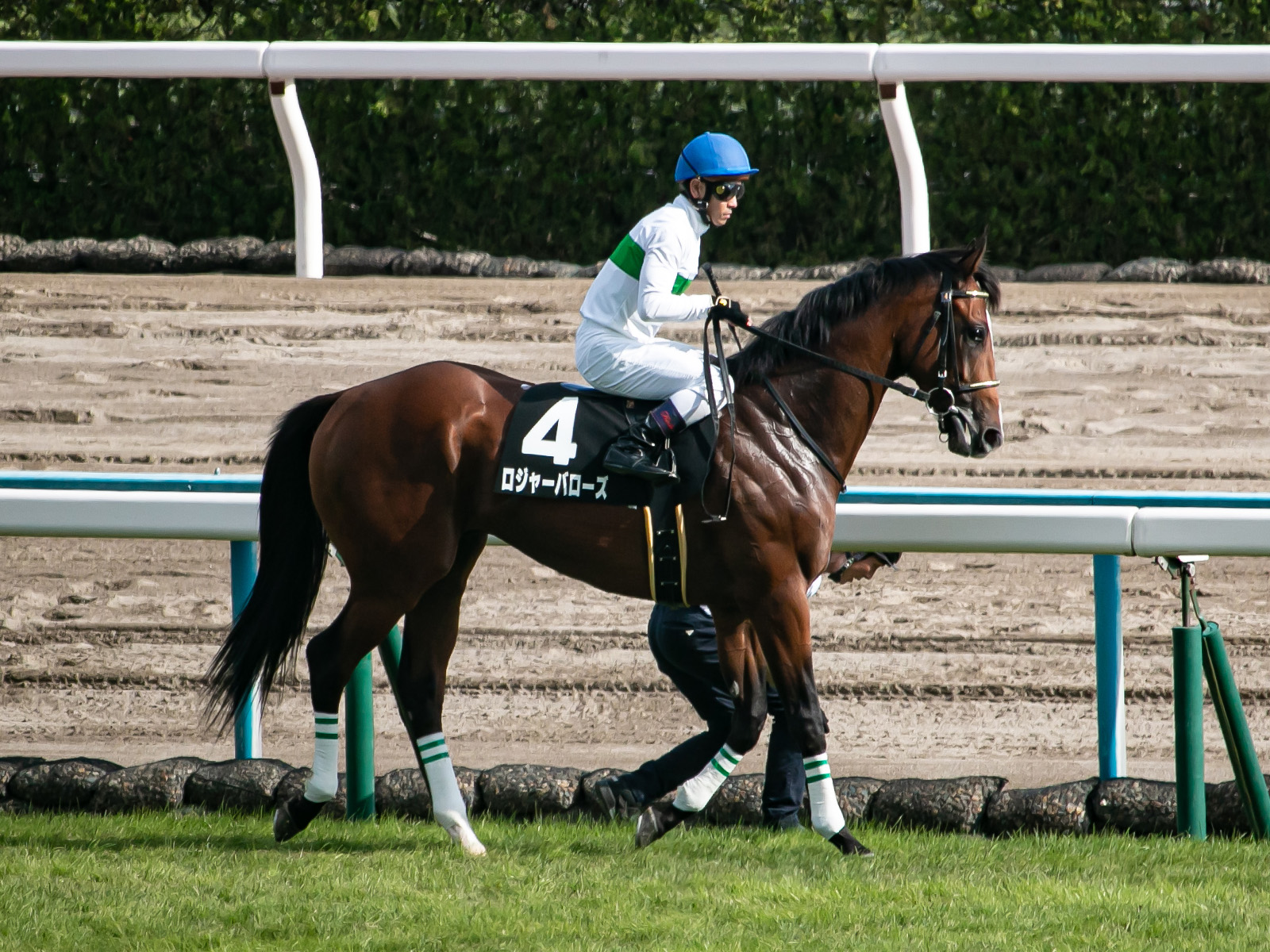
- Roger Barows in October 2018
- Breed: Thoroughbred
- Sire: Deep Impact
- Grandsire: Sunday Silence
- Dam: Little Book
- Damsire: Librettist
- Sex: Colt
- Foaled: 24 January 2016
- Died: 25 June 2024 (aged 8)
- Country: Japan
- Colour: Bay
- Breeder: Tobino Bokujo
- Owner: Hirotsugu Inokuma
- Racing colours
- Trainer: Katsuhiko Sumii
- Jockey: Suguru Hamanaka
- Record: 6: 3-2-0
- Earnings: ¥268,756,000

Major wins
- Japanese Classic Race wins: Tokyo Yushun (2019)

Roger Barows (Japanese: ロジャーバローズ, Hepburn: Rojā Barōzu; 24 January 2016 - 25 June 2024) was a Japanese Thoroughbred racehorse and briefly a breeding stallion before his death at the young age of 8 years. He showed some promise as a juvenile in 2018 when he won on his debut and ran second in his only other race. In the following spring he won a minor event in January and finished second in the Kyoto Shimbun Hai before recording an upset victory in the Tokyo Yushun. His racing career ended in August of that same year due to an injury.

== Background ==
Roger Barows was a bay colt with a white blaze bred in Japan by the Tobino Farm. As a foal in 2016 he was consigned to the Select Sale and was bought for ¥84,240,000 by Hirotsugu Inokuma. The colt was sent into training with Katsuhiko Sumii.

He was from the ninth crop of foals sired by Deep Impact, who was the Japanese Horse of the Year in 2005 and 2006, winning races including the Tokyo Yushun, Tenno Sho, Arima Kinen and Japan Cup. Deep Impact's other progeny include Gentildonna, Harp Star, Kizuna, A Shin Hikari, Marialite and Saxon Warrior. Roger Barows' dam Little Book was bred in the United Kingdom and showed very little racing ability in her home country, recording one third place in ten starts before being sold for 230,000 guineas in 2012 and being exported to Japan. She was a half sister to Donna Blini, the dam of Gentildonna.

== Racing career ==
=== 2018: two-year-old season ===
Roger Barows began his racing career on 18 August in a contest for previously unraced two-year-olds over 2000 metres at Niigata Racecourse and won from Point of Honor. On his only other start of the year he finished second to Admire Justa in a minor race over the same distance at Kyoto Racecourse on 14 October.

=== 2019: three-year-old season ===
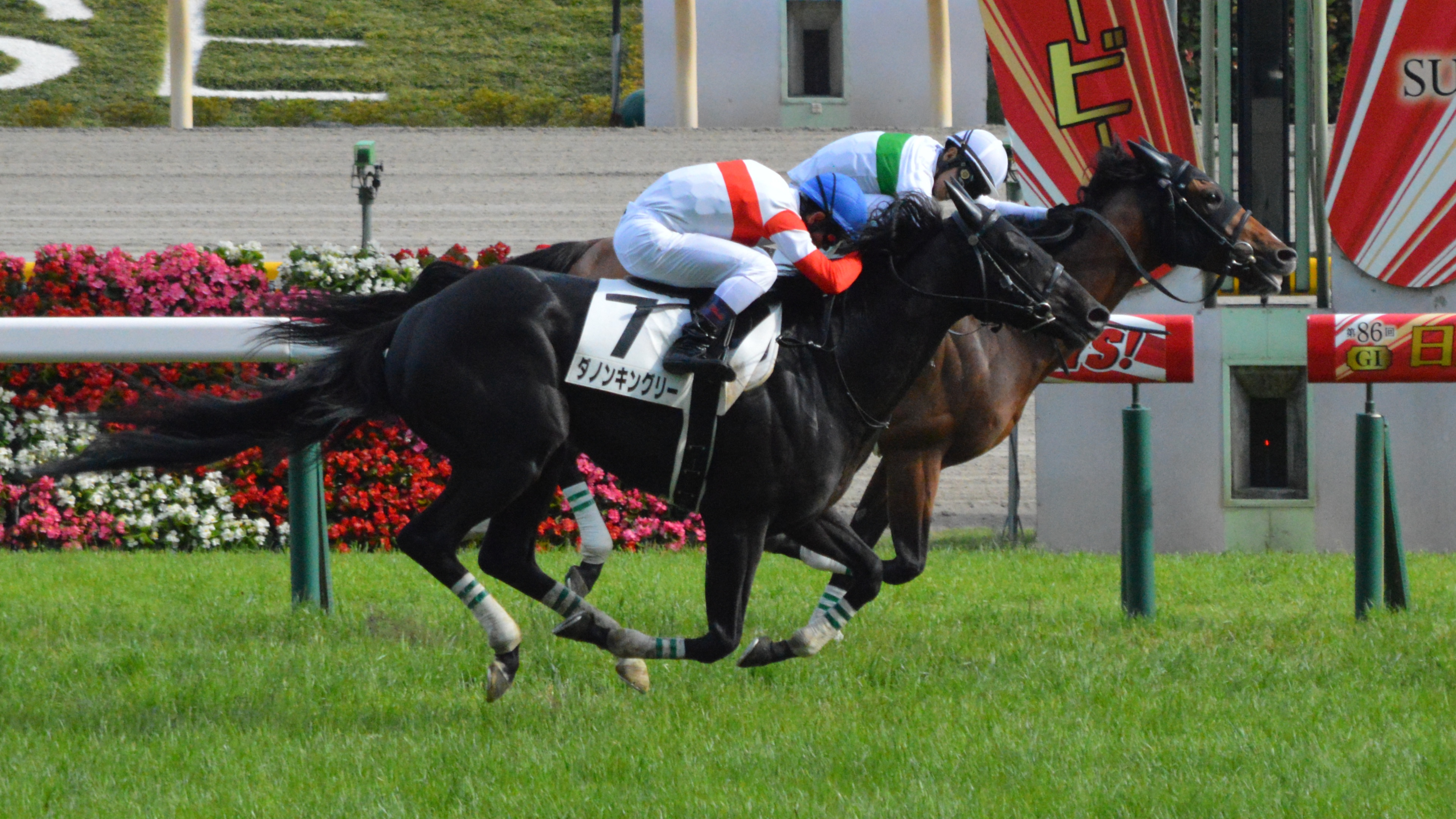
Roger Barows wins the 86th Tokyo Yushun

On his three-year-old debut Roger Barows ran in the Fukujuso Tokubetsu over 2000 metres at Kyoto and won from Hagino Upload and four others. He was then stepped up in class for the Grade 2 Spring Stakes (a major trial race for the Satsuki Sho) at Nakayama Racecourse in which he started the 4.1/1 second favourite. Ridden by Yuga Kawada he came home seventh of the sixteen runners, beaten three lengths by the winner Emeral Flight. Suguru Hamanaka took the mount when the colt started second favourite for the Kyoto Shimbun Hai over 2200 metres on 4 May. He took the lead from the start and maintained his advantage until the final strides when he was overtaken and beaten a neck by the 34/1 outsider Red Genial.

On 26 May, with Hamanaka again in the saddle, Roger Barows was made a 92/1 outsider for the 86th running of the Tokyo Yushun over 2400 metres on firm ground at Tokyo Racecourse. His stablemate Saturnalia started odds-on favourite while the other sixteen runners included his old rivals Admire Justa, Emeral Flight and Red Genial as well as Velox (runner-up in the Satsuki Sho), Danon Kingly, Lion Lion (Aoba Sho), Courageux Guerrier (Kyoto Nisai Stakes) Meisho Tengen (Yayoi Sho) and Nishino Daisy (Tokyo Sports Hai Nisai Stakes). In front of a 110,000 crowd Lion Lion started quickly and set a very fast pace, opening up a clear lead from Roger Barows who was in turn clear of the rest for most of the way. When Lion Lion faltered in the straight, Roger Barows went to the front just inside the last 400 metres and held off the persistent challenge of Danon Kingly to win by a neck with two and a half lengths back to Velox in third place. The winning time of 2:22.6 was a new record for the race. Hamanaka commented "The colt is a stayer with much stamina so he held on strongly even after the uphill climb and ran persistently all the way to the end." He went on to pay tribute to his late grandfather who had introduced him to the sport saying "Without him, I would not have liked horse racing or become a jockey. I could not show him my victory in the Derby, but I did make his dream come true today."

On 6 August Katsuhiko Sumii announced that Roger Barows had been retired from racing after the colt was found to be suffering from a bowed tendon.

In January 2020, at the JRA Awards for 2019, Roger Barows finished fourth in the poll to determine the Best Three-Year-Old Colt.

== Racing form ==
Below data is based on data available on JBIS Search and netkeiba.com.

| Date | Track | Race | Grade | Distance (Condition) | Entry | HN | Odds (Favored) | Finish | Time | Margins | Jockey | Winner (Runner-up) |
|---|---|---|---|---|---|---|---|---|---|---|---|---|
2018 – two-year-old season
| Aug 18 | Niigata | 2yo Newcomer | | 2,000 m (Firm) | 14 | 2 | 2.5 (1) | 1st | 2:02.5 | –0.2 | Keita Tosaki | (Point of Honor) |
| Oct 14 | Kyoto | Shigiku Sho | ALW (1W) | 2,000 m (Firm) | 7 | 4 | 4.2 (3) | 2nd | 2:01.0 | 0.2 | Keita Tosaki | Admire Justa |
2019 – three-year-old season
| Jan 5 | Kyoto | Fukujuso Tokubetsu | ALW (1W) | 2,000 m (Firm) | 6 | 4 | 2.3 (1) | 1st | 2:02.4 | –0.3 | Kohei Matsuyama | (Hagino Upload) |
| Mar 7 | Nakayama | Spring Stakes | 2 | 1,800 m (Firm) | 16 | 15 | 5.1 (2) | 7th | 1:48.2 | 0.4 | Yuga Kawada | Emeral Fight |
| May 4 | Kyoto | Kyoto Shimbun Hai | 2 | 2,200 m (Firm) | 14 | 3 | 5.2 (2) | 2nd | 2:11.9 | 0.0 | Suguru Hamanaka | Red Genial |
| May 26 | Tokyo | Tokyo Yushun | 1 | 2,400 m (Firm) | 18 | 1 | 93.1 (12) | 1st | R2:22.6 | 0.0 | Suguru Hamanaka | (Danon Kingly) |

Legend:
Turf

- R indicated that it was a record finish time.

== Stud record ==
A month later it was announced that Roger Barows would begin his career as a breeding stallion at the Arrow Stud near Shinhidaka, Hokkaido.

On 24 June 2024, Roger Barows died at the age of 8.

== Pedigree ==
Pedigree of Roger Barows (JPN), bay colt 2016
| Sire Deep Impact (JPN) 2002 | Sunday Silence (USA); 1986 | Halo | Hail to Reason |
| Sire Deep Impact (JPN) 2002 | Sunday Silence (USA); 1986 | Halo | Cosmah |
| Sire Deep Impact (JPN) 2002 | Sunday Silence (USA); 1986 | Wishing Well | Understanding |
| Sire Deep Impact (JPN) 2002 | Sunday Silence (USA); 1986 | Wishing Well | Mountain Flower |
| Sire Deep Impact (JPN) 2002 | Wind in Her Hair (IRE); 1991 | Alzao (USA) | Lyphard |
| Sire Deep Impact (JPN) 2002 | Wind in Her Hair (IRE); 1991 | Alzao (USA) | Lady Rebecca (GB) |
| Sire Deep Impact (JPN) 2002 | Wind in Her Hair (IRE); 1991 | Burghclere (GB) | Busted |
| Sire Deep Impact (JPN) 2002 | Wind in Her Hair (IRE); 1991 | Burghclere (GB) | Highclere |
| Dam Little Book (GB) 2008 | Librettist (USA); 2002 | Danzig | Northern Dancer (CAN) |
| Dam Little Book (GB) 2008 | Librettist (USA); 2002 | Danzig | Pas de Nom |
| Dam Little Book (GB) 2008 | Librettist (USA); 2002 | Mysterial | Alleged |
| Dam Little Book (GB) 2008 | Librettist (USA); 2002 | Mysterial | Mysteries |
| Dam Little Book (GB) 2008 | Cal Norma's Lady (IRE); 1988 | Lyphard's Special (USA) | Lyphard |
| Dam Little Book (GB) 2008 | Cal Norma's Lady (IRE); 1988 | Lyphard's Special (USA) | My Bupers |
| Dam Little Book (GB) 2008 | Cal Norma's Lady (IRE); 1988 | June Darling | Junius |
| Dam Little Book (GB) 2008 | Cal Norma's Lady (IRE); 1988 | June Darling | Beau Darling (Family: 16-f) |

- Roger Barows is inbred 4 × 4 to Lyphard, meaning that this stallion appears twice in the fourth generation of his pedigree.
