= Saratoga Dew Stakes =

- Class: Restricted stakes
- Location: Saratoga Race Course; Saratoga Springs, New York, United States
- Inaugurated: 2004
- Race type: Thoroughbred - Flat racing
- Website: www.nyra.com/Saratoga/

Race information
- Distance: 1 1/8 miles (9 furlongs)
- Surface: Dirt
- Track: left-handed
- Qualification: Fillies & Mares 3-years-old & Up
- Weight: Assigned
- Purse: $100,000

The Saratoga Dew Stakes is an American Thoroughbred horse race held annually at the end of August at Saratoga Race Course in Saratoga Springs, New York. Restricted to New York bred fillies and Mares, age three or older, it is contested on dirt over a distance of one and one eight miles (9 furlongs).

Inaugurated in 2004, the race is named for the New York–bred filly Saratoga Dew, a multiple Grade 1 winner on NYRA tracks who was voted the 1992 Eclipse Award as the American Champion Three-Year-Old Filly. The race was later renamed the Johnstone Mile.

== Records ==
Speed record:

- 1.49:87 - Hot Stones (2015)

Most wins:

- 2 - Judy Soda (2005, 2006)
- 2 - Go Unbridled (2012, 2013)

Most wins by a jockey:

- 4 - Junior Alvarado (2012, 2013, 2018,)

Most wins by a trainer:

- 3 - Thomas M. Bush (2004, 2005, 2006)
- 3 - Rudy R. Rodriguez (2016, 2017, 2018)

Most wins by an owner:

- 3 - Michael Dubb (2016, 2017, 2021)

== Winners ==
Year	Winner	Age	Jockey	Trainer	Owner	Purse
2024	Sterling Silver	5	Junior Alvarado	William I. Mott	Mark T. Anderson	1:37.40
2023	Venti Valentine	4	Manuel Franco	Jorge R. Abreu	NY Final Racing Racing Stable & Parkland Thoroughbreds	1:38.98
2021	Dancing Nikki	4	José Ortiz	Michael J. Maker	Michael Dubb	1:51.71
2019	Out of Orbit	4	Luis Saez	Phillip M. Serpe	Mary & Chester Broman Sr.	1:54.09
2018	Frostie Anne	5	Junior Alvarado	Rudy R. Rodriguez	Rudy R. Rodriguez & Michael Imperio	1:53.17
2017	Literata	6	Irad Ortiz Jr.	Rudy R. Rodriguez	Michael Dubb	1:52.16
2016	Jules N Rome	4	Javier Castellano	Rudy R. Rodriguez	Michael Dubb	1:50.98
2015	Hot Stones	5	John R. Velazquez	Bruce N. Levine	Roddy J. Valente, Charles Casale & Darlene Bilinski	1:49.87
2014	Carameaway	4	Rajiv Maragh	Mitch Friedman	Richard Greeley	1:52.54
2013	Go Unbridled	6	Junior Alvarado	H. Allen Jerkens	Howard T. Whitbred	1:51.68
2012	Go Unbridled	5	Junior Alvarado	H. Allen Jerkens	Howard T. Whitbred	1:49.90
2011	Mineralogist	4	David Cohen	John C. Kimmel	Mary & Chester Broman Sr.	1:53.11
2010	Wicked Diva	4	Ramon Dominguez	Michael E. Hushion	Michael E. Hushion	1:52.77
2009	Dean Henry	4	Rajiv Maragh	Thomas Albertrani	Lawrence Goichman	1:51.43
2008	Talking Treasure	4	John R. Velazquez	Charlton Baker	Kenneth & Sarah Ramsey	1:51.52
2007	Ice Cool Kitty	4	Edgar Prado	Richard E. Dutrow Jr.	Lansdon Robbins	1:51.10
2006	Judy Soda	5	Garrett Gomez	Thomas M. Bush	Scott S. Solar	1:53.17
2005	Judy Soda	4	Edgar Prado	Thomas M. Bush	Scott S. Solar	1:52.02
2004	Fait Accompli	3	Aaron Gryder	Thomas M. Bush	Berkshire Stud	1:52.48
