= Lord Kanaloa =

Japanese-bred Thoroughbred racehorse

Lord Kanaloa ロードカナロア
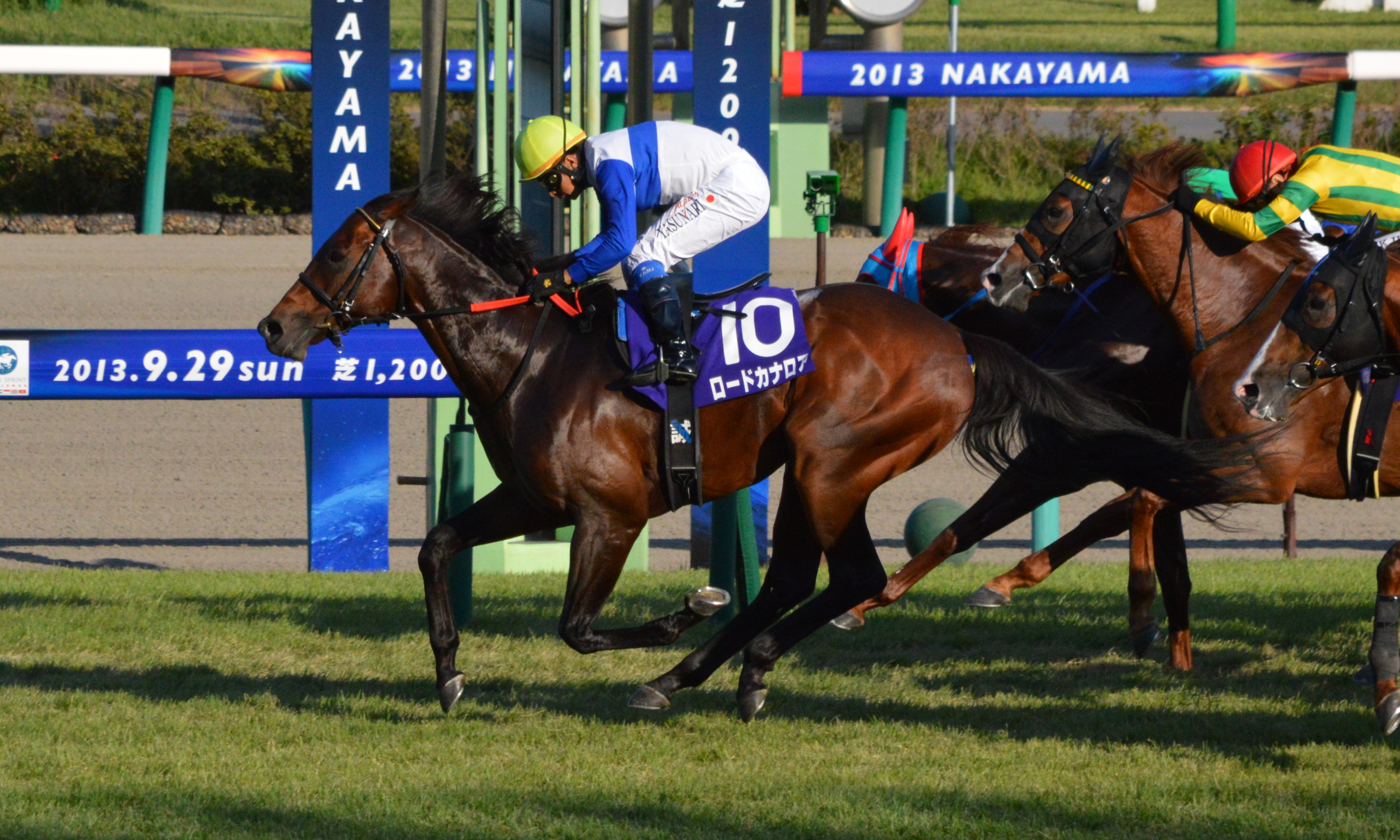
- Lord Kanaloa winning the 2013 Sprinters Stakes.
- Breed: Thoroughbred
- Sire: King Kamehameha (JPN)
- Grandsire: Kingmambo (USA)
- Dam: Lady Blossom (JPN)
- Damsire: Storm Cat (USA)
- Sex: Stallion
- Foaled: March 11, 2008 (age 18)
- Country: Japan
- Colour: Bay
- Breeder: K I Farm
- Owner: Lord Horse Club
- Racing colours
- Trainer: Takayuki Yasuda
- Jockey: Yasunari Iwata
- Record: 19:13-5-1
- Earnings: ¥669,958,000 + HK$ 17,100,000

Major wins
- Keihan Hai (2011); Silk Road Stakes (2012); Sprinters Stakes (2012, 2013); Hong Kong Sprint (2012, 2013); Hankyu Hai (2013); Takamatsunomiya Kinen (2013); Yasuda Kinen (2013)

Awards
- JRA Award for Best Sprinter or Miler (2012,2013); Japanese Horse of the Year (2013)

Honours
- Japan Racing Association Hall of Fame (2018); Timeform rating: 133

Lord Kanaloa (Japanese: ロードカナロア, Hepburn: Rōdo Kanaroa; foaled 11 March 2008) is a retired Japanese Thoroughbred racehorse and sire. A specialist sprinter, he recorded his first important success in 2011 when he won the Grade 3 Keihan Hai at Kyoto Racecourse. In the following year he won once from his first four starts but then emerged as a world-class performer with wins in the Sprinters Stakes and the Hong Kong Sprint, becoming the first Japanese horse to win the latter race. Lord Kanaloa was even better in 2013, winning the Takamatsunomiya Kinen before stepping up in distance to take the Yasuda Kinen. In the autumn he repeated his wins in the Sprinters Stakes and the Hong Kong Sprint and ended the year rated as one of the best racehorses in the world, and was also voted Japanese Horse of the Year.

== Background ==
Lord Kanaloa is a bay horse with no white markings bred in Hokkaido, Japan by the K I Farm. His sire, King Kamehameha, was one of the best Japanese colts of his generation, beating a field including Heart's Cry and Daiwa Major in the 2004 Japanese Derby. His other winners as a breeding stallion include Rose Kingdom (Japan Cup), Belshazzar (Japan Cup Dirt), Rulership (Queen Elizabeth II Cup) and Apapane (Japanese Fillies' Triple Crown). Lord Kanaloa's dam, Lady Blossom, won five of her twenty-four races between 1998 and 2001, and was a descendant of Somethingroyal, the dam of Secretariat and Sir Gaylord.

In July 2008, Lord Kanaloa was sent to the JRHA Select Foal Sales but was not sold. Lord Kanaloa entered the ownership of the Lord Horse Club and was sent into training with Takayuki Yasuda. The horse is named after a figure in Hawaiian mythology.

== Racing career ==
=== 2010: two-year-old season ===
Lord Kanaloa began his racing career on 5 December 2010 when he won a race at Kokura Racecourse.

=== 2011: three-year-old season ===
After finishing second on his three-year-old debut in January, Lord Kanaloa contested a race over 1200 metres at Kokura Racecourse on 16 April 2011 and won by three and a half lengths from fifteen opponents. In the following month he finished second when tried over a mile but then reverted to sprinting and won the Aoi Stakes over 1200m at Kyoto Racecourse. After the summer break he returned to Kyoto to win the Kyoraku Stakes on 6 November and was then moved up to Grade 3 class for the weight-for-age Keihan Cup over the same course and distance twenty days later. Ridden by Yuichi Fukunaga he started the 3/5 favourite and won by one and a half lengths from the five-year-old mare Grand Prix Angel.

=== 2012: four-year-old season ===
Lord Kanaloa was campaigned exclusively over 1200m in 2012, beginning with a win in the Grade 3 Silk Road Stakes at Kyoto in January by two and a half lengths at odds of 2/5. He then sustained three consecutive defeats. Moving up to Grade 1 class for the first time he finished third to the mare Curren Chan (also trained by Yasuda) in Takamatsunomiya Kinen at Chukyo Racecourse and in June he was beaten by Dream Valentino when odds-on favourite the Grade 3 Hakodate Sprint Stakes. By the time Lord Kanaloa returned in autumn Yasunari Iwata had replaced Fukunaga as the horse's regular jockey. In the Grade 2 Centaur Stakes at Hanshin Racecourse in September he started favourite but was beaten a head by the three-year-old filly Epice Arome.

On 30 September at Nakayama, Lord Kanaloa contested the Grade 1 Sprinters Stakes in which he was opposed by Curren Chan, Epice Arome and Dream Valentino as well as the leading Hong Kong sprinters Lucky Nine and Little Bridge. The race was run in high winds caused by the approach of Typhoon Jelawat. Starting at odds of 17/5, Lord Kanaloa raced behind the leaders before making progress in the final quarter mile, taking the lead inside the last 100m and winning by three-quarters of a length from Curren Chan in a course record time of 1:06.7. On his final appearance of the season, Lord Kanaloa was sent to Sha Tin Racecourse on 9 December for the Hong Kong Sprint. The local runners included Lucky Nine, Flying Blue and Joy And Fun while the international challenge was augmented by Curren Chan and the Manikato Stakes winner Sea Siren from Australia. Lord Kanaloa was always among the leaders before taking the lead in the straight and drawing away to win by two and a half lengths from the locally trained gelding Cerise Cherry. No horses from Japan had won the Hong Kong Sprint before. After the race Yasuda said that Lord Kanaloa would be "a pioneer for Japanese sprinters" and could compete anywhere in the world.

=== 2013: five-year-old season ===
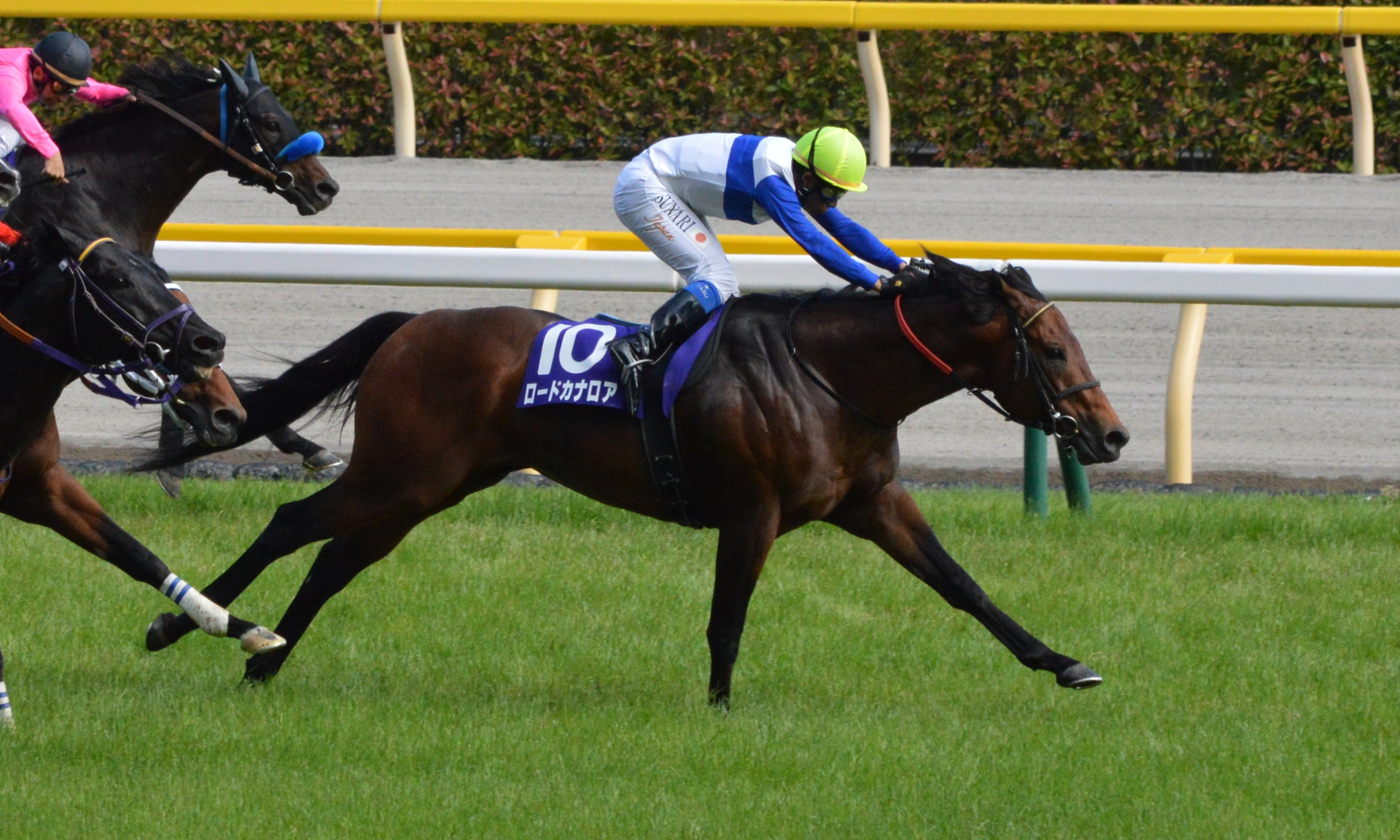
Lord Kanaloa wins the Yasuda Kinen

On his debut as a five-year-old, Lord Kanaloa carried top weight of 128 pounds in the Grade 3 Hankyu Hai at Hanshin on 24 February. Racing over a longer distance of 1400m he started the 3/5 favourite and won by three quarters of a length from Majin Prosper. On 24 March, the horse made a second attempt to win the Takamatsunomiya Kinen and was made the 30/100 favourite against sixteen opponents. He recorded his third Grade 1 victory, going clear in the straight and holding the late run of Dream Valentino by one and a quarter lengths. The winning time of 1:08.01 was a new course record. After the race Iwata commented "I think he is the strongest sprinter in the world, so I thought he should not be beaten against domestic rivals like this". Lord Kanaloa's connections then moved the horse up in distance to 1600m (one mile) for the first time to contest the Grade 1 Yasuda Kinen at Tokyo Racecourse. He started the 3/1 favourite in a field which included Verxina (Victoria Mile), Grand Prix Boss (2011 NHK Mile Cup), Curren Black Hill (2012 NHK Mile Cup) and Glorious Days (Hong Kong Stewards' Cup). Racing down the centre of the track, he took the lead 100m from the finish and won by a neck and three-quarters of a length from Shonan Mighty and Danon Shark.

On his return from the summer break, Lord Kanaloa returned to sprinting when he ran for the second time in the Centaur Stakes on 8 September. He started the 2/5 favourite but was beaten a neck by the four-year-old Hakusan Moon, to whom he was attempting to concede five pounds. On 29 September, Lord Kanaloa met Hakusan Moon at level weights in the Sprinters' Stakes and started the 30/100 favourite in a field which also included Majin Prosper and Grand Prix Boss. He won the race for a second time, beating Hakusan Moon by three quarters of a length with the 159/1 outsider Mayano Ryujin a neck away in third place. On 8 December, Lord Kanaloa ended his career as he attempted to repeat his 2012 success in the Hong Kong Sprint. He started the 11/8 favourite against the leading local sprinters Lucky Nine, Sterling City and Frederick Engels, with a strong European challenge headed by Sole Power and the Nunthorpe Stakes winner Jwala. Iwata restrained the horse in the early stages before making progress in the straight. He overtook Rich Tapestry 200m from the finish and accelerated clear of the field to win impressively by five lengths from Sole Power.

== Assessment ==
In the 2012 World Thoroughbred Rankings Lord Kanaloa was rated the tenth best sprinter in the world and the fifty-seventh best horse in any category. At the JRA Awards in January 2013, Lord Kanaloa was named Japanese Champion Sprinter or Miler of 2012, receiving 283 of the 289 votes. At the same ceremony he finished second in the voting for the JRA Award for Best Older Male Horse and fourth in the poll for Japanese Horse of the Year behind Gentildonna, Gold Ship and Orfevre.

Following his win in the 2013 Hong Kong Sprint the Racing Post rated Lord Kanaloa the joint-third best racehorse of the year, behind Treve and Wise Dan, and level with Black Caviar and Toronado.

In January 2014 he was named Japanese Horse of the Year for 2013 (receiving 209 out of 280 votes), Japanese Champion Sprinter or Miler (receiving all 280 votes). He became the first sprinter/miler to receive Japanese Horse of the Year since Taiki Shuttle in 1998. However, he lost to Orfevre in JRA Award for Best Older Male Horse. In the 2013 World's Best Racehorse Rankings, Lord Kanaloa earned a rating of 128, tying for fifth in the world with the German horse Novellist.

On 12 June 2018, Lord Kanaloa was inducted in the Japan Racing Association Hall of Fame.

== Stud record ==
=== Notable progeny ===
c = colt, f = filly, g = gelding
Bold = G1/Jpn1 stakes

Grade One winners
Foaled	Name	Sex	Major Wins
2015	Almond Eye	f	Shinzan Kinen, **Ōka Shō**, **Yushun Himba**, **Shūka Shō**, **Japan Cup** (twice), **Dubai Turf**, **Tennō Shō (Autumn)** (twice), **Victoria Mile**
2015	Danon Smash	c	Keihan Hai, Silk Road Stakes, Keeneland Cup, Ocean Stakes, Keio Hai Spring Cup, Centaur Stakes, **Hong Kong Sprint**, **Takamatsunomiya Kinen**
2015	Stelvio	c	Spring Stakes, **Mile Championship**
2016	First Force	c	CBC Sho, **Takamatsunomiya Kinen**
2016	Red le Zele	c	Negishi Stakes, **JBC Sprint**, Tokyo Hai
2016	Saturnalia	c	**Hopeful Stakes**, **Satsuki Shō**, Kobe Shimbun Hai, Kinko Sho
2017	Panthalassa	c	Fukushima Kinen, Nakayama Kinen, **Dubai Turf**, **Saudi Cup**
2017	Tagaloa	c	**Blue Diamond Stakes**, C S Hayes Stakes
2019	Danon Scorpion	c	Arlington Cup, **NHK Mile Cup**
2019	Satono Reve	c	Hakodate Sprint Stakes, Keeneland Cup, **Takamatsunomiya Kinen** (twice)
2020	Bellagio Opera	c	Spring Stakes, Challenge Cup, **Ōsaka Hai** (twice)
2020	Brede Weg	f	**Queen Elizabeth II Cup**, Fuchu Himba Stakes
2020	Costa Nova	c	Negishi Stakes, **February Stakes** (twice)
2020	Lord Fons	c	Kakitsubata Kinen, Negishi Stakes, **Sakitama Hai**

Other winners
Foaled	Name	Sex	Major Wins
2015	Diatonic	c	Swan Stakes (twice), Hakodate Sprint Stakes, Hankyu Hai, Hanshin Cup
2015	Jo Kana Chan	f	Ibis Summer Dash
2015	R Star	c	Kokura Kinen
2015	Red Galant	c	Nakayama Kimpai, Niigata Daishoten
2015	Trois Etoiles	f	Keisei Hai Autumn Handicap (twice)
2016	Cadence Call	c	Niigata Nisai Stakes, Kyoto Kimpai, Yomiuri Milers Cup
2016	Fantasist	c	Kokura Nisai Stakes, Keio Hai Nisai Stakes
2016	Groove It	c	Chukyo Kinen
2016	Iberis	f	Arlington Cup, Kyoto Himba Stakes
2016	King of Koji	c	Meguro Kinen, American Jockey Club Cup
2016	Val d'Isere	c	Shinzan Kinen
2017	Barnard Loop	c	Hyogo Championship
2017	Buon Voyage	f	Kitakyushu Kinen
2017	Ho O Emmy's	f	Fukushima Kinen
2018	June Velocity	c	Tokyo Jump Stakes (three times), Hanshin Jump Stakes, Tokyo High-jump (three times),
2018	Lei Halia	f	Keeneland Cup
2018	T M Tokkyu	c	Capella Stakes
2018	Time to Heaven	c	Lord Derby Challenge Trophy
2018	Veil Nebula	g	Hanshin Spring Jump
2019	David Barows	g	Naruo Kinen
2019	Kana Tape	f	Sekiya Kinen
2019	Kimiwa Queen	f	Hakodate Sprint Stakes
2019	King Hermes	c	Keio Hai Nisai Stakes
2019	Red Mon Reve	c	Keio Hai Spring Cup
2019	Scintillation	f	Kokura Himba Stakes
2019	Sublime Anthem	f	Fillies' Revue
2020	Argine	f	Turquoise Stakes, Queen Stakes
2020	Emperor Wakea	c	Negishi Stakes, Musashino Stakes
2020	Lord del Rey	c	Nikkei Shinshun Hai
2021	Ask One Time	c	Kokura Nisai Stakes
2021	Keep Calm	c	Shirasagi Stakes
2021	World's End	c	Keio Hai Spring Cup
2022	Dantsu Elan	f	Fantasy Stakes
2022	Run for Vow	f	Daily Hai Nisai Stakes
2023	Ask Ikigomi	c	Churchill Downs Cup
2023	Thunderstruck	c	Shinzan Kinen

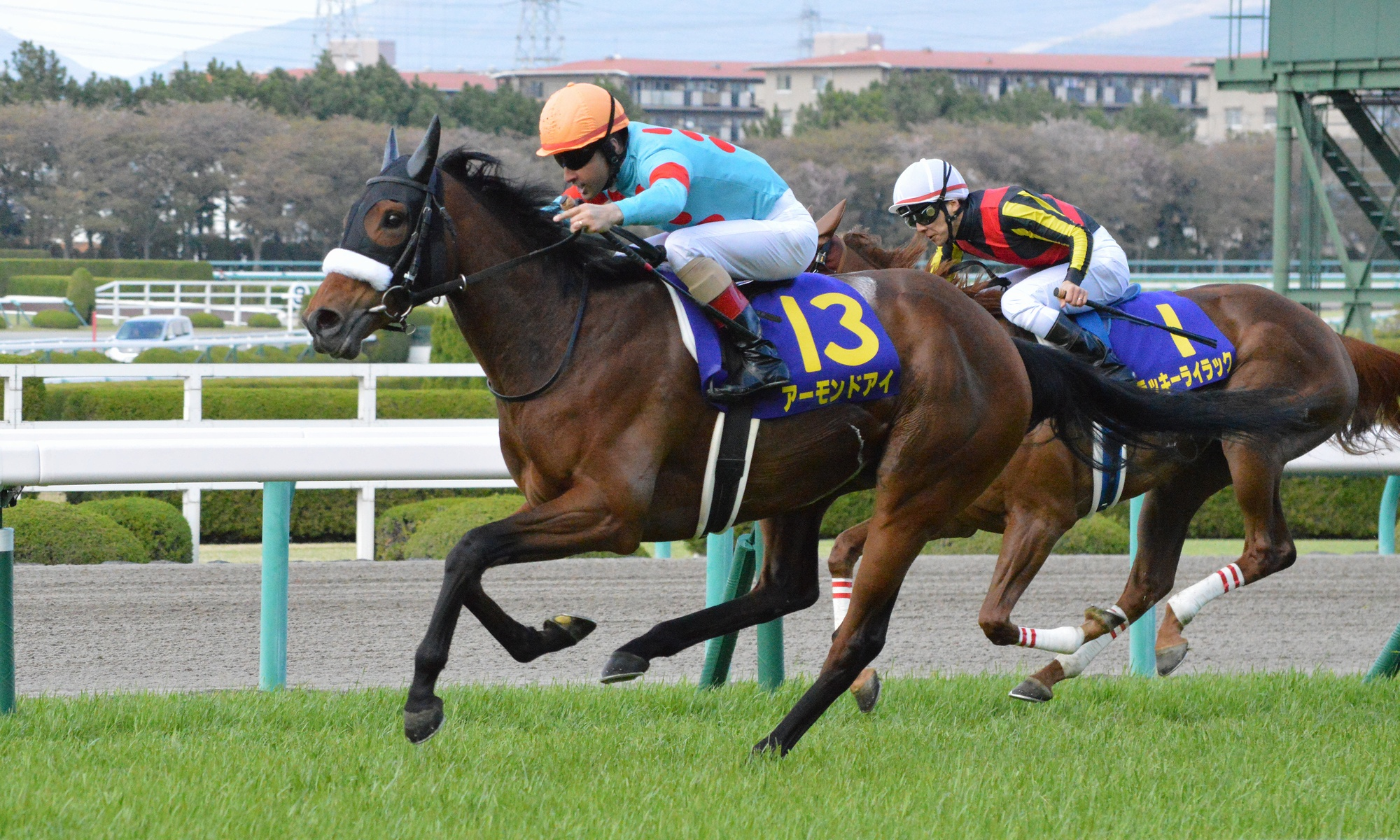
Almond Eye

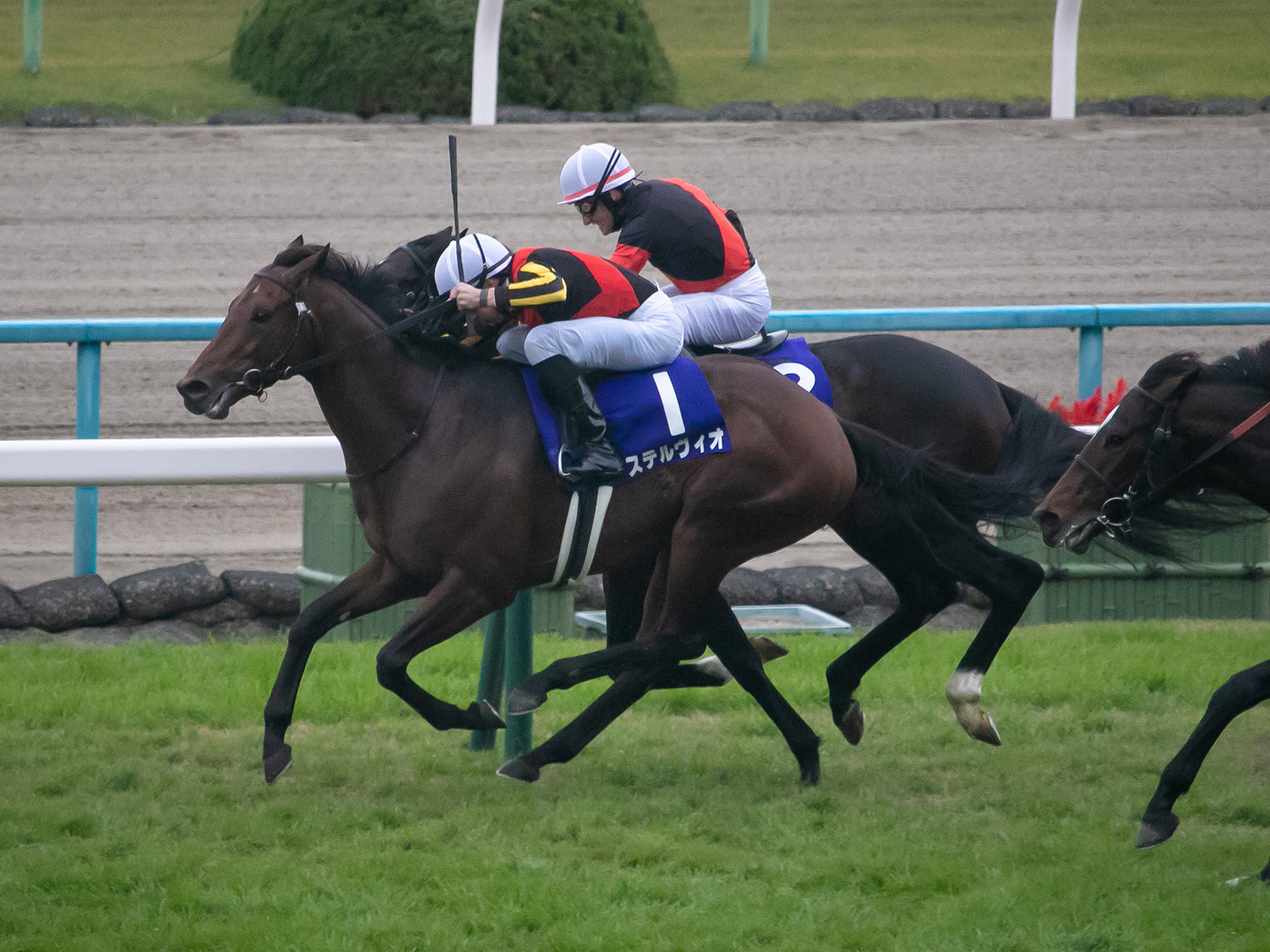
Stelvio

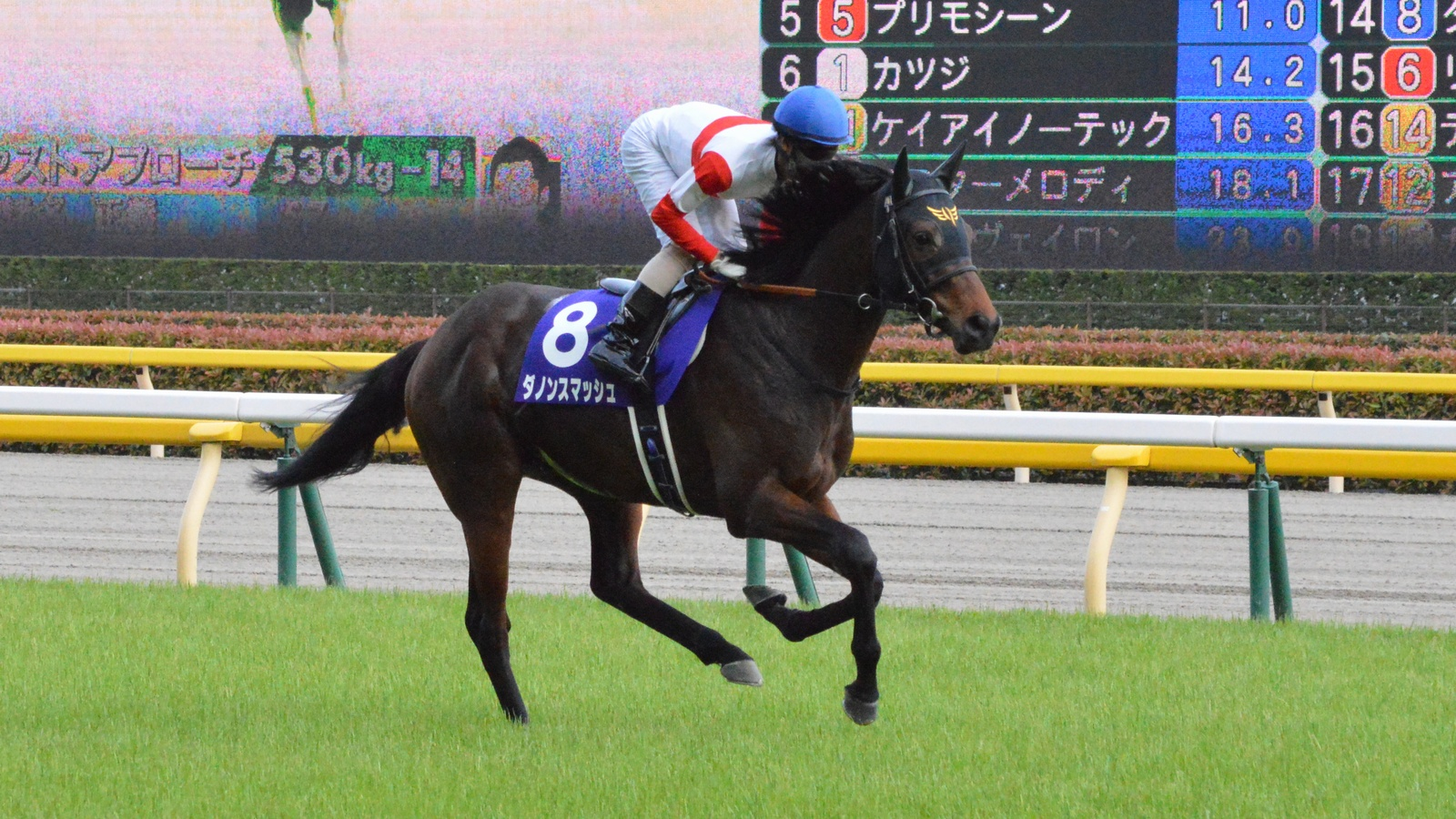
Danon Smash

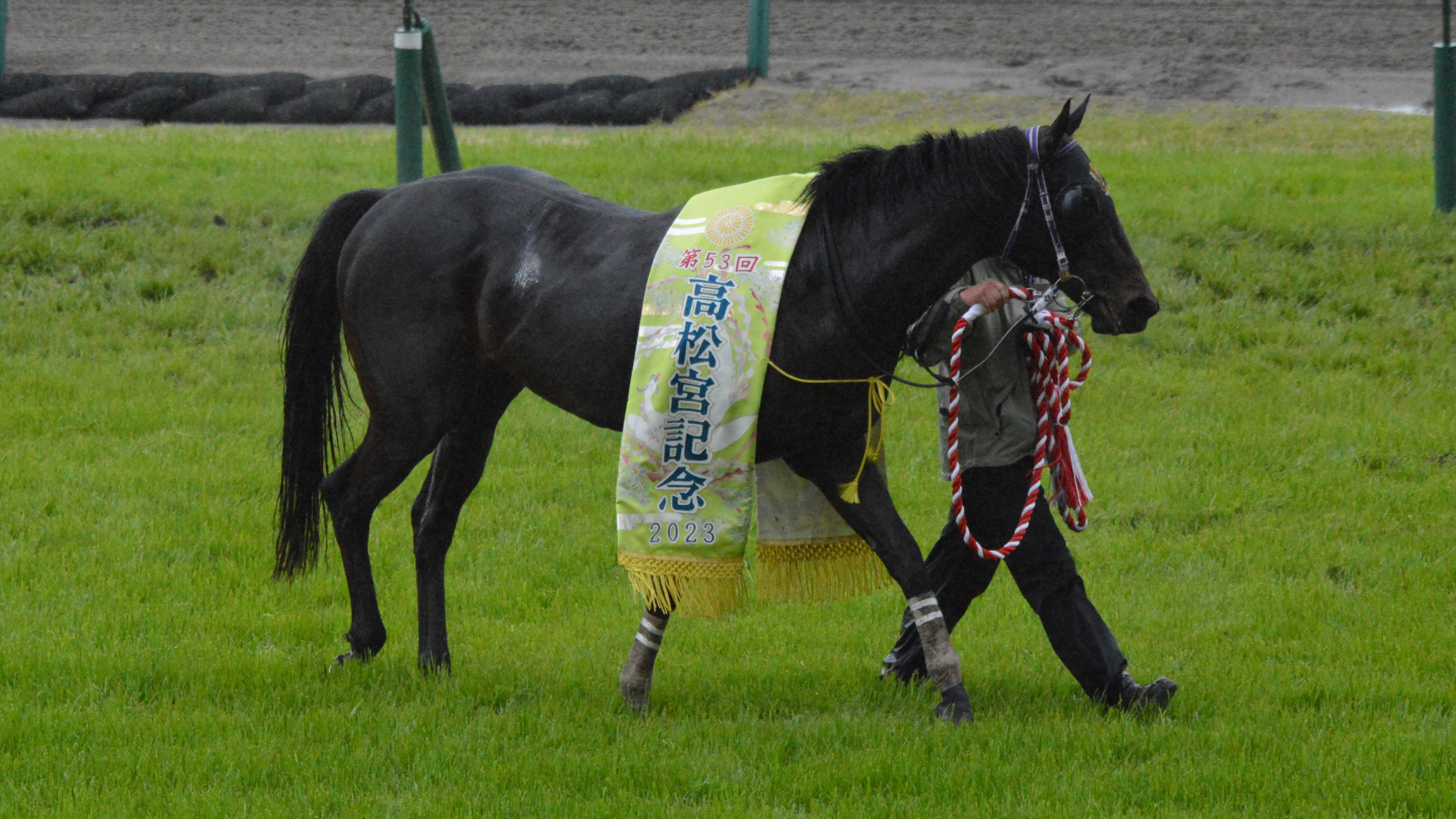
First Force

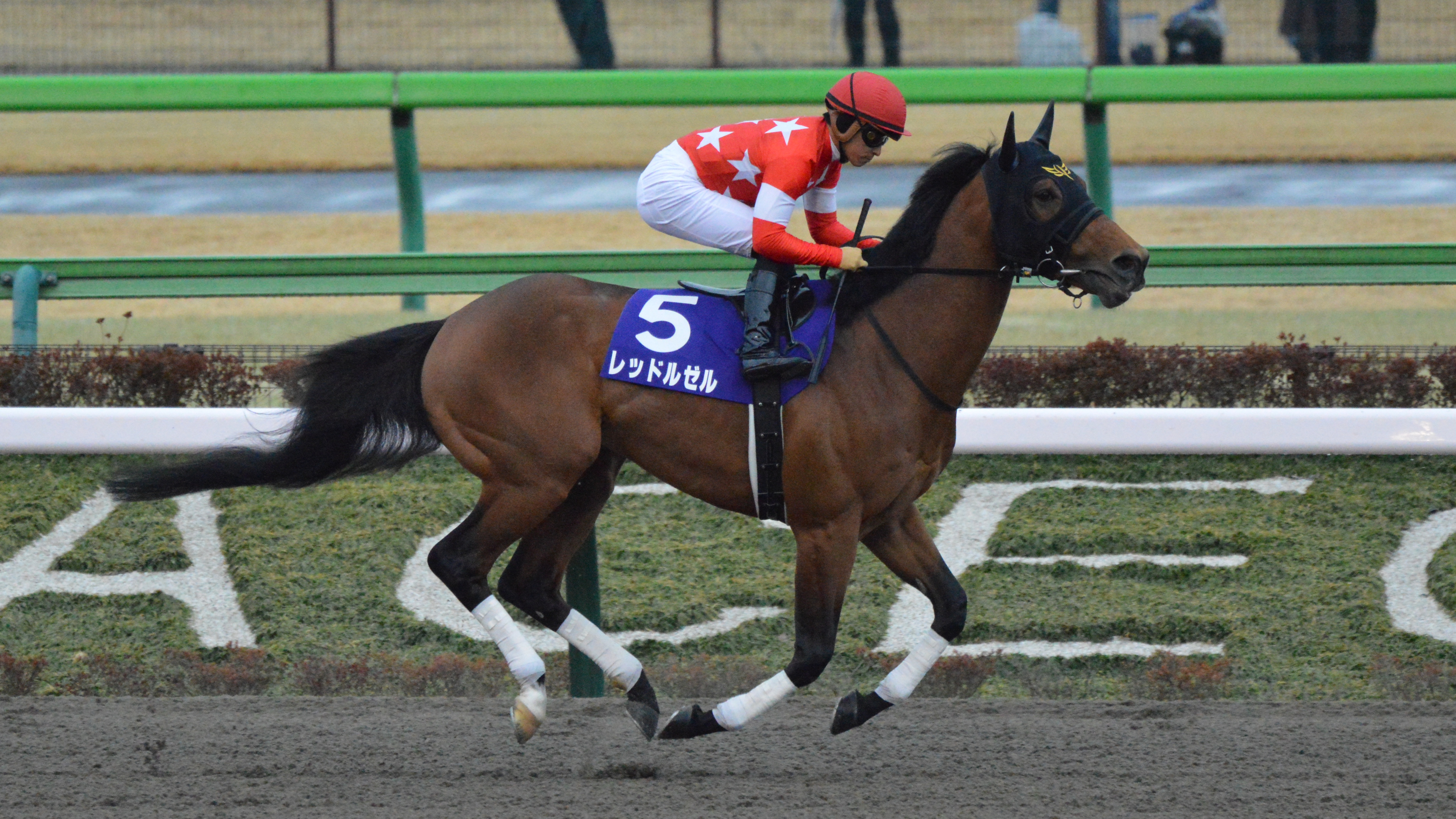
Red le Zele

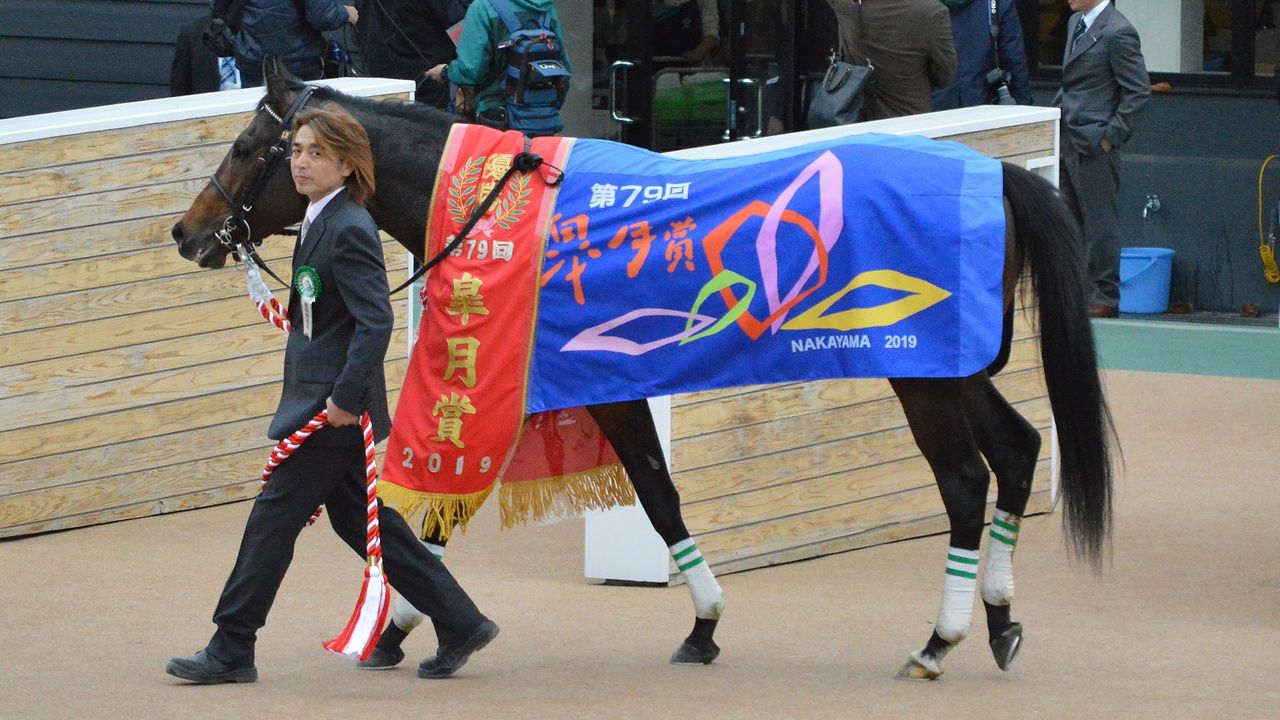
Saturnalia

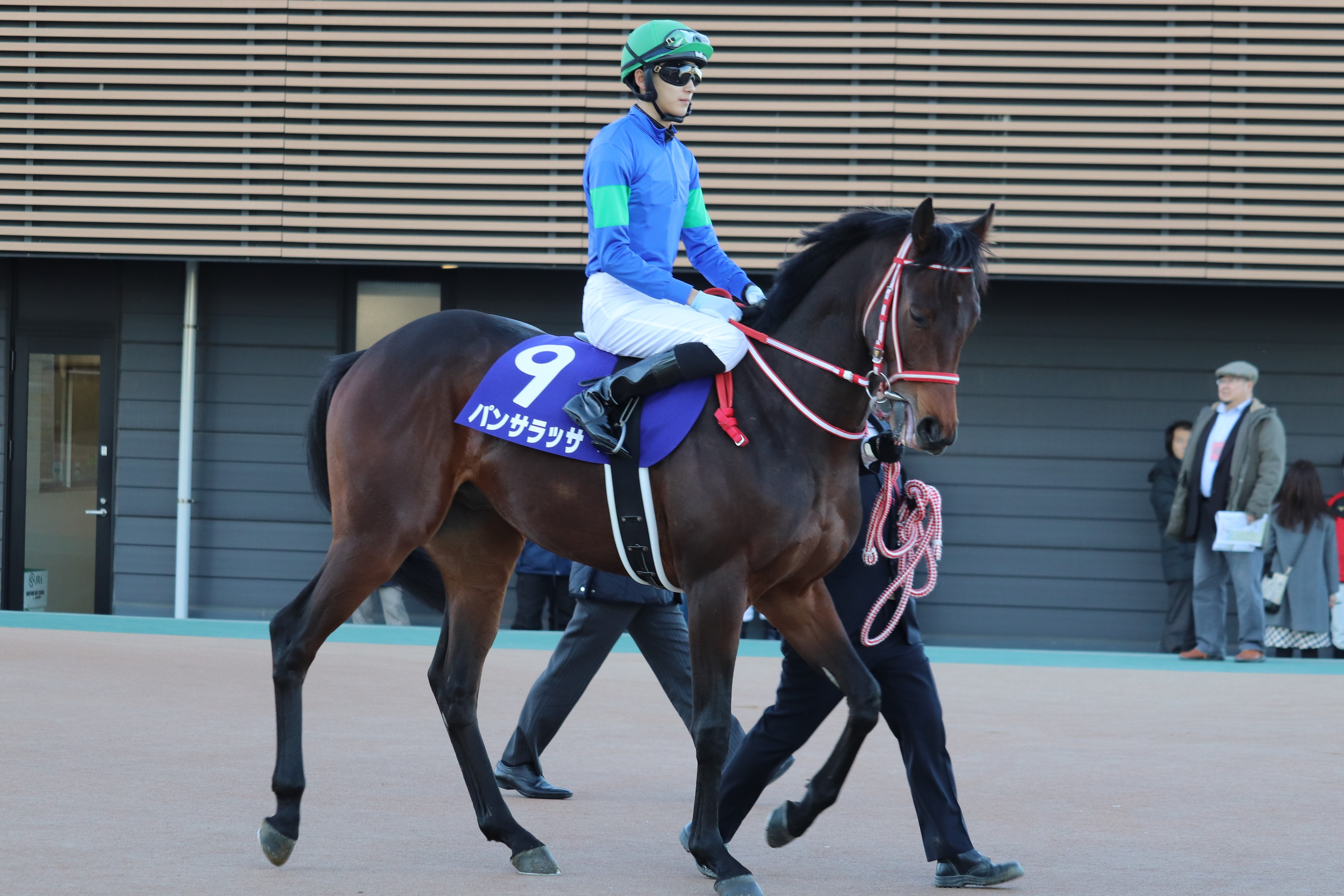
Panthalassa

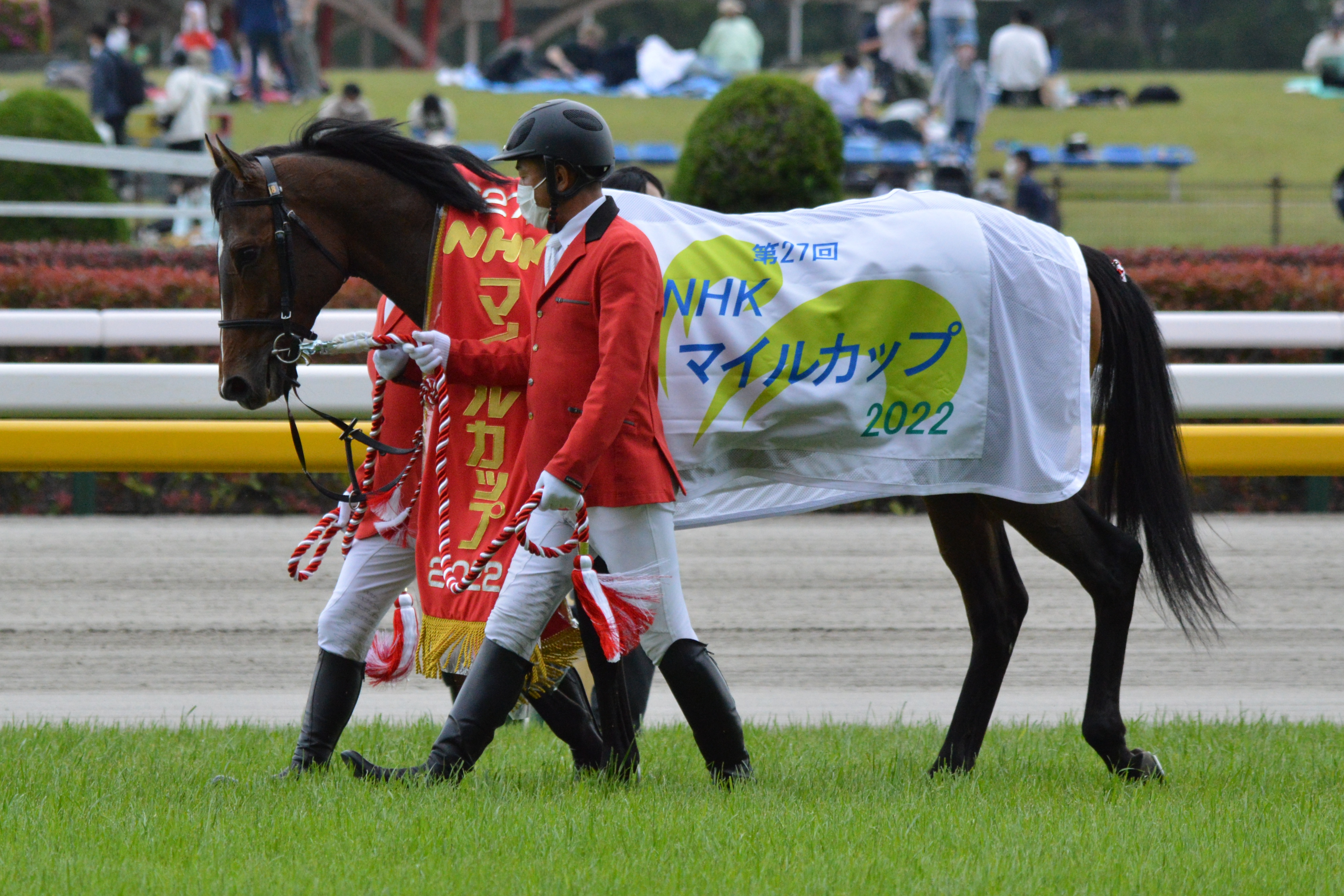
Danon Scorpion

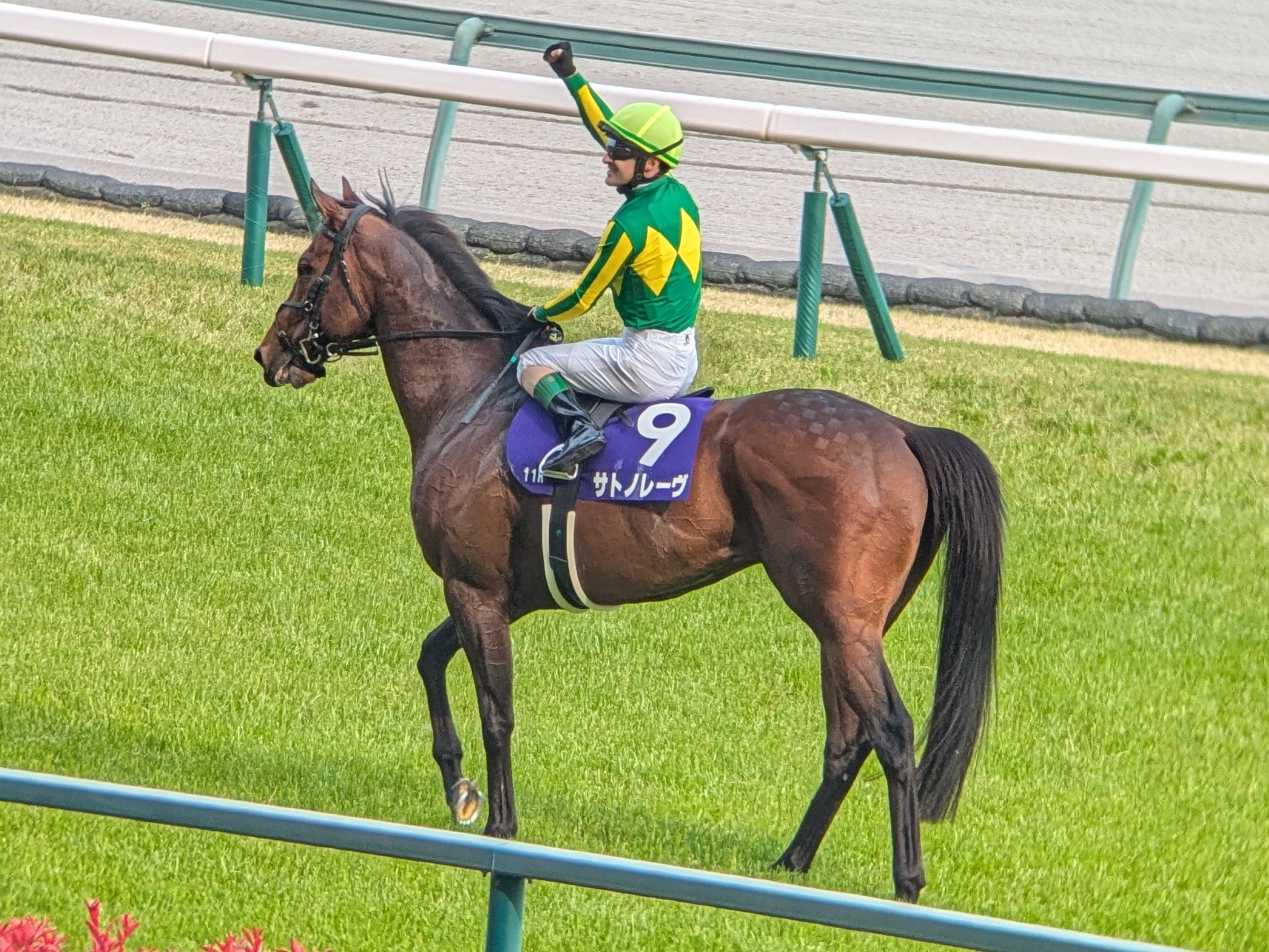
Satono Reve

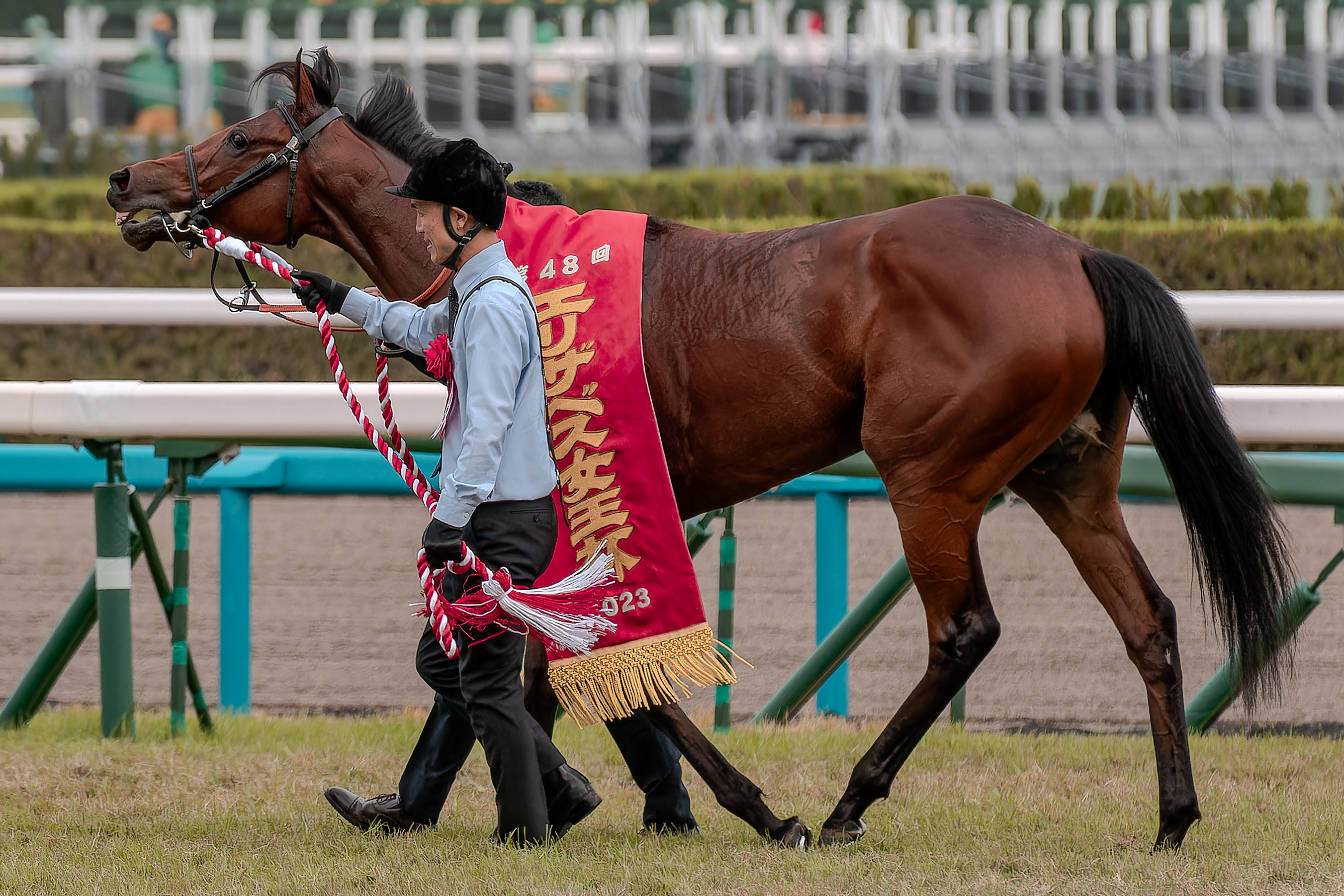
Brede Weg

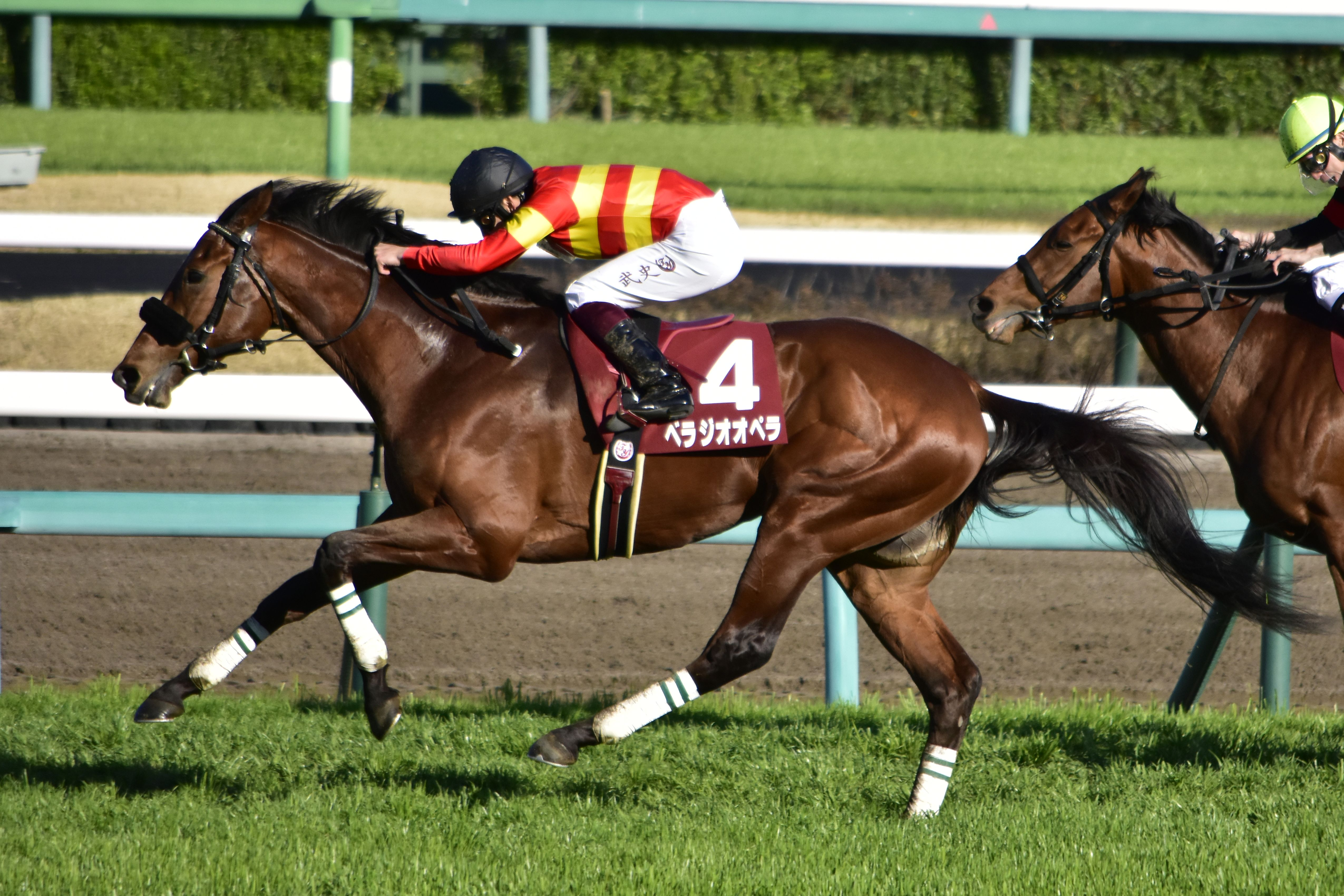
Bellagio Opera

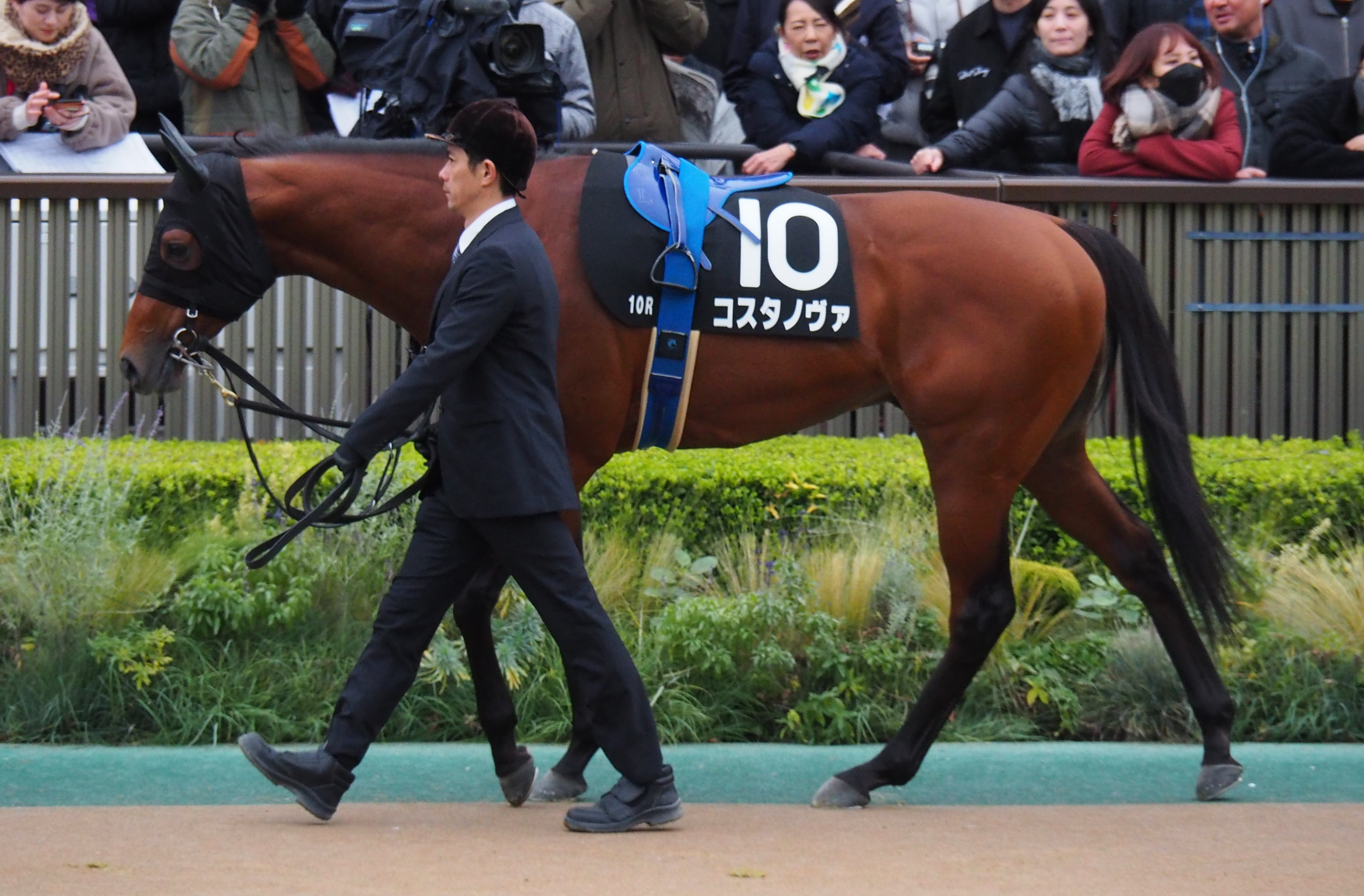
Costa Nova

Lord Fons

== Racing form ==
Lord Kanaloa won 13 out of 19 races with podiums in another six. This data is available in JBIS, netkeiba and HKJC.

Date	Age	Track	Race	Grade	Distance (Condition)	Entry	HN	Odds (Favored)	Finish	Time	Margins	Jockey	Winner (Runner-up)
Dec 5, 2010	2	Kokura	2yo Newcomer		1,200 m (Firm)	16	3	1.2 (1)	1st	1:08.4	–1.0	Yoshihiro Furukawa	(Ciel et Mer)
Jan 5, 2011	3	Nakayama	Junior Cup	OP	1,600 m (Firm)	13	12	2.1 (1)	2nd	1:35.1	0.1	Masayoshi Ebina	Derma Durga
Jan 29, 2011	3	Kyoto	3yo Allowance	1W	1,400 m (Firm)	14	2	1.8 (1)	2nd	1:22.1	0.1	Yuichi Fukunaga	Rattlesnake
Apr 16, 2011	3	Kokura	Dracaena Sho	ALW (1W)	1,200 m (Firm)	16	4	1.3 (1)	1st	1:08.3	–0.6	Yuichi Kitamura	(Aster Wing)
May 14, 2011	3	Kyoto	Aoi Stakes	OP	1,200 m (Firm)	14	3	2.4 (1)	1st	1:09.3	–0.2	Yuichi Kitamura	(Sakura Belle)
Nov 6, 2011	3	Kyoto	Kyoraku Stakes	OP	1,200 m (Good)	16	14	2.9 (1)	1st	1:08.0	–0.2	Yuichi Fukunaga	(Kyowa Magnum)
Nov 26, 2011	3	Kyoto	Keihan Hai	3	1,200 m (Firm)	15	3	1.6 (1)	1st	1:08.1	–0.2	Yuichi Fukunaga	(Grand Prix Angel)
Jan 28, 2012	4	Kyoto	Silk Road Stakes	3	1,200 m (Firm)	16	7	1.4 (1)	1st	1:08.3	–0.4	Yuichi Fukunaga	(A Shin Duck Man)
Mar 25, 2012	4	Chukyo	Takamatsunomiya Kinen	1	1,200 m (Firm)	18	1	2.4 (1)	3rd	1:10.4	0.1	Yuichi Fukunaga	Curren Chan
Jun 17, 2012	4	Hakodate	Hakodate Sprint Stakes	3	1,200 m (Firm)	11	1	1.3 (1)	2nd	1:09.5	0.1	Yuichi Fukunaga	Dream Valentino
Sep 9, 2012	4	Hanshin	Centaur Stakes	2	1,200 m (Firm)	16	9	2.2 (1)	2nd	1:07.3	0.0	Yasunari Iwata	Epice Arome
Sep 30, 2012	4	Nakayama	Sprinters Stakes	1	1,200 m (Firm)	16	16	4.4 (2)	1st	R1:06.7	–0.1	Yasunari Iwata	(Curren Chan)
Dec 9, 2012	4	Sha Tin	Hong Kong Sprint	1	1,200 m (Good)	12	4	4.0 (3)	1st	1:08.5	–0.4	Yasunari Iwata	(Cerise Cherry)
Feb 24, 2013	5	Hanshin	Hankyu Hai	3	1,400 m (Firm)	16	3	1.6 (1)	1st	1:21.0	–0.1	Yasunari Iwata	(Majin Prosper)
Mar 24, 2013	5	Chukyo	Takamatsunomiya Kinen	1	1,200 m (Firm)	17	11	1.3 (1)	1st	R1:08.1	–0.2	Yasunari Iwata	(Dream Valentino)
Jun 2, 2013	5	Tokyo	Yasuda Kinen	1	1,600 m (Firm)	18	10	4.0 (1)	1st	1:31.5	0.0	Yasunari Iwata	(Shonan Mighty)
Sep 8, 2013	5	Hanshin	Centaur Stakes	2	1,200 m (Firm)	13	9	1.4 (1)	2nd	1:07.5	0.0	Yasunari Iwata	Hakusan Moon
Sep 29, 2013	5	Nakayama	Sprinters Stakes	1	1,200 m (Firm)	16	10	1.3 (1)	1st	1:07.2	–0.1	Yasunari Iwata	(Hakusan Moon)
Dec 8, 2013	5	Sha Tin	Hong Kong Sprint	1	1,200 m (Firm)	14	1	1.8 (1)	1st	1:08.3	–0.8	Yasunari Iwata	(Sole Power)

Legend:
Turf

- R indicated that it was a record time finish

== Pedigree ==
Pedigree of Lord Kanaloa (JPN), bay horse, 2008
Sire King Kamehameha (JPN) 2001	Kingmambo (USA); 1990	Mr. Prospector	Raise a Native
Sire King Kamehameha (JPN) 2001	Kingmambo (USA); 1990	Mr. Prospector	Gold Digger
Sire King Kamehameha (JPN) 2001	Kingmambo (USA); 1990	Miesque	Nureyev
Sire King Kamehameha (JPN) 2001	Kingmambo (USA); 1990	Miesque	Pasadoble
Sire King Kamehameha (JPN) 2001	Manfath (IRE); 1991	Last Tycoon	Try My Best
Sire King Kamehameha (JPN) 2001	Manfath (IRE); 1991	Last Tycoon	Mill Princess
Sire King Kamehameha (JPN) 2001	Manfath (IRE); 1991	Pilot Bird	Blakeney
Sire King Kamehameha (JPN) 2001	Manfath (IRE); 1991	Pilot Bird	The Dancer
Dam Lady Blossom (JPN) 1996	Storm Cat (USA); 1983	Storm Bird	Northern Dancer
Dam Lady Blossom (JPN) 1996	Storm Cat (USA); 1983	Storm Bird	South Ocean
Dam Lady Blossom (JPN) 1996	Storm Cat (USA); 1983	Terlingua	Secretariat
Dam Lady Blossom (JPN) 1996	Storm Cat (USA); 1983	Terlingua	Crimson Saint
Dam Lady Blossom (JPN) 1996	Saratoga Dew (USA); 1989	Cormorant	His Majesty
Dam Lady Blossom (JPN) 1996	Saratoga Dew (USA); 1989	Cormorant	Song Sparrow
Dam Lady Blossom (JPN) 1996	Saratoga Dew (USA); 1989	Super Luna	In Reality
Dam Lady Blossom (JPN) 1996	Saratoga Dew (USA); 1989	Super Luna	Alada (family: 2-s)
