= Saratoga Dew =

American-bred Thoroughbred racehorse

- Sire: Cormorant
- Grandsire: His Majesty
- Dam: Super Luna
- Damsire: In Reality
- Sex: Mare
- Foaled: April 3, 1989; New York, USA
- Died: April 4, 2013 (aged 24); Japan
- Country: United States
- Colour: Bay
- Breeder: Penny Chenery
- Owner: Charles F. Engel
- Trainer: Gary Sciacca
- Record: 11: 8-1-0
- Earnings: US$541,580

Major wins
- Hyde Park Handicap (1992); New York Oaks (1992); Over All Stakes (1992); Beldame Stakes (1992); Gazelle Handicap (1992); Comely Stakes (1992)

Awards
- American Champion Three-Year-Old Filly (1992)

Honours
- Saratoga Dew Stakes at Saratoga Racecourse

Saratoga Dew (April 3, 1989 - April 4, 2013) was an American Thoroughbred Champion racehorse. Bred by Penny Chenery, owner of Secretariat, and raced by Charles F. Engel, in 1992 Saratoga Dew became the first New York-bred horse to win an Eclipse Award.

Trained by Gary Sciacca and ridden by Herb McCauley in her major races, en route to earning 1992 American Champion Three-Year-Old Filly honors, Saratoga Dew won eight times. In top level races she was second by a nose in the Alabama Stakes then scored wins in the Grade 1 Gazelle Handicap and Beldame Stakes and the Grade 2 Comely Stakes. Sent off as the parimutuel betting favorite in the 1992 Breeders' Cup Distaff at Florida's Gulfstream Park, Saratoga Dew had the lead by the half-mile mark but faded badly to finish twelfth in a fourteen-horse field.

Retired to broodmare duty, in 1995 Saratoga Dew was bought by Osamu Yasuda of Shinkoh Farm for 850,000 US$ at the November Breeding Sales to stand at Japan.

Her first born, Lady Blossom, foaled champion sprinter and JRA Hall of Fame inductee Lord Kanaloa.

== Pedigree ==
Pedigree of Saratoga Dew
Sire Cormorant	His Majesty	Ribot	Tenerani
Sire Cormorant	His Majesty	Ribot	Romanella
Sire Cormorant	His Majesty	Flower Bowl	Alibhai
Sire Cormorant	His Majesty	Flower Bowl	Flower Bed
Sire Cormorant	Song Sparrow	Tudor Minstrel	Owen Tudor
Sire Cormorant	Song Sparrow	Tudor Minstrel	Sansonnet
Sire Cormorant	Song Sparrow	Swoon's Tune	Swoon's Son
Sire Cormorant	Song Sparrow	Swoon's Tune	Recess
Dam Super Luna	In Reality	Intentionally	Intent
Dam Super Luna	In Reality	Intentionally	My Recipe
Dam Super Luna	In Reality	My Dear Girl	Rough'n Tumble
Dam Super Luna	In Reality	My Dear Girl	Iltis
Dam Super Luna	Alada	Riva Ridge	First Landing
Dam Super Luna	Alada	Riva Ridge	Iberia
Dam Super Luna	Alada	Syrian Sea	Bold Ruler
Dam Super Luna	Alada	Syrian Sea	Somethingroyal
