= NHK Mile Cup =

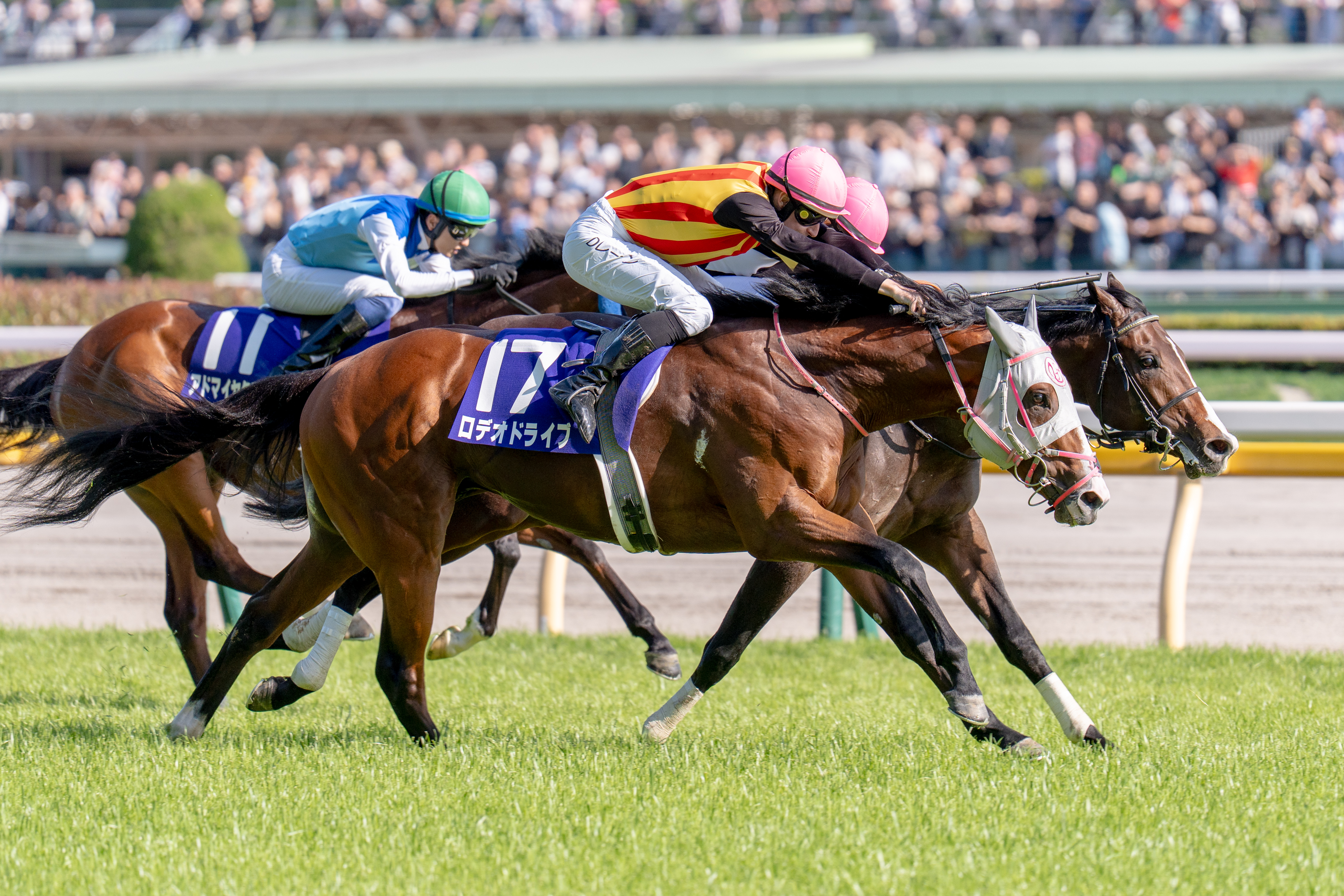
- 2026 NHK Mile Cup winner Rodeo Drive
- Class: Grade 1
- Location: Tokyo Racecourse, Fuchu, Tokyo, Tokyo
- Inaugurated: May 12, 1996
- Race type: Thoroughbred
- Website: japanracing.jp/

Race information
- Distance: 1,600 meters (About 8 furlongs / 1 mile)
- Surface: Turf
- Track: Left-handed
- Qualification: 3-y-o, colts & Fillies only, no Geldings
- Weight: 57 kg Allowance: Fillies & SH-bred 2 kg
- Purse: ¥ 281,300,000 (as of 2026): 1st: ¥ 130,000,000; 2nd: ¥ 52,000,000; 3rd: ¥ 33,000,000

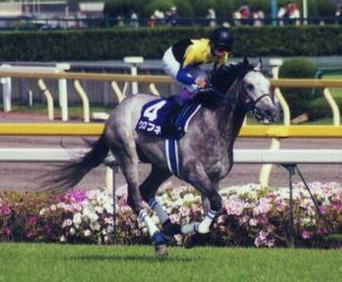
The 6th (2001) winner Kurofune

The NHK Mile Cup (NHKマイルカップ, NHK Mairu Kappu) is a Grade 1 flat horse race in Japan for three-year-old thoroughbred colts and fillies, run over a distance of 1,600 metres (approximately one mile) on the turf at Tokyo Racecourse in May.

The NHK Mile Cup is sponsored by the Japanese public broadcasting organization NHK, and as such, it is broadcast not only on Fuji TV (one of NHK's competitors) but on one of the NHK channels that cover horse racing (NHK General TV; the other, BS-1, covers certain other races such as the Japan Cup). (In Japanese horseracing, "Sponsor" does not mean that an individual or organization provides prize money. They provide only the prize, cup, trophy etc.)

Before the year 2001, this was the only G1 race for colts and fillies that non-Japanese bred three-year-olds could participate in, which led to this race being considered informally as the "Japanese Derby for non-Japanese bred horses" until foreign-bred entry restrictions were lifted in 2001. Until 2010 it was limited to domestic-trained horses, but this restriction was removed that year (as for the Japanese classics). A maximum of nine foreign horses are allowed entry in the NHK Mile Cup. It is considered one of the prep races for both the Yushun Himba (the Japanese Oaks), run in May, and the Tokyo Yushun (the Japanese Derby), which takes place in late May or early June.

== Trial races ==
Trial races provide automatic berths to the winning horses or placed horses as specified.

Race	Grade	Racecourse	Distance	Condition
Churchill Downs Cup	GIII	Hanshin	1,600 metres	Top 3 horses
New Zealand Trophy	GII	Nakayama	1,600 metres	Top 3 horses

== Other step races ==
Races listed below does not provide automatic berths, but still important steps for this race.

Race	Grade	Racecourse	Distance
Junior Cup	Listed	Nakayama	1,600 metres
Shinzan Kinen	GIII	Kyoto	1,600 metres
Crocus Stakes	Listed	Tokyo	1,400 metres
Marguerite Stakes	Listed	Hanshin	1,200 metres
Falcon Stakes	GIII	Chukyo	1,400 metres
Mainichi Hai	GIII	Hanshin	1,800 metres
Oka Sho	GI	Hanshin	1,600 metres
Satsuki Sho	GI	Nakayama	2,000 metres

== Winners ==
(Winners in italic are also later winners from either Yushun Himba or Tokyo Yushun that year)

Year	Winner	Jockey	Trainer	Owner	Time
1996	Taiki Fortune	Yoshitomi Shibata	Yoshiyasu Takahashi	Taiki Farm	1:32.6
1997	Seeking the Pearl	Yutaka Take	Hideyuki Mori	Tomoko Uenaka	1:33.1
1998	El Condor Pasa	Hitoshi Matoba	Yoshitaka Ninomiya	Takashi Watanabe	1:33.7
1999	Symboli Indy	Norihiro Yokoyama	Kazuo Fujisawa	Symboli Bokujo	1:33.8
2000	Eagle Cafe	Yukio Okabe	Futoshi Kojima	Kiyoshi Nishikawa	1:33.5
2001	Kurofune	Yutaka Take	Kunihide Matsuda	Makoto Kaneko	1:33.0
2002	Telegnosis	Masaki Katsuura	Hiroaki Sugiura	Shadai Racehorse co.	1:33.1
2003	Win Kluger	Koshiro Take	Shigeki Matsumoto	Win Co. Ltd.	1:34.2
2004	King Kamehameha	Katsumi Ando	Kunihide Matsuda	Makoto Kaneko	1:32.5
2005	Rhein Kraft	Yuichi Fukunaga	Tsutomu Setoguchi	Shigemasa Ohsawa	1:33.6
2006	Logic	Yutaka Take	Kojiro Hashiguchi	Koji Maeda	1:33.2
2007	Pink Kameo	Hiroyuki Uchida	Sakae Kunieda	Kaneko Makoto Holdings Co., Ltd.	1:34.3
2008	Deep Sky	Hirofumi Shii	Mitsugu Kon	Toshio Fukami	1:34.2
2009	Jo Cappuccino	Kota Fujioka	Kazuya Nakatake	Keiko Ueda	1:32.4
2010	Danon Chantilly	Katsumi Ando	Kunihide Matsuda	Danox Co. Ltd.	1:31.4
2011	Grand Prix Boss	Craig Williams	Yoshito Yahagi	Grand Prix Co. Ltd.	1:32.2
2012	Curren Black Hill	Shinichiro Akiyama	Osamu Hirata	Takashi Suzuki	1:34.5
2013	Meiner Ho O	Daichi Shibata	Yoshihiro Hatakeyama	K Thoroughbred Club Ruffian	1:32.7
2014	Mikki Isle	Suguru Hamanaka	Hidetaka Otonashi	Mizuki Noda	1:33.2
2015	Clarity Sky	Norihiro Yokoyama	Yasuo Tomomichi	Tadakuni Sugiyama	1:33.5
2016	Major Emblem	Christophe Lemaire	Yasuhito Tamura	Sunday Racing	1:32.8
2017	Aerolithe	Norihiro Yokoyama	Takanori Kikuzawa	Sunday Racing	1:32.3
2018	Keiai Nautique	Yusuke Fujioka	Osamu Hirata	Kazuhiro Kameda	1:32.8
2019	Admire Mars	Mirco Demuro	Yasuo Tomomichi	Riichi Kondo	1:32.4
2020	Lauda Sion	Mirco Demuro	Takashi Saito	Silk Racing	1:32.5
2021	Schnell Meister	Christophe Lemaire	Takahisa Tezuka	Sunday Racing	1:31.6
2022	Danon Scorpion	Yuga Kawada	Takayuki Yasuda	Danox Co. Ltd.	1:32.3
2023	Champagne Color	Hiroyuki Uchida	Tsuyoshi Tanaka	Yoichi Aoyama	1:33.8
2024	Jantar Mantar	Yuga Kawada	Tomokazu Takano	Shadai Race Horse Co. Ltd.	1:32.4
2025	Panja Tower	Kohei Matsuyama	Shinsuke Hashiguchi	Deep Creek Co. Ltd.	1:31.7
2026	Rodeo Drive	Damian Lane	Tetsuhide Tsuji	Katsumi Yoshida	1:31.5

Speed Record

- Danon Chantilly (2010) = 1:31.4

== See also ==
- Horse racing in Japan
- List of Japanese flat horse races
