= Normcore (horse) =

Japanese Thoroughbred racehorse

Normcore; ノームコア
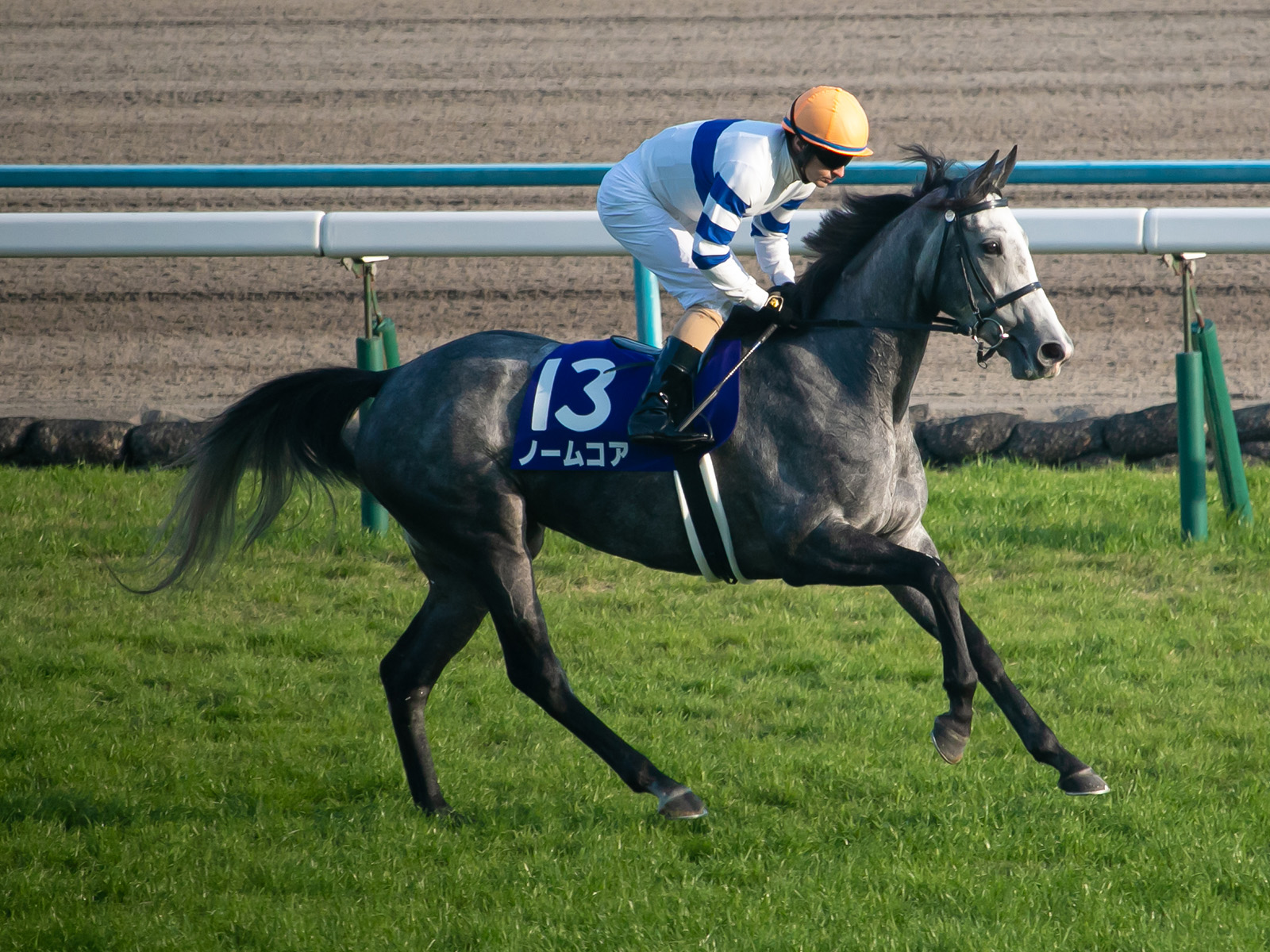
- Sire: Harbinger
- Grandsire: Dansili
- Dam: Chronologist
- Damsire: Kurofune
- Sex: Mare
- Foaled: 25 February 2015
- Country: Japan
- Colour: Grey
- Breeder: Northern Farm
- Owner: Seiichi Iketani
- Racing colours
- Trainer: Kiyoshi Hagiwara
- Jockey: Christophe Lemaire; Norihiro Yokoyama; Damian Lane; Zac Purton
- Record: 17: 7-1-3
- Earnings: ¥367,288,000 + HK$17,385,000

Major wins
- Shion Stakes (2018); Victoria Mile (2019); Fuji Stakes (2019); Sapporo Kinen (2020); Hong Kong Cup (2020)

Normcore (Japanese: ノームコア foaled 25 February 2015) is a retired Japanese Thoroughbred racehorse. She showed promising form in her first two seasons, winning both of her races as a juvenile in 2017 and taking the Grade 3 Shion Stakes in the following year. As a four-year-old, she recorded a Grade 1 success in the Victoria Mile as well as taking the Fuji Stakes. In 2020 she finished third in the Victoria Mile and won the Sapporo Kinen before claiming the Hong Kong Cup at Sha Tin Racecourse on her final career run. She earned over US$5.7 million in prize money.

== Background ==
Normcore is a grey mare bred in Japan by Northern Farm. As a yearling in 2016 she was consigned to the Japan Racing Horse Association Sale of Yearlings and Weanlings and was bought for ¥23,760,000 by Seiichi Iketani. She was sent into training with Kiyoshi Hagiwara.

She was from the fourth crop of foals sired by Harbinger, a British horse who was rated the best racehorse in the world in 2010 when he won the King George VI and Queen Elizabeth Stakes by eleven lengths. Since retiring to stud in Japan, his other foals have included Deirdre, Blast Onepiece, Mozu Katchan (Queen Elizabeth II Cup) and Persian Knight (Mile Championship).

Normcore's dam Chronologist, from whom she inherited her grey colour, showed modest racing ability, winning one minor race as a three-year-old in 2006. As a broodmare she also produced Chrono Genesis. She was descended from the American broodmare Nimble Doll (foaled 1952), making her a distant relative of Captain Steve.

== Racing career ==
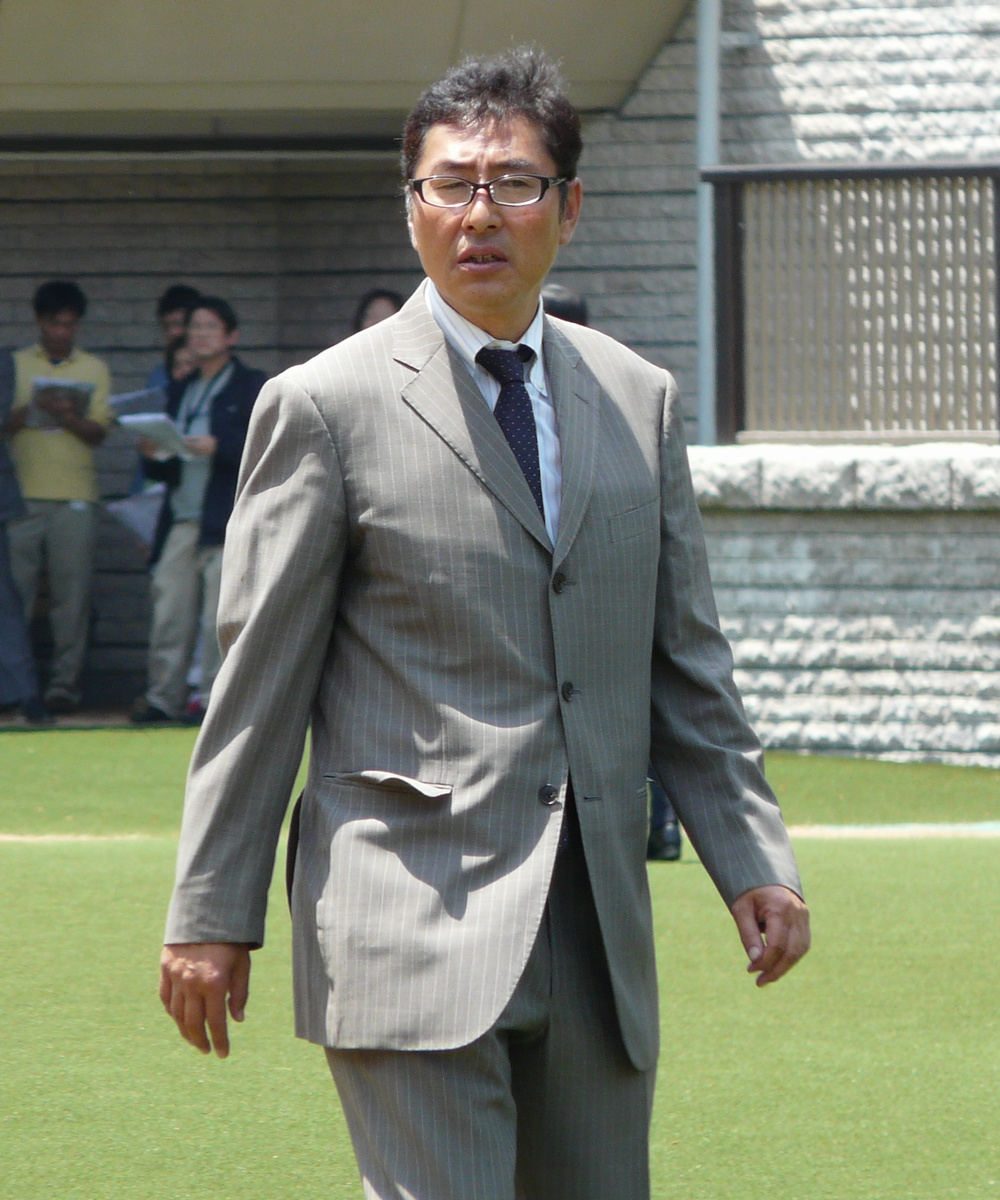
Normcore's trainer Kiyoshi Hagiwara

=== Early racing career: 2017 & 2018 ===
Normcore began her racing career in a newcomers race over 1800 metres at Fukushima Racecourse on 16 July in which she disputed the lead from the start before drawing away in the closing stages to win by three and a half lengths. On her only other start of the year she went off the 1.1/1 favourite for the 1600 metre Aster Sho at Nakayama Racecourse and won by three quarters of a length from the colt Soil to the Soul after racing in second place for most of the way.

For her first run as a three-year-old, Normcore was stepped up in class to contest the Grade 3 Flower Cup at Nakayama in March and ran third behind Cantabile and Tosen Bless, beaten two and a quarter lengths by the winner. In the following month she finished third again when beaten by Satono Walkure and Pioneer Bio in the Grade 2 Flora Stakes over 2000 metres at Tokyo Racecourse. After a summer break she returned for the Grade 3 Shion Stakes over 2000 metres at Nakayama on 8 September in which she was ridden by Christophe Lemaire. Starting the 3.2/1 second favourite she took the lead in the straight and won by three lengths from Mauna Lea. The filly bypassed the Shuka Sho and ended her season at Kyoto Racecourse in November when she was matched against older fillies and mares in the Grade 1 Queen Elizabeth II Cup over 2200 metres. With Lemaire again in the saddle, she started second choice in the betting but after tracking the leaders for most of the way she faded in the straight and came home fifth behind the four-year-old Lys Gracieux.

=== 2019: four-year-old season ===
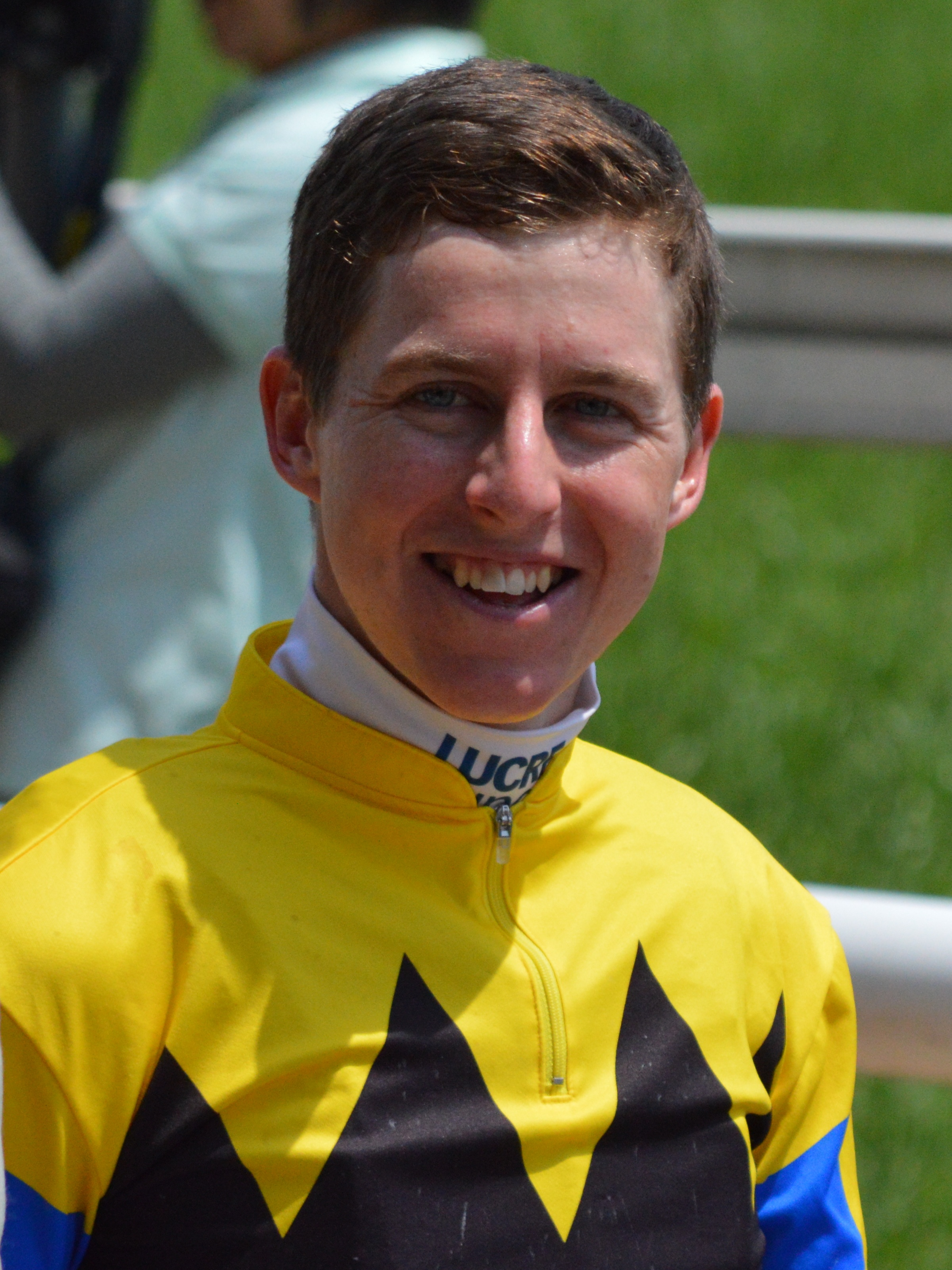
Damian Lane, who won the Victoria Mile on Normcore

Normcore's early form in 2019 was disappointing as she was beaten when favourite for her first two races. She finished strongly in the Grade 3 Aichi Hai at Chukyo Racecourse in January but was beaten half a length by One Breath Away while in the Grade 3 Nakayama Himba Stakes at Nakayama in March she came home seventh in a blanket finish, beaten one and three quarter lengths by the winner Frontier Queen. Of the latter event her trainer Kiyoshi Hagiwara said "She had an inside draw and she couldn't move in places. In the homestretch too, it wouldn't open up for her so she was kept waiting before she could make her move. It was a frustrating race." The filly was partnered by Damian Lane when she returned to Grade 1 class for the Victoria Mile over 1600 metres at Tokyo on 12 May and started the 8.4/1 fifth choice in the betting behind Lucky Lilac, Aerolithe (NHK Mile Cup), Red Olga and Primo Scene (Fairy Stakes). The other thirteen runners included Soul Stirring, Let's Go Donki (Oka Sho), Frontier Queen, Mikki Charm (Hanshin Himba Stakes), Denko Ange (Artemis Stakes) and Crocosmia (Fuchu Himba Stakes). After settling in mid-division behind the front-running Aerolithe, Normcore angled to the outside to make her challenge in the straight. She gained the advantage 100 metres from the line and won by a neck, half a length and a nose from Primo Scene, Crocosmia and Lucky Lilac in a closely-contested finish. The winning time of 1:30.5 was a new track record. Damian Lane commented "she handled the mile great. I think the tempo of the mile really suited her and she traveled lovely and really finished strong. I always felt she was going to finish the race strong and she was going to be right there but I just didn't know whether there were going to be good horses coming from behind but she was good enough to hold them off.”

After a break of five months Normcore returned for the Group 3 Fuji Stakes over 1600 metres at Tokyo in October when she was partnered by Lemaire and started second favourite behind the three-year-old colt Admire Mars. She was not in contention early in the race and was still only twelfth of the eighteen runners on the final turn, but she produced a sustained run on the outside to take the lead in the closing stages and won by half a length from Leyenda. For her final run of the season the filly was sent to contest the Hong Kong Mile at Sha Tin Racecourse in December in which she came home fourth behind Admire Mars, Waikuku and Beauty Generation, beaten two lengths by the winner after keeping on well in the straight.

=== 2020: five-year-old season ===
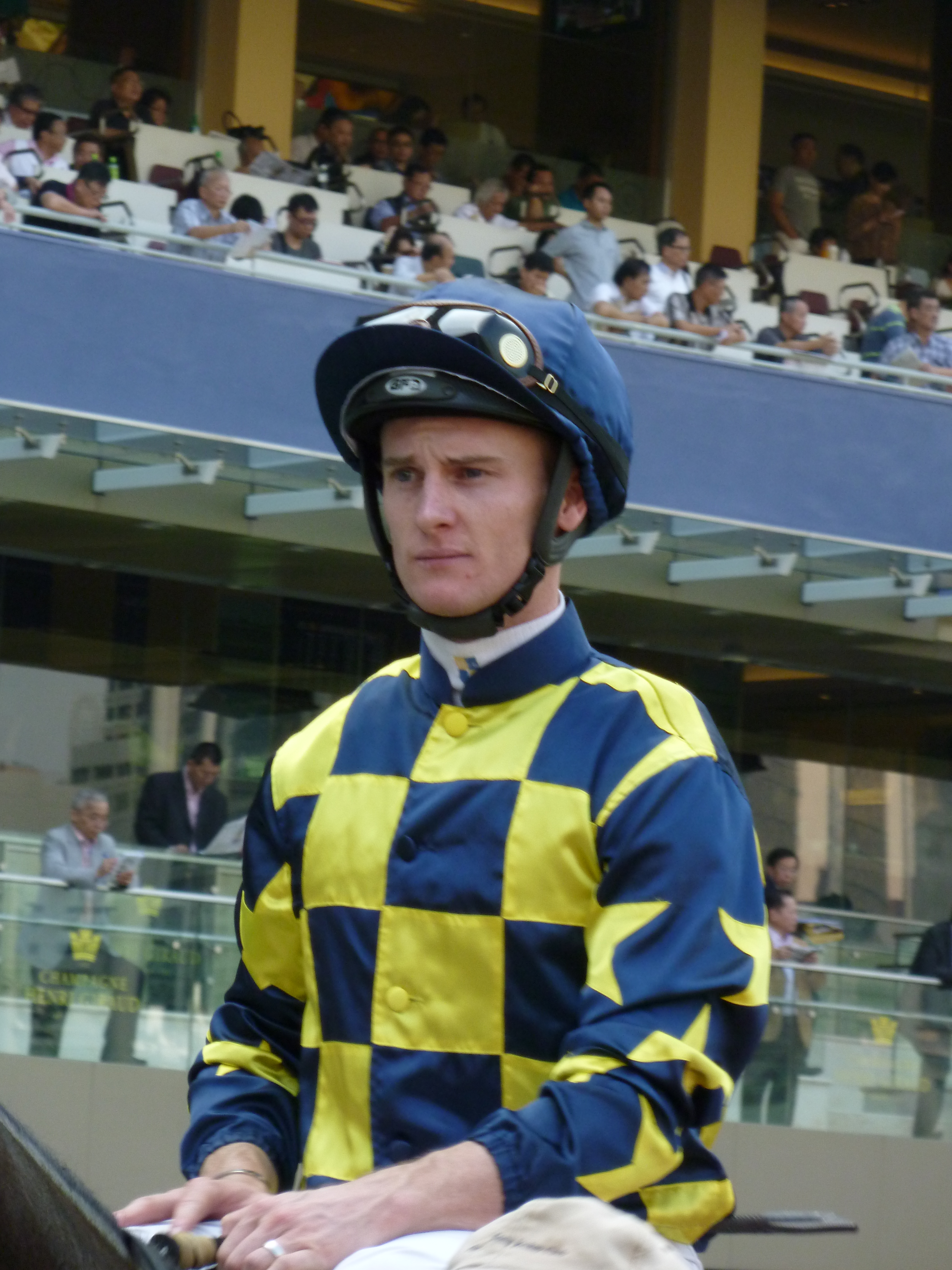
Zac Purton, who rode Normcore to victory in the Hong Kong Cup

The 2020 flat racing season was disrupted by the COVID-19 pandemic and although the sport continued as scheduled in Japan, the races were run behind closed doors. On her first run of 2020 Normcore was dropped back to sprint distances for the Grade 1 Takamatsunomiya Kinen over 1200 metres at Chukyo in March but made little impact and finished unplaced behind Mozu Superflare. On 17 May the mare was ridden by Norihiro Yokoyama when she started a 16.4/1 outsider as she attempted to repeat her 2019 success in the Victoria Mile. She finished strongly but never looked likely to win and finished third behind Almond Eye and Sound Chiara. In the Yasuda Kinen over 1600 metres in June she went off at odds of 49/1 but produced a creditable performance to take fourth place behind Gran Alegria, Almond Eye and Indy Champ after being thirteenth of the fourteen runners on the final turn. After a break of two months Normcore returned to the track at Sapporo Racecourse in August when she started the 1.7/1 second favourite behind Lucky Lilac for the Grade 2 Sapporo Kinen over 2000 metres. With Yokoyama again in the saddle she settled towards the rear of the field before making a forward move approaching the final turn, ran down Lucky Lilac in the straight and held off the late challenge of Persian Knight to win by a length.

At Kyoto in November Normcore started second favourite as she ran for the second time in the Queen Elizabeth II Cup. In a change of tactics she led from the start but after maintaining her advantage into the straight she faded badly and came home sixteenth of the eighteen runners behind Lucky Lilac. In December the mare was sent to Sha Tin again, this time to contest the 2000 metre Hong Kong Cup in which she was ridden by Zac Purton and started at odds of 10/1. Purton had been booked to ride the mare before being replaced by Christophe Soumillon but had been able to resume the engagement when Soumillon, who was coming out of quarantine after testing positive for COVID-19 had a reported "irregularity" in a follow-up swab test. Magical started favourite, while the other six runners were Danon Premium, Win Bright, Furore (Jockey Club Cup), Skalleti (Prix Dollar), Time Warp (winner of the race in 2017) and Dances with Dragon (Premier Plate). After settling towards the rear of the field, Normcore made a sustained run on the outside in the straight, gained the advantage in the final strides and won "quite comfortably" by three quarters of a length from Win Bright, with Magical a short head away in third place. After the race Hagiwara said "I am most grateful, firstly to the owner and the people at the farm, and to everyone who helped us win here. Zac Purton gave her a great ride that brought out her best. Also, I think that all the fans in Japan cheering us on also helped bring home victory as our results. Thank you so much.". Purton, who was winning a record ninth victory in Hong Kong International Races commented "She had to fight for it. Win Bright gave a really good kick and his love for Sha Tin was starting to show through – he was a very hard horse to get past. But she was determined and inch-by-inch she just kept putting herself in the frame and thankfully got there."

Following the Hong Kong Mile, she was retired to become a broodmare at Northern Farm.

== Racing form ==
Normcore won seven races out of 17 starts. This data is based on JBIS, netkeiba and HKJC.

Date	Track	Race	Grade	Distance (Condition)	Entry	HN	Odds (Favored)	Finish	Time	Margins	Jockey	Winner (Runner-up)
2017 – two-year-old season
Jul 16	Fukushima	2yo Newcomer		1,800 m (Firm)	15	4	6.9 (3)	1st	1:49.1	–0.6	Yukito Ishikawa	(Mighty Tesoro)
Sep 9	Nakayama	Aster Sho	ALW (1W)	1,600 m (Firm)	8	7	2.1 (1)	1st	1:35.1	–0.1	Hiroshi Kitamura	(Soil to the Soul)
2018 – three-year-old season
Mar 17	Nakayama	Flower Cup	3	1,800 m (Firm)	13	3	7.4 (4)	3rd	1:49.5	0.3	Hiroshi Kitamura	Cantabile
Apr 22	Tokyo	Flora Stakes	2	2,000 m (Firm)	16	16	7.4 (5)	3rd	1:59.6	0.1	Keita Tosaki	Satono Walkure
Sep 8	Nakayama	Shion Stakes	3	2,000 m (Firm)	16	14	4.2 (2)	1st	1:58.0	–0.5	Christophe Lemaire	(Mau Lea)
Nov 11	Kyoto	QEII Cup	1	2,200 m (Firm)	17	13	3.8 (2)	5th	2:13.7	0.6	Christophe Lemaire	Lys Gracieux
2019 – four-year-old season
Jan 26	Chukyo	Aichi Hai	3	2,000 m (Firm)	14	11	3.0 (1)	2nd	2:00.1	0.1	Christophe Lemaire	One Breath Away
Mar 9	Nakayama	Nakayama Himba Stakes	3	1,800 m (Firm)	14	2	3.4 (1)	7th	1:47.9	0.2	Hironobu Tanabe	Frontier Queen
May 12	Tokyo	Victoria Mile	1	1,600 m (Firm)	18	4	9.4 (5)	1st	R1:30.5	0.0	Damian Lane	(Primo Scene)
Oct 19	Tokyo	Fuji Stakes	3	1,600 m (Good)	18	16	4.8 (2)	1st	1:33.0	–0.1	Christophe Lemaire	(Leyenda)
Dec 8	Sha Tin	Hong Kong Mile	1	1,600 m (Firm)	10	10	5.6 (4)	4th	1:33.6	0.3	Christophe Lemaire	Admire Mars
2020 – five-year-old season
Mar 29	Chukyo	Takamatsunomiya Kinen	1	1,200 m (Soft)	18	18	26.7 (8)	15th	1:10.6	1.9	Norihiro Yokoyama	Mozu Superflare
May 17	Tokyo	Victoria Mile	1	1,600 m (Firm)	16	16	17.4 (5)	3rd	1:31.3	0.7	Norihiro Yokoyama	Almond Eye
Jun 7	Tokyo	Yasuda Kinen	1	1,600 m (Good)	14	3	49.9 (7)	4th	1:32.1	0.5	Norihiro Yokoyama	Gran Alegria
Aug 23	Sapporo	Sapporo Kinen	2	2,000 m (Firm)	12	1	3.7 (2)	1st	1:59.4	–0.2	Norihiro Yokoyama	(Persian Knight)
Nov 15	Hanshin	QEII Cup	1	2,200 m (Firm)	18	6	3.8 (2)	16th	2:11.6	1.3	Norihiro Yokoyama	Lucky Lilac
Dec 13	Sha Tin	Hong Kong Cup	1	2,000 m (Firm)	8	8	5.7 (4)	1st	2:00.5	–0.1	Zac Purton	(Win Bright)

Legend:
Turf

- R indicated that it was a record time finish

== Breeding career ==
As a broodmare, she has foaled 4 progenies as of February 2026, two of which have debuted. Her most successful foal is Dream Core, who won the 2026 Queen Cup.

== Pedigree ==
Pedigree of Normcore (JPN), grey mare 2015
Sire Harbinger (GB) 2006	Dansili (GB); 1996	Danehill (USA)	Danzig
Sire Harbinger (GB) 2006	Dansili (GB); 1996	Danehill (USA)	Razyana
Sire Harbinger (GB) 2006	Dansili (GB); 1996	Hasili (IRE)	Kahyasi
Sire Harbinger (GB) 2006	Dansili (GB); 1996	Hasili (IRE)	Kerali (GB)
Sire Harbinger (GB) 2006	Penang Pearl (FR); 1996	Bering (GB)	Arctic Tern (USA)
Sire Harbinger (GB) 2006	Penang Pearl (FR); 1996	Bering (GB)	Beaune (FR)
Sire Harbinger (GB) 2006	Penang Pearl (FR); 1996	Guapa (GB)	Shareef Dancer (USA)
Sire Harbinger (GB) 2006	Penang Pearl (FR); 1996	Guapa (GB)	Sauceboat
Dam Chronologist (JPN) 2003	Kurofune (USA); 1998	French Deputy	Deputy Minister (CAN)
Dam Chronologist (JPN) 2003	Kurofune (USA); 1998	French Deputy	Mitterand
Dam Chronologist (JPN) 2003	Kurofune (USA); 1998	Blue Avenue	Classic Go Go
Dam Chronologist (JPN) 2003	Kurofune (USA); 1998	Blue Avenue	Eliza Blue
Dam Chronologist (JPN) 2003	In This Unison (JPN); 1997	Sunday Silence (USA)	Halo
Dam Chronologist (JPN) 2003	In This Unison (JPN); 1997	Sunday Silence (USA)	Wishing Well
Dam Chronologist (JPN) 2003	In This Unison (JPN); 1997	Rustic Belle (USA)	Mr Prospector
Dam Chronologist (JPN) 2003	In This Unison (JPN); 1997	Rustic Belle (USA)	Ragtime Girl (Family: 20-a)
