= Soul Stirring =

Japanese-bred Thoroughbred racehorse

Soul Stirring; ソウルスターリング
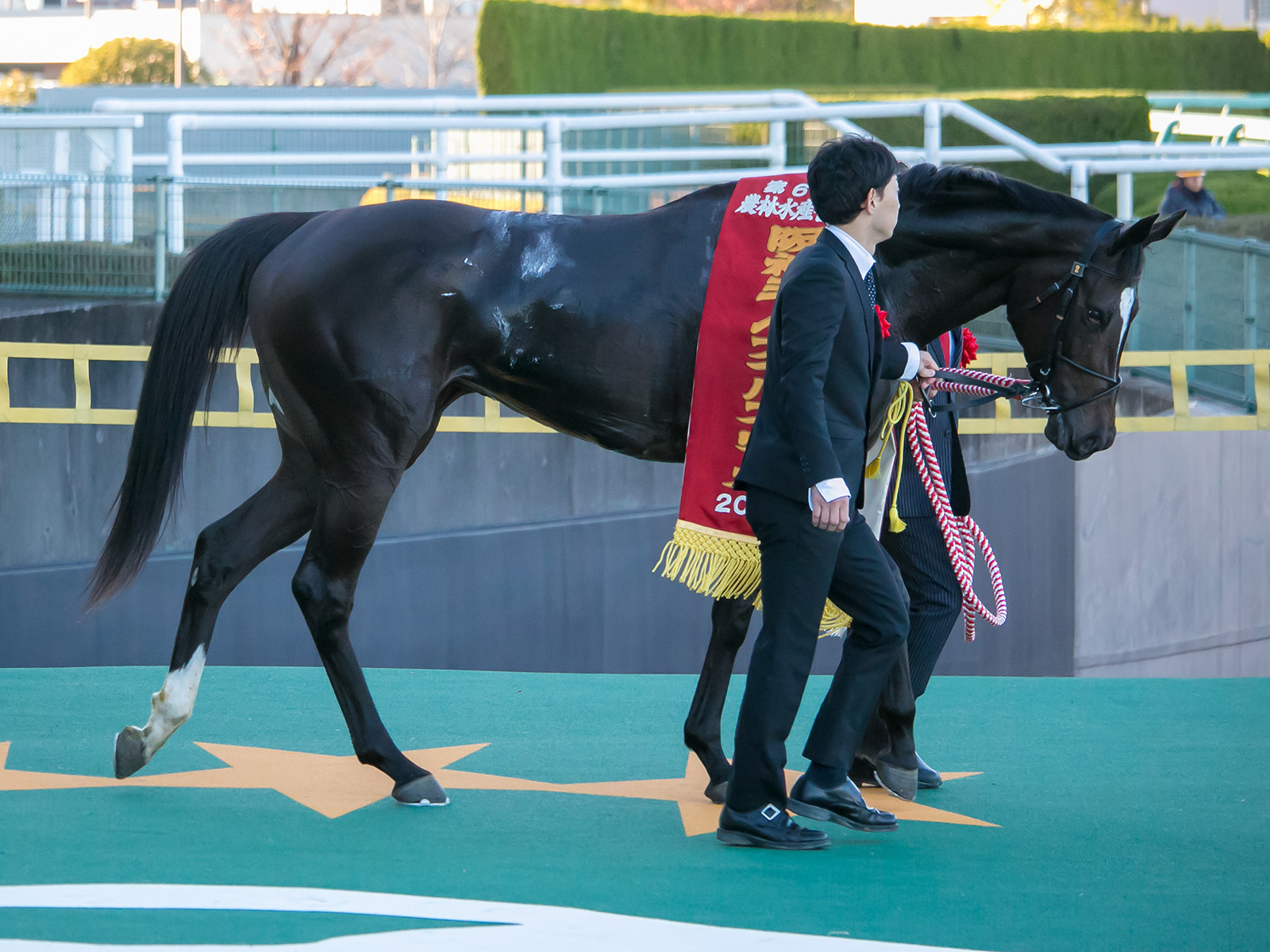
- Soul Stirring in December 2016
- Sire: Frankel
- Grandsire: Galileo
- Dam: Stacelita
- Damsire: Monsun
- Sex: Mare
- Foaled: 13 February 2014
- Country: Japan
- Colour: Bay or brown
- Breeder: Shadai Farm
- Owner: Shadai Racing Co. Ltd.
- Racing colours
- Trainer: Kazuo Fujisawa
- Jockey: Christophe Lemaire
- Record: 16: 5-0-3
- Earnings: ¥303,323,000

Major wins
- Hanshin Juvenile Fillies (2016); Tulip Sho (2017); Japanese Classic Tiara Race wins: Yushun Himba (2017)

Awards
- JRA Award for Best Two-Year-Old Filly (2016); JRA Award for Best Three-Year-Old Filly (2017)
- Last updated on 1 March 2026

Soul Stirring (Japanese: ソウルスターリング, foaled 13 February 2014) is a former Japanese Thoroughbred racehorse and current broodmare. As a two-year-old in 2016 she won the JRA Award for Best Two-Year-Old Filly after winning all three of her races including the Grade 1 Hanshin Juvenile Fillies. In the following year she took the Tulip Sho and ran third in the Oka Sho before taking the Yushun Himba and was again rated the best of her age and sex in Japan, winning the JRA Award for Best Three-Year-Old Filly. She remained in training for two more seasons but failed to win again.

== Background ==
Soul Stirring is a brown mare with a white blaze and a white sock on her left hind leg bred in Hokkaido by the Yoshida family's Shadai Group. She was sent into training with Kazuo Fujisawa.

She was from the first crop of foals sired by Frankel, an undefeated racehorse whose other progeny have included Cracksman and Without Parole. Soul Stirring was the second foal of Stacelita, a multiple Group 1 winner in both Europe and the United States. As a descendant of the German mare Schonbrunn (foaled 1966) she was closely related to many other major winners including Sagace, Zagreb and Steinlen.

== Racing career ==
=== 2016: two-year-old season ===
Soul Stirring began her racing career by winning a race for newcomers over 1800 metres at Sapporo Racecourse on 31 July 2016. On 22 October the filly returned for the Ivy Stakes at Tokyo Racecourse and won from Persian Knight, a colt who went on to win the Mile Championship. The filly was then stepped up to Group 1 class for the Hanshin Juvenile Fillies over 1600 metres at Hanshin Racecourse in which she was ridden by Christophe Lemaire started the 1.8/1 favourite against eighteen opponents. Soul Stirring tracked the leaders before going to the front in the straight and won by one and a quarter lengths from the Artemis Stakes winner Lys Gracieux. Lemaire commented "I’m ecstatic. It's so special because I used to also ride her dam Stacelita... I was confident from the beginning and we were in a good position and she was relaxed. She easily hit the front at the stretch and with her big strides and stamina; I think she can go a little bit further in distance".

Soul Stirring won the JRA Award for Best Two-Year-Old Filly, taking 290 of the 291 votes.

=== 2017: three-year-old season ===
Soul Stirring began her second season in the Tulip Sho at Hanshin on 4 March when she started odds-on favourite and won by two lengths from the 52/1 outsider Miss Panthere with Lys Gracieux in third. On 9 April, Soul Stirring was made 2/5 favourite for the Grade 1 Oka Sho over the same course and distance. Racing on soft ground she raced in mid division, but despite making progress in the straight she was beaten into third place behind Reine Minoru and Lys Gracieux. Lemaire explained "The track condition was against her and she kept changing leads. She wasn’t able to show her true form in this race".

In the Yushun Himba over 2400 metre at Tokyo Soul Stirring was partnered by Lemaire and started the 1.4/1 favourite in an 18-runner field which included Lys Gracieux, Reine Minoru, Admire Miyabi (Queen Cup), Mozu Katchan (Flora Stakes) and Deirdre. Soul Stirring raced just behind the leaders along the inside rail before switching to the right to make her challenge in the straight. She gained the advantage in the straight and won comfortably by one and three quarter lengths from Mozu Katchan. After the race Lemaire said "Soul Stirring certainly has inherited the power both from her sire (Frankel) and her dam. I was quite confident coming into this race. I wasn't sure yet about the distance as it was her first time (at 2,400m) so I wanted her in a good position which I did because she is quick out of the gate. She also has a good lasting speed so I was able to give her the go from early at the stretch and sustain our bid right up to the finish".

After a summer break Soul Stirring returned in autumn for three races in which she was matched against older horses and male opposition. In October she ran eighth behind Real Steel when favourite for the Mainichi Okan and then came home sixth to Kitasan Black in the autumn edition of the Tenno Sho. On her final run of the season Soul Stirring came home seventh of the seventeen runners behind Cheval Grand in the Japan Cup at Tokyo on 26 November.

In January 2018, Soul Stirring won the JRA Award for Best Three-Year-Old Filly, beating Mozu Katchan by 162 votes to 120.

=== 2018 & 2019: four- and five-year-old seasons ===
Soul Stirring remained in training as a four-year-old in 2018. She began her campaign by running unplaced behind Miss Panthere in the Hanshin Himba Stakes over 1600 metres on 7 April and then came home seventh to Jour Polaire in the Victoria Mile over the same distance at Tokyo on 13 May. The Queen Stakes over 1800 metres at Sapporo on 29 July saw Soul Stirring earn her first prize money of the year as she finished third to Deirdre and Frontier Queen. She returned after the summer break for the Fuchu Himba at Tokyo on 13 October but ran poorly and finished tenth of the thirteen runners behind Deirdre.

On her first and only run as a five-year-old Soul Stirring ran unplaced behind Normcore in the Victoria Mile on 12 May.

=== 2020: six-year-old season ===
Soul Stirring came back for this season at the Nakayama Kinen with Hiroshi Kitamura at the reins again. She was the sixth favorite out of nine horses. When the race started, she ran in second place, chasing the leading horse, Maltese Apogee. She was overtaken by the winner in the straight, but held on to the front group and finished in third place.

Her next race would be the Nikkei Sho which would eventually being her last career race. In this race, she was closed to attain the lead at the third corner but lost the pace and fallen behind to 13th-place in the end. After the race, she would be retired from racing, terminated from the registry and assigned to be a broodmare at Shadai Farm in Chitose, Hokkaido.

== Racing form ==
Soul Stirring won five races and placed in third place thrice out of 16 starts. This data is available in JBIS and netkeiba.

Date	Track	Race	Grade	Distance (Condition)	Entry	HN	Odds (Favored)	Finish	Time	Margins	Jockey	Winner (Runner-up)
2016 – two-year-old season
Jul 31	Sapporo	2yo Newcomer		1,800 m (Firm)	8	3	1.7 (1)	1st	1:51.4	0.0	Christophe Lemaire	(Admire Mambai)
Oct 22	Tokyo	Ivy Stakes	OP	1,800 m (Firm)	9	7	2.5 (2)	1st	1:48.9	–0.3	Christophe Lemaire	(Persian Knight)
Dec 11	Hanshin	Hanshin Juvenile Fillies	1	1,600 m (Firm)	18	2	2.8 (1)	1st	1:34.0	–0.2	Christophe Lemaire	(Lys Gracieux)
2017 – three-year-old season
Mar 4	Hanshin	Tulip Sho	3	1,600 m (Firm)	12	10	1.5 (1)	1st	1:33.2	–0.3	Christophe Lemaire	(Miss Panthere)
Apr 9	Hanshin	Oka Sho	1	1,600 m (Good)	17	14	1.4 (1)	3rd	1:34.6	0.1	Christophe Lemaire	Reine Minoru
May 21	Tokyo	Yushun Himba	1	2,400 m (Firm)	18	2	2.4 (1)	1st	2:24.1	–0.3	Christophe Lemaire	(Mozu Katchan)
Oct 8	Tokyo	Mainichi Okan	2	1,800 m (Firm)	12	1	2.0 (1)	8th	1:46.1	0.5	Christophe Lemaire	Real Steel
Oct 29	Tokyo	Tenno Sho (Autumn)	1	2,000 m (Heavy)	18	9	9.4 (4)	6th	2:09.7	1.4	Christophe Lemaire	Kitasan Black
Nov 26	Tokyo	Japan Cup	1	2,400 m (Firm)	17	8	9.3 (4)	7th	2:24.9	1.2	Cristian Demuro	Cheval Grand
2018 – four-year-old season
Apr 7	Hanshin	Hanshin Himba Stakes	2	1,600 m (Firm)	13	6	3.6 (2)	10th	1:35.4	0.6	Christophe Lemaire	Miss Panthere
May 13	Tokyo	Victoria Mile	1	1,600 m (Good)	18	9	11.4 (5)	7th	1:32.7	0.4	Christophe Lemaire	Jour Polaire
Jul 29	Sapporo	Queen Stakes	3	1,800 m (Firm)	11	2	4.5 (2)	3rd	1:46.7	0.5	Hiroshi Kitamura	Deirdre
Oct 13	Tokyo	Ireland Trophy	2	1,800 m (Firm)	11	3	7.7 (3)	10th	1:45.9	1.2	Hiroshi Kitamura	Deirdre
2019 – five-year-old season
May 12	Tokyo	Victoria Mile	1	1,600 m (Firm)	18	16	21.6 (8)	9th	1:31.2	0.7	Yutaka Take	Normcore
Jun 9	Tokyo	Epsom Cup	3	1,800 m (Good)	13	10	–	Scratched	–	–	Yutaka Take	Leyenda
Oct 14	Tokyo	Ireland Trophy	2	1,800 m (Good)	15	9	–	Scratched	–	–	Ikuya Kowata	Scarlet Color
2020 – six-year-old season
Mar 1	Nakayama	Nakayama Kinen	2	1,800 m (Firm)	9	4	38.6 (6)	3rd	1:46.6	0.3	Hiroshi Kitamura	Danon Kingly
Mar 28	Nakayama	Nikkei Sho	2	2,500 m (Firm)	14	7	13.6 (7)	13th	2:35.7	2.8	Genki Maruyama	Mikki Swallow

Legend:
Turf

== Pedigree ==
Pedigree of Soul Stirring (JPN), bay filly, 2014
Sire Frankel (GB) 2008	Galileo (IRE); 1998	Sadler's Wells (USA)	Northern Dancer
Sire Frankel (GB) 2008	Galileo (IRE); 1998	Sadler's Wells (USA)	Fairy Bridge
Sire Frankel (GB) 2008	Galileo (IRE); 1998	Urban Sea (USA)	Miswaki
Sire Frankel (GB) 2008	Galileo (IRE); 1998	Urban Sea (USA)	Allegretta
Sire Frankel (GB) 2008	Kind (IRE); 2001	Danehill (USA)	Danzig
Sire Frankel (GB) 2008	Kind (IRE); 2001	Danehill (USA)	Razyana
Sire Frankel (GB) 2008	Kind (IRE); 2001	Rainbow Lake (GB)	Rainbow Quest
Sire Frankel (GB) 2008	Kind (IRE); 2001	Rainbow Lake (GB)	Rockfest
Dam Stacelita (FR) 2006	Monsun (GER); 1990	Königsstuhl	Dschingis Khan
Dam Stacelita (FR) 2006	Monsun (GER); 1990	Königsstuhl	Königskrönung
Dam Stacelita (FR) 2006	Monsun (GER); 1990	Mosella	Surumu
Dam Stacelita (FR) 2006	Monsun (GER); 1990	Mosella	Monasia
Dam Stacelita (FR) 2006	Soignee (GER); 2002	Dashing Blade (GB)	Elegant Air
Dam Stacelita (FR) 2006	Soignee (GER); 2002	Dashing Blade (GB)	Sharp Castan
Dam Stacelita (FR) 2006	Soignee (GER); 2002	Suivez (FR)	Fioravanti (USA)
Dam Stacelita (FR) 2006	Soignee (GER); 2002	Suivez (FR)	Sea Symphony (GB) (Family: 16-c)
