= Damian Lane =

Australian jockey (born 1994)

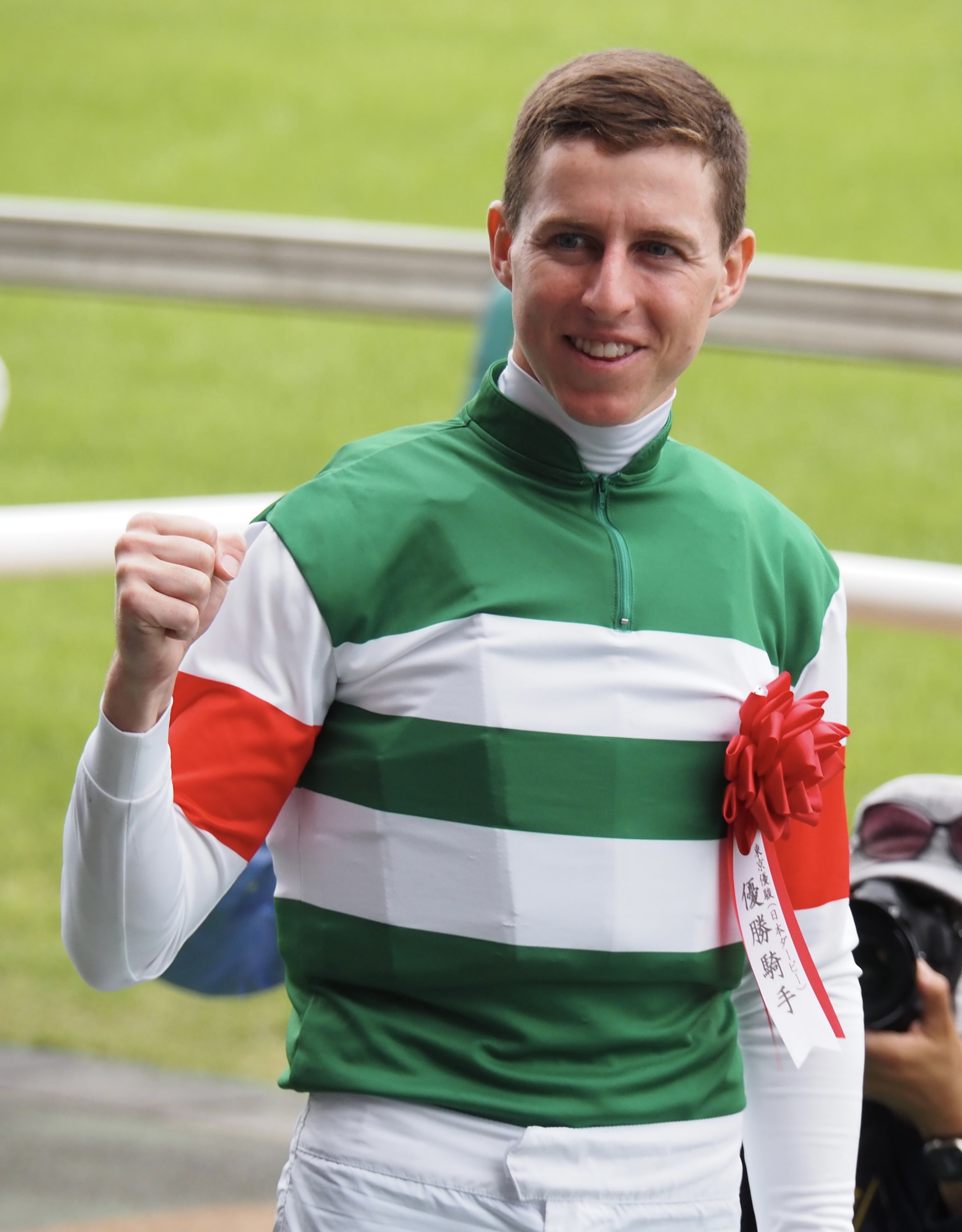
- Lane after winning the 2023 Japanese Derby

Personal information
- Nickname: Frosty
- Nationality: Australian
- Born: 6 February 1994 (age 32) Bunbury, Western Australia
- Occupation: Jockey
- Height: 166 cm (5 ft 5 in)
- Weight: 53 kg (117 lb)

Horse racing career
- Sport: Horse racing

Damian Mitchell Lane (born 6 February 1994) is an Australian jockey based in Victoria.

Lane was born in Bunbury in Western Australia to Michael and Vickey Lane, who were both horse trainers. He grew up around horses, and began his career in Western Australia in 2009, and later moved to Victoria. His first Group One winner was Trust In A Gust in the 2014 Sir Rupert Clarke Stakes at Caulfield. As of early January 2026, he has ridden 1,601 winners, including 36 in Group One races.

Lane spent three months in Japan from April to July 2019, riding 37 winners, including his first Japanese Grade 1 victory at the Victoria Mile with Normcore, and spent another three months there between April and July 2020, riding 41 winners. In 2019 in the Melbourne spring racing carnival he rode the Japanese-trained horses Mer De Glace and Lys Gracieux in their respective Caulfield Cup and W. S. Cox Plate wins.

Lane returned to Japan in 2022 where he marked his 100th Japanese race win on June 19 with Rain From Heaven. In 2023, he won the Japanese Derby with Tastiera, making him the first jockey from the Southern Hemisphere to win a Japanese classic race.

== Major wins ==
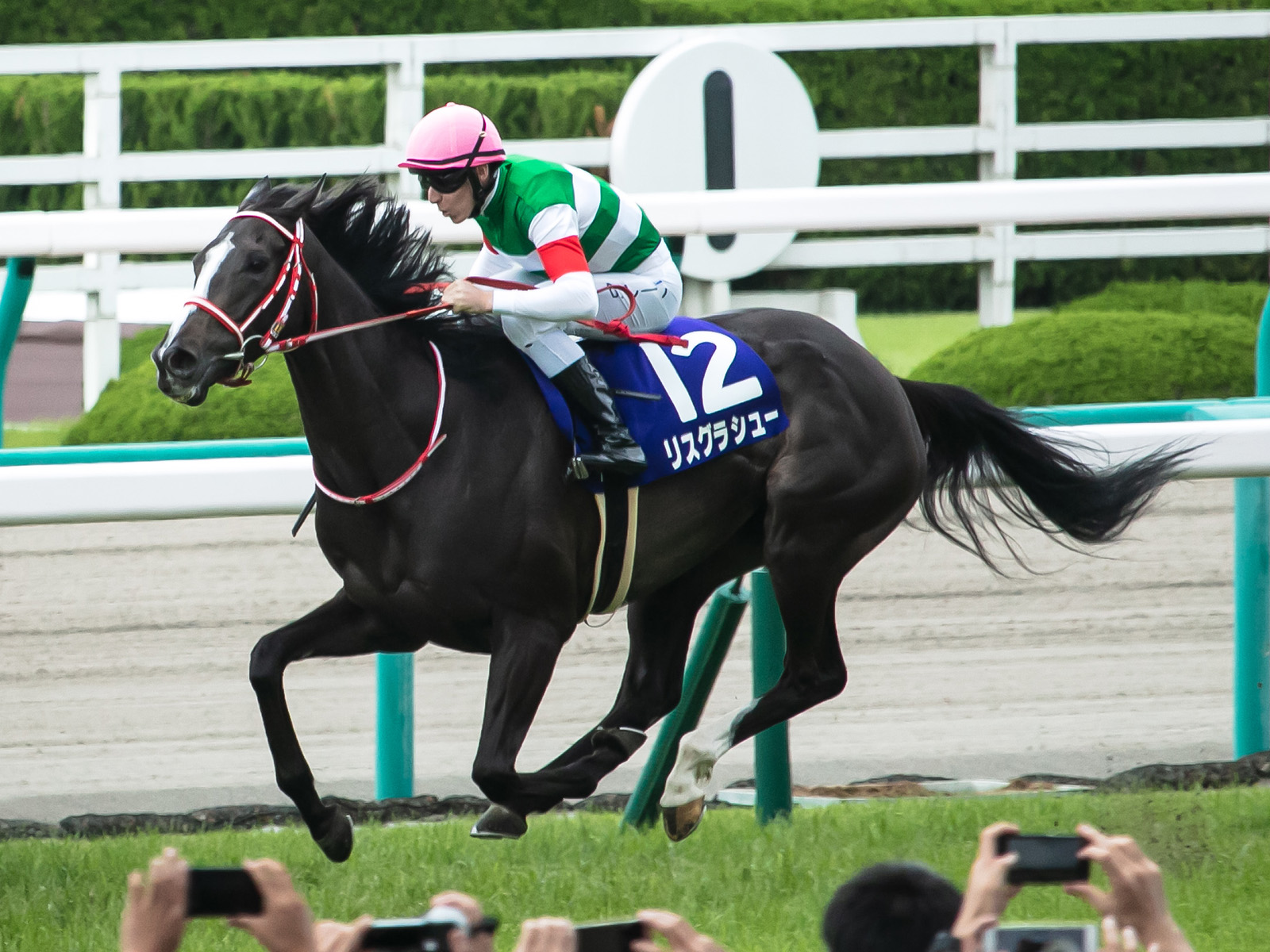
Lane and Lys Gracieux winning the 60th Takarazuka Kinen (2019)

Australia

- Australian Cup - (1) - Humidor (2017)
- Australian Derby - (2) - Jon Snow (2017), Aeliana (2025)
- Australian Oaks - (3) - El Patroness (2022), Pennyweka (2023), Treasurethe Moment (2025)
- C F Orr Stakes - (1) - Jacquinot (2023)
- Caulfield Cup - (1) - Mer De Glace (2019)
- Caulfield Guineas - (2) - Private Life (2024), Autumn Boy (2025)
- Champagne Stakes - (1) - The Mission (2017)
- Futurity Stakes - (1) - Probabeel (2021)
- Golden Rose Stakes - (1) - Jacquinot (2022)
- Golden Slipper Stakes - (2) - Kiamichi (2019), Marhoona (2025)
- Makybe Diva Stakes - (1) - Humidor (2017)
- Memsie Stakes - (2) - Humidor (2018), Treasurethe Moment (2025)
- Moir Stakes - (1) - Pippie (2020)
- Kennedy Oaks - (1) - Aristia (2018)
- Kingston Town Classic - (1) - Stratum Star (2016)
- Newmarket Handicap - (1) - Joliestar (2025)
- Oakleigh Plate - (1) - Flamberge (2016)
- Sir Rupert Clarke Stakes - (1) - Trust In A Gust (2014)
- Sires' Produce Stakes - (1) - El Dorado Dreaming (2018)
- South Australian Derby - (1) - Leicester (2018)
- Toorak Handicap - (2) - Tosen Stardom (2017), Land Of Plenty (2018)
- Turnbull Stakes - (1) - Via Sistina (2024)
- Vinery Stud Stakes - (1) - Treasurethe Moment (2025)
- VRC Champions Mile - (1) - Yulong Prince (2020)
- VRC Champions Stakes - (1) - Tosen Stardom (2017)
- VRC Oaks - (1) - Treasurethe Moment (2024)
- W. S. Cox Plate - (1) - Lys Gracieux (2019)

Hong Kong

- Hong Kong Vase - (1) - Win Marilyn (2022)
- Queen Elizabeth II Cup - (1) - Tastiera (2025)

Japan

- Arima Kinen - (1) - Lys Gracieux (2019)
- Mile Championship - (1) - Serifos (2022)
- NHK Mile Cup - (1) - Rodeo Drive (2026)
- Takarazuka Kinen - (1) - Lys Gracieux (2019)
- Teio Sho - (1) - Omega Perfume (2019)
- Tenno Sho (Spring) - (1) - Redentor (2025)
- Japanese Derby - (1) - Tastiera (2023)
- Victoria Mile - (1) - Normcore (2019)
