= Deirdre (horse) =

Japanese Thoroughbred racehorse

Deirdre; ディアドラ
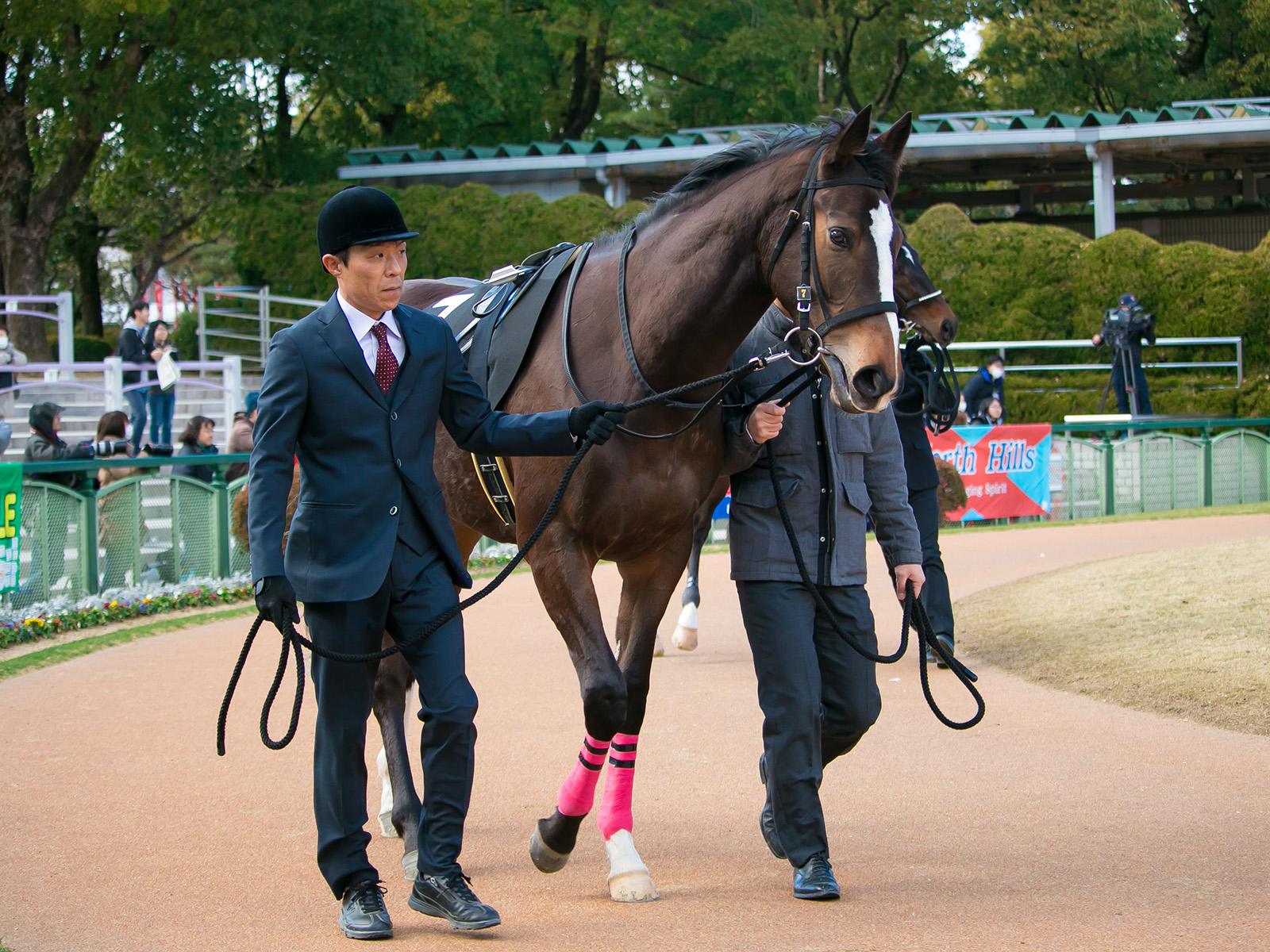
- Deirdre in 2017
- Sire: Harbinger
- Grandsire: Dansili
- Dam: Reizend
- Damsire: Special Week
- Sex: Mare
- Foaled: 4 April 2014
- Country: Japan
- Colour: Bay
- Breeder: Northern Farm
- Owner: Touji Morita
- Racing colours
- Trainer: Mitsuru Hoshida
- Jockey: Christophe Lemaire; Oisin Murphy
- Record: 33: 8-5-4
- Earnings: ¥571,601,900; 295,797,000 JPY; 7,780,000 HKD; 503,311.5 GBP; 62,500 EUR $950,000 UAE

Major wins
- Shion Stakes (2017); Queen Stakes (2018); Fuchu Himba Stakes (2018); Nassau Stakes (2019); Japanese Classic Tiara Race wins: Shuka Sho (2017)

Deirdre (Japanese: ディアドラ, Hepburn: Diadora; foaled 4 April 2014) is a retired Japanese Thoroughbred racehorse. As a two-year-old she raced six times, winning one minor race and running third in the Fantasy Stakes. In the following year she developed into a top-class performer in autumn as she took the Shion Stakes and Shuka Sho. As a four-year-old she won the Queen Stakes and the Fuchu Himba Stakes as well as being placed in both the Dubai Turf and the Hong Kong Cup. In 2019 she became the first Japan-trained horse in 19 years to win a major race in the United Kingdom when she won the Nassau Stakes. She retired from racing in November 2020 at the end of a season in which she did not win a race. Over her career she raced in eight countries.

== Background ==
Deirdre is a bay mare with a white blaze and white socks on her hind legs bred in Hokkaido by Northern Farm. As a yearling she was consigned to the 2015 Select Sale and was bought for 22,680,000 JPY by Touji Morita. The filly was sent into training with Mitsuru Hoshida.

She was from the third crop of foals sired by Harbinger, a British horse who was rated the best racehorse in the world in 2010 when he won the King George VI and Queen Elizabeth Stakes by eleven lengths. Since retiring to stud in Japan, his other foals have included Normcore, Blast Onepiece, Mozu Katchan (Queen Elizabeth II Cup) and Persian Knight (Mile Championship).

Deirdre's dam Reizend showed very little racing ability, failing to win in four starts but was a half-sister to the dam of Logi Universe, and a granddaughter of the outstanding racemare Sonic Lady. Sonic Lady was not, technically, a Thoroughbred as her female ancestry could not be traced to one of the foundation mares of the breed. She was a product of the half-bred Verdict family, whose ancestry could be traced no further back than an unnamed Perion mare foaled in 1837. So many non-thoroughbreds from this family won major races that the descendants of the Perion mare were admitted to the General Stud Book in 1969 as Half-Bred Family 3. Members of this family include Quashed, Attraction and Sonic Lady's great-grandmother Lucasland, the winner of the July Cup in 1966.

== Racing career ==
=== 2016: two-year-old season ===
Deirdre began her track career by running second in a maiden race over 1400 metres at Chukyo Racecourse on 2 July and then finished fourth in a similar event over 1600 metres at the same track three weeks later. After a summer break she returned on 15 October to record her first victory in a maiden over 1400 metres at Niigata Racecourse. The filly was stepped up in class for the Grade 3 for the Fantasy Stakes at Kyoto Racecourse and came home third of the twelve runners, beaten one and a half lengths and a head by Mi Suerte and Show Way. In her two subsequent races that year Deirdre, finished fourth in the Shiragiku Sho at Kyoto on 27 November and second in the Tsuwabuki Sho at Chukyo on 17 December.

=== 2017: three-year-old season ===
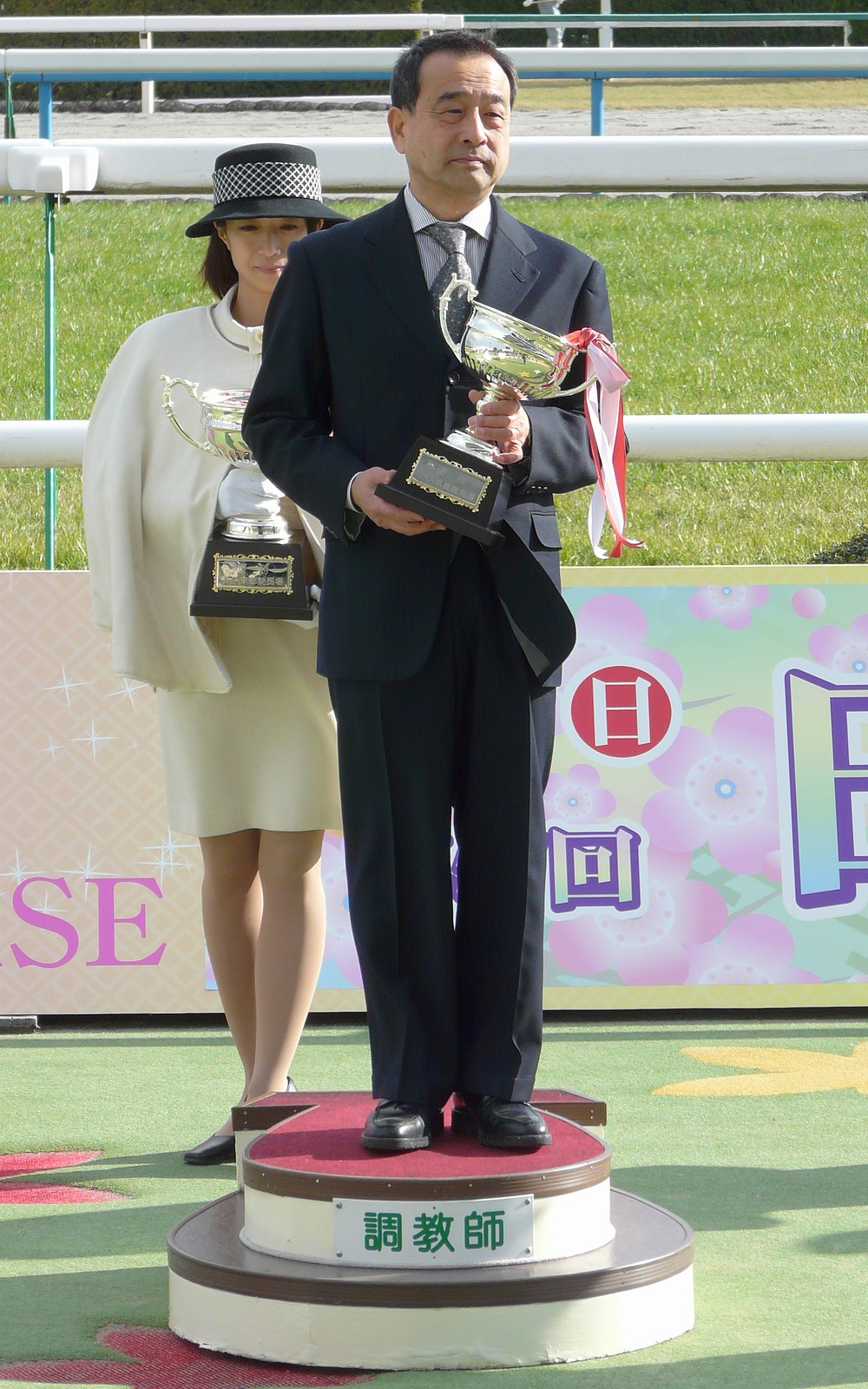
Deirdre's trainer Mitsuru Hashida

Deirdre began her three-year-old season by running third in the Kobushi Sho at Kyoto in February and then finished second to Rising Reason in the Listed Anemone Stakes at Nakayama Racecourse in March. In the Grade 1 Oka Sho at Hanshin Racecourse on 9 April, she started at odds of more than 207/1 but exceeded expectations as she produced a strong late run to finish sixth behind Reine Minoru, beaten less than three lengths behind the winner. After winning the Yaguruma Sho at Kyoto on 7 May, Deirdre finished fourth to Soul Stirring, Mozu Katchan and Admire Miyabi in the Yushun Himba two weeks later.

After a break of over two and a half months, Deirdre returned in August with a win in the HTB Sho over 2000 metres at Sapporo Racecourse. At Nakayama on 9 September, the filly started favourite for the Grade 3 Shion Stakes, a race which serves as a trial race for the Shuka Sho. Ridden as in most of her previous starts by Yasunari Iwata, she came from eleventh place on the final turn to win by a nose from Caribbean Gold, with Port Vendres a further nose away in third place.

Christophe Lemaire took the ride when Deirdre contested the Grade 1 Shuka Sho over 2000 metres at Kyoto on 15 October and was made the 5.3/1 third choice in the betting, behind Aerolithe (NHK Mile Cup) and Fan Dii Na (Flower Cup). The other fifteen runners included Lys Gracieux (second in the Oka Sho), Mozu Katchan, Rabbit Run (Rose Stakes), Reine Minoru and Caribbean Gold. Deirdre started slowly and raced towards the rear before making progress approaching the final turn. She was angled to the left in the straight and produced a strong late run to take the lead inside the last 100 metres and win by one and a quarter lengths and a nose from Lys Gracieux and Mozu Katchan. After the race Lemaire said "I think the filly was in top condition today, she was on her toes in the post parade which just shows how keen she was to go out there and run, and I was quite confident going into this race. Her break wasn't good and we had to race further back than we had hoped but the pace was fast which worked for us and she gave a terrific run in the stretch".

On her final run of the year Deirdre ended her season in the Queen Elizabeth II Cup at Kyoto in November in which she was matched against older fillies and mare. She made some late progress but never looked likely to win and came home twelfth of the eighteen runners behind Mozu Katchan.

In January 2018, Deirdre finished fourth behind Soul Stirring, Mozu Katchan and Aerolithe in the polling for the JRA Award for Best Three-Year-Old Filly. In the official Japanese rankings she was rated level with Mozu Katchan, two pounds behind Soul Stirring who was the top-rated three-year-old filly.

=== 2018: four-year-old season ===
On her first run of 2018 Deirdre took on male opposition and came home sixth behind the four-year-old colt Clincher in the Grade 2 Kyoto Kinen over 2200 metres on 11 February. She was then sent to the United Arab Emirates to contest the Dubai Turf over 1800 metres at Meydan Racecourse on 31 March. Starting a 20/1 outsider she raced in mid-division before staying on strongly in the straight to finish third behind Benbatl and Vivlos.

On her return to Japan the filly started favourite for the Queen Stakes over 1800 metres at Sapporo on 29 July and produced a strong late run on the outside to win by three lengths from Frontier Queen with Soul Stirring a neck away in third. After a late summer break Deirdre returned to the track for the Grade 2 Fuchu Himba Stakes at Tokyo on 15 October and started the 1.3/1 favourite ahead of ten opponents including Lys Gracieux, Soul Stirring, Jour Polaire (Victoria Mile), Crocosmia (winner of the race in 2017) and Frontier Queen. With Lemaire in the saddle she raced towards the rear of the field before making steady progress in the straight and ran down Lys Gracieux in the final strides to win by a neck. Deirdre ended her season with a trip to Hong Kong to contest the Hong Kong Cup over 2000 metres at Sha Tin Racecourse. Starting the 1.8/1 favourite she kept on well in the straight but went down by a length to the front-running Glorious Forever.

In January 2019 Deirdre finished runner-up to Lys Gracieux in the voting to determine the JRA Award for Best Older Filly or Mare at the JRA Awards for 2018. In the official Japanese rankings she was rated level with Aerolithe, one pound behind Lys Gracieux who was the top-rated older female horse.

=== 2019: five-year-old season ===
Deirdre began her fourth season in the Grade 2 Nakayama Kinen over 1800 metres on 24 February when she started favourite but came home sixth of the eleven runners behind Win Bright. After her defeat at Nakayama, the mare embarked on an international campaign. At Meydan in March she ran for the second time in the Dubai Turf and ran fourth to Almond Eye, Vivlos and Lord Glitters. In April at Sha Tin she started a 20/1 outsider for the Queen Elizabeth II Cup over 2000 metres and kept on well without ever looking likely to win to take sixth place, four and a quarter lengths behind the winner Win Bright.

In the summer of 2019, Deirdre was sent to race in England. On 19 June at Royal Ascot she started the 33/1 outsider of the eight runners for the Prince of Wales's Stakes and finished sixth behind Crystal Ocean in a race run on soft ground in heavy rain. Mitsura Hoshida commented "The rain right before the race really hurt us... She just ran out of gas in the end and it got tough for her... she left everything out there. We couldn’t have asked for more out of her." At Goodwood Racecourse on 1 August Deirdre was partnered by Oisin Murphy when she went off at odds of 20/1 for the Group 1 Nassau Stakes over ten furlongs. She was attempting to become the first horse trained in Japan to win in the United Kingdom since Agnes World won the July Cup in 2000. Her eight opponents included Hermosa, Mehdaayih (Prix de Malleret), Maqsad (Pretty Polly Stakes), Channel (Prix de Diane) Sun Maiden (Hoppings Stakes) and Nyaleti (German 1,000 Guineas). After being restrained towards the rear of the field Deirdre began to make progress on the inside on the final turn but looked unlikely to find a clear passage until the front running Mehdaayih hung left entering the final furlong. The Japanese mare produced a late challenge to take the lead in the closing stages and won by one and a quarter lengths. Her trainer's daughter Seiko Hashida Yoshimura said "It was a glorious day and everything just fell right for her. Goodwood is very different to Japanese racecourses, which are usually oval-shaped [but] we were sure that she would like this track and it worked out very well. The quicker ground was another important factor for her today and it is very special to win a Group One event in Britain". Murphy commented "You can see she is an absolute queen. She is a big, masculine type of a horse and I'm not surprised she was able to carry the 60 kilos which is more than what she is used to".

Murphy partnered Deirdre in the mare's three remaining races of 2019. In September she was sent to Ireland for the Irish Champion Stakes at Leopardstown and finished fourth behind Magical after a "terribly unlucky" run which saw her repeatedly blocked as she attempted to obtain a clear run. In the Champion Stakes at Ascot in October she stayed on well in the straight to take third place behind Magical and Addeybb. As in the previous year, Deirdre ended her campaign in Hong Kong where she contested the Hong Kong Vase on 8 December and produced a sustained run from the rear of the field to finish fourth behind Glory Vase, Lucky Lilac and Exultant.

=== 2020: six-year-old season ===
On 29 February Deirdre started as favourite in the first race to be held on the newly-laid turf track at King Abdulaziz Racetrack in Riyadh. Ridden by her regular jockey Oisin Murphy, she came a close second to Port Lions. After the race she returned to her base in Newmarket, with trainer Mitsuru Hashidare saying that the ultimate aim of the season was the Prix de l'Arc de Triomphe.

Deirdre's first race of the season in England was the Eclipse Stakes at Sandown Park in July, where she finished third behind Ghaiyyath and Enable. Later that month she came seventh of seven runners in the Nassau Stakes, which was won by Fancy Blue. In the Prix de l'Arc de Triomphe at Longchamp in Paris in October, Deirdre was ridden by Jamie Spencer. After a slow start, she finished eighth of eleven runners. In the Bahrain International Trophy at Sakhir, her final race before retirement, Deirdre was ridden for the first time by Hollie Doyle and finished eighth of fourteen runners.

== Racing form ==
Deirdre won eight races and finished in podium nine times out of 33 starts in eight different countries. This data is available based on JBIS, netkeiba, HKJC, Emirates Racing Authority, British Horseracing Authority, Horseracing Ireland, Riyadh Jockey Club, France Galop,, Bahrain Horseracing, and racingpost.

Date	Track	Race	Grade	Distance (Condition)	Entry	HN	Odds (Favored)	Finish	Time	Margins	Jockey	Winner (Runner-up)
2016 – two-year-old season
Jul 2	Chukyo	2yo Newcomer		1,400 m (Firm)	16	14	6.6 (3)	2nd	1:22.0	0.4	Mirco Demuro	Meisho Sobi
Jul 23	Chukyo	2yo Maiden		1,600 m (Firm)	16	4	4.9 (3)	4th	1:35.6	0.3	Mirco Demuro	Loving Answer
Oct 15	Niigata	2yo Maiden		1,400 m (Firm)	14	11	2.3 (1)	1st	1:22.1	–0.3	Shota Kato	(Apt)
Nov 5	Kyoto	Fantasy Stakes	3	1,400 m (Firm)	12	10	6.9 (3)	3rd	1:22.0	0.2	Mirco Demuro	Mi Suerte
Nov 27	Kyoto	Shiragiku Sho	ALW (1W)	1,600 m (Soft)	11	5	2.7 (1)	2nd	1:38.5	0.3	Yasunari Iwata	Gold Cape
Dec 17	Chukyo	Tsuwabuki Sho	ALW (1W)	1,400 m (Firm)	16	9	3.1 (2)	4th	1:22.6	0.1	Shota Kato	Entry Ticket
2017 – three-year-old season
Feb 12	Kyoto	Kobushi Sho	ALW (1W)	1,600 m (Good)	8	7	3.5 (3)	3rd	1:36.4	0.2	Mirco Demuro	My Style
Mar 11	Nakayama	Anemone Stakes	OP	1,600 m (Firm)	16	6	5.4 (3)	2nd	1:34.8	0.1	Andrasch Starke	Rising Reason
Apr 9	Hanshin	Oka Sho	1	1,600 m (Good)	17	17	207.2 (14)	6th	1:34.9	0.4	Yasunari Iwata	Reine Minoru
May 7	Kyoto	Yaguruma Sho	ALW (1W)	1,800 m (Firm)	9	5	1.5 (1)	1st	1:47.8	–0.3	Yasunari Iwata	(Draw a Card)
May 21	Tokyo	Yushun Himba	1	2,400 m (Firm)	18	7	27.6 (9)	4th	2:24.8	0.7	Yasunari Iwata	Soul Stirring
Aug 13	Sapporo	HTB Sho	ALW (2W)	2,000 m (Good)	10	7	3.5 (2)	1st	2:02.1	0.0	Yasunari Iwata	(La Vie Est Belle)
Sep 9	Nakayama	Shion Stakes	3	2,000 m (Firm)	18	16	2.5 (1)	1st	1:59.8	0.0	Yasunari Iwata	(Caribbean Gold)
Oct 15	Kyoto	Shuka Sho	1	2,000 m (Soft)	18	14	6.3 (3)	1st	2:00.2	–0.2	Christophe Lemaire	(Lys Gracieux)
Nov 12	Kyoto	QEII Cup	1	2,200 m (Firm)	18	11	7.4 (4)	12th	2:15.1	0.8	Yasunari Iwata	Mozu Katchan
2018 – four-year-old season
Feb 11	Kyoto	Kyoto Kinen	2	2,200 m (Soft)	10	3	12.5 (6)	6th	2:17.3	1.0	Yuichi Fukunaga	Clincher
Mar 31	Meydan	Dubai Turf	1	1,800 m (Firm)	15	13	16.6 (7)	3rd	1:46.6	0.6	Christophe Lemaire	Benbatl
Jul 29	Sapporo	Queen Stakes	3	1,800 m (Firm)	11	9	3.2 (1)	1st	1:46.2	–0.5	Christophe Lemaire	(Frontier Queen)
Oct 13	Tokyo	Fuchu Himba Stakes	2	1,800 m (Firm)	11	4	2.3 (1)	1st	1:44.7	0.0	Christophe Lemaire	(Lys Gracieux)
Dec 9	Sha Tin	Hong Kong Cup	1	2,000 m (Firm)	9	9	2.0 (1)	2nd	2:01.9	0.2	Christophe Lemaire	Glorious Forever
2019 – five-year-old season
Feb 24	Nakayama	Nakayama Kinen	2	1,800 m (Firm)	11	5	2.6 (1)	6th	1:46.1	0.6	Christophe Lemaire	Win Bright
Mar 30	Meydan	Dubai Turf	1	1,800 m (Firm)	13	3	12.8 (3)	4th	1:48.0	1.2	Joao Moreira	Almond Eye
Apr 28	Sha Tin	QEII Cup (Hong Kong)	1	2,000 m (Firm)	13	13	6.3 (3)	6th	1:59.5	0.7	Yutaka Take	Win Bright
Jun 19	Ascot	Prince of Wales's Stakes	1	10 f (Good)	8	6	10.9 (5)	6th	2:12.7	2.4	Yutaka Take	Crystal Ocean
Aug 1	Goodwood	Nassau Stakes	1	10 f (Good)	9	1	21.0 (7)	1st	2:02.9	–0.2	Oisin Murphy	(Mehdaayih)
Sep 14	Leopardstown	Irish Champion Stakes	1	10 f (Firm)	8	3	8.4 (3)	4th	2:07.1	0.6	Oisin Murphy	Magical
Oct 19	Ascot	Champion Stakes	1	10 f (Soft)	9	4	11.0 (4)	3rd	2:08.9	0.5	Oisin Murphy	Magical
Dec 8	Sha Tin	Hong Kong Vase	1	2,400 m (Firm)	14	10	6.1 (4)	4th	2:25.4	0.6	Oisin Murphy	Glory Vase
2020 – six-year-old season
Feb 29	King Abdulaziz	M. Yousuf Naghi Motors Cup		2,100 m (Firm)	8	9	1.4 (1)	2nd	2:11.4	0.0	Oisin Murphy	Port Lions
Jul 5	Sandown Park	Eclipse Stakes	1	10 f (Firm)	7	5	14.1 (4)	5th	2:05.5	1.0	Oisin Murphy	Ghaiyyath
Jul 30	Goodwood	Nassau Stakes	1	10 f (Good)	7	1	13/2 (4)	7th	2:06.4	1.4	Oisin Murphy	Fancy Blue
Oct 4	Longchamp	Prix de l'Arc de Triomphe	1	2,400 m (Heavy)	15	9	30.9 (7)	8th	2:40.8	1.5	Jamie Spencer	Sottsass
Nov 20	Sahil	Bahrain International Trophy		2,000 m (Firm)	14	13	–	8th	2:00.8	0.5	Hollie Doyle	Simsir

Legend:
Turf

== Pedigree ==
Pedigree of Deirdre (JPN), bay mare 2014
Sire Harbinger (GB) 2006	Dansili (GB); 1996	Danehill (USA)	Danzig
Sire Harbinger (GB) 2006	Dansili (GB); 1996	Danehill (USA)	Razyana
Sire Harbinger (GB) 2006	Dansili (GB); 1996	Hasili (IRE)	Kahyasi
Sire Harbinger (GB) 2006	Dansili (GB); 1996	Hasili (IRE)	Kerali (GB)
Sire Harbinger (GB) 2006	Penang Pearl (FR); 1996	Bering (GB)	Arctic Tern (USA)
Sire Harbinger (GB) 2006	Penang Pearl (FR); 1996	Bering (GB)	Beaune (FR)
Sire Harbinger (GB) 2006	Penang Pearl (FR); 1996	Guapa (GB)	Shareef Dancer (USA)
Sire Harbinger (GB) 2006	Penang Pearl (FR); 1996	Guapa (GB)	Sauceboat
Dam Reizend (JPN) 2007	Special Week (JPN); 1995	Sunday Silence (USA)	Halo
Dam Reizend (JPN) 2007	Special Week (JPN); 1995	Sunday Silence (USA)	Wishing Well
Dam Reizend (JPN) 2007	Special Week (JPN); 1995	Campaign Girl	Maruzensky
Dam Reizend (JPN) 2007	Special Week (JPN); 1995	Campaign Girl	Lady Shiraoki
Dam Reizend (JPN) 2007	Soninke (GB); 1999	Machiavellian(USA)	Mr. Prospector
Dam Reizend (JPN) 2007	Soninke (GB); 1999	Machiavellian(USA)	Coup de Folie
Dam Reizend (JPN) 2007	Soninke (GB); 1999	Sonic Lady (USA)	Nureyev
Dam Reizend (JPN) 2007	Soninke (GB); 1999	Sonic Lady (USA)	Stumped (Family B3)
