= Lys Gracieux =

Japanese Thoroughbred racehorse

Lys Gracieux リスグラシュー
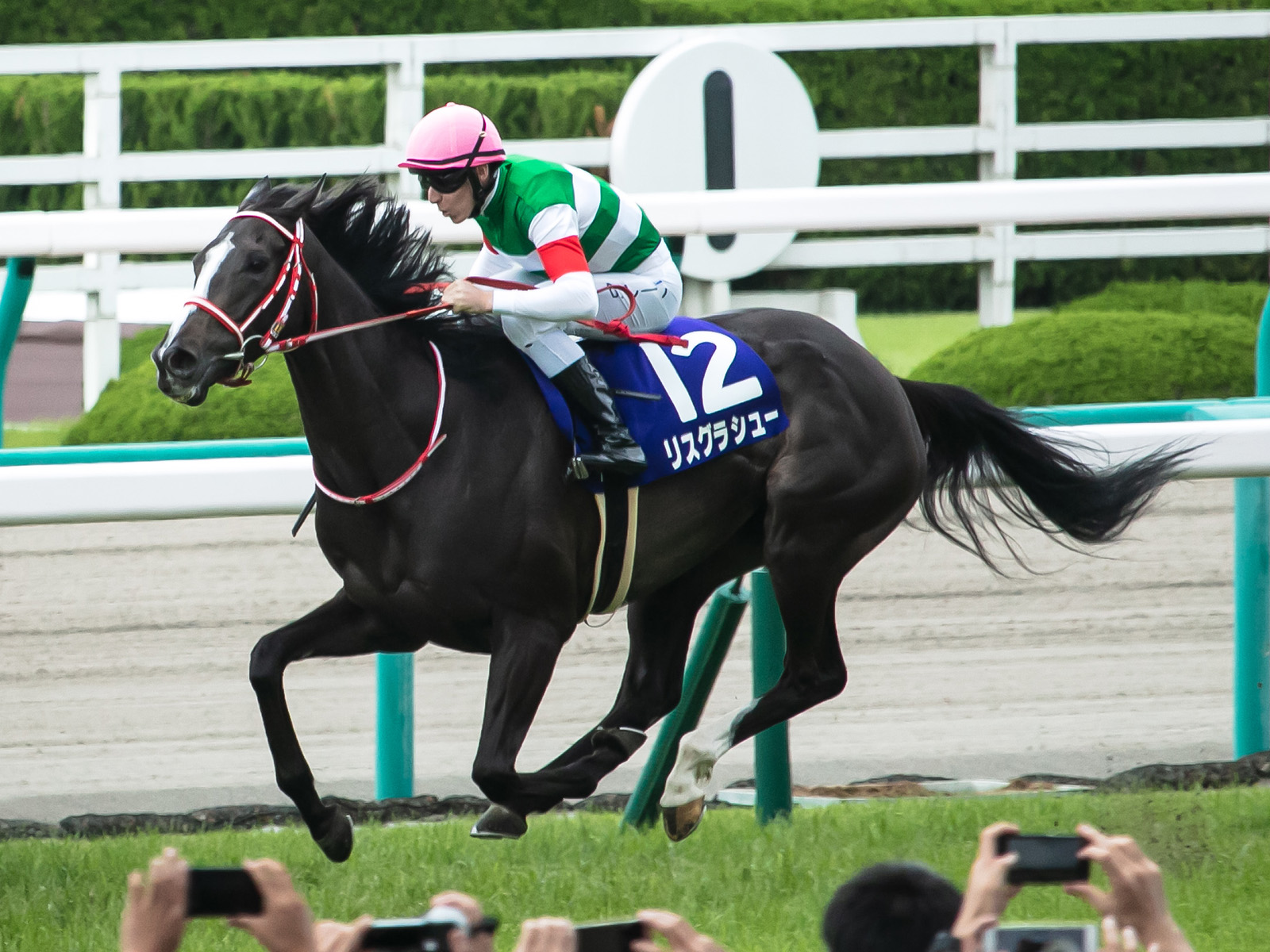
- Lys Gracieux winning the 2019 Takarazuka Kinen.
- Breed: Thoroughbred
- Sire: Heart's Cry
- Grandsire: Sunday Silence
- Dam: Liliside
- Damsire: American Post
- Sex: Mare
- Foaled: January 18, 2014 (age 12)
- Country: Japan
- Colour: Bay or Brown
- Breeder: Northern Farm
- Owner: U Carrot Farm
- Racing colours
- Trainer: Yoshito Yahagi
- Jockey: Yutaka Take; Joao Moreira; Damian Lane
- Record: 22: 7-8-4
- Earnings: ¥1,217,201,000 ($11,023,327)

Major wins
- Artemis Stakes (2016); Tokyo Shimbun Hai (2018); Queen Elizabeth II Cup (2018); Takarazuka Kinen (2019); W. S. Cox Plate (2019); Arima Kinen (2019)

Awards
- JRA Award for Best Older Filly or Mare (2018, 2019); Japanese Horse of the Year (2019)

Honours
- Top-rated Japanese horse (2019); Timeform rating: 128
- Last updated on 2 March 2026

Lys Gracieux (Japanese: リスグラシュー, Hepburn: Risu Gurashū; foaled 18 January 2014) is a retired champion Japanese Thoroughbred racehorse. As a two-year-old in 2016, she showed top-class form, winning two of her four starts (including the Artemis Stakes) and finished second in the Hanshin Juvenile Fillies. In the following year she failed to win but was placed in several major races including the Oka Sho and the Shuka Sho. As a four-year-old she won the Tokyo Shimbun Hai and the Queen Elizabeth II Cup as well as running second in the Victoria Mile and the Hong Kong Vase and was awarded the JRA Award for Best Older Filly or Mare. In 2019, as a five-year-old, she had by far her most successful season, winning three G1 races in a row; the Takarazuka Kinen in June, the Cox Plate in Australia in October, and concluded her racing career with a five-length win in the Arima Kinen in December. She was awarded the 2019 Japanese Horse of the Year and was again awarded Best Older Filly or Mare. Lys Gracieux is one of the three highest earning racehorses in the world among the racehorses born in 2014, along with Thunder Snow and Enable.

== Background ==
Lys Gracieux is a dark bay or brown mare with a white blaze and a white sock on her left hind leg bred in Japan by Northern Farm. During her racing career she was trained by Yoshito Yahagi and raced in the green, white and red colours of the Northern Farm affiliate U Carrot Farm.

She was from the seventh crop of foals sired by Heart's Cry, a horse whose wins included the Arima Kinen and the Dubai Sheema Classic. His other foals have included Admire Rakti, Just A Way and Suave Richard. Lys Gracieux's dam, Liliside showed high-class form on the track in France, winning five of her eleven starts including four Listed races. She was descended from the French broodmare Doublure whose other descendants have included Greek Money, Shirley Heights, Pentire and Divine Proportions.

== Racing career ==
=== 2016: two-year-old season ===
Lys Gracieux began her racing career by finishing second to the colt Root Directory in a contest for previously unraced juveniles over 1600 metres at Niigata Racecourse on 27 August. Two weeks later at Hanshin Racecourse she recorded her first success when she won a maiden race over 1800 metres in a record time of 1:46.2. On 29 October she was stepped up in class for the Grade 3 Artemis Stakes over 1600 metres at Tokyo Racecourse and started the 7/5 favourite against seventeen opponents. Ridden by the veteran Yutaka Take she won by half a length from Flawless Magic. She was then moved up to the highest level for the Grade 1 Hanshin Juvenile Fillies on 11 December. After racing towards the rear of the eighteen-runner field she produced a strong late charge but was unable to reel in the favourite Soul Stirring and finished second, beaten by one and a quarter lengths by the winner.

In the official Japanese ratings for 2016, Lys Gracieux was rated the second-best two-year-old filly, three pounds behind Soul Stirring.

=== 2017: three-year-old season ===
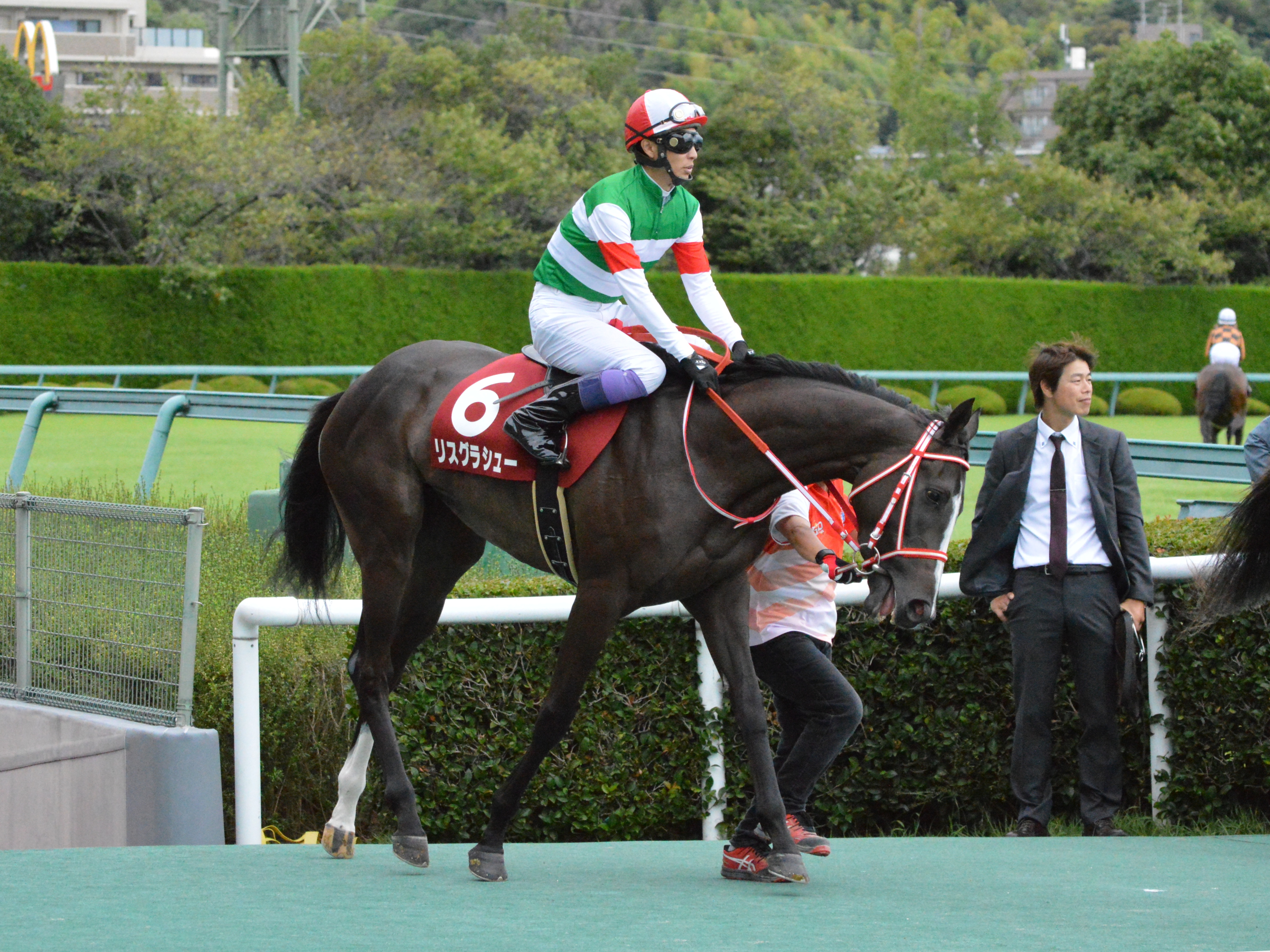
Lys Gracieux in September 2017

On her first appearance as a three-year-old Lys Gracieux ran third behind Soul Stirring and Miss Panthere in the Tulip Sho over 1600 metres at Hanshin on 4 March. In the Grade 1 Oka Sho over the same course and distance five weeks later she produced a sustained challenge in the straight and finished second, beaten half a length by the 40/1 outsider Reine Minoru with Soul Stirring in third place. When moved up in trip for the Yushun Himba at Tokyo on 21 May she came from well off the pace to come home fifth of the eighteen runners behind Soul Stirring.

After a break of almost four months Lys Gracieux returned to the track in September and finished third to Rabbit Run in the Grade 2 Rose Stakes over 1800 metres at Hanshin. In the Grade 1 Shuka Sho a month later the filly produced her customary late charge, caught the leader Mozu Katchan 50 metres from the finish but was overtaken by the fast-finishing Deirdre in the final strides. On her final run of the year Lys Gracieux came home eighth behind Mozu Katchan in the Queen Elizabeth II Cup at Kyoto Racecourse on 12 November.

=== 2018: four-year-old season ===
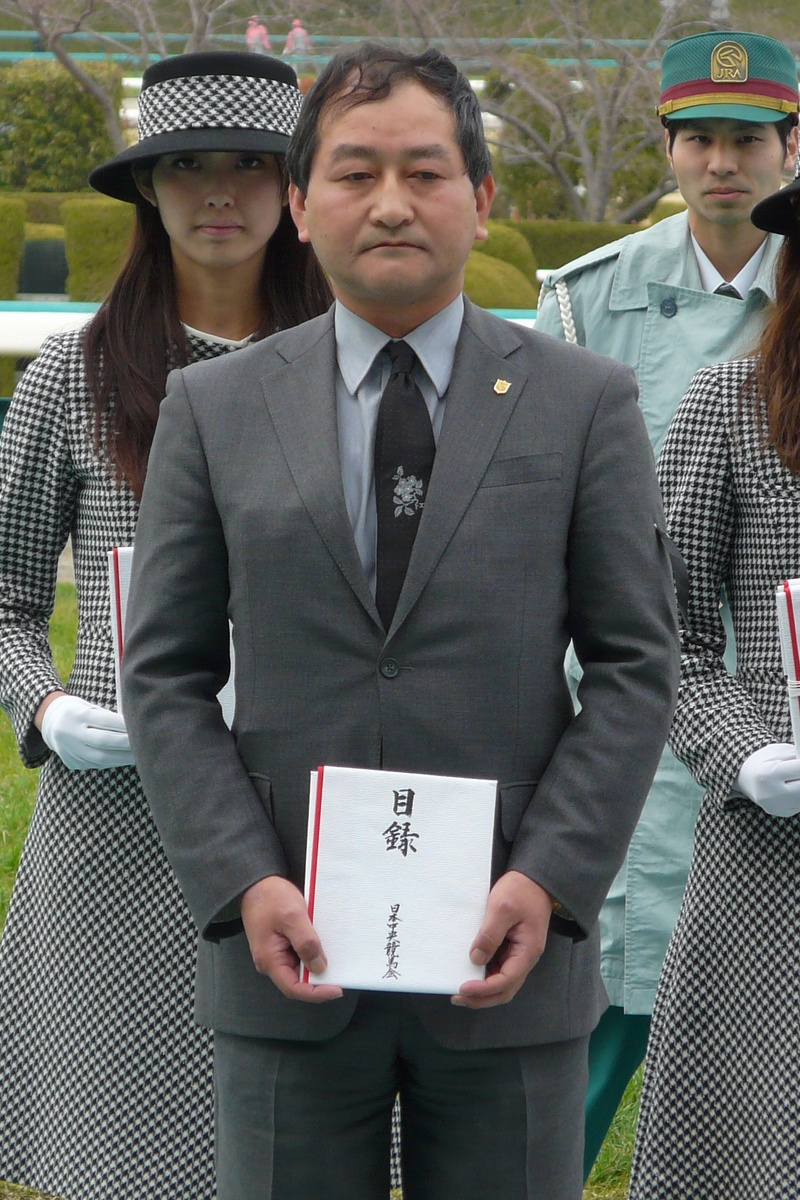
Lys Gracieux's trainer Yoshito Yahagi

Lys Gracieux began her third campaign in the Grade 3 Tokyo Shimbun Hai over 1600 metres on 4 February in which she started the 4.5/1 third choice in the betting behind Daiwa Cagney and Greater London. Ridden by Take she recorded her first win in sixteen months as she won by a length from the four-year-old colt Satono Ares (Asahi Hai Futurity Stakes). In April she started favourite for the Grade 2 Hanshin Himba Stakes but in a closely contested finish she ran third place, beaten a head and a neck by Miss Panthere and Red Avancer. In the Grade 1 Victoria Mile at Tokyo on 13 May the filly went off the 3.3/1 favourite but despite making rapid progress in the straight she failed by a nose to catch the outsider Jour Polaire. In the Yasuda Kinen over the same course and distance on 3 June she made little impact and came home eighth of the sixteen runners behind Mozu Ascot, beaten five and a half lengths by the winner.

On her return from a five-month break Lys Gracieux finished second by a neck to Deirdre in the Fuchu Himba Stakes over 1800 metres at Tokyo on 13 October. Four weeks after her defeat in Tokyo the filly was partnered by João Moreira when she made her second attempt to win the Queen Elizabeth II Cup and started the 2.7/1 third choice in the betting behind Mozu Katchan and Normcore (Shion Stakes) while the other fourteen entrants included Cantabile (Rose Stakes), Miss Panthere and Admire Lead (2017 Victoria Mile). Lys Gracieux raced in mid-division before switching to the outside in the final turn and produced a sustained run in the straight to run down the front-running Crocosmia and win by a neck. Moreira commented "Today was her day. We were in a good position, two off the fence, and she had plenty left in the tank after angling out at the last turn. Under pressure, she responded very well and I had every confidence from the 300 meter point that we were going to win. She's a real champion."

Lys Gracieux ended her season with a trip to Hong Kong to contest the Hong Kong Vase over 2400 metres at Sha Tin Racecourse on 9 December. With Moreira in the saddle she raced towards the rear of the field before launching a strong run on the outside in the straight. She gained the advantage in the last 200 metres but was overtaken in the final strides and beaten a neck by the locally trained Exultant.

In January 2019 Lys Gracieux was named Best Older Filly or Mare at the JRA Awards for 2018 taking 265 of the 276 votes.

=== 2019: five-year-old season ===
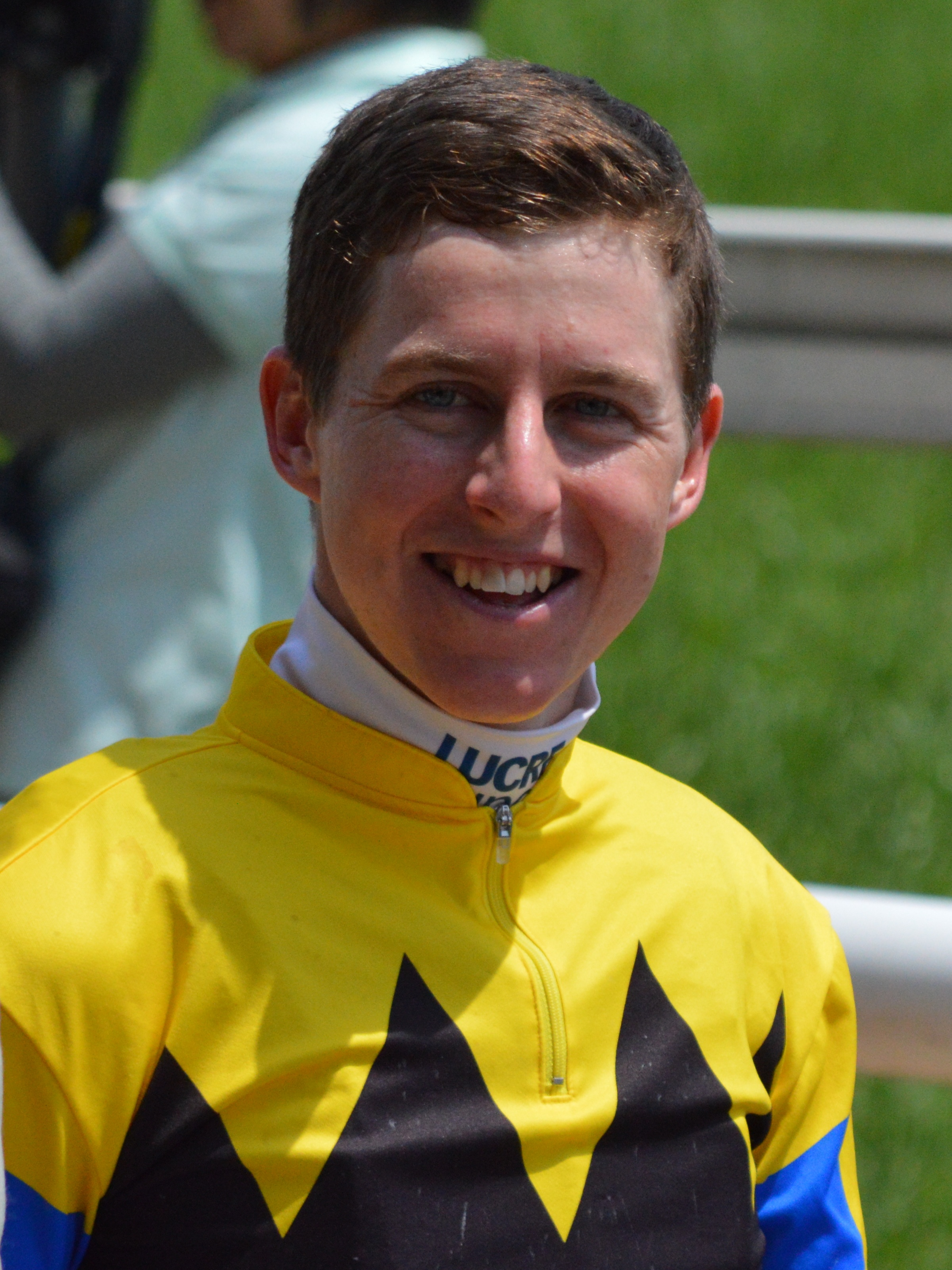
Damian Lane, who rode Lys Gracieux to her three consecutive G1 wins in 2019

On her first run as a five-year-old in the Grade 2 Kinko Sho over 2000 metres at Chukyo Racecourse on 10 March she started at odds of 7.7/1 in a thirteen-runner field and finished second to the four-year-old colt Danon Premium. For her next run the mare was sent to Hong Kong for the second time to contest the Queen Elizabeth II Cup over 2000 metres at Sha Tin. Ridden by Oisin Murphy she was restrained in mid-division before making progress in the straight and came home third behind Win Bright and Exultant, beaten a length by the winner. On her return to Japan she was one of twelve horses to contest the 60th running of the Takarazuka Kinen over 2200 metres at Hanshin on 23 June. She was partnered with Australian jockey Damian Lane and went off the 4.4/1 third choice in the betting behind Kiseki (2017 Kikuka Sho) and Rey de Oro, while the other contenders included Al Ain, Suave Richard and Makahiki. After racing in second place behind the front-running Kiseki, Lys Gracieux challenged the favourite in the straight, gained the advantage 200 metres from the finish and drew away in the closing stages to win by three lengths. Lane commented "She broke well and I thought I might as well use that to my advantage. I was very confident turning in that she had plenty left in the tank and I was worried that there were a lot of good horses chasing and I thought that they would challenge but she was just too strong".

In the autumn of 2019 Lys Gracieux was sent to Australia to contest the Cox Plate over 2,040 metres at Moonee Valley on 26 October. She was given a special exemption to compete as horses who had raced in Hong Kong were banned from entering Australia unless they had spent at least 180 days in a third country in the interim, after the Australian Government raised concerns over China's biosecurity regulations. With Lane again in the saddle she was made the 6/4 favourite against thirteen opponents including Mystic Journey, Castelvecchio (Champagne Stakes (ATC)), Magic Wand (runner-up in the Irish Champion Stakes), Avilius, Danceteria (Bayerisches Zuchtrennen), Verry Elleegant, Cape of Good Hope (Caulfield Stakes) and Kings Will Dream (Turnbull Stakes). Lys Gracieux raced towards the rear before beginning to make rapid progress on the outside approaching the final turn. She overhauled the three-year-old Castelvecchio 70 metres from the finish and kept on well to win by one and a half lengths. After the race Yoshito Yahagi said "I was confident beforehand as she has thrived since she arrived in Australia and was in even better form than when she was in Japan. I've been wanting to win this race for many years, ever since I saw Kingston Town win in 1982... I thought she was not going to make it, but Damian is a top jockey and Lys Gracieux is a very good horse. We will aim her at the Arima Kinen".

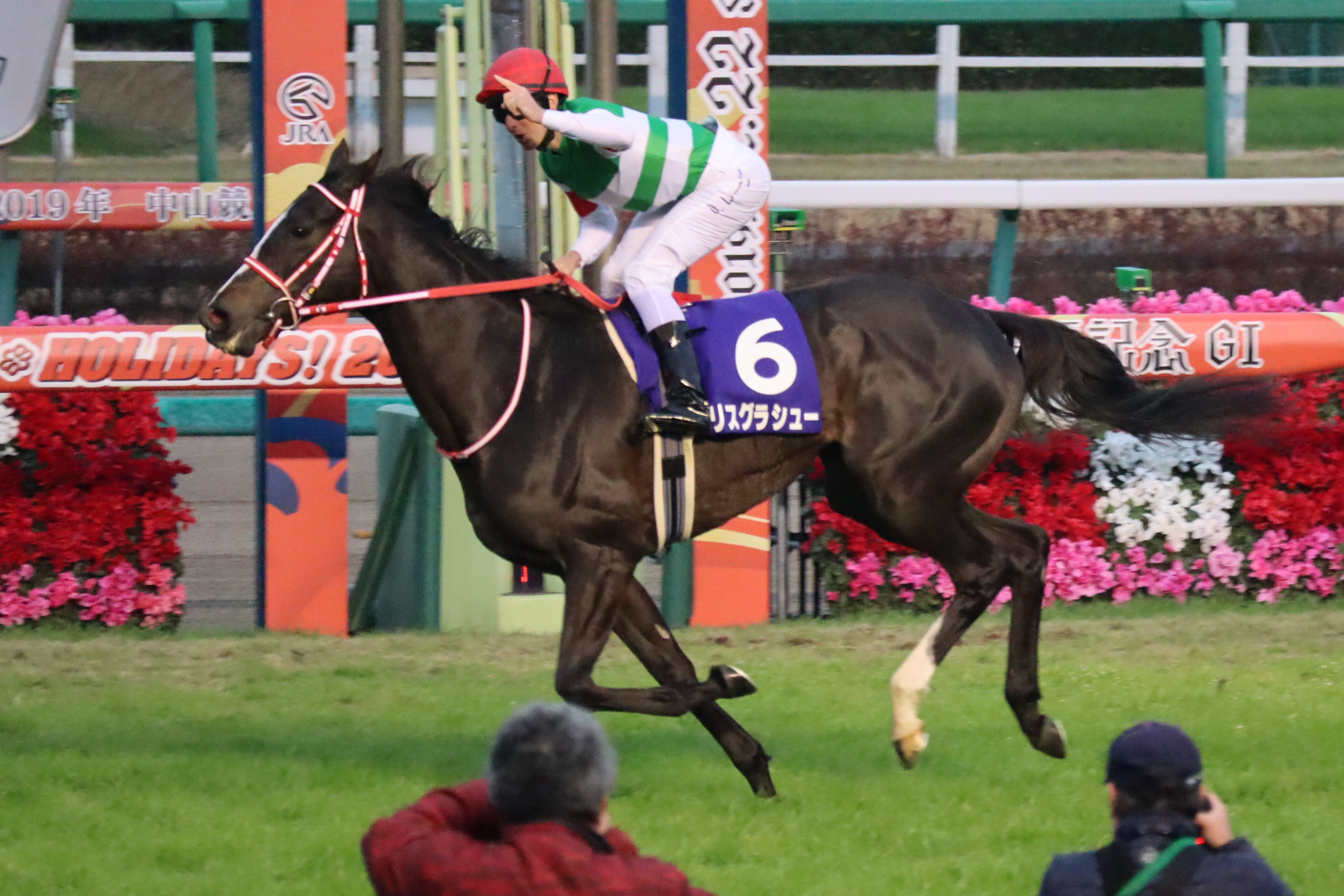
Lys Gracieux wins the Arima Kinen

As Yahagi had suggested, Lys Gracieux ended her season in the Arima Kinen over 2500 metres at Nakayama on 22 December. Ridden by Lane she went off the 5.7/1 second favourite behind Almond Eye in a sixteen-runner field which also included Saturnalia, World Premiere, Suave Richard, Fierement, Kiseki, Rey de Oro, Cheval Grand and Al Ain. Lane settled the mare on the inside rail towards the rear of the field as Aerolithe set a fast pace, and then switched to the outside in the straight. Lys Gracieux accelerated into the lead just inside the last 200 metres and drew right away from her opponents to win easily by five lengths, becoming the first female horse in JRA history to win both Grand Prix races. Lane said "I just had so much confidence in this horse... I just knew she was going to run a big race. It was a really good pace and I found a lovely spot back in the rail... things opened up for me and she just did the rest".

In January 2020 Lys Gracieux was awarded the title of Japanese Horse of the Year, receiving 271 of the 274 votes as well as winning the JRA Award for Best Older Filly or Mare for the second time. In the 2019 World's Best Racehorse Rankings Lys Gracieux was given a rating of 126, making her the fifth best racehorse in the world, the second best racemare in the world, and the best racehorse in Japan. Lys Gracieux is one of the three highest earning racehorses in the world among the racehorses born in 2014, along with Thunder Snow and Enable.

== Racing form ==
Lys Gracieux won seven races and placed on a podium 12 times more out of 22 starts. This data is available in JBIS, netkeiba, HKJC and racingpost.

| Date | Track | Race | Grade | Distance (Condition) | Entry | HN | Odds (Favored) | Finish | Time | Margins | Jockey | Winner (Runner-up) |
|---|---|---|---|---|---|---|---|---|---|---|---|---|
2016 – two-year-old season
| Aug 27 | Niigata | 2yo Newcomer | | 1,600 m (Firm) | 18 | 13 | 3.4 (1) | 2nd | 1:37.0 | 0.0 | Yuta Nakatani | Root Directory |
| Sep 10 | Hanshin | 2yo Maiden | | 1,800 m (Firm) | 18 | 5 | 4.4 (2) | 1st | R1:46.2 | –0.7 | Yuta Nakatani | (Gun Salute) |
| Oct 29 | Tokyo | Artemis Stakes | 3 | 1,600 m (Firm) | 18 | 16 | 2.4 (1) | 1st | 1:35.5 | –0.1 | Yutaka Take | (Flawless Magic) |
| Dec 11 | Hanshin | Hanshin Juvenile Fillies | 1 | 1,600 m (Firm) | 18 | 18 | 3.0 (2) | 2nd | 1:34.2 | 0.2 | Keita Tosaki | Soul Stirring |
2017 – three-year-old season
| Mar 4 | Hanshin | Tulip Sho | 3 | 1,600 m (Firm) | 12 | 3 | 2.7 (2) | 3rd | 1:33.6 | 0.4 | Yutaka Take | Soul Stirring |
| Apr 9 | Hanshin | Oka Sho | 1 | 1,600 m (Good) | 17 | 6 | 14.5 (3) | 2nd | 1:34.6 | 0.1 | Yutaka Take | Reine Minoru |
| May 21 | Tokyo | Yushun Himba | 1 | 2,400 m (Firm) | 18 | 14 | 5.9 (3) | 5th | 2:24.9 | 0.8 | Yutaka Take | Soul Stirring |
| Sep 17 | Hanshin | Rose Stakes | 2 | 1,800 m (Firm) | 18 | 6 | 6.3 (3) | 3rd | 1:45.8 | 0.3 | Yutaka Take | Rabbit Run |
| Oct 15 | Kyoto | Shuka Sho | 1 | 2,000 m (Soft) | 18 | 7 | 7.0 (4) | 2nd | 2:00.4 | 0.2 | Yutaka Take | Deirdre |
| Nov 12 | Kyoto | QEII Cup | 1 | 2,200 m (Firm) | 18 | 6 | 15.0 (7) | 8th | 2:14.7 | 0.4 | Yuichi Fukunaga | Mozu Katchan |
2018 – four-year-old season
| Feb 4 | Tokyo | Tokyo Shimbun Hai | 3 | 1,600 m (Firm) | 16 | 8 | 5.5 (3) | 1st | 1:34.1 | –0.2 | Yutaka Take | (Satono Ares) |
| Apr 7 | Hanshin | Hanshin Himba Stakes | 2 | 1,600 m (Firm) | 13 | 3 | 2.4 (1) | 3rd | 1:34.8 | 0.0 | Yutaka Take | Miss Panthere |
| May 13 | Tokyo | Victoria Mile | 1 | 1,600 m (Good) | 18 | 16 | 4.3 (1) | 2nd | 1:32.3 | 0.0 | Yutaka Take | Jour Polaire |
| Jun 3 | Tokyo | Yasuda Kinen | 1 | 1,600 m (Firm) | 16 | 14 | 11.0 (6) | 8th | 1:32.1 | 0.8 | Yutaka Take | Mozu Ascot |
| Oct 13 | Tokyo | Ireland Trophy | 2 | 1,800 m (Firm) | 11 | 10 | 3.0 (2) | 2nd | 1:44.7 | 0.0 | Mirco Demuro | Deirdre |
| Nov 11 | Kyoto | QEII Cup | 1 | 2,200 m (Firm) | 17 | 12 | 4.2 (3) | 1st | 2:13.1 | 0.0 | Joao Moreira | (Crocosmia) |
| Dec 9 | Sha Tin | Hong Kong Vase | 1 | 2,400 m (Firm) | 14 | 10 | 4.5 (2) | 2nd | 2:26.6 | 0.0 | Joao Moreira | Exultant |
2019 – five-year-old season
| Mar 10 | Chukyo | Kinko Sho | 2 | 2,000 m (Good) | 13 | 11 | 8.7 (5) | 2nd | 2:00.3 | 0.2 | Andrasch Starke | Danon Premium |
| Apr 28 | Sha Tin | QEII Cup (Hong Kong) | 1 | 2,000 m (Firm) | 13 | 12 | 4.1 (2) | 3rd | 1:59.0 | 0.2 | Oisin Murphy | Win Bright |
| Jun 23 | Hanshin | Takarazuka Kinen | 1 | 2,200 m (Firm) | 12 | 12 | 5.6 (3) | 1st | 2:10.8 | –0.5 | Damian Lane | (Kiseki) |
| Oct 26 | Mooney Valley | W S Cox Plate | 1 | 2,040 m (Good) | 18 | 9 | 1.7 (1) | 1st | 2:04.2 | –0.3 | Damian Lane | (Castelvecchio) |
| Dec 22 | Nakayama | Arima Kinen | 1 | 2,500 m (Firm) | 16 | 6 | 6.7 (2) | 1st | 2:30.5 | –0.8 | Damian Lane | (Saturnalia) |

Legend:
Turf

- R indicated that it was a record time finish

== Breeding career ==
c = colt, f = filly

| No. | Name | Foaled | Sex | Color | Sire | Wins | Races | Remarks |
|---|---|---|---|---|---|---|---|---|
| 1st | Schwertlilie | 2021 | c | Bay | Maurice | 0 | 6 | Deceased |
| 2nd | (Lys Gracieux 2022) | 2022 | f | Bay | Rey de Oro | | | |
| 3rd | Gigliato | 2023 | f | Brown | Epiphaneia | 0 | 6 | Retired |
| 4th | Lys Gloire | 2024 | f | Dark Bay | Saturnalia | 1 | 2 | Active |
| 5th | (Lys Gracieux 2025) | 2025 | f | Brown | Equinox | | | |
| | (not foaled) | 2026 | | | Kitasan Black | | | |

== Pedigree ==
Pedigree of Lys Gracieux (JPN), bay or brown mare, 2014
| Sire Heart's Cry (JPN) 2001 | Sunday Silence (USA); 1986 | Halo | Hail to Reason |
| Sire Heart's Cry (JPN) 2001 | Sunday Silence (USA); 1986 | Halo | Cosmah |
| Sire Heart's Cry (JPN) 2001 | Sunday Silence (USA); 1986 | Wishing Well | Understanding |
| Sire Heart's Cry (JPN) 2001 | Sunday Silence (USA); 1986 | Wishing Well | Mountain Flower |
| Sire Heart's Cry (JPN) 2001 | Irish Dance (JPN); 1990 | Tony Bin (IRE) | Kampala (GB) |
| Sire Heart's Cry (JPN) 2001 | Irish Dance (JPN); 1990 | Tony Bin (IRE) | Severn Bridge (GB) |
| Sire Heart's Cry (JPN) 2001 | Irish Dance (JPN); 1990 | Buper Dance (USA) | Lyphard |
| Sire Heart's Cry (JPN) 2001 | Irish Dance (JPN); 1990 | Buper Dance (USA) | My Bupers |
| Dam Liliside (FR) 2007 | American Post (GB); 2001 | Bering | Arctic Tern (USA) |
| Dam Liliside (FR) 2007 | American Post (GB); 2001 | Bering | Beaune (FR) |
| Dam Liliside (FR) 2007 | American Post (GB); 2001 | Wells Fargo | Sadler's Wells (USA) |
| Dam Liliside (FR) 2007 | American Post (GB); 2001 | Wells Fargo | Cruising Height |
| Dam Liliside (FR) 2007 | Millers Lily (FR); 1988 | Millers Mate (GB) | Mill Reef (USA) |
| Dam Liliside (FR) 2007 | Millers Lily (FR); 1988 | Millers Mate (GB) | Primatie (FR) |
| Dam Liliside (FR) 2007 | Millers Lily (FR); 1988 | Lymara | Lyphard (USA) |
| Dam Liliside (FR) 2007 | Millers Lily (FR); 1988 | Lymara | Maradadi (Family: 1-l) |

- Lys Gracieux was inbred 4 × 4 to Lyphard, meaning that this stallion appears twice in the fourth generation of her pedigree.
