= Reine Minoru =

Japanese Thoroughbred racehorse

Reine Minoru レーヌミノル
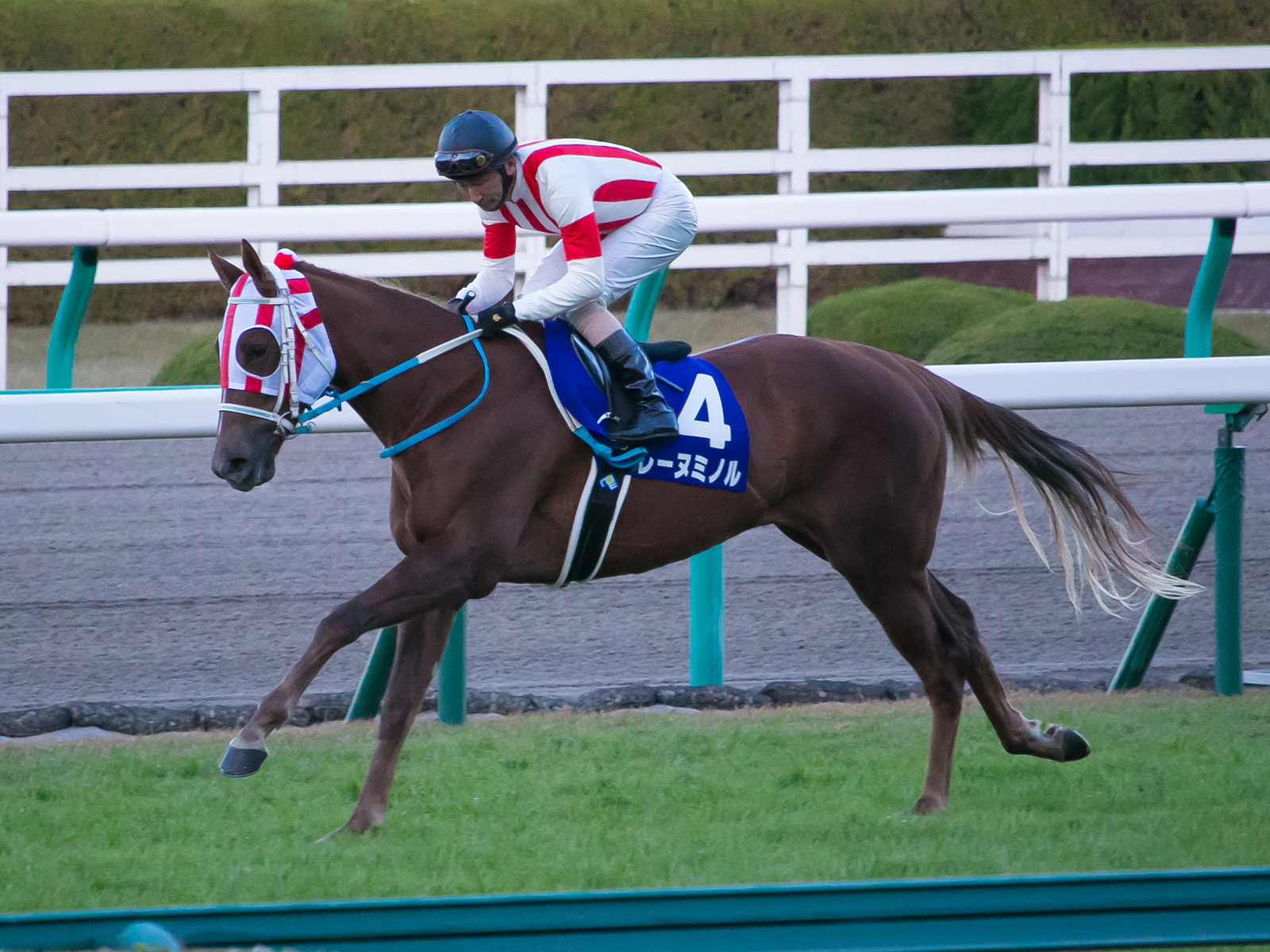
- Reine Minoru in December 2016
- Breed: Thoroughbred
- Sire: Daiwa Major
- Grandsire: Sunday Silence
- Dam: Daiwa Angel
- Damsire: Taiki Shuttle
- Sex: Mare
- Foaled: 24 April 2014
- Country: Japan
- Colour: Chestnut
- Breeder: Fujiwara Farm
- Owner: Minoru Yoshioka
- Racing colours
- Trainer: Masaru Honda
- Jockey: Suguru Hamanaka
- Record: 20: 3-2-1
- Earnings: ¥230,091,000

Major wins
- Kokura Nisai Stakes (2016); Japanese Classic Tiara Race wins: Oka Sho (2017)

Reine Minoru (Japanese: レーヌミノル, Hepburn: Rēnu Minoru; foaled 24 April 2014) is a Japanese Thoroughbred racehorse and broodmare. As a two-year-old in 2016 she showed great promise by winning her first two races including the Kokura Nisai Stakes and went on to be placed in both the Keio Hai Nisai Stakes and the Hanshin Juvenile Fillies. In the following spring she ran fourth in the Queen Cup and second in the Fillies' Revue before recording an upset victory over a strong field in the Oka Sho. She failed to win in thirteen subsequent races, running her last race in February 2019.

== Background ==
Reine Minoru is a chestnut mare with a white stripe bred in Japan by Fujiwara Farm. During her racing career she was trained by Masaru Honda and raced in the red and white colours of Minoru Yoshioka. She usually raced in a red and white hood.

She was from the sixth crop of foals sired by Daiwa Major, an outstanding miler whose wins included the Tenno Sho, Mile Championship and Yasuda Kinen. As a breeding stallion he has also sired Major Emblem, Curren Black Hill (NHK Mile Cup), Resistencia and Admire Mars. Reine Minoru's dam Daiwa Angel showed no racing ability, failing to win in four starts. She was a female-line descendant of the American broodmare Lima (foaled 1937), a half-sister to Bostonian.

== Racing career ==
=== 2016: two-year-old season ===
Reine Minoru made a successful racecourse debut when she won a maiden race over 1200 metres at Kokura Racecourse on 7 August. Four weeks later over the same course and distance the filly was stepped up in class for the Grade 3 Kokura Nisai Stakes and started the 2.9/1 favourite in a fifteen-runner field. Ridden by Suguru Hamanaka she won by six lengths from Daiichi Terminal.

After a two-month break the filly returned at Tokyo Racecourse when she was moved up in class and distance for the Grade 2 Keio Hai Nisai Stakes over 1400 metres in which she started favourite but was beaten half a length into second place by the colt Monde Can Know after being overtaken in the last 100 metres. Reine Minoru ended her season in the Grade 1 Hanshin Juvenile Fillies over 1600 metres at Hanshin Racecourse on 11 December when started at odds of 6.9/1 and came home third behind Soul Stirring and Lys Gracieux only losing second place in the last 50 metres.

In the official Japanese ratings for 2016, Reine Minoru was rated the fifth-best two-year-old filly, six pounds behind Soul Stirring.

=== 2017: three-year-old season ===
On her first run of 2017 Reine Minoru started at odds of 3.6/1 for the Grade 3 Queen Cup at Tokyo on 11 February and came home fourth of the sixteen runners behind Admire Mayabi, Aerolithe and Flawless Magic. On 12 March she was made odds-on favourite for the Grade 2 Fillies' Revue at Hanshin but was beat a neck into second place by Karakurenai. On that race, Hamanaka was handed an 8-day suspension as a result of the horse blocking Jeune Ecole and other horses during the race.

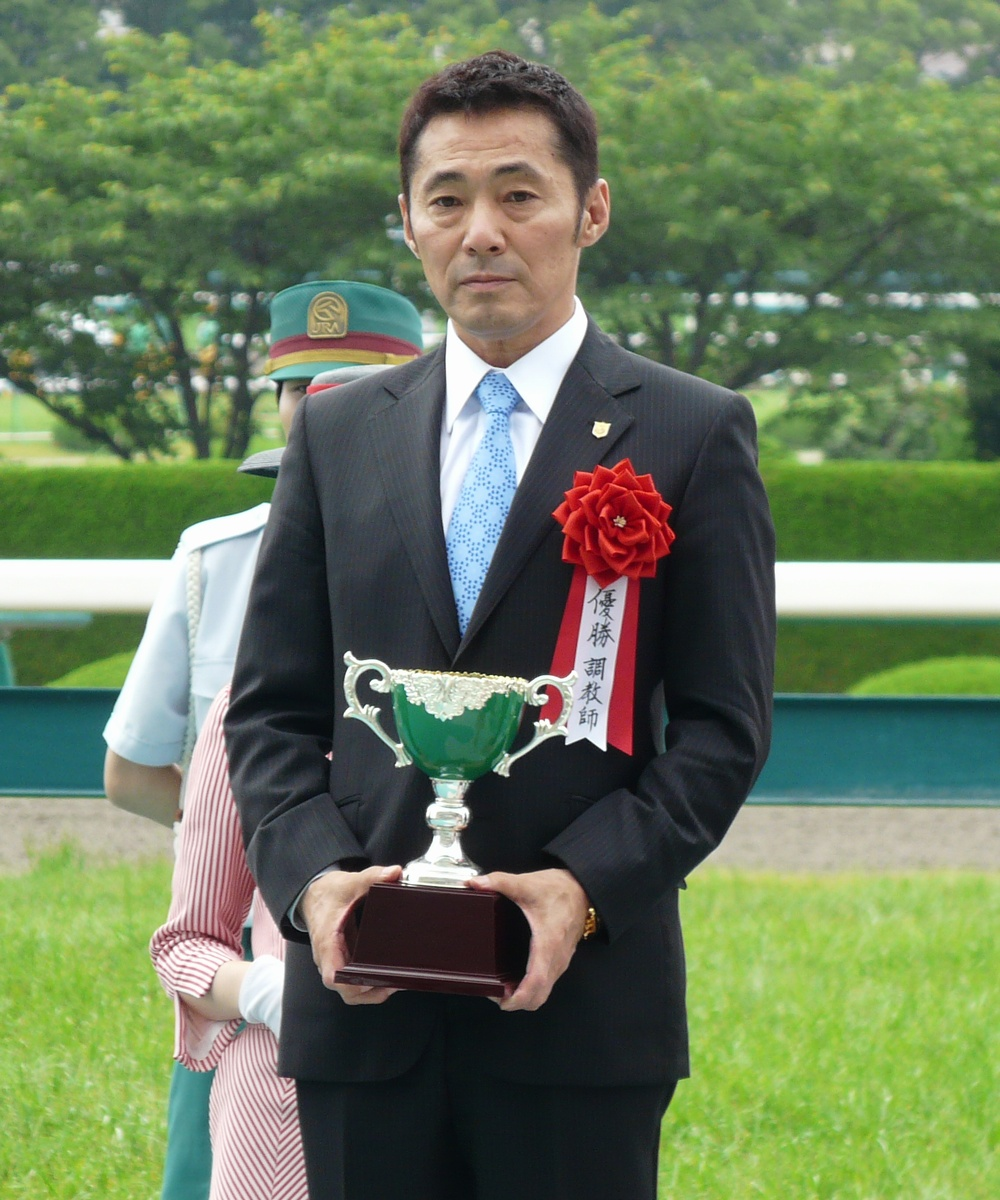
Reine Minoru's trainer Masaru Honda

In the 77th edition of the Oka Sho over 1600 metres at Hanshin on 9 April Reine Mionoru was partnered by Kenichi Ikezoe and started a 39.8/1 outsider in a seventeen-runner field. Soul Stirring started favourite while the other contenders included Admire Mayabi, Lys Gracieux, Mi Suerte (Fantasy Stakes), Aerolithe, Karakurenai, Rising Reason (Fairy Stakes), Jeune Ecole (Nisai Stakes) and Deirdre. Reine Minoru started fast before settling in fourth as the outsider Kawakita Enka set the pace and opened up a long lead. She made a forward move entering the straight, took the lead just inside the last 200 metres and held off several late challengers in the closing stages to win by half a length and a neck from Lys Gracieux and Soul Stirring. After the race Ikezoe said "I felt that she was a talented filly and had a good chance to win the Oka Sho when I rode her for the first time in training. I was more confident today as she felt really good in the post parade, and once she broke smoothly out of the gate, I just concentrated on keeping her stride in good rhythm. I was careful not to let her go too early in the straight and once we hit the front, it felt like forever up to the finish line as the horses came chasing behind us, but she really held on well". Her assistant trainer Hitoshi Nakai later commented "The ground was pretty shifty and she couldn't get traction in a number of places. It was a tough race but she ran solidly until the end... She was in tiptop shape and was the most tense she's ever been. She was tired after that...".

Reine Minoru was stepped up in distance for the Yushun Himba over 2400 metres at Tokyo on 21 May and started the 9.4/1 fourth choice in the betting but after reaching fifth place on the final turn she faded in the straight and came home thirteenth of the eighteen runners behind Soul Stirring.

After a summer break Reine Minoru returned on 17 September and finished ninth in the Rose Stakes before running unplaced behind Deirdre in the Shuka Sho a month later. Hitoshi Nakai blamed the poor condition of the track for her disappointing performance in the latter race. On 19 November at Kyoto Racecourse she was matched against male opposition in the Mile Championship and produced a much better effort: starting a 46/1 outsider she settled in fifth place before moving up to dispute the lead in the straight and finished a close fourth behind Persian Knight, Air Spinel and Sungrazer. The filly ended her season on 21 December by finishing seventh behind Isla Bonita in the Hanshin Cup.

In the official Japanese ratings for 2017, Reine Minoru was rated the third-best three-year-old filly, behind Soul Stirring and Deirdre.

=== 2018–19: later career ===
Reine Minoru remained in training as a four-year-old in 2018 but failed to win or place in seven races. After finishing sixth in the Ocean Stakes at Nakayama Racecourse she produced her best performance of the season when she finished seventh behind Fine Needle in the Takamatsunomiya Kinen on 25 March beaten only two lengths by the winner. She subsequently ran unplaced in the Victoria Mile, Yasuda Kinen, Swan Stakes, Mile Championship and Hanshin Cup.

In February 2019 Reine Minoru came home eleventh of the seventeen runners behind Dea Ragalo in the Kyoto Himba Stakes and was retired from racing.

== Racing form ==
Reine Minoru won three and placed in podium for another three races out of 20 starts. This data is available in JBIS and netkeiba.

| Date | Track | Race | Grade | Distance (Condition) | Entry | HN | Odds (Favored) | Finish | Time | Margins | Jockey | Winner (Runner-up) |
|---|---|---|---|---|---|---|---|---|---|---|---|---|
2016 – two-year-old season
| Aug 7 | Kokura | 2yo Newcomer | | 1,200 m (Firm) | 10 | 9 | 1.8 (1) | 1st | 1:09.3 | –0.3 | Suguru Hamanaka | (Meisho Luci) |
| Sep 4 | Kokura | Kokura Nisai Stakes | 3 | 1,200 m (Firm) | 15 | 4 | 3.9 (1) | 1st | 1:08.3 | –1.0 | Suguru Hamanaka | (Daiichi Terminal) |
| Nov 5 | Tokyo | Keio Hai Nisai Stakes | 2 | 1,400 m (Firm) | 13 | 8 | 2.0 (1) | 2nd | 1:22.0 | 0.1 | Suguru Hamanaka | Monde Can Know |
| Dec 11 | Hanshin | Hanshin Juvenile Fillies | 1 | 1,600 m (Firm) | 18 | 4 | 6.9 (3) | 3rd | 1:34.5 | 0.5 | Masayoshi Ebina | Soul Stirring |
2017 – three-year-old season
| Feb 11 | Tokyo | Daily Hai Queen Cup | 3 | 1,600 m (Firm) | 16 | 8 | 4.6 (3) | 4th | 1:33.7 | 0.5 | Suguru Hamanaka | Admire Miyabi |
| Mar 12 | Hanshin | Fillies' Revue | 2 | 1,400 m (Firm) | 18 | 15 | 1.8 (1) | 2nd | 1:21.1 | 0.1 | Suguru Hamanaka | Karakurenai |
| Apr 9 | Hanshin | Oka Sho | 1 | 1,600 m (Good) | 17 | 10 | 40.8 (8) | 1st | 1:34.5 | –0.1 | Kenichi Ikezoe | (Lys Gracieux) |
| May 21 | Tokyo | Yushun Himba | 1 | 2,400 m (Firm) | 18 | 13 | 10.4 (4) | 13th | 2:26.2 | 2.1 | Kenichi Ikezoe | Soul Stirring |
| Sep 17 | Hanshin | Rose Stakes | 2 | 1,800 m (Firm) | 18 | 10 | 7.5 (4) | 9th | 1:46.3 | 0.8 | Kenichi Ikezoe | Rabbit Run |
| Oct 15 | Kyoto | Shuka Sho | 1 | 2,000 m (Soft) | 18 | 12 | 30.6 (10) | 14th | 2:02.8 | 2.6 | Kenichi Ikezoe | Deirdre |
| Nov 19 | Kyoto | Mile Championship | 1 | 1,600 m (Good) | 18 | 9 | 46.5 (10) | 4th | 1:34.0 | 0.2 | Ryuji Wada | Persian Knight |
| Dec 23 | Hanshin | Hanshin Cup | 2 | 1,400 m (Firm) | 18 | 5 | 7.1 (4) | 7th | 1:20.1 | 0.6 | Ryuji Wada | Isla Bonita |
2018 – four-year-old season
| Mar 3 | Nakayama | Ocean Stakes | 3 | 1,200 m (Firm) | 16 | 15 | 5.1 (3) | 6th | 1:08.4 | 0.1 | Ryuji Wada | King Heart |
| Mar 25 | Chukyo | Takamatsunomiya Kinen | 1 | 1,200 m (Firm) | 18 | 13 | 19.3 (7) | 7th | 1:08.8 | 0.3 | Ryuji Wada | Fine Needle |
| May 13 | Tokyo | Victoria Mile | 1 | 1,600 m (Good) | 18 | 5 | 22.7 (9) | 10th | 1:33.1 | 0.8 | Ryuji Wada | Jour Polaire |
| Jun 3 | Tokyo | Yasuda Kinen | 1 | 1,600 m (Firm) | 16 | 6 | 146.7 (15) | 12th | 1:32.5 | 1.2 | Ryuji Wada | Mozu Ascot |
| Oct 27 | Kyoto | Swan Stakes | 2 | 1,400 m (Firm) | 11 | 6 | 12.4 (3) | 7th | 1:22.2 | 0.7 | Ryuji Wada | Lord Quest |
| Nov 18 | Kyoto | Mile Championship | 1 | 1,600 m (Firm) | 18 | 12 | 216.7 (15) | 18th | 1:34.6 | 1.3 | Hirofumi Shii | Stelvio |
| Dec 22 | Hanshin | Hanshin Cup | 2 | 1,400 m (Good) | 16 | 12 | 77.4 (14) | 13th | 1:22.9 | 1.8 | Ryuji Wada | Diana Halo |
2019 – five-year-old season
| Feb 16 | Kyoto | Kyoto Himba Stakes | 3 | 1,400 m (Firm) | 17 | 5 | 65.8 (12) | 11th | 1:22.1 | 1.1 | Daisaku Matsuda | Dea Regalo |

Legend:
Turf

== Breeding record ==
Reine Minoru was retired from racing to become a broodmare. She was covered by Leontes shortly after her last race and foaled a filly named Cotton Candy. In addition, Reine Minoru has been covered by Bricks and Mortar, Epiphaneia, and Saturnalia as of 2023.

== Pedigree ==
Pedigree of Reine Minoru (JPN), chestnut mare 2014
| Sire Daiwa Major (JPN) 2001 | Sunday Silence (USA); 1986 | Halo | Hail to Reason |
| Sire Daiwa Major (JPN) 2001 | Sunday Silence (USA); 1986 | Halo | Cosmah |
| Sire Daiwa Major (JPN) 2001 | Sunday Silence (USA); 1986 | Wishing Well | Understanding |
| Sire Daiwa Major (JPN) 2001 | Sunday Silence (USA); 1986 | Wishing Well | Mountain Flower |
| Sire Daiwa Major (JPN) 2001 | Scarlet Bouquet (JPN); 1988 | Northern Taste (CAN) | Northern Dancer |
| Sire Daiwa Major (JPN) 2001 | Scarlet Bouquet (JPN); 1988 | Northern Taste (CAN) | Lady Victoria |
| Sire Daiwa Major (JPN) 2001 | Scarlet Bouquet (JPN); 1988 | Scarlet Ink (USA) | Crimson Satan |
| Sire Daiwa Major (JPN) 2001 | Scarlet Bouquet (JPN); 1988 | Scarlet Ink (USA) | Consentida |
| Dam Daiwa Angel (JPN) 2000 | Taiki Shuttle (USA); 1994 | Devil's Bag | Halo |
| Dam Daiwa Angel (JPN) 2000 | Taiki Shuttle (USA); 1994 | Devil's Bag | Ballade |
| Dam Daiwa Angel (JPN) 2000 | Taiki Shuttle (USA); 1994 | Welsh Muffin (IRE) | Caerleon (USA) |
| Dam Daiwa Angel (JPN) 2000 | Taiki Shuttle (USA); 1994 | Welsh Muffin (IRE) | Muffitys (GB) |
| Dam Daiwa Angel (JPN) 2000 | Princess Ski (JPN); 1985 | Royal Ski (USA) | Raja Baba |
| Dam Daiwa Angel (JPN) 2000 | Princess Ski (JPN); 1985 | Royal Ski (USA) | Coz O'Nijijinsky |
| Dam Daiwa Angel (JPN) 2000 | Princess Ski (JPN); 1985 | Gift Princess | Tesco Boy (GB) |
| Dam Daiwa Angel (JPN) 2000 | Princess Ski (JPN); 1985 | Gift Princess | Yamato Tachibana (Family: 2-c) |

- Reine Minoru was inbred 3 × 4 to Halo, meaning that this stallion appears in both the third and fourth generation of her pedigree.
