= Shion Stakes =

Shion Stakes 紫苑ステークス
- Kelly Fled Ask winning the 2025 Shion Stakes
- Class: Grade 2
- Location: Nakayama Racecourse
- Inaugurated: 2000
- Race type: Thoroughbred Flat racing

Race information
- Distance: 2000 metres
- Surface: Turf
- Track: Right-handed
- Qualification: 3-y-o fillies
- Weight: 55 kg
- Purse: ¥ 112,520,000 (as of 2024): 1st: ¥ 52,000,000; 2nd: ¥ 21,000,000; 3rd: ¥ 13,000,000

The Shion Stakes (Japanese 紫苑ステークス) is a Grade 2 horse race for three-year-old Thoroughbred fillies run in September over a distance of 2000 metres at Nakayama Racecourse.

The race, which serves as a trial race for the Shuka Sho, was first contested in 2000 and had been run at Grade 3 level since 2016. The Shion Stakes was originally run over 1800 metres before the distance was increased to 2000 metres in 2007. The 2002 and 2014 editions were held at Niigata Racecourse. It was promoted to Grade 2 in 2023.

== Winners since 2016 ==
Year	Winner	Jockey	Trainer	Owner	Time
2016	Biche	Keita Tosaki	Yuichi Shikato	Yasushi Kubota	1:59.7
2017	Deirdre	Yasunari Iwata	Mitsuru Hashida	Touji Morita	1:59.8
2018	Normcore	Christophe Lemaire	Kiyoshi Hagiwara	Seiichi Iketani	1:58.0
2019	Passing Through	Keita Tosaki	Yoichi Kuroiwa	Carrot Farm	1:58.3
2020	Maltese Diosa	Hironobu Tanabe	Takahisa Tezuka	Nagako Fujita	2:02.1
2021	Fine Rouge	Yuichi Fukunaga	Takaki Iwato	Genichi Mutsui	1:58.2
2022	Stunning Rose	Ryusei Sakai	Tomokazu Takano	Sunday Racing	1:59.9
2023	Moryana	Norihiro Yokoyama	Yoshinori Muto	Fumio Takahashi	1:58.0
2024	Christmas Parade	Yukito Ishikawa	Shizuya Kato	G1 Racing Co. Ltd.	1:56.6 (Note: Set the current course record)
2025	Kelly Fled Ask	Koji Nishizuka	Hideaki Fujiwara	Toshihiro Hirosaki	1:59.1
2026	Master Soarer	Takuya Ono	Masayoshi Ebina	Insel Racing Co. Ltd.	2:03.5

== Earlier winners ==
- 2000 - Mejiro Marie
- 2001 - Lady Pastel
- 2002 - Osumi Cosmo
- 2003 - Rendo Felice
- 2004 - Ingot
- 2005 - Cosmo Marvelous
- 2006 - Cendrillon
- 2007 - Arco Senora
- 2008 - Moere Katrina
- 2009 - Diana Barows
- 2010 - Dear Arethusa
- 2011 - Calmato
- 2012 - Para La Salud
- 2013 - Sekisho
- 2014 - Reve d'Etoiles
- 2015 - Queens Milagro

== See also ==
- Horse racing in Japan
- List of Japanese flat horse races
