= Pixie Knight =

Japanese Thoroughbred racehorse

Pixie Knight ピクシーナイト
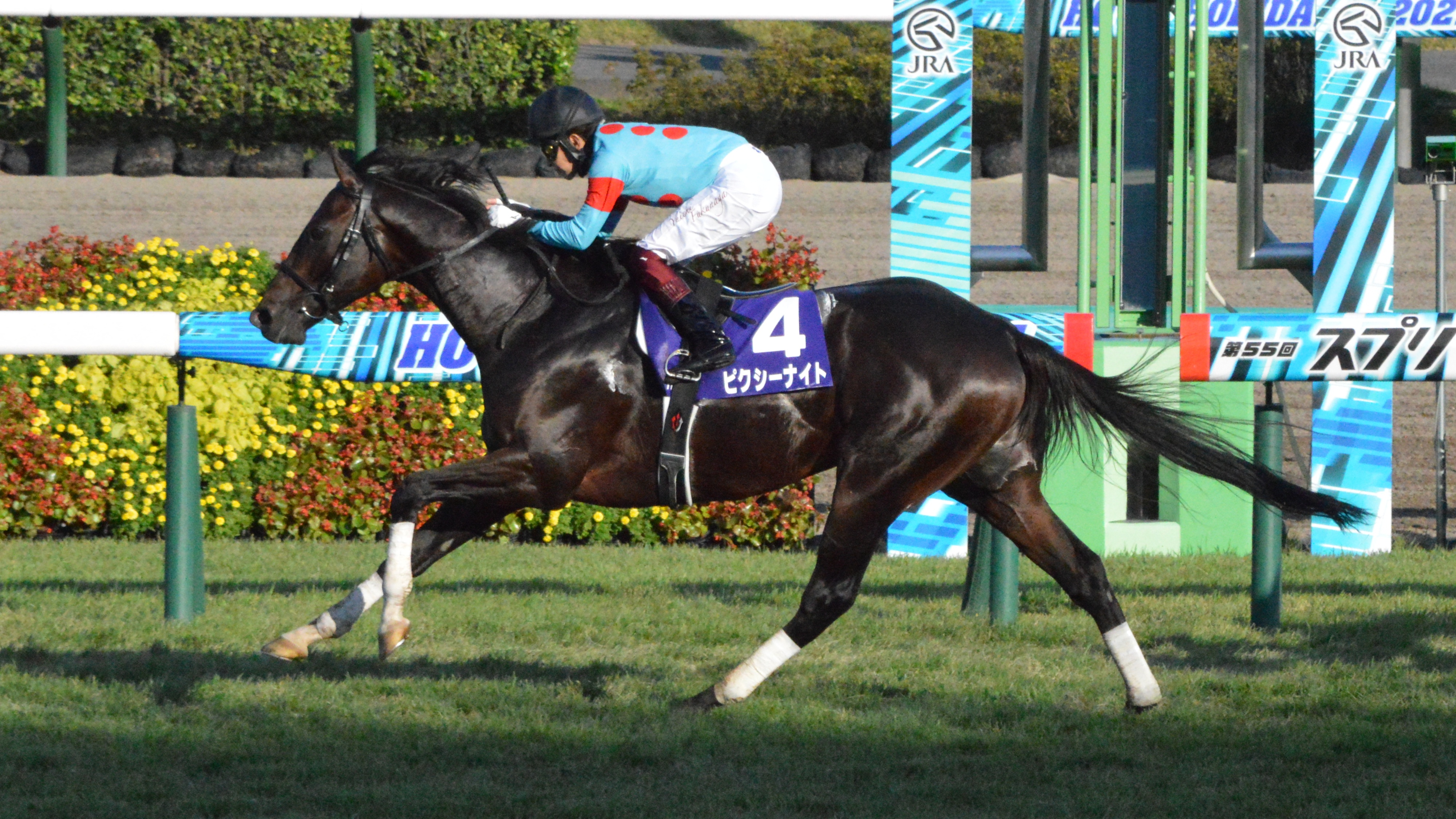
- Pixie Knight winning the Sprinters Stakes (2021)
- Breed: Thoroughbred
- Sire: Maurice
- Grandsire: Screen Hero
- Dam: Pixie Hollow
- Damsire: King Halo
- Sex: Colt
- Foaled: 14 May 2018
- Country: Japan
- Colour: Bay
- Breeder: Northern Farm
- Owner: Silk Racing
- Racing colours
- Trainer: Hidetaka Otonashi
- Jockey: Yuichi Fukunaga
- Record: 14: 3-2-1
- Earnings: ¥227,642,000

Major wins
- Shinzan Kinen (2021); Sprinters Stakes (2021)
- Last updated on December 30, 2023

Pixie Knight (Japanese: ピクシーナイト, Hepburn: Pikushī Naito; foaled 14 May 2018) is a Japanese Thoroughbred racehorse. He showed promise as a two-year-old in 2020 when he won one of his two starts. In the following year he was initially campaigned over 1600 metres but after winning the Shinzan Kinen on his seasonal debut he was well beaten in his next two starts. He was then dropped back in distance to contest sprint races and showed improved form as he was narrowly beaten by older opponents in the CBC Sho and the Centaur Stakes before recording a decisive victory in the Grade 1 Sprinters Stakes.

== Background ==
Pixie Knight is a bay colt with a white blaze bred in Japan by Northern Farm. During his racing career he was trained by Hidetaka Otonashi and raced in the blue and red colours of the Northern Farm affiliate Silk Racing. Pixie Knight is a large Thoroughbred, weighing up to 538 kg during his racing career. He was ridden in all of his early races by Yuichi Fukunaga.

He was from the first crop of foals sired by Maurice, a six-time Grade 1 winner who was named Japanese Horse of the Year for 2015. Pixie Knight's dam Pixie Hollow showed modest racing ability, winning three races from fourteen attempts. She was descended from the American broodmare Some Pomp, making her a distant relative of the Kentucky Derby winner Lucky Debonair.

== Racing career ==
=== 2020: two-year-old season ===
Pixie Knight made his racecourse debut in a contest for previously unraced two-year-olds over 1400 metres on firm ground at Chukyo Racecourse on 26 September. Starting the 0.7/1 favourite in an eleven-runner field he came from fifth place on the final turn to win by half a length from Air Shrub. In the Shumeigiku Sho over the same distance at Hanshin Racecourse in November he started favourite but finished third behind Blue Spirit and Grande Fiore, beaten two and a quarter lengths by the winner.

=== 2021 and onwards ===
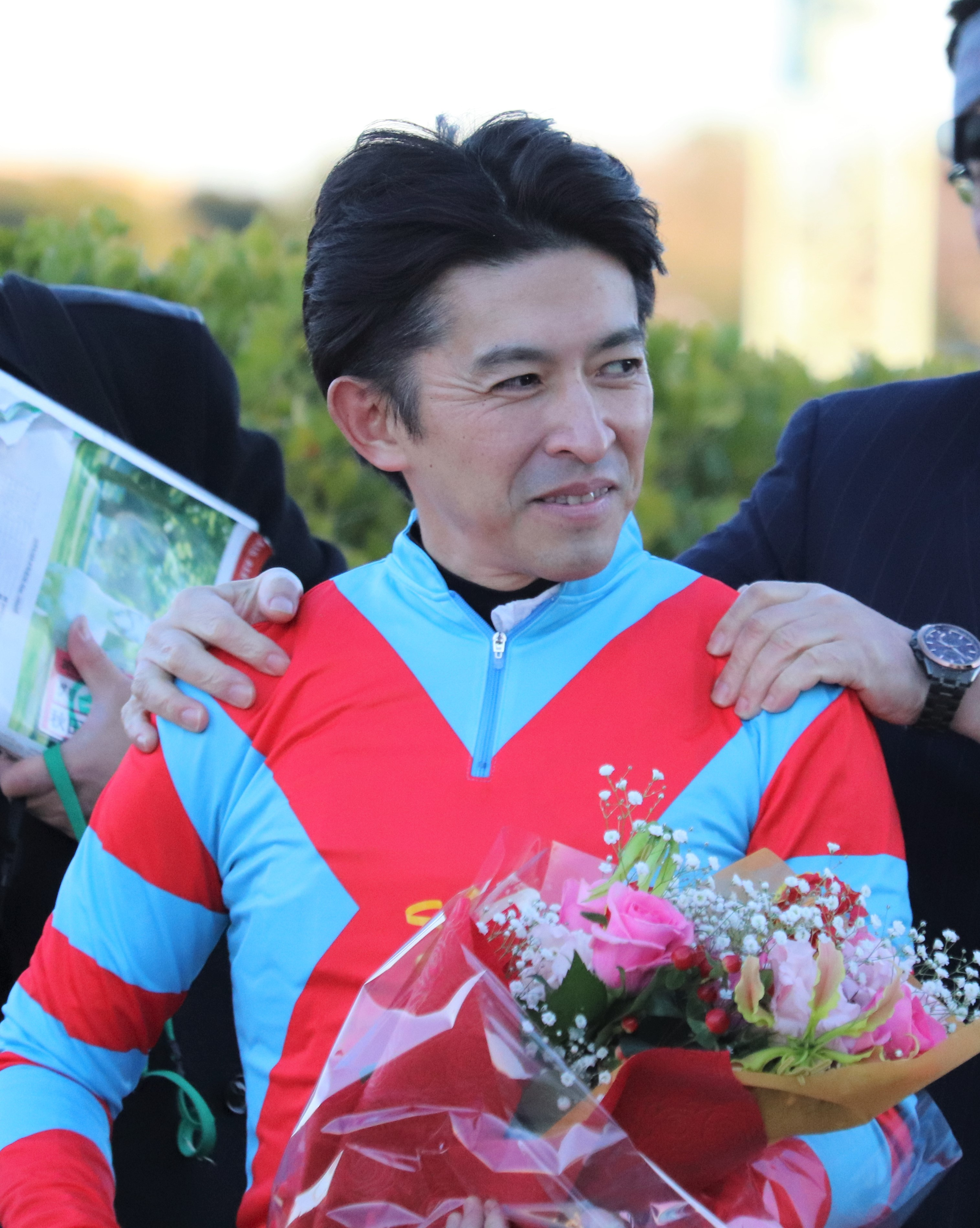
Pixie Knight's former jockey Yuichi Fukunaga

On 19 January 2021 Pixie Knight was stepped up in class to begin his second campaign in the Grade 3 Shinzan Kinen over 1600 metres at Chukyo and started the 12/1 fourth choice in the betting. He took the lead from the start and was never headed, coming home one and a quarter lengths clear of Rooks Nest. After a break of almost three months he returned in the Grade 3 Arlington Cup at Hanshin when he started second favourite but finished fourth behind Ho O Amazon, Rickenbacker and Raymond Barows after leading for most of the way. The colt was then moved up to Group 1 class for the 26th edition of the Grade 1 NHK Mile Cup over 1600 metres at Tokyo Racecourse on 9 May and started at odds of 14/1. He set the pace from the start and maintained his advantage until the last 200 metres but then faded badly and came home twelfth of the seventeen finishers behind Schnell Meister. Pixie Knight was dropped back to sprint distances on 4 July for the Grade 3 CBC Sho a handicap race over 1200 metres at Kokura Racecourse, which saw him matched against older horses for the first time. In a change of tactics he was restrained by Fukunaga in the early stages before producing a strong late run but failed by half a length to overhaul the five-year-old First Force who was carrying a kilogram less.

After a summer break Pixie Knight returned to the track in the Grade 2 Centaur Stakes over 1200 metres at Chukyo on 12 September when he went off the 3.6/1 second favourite behind the four-year-old filly Resistencia. He settled in sixth place before switching to the outside and making sustained progress in the straight to take second place behind Resistencia, beaten a neck by the favourite. On 3 October at Nakayama Racecourse Pixie Knight contested the 55th edition of the Grade 1 Sprinters Stakes and went off at odds of 4.3/1 in a sixteen-runner field. Danon Smash started favourite ahead of Resistencia while the other contenders included First Force, Mozu Superflare (Takamatsunomiya Kinen), Gendarme (Daily Hai Nisai Stakes), Meikei Yell (Tulip Sho), Bien Fait (Hakodate Sprint Stakes), Shivaji (Silk Road Stakes), Taisei Vision (Keio Hai Nisai Stakes), A Will A Way (2020 Silk Road Stakes) and Eighteen Girl (Keeneland Cup). After racing in third place behind Mozu Superflare and Bien Fait made a forward move entering the straight, overtook Mozu Superflare 150 metres from the finish and went clear in the closing stages to win by two lengths from Resistencia. After the race Fukunada said "We got the best position than anyone could have hoped for. From the beginning of his career, I’ve always believed in the strength and potential this colt obtains and have voiced it too, but to be honest, I never thought he would give such a strong performance and land a Grade 1 win this fast. He’s still not physically balanced yet but he will improve, mature and definitely become a target to beat in numerous future sprint races in or outside the country".

Pixie Knight went on to race at the Hong Kong Sprint held at Sha Tin Racecource, where he was involved in a four-horse spill that led to two other horses being euthanized. While Pixie Knight and his jockey Fukunaga both survived, Pixie Knight's legs suffered a fractured radiocarpal bone that took him out of racing for over a year, and Fukunaga suffering a broken collarbone.

Pixie Knight finally returned to the race track at the Takamatsunomiya Kinen on March 26, 2023, with Keita Tosaki as his new jockey as Fukunaga retired to become a horse trainer, but came in 13th place behind First Force. Subsequently, the horse was entered in to several more races later in the year but was unable to win in any of them, before Silk Racing announced that Pixie Knight would be retired from racing on December 27. It was also announced that the horse would stand stud at the Breeders Stallion Station in Hidaka, Hokkaido.

== Racing form ==
Pixie Knight won three races and placed in three others out of 14 starts. The data available is based on JBIS, netkeiba and HKJC.

| Date | Track | Race | Grade | Distance (Condition) | Entry | HN | Odds (Favored) | Finish | Time | Margins | Jockey | Winner (Runner-up) |
|---|---|---|---|---|---|---|---|---|---|---|---|---|
2020 – two-year-old season
| Sep 26 | Chukyo | 2yo Newcomer | | 1,400 m (Firm) | 11 | 8 | 1.7 (1) | 1st | 1:23.4 | –0.1 | Yuichi Fukunaga | (Air Shrub) |
| Nov 23 | Hanshin | Shumeigiku Sho | 1W | 1,400 m (Firm) | 11 | 3 | 2.7 (1) | 3rd | 1:21.7 | 0.4 | Yuichi Fukunaga | Blue Spirit |
2021 – three-year-old season
| Jan 10 | Chukyo | Shinzan Kinen | 3 | 1,600 m (Firm) | 15 | 12 | 13.0 (4) | 1st | R1:33.3 | –0.2 | Yuichi Fukunaga | (Rooks Nest) |
| Apr 17 | Hanshin | Arlington Cup | 3 | 1,600 m (Soft) | 18 | 8 | 4.3 (2) | 4th | 1:34.6 | 0.4 | Yuichi Fukunaga | Ho O Amazon |
| May 9 | Tokyo | NHK Mile Cup | 1 | 1,600 m (Firm) | 18 | 18 | 15.1 (6) | 12th | 1:32.9 | 1.3 | Yuichi Fukunaga | Schnell Meister |
| Jul 4 | Kokura | CBC Sho | 3 | 1,200 m (Firm) | 13 | 11 | 4.4 (2) | 2nd | 1:06.1 | 0.1 | Yuichi Fukunaga | First Force |
| Sep 12 | Chukyo | Centaur Stakes | 2 | 1,200 m (Firm) | 17 | 15 | 4.6 (2) | 2nd | 1:07.2 | 0.0 | Yuichi Fukunaga | Resistencia |
| Oct 3 | Nakayama | Sprinters Stakes | 1 | 1,200 m (Firm) | 16 | 4 | 5.3 (3) | 1st | 1:07.1 | –0.3 | Yuichi Fukunaga | (Resistencia) |
| Dec 12 | Sha Tin | Hong Kong Sprint | 1 | 1,200 m (Firm) | 8 | 2 | 5.4 (3) | DNF | – | – | Yuichi Fukunaga | Sky Field |
2023 – five-year-old season
| Mar 26 | Chukyo | Takamatsunomiya Kinen | 1 | 1,200 m (Heavy) | 18 | 11 | 17.4 (8) | 13th | 1:12.9 | 1.4 | Keita Tosaki | First Force |
| May 13 | Tokyo | Keio Hai Spring Cup | 2 | 1,400 m (Firm) | 18 | 9 | 8.9 (5) | 8th | 1:20.7 | 0.4 | Keita Tosaki | Red Mon Reve |
| Sep 10 | Hanshin | Centaur Stakes | 2 | 1,200 m (Firm) | 15 | 10 | 6.6 (4) | 8th | 1:07.7 | 0.5 | Keita Tosaki | T M Spada |
| Oct 1 | Nakayama | Sprinters Stakes | 1 | 1,200 m (Firm) | 16 | 3 | 16.0 (7) | 8th | 1:08.6 | 0.6 | Keita Tosaki | Mama Cocha |
| Dec 23 | Hanshin | Hanshin Cup | 2 | 1,400 m (Firm) | 17 | 6 | 14.8 (6) | 15th | 1:20.2 | 0.9 | Bauyrzhan Murzabayev | Win Marvel |

Legend:
Turf

- R indicated that it was a record finish time.

== Pedigree ==
Pedigree of Pixie Knight (JPN), bay colt, 2018
| Sire Maurice (JPN) 2011 | Screen Hero (JPN); 2004 | Grass Wonder (USA) | Silver Hawk |
| Sire Maurice (JPN) 2011 | Screen Hero (JPN); 2004 | Grass Wonder (USA) | Ameriflora |
| Sire Maurice (JPN) 2011 | Screen Hero (JPN); 2004 | Running Heroine | Sunday Silence (USA) |
| Sire Maurice (JPN) 2011 | Screen Hero (JPN); 2004 | Running Heroine | Dyna Actress |
| Sire Maurice (JPN) 2011 | Mejiro Frances (JPN); 2001 | Carnegie (IRE) | Sadler's Wells (USA) |
| Sire Maurice (JPN) 2011 | Mejiro Frances (JPN); 2001 | Carnegie (IRE) | Detroit (FR) |
| Sire Maurice (JPN) 2011 | Mejiro Frances (JPN); 2001 | Mejiro Monterey | Mogami (FR) |
| Sire Maurice (JPN) 2011 | Mejiro Frances (JPN); 2001 | Mejiro Monterey | Mejiro Quincey |
| Dam Pixie Hollow (JPN) 2010 | King Halo (JPN); 1995 | Dancing Brave (USA) | Lyphard |
| Dam Pixie Hollow (JPN) 2010 | King Halo (JPN); 1995 | Dancing Brave (USA) | Navajo Princess |
| Dam Pixie Hollow (JPN) 2010 | King Halo (JPN); 1995 | Goodbye Halo (USA) | Halo |
| Dam Pixie Hollow (JPN) 2010 | King Halo (JPN); 1995 | Goodbye Halo (USA) | Pound Foolish |
| Dam Pixie Hollow (JPN) 2010 | Rhein Regina (JPN); 2002 | Sakura Bakushin O | Sakura Yutaka O |
| Dam Pixie Hollow (JPN) 2010 | Rhein Regina (JPN); 2002 | Sakura Bakushin O | Sakura Hagoromo |
| Dam Pixie Hollow (JPN) 2010 | Rhein Regina (JPN); 2002 | Shinko Angel (USA) | Ogygian |
| Dam Pixie Hollow (JPN) 2010 | Rhein Regina (JPN); 2002 | Shinko Angel (USA) | A Kiss For Luck (Family: 3-d) |
