= Resistencia (horse) =

Japanese Thoroughbred racehorse

Resistencia; レシステンシア
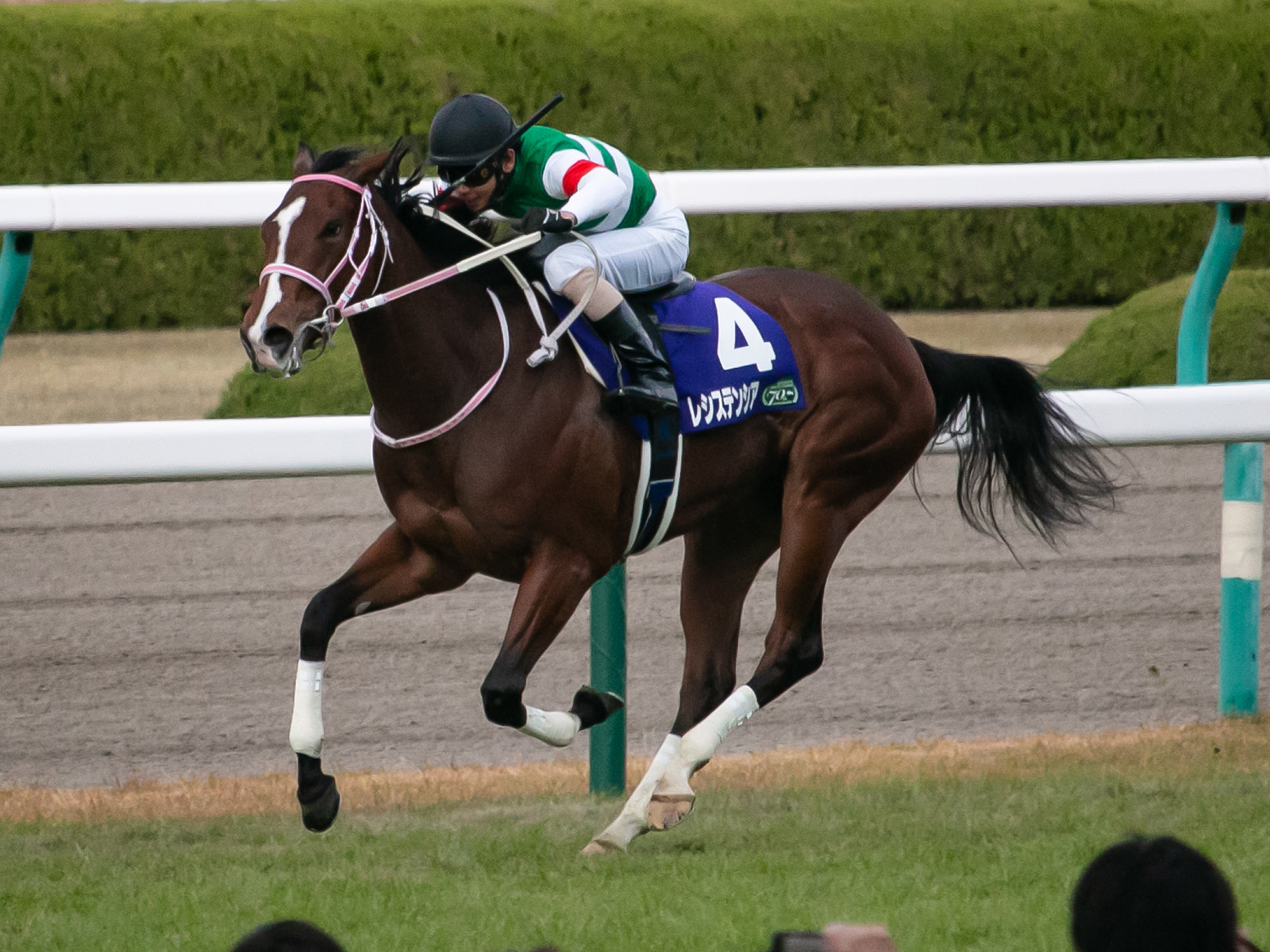
- Resistencia wins the Hanshin Juvenile Fillies
- Sire: Daiwa Major
- Grandsire: Sunday Silence
- Dam: Malacostumbrada
- Damsire: Lizard Island
- Sex: Filly
- Foaled: 15 March 2017
- Country: Japan
- Colour: Bay
- Breeder: Northern Farm
- Owner: U Carrot Farm
- Racing colours
- Trainer: Takeshi Matsushita
- Jockey: Yuichi Kitamura; Christophe Lemaire
- Record: 18: 5-5-2
- Earnings: JRA: ¥449,529,000; Overseas: ¥76,089,100

Major wins
- Fantasy Stakes (2019); Hanshin Juvenile Fillies (2019); Hankyu Hai (2021); Centaur Stakes (2021)

Awards
- JRA Award for Best Two-Year-Old Filly (2019)

Resistencia (Japanese: レシステンシア, foaled 15 March 2017) is a retired Japanese Thoroughbred racehorse and broodmare. She was the leading juvenile filly in Japan in 2019 when she was unbeaten in three starts including the Fantasy Stakes and the Hanshin Juvenile Fillies. In 2020 she ran second in both the Oka Sho and the NHK Mile Cup.

== Background ==
Resistencia is a bay filly with a white blaze bred in Japan by Northern Farm. During her racing career she was trained by Takeshi Matsushita and raced in the green, white and red colours of the Northern Farm affiliate U Carrot Farm.

She was from the ninth crop of foals sired by Daiwa Major, an outstanding miler whose wins included the Tenno Sho, Mile Championship and Yasuda Kinen. As a breeding stallion he has also sired Major Emblem, Curren Black Hill (NHK Mile Cup), Reine Minoru (Oka Sho) and Admire Mars. Resistencia's dam Malacostumbrada was a successful racehorse in her native Argentina, winning the Group 1 Gran Premio Gilberto Lerena in 2014. She came from a female-line family which had produced numerous major winners in South America as well as Hawk Wing, La Lorgnette, Bayakoa and Kitasan Black.

== Racing career ==
=== 2019: two-year-old season ===
Resistencia was ridden in all of her 2019 starts by Yuichi Kitamura. Resistencia made her track debut in a contest for previously unraced juveniles over 1400 metres at Kyoto Racecourse on 14 October and won from Key Dia and sixteen others. On 2 November, over the same course and distance, the filly was stepped up in class for the Grade 3 Fantasy Stakes and started at odds of 12.6/1 in a fifteen-runner field. After racing in second place for most of the way she took the lead early in the straight and kept on well to win by a length from the favourite Dream Castle with Clear Sound a neck away in third place.

On 8 December at Hanshin Racecourse Resistencia was moved up to the highest level for the Hanshin Juvenile Fillies over 1600 metres and was made the 10.2/1 fourth choice in the betting behind Ria Amelia (Artemis Stakes), Woman's Heart (Niigata Nisai Stakes) and Cravache d'Or (runner-up in the Saudi Arabia Royal Cup). Of the other twelve runners only Christie, Maltese Diosa, Yamakatsu Mermaid and Lotus Land started at odds of less than 160/1. Resistencia took the lead from the start and was never challenged, drawing away from her opponents in the straight to win by five lengths and a nose from Maltese Diosa and Cravache d'Or. Her winning time of 1:32.7 was a new record for the race, beating the 1:33.1 set by Vodka in 2006. After the race Kitamura commented "I knew she had the necessary speed as long as she broke well so I concentrated on keeping her relaxed in the middle stages. We were hoping she would mature mentally and I'm happy to see that she was calm and relaxed today. She was so strong and has so much potential. Her future is definitely something to look forward to".

In January 2020, at the JRA Awards for 2019, Resistencia was unanimously named Best Two-Year-Old Filly, taking all 274 votes. In the official Japanese rankings Resistencia was rated the best two-year-old filly of 2019, six pounds ahead of Ria Amelia and Woman's Heart.

=== 2020: three-year-old season ===
On her first run as a three-year-old Resistencia started 2/5 favourite for the Grade 2 Tulip Sho over 1600 metres at Hanshin on 7 March but after leading for most of the way she sustained her first defeat as she was overtaken in the closing stages and finished third, beaten a nose and one and a quarter lengths by Maltese Diosa and Cravache d'Or. Despite her defeat in the Tulip Sho the filly started favourite for the Oka Sho over the same course and distance five weeks later. With Yutaka Take taking over the ride from Kitamura she settled in second place behind the front-running Smile Kana before taking the lead in the straight but was run down in the final strides and beaten into second place by Daring Tact. Christophe Lemaire took the ride when Resistencia was matched against colts in the Grade 1 NHK Mile Cup at Tokyo Racecourse on 10 May and started the 2/1 favourite in an eighteen-runner field. The race was dominated from the start by Resistencia and the colt Lauda Sion, with the filly getting the better of an early struggle for the lead before succumbing in the closing stages and finishing second, beaten one and a half lengths by her male rival. Resistencia sustained a leg fracture in the race and was off the track for six months.

Resistencia returned to the track for the Grade 1 Mile Championship over 1600 metres at Hanshin on 22 November in which she was ridden by Kitamura and went off the 8.9/1 fourth choice in a seventeen-runner field. She took the lead from the start and maintained her advantage until the last 200 metres when she was overtaken and faded to finish eighth behind Gran Alegria.

=== 2021: four-year-old season ===
Resistencia started her four-year-old season with the Hankyu Hai as the most favored and went on to mark her 3rd graded win, setting the course record for the 1400m of Hanshin Racecourse at 1:19.2. She then went on to run in the Takamatsunomiya Kinen and was the most favored there also, but lost by a neck to Danon Smash. She went on to run in the Victoria Mile (of which she finished at sixth place) before taking a 4-month-long break from racing.

Resistencia returned to racing by running and winning the Centaur Stakes, marking her 4th graded win. She then went on to run in the Sprinters Stakes with Lemaire once again riding her, only to come in second place. After this, she made her first trip abroad to compete in the Hong Kong Sprint, with Christophe Soumillon as her jockey. She finished second in that race with 3/4 lengths behind the winner Sky Field.

=== 2022 and 2023 ===
Recistencia went on to run in the Takamatsunomiya Kinen for the 2nd year in a row at the start of her five-year-old season, this time with Takeshi Yokoyama as her jockey. She was the favored horse of the race, but finished 6th to Naran Huleg. She then competed in the Victoria Mile and came in third behind Sodashi and Fine Rouge. After the Vicotira Mile, Resistencia ran in the Yasuda Kinen but came in 11th place, and soon after it was announced that Resistencia sustained a leg fracture once more and was off the track for several months.

She returned to racing to compete in the Hong Kong Sprint for the second time, but finished in 13th place. Resistencia made her final run at the 1351 Turf Sprint at the King Abdulaziz Racetrack on February 25, 2023, where she finished at 5th place behind Bathrat Leon. After her final race, it was announced by her owner, Carrot Racing, that she will become a broodmare at the Northern Farm.

== Racing form ==
Resistencia had won five races and placed in another seven out of 18 starts. The data available is based on JBIS, netkeiba and HKJC.

Date	Track	Race	Grade	Distance (Condition)	Entry	HN	Odds (Favored)	Finish	Time	Margins	Jockey	Winner (Runner-up)
2019 – two-year-old season
Oct 14	Kyoto	2yo Newcomer		1,400 m (Good)	18	13	1.4 (1)	1st	1:22.9	–0.2	Yutaka Take	(Key Dia)
Nov 2	Kyoto	Fantasy Stakes	3	1,400 m (Firm)	15	6	13.6 (6)	1st	1:20.7	–0.2	Yuichi Kitamura	(Magic Castle)
Dec 8	Hanshin	Hanshin Juvenile Fillies	1	1,600 m (Firm)	16	4	11.2 (4)	1st	R1:32.7	–0.8	Yuichi Kitamura	(Maltese Diosa)
2020 – three-year-old season
Mar 7	Hanshin	Tulip Sho	2	1,600 m (Firm)	14	4	1.4 (1)	3rd	1:33.5	0.2	Yuichi Kitamura	Maltese Diosa
Apr 12	Hanshin	Oka Sho	1	1,600 m (Soft)	18	17	3.7 (1)	2nd	1:36.3	0.2	Yutaka Take	Daring Tact
May 10	Tokyo	NHK Mile Cup	1	1,600 m (Firm)	18	3	3.0 (1)	2nd	1:32.7	0.2	Christophe Lemaire	Lauda Sion
Nov 22	Hanshin	Mile Championship	1	1,600 m (Firm)	17	2	9.9 (4)	8th	1:32.8	0.8	Yuichi Kitamura	Gran Alegria
2021 – four-year-old season
Feb 28	Hanshin	Hankyu Hai	3	1,400 m (Firm)	17	8	2.4 (1)	1st	R1:19.2	–0.3	Yuichi Kitamura	(Mikki Brillante)
Mar 28	Chukyo	Takamatsunomiya Kinen	1	1,200 m (Soft)	18	16	2.9 (1)	2nd	1:09.2	0.0	Suguru Hamanaka	Danon Smash
May 16	Tokyo	Victoria Mile	1	1,600 m (Firm)	18	18	7.1 (2)	6th	1:31.9	0.9	Yutaka Take	Gran Alegria
Sep 12	Chukyo	Centaur Stakes	2	1,200 m (Firm)	17	8	1.9 (1)	1st	1:07.2	0.0	Christophe Lemaire	(Pixie Knight)
Oct 3	Nakayama	Sprinters Stakes	1	1,200 m (Firm)	16	12	3.4 (2)	2nd	1:07.4	0.3	Christophe Lemaire	Pixie Knight
Dec 12	Sha Tin	Hong Kong Sprint	1	1,200 m (Firm)	12	12	4.4 (2)	2nd	1:08.8	0.1	Christophe Soumillon	Sky Field
2022 – five-year-old season
Mar 27	Chukyo	Takamatsunomiya Kinen	1	1,200 m (Soft)	18	7	2.2 (1)	6th	1:08.6	0.3	Takeshi Yokoyama	Naran Huleg
May 15	Tokyo	Victoria Mile	1	1,600 m (Firm)	18	7	12.8 (6)	3rd	1:32.5	0.3	Takeshi Yokoyama	Sodashi
Jun 5	Tokyo	Yasuda Kinen	1	1,600 m (Firm)	18	16	21.0 (9)	11th	1:32.7	0.4	Takeshi Yokoyama	Songline
Dec 11	Sha Tin	Hong Kong Sprint	1	1,200 m (Firm)	14	14	6.8 (4)	13th	1:09.8	1.0	Joao Moreira	Wellington
2023 – six-year-old season
Feb 25	King Abdulaziz	1351 Turf Sprint	2	1,351 m (Firm)	11	10	– (7)	5th	1:17.8	0.3	Ryan Moore	Bathrat Leon

Legend:
Turf

- R indicates that it was a finish with a record time.

== Pedigree ==
Pedigree of Resistencia (JPN), bay filly 2017
Sire Daiwa Major (JPN) 2001	Sunday Silence (USA); 1986	Halo	Hail to Reason
Sire Daiwa Major (JPN) 2001	Sunday Silence (USA); 1986	Halo	Cosmah
Sire Daiwa Major (JPN) 2001	Sunday Silence (USA); 1986	Wishing Well	Understanding
Sire Daiwa Major (JPN) 2001	Sunday Silence (USA); 1986	Wishing Well	Mountain Flower
Sire Daiwa Major (JPN) 2001	Scarlet Bouquet (JPN); 1988	Northern Taste (CAN)	Northern Dancer
Sire Daiwa Major (JPN) 2001	Scarlet Bouquet (JPN); 1988	Northern Taste (CAN)	Lady Victoria
Sire Daiwa Major (JPN) 2001	Scarlet Bouquet (JPN); 1988	Scarlet Ink (USA)	Crimson Satan
Sire Daiwa Major (JPN) 2001	Scarlet Bouquet (JPN); 1988	Scarlet Ink (USA)	Consentida
Dam Malacostumbrada (ARG) 2010	Lizard Island (USA); 1995	Danehill Dancer (IRE)	Danehill (USA)
Dam Malacostumbrada (ARG) 2010	Lizard Island (USA); 1995	Danehill Dancer (IRE)	Mira Adonde (USA)
Dam Malacostumbrada (ARG) 2010	Lizard Island (USA); 1995	Add	Spectacular Bid
Dam Malacostumbrada (ARG) 2010	Lizard Island (USA); 1995	Add	Number
Dam Malacostumbrada (ARG) 2010	Mapul Wells (ARG); 2002	Poliglote (GB)	Sadler's Wells (USA)
Dam Malacostumbrada (ARG) 2010	Mapul Wells (ARG); 2002	Poliglote (GB)	Alexandrie (USA)
Dam Malacostumbrada (ARG) 2010	Mapul Wells (ARG); 2002	Pulma	New Dandy
Dam Malacostumbrada (ARG) 2010	Mapul Wells (ARG); 2002	Pulma	Pulina (Family: 9-g)
