= Danon Smash =

Japanese Thoroughbred racehorse

Danon Smash; ダノンスマッシュ
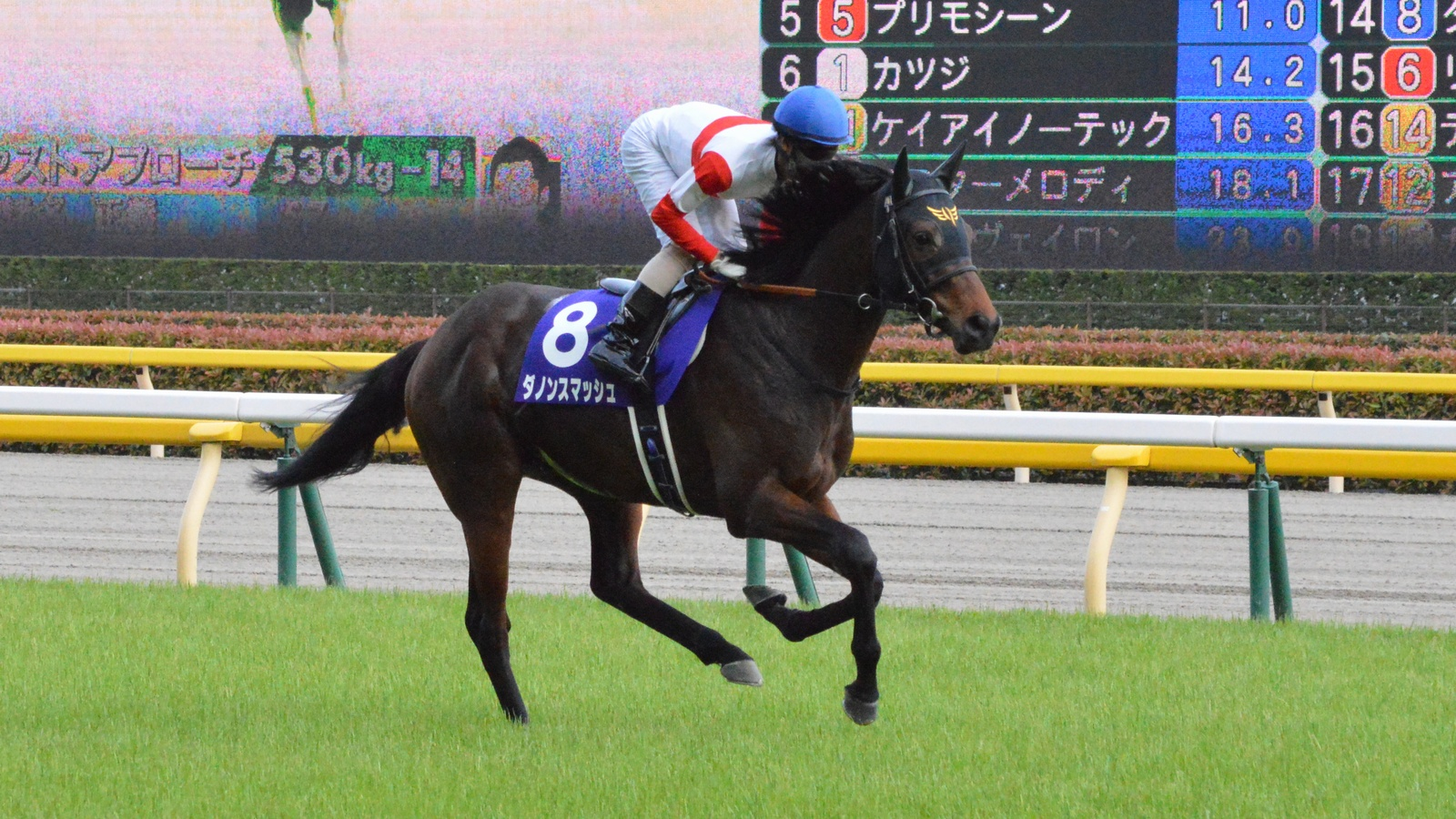
- Danon Smash in 2018
- Sire: Lord Kanaloa
- Grandsire: King Kamehameha
- Dam: Spinning Wildcat
- Damsire: Hard Spun
- Sex: Stallion
- Foaled: 6 March 2015
- Country: Japan
- Colour: Bay
- Breeder: K I Farm
- Owner: Danox Co Ltd
- Racing colours
- Trainer: Takayuki Yasuda
- Jockey: Yuichi Kitamura; Yuga Kawada
- Record: 26: 11-3-1
- Earnings: ¥584,353,000 + HK$12,540,000 (ca. $7 million)

Major wins
- Keihan Hai (2018); Silk Road Stakes (2019); Keeneland Cup (2019); Ocean Stakes (2020); Keio Hai Spring Cup (2020); Centaur Stakes (2020); Hong Kong Sprint (2020); Takamatsunomiya Kinen (2021)

Danon Smash (Japanese: ダノンスマッシュ foaled 6 March 2015) is a Japanese Thoroughbred racehorse best known for his performances in sprint races. He won twice as a juvenile in 2017 and took two more races, including the Grade 3 Keihan Hai as a three-year-old the following year. In 2019 he began to emerge as a top-class sprinter as he recorded further Grade 3 victories in the Silk Road Stakes and the Keeneland Cup as well as running third in the Grade 1 Sprinters Stakes. He improved again as a five-year-old when he won the Ocean Stakes, Keio Hai Spring Cup and Centaur Stakes in Japan and the Group 1 Hong Kong Sprint in Hong Kong. On his first run of 2021 he won the Takamatsunomiya Kinen at the third attempt.

== Background ==
Danon Smash is a bay horse with a white star bred in Japan by K I Farm. During his track career he carried the red and white colours of Danox Co Ltd the business software enterprise of his owner Masahiro Noda, and was trained by Takayuki Yasuda.

Danon Smash was from the first crop of foals sired by Lord Kanaloa, an outstanding sprinter-miler who was the 2013 Japanese Horse of the Year. Lord Kanaloa's other progeny include Almond Eye, Saturnalia and Tagaloa. Danon Smash's dam Spinning Wildcat was a Kentucky-bred mare who won one minor race from six starts in the United States. On 4 November 2013 as a four-year-old she was put up for auction at the Fasig-Tipton Sale at Lexington, Kentucky and was bought by K I Farm for $600,000. Spinning Wildcat was a half-sister to the Breeders' Cup Mile winner War Chant, being a daughter of the exceptional racemare Hollywood Wildcat whose wins included the Breeders' Cup Distaff, Hollywood Oaks and Gamely Handicap.

== Racing career ==
=== 2017: two-year-old season ===
Danon Smash began his racing career by finishing second in a contest for previously unraced juveniles over 1400 metres on firm ground at Niigata Racecourse on 2 September. Three weeks later he recorded his first success as he won a maiden race over the same distance at Hanshin Racecourse. On 15 October he followed up at Kyoto Racecourse by taking the Momiji Stakes. The colt was then moved up sharply in class for the Grade 1 Asahi Hai Futurity Stakes over 1600 metres at Hanshin on 17 December when he started at odds of 7.7/1 and finished fifth, four and a half lengths behind the winner Danon Premium as he finished well after recovering from a poor start.

=== 2018: three-year-old season ===
On his first run as a three-year-old Danon Smash started favourite for the Grade 3 Falcon Stakes at Chukyo Racecourse on 17 March but finished seventh behind Mr Melody after racing towards the rear of the field for most of the 1400 metre trip. In the Arlington Cup over 1600 metres at Hanshin in April he was ridden closer to the lead before coming home fifth behind Tower of London, finishing two and a half lengths behind the winner. In the Grade 1 NHK Mile Cup at Tokyo Racecourse in May he raced in second place for most of the way before tiring in the closing stages and finishing seventh of the eighteen runners behind Keiai Nautique.

Danon Smash was dropped back to sprint distances for his three remaining starts of 2018, starting with the Hakodate Nikkan Sport Hai at Hakodate Racecourse in July when he won from Amalfi Coast and fourteen others. At Sapporo Racecourse in August he was matched against older horses for the first time and ran second to the five-year-old mare Nac Venus in the Grade 3 Keeneland Cup. The colt ended his season in the Grade 3 Keihan Hai over 1200 metres at Kyoto Racecourse in which he was ridden by Yuichi Kitamura and started the 2.4/1 favourite in an eighteen-runner field. After settling behind the leaders Danon Smash took the lead in the straight and won by one and three quarter lengths from the seven-year-old gelding Nine Tails.

=== 2019: four-year-old season ===
Danon Smash began his third campaign by starting favourite the Grade 3 Silk Road Stakes over 1200 metres at Chukyo on 27 January. With Kitamura in the saddle he raced in fifth before finishing strongly to win by one and a quarter lengths from Estitato. Yasuda later commented "I was worried when he turned into the stretch. I even thought he’d lost the race there but he was able to rally... I think he will still improve". When stepped up to Grade 1 class for the Takamatsunomiya Kinen at Chukyo in March he started favourite but came home fourth behind Mr Melody, Seiun Kosei and Shonan Anthem, beaten just over a length by the winner.

Yuga Kadada took over as Danaon Smash's jockey for his next two races. After an absence of five months, the horse returned for a second attempt at the Keeneland Cup on 25 August and went off the 1.3/1 favourite in an eighteen-runner field. After settling in sixth place as Nac Venus set the pace he took the lead in the straight and won by a length from Tower of London. Five weeks later the colt started favourite for the Group 1 Sprinters Stakes at Nakayama Racecourse and produced his customary late run but was unable to overhaul the leaders and finished a close third, beaten half a length and a neck by Tower of London and Mozu Superflare. For his final run of 2019 Danon Smash was sent to Hong Kong's Sha Tin Racecourse to contest the Hong Kong Sprint on 9 December and came home eighth of the twelve runners behind the locally-trained Beat The Clock, beaten two and three quarter lengths by the winner.

=== 2020: five-year-old season ===
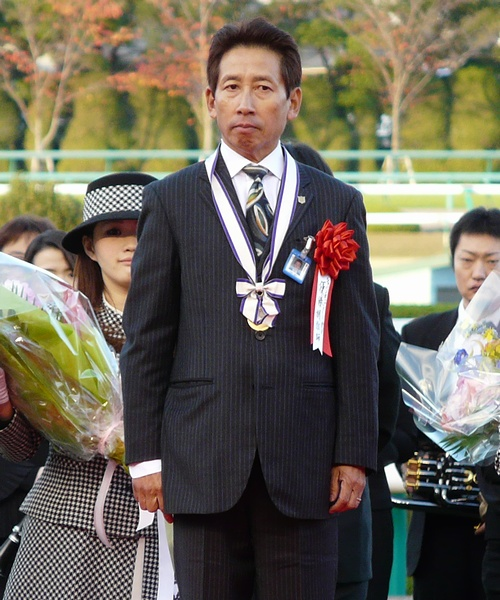
Danon Smash's trainer Takayuki Yasuda

On his first appearance as a five-year-old, Danon Smash was partnered by Yuga Kawada in the Grade 3 Ocean Stakes at Nakayama on 7 March. Going off favourite, he recovered from a poor start to race in fourth place behind the outsider Engelchein before taking the lead in the straight and winning by one and a half lengths from Nac Venus, with Tower of London three lengths back in third place. Yasuda commented "I was worried for a moment at the break but he picked it up immediately. Going in to the straight he looked to still have a lot left and I thought he had a chance if he got a clean run. With a furlong left he was still going strong". In his second attempt to win the Takamatsunomiya Kinen on 29 April, the horse started third favourite but "never fired" on the yielding ground and came home tenth behind Kurino Gaudi. The "winner" was subsequently disqualified for causing interference and the race was awarded to Mozu Superflare.

Danon Smash was then stepped up in trip for Grade 2 Keio Hai Spring Cup over 1400 metres at Tokyo on 16 May in which he was ridden by the Australian jocken Damian Lane and started the 3.9/1 second favourite behind Tower of London. In a change of tactics he led from the start and won by one and a quarter lengths from the Mile Championship winner Stelvio. After the race Yasuda said "he moved quickly to the top from the gate and even though he was chased by the eventual runner-up the whole way, he was able to pull away at the end. It was a strong race and I don’t think it gets any better." He was moved up in distance again for a very strong renewal 1600 metre Yasuda Kinen on 7 June. Starting a 73/1 outsider he led for most of the way before tiring in the last 200 metres and coming home eighth behind Gran Alegria.

After a three month summer break, Danon Smash returned to the track in the Grade 2 Centaur Stakes at Chukyo on 13 September when he was partnered by Kosei Miura and started the 2/1 favourite against sixteen opponents including Mr Melody, Seiun Kosei and Kurino Gaudi. After settling in fourth place behind the front-running Seiun Kosai he gained the advantage in the closing stages and won by a length and a neck from Meisho Glocke and Mr Melody. On 4 October at Nakayama, the horse ran for the second time in the Sprinters Stakes and stayed on well in the straight to take second place behind Gran Alegria, beaten two lengths by the winner.

As in the previous year, Danon Smash ended his season at Sha Tin and was ridden by Ryan Moore as he contested his second Hong Kong Sprint on 13 December. He started a 21.8/1 outsider in a fourteen-runner field which also included Tower of London, Hot King Prawn (Jockey Club Sprint), Classique Legend, Voyage Warrior (2020 Sprint Cup) and Rattan (2019 Sprint Cup). After racing in mid-division, Danon Smash made rapid progress on the outside, took the lead inside the last 200 metres and "kept on well" to win by a length from the locally-trained outsider Jolly Banner. After the race Moore said "He broke really well, ran on the pace feeling good, and I was able to slot into a lovely spot. When the pace steadied around the bend, I was able to just move out and keep moving forward and he got there in plenty of time. He was very tough and very honest – a pleasure to ride." Yasuda, who was unable to travel to Hong Kong owing to COVID-19 restrictions commented "I actually wasn’t able to watch it live and before I could see the video all these people started calling me saying ‘Congratulations!’ so when I did watch I knew winning was a sure thing. It couldn’t be better."

=== 2021: six-year-old season ===
On his return from Japan Danon Smash had to go into quarantine and Yasuda opted to go straight for the Takamatsunomiya Kinen on 28 March without a prep race. Ridden by Kawada, Danon Smash started the 5/1 second choice in the betting behind Resistencia in a field of eighteen runners which also included Lauda Sion, Indy Champ, Danon Fantasy and Mozu Superflare. In a race run on yielding ground, Danon Smash was positioned on the outside in tenth place as Mozu Superflare set the pace, before making steady progress in the straight. Danon Smash joined the leaders 100 metres from the finish and prevailed by a neck from Resistencia with Indy Champ a further neck away in third place. After the race Kawada said "I knew that the ground condition was going to be the key factor but I decided not to make any plan and let the horse race where he wants to... He responded really well at the fourth corner and, although there was a long duel in the stretch, he showed his strength at the end. Last year's result was very disappointing so I’m really glad he was able to register his first Grade 1 title in Japan." On 25 April Danon Smash made a third trip to Hong Kong to contest the Group 1 Chairman's Sprint Prize, but despite starting the 6/5 favourite he never looked likely to win and came home sixth behind the improving four-year-old Wellington.

In the summer, he was rested and prepared for the autumn campaign in the Sprinters Stakes. In the race, he managed to run in three-wide at fifth position but gassed out near the end and fell from possible fourth to finish in sixth place. The next race would be his final race which was an attempt to defend his title in the Hong Kong Sprint. The race turned out to be a mess with a disaster collision between four horses, which affected Danon Smash's pace and he ended up in eighth place. On December 21, Danon Smash retired from racing and assigned for a stud duty at Breeders Stallion Station in Hidaka, Hokkaido.

== Racing form ==
Danon Smash won 11 and placed in another four races in 26 starts. This data is available in JBIS, netkeiba and HKJC.

| Date | Track | Race | Grade | Distance (Condition) | Entry | HN | Odds (Favored) | Finish | Time | Margins | Jockey | Winner (Runner-up) |
|---|---|---|---|---|---|---|---|---|---|---|---|---|
2017 – two-year-old season
| Sep 2 | Niigata | 2yo Newcomer | | 1,400 m (Firm) | 18 | 6 | 1.7 (1) | 2nd | 1:23.0 | 0.0 | Keita Tosaki | Lancement |
| Sep 24 | Hanshin | 2yo Maiden | | 1,400 m (Firm) | 13 | 3 | 2.2 (1) | 1st | 1:21.9 | –0.3 | Yuichi Fukunaga | (Love Kampf) |
| Oct 15 | Kyoto | Momiji Stakes | OP | 1,400 m (Good) | 8 | 5 | 1.5 (1) | 1st | 1:23.4 | –0.5 | Yuichi Fukunaga | (Adel Weise) |
| Dec 17 | Hanshin | Asahi Hai Futurity Stakes | 1 | 1,600 m (Firm) | 16 | 12 | 8.7 (4) | 5th | 1:34.0 | 0.7 | Yuichi Fukunaga | Danon Premium |
2018 – three-year-old season
| Mar 17 | Chukyo | Falcon Stakes | 3 | 1,400 m (Firm) | 16 | 9 | 2.2 (1) | 7th | 1:22.6 | 0.5 | Keita Tosaki | Mr Melody |
| Apr 14 | Hanshin | Arlington Cup | 3 | 1,600 m (Firm) | 13 | 13 | 12.2 (6) | 5th | 1:33.8 | 0.4 | Yuichi Kitamura | Tower of London |
| May 6 | Tokyo | NHK Mile Cup | 1 | 1,600 m (Firm) | 18 | 8 | 75.0 (13) | 7th | 1:33.2 | 0.4 | Yuichi Kitamura | Keiai Nautique |
| Jul 21 | Hakodate | Hakodate Nikkan Sports Hai | ALW (3W) | 1,200 m (Firm) | 16 | 10 | 4.8 (3) | 1st | 1:08.4 | –0.2 | Yuichi Kitamura | (Amalfi Coast) |
| Aug 26 | Sapporo | Keeneland Cup | 3 | 1,200 m (Good) | 16 | 7 | 6.4 (4) | 2nd | 1:09.8 | 0.4 | Yuichi Kitamura | Nac Venus |
| Nov 25 | Kyoto | Keihan Hai | 3 | 1,200 m (Firm) | 18 | 3 | 3.4 (1) | 1st | 1:08.0 | –0.3 | Yuichi Kitamura | (Nine Tails) |
2019 – four-year-old season
| Jan 27 | Kyoto | Silk Road Stakes | 3 | 1,200 m (Firm) | 18 | 2 | 2.0 (1) | 1st | 1:08.3 | –0.2 | Yuichi Kitamura | (Estitato) |
| Mar 24 | Chukyo | Takamatsunomiya Kinen | 1 | 1,200 m (Firm) | 18 | 13 | 2.5 (1) | 4th | 1:07.5 | 0.2 | Yuichi Kitamura | Mr Melody |
| Jun 16 | Hakodate | Hakodate Sprint Stakes | 3 | 1,200 m (Good) | 7 | 6 | – | Scratched | – | – | Yuga Kawada | Kaiser Melange |
| Aug 25 | Sapporo | Keeneland Cup | 3 | 1,200 m (Good) | 16 | 13 | 2.3 (1) | 1st | 1:09.2 | –0.1 | Yuga Kawada | (Tower of London) |
| Sep 29 | Nakayama | Sprinters Stakes | 1 | 1,200 m (Firm) | 16 | 2 | 2.8 (1) | 3rd | 1:07.2 | 0.1 | Yuga Kawada | Tower of London |
| Dec 8 | Sha Tin | Hong Kong Sprint | 1 | 1,200 m (Firm) | 12 | 7 | 4.7 (3) | 8th | 1:08.5 | 0.4 | Lanfranco Dettori | Beat The Clock |
2020 – five-year-old season
| Mar 7 | Nakayama | Ocean Stakes | 3 | 1,200 m (Firm) | 16 | 2 | 2.0 (1) | 1st | 1:07.4 | –0.2 | Yuga Kawada | (Nac Venus) |
| Mar 29 | Chukyo | Takamatsunomiya Kinen | 1 | 1,200 m (Soft) | 18 | 6 | 4.1 (3) | 10th | 1:09.7 | 1.0 | Yuga Kawada | Mozu Superflare |
| May 16 | Tokyo | Keio Hai Spring Cup | 2 | 1,400 m (Good) | 13 | 13 | 4.9 (2) | 1st | 1:19.8 | –0.2 | Damian Lane | (Stelvio) |
| Jun 7 | Tokyo | Yasuda Kinen | 1 | 1,600 m (Good) | 14 | 14 | 73.6 (8) | 8th | 1:32.4 | 0.8 | Kosei Miura | Gran Alegria |
| Sep 13 | Chukyo | Centaur Stakes | 2 | 1,200 m (Firm) | 17 | 16 | 3.0 (1) | 1st | 1:07.9 | –0.2 | Kosei Miura | (Meisho Glocke) |
| Oct 4 | Nakayama | Sprinters Stakes | 1 | 1,200 m (Firm) | 16 | 3 | 5.1 (3) | 2nd | 1:08.6 | 0.3 | Yuga Kawada | Gran Alegria |
| Dec 13 | Sha Tin | Hong Kong Sprint | 1 | 1,200 m (Firm) | 14 | 5 | 4.7 (3) | 1st | 1:08.5 | 0.0 | Ryan Moore | (Jolly Banner) |
2021 – six-year-old season
| Mar 28 | Chukyo | Takamatsunomiya Kinen | 1 | 1,200 m (Soft) | 18 | 14 | 6.0 (2) | 1st | 1:09.2 | 0.0 | Yuga Kawada | (Resistencia) |
| Apr 25 | Sha Tin | Chairman's Sprint Prize | 1 | 1,200 m (Firm) | 13 | 1 | 1.4 (1) | 6th | 1:09.3 | 0.7 | Joao Moreira | Wellington |
| Oct 3 | Nakayama | Sprinters Stakes | 1 | 1,200 m (Firm) | 16 | 14 | 2.6 (1) | 6th | 1:07.8 | 0.7 | Yuga Kawada | Pixie Knight |
| Dec 12 | Sha Tin | Hong Kong Sprint | 1 | 1,200 m (Firm) | 12 | 3 | 6.5 (4) | 8th | 1:19.9 | 11.2 | Yuga Kawada | Sky Field |

Legend:
Turf

== Pedigree ==
Pedigree of Danon Smash (JPN), bay stallion, 2015
| Sire Lord Kanaloa (JPN) 2008 | King Kamehameha (JPN); 2001 | Kingmambo (USA) | Mr Prospector |
| Sire Lord Kanaloa (JPN) 2008 | King Kamehameha (JPN); 2001 | Kingmambo (USA) | Miesque |
| Sire Lord Kanaloa (JPN) 2008 | King Kamehameha (JPN); 2001 | Manfath (IRE) | Last Tycoon |
| Sire Lord Kanaloa (JPN) 2008 | King Kamehameha (JPN); 2001 | Manfath (IRE) | Pilot Bird (GB) |
| Sire Lord Kanaloa (JPN) 2008 | Lady Blossom (JPN); 1996 | Storm Cat (USA) | Storm Bird (CAN) |
| Sire Lord Kanaloa (JPN) 2008 | Lady Blossom (JPN); 1996 | Storm Cat (USA) | Terlingua |
| Sire Lord Kanaloa (JPN) 2008 | Lady Blossom (JPN); 1996 | Saratoga Dew (USA) | Cormorant |
| Sire Lord Kanaloa (JPN) 2008 | Lady Blossom (JPN); 1996 | Saratoga Dew (USA) | Super Luna |
| Dam Spinning Wildcat (USA) 2009 | Hard Spun (USA); 2004 | Danzig | Northern Dancer (CAN) |
| Dam Spinning Wildcat (USA) 2009 | Hard Spun (USA); 2004 | Danzig | Pas de Nom |
| Dam Spinning Wildcat (USA) 2009 | Hard Spun (USA); 2004 | Turkish Tryst | Turkoman |
| Dam Spinning Wildcat (USA) 2009 | Hard Spun (USA); 2004 | Turkish Tryst | Darbyvail |
| Dam Spinning Wildcat (USA) 2009 | Hollywood Wildcat (USA); 1990 | Kris S. | Roberto |
| Dam Spinning Wildcat (USA) 2009 | Hollywood Wildcat (USA); 1990 | Kris S. | Sharp Queen |
| Dam Spinning Wildcat (USA) 2009 | Hollywood Wildcat (USA); 1990 | Miss Wildcatter | Mr Prospector |
| Dam Spinning Wildcat (USA) 2009 | Hollywood Wildcat (USA); 1990 | Miss Wildcatter | Elizabeth K (Family: 4-r) |

- Danon Smash is inbred 4 × 4 to Mr Prospector, meaning that this stallion appears twice in the fourth generation of his pedigree.
