= Naran Huleg =

Japanese Thoroughbred racehorse

Naran Huleg; ナランフレグ
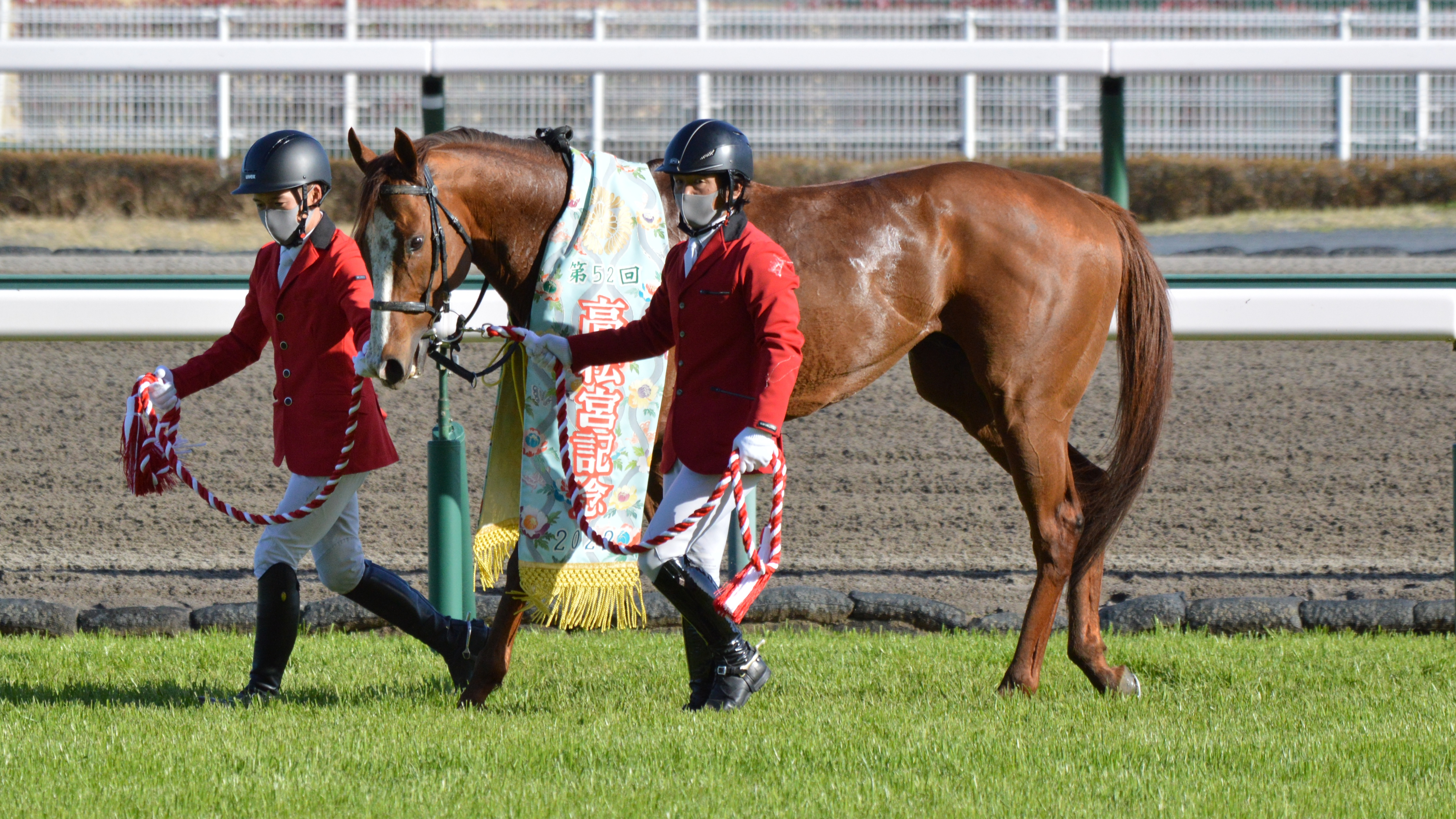
- Naran Huleg in 2022
- Sire: Gold Allure
- Grandsire: Sunday Silence
- Dam: Kelley's Beauty
- Damsire: Brian's Time
- Sex: Stallion
- Foaled: 5 April 2016
- Country: Japan
- Colour: Chestnut
- Breeder: Setsuko Sakato
- Owner: Kimio Saijo; Katsushige Muraki
- Racing colours
- Trainer: Yoshitada Munakata
- Jockey: Kyosuke Maruta
- Record: 37: 6-5-4
- Earnings: ¥400,137,000

Major wins
- Takamatsunomiya Kinen (2022)
- Last updated on 2026-10-31

Naran Huleg (Japanese: ナランフレグ foaled 5 April 2016) is a Japanese Thoroughbred racehorse. A specialist sprinter he showed good, but unremarkable form in his early career, winning a race on dirt as a two-year-old in 2018 and three minor races on turf in the following year. He failed to win for over two years before winning the Tanzanite Stakes in December 2021 although he ran well in defeat in several races in the interim. As a six-year-old in 2022 he recorded an upset victory in the Grade 1 Takamatsunomiya Kinen.

== Background ==
Naran Huleg is a chestnut horse with a broad white blaze bred in Japan by Setsuko Sakato. He was sent into training with Yoshitada Munakata and initially raced in the ownership of Kimio Saijo.

He was from the twelfth crop of foals sired by Gold Allure, a leading performer on dirt in Japan whose wins included the Tokyo Daishōten, Japan Dirt Derby, Derby Grand Prix and February Stakes. Naran Huleg's dam Kelley's Beauty was campaigned exclusively on dirt and showed some racing ability, winning four minor races from seventeen starts. She was a distant female-line descendant of the British broodmare Frustrate who was exported to Japan in 1907 and was the ancestor of many major winners in that country.

== Racing career ==
=== 2018: two-year-old season ===
As a two-year-old in 2018 Naran Huleg was campaigned exclusively on dirt. He made his racecourse debut in a contest for previously unraced juveniles over 1300 metres at Tokyo Racecourse on 8 October when he was ridden by Kyosuke Maruta and started at odds of 6.9/1. He raced in third place before taking the lead in the straight and won by one and three quarter lengths from the filly Kanashibari. In two subsequent starts that year he finished sixth in the Cattleya Sho at Tokyo in November and third in the Kantsubaki Sho at Chukyo Racecourse in December.

=== 2019: three-year-old season ===
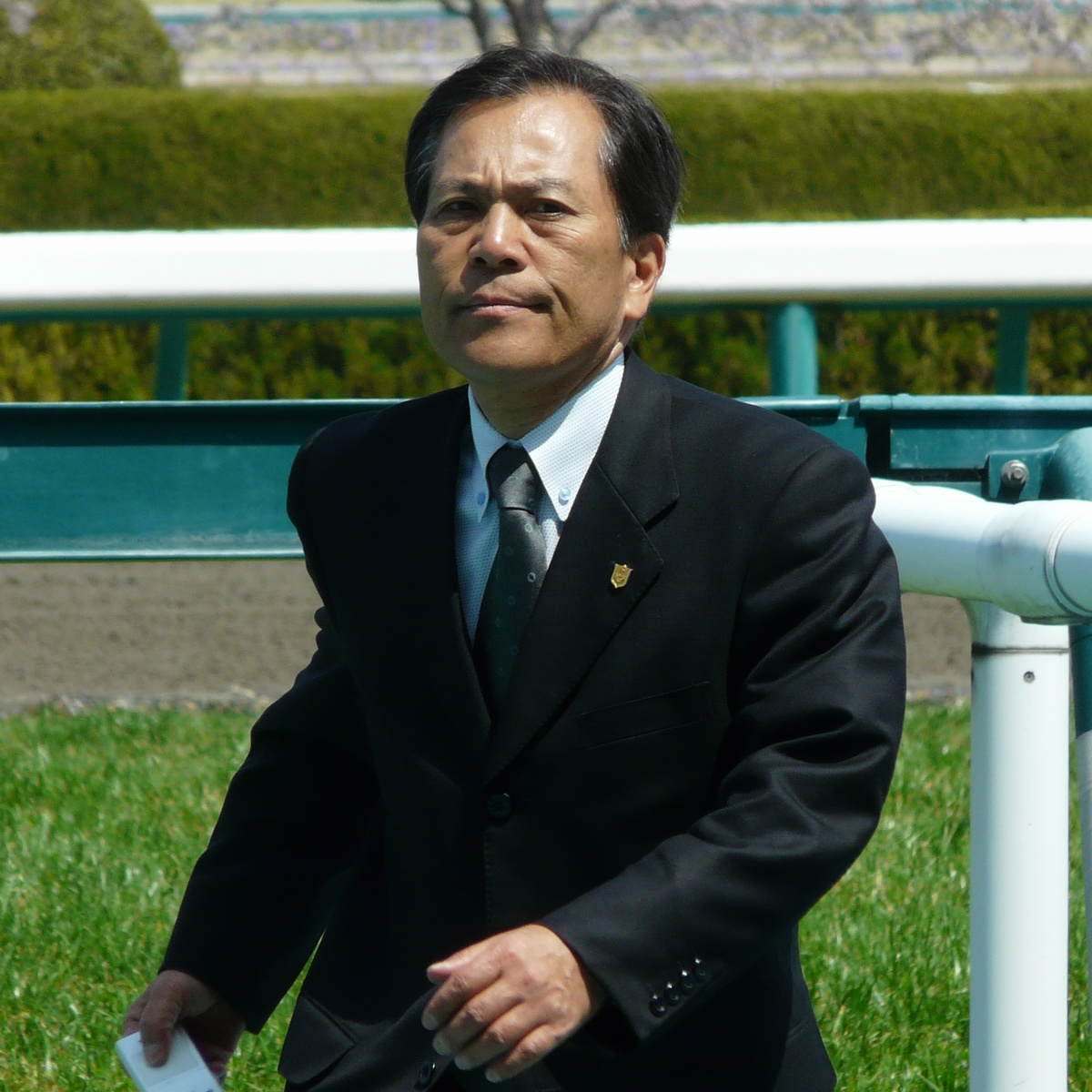
Naran Huleg's trainer Yoshitada Munakata

In his race as a three-year-old Naran Huleg finished second to Timing Now in the Gogyo Sho on dirt at Chukyo and then came home sixth in a minor dirt race at Nakayama Racecourse in March. He made his turf debut at Fukushima Racecourse in April and finished unplaced in the Yukiusagi Sho before finishing fifth in a minor race on dirt at Tokyo in the following month. For the rest of his career Naran Huleg raced exclusively on turf. On 27 July at Niigata Racecourse the colt was ridden by Keita Tosaki when he started at odds of 6.4/1 for the Seno Tokubetsu over 1000 metres and won by two lengths from Fast As Ever. At the same track in August he started 3/1 favourite for the Iide Tokubetsu over 1200 metres. Ridden by Tosaki he turned into the straight in twelfth place before launching a strong run on the outside, took the lead 100 metres out and won by one and a half lengths from the four-year-old filly Seiun Ririshii. He went on to finish fifth in the September Stakes over 1200 metres at Nakayama and then came home seventh in the Okutama Stakes at Tokyo in November. On his final run of the year Naran Huleg was ridden by Kyosuke Maruta when he started the 4.6/1 third choice in the betting for the Hamamatsu Stakes over 1200 metres at Chukyo on 15 December. After settling towards the rear of the field he switched to the outside and made rapid progress in the straight, gained the advantage inside the last 200 metres and accelerated away from his rivals in the closing stages to win by two and a half lengths.

=== 2020: four-year-old season ===
On his first run as a four-year-old Naran Huleg was stepped up in class to contest the Grade 3 Silk Road Stakes over 1200 metres at Kyoto Racecourse on 2 February and finished third behind A Will A Way and Eighteen Girl. He went on to finish sixth in the Listed Shunrai Stakes at Nakayama in April and fifth in the Idaten Stakes at Niigata in May. He ran twice in summer, finishing ninth in the Grade Ibis Summer Dash over 1000 metres at Niigata in July and seventh in the Listed Toki Stakes over 1400 metres at the same track in August. After a break of seven weeks he returned to the track in the Listed Shinetsu Stakes at Niigata on 18 October and came home seventh behind Gendarme.

=== 2021: five-year-old season ===
Naran Huleg began his fourth campaign in the Listed Yodo Tankyori Stakes over 1200 metres at Chukyo on 9 January and finished second to Travesura, beaten one and a half lengths by the winner. He then ran sixth in the Shunrai Stakes in April, second to Kurino Gaudi in the Kurama Stakes at Chukyo in May and fourth in the TVH Sho at Sapporo Racecourse in June. Before the last of these races he had been transferred to the ownership of Katsushige Muraki. He made little impact in his next two races, finishing tenth in the Toki Stakes on 29 August and tenth again behind Resistencia in the Centaur Stakes at Chukyo on 12 September. He showed better form on his next start as he ran second to Savoir Aimer in the Listed Opal Stakes over 1200 metres at Hanshin on 9 October. Naran Huleg had been without a win for over two years when he contested the Tanzanite Stakes over 1200 metres at Hanshin on 18 December and started the 3.3/1 second favourite in a fifteen-runner field. After being restrained towards the rear by Maruta he weaved his way through the field in the straight and got up in the final strides to win by a neck from Leggiero.

=== 2022-3: six and seven-year-old season ===
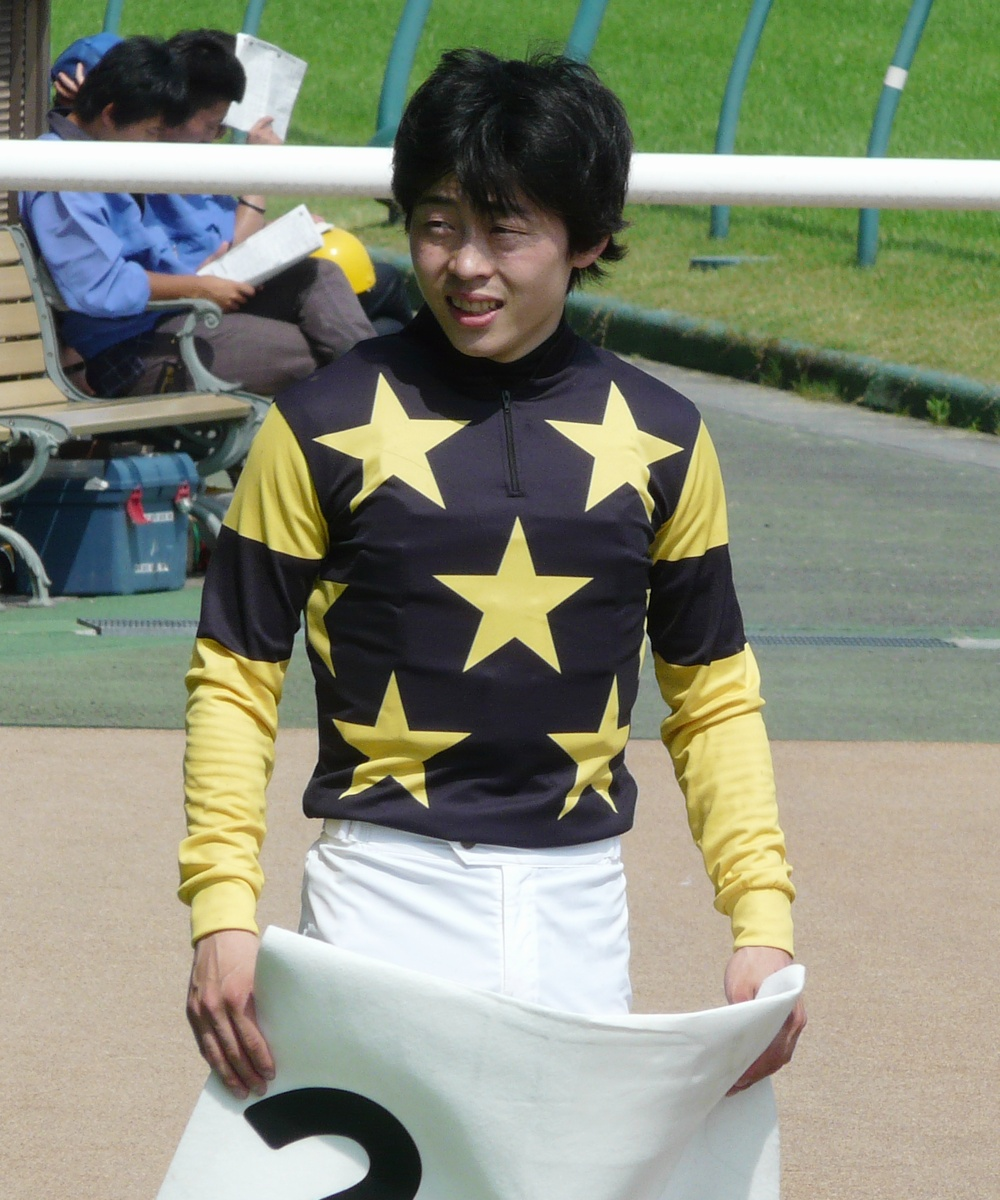
Naran Huleg's regular jockey Kyosuke Maruta

On his first run of 2022 Naran Huleg ran for the second time in the Silk Road Stakes and finished third behind Meikei Yell and Shine Garnet, beaten just over a length by the winner. On 5 March at Nakayama he ran second to Gendarme in the Grade 3 Ocean Stakes.

Naran Huleg was then stepped up to Grade 1 class for the first time and started a 26.9/1 outsider for the Takamatsunomiya Kinen over 1200 metres on soft ground at Tokyo on 27 March. Resistencia started favourite while the other sixteen runners included Grenadier Guards, Salios, Meikei Yell, Kurino Gaudi and Gendarme. After racing towards the rear as usual Naran Huleg began to make rapid progress along the inside rail in the straight. In the last 200 metres he threaded his way through the field, joined the leaders in the final strides and prevailed in a five-way blanket finish, winning by a neck from the five-year-old mare Lotus Land with Kir Lord, Travesura and Meikei Yell finishing just behind. Yoshitada Munakata, who was winning his first Grade 1 race as a trainer commented "I’m very happy and a bit relieved... Though we would have preferred a better ground, he showed his usual strong charge in the stretch against a strong field." Kyosuke Maruta said "Racing from the rear is his usual style so I just concentrated on keeping the horse’s rhythm. He has never experienced heavy ground before but handled it well. I took him through the inner course with confidence as I did in the Tanzanite Stakes. I was really happy when we were able to break free before the wire."

On 5 June Naran Huleg was stepped up in distance to contest the Yasuda Kinen over 1600 metres at Tokyo. He started a 51/1 outsider and came home ninth of the eighteen runners behind Songline. After a summer break Naran Huleg raced in the Sprinters Stakes but finished third behind Gendarme. Naran Huleg then went on to race his first race abroad at the Hong Kong Sprint, held at the Sha Tin Racecourse in Hong Kong, but finished at an unimpressive 10th place.

Naran Huleg ran several races in 2023, but retired from racing after finishing 9th at the Sprinters Stakes. He is scheduled to stand stud at the Versailles Farm in Hidaka, Hokkaido.

== Racing form ==
Naran Huleg won six races in 37 starts. This data is available at JBIS, netkeiba and HKJC.

Date	Track	Race	Grade	Distance (Condition)	Entry	HN	Odds (Favored)	Finish	Time	Margins	Jockey	Winner (Runner-up)
2018 – two-year-old season
Oct 8	Tokyo	2yo debut		1,300 m (Fast)	16	9	7.9 (6)	1st	1:20.0	–0.3	Kyosuke Maruta	(Kanashibari)
Nov 24	Tokyo	Cattleya Sho	ALW (1W)	1,600 m (Fast)	14	12	52.8 (7)	6th	1:39.2	0.9	Kyosuke Maruta	Make Happy
Dec 15	Chukyo	Kantsubaki Sho	ALW (1W)	1,400 m (Good)	13	7	30.6 (6)	3rd	1:26.1	0.5	Kyosuke Maruta	Oval Ace
2019 – three-year-old season
Feb 2	Chukyo	Gogyo Sho	ALW (1W)	1,200 m (Good)	11	5	4.8 (3)	2nd	1:12.3	0.3	Kyosuke Maruta	Timing Now
Mar 30	Nakayama	3yo Allowance	1W	1,200 m (Fast)	16	5	5.3 (4)	6th	1:11.6	0.3	Kyosuke Maruta	Nasuno Dake
Apr 13	Fukushima	Yukiusagi Sho	ALW (1W)	1,200 m (Firm)	15	5	11.4 (6)	10th	1:10.3	1.0	Keishi Yamada	Shonan Taiga
May 25	Tokyo	3yo Allowance	1W	1,400 m (Fast)	16	14	3.6 (2)	5th	1:25.7	0.9	Keita Tosaki	Keiai Viridian
Jul 27	Niigata	Senko Tokubetsu	ALW (1W)	1,000 m (Firm)	18	8	7.4 (2)	1st	0:54.6	–0.2	Keita Tosaki	(Fast as Ever)
Aug 31	Niigata	Iide Tokubetsu	ALW (2W)	1,200 m (Firm)	18	18	4.1 (1)	1st	1:08.7	–0.2	Keita Tosaki	(Seiun Ririshi)
Sep 21	Nakayama	September Stakes	ALW (3W)	1,200 m (Firm)	15	6	3.2 (1)	5th	1:07.9	0.3	Keita Tosaki	Estate
Nov 10	Tokyo	Okutama Stakes	ALW (3W)	1,400 m (Firm)	14	5	17.8 (8)	7th	1:21.8	0.4	Yutaro Nonaka	Lilac Color
Dec 15	Chukyo	Hamamatsu Stakes	ALW (3W)	1,200 m (Firm)	17	6	5.6 (3)	1st	1:08.2	–0.4	Kyosuke Maruta	(Predicament)
2020 – four-year-old season
Feb 2	Kyoto	Silk Road Stakes	3	1,200 m (Firm)	18	15	14.8 (8)	3rd	1:09.1	0.1	Kyosuke Maruta	A Will a Way
Apr 12	Nakayama	Shunrai Stakes	L	1,200 m (Good)	16	9	5.7 (3)	6th	1:08.5	0.2	Kyosuke Maruta	Loving Answer
May 24	Niigata	Idaten Stakes	OP	1,000 m (Firm)	16	8	4.5 (2)	5th	0:54.5	0.3	Kyosuke Maruta	Lion Boss
July 26	Niigata	Ibis Summer Dash	3	1,000 m (Firm)	18	5	12.5 (5)	9th	0:54.8	0.3	Kyosuke Maruta	Jo Kana Chan
Aug 30	Niigata	Toki Stakes	L	1,400 m (Firm)	18	8	6.7 (2)	7th	1:21.4	0.2	Kyosuke Maruta	Catedral
Oct 18	Niigata	Shinetsu Stakes	L	1,400 m (Firm)	16	7	9.4 (4)	7th	1:21.4	0.5	Kyosuke Maruta	Gendarme
2021 – five-year-old season
Jan 9	Chukyo	Yodo Tankyori Stakes	L	1,200 m (Firm)	16	2	11.6 (5)	2nd	1:08.4	0.2	Kyosuke Maruta	Travesura
Apr 11	Nakayana	Shunrai Stakes	L	1,200 m (Firm)	16	12	10.9 (5)	6th	1:07.7	0.4	Kosei Miura	Gendarme
May 9	Chukyo	Kurama Stakes	OP	1,200 m (Firm)	15	5	4.1 (1)	2nd	1:07.2	0.1	Kyosuke Maruta	Kurino Gaudi
Jun 26	Sapporo	TVh Sho	OP	1,200 m (Firm)	14	4	5.6 (3)	4th	1:08.0	0.2	Yuji Tannai	Lord Aqua
Aug 29	Niigata	Toki Stakes	L	1,400 m (Firm)	18	6	7.3 (3)	10th	1:21.5	0.5	Kyosuke Maruta	Kaiser Minoru
Sep 12	Chukyo	Centaur Stakes	2	1,200 m (Firm)	17	13	65.2 (11)	10th	1:08.0	0.8	Kyosuke Maruta	Resistencia
Oct 9	Hanshin	Opal Stakes	L	1,200 m (Firm)	16	5	11.8 (5)	2nd	1:08.3	0.1	Kyosuke Maruta	Savoir Aimer
Dec 18	Hanshin	Tanzanite Stakes	OP	1,200 m (Firm)	15	2	4.3 (2)	1st	1:08.5	0.0	Kyosuke Maruta	(Leggiero)
2022 – six-year-old season
Jan 30	Chukyo	Silk Road Stakes	3	1,200 m (Firm)	18	10	7.0 (3)	3rd	1:08.3	0.2	Kyosuke Maruta	Meikei Yell
Mar 5	Nakayama	Ocean Stakes	3	1,200 m (Firm)	15	10	8.2 (4)	2nd	1:08.0	0.1	Kyosuke Maruta	Gendarme
Mar 27	Chukyo	Takamatsunomiya Kinen	1	1,200 m (Soft)	18	2	27.8 (8)	1st	1:08.3	0.0	Kyosuke Maruta	(Lotus Land)
Jun 5	Tokyo	Yasuda Kinen	1	1,600 m (Firm)	18	18	52.1 (12)	9th	1:32.7	0.4	Kyosuke Maruta	Songline
Oct 2	Nakayama	Sprinters Stakes	1	1,200 m (Firm)	16	6	18.6 (5)	3rd	1:08.0	0.2	Kyosuke Maruta	Gendarme
Dec 11	Sha Tin	Hong Kong Sprint	1	1,200 m (Good)	14	6	7.4 (5)	10th	1:09.4	0.6	Kyosuke Maruta	Wellington
2023 – seven-year-old season
Mar 4	Nakayama	Ocean Stakes	3	1,200 m (Firm)	16	2	8.4 (3)	9th	1:08.1	0.7	Kyosuke Maruta	Vento Voce
Mar 26	Chukyo	Takamatsunomiya Kinen	1	1,200 m (Heavy)	18	6	19.8 (9)	4th	1:11.8	0.3	Kyosuke Maruta	First Force
Jun 4	Tokyo	Yasuda Kinen	1	1,600 m (Firm)	18	1	147.1 (16)	17th	1:33.3	1.9	Kyosuke Maruta	Songline
Aug 27	Sapporo	Keeneland Cup	3	1,200 m (Soft)	16	2	7.8 (5)	10th	1:11.1	1.2	Kyosuke Maruta	Namura Clair
Oct 1	Nakayama	Sprinters Stakes	1	1,200 m (Firm)	16	4	46.3 (13)	9th	1:08.6	0.6	Kyosuke Maruta	Mama Cocha

Legend:
Turf Dirt

== Pedigree ==
Pedigree of Naran Huleg (JPN), chestnut horse, 2016
Sire Gold Allure (JPN) 1999	Sunday Silence (USA); 1986	Halo	Hail to Reason
Sire Gold Allure (JPN) 1999	Sunday Silence (USA); 1986	Halo	Cosmah
Sire Gold Allure (JPN) 1999	Sunday Silence (USA); 1986	Wishing Well	Understanding
Sire Gold Allure (JPN) 1999	Sunday Silence (USA); 1986	Wishing Well	Mountain Flower
Sire Gold Allure (JPN) 1999	Nikiya (USA); 1993	Nureyev	Northern Dancer
Sire Gold Allure (JPN) 1999	Nikiya (USA); 1993	Nureyev	Special
Sire Gold Allure (JPN) 1999	Nikiya (USA); 1993	Reluctant Guest	Hostage
Sire Gold Allure (JPN) 1999	Nikiya (USA); 1993	Reluctant Guest	Vaguely Royal
Dam Eminent City (JPN) 2001	Brian's Time (USA); 1985	Roberto	Hail to Reason
Dam Eminent City (JPN) 2001	Brian's Time (USA); 1985	Roberto	Bramalea
Dam Eminent City (JPN) 2001	Brian's Time (USA); 1985	Kelley's Day	Graustark
Dam Eminent City (JPN) 2001	Brian's Time (USA); 1985	Kelley's Day	Golden Trail
Dam Eminent City (JPN) 2001	Beauty Cross (JPN); 1991	Tamamo Cross	C B Cross
Dam Eminent City (JPN) 2001	Beauty Cross (JPN); 1991	Tamamo Cross	Green Chateau
Dam Eminent City (JPN) 2001	Beauty Cross (JPN); 1991	Miyamo Beauty	Northern Taste (CAN)
Dam Eminent City (JPN) 2001	Beauty Cross (JPN); 1991	Miyamo Beauty	Hoyo Queen (Family: 1-b)

- Naran Huleg is inbred 4 × 4 to Hail To Reason, meaning that this stallion appears twice in the fourth generation of his pedigree.
