= Songline (horse) =

Japanese Thoroughbred racehorse

Songline; ソングライン
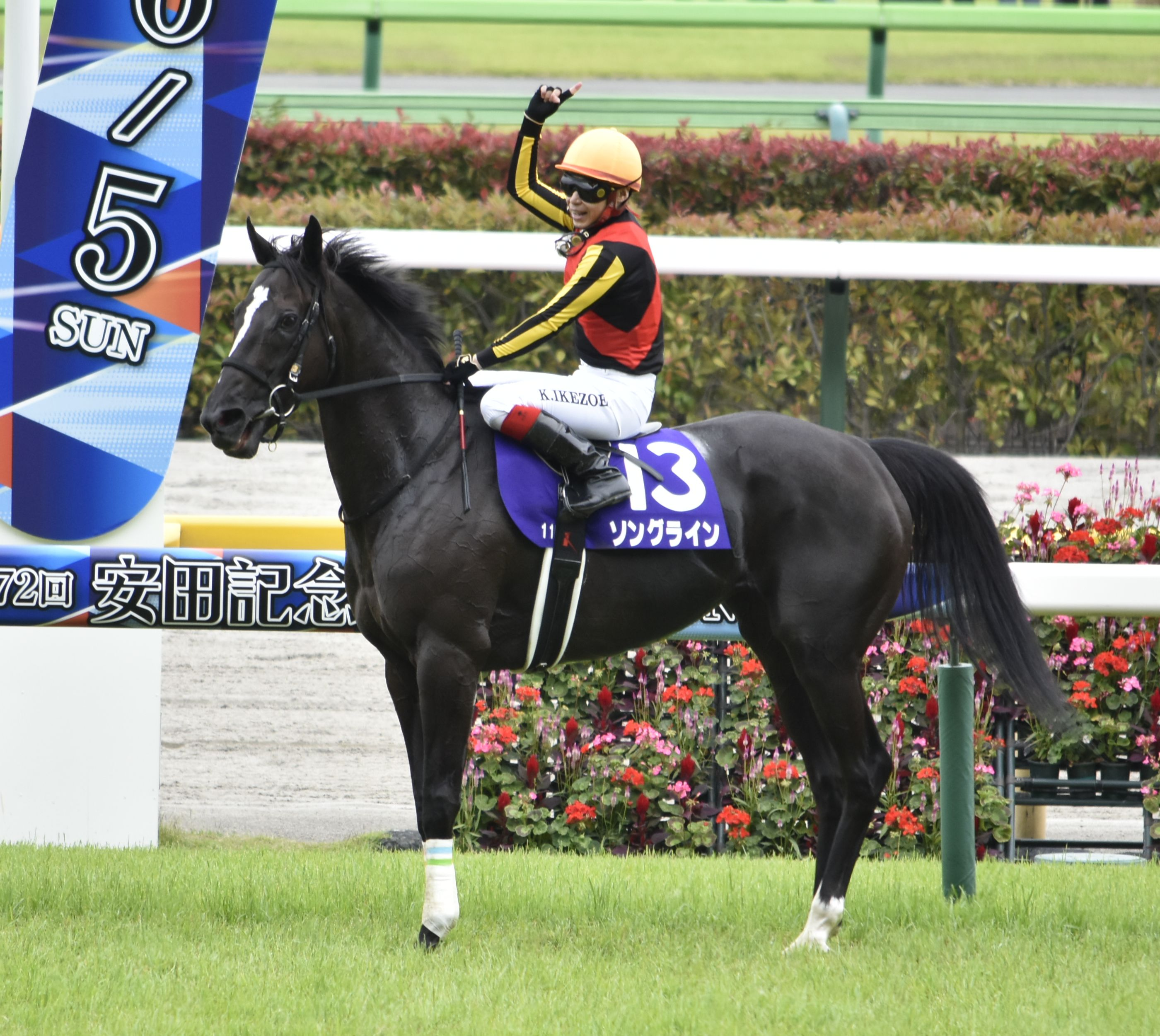
- Songline after winning the Yasuda Kinen
- Sire: Kizuna
- Grandsire: Deep Impact
- Dam: Luminous Parade
- Damsire: Symboli Kris S
- Sex: Mare
- Foaled: 4 March 2018 (age 8)
- Country: Japan
- Colour: Brown
- Breeder: Northern Farm
- Owner: Sunday Racing
- Racing colours
- Trainer: Toru Hayashi
- Jockey: Kenichi Ikezoe; Keita Tosaki
- Record: 15: 7-2-1
- Earnings: 799,991,100 JPY; Japan : 661,306,000 JPY; Saudi : 900,000 USD; USA : 60,000 USD

Major wins
- Fuji Stakes (2021); 1351 Turf Sprint (2022); Yasuda Kinen (2022,2023); Victoria Mile (2023)

Awards
- JRA Award for Best Older Filly or Mare (2023); JRA Award for Best Miler (2023)
- Last updated on January 9, 2024

Songline (Japanese: ソングライン, Hepburn: Songurain, foaled 4 March 2018) is a Japanese retired Thoroughbred racehorse and broodmare. She showed some promise as a two-year-old in 2022 when she won a maiden race on the second of her two starts. She developed into a high-class miler in the following year, winning the Kobai Stakes and Fuji Stakes as well as running second in the NHK Mile Cup. In 2022 she improved again and recorded major successes in the 1351 Turf Sprint and Yasuda Kinen. She was awarded the JRA Award for Best Older Filly or Mare and JRA Award for Best Miler for 2023.

== Background ==
Songline is a brown mare with a white blaze and white socks on her hind legs bred in Japan by Northern Farm. She was sent into training with Toru Hayashi and raced in the black, yellow and red colours of the Northern Farm associate Sunday Racing.

She was from the second crop of foals sired by Kizuna whose wins included the Tokyo Yushun, Prix Niel and Osaka Hai. His other foals have included Akai Ito and Deep Bond. Songline's dam Luminous Parade showed solid racing ability, winning four minor races from twenty-three starts on dirt in Japan. Luminous Parade's granddam Soninke, a British broodmare who was exported to Japan in 2001 was also the female-line ancestor of Logi Universe and Deirdre. Soninke was in turn a daughter of the outstanding racemare Sonic Lady who was not, technically, a Thoroughbred as her female ancestry could not be traced to one of the foundation mares of the breed.

== Racing career ==
=== 2020: two-year-old season ===
Songline began her track career in a contest for previously unraced juveniles over 1400 metres on good ground at Tokyo Racecourse on 20 June when she started the 1.6/1 favourite and finished second to Cool Cat, beaten two lengths by the winner. After a five-month break she returned for a maiden race over 1600 metres at Tokyo on 22 November and started the 2.1/1 second favourite in an eighteen-runner field. Ridden by Genki Maruyama she raced in mid-division before staying on strongly down the centre of the track, overtaking the favourite Tosen Melanie inside the last 200 metres and drawing away to win by three lengths.

=== 2021: three-year-old season ===
On her three-year-old debut Songline was stepped up in class for the Listed Kobai Stakes over 1400 metres at Chukyo Racecourse on 16 January when she was ridden by Christophe Lemaire and went off the 1.9/1 favourite against ten other fillies. She raced in third place, went to the front approaching the last 200 metres and went clear of her rivals to win by three lengths from La La Christine. Toru Hayashi commented "she ran an impeccable race. She was able to get a good position despite the fast pace and gained ground in the final stage". The filly was then elevated to Grade 1 class for the 1600 metre Oka Sho on 11 April at Hanshin Racecourse and started at odds of 13.7/1. She was never in serious contention and came home fifteenth of the eighteen runners behind Sodashi, beaten twelve lengths by the winner. Hayashi reported that there was "nothing amiss" with his trainee but suggested that she may have been unsuited by the right-handed track. Four weeks after her run in the Oka Sho Songline was matched against male opposition in the Grade 1 NHK Mile Cup in which she was ridden by Kenichi Ikezoe and started at odds of 15.9/1 in an eighteen-runner field. She raced just behind the leaders, made a strong run on the outside in the straight and gained the advantage from the favourite Grenadier Guards 200 metres from the finish only to be run down in the final stride and beaten a nose by Schnell Meister.

After a break of more than three months Songline returned in the Grade 3 Sekiya Kinen over 1600 metres at Niigata Racecourse in which she faced older horses. She started the odds-on favourite but finished third behind the four-year-old filly Lotus Land and the five-year-old horse Karate. On 23 October at Tokyo, with Ikezoe in the saddle, Songline contested the Grade 2 Fuji Stakes and started the 2.9/1 favourite against seventeen opponents including the previous Group 1 winners Danon The Kid, Wagnerian and Lauda Sion. After racing in mid-division she produced a sustained run down the centre of the straight, took the lead 200 metres from the finish and held off the late challenge of Satono Wizard to win by a neck. On her final run of the year the filly started favourite for the 1400 metre Hanshin Cup in December but ran poorly and finished thirteenth behind Grenadier Guards.

=== 2022: four-year-old season ===
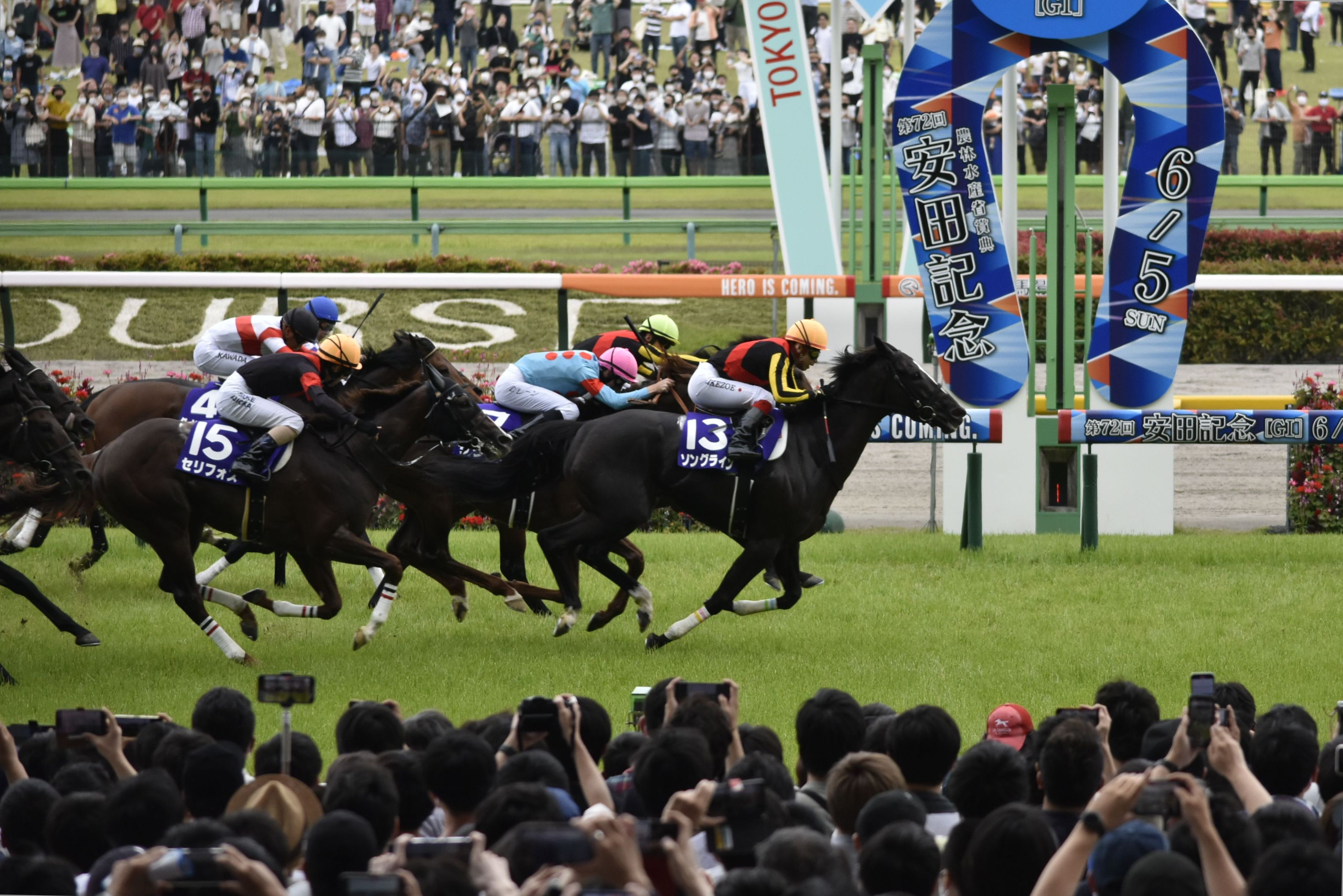
Songline wins the Yasuda Kinen

For her first run of 2022, Songline was sent to Saudi Arabia to contest the $1.5 million 1351 Sprint Cup over 1351 meters at King Abdulaziz Racecourse in Riyadh where she was ridden by Lemaire and started 5/1 second favourite behind Naval Crown. After racing in mid-division she made sustained progress in the straight, got the better of the British filly Happy Romance in the last 100 metres and held off the late run of the American challenger Casa Creed to win by a neck. Hayashi commented "She is such a brilliant filly and the ride from Lemaire was perfect. The owners also deserve great credit for their ambition in coming here. Last year she raced well in this counter-clockwise direction and she has a lot of natural speed so we thought we could run well coming back in distance a little."

Songline's first appearance of the year in Japan came at Tokyo on 15 May when she started 4.4/1 second favourite for the Grade 1 Victoria Mile. She raced in ninth place before making steady progress in the straight but never looked likely to win and came home fifth, two and a half lengths behind the winner Sodashi. Hayashi felt that she had been unsuited by the slow early pace. Ikezoe took the ride when the filly started the 7.2/1 fourth choice in the betting for the Grade 1 Yasuda Kinen over the same course and distance three weeks later. The four-year-old Elusive Panther started favourite while the other contenders included Cafe Pharoah, Salios, Danon The Kid, Schnell Meister and Naran Huleg (Takamatsunomiya Kinen). She settled behind the leaders as Ho O Amazon set the pace before moving on the outside on the final turn and making rapid progress in the straight. She took the lead from Salios 100 metres from the finish and held on to win by a neck from Schnell Meister. After the race Ikezoe said "It was a tight schedule for the filly but the staff at the stables prepared her remarkably. She broke well and I decided to settle her behind Salios... Trying not to make the same mistake as last time, we made an early bid before the last corner and she responded well and stretched all the way for a strong finish".

=== 2023: five-year-old season ===
For her first run of 2023, she returned to Saudi Arabia to defend her title at the 1351 Sprint Cup over 1351 meters. She was ridden by Lemaire again and started as 15/8 favorite. She was held up towards the rear and had no response in the final furlong finishing in 10th place behind fellow Japanese runner Bathrat Leon who broke the track record.

She made her second appearance in the Victoria Mile over at the Tokyo Racecourse starting as the 66/10 fourth favorite behind Stars on Earth, Namur, and Sodashi, ridden by Keita Tosaki this time. As the race progressed, she settled at the middle of the pack by the rails. Entering the final straight, she engaged on a straightline battle with the defending winner Sodashi from a furlong out and finally won by a head securing her second Grade 1 win.

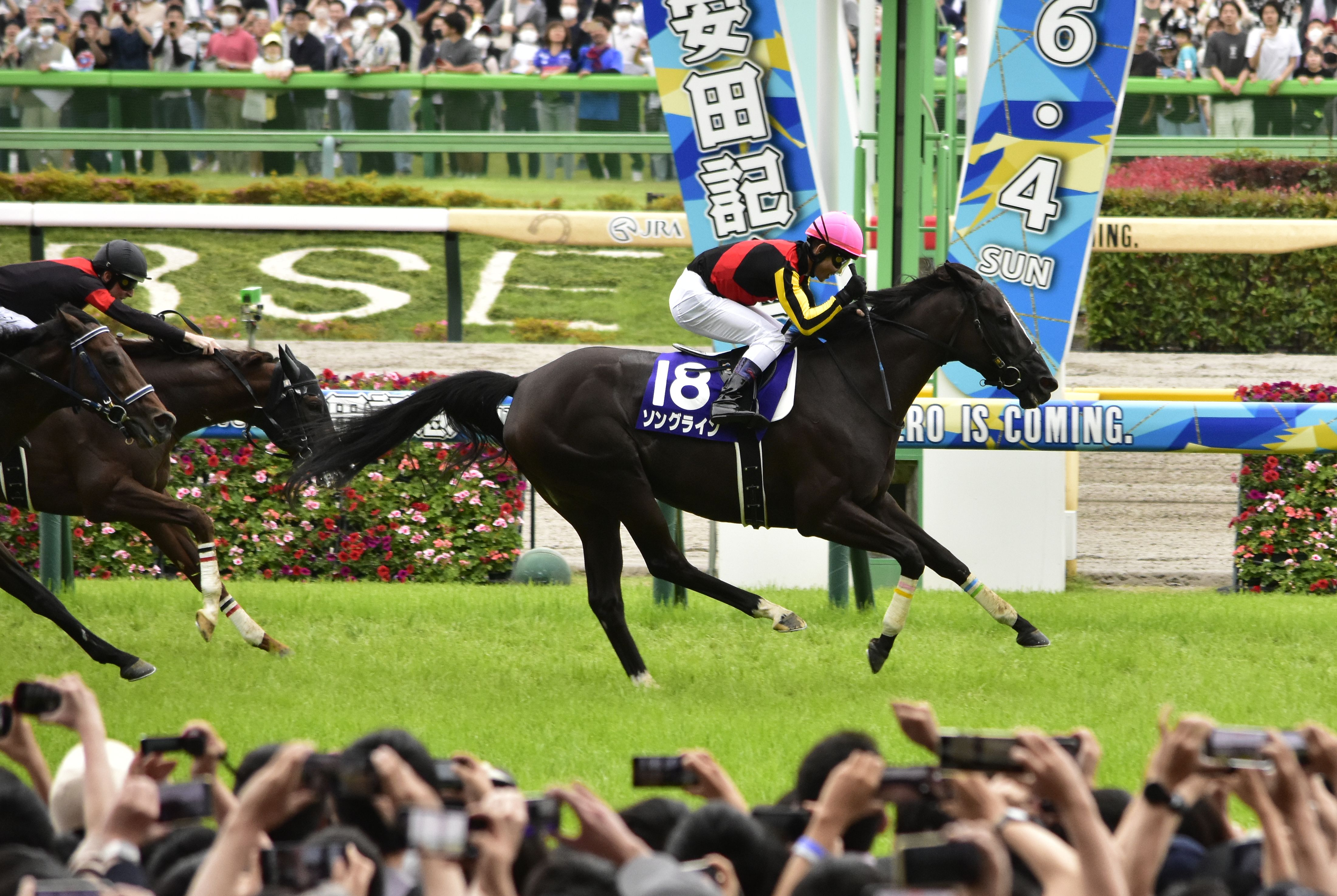
Songline defends her Yasuda Kinen title

Three weeks after her Victoria Mile win, she was entered into the Yasuda Kinen to defend her title against 9 other Grade 1 winners which included Osaka Hai winner Jack d'Or, Mile Championship winner Serifos, Asahi Hai Futurity Stakes winner Dolce More, three of the last NHK Mile Cup winners Schnell Meister, Danon Scorpion, Champagne Color, Cafe Pharoah, Takamatsunomiya Kinen winner Naran Huleg, and lastly her Victoria Mile rival Sodashi. She was ridden again by Keita Tosaki starting from the farthest gate from the rail. He ran her wide at the middle of the pack all throughout until they entered the final straight. Sweeping from the outside, she passed Champagne Color nearing 2 furlongs left with an accelerated dash forward at around a furlong left overtaking Jack d'Or and Serifos who were battling it from the inside, winning the race and defending her title by a length and a quarter from Serifos. She became the fourth horse ever to win the Yasuda Kinen back-to-back after Swee Sue, Yamanin Zephyr, and Vodka. She's also the second horse after Vodka to complete the Victoria Mile and Yasuda Kinen double in the same year.

After the Yasuda Kinen, Songline was entered in to the Mainichi Okan, where she came in second behind Elton Barows, before being sent to the United States to compete in the Breeders' Cup Mile. She ultimately finished in 5th place in what would become her final race behind Master of The Seas. On November 22, Songline's owner Sunday Racing announced that both she and Schnell Meister would retire from racing at the same time, with Songline herself returning to Northern Farm to become a broodmare.

== Racing form ==
Songline won seven races out of 17 starts. This data is available in JBIS, netkeiba, racingpost and Breeders' Cup.

Date	Track	Race	Grade	Distance (Condition)	Entry	HN	Odds (Favored)	Finish	Time	Margins	Jockey	Winner (Runner-up)
2020 – two-year-old season
Jun 20	Tokyo	2yo Newcomer		1,400 m (Good)	16	10	2.6 (1)	2nd	1:23.7	0.3	Damian Lane	Cool Cat
Nov 22	Tokyo	2yo Maiden		1,600 m (Firm)	18	3	3.1 (2)	1st	1:34.1	–0.5	Genki Maruyama	(Tosen Melanie)
2021 – three-year-old season
Jan 16	Chukyo	Kobai Stakes	L	1,400 m (Firm)	11	6	2.9 (1)	1st	1:20.6	–0.5	Christophe Lemaire	(La La Christine)
Apr 11	Hanshin	Oka Sho	1	1,600 m (Firm)	18	16	14.7 (7)	15th	1:33.1	2.0	Kenichi Ikezoe	Sodashi
May 9	Tokyo	NHK Mile Cup	1	1,600 m (Firm)	18	10	16.9 (7)	2nd	1:31.6	0.0	Kenichi Ikezoe	Schnell Meister
Aug 15	Niigata	Sekiya Kinen	3	1,600 m (Firm)	17	11	1.8 (1)	3rd	1:32.0	0.2	Kenichi Ikezoe	Lotus Land
Oct 23	Tokyo	Fuji Stakes	2	1,600 m (Firm)	17	1	3.9 (1)	1st	1:33.2	0.0	Kenichi Ikezoe	(Satono Wizard)
Dec 25	Hanshin	Hanshin Cup	2	1,400 m (Firm)	18	17	4.1 (1)	15th	1:21.5	1.2	Kenichi Ikezoe	Grenadier Guards
2022 – four-year-old season
Feb 26	King Abdulaziz	1351 Turf Sprint	3	1,351 m (Firm)	14	14	5/1 (2)	1st	1:18.0	0.0	Christophe Lemaire	(Casa Creed)
May 15	Tokyo	Victoria Mile	1	1,600 m (Firm)	18	2	5.4 (2)	5th	1:32.5	0.3	Kenichi Ikezoe	Sodashi
Jun 5	Tokyo	Yasuda Kinen	1	1,600 m (Firm)	18	13	8.2 (4)	1st	1:32.3	0.0	Kenichi Ikezoe	(Schnell Meister)
Sep 11	Chukyo	Centaur Stakes	2	1,200 m (Firm)	13	11	3.2 (2)	5th	1:06.9	0.7	Christophe Lemaire	Meikei Yell
2023 – five-year-old season
Feb 25	King Abdulaziz	1351 Turf Sprint	3	1,351 m (Firm)	11	11	15/8 (1)	10th	1:19.0	1.5	Christophe Lemaire	Bathrat Leon
May 14	Tokyo	Victoria Mile	1	1,600 m (Firm)	16	6	7.6 (4)	1st	1:32.2	0.0	Keita Tosaki	(Sodashi)
Jun 4	Tokyo	Yasuda Kinen	1	1,600 m (Firm)	18	18	7.4 (4)	1st	1:31.4	–0.2	Keita Tosaki	(Serifos)
Oct 8	Tokyo	Mainichi Okan	2	1,800 m (Firm)	12	10	2.0 (1)	2nd	1:45.3	0.0	Keita Tosaki	Elton Barows
Nov 4	Santa Anita	Breeders' Cup Mile	1	1 mile (Firm)	13	10	2.5 (1)	5th	1:32.8	0.3	Keita Tosaki	Master of The Seas

Legend:
Turf

== Pedigree ==
Pedigree of Songline (JPN), brown mare, 2018
Sire Kizuna (JPN) 2010	Deep Impact (JPN); 2002	Sunday Silence (USA)	Halo
Sire Kizuna (JPN) 2010	Deep Impact (JPN); 2002	Sunday Silence (USA)	Wishing Well
Sire Kizuna (JPN) 2010	Deep Impact (JPN); 2002	Wind in Her Hair (IRE)	Alzao (USA)
Sire Kizuna (JPN) 2010	Deep Impact (JPN); 2002	Wind in Her Hair (IRE)	Burghclere (GB)
Sire Kizuna (JPN) 2010	Catequil (CAN); 1990	Storm Cat (USA)	Storm Bird (CAN)
Sire Kizuna (JPN) 2010	Catequil (CAN); 1990	Storm Cat (USA)	Terlingua
Sire Kizuna (JPN) 2010	Catequil (CAN); 1990	Pacific Princess (USA)	Damascus (USA)
Sire Kizuna (JPN) 2010	Catequil (CAN); 1990	Pacific Princess (USA)	Fiji (GB)
Dam Luminous Parade (JPN) 2011	Symboli Kris S (USA); 1999	Kris S	Roberto
Dam Luminous Parade (JPN) 2011	Symboli Kris S (USA); 1999	Kris S	Sharp Queen
Dam Luminous Parade (JPN) 2011	Symboli Kris S (USA); 1999	Tee Kay	Gold Meridain
Dam Luminous Parade (JPN) 2011	Symboli Kris S (USA); 1999	Tee Kay	Tri Argo
Dam Luminous Parade (JPN) 2011	Luminous Point (USA); 2003	Agnes Tachyon	Sunday Silence (USA)
Dam Luminous Parade (JPN) 2011	Luminous Point (USA); 2003	Agnes Tachyon	Agnes Flora
Dam Luminous Parade (JPN) 2011	Luminous Point (USA); 2003	Soninke (GB)	Machiavellian (USA)
Dam Luminous Parade (JPN) 2011	Luminous Point (USA); 2003	Soninke (GB)	Sonic Lady (USA) (Half-bred Family: B3)

- Songline was inbred 3 × 4 to Sunday Silence, meaning that this stallion appears in both the third and fourth generations of her pedigree.
