= Salios =

Japanese Thoroughbred racehorse

Salios; サリオス
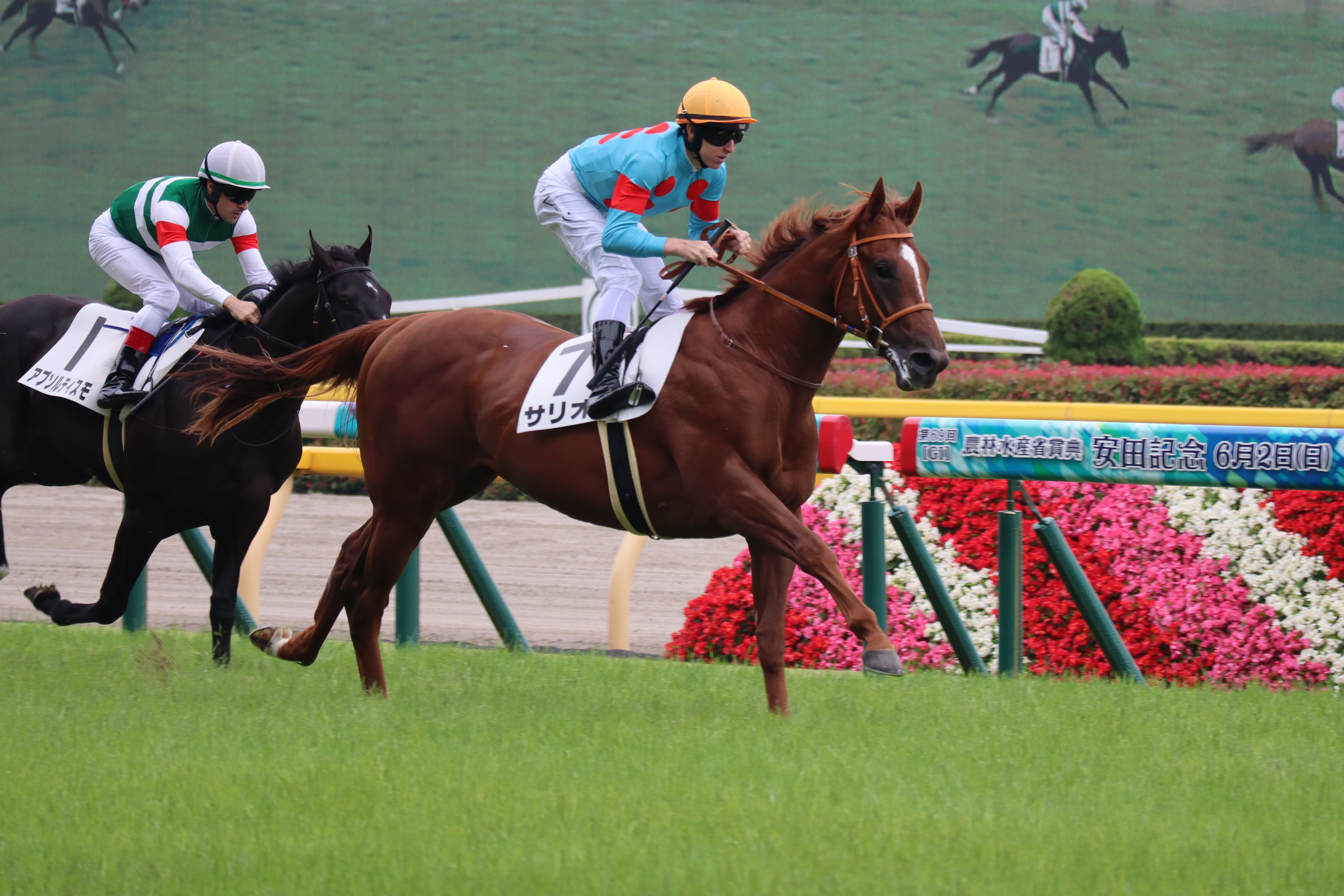
- Salios winning his first race in June 2019
- Sire: Heart's Cry
- Grandsire: Sunday Silence
- Dam: Salomina
- Damsire: Lomitas
- Sex: Stallion
- Foaled: 23 January 2017
- Country: Japan
- Colour: Chestnut
- Breeder: Northern Farm
- Owner: Silk Racing
- Racing colours
- Trainer: Noriyuki Hori
- Jockey: Damian Lane; Ryan Moore
- Record: 15: 5-2-2
- Earnings: ¥492,177,100; JRA: ¥457,631,000; Overseas: ¥34,546,100

Major wins
- Saudi Arabia Royal Cup (2019); Asahi Hai Futurity Stakes (2019); Mainichi Okan (2020, 2022)

Salios (Japanese: サリオス, foaled 23 January 2017) is a Japanese Thoroughbred racehorse. He was one of the leading juvenile colt in Japan in 2019 when he was undefeated in three races including the Saudi Arabia Royal Cup and the Asahi Hai Futurity Stakes. In the following year, he won the Mainichi Okan and finished second in both the Satsuki Sho and the Tokyo Yushun.

== Background ==
Salios is a chestnut horse with a narrow white blaze bred in Japan by Northern Farm. He was sent into training with Noriyuki Hori and carries the colours of the Northern Farm associate Silk Racing. He is a large Thoroughbred, weighing over 530 kg.

He was from the tenth crop of foals sired by Heart's Cry, a horse whose wins included the Arima Kinen and the Dubai Sheema Classic. Heart's Cry's other foals have included Suave Richard, Admire Rakti, Just A Way, Do Deuce, and Lys Gracieux. Salios's dam Salomina was a German-bred mare who showed top-class form in her native country, winning the Preis der Diana in 2012 before being exported to Japan. Salomina's dam Saldentigerin won the Group 3 Baden-Württemberg-Trophy and was a female-line descendant of the German broodmare Suleika (foaled 1954), making her a relative of Slip Anchor, Buena Vista and Manhattan Cafe.

== Racing career ==
=== 2019: two-year-old season ===
Salios made his debut in an event for previously unraced juveniles over 1600 metres at Tokyo Racecourse on 2 June and won from Absolutismo in an eight-runner race. After a break of four months, the colt returned to the track and was stepped up in class to contest the Grade 3 Saudi Arabia Royal Cup at Tokyo Racecourse on 5 October when he was ridden by Shu Ishibashi and started the 0.5/1 favourite against eight opponents. He raced in third place before moving up to dispute the lead in the straight and got the better of the filly Cravache d'Or to win by one and a quarter length in a race record time of 1:32.7 for 1600 metres.

On 15 December Salios was partnered by Ryan Moore when he started favourite for the Grade 1 Asahi Hai Futurity Stakes at Hanshin Racecourse. His fifteen opponents included Taisei Vision (winner of the Keio Hai Nisai Stakes), Red Bel Jour (Daily Hai Nisai Stakes), Bien Fait (Hakodate Nisai Stakes) and Meiner Grit (Kokura Nisai Stakes). After racing in third place behind Bien Fait and Meisho Titan he went to the front early in the straight and steadily increased his lead to win by two and a half lengths from Taisei Vision. His winning time of 1:33.0 was a new record for the race, beating the mark of 1:33.3 set by Danon Premium in 2017. Ryan Moore commented "He was a lovely horse... he was still very green on the turn so he should run even faster in the future. He's a big powerful colt and when I sat on him you get the impression that he's very strong already, but he should improve and be even better as he gets older being the size that he is and hopefully he’ll carry on".

In January 2020, at the JRA Awards for 2019, Salios finished runner-up in the poll for Best Two-Year-Old Colt, losing to Contrail by 77 votes to 197. In the official Japanese rankings however, Salios was rated the best two-year-old of 2019, one pound ahead of Contrail.

=== 2020: three-year-old season ===
On his first run of 2020 Salios faced Contrail in a "much-anticipated showdown" for the Satsuki Sho over 1200 at Nakayama Racecourse and went off the 2.8/1 third choice in the betting. Ridden by the Australian jockey Damian Lane he raced up the inside before taking the lead in the straight but came of second best in a sustained struggle with Contrail, beaten half a length. Noriyuki Hori later said, "It was a difficult race last time, and he didn't change leads in the homestraight, as well as not getting the best ground, making things tough for him". Lane was again in the saddle when Salios was moved up in distance and started 3.4/1 second favourite behind Contrail for the Tokyo Yushun over 2400 metres at Tokyo. After being restrained in mid-division he was forced to race on the wide outside to obtain racing room and finished strongly but was never able to get on terms with Contrail and finished second, beaten three lengths by the winner.

After the summer break Salios returned to the track on 11 October when he was matched against older horses for the first time in the Grade 2 Mainichi Okan over 1800 metres at Tokyo. Ridden by Christophe Lemaire he started the odds-on favourite in an eleven-runner field which included Satono Impresa (Mainichi Hai), Daiwa Cagney (Epsom Cup), Contra Check (Turquoise Stakes) and Cadenas (Yayoi Sho). After racing in fourth place for most of the way, Salios took the lead in the straight and drew away to win by three lengths from Daiwa Cagney. In the Grade 1 Mile Championship over 1600 metres at Hanshin on 22 November was ridden by Mirco Demuro and went off the 3.1/1 second choice in a seventeen-runner field. He was restrained towards the rear before producing a strong late run but never looked likely to win and came home fifth behind Gran Alegria.

In the 2020 World's Best Racehorse Rankings, Salios was rated on 119, making him the equal 57th best racehorse in the world.

=== 2021: four-year-old season ===
In four and half months into the new season, Salios competed in the Osaka Hai. Kohei Matsuyama who took the reign this time, started well in the beginning and positioned the horse well in third places. They tried to break the pack on the inside of the track but ran out of steam in doing so, finishing fifth. The next race he joined would be the Yasuda Kinen. In this race, he hugged the rail at the back of the race and tried to accelerate at 200 metres mark but the timing was off due to the incoming traffic. He finished in eighth place this time, the first time he dropped out from top five finishes.

He had a rest in the summer with the preparation set up for the Mile Championship in November. Still stuck with Matsuyama, he began his race with a good start and ran in third place for awhile. His run was weakened on the final 100 metres in which he was overtook by several horses and crossed the line as the sixth best horse in the end. In December, he competed in his first overseas races, the Hong Kong Mile. He was back with Damian Lane on this first overseas' journey. He would compete with horses like Indy Champ, Danon Kingly and Golden Sixty who was on the record 15-win streaks at that time. When the gates opened, Salios who started from the inside gate took an early lead on the third corner. He held up his pace well on the final straight but surpassed by surging Golden Sixty and More Than This to finish third that day.

=== 2022: five-year-old season ===
The team decided to put his season debut this time on a sprint race in Takamatsunomiya Kinen, a 1200 metres race at Chukyo. This decision did not bear well in the end as he struggled on the final straight and placed 15th, point six seconds behind the winner, Naran Huleg. On June 5, he tried again for the Yasuda Kinen at Tokyo. Salios who was again under Lane control, took a wide trip around seventh just in front of the eventual winner, responded well to rally for the lead but weakened in the last 100 meters and gave way to Songline and then the fast-closing Schnell Meister in the last strides for third.

He took a break for four months before racing in the Mainichi Okan, two years after his win in that same competition. This time, Kohei Matsuyama back at it again as his jockey. When the race began, Danon The Kid who was started beside him crashed the gate at the start but Salios stayed unfazed. He stayed in the middle of the pack, breaking away from the pack in the straight and showing his finishing speed, winning by half a length over second-place finisher Justin Cafe. He became the first horse to win the Mainichi Okan twice since Oguri Cap back in 1988 and 1989 editions. He ran in the Mile Championship next but not showing a good leg finishes after positioned in 11th for the majority of the race threw him to the back and ended up in 14th-place. For his retirement race, He was scheduled for the Hong Kong Mile but it was cancelled after he was found to have a left foreleg lameness on December 10, the day before the race. He was retired alongside his teammate, Glory Vase and being assigned to a stud duty at Shadai Stallion Station in Abira, Hokkaido.

== Racing form ==
Salios won five races and placed in another four out of 15 starts. The data available below is based on JBIS, netkeiba and HKJC.

Date	Track	Race	Grade	Distance (Condition)	Entry	HN	Odds (Favored)	Finish	Time	Margins	Jockey	Winner (Runner-up)
2019 – two-year-old season
Jun 2	Tokyo	2yo Newcomer		1,600 m (Firm)	8	7	3.2 (2)	1st	1:37.1	–0.3	Damian Lane	(Absolutismo)
Oct 5	Tokyo	Saudi Arabia Royal Cup	3	1,600 m (Firm)	9	3	1.5 (1)	1st	R1:32.7	–0.2	Shu Ishibashi	(Cravache d'Or)
Dec 15	Hanshin	Asahi Hai Futurity Stakes	1	1,600 m (Firm)	16	6	2.0 (1)	1st	1:33.0	–0.4	Ryan Moore	(Taisei Vision)
2020 – three-year-old season
Apr 19	Nakayama	Satsuki Sho	1	2,000 m (Good)	18	7	3.8 (3)	2nd	2:00.8	0.1	Damian Lane	Contrail
May 31	Tokyo	Tokyo Yushun	1	2,400 m (Firm)	18	12	4.4 (2)	2nd	2:24.6	0.5	Damian Lane	Contrail
Oct 11	Tokyo	Mainichi Okan	2	1,800 m (Good)	11	9	1.3 (1)	1st	1:45.5	–0.5	Christophe Lemaire	(Daiwa Cagney)
Nov 22	Hanshin	Mile Championship	1	1,600 m (Firm)	17	17	4.1 (2)	5th	1:32.4	0.4	Mirco Demuro	Gran Alegria
2021 – four-year-old season
Apr 4	Hanshin	Osaka Hai	1	2,000 m (Soft)	13	2	5.8 (3)	5th	2:02.7	1.1	Kohei Matsuyama	Lei Papale
Jun 6	Tokyo	Yasuda Kinen	1	1,600 m (Firm)	14	1	7.9 (3)	8th	1:32.4	0.7	Kohei Matsuyama	Danon Kingly
Nov 21	Hanshin	Mile Championship	1	1,600 m (Firm)	16	4	9.5 (3)	6th	1:33.1	0.5	Kohei Matsuyama	Gran Alegria
Dec 12	Sha Tin	Hong Kong Mile	1	1,600 m (Firm)	11	6	8.8 (3)	3rd	1:34.2	0.3	Damian Lane	Golden Sixty
2022 – five-year-old season
Mar 22	Chukyo	Takamatsunomiya Kinen	1	1,200 m (Soft)	18	1	10.7 (4)	15th	1:08.9	0.6	Shu Ishibashi	Naran Huleg
Jun 5	Tokyo	Yasuda Kinen	1	1,600 m (Firm)	18	17	15.7 (8)	3rd	1:32.3	0.0	Damian Lane	Songline
Oct 9	Tokyo	Mainichi Okan	2	1,800 m (Firm)	10	3	3.0 (1)	1st	R1:44.1	–0.1	Kohei Matsuyama	(Justin Cafe)
Nov 20	Hanshin	Mile Championship	1	1,600 m (Firm)	17	5	6.2 (3)	14th	1:33.6	1.1	Ryan Moore	Serifos
Dec 11	Sha Tin	Hong Kong Mile	1	1,600 m (Firm)	10	3	–	Scratched	–	–	Ryan Moore	California Spangle

Legend:
Turf

- R indicated that the finish was a record time.

== Pedigree ==
Pedigree of Salios (JPN), chestnut colt, 2017
Sire Heart's Cry (JPN) 2001	Sunday Silence (USA); 1986	Halo	Hail to Reason
Sire Heart's Cry (JPN) 2001	Sunday Silence (USA); 1986	Halo	Cosmah
Sire Heart's Cry (JPN) 2001	Sunday Silence (USA); 1986	Wishing Well	Understanding
Sire Heart's Cry (JPN) 2001	Sunday Silence (USA); 1986	Wishing Well	Mountain Flower
Sire Heart's Cry (JPN) 2001	Irish Dance (JPN); 1990	Tony Bin (IRE)	Kampala (GB)
Sire Heart's Cry (JPN) 2001	Irish Dance (JPN); 1990	Tony Bin (IRE)	Severn Bridge (GB)
Sire Heart's Cry (JPN) 2001	Irish Dance (JPN); 1990	Buper Dance (USA)	Lyphard
Sire Heart's Cry (JPN) 2001	Irish Dance (JPN); 1990	Buper Dance (USA)	My Bupers
Dam Salomina (GER) 2009	Lomitas (GB); 1988	Niniski (USA)	Nijinsky (CAN)
Dam Salomina (GER) 2009	Lomitas (GB); 1988	Niniski (USA)	Virginia Hils
Dam Salomina (GER) 2009	Lomitas (GB); 1988	La Colorada (GER)	Surumu
Dam Salomina (GER) 2009	Lomitas (GB); 1988	La Colorada (GER)	La Dorada (IRE)
Dam Salomina (GER) 2009	Saldentigerin (GER); 2001	Tiger Hill (IRE)	Danehill (USA)
Dam Salomina (GER) 2009	Saldentigerin (GER); 2001	Tiger Hill (IRE)	The Filly (GER)
Dam Salomina (GER) 2009	Saldentigerin (GER); 2001	Salde	Alkalde
Dam Salomina (GER) 2009	Saldentigerin (GER); 2001	Salde	Saite (Family: 16-c)
