= Yuichi Kitamura =

Japanese jockey (born 1986)

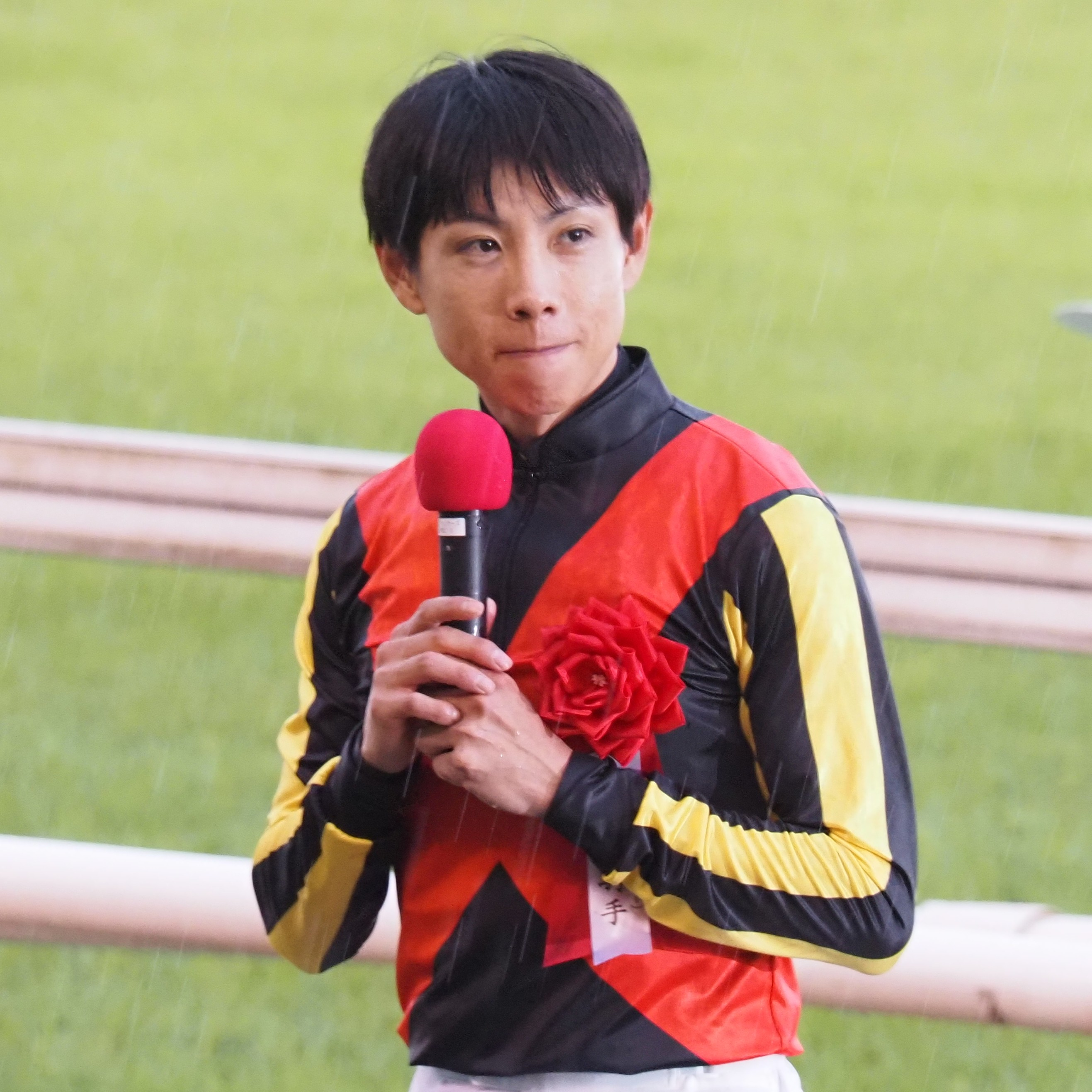
- Kitamura after winning the 2025 Tōkyō Yūshun

Personal information
- Born: October 3, 1986 (age 39) Shiga Prefecture, Japan
- Height: 164 cm (5 ft 5 in)
- Weight: 51 kg (112 lb)

Horse racing career
- Sport: Horse racing

Significant horses
- Al Ain, Chrono Genesis, Resistencia, Croix du Nord

Yuichi Kitamura (Japanese: 北村友一; born October 3, 1986) is a Japanese jockey of the JRA.

== Career ==
After graduating the Horse Racing School in 2006 he made his debut as a jockey that same year. During that year, he won 14 races, earning him the Chuo Keiba Kansai Hoso Kisha Club Award.

On October 4, 2008, Kitamura won his 100th race, the 88th jockey to do so in JRA history. That same year, he won his first graded race when he won the Daily Hai Nisai Stakes with Schon Wald.

On August 19, 2012, Kitamura won his 300th JRA win at a maiden race at Kokura Racecourse with Oken Ichigeki. Having achieved the milestone at Kokura, as well as winning the Kitakyushu Kinen during that meeting, he would be awarded the Kokura Turf Award. He would later win the same award in 2018.

On November 2, 2013, Kitamura was given a 9-day suspension (4 race days) lasting from November 9 to 17 after swerving in to and cutting off another horse in a race at Kyoto Racecourse. When he was given the suspension at the stewards' room, he responded by knocking down a desk, resulting him being given an additional 7-day suspension (2 race days) for disruptive behavior.

On February 12, 2017, Kitamura became the 34th JRA jockey to achieve his 500th JRA victory when he won an allowance race held at Kokura Racecourse with Press Attention.

In 2018, Kitamura won his first JpnI race when he won the Zen-Nippon Nisai Yushun with Nova Lenda. The following year, Kitamura won his first Grade I race when he won the Ōsaka Hai with Al Ain. Kitamura would go on to win two more Grade I races that same year; the Shūka Sho with Chrono Genesis, and the Hanshin Juvenile Fillies with Resistencia.

In 2020, Kitamura, together with Chrono Genesis, won both Grand Prix races in the same year; the Takarazuka Kinen and Arima Kinen.

On May 2, 2021, while riding in a maiden race at Hanshin Racecourse, another horse swerved in to Kitamura on the back stretch, causing the horse to trip and for Kitamura to fall over. This resulted in multiple bone fractures, including at least 8 broken vertebrae and another broken scapula; forcing him to go in to rehabilitation for a year.

Kitamura returned to horse racing on June 11, 2022, and won his first race since his fall when he won the Hananomichi Stakes with Over Nexus.

In 2024, Kitamura won his first Grade I race in four years when he won the Hopeful Stakes with Croix du Nord, who shares the same owner (Sunday Racing) and trainer (Takashi Saito) with Chrono Genesis. Both Kitamura and Croix du Nord would later go on to win the next year's Tōkyō Yūshun, as well as the Prix du Prince d'Orange; which would be Kitamura's first graded race abroad.

On February 21, 2026, Kitamura won his 1000th JRA race win when he won an allowance race while riding Zakkuzaku in the Hanshin Racecourse, becoming the 44th jockey in JRA history to do so.

== Major wins ==
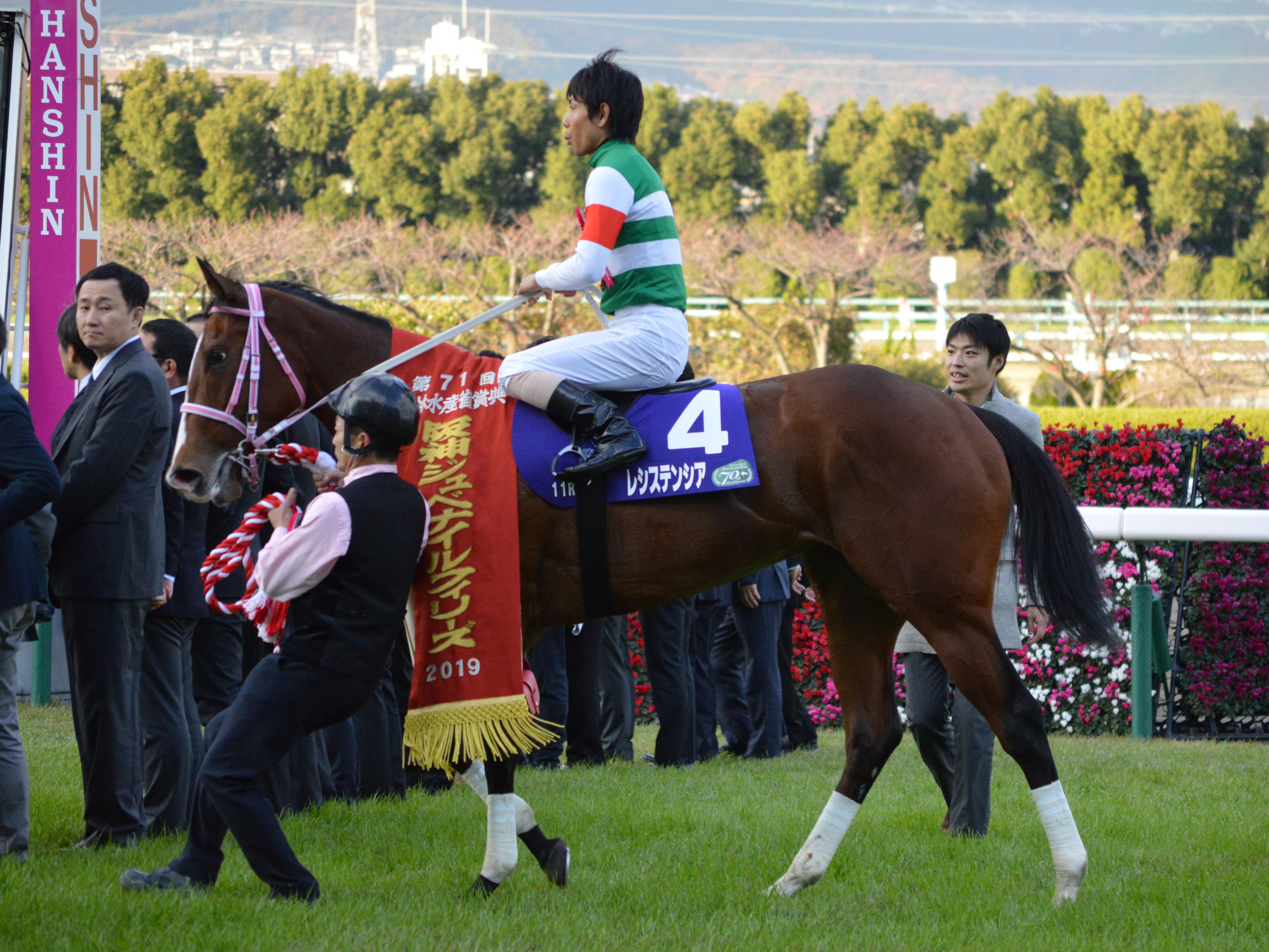
Kitamura and Resistencia at the 2019 Hanshin Juvenile Fillies

- Arima Kinen – (1) – Chrono Genesis (2020)
- Hanshin Juvenile Fillies – (1) – Resistencia (2019)
- Hopeful Stakes – (1) – Croix du Nord (2024)
- Japan Breeding Farms' Cup Ladies' Classic – (1) – Fashionista (2020)
- Ōsaka Hai – (2) – Al Ain (2019), Croix du Nord (2026)
- Shūka Sho – (1) – Chrono Genesis (2019)
- Takarazuka Kinen – (1) – Chrono Genesis (2020)
- Tennō Shō (Spring) – (1) – Croix du Nord (2026)
- Tōkyō Yūshun – (1) – Croix du Nord (2025)

== Personal life ==
In January 2021, Kitamura married a 29-year-old woman from Shimane Prefecture. The two gave birth to a daughter in 2022.

== Trivia ==
In the years since his 2013 suspension, horse racing fans have unofficially nicknamed Kitamura "desk (Japanese: 机)" after the incident, as well as the fact that there is already a "Yuichi" and "Kitamura" in the same field. The nickname has been acknowledged by Kitamura in an interview with him and fellow jockey Yusuke Fujioka on netkeiba.com, and later in an appearance in Junk SPORTS, a sports-themed talk show on Fuji Television.
