= Centaur Stakes =

Centaur Stakes セントウルステークス
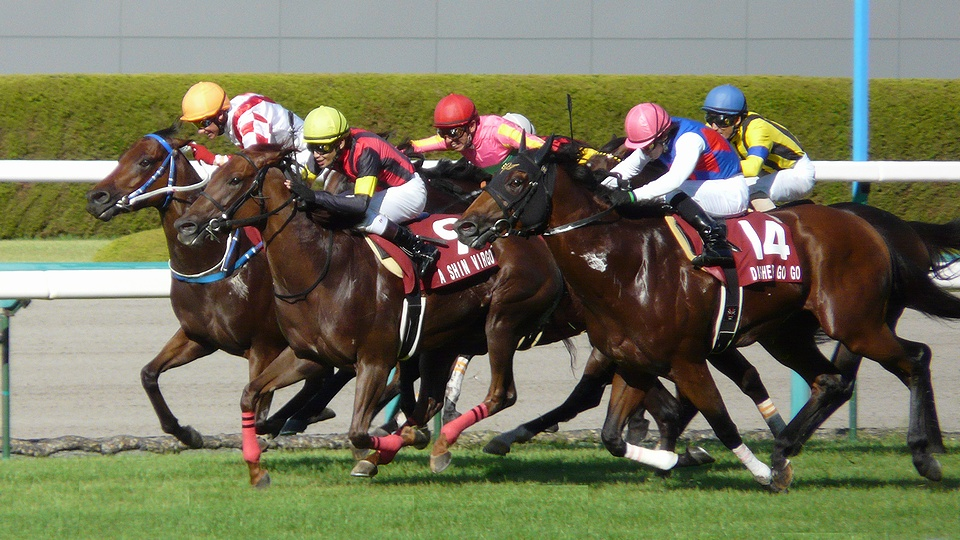
- The 25th (2011) Centaur Stakes
- Class: Grade 2
- Location: Hanshin Racecourse
- Inaugurated: 1987
- Race type: Thoroughbred
- Website: japanracing.jp - Centaur Stakes & Sprinters Stakes

Race information
- Distance: 1200 meters (About 6 furlongs)
- Surface: Turf
- Track: Right-handed (inner course)
- Qualification: 3-y-o & Up, Thoroughbreds
- Weight: Special Weight
- Purse: ¥ 128,140,000 (as of 2024): 1st: ¥ 59,000,000; 2nd: ¥ 24,000,000; 3rd: ¥ 15,000,000

The Centaur Stakes (セントウルステークス, Sentouru Sutekusu) is a Grade 2 flat horse race in Japan for three-year-old and above thoroughbreds run over a distance of 1,200 metres (approximately 6 furlongs) at Hanshin Racecourse in September.

It was first run in 1987 and takes its name from a statue at the racecourse in the form of centaur, a creature from Greek mythology with the upper body of a human and the lower body and legs of a horse.

Prior to 2000 the race was run over a distance of 1,400 metres (7 furlongs), and having originally been classed as a Domestic Grade 3 race, it was promoted to Domestic Grade 2 status in 2006 and was promoted to International Grade 2 status in 2007.

From 2005 to 2010 it was a leg of the Global Sprint Challenge series. It has now been replaced as a Japanese leg of the series by the Takamatsunomiya Kinen.

== Weight ==
55 kg for three-year-olds, 57 kg for four-year-olds and above.

Allowances:

- 2 kg for fillies / mares
- 1 kg for southern hemisphere bred three-year-olds

Penalties (excluding two-year-old race performance):

- If a graded stakes race has been won within a year:
  - 2 kg for a grade 1 win (1 kg for fillies / mares)
  - 1 kg for a grade 2 win
- If a graded stakes race has been won for more than a year:
  - 1 kg for a grade 1 win

== Winners ==
Year	Winner	Age	Jockey	Trainer	Owner	Time
1987	Mr Boy	5	Hiroshi Kawachi	Tadashi Nakao	Iwao Obara	1:22.5
1988	Sankin Hayate	4	Hiroshi Kawachi	Kōjirō Hashiguchi	Sakino Kawahara	1:21.7
1989	Hoei Sovereign	5	Yoshiyuki Muramoto	Tetsuya Meno	Suetsugu Kitagawa	1:20.9
1990	Eiko Caesar	5	Nobuyuki Tajima	Isao Yasuda	Ken'ichi Ikeuchi	1:08.5
1991	Nifty Niece	4	Keiji Takehara	Yasuhisa Matsuyama	Zenya Yoshida	1:07.9
1992	My Superman	6	Katsumi Minai	Yukiharu Shikato	Goichi Sugawara	1:07.6
1993	Elizabeth Rose	4	Hiroshi Kawachi	Sakae Watanabe	Katsumi Yoshida	1:22.1
1994	Eishin Washington	3	Shigefumi Kumazawa	Shigeharu Naitō	Toyomitsu Hirai	1:08.7
1995	Biko Pegasus	4	Yutaka Take	Tsugio Yanagida	Legend	1:21.2
1996	Fujino Makken O	5	Yutaka Take	Yoshio Nakamura	Hirotoshi Nakamura	1:21.0
1997	Osumi Tycoon	6	Kōshirō Take	Kunihiko Take	Hidenori Yamaji	1:21.0
1998	Meiner Love	3	Yutaka Take	Ryūichi Inaba	Thoroughbred Club Ruffian	1:21.3
1999	Eishin Guymon	6	Jun'ichi Serizawa	Tadashi Kayō	Toyomitsu Hirai	1:20.7
2000	Behind the Mask	4	Yūichi Fukunaga	Shūji Kitahashi	Sunday Racing Co; Ltd.	1:07.6
2001	Tennessee Girl	4	Kazuhiro Yamada	Masanao Tsubo	Toyomitsu Hirai	1:08.1
2002	Believe	4	Yasunari Iwata	Shigeki Matsumoto	Kōji Maeda	1:07.1
2003	Tenshino Kiseki	5	Norihiro Yokoyama	Kōjirō Hashiguchi	Masuo Sugitani	1:07.8
2004	Golden Cast	4	Yutaka Take	Kōjirō Hashiguchi	Kōji Maeda	1:08.2
2005	Golden Cast	5	Futoshi Komaki	Kōjirō Hashiguchi	Kōji Maeda	1:08.3
2006 (Note: The race took place at Chukyo Racecourse)	She Is Tosho	6	Kenichi Ikezoe	Akio Tsurudome	Tōshō Sangyō Corporation	1:08.6
2007	Sans Adieu	5	Yuga Kawada	Hidetaka Otonashi	Takao Matuoka	1:07.1
2008	Kanoya Zakura	4	Futoshi Komaki	Kōjirō Hashiguchi	Kaoru Kanda	1:07.3
2009	Ultima Thule	5	Masami Matsuoka	Masashi Okuhira	Shadai Race Horse	1:07.8
2010	Dasher Go Go	3	Yūga Kawada	Takayuki Yasuda	Shin Ashida	1:08.0
2011	A Shin Virgo	4	Hironobu Tanabe	Ken Kozaki	Eishindō Co Ltd	1:08.5
2012	Epice Arome	3	Yutaka Take	Sei Ishizaka	Katsumi Yoshida	1:07.3
2013	Hakusan Moon	3	Manabu Sakai	Masato Nishizono	Goichi Kawasaki	1:07.5
2014	Little Gerda	5	Kyosuke Maruta	Ippo Sameshima	Yoshiko Kuriyama	1:07.4
2015	Active Minoru	3	Kota Fujioka	Yoshihito Kitade	Minoru Yoshioka	1:07.8
2016	Big Arthur	5	Yuichi Fukunaga	Kenichi Fujioka	Akira Nakatsuji	1:07.6
2017	Fine Needle	4	Mirco Demuro	Yoshitada Takahashi	Godolphin	1:07.5
2018	Fine Needle	5	Yuga Kawada	Yoshitada Takahashi	Godolphin	1:08.8
2019	Tower of London	4	Christophe Lemaire	Kazuo Fujisawa	Godolphin	1:06.7
2020	Danon Smash	5	Kousei Miura	Takayuki Yasuda	Danox Co Ltd	1:07.9
2021	Resistencia	4	Christophe Lemaire	Takeshi Matsushita	Carrot Farm	1:07.2
2022	Meikei Yell	4	Kenichi Ikezoe	Hidenori Take	Nagoya Keiba Co Ltd	1:06.2
2023	T M Spada	4	Akatsuki Tomita	Kazuyoshi Kihara	Masatsugu Takezono	1:07.2
2024	Toshin Macau	5	Akira Sugawara	Mizuki Takayanagi	Sato Co. Ltd.	1:07.7
2025	Kangchenjunga	5	Yuga Kawada	Yasushi Shono	Masanobu Habata	1:07.4
2026	Flicker Jab	4	Kohei Matsuyama	Shota Nishizono	West.Forest.Stable Co. Ltd.	1:06.9

== See also ==
- Horse racing in Japan
- List of Japanese flat horse races
