= Lei Papale =

Japanese Thoroughbred racehorse

Lei Papale レイパパレ
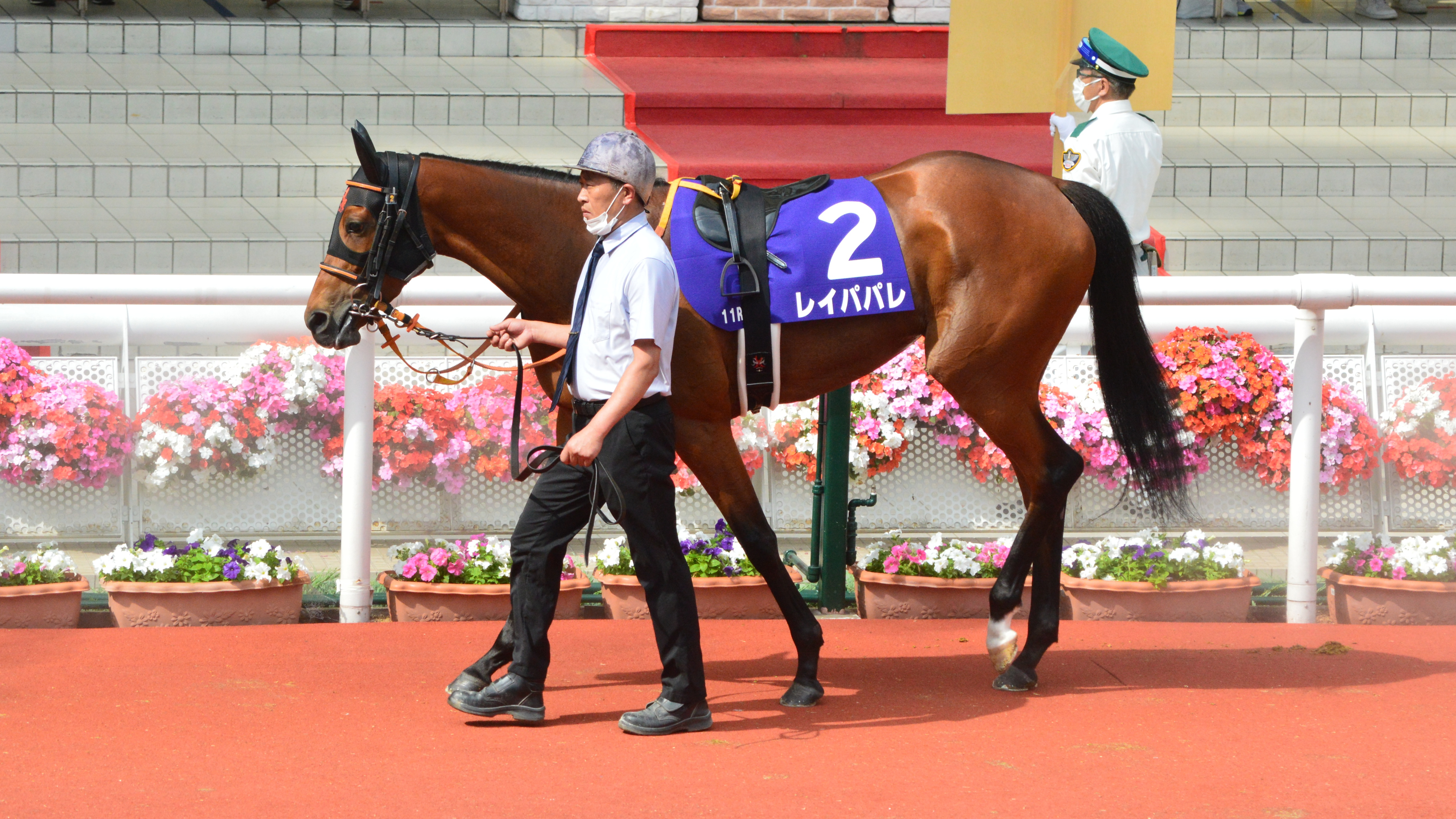
- Lei Papale at the Takarazuka Kinen (2021)
- Breed: Thoroughbred
- Sire: Deep Impact
- Grandsire: Sunday Silence
- Dam: Shells Lei
- Damsire: Kurofune
- Sex: Mare
- Foaled: 28 January 2017
- Country: Japan
- Colour: Bay
- Breeder: Northern Farm
- Owner: U Carrot Farm
- Racing colours
- Trainer: Tomokazu Takano
- Jockey: Yuga Kawada
- Record: 15: 6-2-1
- Earnings: ¥393,147,000

Major wins
- Challenge Cup (2020); Osaka Hai (2021)

Lei Papale (Japanese: レイパパレ, Hepburn: Rei Papare; foaled 28 January 2017) is a Japanese Thoroughbred racehorse. She did not race as a juvenile, but as a three-year-old in 2020 she was unbeaten in five starts including the Grade 3 Challenge Cup. On her first run of 2021 she took the Grade 1 Osaka Hai.

== Background ==
Lei Papale is a "lightly built" bay mare bred in Japan by Northern Farm. She was sent into training with Tomokazu Takano and raced in the green, white and red colours of the Northern Farm affiliate U Carrot Farm. She usually races in a hood.

She was from the ninth crop of foals sired by Deep Impact, who was the Japanese Horse of the Year in 2005 and 2006, winning races including the Tokyo Yushun, Tenno Sho, Arima Kinen and Japan Cup. Deep Impact's other progeny include Gentildonna, Harp Star, Kizuna, A Shin Hikari, Marialite and Saxon Warrior. Lei Papale's dam Shells Lei won three of her twenty-one starts, finished second in both the Tulip Sho and Rose Stakes and ran fifth in the Oka Sho and the Shuka Sho. As a broodmare she had previously produced the Hopeful Stakes winner Shining Lei. She was one of numerous notable Japanese horses descended from the imported British broodmare Florries Cup.

== Racing career ==
=== 2020: three-year-old season ===
Lei Papale was ridden in all of her 2020 races by Yuga Kawada. She made her first appearance in a 1600-metre race for previously unraced three-year-olds on firm ground at Kyoto Racecourse on 11 January when she started the 1.7/1 favourite and won by two lengths from White Lodge. After an absence of almost five months, the filly returned for a minor race over 1600 metres at Hanshin Racecourse on 6 June and won by a length from Oh My Darling. In July she was stepped up in distance and won again, coming home two lengths clear of the four-year-old Cantor in the Itoigawa Tokubetsu over 1800 metres at Niigata Racecourse.

On 18 October Lei Papale began her autumn campaign in the Ohara Stakes, an 1800 metres handicap at Kyoto and started the 0.9/1 favourite in a thirteen-runner field. Carrying 52 kg she led from the start and came home two lengths clear of Satono Wizard. For her final run of the year the filly was stepped up in class and distance for the Grade 3 Challenge Cup over 2000 metres at Hanshin and started the 0.6/1 favourite against ten opponents including Bravas (winner of the Niigata Kinen), Lord Quest (Swan Stakes) and Generale Uno (St Lite Kinen). After tracking the front-running Generale Uno, Lei Papale took the lead entering the straight and won by one and a half lengths from Bravas. Tomokazu Takano later commented "It was her first try at graded level... as well as the distance of 2,000 meters with four corners in the race, but she passed that test well".

=== 2021: four-year-old season ===
For her first appearance as a four-year-old Lei Papale was stepped up to the highest class to contest the Grade 1 Osaka Hai over 2000 metres at Hanshin on 4 April. In the build-up to the race, Takano said "She's a horse with a lot of power and potential. It's important that she runs with a good rhythm, even though I think she can race from any position. She comes to the race fresh... I'm very excited to see what she can achieve". With Kawada in the saddle, she started the 11.2/1 fourth choice in the betting behind Contrail, Gran Alegria and Salios in a thirteen-runner field which also included Wagnerian, Persian Knight (Mile Championship), Bravas and Mozu Bello (Nikkei Shinshun Hai). Lei Papale set the pace from the start, switched left to race down the centre of the track in the straight and drew away in the closing stages to win by four lengths from Contrail. Kawada commented "I had always believed in her outstanding talent since her debut... she was able to jump into her rhythm throughout the race without being pressed... And to still have the strength to find another gear over the turf condition today—she is an exceptional filly to keep her speed right to the end." She became the first horse in JRA history to have won a GI race with only 6 undefeated races to his or her belt.

Lei Papale's winning streak stopped there as she finished third at her next race, the 2021 Takarazuka Kinen, behind Chrono Genesis and Unicorn Lion. After taking the summer off, she was entered into the All Comers but finished fourth behind Win Marilyn. She would then go on to race in the Queen Elizabeth II Cup and the Hong Kong Cup, but lost both races.

=== 2022: five-year-old season ===
Lei Papale's first race for 2022 was the Kinko Sho, where she placed herself fourth in the pack before running up the final stretch at a pace of 34.6 seconds for the last three furlongs but couldn't catch up to winner Jack d'Or and finished in 2nd place. The horse then entered the Osaka Hai in an attempt to win the same race for the second year in a row, but again finished in 2nd place, behind Potager, as her jockey said she might have been able to endure it better if the track had been dry.

After this, Lei Papale was unable to win any races, with her best showing being that year's Mainichi Okan, where she finished at 4th place behind Salios. After finishing at 9th place at the Hong Kong Cup, it was revealed that her front right leg was suffering from a bowed tendon, and that the horse would be retired to stand stud at Northern Farm.

== Racing form ==
Lei Papale won six races out of 15 starts. This data is available based on JBIS, netkeiba and HKJC.

Date	Track	Race	Grade	Distance (Condition)	Entry	HN	Odds (Favored)	Finish	Time	Margins	Jockey	Winner (Runner-up)
2020 – three-year-old season
Jan 11	Kyoto	3yo Newcomer		1,600 m (Firm)	16	4	2.7 (1)	1st	1:37.5	–0.3	Yuga Kawada	(White Lodge)
Jun 6	Hanshin	3yo Allowance	1W	1,600 m (Firm)	14	8	2.7 (1)	1st	1:33.9	–0.2	Yuga Kawada	(Oh My Darling)
Jul 26	Niigata	Itoigawa Tokubetsu	2W	1,800 m (Firm)	9	6	2.0 (1)	1st	1:45.3	–0.3	Yuga Kawada	(Cantor)
Oct 18	Kyoto	Ohara Stakes	3W	1,800 m (Good)	13	5	1.9 (1)	1st	1:46.3	–0.3	Yuga Kawada	(Satono Wizard)
Dec 5	Hanshin	Challenge Cup	3	2,000 m (Firm)	11	7	1.6 (1)	1st	1:59.9	–0.2	Yuga Kawada	(Bravas)
2021 – four-year-old season
Apr 4	Hanshin	Osaka Hai	1	2,000 m (Soft)	13	8	12.2 (4)	1st	2:01.6	–0.7	Yuga Kawada	(Mozu Bello)
Jun 27	Hanshin	Takarazuka Kinen	1	2,200 m (Firm)	13	2	3.5 (2)	3rd	2:11.4	0.5	Yuga Kawada	Chrono Genesis
Sep 26	Nakayama	Sankei Sho All Comers	2	2,200 m (Firm)	16	12	2.1 (1)	4th	2:12.3	0.4	Yuga Kawada	Win Marilyn
Nov 14	Hanshin	Queen Elizabeth II Cup	1	2,200 m (Firm)	17	1	2.9 (1)	6th	2:12.6	0.5	Christophe Lemaire	Akai Ito
Dec 12	Sha Tin	Hong Kong Cup	1	2,000 m (Firm)	12	11	5.1 (2)	6th	2:01.4	0.7	Christophe Soumillon	Loves Only You
2022 – five-year-old season
Mar 13	Chukyo	Kinko Sho	2	2,000 m (Firm)	13	10	5.6 (2)	2nd	1:57.6	0.4	Yuga Kawada	Jack d'Or
Apr 3	Hanshin	Osaka Hai	1	2,000 m (Firm)	16	14	9.2 (3)	2nd	1:58.5	0.1	Yuga Kawada	Potager
May 15	Tokyo	Victoria Mile	1	1,600 m (Firm)	18	13	4.1 (1)	12th	1:32.9	0.7	Yuga Kawada	Sodashi
Oct 9	Tokyo	Mainichi Okan	2	1,800 m (Firm)	10	5	4.7 (2)	4th	1:44.4	0.3	Yuga Kawada	Salios
Dec 11	Sha Tin	Hong Kong Cup	1	2,000 m (Good)	12	12	11.7 (5)	9th	2:01.3	1.6	Joao Moreira	Romantic Warrior

Legend:
Turf

== Pedigree ==
Pedigree of Lei Papale (JPN), bay filly, 2017
Sire Deep Impact (JPN) 2002	Sunday Silence (USA); 1986	Halo	Hail to Reason
Sire Deep Impact (JPN) 2002	Sunday Silence (USA); 1986	Halo	Cosmah
Sire Deep Impact (JPN) 2002	Sunday Silence (USA); 1986	Wishing Well	Understanding
Sire Deep Impact (JPN) 2002	Sunday Silence (USA); 1986	Wishing Well	Mountain Flower
Sire Deep Impact (JPN) 2002	Wind in Her Hair (IRE); 1991	Alzao (USA)	Lyphard
Sire Deep Impact (JPN) 2002	Wind in Her Hair (IRE); 1991	Alzao (USA)	Lady Rebecca (GB)
Sire Deep Impact (JPN) 2002	Wind in Her Hair (IRE); 1991	Burghclere (GB)	Busted
Sire Deep Impact (JPN) 2002	Wind in Her Hair (IRE); 1991	Burghclere (GB)	Highclere
Dam Shells Lei (JPN) 2003	Kurofune (USA); 1998	French Deputy	Deputy Minister (CAN)
Dam Shells Lei (JPN) 2003	Kurofune (USA); 1998	French Deputy	Mitterand
Dam Shells Lei (JPN) 2003	Kurofune (USA); 1998	Blue Avenue	Classic Go Go
Dam Shells Lei (JPN) 2003	Kurofune (USA); 1998	Blue Avenue	Eliza Blue
Dam Shells Lei (JPN) 2003	Oyster Ticket (JPN); 1998	Winning Ticket	Tony Bin (IRE)
Dam Shells Lei (JPN) 2003	Oyster Ticket (JPN); 1998	Winning Ticket	Powerful Lady
Dam Shells Lei (JPN) 2003	Oyster Ticket (JPN); 1998	Namura Pieris	Tosho Boy
Dam Shells Lei (JPN) 2003	Oyster Ticket (JPN); 1998	Namura Pieris	Yamani Sakura (Family: 3-l)
