= Akai Ito (horse) =

Japanese Thoroughbred racehorse

Akai Ito; アカイイト
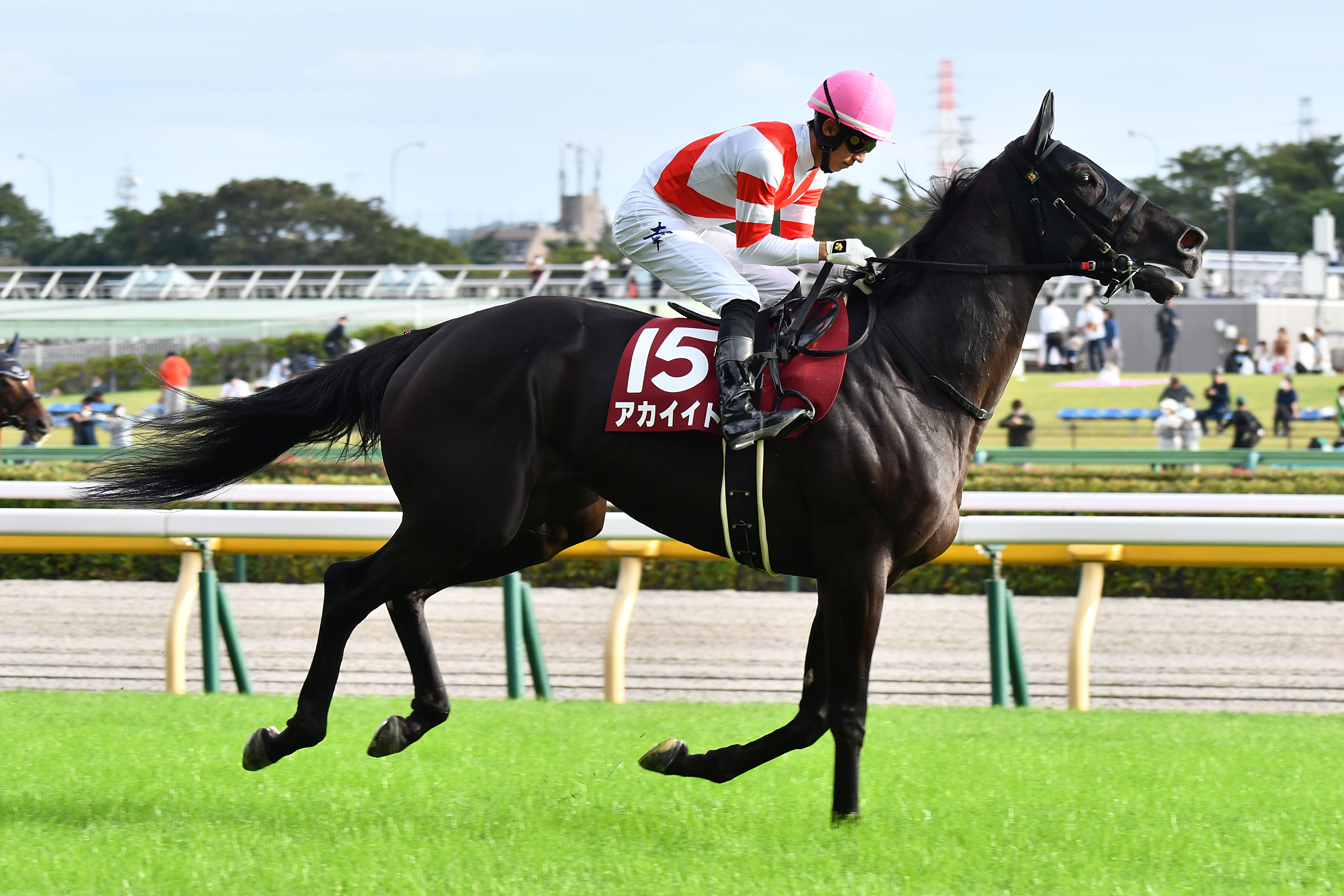
- Akai Ito at the Fuchu Himba Stakes in 2022
- Sire: Kizuna
- Grandsire: Deep Impact
- Dam: Wadjet
- Damsire: Symboli Kris S
- Sex: Mare
- Foaled: 17 April 2017
- Country: Japan
- Colour: Brown
- Breeder: Tsuji Bokujo
- Owner: Koji Oka
- Racing colours
- Trainer: Kazuya Nakatake
- Jockey: Hideaki Miyuki
- Record: 27: 5-4-2
- Earnings: ¥230,029,000

Major wins
- Queen Elizabeth II Cup (2021)

Akai Ito (Japanese: アカイイト foaled 17 April 2017) is a retired Japanese Thoroughbred racehorse and broodmare. She proved to be a successful, though unremarkable racehorse in her first two seasons, winning minor races at Hanshin in 2019 and Sapporo in 2020. As a four-year-old, she made significant improvement, winning races at Chukyo and Hanshin before recording an upset victory in the Grade 1 Queen Elizabeth II Cup.

== Background ==
Akai Ito is a brown mare bred by her owner, Koji Oka's Tsuji Bokujo. She was sent into training with Kazuya Nakatake. Akai Ito is a large thoroughbred mare, weighing more than 510 kg in her racing career.

She was from the first crop of foals sired by Kizuna whose wins included the Tokyo Yushun, Prix Niel and Osaka Hai. His other foals have included Songline and Deep Bond. Akai Ito's dam Wadjet showed modest racing ability, winning two minor races from twenty-one starts. She was a female-line descendant of the Kentucky-bred broodmare New Year's Eve, a half-sister to Tom Fool.

== Racing career ==
=== 2019: two-year-old season ===
Akai Ito began her track career by finishing fourth in a contest for previously unraced juveniles over 1400 metres on firm ground at Hanshin Racecourse on 7 September. Three weeks later at the same track the filly was ridden by Yuichi Fukunaga when she started at odds of 2.8/1 for a maiden race over 2000 metres and recorded her first success as she took the lead in the straight and won by one and a quarter lengths from the colt Panthalassa (later to win the Dubai Turf and Saudi Cup). In three subsequent races that year she ran second to Ho O Peaceful at Tokyo Racecourse on 3 November, came home eighth behind Hygge in the Erica Sho at Hanshin on 7 December and finished fifth to Christie in a minor race at the same track three weeks later.

=== 2020: three-year-old season ===
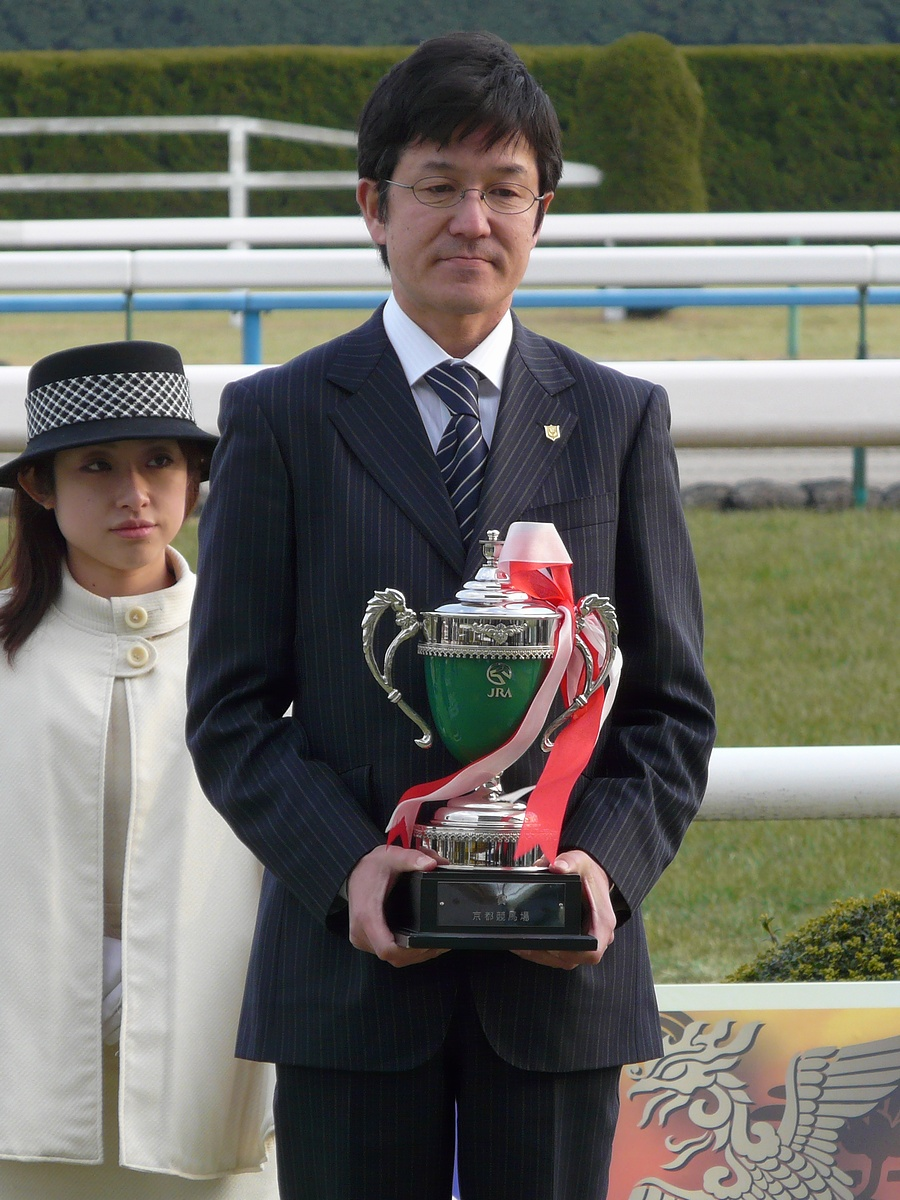
Akai Ito's trainer Kazuya Nakatake

On her three-year-old debut Akai Ito finished fourth in the Wakatake Sho over 1800 metres at Nakayama Racecourse on 26 January and went on to fill the same position in the Okanzaruka Sho over 2200 metres at Chukyo Racecourse in March and the Listed Wasurenagusa Sho over 2000 metres at Hanshin in April. She ended her spring campaign by running second to Soft Fruit in the Yagurama Sho over 2200 metres at Kyoto Racecourse on 2 May. After a three-month-break the filly returned for an 1800-metre race at Sapporo Racecourse on 1 August when she was ridden by Norihiro Yokoyama and started the 1.4/1 second favourite in a nine-runner field which included older fillies and mares. She recorded her only success of the season as she came from third place on the final turn, took the advantage inside the last 200 metres and won by one and a half lengths from Chocolat Brilliant. Two weeks later at the same track she finished fifth behind Shaft of Light in the Moiwayama Tokobetsu over 2200 metres. Akai Ito was then elevated in class for the Grade 2 Rose Stakes over 2000 metres at Chukyo on 20 September when she stayed on well from the rear of the field to finish seventh of the eighteen runners behind Ria Amelia, beaten four and a half lengths by the winner. On her final run of the year she finished fifth in a minor race over 2000 metres at Nakayama on 19 December.

=== 2021: four-year-old season ===
Akai Ito began her third season on 24 January in the Nishio Tokubetsu over 2000 metres on heavy ground at Chukyo and started the 3.2/1 third choice in an eight-runner field. Ridden by Kohei Matsuyama she raced towards the rear before making a sustained run on the wide outside in the straight and won by one and a half lengths from Elevatezza. She went on to be placed in her next three starts, finishing second to Red Belle Deesse in the Asuka Stakes over 1800 metres at Hanshin in February, third to Pride Land in the Kyobashi Stakes over 2000 metres at the same track in April and third to Soft Fruit in the 2000 metre ATC Sydney Trophy at Chukyo in May. On 20 June at Akai Ito was ridden by Yokoyama when she started the 2.9/1 favourite for the 1800 metre Tarumi Stakes at Hanshin. She raced towards the rear and was sixteenth of the eighteen runners on the final turn but then launched a powerful run on the outside and overtook the five-year-old horse Saturn in the final strides to win by a head.

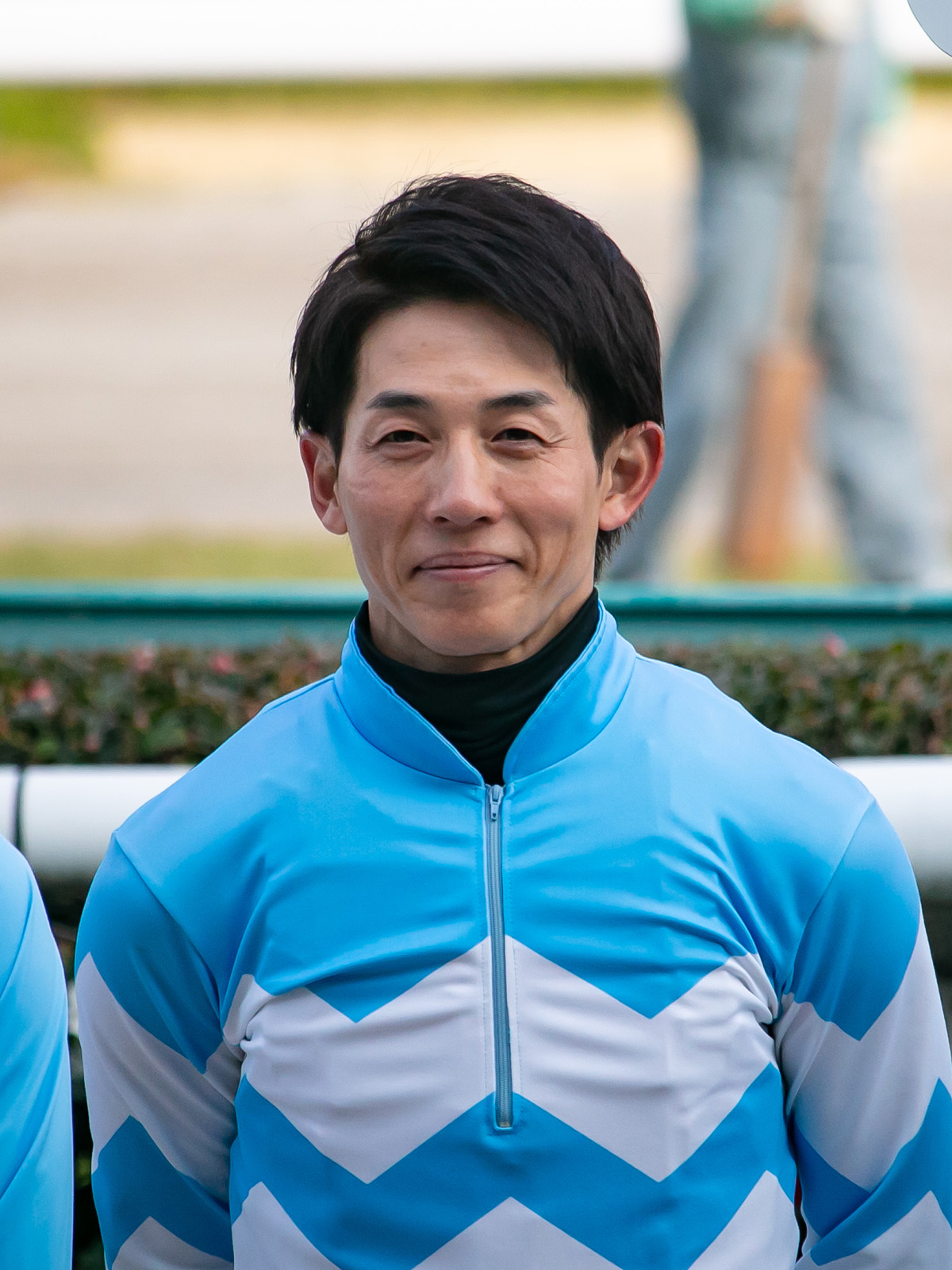
Hideaki Miyuki, who rode Akai Ito to win the Queen Elizabeth II Cup

After a summer break, Akai Ito returned in the Grade 2 Fuchu Himba Stakes at Tokyo on 16 October and came home seventh of the eighteen runners behind Shadow Diva. Despite never having won or placed in a Graded stakes race, the mare was then stepped up to the highest level to contest the Grade 1 Queen Elizabeth II Cup over 2200 metres at Hanshin on 14 November with Hideaki Miyuki in the saddle and went off at odds of 64/1 in a seventeen-runner field. Lei Papale started favourite while the other contenders included Akaitorino Musume, Win Marilyn (Sankei Sho All Comers), Terzetto (Lord Derby Challenge Trophy), Win Kiitos (Meguro Kinen), Rambling Alley (Nakayama Himba Stakes), Des Ailes (Hanshin Himba Stakes) and Soft Fruit. Akai Ito was towards the back of the field as usual but made a forward move on the far outside approaching the final turn. She maintained her progress in the straight, overtook Lei Papale 200 metres from the finish and won by two lengths from Stellaria. After the race Miyuki said “As she seemed to be a bit tense when I trained her the other day, I tried to race her in her own rhythm... I was able to eventually race her in the intended position at the backstretch. I was confident that she would stretch well and I made bid earlier than usual. We were able to take the front earlier than I had expected and, as there was no horse right behind us, I just kept on urging her to go." Her trainer Kazuya Nakatake commented "She was really strong. I think it really helped having had a good long rest until the Fuchu Himba Stakes. She was in excellent shape but the jockey’s judgment was excellent too. And things came together very well for her."

Akai Ito ended her season in the Arima Kinen over 2500 metres at Nakayama on 26 December. She started at odds of 30.8/1 and stayed on well in the straight without ever looking likely to win and came home sixth behind Efforia, beaten six and three quarter lengths by the winner.

=== 2022: five-year-old season ===
On her first run as a five-year-old Akai Ito started at odds of 16.8/1 for the Grade 2 Kinko Sho over 2000 metres at Chukyo on 13 March and finished third behind Jack d'Or and Lei Papale. On 3 April at Hanshin she contested the Grade 1 Osaka Hai and came home tenth of the eighteen runners, five lengths behind the upset winner Potager. Akai Ito returned to all-female competition for the Victoria Mile at Tokyo on 15 May when she finished eighth behind Sodashi, beaten just over four lengths by the winner. She once again ran at the Fuchu Himba Stakes, Q.E.II Cup, and the Arima Kinen, but the closest she came to victory in either of those three races were the Q.E. II Cup, where she came in fourth behind Geraldina.

Following her defeat at Arima, her trainer announced that Akai Ito will retire and become a broodmare at Sunday Hills, which is owned by Koji Oka.

== Racing form ==
Akai Ito won five races out of 27 starts. This data is available in JBIS and netkeiba.

Date	Track	Race	Grade	Distance (Condition)	Entry	HN	Odds (Favored)	Finish	Time	Margins	Jockey	Winner (Runner-up)
2019 – two-year-old season
Sep 7	Hanshin	2yo Newcomer		1,400 m (Firm)	14	6	7.2 (2)	4th	1:22.4	0.6	Yuichi Fukunaga	Fairest Isle
Sep 28	Hanshin	2yo Maiden		2,000 m (Firm)	7	4	3.8 (2)	1st	2:02.4	–0.2	Yuichi Fukunaga	(Panthalassa)
Nov 3	Tokyo	Hyakunichiso Tokubetsu	1W	2,000 m (Firm)	5	1	4.4 (3)	2nd	2:02.2	0.3	Shu Ishibashi	Ho O Peaceful
Dec 7	Hanshin	Erica Sho	1W	2,000 m (Firm)	11	11	3.8 (1)	8th	2:01.5	0.9	Yuichi Fukunaga	Hygge
Dec 28	Hanshin	2yo Allowance	1W	1,800 m (Firm)	11	11	15.3 (7)	5th	1:48.0	0.2	Yuichi Fukunaga	Christie
2020 – three-year-old season
Jan 26	Nakayama	Wakatake Sho	1W	1,800 m (Good)	11	3	6.8 (5)	4th	1:51.0	0.6	Norihiro Yokoyama	Season's Gift
Mar 29	Chukyo	Okanzakura Sho	1W	2,200 m (Soft)	10	9	4.1 (2)	4th	2:18.0	0.5	Norihiro Yokoyama	Meisho Bosatsu
Apr 12	Hanshin	Wasurenagusa Sho	L	2,000 m (Good)	10	4	13.1 (5)	4th	2:04.1	0.5	Hironobu Tanabe	Win Mighty
May 2	Kyoto	Yaguruma Sho	1W	2,200 m (Firm)	10	10	3.3 (2)	2nd	2:13.4	0.1	Christophe Lemaire	Soft Fruit
Aug 1	Sapporo	3yo+ Allowance	1W	1,800 m (Firm)	9	4	2.4 (2)	1st	1:47.6	–0.2	Norihiro Yokoyama	(Chocolate Brillante)
Aug 16	Sapporo	Moiwayama Tokubetsu	2W	2,000 m (Firm)	13	3	2.4 (1)	5th	2:02.1	0.2	Taisei Danno	Shaft of Light
Sep 20	Chukyo	Rose Stakes	2	2,000 m (Firm)	18	11	64.6 (12)	7th	2:00.6	0.7	Yusuke Fujioka	Ria Amelia
Dec 19	Nakayama	3yo+ Allowance	2W	2,000 m (Firm)	15	9	4.5 (2)	5th	2:04.8	0.3	Kosei Miura	Moonlight Night
2021 – four-year-old season
Jan 24	Chukyo	Nishio Tokubetsu	2W	2,000 m (Heavy)	8	5	4.2 (3)	1st	2:06.3	0.3	Kohei Matsuyama	(Elevatezza)
Feb 13	Hanshin	Asuka Stakes	3W	1,800 m (Firm)	9	4	5.7 (5)	2nd	1:46.3	0.0	Masayoshi Ebina	Red Belle Deesse
Apr 24	Hanshin	Kyobashi Stakes	3W	2,000 m (Firm)	11	1	4.6 (3)	3rd	1:58.7	0.2	Fuuma Matsuwaka	Pride Land
May 22	Chukyo	A. T. C. Sydney Trophy	3W	2,000 m (Good)	12	3	2.5 (1)	2nd	2:01.2	0.1	Kohei Matsuyama	Soft Fruit
Jun 20	Hanshin	Tarumi Stakes	3W	1,800 m (Firm)	18	6	3.9 (1)	1st	1:46.6	0.0	Norihiro Yokoyama	(Saturn)
Oct 16	Tokyo	Ireland Trophy	2	1,800 m (Firm)	18	16	31.1 (12)	7th	1:46.1	0.5	Norihiro Yokoyama	Shadow Diva
Nov 14	Hanshin	QEII Cup	1	2,200 m (Firm)	17	16	64.9 (10)	1st	2:12.1	–0.3	Hideaki Miyuki	(Stellaria)
Dec 26	Nakayama	Arima Kinen	1	2,500 m (Firm)	16	13	31.8 (6)	7th	2:33.1	1.1	Hideaki Miyuki	Efforia
2022 – five-year-old season
Mar 13	Chukyo	Kinko Sho	2	2,000 m (Firm)	13	6	17.8 (5)	3rd	1:57.8	0.6	Hideaki Miyuki	Jack d'Or
Apr 2	Hanshin	Osaka Hai	1	2,000 m (Firm)	16	5	20.4 (4)	10th	1:59.2	0.8	Hideaki Miyuki	Potager
May 15	Tokyo	Victoria Mile	1	1,600 m (Firm)	18	14	41.8 (12)	8th	1:32.8	0.6	Hideaki Miyuki	Sodashi
Oct 15	Tokyo	Ireland Trophy	2	1,800 m (Firm)	15	15	19.0 (8)	10th	1:45.5	1.0	Hideaki Miyuki	Izu Jo no Kiseki
Nov 13	Hanshin	QEII Cup	1	2,200 m (Soft)	18	14	24.4 (11)	4th	2:13.7	0.7	Hideaki Miyuki	Geraldina
Dec 25	Nakayama	Arima Kinen	1	2,500 m (Firm)	16	1	79.0 (9)	15th	2:35.0	2.6	Hideaki Miyuki	Equinox

Legend:
Turf

== Pedigree ==
Pedigree of Akai Ito (JPN), brown mare, 2017
Sire Kizuna (JPN) 2010	Deep Impact (JPN); 2002	Sunday Silence (USA)	Halo
Sire Kizuna (JPN) 2010	Deep Impact (JPN); 2002	Sunday Silence (USA)	Wishing Well
Sire Kizuna (JPN) 2010	Deep Impact (JPN); 2002	Wind in Her Hair (IRE)	Alzao (USA)
Sire Kizuna (JPN) 2010	Deep Impact (JPN); 2002	Wind in Her Hair (IRE)	Burghclere (GB)
Sire Kizuna (JPN) 2010	Catequil (CAN); 1990	Storm Cat (USA)	Storm Bird (CAN)
Sire Kizuna (JPN) 2010	Catequil (CAN); 1990	Storm Cat (USA)	Terlingua
Sire Kizuna (JPN) 2010	Catequil (CAN); 1990	Pacific Princess (USA)	Damascus (USA)
Sire Kizuna (JPN) 2010	Catequil (CAN); 1990	Pacific Princess (USA)	Fiji (GB)
Dam Wadjet (JPN) 2008	Symboli Kris S (USA); 1999	Kris S	Roberto
Dam Wadjet (JPN) 2008	Symboli Kris S (USA); 1999	Kris S	Sharp Queen
Dam Wadjet (JPN) 2008	Symboli Kris S (USA); 1999	Tee Kay	Gold Meridain
Dam Wadjet (JPN) 2008	Symboli Kris S (USA); 1999	Tee Kay	Tri Argo
Dam Wadjet (JPN) 2008	Reach To Peace (USA); 2001	Mud Route	Strawberry Road (AUS)
Dam Wadjet (JPN) 2008	Reach To Peace (USA); 2001	Mud Route	Our Suzette
Dam Wadjet (JPN) 2008	Reach To Peace (USA); 2001	Waki Betty	Miswaki
Dam Wadjet (JPN) 2008	Reach To Peace (USA); 2001	Waki Betty	Auntie Betty (Family: 3-j)
