= Win Marilyn =

Japanese-bred Thoroughbred racehorse (foaled 2017)

Win Marilyn; ウインマリリン
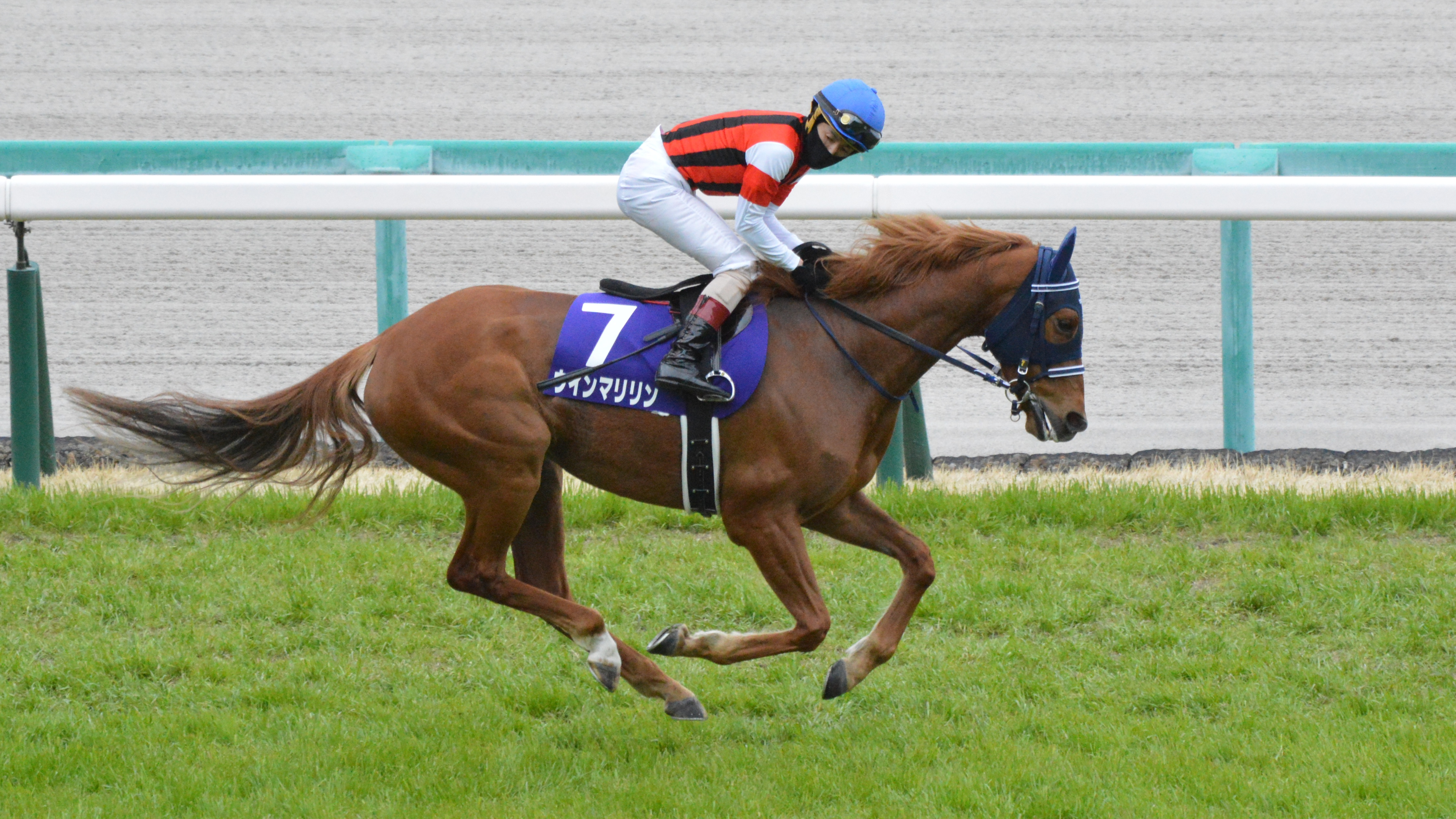
- Win Marilyn at the 2022 Takarazuka Kinen.
- Breed: Thoroughbred
- Sire: Screen Hero (JPN)
- Grandsire: Grass Wonder (USA)
- Dam: Cosmo Cielo (AUS)
- Damsire: Fusaichi Pegasus (JPN)
- Sex: Mare
- Foaled: May 23, 2017 (age 9)
- Country: Japan
- Colour: Chestnut
- Breeder: Cosmo View Farm
- Owner: Win Co. Ltd.
- Racing colours
- Trainer: Takahisa Tezuka
- Jockey: Takeshi Yokoyama; Masami Matsuoka; Norihiro Yokoyama; Damian Lane; Cristian Demuro; Luke Morris
- Record: 22: 6-2-1
- Earnings: ¥565,822,900

Major wins
- Hong Kong Vase (2022); Flora Stakes (2020); Nikkei Sho (2021); Sankei Sho All Comers (2021)

Win Marilyn (Japanese: ウインマリリン, Uin Maririn; foaled 23 May 2017) is a retired Japanese Thoroughbred racehorse. She competed from 2019 to 2023, recording six wins from twenty-two starts, including the Hong Kong Vase in 2022, the Flora Stakes in 2020, the Nikkei Sho in 2021, and the Sankei Sho All Comers in 2021. She also finished second in the Yushun Himba in 2020 and in the Queen Elizabeth II Cup in 2022. Her name combines the owner's prefix "Win" with "Marilyn", a feminine given name.

== Background ==
Win Marilyn is a chestnut mare bred in Niikappu, Hokkaido, by Cosmo View Farm. She was sired by Screen Hero, a son of Grass Wonder, and her dam was Cosmo Cielo (コスモチェーロ), a mare by Fusaichi Pegasus. She is owned by Win Co. Ltd. and was trained by Takahisa Tezuka at the JRA's Miho Training Center. Her half-brother Win Malerei (ウインマーレライ) won the 2014 Radio Nikkei Sho.

== Racing career ==
=== 2019: two-year-old season ===
Win Marilyn debuted on 21 December 2019 in a 2-year-old newcomer race over 2000 metres on turf at Nakayama Racecourse. Ridden by Takeshi Yokoyama, she tracked the pace and took the lead in the straight, winning by 0.6 seconds from Belinda Un.

=== 2020: three-year-old season ===
She started her three-year-old campaign on 26 January in the Wakatake Sho (1-win class) at Nakayama, finishing fifth. On 31 March, she won the Mimosa Sho (1-win class) at Nakayama, holding off Win Kiitos by 0.3 seconds.

On 26 April, she stepped up to graded stakes level in the Flora Stakes (GII) at Tokyo Racecourse. Ridden by Takeshi Yokoyama, she broke from the front and held off the late challenge of Ho O Peaceful to win by a neck, securing her first graded stakes victory and priority entry slot to the Yushun Himba.

On 24 May, she contested the Yushun Himba (Japanese Oaks, GI) at Tokyo. As Takeshi was serving a suspension at the time, she was instead ridden by Takeshi's father, Norihiro Yokoyama. During the race, she settled in second place behind the front-running Smile Kana. In the straight, she took the shortest path on the inside rail but was caught in the final strides by Daring Tact, finishing second by half a length.

After a summer break, she ran in the Shūka Shō (GI) on 18 October at Kyoto Racecourse, finishing 15th. On 15 November, she faced older horses for the first time in the Queen Elizabeth II Cup (GI) at Hanshin Racecourse, finishing fourth behind Lucky Lilac.

=== 2021: four-year-old season ===
Win Marilyn started the season on 24 January in the American Jockey Club Cup (GII) at Nakayama, finishing sixth. On 27 March, she ran in the Nikkei Sho (GII) at Nakayama. She broke well, settled near the pace, and took the lead early in the straight, holding on to win her second graded stakes race.

On 2 May, she contested the Tenno Sho (Spring) (GI) at Hanshin over 3200 metres. Despite a slow start, she rallied on the outside to finish fifth behind World Premiere.

After a break, she returned in the Sankei Sho All Comers (GII) on 26 September at Nakayama. Breaking from the inside draw, she saved ground on the rail, switched outside in the straight, and held off Win Kiitos to win by 0.3 seconds. On 14 November, she ran in the Queen Elizabeth II Cup again but finished 16th.

=== 2022: five-year-old season ===
She started the year in the Ōsaka Hai (GI) on 3 April at Hanshin, finishing last (16th) behind Potager. On 26 June, she ran in the Takarazuka Kinen (GI) at Hanshin, finishing seventh behind Titleholder. On 21 August, she ran in the Sapporo Kinen (GII) at Sapporo Racecourse. Ridden by Masami Matsuoka, she tracked the pace and finished third behind Jack d'Or and Panthalassa.

On 13 November, she contested the Queen Elizabeth II Cup for the third time. Ridden by Damian Lane, she settled just off the pace on the outside. Taking the lead 200 metres from the finish on a heavy track, she was ultimately caught by Geraldina, finishing in a dead heat for second with Lilac.

She was then invited to the Hong Kong Vase (GI) at Sha Tin Racecourse on 11 December. Skipping the Japan Cup, she traveled to Hong Kong. Ridden by Damian Lane, she was sent off as the third favorite. Departing from her usual front-running tactics, Lane dropped her to the rear of the 10-horse field. In the straight, she swung wide and produced a strong late burst, overtaking Botanik in the final strides to win by 1.5 lengths. This marked her first Grade 1 victory and her first win overseas.

=== 2023: six-year-old season ===
On 25 March, she contested the Dubai Sheema Classic (GI) at Meydan Racecourse. Settling in mid-pack, she failed to accelerate in the straight and finished sixth behind Equinox.

After a five-month break, she returned in the Sapporo Kinen on 20 August, finishing ninth. On 24 September, she ran in the Sankei Sho All Comers, finishing ninth.

She then traveled to the United States for the Breeders' Cup Filly & Mare Turf (GI) at Santa Anita Park on 4 November. Ridden by Cristian Demuro, she raced near the rear and threaded through traffic in the straight, finishing fourth behind Inspiral.

Her final race was the Arima Kinen (GI) on 24 December at Nakayama. Ridden by Luke Morris, she settled in mid-pack and finished seventh behind Do Deuce.

== Race record ==
The following table details all 22 starts of Win Marilyn's racing career based on official JBIS, netkeiba, HKJC, and Equibase records.

Date	Distance (Condition)	Race	Class	Course	Odds (Favourite)	Field	Finish	Time	Jockey	Winning (Losing) Margin	Winner (2nd Place)	Ref
2019 – two-year-old season
Dec 21	Turf 2000 m (Good)	2-Y-O Newcomer	Maiden	Nakayama	12.2 (6th)	16	1st	2:04.0	Takeshi Yokoyama	–0.6	(Belinda Un)	
2020 – three-year-old season
Jan 26	Turf 1800 m (Yielding)	Wakatake Sho	1-win	Nakayama	5.6 (3rd)	11	5th	1:51.0	Masami Matsuoka	0.6	Seasons Gift	
Mar 31	Turf 2000 m (Yielding)	Mimosa Sho	1-win	Nakayama	6.4 (4th)	11	1st	2:02.5	Takeshi Yokoyama	–0.3	(Win Kiitos)	
Apr 26	Turf 2000 m (Good)	Flora Stakes	GII	Tokyo	11.4 (4th)	17	1st	1:58.7	Takeshi Yokoyama	–0.0	(Ho O Peaceful)	
May 24	Turf 2400 m (Good)	Yushun Himba	GI	Tokyo	28.5 (7th)	18	2nd	2:24.5	Norihiro Yokoyama	0.1	Daring Tact	
Oct 18	Turf 2000 m (Yielding)	Shūka Shō	GI	Kyoto	17.2 (5th)	18	15th	2:03.1	Takeshi Yokoyama	2.5	Daring Tact	
Nov 15	Turf 2200 m (Good)	Queen Elizabeth II Cup	GI	Hanshin	40.8 (9th)	18	4th	2:10.7	Takeshi Yokoyama	0.4	Lucky Lilac	
2021 – four-year-old season
Jan 24	Turf 2200 m (Heavy)	American Jockey Club Cup	GII	Nakayama	10.5 (5th)	17	6th	2:18.3	Takeshi Yokoyama	0.4	Aristoteles	
Mar 27	Turf 2500 m (Good)	Nikkei Sho	GII	Nakayama	8.5 (4th)	15	1st	2:33.3	Takeshi Yokoyama	–0.1	(Curren Bouquetd'or)	
May 2	Turf 3200 m (Good)	Tenno Sho (Spring)	GI	Hanshin	22.7 (8th)	17	5th	3:15.6	Takeshi Yokoyama	0.9	World Premiere	
Sep 26	Turf 2200 m (Good)	Sankei Sho All Comers	GII	Nakayama	4.7 (2nd)	16	1st	2:11.9	Takeshi Yokoyama	–0.3	(Win Kiitos)	
Nov 14	Turf 2200 m (Good)	Queen Elizabeth II Cup	GI	Hanshin	5.5 (3rd)	17	16th	2:14.7	Takeshi Yokoyama	2.6	Akai Ito	
2022 – five-year-old season
Apr 3	Turf 2000 m (Good)	Ōsaka Hai	GI	Hanshin	60.2 (9th)	16	16th	2:00.7	Masami Matsuoka	2.3	Potager	
Jun 26	Turf 2200 m (Good)	Takarazuka Kinen	GI	Hanshin	73.0 (9th)	17	7th	2:10.8	Masami Matsuoka	1.1	Titleholder	
Aug 21	Turf 2000 m (Good)	Sapporo Kinen	GII	Sapporo	13.6 (5th)	16	3rd	2:01.4	Masami Matsuoka	0.2	Jack d'Or	
Nov 13	Turf 2200 m (Heavy)	Queen Elizabeth II Cup	GI	Hanshin	10.1 (5th)	18	2nd	2:13.3	Damian Lane	0.3	Geraldina	
Dec 11	Turf 2400 m (Good)	Hong Kong Vase	GI	Sha Tin	6.5 (3rd)	10	1st	2:27.53	Damian Lane	–0.23	(Botanik)	
2023 – six-year-old season
Mar 25	Turf 2410 m (Good)	Dubai Sheema Classic	GI	Meydan	19.8 (6th)	10	6th	2:27.14	Damian Lane	1.49	Equinox	
Aug 20	Turf 2000 m (Yielding)	Sapporo Kinen	GII	Sapporo	11.9 (6th)	15	9th	2:04.0	Masami Matsuoka	2.5	Prognosis	
Sep 24	Turf 2200 m (Good)	Sankei Sho All Comers	GII	Nakayama	44.0 (9th)	15	9th	2:12.8	Masami Matsuoka	0.8	Rousham Park	
Nov 4	Turf 2000 m (Good)	Breeders' Cup Filly & Mare Turf	GI	Santa Anita Park	39.9 (11th)	12	4th	1:59.29	Cristian Demuro	0.23	Inspiral	
Dec 24	Turf 2500 m (Good)	Arima Kinen	GI	Nakayama	171.9 (14th)	16	7th	2:31.6	Luke Morris	0.7	Do Deuce	

== Breeding career ==
Win Marilyn retired from racing on December 27, 2023 and returned to Cosmo View Farm to become a broodmare. As of 2026, she has produced two foals.

c = colt, f = filly

No.	Name	Foaled	Sex	Color	Sire	Races	Wins	Remarks
1st	(Win Marilyn 2025)	2025	c	Bay	Titleholder			
2nd	(Win Marilyn 2026)	2026	f	Bay	Equinox			

== In popular culture ==
An anthropomorphized version of Win Marilyn appears as a character in the Japanese multimedia franchise Umamusume: Pretty Derby, voiced by Chinatsu Hirose. She is the daughter of a famous actor, with Win Marilyn herself being a former child actress. She normally behaves gracefully, but her most notable role in acting was that of an antagonistic delinquent seeking to crush her rivals in races that she assumes on the racetrack herself, primarily by loudly taunting her opponents. Her design and background are references to actress Marilyn Monroe, with Win Marilyn's racing outfit's pose artwork resembling Monroe's in the 1955 film The Seven Year Itch. She was officially revealed during the PakaLive TV broadcast on October 24, 2026.

== Pedigree ==
Pedigree of Win Marilyn (JPN), chestnut mare, 2017
Sire Screen Hero (JPN) 2004	Grass Wonder (USA); 1995	Silver Hawk (USA)	Roberto
Sire Screen Hero (JPN) 2004	Grass Wonder (USA); 1995	Silver Hawk (USA)	Gris Vitesse
Sire Screen Hero (JPN) 2004	Grass Wonder (USA); 1995	Ameriflora (USA)	Danzig
Sire Screen Hero (JPN) 2004	Grass Wonder (USA); 1995	Ameriflora (USA)	Graceful Touch
Sire Screen Hero (JPN) 2004	Running Heroine (JPN); 1993	Sunday Silence (USA)	Halo
Sire Screen Hero (JPN) 2004	Running Heroine (JPN); 1993	Sunday Silence (USA)	Wishing Well
Sire Screen Hero (JPN) 2004	Running Heroine (JPN); 1993	Dyna Actress (JPN)	Northern Taste
Sire Screen Hero (JPN) 2004	Running Heroine (JPN); 1993	Dyna Actress (JPN)	Model Sport
Dam Cosmo Cielo (AUS) 2003	Fusaichi Pegasus (USA); 1997	Mr. Prospector (USA)	Raise a Native
Dam Cosmo Cielo (AUS) 2003	Fusaichi Pegasus (USA); 1997	Mr. Prospector (USA)	Gold Digger
Dam Cosmo Cielo (AUS) 2003	Fusaichi Pegasus (USA); 1997	Angel Fever (USA)	Danzig
Dam Cosmo Cielo (AUS) 2003	Fusaichi Pegasus (USA); 1997	Angel Fever (USA)	Rowdy Angel
Dam Cosmo Cielo (AUS) 2003	Shorwon (AUS); 1983	Buena Shore (USA)	George Lewis
Dam Cosmo Cielo (AUS) 2003	Shorwon (AUS); 1983	Buena Shore (USA)	Full View
Dam Cosmo Cielo (AUS) 2003	Shorwon (AUS); 1983	April Wonder (USA)	Newtown Wonder
Dam Cosmo Cielo (AUS) 2003	Shorwon (AUS); 1983	April Wonder (USA)	April Flower

- Win Marilyn is inbred 4 × 4 to Danzig, 5 × 5 × 5 to Northern Dancer, 4 × 5 to Halo, and 5 × 5 to Hail to Reason.
- Her sire Screen Hero won the 2008 Japan Cup.
- Her half-brother Win Malerei won the 2014 Radio Nikkei Sho.
- Her half-sister Meine Himmel is the dam of Koganeno Sora, who won the 2024 Queen S and the 2026 Fukushima Himba Stakes, and the granddam of Corazon Beat, who won the 2023 Keio Hai Nisai Stakes.

== See also ==
- Thoroughbred racing in Japan
- Hong Kong Vase
