= Geraldina (horse) =

Japanese racehorse

Geraldina ジェラルディーナ 吉典娜
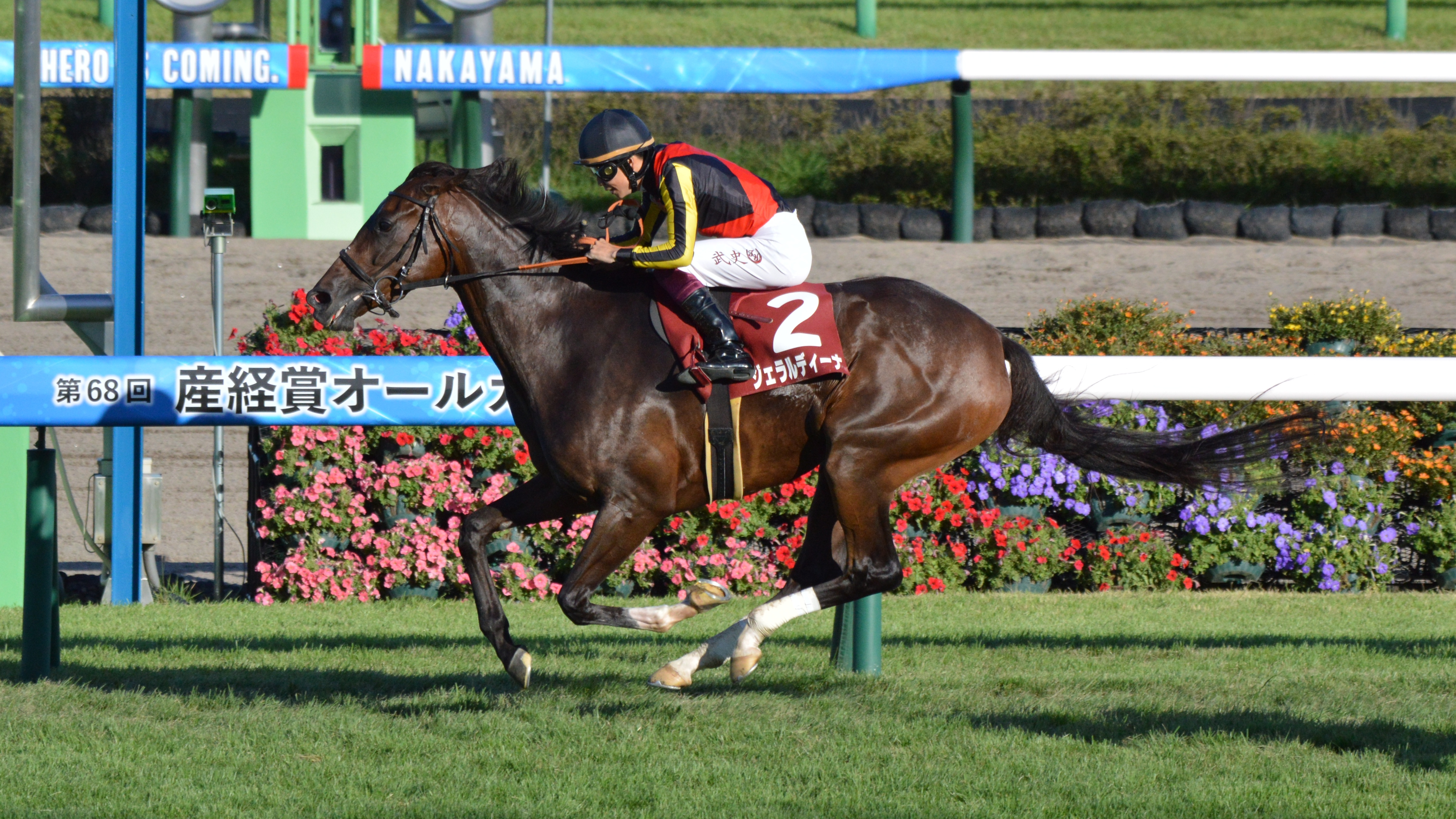
- Geraldina winning the 2022 Sankei Sho All Comers
- Breed: Thoroughbred
- Sire: Maurice
- Grandsire: Screen Hero
- Dam: Gentildonna
- Damsire: Deep Impact
- Sex: Mare
- Foaled: May 12, 2018 (age 8)
- Country: Japan
- Color: Bay
- Breeder: Northern Farm
- Owner: Sunday Racing
- Racing colors
- Trainer: Sei Ishizaka → Takashi Saito
- Jockey: Cristian Demuro; Yuichi Fukunaga
- Record: 23: 6-2-3; JRA: 21:6-2-3; Hong Kong: 2:0-0-0
- Earnings: 478,257,700 JPY; Japan: 445,447,000 JPY; Hong Kong: 194,000,000 HKD

Major wins
- Queen Elizabeth II Cup (2022); Sankei Sho All Comers (2022)

Awards
- JRA Award for Best Older Filly or Mare（2022）

Geraldina (Japanese: ジェラルディーナ, Hepburn: Jerarudīna; May 12, 2018) is a retired Japanese racehorse and broodmare.

She was voted the Best Older Filly or Mare of 2022 following her major wins at the Queen Elizabeth II Cup and Sankei Sho All Comers that year.

== Background ==
Geraldina's dam, Gentildonna, was the winner of the Triple Tiara in 2012 who went on to win a total of 7 Grade I races. Geraldina's sire, Maurice, also won 6 Grade I races including the Yasuda Kinen, Mile Championship, and the Hong Kong Mile.

Geraldina was owned by Sunday Racing, a company that offers stakes in horse ownership (Hitokuchi Banushi; Japanese: 一口馬主), that offered a share for 1.75 million yen each for a total of 70 million yen.

== Racing career ==
=== 2020: Two-year-old season ===
Geraldina started her racing career at a debut race held at Chukyo Racecourse in September, where she finished at third place. She finished second on her second race, and won her first race in her third race.

She would later run her first graded race, the Hanshin Juvenile Fillies, that December, but finished seventh behind Sodashi.

=== 2021: Three-year-old season ===
Geraldina started the season by contesting the Elfin Stakes, where she finished 10th. Following this race, her original trainer, Sei Ishizaka, retired on February 28 due to age restrictions, and the horse was transferred to Takashi Saito's stable.

After switching trainers, Geraldina ran her first race with older horses at the Shirosaki Tokubetsu, held on June 27 at the Hanshin Racecourse. In that race, her right buckle came loose and finished at eighth place as a result. Saito was fined 200,000JPY following this incident.

Geraldina saw better success after this race, however. As she went on to win 3 races in a row. She did not run the Shuka Sho, but rather opted to enter the Challenge Cup held in December, where she finished fourth behind So Valiant.

=== 2022: Four-year-old season ===
Geraldina continued to compete in races but was unable to secure a win, finishing 3rd behind Maria Elena in the Kokura Kinen despite being the most favored to win. However, in her next race, the Sankei Sho All Comers, she was able to run at a steady pace among the pack, placing herself in the inner side of the track, and overtook the rest of the pack, including favored Triple Tiara winner Daring Tact, and won her first graded race. This race also marked the first graded race victory for a Gentildonna foal.

Following this victory, she entered the Queen Elizabeth II Cup with Cristian Demuro as her new jockey. She ran among the rear of the pack for most of the race, but quickly overtook the lead from the outside on the final stretch, securing her first Grade I victory.

Geraldina was then entered in to the Arima Kinen to finish off the season. However, she started late and trailed the pack third from last. Despite this she pushed hard to regain the lead, and tried to overtake the lead on the final stretch, only to finish third behind Equinox and Boldog Hos.

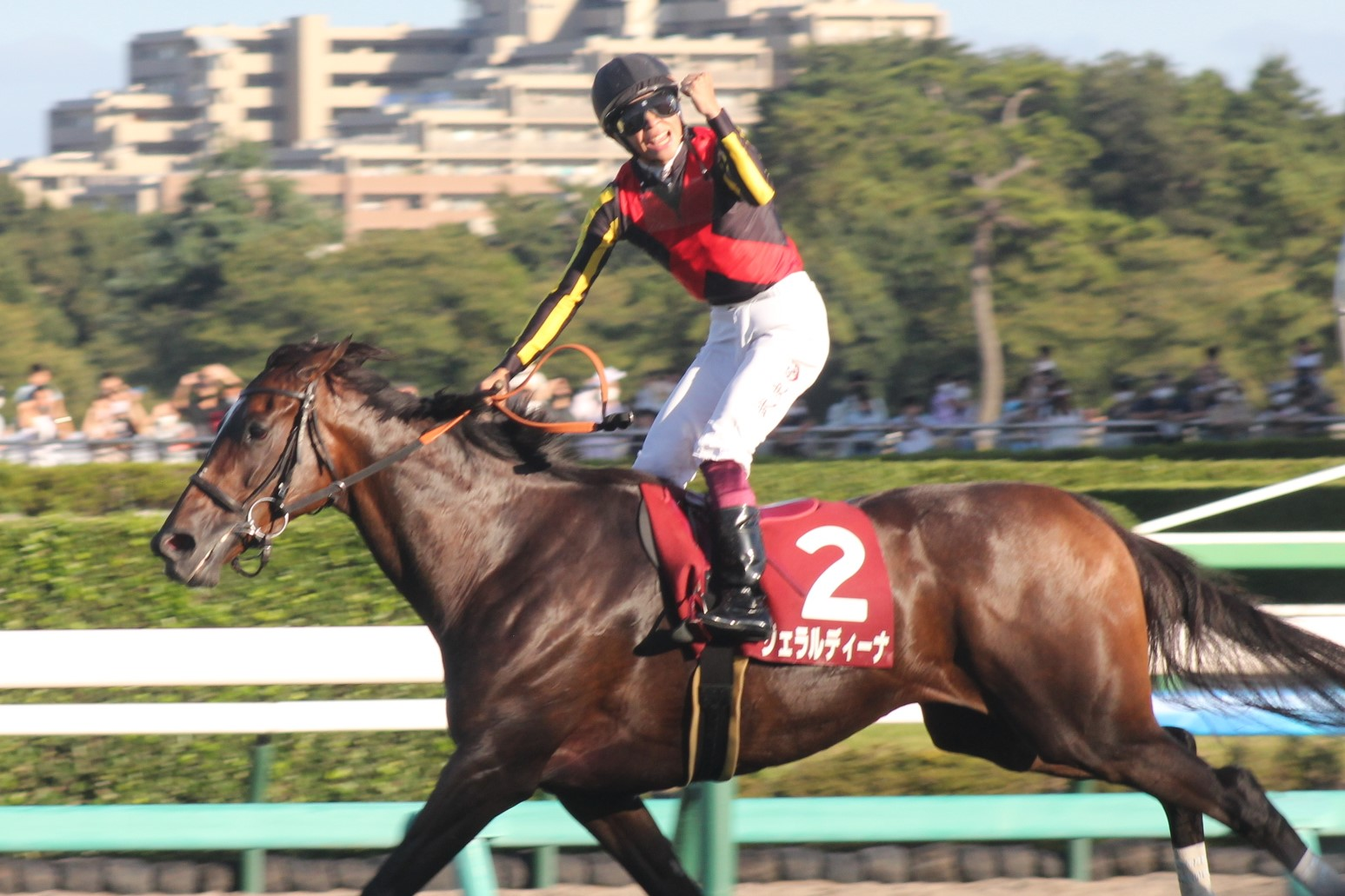
Sankei Sho All Comers

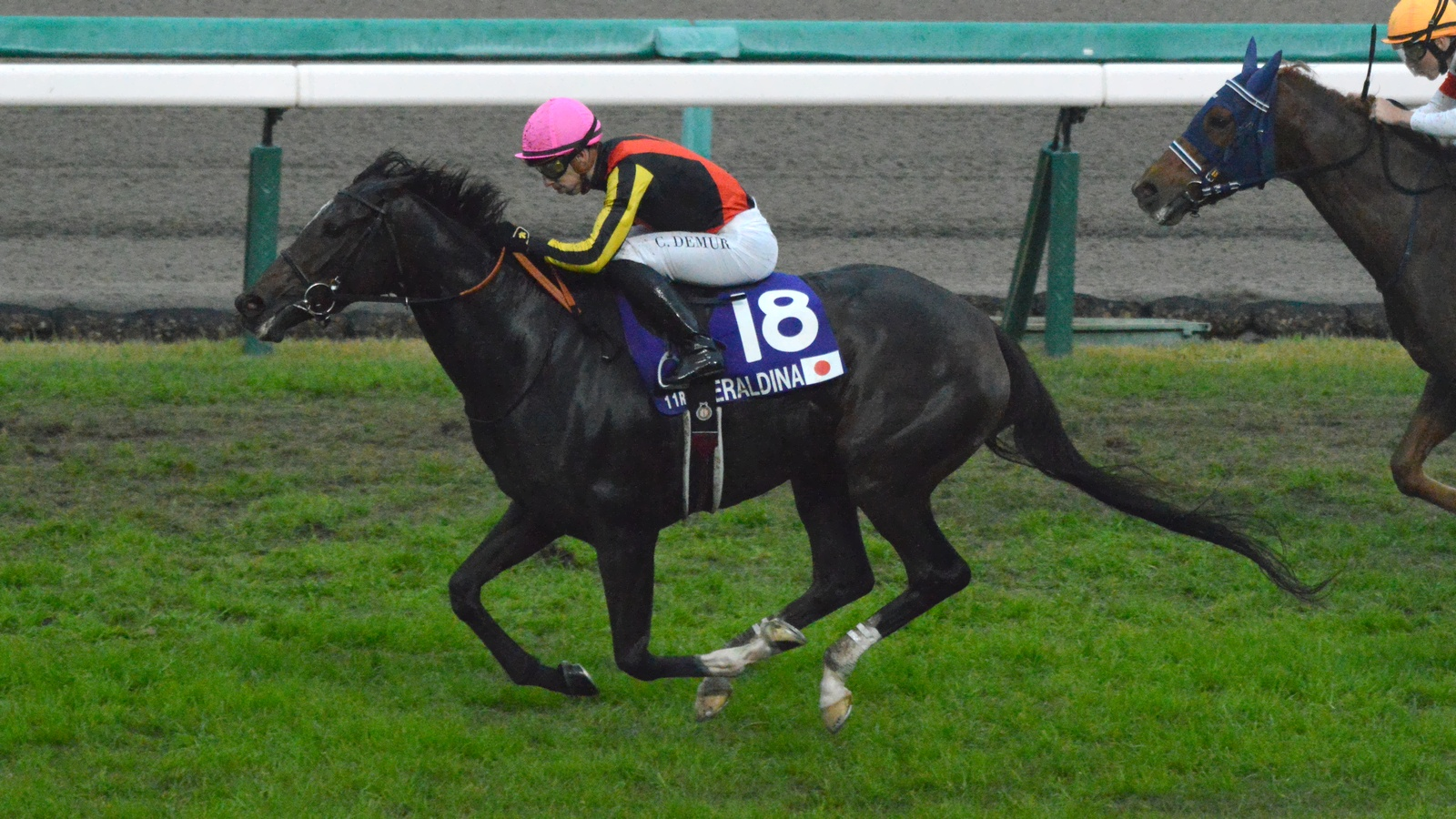
Queen Elizabeth II Cup

=== 2023: Five-year-old season ===
Geraldina started the season with the Osaka Hai. She trailed Stars on Earth for most of the race, placing herself in the rear of the pack, and tried to take the lead on the final stretch, but finished sixth behind Jack d'Or. Following this race, she was entered in to her first race abroad, the Queen Elizabeth II Cup at Sha Tin Racecourse, only to finish sixth there as well. After returning to Japan, she contested the 64th Takarazuka Kinen, but finished fourth behind Equinox.

After a Summer break, she was entered in to the All Comers to contest the race a second year in a row, but finished sixth. She was later also entered in to the Queen Elizabeth II Cup but couldn't win that race for a second year in a row either, finishing at 5th. On her last race, she returned to Hong Kong to run the Hong Kong Vase, but finished fourth behind Junko. Following this race, she was retired from racing to become a broodmare at Northern Farm.

== Racing statistics ==
The following racing form is based on information available in JBIS Search, netkeiba.com, and the Hong Kong Jockey Club.

Date	Track	Race	Grade	Distance (condition)	Entry	HN	Odds (Favored)	Finish	Time	Margins	Jockey	Winner (Runner-up)
2020 – two-year-old season
Sep 12	Chukyo	Debut Race		1600 m (Good)	16	1	4.4 (3)	3rd	1:35.8	0.3	Yasunari Iwata	Satono Luce
Oct 3	Chukyo	Maiden Race		1600 m (Firm)	10	8	3.7 (2)	2nd	1:34.5	0.2	Yasunari Iwata	Sparkle
Nov 23	Hanshin	Maiden Race		1800 m (Firm)	16	9	3.4 (2)	1st	1:46.7	-0.0	Yuichi Kitamura	(Toshin Mont Blanc)
Dec 13	Hanshin	Hanshin Juvenile Fillies	1	1600 m (Firm)	18	3	30.7 (8)	7th	1:33.6	0.5	Yasunari Iwata	Sodashi
2021 – three-year-old season
Feb 6	Chukyo	Elfin Stakes	L	1600 m (Firm)	12	4	5.7 (2)	10th	1:36.6	0.6	Yuichi Kitamura	Sulphur Cosmos
Jun 27	Hanshin	Shirosaki Tokubetsu	1-win	1800 m (Firm)	9	8	5.0 (4)	8th	1:49.4	3.5	Yuichi Fukunaga	Geofront
Jul 10	Kokura	Macau JCT	1-win	1800 m (Firm)	13	4	4.1 (2)	1st	1:45.3	-0.4	Yuichi Fukunaga	(Toshin Mont Blanc)
Sept 5	Kokura	Chikugogawa Tokubetsu	2-win	1800 m (Firm)	11	11	1.7 (1)	1st	1:47.8	-0.3	Yuichi Fukunaga	(Jun Blue Sky)
Oct 17	Hanshin	Nishinomiya Stakes	3-win	1800 m (Firm)	15	9	2.4 (1)	1st	1:46.1	-0.3	Yuichi Fukunaga	(Izu Jo no Kiseki)
Dec 4	Hanshin	Challenge Cup	3	2000 m (Firm)	11	1	3.9 (2)	4th	2:01.8	0.8	Yuichi Fukunaga	So Valiant
2022 – four-year-old season
Feb 13	Hanshin	Kyoto Kinen	2	2200 m (Good)	13	9	7.5 (4)	4th	2:12.2	0.3	Yuichi Fukunaga	African Gold
Apr 9	Hanshin	Hanshin Himba Stakes	2	1600 m (Firm)	11	9	4.0 (3)	6th	1:33.2	0.4	Hideaki Miyuki	Meisho Mimoza
Jun 4	Chukyo	Naruo Kinen	3	2000 m (Firm)	10	9	5.4 (4)	2nd	1:57.8	0.1	Yuichi Fukunaga	Weltreisende
Aug 14	Kokura	Kokura Kinen	3	2200 m (Firm)	15	4	3.2 (1)	3rd	1:58.2	0.8	Yuichi Fukunaga	Maria Elena
Sept 25	Nakayama	All Comers	2	2200 m (Firm)	13	2	19.5 (5)	1st	2:12.7	-0.2	Takeshi Yokoyama	(Robertson Quay)
Nov 13	Hanshin	Queen Elizabeth II Cup	1	2200 m (Soft)	18	18	8.1 (4)	1st	2:13.0	-0.3	Cristian Demuro	(Win Marilyn) (Lilac)
Dec 25	Nakayama	Arima Kinen	1	2500 m (Firm)	16	5	7.4 (3)	3rd	2:33.1	0.7	Cristian Demuro	Equinox
2023 – five-year-old season
Apr 2	Hanshin	Osaka Hai	1	2000 m (Firm)	16	1	8.5 (5)	6th	1:58.0	0.6	Mirai Iwata	Jack d'Or
Apr 30	Sha Tin	Queen Elizabeth II Cup	1	2000 m (Good)	7	7	8.2 (4)	6th	2:02.74	0.82	Cristian Demuro	Romantic Warrior
Jun 24	Hanshin	Takarazuka Kinen	1	2200 m (Firm)	17	11	13.8 (3)	4th	2:11.4	0.2	Yutaka Take	Equinox
Sept 24	Nakayama	All Comers	2	2200 m (Firm)	15	6	5.1 (3)	6th	2:12.5	0.5	Taisei Danno	Rousham Park
Nov 12	Kyoto	Queen Elizabeth II Cup	1	2200 m (Firm)	15	7	4.6 (2)	5th	2:12.9	0.3	Ryan Moore	Brede Weg
Dec 10	Sha Tin	Hong Kong Vase	1	2400 m (Good)	9	7	17.0 (5)	4th	2:30.73	0.61	William Buick	Junko

- The Hong Kong odds are based on those by the Hong Kong Jockey Club

== Pedigree ==
Pedigree of Geraldina, bay mare, 2018
Sire Maurice 2011 b.	Screen Hero; 2004 ch.	Grass Wonder	Silver Hawk
Sire Maurice 2011 b.	Screen Hero; 2004 ch.	Grass Wonder	Ameriflora
Sire Maurice 2011 b.	Screen Hero; 2004 ch.	Running Heroine	Sunday Silence
Sire Maurice 2011 b.	Screen Hero; 2004 ch.	Running Heroine	Dyna Actress
Sire Maurice 2011 b.	Mejiro Frances; 2001 b.	Carnegie	Sadler's Wells
Sire Maurice 2011 b.	Mejiro Frances; 2001 b.	Carnegie	Detroit
Sire Maurice 2011 b.	Mejiro Frances; 2001 b.	Mejiro Monterey	Mogami
Sire Maurice 2011 b.	Mejiro Frances; 2001 b.	Mejiro Monterey	Mejiro Quincey
Dam Gentildonna 2009 ch.	Deep Impact; 2002 b.	Sunday Silence	Halo
Dam Gentildonna 2009 ch.	Deep Impact; 2002 b.	Sunday Silence	Wishing Well
Dam Gentildonna 2009 ch.	Deep Impact; 2002 b.	Wind in Her Hair	Alzao
Dam Gentildonna 2009 ch.	Deep Impact; 2002 b.	Wind in Her Hair	Burghclere
Dam Gentildonna 2009 ch.	Donna Blini; 2003 ch.	Bertolini	Danzig
Dam Gentildonna 2009 ch.	Donna Blini; 2003 ch.	Bertolini	Aquilegia
Dam Gentildonna 2009 ch.	Donna Blini; 2003 ch.	Cal Norma's Lady	Lyphard's Special
Dam Gentildonna 2009 ch.	Donna Blini; 2003 ch.	Cal Norma's Lady	June Darling (Family: 16-f)

- Geraldina is inbred 4×3 to Sunday Silence, meaning that this horse appears both the fourth and third generations of this pedigree.
