= Potager (horse) =

Japanese Thoroughbred racehorse

Potager; ポタジェ
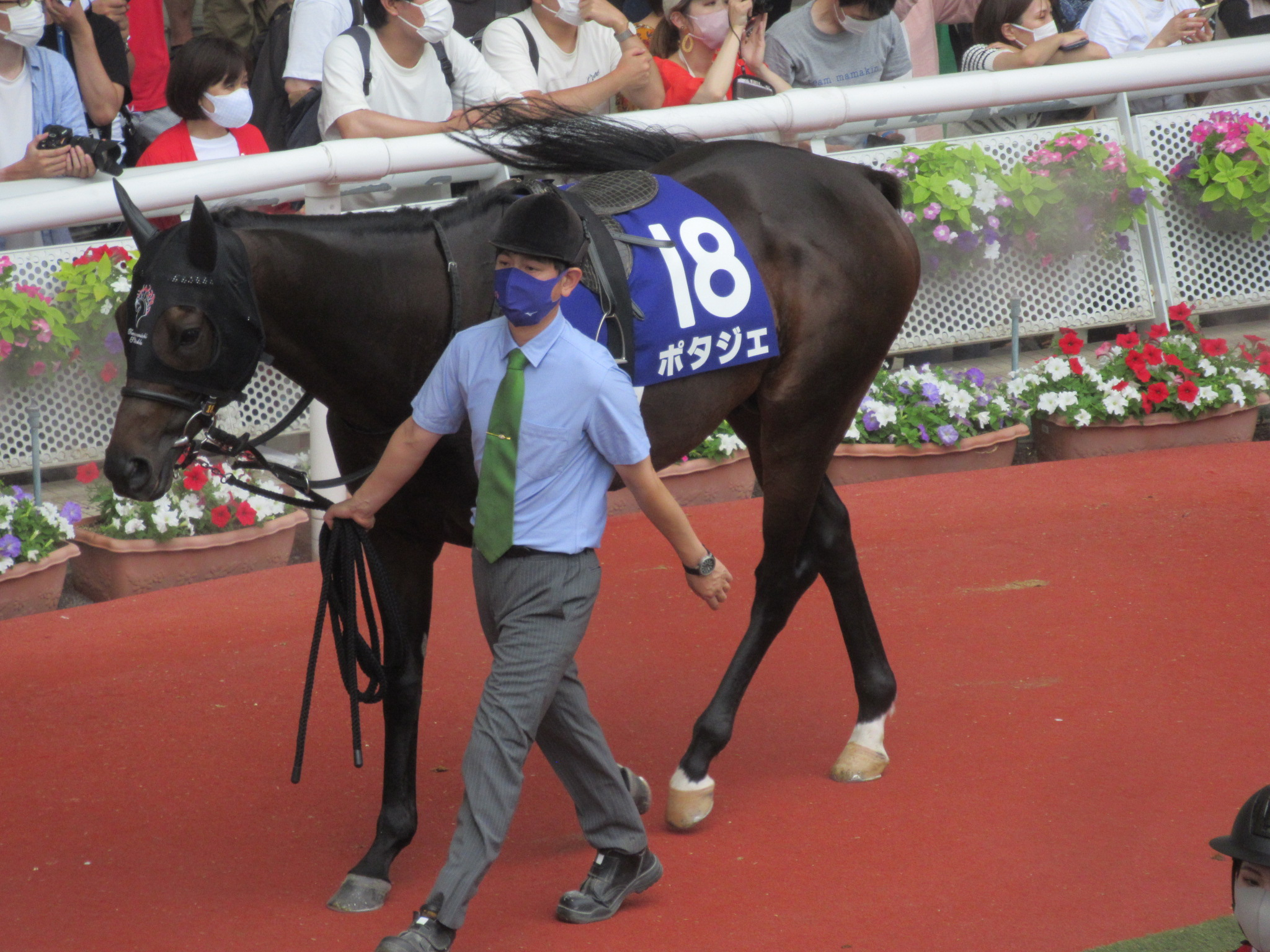
- Potager in June 2022
- Sire: Deep Impact
- Grandsire: Sunday Silence
- Dam: Ginger Punch
- Damsire: Awesome Again
- Sex: Stallion
- Foaled: 4 February 2017
- Country: Japan
- Colour: Bay
- Breeder: Northern Farm
- Owner: Kaneko Makoto Holdings
- Racing colours
- Trainer: Yasuo Tomomichi
- Jockey: Hayato Yoshida
- Record: 24: 6-4-2
- Earnings: ¥362,826,000

Major wins
- Shirafuji Stakes (2021); Osaka Hai (2022)

Potager (Japanese: ポタジェ foaled 4 February 2017) is a Japanese Thoroughbred racehorse. In his first two seasons he showed promise by winning four minor races but was not tested in the highest class. As a four-year-old in 2021 he won the Listed Shirafuji Stakes and was placed three times in Graded stakes races. He improved again in 2022 when he recorded an upset win in the Grade 1 Osaka Hai.

== Background ==
Potager is a dark bay horse with a faint white star and white pasterns on his hind feet bred in Japan by Northern Farm. In July 2018 he was entered in the JRA Sale of Yearlings and was bought for ¥205,200,000 by Makoto Kaneko. He was sent into training with Yasuo Tomomichi.

He was from the tenth crop of foals sired by Deep Impact, who was the Japanese Horse of the Year in 2005 and 2006, winning races including the Tokyo Yushun, Tenno Sho, Arima Kinen and Japan Cup. Deep Impact's other progeny include Gentildonna, Harp Star, Kizuna, A Shin Hikari, Snowfall and Saxon Warrior. Potager's dam Ginger Punch was a Florida-bred mare who was an outstanding performer in North America, winning 12 races including the Breeders' Cup Distaff and being voted American Champion Older Female Horse in 2007. As a female-line descendant of the British broodmare Dulcimer she was distantly related to Honeylight, Crepello, Twilight Alley and Attica Meli. She was exported to Japan at the end of her racing career where she also produced the Mainichi Okan winner Rouge Buck.

== Racing career ==
=== 2019: two-year-old season ===
On his racecourse debut Potager started the 0.3/1 favourite in a contest for previously unraced two-year-olds over 1800 metres on firm ground at Nakayama Racecourse on 29 September. Ridden by Yuga Kawada he settled towards the rear of the fourteen-runner field in the early stages before moving up on the outside on the final turn and took the lead 100 metres from the finish to win by a length. In November the colt started favourite for the Kigiku Sho over 2000 metres at Kyoto Racecourse but was beaten a nose into second place by Simple Game.

=== 2020: three-year-old season ===
Potager began his second season in the Listed Principal Stakes over 2000 metres at Tokyo Racecourse on 9 May when he was beaten a neck into second place by Bitterender. He ran second again in June, beaten one and three quarter lengths by Al Satwa when starting odds on favourite for a minor race over 2000 metres at Hanshin Racecourse. Over the same course and distance on 4 July Potager was matched against older horses in the Ikuta Tokubetsu on soft ground and started the 0.4/1 favourite. Ridden by Kawada he raced in third place before taking the lead early in the straight and repelled a sustained challenge from the five-year-old Peptide Orchid to win by one and a quarter lengths. The colt then started 0.9/1 favourite the Seibunikkan Sports Hai over 2000 metres at Kokura Racecourse on 15 August. With Kawada again in the saddle he settled behind the leaders before taking the lead on the final turn and kept on well to win by a length and a quarter from Blooming Sky. After a three-month break Potager returned to the track for the Kishiwada Stakes over 2000 metres at Hanshin on 14 November and went off at odds of 0.3/1 in a nine-runner field. After being settled in fourth place by Kawada he produced a sustained run on the outside in the straight, overhauled the front-running five-year-old Danon Majesty in the final strides and won by neck.

=== 2021: four-year-old season ===
On 30 January 2021, Potager began his third campaign with a step up in class for the Listed Shirafuji Stakes over 2000 metres at Tokyo where he was ridden by Kawada and started the 1/1 favourite. He raced just behind the leaders as Atomic Force set the pace but lost his position approaching the final turn. He began to make good progress in the straight, gained the advantage in the last 100 metres and prevailed in a tight finish, beating the fast-finishing Sanrei Pocket by a neck with Franz and African Gold close behind in third and fourth. For the rest of the season, Potager was campaigned in Graded stakes races and ran consistently well although he failed to record another win. In the Grade 2 Kinko Sho at Chukyo in March he finished a close third behind Gibeon and Daring Tact with Glory Vase in third. In May he started favourite for the Grade 3 Niigata Daishoten but was beaten a neck into second by Sanrei Pocket.

After a summer break Potager returned for the Grade 2 Mainichi Okan over 1800 metres at Tokyo on 10 October and came home third behind Schnell Meister and Danon Kingly beaten a head and one and a half lengths by the first two. Three weeks later the colt was stepped up to Grade 1 class for the autumn edition of the Tenno Sho and started at odds of 22.3/1. He tracked the leaders for most of the way before being outpaced in the closing stages and finished sixth behind Efforia, beaten five lengths by the winner.

=== 2022: five-year-old season ===
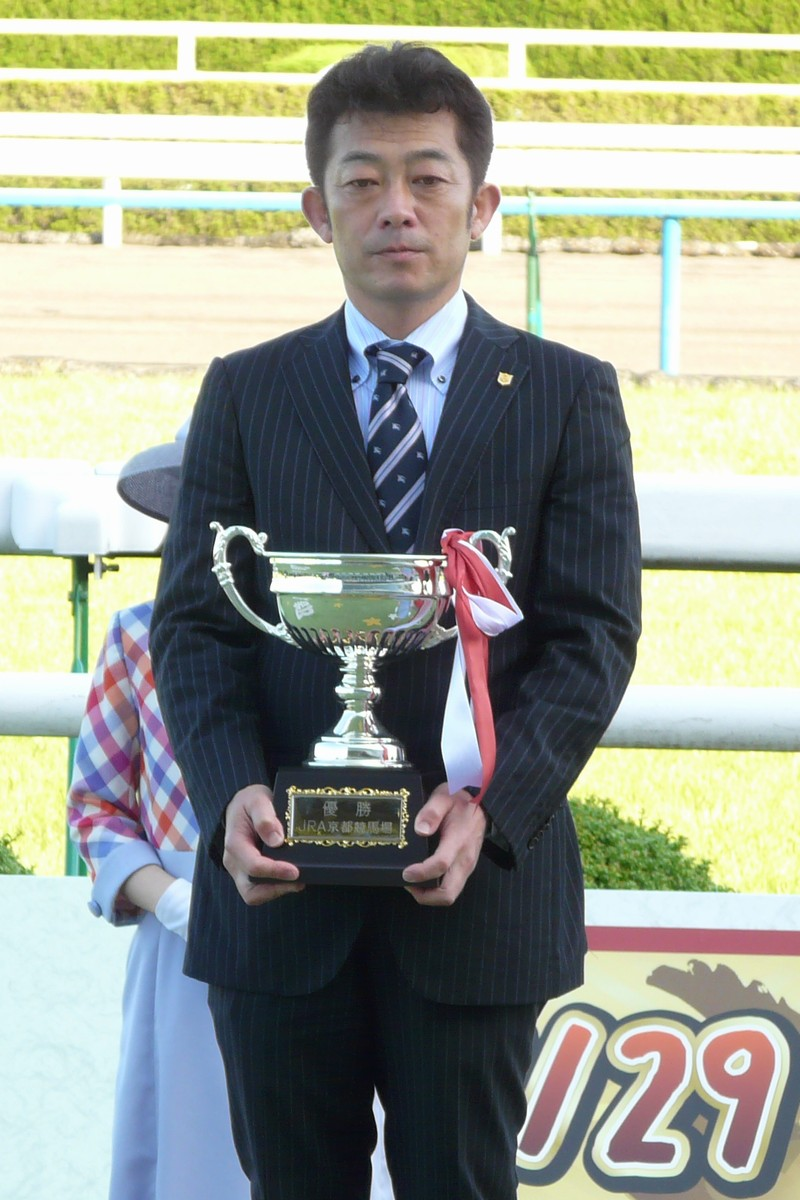
Potager's trainer Yasuo Tomomichi

Potager began his fourth season on 23 January when he finished fifth to King of Koji in the Grade 2 American Jockey Club Cup at Nakayama, beaten just over two lengths by the winner. In March at Chukyo he produced another respectable effort in defeat as he came home fourth behind Jack d'Or in Kinko Sho. Hayato Yoshida took the ride when Potager returned to Grade 1 class for the Osaka Hai over 2000 metres at Hanshin on 3 April and started a 58/1 outsider in a sixteen-runner field. Efforia started favourite while the other contenders included Lei Papale, Akai Ito, Makahiki, Jack d'Or and King of Koji. Potager settled in fifth place as Jack d'Or set the pace, before moving up on the final turn and making a sustained run in the straight. Lei Papale went to the front 200 metres from the finish but Potager maintained his progress, gained the advantage in the final strides and won by a neck from Arrivo, with Lei Papale a nose away in third place. After the race Yoshida commented "Potager adapts well to various race developments and he was terrific in that he was able to keep up with the pace of the other really strong horses in front. He really gave his all in the end and all I could do was keep urging him on so I’m happy that we were able to win."

Potager was off the track until 26 June when he started at odds of 21.9/1 for the 2200 metre Takarazuka Kinen at Hanshin. He raced in mid-division for most of the way but failed to make any progress in the straight and came home eleventh of the seventeen runners behind Titleholder. Potager then rested until autumn and would return for the Mainichi Okan and Tenno Sho (Autumn). In the Mainichi Okan, he started well throughout the race even with 58 kg handicap weight being added but failed to accelerate in the final straight and finished in sixth place. For the Autumn Tenno Sho, he was unable to contend and stay mostly at eleventh place, ended up in 13th-place in the end. He was selected for the end of season Arima Kinen too which he ended up 12th-place after failing to accelerate at the final turn to move up from the middle pack.

=== 2023: six-year-old season ===
He raced in the Kinko Sho for as the season opener. Under Mirai Iwata, he managed to ride him well but the weight difference caused his legs to give up early and he came home in sixth place. Next, he aimed for the title defence in the Osaka Hai. He ran around the fifth place during the race but fallen back on last stint to finish tenth. He aimed for the Sapporo Kinen for his next race but he had to withdraw and was rested until autumn due to poor physical condition. His rest eventually lasting for the next two season.

=== 2025: eight-year-old season ===
Potager returned to racing for the first time in 1 year and 9 months at the American Jockey Club Cup on January 26, 2025. He held third place early in the race, but was overtaken by horses behind him after the third corner, finishing in a disastrous 15th-place. He tried on two dirt race after this which were the Kawasaki Kinen and Kashiwa Kinen. He finished in tenth on the former but failed to finish on the later. After the race in the Kashiwa Kinen, he was diagnosed with a limp in his right foreleg. The injury eventually forced him to retire instantly and his registration was terminated on May 21. He was assigned to the East Stud in Urakawa, Hokkaido for the stud duty.

== Racing form ==
Potager won six races out of 24 starts. This data available is based on JBIS and netkeiba.

Date	Track	Race	Grade	Distance (Condition)	Entry	HN	Odds (Favored)	Finish	Time	Margins	Jockey	Winner (Runner-up)
2019 – two-year-old season
Sep 29	Nakayama	2YO debut		1800m（Firm）	14	10	1.3（1）	1st	1:50.1	−0.2	Yuga Kawada	(Harem Shadow)
Nov 10	Kyoto	Kigiku Sho	1W	2000m（Firm）	10	8	3.0（1）	2nd	2:02.1	0.0	Christophe Soumillon	Simple Game
2020 – three-year-old season
May 9	Tokyo	Principal Stakes	L	2000m（Firm）	11	2	5.4（3）	2nd	1:59.8	0.0	Yutaka Take	Bitterender
Jun 7	Hanshin	3YO allowance	1W	2000m（Firm）	9	6	1.4（1）	2nd	2:00.6	0.0	Yutaka Take	Al Satwa
Jul 4	Hanshin	Ikuta Tokubetsu	1W	2000m（Soft）	10	6	1.4（1）	1st	2:03.2	–0.2	Yuga Kawada	(Peptide Orchid)
Aug 15	Kokura	Seibunikkan Sports Hai	2W	2000m（Firm）	10	7	1.9（1）	1st	1:57.8	–0.2	Yuga Kawada	(Blooming Sky)
Nov 14	Hanshin	Kishiwada Stakes	3W	2000m（Firm）	9	3	1.3（1）	1st	1:58.4	0.0	Yuga Kawada	(Danon Majesty)
2021 – four-year-old season
Jan 30	Tokyo	Shirafuji Stakes	L	2000m（Firm）	13	6	2.0（1）	1st	1:59.0	–0.1	Yuga Kawada	(Sanrei Pocket)
Mar 14	Chukyo	Kinko Sho	2	2000m（Soft）	10	10	19.8（6）	3rd	2:01.9	0.1	Yuichi Kitamura	Gibeon
May 9	Niigata	Niigata Daishoten	3	2000m（Firm）	14	10	3.5（1）	2nd	1:59.3	0.0	Atsuya Nishimura	Sanrei Pocket
Oct 10	Tokyo	Mainichi Okan	2	1800m（Firm）	13	5	8.7（4）	3rd	1:45.0	0.2	Hayato Yoshida	Schnell Meister
Oct 31	Tokyo	Tenno Sho (Autumn)	1	2000m（Firm）	16	4	23.3（5）	6th	1:58.7	0.8	Yuga Kawada	Efforia
2022 – five-year-old season
Jan 23	Nakayama	American Jockey Club Cup	2	2200m（Firm）	14	6	3.6（2）	5th	2:13.1	0.4	Yuga Kawada	King of Koji
Mar 13	Chukyo	Kinko Sho	2	2000m（Firm）	13	5	8.7（4）	4th	1:58.0	0.8	Hayato Yoshida	Jack d'Or
Apr 3	Hanshin	Osaka Hai	1	2000m（Firm）	16	8	58.7（8）	1st	1:58.4	–0.1	Hayato Yoshida	(Lei Papale)
Jun 26	Hanshin	Takarazuka Kinen	1	2200m（Firm）	17	18	22.9（8）	11th	2:11.5	1.8	Hayato Yoshida	Titleholder
Oct 9	Tokyo	Mainichi Okan	2	1800m（Firm）	10	6	12.9（7）	6th	1:44.6	0.5	Hayato Yoshida	Salios
Oct 30	Tokyo	Tenno Sho (Autumn)	1	2000m（Firm）	15	4	34.6（8）	13th	1:58.4	0.9	Hayato Yoshida	Equinox
Dec 25	Nakayama	Arima Kinen	1	2500m（Firm）	16	12	136.9（12）	12th	2:34.5	2.1	Hayato Yoshida	Equinox
2023 – six-year-old season
Mar 12	Chukyo	Kinko Sho	2	2000m（Firm）	12	9	24.6（7）	6th	2:00.4	0.6	Mirai Iwata	Prognosis
Apr 2	Hanshin	Osaka Hai	1	2000m（Firm）	16	10	48.5（12）	10th	1:58.1	0.7	Ryusei Sakai	Jack d'Or
2025 – eight-year-old season
Jan 26	Nakayama	American Jockey Club Cup	2	2200m（Firm）	18	3	142.2（14）	15th	2:13.7	1.6	Mirai Iwata	Danon Decile
Apr 9	Kawasaki	Kawasaki Kinen	Jpn1	2100m（Firm）	13	5	44.8（7）	10th	2:20.8	2.8	Mirai Iwata	Meisho Hario
May 5	Funabashi	Kashiwa Kinen	Jpn1	1600m（Fast）	10	9	84.8（6）	DNF	–	–	Mirai Iwata	Shamal

Legend:
Turf Dirt

- The Jpn graded race were labeled as "Listed" in international level.

== Pedigree ==
Pedigree of Potager (JPN), bay colt, 2017
Sire Deep Impact (JPN) 2002	Sunday Silence (USA); 1986	Halo	Hail to Reason
Sire Deep Impact (JPN) 2002	Sunday Silence (USA); 1986	Halo	Cosmah
Sire Deep Impact (JPN) 2002	Sunday Silence (USA); 1986	Wishing Well	Understanding
Sire Deep Impact (JPN) 2002	Sunday Silence (USA); 1986	Wishing Well	Mountain Flower
Sire Deep Impact (JPN) 2002	Wind in Her Hair (IRE); 1991	Alzao (USA)	Lyphard
Sire Deep Impact (JPN) 2002	Wind in Her Hair (IRE); 1991	Alzao (USA)	Lady Rebecca (GB)
Sire Deep Impact (JPN) 2002	Wind in Her Hair (IRE); 1991	Burghclere (GB)	Busted
Sire Deep Impact (JPN) 2002	Wind in Her Hair (IRE); 1991	Burghclere (GB)	Highclere
Dam Ginger Punch (USA) 2003	Awesome Again (CAN); 1994	Deputy Minister	Vice Regent
Dam Ginger Punch (USA) 2003	Awesome Again (CAN); 1994	Deputy Minister	Mint Copy
Dam Ginger Punch (USA) 2003	Awesome Again (CAN); 1994	Primal Force (USA)	Blushing Groom (FR)
Dam Ginger Punch (USA) 2003	Awesome Again (CAN); 1994	Primal Force (USA)	Prime Prospect
Dam Ginger Punch (USA) 2003	Nappelon (USA); 1992	Bold Revenue	Bold Ruckus (USA)
Dam Ginger Punch (USA) 2003	Nappelon (USA); 1992	Bold Revenue	More Revenue (USA)
Dam Ginger Punch (USA) 2003	Nappelon (USA); 1992	Sally Go Gray (USA)	Wise Exchange
Dam Ginger Punch (USA) 2003	Nappelon (USA); 1992	Sally Go Gray (USA)	Surreptitious (Family: 16-d)
