= Sodashi =

Japanese Thoroughbred racehorse

Sodashi ソダシ
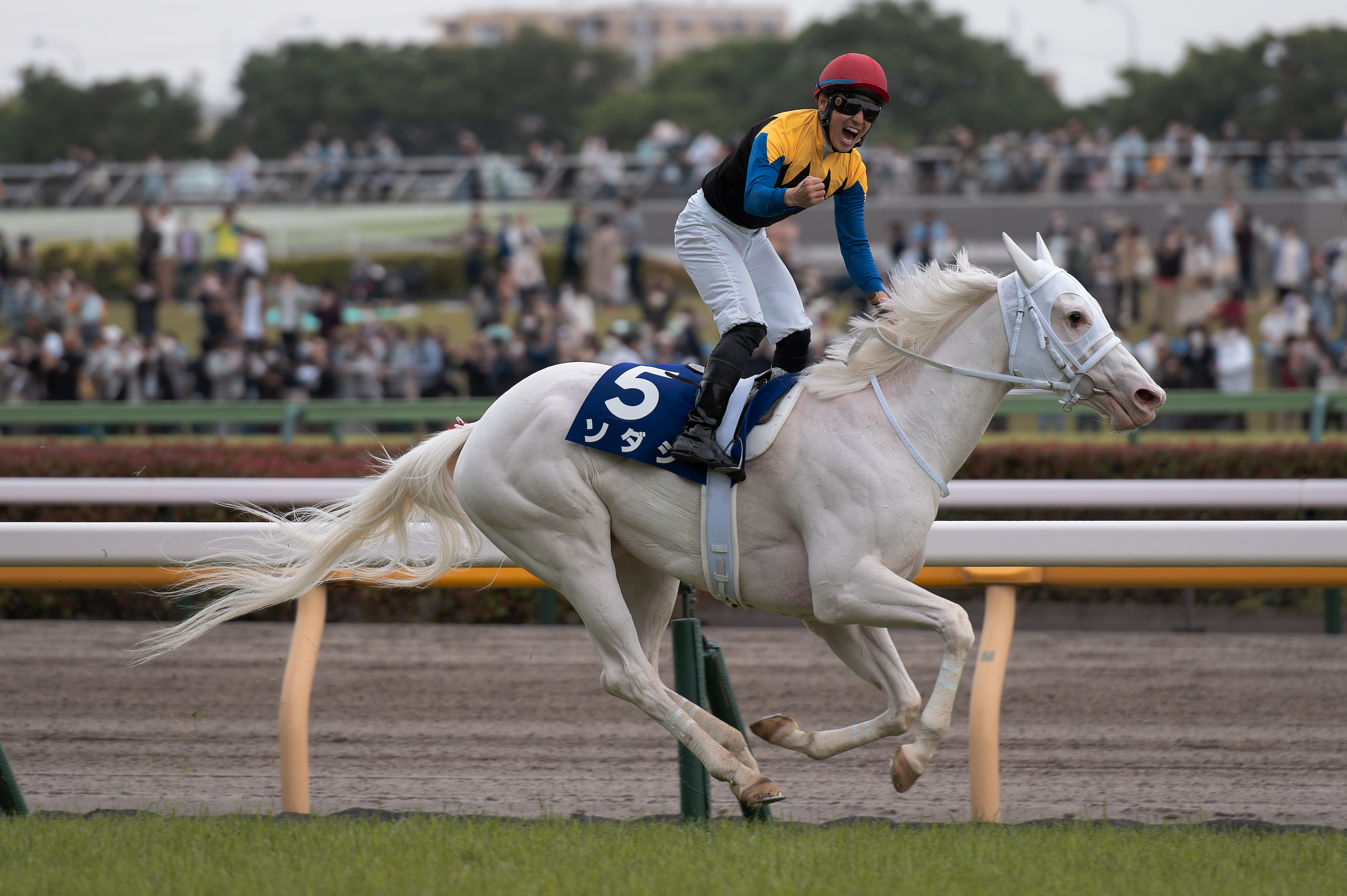
- Sodashi and her jockey, Hayato Yoshida, after winning the Victoria Mile in 2022
- Breed: Thoroughbred
- Sire: Kurofune
- Grandsire: French Deputy
- Dam: Buchiko
- Damsire: King Kamehameha
- Sex: Mare
- Foaled: 8 March 2018 (age 8)
- Country: Japan
- Colour: White
- Breeder: Northern Farm
- Owner: Kaneko Makoto Holdings
- Racing colours
- Trainer: Naosuke Sugai
- Jockey: Hayato Yoshida
- Record: 16: 7-2-2
- Earnings: 629,234,000 JPY

Major wins
- Sapporo Nisai Stakes (2020); Artemis Stakes (2020); Hanshin Juvenile Fillies (2020); Sapporo Kinen (2021); Victoria Mile (2022); Japanese Classic Tiara Race wins: Oka Sho (2021)

Awards
- JRA Award for Best Two-Year-Old Filly (2020); JRA Award for Best Three-Year-Old Filly (2021)

Sodashi (Japanese: ソダシ, Hepburn: Sodashi; foaled 8 March 2018) is a pure white Japanese Thoroughbred racehorse. She was one of the best two-year-olds in Japan in 2020 when she was unbeaten in four races, including the Sapporo Nisai Stakes, the Artemis Stakes and the Hanshin Juvenile Fillies. In 2021, she won the Oka Sho but sustained her first defeat when running unplaced in the Yushun Himba. The filly returned to the track in August and defeated older rivals in the Sapporo Kinen.

== Background ==
Sodashi is a pure white mare bred in Japan by Northern Farm, the breeding operation of her owner Makoto Kaneko. She was sent into training with Naosuke Sugai.

She was from the seventeenth crop of foals sired by Kurofune, an American-bred stallion who won the NHK Mile Cup and the Japan Cup Dirt in 2001. As a breeding stallion, his other progeny have included Curren Chan, Clarity Sky (NHK Mile Cup), Sleepless Night (Sprinters Stakes), Fusaichi Richard (Asahi Hai Futurity Stakes) and Whale Capture (Victoria Mile).

Sodashi's maternal grand-dam Shirayukihime(meaning "Snow White Princess") was a rare white Thoroughbred foaled in 1996 to non-white parents. Her other descendants (many of whom have also been white) have included Hayayakko (Leopard Stakes) and Meikei Yell (Kokura Nisai Stakes, Fantasy Stakes). Sodashi's dam Buchiko, who won four races, was a white mare with an unusual pattern of dark patches and spots on her coat. Shirayukihime herself was a female-line descendant of the Italian broodmare Milonga (foaled in 1948) making her a distant relative of Hansel.

== Racing career ==
=== 2020: two-year-old season ===
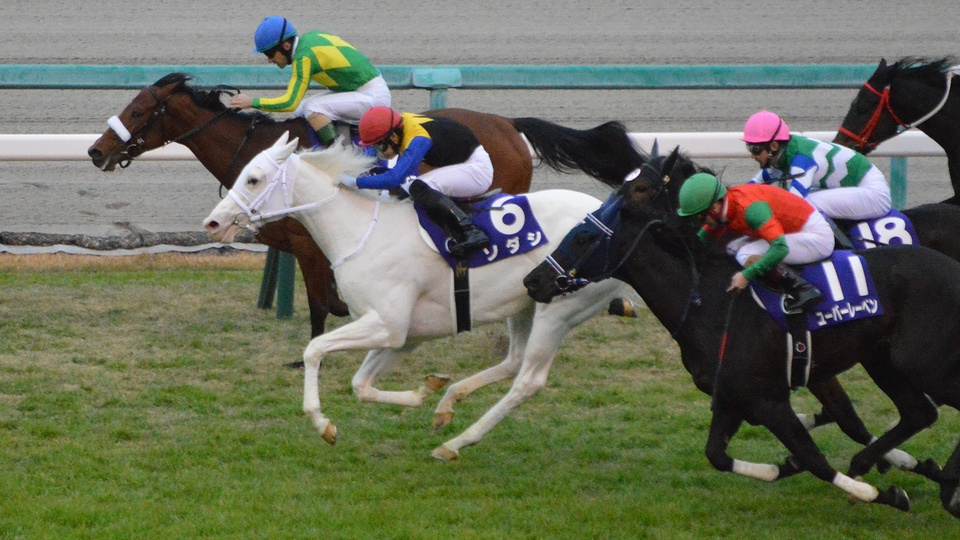
Sodashi and Uberleben at the Hanshin Juvenile Fillies

Sodashi was ridden in all of her starts as a two-year-old by Hayato Yoshida. The filly made her debut in an event for previously unraced juveniles over 1800 metres on firm ground at Hakodate Racecourse on 12 July and won by two and a half lengths from the colt Gallant Warrior.

On September 5, Sodashi was stepped up in class for the Grade 3 Sapporo Nisai Stakes over the same distance at Sapporo Racecourse and started the 3.7/1 second favourite in a fourteen-runner field. After tracking the leaders she gained the advantage in the straight and won by a neck from Uberleben with a gap of a length and three quarters back to the favourite Bathrat Leon.

On her next appearance Sodashi started the 2.5/1 favourite for the Grade 3 Artemis Stakes over 1600 metres at Tokyo Racecourse on 31 October. She raced in second place behind the front-running outsider Orange Fizz before taking the lead in the straight, breaking clear of the field and winning by one and three quarter lengths and half a length from Kukuna and Ten Happy Rose.

On 10 December Sodashi was moved up to the highest class to contest the Grade 1 Hanshin Juvenile Fillies over 1600 metres at Hanshin Racecourse and went off the 2.2/1 favourite against seventeen opponents including Satono Reinas (Saffron Sho), Meikei Yell (Kokura Nisai Stakes, Fantasy Stakes), Infinite (second in the Saudi Arabia Royal Cup), and Uberleben. In the build up to the race, Hayato Yoshida said "[White horses] are all very sensitive and high maintenance. You do need to be careful with them but with her, that sensitive side is bringing out the best in her. She breaks well and is super responsive when you tell her to go. She's really smart and a very complete racehorse." The filly settled in fourth place on the inside as the outsider Yoka Yoka set the early pace. After looking to be unlikely to obtain a clear run in the straight, she went to the front inside the last 200 metres and held off the late challenges of Satono Reinas and Uberleben to win by a nose and a neck, becoming the first white Japanese horse to win a graded turf race. Yoshida commented "Going into the race as favorite was a bit of a load, but I'm thrilled with the outcome. She hated to even go near the gate but I'm relieved that all went well and that we were able to be positioned just as I hoped. The going affected her good turn of foot but she gave all she had. There is room for improvement, and I hope we can get her ready for next year's classics."

In January 2021, Sodashi was unanimously voted Japan's Best Two-Year-Old Filly at the JRA Awards for 2020. In the official Japanese rankings Sodashi was rated the best two-year-old filly of 2020, one pound ahead of Satono Reinas.

=== 2021: three-year-old season ===
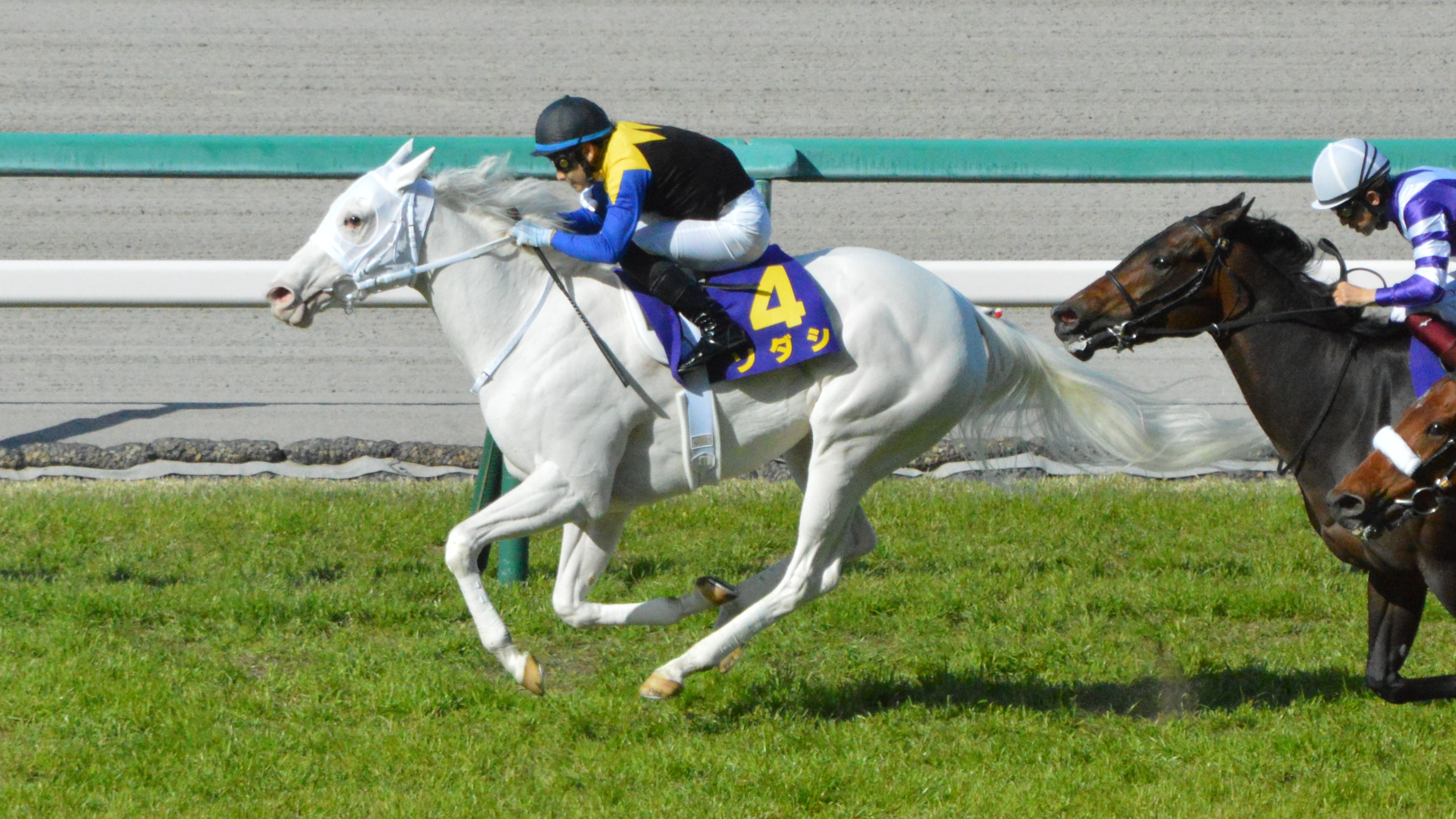
Sodashi winning the Oka Sho

Sodashi made her first start of 2021 in the first leg of the Japanese Fillies Triple Crown, the Japanese 1000 Guineas, where she won by a neck over Satono Reinas, setting a new record time of 1:31.1 in the process and officially beating Gran Alegria's previous record. She developed from being "that white filly" to genuine stardom. She suffered her first defeat when she finished eighth out of eighteen runners in the 2021 Japanese Oaks, the second leg of the fillies' Triple Crown. She would then go on to win the Sapporo Kinen over open company before closing out her season with a tenth-place finish in the Shūka Sho (in which the horse broke her tooth and was bleeding) and a twelfth-place finish in the Champions Cup.

=== 2022: four-year-old season ===
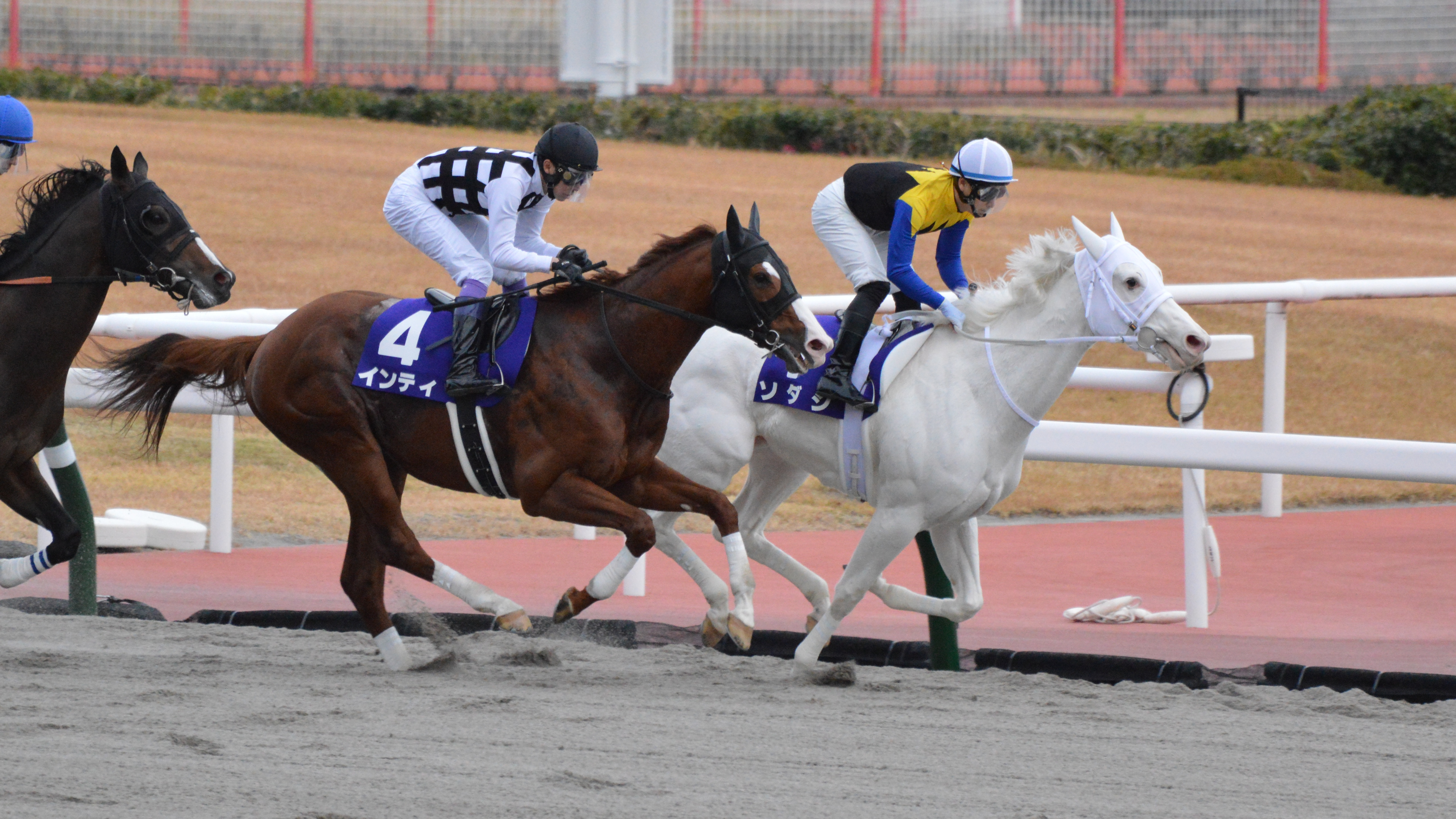
Sodashi at the Champions Cup

After a third-place finish in the February Stakes over the dirt, Sodashi was entered in the Grade 1 Victoria Mile on the turf against fillies and mares. After settling in fourth position for most of the trip, Sodashi stormed to the lead and to victory in the uphill stretch at Tokyo Racecourse under regular jockey Hayato Yoshida.

After this, she went to Sapporo with the anticipation that she would win the Sapporo Kinen for a second year in a row. As Hayayakko, another white horse, was also entered in to the race, this became the first time ever that two white horses were matched together in a JRA race. However, neither horse won the title with Sodashi finishing 5th and Hayayakko 10th behind Jack d'Or. Sugai deduced that the reason for the loss was due to her weight was increased by 3kg, and announced that she would go to the Mile Championship next.

Before the Mile Championship, she also ran in the Fuchu Himba Stakes, where she was the most favored by far. She took the lead after placing herself at fifth place for most of the race, but was passed by the dark-horse Izu Jo no Kiseki right before the finish line.

At the Mile Championship, she was the second most favored to win behind Schnell Meister. She was placed at fourth place among the slow pack during the race, and attempted to take the lead as fast as possible on the straight, but was passed by Serifos from the outside, as well as Danon The Kid from the inside, marking her first defeat at a mile race.

=== 2023: five-year-old season ===
Sodashi started her 2023 run with the Victoria Mile on May 14, where she took the lead towards the end, but was passed by Songline soon after and finished second. She then went on to the Yasuda Kinen, but lost to Songline once again and finished at 7th place.

Sodashi developed problems on her legs and was sent to rest at one of the Northern Farm stables. However, it was ultimately decided by Kaneko on October 1 that he would be retiring the horse, saying that he would "pass the baton" to Sodashi's full sister, Mama Cocha, who had just won the Sprinters Stakes that same day.

== Racing form ==
Sodashi won seven races out of 16 starts. This data is available in JBIS and netkeiba.

Date	Distance (Condition)	Race	Class	Course	Field	HN	Odds (Favourite)	Finish	Time	Winning (Losing) Margin	Jockey	Winner (2nd Place)	Ref
2020 – two-year-old season
Jul 12	Turf 1,800 m (Firm)	Two Year Old Debut		Hakodate	7	4	5.9 (3)	1st	1:50.4	2 1/2 lengths	Hayato Yoshida	(Gallant Warrior)	
Sep 5	Turf 1,800 m (Firm)	Sapporo Nisai Stakes	GIII	Sapporo	14	13	4.7 (2)	1st	R1:48.2	neck	Hayato Yoshida	(Uberleben)	
Oct 31	Turf 1,600 m (Firm)	Artemis Stakes	GIII	Tokyo	16	14	3.5 (1)	1st	1:34.9	1 3/4 lengths	Hayato Yoshida	(Kukuna)	
Dec 13	Turf 1,600 m (Firm)	Hanshin Juvenile Fillies	GI	Hanshin	18	6	3.2 (1)	1st	1:33.1	nose	Hayato Yoshida	(Satono Reinas)	
2021 – three-year-old season
Apr 11	Turf 1,600 m (Firm)	Oka Sho	GI	Hanshin	18	4	3.6 (2)	1st	R1:31.1	neck	Hayato Yoshida	(Satono Reinas)	
May 23	Turf 2,400 m (Firm)	Yushun Himba	GI	Tokyo	18	11	1.9 (1)	8th	2:25.1	(4 1/4 lengths)	Hayato Yoshida	Uberleben	
Aug 22	Turf 2,000 m (Firm)	Sapporo Kinen	GII	Sapporo	13	13	3.8 (2)	1st	1:59.5	3/4 length	Hayato Yoshida	(Loves Only You)	
Oct 17	Turf 2,000 m (Firm)	Shuka Sho	GI	Hanshin	16	4	1.9 (1)	10th	2:02.1	(5 lengths)	Hayato Yoshida	Akaitorino Musume	
Dec 5	Dirt 1,800 m (Fast)	Champions Cup	GI	Chukyo	16	1	4.5 (2)	12th	1:52.0	(14 1/2 lengths)	Hayato Yoshida	T O Keynes	
2022 – four-year-old season
Feb 20	Dirt 1,600 m (Sloppy)	February Stakes	GI	Tokyo	16	11	8.2 (4)	3rd	1:34.3	(3 lengths)	Hayato Yoshida	Cafe Pharoah	
May 15	Turf 1,600 m (Firm)	Victoria Mile	GI	Tokyo	18	5	5.7 (4)	1st	1:32.2	2 lengths	Hayato Yoshida	(Fine Rouge)	
Aug 21	Turf 2,000 m (Firm)	Sapporo Kinen	GII	Sapporo	16	10	3.3 (1)	5th	2:01.8	(3 3/4 lengths)	Hayato Yoshida	Jack d'Or	
Oct 15	Turf 1,800 m (Firm)	Fuchu Himba Stakes	GII	Tokyo	15	2	1.9 (1)	2nd	1:44.5	(head)	Hayato Yoshida	Izu Jo No Kiseki	
Nov 20	Turf 1,600 m (Firm)	Mile Championship	GI	Hanshin	17	6	4.4 (2)	3rd	1:32.8	(1 3/4 lengths)	Hayato Yoshida	Serifos	
2023 – five-year-old season
May 14	Turf 1,600 m (Firm)	Victoria Mile	GI	Tokyo	16	16	4.6 (3)	2nd	1:32.2	(head)	Damian Lane	Songline	
Jun 4	Turf 1,600 m (Firm)	Yasuda Kinen	GI	Tokyo	18	5	5.5 (2)	7th	1:32.0	(4 lengths)	Yuga Kawada	Songline	

- R in the chart and the time written in red indicates the horse finished in record time.

== Broodmare career ==
Sodashi retired to Northern Farm as a broodmare. On January 30, 2025 she delivered her first foal, a filly by two-time Japanese Horse of the Year Equinox.

=== Breeding record ===
c = colt, f = filly

No.	Name	Year	Sex	Color	Sire	Wins	Races	Remarks
1st	(Sodashi 2025)	2025	f	Dark Bay	Equinox			
2nd	(Sodashi 2026)	2026	c	Bay	Equinox			

== Pedigree ==
Pedigree of Sodashi (JPN), white filly, 2018
Sire Kurofune (USA) 1998	French Deputy (USA); 1992	Deputy Minister (CAN)	Vice Regent (CAN)
Sire Kurofune (USA) 1998	French Deputy (USA); 1992	Deputy Minister (CAN)	Mint Copy (CAN)
Sire Kurofune (USA) 1998	French Deputy (USA); 1992	Mitterand (USA)	Hold Your Peace (USA)
Sire Kurofune (USA) 1998	French Deputy (USA); 1992	Mitterand (USA)	Laredo Lass (USA)
Sire Kurofune (USA) 1998	Blue Avenue (USA); 1990	Classic Go Go (USA)	Pago Pago (AUS)
Sire Kurofune (USA) 1998	Blue Avenue (USA); 1990	Classic Go Go (USA)	Classic Perfection (USA)
Sire Kurofune (USA) 1998	Blue Avenue (USA); 1990	Eliza Blue (USA)	Icecapade(USA)
Sire Kurofune (USA) 1998	Blue Avenue (USA); 1990	Eliza Blue (USA)	Corella (USA)
Dam Buchiko (JPN) 2012	King Kamehameha (JPN); 2001	Kingmambo (USA)	Mr Prospector
Dam Buchiko (JPN) 2012	King Kamehameha (JPN); 2001	Kingmambo (USA)	Miesque
Dam Buchiko (JPN) 2012	King Kamehameha (JPN); 2001	Manfath (IRE)	Last Tycoon
Dam Buchiko (JPN) 2012	King Kamehameha (JPN); 2001	Manfath (IRE)	Pilot Bird (GB)
Dam Buchiko (JPN) 2012	Shirayukihime (JPN); 1996	Sunday Silence (USA)	Halo
Dam Buchiko (JPN) 2012	Shirayukihime (JPN); 1996	Sunday Silence (USA)	Wishing Well
Dam Buchiko (JPN) 2012	Shirayukihime (JPN); 1996	Wave Wind (USA)	Topsider
Dam Buchiko (JPN) 2012	Shirayukihime (JPN); 1996	Wave Wind (USA)	Storm And Sunshine (Family:2-w)
