= Kinko Sho =

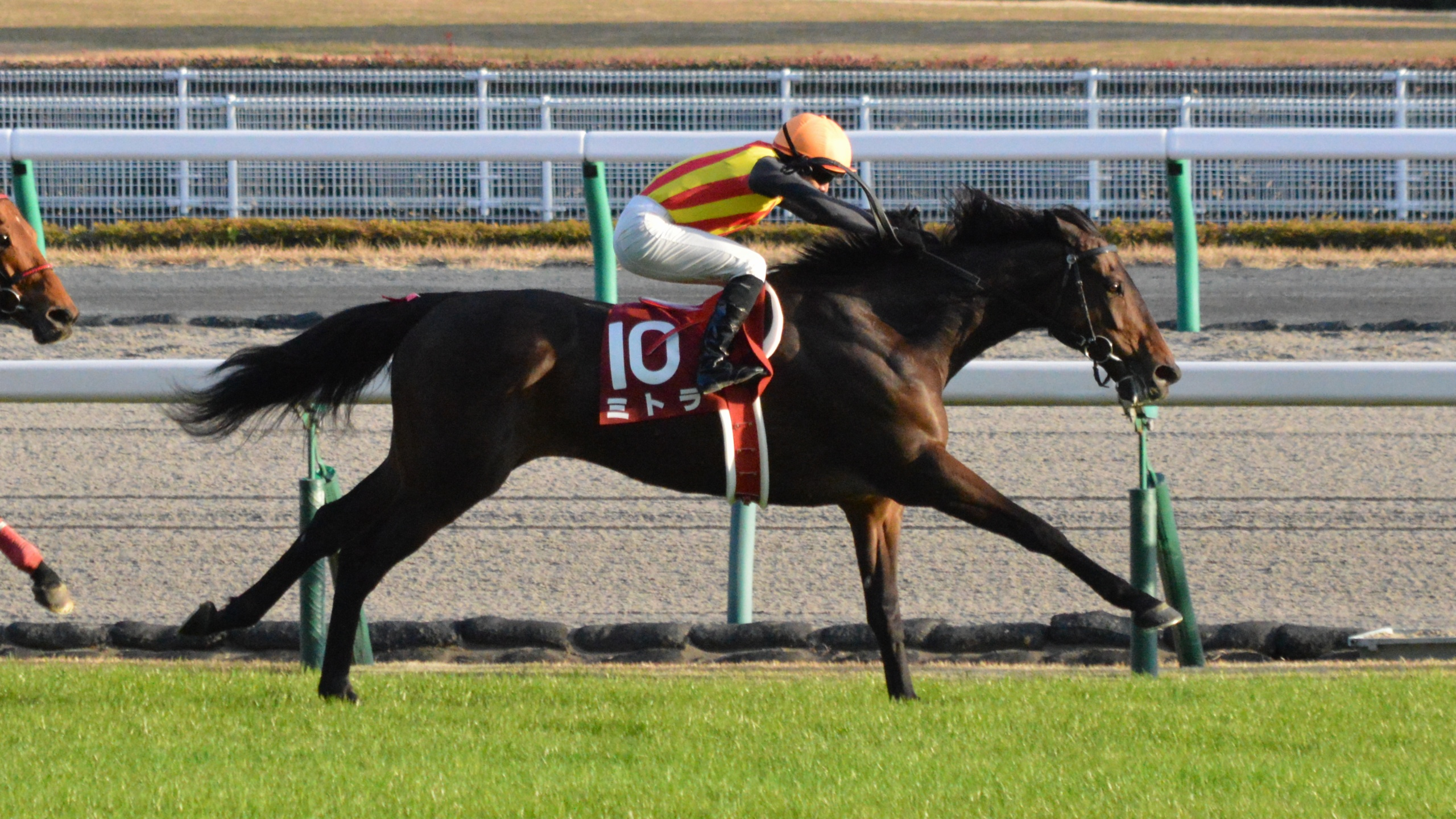
- 2015 Kinko Sho
- Class: Grade 2
- Location: Chukyo Racecourse
- Inaugurated: 1965
- Race type: Thoroughbred Flat racing

Race information
- Distance: 2000 metres
- Surface: Turf
- Track: Left-handed
- Qualification: 4-y-o +
- Weight: Special Weight
- Purse: ¥ 145,220,000 (as of 2024): 1st: ¥ 67,000,000; 2nd: ¥ 27,000,000; 3rd: ¥ 17,000,000

The Kinko Sho (Japanese 金鯱賞) is a Japanese Grade 2 horse race for Thoroughbreds aged four and over. It is run in March over a distance of 2000 metres at Chukyo Racecourse, in Toyoake, Aichi, Japan.

It was first run in 1965 and was promoted to Grade 3 in 1984 before becoming a Grade 2 race in 1996. The race was run in May until 2011 and in December from 2012 until 2016.

== Weight ==
57 kg for four-year-olds above.

Allowances:

- 2 kg for fillies / mares
- 1 kg for southern hemisphere bred three-year-olds

Penalties (excluding two-year-old race performance):

- If a graded stakes race has been won within a year:
  - 2 kg for a grade 1 win (1 kg for fillies / mares)
  - 1 kg for a grade 2 win
- If a graded stakes race has been won for more than a year:
  - 1 kg for a grade 1 win

== Winners since 2000 ==
| Year | Winner | Age | Jockey | Trainer | Owner | Time |
|---|---|---|---|---|---|---|
| 2000 | Meisho Doto | 4 | Yasuhiko Yasuda | Isao Yasuda | Yoshio Matsumoto | 1:58.5 |
| 2001 | Mikki Dance | 5 | Tetsuzo Sato | Toshiyuki Hattori | Hisashi Miki | 1:59.9 |
| 2002 | Tsurumaru Boy | 4 | Norihiro Yokoyama | Kenji Yamauchi | Takao Tsuruda | 1.58.3 |
| 2003 | Tap Dance City | 6 | Tetsuzo Sato | Shozo Sasaki | Yushun Horse Club | 1:58.9 |
| 2004 | Tap Dance City | 7 | Tetsuzo Sato | Shozo Sasaki | Yushun Horse Club | 1:57.5 |
| 2005 | Tap Dance City | 8 | Tetsuzo Sato | Shozo Sasaki | Yushun Horse Club | 1:58.9 |
| 2006 | Kongo Rikishio | 4 | Yasunari Iwata | Kenji Yamauchi | Hisao Kaneoka | 1:58.8 |
| 2007 | Rosenkreuz | 5 | Yusuke Fujioka | Kojiro Hashiguchi | Sunday Racing | 1:57.2 |
| 2008 | Eishin Deputy | 6 | Yasunari Iwata | Akira Nomoto | Toyomitsu Hirai | 1:59.1 |
| 2009 | Sakura Mega Wonder | 6 | Yuichi Fukunaga | Yasuo Tomomichi | Sakura Commerce | 1:58.4 |
| 2010 | Earnestly ^{[1]} | 5 | Tetsuzo Sato | Shozo Sasaki | Koji Maeda | 1:59.5 |
| 2011 | Rulership ^{[1]} | 4 | Yuichi Fukunaga | Katsuhiko Sumii | Sunday Racing | 2:02.4 |
| 2012 | Ocean Blue | 4 | Christophe Lemaire | Yasutoshi Ikee | Shoji Aoshiba | 2:00.4 |
| 2013 | Curren Mirotic | 5 | Kenichi Ikezoe | Osamu Hirata | Takashi Suzuki | 1:59.6 |
| 2014 | Last Impact | 4 | Yuga Kawada | Hiroyoshi Matsuda | Silk Impact | 1:58.8 |
| 2015 | Mitra | 7 | Yuichi Shibayama | Kiyoshi Hagiwara | Katsumi Yoshida | 1:58.8 |
| 2016 | Yamakatsu Ace | 4 | Kenichi Ikezoe | Kaneo Ikezoe | Kazuo Yamada | 1:59.7 |
| 2017 | Yamakatsu Ace | 5 | Kenichi Ikezoe | Kaneo Ikezoe | Kazuo Yamada | 1:59.2 |
| 2018 | Suave Richard | 4 | Mirco Demuro | Yasushi Shono | NICKS | 2:01.6 |
| 2019 | Danon Premium | 4 | Yuga Kawada | Mitsumasa Nakauchida | Danox | 2:00.1 |
| 2020 | Saturnalia | 4 | Christophe Lemaire | Katsuhiko Sumii | Carrot Farm | 2:01.6 |
| 2021 | Gibeon | 6 | Atsuya Nishimura | Hideaki Fujiwara | Shadai Race Horse | 2:01.8 |
| 2022 | Jack d'Or | 4 | Yusuke Fujioka | Kenichi Fujioka | Toshiyuki Maehara | 1:57.2 |
| 2023 | Prognosis | 5 | Yuga Kawada | Mitsumasa Nakauchida | Shadai Race Horse | 1:59.8 |
| 2024 | Prognosis | 6 | Yuga Kawada | Mitsumasa Nakauchida | Shadai Race Horse | 1:57.6 |
| 2025 | Queen's Walk | 4 | Yuga Kawada | Mitsumasa Nakauchida | Sunday Racing | 2:01.3 |
| 2026 | Shake Your Heart | 6 | Yoshihiro Furukawa | Toru Miya | Chizu Yoshida | 1:58.1 |

^{1} The 2010 and 2011 races took place at Kyoto Racecourse in May.

== Earlier winners ==
- 1965 - Aoba
- 1966 - Pacific Rim
- 1967 - Kuribatsuku
- 1968 - Lohengrin
- 1969 - Hakusenshou
- 1970 - Arion
- 1971 - Suinhoushuu
- 1972 - Shingun
- 1973 - Sakaekah O
- 1974 - Houshuu Missile
- 1975 - Suzuka Hard
- 1976 - Yamabuki O
- 1977 - Machikane Raiko
- 1978 - Three Fires
- 1979 - Nichido Arashi
- 1980 - Marry Joy
- 1981 - Over Rainbow
- 1982 - Terno Hope
- 1983 - Lovely Star
- 1984 - Towa Kachidoki
- 1985 - Cannon Z
- 1986 - Izumi Star
- 1987 - Knockout
- 1988 - Passing Power
- 1989 - Marubutsu First
- 1990 - Marron Glace
- 1991 - Movie Star
- 1992 - Ikuno Dictus
- 1993 - Wish Dream
- 1994 - Marvelous Crown
- 1995 - Samani Beppin
- 1996 - Fujiyama Kenzan
- 1997 - Generalist
- 1998 - Silence Suzuka
- 1999 - Midnight Bet

== See also ==
- Horse racing in Japan
- List of Japanese flat horse races
