= Jack d'Or =

Japanese Thoroughbred racehorse

Jack d'Or ジャックドール
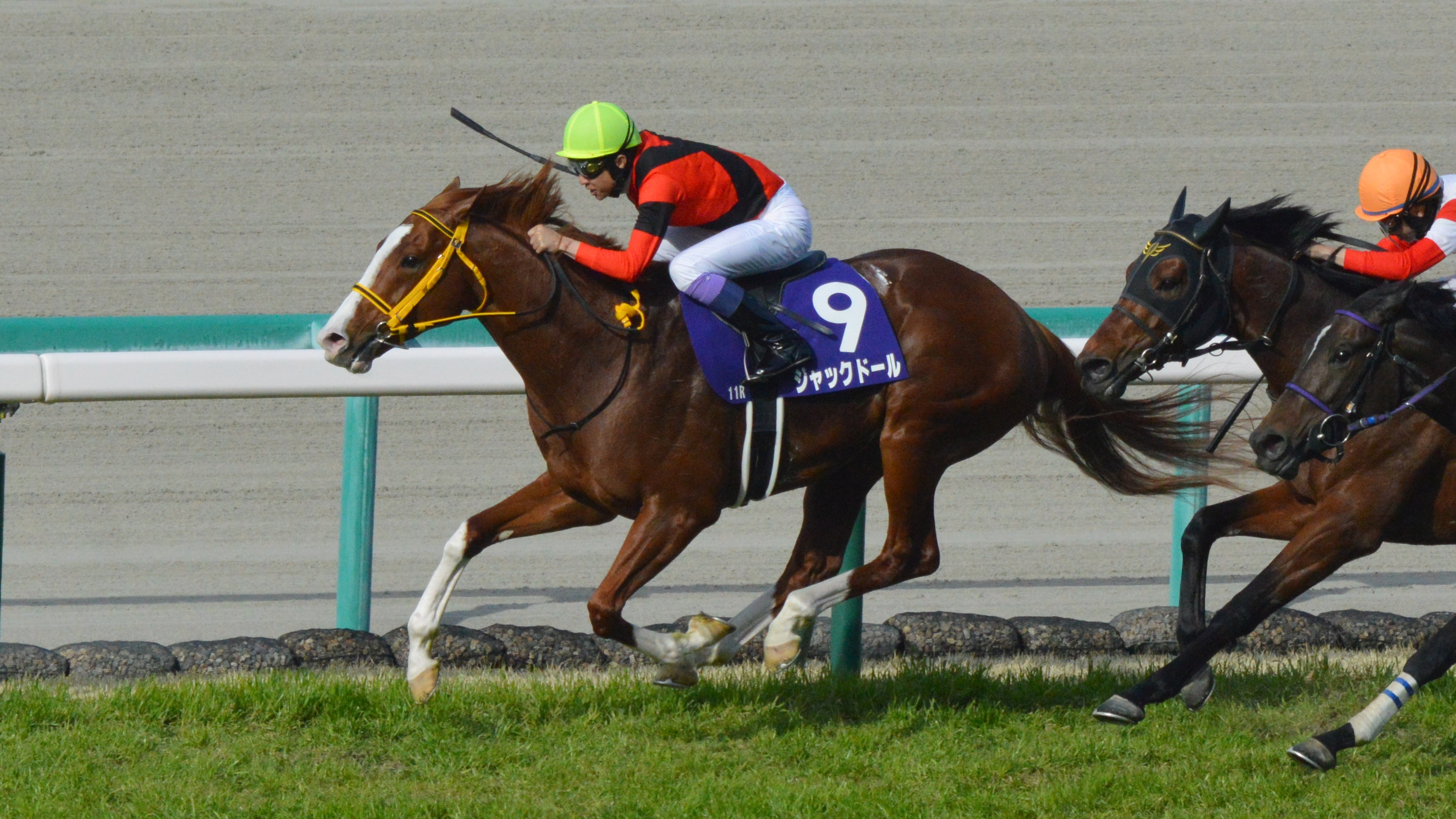
- Jack d'Or at the 2023 Ōsaka Hai
- Breed: Thoroughbred
- Sire: Maurice
- Grandsire: Screen Hero
- Dam: Ravarino
- Damsire: Unbridled's Song
- Sex: Stallion
- Foaled: 8 April 2018
- Country: Japan
- Color: Chestnut
- Breeder: Crown Hidaka Farm
- Owner: Toshiyuki Maehara
- Racing colours
- Trainer: Kenichi Fujioka
- Jockey: Yusuke Fujioka; Yutaka Take
- Record: 17: 8-2-0
- Earnings: ¥490,042,000

Major wins
- Ōsaka Hai (2023); Kinko Sho (2022); Sapporo Kinen (2022)
- Last updated on December 25, 2025

Jack d'Or (ジャックドール, born 8 April 2018) is a retired Japanese Thoroughbred racehorse who won the Ōsaka Hai in 2023. He was active from 2020 to 2023 and had total earnings of ¥490,042,000.

== Background ==
Jack d'Or is a chestnut horse foaled by Ravarino, a daughter of Unbridled's Song, and was born on April 8, 2018 at the Crown Hidaka Farm. His sire, Maurice, was a Japanese racehorse who won numerous G1 races and was sired by Screen Hero.

He was sold as a yearling at the Hokkaido Selection Sale for 34,560,000 JPY.

== Racing Record ==
Jack d'Or competed in a total of 17 races, winning eight. The table below shows his racing career which was taken from netkeiba, JBIS and Hong Kong Jockey Club.

Date	Race	Grade	Distance	Surface	Track	Runner	Finish	Time	Margin	Jockey	Winner (Runner-up)
2020 – two-year-old season
Dec 6	2YO DEBUT		2000m	Turf	Nakayama	16	2nd	2:05.3	0.4	Arata Saito	Aoi Sho
Dec 27	2YO MAIDEN		2000m	Turf	Hanshin	16	2nd	2:01.6	0.2	Yusuke Fujioka	Happy Awesome
2021 – three-year-old season
Apr 25	3YO MAIDEN		2000m	Turf	Hanshin	15	1st	2:00.3	-1.4	Yusuke Fujioka	(Gravite)
May 8	Principal Stakes	Listed	2000m	Turf	Tokyo	14	5th	1:59.9	0.6	Kosei Miura	Baji O
Sep 11	3YO+	ALW (1 Win)	2000m	Turf	Chukyo	12	1st	1:59.4	-0.3	Yusuke Fujioka	(Wind Ripper)
Oct 3	Hamanako Tokubetsu	ALW (2 Win)	2000m	Turf	Chukyo	8	1st	2:01.5	-0.5	Yusuke Fujioka	(North the World)
Nov 28	Welcome Stakes	ALW (3 Win)	2000m	Turf	Tokyo	16	1st	1:58.4	-0.6	Yusuke Fujioka	(Heart's Histoire)
2022 – four-year-old season
Jan 29	Shirafuji Stakes	Listed	2000m	Turf	Tokyo	14	1st	1:57.4	-0.2	Yusuke Fujioka	(Admire Hadar)
Mar 13	Kinko Sho	G2	2000m	Turf	Chukyo	13	1st	1:57.2	-0.4	Yusuke Fujioka	(Lei Papale)
Apr 3	Ōsaka Hai	G1	2000m	Turf	Hanshin	16	5th	1:58.9	0.5	Yusuke Fujioka	Potager
Aug 21	Sapporo Kinen	G2	2000m	Turf	Sapporo	16	1st	2:01.2	0.0	Yusuke Fujioka	(Panthalassa)
Oct 30	Tennō Shō (Autumn)	G1	2000m	Turf	Tokyo	15	4th	1:57.8	0.3	Yusuke Fujioka	Equinox
Dec 11	Hong Kong Cup	G1	2000m	Turf	Sha Tin	12	7th	2:00.8	1.1	Yutaka Take	Romantic Warrior
2023 – five-year-old season
Apr 2	Osaka Hai	G1	2000m	Turf	Hanshin	16	1st	1:57.4	0.0	Yutaka Take	(Stars on Earth)
Jun 4	Yasuda Kinen	G1	1600m	Turf	Tokyo	18	5th	1:31.7	0.3	Yutaka Take	Songline
Aug 20	Sapporo Kinen	G2	2000m	Turf	Sapporo	15	6th	2:03.2	1.7	Yutaka Take	Prognosis
Oct 29	Tennō Shō (Autumn)	G1	2000m	Turf	Tokyo	11	11th	1:58.4	3.2	Yusuke Fujioka	Equinox

== Pedigree ==
Pedigree of Jack d'Or, chestnut horse, 2018
Sire Maurice 2011	Screen Hero; 2004	Grass Wonder	Silver Hawk
Sire Maurice 2011	Screen Hero; 2004	Grass Wonder	Ameriflora
Sire Maurice 2011	Screen Hero; 2004	Running Heroine	Sunday Silence
Sire Maurice 2011	Screen Hero; 2004	Running Heroine	Dyna Actress
Sire Maurice 2011	Mejiro Frances; 2001	Carnegie	Sadler's Wells
Sire Maurice 2011	Mejiro Frances; 2001	Carnegie	Detroit
Sire Maurice 2011	Mejiro Frances; 2001	Mejiro Monterey	Mogami
Sire Maurice 2011	Mejiro Frances; 2001	Mejiro Monterey	Mejiro Quincey
Dam Ravarino 2004	Unbridled's Song; 1993	Unbridled	Fappiano
Dam Ravarino 2004	Unbridled's Song; 1993	Unbridled	Gana Facil
Dam Ravarino 2004	Unbridled's Song; 1993	Trolley Song	Caro
Dam Ravarino 2004	Unbridled's Song; 1993	Trolley Song	Lucky Spell
Dam Ravarino 2004	Sous Entendu; 1987	Shadeed	Nijinsky
Dam Ravarino 2004	Sous Entendu; 1987	Shadeed	Continual
Dam Ravarino 2004	Sous Entendu; 1987	It's in the Air	Mr. Prospector
Dam Ravarino 2004	Sous Entendu; 1987	It's in the Air	A Wind Is Rising
