= Meisho Hario =

Japanese Thoroughbred racehorse (2017–2025)

Meisho Hario メイショウハリオ
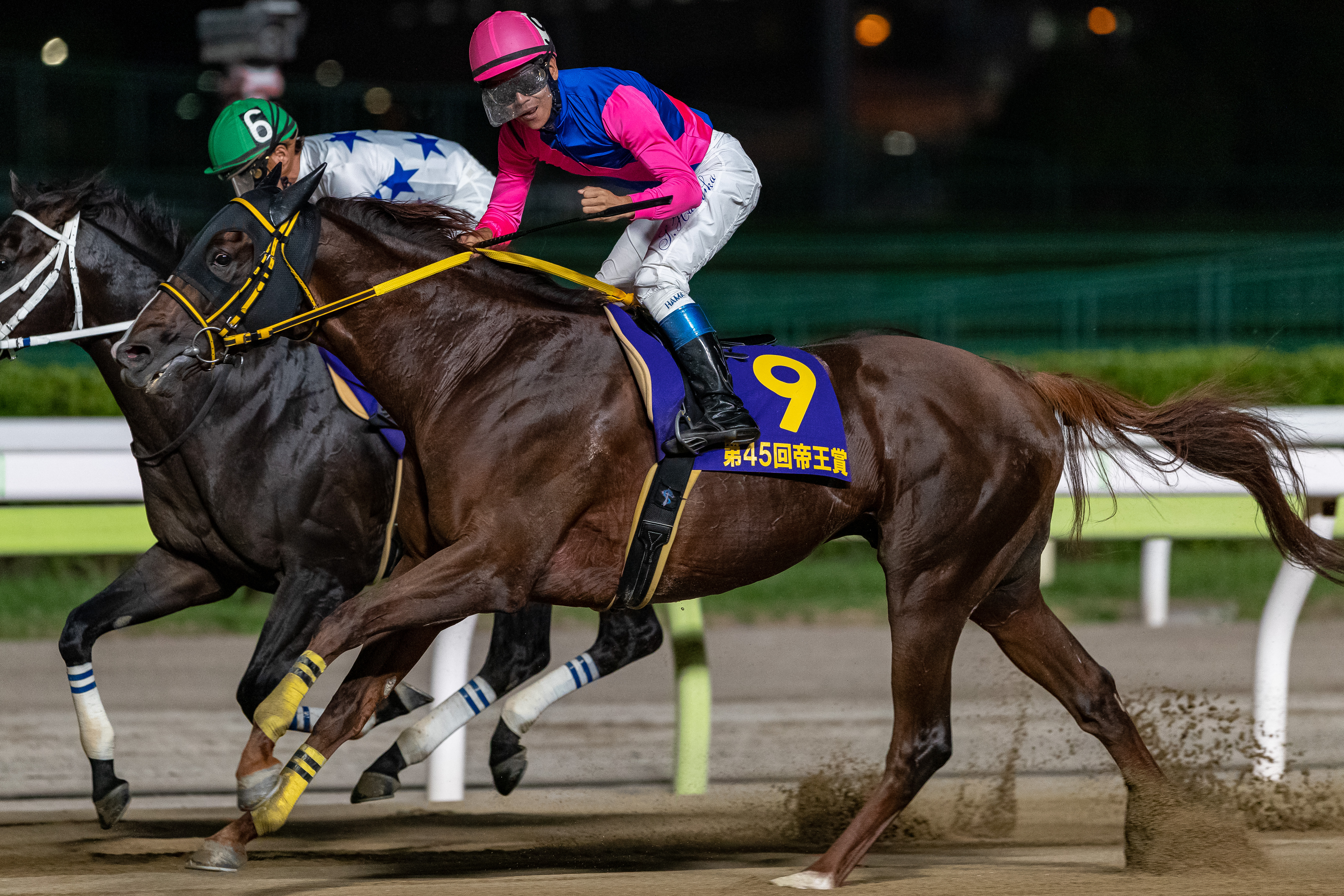
- Meisho Hario winning the 2022 Teio Sho
- Breed: Thoroughbred
- Sire: Pyro
- Grandsire: Pulpit
- Dam: Meisho Ohi
- Damsire: Manhattan Cafe
- Sex: Stallion
- Foaled: 25 February 2017
- Country: Japan
- Colour: Chestnut
- Breeder: Mishima Bokujo
- Owner: Yoshio Matsumoto
- Racing colours
- Trainer: Inao Okada
- Jockey: Suguru Hamanaka
- Record: 32: 10-5-5 (21 JRA: 6-2-3; 11 NAR: 4-3-2)
- Earnings: ¥666,305,000

Major wins
- Teio Sho (2022, 2023); Kashiwa Kinen (2023); Kawasaki Kinen (2025); Miyako Stakes (2021); March Stakes (2022)

Meisho Hario (Japanese: メイショウハリオ, Hepburn: Meishō Harīo; 25 February 2017) is a retired Japanese Thoroughbred racehorse and active sire. He competed from 2020 to 2025, recording ten wins in thirty-two starts, including the Teio Sho (JpnI) in 2022 and 2023, the Kashiwa Kinen (JpnI) in 2023, the Kawasaki Kinen (JpnI) in 2025, the Miyako Stakes (GIII) in 2021, and the March Stakes (GIII) in 2022. He is the half-brother of T O Royal, winner of the 2024 Tennō Shō (Spring).

== Background ==
Meisho Hario is a chestnut horse bred in Urakawa, Hokkaido, by Mishima Bokujo. He was sired by Pyro, an American-bred son of Pulpit, and his dam was Meisho Ohi, a daughter of Manhattan Cafe. His dam's half-son T O Royal (by Leontes) won the 2024 Tennō Shō (Spring) and three other graded stakes. His racing name combines the "Meisho" prefix used by owner Yoshio Matsumoto with "Hario," derived from the white-throated needletail (ハリオアマツバメ), the world's fastest bird in level flight. He was sent into training with Inao Okada at the JRA's Ritto Training Center.

== Racing career ==
=== 2020: Three-year-old season ===
Meisho Hario debuted on April 5, 2020, in a maiden race on the dirt at Hanshin Racecourse, finishing fifth. He won a maiden race at Fukushima Racecourse on April 18. He won a 1-win-class race at Kyoto Racecourse on October 17.

=== 2021: Four-year-old season ===
Meisho Hario won the Kokurajo Tokubetsu (Allowance) at Kokura Racecourse in January and the Kunpu Stakes (Allowance) at Tokyo Racecourse in May. He finished second in the July Stakes (Listed) at Fukushima and the Uzumasa Stakes (Open) at Hanshin. On November 7, he won the Miyako Stakes (GIII) at Hanshin, defeating Lord Bless by a nose. He finished seventh in the Champions Cup (GI) at Chukyo Racecourse in December.

=== 2022: Five-year-old season ===
On March 27, Meisho Hario won the March Stakes (GIII) at Nakayama Racecourse, defeating Kenshinko by 0.1 seconds. He finished third in the Heian Stakes (GIII) at Chukyo in May.

On June 29, he contested the Teio Sho (JpnI) at Oi Racecourse, his first start in NAR competition. Ridden by Suguru Hamanaka, he won by a neck over Chuwa Wizard, recording his first Grade 1-level victory. He finished fifth in the JBC Classic (JpnI) at Morioka Racecourse in November and third in the Tokyo Daishoten (GI) at Oi in December.

=== 2023: Six-year-old season ===
Meisho Hario finished third in the February Stakes (GI) at Tokyo in February. On May 4, he won the Kashiwa Kinen (JpnI) at Funabashi Racecourse, defeating Tagano Beauty by 0.1 seconds. On June 28, he won the Teio Sho (JpnI) at Oi for a second consecutive year, defeating Crown Pride by a nose, becoming the first horse to win consecutive runnings of the race. He finished fourth in the JBC Classic (JpnI) at Oi in November and fifth in the Champions Cup (GI) at Chukyo in December.

=== 2024: Seven-year-old season ===
Meisho Hario was scratched from the Saudi Cup (G1) at King Abdulaziz Racetrack on February 24 due to a gait abnormality, which also forced him to miss the Dubai World Cup. He finished ninth in the Teio Sho (JpnI) at Oi in June. He finished third in the Nippon TV Hai (JpnII) at Funabashi in September and second in the JBC Classic (JpnI) at Saga Racecourse in November. He was withdrawn from the Champions Cup (GI) one week before the race due to left hindlimb muscle soreness.

=== 2025: Eight-year-old season and retirement ===
Meisho Hario finished sixth in the February Stakes (GI) at Tokyo in February. On April 9, he won the Kawasaki Kinen (JpnI) at Kawasaki Racecourse, defeating Dicteon by 0.75 lengths, recording his fourth JpnI victory. He finished seventh in the Heian Stakes (GIII) at Kyoto in May. He was scheduled to run the Teio Sho (JpnI) at Oi on July 2, but while en route to Oi, the horse choked on his feed inside the horse van, developing an esophageal obstruction as a result. The horse was rushed to a gas station inside a service area on the Shin-Tōmei Expressway where his groom cleared his throat using a water hose that was available there. The horse was successfully resuscitated, but was withdrawn from the race as a result.

He finished second in the JBC Classic (JpnI) at Funabashi in November. On December 7, he finished fourth in the Champions Cup (GI) at Chukyo, ridden by Yutaka Take for the first time. He was deregistered from JRA competition on December 12, 2025.

== Statistics ==
The following table details all 32 starts (plus 2 scratches) of Meisho Hario's racing career based on official netkeiba and JBIS records.

Date	Distance (Condition)	Race	Class	Course	Odds (Favourite)	Field	Finish	Time	Jockey	Winning (Losing) Margin	Winner (2nd Place)	Ref
2020 – three-year-old season
Apr 5	Dirt 1400 m (Firm)	3-Y-O Maiden	Maiden	Hanshin	50.2 (11th)	16	5th	1:25.9	Yuji Hishida	0.8	Wide Kant	
Apr 18	Dirt 1700 m (Good)	3-Y-O Maiden	Maiden	Fukushima	2.1 (1st)	15	1st	1:49.2	Yuji Hishida	–0.3	(Ryugu Hayabusa)	
May 16	Dirt 1800 m (Soft)	3-Y-O 1-Win Class	Allowance	Kyoto	52.5 (11th)	16	10th	1:51.5	Fuma Matsuwaka	1.2	Sunrise Hope	
Aug 23	Dirt 1700 m (Soft)	3-Y-O 1-Win Class	Allowance	Kokura	19.2 (7th)	16	3rd	1:43.8	Yuji Hishida	0.2	Lily Minister	
Sep 6	Dirt 1700 m (Soft)	3-Y-O 1-Win Class	Allowance	Kokura	6.1 (3rd)	15	5th	1:44.3	Manabu Sakai	1.1	Smart Ariel	
Sep 26	Dirt 1400 m (Good)	3-Y-O 1-Win Class	Allowance	Chukyo	2.6 (1st)	14	4th	1:24.6	Yuji Hishida	0.9	Sunrise Rapporte	
Oct 17	Dirt 1400 m (Soft)	3-Y-O 1-Win Class	Allowance	Kyoto	5.1 (2nd)	16	1st	1:23.3	Kota Fujioka	0.0	(T Trap)	
2021 – four-year-old season
Jan 23	Dirt 1700 m (Soft)	Kokurajo Tokubetsu	Allowance	Kokura	10.0 (5th)	16	1st	1:43.6	Atsuya Nishimura	–0.1	(Meisho Yokaze)	
May 2	Dirt 1400 m (Good)	Tenmabashi Stakes	3-Win Class	Hanshin	16.3 (8th)	16	10th	1:24.7	Fuma Matsuwaka	0.8	Suzuka Festa	
May 30	Dirt 1600 m (Firm)	Kunpu Stakes	3-Win Class	Tokyo	15.9 (5th)	16	1st	1:36.8	Kazuo Yokoyama	–0.2	(Bambton Heart)	
Jul 17	Dirt 1700 m (Firm)	July Stakes	Listed	Fukushima	5.6 (2nd)	15	2nd	1:44.8	Hironobu Tanabe	0.8	Kenshinko	
Oct 16	Dirt 1800 m (Firm)	Uzumasa Stakes	Open	Hanshin	11.7 (8th)	16	2nd	1:51.3	Yasunari Iwata	0.0	Light Warrior	
Nov 7	Dirt 1800 m (Firm)	Miyako Stakes	GIII	Hanshin	13.0 (5th)	16	1st	1:50.8	Suguru Hamanaka	0.0	(Lord Bless)	
Dec 5	Dirt 1800 m (Firm)	Champions Cup	GI	Chukyo	24.8 (10th)	16	7th	1:51.1	Suguru Hamanaka	1.4	T O Keynes	
2022 – five-year-old season
Mar 27	Dirt 1800 m (Soft)	March Stakes	GIII	Nakayama	5.8 (2nd)	16	1st	1:50.2	Suguru Hamanaka	–0.1	(Kenshinko)	
May 21	Dirt 1900 m (Firm)	Heian Stakes	GIII	Chukyo	7.0 (3rd)	16	3rd	1:57.8	Suguru Hamanaka	0.8	T O Keynes	
Jun 29	Dirt 2000 m (Firm)	Teio Sho	JpnI	Oi	19.2 (5th)	9	1st	2:03.3	Suguru Hamanaka	0.0	(Chuwa Wizard)	
Nov 3	Dirt 2000 m (Firm)	JBC Classic	JpnI	Morioka	5.7 (3rd)	15	5th	2:03.3	Suguru Hamanaka	1.2	T O Keynes	
Dec 29	Dirt 2000 m (Firm)	Tokyo Daishoten	GI	Oi	2.3 (1st)	14	3rd	2:05.8	Suguru Hamanaka	0.8	Ushba Tesoro	
2023 – six-year-old season
Feb 19	Dirt 1600 m (Firm)	February Stakes	GI	Tokyo	10.7 (4th)	16	3rd	1:36.2	Suguru Hamanaka	0.6	Lemon Pop	
May 4	Dirt 1600 m (Firm)	Kashiwa Kinen	JpnI	Funabashi	3.2 (2nd)	13	1st	1:39.3	Suguru Hamanaka	–0.1	(Tagano Beauty)	
Jun 28	Dirt 2000 m (Firm)	Teio Sho	JpnI	Oi	3.9 (2nd)	12	1st	2:01.9	Suguru Hamanaka	0.0	(Crown Pride)	
Nov 3	Dirt 2000 m (Firm)	JBC Classic	JpnI	Oi	2.3 (1st)	10	4th	2:06.5	Suguru Hamanaka	1.4	King's Sword	
Dec 3	Dirt 1800 m (Firm)	Champions Cup	GI	Chukyo	15.9 (6th)	15	5th	1:51.3	Suguru Hamanaka	0.7	Lemon Pop	
2024 – seven-year-old season
Feb 24	Dirt 1800 m (Fast)	Saudi Cup	G1	KAA	–	15	Scratched	–	Suguru Hamanaka	–	Senor Buscador	
Jun 26	Dirt 2000 m (Good)	Teio Sho	JpnI	Oi	10.9 (5th)	13	9th	2:09.3	Suguru Hamanaka	2.4	King's Sword	
Sep 25	Dirt 1800 m (Firm)	Nippon TV Hai	JpnII	Funabashi	15.3 (4th)	13	3rd	1:53.9	Suguru Hamanaka	1.1	William Barows	
Nov 4	Dirt 2000 m (Firm)	JBC Classic	JpnI	Saga	6.4 (4th)	11	2nd	2:08.8	Suguru Hamanaka	0.8	Wilson Tesoro	
2025 – eight-year-old season
Feb 23	Dirt 1600 m (Firm)	February Stakes	GI	Tokyo	68.1 (11th)	16	6th	1:36.3	Suguru Hamanaka	0.8	Costa Nova	
Apr 9	Dirt 2100 m (Good)	Kawasaki Kinen	JpnI	Kawasaki	6.3 (3rd)	13	1st	2:18.0	Suguru Hamanaka	–0.1	(Diktaean)	
May 24	Dirt 1900 m (Good)	Heian Stakes	GIII	Kyoto	5.5 (3rd)	16	7th	1:57.8	Suguru Hamanaka	0.6	Outrange	
Jul 2	Dirt 2000 m (Firm)	Teio Sho	JpnI	Oi	–	14	Scratched	–	Suguru Hamanaka	–	Mikki Fight	
Nov 3	Dirt 1800 m (Good)	JBC Classic	JpnI	Funabashi	39.2 (7th)	14	2nd	1:52.6	Suguru Hamanaka	0.6	Mikki Fight	
Dec 7	Dirt 1800 m (Firm)	Champions Cup	GI	Chukyo	16.2 (8th)	16	4th	1:50.6	Yutaka Take	0.4	W Heart Bond	

== Post-racing career ==
Following his retirement, Meisho Hario entered stud at East Stud in Urakawa, Hokkaido.

== Pedigree ==
Pedigree of Meisho Hario (JPN)
Sire Pyro (USA) 2005	Pulpit (USA); 1994	A.P. Indy	Seattle Slew
Sire Pyro (USA) 2005	Pulpit (USA); 1994	A.P. Indy	Weekend Surprise
Sire Pyro (USA) 2005	Pulpit (USA); 1994	Preach	Mr. Prospector
Sire Pyro (USA) 2005	Pulpit (USA); 1994	Preach	Narrate
Sire Pyro (USA) 2005	Wild Vision (USA); 1998	Wild Again	Icecapade
Sire Pyro (USA) 2005	Wild Vision (USA); 1998	Wild Again	Bushel-n-Peck
Sire Pyro (USA) 2005	Wild Vision (USA); 1998	Carol's Wonder	Pass the Tab
Sire Pyro (USA) 2005	Wild Vision (USA); 1998	Carol's Wonder	Carols Christmas
Dam Meisho Ohi (JPN) 2008	Manhattan Cafe (JPN); 1998	Sunday Silence	Halo
Dam Meisho Ohi (JPN) 2008	Manhattan Cafe (JPN); 1998	Sunday Silence	Wishing Well
Dam Meisho Ohi (JPN) 2008	Manhattan Cafe (JPN); 1998	Subtle Change	Law Society
Dam Meisho Ohi (JPN) 2008	Manhattan Cafe (JPN); 1998	Subtle Change	Santa Luciana
Dam Meisho Ohi (JPN) 2008	Alpine Rose (USA); 1999	Kris S.	Roberto
Dam Meisho Ohi (JPN) 2008	Alpine Rose (USA); 1999	Kris S.	Sharp Queen
Dam Meisho Ohi (JPN) 2008	Alpine Rose (USA); 1999	Amizette	Forty Niner
Dam Meisho Ohi (JPN) 2008	Alpine Rose (USA); 1999	Amizette	Courtly Dee

- Meisho Hario is inbred 4 × 5 to Mr. Prospector and 5 × 5 to Hail to Reason.
- His half-brother T O Royal (by Leontes) won the 2024 Tennō Shō (Spring, GI) and three other graded stakes.

== See also ==
- Thoroughbred racing in Japan
- Teio Sho
- Kawasaki Kinen
