= Meisho (disambiguation) =

Meisho are locations alluded to in Japanese poetry.

Meisho may also refer to:

- Empress Meishō, Empress of Japan from 1629-1643
- Meishō Line, railway line in Mie Prefecture, Japan.
- Racehorses owned by Yoshio Matsumoto using the "Meisho" crown name:
  - Meisho Doto
  - Meisho Hario
  - Meisho Mambo
  - Meisho Samson
  - Meisho Tabaru
