= Chukyo Nisai Stakes =

Japanese thoroughbred race

Chukyo Nisai Stakes 中京2歳ステークス
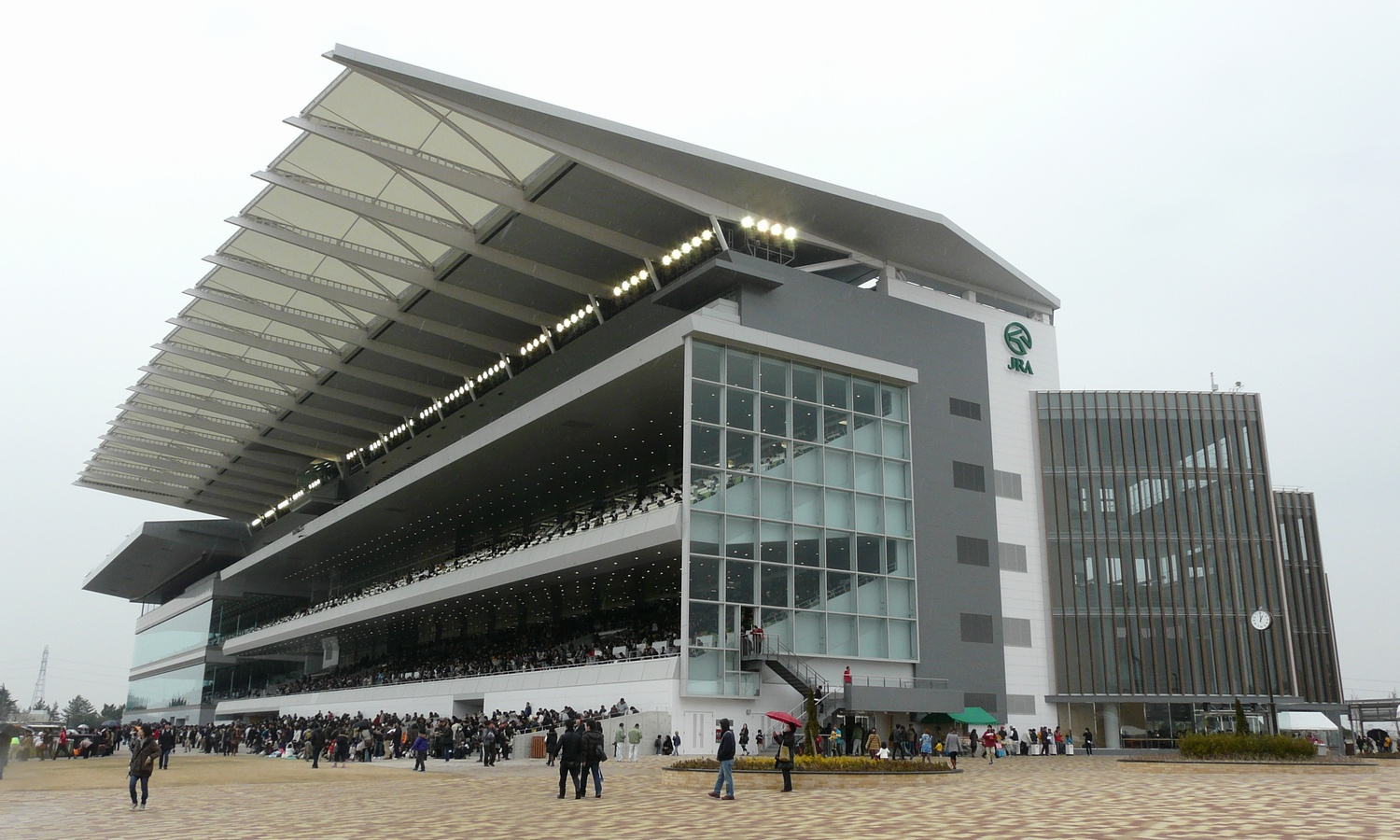
- Chukyo Racecourse
- Class: Grade 3
- Location: Chukyo Racecourse
- Inaugurated: 1960
- Race type: Thoroughbred Flat racing

Race information
- Distance: 1,400 meters
- Surface: Turf
- Track: Left-handed
- Qualification: 2-y-o
- Weight: Handicap
- Purse: ¥ 66,860,000 (as of 2025): 1st: ¥ 31,000,000; 2nd: ¥ 12,000,000; 3rd: ¥ 8,000,000

The Chukyo Nisai Stakes (Japanese 中京2歳ステークス) is a Grade 3 horse race for Thoroughbred horses aged two run in August over a distance of 1,400 meters at Chukyo Racecourse.

The race was first established in 1960 as Chukyo Sansai Stakes and was run at 1,200 meters. In 1971, the distance was increased to 1,400 meters and in 1982, to 1,800 meters. The race was renamed to its current name in 2001 following the international standard for horse age notation. Due to snowfall in 2003, the race was run on the dirt course at the distance of 1,700 meters. The race was not run in 2010 and 2011 due to renovation work at Chukyo Racecourse. From 2012 until 2020, the distance changed to 1,400 meters, 1,600 meters, and finally 1,200 meters. In 2025, the race was promoted to Grade 3 status and with the distance changed back to 1,400 meters.

== Winners since 2000 ==
Year	Winner	Jockey	Trainer	Owner	Time
2000	Cheers Brightly	Minoru Yoshida	Kenji Yamauchi	Kiyoko Kitamura	1:49.7
2001	Zenno Karnak	Ryo Takahashi	Shuji Kitahashi	Shinobu Oosako	1:50.7
2002	Hoshi Commander	Tetsuzo Sato	Yutaka Masumoto	Takeshi Nagai	1:49.2
2003	Black Condor	Koshiro Take	Kunihide Matsuda	Shadai Race Horse Co. Ltd.	1:46.6
2004	Bright Tomorrow	Ryuji Wada	Sei Ishizaka	Sunday Racing Co. Ltd.	1:47.7
2005	Meisho Samson	Mamoru Ishibashi	Tsutomu Setoguchi	Yoshio Matsumoto	1:47.5
2006	Daiwa Scarlet	Katsumi Ando	Kunihide Matsuda	Keizo Oshiro	1:47.8
2007	Hokkai Kanthi	Shu Ishibashi	Masato Shibata	U. Hokkai Bokujo	1:47.7
2008	Meisho Dontaku	Hiroyuki Uemura	Isao Yasuda	Yoshio Matsumoto	1:49.3
2009	Shine	Shinji Kawashima	Yoshihiko Kawamura	Asako Ro	1:48.5
2010	no race				
2011	no race				
2012	A Shin Top	Suguru Hamanaka	Masato Nishizono	Eishindo Co. Ltd.	1:23.9
2013	Grand Sherry	Suguru Hamanaka	Yasushi Shono	Hidenao Mamiya	1:22.7
2014	Quetzaltenango	Suguru Hamanaka	Kazuhide Sasada	G1 Racing Co. Ltd.	1:40.5
2015	Shuji	Futoshi Komaki	Kojiro Hashiguchi	Koji Yasuhara	1:36.0
2016	Dipavamsa	Christophe Lemaire	Takeshi Matsushita	Carrot Farm Co. Ltd.	1:35.0
2017	Amalfi Coast	Suguru Hamanaka	Kazuya Makita	Shadai Race Horse Co. Ltd.	1:34.7
2018	Admire Mars	Mirco Demuro	Yasuo Tomomichi	Junko Kondo	1:34.7
2019	Rhinebeck	Yuichi Fukunaga	Yasuo Tomomichi	Kaneko Makoto Holdings Co. Ltd.	1:36.5
2020	Gold Chalice	Suguru Hamanaka	Koshiro Take	Field Racing	1:09.5
2021	Jean Gros	Yutaka Take	Hideyuki Mori	Susumu Fujita	1:08.4
2022	Big Caesar	Hideaki Miyuki	Masato Nishizono	Masanobu Habata	1:08.0
2023	Kris Arthur	Nana Kawaharada	Kunihiko Watanabe	Shiho Oto	1:08.6
2024	American Stage	Yasunari Iwata	Yoshito Yahagi	Yoshizawa Holdings Co. Ltd	1:09.1
2025	Candide	Yuichi Kitamura	Takeshi Matsushita	Green Farm Co., Ltd.	1:19.4 (Note: Set the current 2YO track record)
2026	G T Maika	Kohei Matsuyama	Kyoko Maekawa	Toshihiko Tabata	1:19.7

== Earlier winners ==
- 1986 - Nihon Pillow Clear
- 1987 - Nishino Kabutozan
- 1988 - Go Go King
- 1989 - S.R.B.Hero
- 1990 - Iide Saison
- 1991 - Mayano Petrus
- 1992 - Legacy Thanks
- 1993 - Dragon There
- 1994 - Daitaku Teio
- 1995 - Center Rising
- 1996 - Pastry Chef
- 1997 - Eidai Queen
- 1998 - T.M.Choten
- 1999 - Daitaku Riva

== See also ==
- Horse racing in Japan
- List of Japanese flat horse races
