= March Stakes (Japan) =

March Stakes マーチステークス
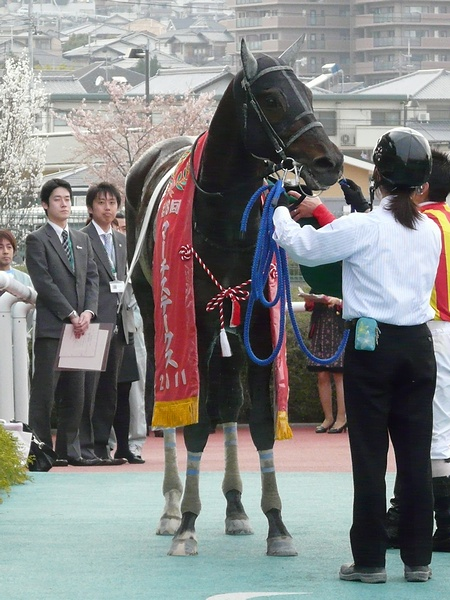
- Testa Matta after winning the 2011 March Stakes
- Class: Grade 3
- Location: Nakayama Racecourse
- Inaugurated: 1994
- Race type: Thoroughbred Flat racing

Race information
- Distance: 1800 metres
- Surface: Dirt
- Track: Right-handed
- Qualification: 4-y-o+
- Weight: Handicap
- Purse: ¥ 82,380,000 (as of 2025): 1st: ¥ 38,000,000; 2nd: ¥ 15,000,000; 3rd: ¥ 10,000,000

The March Stakes (Japanese マーチステークス) is a Grade 3 horse race in Japan for Thoroughbreds aged four and over, run in March over a distance of 1800 metres on dirt at Nakayama Racecourse.

It was first run in 1994 and has held Grade 3 status ever since. The race was run at Hanshin Racecourse in 2011.

== Previous winners ==
Year	Winner	Age	Jockey	Trainer	Owner	Time
1994	Bamboo Genesis	5	Yutaka Take	Kunihiko Take	Bamboo Stud	1:50.0
1995	Toyo Lyphard	5	Masahiro Matsunaga	Yoshiharu Matsunaga	Toyo Club	1:50.5
1996	Ami Cyclone	6	Takayuki Hirame	Yoichiro Asano	Naito Stud	1:53.3
1997	Wild Blaster	5	Hiroki Hashimoto	Hitoshi Arai	Yoshinobu Hayashi	1:51.5
1998	Wild Blaster	6	Hiroki Hashimoto	Hitoshi Arai	Yoshinobu Hayashi	1:51.9
1999	Tayasu K.Point	4	Kazuhiro Kato	Kiyohiro Tadokoro	Atsumu Tadokoro	1:51.3
2000	Tamamo Strong	5	Koike Takao	Shinobu Yoshinaga	Tamamo	1:49.7
2001	Island Oja	5	Eiji Nakadate	Masakatsu Sakai	Fumio Shimamura	1:50.8
2002	Mambo Twist	7	Katsumi Ando	Taira Furukawa	Genichiro Tabara	1:51.3
2003	Smart Boy	8	Naoto Ito	Keizo Ito	Grand Stud	1:52.0
2004	En Dehors	5	Mikio Matsunaga	Hiroyuki Nagahama	Shadai Race Horse	1:53.0
2005	Koolinger	6	Ryuji Wada	Ichizo Iwamato	Susumu Hayashi	1:52.0
2006	Hishi Atlas	6	Norihiro Yokoyama	Takao Nakano	Masaichiro Abe	1:51.4
2007	Quiet Day	7	Koichi Tsunoda	Shoichi Matsumoto	Sunday Racing	1:51.4
2008	Nanayo Himawari	7	Yoshiyuki Obara	Isami Obara	Wasuke Ozaki	1:51.6
2009	Espoir City	4	Masami Matsuoka	Akio Adachi	Yushun Horse Club	1:51.9
2010	Makoto Sparviero	7	Hiroki Goto	Ippo Sameshima	Akira Makabe	1:51.9
2011	Testa Matta	5	Hirofumi Shii	Akira Murayama	Kazumi Yoshida	1:50.0
2012	Silent Melody	5	Hiroki Goto	Sakae Kunieda	Shadai Race Horse	1:51.0
2013	Grand City	6	Akihide Tsumura	Ikuo Aizawa	Yushun Horse Club	1:52.6
2014	Solor	4	Masayoshi Ebina	Kazuya Nakatake	Sunday Racing	1:51.2
2015	Meiner Crop	5	Yuji Tannai	Yuzo Iida	Thoroughbred Club Ruffian	1:52.7
2016	Shonan Apollon	6	Masami Matsuoka	Fumiaki Koga	Tetsuhide Kunimoto	1:52.7
2017	Incantation	7	Masaki Katsuura	Tomohiko Hatsuki	Turf Sport	1:52.0
2018	Centurion	6	Hideaki Miyuki	Yauhito Tamura	Yasushi Kubota	1:52.1
2019	Satono Titan	6	Shu Ihibashi	Noriyuki Hori	Haruki Satomi	1:52.3
2020	Suave Aramis	5	Kota Fujioka	Naosuke Sugai	NICKS	1:51.3
2021	Rapier Wit	6	Shu Ihibashi	Noriyuki Hori	Kaneko Makoto Holdings	1:51.0
2022	Meisho Hario	5	Suguru Hamanaka	Inao Okada	Yoshio Matsumoto	1:50.2
2023	Hayabusa Nandekun	7	Akihide Tsumura	Keiji Yoshimura	Osamu Takeda	1:51.4
2024	Walzer Schall	5	Arata Saito	Noboru Takagi	West Forest Stable	1:50.7
2025	Brian Sense	5	Mirai Iwata	Makoto Saito	Masamichi Hayashi	1:51.5
2026	Sunday Funday	6	Yamato Tsunoda	Akishi Higashida	Yoshizawa Holdings	1:51.2

== See also ==
- Horse racing in Japan
- List of Japanese flat horse races
