= Miyako Stakes =

Horse Race

Miyako Stakes みやこステークス
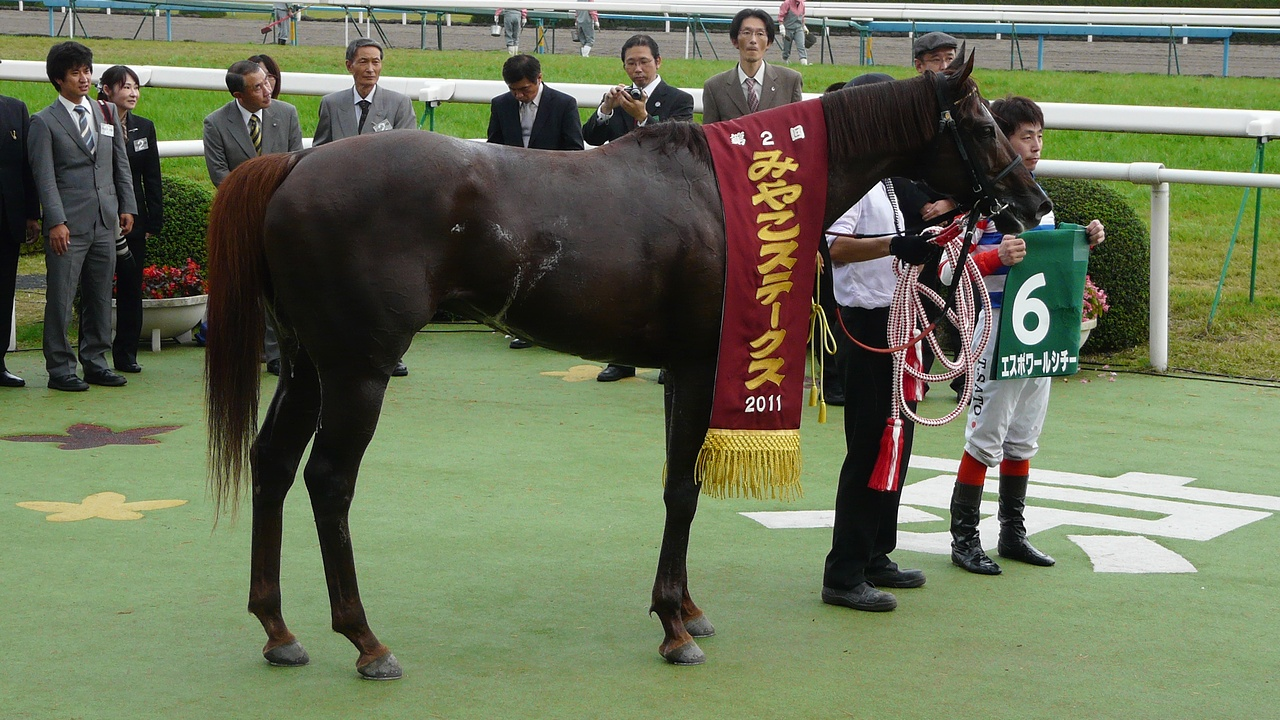
- The 2011 winner Espoir City
- Class: Grade 3
- Location: Kyoto Racecourse
- Inaugurated: 2010
- Race type: Thoroughbred Flat racing

Race information
- Distance: 1800 metres
- Surface: Dirt
- Track: Right-handed
- Qualification: 3-y-o+
- Weight: Special Weight
- Purse: ¥ 86,400,000 (as of 2026): 1st: ¥ 40,000,000; 2nd: ¥ 16,000,000; 3rd: ¥ 10,000,000

The Miyako Stakes (Japanese みやこステークス) is a Japanese Grade 3 horse race for Thoroughbreds aged three and over, run in November over a distance of 1800 metres on dirt at Kyoto Racecourse.

The race was originally named the Topaz Stakes from 1986 until 2009, with the inaugural race being run on a turf track over a distance of 1400 metres, before the distance was extended to 2000 metres from 1984 to 1996. The race became a dirt race in 1997, and was later promoted to Grade 3 status in 2010 and renamed to Miyako Stakes. The race serves as a trial for the Champions Cup, which is run in early December, with the winner given an entry slot in the race since 2014.

The race was not held in 2018 as the Japan Breeding Farms' Cup Classic (as well as the Sprint and Ladies' Classics) were held instead that year.

== Weight ==
55 kg for three-year-olds, 57 kg for four-year-olds and above.

Allowances:

- 2 kg for fillies / mares
- 2 kg for southern hemisphere bred three-year-olds

Penalties (excluding two-year-old race performance):

- If a graded stakes race has been won within a year:
  - 2 kg for a grade 1 win (1 kg for fillies / mares)
  - 1 kg for a grade 2 win
- If a graded stakes race has been won for more than a year:
  - 1 kg for a grade 1 win

== Previous winners ==
Year	Winner	Age	Jockey	Trainer	Owner	Time
Topaz Stakes
1983	Nihon Pillow Winner	3	Hiroshi Kawachi	Masatoshi Hattori	Hyakutaro Kobayashi	1:22.7
1984	Long Leather	3	Hiroshi Kawachi	Hikosaburo Nagahama	Choichi Nakai	2:04.6
1985	Royal Cosmah	3	Seiki Tabara	Kuniichi Asami	Atsuko Uchida	2:05.2
1986	Suzutaka Hero	4	Katsuhide Maruyama	Masahiro Sakaguchi	Takashi Suzuki	2:01.7
1987	Hashiken ELDO	4	Tatsuya Matsumoto	Tadashi Nakao	Hiroshi Hashimoto	2:02.5
1988	Happy Suzuran	3	Seiki Tabara	Saburo Yuasa	Momoko Yanai	2:02.1
1989	Marron Glace	5	Junichiro Oka	Hozumi Shono	Hideo Kuribayashi	2:00.8
1990	Dai Yusaku	5	Shigefumi Kumazawa	Shigeharu Naito	Kohei Hashimoto	2:00.1
1991	Lucky Guerlain	5	Koichi Uchida	Royal Farm	Royal Farm	2:06.4
1992	Osumi Roch	5	Tatsuya Matsumoto	Tadashi Nakao	Hidenori Yamaji	2:00.3
1993	Towa Nagon	4	Hideo Koyauchi	Masaru Sayama	Ichiro Saito	2:00.8
1994	Tamamo Highway	4	Hirofumi Shii	Shinobu Yoshinaga	Tamamo	1:59.6
1995	Yutosei	5	Katsumi Shiomura	Norihiro Tanaka	Aitetsu	2:00.9
1996	Yutosei	6	Katsumi Shiomura	Norihiro Tanaka	Aitetsu	2:00.4
1997	Premium Thunder	3	Yutaka Take	Makoto Osawa	Hiroaki Nakanishi	1:48.4
1998	Osumi Jet	4	Hirofumi Shii	Toshiaki Shirai	Hidenori Yamaji	1:50.5
1999	World Cleek	4	Kazuhiro Kato	Hitoshi Arai	International Horse	1:51.6
2000	Hokusetsu King	4	Shinichiro Akiyama	Masayuki Sakata	Shobu Hirashima	1:50.2
2001	Tamamo Ruby King	4	Tetsuya Kobayashi	Yoshihiko Kawamura	Tamamo	1:51.3
2002	Air Pierre	6	Shinji Fujita	Yasuhito Tamura	Lucky Field	1:52.2
2003	Time Paradox	5	Katsumi Ando	Hiroyoshi Matsuda	Shadai Race Horse	1:51.6
2004	Ancient Hill	3	Kenichi Shono	Shigeki Matsumoto	Carrot Farm	1:50.7
2005	Bellagio	6	Mikio Matsunaga	Keiji Takaichi	Kaneko Makoto Holdings	1:50.3
2006	Cafe Olympus	5	Hirofumi Shii	Yasuhisa Matsuyama	Koichi Nishikawa	1:50.9
2007	Long Pride	3	Yutaka Take	Yukiharu Ono	Toshio Nakai	1:51.3
2008	Espoir City	3	Tetsuzo Sato	Akio Adachi	Yushun Horse Club	1:50.8
2009	Silk Mobius	3	Hiroyasu Tanaka	Masazo Ryoke	Silk Racing	1:49.6
Miyako Stakes
2010	Transcend	4	Shinji Fujita	Takayuki Yasuda	Koji Maeda	1:49.8
2011	Espoir City	6	Tetsuzo Sato	Akio Adachi	Yushun Horse Club	1:48.4
2012	Roman Legend	4	Yasunari Iwata	Hideaki Fujiwara	Yoshimi Ota	1:49.6
2013	Brightline	4	Yuichi Fukunaga	Ippo Sameshima	North Hills	1:49.2
2014	Incantation	4	Takuya Ono	Tomohiko Hatsuki	Turf Sport	1:50.2
2015	Roi Jardin	4	Suguru Hamanaka	Hirofumi Toda	Shadai Race Horse	1:47.8
2016	Apollo Kentucky	4	Fuma Matsukawa	Kenji Yamauchi	Apollo Thoroughbred Club	1:50.1
2017	T M Jinsoku	5	Yoshihiro Furakawa	Kazuyoshi Kihara	Masatsugu Takezono	1:50.1
2018	no race					
2019	Vengeance	6	Hideaki Miyuki	Hiroyuki Oneda	Junzo Miyagawa	1:49.1
2020	Clincher	6	Yuga Kawada	Hiroshi Miyamoto	Koji Maeda	1:49.9 (Note: The races from 2020 to 2022 were held at Hanshin Racecourse due to renovations at Kyoto Racecourse)
2021	Meisho Hario	4	Suguru Hamanaka	Inao Okada	Yoshio Matsumoto	1:50.8 (Note: The races from 2020 to 2022 were held at Hanshin Racecourse due to renovations at Kyoto Racecourse)
2022	Sunrise Hope	5	Hideaki Miyuki	Tomohiko Hatsuki	Takao Matsuoka	1:51.6 (Note: The races from 2020 to 2022 were held at Hanshin Racecourse due to renovations at Kyoto Racecourse)
2023	Seraphic Call	3	Mirco Demuro	Ryo Terashima	Carrot Farm	1:50.9
2024	Sunrise Zipangu	3	Katsuma Sameshima	Hidetaka Otonashi	Life House	1:49.7
2025	W Heart Bond	4	Ryusei Sakai	Ryuji Okubo	Silk Racing	1:47.5 (Note: Set the track record)
2026	Lord Couronne	5	Kazuo Yokoyama	Hirofumi Shii	Lord Horse Club Co. Ltd.	1:49.6

== See also ==
- Horse racing in Japan
- List of Japanese flat horse races
