= Kyoto Racecourse =

Horse racing venue in Kyoto, Japan

Kyoto Racecourse; 京都競馬場
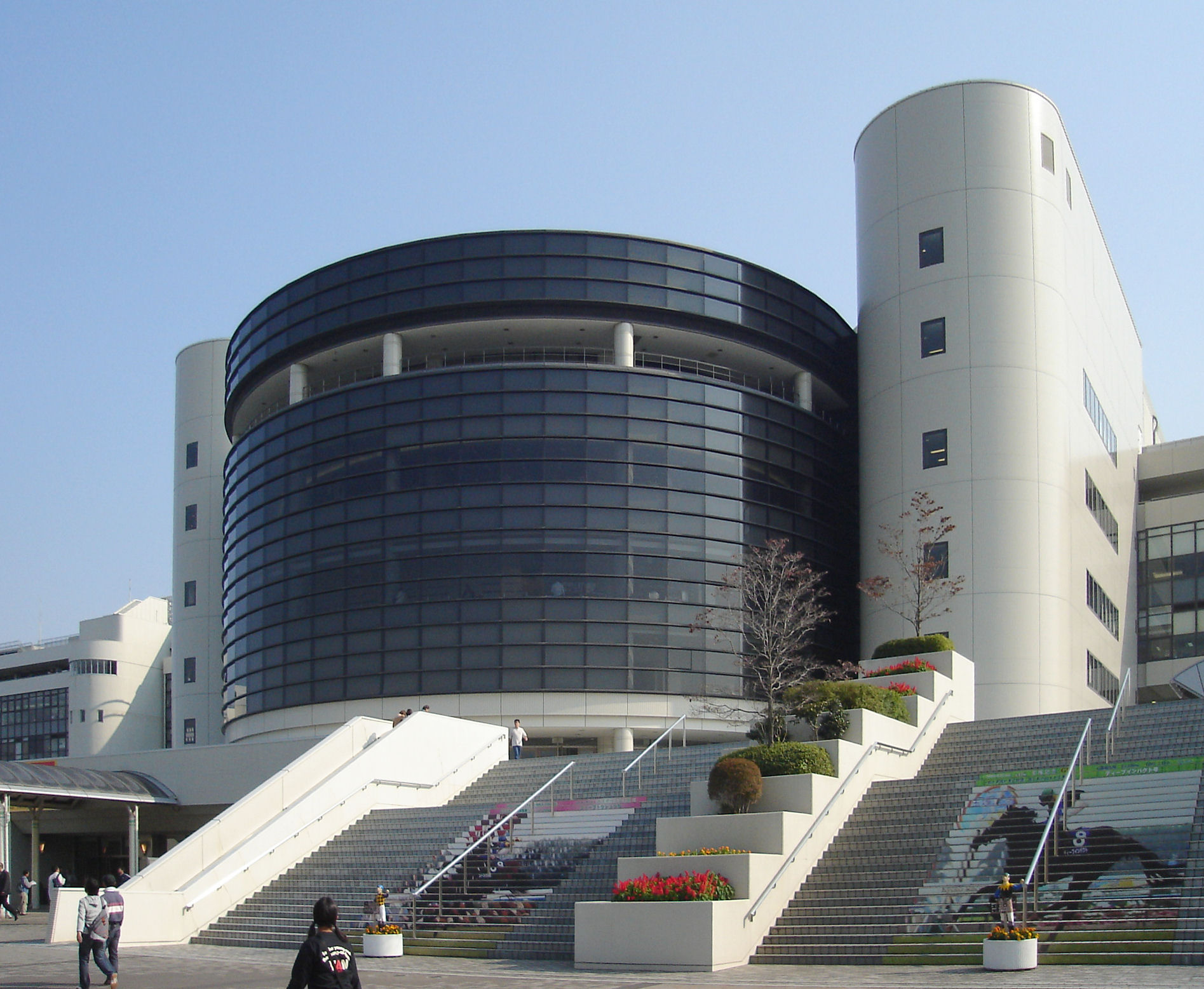
- Hall building in 2006
- Interactive map of: Kyoto Racecourse; 京都競馬場
- Location: Fushimi-ku, Kyoto, Japan
- Coordinates: 34°54′24″N 135°43′30″E
- Owned by: Japan Racing Association
- Date opened: December 1, 1925
- Capacity: 120,000
- Screened on: KBS Kyoto; Kansai TV (Sun); TVG Network (USA)
- Course type: Flat, Steeplechase
- Notable races: Kikuka Sho; Tennō Shō (Spring); Shuka Sho; Queen Elizabeth II Commemorative Cup; Mile Championship

Map

Kyoto Racecourse (京都競馬場, Kyōto-keibajō) is located in Fushimi-ku, Kyoto, Kyoto Prefecture, Japan. It is used for horse racing. It has a capacity of 120,000. The current stand was built in 1999.

== History ==
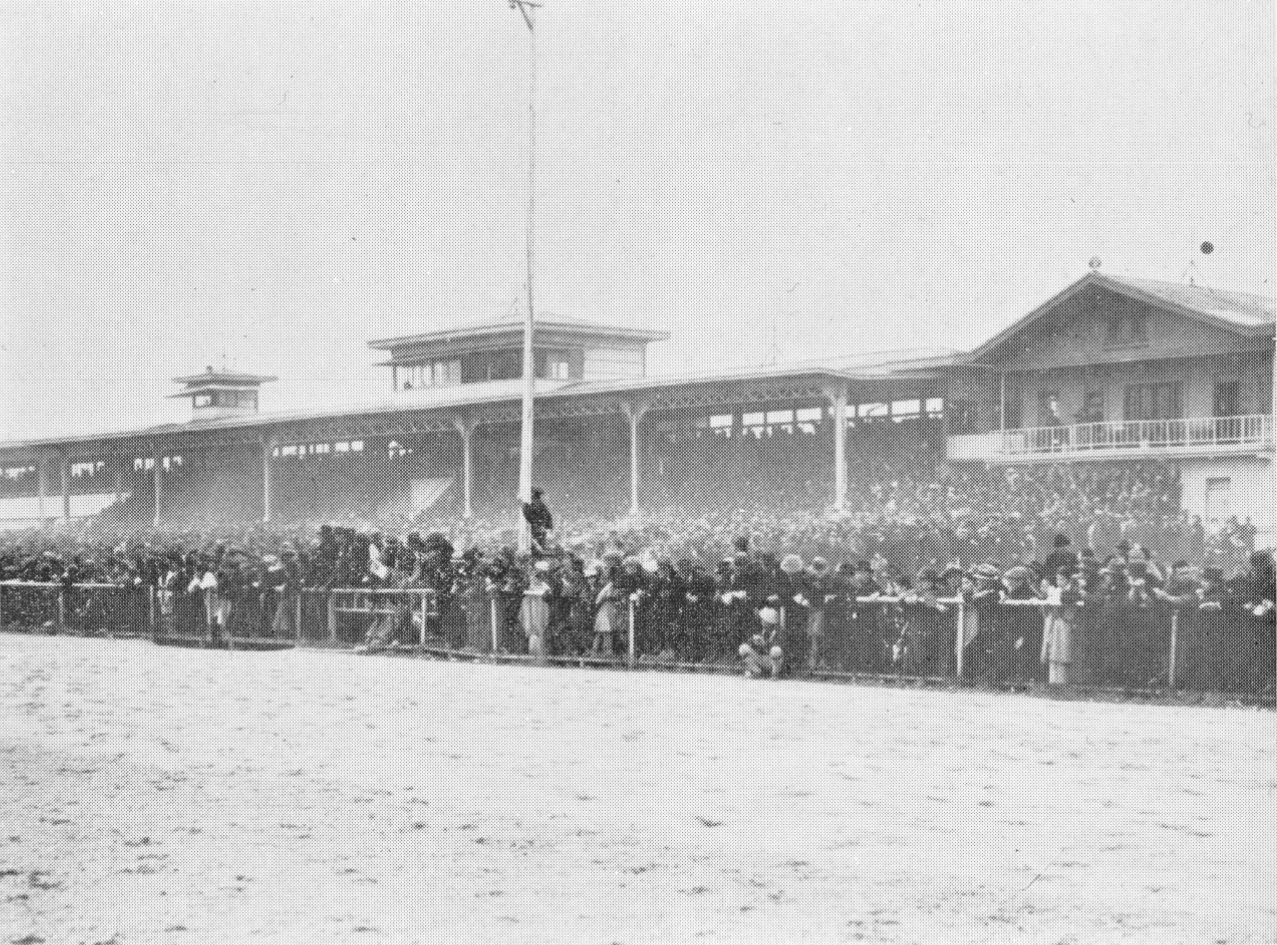
Main stand (1925–1937)

Kyoto Racecourse opened at its current location in December 1, 1925.

In preparation for the track's 100th anniversary, Kyoto Race Course closed from November 2020 until the Spring of 2023 for grandstand renovations. Races normally run at Kyoto moved to either Hanshin Racecourse or Chukyo Racecourse during this time. Kyoto Racecourse finally reopened after renovations on 22 April 2023.

== Physical attributes ==
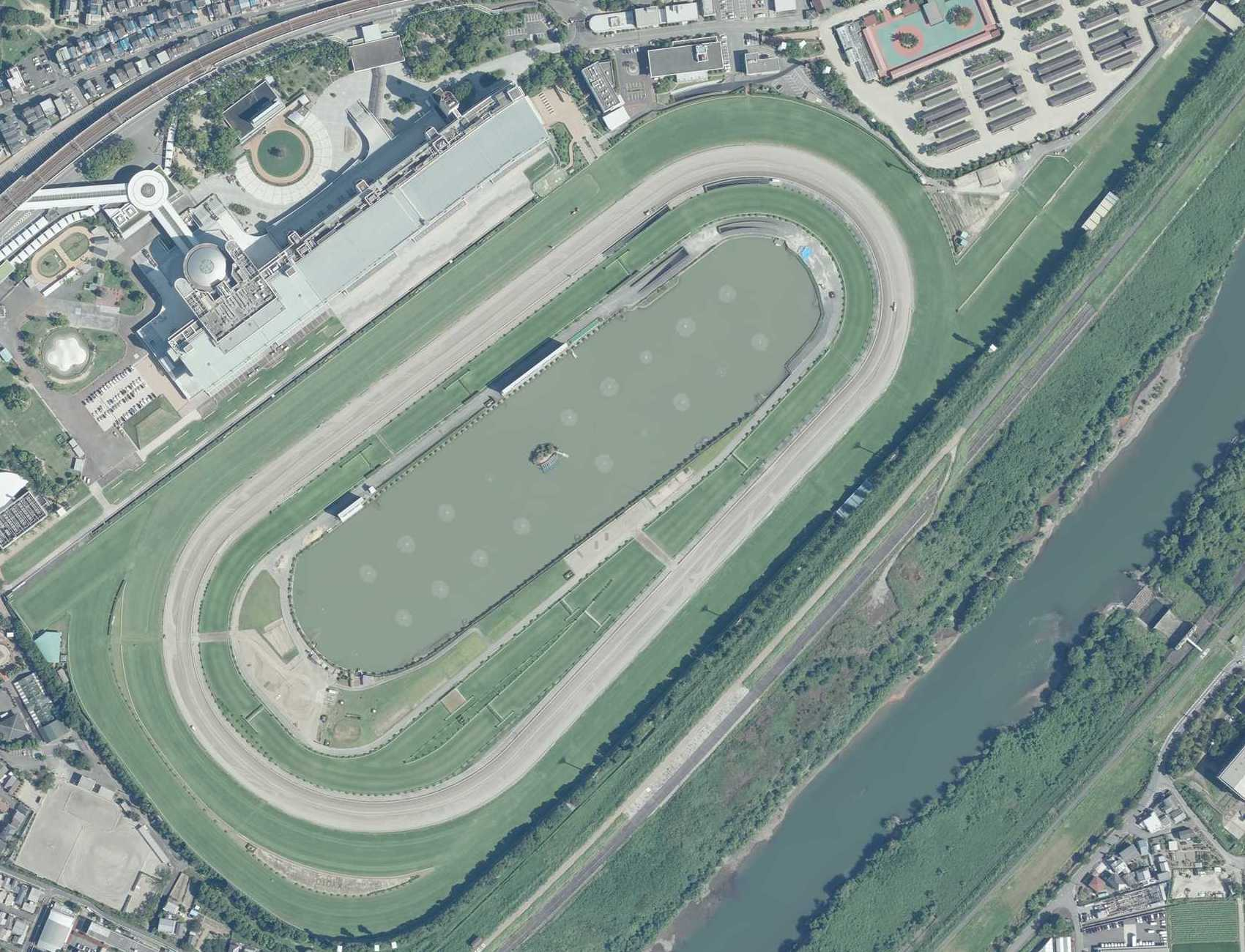
Aerial photograph

Kyoto Race Course has two turf courses, a dirt course, and a jump course.

The turf's outer oval (外回り, sotomawari) measures 1894m and the inner oval (内回り, uchimawari) measures 1783m . A chute permits races to be run on either oval at distances between 1400m and 1800m. Races can be run on the "A Course" rail setting (on the hedge), the "B Course" setting (rail out 4 meters), the "C Course" setting (rail out 7 metres) or the "D Course" setting (rail out 10 meters).

The dirt course measures 1608 metres, with a 1400m chute.

Source: Japan Association for International Racing and Stud Book, Kyoto Racecourse

== Notable races ==
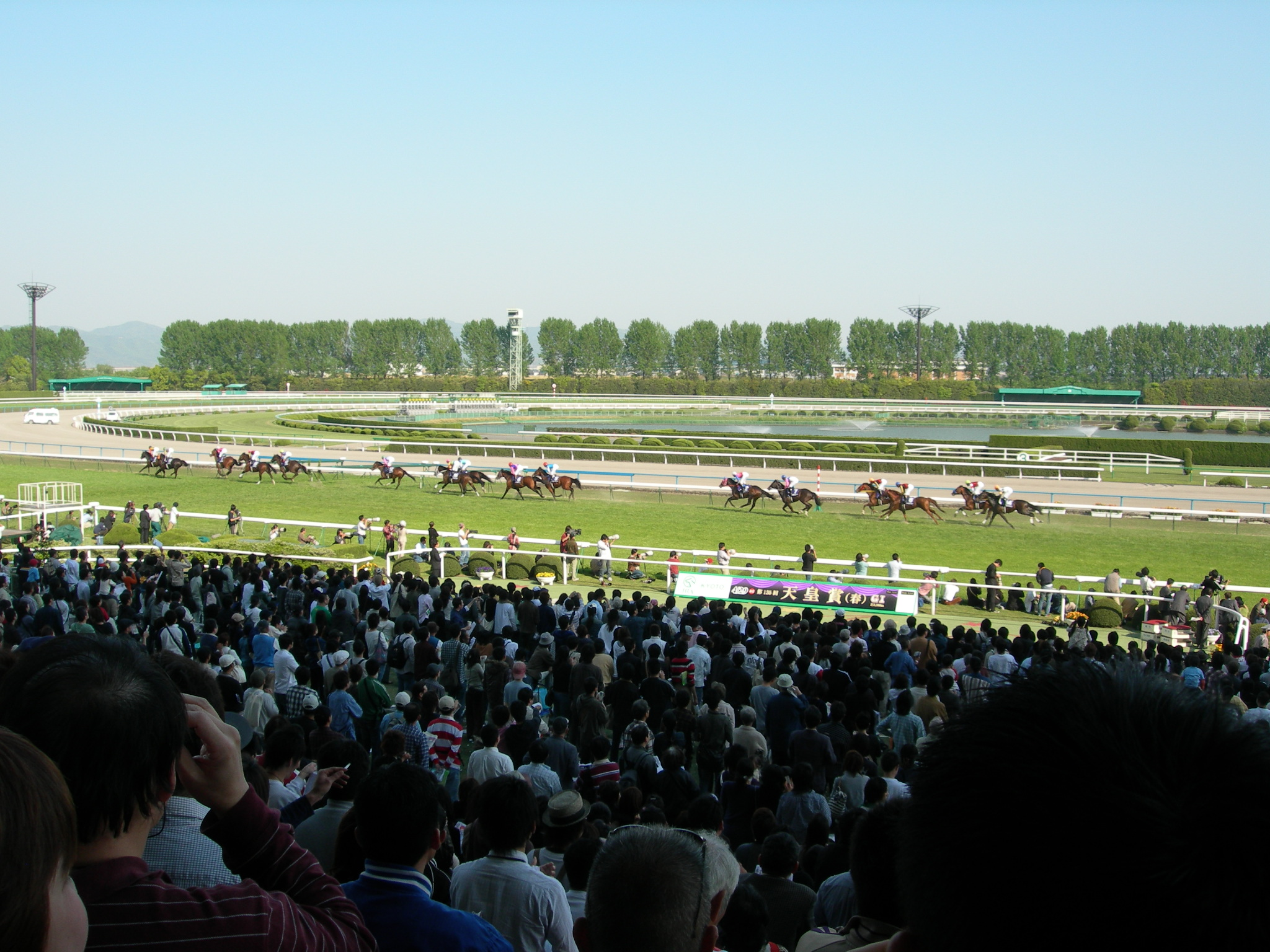
Tenno Sho in 2007

Month	Race	Distance	Age/Sex
Grade I
Apr./May.	Tennō Shō (Spring)	Turf 3200m	4yo +
Oct.	Shuka Sho	Turf 2000m	3yo f
Oct.	Kikuka Sho (Japanese St. Leger)	Turf 3000m	3yo c&f
Nov.	Queen Elizabeth II Cup	Turf 2200m	3yo + f
Nov.	Mile Championship	Turf 1600m	3yo +
Grade II
Jan.	Nikkei Shinshun Hai (Handicap)	Turf 2400m	4yo +
Feb.	Kyoto Kinen	Turf 2200m	4yo +
Apr.	Yomiuri Milers Cup (Yasuda Kinen Trial)	Turf 1600m	4yo +
May	Kyoto Shimbun Hai	Turf 2200m	3yo
Oct.	Kyoto Daishoten (Tenno Sho Trial)	Turf 2400m	3yo +
Oct.	Swan Stakes (Mile Championship Trial)	Turf 1400m	3yo +
Oct.	Daily Hai Nisai Stakes	Turf 1600m	2yo
Grade III
Jan.	Kyoto Kimpai (Handicap)	Turf 1600m	4yo +
Jan.	Shinzan Kinen	Turf 1600m	3yo
Jan/Feb.	Silk Road Stakes (Handicap)	Turf 1200m	4yo +
Feb.	Kisaragi Sho (NHK Sho)	Turf 1800m	3yo
Apr.	Unicorn Stakes	Dirt 1900m	3yo
May	Heian Stakes	Dirt 1900m	4yo +
Nov.	Miyako Stakes (Champions Cup Trial)	Dirt 1800m	3yo +
Nov.	Fantasy Stakes	Turf 1400m	2yo f
Nov.	Keihan Hai	Turf 1200m	3yo +
Nov.	Kyoto Nisai Stakes	Turf 2000m	2yo
J-Grade II (Steeplechase)
May	Kyoto High-Jump	Turf 3930m	3yo +
J-Grade III (Steeplechase)
Nov	Kyoto Jump Stakes	Turf 3170m	4yo +

== Track records ==
Source：レコードタイム表 (Record time table) -> 京都競馬場 (Kyoto Racecourse)

- † Reference Time.
- Last updated on October 15, 2026.

=== Turf course (2yo) ===
Distance	Time	Racehorse	Sex	Weight	Jockey	Date Recorded
1100m	1:05.0	Yamapit	Filly	50kg	Yasuo Ikee	September 4, 1966
1200m	1:08.0	A Shin Whity	Colt	52kg	Kyosuke Kokubun	November 7, 2009
1400m	1:20.2	Margot Love Me	Filly	55kg	Kenichi Ikezoe	October 11, 2025
Outer 1400m	1:20.3	Aston Machan	Filly	54kg	Yutaka Take	November 5, 2006
1600m	1:32.3	Mikki Isle	Colt	55kg	Suguru Hamanaka	November 2, 2013
Outer 1600m	1:33.1	Admire Quads	Colt	56kg	Ryusei Sakai	November 15, 2025
1800m	1:45.5	Ippei	Colt	56kg	Suguru Hamanaka	October 3, 2026
2000m	1:59.1	On Your Marks	Colt	56kg	Yutaka Take	October 11, 2026

=== Turf course (3yo+) ===
Distance	Time	Racehorse	Sex	Weight	Jockey	Date Recorded
1100m	1:07.5	Kitakami	Colt 3	52kg	Izumi Shimizu	January 9, 1966
1200m	1:06.4	Flicker Jab	Colt 4	57kg	Kohei Matsuyama	May 16, 2026
1400m	1:19.9	A Shin Pepelatz	Colt 3	56kg	Yutaka Take	April 26, 2014
Outer 1400m	1:18.9	Off Trail	Colt 4	57kg	Akira Sugawara	October 13, 2025
1600m	1:32.2	Chuwano Kiseki	Colt 3	56kg	Kohei Matsuyama	May 9, 2020
Outer 1600m	1:31.3	Sungrazer	Colt 4	57kg	Yuichi Fukunaga	April 22, 2018
1800m	1:43.4	Gaiamente	Horse 5	56kg	Taisei Danno	May 24, 2026
2000m	1:56.1	Bullet Pass	Colt 3	56kg	Kiwamu Ogino	October 3, 2026
Outer 2000m	2:00.2	El Casa River	Filly 3	55kg	Masato Shibata	October 25, 1992
2200m	2:09.7	Neptunite	Colt 4	55kg	Andrasch Starke	April 21, 2019
2400m	2:22.2	Bay Rum	Colt 4	58kg	Seinosuke Yoshimura	May 17, 2026
3000m	3:01.0	Toho Jackal	Colt 3	57kg	Manabu Sakai	October 26, 2014
3200m	3:12.5	Kitasan Black	Horse 5	58kg	Yutaka Take	April 30, 2017

=== Dirt course (2yo) ===
Distance	Time	Racehorse	Sex	Weight	Jockey	Date Recorded
1100m	1:06.5†	Long Sovereign	Colt	53kg	Katsumi Minai	August 29, 1982
1200m	1:10.7	American Stage	Colt	56kg	Yuichi Kitamura	November 2, 2024
1400m	1:23.3	Ca Va	Colt	55kg	Yuichi Fukunaga	October 18, 2020
1800m	1:51.0	Big Smoky	Colt	55kg	Suguru Hamanaka	November 18, 2017

=== Dirt course (3yo+) ===
Distance	Time	Racehorse	Sex	Weight	Jockey	Date Recorded
1200m	1:09.0	Mont Perdu	Filly 3	51kg	Fuma Matsuwaka	October 19, 2019
1400m	1:21.7	Best Warrior	Colt 4	56kg	Suguru Hamanaka	February 8, 2014
1800m	1:47.5	W Heart Bond	Filly 4	55kg	Ryusei Sakai	November 9, 2025
1900m	1:53.7	Wonder Acute	Horse 5	57kg	Ryuji Wada	May 22, 2011
2600m	2:43.3†	Erimo Roller	Horse 5	57kg	Shigetoshi Saruhashi	January 22, 1984

== See also ==
- Yodo Station - Keihan Electric Railway Keihan Main Line
