= W Heart Bond =

Japanese thoroughbred racehorse

W Heart Bond; ダブルハートボンド
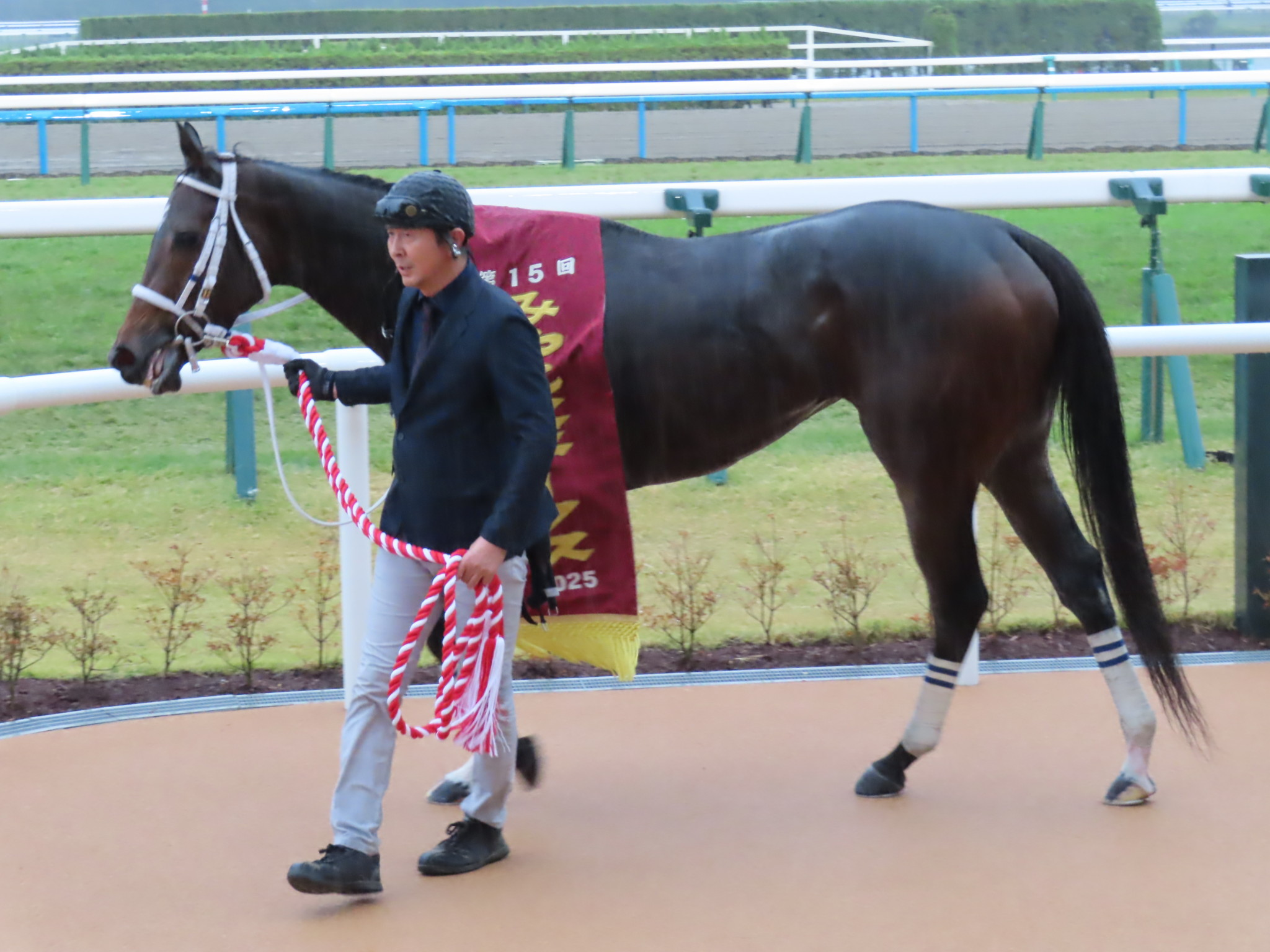
- W Heart Bond after winning the 2025 Miyako Stakes
- Breed: Thoroughbred
- Sire: Kizuna
- Grandsire: Deep Impact
- Dam: Persistently
- Damsire: Smoke Glacken
- Sex: Filly
- Foaled: February 3, 2021 (age 5)
- Country: Japan
- Color: Bay
- Breeder: Northern Farm
- Owner: Silk Racing
- Racing colors
- Trainer: Ryuji Okubo
- Jockey: Ryusei Sakai
- Record: 10: 7-1-1
- Earnings: ¥287,592,000

Major wins
- Miyako Stakes (2025); Champions Cup (2025)
- Last updated on October 6, 2026

W Heart Bond (Japanese: ダブルハートボンド, Hepburn: Daburu Hāto Bondo; foaled February 3, 2021) is a Japanese Thoroughbred racehorse. She won her first graded stakes at the 2025 Miyako Stakes before continued that form and gained her first G1 win at the 2025 Champions Cup.

== Background ==
W Heart Bond was foaled out of Persistently, who was sired by the 1997 American Champion Sprint Horse, Smoke Glacken. She was sired by the 2013 Tokyo Yushun winner, Kizuna who was a sire of several other G1 winning horses such as Songline and Justin Milano.

In 2022, he was offered to Silk Racing on the name of "Persistently 21" at the price of 40 million yen (80,000 yen per share). Northern farm CEO at that time, Sugawara Ko described and hoped that the horse grew well in his quote, "We encouraged growth without pushing her too hard during the winter. She's getting better now that it's warmer. We're planning to gradually increase the pace. She has a light and beautiful running style. She seems to do well on light turf. She has explosive speed and is very easy to handle. She seems to have a wide range of distances she can handle. She's still young, but she makes me want to see her compete in the Classics. We hope to send her out in July or August. She's a horse that will get even better from here on out."

She was named as the meant of "connection of two loves", which was the inspired from her sire's name (Kizuna which meant bond) and the horse's physique (her markings on the head resembled two hearts conjoined together).

== Racing career ==
=== 2024: three-year-old season ===
She debuted on 18th of August in the 1800 metres dirt race at Chukyo Racecourse, under the helm of Ryusei Sakai as her jockey. During the race, the horse easily settled into second place and took the lead before the fourth turn. She quickly widened the gap between itself and the rest of the field to win the race by six lengths over Pop Star. For the next race, she nailed a good start, led from the gate and accelerated away from the pack at the fourth corner to win her second race in succession. However, she was diagnosed with a fracture at her third carpal bone in her left fore leg after the race. This injury subsided her for the whole season.

=== 2025: four-year-old season ===
She returned for the new season at the Ena Tokubetsu, still with Sakai at her helm. Starting from the far outside gate, she quickly moved to the front and chased down T O Ruby and Miyaji Regalia. In the straight, she was in a battle with Miyaji Regalia but prevailed and pulled away to win her third consecutive race. W Heart Bond continued her form with a great performance at the Maizuru Stakes as she positioned herself in second place during the race, keeping an eye on the leader, Bastard Saffron. She took the lead with about 200 metres to go and held off the rest of the field to win her fourth race out of four starts since debut and moved up to the open class. For her first start in the open class, she ran in the Sannomiya Stakes at Hanshin Racecourse on June. In this race, she was marking the leader, Leander at second place in early phase. At the final stretch, she responded to Sakai's whip and dashed forward for the lead. Although Vanyar tried to close her down, W Heart Bond held on to win the race by a neck.

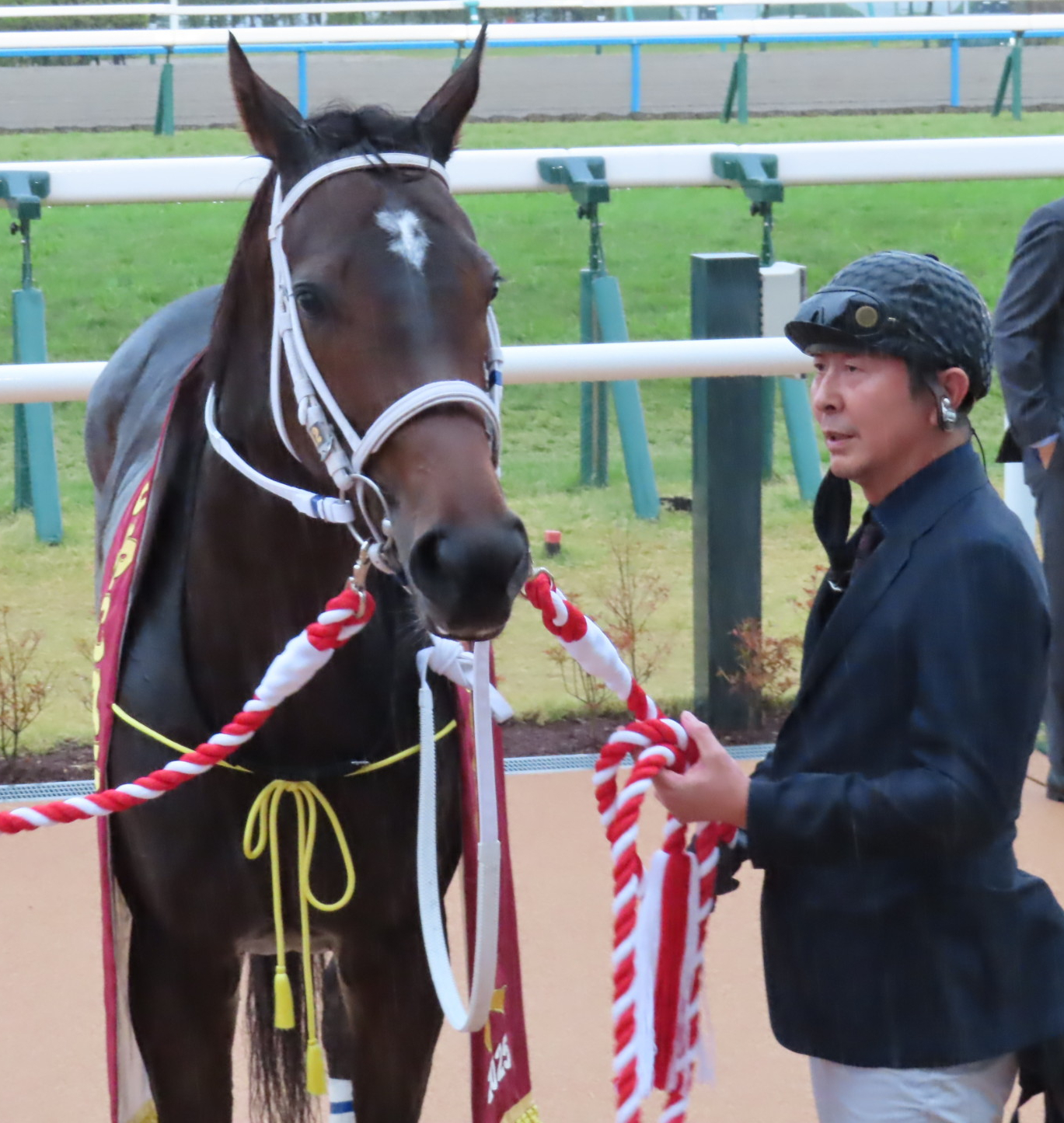
The horse, whose name is derived from the markings on its forehead that resemble two hearts joined together and her groom, Akira Hirako at the 15th Miyako Stakes awards ceremony

Her next race would be decided to be at the Breeders' Gold Cup, a JPN III race which would marked her first graded race since debut. When the gates opened, she took the lead despite being closely marked by Awesome Result and led the pack. She maintained the lead until the very end but was overtaken by Riot Grrrl who came up hard from behind and finished second. Speaking on her first lost ever, Sakai stated, "It was her first time racing at night and on the white sand, and it wasn't a problem at all. She was able to go at an easy pace and maintain a good rhythm. The winning horse just had a better finishing kick." Her next race was initially to be the JBC Ladies' Classic but as she was excluded due to lack of prize money offered, she was pivoted into the Miyako Stakes instead. In the early stages, her jockey pushed her hard, and she was in contention for the lead with Revontulet. She settled into second place at the second corner. Reaching the third corner, W Heart Bond took the lead and pulled away from the rest of the field towards the final straight. Saimon Xanadu came up from behind and challenged her, but she held on to win her first graded stakes race and doing so in a record time. She was also the first filly to win said race.

Her next race for the year would be the season-ending race which was the Champions Cup at Chukyo Racecourse, her first G1 races where she aimed to become the first filly to win it since Sambista in 2015. For this race, she was the third favourite behind Narukami and Luxor Cafe. In the beginning, she broke out well from stall 2, traveled two-wide in third and rounded the final corners wide to enter the lane in good striking position. The four-year-old filly produced an impressive turn of speed in the stretch to seize the lead with 300 metres to go and engaged in a gripping duel with fast-closing Wilson Tesoro over the final 100 metres. W Heart Bond held off her rival with tenacity to ultimately prevailed in a photo finish. The final margin of victory was a nose. This would be the first filly win since 2015 and also his jockey, Ryusei Sakai's third consecutive win of the competition (adding up to his previous two edition win with Lemon Pop). Sakai said she showed an incredible heart on the day as she utilized her real strength to the end.

=== 2026: five-year-old season ===
As the new season begun, W Heart Bond were tipped as the favourite to win the February Stakes after the team declined the invitation to run at the Saudi Cup. During the early part, she settled nicely in around fourth or fifth position and had a clear path along the center lane after rounding the final corner. She gained ground impressively to engage in a four-horse rally with the eventual winner, Costa Nova, Wilson Tesoro and Brian Sense from the furlong pole to the wire. She was beaten to third by both Costa Nova and Wilson Tesoro but managed to cross the wire three-quarters of a length in front of Brian Sense. Sakai stated after the race that a slight start on the turf made her a bit sluggish at times but all in all admitted that W Heart Bond was still a strong horse that was capable to winning races.

The horse was off the racetrack for seven and a half months before returning in October at the Ladies Prelude in Ohi. Sakai stayed as her jockey as she was drawn to start from gate 2 as the favourite on the day. When the race began, W Heart Bond composed herself and ran calmly in the leading group. She maintained the pace as they approached the final straight. Still, she failed to extend her acceleration as Memoria Cafe overtook her from the outside whilst she slowed down to finish in fourth on the line, her first finish outside of the podium. Post-race, Sakai declared that the horse was good in training and was surprised she did not respond to his cue at the end, but hoped that the horse could make her comeback in the next race.

== Racing form ==
W Heart Bond won seven races, finished second once and third once out of ten starts. This data is available based on JBIS and netkeiba.

Date	Track	Race	Grade	Distance (Condition)	Entry	HN	Odds (Favored)	Finish	Time	Margins	Jockey	Winner (Runner-up)
2024 – three-year-old season
Aug 18	Chukyo	3yo Newcomer		1,800 m (Fast)	13	6	7.4 (4)	1st	1:53.2	–1.0	Ryusei Sakai	(Pop Star)
Sep 8	Chukyo	3yo+ Allowance	1W	1,800 m (Fast)	10	2	1.1 (1)	1st	1:51.2	–1.9	Ryusei Sakai	(Hihin)
2025 – four-year-old season
Jan 11	Chukyo	Ena Tokubetsu	ALW (2W)	1,800 m (Fast)	16	16	1.3 (1)	1st	1:52.6	–0.5	Ryusei Sakai	(Miyaji Regalia)
Feb 1	Kyoto	Maizuru Stakes	ALW (3W)	1,800 m (Fast)	12	6	1.6 (1)	1st	1:52.2	–0.6	Ryusei Sakai	(Nevermore)
Jun 14	Hanshin	Sannomiya Stakes	OP	1,800 m (Muddy)	12	12	1.8 (1)	1st	1:50.0	0.0	Ryusei Sakai	(Vanyar)
Aug 28	Mombetsu	Breeders' Gold Cup	JpnIII (Note: All Jpn graded races were labeled Listed (L) internationally)	2,000 m (Fast)	9	1	3.2 (2)	2nd	2:07.0	0.3	Ryusei Sakai	Riot Grrrl
Nov 9	Kyoto	Miyako Stakes	GIII	1,800 m (Sloppy)	15	12	6.0 (2)	1st	R1:47.5 (Note: R indicated that it was a record time finish)	0.0	Ryusei Sakai	(Saimon Xanadu)
Dec 7	Chukyo	Champions Cup	GI	1,800 m (Fast)	16	2	7.3 (3)	1st	1:50.2	0.0	Ryusei Sakai	(Wilson Tesoro)
2026 – five-year-old season
Feb 22	Tokyo	February Stakes	GI	1,600 m (Fast)	16	9	3.0 (1)	3rd	1:35.6	0.2	Ryusei Sakai	Costa Nova
Oct 6	Ohi	Ladies Prelude	JpnII	1,800 m (Fast)	13	2	1.4 (1)	4th	1:52.5	0.9	Ryusei Sakai	Memoria Cafe

Legend:
Dirt

== Pedigree ==
Pedigree of W Heart Bond (JPN), 2021
Sire Kizuna (JPN) 2011	Deep Impact (JPN); 2002	Sunday Silence	Halo
Sire Kizuna (JPN) 2011	Deep Impact (JPN); 2002	Sunday Silence	Wishing Well
Sire Kizuna (JPN) 2011	Deep Impact (JPN); 2002	Wind in Her Hair	Alzao
Sire Kizuna (JPN) 2011	Deep Impact (JPN); 2002	Wind in Her Hair	Burghclere
Sire Kizuna (JPN) 2011	Catequil (CAN); 1990	Storm Cat	Storm Bird
Sire Kizuna (JPN) 2011	Catequil (CAN); 1990	Storm Cat	Terlingua
Sire Kizuna (JPN) 2011	Catequil (CAN); 1990	Pacific Princess	Damascus
Sire Kizuna (JPN) 2011	Catequil (CAN); 1990	Pacific Princess	Fiji
Dam Persistently (USA) 2006 FNo : 20-b	Smoke Glacken (USA); 1994	Two Punch	Mr. Prospector
Dam Persistently (USA) 2006 FNo : 20-b	Smoke Glacken (USA); 1994	Two Punch	Heavenly Cause
Dam Persistently (USA) 2006 FNo : 20-b	Smoke Glacken (USA); 1994	Majesty's Crown	Magesterial
Dam Persistently (USA) 2006 FNo : 20-b	Smoke Glacken (USA); 1994	Majesty's Crown	Queen's Crown
Dam Persistently (USA) 2006 FNo : 20-b	Just Reward (USA); 1999	Deputy Minister	Vice Regent
Dam Persistently (USA) 2006 FNo : 20-b	Just Reward (USA); 1999	Deputy Minister	Mint Copy
Dam Persistently (USA) 2006 FNo : 20-b	Just Reward (USA); 1999	Heavenly Prize	Seeking The Gold
Dam Persistently (USA) 2006 FNo : 20-b	Just Reward (USA); 1999	Heavenly Prize	Oh What a Dance

- W Heart Bond is an inbred by 4 x 5 to Mr. Prospector (Seeking The Gold's sire) and 5 x 5 x 5 to Northern Dancer (Storm Bird's, Magesterial's and Vice Regent's sire)
