= Chukyo Kinen =

Chukyo Kinen 中京記念
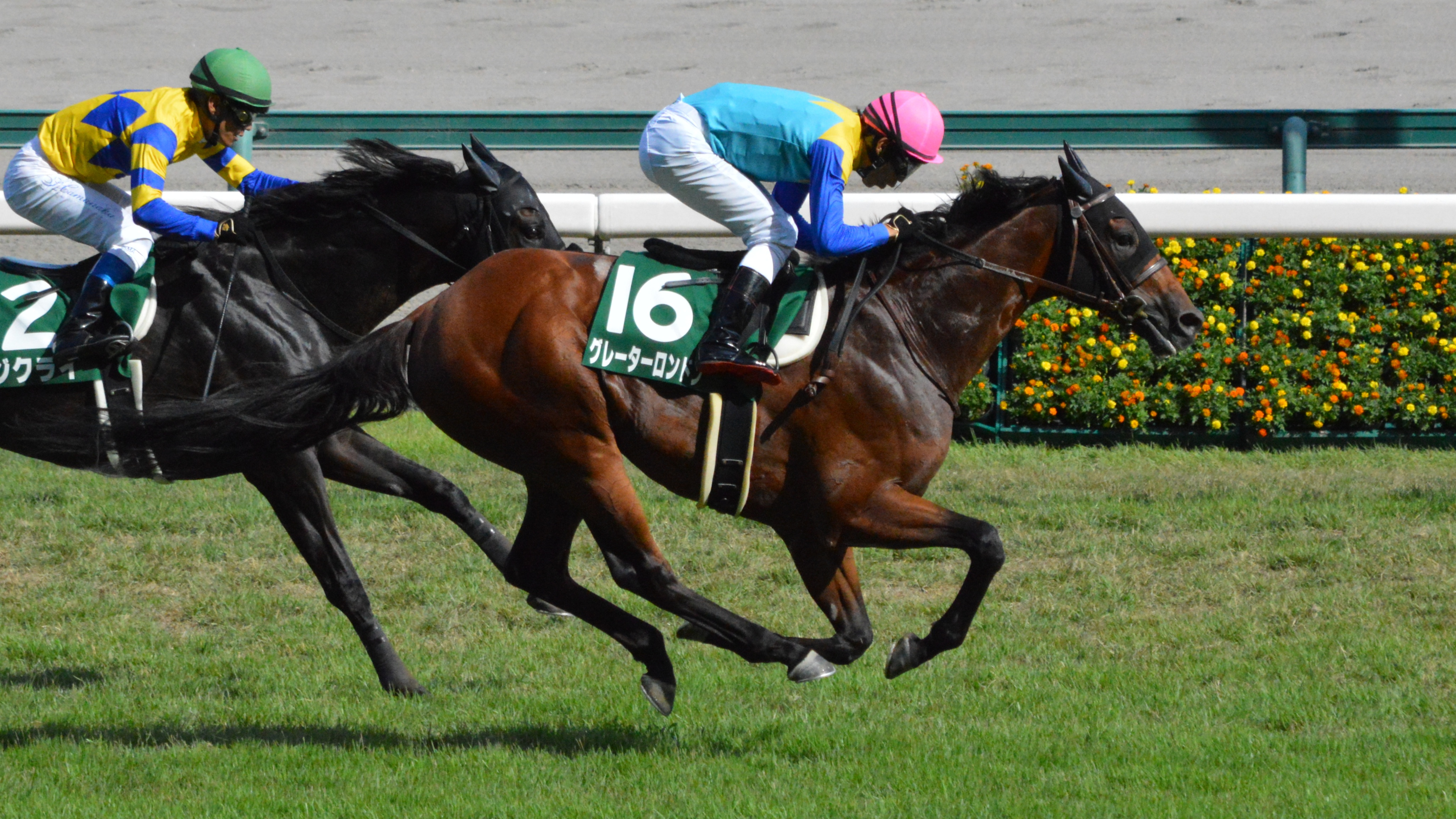
- Greater London wins the 2018 Chukyo Kinen.
- Class: Grade 3
- Location: Chukyo Racecourse
- Inaugurated: 1953
- Race type: Thoroughbred Flat racing

Race information
- Distance: 1600 metres
- Surface: Turf
- Track: Left-handed
- Qualification: 3-y-o+
- Weight: Handicap
- Purse: ¥ 87,960,000 (as of 2025): 1st: ¥ 41,000,000; 2nd: ¥ 16,000,000; 3rd: ¥ 10,000,000

The Chukyo Kinen (Japanese: 中京記念) is a Grade 3 horse race for Thoroughbreds aged three and over, run in July over a distance of 1600 metres on turf at Chukyo Racecourse.

It was first run in 1953 and has held Grade 3 status since 1984. The race was usually run over 2000 metres before being reduced to its current distance in 2012. It was run at Kokura Racecourse in 1991, 1993, 1994, 2011, 2021, 2022, and 2024. The race was run at Hanshin Racecourse in 2020 as well.

== Winners since 2000 ==
Year	Winner	Age	Jockey	Trainer	Owner	Time
2000	Meisho Doto	4	Yasuhiko Yasuda	Isao Yasuda	Yoshio Matsumoto	1:59.1
2001	Lord Cronos	6	Yukio Okabe	Kazuo Fujisawa	Lord Horse Club	1:59.7
2002	Tsurumaru Boy	4	Hiroshi Kawachi	Kojiro Hashiguchi	Takao Tsuruta	1:59.4
2003	Tagano My Bach	4	Katsumi Ando	Hiroyoshi Matsuda	Ryoji Yagi	2:00.1
2004	Meisho Kio	7	Shinichiro Akiyama	Masaru Fukushima	Yoshio Matsumoto	1:58.6
2005	Mega Stardom	6	Mikio Matsunaga	Shoji Yamamoto	North Hills Management	1:59.5
2006	Machikane Aura	4	Yuga Kawada	Yuji Ito	Masuo Hosokawa	1:58.2
2007	Rosenkreuz	5	Yusuke Fujioka	Kojiro Hashiguchi	Sunday Racing	1:56.9
2008	Tascata Sorte	4	Eiji Nakadate	Hideaki Fujiwara	Shadai Race Horse	1:58.4
2009	Sakura Orion	7	Shinichiro Akiyama	Yasuo Ikee	Sakura Commerce	2:00.4
2010	Shadow Gate	8	Katsuharu Tanaka	Yukihiro Kato	Tomokazu Iizuka	2:02.0
2011	Narita Crystal	5	Yutaka Take	Kazuyoshi Kihara	Osumi	2:00.0
2012	Fragarach	5	Ryo Takakura	Mikio Matsunaga	Carrot Farm	1:35.1
2013	Fragarach	6	Ryo Takakura	Mikio Matsunaga	Carrot Farm	1:33.5
2014	Sadamu Patek	6	Katsuharu Tanaka	Masato Nishizono	Sadamu Onishi	1:37.1
2015	Smart Orion	5	Mirco Demuro	Yūichi Shikato	Toru Okawa	1:33.4
2016	Garibaldi	5	Yuichi Fukunaga	Hideaki Fujiwara	Shadai Race Horse	1:33.6
2017	Win Gagnant	5	Akihide Tsumura	Masato Nishizono	WIN	1:33.2
2018	Greater London	6	Hironobu Tanabe	Masahiro Otake	Yoshiro Kubota	1:32.3
2019	Groove It	3	Kohei Matsuyama	Mikio Matsunaga	Carrot Farm	1:33.6
2020	Meikei Die Hard	5	Manabu Sakai	Kazuya Nakatake	Nagoya Horse Racing	1:32.7
2021	Andraste	5	Yuga Kawada	Mitsumasa Nakauchida	Shadai Race Horse	1:46.2
2022	Belenus	5	Atsuya Nishimura	Haruki Sugiyama	Carrot Farm	1:45.9
2023	Selberg	4	Kohei Matsuyama	Takashi Suzuki	Natsumi Kuwabata	1:33.0
2024	Al Naseem	5	Norihiro Yokoyama	Shinsuke Hashiguchi	Lion Race Horse	1:47.2
2025	Ma Puce	3	Takeshi Yokoyama	Yusuke Wada	Yuji Yoshimoto	1:32.3
2026	Lavanda	5	Mirai Iwata	Naoya Nakamura	Satoshi Morinaga	1:31.1

== Earlier winners ==
- 1953 - Leda
- 1954 - Meiji Homare
- 1955 - Rairyu
- 1956 - Hiyaki Organ
- 1957 - Cattle
- 1958 - Blessing
- 1959 - Katsura Shuho
- 1960 - Homare Hero
- 1961 - Caesar
- 1962 - Kusanagi
- 1963 - Haru Hikari
- 1964 - Tetsuno O
- 1965 - Passport
- 1966 - Aoba
- 1967 - Epsom
- 1968 - Satohikaru
- 1969 - Tanino Harromore
- 1970 - Z Arrow
- 1971 - Daihogetsu
- 1972 - Erimo Cup
- 1973 - Naoki
- 1974 - Yamabuki O
- 1975 - Naoki
- 1976 - Road Cup
- 1977 - Horsemen Hope
- 1978 - King Lanark
- 1979 - Mejiro Hawk
- 1980 - Ascot Royal
- 1981 - Kei Kiroku
- 1982 - Kunino Kachidoki
- 1983 - Arrow Bohemian
- 1984 – Hashi Rody
- 1985 – Power Cedar
- 1986 – Shining Ruby
- 1987 – Tosho Leo
- 1988 – Topcoat
- 1989 – Inter Animato
- 1990 – Osaichi George
- 1991 – Lets Go Tarquin
- 1992 – Movie Star
- 1993 – Arashi
- 1994 – Shimano Yamahime
- 1995 – Chokai Carol
- 1996 – Inazuma Takao
- 1997 – Aloha Dream
- 1998 – Toyo Rainbow
- 1999 – Erimo Excel

== See also ==
- Horse racing in Japan
- List of Japanese flat horse races
