= Yoshio Matsumoto =

Japanese racehorse owner and businessman (1938–2025)

- 松本好雄
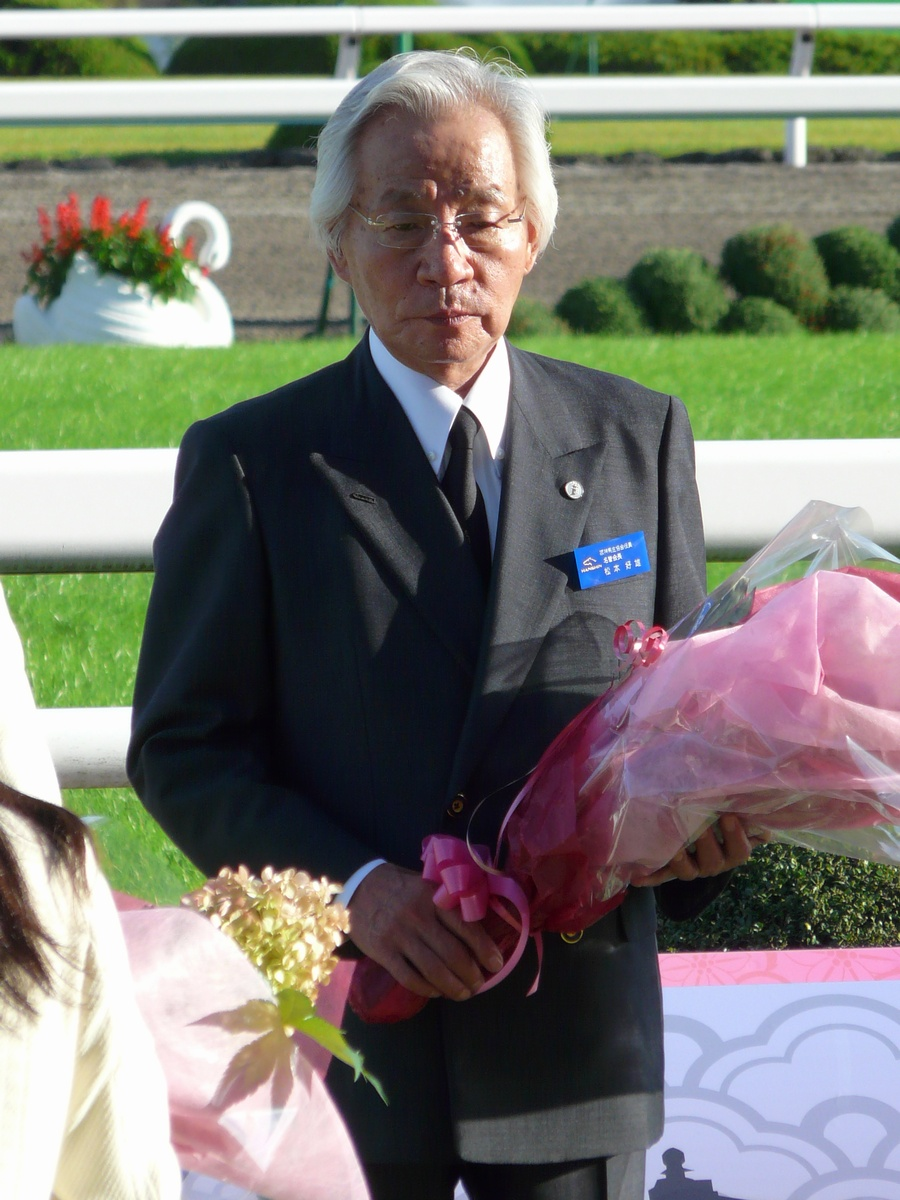
- Born: January 6, 1938; Akashi, Hyōgo Prefecture, Japan
- Died: August 29, 2025 (aged 87)
- Education: Chiba Institute of Technology
- Occupations: Engineer; entrepreneur; racehorse owner
- Title: CEO of Kishio Co., Ltd.; honorary chair Japan Owner's Association
- Children: Yoshitaka Matsumoto (first son)

Yoshio Matsumoto (January 6, 1938 – August 29, 2025) was a Japanese businessman and racehorse owner.

== Background and career ==
Matsumoto was Chief Executive Officer of Kishiro Co., Ltd. (as of 2013), a company in the industrial machinery field that manufactures about 40% of the crank shafts for diesel engines used in large vessels worldwide. He was also an amateur shogi player, holding the rank of 6-dan. He was long acquainted with Kunio Naitō, a former professional shogi player. At Naito's request, Matsumoto had sponsored Kansai Women's Kishiro Cup - Meisho Competition (Kishiro-hai Sōdatsu Kansai Joryū Meishō-sen) since 2005. In 2007, he received the Medal with Dark Blue Ribbon, and in 2010, the Order of the Rising Sun, Gold Rays with Rosette.

He became the head of the support organization for Yasutoshi Nishimura, a member of the House of Representatives from Akashi, through the introduction of Yoshirō Mori, who was then chair of the Seiwa Seisaku Kenkyūkai.

Matsumoto died of pancreatic cancer on August 29, 2025, at the age of 87.

== As a racehorse owner ==
Matsumoto was registered as a horse owner with the Japan Racing Association (JRA). His racing silks featured a blue body with a pink sash and pink sleeves. Takanori Yoshimoto, a jockey affiliated with Hokkaido Keiba (a regional racing association), uses the same silks with Matsumoto's permission. The crown name Meisho (明松) is derived from his hometown Akashi (明石) and his family name Matsumoto (松本). It also shares the pronunciation of the Japanese word for "great commander" (名将).

In 1974, Matsumoto was registered as a JRA racehorse owner. He eventually became a prominent owner with nearly 50 horses per generation, an exceptional number for an individual. In September 2009, he became chair of the Japan Owners' Association and was later appointed honorary chair. Most of his horses were trained at the Ritto Training Center and distributed among various trainers, although some were entrusted to Futoshi Kojima and Eiji Nakano of the Miho Training Center. His wife, Kazuko, and his son, Yoshitaka—who is also the current CEO of Kishiro Co., Ltd—are racehorse owners as well, Yoshitaka is best known as the owner of Meisho Suzanna, winner of the 2015 Queen's Stakes. Both Kazuko and Yoshitaka use the same Meisho crown name as Yoshio.

While the Japanese racing scene is dominated by horses with famous bloodlines from prestigious farms, Matsumoto preferred purchasing inexpensive horses with less well-known pedigrees from small to mid-sized farms, emphasizing the importance of building connections and trust with those farms. He selected horses based on recommendations from trainers and breeders, rather than inspecting them personally. As a result, he first encountered Meisho Samson—a winner of the Tōkyō Yūshun and Tenno Sho—at the paddock of Kokura Racecourse when the horse made its debut. He also owned many descendants of his former racehorses. Meisho Homura and its offspring Meisho Battler both won graded races, making them a successful father-daughter pair. Staff members of small to mid-sized farms affectionately called him Meisho-san as a sign of respect. There was even a social club in the Hidaka region, the San'ai-kai, created to foster friendship with Matsumoto. He also converted many of his unsuccessful racehorses into lead ponies.

While many of his horses won graded races hosted by the JRA, Matsumoto had no success in G1 titles until Meisho Doto won the Takarazuka Kinen in 2001, 28 years after he began owning racehorses. He subsequently gained greater prominence in G1 races with horses such as Meisho Bowler, winner of the February Stakes, and Meisho Samson, winner of the Satsuki Shō, the Japanese Derby, and both the Spring and Autumn Tenno Sho, among others.

While many leading horse owners make a range of requests to trainers—such as which races to enter or which jockeys to use—Matsumoto generally left such decisions to trainers, saying he knew nothing about horses and therefore had nothing to add. However, when Meisho Samson was entered in the Prix de l'Arc de Triomphe in 2007, he replaced the jockey Mamoru Ishibashi with Yutaka Take. In making the change, he summoned both jockeys and personally persuaded Ishibashi, pleading with him to accept the decision—a rare instance of him acting selfishly, according to Nikkan Sports and other news outlets. From the 2010s onward, Matsumoto primarily employed Koshiro Take and Yutaka Take as jockeys for his horses.

On August 23, 2025, Meisho Hakkei, ridden by Riki Takasugi, won a two-year-old debut race, marking Matsumoto's 2,000th victory in the JRA—a feat never before achieved by an individual racehorse owner. This milestone came in the 27,629th JRA race, counting from Cherry Path's debut, when it finished eighth in the sixth race at Kyoto Racecourse on February 9, 1975. At the time of this achievement, Matsumoto was watching the race from home rather than at the racecourse, and he expressed his gratitude through the JRA. Four days later, he died.

His motto was: "There are people, then there are horses, and then there are people again."

== Notable horses ==
=== G1 winners ===
- Meisho Doto – Chukyo Kinen, Kinko Sho, and All Commers in 2000; Nikkei Sho and Takarazuka Kinen in 2001
- Meisho Bowler – Kokura Nisai Stakes and Daily Hai Nisai Stakes in 2003; Negishi Stakes, February Stakes, and Garnet Stakes in 2005
- Meisho Samson – Spring Stakes, Satsuki Sho, and Tōkyō Yūshun in 2006; Sankei Ōsaka Hai, Tenno Sho (Spring), and Tenno Sho (Autumn) in 2007
- Meisho Mambo – Fillies' Revue, Yushun Himba, Shuka Sho, and Queen Elizabeth II Cup in 2013
- Meisho Dassai – Kokura Summer Jump in 2019; Tokyo High Jump and Nakayama Daishogai in 2020; Hanshin Spring Jump and Nakayama Grand Jump in 2021
- Meisho Hario – Miyako Stakes in 2021; March Stakes in 2022; Teio Sho in 2022 and 2023; Kashiwa Kinen in 2023; Kawasaki Kinen in 2025
- Meisho Tabaru – Mainichi Hai and Kobe Shimbun Hai in 2024; Takarazuka Kinen in 2025, 2026

=== Other Graded Race Winners ===
- Meisho King – Kabutoyama Kinen in 1983
- Meisho Eikan – Kyōto Daishōten in 1988
- Meisho Vitoria – Stayers Stakes in 1991
- Meisho Homura – February Stakes in 1993
- Meisho Marine – Kokura Daishoten in 1994
- Meisho Regnum – Kokura Daishoten in 1995
- Meisho Amur – Breeders' Gold Cup in 1996; Nagoya Daishoten in 1997; Breeders' Gold Cup in 1998
- Meisho Tesoro – Shinzan Kinen and Mile Championship (2nd place) in 1995
- Meisho Wakashio – Kyoto Jump Stakes in 2000; Nakayama Daishogai (2nd place) in 2002
- Meisho Motonari – Hokkaido Spring Cup and Super Dirt Derby in 1997; Nagoya Daishoten and February Stakes (2nd place) in 1998; Kakitsubata Kinen in 1999
- Meisho Hidaka – Hokuto Hai in 1998
- Meisho Odo – Sankei Osaka Hai and Mile Championship (3rd place) in 2000; Naruo Kinen and Yasuda Kinen (3rd place) in 2001
- Meisho Domenica – Fukushima Kinen in 2003
- Meisho Kio – Chukyo Kinen in 2004
- Meisho Ramses – Fuji Stakes in 2002
- Meisho Kaido – Kokura Kinen in 2004; Kokura Kinen, Kokura Daishoten, and Kitakyushu Kinen in 2005 (Kokura triple crown in the same year); Tanabata Sho in 2006
- Meisho Battler – Kokura Daishoten in 2004; Procyon Stakes, Summer Champion, Sirius Stakes, and JBC Mile (2nd place) in 2006; Kakitsubata Kinen, Sakitama Hai, Sparking Lady Cup, and Cluster Cup in 2007; Marine Cup and Mile Championship Nambu Hai (2nd place) in 2008; Marine Cup in 2009
- Meicho Munenori – Hyogo Championship in 2004
- Meisho Oscar – Flora Stakes in 2004; Fukushima Himba Stakes in 2005
- Meisho Tokon – Heian Stakes, Tokai Stakes, Elm Stakes, and Tokyo Daishōten (3rd place) in 2007; Nagoya Daishoten, Breeders' Gold Cup, and Champions Cup (horse race) (2nd place) in 2008
- Meisho Qualia – Kyoto Shimbun Hai in 2008
- Meisho Beluga – Nikkei Shinshun Hai, Kyoto Daishoten, and Queen Elizabeth II Cup (2nd place) in 2010
- Meisho Kampaku – Kyoto Daishoten in 2012
- Meisho Mashu – Negishi Stakes in 2013
- Meisho Yodo – Tokyo Jump Stakes in 2014
- Meisho Naruto – Kokura Kinen in 2013; Tanabata Sho in 2014
- Meisho Bushido – Nakayama Daishogai (3rd place) in 2013; Kokura Summer Jump, Hanshin Jump Stakes, and Nakayama Grand Jump (3rd place) in 2014
- Meisho Columbo – Hyogo Gold Trophy in 2014; Nagoya Daishoten in 2015
- Meisho Iron – Kizuna Cup in 2018; Grand Chariot Mombetsu Spring in 2019; Hokkaido Spring Cup and Upopoi Autumn Sprint in 2020
- Meisho Sumitomo – Sirius Stakes and Nagoya Grand Prix in 2017
- Meisho Tekkon – Radio Nikkei Sho in 2018; Nikkei Sho in 2019
- Meisho Tengen – Yayoi Sho in 2019
- Meisho Kazusa – Procyon Stakes, Hakusan Daishoten, and Urawa Kinen in 2021
- Meisho Mimosa – Hanshin Himba Stakes in 2022
- Meisho Murakumo – Leopard Stakes in 2021
- Meisho Funjin – Saga Kinen in 2025

List of horses by earnings

Name	Gender	YOB	Races	Wins	Earnings (JPY)
Meisho Samson	Stallion	2003	27	9	1,065,949,000
Meisho Doto	Stallion	1996	27	10	921,334,000
Meisho Battler	Mare	2000	50	14	584,803,000
Meisho Bowler	Stallion	2001	29	7	466,724,000
Meisho Tokon	Stallion	2002	41	9	429,530,000
Meisho Mambo	Mare	2010	10	6	398,067,000
Meisho Amur	Stallion	1991	53	11	393,299,000
Meisho Kaido	Stallion	1999	43	11	356,984,000
Meisho Odo	Stallion	1995	27	6	332,977,000
Meisho Motonari	Stallion	1994	32	7	295,797,000
Meisho Regnum	Stallion	1988	59	7	275,089,000
Meisho Beluga	Mare	2005	30	7	267,498,000
Meisho Vitoria	Gelding	1987	39	6	253,121,000
Meisho Wakashio	Stallion	1994	59	7	237,337,000
Meisho Homura	Stallion	1988	25	10	234,415,000
Meisho Kio	Stallion	1997	38	7	219,225,000
Meisho Yushi (Note: Its most notable victory was in the TV Aichi Open. After being transferred to a regional racing association, ownership changed from Matsumoto to Masayoshi Okamura.)	Stallion	1991	69	9	212,059,000
Meisho Sumitomo	Stallion	2011	70	8	212,750,000

== Major award winners ==
JRA Award

- Best Three-Year-Old Colt

Meisho Samson (2006)

- Best Three-Year-Old Filly

Meisho Mambo (2013)

- Best Steeplechase Horse

Meisho Dassai (2020)

- JRA Special Award

Meisho Samson (2007)
