= Heian Stakes =

Heian Stakes 平安ステークス
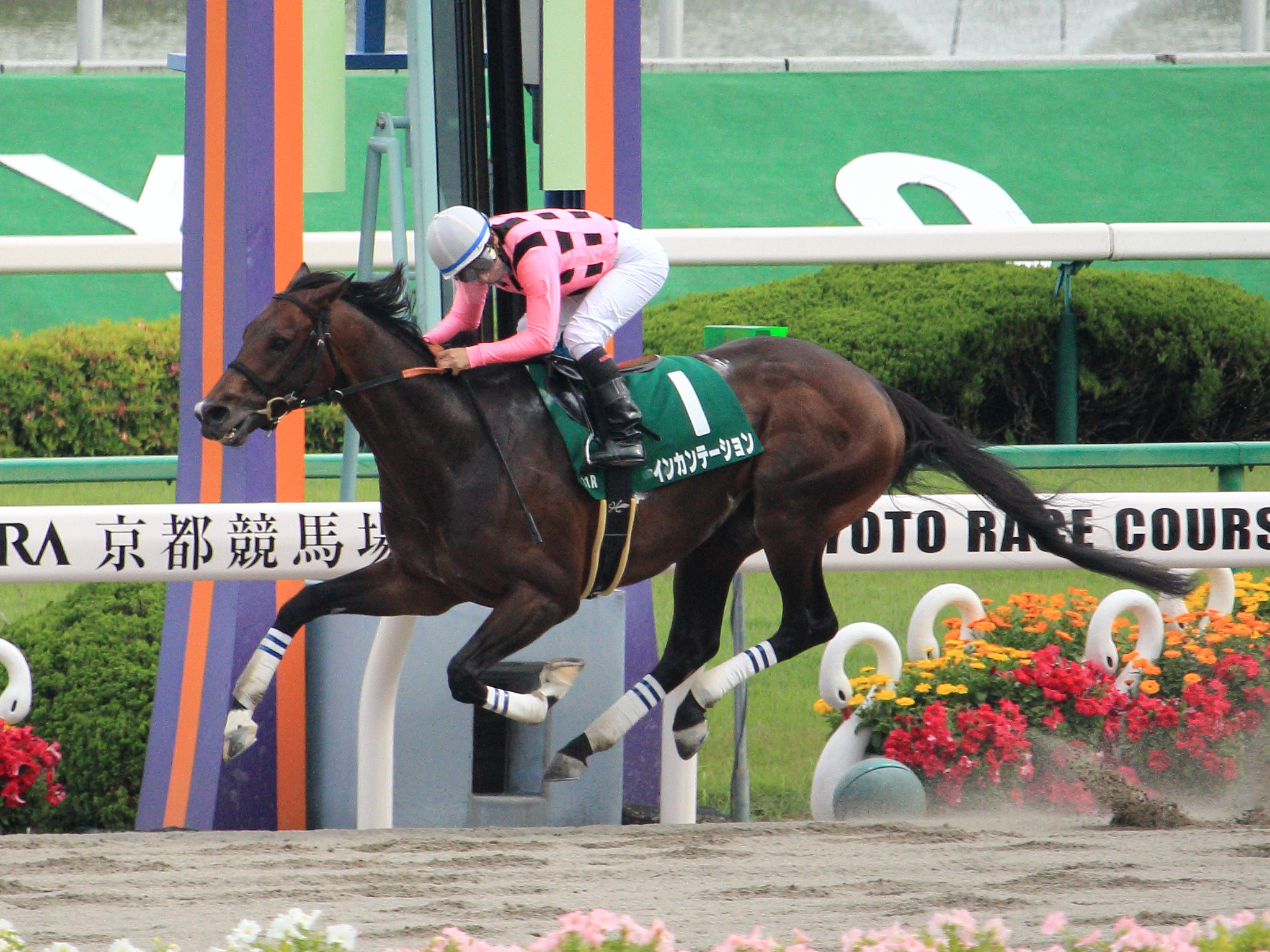
- Incantation win the 2015 Heian Stakes
- Class: Grade 3
- Location: Kyoto Racecourse
- Inaugurated: 1986
- Race type: Thoroughbred Flat racing

Race information
- Distance: 1900 metres
- Surface: Dirt
- Track: Right-handed
- Qualification: 4-y-o+
- Weight: Special Weight
- Purse: ¥ 86,400,000 (as of 2026): 1st: ¥ 40,000,000; 2nd: ¥ 16,000,000; 3rd: ¥ 10,000,000

The Heian Stakes (Japanese 平安ステークス) is a Japanese Grade 3 horse race for Thoroughbreds aged four and over, run in May over a distance of 1900 metres on dirt at Kyoto Racecourse.

The Heian Stakes was first run in 1986 and has held Grade 3 status since 1994. The distance was originally 1400 metres before being increased to 1800 metres in 1994 and to 1900 metres in 2013. The race was run at Hanshin Racecourse in 1994.

== Weight ==
57 kg for four-year-olds and above.

Allowances:

- 2 kg for fillies / mares
- 1 kg for southern hemisphere bred three-year-olds

Penalties (excluding two-year-old race performance):

- If a graded stakes race has been won within a year:
  - 2 kg for a grade 1 win (1 kg for fillies / mares)
  - 1 kg for a grade 2 win
- If a graded stakes race has been won for more than a year:
  - 1 kg for a grade 1 win

== Winners since 1994 ==
Year	Winner	Age	Jockey	Trainer	Owner	Time
1994	Toyo Lyphard	4	Masahiro Matsunaga	Yoshiharu Matsunaga	Toyo Club	1:52.8
1995	Lively Mount	4	Mamoru Ishibashi	Fujio Shibata	Tetsuro Kato	1:52.9
1996	Admire Bosatsu	6	Junichi Serizawa	Mitsuru Hashida	Riichi Kondo	1:50.5
1997 (dh)	Shinko Windy	4	Hirofumi Shii	Kiyotaka Tanaka	Osamu Yasuda	1:49.9
1997 (dh)	Toyo Seattle	4	Masahiro Matsunaga	Yoshiharu Matsunaga	Toyo Club	1:49.9
1998	M I Blanc	6	Yutaka Take	Shuji Ito	Yutaka Inami	1:48.5
1999	Osumi Jet	5	Hirofumi Shii	Toshiaki Shirai	Hidenori Yamaji	1:49.9
2000	Osumi Jet	6	Hirofumi Shii	Toshiaki Shirai	Hidenori Yamaji	1:49.8
2001	Mambo Twist	6	Hirofumi Shii	Taira Furakawa	Genichiro Tahaara	1:48.7
2002	Smart Boy	7	Naoto Ito	Keizo Ito	Grand Stud	1:50.9
2003	Smart Boy	8	Naoto Ito	Keizo Ito	Grand Stud	1:49.7
2004	Time Paradox	6	Mitsuaki Ando	Hiroyoshi Matsuda	Shadai Race Horse	1:51.3
2005	Hishi Atlas	5	Yuichi Fukunaga	Takao Nakano	Masaichiro Abe	1:50.3
2006	Tagano Guernica	4	Kenichi Ikezoe	Kaneo Ikezoe	Ryoji Yagi	1:50.2
2007	Meisho Tokon	5	Mamoru Ishibashi	Isao Yasuda	Yoshio Matsumoto	1:51.0
2008	Quiet Day	8	Koichi Tsunoda	Shoichi Matsumoto	Sunday Racing	1:51.0
2009	Wonder Speed	7	Futoshi Komaki	Tomohiko Hastuki	Nobuyuki Yamamoto	1:50.4
2010	Roll of the Dice	5	Yasunari Iwata	Katsuhiko Sumii	Tokyo Horse Racing	1:51.1
2011	Daishin Orange	6	Yuga Kawada	Yasushi Shono	Nobuyuki Oyagi	1:51.5
2012	Hiraboku King	5	Yusuke Fujioka	Ryuji Okubo	Hirata Bokujo	1:48.1
2013	Nihonpiro Ours	6	Manabu Sakai	Yuki Ohashi	Hyakutaro Kobayashi	1:56.9
2014	Kurino Star O	4	Hideaki Miyuki	Yoshitada Takahashi	Mamoru Kurimoto	1:56.6
2015	Incantation	5	Hiroyuki Uchida	Tomohiko Hastuki	Turf Sports	1:55.1
2016	Asukano Roman	5	Keisuke Dazai	Yoshihiko Kawamura	Chiro Toyoda	1:56.2
2017	Great Pearl	4	Yuga Kawada	Mitsumasa Nakauchida	H.H. Sheikh Fahad	1:55.7
2018	Sunrise Soar	4	Mirco Demuro	Hiroshi Kawachi	Takao Matsuoka	1:57.3
2019	Chuwa Wizard	4	Yuga Kawada	Ryuji Okubo	Shinobu Nakanishi	1:58.1
2020	Omega Perfume	5	Yuichi Kitamura	Shogo Yasuda	Reiko Hara	1:56.0
2021	Auvergne^{[a]}	5	Yuichi Fukunaga	Masayuki Nishimura	Tadakuni Sugiyama	1:54.7
2022	T O Keynes^{[a]}	5	Kohei Matsuyama	Daisuke Takayanagi	Tomoya Ozasa	1:57.0
2023	Gloria Mundi	5	Yuga Kawada	Ryuji Okubo	Kazumi Yoshida	1:59.8
2024	Mitono O	4	Kohei Matsuyama	Koji Maki	Royal Park	1:57.4
2025	Outrange	5	Kohei Matsuyama	Ryuji Okubo	Toshio Terada	1:57.2
2026	Lord Couronne	5	Kazuo Yokoyama	Hirofumi Shii	Lord Horse Club Co.,Ltd.	1:56.9

^{a} Runnings took place at Chukyo while Kyoto was closed for redevelopment.

== Previous Winners ==
- 1986 - Marubutsu Sir Pen
- 1987 - Fate Northern
- 1988 - Dokanjo
- 1989 - Dokanjo
- 1990 - Dancing Sam
- 1991 - Passing Lute
- 1992 - Kyoei Swat
- 1993 - Mr Tojin

== See also ==
- Horse racing in Japan
- List of Japanese flat horse races
