= Champions Cup (horse race) =

Champions Cup チャンピオンズカップ
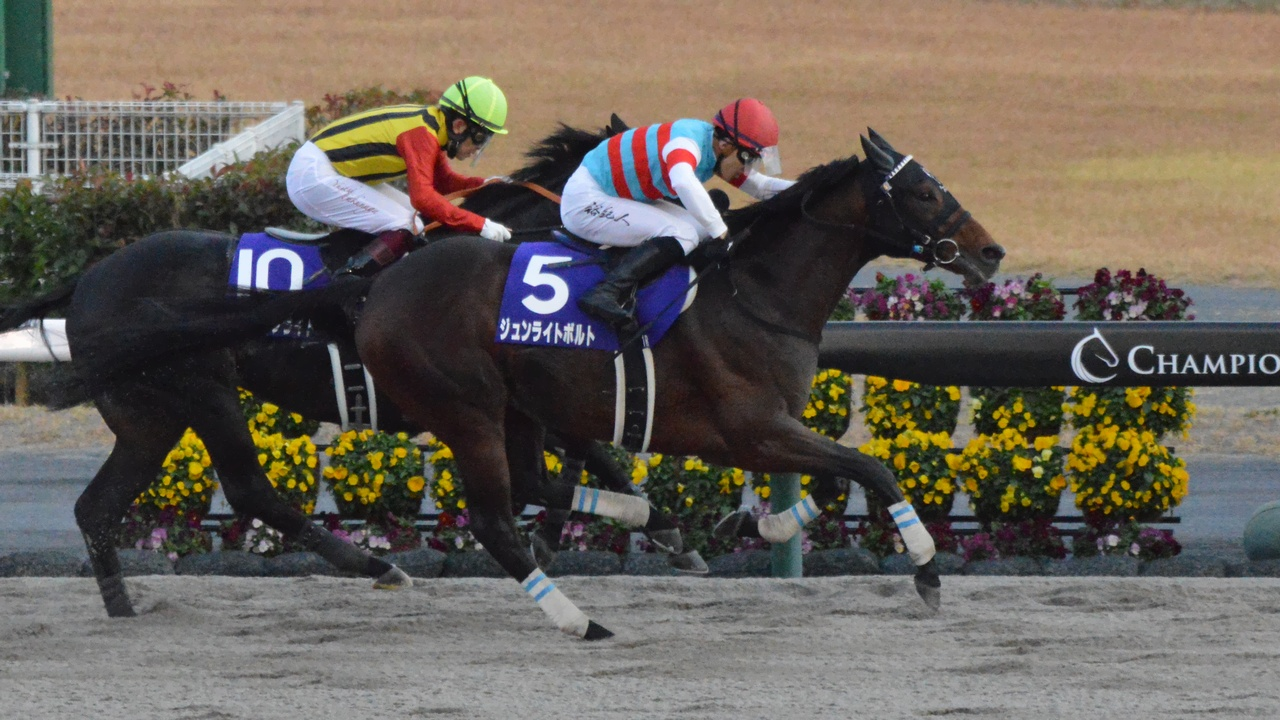
- 2022 Champions Cup winner Jun Light Bolt
- Class: GI
- Location: Chukyo Racecourse, Toyoake, Aichi
- Inaugurated: November 25, 2000 (as the Japan Cup Dirt)
- Race type: Thoroughbred
- Website: japanracing.jp

Race information
- Distance: 1,800 meters (About 9 furlongs)
- Surface: Dirt
- Track: Left-handed
- Qualification: 3-y-o & Up
- Weight: 3-y-o colts & geldings 56 kg 4-y-o & up horses & geldings 58 kg Allowance : 2 kg fillies & mares
- Purse: ¥ 259,200,000 (as of 2025): 1st: ¥ 120,000,000; 2nd: ¥ 48,000,000; 3rd: ¥ 30,000,000
- Bonuses: Winning horse owner will receive a ¥3,000,000 bonus.

The Champions Cup (formerly the Japan Cup Dirt until 2013) is a Grade 1 flat horse race for thoroughbreds aged three and above contested in Japan in early December. Organized by Japan Racing Association, it is run at a distance of 1,800 meters at Chukyo Racecourse. In recent years, the race has followed the Japan Cup on the Japanese racing calendar.

== 2008 changes ==
The race was moved from Tokyo Racecourse to Hanshin Racecourse in 2008. The Japan Cup Dirt had been overshadowed by its turf counterpart (the Japan Cup) in recent years, because turf racing in Japan typically remains more popular and attracts better horses. Attendance for the 2007 Japan Cup Dirt was 56,052, while the attendance for the turf race the following day was 103,545.

With the move to Hanshin, the Japan Cup Dirt was shortened from its original distance of 2,100 meters (about 10 1/2 furlongs) to 1,800 meters (about 9 furlongs). Now run one week after the Japan Cup, the Japan Cup Dirt shares the weekend with the "World Super Jockeys Series" featuring jockeys from around the world.

== 2014 changes ==
The Japan Cup Dirt was moved to Chukyo Racecourse in 2014 and renamed the Champions Cup. According to the Japan Racing Association, the decision to make changes to the race was because of a lack of international participation. The new Champions Cup race will be run left-handed, as opposed to the right turns run since the race moved from Tokyo to Hanshin in 2008. The purse of the race will be reduced to ¥94 million - compared to ¥130 million for the 2013 running - and it will no longer be an invitational race. The 2014 running is scheduled for Sunday, December 7.

== Purse ==
(For the 2007 running)

Total JPN ¥277,900,000 (U.S$. 2,416,000)

- 1st JPN ¥130,000,000 (U.S$. 1,103,000)
- 2nd JPN ¥52,000,000 (U.S$. 452,000)
- 3rd JPN ¥33,000,000 (U.S$. 286,000)
- 4th JPN ¥20,000,000 (U.S$. 173,000)
- 5th JPN ¥13,000,000 (U.S$. 113,000)

Like counterpart Japan Cup, as being one of the 4 GI races in Japan Autumn International Series since 2008, a bonus is added to the top 3 if they are not trained in Japan, and raced in one of the following races and finished likewise in same year. If multiple bonus applies, only the highest one counts.

Preparatory Event to Japan Cup Dirt	Qualification	Japan Cup Bonus(JPN ¥)
Dubai World Cup Breeders' Cup Classic Kentucky Derby	Current Year Winner	Winner:100,000,000; 1st runner-up:40,000,000 2nd runner-up:25,000,000
Dubai World Cup Breeders' Cup Classic Kentucky Derby	Current Year Runner-Up	Winner:40,000,000; 1st runner-up:16,000,000 2nd runner-up:10,000,000
Santa Anita Handicap Metropolitan Handicap Stephen Foster Handicap Hollywood Gold Cup Whitney Handicap Pacific Classic Stakes Jockey Club Gold Cup Woodward Stakes Preakness Stakes Belmont Stakes Travers Stakes	Current Year Winner	Winner:70,000,000; 1st runner-up:28,000,000 2nd runner-up:18,000,000

== Trial races ==
Trial races provide automatic berths to the winning horses.

Race	Grade	Racecourse	Distance	Condition
Miyako Stakes	GIII	Kyoto	Dirt 1,800 metres	Winner
Musashino Stakes	GIII	Tokyo	Dirt 1,600 metres	Winner

== Records ==
Speed record:

- 1:48.5 – Chrysoberyl (2019)

Most wins by a horse (2):

- Kane Hekili (2005, 2008)
- Lemon Pop (2023, 2024)
- Transcend (2010, 2011)

Most wins by a jockey (4):

- Yutaka Take (2001, 2004, 2005, 2007)

Most wins by a trainer (3):

- Katsuhiko Sumii (2005, 2008, 2015)

Most wins by an owner (3):

- Makoto Kaneko (2001, 2005, 2008)

== Winners ==
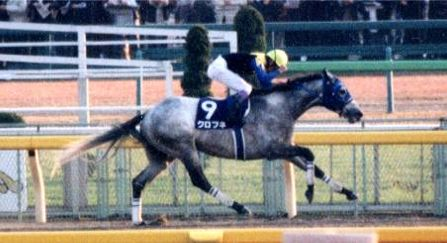
Kurofune wins the 2001 Japan Cup Dirt

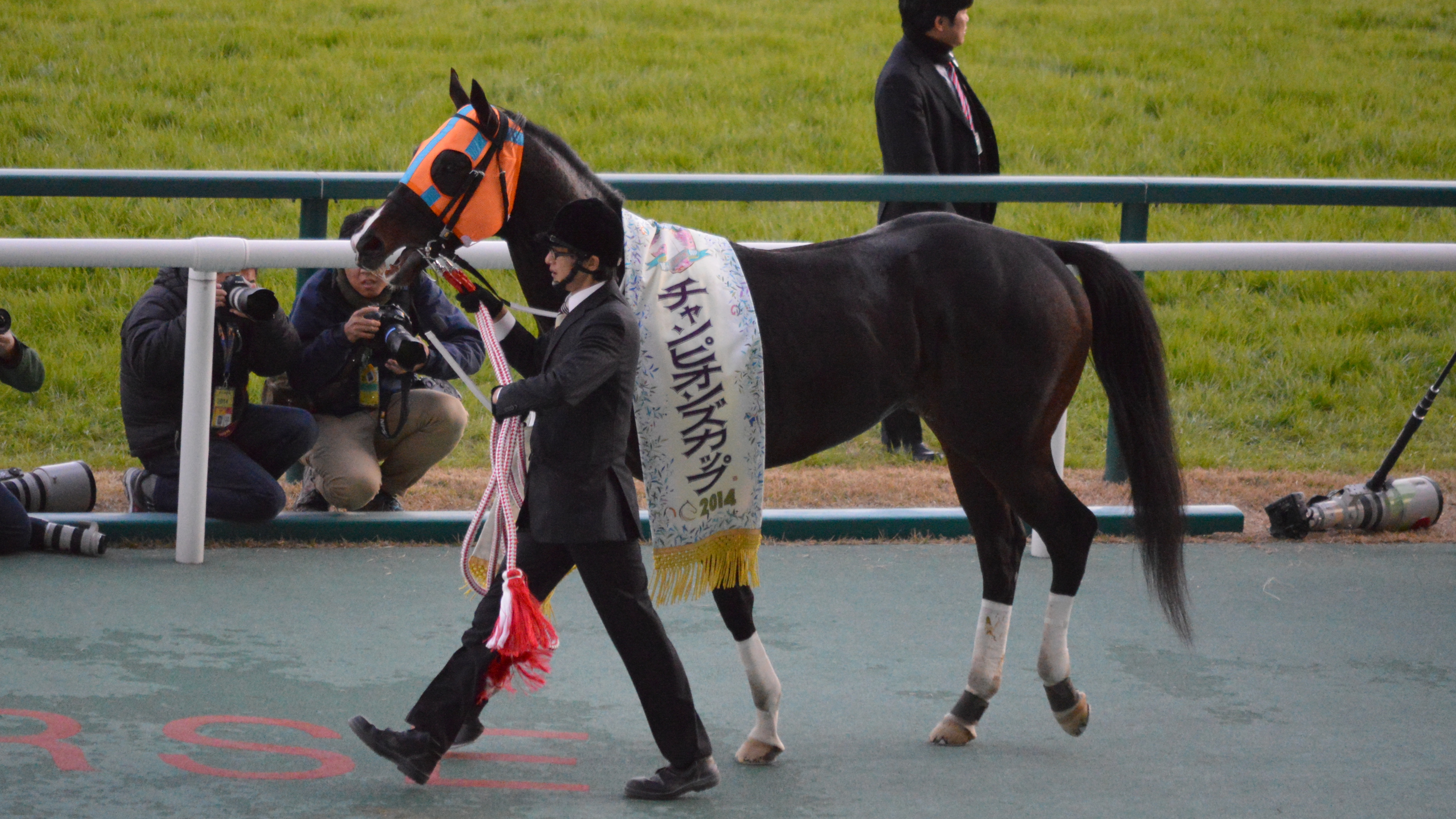
Hokko Tarumae, the winner of the 2014 edition

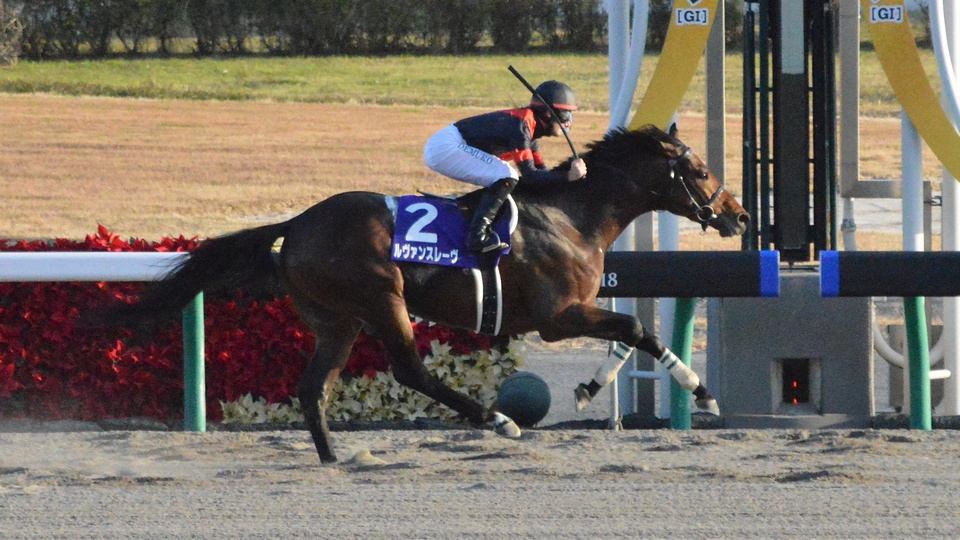
Le Vent Se Leve wins the 2018 edition as a 3-year-old

Year	Winner	Age	Jockey	Trainer	Owner	Time
2000	Wing Arrow	5	Yukio Okabe	Katsumi Minai	Minoru Ikeda	2:07.2
2001	Kurofune	3	Yutaka Take	Kunihide Matsuda	Makoto Kaneko	2:05.9
2002	Eagle Café	5	Frankie Dettori	Futoshi Kojima	Kiyoshi Nishikawa	1:52.2
2003	Fleetstreet Dancer	5	Jon Court	Doug O'Neill	Lee & Ty Leatherman	2:09.2
2004	Time Paradox	6	Yutaka Take	Hiroyoshi Matsuda	Shadai Racehorse Co.	2:08.7
2005	Kane Hekili	3	Yutaka Take	Katsuhiko Sumii	Makoto Kaneko	2:08.0
2006	Alondite	3	Hiroki Goto	Sei Ishizaka	Carrot Farm Co.	2:08.5
2007	Vermilion	5	Yutaka Take	Sei Ishizaka	Sunday Racing Co. Ltd.	2:06.7
2008	Kane Hekili	6	Christophe Lemaire	Katsuhiko Sumii	Makoto Kaneko	1:49.2
2009	Espoir City	4	Tetsuzo Sato	Akio Adachi	Yushun Horse	1:49.9
2010	Transcend	4	Shinji Fujita	Yasuda Takayuki	Koji Maeda	1:48.9
2011	Transcend	5	Shinji Fujita	Yasuda Takayuki	Koji Maeda	1:50.6
2012	Nihonpiro Ours	5	Manabu Sakai	Yuki Ohashi	Hyakutaro Kobayashi	1:48.8
2013	Belshazzar	5	Christophe Lemaire	Kunihide Matsuda	Shadai Race Horse Co.	1:50.4
2014	Hokko Tarumae	5	Hideaki Miyuki	Katsuichi Nishiura	Michiaki Yabe	1:51.0
2015	Sambista	5	Mirco Demuro	Katsuhiko Sumii	K Hidaka Breeders Union	1:50.4
2016	Sound True	6	Takuya Ono	Noboru Takagi	Hiroshi Yamada	1:50.1
2017	Gold Dream	4	Ryan Moore	Osamu Hirata	Katsumi Yoshida	1:50.1
2018	Le Vent Se Leve	3	Mirco Demuro	Kiyoshi Hagiwara	G1 Racing Co. Ltd.	1:50.1
2019	Chrysoberyl	3	Yuga Kawada	Hidetaka Otonashi	U Carrot Farm	1:48.5
2020	Chuwa Wizard	5	Keita Tosaki	Ryuji Okubo	Shinobu Nakanishi	1:49.3
2021	T O Keynes	4	Kohei Matsuyama	Daisuke Takayanagi	Tomoya Ozasa	1:49.7
2022	Jun Light Bolt	5	Yukito Ishikawa	Yasuo Tomomichi	Junji Kawai	1:51.9
2023	Lemon Pop	5	Ryusei Sakai	Hiroyasu Tanaka	Godolphin	1:50.6
2024	Lemon Pop	6	Ryusei Sakai	Hiroyasu Tanaka	Godolphin	1:50.1
2025	W Heart Bond	4	Ryusei Sakai	Ryuji Okubo	Silk Racing Co., Ltd.	1:50.2

- 2000, 2001, 2003–2007: Tokyo Racecourse, 2,100 meters, counter-clockwise (left-handed)
- 2002: Nakayama Racecourse, 1,800 meters, clockwise (right-handed)
- 2008–2013: Hanshin Racecourse, 1,800 meters, clockwise
- 2014–present (scheduled): Chukyo Racecourse, 1,800 meters, counter-clockwise

== See also ==
- Horse racing in Japan
- List of Japanese flat horse races
