= Chukyo Racecourse =

Horse racecourse in Toyoake, Japan

Chukyo Racecourse 中京競馬場
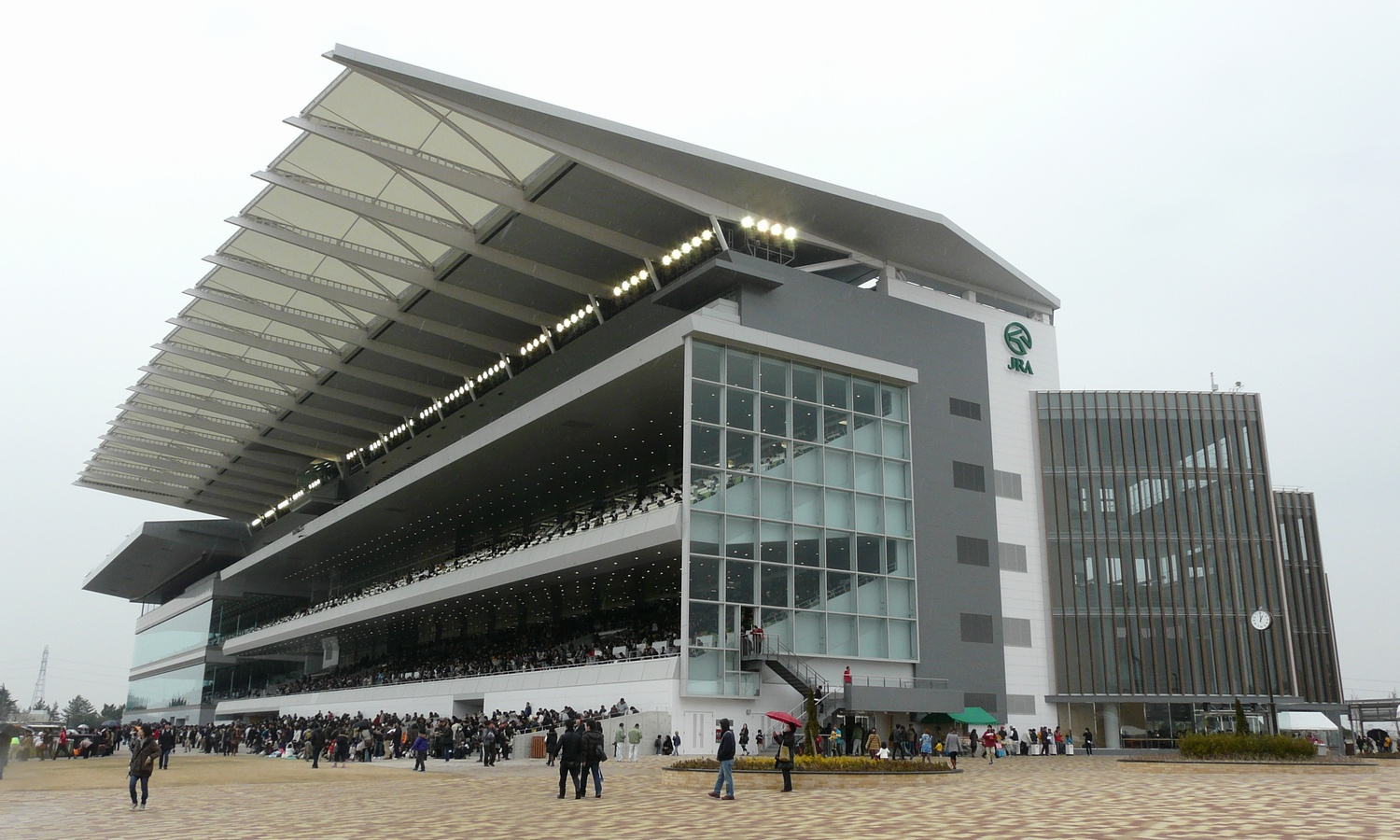
- Interactive map of Chukyo Racecourse 中京競馬場
- Location: 1225 Magome-chō Shikita Toyoake, Aichi, Japan
- Coordinates: 35°4′0.25″N 136°59′22.0″E
- Owned by: Nagoya Horse Racing Co., Ltd.
- Date opened: 1953
- Race type: Flat, Steeplechase
- Notable races: Takamatsunomiya Kinen (G1); Champions Cup (G1); Kinko Sho (G2)

Chukyo Racecourse (中京競馬場, Chūkyō-keibajō) is located in Toyoake, Aichi, Japan. It is used for horse racing. It was built in 1953. It has a capacity of 58,400. It has 8,795 seats. Unlike the JRA's nine other racecourses, it is independent of the JRA, with most of the racecourse owned and run by Nagoya Horse Racing Co., Ltd.

== Physical attributes ==
Chukyo Racecourse has a grass course, a dirt course, and a jump course.

The turf measures 1705.9 meters. Races can be run on the "A Course" rail setting (on the hedge), the "B Course" setting (rail out 3 meters), or the "C Course" setting (rail out 7 meters).

1000m, 1200m, 1400m, 1700m, 1800m, 2000m, 2500m and 2800m races are run on the oval.

The dirt course measures 1530 meters, with races at distances of 1000m, 1200m, 1600m, 1700m, 1800m, and 2300m.

== Notable races ==
| Month | Race | Distance | Age/Sex |
Grade I
| Mar. | Takamatsunomiya Kinen | Turf 1200m | 4yo + |
| Dec. | Champions Cup | Dirt 1800m | 3yo + |
Grade II
| Jan. | Procyon Stakes (February Stakes Trial) | Dirt 1800m | 4yo + |
| Mar. | Kinko Sho (Osaka Hai Trial) | Turf 2000m | 4yo + |
Grade III
| Mar. | Falcon Stakes | Turf 1400m | 3yo |
| Mar. | Aichi Hai | Turf 1400m | 4yo + f |
| Jul. | Tokai Stakes | Dirt 1400m | 3yo + |
| Aug. | CBC Sho (Handicap) | Turf 1200m | 3yo + |
| Aug. | Chukyo Kinen | Turf 1600m | 3yo + |
| Aug. | Chukyo Nisai Stakes | Turf 1400m | 2yo |
| Dec. | Chunichi Shimbun Hai (Handicap) | Turf 2000m | 3yo + |

== Track records ==
Source：レコードタイム表 (Record time table) -> 中京競馬場 (Chukyo Racecourse)

- † Reference Time.
- Last updated on June 20, 2026.

=== Turf course (2yo) ===
| Distance | Time | Racehorse | Sex | Weight | Jockey | Date Recorded |
|---|---|---|---|---|---|---|
| 1200m | 1:07.9 | Big Caesar | Colt | 54 kg | Hideaki Miyuki | September 18, 2022 |
| 1400m | 1:19.4 | Candide | Colt | 55 kg | Yuichi Kitamura | August 31, 2025 |
| 1600m | 1:32.6 | Cool Taro | Colt | 55 kg | Seinosuke Yoshimura | August 22,2026 |
| 2000m | 1:59.8 | Rond | Colt | 54 kg | Yutaka Take | September 25, 2021 |

=== Turf course (3yo+) ===
| Distance | Time | Racehorse | Sex | Weight | Jockey | Date Recorded |
|---|---|---|---|---|---|---|
| 1200m | 1:06.2 | Meikei Yell | Filly 4 | 55 kg | Kenichi Ikezoe | September 11, 2022 |
| 1400m | 1:18.7 | Acutus | Horse 5 | 56 kg | Riki Takasugi | August 2, 2025 |
| 1600m | 1:31.3 | Glory Link | Filly 3 | 53 kg | Yuichi Kitamura | August 31, 2025 |
| 2000m | 1:56.5 | Reframing | Horse 6 | 57 kg | Yuga Kawada | August 11, 2024 |
| 2200m | 2:09.0 | Prima Vista | Horse 5 | 54 kg | Kota Fujioka | May 8, 2022 |
| 3000m | 3:03.4 | Mixology | Colt 4 | 53 kg | Atsuya Nishimura | January 5, 2023 |

=== Dirt course (2yo) ===
| Distance | Time | Racehorse | Sex | Weight | Jockey | Date Recorded |
|---|---|---|---|---|---|---|
| 1200m | 1:10.7 | Otomena Shacho | Filly | 55 kg | Kohei Matsuyama | September 15, 2024 |
| 1400m | 1:23.6 | Dualist | Colt | 54 kg | Yuichi Kitamura | September 26, 2020 |
| 1800m | 1:51.2 | Copano Nicholson | Colt | 53 kg | Heart Kameda | September 26, 2021 |

=== Dirt course (3yo+) ===
| Distance | Time | Racehorse | Sex | Weight | Jockey | Date Recorded |
|---|---|---|---|---|---|---|
| 1200m | 1:09.1 | Rhein Garuda | Mare 5 | 55 kg | Daito Ozawa | September 10, 2022 |
| 1400m | 1:20.3 | Matera Sky | Horse 7 | 56 kg | Yutaka Take | July 8, 2018 |
| 1800m | 1:47.6 | Sumahama | Colt 4 | 54 kg | Yusuke Fujioka | July 14, 2019 |
| 1900m | 1:54.7 | Auvergne | Horse 5 | 58 kg | Yuichi Fukunaga | May 22, 2021 |
| 2500m | 2:44.6† | Azuma Ryusei | Horse 5 | 58 kg | Ryota Sameshima | December 8, 2012 |

== Access ==
The closest train station is Chūkyō-keibajō-mae Station, which is named after this racecourse.
