= Hayayakko =

Japanese Thoroughbred racehorse (foaled 2016)

Hayayakko; ハヤヤッコ
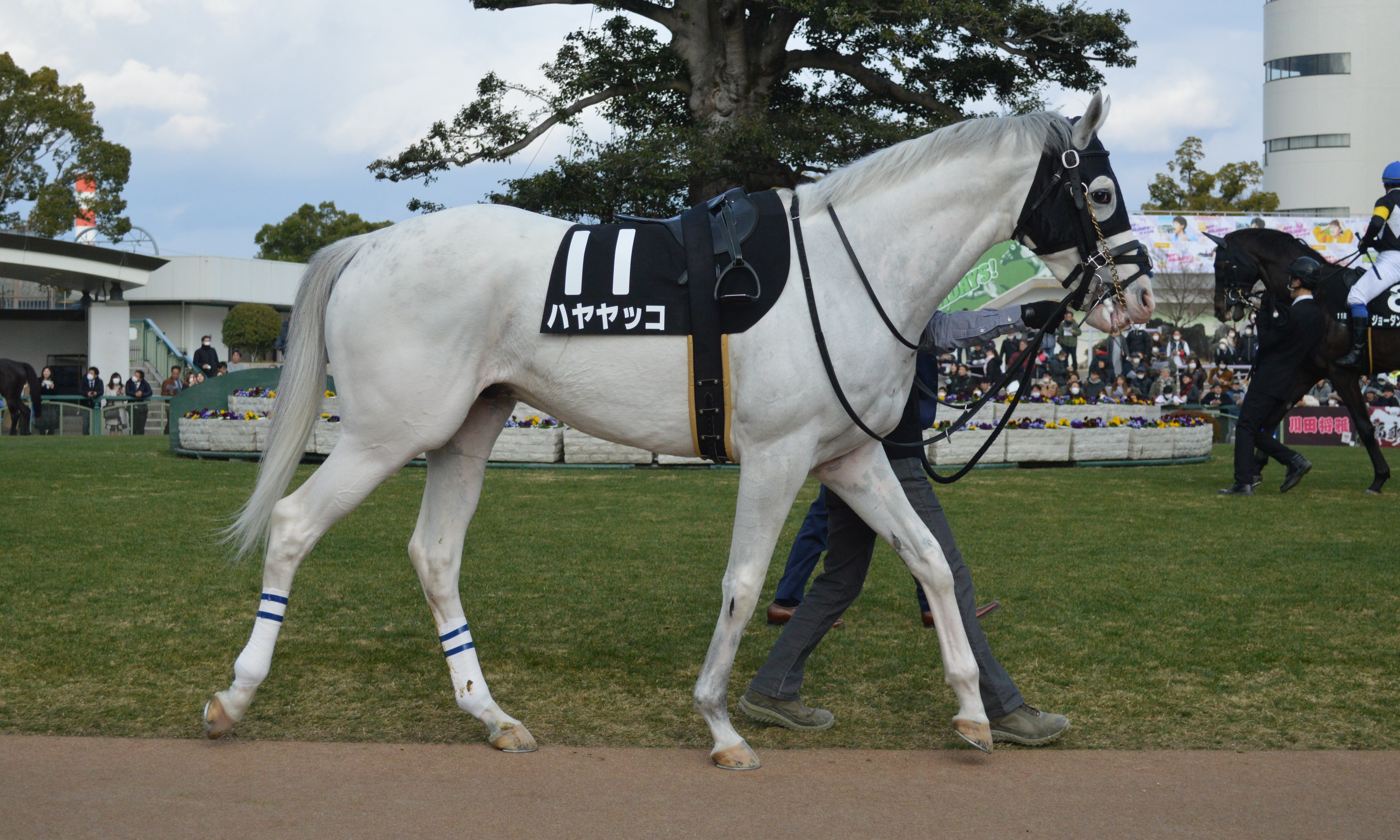
- Hayayakko at the 2020 Aldebaran Stakes
- Breed: Thoroughbred
- Sire: King Kamehameha
- Grandsire: Kingmambo
- Dam: Marshmallow
- Damsire: Kurofune
- Sex: Stallion
- Foaled: 10 February 2016 (age 10)
- Country: Japan
- Colour: White
- Breeder: Northern Farm
- Owner: Kaneko Makoto Holdings
- Racing colours
- Trainer: Sakae Kunieda
- Jockey: Kosei Miura; Christophe Lemaire; Suguru Hamanaka; Oisin Murphy; Yutaka Take; Hironobu Tanabe; Yuga Kawada; Lyle Hewitson; Arata Saito; Hiroyuki Uchida; Kenichi Ikezoe; Takuya Ono; Hayato Yoshida; Hideaki Miyuki; Genki Maruyama; Yuichi Kitamura; Yutaka Yoshida; Michael Dee
- Record: 45: 7-6-5
- Earnings: ¥306,140,000

Major wins
- Copa Republica Argentina (2024); Hakodate Kinen (2022); Leopard Stakes (2019); Brazil Cup (2020)

Hayayakko (Japanese: ハヤヤッコ, Hayayakko; foaled 10 February 2016) is a retired Japanese Thoroughbred racehorse. He recorded seven wins from forty-five starts between 2018 and 2025, including the Copa República Argentina (GII) in 2024, the Hakodate Kinen (GIII) in 2022, and the Leopard Stakes (GIII) in 2019. He was the first white horse to win a JRA graded stakes race, and the first white horse to contest the Arima Kinen. His name translates to "fast and white".

== Background ==
Hayayakko is a white stallion bred in Abira, Hokkaido, by Northern Farm. He was sired by King Kamehameha, a son of Kingmambo, and his dam was Marshmallow, a white mare by Kurofune. He is part of the Shirayukihime white horse family; his relatives include Sodashi, Meikei Yell, Mama Cocha, and Yukichan. He was owned by Kaneko Makoto Holdings and trained by Sakae Kunieda at the JRA's Miho Training Center.

== Racing career ==
=== 2018: two-year-old season ===
Hayayakko debuted on 24 June 2018 in a 2-year-old newcomer race over 1800 metres on turf at Tokyo Racecourse. Ridden by Kosei Miura, he finished third. Although his white family was primarily successful on dirt, his trainer entered him on turf to explore his potential. On 5 August, he won his maiden race on turf at Niigata Racecourse by 0.6 seconds. He subsequently finished eighth in the Ivy Stakes and fourth in the Mochinoki Sho on dirt.

=== 2019: three-year-old season ===
He began the year with two second-place finishes in allowance races before winning his third start on 23 March at Nakayama Racecourse. After finishing eighth in the Seiryu Stakes, he contested the Leopard Stakes (GIII) on dirt at Niigata on 4 August. Starting as the 10th favourite, he overtook Delma Rivale to win by a head. This victory made him the first white horse to win a JRA graded stakes race. The race also served as a memorial for Deep Impact, whose owner, Makoto Kaneko, won the tribute race with his own horse. He did not race again that year due to throat inflammation.

=== 2020: four-year-old season ===
Hayayakko returned on 12 January, finishing second in the Pollux Stakes. After unplaced finishes in the Aldebaran Stakes, Heian Stakes, and Akhalteke Stakes, he placed third in the BSN Sho and fifth in the Radio Nippon Sho. On 25 October, he won the Brazil Cup (Listed) at Tokyo, rallying from last place to win by 0.4 seconds.

=== 2021: five-year-old season ===
He started the season with a sixth-place finish in the Tokai Stakes (GII) and a third in the Sobu Stakes. After unplaced efforts in the March Stakes and Brilliant Stakes, he won the Sleipnir Stakes on 19 June, rallying from last place on a heavy track to win by 0.1 seconds. He finished the year with a tenth in the Sirius Stakes, a fourth in the Brazil Cup, and a ninth in the Betelgeuse Stakes.

=== 2022: six-year-old season ===
After a 14th-place finish in the Tokai Stakes, his connections switched him to turf racing. He finished fifth in the Nikkei Sho (GII) and 15th in the Tennō Shō (Spring) (GI). On 17 July, he contested the Hakodate Kinen (GIII) on heavy turf. Ridden by Suguru Hamanaka, he advanced on the inside, took the lead at the top of the straight, and held on to win by 0.2 seconds, securing his first graded stakes win on turf. He finished the year with a tenth in the Sapporo Kinen and a fifth in the Chunichi Shimbun Hai.

=== 2023: seven-year-old season ===
Hayayakko remained on the turf circuit, recording a sixth in the Nikkei Shinshun Hai, a fourth in the Kinko Sho, a sixth in the Niigata Daishoten, a fifth in the Hakodate Kinen, and a tenth in the Sankei Sho All Comers. On 9 December, he finished second in the Chunichi Shimbun Hai, recording the fastest final three furlongs of the race at 33.9 seconds.

=== 2024: eight-year-old season ===
He began the year with a fourth in the Kinko Sho, followed by unplaced finishes in the Osaka Hai and Hakodate Kinen. After a third-place finish in the Thailand Cup, he contested the Copa Republica Argentina (GII) on 3 November at Tokyo. Carrying the top weight of 58.5 kg, he rallied from last place on the outside to win by 0.1 seconds. The victory made him the first eight-year-old to win the race since 1985, and the first horse to carry 58.5 kg to victory since 1988. On 22 December, he became the first white horse to contest the Arima Kinen (GI), finishing 15th.

=== 2025: nine-year-old season ===
Hayayakko finished tenth in the Nikkei Sho on 29 March. On 1 June, he contested the Meguro Kinen (GII) at Tokyo. Ridden by Michael Dee, he drifted wide on the final turn and lost momentum, ultimately being pulled up. He was subsequently diagnosed with a ruptured superficial digital flexor tendon in his right foreleg. His retirement was announced on 6 June 2025 and was pensioned at Northern Horse Park in Tomakomai, Hokkaido, to live out his retirement.

== Race record ==
The following table details all 45 starts of Hayayakko's racing career based on official JBIS and netkeiba records. Record current as of his final start on 1 June 2025.

| Date | Distance (Condition) | Race | Class | Course | Odds (Favourite) | Field | Finish | Time | Jockey | Winning (Losing) Margin | Winner (2nd Place) | Ref |
|---|---|---|---|---|---|---|---|---|---|---|---|---|
2018 – two-year-old season
| Jun 24 | Turf 1800 m (Heavy) | 2-Y-O Newcomer | Maiden | Tokyo | 6.6 (3rd) | 14 | 3rd | 1:50.8 | Kosei Miura | 0.3 | Unbroken | |
| Aug 5 | Turf 1800 m (Good) | 2-Y-O Maiden | Maiden | Niigata | 1.7 (1st) | 10 | 1st | 1:49.4 | Christophe Lemaire | –0.6 | (Atomic Force) | |
| Oct 20 | Turf 1800 m (Good) | Ivy Stakes | Open | Tokyo | 7.7 (4th) | 10 | 8th | 1:49.5 | Christophe Lemaire | 0.9 | Chrono Genesis | |
| Nov 17 | Dirt 1800 m (Good) | Mochinoki Sho | 1-win | Kyoto | 6.2 (3rd) | 10 | 4th | 1:53.0 | Suguru Hamanaka | 0.8 | Nova Lenda | |
2019 – three-year-old season
| Jan 26 | Dirt 1600 m (Good) | 3-Y-O Allowance | 1-win | Tokyo | 4.6 (2nd) | 14 | 2nd | 1:39.4 | Oisin Murphy | 0.0 | Leapling Star | |
| Mar 3 | Dirt 1800 m (Yielding) | 3-Y-O Allowance | 1-win | Nakayama | 4.7 (3rd) | 10 | 2nd | 1:54.5 | Yutaka Take | 0.2 | Madras Check | |
| Mar 23 | Dirt 1800 m (Good) | 3-Y-O Allowance | 1-win | Nakayama | 3.0 (2nd) | 16 | 1st | 1:54.3 | Yutaka Take | –0.6 | (Gold Meister) | |
| May 12 | Dirt 1600 m (Good) | Seiryu Stakes | Open | Tokyo | 18.9 (6th) | 12 | 8th | 1:37.6 | Yutaka Take | 1.0 | Due Process | |
| Aug 4 | Dirt 1800 m (Good) | Leopard Stakes | GIII | Niigata | 24.0 (10th) | 15 | 1st | 1:51.3 | Hironobu Tanabe | 0.0 | (Derma Louvre) | |
2020 – four-year-old season
| Jan 12 | Dirt 1800 m (Good) | Pollux Stakes | Open | Nakayama | 5.2 (3rd) | 15 | 2nd | 1:53.4 | Oisin Murphy | 0.7 | Suave Aramis | |
| Feb 8 | Dirt 1900 m (Good) | Aldebaran Stakes | Open | Kyoto | 6.9 (3rd) | 16 | 10th | 1:59.4 | Yuga Kawada | 2.1 | Road Regalis | |
| Mar 8 | Dirt 1800 m (Heavy) | Sobu Stakes | Open | Nakayama | 6.4 (3rd) | 16 | 2nd | 1:53.1 | Lyle Hewitson | 0.2 | Meisho Wazashi | |
| May 23 | Dirt 1900 m (Good) | Heian Stakes | GIII | Kyoto | 76.0 (11th) | 14 | 12th | 1:57.8 | Arata Saito | 1.8 | Omega Perfume | |
| Jun 27 | Dirt 1600 m (Yielding) | Akhal-Teke Stakes | Open | Tokyo | 16.2 (8th) | 13 | 10th | 1:37.2 | Hironobu Tanabe | 1.1 | Ashaka Tobu | |
| Aug 29 | Dirt 1800 m (Good) | BSN Sho | Listed | Niigata | 7.7 (3rd) | 10 | 3rd | 1:50.6 | Hironobu Tanabe | 0.1 | Lord Bless | |
| Sep 19 | Dirt 1800 m (Good) | Radio Nippon Sho | Open | Nakayama | 5.0 (2nd) | 16 | 5th | 1:52.5 | Hironobu Tanabe | 0.9 | Rapier Wit | |
| Oct 25 | Dirt 2100 m (Good) | Brazil Cup | Listed | Tokyo | 6.0 (2nd) | 11 | 1st | 2:08.8 | Hironobu Tanabe | –0.4 | (Great Time) | |
2021 – five-year-old season
| Jan 24 | Dirt 1800 m (Heavy) | Tokai Stakes | GII | Chukyo | 8.2 (3rd) | 15 | 6th | 1:49.9 | Hironobu Tanabe | 0.7 | Auvergne | |
| Mar 7 | Dirt 1800 m (Good) | Sobu Stakes | Open | Nakayama | 5.9 (3rd) | 16 | 3rd | 1:53.7 | Hironobu Tanabe | 0.2 | Namura Kametaro | |
| Mar 28 | Dirt 1800 m (Yielding) | March Stakes | GIII | Nakayama | 13.5 (4th) | 16 | 5th | 1:51.8 | Kosei Miura | 0.8 | Rapier Wit | |
| May 9 | Dirt 2100 m (Good) | Brilliant Stakes | Listed | Tokyo | 4.3 (2nd) | 16 | 8th | 2:11.0 | Hironobu Tanabe | 1.4 | Heroic Tale | |
| Jun 19 | Dirt 2100 m (Heavy) | Sleipnir Stakes | Open | Tokyo | 9.7 (5th) | 16 | 1st | 2:08.0 | Hironobu Tanabe | –0.1 | (Bank of Clouds) | |
| Oct 2 | Dirt 1900 m (Good) | Sirius Stakes | GIII | Chukyo | 10.7 (6th) | 16 | 10th | 1:59.1 | Hironobu Tanabe | 1.7 | Sunrise Hope | |
| Oct 24 | Dirt 2100 m (Good) | Brazil Cup | Listed | Tokyo | 6.3 (3rd) | 16 | 4th | 2:09.8 | Hiroyuki Uchida | 0.4 | Great Time | |
| Dec 28 | Dirt 1800 m (Good) | Betelgeuse Stakes | Listed | Hanshin | 16.1 (9th) | 16 | 9th | 1:53.1 | Ryusei Sakai | 1.4 | Iolite | |
2022 – six-year-old season
| Jan 23 | Dirt 1800 m (Good) | Tokai Stakes | GII | Chukyo | 30.6 (9th) | 16 | 14th | 1:53.8 | Kenichi Ikezoe | 2.1 | Suave Aramis | |
| Mar 26 | Turf 2500 m (Yielding) | Nikkei Sho | GII | Nakayama | 103.6 (13th) | 15 | 5th | 2:35.8 | Takuya Ono | 0.4 | Titleholder | |
| May 1 | Turf 3200 m (Yielding) | Tennō Shō (Spring) | GI | Hanshin | 58.1 (11th) | 18 | 15th | 3:21.1 | Yutaka Take | 4.9 | Titleholder | |
| Jul 17 | Turf 2000 m (Heavy) | Hakodate Kinen | GIII | Hakodate | 18.8 (7th) | 16 | 1st | 2:03.6 | Suguru Hamanaka | –0.2 | (Meiner Virtus) | |
| Aug 21 | Turf 2000 m (Good) | Sapporo Kinen | GII | Sapporo | 29.1 (8th) | 16 | 10th | 2:02.4 | Kenichi Ikezoe | 1.2 | Jack d'Or | |
| Dec 10 | Turf 2000 m (Good) | Chunichi Shimbun Hai | GIII | Chukyo | 48.9 (12th) | 18 | 5th | 1:59.5 | Suguru Hamanaka | 0.1 | Killer Ability | |
2023 – seven-year-old season
| Jan 15 | Turf 2200 m (Yielding) | Nikkei Shinshun Hai | GII | Chukyo | 23.1 (7th) | 14 | 6th | 2:14.7 | Hayato Yoshida | 0.5 | Weltreisende | |
| Mar 12 | Turf 2000 m (Good) | Kinko Sho | GII | Chukyo | 41.9 (8th) | 12 | 4th | 2:00.3 | Hideaki Miyuki | 0.5 | Prognosis | |
| May 7 | Turf 2000 m (Heavy) | Niigata Daishoten | GIII | Niigata | 6.6 (3rd) | 16 | 6th | 2:05.9 | Genki Maruyama | 2.1 | Karate | |
| Jul 16 | Turf 2000 m (Yielding) | Hakodate Kinen | GIII | Hakodate | 15.2 (7th) | 16 | 5th | 2:01.8 | Suguru Hamanaka | 0.4 | Rousham Park | |
| Sep 24 | Turf 2200 m (Good) | Sankei Sho All Comers | GII | Nakayama | 114.7 (12th) | 15 | 10th | 2:12.9 | Suguru Hamanaka | 0.9 | Rousham Park | |
| Dec 9 | Turf 2000 m (Good) | Chunichi Shimbun Hai | GIII | Chukyo | 35.0 (13th) | 17 | 2nd | 1:58.9 | Hideaki Miyuki | 0.1 | Yamanin Salvum | |
2024 – eight-year-old season
| Mar 10 | Turf 2000 m (Good) | Kinko Sho | GII | Chukyo | 43.7 (8th) | 13 | 4th | 1:58.7 | Hideaki Miyuki | 1.1 | Prognosis | |
| Mar 31 | Turf 2000 m (Good) | Osaka Hai | GI | Hanshin | 139.5 (15th) | 16 | 12th | 1:59.0 | Hideaki Miyuki | 0.8 | Bellagio Opera | |
| Jul 14 | Turf 2000 m (Good) | Hakodate Kinen | GIII | Hakodate | 28.9 (12th) | 16 | 12th | 2:00.6 | Suguru Hamanaka | 1.4 | Ho O Biscuits | |
| Sep 1 | Turf 2600 m (Yielding) | Thailand Cup | Open | Sapporo | 11.4 (5th) | 14 | 3rd | 2:42.3 | Yuichi Kitamura | 0.8 | Shonan Bashitto | |
| Nov 3 | Turf 2500 m (Good) | Copa Republica Argentina | GII | Tokyo | 35.3 (10th) | 16 | 1st | 2:29.0 | Yutaka Yoshida | –0.1 | (Chrominance) | |
| Dec 22 | Turf 2500 m (Good) | Arima Kinen | GI | Nakayama | 57.1 (13th) | 15 | 15th | 2:33.7 | Yutaka Yoshida | 1.9 | Regaleira | |
2025 – nine-year-old season
| Mar 29 | Turf 2500 m (Yielding) | Nikkei Sho | GII | Nakayama | 24.3 (7th) | 15 | 10th | 2:36.5 | Yutaka Yoshida | 0.4 | Meiner Emperor | |
| Jun 1 | Turf 2500 m (Good) | Meguro Kinen | GII | Tokyo | 18.1 (7th) | 18 | Pulled up | – | Michael Dee | – | Admire Terra | |

== Pedigree ==
Pedigree of Hayayakko (JPN)
| Sire King Kamehameha (JPN) 2001 | Kingmambo (USA); 1990 | Mr. Prospector | Raise a Native |
| Sire King Kamehameha (JPN) 2001 | Kingmambo (USA); 1990 | Mr. Prospector | Gold Digger |
| Sire King Kamehameha (JPN) 2001 | Kingmambo (USA); 1990 | Miesque | Nureyev |
| Sire King Kamehameha (JPN) 2001 | Kingmambo (USA); 1990 | Miesque | Pasadoble |
| Sire King Kamehameha (JPN) 2001 | Manfath (IRE); 1991 | Last Tycoon | Try My Best |
| Sire King Kamehameha (JPN) 2001 | Manfath (IRE); 1991 | Last Tycoon | Mill Princess |
| Sire King Kamehameha (JPN) 2001 | Manfath (IRE); 1991 | Pilot Bird | Blakeney |
| Sire King Kamehameha (JPN) 2001 | Manfath (IRE); 1991 | Pilot Bird | The Dancer |
| Dam Marshmallow (JPN) 2009 | Kurofune (USA); 1998 | French Deputy | Deputy Minister |
| Dam Marshmallow (JPN) 2009 | Kurofune (USA); 1998 | French Deputy | Mitterand |
| Dam Marshmallow (JPN) 2009 | Kurofune (USA); 1998 | Blue Avenue | Classic Go Go |
| Dam Marshmallow (JPN) 2009 | Kurofune (USA); 1998 | Blue Avenue | Eliza Blue |
| Dam Marshmallow (JPN) 2009 | Shirayukihime (JPN); 1996 | Sunday Silence | Halo |
| Dam Marshmallow (JPN) 2009 | Shirayukihime (JPN); 1996 | Sunday Silence | Wishing Well |
| Dam Marshmallow (JPN) 2009 | Shirayukihime (JPN); 1996 | Wave Wind | Topsider |
| Dam Marshmallow (JPN) 2009 | Shirayukihime (JPN); 1996 | Wave Wind | Storm and Sunshine |

- Hayayakko is inbred 5 × 5 × 5 to Northern Dancer.
- He is part of the Shirayukihime white horse family. His close relatives include Sodashi, Meikei Yell, Mama Cocha, and Yukichan.

== See also ==
- Thoroughbred racing in Japan
