= Shirayukihime =

Japanese Thoroughbred broodmare (1996–2019)

Shirayukihime シラユキヒメ
- Breed: Thoroughbred
- Sire: Sunday Silence
- Grandsire: Halo
- Dam: Wave Wind
- Damsire: Topsider
- Sex: Mare
- Foaled: 4 April 1996
- Died: 5 May 2019 (aged 23)
- Country: Japan
- Colour: White
- Breeder: Northern Farm
- Owner: Makoto Kaneko
- Racing colours
- Trainer: Yoshiyuki Goto
- Record: 9: 0-0-1
- Earnings: ¥1,900,000

Shirayukihime (Japanese: シラユキヒメ, Hepburn: Shirayukihime; 4 April 1996 – 5 May 2019) was a Japanese Thoroughbred racehorse and broodmare. She competed in 2001, recording no wins in nine starts. She is notable for being a white-coated horse born from a spontaneous KIT gene mutation (designated W14), and for establishing a lineage of white-coated racehorses as a broodmare. Her descendants include Sodashi, the first white horse to win a Japanese Classic, and Hayayakko, the first white horse to win a JRA graded stakes race.

== Background ==
Shirayukihime was a white mare bred in Hayakita (now Abira), Hokkaido, by Northern Farm. She was sired by Sunday Silence and her dam was Wave Wind, a bay mare by the American stallion Topsider. Despite both parents being dark-coated (Sunday Silence was dark bay, Wave Wind was bay), Shirayukihime was born white due to a spontaneous mutation in the KIT gene. The mutation, designated W14, is a 54-base-pair deletion in exon 17 (c.2392_2445del) that causes an 18-amino-acid deletion in the tyrosine kinase domain II of the stem cell factor receptor (SCFR). This disrupts melanocyte precursor cell migration, resulting in a white or spotted coat. The probability of such a spontaneous white mutation occurring is estimated at 1 in 10,000 to 1 in 20,000. Her racing name is derived from the Grimm's Fairy Tales character Snow White. She was owned by Makoto Kaneko and sent into training with Yoshiyuki Goto at the JRA's Miho Training Center.

== Racing career ==
Shirayukihime debuted on February 3, 2001, in a 5-million-yen allowance race on the turf at Kokura Racecourse, finishing eleventh. She ran in eight subsequent races through September 2001, all in the 5-million-yen or 9-million-yen allowance classes. Her best finish was third in a 5-million-yen allowance race over 2000 meters at Fukushima Racecourse on May 13, 2001. This was the first time a white-coated horse finished in the top three in a JRA race. She did not win any of her nine starts and earned ¥1,900,000 in total.

== Statistics ==
The following table details all 9 starts of Shirayukihime's racing career based on official netkeiba and JBIS records.

Date	Course	Race	Class	Distance (Condition)	Odds (Favourite)	Field	Finish	Time	Winning (Losing) Margin	Jockey	Winner (2nd Place)	Ref
2001 – five-year-old season
Feb 3	Kokura	4YO+ Allowance	1 Win	Turf 1200 m (Firm)	13.0 (5th)	16	11th	1:11.0	0.8	Yoshiyuki Aoki	Sky Jump	
Feb 10	Kokura	4YO+ Allowance	1 Win	Turf 2000 m (Firm)	14.6 (5th)	16	12th	2:05.0	1.3	Yoshiyuki Aoki	Jin Perfect	
Mar 4	Chukyo	4YO+ Allowance	1 Win	Dirt 2300 m (Muddy)	20.2 (8th)	16	14th	2:05.0	5.2	Koshiro Take	Eishin Jordan	
May 4	Fukushima	Iwaki Tokubetsu	1 Win	Turf 1700 m (Firm)	32.3 (10th)	13	8th	1:44.2	1.2	Yoshikazu Yokoyama	Noble Derby	
May 13	Fukushima	4YO+ Allowance	1 Win	Turf 2000 m (Firm)	6.5 (4th)	16	3rd	2:03.0	0.2	Masaki Katsura	Silver Meteor	
Jun 9	Hakodate	Okushiri Tokubetsu	1 Win	Turf 2000 m (Firm)	15.6 (5th)	15	10th	2:05.0	0.8	Norihiro Yokoyama	Daiichi Line	
Jun 17	Hakodate	Yunokawa Tokubetsu	1 Win	Turf 2000 m (Firm)	28.0 (5th)	15	9th	2:03.2	1.5	Masaki Katsura	New England	
Sep 15	Sapporo	Niseko Tokubetsu	1 Win	Turf 1200 m (Firm)	59.7 (11th)	11	8th	1:10.8	0.5	Yūichi Shikato	Delikit	
Sep 23	Sapporo	Eniwadake Tokubetsu	1 Win	Turf 2000 m (Firm)	25.1 (7th)	12	9th	2:04.1	1.2	Yūichi Shikato	Soun Senpu	

== Broodmare career ==
Following her retirement from racing, Shirayukihime became a broodmare at Northern Farm. Because the W14 white mutation is dominant over other coat colours, approximately 50% of her foals were born white or spotted, following Mendelian inheritance. She was mated with three stallions owned by Makoto Kaneko: Black Hawk, Kurofune, and King Kamehameha. Her broodmare registration was cancelled on February 7, 2017. She died on May 5, 2019.

c = colt, f = filly

Foaled	Name	Sex	Colour	Sire	Record / Major wins
2003	Shirokun	c	White	Black Hawk	5 starts, 0 wins
2004	White Vessel	c	White	Kurofune	17 starts, 3 wins. First white horse to win a JRA race (2007).
2005	Yukichan	f	White	Kurofune	17 starts, 5 wins. Kantō Oaks (JpnII), Queen Sho (JpnIII), TCK Ōi Hai (JpnIII). First white horse to win a graded race.
2007	Mama's Dish	f	Gray	Kurofune	10 starts, 0 wins
2008	Shirobee	c	White	Kurofune	Unraced. Lead pony at Kyoto Racecourse.
2009	Marshmallow	f	White	Kurofune	12 starts, 2 wins. First white horse to win a JRA maiden race (2011). Dam of Hayayakko.
2010	Blanc Manger	f	White	Kurofune	3 starts, 0 wins. Dam of Danon Harlock.
2011	Marble Cake	f	White	King Kamehameha	17 starts, 3 wins
2012	Buchiko	f	White	King Kamehameha	16 starts, 4 wins. Dam of Sodashi and Mama Cocha.
2014	Shironii	c	White	King Kamehameha	49 starts, 4 wins. First white stallion to run in a GI (2021 Tennō Shō Spring).
2015	Shirayukihime 2015	f	Bay	King Kamehameha	Unraced
2016	Butchini	f	White	King Kamehameha	18 starts, 3 wins

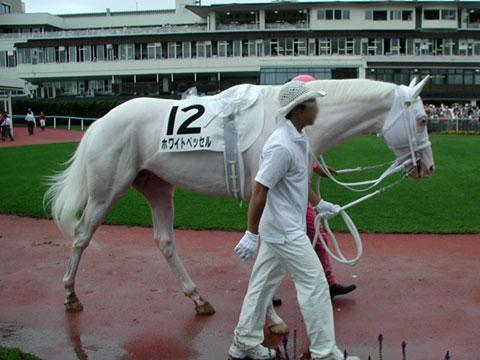
White Vessel

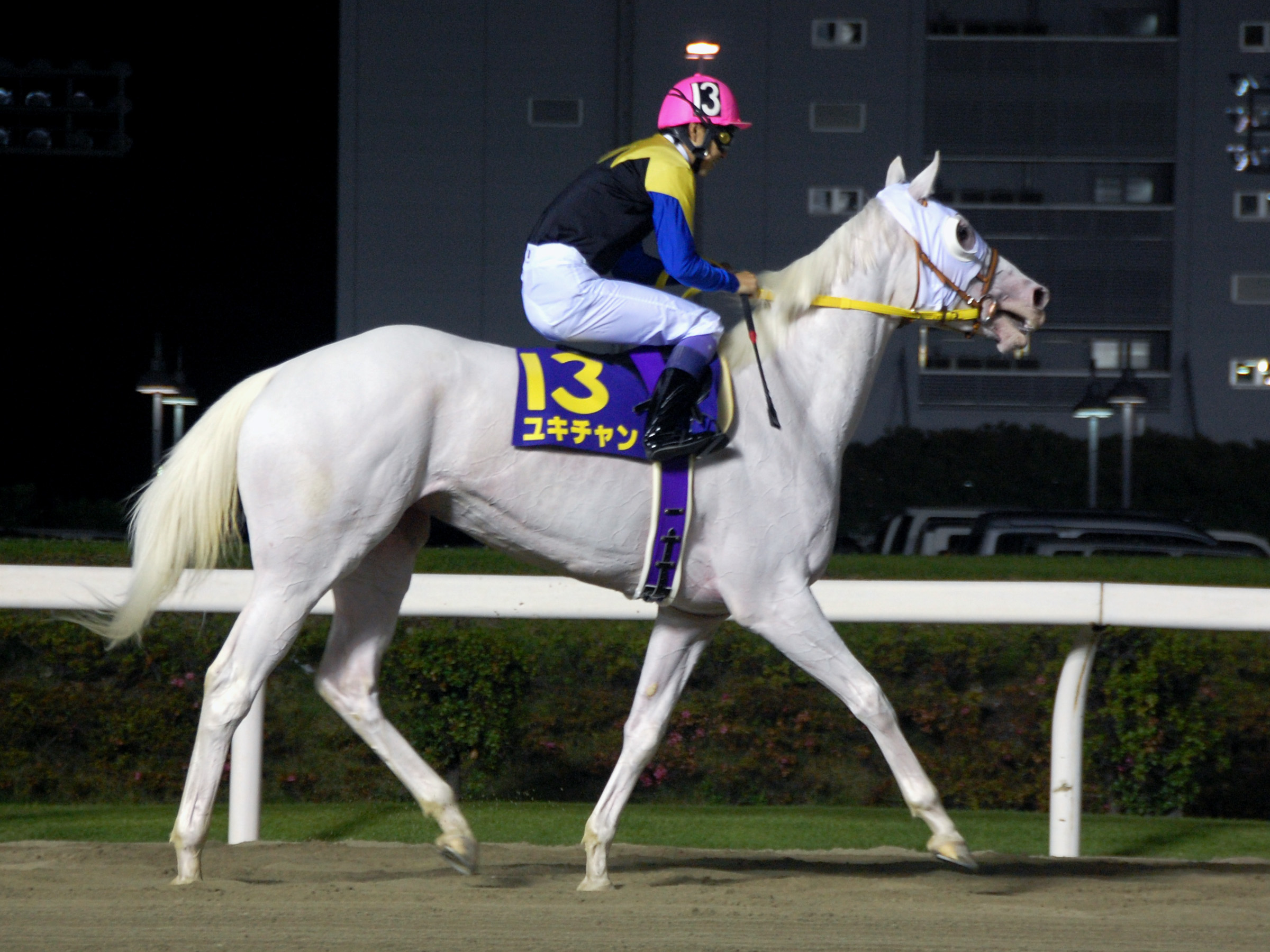
Yukichan

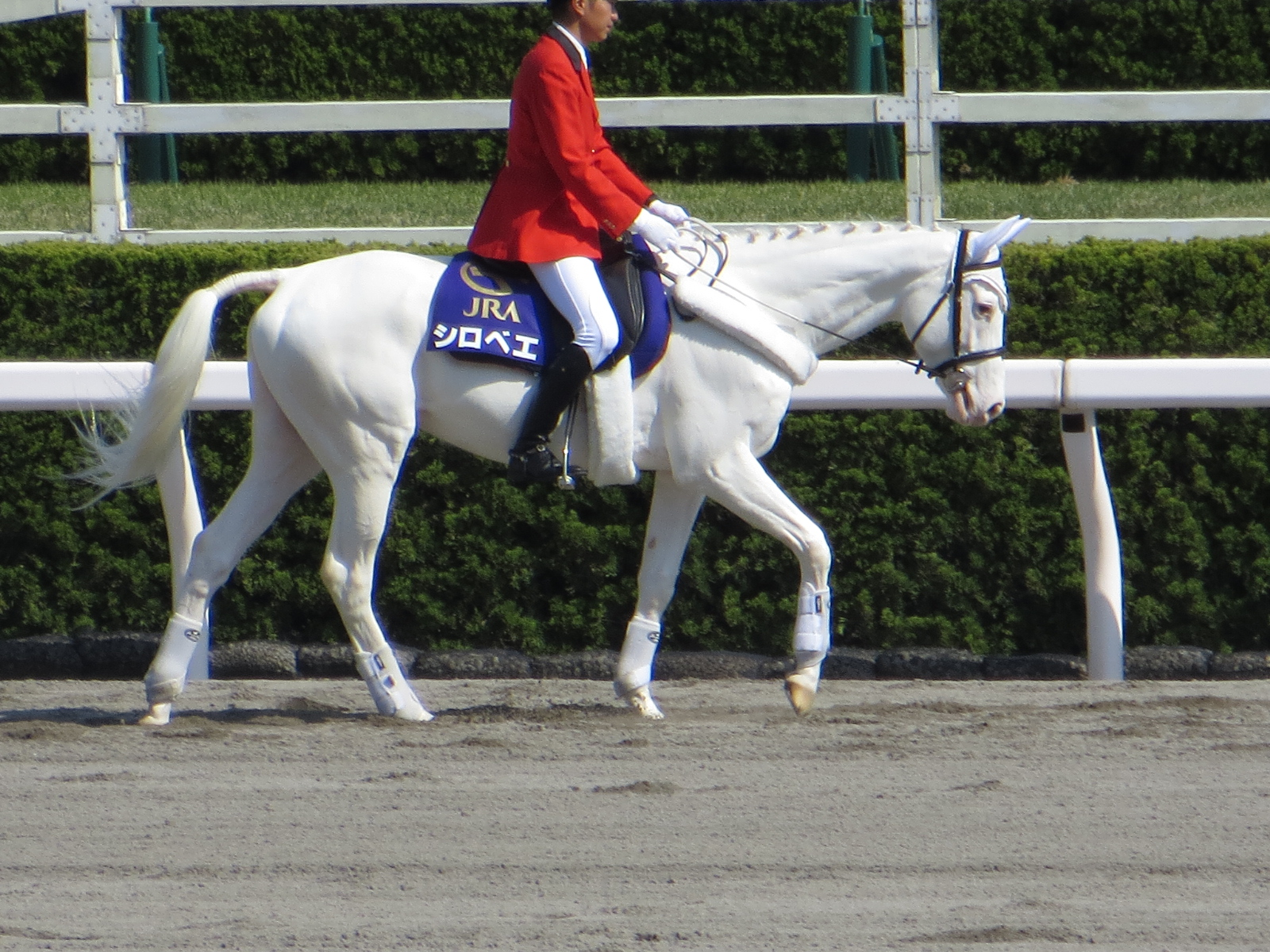
Shirobee

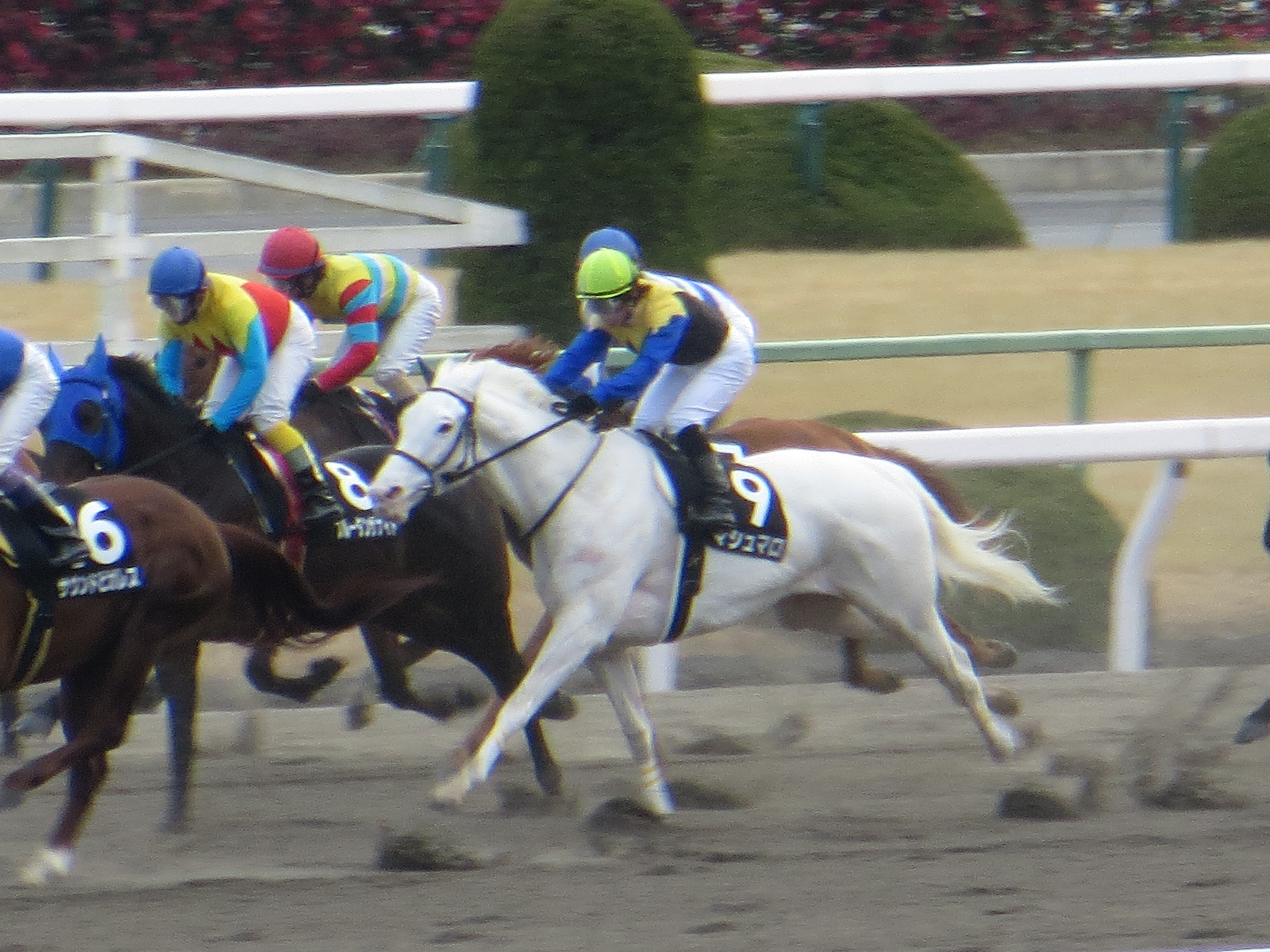
Marshmallow

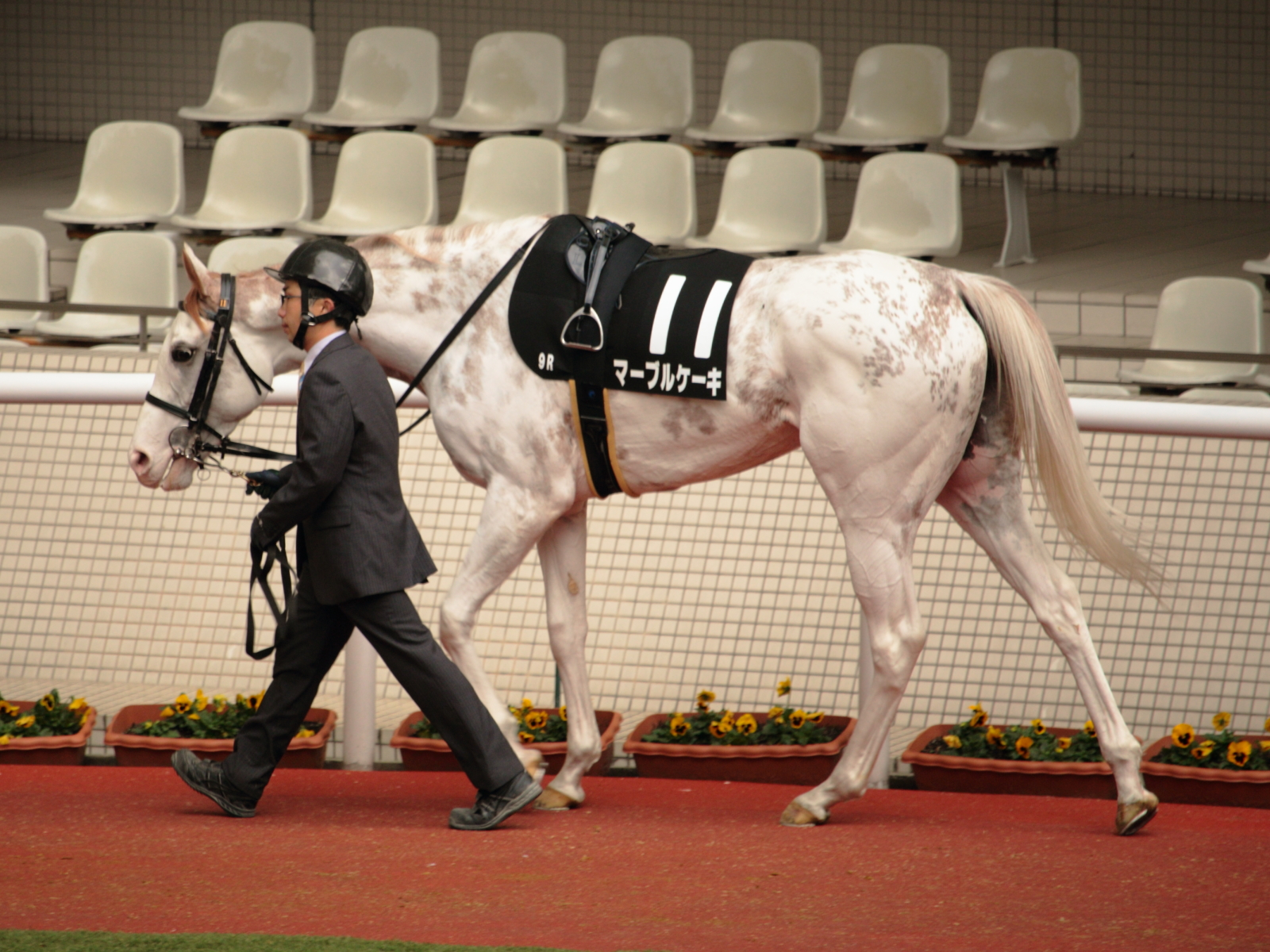
Marble Cake

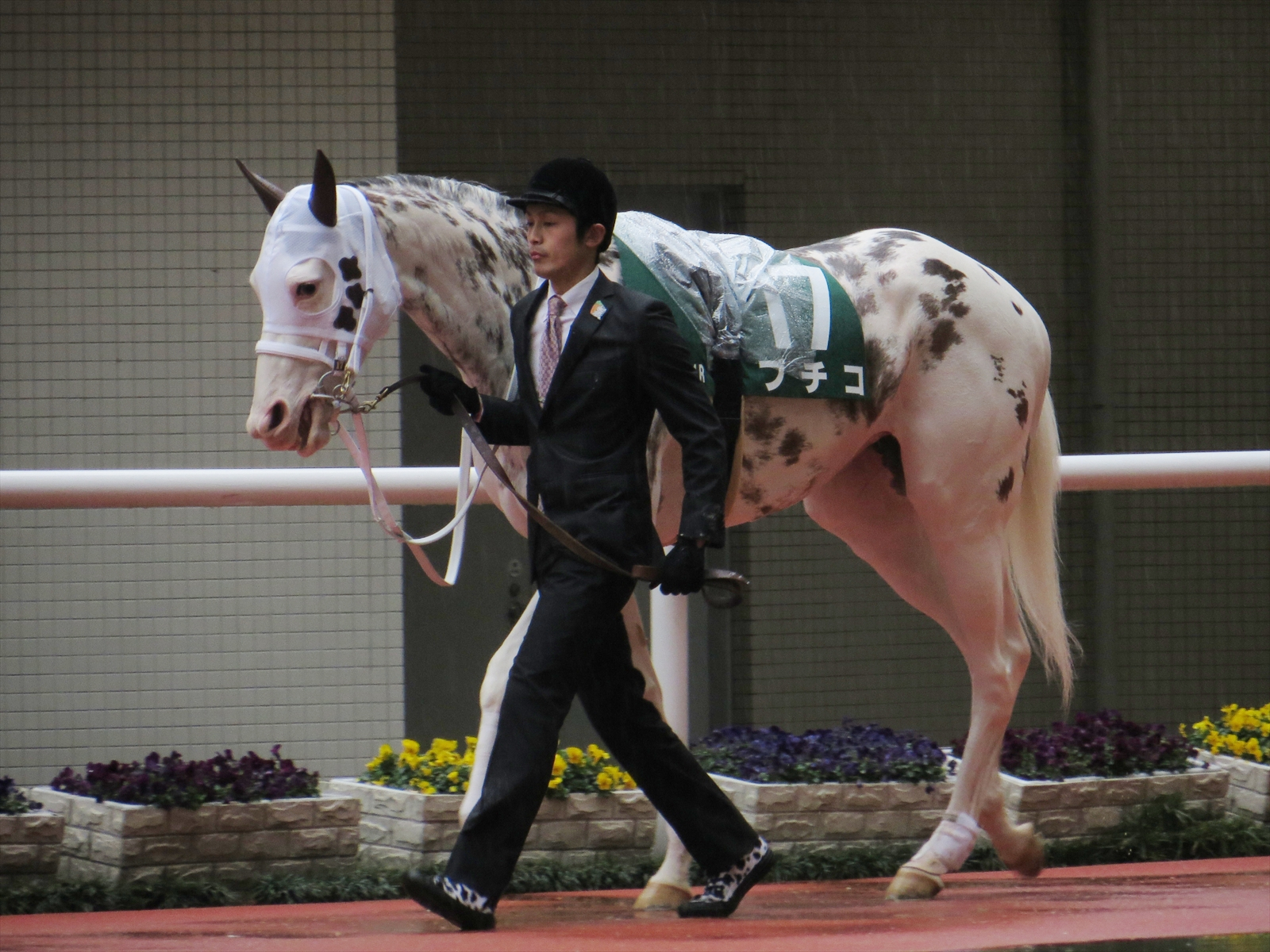
Buchiko

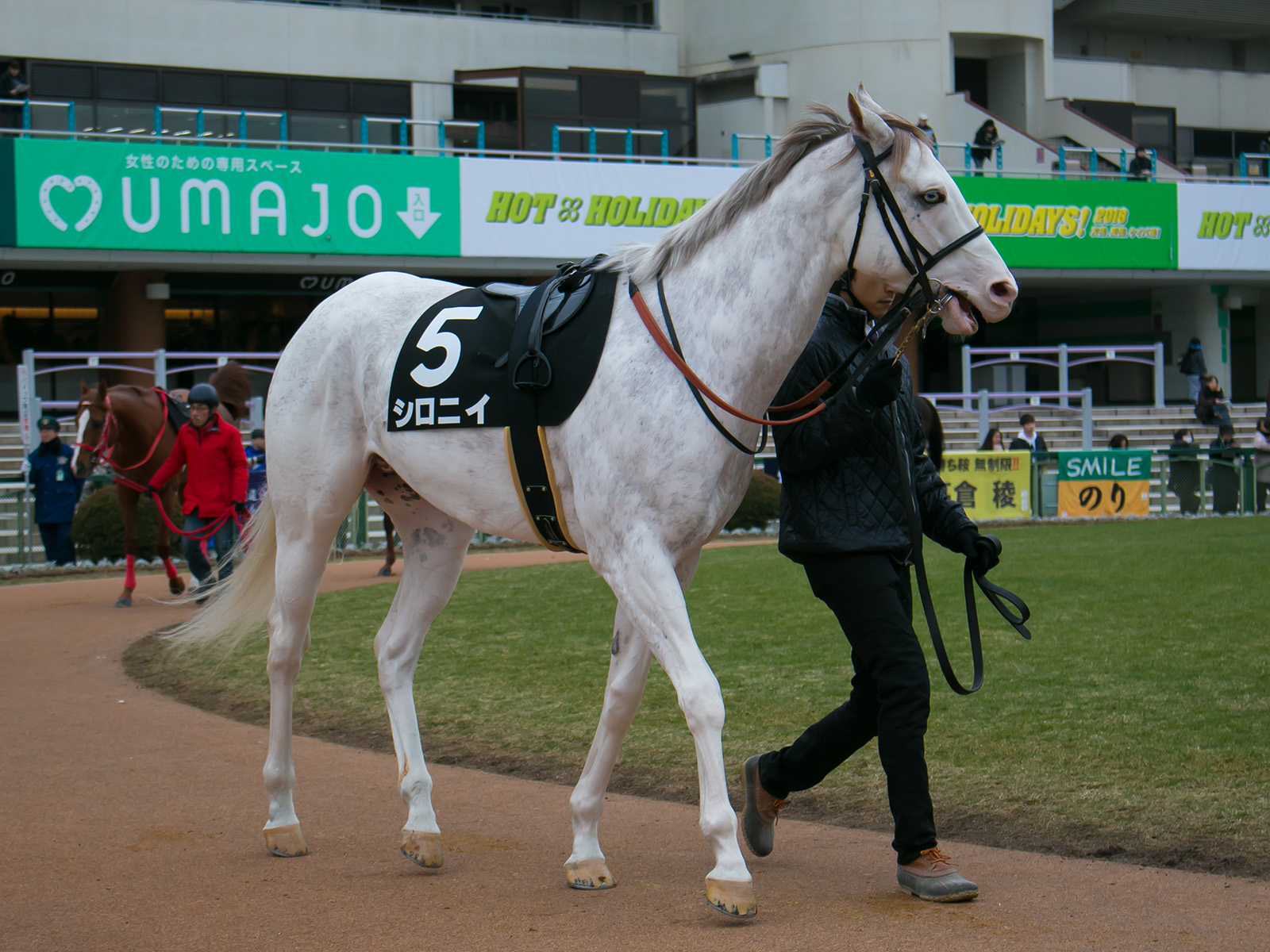
Shironii

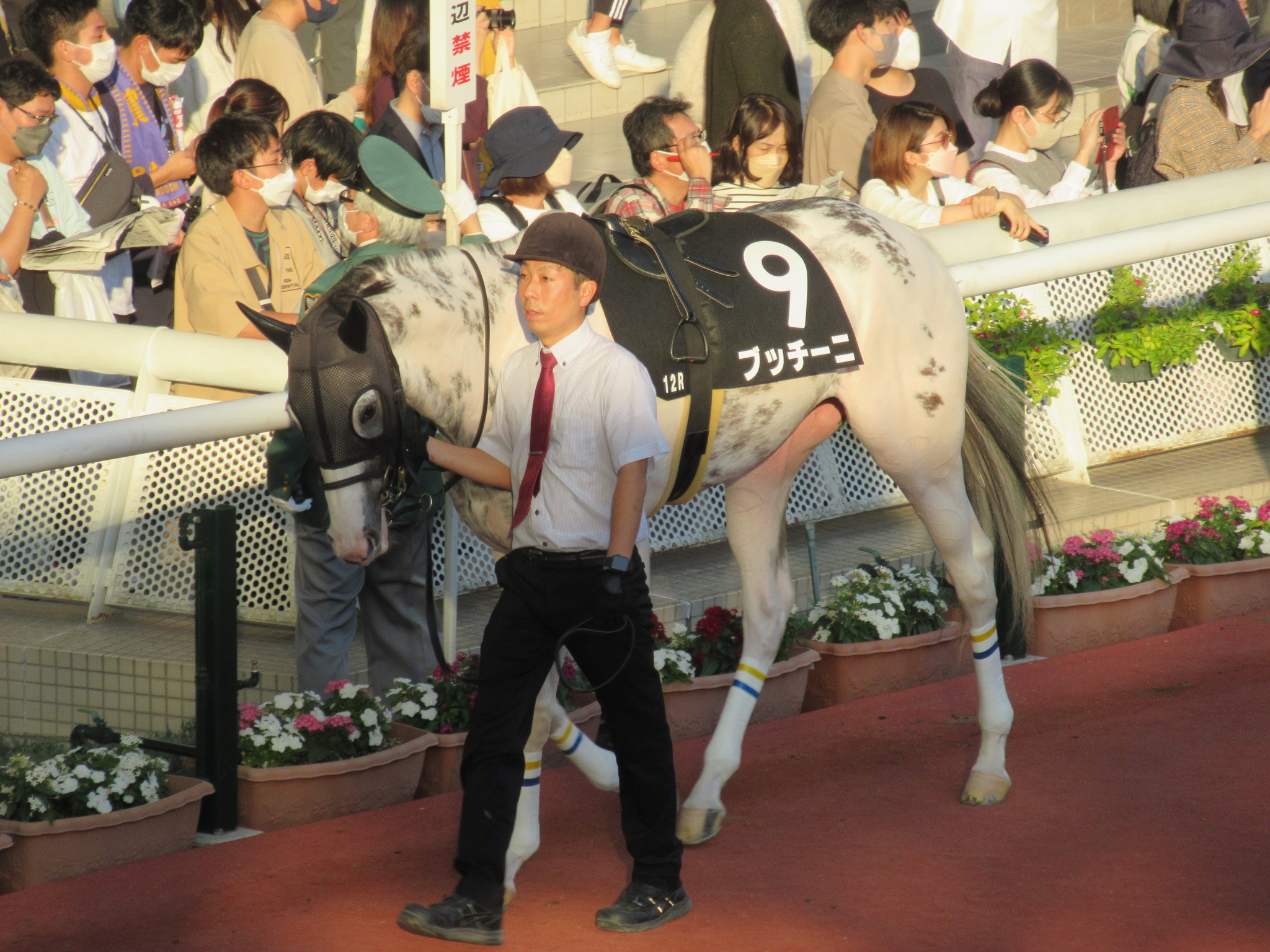
Butchini

=== Notable descendants ===
Shirayukihime's white-coated lineage includes the following graded stakes winners:

- Hayayakko (2016, c, white, by King Kamehameha, out of Marshmallow) – Leopard Stakes (GIII, 2019). First white horse to win a JRA graded stakes race.
- Sodashi (2018, f, white, by Kurofune, out of Buchiko) – Sapporo Nisai Stakes (GIII, 2020), Hanshin Juvenile Fillies (GI, 2020), Oka Shō (GI, 2021), Victoria Mile (GI, 2022). First white horse to win a GI and a Japanese Classic.
- Meikei Yell (2018, f, bay, by Mikki Isle, out of Shiroinger) - Kokura Nisai Stakes (GIII, 2020), Fantasy Stakes (GIII, 2020), Tulip Sho (GII, 2021), Silk Road Stakes (GIII, 2022), Keio Hai Spring Cup (GII, 2022), Centaur Stakes (GII, 2022)
- Mama Cocha (2019, f, bay, by Kurofune, out of Buchiko) – Sprinters Stakes (GI, 2023).
- Amante Bianco (2021, c, white, by Henny Hughes, out of Yukichan) - Haneda Hai (JpnI, 2024)

== White coat genetics ==
The white coat of Shirayukihime and her descendants is caused by the W14 mutation in the KIT gene. This mutation is a 54-base-pair deletion in exon 17 (c.2392_2445del), resulting in an 18-amino-acid deletion in the tyrosine kinase domain II of the stem cell factor receptor (SCFR). Because the mutation occurs in the intracellular domain, it reduces SCFR activity by up to 75%, producing a more severe white phenotype than mutations in the extracellular domain. Horses carrying one copy of W14 may be fully white, spotted (buchi), or have partial white markings. Horses homozygous for W14 are presumed non-viable.

== Pedigree ==
Pedigree of Shirayukihime (JPN)
Sire Sunday Silence (USA) 1986	Halo; 1969	Hail to Reason	Turn-to
Sire Sunday Silence (USA) 1986	Halo; 1969	Hail to Reason	Nothirdchance
Sire Sunday Silence (USA) 1986	Halo; 1969	Cosmah	Cosmic Bomb
Sire Sunday Silence (USA) 1986	Halo; 1969	Cosmah	Almahmoud
Sire Sunday Silence (USA) 1986	Wishing Well; 1975	Understanding	Promised Land
Sire Sunday Silence (USA) 1986	Wishing Well; 1975	Understanding	Pretty Ways
Sire Sunday Silence (USA) 1986	Wishing Well; 1975	Mountain Flower	Montparnasse
Sire Sunday Silence (USA) 1986	Wishing Well; 1975	Mountain Flower	Edelweiss
Dam Wave Wind (USA) 1991	Topsider; 1974	Northern Dancer	Nearctic
Dam Wave Wind (USA) 1991	Topsider; 1974	Northern Dancer	Natalma
Dam Wave Wind (USA) 1991	Topsider; 1974	Drumtop	Round Table
Dam Wave Wind (USA) 1991	Topsider; 1974	Drumtop	Zonah
Dam Wave Wind (USA) 1991	Storm and Sunshine; 1983	Star de Naskra	Naskra
Dam Wave Wind (USA) 1991	Storm and Sunshine; 1983	Star de Naskra	Candle Star
Dam Wave Wind (USA) 1991	Storm and Sunshine; 1983	Sea Drone	Drone
Dam Wave Wind (USA) 1991	Storm and Sunshine; 1983	Sea Drone	Malaga

- Shirayukihime is inbred 4 × 5 to Almahmoud.
- Her dam Wave Wind was unraced. Her granddam Storm and Sunshine won a Grade 2 race in the United States.

== See also ==
- Thoroughbred racing in Japan
- Sodashi
- White (horse)
