= Meikei Yell =

Japanese Thoroughbred racehorse (foaled 2018)

Meikei Yell; メイケイエール
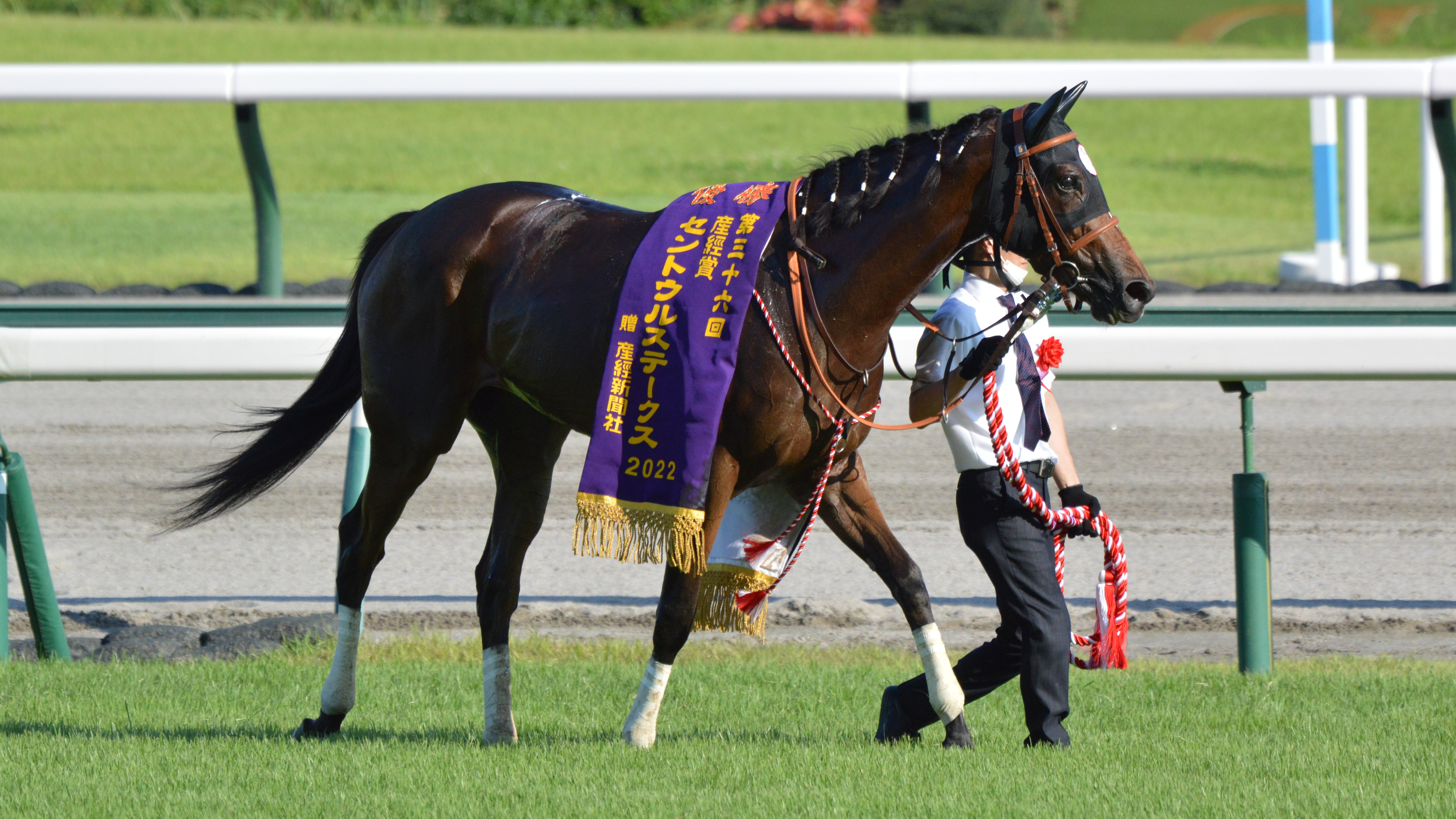
- Meikei Yell at the 2022 Centaur Stakes
- Breed: Thoroughbred
- Sire: Mikki Isle
- Grandsire: Deep Impact
- Dam: Shiroinger
- Damsire: Harbinger
- Sex: Filly
- Foaled: 23 February 2018
- Country: Japan
- Colour: Bay
- Breeder: Northern Farm
- Owner: Nagoya Keiba Co.
- Racing colours
- Trainer: Hidenori Take
- Jockey: Kenichi Ikezoe
- Record: 20: 7-0-0
- Earnings: ¥343,057,200

Major wins
- Tulip Sho (2021); Keio Hai Spring Cup (2022); Centaur Stakes (2022); Kokura Nisai Stakes (2020); Fantasy Stakes (2020); Silk Road Stakes (2022)

Meikei Yell (Japanese: メイケイエール, Meikei Ēru; foaled 23 February 2018) is a retired Japanese Thoroughbred racehorse. She competed from 2020 to 2024, recording seven wins from twenty starts, including the Tulip Sho (GII) in 2021, the Keio Hai Spring Cup (GII) in 2022, the Centaur Stakes (GII) in 2022, the Kokura Nisai Stakes (GIII) in 2020, the Fantasy Stakes (GIII) in 2020, and the Silk Road Stakes (GIII) in 2022. She never won a GI race despite ten attempts. Her name combines "Meikei," the owner's prefix, with "Yell" (応援).

== Background ==
Meikei Yell is a bay filly bred in Abira, Hokkaido, by Northern Farm. She was sired by Mikki Isle, a son of Deep Impact, and her dam was Shiroinger (シロインジャー), a white mare by Harbinger. Shiroinger is a descendant of the white horse family tracing back to Shirayukihime (シラユキヒメ); Meikei Yell's dam is white but Meikei Yell herself is bay. She is owned by Nagoya Keiba Co., Ltd., owner of the Chukyo Racecourse, and was trained by Hidenori Take at the JRA's Ritto Training Center.

== Racing career ==
=== 2020: two-year-old season ===
Meikei Yell debuted on 22 August 2020 in a maiden race at Kokura Racecourse, winning by 0.8 seconds. She won the Kokura Nisai Stakes (GIII) on 6 September and the Fantasy Stakes (GIII) at Hanshin Racecourse on 7 November in a race-record time of 1:20.1. She finished fourth in the Hanshin Juvenile Fillies (GI) on 13 December.

=== 2021: three-year-old season ===
Meikei Yell won the Tulip Sho (GII) at Hanshin on 6 March in a dead heat with Elizabeth Tower. She finished last of eighteen in the Oka Shō (GI) on 11 April after failing to settle. She finished seventh in the Keeneland Cup (GIII) on 29 August and fourth in the Sprinters Stakes (GI) on 3 October.

=== 2022: four-year-old season ===
Meikei Yell won the Silk Road Stakes (GIII) at Chukyo Racecourse on 30 January. She finished fifth in the Takamatsunomiya Kinen (GI) on 27 March. She won the Keio Hai Spring Cup (GII) at Tokyo Racecourse on 14 May. She won the Centaur Stakes (GII) at Chukyo on 11 September in a race-record time of 1:06.2. She finished fourteenth in the Sprinters Stakes (GI) on 2 October and fifth in the Hong Kong Sprint (G1) at Sha Tin Racecourse on 11 December.

=== 2023: five-year-old season ===
Meikei Yell finished twelfth in the Takamatsunomiya Kinen (GI) on 26 March, fifteenth in the Yasuda Kinen (GI) on 4 June, and fifth in the Sprinters Stakes (GI) on 1 October. She finished ninth in the Breeders' Cup Filly & Mare Sprint (G1) at Santa Anita Park on 4 November, her first dirt start.

=== 2024: six-year-old season ===
Meikei Yell finished tenth in the Kyoto Himba Stakes (GIII) on 17 February. Her final race was the Takamatsunomiya Kinen (GI) on 24 March, where she finished ninth. A retirement ceremony was held after the race. She was retired on 27 March 2024 and entered stud at Northern Farm.

== Statistics ==
The following table details all 20 starts of Meikei Yell's racing career. Record current as of 24 March 2024.

Date	Distance (Condition)	Race	Class	Course	Odds (Favourite)	Field	Finish	Time	Jockey	Winning (Losing) Margin	Winner (2nd Place)	Ref
2020 – two-year-old season
Aug 22	Turf 1200 m (Good)	2-Y-O Newcomer	Maiden	Kokura	1.9 (1st)	17	1st	1:09.4	Yuichi Fukunaga	–0.8	(Pegasus Wing)	
Sep 6	Turf 1200 m (Heavy)	Kokura Nisai Stakes	GIII	Kokura	6.3 (2nd)	10	1st	1:09.6	Yutaka Take	–0.2	(Mondreise)	
Nov 7	Turf 1400 m (Good)	Fantasy Stakes	GIII	Hanshin	2.5 (1st)	12	1st	R1:20.1	Yutaka Take	–0.1	(Opal Moon)	
Dec 13	Turf 1600 m (Good)	Hanshin Juvenile Fillies	GI	Hanshin	4.7 (3rd)	18	4th	1:33.3	Yutaka Take	0.2	Sodashi	
2021 – three-year-old season
Mar 6	Turf 1600 m (Yielding)	Tulip Sho	GII	Hanshin	1.6 (1st)	12	1st	1:33.8	Yutaka Take	0.0	(Elizabeth Tower)	
Apr 11	Turf 1600 m (Good)	Oka Shō	GI	Hanshin	6.4 (3rd)	18	18th	1:34.0	Norihiro Yokoyama	2.9	Sodashi	
Aug 29	Turf 1200 m (Good)	Keeneland Cup	GIII	Sapporo	2.8 (1st)	16	7th	1:09.4	Yutaka Take	0.3	Lei Haria	
Oct 3	Turf 1200 m (Good)	Sprinters Stakes	GI	Nakayama	24.9 (7th)	16	4th	1:07.8	Kenichi Ikezoe	0.7	Pixie Knight	
2022 – four-year-old season
Jan 30	Turf 1200 m (Good)	Silk Road Stakes	GIII	Chukyo	4.0 (2nd)	18	1st	1:08.1	Kenichi Ikezoe	–0.1	(Shine Garnet)	
Mar 27	Turf 1200 m (Heavy)	Takamatsunomiya Kinen	GI	Chukyo	5.2 (2nd)	18	5th	1:08.4	Kenichi Ikezoe	0.1	Naran Huleg	
May 14	Turf 1400 m (Good)	Keio Hai Spring Cup	GII	Tokyo	3.1 (1st)	12	1st	1:20.2	Kenichi Ikezoe	–0.1	(Sky Groove)	
Sep 11	Turf 1200 m (Good)	Centaur Stakes	GII	Chukyo	1.7 (1st)	13	1st	R1:06.2	Kenichi Ikezoe	–0.4	(Fast Force)	
Oct 2	Turf 1200 m (Good)	Sprinters Stakes	GI	Nakayama	2.5 (1st)	16	14th	1:08.7	Kenichi Ikezoe	0.9	Gendarme	
Dec 11	Turf 1200 m (Good)	Hong Kong Sprint	G1	Sha Tin	22.0 (6th)	14	5th	1:09.02	James McDonald	0.26	Wellington	
2023 – five-year-old season
Mar 26	Turf 1200 m (Soft)	Takamatsunomiya Kinen	GI	Chukyo	4.5 (1st)	18	12th	1:12.6	Kenichi Ikezoe	1.1	Fast Force	
Jun 4	Turf 1600 m (Good)	Yasuda Kinen	GI	Tokyo	37.0 (12th)	18	15th	1:32.7	Kenichi Ikezoe	1.3	Songline	
Oct 1	Turf 1200 m (Good)	Sprinters Stakes	GI	Nakayama	12.4 (5th)	16	5th	1:08.4	Kenichi Ikezoe	0.4	Mama Cocha	
Nov 4	Dirt 1400 m (Fast)	Breeders' Cup Filly & Mare Sprint	G1	Santa Anita	23.5 (6th)	9	9th	1:25.51	Kenichi Ikezoe	2.54	Goodnight Olive	
2024 – six-year-old season
Feb 17	Turf 1400 m (Good)	Kyoto Himba Stakes	GIII	Kyoto	7.6 (3rd)	18	10th	1:20.9	Kenichi Ikezoe	0.6	So Dazzling	
Mar 24	Turf 1200 m (Heavy)	Takamatsunomiya Kinen	GI	Chukyo	21.9 (10th)	18	9th	1:10.0	Kenichi Ikezoe	1.1	Mad Cool	

== Pedigree ==
Pedigree of Meikei Yell (JPN)
Sire Mikki Isle (JPN) 2011	Deep Impact (JPN); 2002	Sunday Silence	Halo
Sire Mikki Isle (JPN) 2011	Deep Impact (JPN); 2002	Sunday Silence	Wishing Well
Sire Mikki Isle (JPN) 2011	Deep Impact (JPN); 2002	Wind in Her Hair	Alzao
Sire Mikki Isle (JPN) 2011	Deep Impact (JPN); 2002	Wind in Her Hair	Burghclere
Sire Mikki Isle (JPN) 2011	Star Isle (IRE); 2004	Rock of Gibraltar	Danehill
Sire Mikki Isle (JPN) 2011	Star Isle (IRE); 2004	Rock of Gibraltar	Offshore Boom
Sire Mikki Isle (JPN) 2011	Star Isle (IRE); 2004	Isle de France	Nureyev
Sire Mikki Isle (JPN) 2011	Star Isle (IRE); 2004	Isle de France	Stella Madrid
Dam Shiroinger (JPN) 2013	Harbinger (GB); 2006	Dansili	Danehill
Dam Shiroinger (JPN) 2013	Harbinger (GB); 2006	Dansili	Hasili
Dam Shiroinger (JPN) 2013	Harbinger (GB); 2006	Penang Pearl	Bering
Dam Shiroinger (JPN) 2013	Harbinger (GB); 2006	Penang Pearl	Guapa
Dam Shiroinger (JPN) 2013	Yukichan (JPN); 2005	Kurofune	French Deputy
Dam Shiroinger (JPN) 2013	Yukichan (JPN); 2005	Kurofune	Blue Avenue
Dam Shiroinger (JPN) 2013	Yukichan (JPN); 2005	Shirayukihime	Sunday Silence
Dam Shiroinger (JPN) 2013	Yukichan (JPN); 2005	Shirayukihime	Wave Wind

- Meikei Yell is inbred 3 × 4 to Sunday Silence and 4 × 4 to Danehill.
- Her sire Mikki Isle won the 2014 NHK Mile Cup.
- Her dam Shiroinger is a white mare. Her grandmother Yukichan won the 2008 Kanto Oaks.
- Her relatives include Sodashi, Mama Cocha, and Hayayakko.

== See also ==
- Thoroughbred racing in Japan
