= Fantasy Stakes (disambiguation) =

Fantasy Stakes is a thoroughbred horse race held at Oaklawn Park, in Hot Springs, Arkansas, U.S.

Fantasy Stakes may also refer to:

- Fantasy Stakes (Japan), held at Kyoto Racecourse, Kyoto, Japan
- Fantasy Stakes (Canada), held at Hastings Racecourse, Vancouver, Canada
