= Kurofune (horse) =

Japanese Thoroughbred racehorse

Kurofune クロフネ
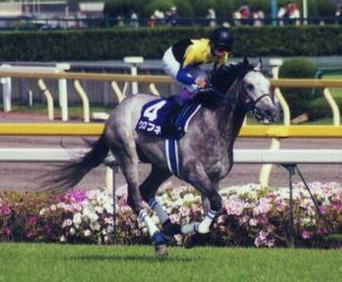
- Kurofune in May 2001
- Breed: Thoroughbred
- Sire: French Deputy
- Grandsire: Deputy Minister
- Dam: Blue Avenue
- Damsire: Classic Go Go
- Sex: Stallion
- Foaled: March 31, 1998
- Died: January 17, 2021 (aged 22)
- Country: United States
- Colour: Grey
- Breeder: Nicholas M. Lotz
- Owner: Makoto Kaneko
- Racing colours
- Trainer: Kunihide Matsuda
- Jockey: Yutaka Take
- Record: 10: 6-1-2
- Earnings: ¥370,235,000

Major wins
- Mainichi Hai (2001); NHK Mile Cup (2001); Musashino Stakes (2001); Japan Cup Dirt (2001)

Awards
- JRA Award for Best Dirt Horse (2001)

Kurofune (Japanese: クロフネ, Hepburn: Kurofune; 31 March 1998 - 17 January 2021) was an American-bred, Japanese-trained Thoroughbred racehorse and sire who won Grade 1 races on both turf and dirt. He showed promising form as a juvenile in 2000 when he won two of four races and ran third in a very strong edition of the Radio Tampa Hai Sansai Stakes. In the following year he took the Mainichi Hai and the NHK Mile Cup in spring on turf before being switched to dirt racing in late autumn and winning the Musashino Stakes and the Japan Cup Dirt. He won six of his ten races, four of them in track record times, before his track career was ended by injury. After his retirement from racing he became a very successful breeding stallion.

== Background ==
Kurofune was a grey horse bred in Kentucky by Nicholas M. Lotz. In September 1999 the yearling was put up for auction at Keeneland and was bought for $70,000 by BNK Stable. In the following year he was consigned to the Fasig-Tipton Florida Select 2-Year-Olds In Training sale at which he was purchased by Katsumi Yoshida for $430,000. The colt was exported to Japan where he entered the ownership of Makoto Kaneko and was sent into training with Kunihide Matsuda.

He was sired by French Deputy who recorded his biggest win in the 1995 Jerome Handicap. As a breeding stallion, the best of his other progeny included Left Bank, Nobo Jack (JBC Sprint), Sleepless Night, (Sprinters Stakes), Reginetta (Oka Sho), Admire Jupiter (Tenno Sho) and Eishin Deputy (Takarazuka Kinen).

Kurofune's dam Blue Avenue, from whom he inherited his grey colour, showed some racing ability, winning five of her twenty races. She was a half-sister to the Vanity Handicap winner Brought To Mind and a great-great-granddaughter of the New Zealand mare Chubin whose other descendants included the Melbourne Cup winner Silver Knight.

The term kurofune derives from the Black Ships, a name given to Western vessels arriving in Japan in the 16th to 19th centuries.

== Racing career ==
=== 2000: two-year-old season ===
Kurofune's first two runs were at Kyoto Racecourse in the autumn of 2000. After finishing third in a maiden race over 1600 metres on 14 October, he then set a track record when he won a similar event over 2000 metres two weeks later. He then appeared at Hanshin Racecourse on 3 December and set another track record when he won the 2000 metres Erica Sho. Later that month at the same venue he was stepped up in class for the Grade 3 Radio Tampa Hai Sansai Stakes and came home third of the twelve runners behind Agnes Tachyon and Jungle Pocket.

=== 2001: three-year-old season ===
On 24 March at Hanshin, Kurofune recorded his first major win when he was a wide-margin winner of the Grade 3 Mainichi Hai over 2000 metres. On his next appearance the colt was brought back to 1600 metres and promoted to Grade 1 level for the NHK Mile Cup at Tokyo Racecourse on 6 May when his opponents included Kitasan Channel (New Zealand Trophy), Kachidoki Ryu (Crystal Cup), Shower Party (Kyoto Nisai Stakes), Shower Party (Daily Hai Sansai Stakes) and T M Southpaw (Keio Hai Sansai Stakes). Ridden by Yutaka Take he won by half a length from Grass Eiko O with three lengths back to the filly Summer Candle in third. Kurofune was moved up in distance for the Tokyo Yushun over 2400 metres three weeks later and came home fifth of the eighteen runners behind Jungle Pocket, Dantsu Flame, Dancing Color and Born King.

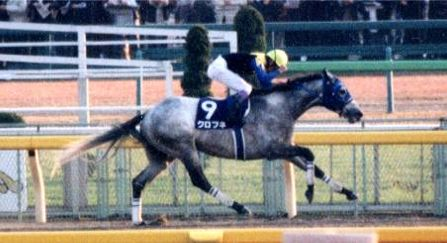
Kurofune wins the Japan Cup Dirt

Following the summer break Kurofune returned in September for the Kobe Shimbun Hai (a trial race for the Kikuka Sho) over 2000 metres at Hanshin and ran third behind Air Eminem and Sunrise Pegasus. Having raced on turf in all of his previous races, Kurofune was switched to the dirt for the Grade 3 Musashino Stakes over 1600 metres at Tokyo on 27 October, winning from Eagle Cafe (2000 NHK Mile Cup) in a new track record of 1:33.3. On 24 November Kurofune was matched against older horses when he contested the Grade 1 Japan Cup Dirt over 2100 metres at Tokyo and started the 0.7/1 favourite ahead of the American challenger Lido Palace. The other fourteen runners included Wing Arrow (winner of the race in the previous year and twice winner of the JRA Award for Best Dirt Horse), Miracle Opera (Mercury Cup), Regular Member (JBC Classic), Nobo True (February Stakes), Generous Rosi (Gordon Richards Stakes), Hagino High Grade (Tokai Stakes) and King of Tara (Prix Eugène Adam). Ridden by Take, Kurofune settled behind the leaders, took the lead on the final turn and drew right away in the straight to win by seven lengths from Wing Arrow. Lido Palace's rider Jerry Bailey commented "[Kurofune] was going so easy. He passed me without any effort, and my horse had no fight in him when the gray horse came to him".

In December it was announced that Kurofune had sustained a serious injury to the tendons in his right foreleg and that he would be unable to race again.

In January 2002 Kurofune was voted Best Dirt Horse in the JRA Awards for 2001.

== Racing form ==
Kurofune won six races in 10 starts with one G1 win in both turf and dirt. This data is available in JBIS and netkeiba.

Date	Track	Race	Grade	Distance (Condition)	Entry	HN	Odds (Favored)	Finish	Time	Margins	Jockey	Winner (Runner-up)
2000 – two-year-old season
Jun 22	Kyoto	2yo Newcomer		1,600 m (Firm)	9	4	6.9 (3)	2nd	1:35.7	0.0	Mikio Matsunaga	Eishin Spencer
Oct 28	Kyoto	2yo Maiden		2,000 m (Firm)	9	3	1.3 (1)	1st	R2:00.7	–0.3	Mikio Matsunaga	(Meiner Escape)
Dec 3	Hanshin	Erica Sho	ALW (1W)	2,000 m (Firm)	12	10	1.3 (1)	1st	R2:01.2	–0.6	Mikio Matsunaga	(Daiichi Dunhill)
Dec 23	Hanshin	Radio Tampa Hai Sansai Stakes	3	2,000 m (Firm)	12	5	1.4 (1)	3rd	2:01.4	0.6	Mikio Matsunaga	Agnes Tachyon
2001 – three-year-old season
Mar 24	Hanshin	Mainichi Hai	3	2,000 m (Firm)	11	2	1.3 (1)	1st	1:58.6	–0.9	Hirofumi Shii	(Coin Toss)
May 6	Tokyo	NHK Mile Cup	1	1,600 m (Firm)	18	4	1.2 (1)	1st	1:33.0	–0.1	Yutaka Take	(Grass Eiko O)
May 27	Tokyo	Tokyo Yushun	1	2,400 m (Soft)	18	17	3.0 (2)	5th	2:27.9	0.9	Yutaka Take	Jungle Pocket
Sep 23	Hanshin	Kobe Shimbun Hai	2	2,000 m (Firm)	12	7	4.4 (2)	3rd	1:59.6	0.1	Masayoshi Ebina	Air Eminem
Oct 27	Hanshin	Musashino Stakes	3	1,600 m (Fast)	15	15	2.3 (1)	1st	R1:33.3	–1.4	Yutaka Take	(Eagle Cafe)
Nov 24	Tokyo	Japan Cup Dirt	1	2,100 m (Fast)	16	9	1.7 (1)	1st	R2:05.9	–1.1	Yutaka Take	(Wing Arrow)

Legend:
Turf Dirt

- R indicates that it was a record time finish

== Stud record ==
After his retirement from racing, Kurofune stood as a breeding stallion at the Shadai Stallion Station before being withdrawn from stud duty in 2019. He was among the top ten sires in Japan on ten occasions and was the most successful sire of Japanese dirt runners in 2009 and 2010. He also sired several rare white foals when bred to Shirayukihime and her daughter Buchiko. Kurofune is the damsire of Chrono Genesis and the Victoria Mile winner Normcore. Kurofune died on 17 January 2021.

=== Major winners ===
c = colt, f = filly
bold = G1/Jpn1 stakes

Grade One winners
Foaled	Name	Sex	Major Wins
2003	Fusaichi Richard	c	Tokyo Sports Hai Nisai Stakes, **Asahi Hai Futurity Stakes**, Hanshin Cup
2004	Sleepless Night	f	CBC Sho, Kitakyushu Kinen, **Sprinters Stakes**
2007	Curren Chan	f	Hanshin Himba Stakes, Hakodate Sprint Stakes, Keeneland Cup, **Sprinters Stakes**, **Takamatsunomiya Kinen**
2008	Whale Capture	f	Queen Cup, Rose Stakes, **Victoria Mile**, Fuchu Himba Stakes, Tokyo Shimbun Hai
2010	Up to Date	c	**Nakayama Grand Jump**, Kokura Summer Jump, **Nakayama Daishogai**, Hanshin Jump Stakes (twice), Hanshin Spring Jump
2012	Clarity Sky	c	**NHK Mile Cup**
2012	White Fugue	f	Kanto Oaks, **JBC Ladies' Classic** (twice), TCK Jo-o Hai, Sparking Lady Cup, Marine Cup, Sakitama Hai
2014	Aerolithe	f	**NHK Mile Cup**, Queen Stakes, Mainichi Ōkan
2018	Sodashi	f	Sapporo Nisai Stakes, Artemis Stakes, **Hanshin Juvenile Fillies**, **Oka Shō**, Sapporo Kinen, **Victoria Mile**
2019	Mama Cocha	f	**Sprinters Stakes**, Ocean Stakes

Other winners
Foaled	Name	Sex	Major Wins
2004	White Melody	f	Kanto Oaks, Queen Sho
2005	Bravo Daisy	f	Fukushima Himba Stakes, Empress Hai
2005	Odile	f	Fantasy Stakes
2005	Yukichan	f	Kanto Oaks, Queen Sho, TCK Jo-o Hai
2007	Dream Sailing	c	Kyoto Jump Stakes
2007	Seiko Raiko	c	Ibis Summer Dash
2008	Marumo Sarah	f	Fantasy Stakes
2009	Earth Sonic	c	Keihan Hai
2010	Impulse Hero	c	Falcon Stakes
2010	Kurofune Surprise	f	Tulip Sho
2010	Meiner Crop	c	Saga Kinen, March Stakes
2010	Stalk and Ray	f	Hakodate Nisai Stakes
2012	T M Jinsoku	c	Miyako Stakes, Tokai Stakes
2013	Oken Believe	f	Cluster Cup
2014	Jeune Ecole	f	Daily Hai Nisai Stakes, Hakodate Sprint Stakes
2015	Pax Americana	c	Kyoto Kimpai
2016	Emeral Fight	c	Spring Stakes
2017	Reine Blanche	f	Kanto Oaks, Ladies' Prelude
2018	Maria Elena	f	Kokura Kinen

== Pedigree ==
Pedigree of Kurofune (USA), grey stallion, 1998
Sire French Deputy (USA) 1992	Deputy Minister (CAN); 1979	Vice Regent	Northern Dancer
Sire French Deputy (USA) 1992	Deputy Minister (CAN); 1979	Vice Regent	Victoria Regina
Sire French Deputy (USA) 1992	Deputy Minister (CAN); 1979	Mint Copy	Bunty's Flight
Sire French Deputy (USA) 1992	Deputy Minister (CAN); 1979	Mint Copy	Shakney (USA)
Sire French Deputy (USA) 1992	Mitterand (USA); 1981	Hold Your Peace	Speak John
Sire French Deputy (USA) 1992	Mitterand (USA); 1981	Hold Your Peace	Blue Moon
Sire French Deputy (USA) 1992	Mitterand (USA); 1981	Laredo Lass	Bold Ruler
Sire French Deputy (USA) 1992	Mitterand (USA); 1981	Laredo Lass	Fortunate Isle
Dam Blue Avenue (USA) 1990	Classic Go Go (USA); 1978	Pago Pago (AUS)	Matrice
Dam Blue Avenue (USA) 1990	Classic Go Go (USA); 1978	Pago Pago (AUS)	Pompilia
Dam Blue Avenue (USA) 1990	Classic Go Go (USA); 1978	Classic Perfection	Never Bend
Dam Blue Avenue (USA) 1990	Classic Go Go (USA); 1978	Classic Perfection	Mira Femme
Dam Blue Avenue (USA) 1990	Eliza Blue (USA); 1983	Icecapade	Nearctic (CAN)
Dam Blue Avenue (USA) 1990	Eliza Blue (USA); 1983	Icecapade	Shenanigans
Dam Blue Avenue (USA) 1990	Eliza Blue (USA); 1983	Corella	Roberto
Dam Blue Avenue (USA) 1990	Eliza Blue (USA); 1983	Corella	Catania (NZ) (Family: 2-r)
