= Hakodate Kinen =

Hakodate Kinen 函館記念
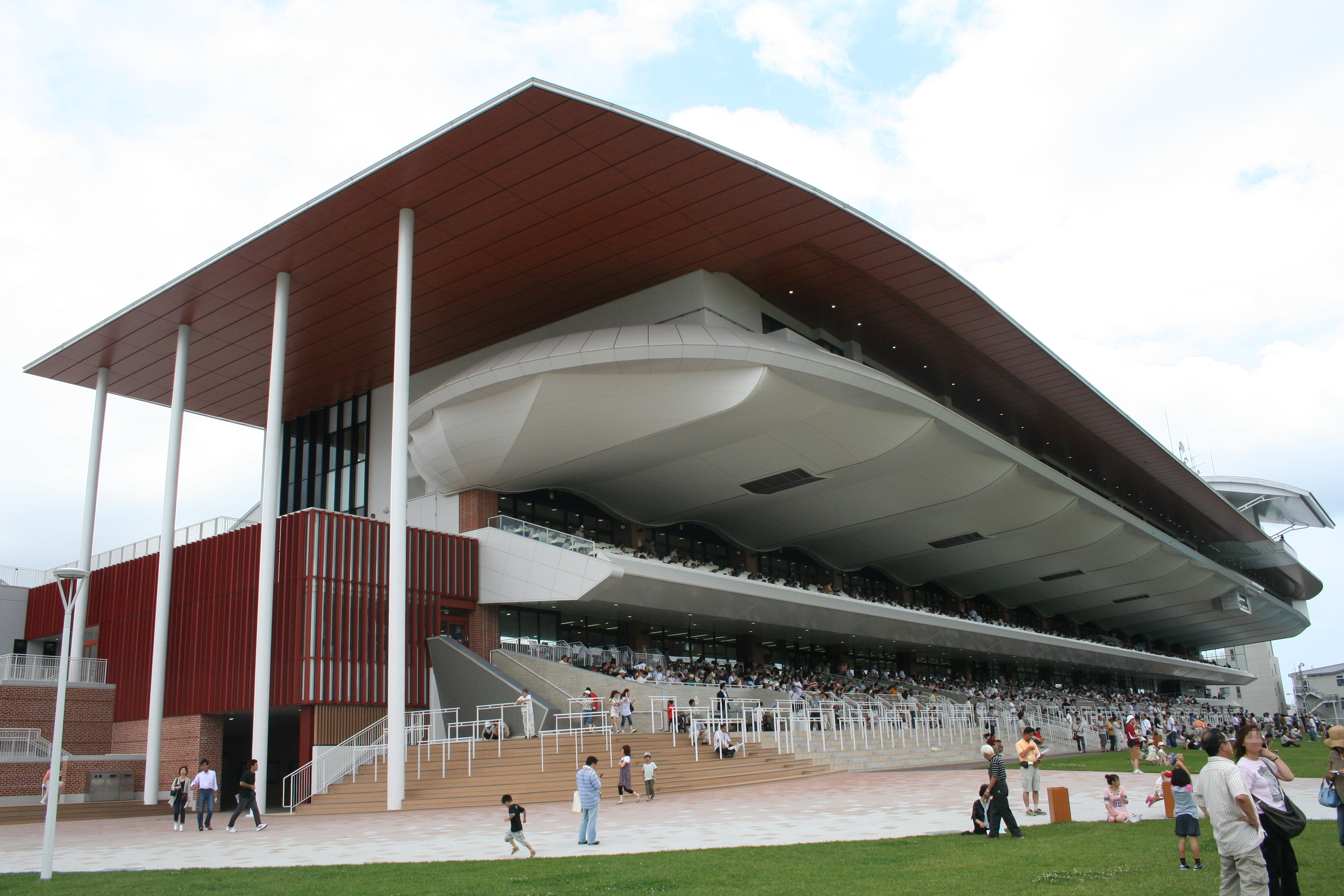
- Hakodate Racecourse
- Class: Grade 3
- Location: Hakodate Racecourse
- Inaugurated: 1965
- Race type: Thoroughbred Flat racing

Race information
- Distance: 2000 metres
- Surface: Turf
- Track: Right-handed
- Qualification: 3-y-o+
- Weight: Handicap
- Purse: ¥ 92,980,000 (as of 2025): 1st: ¥ 43,000,000; 2nd: ¥ 17,000,000; 3rd: ¥ 11,000,000

The Hakodate Kinen (Japanese 函館記念) is a Japanese Grade 3 horse race for Thoroughbreds aged three and over. It is run in July every year over a distance of 2000 metres on turf at Hakodate Racecourse in Hakodate, Japan.

It was first run in 1965 and has held Grade 3 status since 1984. The race was run over 2400 metres until 1967.

== Winners since 1984 ==
| Year | Winner | Age | Jockey | Trainer | Owner | Time |
|---|---|---|---|---|---|---|
| 1984 | Windsor Knot | 4 | Masato Shibata | Kunio Takamatsu | Horseman | 1:59.6 |
| 1985 | Windsor Knot | 5 | Masato Shibata | Kunio Takamatsu | Horseman | 1:59.2 |
| 1986 | Nippo Teio | 3 | Hiroyuki Gohara | Kinzo Kubota | Yuichi Yamaishi | 1:58.6 |
| 1987 | Windstoss | 4 | Kazuhiro Kato | Toshio Nihonyanagi | Tokusuke Fukushima | 2:00.2 |
| 1988 | Soccer Boy | 3 | Hiroshi Kawachi | Yukiharu Ono | Shadai Race Horse | 1:57.8 |
| 1989 | Speak Reason | 3 | Tomio Yasuda | Mitsuhiro Ogata | Mitsuru Takesaki | 2:00.2 |
| 1990 | Lucky Guerlain | 4 | Koichi Uchida | Yasuo Ikee | Royal Farm | 1:59.5 |
| 1991 | Mejiro Marsyas | 6 | Seiki Tabara | Yasuo Ikee | Mejiro Shoji | 1:59.1 |
| 1992 | Higashi Mallorca | 4 | Hitoshi Matoba | Mitsuhiro Ogata | Yanagawa Farm | 2:00.6 |
| 1993 | Golden Eye | 5 | Shinji Fujita | Takashi Tsukazaki | Kenichi Takahashi | 2:04.6 |
| 1994 | Wako Chikako | 4 | Shinji Fujita | Yuji Ito | Takao Ishida | 2:01.6 |
| 1995 | Inter My Way | 5 | Shinji Fujita | Mitsuo Ogino | Tomee Matsuoka | 2:02.4 |
| 1996 | Bright Sunday | 4 | Norihiro Yokoyama | Mitsuo Ogino | Kazuo Nakamura | 1:59.8 |
| 1997 | Aloha Dream | 4 | Kazuhiro Kato | Hirotoshi Iwaki | Keisho Kida | 1:59.3 |
| 1998 | Pal Bright | 6 | Hatsuhiro Kowata | Hirotoshi Iwaki | Iwao Kinami | 2:00.4 |
| 1999 | Jo Big Bang | 4 | Hiromasa Tamogi | Makoto Tsubo | Keiko Ueda | 2:02.0 |
| 2000 | Craftsmanship | 5 | Masaki Katsuura | Yoshiyuki Goto | Sunday Racing | 2:02.7 |
| 2001 | Lord Platinum | 5 | Mikio Matsunaga | Yuji Ito | Lord Horse Club | 2:02.4 |
| 2002 | Yamanin Respect | 5 | Yohsikazu Yokoyama | Hideshi Asami | Kaoru Doi | 2:05.1 |
| 2003 | Air Eminem | 5 | Masayoshi Ebina | Yuji Ito | Lucky Field | 1:59.9 |
| 2004 | Craft Work | 5 | Norihiro Yokoyama | Yoshiyuki Goto | Sunday Racing | 2:00.6 |
| 2005 | Erimo Harrier | 5 | Kohei Kitamura | Hidetaka Tadokoro | Toshiharu Yamamoto | 2:00.7 |
| 2006 | Erimo Harrier | 6 | Katsumi Ando | Hidetaka Tadokoro | Toshiharu Yamamoto | 2:05.1 |
| 2007 | Erimo Harrier | 7 | Koshiro Take | Hidetaka Tadokoro | Toshiharu Yamamoto | 2:02.8 |
| 2008 | Tosen Captain | 4 | Yusuke Fujioka | Katsuhiko Sumii | Takaya Shimakawa | 2:00.3 |
| 2009 | Sakura Orion | 7 | Shinichiro Akiyama | Yasuo Ikee | Sakura Commerce | 2:00.6 |
| 2010 | Meiner Starry | 5 | Douglas Whyte | Tadashi Kayo | Thoroughbred Club Ruffian | 1:58.5 |
| 2011 | King Top Gun | 8 | Norihiro Yokoyama | Ippo Sameshima | Toyoji Ikeda | 2:00.3 |
| 2012 | Transwarp | 7 | Takuya Ono | Kiyoshi Hagiwara | Carrot Farm | 2:00.4 |
| 2013 | Tokei Halo | 4 | Yutaka Take | Hisashi Shimizu | Nobuhiko Kimura | 1:58.6 |
| 2014 | Love Is Boo Shet | 5 | Yoshihiro Furukawa | Akira Murayama | Sachiaki Kobayashi | 2:00.1 |
| 2015 | Derby Fizz | 5 | Yasunari Iwata | Futoshi Kojima | Shadai Race Horse | 1:59.1 |
| 2016 | Meiner Milano | 6 | Yuji Tannai | Ikuo Aizawa | Thoroughbred Club Ruffian | 1:59.0 |
| 2017 | Luminous Warrior | 6 | Yuichi Shibayama | Shoichiro Wada | Sunday Racing | 2:01.2 |
| 2018 | Air Anthem | 7 | Yusuke Fujioka | Keiji Yoshimura | Lucky Field | 1:59.8 |
| 2019 | My Style | 5 | Katsuharu Tanaka | Mitsugu Kon | Chiyono Terada | 1:59.6 |
| 2020 | Admire Justa | 4 | Hayato Yoshida | Naosuke Sugai | Junko Kondo | 1:59.7 |
| 2021 | Tosen Surya | 6 | Kazuo Yokoyama | Jiro Ono | Takaya Shimakawa | 1:58.7 |
| 2022 | Hayayakko | 6 | Suguru Hamanaka | Sakae Kunieda | Kaneko Makoto Holdings | 2:03.6 |
| 2023 | Rousham Park | 4 | Christophe Lemaire | Hiroyasu Tanaka | Sunday Racing | 2:01.4 |
| 2024 | Ho O Biscuits | 4 | Yasunari Iwata | Takeshi Okumura | Yoshihisa Ozasa | 1:59.2 |
| 2025 | Veloce Era | 4 | Daisuke Sasaki | Naosuke Sugai | TO Racing | 1:57.6 (Note: Broke the track record) |
| 2026 | Faust Rasen | 4 | Miku Kobayashi | Naosuke Sugai | Toshiya Miyazaki | 1:57.7 |

== Previous Winner ==
- 1965 - Kuri Bay
- 1966 - Mejiro Bosatsu
- 1967 - Ryuzuki
- 1968 - Ryuzuki
- 1969 - Kuri Kashiwa
- 1970 - Mejiro Asama
- 1971 - Mejiro Musashi
- 1972 - Onward Guy
- 1973 - Erimo Cup
- 1974 - Tsukisamu Homare
- 1975 - Tsukisamu Homare
- 1976 - Erimo George
- 1977 - Yamabuki O
- 1978 - Bambton Court
- 1979 - Emperor Ace
- 1980 - Sir Pen Prince
- 1981 - Howa Sekito
- 1982 - Kazushige
- 1983 - Dokan Yashima

== See also ==
- Horse racing in Japan
- List of Japanese flat horse races
