= Mikki Isle =

Japanese-bred Thoroughbred racehorse

Mikki Isle ミッキーアイル
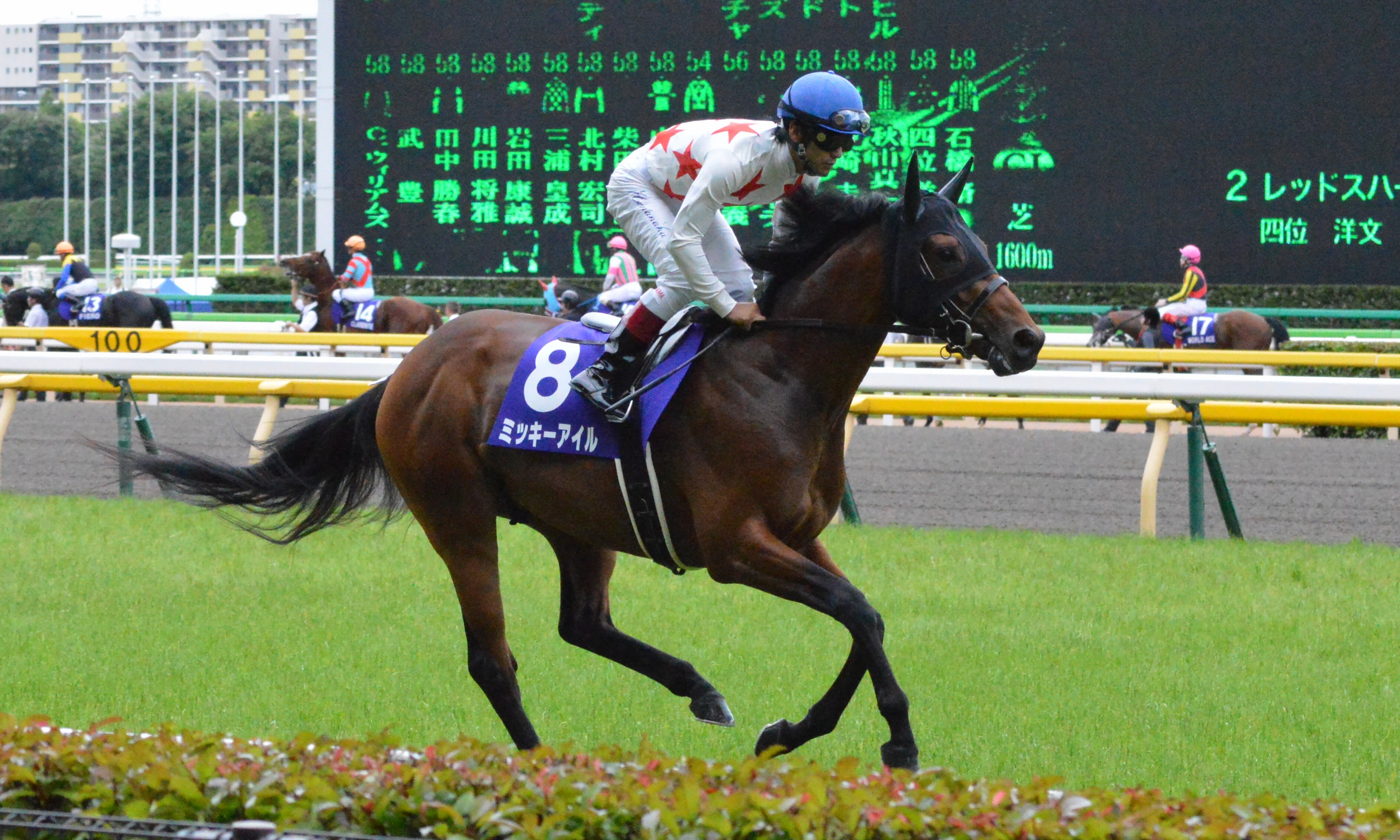
- Mikki Isle in 2014
- Breed: Thoroughbred
- Sire: Deep Impact
- Grandsire: Sunday Silence
- Dam: Star Isle
- Damsire: Rock of Gibraltar
- Sex: Stallion
- Foaled: 12 March 2011
- Country: Japan
- Colour: Bay
- Breeder: Northern Farm
- Owner: Mizuki Noda
- Racing colours
- Trainer: Hidetaka Otonashi
- Jockey: Suguru Hamanaka
- Record: 20: 8-4-1
- Earnings: £2,689,345

Major wins
- Shinzan Kinen (2014); Arlington Cup (2014); NHK Mile Cup (2014); Swan Stakes (2014); Hankyu Hai (2016); Mile Championship (2016)

Awards
- JRA Award for Best Sprinter or Miler (2016)

Mikki Isle (Japanese: ミッキーアイル, Hepburn: Mikkī Airu; foaled 12 March 2011) is a Japanese retired Thoroughbred racehorse and active sire. After winning two of his three starts as a juvenile he emerged as a top-class performer in 2014 when his wins included the Nikkan Sports Sho Shinzan Kinen, Arlington Cup, NHK Mile Cup and Swan Stakes. He failed to win as a four-year-old but ran well in defeat in major races such as the Takamatsunomiya Kinen and the Sprinters Stakes. He reached his peak in 2016 when he won the Hankyu Hai and ran second in both the Takamatsunomiya Kinen and the Sprinters Stakes before recording his biggest win in the Mile Championship. At the end of the year he took the JRA Award for Best Sprinter or Miler. He was a front-running racehorse and was often vulnerable to fast-finishing opponents.

== Background ==
Mikki Isle is a bay horse with no white markings bred in Japan by Northern Farm. In 2012 he was consigned to the Japan Racing Horse Association Sale of Yearlings and Weanlings and was bought for ¥79,800,000 (about $954,000) by Mizuki Noda. The colt was sent into training with Hidetaka Otonashi and was ridden in most of his races by Suguru Hamanaka.

He is from the fourth crop of foals sired by Deep Impact, who was the Japanese Horse of the Year in 2005 and 2006, winning races including the Tokyo Yushun, Tenno Sho, Arima Kinen and Japan Cup. Deep Impact's other progeny include Gentildonna, Harp Star, Kizuna, A Shin Hikari and Makahiki. His dam Star Isle was bred in Ireland but raced in Japan where she won two minor races as a three-year-old in 2007. Her dam, Isle de France was a granddaughter of My Juliet, and was therefore related to Winona, Snaafi Dancer, Lyphard's Special and Old Rosebud.

== Racing career ==
=== 2013: two-year-old season ===
Mikki Isle began his racing career by finishing second to Atom in a race for newcomers over 1600 metres at Hanshin Racecourse on 7 September. On his next appearance the colt won a maiden race at Kyoto Racecourse, completing the 1600 metre course in a record time of 1:32.3. He ended the year at Nakayama Racecourse on 14 December by winning the Hiiragi Sho over the same distance.

=== 2014: three-year-old season ===
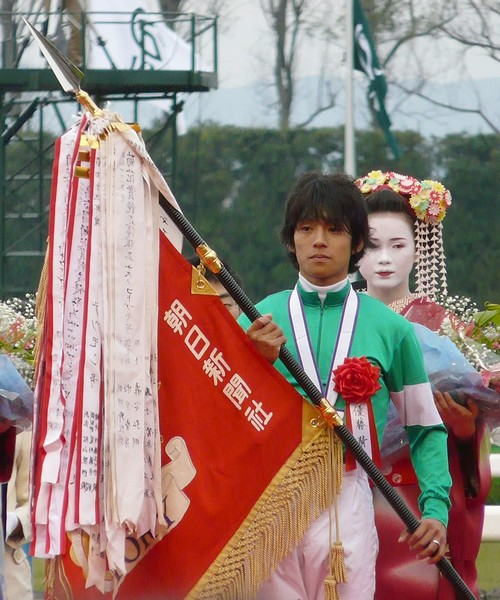
Suguru Hamanaka, who rode Mikki Isle in most of his races

Mikki Isle began his second campaign in the Grade 3 Nikkan Sports Sho Shinzan Kinen at Kyoto on 12 January in which he started the 0.6/1 favourite and won by half a length from Win Full Bloom. On 1 March the colt started odds-on favourite for the Grade 3 Arlington Cup at Hanshin and recorded his fourth consecutive victory as he came home three and a half lengths clear of Tagano Grandpa.

On 11 May the colt was moved up to Grade 1 class and started the 0.9/1 favourite for the NHK Mile Cup at Tokyo Racecourse with his seventeen opponents included Atom, Rosa Gigantea (Spring Stakes) and Shonan Archive (Grade 2 New Zealand Trophy). He took the lead soon after the start, repelled the sustained challenge of Horai Akiko and held off a wave of late challengers in the closing stages to win by a neck from Tagano Burg. After the race Suguru Hamanaka said "being sent off as heavy favorite, I'm relieved with the outcome. Unusually, he was tense in the gate and didn't break as well, but once he spurted for the lead he was faster than the others. I knew the others were closing in fast, and prayed that he would hold on to his lead. This horse has incredible speed and character. I hope he will go on to enjoy a fantastic career". On 8 June, over the same course and distance, Mikki Isle was matched against older horses in the Yasuda Kinen. Racing on soft ground he led for most of the way but tired badly in the straight and came home sixteenth of the eighteen runners behind Just A Way, beaten twelve lengths by the winner.

After a lengthy summer break Mikki Isle returned for the Grade 2 Swan Stakes over 1400 metres at Kyoto in which he again faced older rivals. Starting the 1.5/1 favourite he won by half a length and a nose from the five-year-olds Sunrise Major and Fiero. Three weeks later the colt started favourite for the Mile Championship at the same track but after taking the lead in the straight he faded rapidly and was eased down by Hamanaka and finished unplaced behind Danon Shark. The colt was the beaten favourite again on his final start of the year, coming home seventh to Real Impact in the Grade 2 Hanshin Cup on 27 December.

In the JRA Awards for 2014, Mikki Isle placed fourth behind Snow Dragon in the poll for Best Sprinter or Miler receiving 12 of the 285 votes.

=== 2015: four-year-old season ===
On his 2015 debut Mikki Isle was beaten a nose by the six-year-old Daiwa Maggiore, to whom he was conceding five pounds in weight, in the Grade 3 Hankyu Hai over 1400 metres on heavy ground at Hanshin on 1 March. At the end of the month the colt was dropped back in trip for the Grade 1 Takamatsunomiya Kinen over 1200 metres at Chukyo Racecourse in which he produced a strong late run down the centre of the track but was beaten half a length and a nose behind the Hong Kong challenger Aerovelocity and Hakusan Moon. In his second attempt to win the Yasuda Kinen on 7 June Mikki Isle came home fifteenth of the seventeen runners behind Maurice.

Mikki Isle returned in autumn for the Sprinters Stakes over 1200 metres at Nakayama on 4 October. After tracking the leaders he went to the front 100 metres from the line but was overwhelmed by fast finishers in the final strides and was beaten into fourth place behind Straight Girl, Sakura Gospel and Ukiyono Kaze. For his final run of the year the colt was sent to Sha Tin Racecourse for the Hong Kong Sprint in which he finished seventh to the locally trained Peniaphobia after fading in the straight.

=== 2016: five-year-old season ===
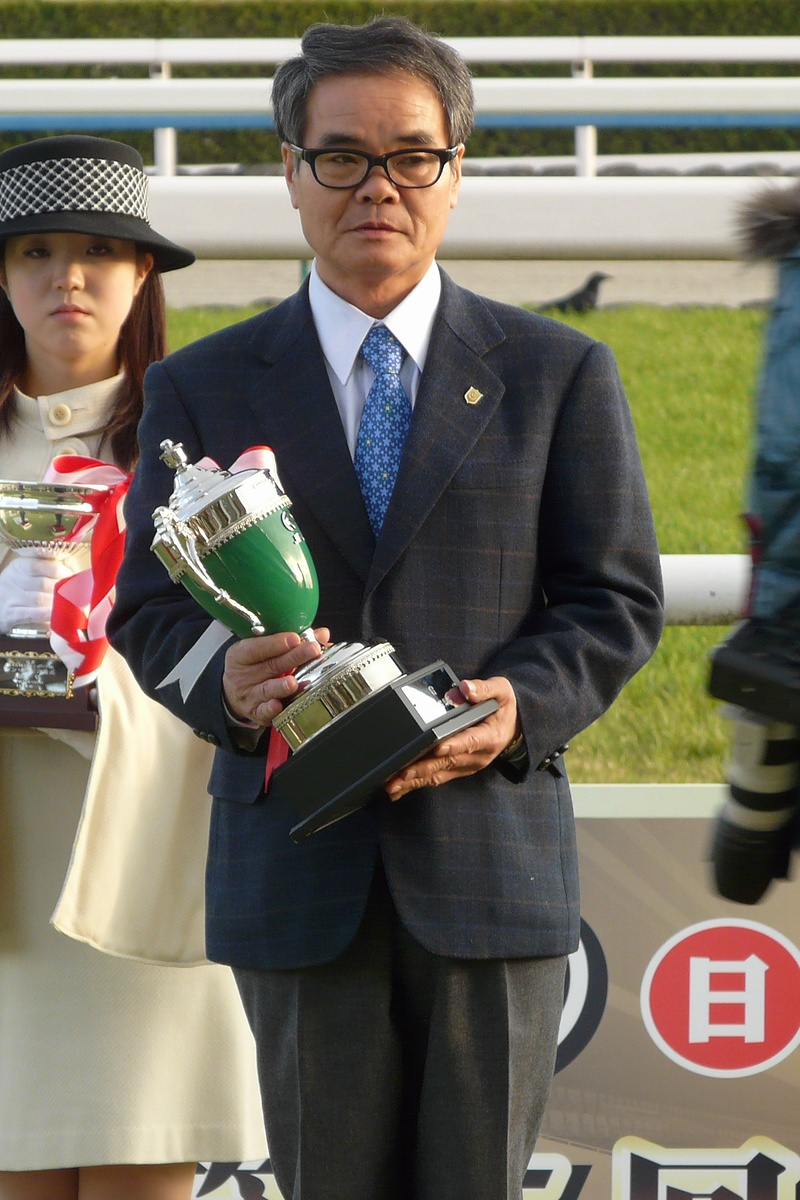
Mikki Isle's trainer Hidetaka Otonashi

Kohei Matsuyama took over the ride from Hamanaka for Mikki Isle's first three races of 2016. The horse made his seasonal debut in the Hankyu Hai on 28 February and recorded his first victory for fifteen months as he won by three quarters of a length from the gelding Omega Vendetta. Mikki Isle's second bid for the Takamatsunomiya Kinen saw him start second choice in the betting behind Big Arthur on 27 March. After racing just behind the leaders he took the lead in the straight but was overtaken by Big Arthur in the last 100 metres and finished second by three quarter of a lengths.

After a break of more than six months, Mikki Isle returned to action for a second tilt at the Sprinters Stakes on 2 October. He took the lead soon after the start, maintained his advantage into the straight and looked likely to win before being caught on the line and beaten a head by Red Falx. Hamanaka was reunited with Mikki Isle for the Mile Championship at Kyoto on 20 November. The horse was made the 4.9/1 third choice in the betting behind Satono Aladdin (Swan Stakes) and Isla Bonita (Satsuki Sho) in an eighteen-runner field which also included Neorealism, Snow Dragon, Danon Shark, Young Man Power (Fuji Stakes), Fiero and Sunrise Major. Mikki Isle led from the start, fought off a sustained challenge from Neorealism and prevailed by a head from Isla Bonita despite hanging left in the closing stages. The racecourse stewards held an inquiry into the interference caused by the winner's failure to keep to a straight course but left the result unaltered. Hamanaka reported "I apologize for interfering with other horses in the stretch. Mikki Isle ran really well and I was able to race him in the front as planned. The horse was in good form and performed his best in the race".

On his final racecourse appearance, Mikki Isle started favourite for the Hanshin Cup on 24 December but came home sixth of the fifteen runners behind the three-year-old Shuji.

In the JRA Awards for 2014, Mikki Isle was named Best Sprinter or Miler receiving 169 of the 291 votes to take the award ahead of Maurice (52 votes), Big Arthur (29) and Red Falx (23).

In the 2016 World's Best Racehorse Rankings Mikki Isle was given a rating of 118, making him the 74th best racehorse in the world.

== Racing form ==
Mikki Isle won eight and snatched five podiums out of 20 starts. This data is available based on JBIS, netkeiba and HKJC.

Date	Track	Race	Grade	Distance (Condition)	Entry	HN	Odds (Favored)	Finish	Time	Margins	Jockey	Winner (Runner-up)
2013 – two-year-old season
Sep 7	Hanshin	2yo Newcomer		1,600 m (Firm)	13	12	3.5 (2)	2nd	1:37.6	0.1	Suguru Hamanaka	Atom
Nov 2	Kyoto	2yo Maiden		1,600 m (Firm)	14	3	1.2 (1)	1st	R1:32.3	–0.8	Suguru Hamanaka	(Air Camuzet)
Dec 14	Nakayama	Hiiragi Sho	ALW (1W)	1,600 m (Firm)	15	2	1.3 (1)	1st	1:34.2	–0.6	Ryan Moore	(Peak Tram)
2014 – three-year-old season
Jan 12	Kyoto	Shinzan Kinen	3	1,600 m (Firm)	13	12	1.6 (1)	1st	1:33.8	–0.1	Suguru Hamanaka	(Win Full Bloom)
Mar 1	Hanshin	Arlington Cup	3	1,600 m (Firm)	10	10	1.4 (1)	1st	1:34.0	–0.6	Suguru Hamanaka	(Tagano Grandpa)
May 11	Tokyo	NHK Mile Cup	1	1,600 m (Firm)	18	10	1.9 (1)	1st	1:33.2	0.0	Suguru Hamanaka	(Tagano Burg)
Jun 8	Tokyo	Yasuda Kinen	1	1,600 m (Heavy)	17	8	7.4 (2)	16th	1:38.8	2.0	Suguru Hamanaka	Just A Way
Nov 1	Kyoto	Swan Stakes	2	1,400 m (Firm)	13	11	2.5 (1)	1st	1:20.3	–0.1	Suguru Hamanaka	(Sunrise Major)
Nov 23	Kyoto	Mile Championship	1	1,600 m (Firm)	17	15	4.4 (1)	13th	1:32.8	1.3	Suguru Hamanaka	Danon Shark
Dec 27	Hanshin	Hanshin Cup	1	1,400 m (Firm)	18	6	3.7 (1)	7th	1:21.1	0.4	Suguru Hamanaka	Real Impact
2015 – four-year-old season
Mar 1	Hanshin	Hankyu Hai	3	1,400 m (Heavy)	16	5	7.9 (4)	2nd	1:23.8	0.0	Suguru Hamanaka	Daiwa Maggiore
Mar 29	Chukyo	Takamatsunomiya Kinen	1	1,200 m (Good)	18	16	5.2 (3)	3rd	1:08.6	0.1	Suguru Hamanaka	Aerovelocity
Jun 7	Tokyo	Yasuda Kinen	1	1,600 m (Firm)	17	5	8.1 (4)	15th	1:33.0	1.0	Suguru Hamanaka	Maurice
Oct 4	Nakayama	Sprinters Stakes	1	1,200 m (Firm)	15	13	6.5 (4)	4th	1:08.3	0.2	Suguru Hamanaka	Straight Girl
Dec 13	Sha Tin	Hong Kong Sprint	1	1,200 m (Good)	14	5	29.0 (7)	7th	1:09.6	0.9	Suguru Hamanaka	Peniaphobia
2016 – five-year-old season
Feb 28	Hanshin	Hankyu Hai	3	1,400 m (Firm)	18	13	3.8 (1)	1st	1:19.9	–0.1	Kohei Matsuyama	(Omega Vendetta)
Mar 27	Chukyo	Takamatsunomiya Kinen	1	1,200 m (Firm)	18	6	3.9 (2)	2nd	1:06.8	0.1	Kohei Matsuyama	Big Arthur
Oct 2	Nakayama	Sprinters Stakes	1	1,200 m (Firm)	16	15	8.2 (2)	2nd	1:07.6	0.0	Kohei Matsuyama	Red Falx
Nov 20	Kyoto	Mile Championship	1	1,600 m (Firm)	18	16	5.9 (3)	1st	1:33.1	0.0	Suguru Hamanaka	(Isla Bonita)
Dec 24	Hanshin	Hanshin Cup	2	1,400 m (Good)	15	8	2.1 (1)	6th	1:22.2	0.3	Suguru Hamanaka	Shuji

Legend:
Turf

- R indicated that it was a record time finish

== Stud career ==
Mikki Isle was retired from racing to become a breeding stallion at the Shadai Stallion Station in Japan. He has also been shuttled to stand at the Arrowfield Stud in New South Wales.

=== Notable progeny ===
Below data is based on JBIS Stallion Reports.

c = colt, f = filly

Foaled	Name	Sex	Major Wins
2018	Dualist	c	Hyogo Junior Grand Prix
2018	La La Christine	f	Kyoto Himba Stakes
2018	Meikei Yell	f	Kokura Nisai Stakes, Fantasy Stakes, Tulip Sho, Silk Road Stakes, Keio Hai Spring Cup, Centaur Stakes
2018	William Barows	c	Nippon TV Hai, Tokai Stakes
2019	Namura Clair	f	Kokura Nisai Stakes, Hakodate Sprint Stakes, Silk Road Stakes, Keeneland Cup, Hanshin Cup
2022	Sound Moryana	f	Keeneland Cup

== Pedigree ==
Pedigree of Mikki Isle (JPN), bay stallion 2011
Sire Deep Impact (JPN) 2002	Sunday Silence (USA); 1986	Halo	Hail to Reason
Sire Deep Impact (JPN) 2002	Sunday Silence (USA); 1986	Halo	Cosmah
Sire Deep Impact (JPN) 2002	Sunday Silence (USA); 1986	Wishing Well	Understanding
Sire Deep Impact (JPN) 2002	Sunday Silence (USA); 1986	Wishing Well	Mountain Flower
Sire Deep Impact (JPN) 2002	Wind in Her Hair (IRE); 1991	Alzao (USA)	Lyphard
Sire Deep Impact (JPN) 2002	Wind in Her Hair (IRE); 1991	Alzao (USA)	Lady Rebecca (GB)
Sire Deep Impact (JPN) 2002	Wind in Her Hair (IRE); 1991	Burghclere (GB)	Busted
Sire Deep Impact (JPN) 2002	Wind in Her Hair (IRE); 1991	Burghclere (GB)	Highclere
Dam Star Isle (IRE) 2004	Rock of Gibraltar; 1998	Danehill (USA)	Danzig
Dam Star Isle (IRE) 2004	Rock of Gibraltar; 1998	Danehill (USA)	Razyana
Dam Star Isle (IRE) 2004	Rock of Gibraltar; 1998	Offshore Boom	Be My Guest (USA)
Dam Star Isle (IRE) 2004	Rock of Gibraltar; 1998	Offshore Boom	Push A Button
Dam Star Isle (IRE) 2004	Isle de France (USA); 1995	Nureyev	Northern Dancer (CAN)
Dam Star Isle (IRE) 2004	Isle de France (USA); 1995	Nureyev	Special
Dam Star Isle (IRE) 2004	Isle de France (USA); 1995	Stella Madrid	Alydar
Dam Star Isle (IRE) 2004	Isle de France (USA); 1995	Stella Madrid	My Juliet (Family: 6-a)
