= Mama Cocha (horse) =

Japanese Thoroughbred racehorse (foaled 2019)

Mama Cocha ママコチャ
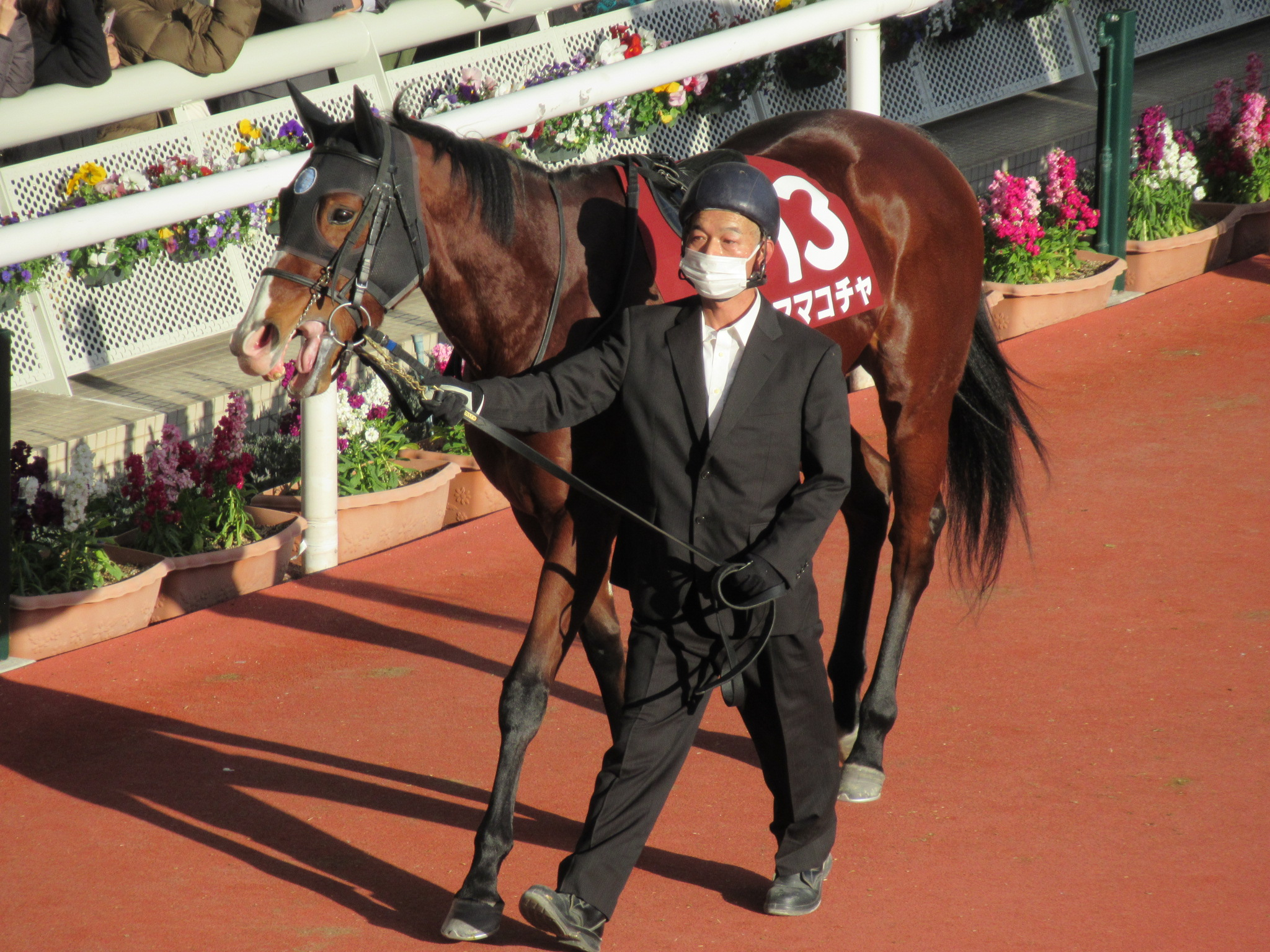
- Mama Cocha in December 2023
- Breed: Thoroughbred
- Sire: Kurofune
- Grandsire: French Deputy
- Dam: Buchiko
- Damsire: King Kamehameha
- Sex: Mare
- Foaled: 5 April 2019
- Country: Japan
- Colour: Bay
- Breeder: Northern Farm
- Owner: Kaneko Makoto Holdings
- Racing colours
- Trainer: Yasutoshi Ikee
- Jockey: Yuga Kawada; Kohei Matsuyama; Yusuke Fujioka
- Record: 30: 7-6-4 (27 JRA: 7-5-4; 3 NAR: 0-1-0)
- Earnings: ¥539,023,000

Major wins
- Sprinters Stakes (2023); Ocean Stakes (2025)

Awards
- JRA Award for Best Sprinter (2023)

Mama Cocha (Japanese: ママコチャ, Hepburn: Mama Kocha; foaled 5 April 2019) is a retired Japanese Thoroughbred racehorse and active broodmare. She was active from 2021 to 2026, recording seven wins in thirty starts, including the Sprinters Stakes (GI) in 2023 and the Ocean Stakes (GIII) in 2025. She was named the inaugural recipient of the JRA Award for Best Sprinter in 2023. She is the full sister of Sodashi, winner of the 2021 Oka Shō and 2022 Victoria Mile.

== Background ==
Mama Cocha is a bay mare bred in Abira, Hokkaido, by Northern Farm. She was sired by Kurofune, and her dam was Buchiko, a white-coated mare by King Kamehameha out of Shirayukihime. Her full sister Sodashi (by Kurofune, out of Buchiko) won the 2020 Hanshin Juvenile Fillies, 2021 Oka Shō, and 2022 Victoria Mile. Her racing name is derived from Mama Cocha, the sea goddess in Inca mythology. She was owned by Kaneko Makoto Holdings and sent into training with Yasutoshi Ikee at the JRA's Ritto Training Center.

== Racing career ==
=== 2021: two-year-old season ===
Mama Cocha debuted on June 26, 2021, in a maiden race on the turf at Hanshin Racecourse, finishing eighth. She finished third in a maiden race at Chukyo Racecourse in September and won a maiden race at Hanshin on October 24. She finished third in the Fantasy Stakes (GIII) at Hanshin in November.

=== 2022: three-year-old season ===
Mama Cocha finished second in the Elfin Stakes (Listed) at Chukyo in February. She won a 1-win-class race at Hanshin in June, the Hoei Tokubetsu (Allowance) at Niigata Racecourse in July, and the Nayabashi Stakes (Allowance) at Chukyo in September. She finished fifth in the Turquoise Stakes (GIII) at Nakayama Racecourse in December.

=== 2023: four-year-old season ===
Mama Cocha finished ninth in the Hanshin Himba Stakes (GII) in April. She won the Azuchijo Stakes (Listed) at Kyoto Racecourse on May 28, equaling the track record for 1400 meters. She finished second in the Kitakyushu Kinen (GIII) at Kokura Racecourse in August.

On October 1, she contested the Sprinters Stakes (GI) at Nakayama. Ridden by Yuga Kawada, she tracked the leaders in third position and won by a nose over Mad Cool, recording her first Grade 1 victory. She finished fifth in the Hanshin Cup (GII) in December.

=== 2024: five-year-old season ===
On January 9, 2024, Mama Cocha was named the inaugural recipient of the JRA Award for Best Sprinter, a newly created category split from the former JRA Award for Best Sprinter or Miler. She finished eighth in the Takamatsunomiya Kinen (GI) at Chukyo in March. She finished second in the Centaur Stakes (GII) at Chukyo in September and fourth in the Sprinters Stakes (GI) at Nakayama. She and her groom Isao Saito received the Best Turned Out Award at the Sprinters Stakes. She finished fifth in the Hanshin Cup (GII) in December.

=== 2025: six-year-old season ===
On March 1, Mama Cocha won the Ocean Stakes (GIII) at Nakayama, equaling the race record of 1:07.1. She finished third in the Takamatsunomiya Kinen (GI) at Chukyo on March 30. She finished second in the Keio Hai Spring Cup (GII) at Tokyo Racecourse in May and second in the Centaur Stakes (GII) at Hanshin in September. She finished sixth in the Sprinters Stakes (GI) at Nakayama in September. She finished second in the JBC Sprint (JpnI) on the dirt at Funabashi Racecourse in November.

=== 2026: seven-year-old season ===
Mama Cocha finished fourth in the Ocean Stakes (GIII) at Nakayama in February and ninth in the Takamatsunomiya Kinen (GI) at Chukyo in March. She finished fifth in the Tokyo Sprint (JpnIII) at Oi Racecourse in April and fifth in the Sakitama Hai (JpnI) at Urawa Racecourse in June. She was rested and competed in the Centaur Stakes in September where she finished third. This was her first podium of the year, and her jockey, Yutaka Take, said she can still run even at her ripe age of seven. Her next encounter in her fourth Sprinters Stakes appearance did not go well as she sat around seventh place and tried to run on the outside but lacked finishing kick for the day as she finished in tenth on the line. Take said the horse went with the flow but that was the fastest she could run for today. After her 30th start, she was retired from racing and became a broodmare. Her trainer, Yasutoshi Ikee, hoped that her future children would do well just like their dam did.

== Statistics ==
The following table details all 30 starts of Mama Cocha's racing career based on official netkeiba and JBIS records. Record current as of 27 September 2026.

Date	Distance (Condition)	Race	Class	Course	Odds (Favourite)	Field	Finish	Time	Jockey	Winning (Losing) Margin	Winner (2nd Place)	Ref
2021 – two-year-old season
Jun 26	Turf 1400 m (Firm)	2-Y-O Newcomer	Maiden	Hanshin	4.0 (2nd)	17	8th	1:24.8	Yuichi Fukunaga	0.6	Tagano Finale	
Sep 18	Turf 1600 m (Heavy)	2-Y-O Maiden	Maiden	Chukyo	4.1 (2nd)	13	3rd	1:36.9	Mirai Iwata	0.1	Pink McFee	
Oct 24	Turf 1400 m (Firm)	2-Y-O Maiden	Maiden	Hanshin	4.1 (1st)	16	1st	1:20.9	Kohei Matsuyama	–0.4	(Jean Gros)	
Nov 6	Turf 1400 m (Firm)	Fantasy Stakes	GIII	Hanshin	4.4 (3rd)	10	3rd	1:21.5	Yusuke Fujioka	0.4	Water Navillera	
2022 – three-year-old season
Feb 5	Turf 1600 m (Firm)	Elfin Stakes	Listed	Chukyo	4.5 (3rd)	10	2nd	1:34.2	Mirai Iwata	0.2	Alluring Way	
Jun 19	Turf 1400 m (Firm)	3-Y-O 1-Win Class	Allowance	Hanshin	1.3 (1st)	13	1st	1:20.3	Kohei Matsuyama	–0.1	(Eishin Pixel)	
Jul 30	Turf 1600 m (Firm)	Hoei Tokubetsu	Allowance	Niigata	2.6 (1st)	18	1st	1:31.7	Kohei Matsuyama	–0.6	(Vamos Road)	
Sep 18	Turf 1600 m (Firm)	Nayabashi Stakes	Allowance	Chukyo	1.3 (1st)	13	1st	1:33.4	Kohei Matsuyama	–0.1	(Wilhelm)	
Dec 17	Turf 1600 m (Firm)	Turquoise Stakes	GIII	Nakayama	3.2 (1st)	16	5th	1:33.7	Kohei Matsuyama	0.2	Miss New York	
2023 – four-year-old season
Apr 8	Turf 1600 m (Good)	Hanshin Himba Stakes	GII	Hanshin	5.0 (3rd)	12	9th	1:34.6	Kohei Matsuyama	0.7	Sound Vivace	
May 28	Turf 1400 m (Firm)	Azuchijo Stakes	Listed	Kyoto	3.1 (1st)	18	1st	1:19.0	Katsuma Sameshima	–0.5	(Be Astonished)	
Aug 20	Turf 1200 m (Firm)	Kitakyushu Kinen	GIII	Kokura	3.0 (1st)	18	2nd	1:07.4	Katsuma Sameshima	0.1	Jasper Krone	
Oct 1	Turf 1200 m (Firm)	Sprinters Stakes	GI	Nakayama	4.9 (3rd)	16	1st	1:08.0	Yuga Kawada	0.0	(Mad Cool)	
Dec 23	Turf 1400 m (Firm)	Hanshin Cup	GII	Hanshin	3.1 (1st)	17	5th	1:19.5	Yuga Kawada	0.2	Win Marvel	
2024 – five-year-old season
Mar 24	Turf 1200 m (Soft)	Takamatsunomiya Kinen	GI	Chukyo	8.0 (3rd)	18	8th	1:09.9	Yuga Kawada	1.0	Mad Cool	
Sep 8	Turf 1200 m (Firm)	Centaur Stakes	GII	Chukyo	8.0 (4th)	18	2nd	1:07.8	Katsuma Sameshima	0.1	Toshin Macao	
Sep 29	Turf 1200 m (Firm)	Sprinters Stakes	GI	Nakayama	5.2 (2nd)	16	4th	1:07.1	Yuga Kawada	0.1	Lugal	
Dec 21	Turf 1400 m (Firm)	Hanshin Cup	GII	Kyoto	7.0 (4th)	18	5th	1:20.3	Yuga Kawada	0.2	Namura Clair	
2025 – six-year-old season
Mar 1	Turf 1200 m (Firm)	Ocean Stakes	GIII	Nakayama	2.7 (1st)	15	1st	1:07.1	Yuga Kawada	–0.1	(Pair Pollux)	
Mar 30	Turf 1200 m (Firm)	Takamatsunomiya Kinen	GI	Chukyo	14.6 (6th)	18	3rd	1:08.2	Yuga Kawada	0.3	Satono Reve	
May 3	Turf 1400 m (Firm)	Keio Hai Spring Cup	GII	Tokyo	2.9 (1st)	12	2nd	1:18.5	Yuga Kawada	0.2	Toshin Macao	
Sep 7	Turf 1200 m (Firm)	Centaur Stakes	GII	Hanshin	3.2 (2nd)	16	2nd	1:07.5	Mirai Iwata	0.1	Kanchenjunga	
Sep 28	Turf 1200 m (Firm)	Sprinters Stakes	GI	Nakayama	8.0 (3rd)	16	6th	1:07.3	Mirai Iwata	0.4	Win Carnelian	
Nov 3	Dirt 1000 m (Good)	JBC Sprint	JpnI	Funabashi	3.8 (1st)	14	2nd	0:59.0	Yuga Kawada	0.2	Fern Hill	
2026 – seven-year-old season
Feb 28	Turf 1200 m (Firm)	Ocean Stakes	GIII	Nakayama	5.6 (3rd)	16	4th	1:07.1	Yuga Kawada	0.1	Pair Pollux	
Mar 29	Turf 1200 m (Firm)	Takamatsunomiya Kinen	GI	Chukyo	8.6 (4th)	18	9th	1:07.3	Yuga Kawada	1.0	Satono Reve	
Apr 15	Dirt 1200 m (Firm)	Tokyo Sprint	JpnIII	Oi	4.2 (3rd)	14	5th	1:11.5	Yuga Kawada	0.8	Dragon Wells	
Jun 24	Dirt 1400 m (Good)	Sakitama Hai	JpnI	Urawa	8.8 (4th)	12	5th	1:25.9	Yutaka Take	0.6	Lord Fons	
Sep 6	Turf 1200 m (Firm)	Centaur Stakes	GII	Hanshin	10.8 (5th)	16	3rd	1:07.2	Yutaka Take	0.3	Flicker Jab	
Sep 27	Turf 1200 m (Good)	Sprinters Stakes	GI	Nakayama	16.1 (7th)	16	10th	1:09.7	Yutaka Take	0.5	Puro Magic	

== Pedigree ==
Pedigree of Mama Cocha (JPN)
Sire Kurofune (USA) 1998	French Deputy (USA); 1992	Deputy Minister	Vice Regent
Sire Kurofune (USA) 1998	French Deputy (USA); 1992	Deputy Minister	Mint Copy
Sire Kurofune (USA) 1998	French Deputy (USA); 1992	Mitterand	Hold Your Peace
Sire Kurofune (USA) 1998	French Deputy (USA); 1992	Mitterand	Laredo Lass
Sire Kurofune (USA) 1998	Blue Avenue (USA); 1990	Classic Go Go	Pago Pago
Sire Kurofune (USA) 1998	Blue Avenue (USA); 1990	Classic Go Go	Classic Perfection
Sire Kurofune (USA) 1998	Blue Avenue (USA); 1990	Eliza Blue	Icecapade
Sire Kurofune (USA) 1998	Blue Avenue (USA); 1990	Eliza Blue	Cholera
Dam Buchiko (JPN) 2012	King Kamehameha (JPN); 2001	Kingmambo	Mr. Prospector
Dam Buchiko (JPN) 2012	King Kamehameha (JPN); 2001	Kingmambo	Miesque
Dam Buchiko (JPN) 2012	King Kamehameha (JPN); 2001	Manfath	Last Tycoon
Dam Buchiko (JPN) 2012	King Kamehameha (JPN); 2001	Manfath	Pilot Bird
Dam Buchiko (JPN) 2012	Shirayukihime (JPN); 1996	Sunday Silence	Halo
Dam Buchiko (JPN) 2012	Shirayukihime (JPN); 1996	Sunday Silence	Wishing Well
Dam Buchiko (JPN) 2012	Shirayukihime (JPN); 1996	Wave Wind	Topsider
Dam Buchiko (JPN) 2012	Shirayukihime (JPN); 1996	Wave Wind	Storm and Sunshine

- Mama Cocha is inbred 5 × 5 to Northern Dancer.
- Her full sister Sodashi (by Kurofune) won the 2020 Hanshin Juvenile Fillies (GI), 2021 Oka Shō (GI), and 2022 Victoria Mile (GI).
- Her dam Buchiko is a white-coated mare. Her granddam Shirayukihime is the founder of the W14 white coat lineage in Japan.

== See also ==
- Thoroughbred racing in Japan
- Sprinters Stakes
- Sodashi
