= Fantasy Stakes (Japan) =

Fantasy Stakes ファンタジーステークス
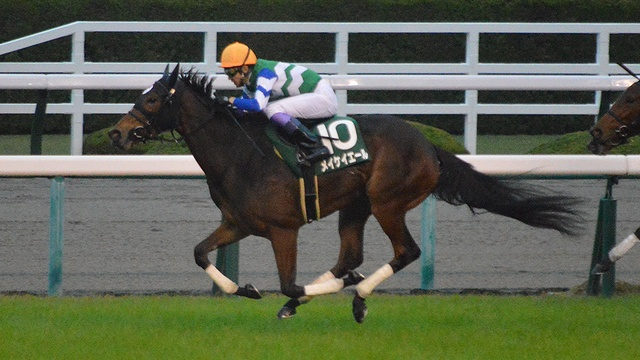
- 2020 Fantasy Stakes winner Meikei Yell
- Class: Grade 3
- Location: Kyoto Racecourse
- Inaugurated: 1996
- Race type: Thoroughbred Flat racing

Race information
- Distance: 1400 metres
- Surface: Turf
- Track: Right-handed
- Qualification: 2-y-o f
- Weight: 55 kg
- Purse: ¥ 62,840,000 (as of 2025): 1st: ¥ 29,000,000; 2nd: ¥ 12,000,000; 3rd: ¥ 7,000,000

The Fantasy Stakes (Japanese ファンタジーステークス) is a Japanese Grade 3 horse race for two-year-old Thoroughbred fillies run in November over a distance of 1400 metres at Kyoto Racecourse.

The race was first run in 1996 and has held Grade 3 status ever since.

== Past Winners ==
Year	Winner	Jockey	Trainer	Owner	Time
1996	She's Princess	Hirofumi Shii	Shuji Ito	Takashi Saito	1:21.2
1997	London Bridge	Mikio Matsunaga	Kenta Nakao	Shimokobe Farm	1:21.2
1998	Primo Ordine	Yuichi Fukunaga	Toyoji Nishihashi	Hidekazu Date	1:21.7
1999	Tennessee Girl	Kazuhiro Yamada	Masanao Tsubo	Toyomitsu Hirai	1:22.1
2000	Tashiro Spring	Kenichi Ikezoe	Akio Tsurudome	Nisshin Bokujo	1:21.3
2001	Kitasan Hibotan	Naosuke Sugai	Hikozo Sugai	Ono Shoji	1:22.6
2002	Peace of World	Yuichi Fukunaga	Masahiro Sakaguchi	Masashi Iida	1:22.2
2003	Sweep Tosho	Koichi Tsunoda	Sakae Watanabe	Tosho Sangyo	1:22.6
2004	Rhein Kraft	Yuichi Fukunaga	Tsutomu Setoguchi	Shigemasa Osawa	1:21.6
2005	Alluring Voice	Yutaka Take	Akihiko Nomura	Sunday Racing	1:21.4
2006	Aston Machan	Yutaka Take	Sei Ishizaka	Mayumi Tosa	1:20.3
2007	Odile	Katsumi Ando	Kojiro Hashiguchi	North Hills Management	1:21.1
2008	Inazuma Amaryllis	Kenichi Ikezoe	Shigeki Matsumoto	Kengo Koizumi	1:23.7
2009	Tagano Elizabeth	Yuga Kawada	Hiroyoshi Matsuda	Ryoji Yagi	1:21.2
2010	Marumo Sarah	Ken Tanaka	Kazuyoshi Kihara	Marumo Kumiai	1:22.3
2011	I'm Yours	Ioritz Mendizabal	Takahisa Tazuka	Your Story	1:21.3
2012	Sound Rihanna	Mirco Demuro	Masao Sato	Yuichi Masuda	1:20.8
2013	Bel Canto	Yutaka Take	Koichi Tsunoda	North Hills	1:21.1
2014	Cool Hotarubi	Futoshi Komaki	Hisashi Shimizu	Tetsuji Kawakami	1:21.7
2015	Candy Barows	Christophe Lemaire	Yoshito Yahagi	Koji Inokuma	1:21.9
2016	Mi Suerte	Yuga Kawada	Yasutoshi Ikee	Sunday Racing	1:21.8
2017	Beluga	Cristian Demuro	Mitsumasa Nakauchida	Robert Anderson	1:22.9
2018	Danon Fantasy	Yuga Kawada	Mitsumasa Nakauchida	Danox	1:21.8
2019	Resistencia	Yuichi Kitamura	Takeshi Matsushita	Carrot Farm	1:20.7
2020	Meikei Yell^{[a]}	Yutaka Take	Hidenori Take	Nagoya Keiba	1:20.1
2021	Water Navillera^{[a]}	Yutaka Take	Koshiro Take	Masato Yamaoka	1:21.1
2022	Rivara^{[a]}	Shu Ishibashi	Mizuki Takayanagi	Yasuki Arai	1:21.3
2023	Culture Day	Manabu Sakai	Hirofumi Shii	MMS Holdings	1:20.4
2024	Dantsu Elan	Taisei Danno	Masaru Honda	Tetsuji Yamamoto	1:22.8
2025	Festival Hill	Cristian Demuro	Hirofumi Shii	Katsumi Yoshida	1:20.9
2026	Nix Luna	Mirai Iwata	Daisuke Takayanagi	Minoru Hashimoto	1:21.3

^{a} The 2020, 2021, and 2022 editions were contested at Hanshin Racecourse, due to renovations held at the Kyoto Racecourse.

== See also ==
- Horse racing in Japan
- List of Japanese flat horse races
