= Danon Platina =

Japanese-bred Thoroughbred racehorse

Danon Platina; ダノンプラチナ
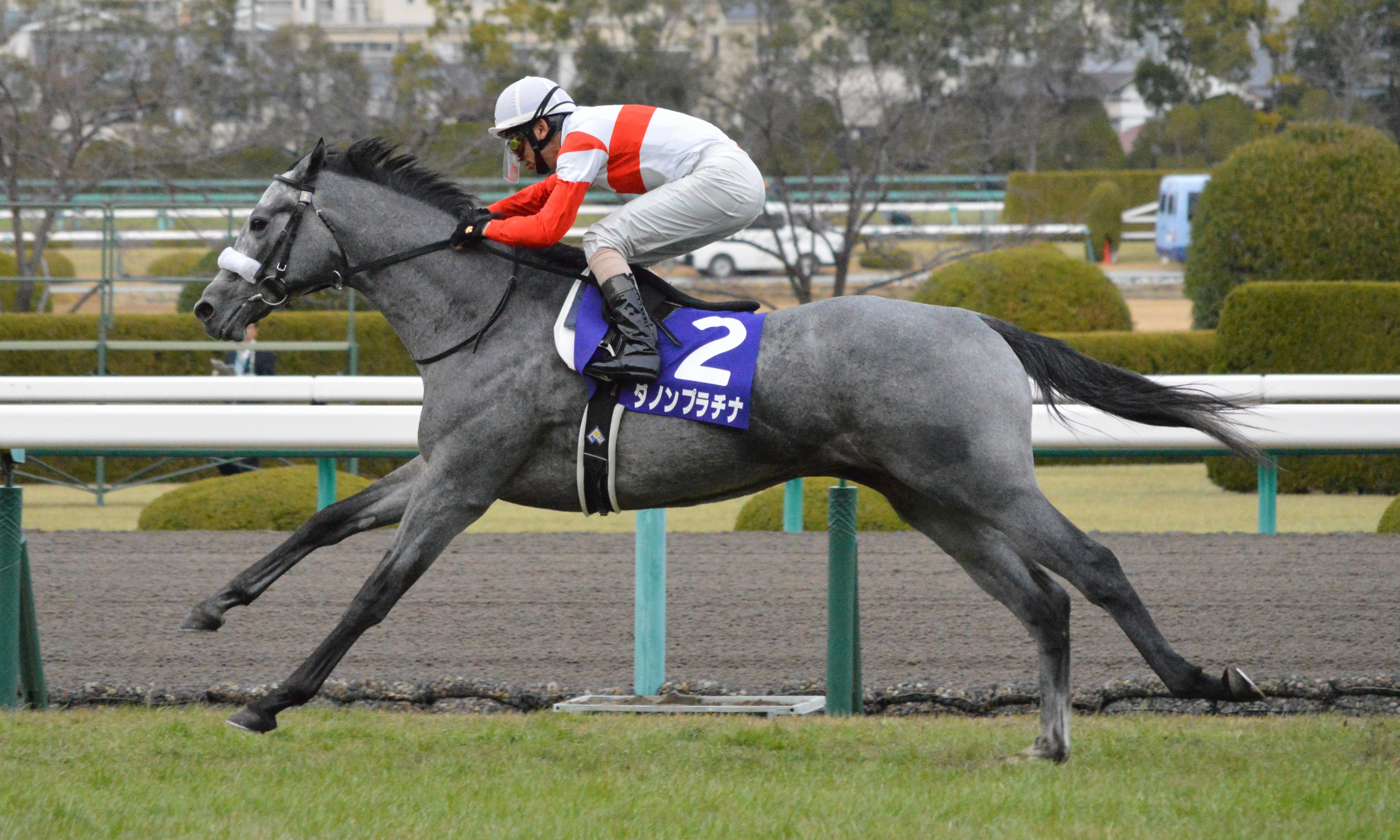
- Danon Platina in 2014
- Sire: Deep Impact
- Grandsire: Sunday Silence
- Dam: Badeelah
- Damsire: Unbridled's Song
- Sex: Stallion
- Foaled: 23 March 2012
- Country: Japan
- Colour: Grey
- Breeder: Chiyoda Farm Shizunai
- Owner: Danox Co Ltd
- Racing colours
- Trainer: Sakae Kunieda
- Jockey: Masayoshi Ebina
- Record: 15: 5-1-3
- Earnings: JPY195,823,000

Major wins
- Asahi Hai Futurity Stakes (2014); Fuji Stakes (2015); New Year Stakes (2018)

Awards
- JRA Award for Best Two-Year-Old Colt (2014)

Danon Platina (Japanese: ダノンプラチナ, foaled 23 March 2012) is a Japanese Thoroughbred racehorse and sire. He was the best two-year-old colt in Japan in 2014 when he won his last three races including the Asahi Hai Futurity Stakes and was the unanimous choice for the JRA Award for Best Two-Year-Old Colt. In the following year he finished third in a strong edition of the Spring Stakes and defeated older opponent in the Fuji Stakes. He remained in training for another three years but made only seven appearances and won only one more race, the Listed New Year Stakes in 2018. He was retired from racing to become a breeding stallion in South Africa.

== Background ==
Danon Platina is a grey stallion bred in Japan by Chiyoda Farm Shizunai. During his track career he carried the colours of Danox Co Ltd the business software enterprise of his owner Masahiro Noda, and was trained by Sakae Kunieda. He was ridden in most of his races by Masayoshi Ebina.

He was from the fifth crop of foals sired by Deep Impact, who was the Japanese Horse of the Year in 2005 and 2006, winning races including the Tokyo Yushun, Tenno Sho, Arima Kinen and Japan Cup. Deep Impact's other progeny include Gentildonna, Harp Star, Kizuna, A Shin Hikari, Marialite and Saxon Warrior. Danon Platina's dam Badeelah, from whom he inherited his grey colour, was an unraced, Kentucky-bred mare who was exported to Japan after being sold as a two-year-old for $32,000. Badeelah's dam Magical Allure won the La Brea Stakes and was closely related to the Kikuka Sho winner Narita Top Road.

== Racing career ==
=== 2014: two-year-old season ===
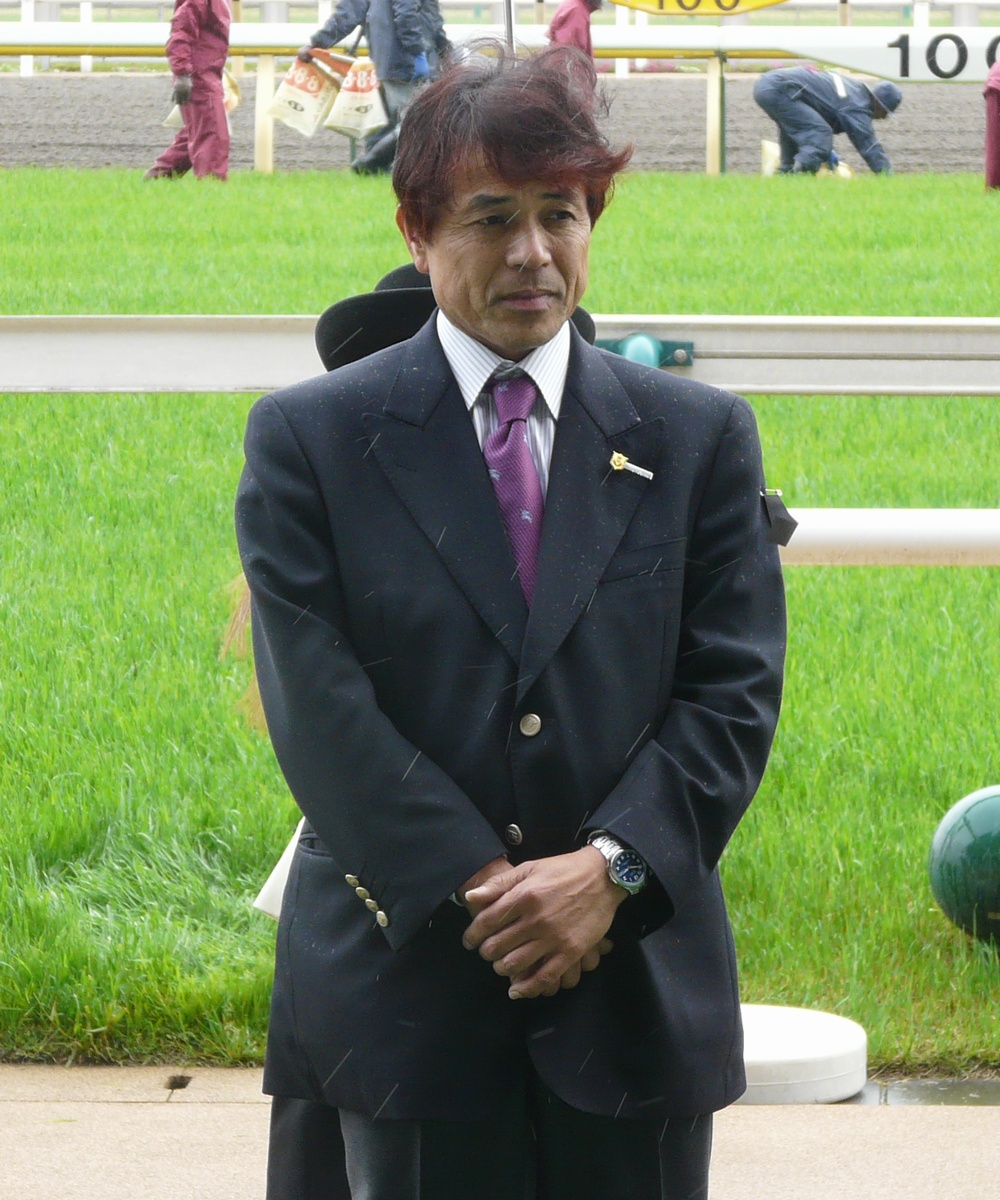
Danon Platina's trainer Sakae Kunieda

Danon Platina began his racing career at Sapporo Racecourse on 6 September 2014 when he finished second to Daitokyo in a contest for previously unraced juveniles over 1500 metres. In October he recorded his first success as he was a clear winner of a maiden race over 1600 metres at Tokyo Racecourse. In the Begonia Sho, over the same course and distance in November he won again, beating Mikki Universe by three lengths.

For his final race of the year Danon Platina was stepped up to the Grade 1 Asahi Hai Futurity Stakes over 1600 metres at Hanshin Racecourse on 21 December and was made the 3.6/1 favourite. The best fancied of his seventeen opponents included Bright Emblem (Sapporo Nisai Stakes), Tagano Epresso (Daily Hai Nisai Stakes), Clarity Sky (Icho Stakes), Tagagno Azaghal (Manryo Sho) and Navion (Kikyo Stakes). After being restrained by Ebina towards the rear of the field the favourite made a forward move on the wide outside entering the straight. He accelerated past his rivals, overtook the front-running outsider Active Minoru 200 metres from the finish and held off the late challenge of Arma Waioli to win by three quarters of a length. Ebina commented "He was relaxed and had enough left in him by the last corner for a strong final run. He definitely takes after his sire Deep Impact, his finishing speed speaks for itself".

In January 2015 Danon Platina was named Best Two-Year-Old Colt at the JRA Awards for 2014, being the unanimous choice of the 285 voters.

=== 2015: three-year-old season ===
On 22 March Danon Platina began his second campaign at Nakayama Racecourse in the Spring Stakes (a major trial for the Satsuki Sho) over 1800 metres and finished third, beaten a neck and half a length by Kitasan Black and Real Steel. In the Satsuki Sho over 2000 metres at the same track on 19 April he never looked likely to win and came home eleventh of the fifteen runners behind Duramente.

After a six month break Danon Platina returned in the Fuji Stakes over 1600 metres at Tokyo on 24 October, a race which saw him matched against older horses for the first time. Starting the 8.9/1 fourth choice in a sixteen-runner field he won by a neck and one and quarter lengths from the four-year-old Satono Aladdin and the five-year-old Logotype. For his final start of the year the colt was sent to Sha Tin Racecourse for the Hong Kong Mile on 13 December and came home seventh, three lengths behind the winner Maurice.

=== 2016, 2017 & 2018: later career ===
In 2016, Danon Platina began his season by finishing fourth behind the mare Smart Layer in the Tokyo Shimbun Hai on 7 February. After an absence of seven months he returned for the Keisei Hai Autumn Handicap at Nakayama in which he carried top weight and ran third to Lord Quest and Cafe Brilliant. At Tokyo in October he attempted to repeat his 2015 success in the Fuji Stakes but was beaten into third behind Young Man Power and Isla Bonita.

Danon Platina made only two appearances as a five-year-old in 2017 running fifth in the Sekiya Kinen at Niigata Racecourse in August and eighth in the Listed Capital Stakes at Tokyo in November.

On 28 January 2018 the six-year-old horse contested the Listed New Year Stakes over 1600 metres and recorded his first win for well over two years as he came home ahead of the Hanshin Cup winner Shuji and eight others. On his final racecourse appearance he came home eleventh of the sixteen runners behind the filly Lys Gracieux in the Tokyo Shimbun Hai on 4 February.

== Racing form ==
Danon Platina won five races and placed in another three out of 15 starts. This data is available on JBIS, netkeiba and HKJC.

Date	Race	Grade	Distance	Surface	Track	Entry	Finish	Time	Margin	Jockey	Winner (Runner-up)
2014 – two-year-old season
Sep 6	2YO Debut		1500m	Turf	Sapporo	14	2nd	1:32.5	0.2	Masayoshi Ebina	Daitokyo
Oct 13	2YO Maiden		1600m	Turf	Tokyo	18	1st	1:35.5	–0.7	Masayoshi Ebina	(Moon Majesty)
Nov 20	Begonia Sho		1600m	Turf	Tokyo	13	1st	1:34.3	–0.5	Masayoshi Ebina	(Mikki Universe)
Dec 21	Asahi Hai Futurity Stakes		1600m	Turf	Hanshin	18	1st	1:35.9	–0.1	Masayoshi Ebina	(Arma Waioli)
2015 – three-year-old season
Mar 22	Spring Stakes	2	1800m	Turf	Nakayama	12	3rd	1:49.5	0.1	Masayoshi Ebina	Kitasan Black
Apr 19	Satsuki Sho	1	2000m	Turf	Nakayama	15	11th	1:59.5	1.3	Masayoshi Ebina	Duramente
Oct 24	Fuji Stakes	3	1600m	Turf	Tokyo	16	1st	1:32.7	0.0	Masayoshi Ebina	(Satono Aladdin)
Dec 13	Hong Kong Mile	1	1600m	Turf	Sha Tin	14	7th	1:34.4	0.5	Masayoshi Ebina	Maurice
2016 – four-year-old season
Feb 7	Tokyo Shimbun Hai	3	1600m	Turf	Tokyo	14	4th	1:34.6	0.5	Masayoshi Ebina	Smart Layer
Sep 11	Keisei Hai Autumn Handicap	3	1600m	Turf	Nakayama	15	3rd	1:33.3	0.3	Masayoshi Ebina	Lord Quest
Oct 22	Fuji Stakes	3	1600m	Turf	Tokyo	11	3rd	1:34.2	0.2	Masayoshi Ebina	Young Man Power
2017 – five-year-old season
Aug 13	Sekiya Kinen	3	1600m	Turf	Niigata	16	5th	1:32.5	0.3	Masayoshi Ebina	Maltese Apogee
Sep 10	Keisei Hai Autumn Handicap	3	1600m	Turf	Nakayama	15	Scratched	–	–	Masayoshi Ebina	Grand Silk
Nov 25	Capital Stakes	L	1600m	Turf	Tokyo	18	8th	1:33.3	0.7	Masayoshi Ebina	Daiwa Cagney
2018 – six-year-old season
Jan 14	New Year Stakes	L	1600m	Turf	Nakayama	10	1st	1:34.5	–0.2	Masayoshi Ebina	(Shuji)
Feb 4	Tokyo Shimbun Hai	3	1600m	Turf	Tokyo	16	11th	1:34.6	0.5	Hironobu Tanabe	Lys Gracieux

== Stud record ==
After the end of his racing career, Danon Platina was retired and on June 20, 2018 removed from the JRA racehorse registration. He became a breeding stallion at the Mauritzfontein Stud, Northern Cape, South Africa.

== Pedigree ==
Pedigree of Danon Platina (JPN), grey stallion 2012
Sire Deep Impact (JPN) 2002	Sunday Silence (USA); 1986	Halo	Hail to Reason
Sire Deep Impact (JPN) 2002	Sunday Silence (USA); 1986	Halo	Cosmah
Sire Deep Impact (JPN) 2002	Sunday Silence (USA); 1986	Wishing Well	Understanding
Sire Deep Impact (JPN) 2002	Sunday Silence (USA); 1986	Wishing Well	Mountain Flower
Sire Deep Impact (JPN) 2002	Wind in Her Hair (IRE); 1991	Alzao (USA)	Lyphard
Sire Deep Impact (JPN) 2002	Wind in Her Hair (IRE); 1991	Alzao (USA)	Lady Rebecca (GB)
Sire Deep Impact (JPN) 2002	Wind in Her Hair (IRE); 1991	Burghclere (GB)	Busted
Sire Deep Impact (JPN) 2002	Wind in Her Hair (IRE); 1991	Burghclere (GB)	Highclere
Dam Badeelah (USA) 2008	Unbridled's Song; 1993	Unbridled	Fappiano
Dam Badeelah (USA) 2008	Unbridled's Song; 1993	Unbridled	Gana Facil
Dam Badeelah (USA) 2008	Unbridled's Song; 1993	Trolley Song	Caro (IRE)
Dam Badeelah (USA) 2008	Unbridled's Song; 1993	Trolley Song	Lucky Spell
Dam Badeelah (USA) 2008	Magical Allure; 1995	General Meeting	Seattle Slew
Dam Badeelah (USA) 2008	Magical Allure; 1995	General Meeting	Alydar's Promise
Dam Badeelah (USA) 2008	Magical Allure; 1995	Rare Lady	Never Bend
Dam Badeelah (USA) 2008	Magical Allure; 1995	Rare Lady	Double Agent (Family: 18)
