= Maurice (horse) =

Japanese-bred Thoroughbred racehorse

Maurice モーリス
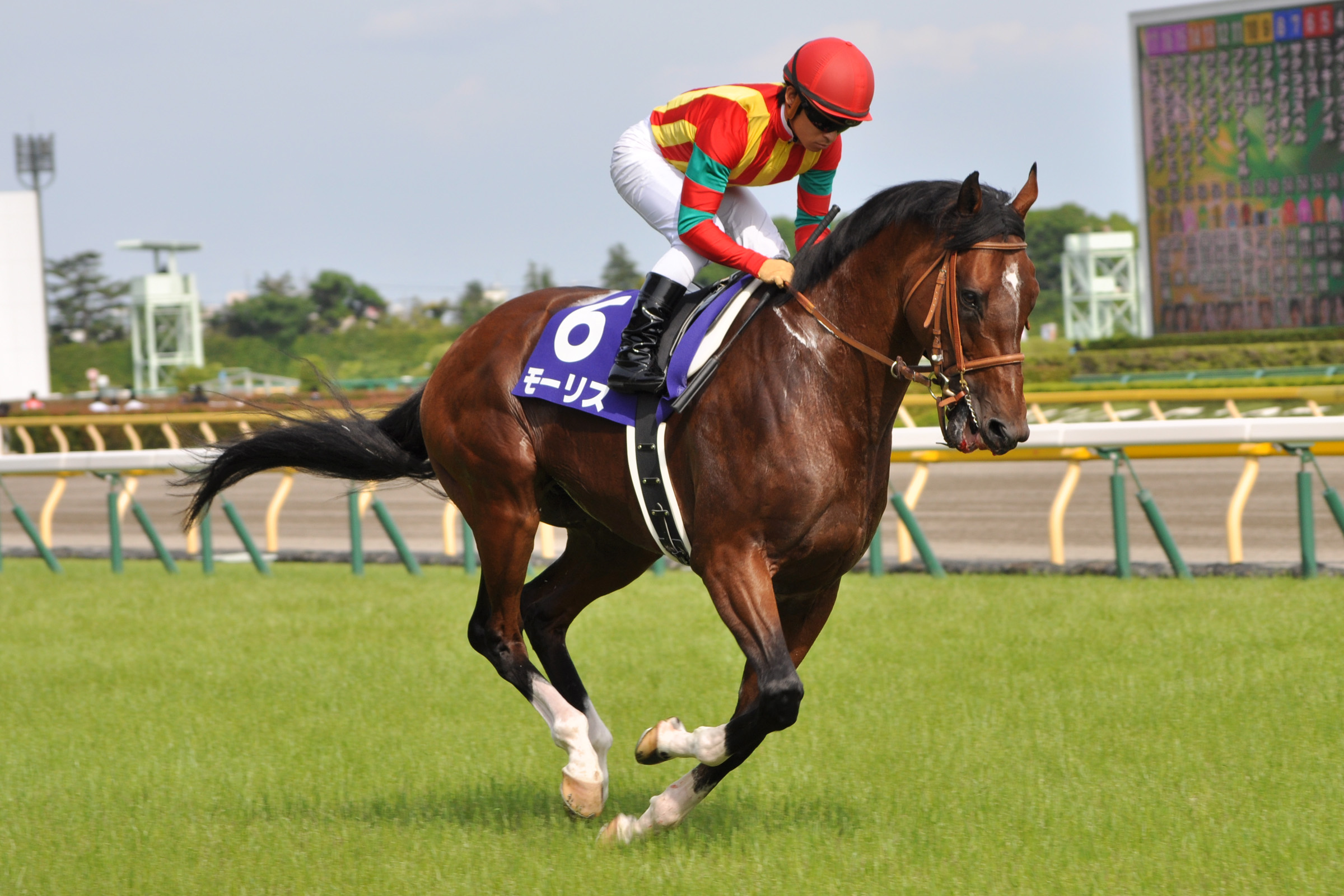
- Maurice at Tokyo Racecourse in June 2015.
- Breed: Thoroughbred
- Sire: Screen Hero
- Grandsire: Grass Wonder
- Dam: Mejiro Frances
- Damsire: Carnegie
- Sex: Stallion
- Foaled: 2 March 2011 (age 15)
- Country: Japan
- Colour: Bay
- Breeder: Togawa Bokujo
- Owner: Kazumi Yoshida
- Racing colours
- Trainer: Naohiro Yoshida; Noriyuki Hori
- Jockey: Ryan Moore
- Record: 18: 11-2-1
- Earnings: ¥1,083,685,000; Japan: ¥536,246,000; Hong Kong: HKD35,340,000

Major wins
- Lord Derby Challenge Trophy (2015); Yasuda Kinen (2015); Mile Championship (2015); Hong Kong Mile (2015); Champions Mile (2016); Tenno Sho (Autumn) (2016); Hong Kong Cup (2016)

Awards
- Japanese Horse of the Year (2015); JRA Award for Best Sprinter or Miler (2015); JRA Special Award (2016)

Honours
- Top-rated Japanese horse (2016); Timeform rating: 132
- Last updated on 11 March 2026

Maurice (Japanese: モーリス, Hepburn: Mōrisu; 2 March 2011) is a Japanese Thoroughbred racehorse and active breeding stallion. After showing promise as a two-year-old he disappointed in 2014, being well-beaten in all four of his races. In 2015 he emerged as one of the best milers in the world with an unbeaten record of six wins from six races. After two minor wins early in the year he recorded his first important success in the Lord Derby Challenge Trophy before taking the Grade I Yasuda Kinen. He returned in autumn to win the Mile Championship and then defeated a strong international field in the Hong Kong Mile. His performances in 2015 saw him named Best Japanese Sprinter or Miler and Japanese Horse of the Year. In the following year he won the Champions Mile before moving up in distance in the autumn to win the Autumn Tennō Shō and the Hong Kong Cup.

== Background ==
Maurice is a bay horse with a white star and four white socks bred in Japan by the Togawa Bokujo.

He is from the first crop of foals sired by Screen Hero, the winner of the 2008 Japan Cup: others from the same crop have included the Arima Kinen winner Gold Actor. Maurice's dam Mejiro Frances showed no ability on the track, failing to win or place in eight starts, but has produced three minor winners. She was a great-granddaughter of Mejiro Bosatsu whose other descendants have included the Yushun Himba winner Mejiro Dober.

In 2013, the two-year-old colt was put up for auction at the Hokkaido Breeders' Association sale and was bought for ¥10,500,000 by Kazumi Yoshida of Northern Farm. The colt was sent into training with Naohiro Yoshida.

== Racing career ==
=== 2013: two-year-old season ===
Maurice made his racecourse debut in a contest for previously unraced horses over 1400 metres at Kyoto Racecourse on 6 October and won in a record time of 1:20.6. He was then moved up in class for the Grade II Keio Hei Nisan Stakes at Tokyo Racecourse in November. Ridden by the British jockey Ryan Moore he started the 1/2 favourite but finished sixth of the fourteen runners behind Karada Legend. He ended the season by winning a race over 1400 metres at Hanshin Racecourse on 23 December.

=== 2014: three-year-old season ===
Maurice began his second season by finishing behind Mikki Isle in the Grade III Nikkan Sports Sho Shinzan Kinen over 1600 metres at Kyoto in January and then ran fourth behind Rosa Gigantea in the Grade II Fuji TV Sho Spring Stakes (a trial race for the Satsuki Sho) at Nakayama Racecourse in March. He ran twice in May finishing seventh in the Grade II Kyoto Shimbun Hai at Kyoto and third in the Shirayuri Stakes at the same track. He was later transferred to the stable of Noriyuki Hori and did not race again in 2014.

=== 2015: four-year-old season ===
After a break of almost eight months, Maurice returned to win the Wakashio Sho at Nakayama in January and added a victory in the Spica Stakes at the same track in March. The colt was then moved up in class for the Grade III Lord Derby Challenge Trophy, a handicap race over 1600 metres at Nakayama on 5 April. Ridden by Keita Tosaki he produced a strong finish to win by three and a half lengths from Clarity Sky, covering the last 200 metres in 10.9 seconds.

On 7 June at Tokyo, Maurice was one of seventeen horses to contest the Grade I Yasuda Kinen and started the 2.7/1 favourite. His opponents included the Grade I winners Danon Shark (Mile Championship), Curren Black Hill (NHK Mile Cup), Mikki Isle, Meisho Mambo (Yushun Himba, Shuka Sho, Queen Elizabeth II Cup) and Real Impact (2011 Yasuda Kinen, George Ryder Stakes). Ridden by Yuga Kawada he was settled in fifth place as Real Impact and Keiai Elegant disputed the lead before moving into third on the final turn. He took the lead approaching the last 200 metres and held off the late challenge of Vincennes to win by a neck. After the race Kawada said "He was a bit eager to go but I was able to keep him under control. He ran a really smooth race. I thought that we would be able to win easily but when Vincennes closed in behind us, I urged him to go, hoping that the colt will manage to fend him off. He has matured a lot since I last rode him over a year ago and so I was able to ride him with confidence".

After a break of five months which was partly due to a back injury, Maurice returned for the Grade I Mile Championship at Kyoto on 22 November. He was made the 4.7/1 third favourite behind Isla Bonita (Satsuki Sho), Fiero and Satono Aladdin whilst the other fourteen runners included Danon Shark, Curren Black Hill, Real Impact, Vincennes, Let's Go Donki (Oka Sho), Clarity Sky (NHK Mile Cup), Logotype (Asahi Hai Futurity Stakes, Satsuki Sho), Keiai Elegant and Red Reveur (Hanshin Juvenile Fillies). Ridden by Ryan Moore he raced on the wide outside throughout the race as Let's Go Donki set the pace and was still well back in the field on the final turn. He accelerated in the straight as the leaders tired, took the lead 100 metres from the finish and won by one and a quarter lengths and a neck from Fiero and Isla Bonita. Ryan Moore commented "I knew that he was probably going to be the best miler in the race and it was just a question of getting a clean trip and hopefully if we kept things straight forward, he would be able to show that he's the best horse, and he did. He showed a really good turn of foot in the last 400 meters. I rode him when he was a two-year-old but he's developed into a fast strong horse". He became the tenth horse, and the first since Daiwa Major, to complete the Yasuda Kinen- Mile Championship double.

For his final appearance of the season, Maurice was sent to contest the Hong Kong Mile at Sha Tin Racecourse on 13 December and started second favourite behind the outstanding local miler Able Friend with Fiero and Danon Platina (Asahi Hai Futurity Stakes) accompanying him on the trip from Japan. Europe was represented by Esoterique, Toormore, the Premio Vittorio di Capua winner Red Dubawi and the Breeders' Cup Mile runner-up Mondialiste. Ryan Moore again restrained the colt on the outside for most of the way before making a forward move in the straight. Able Friend briefly gained the advantage from the local outsider Giant Treasure, but Maurice accelerated past the two Hong Kong horses in the last 100 metres to win by three quarters of a length from the rallying Giant Treasure, with Able Friend a neck away in third. After the race, Moore said "It went very smoothly, he was probably not quite at his best but he fought really well".

=== 2016: five-year-old season ===
Maurice was expected to begin his 2016 campaign in the Dubai Turf at Meydan Racecourse in March but was withdrawn from the race after a training setback. He made his seasonal debut with a return to Hong Kong for the Champions Mile on 1 May. He was ridden by the local jockey João Moreira and started favourite ahead of the local runners Contentment (Queen's Silver Jubilee Cup), Giant Treasure (Stewards' Cup) and Beauty Only (Chairman's Trophy). Maurice raced in mid-division before accelerating in the straight and won by two lengths from Contentment. Moreira commented "When I gave him the daylight, he went on his own... The feeling he gave me today, very few horses could give to their jockeys." Maurice returned to Japan and started favourite to repeat his 2015 success in the Yasuda Kinen in which he was ridden by Tommy Berry. He sustained his first defeat for more than two years as he fought against Berry's attempts to restrain him in the early stages and was beaten one and a quarter lengths by the six-year-old Logotype. Berry explained "The pace was slower than I expected and I couldn't get cover behind horses so he couldn't be patient".

After a two and a half month break, Maurice returned to the track and was moved up in distance for the Grade II Sapporo Kinen over 2000 metres at Sapporo Racecourse on 21 August. He started odds-on favourite but was beaten into second by his stablemate Neorealism. He was then given another break before being trained for the autumn edition of the Tenno Sho over 2000 metres at Tokyo on 30 October. Before the race Hori commented "His right and left foreleg action is unbalanced, so it's been important to work on this, but he's clearly better cornering to the left, and given the long straight at Tokyo, he should be fine. As for the distance, on his breeding it's not a worry." Ridden by Ryan Moore he started favourite against fourteen opponents including A Shin Hikari, Lovely Day, Real Steel (Dubai Turf) and Logotype. The favourite raced in sixth place behind A Shin Hikari but then moved out to deliver his challenge down the centre of the course in the straight. He joined the leaders 300 metres out and drew ahead to win by one and a half lengths from the fast-finishing Real Steel with Staphanos taking third place. Ryan Moore said after the race "He's a very good horse, he's strong at a mile and very hard to beat. Today I thought 2,000 meters was probably his best performance. He's very strong, he's got a good turn of foot and he was dominant today. He couldn’t have been more impressive."

Maurice and Moore were reunited when the horse made what was expected to be his final racecourse appearance in the Hong Kong Cup over 2000 metres at Sha Tin on 11 December. He was made odds-on favourite ahead of Designs On Rome and A Shin Hikari in a twelve-runner field. The other runners included Lovely Day, Staphanos and Queens Ring (Queen Elizabeth II Commemorative Cup) from Japan, Elliptique (Bayerisches Zuchtrennen) from France and five other runners from Hong Kong headed by Secret Weapon Jockey Club Cup and Blazing Speed (Queen Elizabeth II Cup, Champions & Chater Cup). The favourite started slowly and was restrained towards the rear of the field as A Shin Hikari set the pace and opened up a clear lead. Maurice began to make progress in the last quarter mile, overtook A Shin Hikari inside the final furlong and quickened away to win by three lengths. Ryan Moore explained that the poor start had made things more difficult but added "When we found room to run, he just let down... He's improved every time I rode him. He's a big, strong horse and he's got better with racing". When asked if the horse would now be retired to stud, Noriyuki Hori said "That's what they're writing in the newspapers".

== Racing form ==
Maurice won 11 races and podium in another three out of 18 starts. This data is available based on JBIS, netkeiba and HKJC.

Date	Track	Race	Grade	Distance (Condition)	Entry	HN	Odds (Favored)	Finish	Time	Margins	Jockey	Winner (Runner-up)
2013 – two-year-old season
Oct 6	Kyoto	2yo Newcomer		1,400 m (Firm)	12	4	4.3 (1)	1st	R1:20.6	–0.5	Hiroyuki Uchida	(Invoke)
Nov 9	Tokyo	Keio Hai Nisai Stakes	2	1,400 m (Firm)	14	8	1.5 (1)	6th	1:23.5	0.4	Ryan Moore	Karada Legend
Dec 23	Hanshin	Manryo Sho	ALW (1W)	1,400 m (Firm)	11	8	1.5 (1)	1st	1:22.7	–0.1	Yuga Kawada	(Fermezza)
2014 – three-year-old season
Jan 12	Kyoto	Shinzan Kinen	3	1,600 m (Firm)	13	11	6.4 (3)	5th	1:34.9	1.1	Hiroyuki Uchida	Mikki Isle
Mar 23	Nakayama	Spring Stakes	2	1,800 m (Firm)	15	5	19.8 (5)	4th	1:48.8	0.4	Yuga Kawada	Rosa Gigantea
May 10	Kyoto	Kyoto Shimbun Hai	2	2,200 m (Firm)	18	17	13.1 (7)	7th	2:11.5	0.5	Yuga Kawada	Hagino Hybrid
May 31	Kyoto	Shirayuri Stakes	OP	1,800 m (Firm)	12	1	7.1 (4)	3rd	1:45.2	0.1	Suguru Hamanaka	Staphanos
2015 – four-year-old season
Jan 25	Nakayama	Wakashio Sho	ALW (2W)	1,600 m (Firm)	16	7	1.9 (1)	1st	1:33.7	–0.5	Tommy Berry	(Sakura d'Amour)
Mar 7	Nakayama	Spica Stakes	ALW (3W)	1,800 m (Good)	11	1	1.5 (1)	1st	1:50.2	–0.1	Keita Tosaki	(Daiwa Liberal)
Apr 5	Nakayama	Lord Derby Challenge Trophy	3	1,600 m (Firm)	16	10	3.1 (1)	1st	1:32.2	–0.6	Keita Tosaki	(Clarity City)
Jun 7	Tokyo	Yasuda Kinen	1	1,600 m (Firm)	17	6	3.7 (1)	1st	1:32.0	0.0	Yuga Kawada	(Vincennes)
Nov 22	Kyoto	Mile Championship	1	1,600 m (Firm)	18	16	5.7 (4)	1st	1:32.8	–0.2	Ryan Moore	(Fiero)
Dec 13	Sha Tin	Hong Kong Mile	1	1,600 m (Good)	14	2	4.1 (2)	1st	1:33.9	–0.1	Ryan Moore	(Giant Treasure)
2016 – five-year-old season
May 1	Sha Tin	Champions Mile	1	1,600 m (Good)	12	1	2.1 (1)	1st	1:34.1	–0.3	Joao Moreira	(Contentment)
Jun 5	Tokyo	Yasuda Kinen	1	1,600 m (Firm)	12	8	1.7 (1)	2nd	1:33.2	0.2	Tommy Berry	Logotype
Aug 21	Sapporo	Sapporo Kinen	2	2,000 m (Good)	16	15	1.6 (1)	2nd	2:02.0	0.3	Joao Moreira	Neorealism
Oct 30	Tokyo	Tenno Sho (Autumn)	1	2,000 m (Firm)	15	8	3.6 (1)	1st	1:59.3	–0.2	Ryan Moore	(Real Steel)
Dec 11	Sha Tin	Hong Kong Cup	1	2,000 m (Firm)	12	2	1.6 (1)	1st	2:01.0	–0.4	Ryan Moore	(Secret Weapon)

Legend:
Turf

- R indicated that it was a record time finish

== Stud career ==
Maurice travels as a shuttle stallion each year between the Shadai Stallion Station in Japan for the northern hemisphere breeding season and the Arrowfield Stud in Australia for the southern hemisphere.

=== Notable progeny ===
Below data is based on JBIS Stallion Report, and Breednet Stallion Stakes Results.

c = colt, f = filly, g = gelding
bold = grade 1 stakes

**Foaled**	**Name**	**Sex**	**Major wins**
2018	Pixie Knight	c	Shinzan Kinen, **Sprinters Stakes**
2018	Shigeru Pink Ruby	f	Fillies' Revue
2018	Hitotsu	c	**Victoria Derby, Australian Guineas, Australian Derby**
2018	Jack d'Or	c	Kinko Sho, Sapporo Kinen, **Ōsaka Hai**
2018	Mazu	g	Arrowfield 3YO Sprint, **Doomben 10,000**, Hall Mark Stakes (2024, 2025, 2026), The Shorts (ATC)
2018	Geraldina	f	Sankei Sho All Comers, **Queen Elizabeth II Cup**
2018	North Bridge	c	Epsom Cup, American Jockey Club Cup, Sapporo Kinen
2018	Divina	f	Fuchu Himba Stakes
2018	Rook's Nest	c	Falcon Stakes
2019	Lagulf	c	Nakayama Kimpai
2019	Bank Maur	c	Alister Clark Stakes
2019	Kibou	g	Up and Coming Stakes
2019	Kafuji Octagon	c	Leopard Stakes
2019	Matenro Sky	g	Nakayama Kinen
2019	Al Naseem	c	Chukyo Kinen, Nakayama Kimpai
2020	Nocking Point	c	Mainichi Hai, Niigata Kinen
2020	Genzano	f	Spring Stakes (NJC)
2020	Cosmic Crusader	g	**Northerly Stakes,** Bletchingly Stakes, P B Lawrence Stakes, **Turnbull Stakes, W. S. Cox Plate,** **Railway Stakes**
2021	Strauss	c	Tokyo Sports Hai Nisai Stakes
2021	Danon McKinley	c	Falcon Stakes, Swan Stakes
2022	Arte Veloce	c	Saudi Arabia Royal Cup
2022	Admire Zoom	c	**Asahi Hai Futurity Stakes**, Yomiuri Milers Cup
2022	Ethereum Girl	f	Sires' Produce Stakes (SAJC)
2023	Zoroastro	c	Kisaragi Sho, Niigata Kinen
2023	Icelady	f	Thousand Guineas Prelude
2024	Pulvinar	f	Artemis Stakes

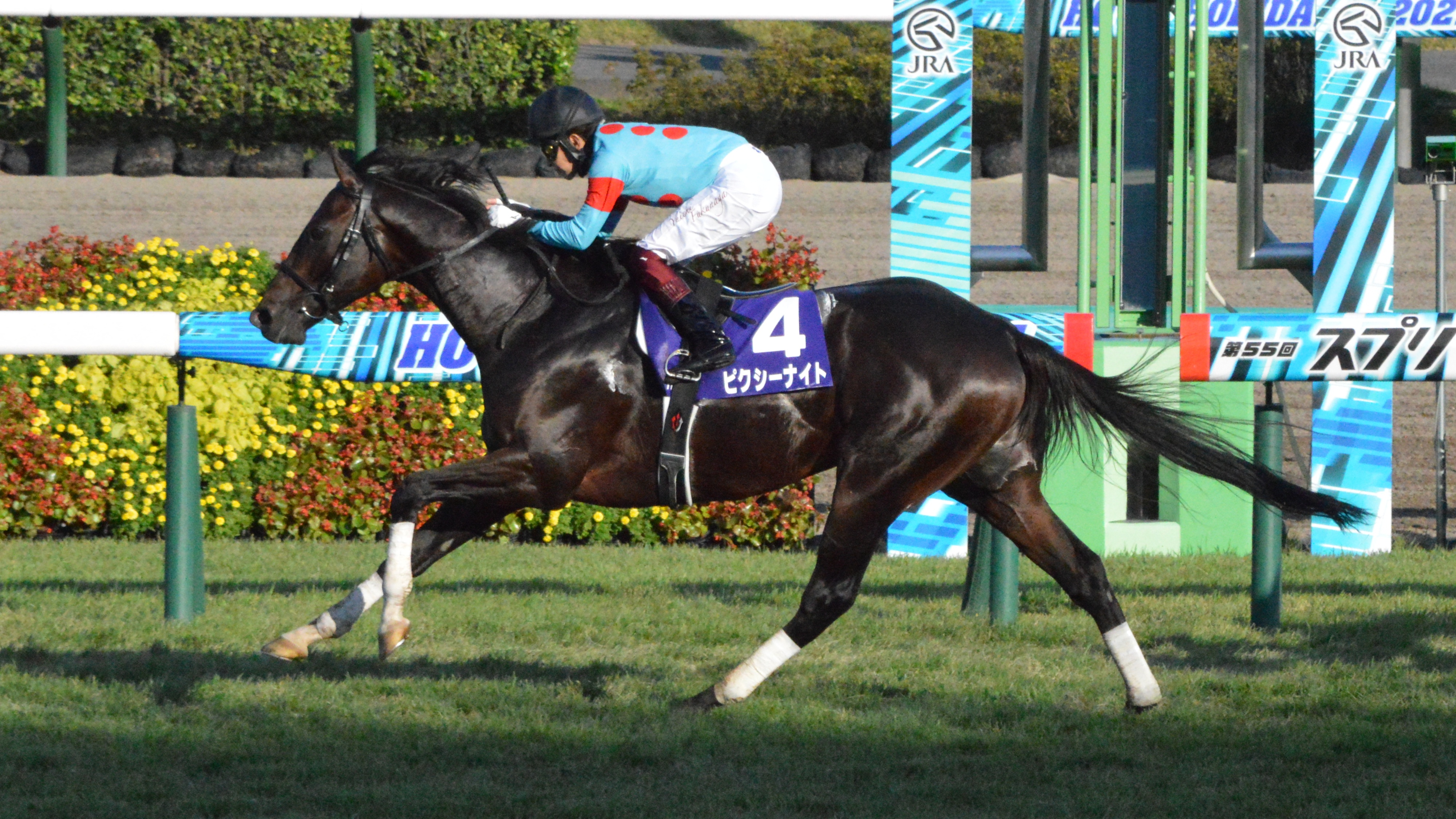
Pixie Knight

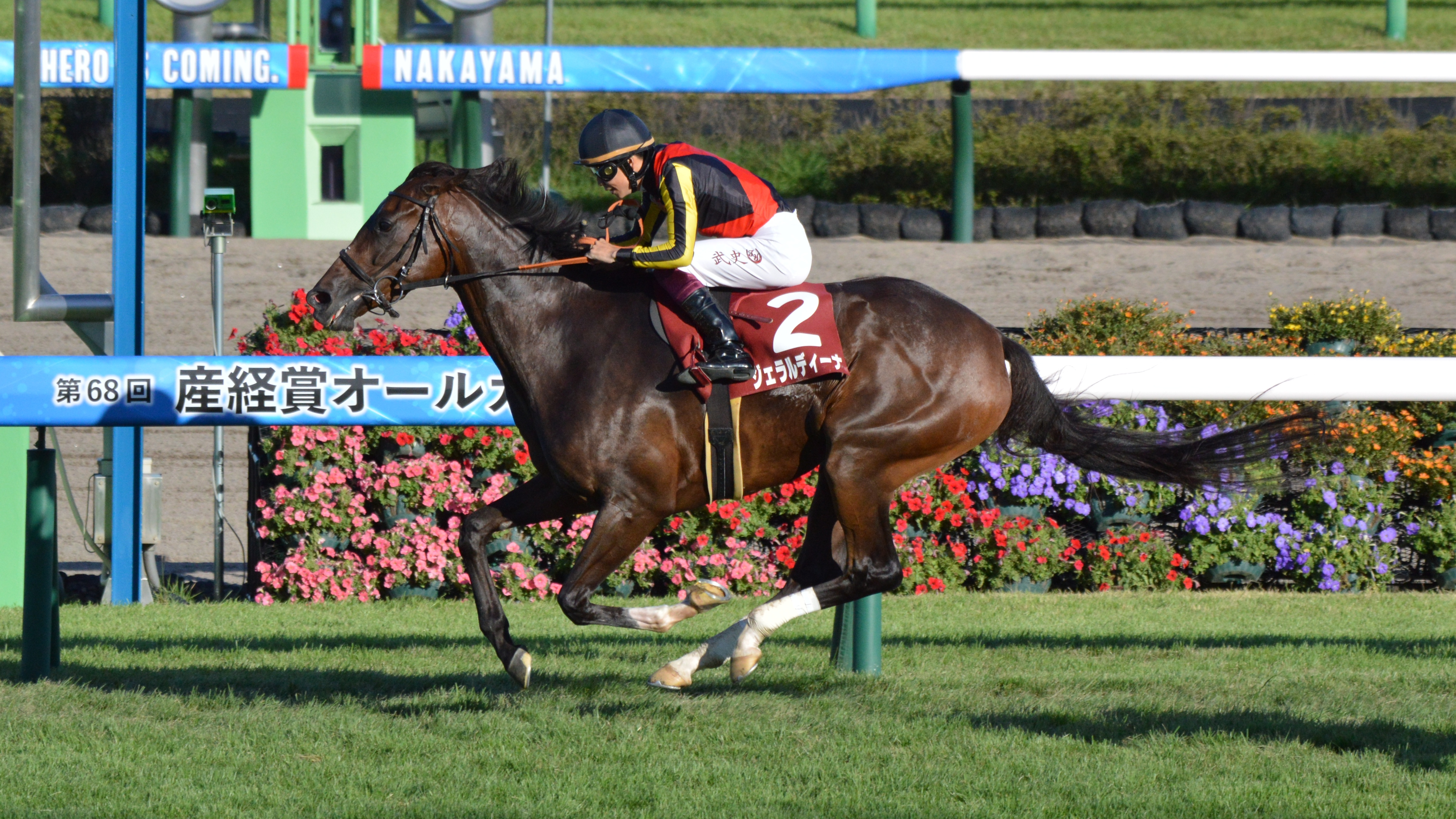
Geraldina

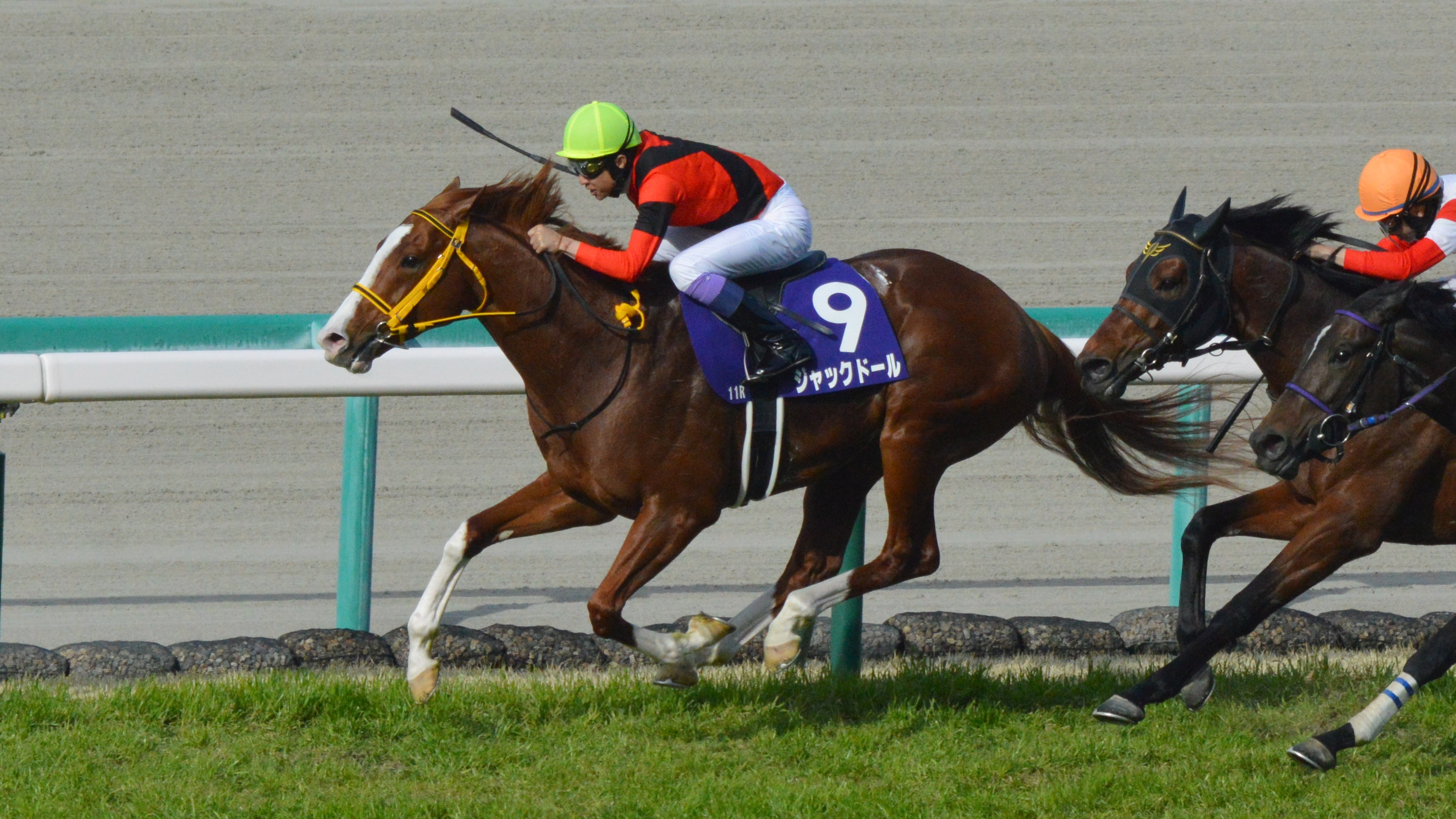
Jack d'Or

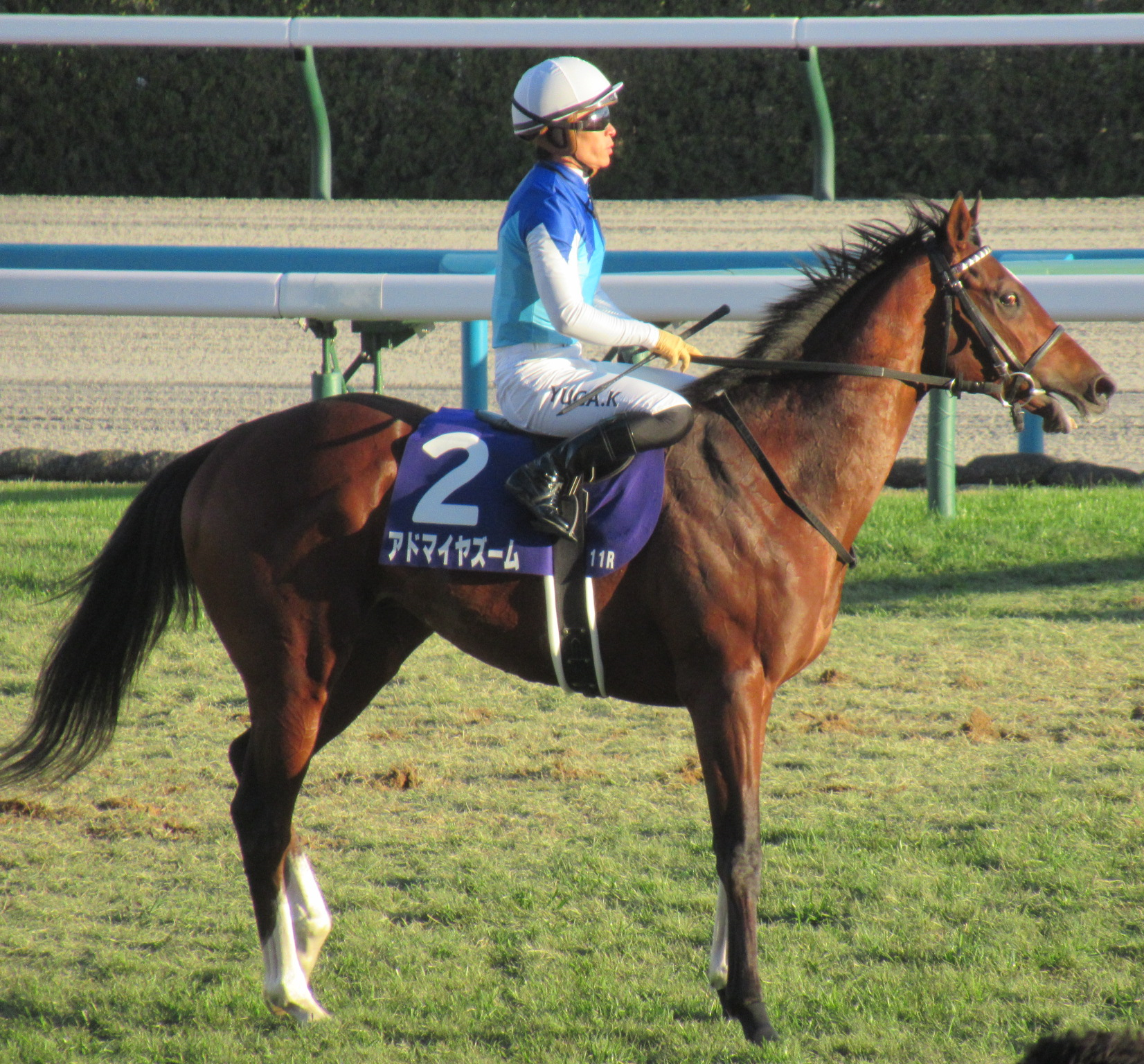
Admire Zoom

== Assessment and awards ==
In January 2016 Maurice was nominated in three categories of the 2015 JRA Awards. In the poll for Japanese Horse of the Year he received 215 of the 291 votes to take the title ahead of Lovely Day, Duramente and Kitasan Black. He was also named Best Sprinter or Miler with 243 votes, ahead of the mare Straight Girl but in the poll for Best Older Male Horse he was beaten 174-114 by Lovely Day.

In the JRA Awards for 2016 Maurice finished runner-up in the polling for three separate categories- Horse of the Year, Best Older Male and Best Sprinter or Miler. He did however receive the JRA Special Award. In the 2016 edition of the World's Best Racehorse Rankings Maurice was given a rating of 127 (level with A Shin Hikari), making him the 5th best racehorse in the world and the top-rated horse in Japan.

== Pedigree ==
Pedigree of Maurice (JPN), bay horse, 2011
Sire Screen Hero (JPN) 2004	Grass Wonder (USA); 1995	Silver Hawk	Roberto
Sire Screen Hero (JPN) 2004	Grass Wonder (USA); 1995	Silver Hawk	Gris Vitesse
Sire Screen Hero (JPN) 2004	Grass Wonder (USA); 1995	Ameriflora	Danzig
Sire Screen Hero (JPN) 2004	Grass Wonder (USA); 1995	Ameriflora	Graceful Touch
Sire Screen Hero (JPN) 2004	Running Heroine (JPN); 1993	Sunday Silence	Halo
Sire Screen Hero (JPN) 2004	Running Heroine (JPN); 1993	Sunday Silence	Wishing Well
Sire Screen Hero (JPN) 2004	Running Heroine (JPN); 1993	Dyna Actress	Northern Taste
Sire Screen Hero (JPN) 2004	Running Heroine (JPN); 1993	Dyna Actress	Model Sport
Dam Mejiro Frances (JPN) 2001	Carnegie (GB); 1991	Sadler's Wells	Northern Dancer
Dam Mejiro Frances (JPN) 2001	Carnegie (GB); 1991	Sadler's Wells	Fairy Bridge
Dam Mejiro Frances (JPN) 2001	Carnegie (GB); 1991	Detroit	Riverman
Dam Mejiro Frances (JPN) 2001	Carnegie (GB); 1991	Detroit	Derna
Dam Mejiro Frances (JPN) 2001	Mejiro Monterey (JPN); 1986	Mogami	Lyphard
Dam Mejiro Frances (JPN) 2001	Mejiro Monterey (JPN); 1986	Mogami	No Luck
Dam Mejiro Frances (JPN) 2001	Mejiro Monterey (JPN); 1986	Mejiro Quincey	Fidion
Dam Mejiro Frances (JPN) 2001	Mejiro Monterey (JPN); 1986	Mejiro Quincey	Mejiro Bosatsu (Family: 10-d)
