= Logotype (horse) =

Japanese-bred Thoroughbred racehorse

Logotype ロゴタイプ
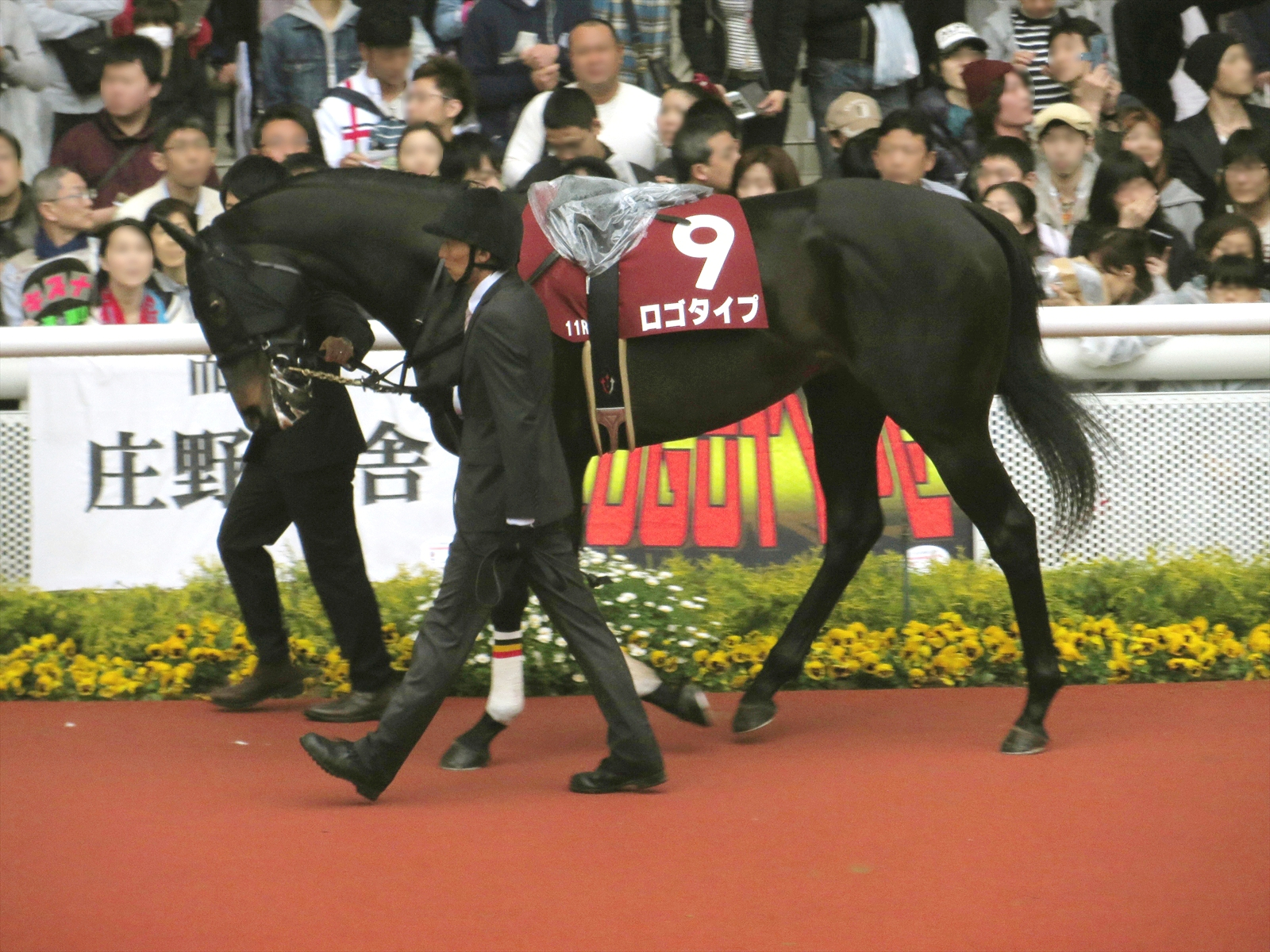
- Logotype at the paddock of the 2015 Ōsaka Hai.
- Breed: Thoroughbred
- Sire: Lohengrin (JPN)
- Grandsire: Singspiel (IRE)
- Dam: Stereotype (JPN)
- Damsire: Sunday Silence (USA)
- Sex: Stallion
- Foaled: March 10, 2010 (age 16)
- Country: Japan
- Colour: Dark bay
- Breeder: Shadai Farm
- Owner: Teruya Yoshida
- Racing colours
- Trainer: Tsuyoshi Tanaka
- Jockey: Mirco Demuro; Cristian Demuro; Hironobu Tanabe
- Record: 30: 6-4-4
- Earnings: ¥583,011,000

Major wins
- Asahi Hai Futurity Stakes (2012); Spring Stakes (2013); Yasuda Kinen (2016); Japanese Classic Race wins: Satsuki Sho (2013)

Awards
- JRA Award for Best Two-Year-Old Colt (2012)

Logotype (Japanese: ロゴタイプ, Hepburn: Rogotaipu; foaled 10 March 2010) is a retired Japanese Thoroughbred racehorse and active sire. As a juvenile in 2012 he won two minor races in his first four starts before recording an upset victory in the Asahi Hai Futurity Stakes, which resulted in his taking the JRA Award for Best Two-Year-Old Colt. In the following spring he maintained his winning form by taking the Spring Stakes and then winning the Satsuki Sho in record time. He failed to win for over three years before taking the Yasuda Kinen as a six-year-old in 2016.

== Background ==
Logotype is a dark bay horse standing 168 cm tall with no white markings bred in Japan by his owner, Teruya Yoshida's Shadai Farm. During his racing career he was trained by Tsuyoshi Tanaka.

He was the most successful racehorse sired by Lohengrin, a top-class Japanese miler who won the Yomiuri Milers Cup and the Nakayama Kinen and was placed in the Prix du Moulin, Takarazuka Kinen and Yasuda Kinen. Logotype's dam showed modest racing ability, winning two minor races in Japan from twenty-two starts. Her dam Star Ballerina won the Rose Stakes in 1993 and was a distant relative of the Belmont Stakes winner Vito.

== Racing career ==
=== 2012: two-year-old season ===
Logotype made a successful racecourse debut when he won a contest for previously unraced juveniles over 1200 metres at Hakodate Racecourse on 24 June. For his next three races the colt was stepped up in class and ran well despite failing to win: he finished fourth to Stalk And Ray in the Grade 3 Hakodate Nisai Stakes on 14 July, third to At Will in the Listed Clover Sho over 1500 metres at Sapporo Racecourse on 4 August and fourth behind Codino in the Grade 3 Sapporo Nisai Stakes over 1800 metres on 1 September. After an autumn break Logotype returned in the Begonia Sho over 1600 metres at Tokyo Racecourse on 25 November and won in a race record time of 1:33.6.

On 16 December Logotype was partnered by Mirco Demuro when he started a 34/1 outsider in Japan's most prestigious race for two-year-olds, the Asahi Hai Futurity Stakes over 1600 metres at Tokyo. Codino was the odds-on favourite while the other fourteen runners included A Shin Top (Keio Hai Nisai Stakes), Lovely Day, Gottfried and At Will. After racing in fourth place Logotype took the lead early in the straight and held off the strong late run of Codino to win by a neck with two and a half lengths back to Gottfried in third place.

In January 2013 Logotype was voted Best Two-Year-Old Colt at the JRA Awards.

=== 2013: three-year-old season ===
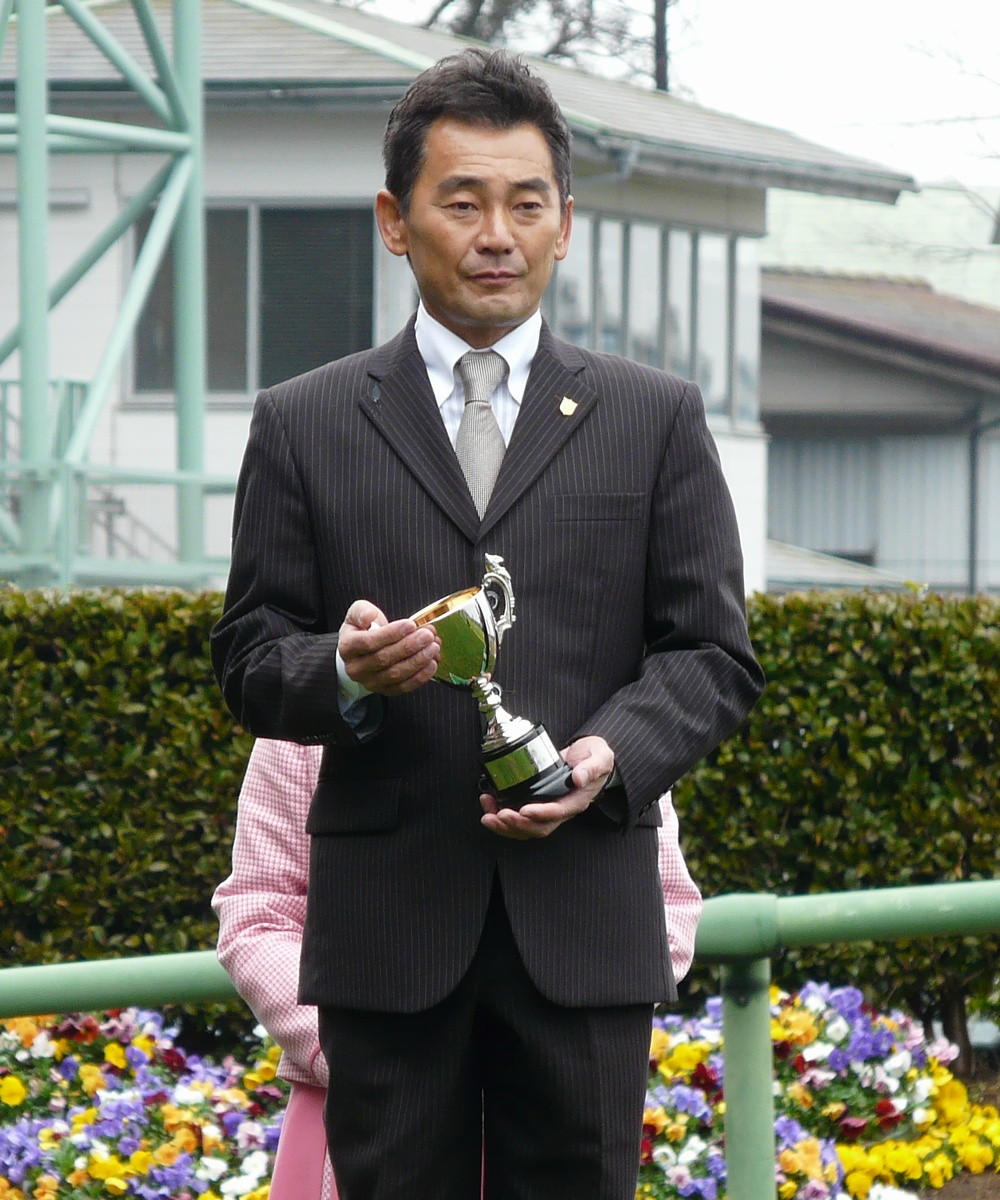
Logotype's trainer Tsuyoshi Tanaka

Logotype began his second campaign in the Grade 2 Spring Stakes (a major trial for the Satsuki Sho) over 1800 metres at Nakayama on 17 March. Ridden by Cristian Demuro he started the 2.4/1 favourite and won by one and a half lengths and a neck from Tamamo Best Play and Meiner Ho O. Four weeks later at the same track Logotype started the 2.7/1 favourite for the 73rd running of the Satsuki Sho over 2000 metres in which he was partnered by Mirco Demuro. His seventeen opponents included Epiphaneia, Codino, Tamamo Best Play, Lovely Day, Camino Tassajara (Yayoi Sho), Copano Richard, Red Ruler (Wakaba Stakes) and Fame Game (Keisei Hai). After racing in the middle of the pack he moved up on the outside on the final turn, took the lead in the straight and held off the late challenge of Epiphaneia to win by half a length. The winning time of 1:58.0 was a new record for the race.

A month after his win in the Satsuki Sho, Logotype was stepped up in distance and started the 2/1 second favourite for the Japanese Derby over 2400 metres at Tokyo. After tracking the leaders he kept on well in the straight to finish fifth behind Kizuna, Epiphaneia, Apollo Sonic and Peptide Amazon, beaten one and three quarter lengths by the winner. On his only subsequent start Logotype finished a remote fifth when favourite for the Sapporo Kinen on 18 August.

In the 2013 World's Best Racehorse Rankings Logotype was given a rating of 117, making him the 105th best racehorse in the world.

=== 2014 & 2015: four and five-year-old seasons ===
On his first run of 2014 Logotype finished third to Just A Way in the Nakayama Kinen on 2 March. Later that month he was sent to the United Arab Emirates and came home sixth behind Just A Way in the Dubai Duty Free. After returning to Japan he ran eighth to Harp Star in the Sapporo Kinen, sixth to Air Saumur in the Mainichi Okan and seventh to Danon Shark in the Mile Championship. Despite his lack of success he earned ¥15,152,000 in Japan, equivalent to approximately $135,000.

Logotype began his five-year-old season by running second to Lovely Day in the Nakayama Kimpai. After running poorly on his first race on dirt in the Negishi Stakes he returned to the turf and finished second to the filly Nuovo Record in the Nakayama Kinen before coming home fifth to Lachesis in the Osaka Hai. After the summer break he finished fourth to Shonan Pandora in the Sankei Sho All Comers, third to Danon Platina in the Fuji Stakes and ninth behind Maurice in the Mile Championship. His earnings for the year totaled ¥66,811,000 (ca. $597,000).

=== 2016: six-year-old season ===
Logotype began his 2016 campaign with a third attempt to win the Nakayama Kinen and finished seventh of the eleven runners behind Duramente. When dropped back in class for the Grade 3 Lord Derby Challenge Trophy at Nakayama on 3 April he was beaten a neck into second place by the five-year-old mare Magic Time, to whom he was conceding five kg in weight. On 5 June at Tokyo he was partnered by Hironobu Tanabe and started a 36/1 outsider for the Grade 1 Yasuda Kinen as he attempted to record his first victory in over three years. Maurice started the odds-on favorite while the other eleven runners included Real Steel, Satono Aladdin, Isla Bonita and Danon Shark. Logotype took the lead from the start and set a steady pace before accelerating in the straight to win by one and a quarter lengths from Maurice. Tsuyoshi Tanaka commented "Finally we have broken through this wall and got this Grade 1. To be honest, this victory today was unexpected so I haven’t made my plans yet."

After a four-month break Logotype returned for two races at Tokyo in October, but was unable to add to his winning tally as he finished eighth behind the filly Rouge Buck in the Mainichi Okan and fifth to Maurice in the autumn edition of the Tenno Sho. On 11 December Logotype ended his season with a trip to Hong Kong to contest the Hong Kong Mile at Sha Tin Racecourse. After tracking the leaders he stayed on well in the straight to finish fifth, beaten one and a half lengths by the winner Beauty Only.

Logotype was given a rating of 119 in the 2016 World's Best Racehorse Rankings, making him the 50th best racehorse in the world.

=== 2017: seven-year-old season ===
On 26 February 2017 Logotype ran for the fourth time in the Nakayama Kinen and finished third behind Neorealism. After a leg infection prevented him from running in the Lord Derby Challenge Trophy, Logotype attempted to repeat his 2016 success in the Yasuda Kinen on 4 June. As in the previous year he led from the start and accelerated into a clear lead in the straight. In the final strides however, he was caught by the six-year-old Satono Aladdin and beaten a neck into second place. Logotype did not race again and was retired at the end of the year.

== Racing form ==
Logotype gained 30 starts and won six of them with eight more podium finishes. This data is available in JBIS, netkeiba, Emirates Racing Authority and HKJC.

Date	Track	Race	Grade	Distance (Condition)	Entry	HN	Odds (Favored)	Finish	Time	Margins	Jockey	Winner (Runner-up)
2012 – two-year-old season
Jun 24	Hakodate	2yo Newcomer		1,200 m (Firm)	8	7	1.9 (1)	1st	1:13.1	0.0	Issei Murata	(Glamorous Glow)
Jul 14	Hakodate	Hakodate Nisai Stakes	3	1,200 m (Firm)	16	7	71.1 (14)	4th	1:10.5	0.1	Issei Murata	Stalk and Ray
Aug 4	Sapporo	Clover Sho	OP	1,500 m (Firm)	13	9	6.4 (2)	3rd	1:30.0	0.2	Issei Murata	At Will
Sep 1	Sapporo	Sapporo Nisai Stakes	3	1,800 m (Firm)	14	2	47.5 (8)	4th	1:49.2	0.7	Issei Murata	Codino
Nov 25	Tokyo	Begonia Sho	ALW (1W)	1,800 m (Firm)	16	1	5.6 (4)	1st	R1:33.6	–0.2	Mirco Demuro	(Mambo Nephew)
Dec 16	Hanshin	Asahi Hai Futurity Stakes	1	1,600 m (Firm)	16	14	34.5 (7)	1st	1:33.4	0.0	Mirco Demuro	(Codino)
2013 – three-year-old season
Mar 17	Nakayama	Spring Stakes	2	1,800 m (Firm)	16	5	3.4 (1)	1st	1:47.8	–0.2	Cristian Demuro	(Tamamo Best Play)
Apr 14	Nakayama	Satsuki Sho	1	2,000 m (Firm)	18	7	3.7 (1)	1st	R1:58.0	–0.1	Mirco Demuro	(Epiphaneia)
May 26	Tokyo	Tokyo Yushun	1	2,400 m (Firm)	18	8	3.0 (2)	5th	2:24.6	0.3	Cristian Demuro	Kizuna
Aug 18	Hakodate	Sapporo Kinen	2	2,000 m (Soft)	16	11	2.6 (1)	5th	2:08.6	2.1	Issei Murata	Tokei Halo
2014 – four-year-old season
Mar 2	Nakayama	Nakayama Kinen	2	1,800 m (Good)	15	5	6.2 (3)	3rd	1:50.4	0.6	Cristian Demuro	Just A Way
Mar 29	Meydan	Dubai Duty Free	1	1,800 m (Good)	13	12	– (6)	6th	1:48.3	2.8	Cristian Demuro	Just A Way
Aug 24	Sapporo	Sapporo Kinen	2	2,000 m (Firm)	14	1	8.6 (4)	8th	2:00.7	1.6	Issei Murata	Harp Star
Oct 12	Tokyo	Mainichi Okan	2	1,800 m (Firm)	15	14	9.5 (6)	6th	1:45.6	0.4	Kosei Miura	Air Saumur
Nov 23	Kyoto	Mile Championship	1	1,600 m (Firm)	17	10	13.4 (5)	7th	1:32.0	0.5	Christophe Lemaire	Danon Shark
2015 – five-year-old season
Jan 4	Nakayama	Nakayama Kimpai	3	2,000 m (Firm)	17	4	4.4 (1)	2nd	1:58.0	0.2	Cristian Demuro	Lovely Day
Feb 1	Tokyo	Negishi Stakes	3	1,400 m (Sloppy)	16	1	5.7 (3)	8th	1:23.9	0.5	Cristian Demuro	Air Khalifa
Mar 1	Nakayama	Nakayama Kinen	2	1,800 m (Good)	11	7	3.4 (2)	2nd	1:50.3	0.0	Cristian Demuro	Nuovo Record
Apr 5	Hanshin	Sankei Osaka Hai	2	2,000 m (Heavy)	14	9	9.7 (3)	5th	2:04.0	1.1	Yuichi Fukunaga	Lachesis
Sep 27	Nakayama	Sankei Sho All Comers	2	2,200 m (Firm)	15	6	4.1 (2)	4th	2:12.5	0.5	Mirco Demuro	Shonan Pandora
Oct 24	Tokyo	Fuji Stakes	3	1,600 m (Firm)	16	14	9.5 (3)	3rd	1:32.9	0.2	Mirco Demuro	Danon Platina
Nov 22	Kyoto	Mile Championship	1	1,600 m (Firm)	18	17	24.0 (8)	9th	1:33.4	0.6	Suguru Hamanaka	Maurice
2016 – six-year-old season
Feb 28	Nakayama	Nakayama Kinen	2	1,800 m (Firm)	11	3	9.9 (5)	7th	1:46.6	0.7	Hironobu Tanabe	Duramente
Apr 3	Nakayama	Lord Derby Challenge Trophy	3	1,600 m (Firm)	16	14	10.7 (4)	2nd	1:32.8	0.0	Hironobu Tanabe	Magic Time
Jun 5	Tokyo	Yasuda Kinen	1	1,600 m (Firm)	12	6	36.9 (8)	1st	1:33.0	–0.2	Hironobu Tanabe	(Maurice)
Oct 9	Tokyo	Mainichi Okan	2	1,800 m (Good)	12	9	8.1 (5)	8th	1:47.6	1.0	Hironobu Tanabe	Rouge Buck
Oct 30	Tokyo	Tenno Sho (Autumn)	1	2,000 m (Firm)	15	5	43.2 (9)	5th	1:59.9	0.6	Hironobu Tanabe	Maurice
Dec 11	Sha Tin	Hong Kong Mile	1	1,600 m (Good)	14	3	6.7 (5)	5th	1:33.7	0.2	Mirco Demuro	Beauty Only
2017 – seven-year-old season
Feb 28	Nakayama	Nakayama Kinen	2	1,800 m (Firm)	11	9	15.2 (7)	3rd	1:47.8	0.2	Hironobu Tanabe	Neorealism
Jun 4	Tokyo	Yasuda Kinen	1	1,600 m (Firm)	18	16	14.6 (8)	2nd	1:31.5	0.0	Hironobu Tanabe	Satono Aladdin

Legend:
Turf Dirt

- R indicated that it was a record time finish

== Stud record ==
After the end of his racing career, Logotype became a breeding stallion at the Shadai Stallion Station in Abira, Hokkaido. In 2023, he was moved to Lex Stud in Shinhidaka, Hokkaido.

=== Notable progeny ===
The data below is based on JBIS Stallion Reports.

c = colt, f = filly, g = gelding

bold = grade 1 stakes

**Foaled**	**Name**	**Sex**	**Major Wins**
2020	Mitono O	c	Hyogo Championship, Heian Stakes

== In popular culture ==
An anthropomorphized version of Logotype appears in Umamusume: Pretty Derby, voiced by Misora Takahashi.

== Pedigree ==
Pedigree of Logotype (JPN), brown colt 2010
Sire Lohengrin (JPN) 1999	Singspiel (IRE); 1992	In The Wings (GB)	Sadler's Wells (USA)
Sire Lohengrin (JPN) 1999	Singspiel (IRE); 1992	In The Wings (GB)	High Hawk (IRE)
Sire Lohengrin (JPN) 1999	Singspiel (IRE); 1992	Glorious Song (CAN)	**Halo** (USA)
Sire Lohengrin (JPN) 1999	Singspiel (IRE); 1992	Glorious Song (CAN)	Ballade (USA)
Sire Lohengrin (JPN) 1999	Carling (FR); 1992	Garde Royale (IRE)	Mill Reef (USA)
Sire Lohengrin (JPN) 1999	Carling (FR); 1992	Garde Royale (IRE)	Royal Way (FR)
Sire Lohengrin (JPN) 1999	Carling (FR); 1992	Corraleja	Carvin
Sire Lohengrin (JPN) 1999	Carling (FR); 1992	Corraleja	Darling Dale (IRE)
Dam Stereotype (JPN) 2002	Sunday Silence (USA); 1986	**Halo**	Hail to Reason
Dam Stereotype (JPN) 2002	Sunday Silence (USA); 1986	**Halo**	Cosmah
Dam Stereotype (JPN) 2002	Sunday Silence (USA); 1986	Wishing Well	Understanding
Dam Stereotype (JPN) 2002	Sunday Silence (USA); 1986	Wishing Well	Mountain Flower
Dam Stereotype (JPN) 2002	Star Ballerina; 1990	Risen Star (USA)	Secretariat (USA)
Dam Stereotype (JPN) 2002	Star Ballerina; 1990	Risen Star (USA)	Ribbon
Dam Stereotype (JPN) 2002	Star Ballerina; 1990	Berliani (USA)	Nureyev
Dam Stereotype (JPN) 2002	Star Ballerina; 1990	Berliani (USA)	Eleven Pleaures (Family: 8-k)

- Logotype was inbred 3 × 4 to Halo, meaning that this stallion appears in both the third and fourth generations of his pedigree.
