= Real Steel (horse) =

Japanese-bred Thoroughbred racehorse

Real Steel リアルスティール
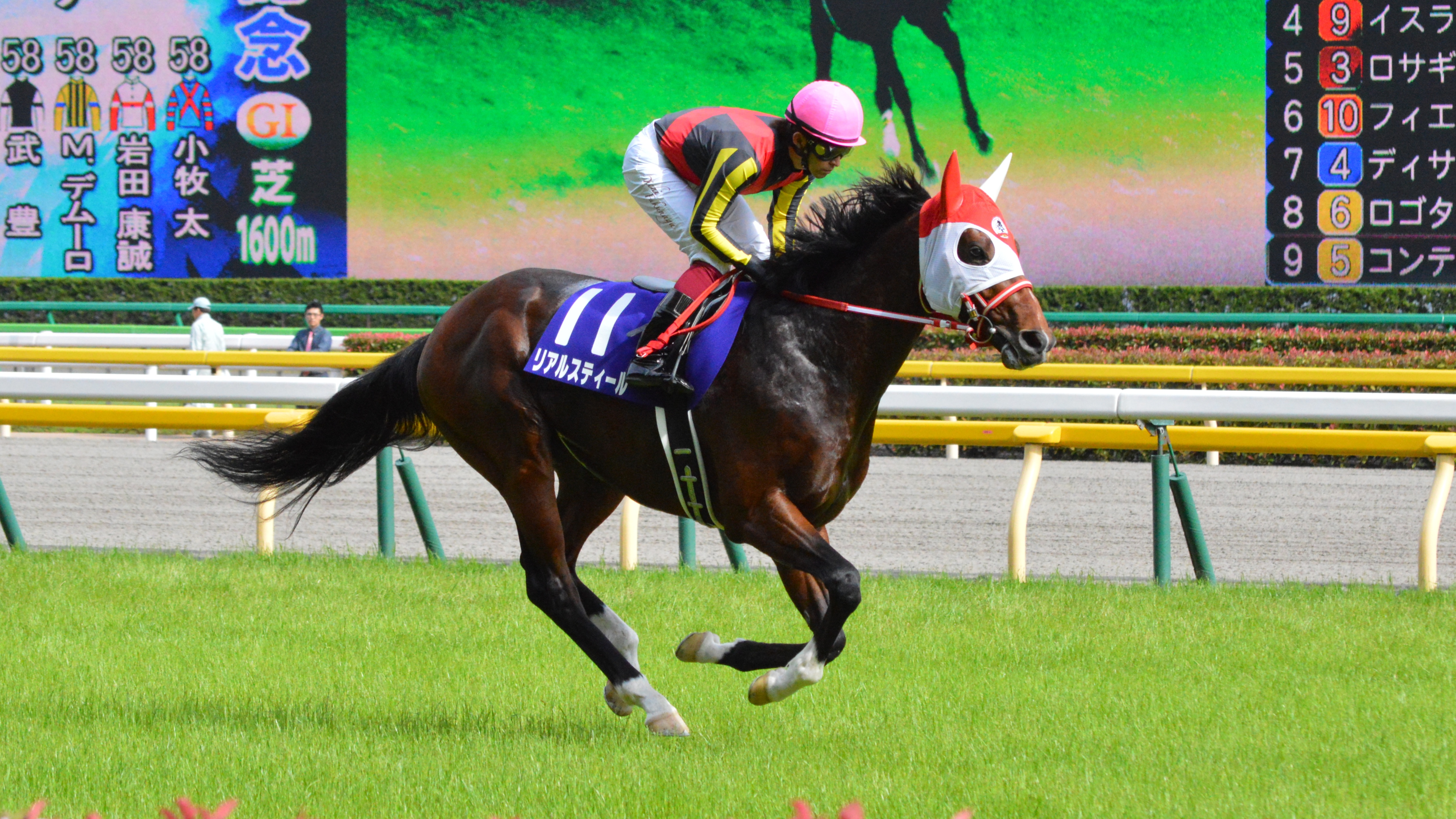
- Real Steel in 2016
- Sire: Deep Impact
- Grandsire: Sunday Silence
- Dam: Loves Only Me
- Damsire: Storm Cat
- Sex: Stallion
- Foaled: 1 March 2012
- Country: Japan
- Colour: Bay
- Breeder: Northern Farm
- Owner: Sunday Racing
- Racing colours
- Trainer: Yoshito Yahagi
- Jockey: Yuichi Fukunaga; Ryan Moore
- Record: 17: 4-5-2
- Earnings: 900,792,300 JPY

Major wins
- Kyodo Tsushin Hai (2015); Dubai Turf (2016); Mainichi Okan (2017)

Real Steel (Japanese: リアルスティール, Hepburn: Riaru Sutīru; foaled 1 March 2012) is a Japanese Thoroughbred racehorse and sire. After winning his only race as a juvenile in 2014, he developed into a top-class performer in the following year when he won the Kyodo Tsushin Hai and finished second in the Spring Stakes, Satsuki Sho, St Lite Kinen, and Kikuka Sho as well as running fourth in the Japanese Derby. He reached his peak as a four-year-old in 2016 when he won the Dubai Turf and ran second in the Tenno Sho. He remained in training for two more years, winning the Mainichi Okan in 2017 and running third in the 2018 Dubai Turf.

Real Steel is named after the 2011 film of the same name.

== Background ==
Real Steel is a bay horse standing 1.67 metres high, with a white star and four white socks bred in Hokkaido, Japan by Northern Farm. During his racing career he was owned by Sunday Racing and trained by Yoshito Yahagi.

He was from the fifth crop of foals sired by Deep Impact, who was the Japanese Horse of the Year in 2005 and 2006, winning races including the Tokyo Yushun, Tenno Sho, Arima Kinen and Japan Cup. Deep Impact's other progeny include Gentildonna, Harp Star, Kizuna, A Shin Hikari, Marialite and Saxon Warrior. Real Steel's dam Loves Only Me, a half-sister to Rumplestiltskin, was trained in Ireland but never raced and was exported to Japan after being sold for $900,000 at Keeneland in November 2009. She was a granddaughter of the outstanding racehorse and broodmare Miesque. Loves Only Me has also produced Real Steel's full sister Loves Only You, winner of the Yushun Himba, Queen Elizabeth II Cup, the Breeders' Cup Filly & Mare Turf and the Hong Kong Cup.

== Racing career ==
=== 2014: two-year-old season ===
Real Steel began his racing career on 27 December 2014 when he contested an event for previously unraced juveniles over 1800 metres at Hanshin Racecourse. Running on firm ground he won by more than three lengths from Liberator.

=== 2015: three-year-old season ===
For his three-year-old debut Real Steel was stepped up in class to contest the Grade 3 Kyodo Tsushin Hai (a trial race for the Satsuki Sho) over 1800 metres at Tokyo Racecourse on 15 February and started the 5.1/1 second favourite behind Sunday Racing's other runner Duramente. Ridden as in all of his races that year by Yuichi Fukunaga he won by half a length from Duramente with Ambitious in third place. Five weeks later at Nakayama Racecourse the colt started favourite for the Spring Stakes but in a slowly run race he was beaten a neck by Kitasan Black with third place going to Danon Platina. In the Satsuki Sho over 2000 metres at Nakayama on 19 April Real Steel briefly took the lead in the straight before being overtaken and finishing second to Duramente with Kitasan Black in third and the favoured Satono Crown coming home sixth. The colt was then stepped up in distance for the 82nd running of the Tokyo Yushun over 2400 metres at Tokyo on 31 May in which he started second favourite and came home fourth behind Duramente, Satono Rasen and Satono Crown.

After a break of almost four months, Real Steel returned on 27 September for the Kobe Shimbun Hai (a trial race for the Kikuka Sho) over 2400 metres at Hanshin. Starting the odds-on favourite he raced in mid-division before finishing strongly but was unable to catch Lia Fail and was beaten two lengths into second place. On 25 October the colt was made second favourite for the Kikuka Sho over 3000 metres at Kyoto Racecourse. After tracking the leading group he moved into contention entering the straight but despite producing an "impressive kick" in the last 200 metres he failed by a neck to overhaul Kitasan Black.

In the 2015 World's Best Racehorse Rankings Real Steel was given a rating of 116, making him the 139th best racehorse in the world.

=== 2016: four-year-old season ===
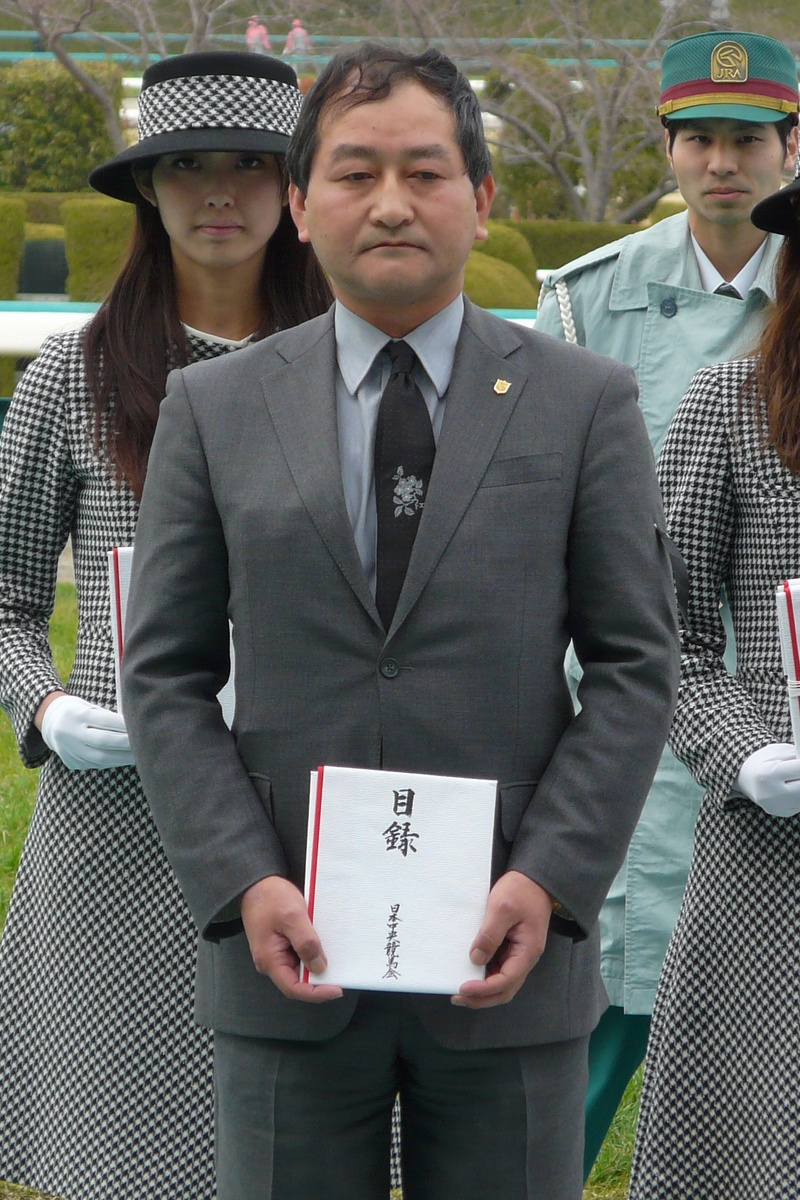
Real Steel's trainer Yoshito Yahagi

Real Steel began his third campaign on 28 February 2016 when he finished a close third behind Duramente and Ambitious in the Grade 2 Nakayama Kinen over 1800 metres with the unplaced runners including Logotype and Isla Bonita. The colt was then sent to the United Arab Emirates to contest the Dubai Turf on 26 March at Meydan Racecourse. Ridden by Ryan Moore he started at odds of 8/1 in an international field of fifteen runners. Godolphin's Jebel Hatta winner Tryster went off favourite, while the other contenders included Intilaaq (Rose of Lancaster Stakes), Very Special (Balanchine), Forries Waltz (Al Rashidiya), The Corsican (Arc Trial), Euro Charline (Beverly D. Stakes), Ertijaal (Cape Derby) and Flamboyant (San Marcos Stakes). Real Steel tracked the leaders on the outside as the 66/1 outsider Ghaamer set the early pace. Very Special went to the front 600 metres from the finish but Real Steel gained the advantage 200 metres out and kept on well to win by half a length from Euro Charline. Real Steel's trainer Yoshito Yahagi said after the race "I am elated and speechless. I am blessed with this horse and the people around me who have supported him". Ryan Moore commented "He's a beautiful horse, he's got lots of quality. It was a big effort from the horse, he had a tough trip and was out wide but has toughed it out. He never runs a bad race. He's a very brave horse and has had to do it the hard way".

On his return to Japan, Real Steel was dropped back in distance for the Grade 1 Yasuda Kinen over 1600 metres in which he started the second favourite but was outpaced in the straight and came home eleventh of the twelve runners, six lengths behind the winner Logotype. After a four and a half month summer break the colt returned for the autumn edition of the Tenno Sho over 2000 metres at Tokyo. Ridden by Mirco Demuro he came from the rear of the field with a late run on the outside to take second place, one and a half lengths behind the winner Maurice. On his final start of the year, Real Steel was made the 3.2/1 second favourite for the Japan Cup over 2400 metres at Tokyo on 27 November. After tracking the leaders he kept on well in the straight without looking likely to win and came home fifth of the seventeen runners behind Kitasan Black, Sounds of Earth, Cheval Grand and Gold Actor.

In the 2016 World's Best Racehorse Rankings Real Steel was ranked the 34th best racehorse in the world with a rating of 120.

=== 2017: five-year-old season ===
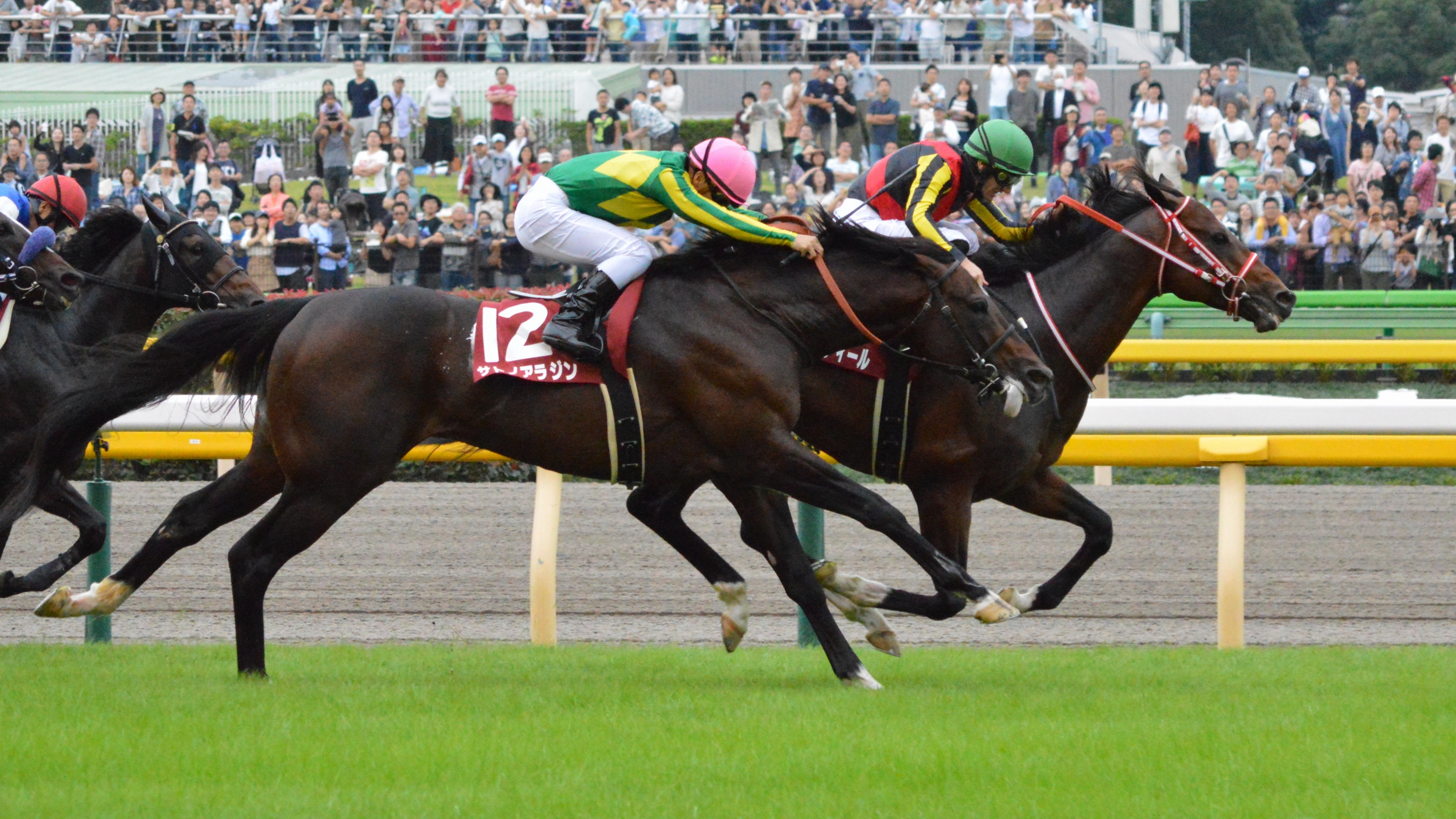
Real Steel wins the 2017 Mainichi Okan

Real Steel began his 2017 season in the Nakayama Kinen, as in the previous year, but on this occasion he ran poorly and came home eighth of the eleven runners behind Neorealism. He was expected to defend the Dubai Turf on 25 March but was withdrawn from the race when he bled from his nostrils after a training gallop.

He was off the track for over seven months before making his comeback in the Mainichi Okan over 1800 metres at Tokyo on 8 October. Ridden by Mirco Demuro he was made the 4.8/1 third choice in the betting behind Soul Stirring and Makahiki in a twelve-runner field which also included Satono Aladdin (Yasuda Kinen) and One And Only (Tokyo Yushun). After racing in mid-division on the outside he made steady progress in the straight, took the lead 100 metres from the finish and held off the late challenge of Satono Aladdin to win by a neck. Three weeks later he contested the autumn running of the Tenno Sho for the second time and finished fourth behind Kitasan Black, Satono Crown and Rainbow Line.

Real Steel finished 129th 2017 World's Best Racehorse Rankings with a rating of 117.

=== 2018: six-year-old season ===
On his first appearance of 2018, Real Steel was sent back to Dubai in an attempt to repeat his 2016 victory in the Dubai Turf and started at odds of 10/1 in a 15-runner field. Partnered by Mickael Barzalona he stayed on strongly in the closing stages to dead heat with Deirdre for third place behind Benbatl and Vivlos. Barzalona said "He turned in a good race, but he just didn't have enough." In his second attempt to win the Yasuda Kinen on 3 June, Real Steel failed to reproduce his best form and trailed home towards the rear of the sixteen-runner field. He was retired shortly after the race when he sustained a torn ligament in his right foreleg.

Real Steel's mark of 116 placed him 163rd in the 2018 World's Best Racehorse Rankings with a rating of 117.

== Racing form ==
Real Steel won four races out of 17 starts. This data is available based on JBIS, netkeiba and racingpost.

Date	Race	Grade	Distance	Surface	Track	Entry	Finish	Time	Margin	Jockey	Winner (Runner-up)
2014 – two-year-old season
Dec 27	2yo Newcomer		1800m	Turf	Hanshin	9	1st	1:50.8	–0.6	Yuichi Fukunaga	(Liberator)
2015 – three-year-old season
Feb 15	Kyodo News Service Hai	3	1800m	Turf	Tokyo	12	1st	1:47.1	–0.1	Yuichi Fukunaga	(Duramente)
Mar 22	Spring Stakes	2	1800m	Turf	Nakayama	12	2nd	1:49.1	0.0	Yuichi Fukunaga	Kitasan Black
Apr 19	Satsuki Sho	1	2000m	Turf	Nakayama	15	2nd	1:58.4	0.2	Yuichi Fukunaga	Duramente
May 31	Tokyo Yushun	1	2400m	Turf	Tokyo	18	4th	2:23.8	0.6	Yuichi Fukunaga	Duramente
Sep 27	Kobe Shimbun Hai	2	2400m	Turf	Hanshin	15	2nd	2:27.0	0.3	Yuichi Fukunaga	Lia Fall
Oct 25	Kikuka Sho	1	3000m	Turf	Kyoto	18	2nd	3:03.9	0.0	Yuichi Fukunaga	Kitasan Black
2016 – four-year-old season
Feb 28	Nakayama Kinen	2	1800m	Turf	Nakayama	11	3rd	1:46.0	0.1	Yuichi Fukunaga	Duramente
Mar 26	Dubai Turf	1	1800m	Turf	Meydan	15	1st	1:47.1	–0.1	Ryan Moore	(Euro Charline)
Jun 5	Yasuda Kinen	1	1600m	Turf	Tokyo	12	11th	1:34.0	1.0	Yuichi Fukunaga	Logotype
Oct 30	Tenno Sho (Autumn)	1	2000m	Turf	Tokyo	15	2nd	1:59.5	0.2	Mirco Demuro	Maurice
Nov 27	Japan Cup	1	2400m	Turf	Tokyo	17	5th	2:26.4	0.6	Ryan Moore	Kitasan Black
2017 – five-year-old season
Feb 27	Nakayama Kinen	2	1800m	Turf	Nakayama	11	8th	1:48.3	0.7	Keita Tosaki	Neorealism
Oct 8	Mainichi Okan	2	1800m	Turf	Tokyo	12	1st	1:45.6	0.0	Mirco Demuro	Satono Aladdin
Oct 29	Tenno Sho (Autumn)	1	2000m	Turf	Tokyo	18	4th	2:09.5	1.2	Vincent Cheminaud	Kitasan Black
2018 – six-year-old season
Mar 31	Dubai Turf	1	1800m	Turf	Meydan	15	3rd	1:46.7	0.7	Mickael Barzalona	Benbatl
Jun 3	Yasuda Kinen	1	1600m	Turf	Tokyo	16	15th	1:32.7	1.4	Yasunari Iwata	Mozu Ascot

== Stud record ==
Real Steel was retired from racing to become a breeding stallion at the Shadai Stallion Station. He was moved to Breeders' Stallion Station in 2024 and was immediately fully booked after his offspring performed well late in 2023.

Real Steel has produced four graded race winners; All Parfait (2022 Daily Hai Nisai Stakes), Lebensstil (2023 St Lite Kinen), Chikappa (Hokkaido Sprint Cup), and Forever Young (Saudi Derby, UAE Derby, Tokyo Daishoten, Saudi Cup, Breeders' Cup Classic, and Jockey Club Gold Cup), with the latter becoming the first Japanese-born and -trained horse to win the Breeders' Cup Classic.

=== Notable progeny ===
Below data is based on JBIS Stallion Reports.

c = colt, f = filly
bold = grade 1 stakes

**Foaled**	**Name**	**Sex**	**Major Wins**
2020	All Parfait	f	Daily Hai Nisai Stakes
2020	Lebensstil	c	St Lite Kinen, Epsom Cup, Sankei Sho All Comers, Mainichi Ōkan, Nakayama Kinen
2020	Scheelite	g	Shaftesbury Avenue Handicap
2021	Chikappa	c	Hokkaido Sprint Cup, Tokyo Hai
2021	Forever Young	c	JBC Nisai Yushun, Zen-Nippon Nisai Yushun, Saudi Derby, UAE Derby, Japan Dirt Classic, **Tokyo Daishōten**, **Saudi Cup** (twice), Nippon TV Hai, **Breeders' Cup Classic**, **Jockey Club Gold Cup**
2021	Veloce Era	c	Hakodate Kinen
2021	Family Time	c	Copa Republica Argentina
2022	Canal Beagle	c	Unicorn Stakes
2023	Admire Quads	c	Daily Hai Nisai Stakes

== Pedigree ==
Pedigree of Real Steel (JPN), bay stallion 2012
Sire Deep Impact (JPN) 2002	Sunday Silence (USA); 1986	Halo	Hail to Reason
Sire Deep Impact (JPN) 2002	Sunday Silence (USA); 1986	Halo	Cosmah
Sire Deep Impact (JPN) 2002	Sunday Silence (USA); 1986	Wishing Well	Understanding
Sire Deep Impact (JPN) 2002	Sunday Silence (USA); 1986	Wishing Well	Mountain Flower
Sire Deep Impact (JPN) 2002	Wind in Her Hair (IRE); 1991	Alzao (USA)	Lyphard
Sire Deep Impact (JPN) 2002	Wind in Her Hair (IRE); 1991	Alzao (USA)	Lady Rebecca (GB)
Sire Deep Impact (JPN) 2002	Wind in Her Hair (IRE); 1991	Burghclere (GB)	Busted
Sire Deep Impact (JPN) 2002	Wind in Her Hair (IRE); 1991	Burghclere (GB)	Highclere
Dam Loves Only Me (USA) 2006	Storm Cat; 1983	Storm Bird (CAN)	Northern Dancer
Dam Loves Only Me (USA) 2006	Storm Cat; 1983	Storm Bird (CAN)	South Ocean
Dam Loves Only Me (USA) 2006	Storm Cat; 1983	Terlingua	Secretariat
Dam Loves Only Me (USA) 2006	Storm Cat; 1983	Terlingua	Crimson Saint
Dam Loves Only Me (USA) 2006	Monevassia; 1994	Mr. Prospector	Raise a Native
Dam Loves Only Me (USA) 2006	Monevassia; 1994	Mr. Prospector	Gold Digger
Dam Loves Only Me (USA) 2006	Monevassia; 1994	Miesque	Nureyev
Dam Loves Only Me (USA) 2006	Monevassia; 1994	Miesque	Pasadoble (Family: 20)

- Real Steel is 4x5x5 inbred to Northern Dancer, meaning that Northern Dancer appears once in the fourth generation of his pedigree and twice in the fifth.
