= Admire Zoom =

Japanese-bred Thoroughbred racehorse

Admire Zoom アドマイヤズーム
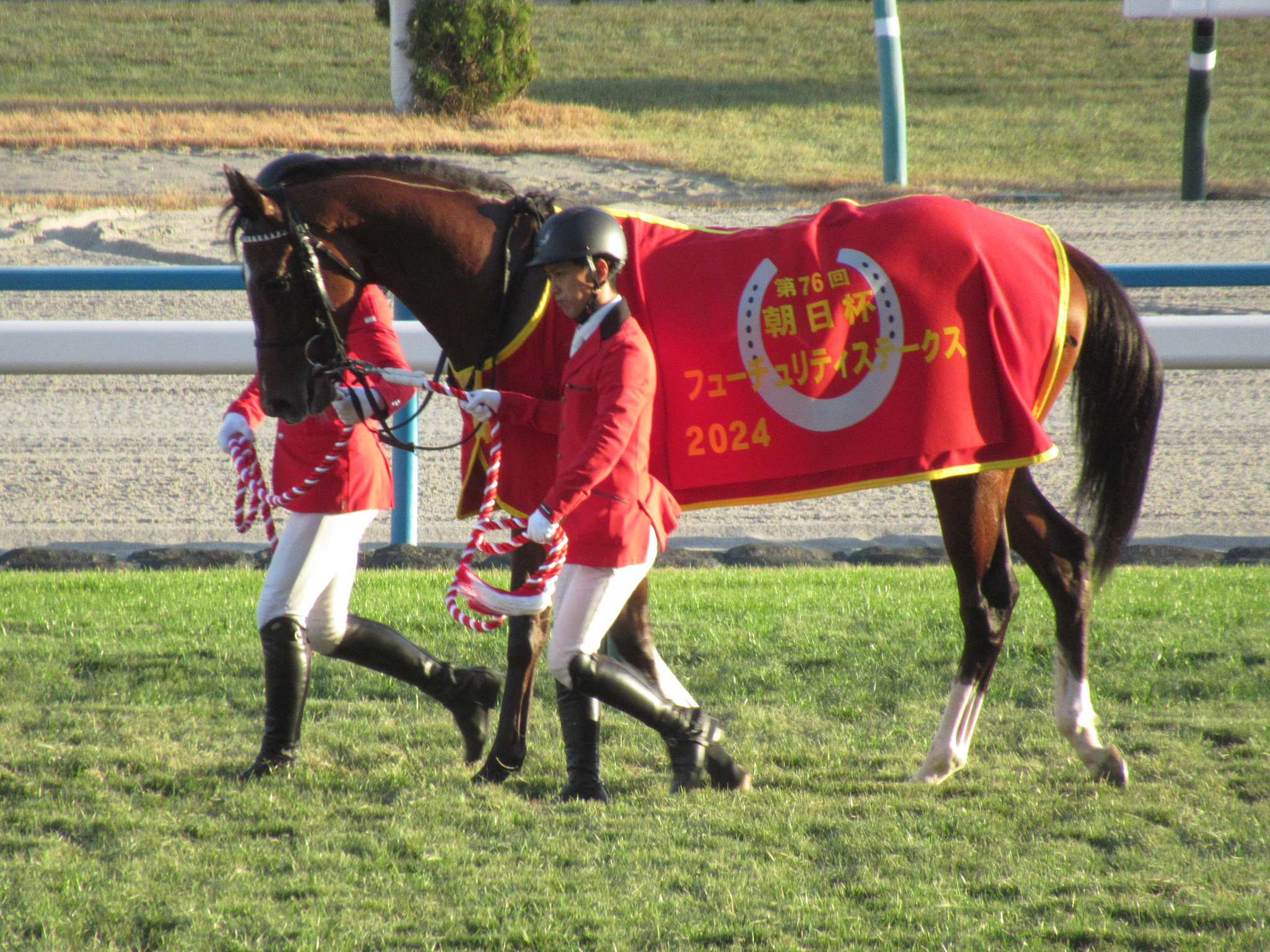
- Admire Zoom after winning the Asahi Hai Futurity Stakes in 2024
- Breed: Thoroughbred
- Sire: Maurice
- Grandsire: Screen Hero
- Dam: Daiwa Zoom
- Damsire: Heart's Cry
- Sex: Colt
- Foaled: 28 February 2022 (age 4)
- Country: Japan
- Color: Bay
- Breeder: Shadai Farm
- Owner: Junko Kondo
- Racing colors
- Trainer: Yasuo Tomomichi
- Jockey: Yuga Kawada; Yutaka Take
- Record: 9: 3-1-0
- Earnings: ¥160,320,000

Major wins
- Asahi Hai Futurity Stakes (2024); Yomiuri Milers Cup (2026)
- Last updated on November 22, 2026

Admire Zoom (Japanese: アドマイヤズーム, Hepburn: Adomaiya Zūmu; foaled 28 February 2022) is an active Japanese Thoroughbred racehorse. As a two year-old, he won the Asahi Hai Futurity Stakes.

== Background ==
Born on February 28, 2022, Admire Zoom was sired by Maurice, a multi-award-winning Japanese racehorse who was also the sire of Jack d'Or, Geraldina, and Pixie Knight. His dam, Daiwa Zoom, was sired by Heart's Cry, the horse who defeated Deep Impact in the 2005 Arima Kinen.

He was purchased for ¥115,000,000 as a yearling in the 2023 JRHA Select Sale.

== Racing career ==
=== 2024: two-year-old season ===
On October 5, Admire Zoom made his debut race on the Kyoto Racecourse where he was the favorite horse. Ridden by Yuga Kawada, he only finished in fourth place. Because of this, he had to compete in a maiden race, but this time, he finally won by three lengths over the second place. His next race was the Asahi Hai Futurity Stakes, where he was the fifth favorite horse with an odds of 9.1. With a slow pace, he maintained his position in second place and surged early in the homestretch until he overtook Daishin Ra, making it his first G1 victory. After the race, his trainer, Yasuo Tomomichi commented, “He tends to get overexcited on a daily basis, but we were able to push him hard in preparation for this race. His response after being urged on in the novice race was impressive, and his ability to sustain his speed for a long distance is a key strength. The way he powered ahead in the homestretch was truly remarkable. I think we will remain him in mile races. We’ll discuss it with the owner, but our target for next spring is the NHK Mile Cup”.

=== 2025: three-year-old season ===
In his second season, he started by running in New Zealand Trophy on April 12. Unfortunately, he was not able to catch up to Immigrant Song, causing him to end up finishing in second. At the NHK Mile Cup, he was the favorite horse, though he disappointingly finished in 14th place which majorly contributed to his running affected by a lost shoe. His last race for that season was the Swan Stakes, where he placed in sixth among 18 runners.

=== 2026: four-year-old season ===
For his comeback in this year, he started at the Yomiuri Milers Cup. His jockey for the day would be Yutaka Take. When the race began, Admire Zoom ran well on the second position for most of the race before he accelerated to overtook the front running Shonan Addeybb, to win the race by half a length over the second place finisher, Dragon Boost. In the post race, Take smiled and said, "First of all, I'm relieved. Since it was my first time riding him, I had anticipated a lot of things, but he had a good start and was very easy to ride. I've thought he was a strong horse since we raced together, and I was given a great opportunity, so I wanted to respond with a result."

Following the Yomiuri Milers Cup, Admire Zoom was scheduled to race the Yasuda Kinen with Take as his jockey, but was scratched a few days prior due to a damage in his right forearm's nail. Take would go on to ride Sixpence instead, who would win that race. In the autumn, the horse made a return with Take at the mile race of Fuji Stakes in October. The training went well, as the trainers said the horse had gained more muscle and was maturing into a proper racehorse in the final workout. Running as the third favourite, the horse made an early impression with his run but faltered at the long final straight of the racecourse and finished in sixth place behind the winner, Sugar Kun. In the post race, Take deduced that the horse had a smooth start, but lacked the needed gear in the final phase and the track conditions for the day did not favour him.

== Racing Record ==
The data shown below is available from netkeiba and JBIS.

Date	Track	Race	Grade	Distance (Condition)	Bracket (Position)	Entry	Odds (Favored)	Finish	Time	Margin	Jockey	Winner (Runner-up)
2024 – two-year-old season
Oct 5	Kyoto	2YO DBT		1600m (Firm)	2 (3)	15	2.7 (1)	4th	1:34.7	0.3	Yuga Kawada	Theresa
Nov 10	Kyoto	2YO Maiden		1600m (Firm)	5 (8)	14	3.8 (2)	1st	1:33.9	-0.5	Yuga Kawada	(All The Rage)
Dec 15	Kyoto	Asahi Hai Futurity Stakes	G1	1600m (Firm)	1 (2)	16	9.1 (5)	1st	1;34.1	-0.4	Yuga Kawada	(Museum Mile)
2025 – three-year-old season
Apr 12	Nakayama	New Zealand Trophy	G2	1600m (Firm)	5 (7)	14	1.7 (1)	2nd	1:32.4	0.0	Yuga Kawada	Immigrant Song
May 11	Tokyo	NHK Mile Cup	G1	1600m (Firm)	4 (8)	18	2.5 (1)	14th	1:32.7	1.0	Yuga Kawada	Panja Tower
Oct 13	Kyoto	Swan Stakes	G2	1400m (Firm)	7 (14)	18	4.7 (2)	6th	1:19.1	0.2	Ryusei Sakai	Off Trail
2026 – four-year-old season
Apr 26	Kyoto	Yomiuri Milers Cup	G2	1600m (Firm)	5 (9)	18	4.1 (1)	1st	1:31.7	-0.1	Yutaka Take	(Dragon Boost)
Oct 17	Tokyo	Fuji Stakes	G2	1600m (Firm)	4 (5)	14	5.9 (3)	6th	1:32.8	0.6	Yutaka Take	Sugar Kun
Nov 22	Kyoto	Mile Championship	G1	1600m (Firm)	3 (5)	18	8.3 (5)	16th	1:32.7	0.9	Yutaka Take	Erdenali

Dirt

== Pedigree ==
Pedigree of Admire Zoom, bay horse, foaled 28 February 2022
Sire Maurice b. 2011 (JPN)	Screen Hero ch. 2004 (JPN)	Grass Wonder (USA)	Silver Hawk (USA)
Sire Maurice b. 2011 (JPN)	Screen Hero ch. 2004 (JPN)	Grass Wonder (USA)	Ameriflora (USA)
Sire Maurice b. 2011 (JPN)	Screen Hero ch. 2004 (JPN)	Running Heroine (JPN)	Sunday Silence (USA)
Sire Maurice b. 2011 (JPN)	Screen Hero ch. 2004 (JPN)	Running Heroine (JPN)	Dyna Actress (JPN)
Sire Maurice b. 2011 (JPN)	Mejiro Frances b. 2001 (JPN)	Carnegie (IRE)	Sadler's Wells (USA)
Sire Maurice b. 2011 (JPN)	Mejiro Frances b. 2001 (JPN)	Carnegie (IRE)	Detroit (FR)
Sire Maurice b. 2011 (JPN)	Mejiro Frances b. 2001 (JPN)	Mejiro Monterey (JPN)	Mogami (FR)
Sire Maurice b. 2011 (JPN)	Mejiro Frances b. 2001 (JPN)	Mejiro Monterey (JPN)	Mejiro Quincey (JPN)
Dam Daiwa Zoom ch. 2009 (JPN)	Heart's Cry b. 2001 (JPN)	Sunday Silence (USA)	Halo (USA)
Dam Daiwa Zoom ch. 2009 (JPN)	Heart's Cry b. 2001 (JPN)	Sunday Silence (USA)	Wishing Well (USA)
Dam Daiwa Zoom ch. 2009 (JPN)	Heart's Cry b. 2001 (JPN)	Irish Dance (JPN)	Tony Bin (IRE)
Dam Daiwa Zoom ch. 2009 (JPN)	Heart's Cry b. 2001 (JPN)	Irish Dance (JPN)	Buper Dance (USA)
Dam Daiwa Zoom ch. 2009 (JPN)	Fornalina b. 1996 (JPN)	Capote (USA)	Seattle Slew (USA)
Dam Daiwa Zoom ch. 2009 (JPN)	Fornalina b. 1996 (JPN)	Capote (USA)	Too Bald (USA)
Dam Daiwa Zoom ch. 2009 (JPN)	Fornalina b. 1996 (JPN)	Prayer Wheel (CAN)	Conquistador Cielo (USA)
Dam Daiwa Zoom ch. 2009 (JPN)	Fornalina b. 1996 (JPN)	Prayer Wheel (CAN)	Halo Reply (CAN) (Family: 4-g)
