= JRA Award for Best Two-Year-Old Colt =

Japanese thoroughbred horse racing award

The JRA Award for Best Two-Year-Old Colt is a title awarded annually by the Japan Racing Association (JRA) to the outstanding horse of that category in Thoroughbred horse racing in Japan. Since 1987 the honor has been part of the JRA Awards.

== Winners ==
Year	Horse	Trainer	Owner
1987	Soccer Boy	Koji Ono	Shadai Racing
1988	Sakura Hokuto O	Katsutaro Sakai	Sakura Commerce
1989	Ines Fujin	Osamu Kato Hajime	Masaaki Kobayashi
1990	Lindo Shaver	Takaaki Motoishi	Delmar Club
1991	Mihono Bourbon	Toyama Tameo	Mihono International
1992	L-Way Win	Noriaki Tsubo	Takao Zako
1993	Narita Brian	Masaaki Ookubo	Hidenori Yamaji
1994	Fuji Kiseki	Sakae Watanabe	Tsukasa Saito
1995	Bubble Gum Fellow	Kazuo Fujisawa	Shadai Racing
1996	Meiner Max	Hitoshi Nakamura	Thoroughbred Club Ruffian Co Ltd
1997	Grass Wonder	Mitsuhiro Ogata	Y. Hanzawa
1998	Admire Cozzene	Mitsuru Hashida	Riichi Kondo
1999	Eishin Preston	Shuji Kitahashi	Toyomitsu Hirai
2000	Mejiro Bailey	Kohei Take	Mejiro Shoji Co Ltd
2001	Admire Don	Hiroyoshi Matsuda	Riichi Kondo
2002	Eishin Champ	Tsumoto Setoguchi	Toyomitsu Hirai
2003	Cosmo Sunbeam	Shozo Sasaki	Misako Okada
2004	Meiner Recolte	Masahiro Horii	K Thoroughbred Club Ruffian
2005	Fusaichi Richard	Kunihide Matsuda	Fusao Sekiguchi
2006	Dream Journey	Yasutoshi Ikee	Sunday Racing
2007	Goshawk Ken	Makoto Saito	Yoshio Fujita
2008	Seiun Wonder	Masazo Ryoke	Takao Otani
2009	Rose Kingdom	Kojiro Hashiguchi	Sunday Racing
2010	Grand Prix Boss	Yoshito Yahagi	Grand Prix Co. Ltd.
2011	Alfredo	Takahisa Tezuka	Carrot Farm
2012	Logotype	Tsuyoshi Tanaka	Teruya Yoshida
2013	Asia Express	Takahisa Tezuka	Yukio Baba
2014	Danon Platina	Sakae Kunieda	Danox Co Ltd
2015	Leontes	Katsuhiko Sumii	Carrot Farm
2016	Satono Ares	Kazuo Fujisawa	Hajime Satomi
2017	Danon Premium	Mitsumasa Nakauchida	Danox Co Ltd
2018	Admire Mars	Yasuo Tomomichi	Toshikazu Kondo
2019	Contrail	Yoshito Yahagi	Shinji Maeda
2020	Danon The Kid	Takayuki Yasuda	Danox Co Ltd
2021	Do Deuce	Yasuo Tomomichi	Kieffers Co. Ltd.
2022	Dolce More	Naosuke Sugai	Three H Racing
2023	Jantar Mantar	Tomokazu Takano	Shadai Racing
2024	Croix du Nord	Takashi Saito	Sunday Racing
2025	Cavallerizzo	Tatsuya Yoshioka	Silk Racing Co. Ltd.
