= Asahi Hai Futurity Stakes =

Asahi Hai Futurity Stakes 朝日杯フューチュリティステークス
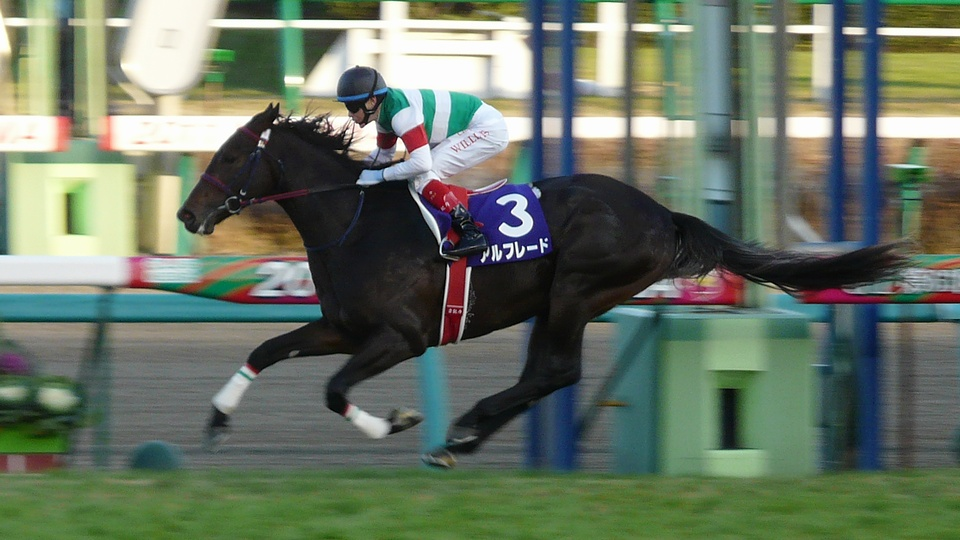
- The 63rd (2011) winner Alfredo
- Class: Grade 1
- Location: Hanshin Racecourse; Takarazuka, Hyogo, Japan
- Inaugurated: December 3, 1949
- Race type: Thoroughbred - Flat racing

Race information
- Distance: 1,600 meters (about 8 furlongs / one mile)
- Surface: Turf
- Track: Right-handed (outer course)
- Qualification: Two-year-old Colts & Fillies, no Geldings
- Weight: Colt 56 kg, Filly 55 kg
- Purse: ¥ 151,700,000 (as of 2024): 1st: ¥ 70,000,000; 2nd: ¥ 28,000,000; 3rd: ¥ 18,000,000

The Asahi Hai Futurity Stakes (朝日杯フューチュリティステークス) is a one-mile turf stakes race for thoroughbred two years old colts and fillies in Japan. It is considered the de facto year-end championship for Japanese thoroughbred racing in the two-year-olds division.

Inaugurated in 1949, this race had historically been held at the Nakayama Racecourse. From 2014, the race was relocated to the Hanshin Racecourse.

== Winners since 1984 ==
Year	Winner	Jockey	Trainer	Owner	Time
1984	Scrum Dyna	Masato Shibata	Susumu Yano	Shadai Race Horse co	1:35.0
1985	Daishin Fubuki	Yasuo Sugawara	Hiroshi Shibata	Kinji Takahashi	1:35.4
1986	Merry Nice	Yasuhiro Nemoto	Teruo Hashimoto	Fusako Ura	1:35.6
1987	Sakura Chiyono O	Futoshi Kojima	Katsutaro Sakai	Sakura Commerce	1:35.6
1988	Sakura Hokuto O	Futoshi Kojima	Katsutaro Sakai	Sakura Commerce	1:35.5
1989	Ines Fujin	Eiji Nakano	Shuho Kato	Masaaki Kobayashi	1:34.4
1990	Lindo Shaver	Hitoshi Matoba	Takaaki Motoishi	Der Mar Club	1:34.0
1991	Mihono Bourbon	Sadahiro Kojima	Tameo Toyama	Mihono International	1:34.5
1992	L-Way Win	Katsumi Minai	Noriaki Tsubo	Takao Zako	1:35.5
1993	Narita Brian	Katsumi Minai	Masaharu Okubo	Hidenori Yamaji	1:34.4
1994	Fuji Kiseki	Koichi Tsunoda	Sakae Watanabe	Yomoji Saito	1:34.7
1995	Bubble Gum Fellow	Yukio Okabe	Kazuo Fujisawa	Shadai Race Horse co	1:34.2
1996	Meiner Max	Tetsuzo Sato	Hitoshi Nakamura	Thoroughbred Club Ruffian	1:36.3
1997	Grass Wonder	Hitoshi Matoba	Mitsuhiro Ogata	Hanzawa	1:33.6
1998	Admire Cozzene	Michael Roberts	Mitsuru Hashida	Riichi Kondo	1:35.3
1999	Eishin Preston	Yuichi Fukunaga	Shuji Kitahashi	Toyomitsu Hirai	1:34.7
2000	Mejiro Bailey	Norihiro Yokoyama	Kunihiko Take	Mejiro Stud	1:34.5
2001	Admire Don	Shinji Fujita	Hiroyoshi Matsuda	Riichi Kondo	1:33.8
2002	Eishin Champ	Yuichi Fukunaga	Tsutomu Setoguchi	Toyomitsu Hirai	1:33.5
2003	Cosmo Sunbeam	Dario Vargiu	Shozo Sasaki	Misako Okada	1:33.7
2004	Meiner Recolte	Hiroki Goto	Masahiro Horii	Thoroughbred Club Ruffian	1:33.4
2005	Fusaichi Richard	Yuichi Fukunaga	Kunihide Matsuda	Fusao Sekiguchi	1:33.7
2006	Dream Journey	Masayoshi Ebina	Yasutoshi Ikee	Sunday Racing Co., Ltd.	1:34.4
2007	Goshawk Ken	Masaki Katsuura	Makoto Saito	Yoshio Fujita	1:33.5
2008	Seiun Wonder	Yasunari Iwata	Masazo Ryoke	Takao Otani	1:35.1
2009	Rose Kingdom	Futoshi Komaki	Kojiro Hashiguchi	Sunday Racing Co., Ltd.	1:34.0
2010	Grand Prix Boss	Mirco Demuro	Yoshito Yahagi	Grand Prix Co., Ltd.	1:33.9
2011	Alfredo	Craig Williams	Takahisa Tezuka	U Carrot Farm	1:33.4
2012	Logotype	Mirco Demuro	Tsuyoshi Tanaka	Teruya Yoshida	1:33.4
2013	Asia Express	Ryan Moore	Takahisa Tezuka	Yukio Baba	1:34.7
2014	Danon Platina	Masayoshi Ebina	Sakae Kunieda	Danox Co Ltd	1:35.9
2015	Leontes	Mirco Demuro	Katsuhiko Sumii	U Carrot Farm	1:34.4
2016	Satono Ares	Hirofumi Shii	Kazuo Fujisawa	Hajime Satomi	1:35.4
2017	Danon Premium	Yuga Kawada	Mitsumasa Nakauchida	Danox Co Ltd	1:33.3
2018	Admire Mars	Mirco Demuro	Yasuo Tomomichi	Riichi Kondo	1:33.9
2019	Salios	Ryan Moore	Noriyuki Hori	Silk Racing	1:33.0
2020	Grenadier Guards	Yuga Kawada	Mitsumasa Nakauchida	Sunday Racing	1:32.3^{[b]}
2021	Do Deuce	Yutaka Take	Yasuo Tomomichi	Kieffers Co Ltd	1:33.5
2022	Dolce More	Ryusei Sakai	Naosuke Sugai	Three H Racing	1:33.9
2023	Jantar Mantar	Yuga Kawada	Tomokazu Takano	Shadai Race Horse co	1:33.8
2024	Admire Zoom^{[a]}	Yuga Kawada	Yasuo Tomomichi	Junko Kondo	1:34.1
2025	Cavallerizzo	Cristian Demuro	Tatsuya Yoshioka	Silk Racing	1:33.2

- ^{a} The 2024 running took place at Kyoto while Hanshin was closed for redevelopment.
- ^{b} Set the current race record

== Previous Winners ==
- 1949 - Azuma Homare
- 1950 - Tokino Minoru
- 1951 - Takahata
- 1952 - Sangetsu
- 1953 - Taka O
- 1954 - Meiji Hikari
- 1955 - Kitanooh
- 1956 - Kitano Hikari
- 1957 - Katsura Shuho
- 1958 - Unebi Hikari
- 1959 - Matsukazeo
- 1960 - Hakusho
- 1961 - Kanetsushake
- 1962 - Great Yoruka
- 1963 - Umeno Chikara
- 1964 - Ryuugeki
- 1965 - Mejiro Bosatsu
- 1966 - Montasan
- 1967 - Takeshibao
- 1968 - Minoru
- 1969 - Arrow Express
- 1970 - Onward Guy
- 1971 - Toku Zakura
- 1972 - Red Eagle
- 1973 - Mihoranzan
- 1974 - Matsufuji Ace
- 1975 - Bold Symboli
- 1976 - Maruzensky
- 1977 - Gallant Dancer
- 1978 - Bingo Garoo
- 1979 - Lindt Taiyo
- 1980 - Temmon
- 1981 - Hokuto Flag
- 1982 - Nishinoski
- 1983 - Hardy Vision

== See also ==
- Horse racing in Japan
- List of Japanese flat horse races
