= Fuji Stakes =

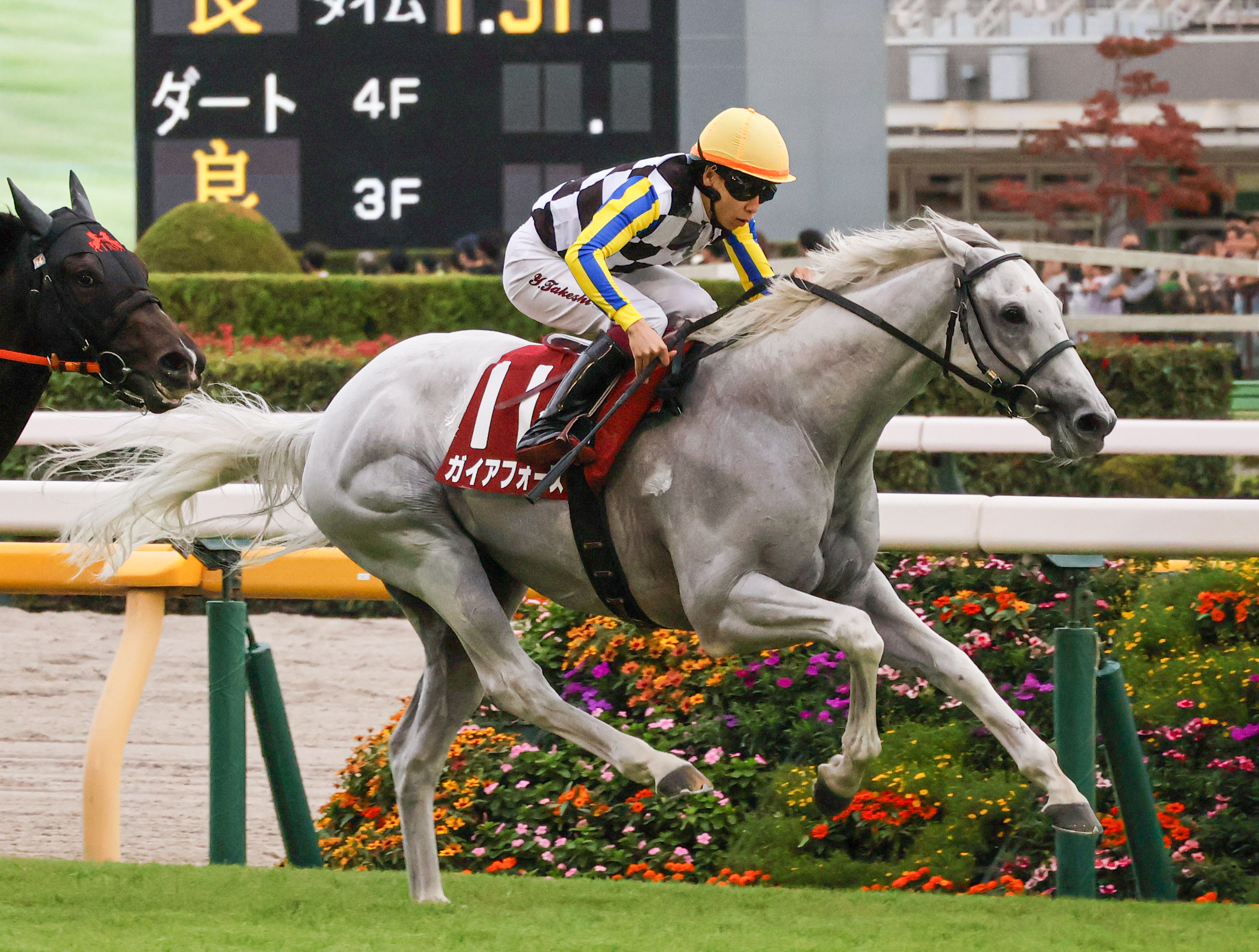
- Gaia Force, winner of the 2025 Fuji Stakes
- Class: Grade 2
- Location: Tokyo Racecourse
- Inaugurated: 1984
- Race type: Thoroughbred Flat racing

Race information
- Distance: 1600 metres
- Surface: Turf
- Track: Left-handed
- Qualification: 3-y-o+
- Weight: Special Weight
- Purse: ¥ 128,140,000 (as of 2025): 1st: ¥ 59,000,000; 2nd: ¥ 24,000,000; 3rd: ¥ 15,000,000

The Fuji Stakes (Japanese 富士ステークス) is a Grade 2 horse race for Thoroughbreds aged three and over, run in October over a distance of 1600 metres at Tokyo Racecourse.

It was first run in 1981 as preparatory race for the local and foreign horses that invited to Japan Cup, renamed to Fuji Stakes in 1984 and held Grade 3 status from 1998 until 2019 before being elevated to its current Grade 2 status. The race was run over 1800 metres until 1996, and over 1400 metres from 1997 to 1999. During its time it was run over 1400 metres, the race was seen as a step race for the Sprinters Stakes which was held in mid-December at the time. In 2000, the race was moved to October and was to be run over its current distance.

From 2014, the race serves as a trial race for the Mile Championship, which is run at Kyoto in November.

== Weight ==
55 kg for three-year-olds, 57 kg for four-year-olds and above.

Allowances:

- 2 kg for fillies / mares
- 1 kg for southern hemisphere bred three-year-olds

Penalties (excluding two-year-old race performance):

- If a graded stakes race has been won within a year:
  - 2 kg for a grade 1 win (1 kg for fillies / mares)
  - 1 kg for a grade 2 win
- If a graded stakes race has been won for more than a year:
  - 1 kg for a grade 1 win

== Previous winners ==
Year	Winner	Age	Jockey	Trainer	Owner	Time
1984	Arrow Bohemian	5	Tomio Yasuda	Yoshimatsu Kaji	Hidekazu Date	1:49.8
1985	Tosho Summit	3	Masatsugu Kashiwazaki	Shinji Okuhira	Tosho Sangyo	1:48.6
1986	Waverley Star	4	Lance O'Sullivan	Dave O'Sullivan	Waverley Park Stud	1:47.5
1987	Triptych	5	Anthony Cruz	Patrick Biancone	Alan Clore	1:46.9
1988	Salem Drive	6	Chris Antley	R. J. Randy	Virginia Kraft Payson	1:46.9
1989	Oracle Asuka	4	Yukio Okabe	Shunji Tamura	Teibun	1:47.8
1990	Mogami Champion	5	Futoshi Kojima	Katsutaro Sakai	Sakura Commerce	1:47.9
1991	Stabilizer	3	Yoshitomi Shibata	Hideo Takahashi	Horseman	1:47.4
1992	Shinko Lovely	3	Yukio Okabe	Kazuo Fujisawa	Osamu Yasuda	1:47.6
1993	Matikanetannhauser	4	Katsuharu Tanaka	Yuji Ito	Masuo Hosokawa	1:48.2
1994	Sakura Chitose O	4	Futoshi Kojima	Katsutaro Sakai	Sakura Commerce	1:46.9
1995	Fujiyama Kenzan	7	Masayoshi Ebina	Hideyuki Mori	Tatsuya Fujimoto	1:47.5
1996	Shinko King	5	Yukio Okabe	Kazuo Fujisawa	Osamu Yasuda	1:48.5
1997	Biko Alpha	7	Michael Roberts	Yukiharu Shikato	Legend	1:22.8
1998	Air Jihad	3	Hiroki Hashimoto	Masanori Ito	Lucky Field	1:23.0
1999	Red Chili Pepper	3	Norihiro Yokoyama	Hiroyoshi Matsuda	Kazuko Yoshida	1:21.4
2000	Daiwa Caerleon	7	Hiroki Tanaka	Yoshitaka Ninomiya	Daiwa Shoji	1:33.9
2001	Kris The Brave	7	Yutaka Yoshida	Masakazu Akiyama	Shadai Race Horse	1:33.2
2002	Meisho Ramses	4	Yoshitomi Shibata	Yuji Ito	Yoshio Matsumoto	1:32.3
2003	Millenium Bio	5	Yutaka Take	Masazo Ryoke	Bio	1:32.0
2004	Admire Max	5	Yutaka Take	Mitsuru Hashida	Riichi Kondo	1:33.2
2005	Win Radius	7	Katsuharu Tanaka	Kazuo Fujisawa	Win	1:32.9
2006	Kinetics	7	Megumu Shinkawa	Megumu Shinkawa	North Hills Management	1:32.8
2007	Meiner Segal	3	Hiroki Goto	Sakae Kunieda	Thoroughbred Club Ruffian	1:33.3
2008	Silent Pride	5	Norihiro Yokoyama	Sakae Kunieda	Shadai Race Horse	1:32.7
2009	Absolute	5	Katsuharu Tanaka	Yoshitada Munakata	Hiroyuki Sonobe	1:33.3
2010	Danon Yoyo	4	Kousei Miura	Hidetaka Otonashi	Danox	1:32.8
2011	Eishin Apollon	4	Hironobu Tanabe	Masahiro Matsunaga	Toyomitsu Hirai	1:35.0
2012	Clarente	3	Yasunari Iwata	Kojiro Hashiguchi	Shinji Maeda	1:32.4
2013	Danon Shark	5	Suguru Hamanaka	Ryuji Okubo	Danox	1:33.5
2014	Staphanos	3	Keita Tosaki	Hideaki Fujiwara	Carrot Farm	1:33.2
2015	Danon Platina	3	Masayoshi Ebina	Sakae Kunieda	Danox	1:32.7
2016	Young Man Power	4	Keita Tosaki	Takahisa Tezuka	Juichi Hoshino	1:34.0
2017	Air Spinel	4	Yutaka Take	Kazuhide Sasada	Lucky Field	1:34.8
2018	Logi Cry	5	Christophe Lemaire	Naosuke Sugai	Masaaki Kumeda	1:31.7
2019	Normcore	4	Christophe Lemaire	Kiyoshi Hagiwara	Seiichi Iketani	1:33.0
2020	Vin de Garde	4	Yuichi Fukunaga	Hideaki Fujiwara	Shadai Race Horse	1:33.4
2021	Songline	3	Kenichi Ikezoe	Toru Hayashi	Sunday Racing	1:33.2
2022	Serifos	3	Yusuke Fujioka	Mitsumasa Nakauchida	G1 Racing	1:32.0
2023	Namur	4	Joao Moreira	Tomokazu Takano	Carrot Farm	1:31.4
2024	Jun Blossom	5	Keita Tosaki	Yasuo Tomomichi	Junji Kawai	1:32.1
2025	Gaia Force	6	Takeshi Yokoyama	Haruki Sugiyama	KR Japan	1:31.7
2026	Sugar Kun	5	Seinosuke Yoshimura	Hisashi Shimizu	Yorikatsu Tsujiko	1:32.2

== See also ==
- Horse racing in Japan
- List of Japanese flat horse races
