= Spring Stakes (Japan) =

Spring Stakes スプリングステークス
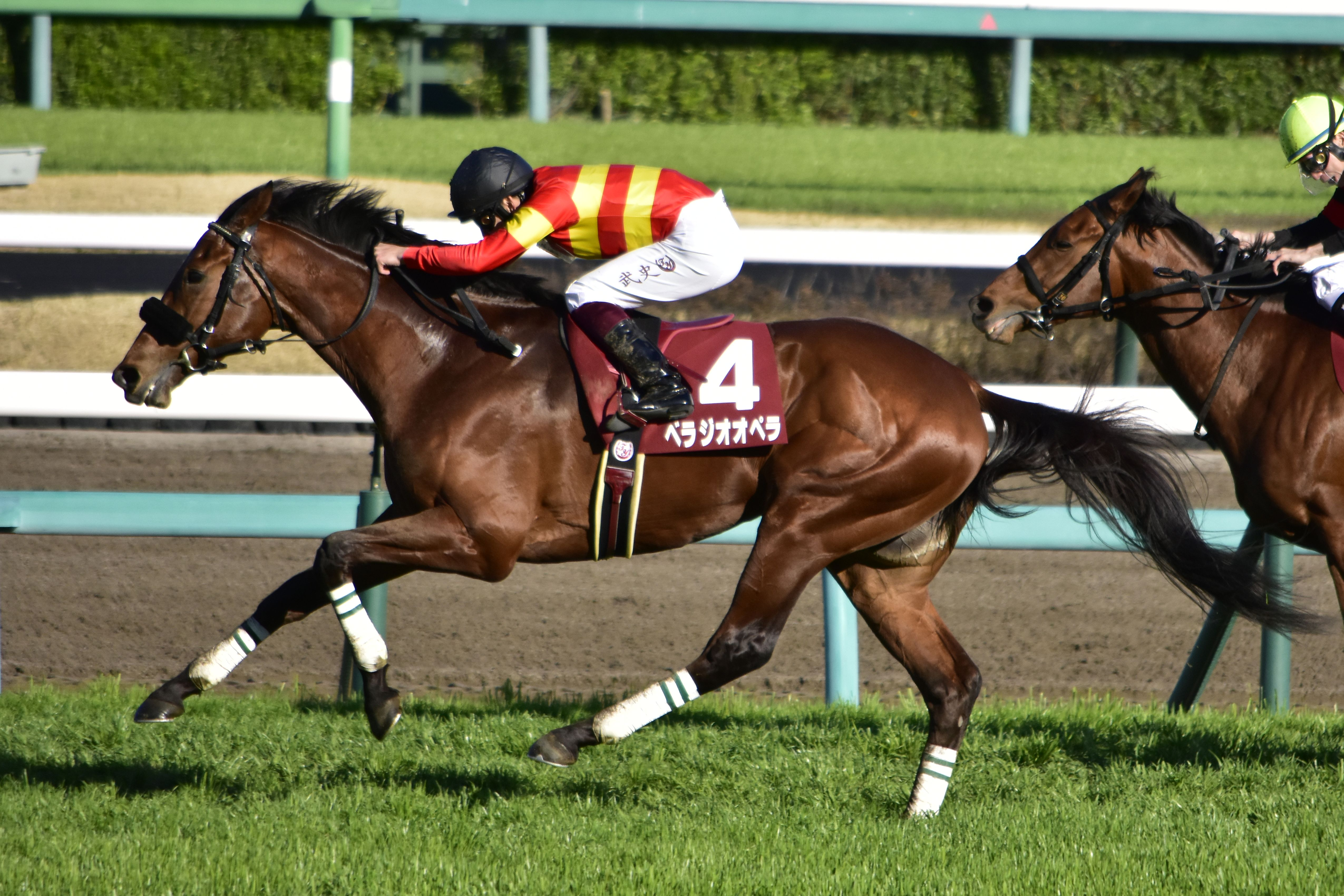
- Bellagio Opera, winner of the 2023 Spring Stakes
- Class: Grade 2
- Location: Nakayama Racecourse, Funabashi, Chiba.
- Inaugurated: 1952
- Race type: Thoroughbred Flat racing

Race information
- Distance: 1800 metres
- Surface: Turf
- Track: Right-handed
- Qualification: 3-y-o Colts & Fillies
- Weight: 57 kg Allowance: Fillies 2 kg
- Purse: ¥ 117,540,000 (as of 2025): 1st: ¥ 54,000,000; 2nd: ¥ 22,000,000; 3rd: ¥ 14,000,000

The Spring Stakes (スプリングステークス, supuringu sutēkusu) is a Grade 2 flat horse race in Japan for three-year-old Thoroughbred colts and fillies run over a distance of 1,800 metres at Nakayama Racecourse, Funabashi, Chiba. The race is run in March and serves as a major trial race for the Satsuki Sho, which is run at the same racecourse in April.

It was first run in 1952. Among the winners of the race have been Shinzan, Mihono Bourbon, Narita Brian, Bubble Gum Fellow, Neo Universe, Meisho Samson and Orfevre.

== Winners since 1994 ==
Year	Winner	Jockey	Trainer	Owner	Time
1994	Narita Brian	Katsumi Minai	Masaaki Ookubo	Hidenori Yamaji	1:49.1
1995	Narita King O	Katsumi Minai	Kentaro Nakao	Hidenori Yamaji	1:54.5
1996	Bubble Gum Fellow	Yukio Okabe	Kazuo Fujisawa	Shadai Race Horse	1:50.1
1997	Big Sunday	Masayoshi Ebina	Tadashi Nakao	Big	1:52.2
1998	Courir Cyclone	Masayoshi Ebina	Ryuichi Inaba	Shuji Yokoyama	1:49.8
1999	Wonder Fang	Hideaki Miyuki	Masazo Ryoke	Nobuyuki Yamamoto	1:51.2
2000	Daitaku Riva	Ryo Takahashi	Kojiro Hashiguchi	Taiyo Farm	1:49.1
2001	Agnes Gold	Hiroshi Kawachi	Hiroyuki Nagahama	Takao Watanabe	1:50.1
2002	Tanino Gimlet	Hirofumi Shii	Kunihide Matsuda	Yuzo Tanimizu	1:46.9
2003	Neo Universe	Mirco Demuro	Tsutomu Setoguchi	Shadai Race Horse	1:48.2
2004	Black Tide	Norihiro Yokoyama	Yasuo Ikee	Makoto Kaneko	1:48.3
2005	Dance in the More	Masayoshi Ebina	Ikuo Aizawa	Iwao Kinami	1:47.3
2006	Meisho Samson	Mamoru Ishibashi	Tsutomu Setoguchi	Yoshio Matsumoto	1:48.9
2007	Flying Apple	Norihiro Yokoyama	Kazuo Fujisawa	Hidetoshi Yamamoto	1:49.0
2008	Smile Jack	Futoshi Komaki	Satoru Kobiyama	Yomoji Saito	1:48.9
2009	Unrivaled	Yasunari Iwata	Yasuo Tomomichi	Sunday Racing	1:50.8
2010	Aliseo	Norihiro Yokoyama	Noriyuki Hori	Shadai Race Horse	1:48.2
2011	Orfevre	Kenichi Ikezoe	Yasutoshi Ikee	Sunday Racing	1:46.4
2012	Grandezza	Mirco Demuro	Osamu Hirata	Shadai Race Horse	1:50.7
2013	Logotype	Cristian Demuro	Tsuyoshi Tanaka	Teruya Yoshida	1:47.8
2014	Rosa Gigantea	Mirco Demuro	Kazuo Fujisawa	Shadai Race Horse	1:48.4
2015	Kitasan Black	Hiroshi Kitamura	Hisashi Shimizu	Ono Shoji	1:49.1
2016	Mount Robson	Andrasch Starke	Noriyuki Hori	Kaneko Makoto Holdings	1:48.1
2017	Win Bright	Masami Matsuoka	Yoshihiro Hatakeyama	Win	1:48.4
2018	Stelvio	Christophe Lemaire	Tetsuya Kimura	Sunday Racing	1:48.1
2019	Emeral Fight	Yukito Ishikawa	Ikuo Aizawa	Tsutomu Takahashi	1:47.8
2020	Galore Creek	Lyle Hewitson	Hiroyuki Uehara	Yukio Minakami	1:49.8
2021	Victipharus	Kenichi Ikezoe	Manabu Ikezoe	G1 Racing	1:52.0
2022	Be Astonished	Yasunari Iwata	Yuzo Iida	Toru Muranaka	1:48.4
2023	Bellagio Opera	Takeshi Yokoyama	Hiroyuki Uemura	Shorai Hayashida	1:48.9
2024	Sixpence	Christophe Lemaire	Sakae Kunieda	Carrot Farm	1:49.4
2025	Piko Chan Black	Shu Ishibashi	Yuki Uehara	Mieko Ishibe	1:51.5
2026	Audacia	Akihide Tsumura	Takahisa Tezuka	Sunday Racing	1:46.0

== Earlier winners ==
- 1952 - Asatomo
- 1953 - Cheerio
- 1954 - Taka O
- 1955 - Nancy Shine
- 1956 - Kitano O
- 1957 - Hikaru Meiji
- 1958 - Daigo Homare
- 1959 - Meitai
- 1960 - Kodama
- 1961 - Yukiro
- 1962 - Kanetsu Seki
- 1963 - Meizui
- 1964 - Shinzan
- 1965 - Dai Koter
- 1966 - Shogun
- 1967 - Mejiro Flame
- 1968 - Marchs
- 1969 - Wild More
- 1970 - Tanino Moutiers
- 1971 - Mejiro Gekko
- 1972 - Tai Tehm
- 1973 - Haiseiko
- 1974 - Kitano Kochidoki
- 1975 - Long Hawk
- 1976 - Ten Point
- 1977 - Yoshino Ryujin
- 1978 - Takeden
- 1979 - Rikiai O
- 1980 - Sir Pen Prince
- 1981 - Sanei Tholon
- 1982 - Hagino Kamui O
- 1983 - Takeno Hien
- 1984 - Bizen Nishiki
- 1985 - Miho Shinzan
- 1986 - Sunny Light
- 1987 - Material
- 1988 - Mogami Nine
- 1989 - Narcisse Noir
- 1990 - Azuma East
- 1991 - Shin Horisky
- 1992 - Mihono Bourbon
- 1993 - Multi Max

== See also ==
- Horse racing in Japan
- List of Japanese flat horse races
