= Kitasan Black =

Japanese-bred Thoroughbred racehorse

Kitasan Black キタサンブラック
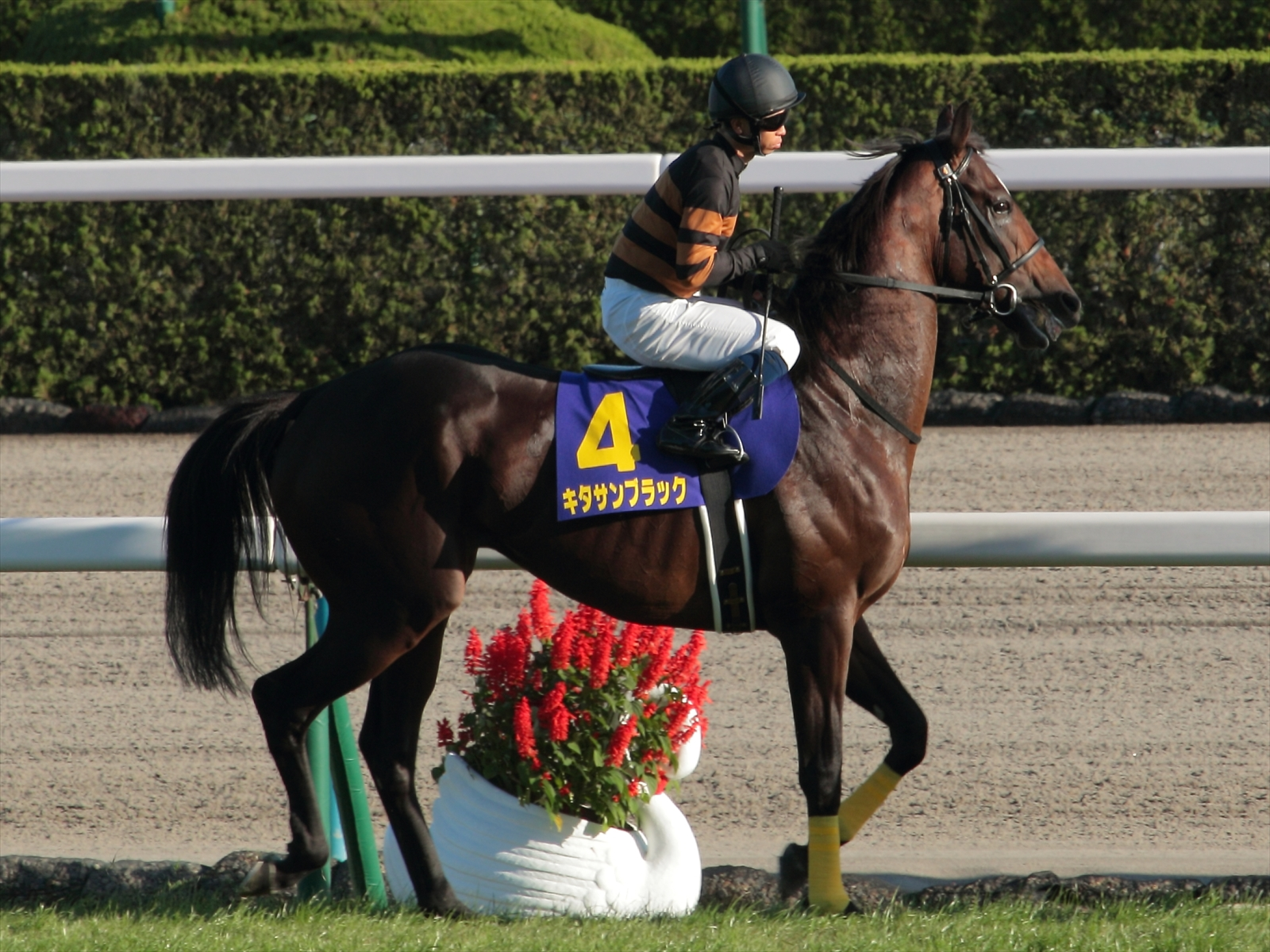
- Kitasan Black during the 2015 Kikuka Shō.
- Breed: Thoroughbred
- Sire: Black Tide (JPN)
- Grandsire: Sunday Silence (USA)
- Dam: Sugar Heart (JPN)
- Damsire: Sakura Bakushin O (JPN)
- Sex: Stallion
- Foaled: March 10, 2012 (age 14)
- Country: Japan
- Colour: Bay
- Breeder: Yanagawa Bokujo
- Owner: Ōno Shōji
- Racing colours
- Trainer: Hisashi Shimizu
- Jockey: Hiroshi Kitamura; Yutaka Take
- Record: 20: 12-2-4
- Earnings: ¥1,876,843,000

Major wins
- Spring Stakes (2015); St Lite Kinen (2015); Tenno Sho (Spring) (2016, 2017); Kyoto Daishoten (2016); Japan Cup (2016); Osaka Hai (2017); Tenno Sho (Autumn) (2017); Arima Kinen (2017); Japanese Classic Race wins: Kikuka Sho (2015)

Awards
- Japanese Horse of the Year (2016, 2017); JRA Award for Best Older Male Horse (2016, 2017)

Honours
- Japan Racing Association Hall of Fame (2020)

Kitasan Black (Japanese: キタサンブラック, Hepburn: Kitasan Burakku; foaled 10 March 2012) is a retired Japanese Thoroughbred racehorse and active sire. In a three-year track career he won twelve of his twenty races, including seven Grade 1 events, won four JRA Awards, and set the record for prize money won in Japan. He was a stayer who has produced most of his best performances over distances of 2400 metres or further. Unraced as a juvenile in 2014 he proved himself one of the best colts of his generation in Japan in the following year with wins in the Spring Stakes, St Lite Kinen and Kikuka Sho as well as third-place finishes in the Satsuki Sho and the Arima Kinen. He continued his good form in the first half of 2016 with a win in the spring edition of the Tenno Sho and a close third in the Takarazuka Kinen. He returned to the track in autumn to win the Kyoto Daishoten and the Japan Cup. His performances in 2016 saw him being voted Japanese Horse of the Year. In the following year he added four more G1 wins and was again named Horse of the Year.

== Background ==
Kitasan Black is a bay horse with a narrow white blaze bred in Japan by the Hokkaido-based Yanagawa Bokujo. During his track career, he has been owned by Ōno Shōji, a company owned by the popular singer Saburo Kitajima. He has been trained for all of his races by Hisashi Shimizu. Kitasan Black is a large Thoroughbred who had weighed up to 540 kg in his racing career.

Kitasan Black is from the third crop of foals sired by Black Tide, who was a full-brother to Deep Impact. Black Tide was a high-class performer in his own right, winning the Spring Stakes in 2004 before his career was severely disrupted by an injury sustained in the Satsuki Sho. His dam Sugar Heart was an unraced daughter of the Japanese Champion Sprinter Sakura Bakushin O. Her dam Otome Gokoro was a half-sister to Cee's Tizzy, the sire of Tiznow, who became in 2001 the only horse to win the Breeders' Cup Classic twice.

== Racing career ==
=== 2015: three-year-old season ===
Kitasan Black began his track career in a contest for unraced three-year-olds over 1800 metres at Tokyo Racecourse on 31 January 2015 and won by a length from Mikki Joy and fourteen others. Three weeks later he followed up with a victory in a minor race over 2000 metres at the same track beating Tosen Rasen by about three lengths. The colt was then stepped up to Grade II level for the Spring Stakes (a trial for the Satsuki Sho) over 1800 metres at Nakayama Racecourse on 22 March. He started at odds of 11.3/1 against eleven opponents including Danon Platina, who had been named Japanese champion two-year-old colt after winning the Asahi Hai Futurity Stakes and Real Steel who had defeated Duramente in the Grade III Tokinominoru Kinen. Ridden as in most of his races that year by Hiroshi Kitamura he won by a neck from Real Steel, with Danon Platina three quarters of a length back in third place. In the Satsuki Sho over 2000 metres at the same track on 19 April he started the 8.7/1 fourth choice in the fifteen runner field and finished third behind Duramente and Real Steel with the favoured Satono Crown (winner of the Yayoi Sho) in sixth place. Following the race his trainer Hisashi Shimizu explained "our horse gave it everything he had and I thought he turned in a good performance. He doesn’t give in easily". On 31 May at Tokyo Racecourse the colt contested the 82nd running of the Tokyo Yushun over 2400 metres but after racing in second place he dropped away quickly in the last 300 metres and finished fourteenth of the eighteen runners behind Duramente.

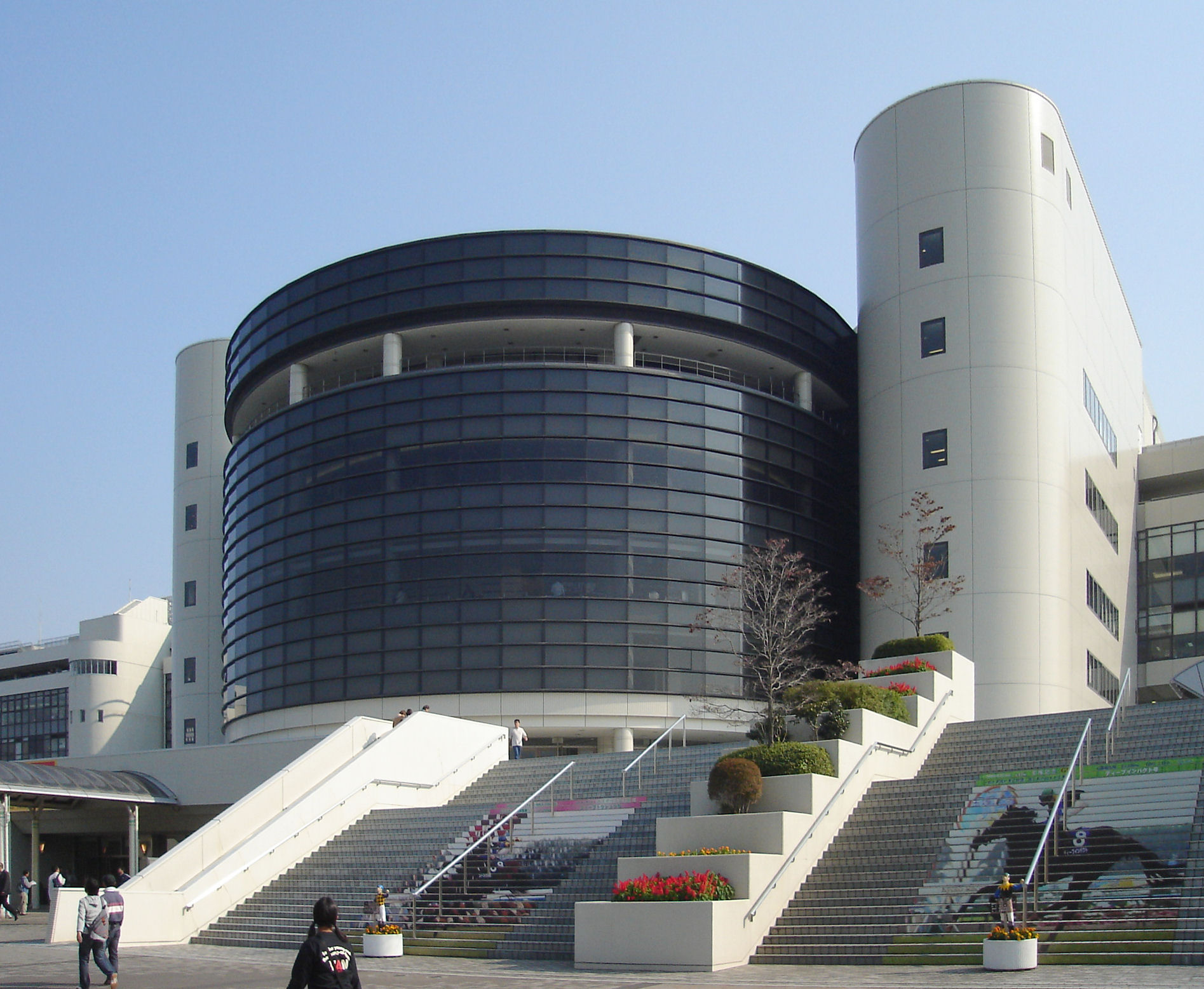
Kyoto Racecourse, where the Kikuka Sho is held

After a break of almost four months, Kitasan Black returned on 21 September for the Grade II St Lite Kinen (a trial race for the Kikuka Sho) over 2200 metres. He started at odds of 11.5/1 in a field headed by Satono Rasen who had finished second in the Tokyo Yushun, with the other fancied contenders including the Grade III winners Bright Emblem and Beruf. In a closely contested finish, he won by three quarters of a length and a head from the outsiders Musee Alien and Jun Tsubasa. On 25 October Kitasan Black was partnered by Kitamura when he started at odds of 12.4/1 in an eighteen-runner field for the Kikuka Sho over 3000 metres at Kyoto Racecourse. The favourite was Lia Fail, the winner of the Grade II Kobe Shimbun Hai, whilst the other runners included Real Steel, Satono Rasen, Beruf, Bright Emblem, Musee Alien and Jun Tsubasa. After racing in fifth place on the inside, Kitasan Black took the lead early in the straight and held off the late challenge of Real Steel by a neck with Lia Fail half a length back in third. After the race Shimizu, who was recording his first Grade I win as a trainer, commented "There were concerns over his aptitude for long distances but I wanted to prove that this was wrong, as his form and movements showed that he is suited to long distances. There were horses chasing us on the outside after we took command so I just hoped that he will hold on until the wire." Owner Saburo Kitajima celebrated by serenading the crowd with a rendition of his hit song "Matsurida (It's Festival Time)".

On his final appearance of 2015, Kitasan Black was matched against older opponents for the first time when he was one of sixteen horses invited by public vote to contest the Arima Kinen over 2500 metres at Nakayama on 27 December. Ridden by Norihiro Yokoyama he finished third behind the four-year-olds Gold Actor and Sounds of Earth, beaten a length by the winner with Gold Ship, Lovely Day, Marialite, and One and Only (2014 Tokyo Yushun) among the beaten runners.

=== 2016: four-year-old season ===
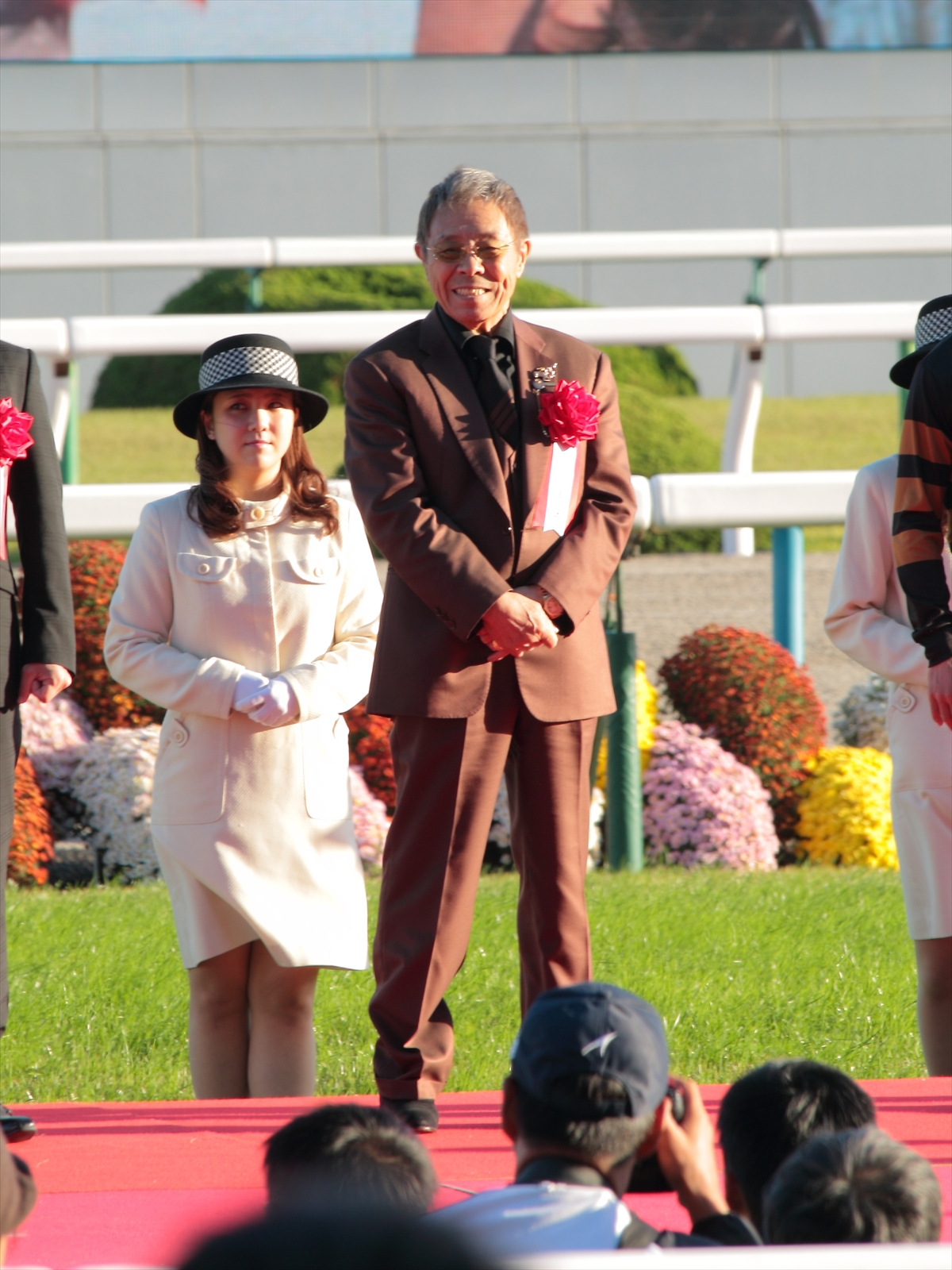
Kitasan Black's owner Saburo Kitajima

In 2016, the veteran Yutaka Take took over as Kitasan Black's regular jockey. The colt began his four-year-old campaign in a strong renewal of the Grade II Osaka Hai over 2000 metres at Hanshin Racecourse on 3 April. He led from the start and looked likely to win before being caught in the final strides and beaten a neck into second place by Ambitious (who was carrying 2 kg less) with the next four places being filled by Shonan Pandora, Lovely Day, Isla Bonita (2014 Satsuki Sho) and Nuovo Record (Yushun Himba).

On May 1st, Kitasan Black moved back up in distance for the spring edition of the Grade I Tenno Sho over 3200 metres at Kyoto and started second favourite behind Gold Actor. The other sixteen runners included Cheval Grand (Hanshin Daishoten), Fame Game (runner-up in the 2015 race), Albert (Stayers Stakes), Sounds of Earth and Toho Jackal (2014 Kikuka Sho). Kitasan Black disputed the lead from the start and held on to win by a nose from the 98/1 outsider Curren Mirotic after a "nail-biting duel" over the last 150 metres. Take, who was winning the race for the seventh time said "I was intending to settle him in a good position after the start. He ran an ideal race, he responded beautifully. He's not the type with an enormous burst of speed, so we made an early bid. It was so close but I’m glad he never gave up and stretched the way he did". On his next start, the colt was one of seventeen horses invited to contest the Grade I Takarazuka Kinen over 2200 metres at Hanshin on 26 June. In another close finish, he took third place, beaten a neck and a nose by Marialite and the odds-on favourite Duramente after leading until the final strides.

On October 10th, Kitasan Black returned from a three and a half month absence for the Grade II Kyoto Daishoten and started 4/5 favourite against eight opponents, headed by Lovely Day and Sounds of Earth. After racing in second place, he took the lead in the straight and won the race by a neck from the outsider Admire Deus with Lovely Day and Sounds of Earth in third and fourth. The 36th running of the Japan Cup over 2400 metres at Tokyo on 27 November attracted a field of seventeen runners and Kitasan Black was made the 2.8/1 favourite. Before the race Take said "I’m not cooking up any special strategies... I’m going to do my best to answer the fans’ expectations as a representative of Japan". The overseas contingent comprised Nightflower (Preis von Europa) and Iquitos (Grosser Preis von Baden) from Germany and Erupt (Grand Prix de Paris, Canadian International Stakes) from France. The leading Japanese contenders included Real Steel (who had won the Dubai Turf in March), Gold Actor, Dee Majesty (Satsuki Sho), Sounds of Earth, Cheval Grand and the filly Rouge Buck. Kitasan Black led from the start, established a clear lead entering the straight and stayed on strongly in the closing stages to win by two and a half lengths from Sounds of Earth. Take, who was winning the race for a record fourth time described the winner as "perhaps the strongest [horse] I've ever experienced". Shimizu indicated that the horse would end his season in the Arima Kinen before being campaigned internationally in 2017 saying "He did everything we asked him to do in the workouts so I was confident of his form. The jockey unleashed him at just the right time. You can’t help but consider Dubai and the Arc as they are natural fits for him".

For his final run of the year, Kitasan Black was again aimed at the Arima Kinen and in the poll to determine the final line up, he topped the voting with over 130,000 votes. In the race he was ridden by Yutaka Take and started the 2.7/1 second choice in the betting behind the three-year-old Satono Diamond in a field of sixteen. Breaking quickly from an inside draw, Kitasan Black settled in second place behind the outsider Maltese Apogee before moving into the lead entering the straight. He turned back a sustained challenge from Gold Actor but was caught in the final strides and beaten a neck by Satono Diamond.

=== 2017: five-year-old season ===
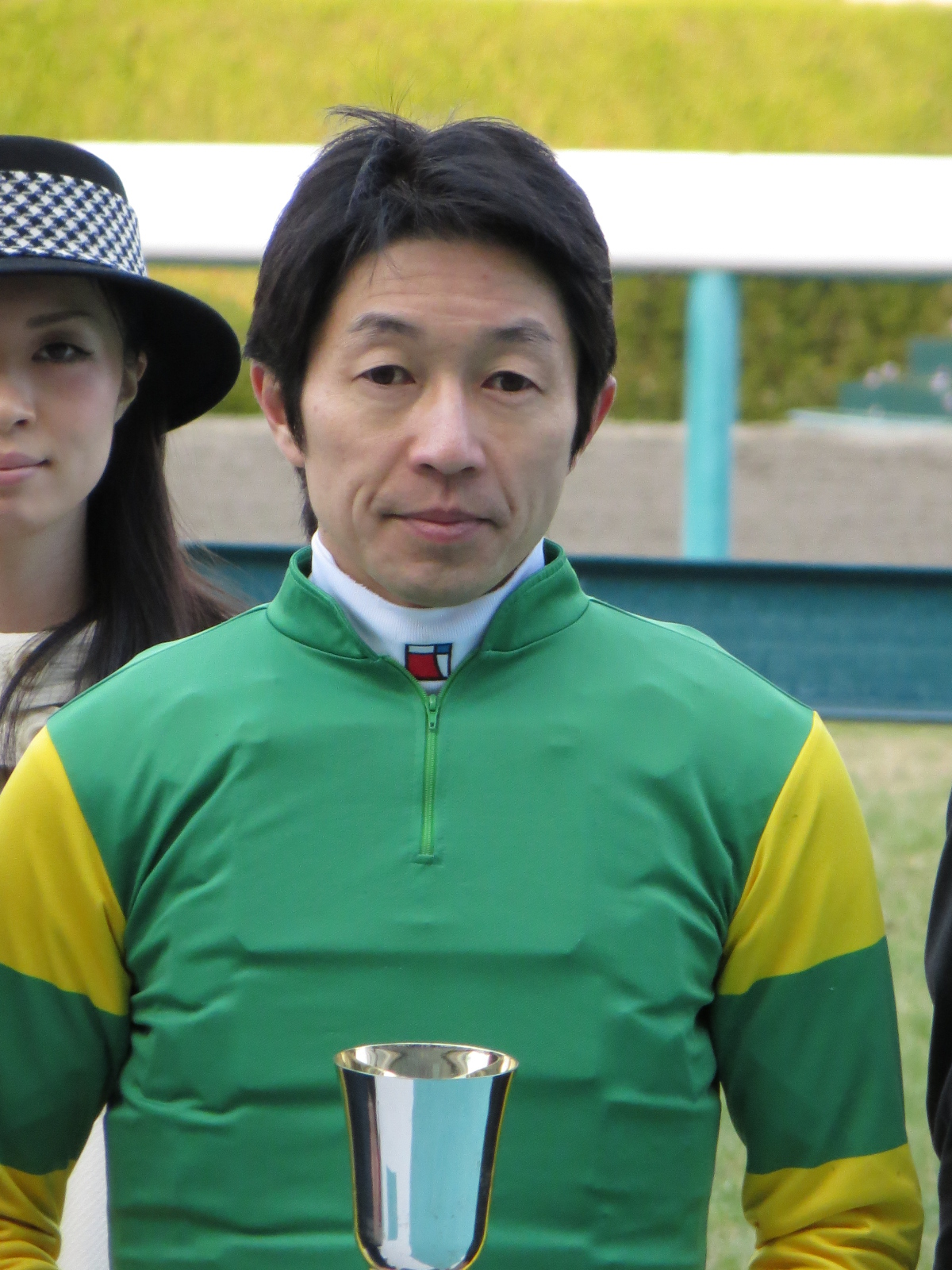
Yutaka Take, who rode Kitasan Black in 2016 and 2017

On April 2nd, Kitasan Black began his five-year-old campaign in the Osaka Hai, which had been elevated to Grade I level for the first time and started the 2.4/1 favourite against thirteen opponents headed by Makahiki and Satono Crown. After racing in third place he moved into the lead in the straight and won by three quarters of a length from Staphanos with Yamakatsu Ace half a length away in third. After the race Take said "I felt his strength had increased so I had all the confidence I needed. The race developed just the way I thought it would. Since he was responding so well, I decided to launch an early bid today, earlier than I would do in other cases." Four weeks later the horse attempted to repeat his 2016 victory in the Tenno Sho and started the 2.2/1 favourite against eighteen opponents headed by Satono Diamond. After racing in second place behind the outsider Yamakatsu Raiden he took the lead entering the straight, opened up a clear advantage and stayed on in the closing stages to win by one and a half lengths. Cheval Grand took second ahead of Satono Diamond and Admire Deus. The winning time of 3:12.5 broke the record for the race, which had been set by Deep Impact in 2006. Take commented, "It was a really tough race, the pace never slowed down. Although the horse had little left, he showed amazing stamina and tenacity up to the end which only he can do. I never thought Deep Impact's record would ever be broken. This horse is just so much stronger than he was a year ago".

In June Kitasan Black ran for the second time in the Takarazuka Kinen and started favourite against ten opponents. After tracking the leader Cheval Grand he was unable to quicken in the straight and finished eighth behind Satono Crown. Take was unable to explain the performance, saying "It didn't rain much so it didn't have much influence on the ground. He was in good form and there was no disadvantage either. He just didn't respond as he usually does. To be honest, I really don't know why". Hisashi Shimizu later suggested that the horse might still have been feeling the effects of his run in the Tenno Sho.

In autumn of 2017, Kitasan Black was sent directly to the Tenno Sho on 29 October without a prep race. Before the race, it was made clear that the horse would retire at the end of the season and would have only two further races: the Japan Cup and the Arima Kinen. His bid to take the prize for a record third time was opposed by seventeen rivals including Satono Crown, Real Steel, Makahiki and the three-year-old filly Soul Stirring (Yushun Himba). On top of this, the race was held in particularly terrible conditions, as a typhoon was close to Tokyo Racecourse at the time. Starting the 2/1 favourite, Kitasan Black made an unusually slow start but recovered and moved up to join the leaders approaching the final turn. He took the lead early in the straight and held off a sustained challenge from Satono Crown to win by a neck. Take said "He was a bit too eager today and missed his break... He responded beautifully in the stretch and before we knew it, we were at the front. He weakened a little during the long drive but held on well". On 26 November the horse started favourite as he attempted to repeat his 2016 success in the Japan Cup. He took the lead soon after the start and maintained his advantage into the straight but was overtaken in the closing stages and finished third behind Cheval Grand and the three-year-old Rey de Oro.

On his farewell appearance at Nakayama on 24 December Kitasan Black made his third attempt to win the Arima Kinen and started favourite in a sixteen-runner field, with the best fancied of his opponents being Satono Crown, Cheval Grand and the improving three-year-old Suave Richard. After taking the lead from the start he broke clear of his rivals in the straight and recorded a "comfortable" length and a half victory from the mare Queens Ring, with Cheval Grand and Suave Richard close behind in third and fourth. The first prize money took his lifetime earnings to 1,876,843,000 yen, breaking the Japanese record held since 2001 by T. M. Opera O. Take commented "I’m so happy. I wanted to meet the fans' expectations, so I wanted to win no matter what. It was an honor to meet such a fine horse, and I had a great time as a jockey," while Shimizu said "All the races are good memories whether he won or lost".

== Assessment and awards ==
In the JRA Awards for 2015 Kitasan Black finished runner-up to Duramente in the voting for the JRA Award for Best Three-Year-Old Colt and fourth in the poll to determine the Japanese Horse of the Year. In the 2015 World's Best Racehorse Rankings he was given a rating of 117 making him the 97th best racehorse in the world and the fourth best three-year-old in the world over extended distances.

In the JRA Awards for 2016 Kitasan Black was named Japanese Horse of the Year taking 134 of the 291 votes ahead of Maurice (90 votes) and Satono Diamond (66). He also topped the poll for Best Older male beating Maurice by 201 votes to 90. In the 2016 edition of the World's Best Racehorse Rankings Kitasan Black was given a rating of 123, making him the 12th best racehorse in the world.

The 2017 JRA Award saw Kitasan Black taking the Japanese Horse of the Year for the second time, as he won 287 of the 290 votes. He was unanimously elected Best Older Male Horse. In the 2017 World's Best Racehorse Rankings, Kitasan Black was given a rating of 124, making him the 9th best racehorse in the world and the best racehorse in Japan.

On 9 June 2020, Kitasan Black was inducted in the Japan Racing Association Hall of Fame.

== Stud career ==
At the end of his racing career, Kitasan Black was retired to become a breeding stallion at the Shadai Stallion Station. His first year progeny included Equinox, who ranked 1st in the 2023 World's Best Racehorse Rankings with a rating of 135.

=== Notable progeny ===
c = colt, f = filly, g = gelding

bold = G1/Jpn1 stakes

Grade One winners
Foaled	Name	Sex	Major Wins
2019	Ecoro Duel	c	Kyoto Jump Stakes, **Nakayama Grand Jump** (twice), **Nakayama Daishogai**
2019	Equinox	c	Tokyo Sports Hai Nisai Stakes, **Tenno Sho (Autumn)** (twice), **Arima Kinen**, **Dubai Sheema Classic**, **Takarazuka Kinen**, **Japan Cup**
2019	Wilson Tesoro	c	Kakitsubata Kinen, Mercury Cup, Hakusan Daishoten, **JBC Classic**, **Mile Championship Nambu Hai**, **Kashiwa Kinen**
2020	Sol Oriens	c	Keisei Hai, **Satsuki Shō**
2022	Croix du Nord	c	Tokyo Sports Hai Nisai Stakes, **Hopeful Stakes**, **Tōkyō Yūshun**, Prix du Prince d'Orange, **Osaka Hai**, **Tenno Sho (Spring)**

Other winners
Foaled	Name	Sex	Major Wins
2019	Gaia Force	c	St Lite Kinen, Fuji Stakes
2019	Odilon	c	Diolite Kinen
2020	Coconuts Brown	f	Queen Stakes
2020	Ravel	f	Artemis Stakes, Challenge Cup
2020	Skilfing	c	Aoba Sho
2020	Uncle Black	c	Kyoto High-jump
2021	Admire Matsuri	f	Fukushima Himba Stakes
2021	Christmas Parade	f	Shion Stakes
2021	Ethelfleda	f	Nakayama Himba Stakes
2022	Ecoro Dinos	c	Kyoto Daishoten
2022	Piko Chan Black	c	Spring Stakes
2022	Satono Carnaval	c	Hakodate Nisai Stakes
2023	Basse Terre	c	Yayoi Sho
2023	Black Chalice	f	Fairy Stakes
2023	Realize Glint	c	Kumotori Sho

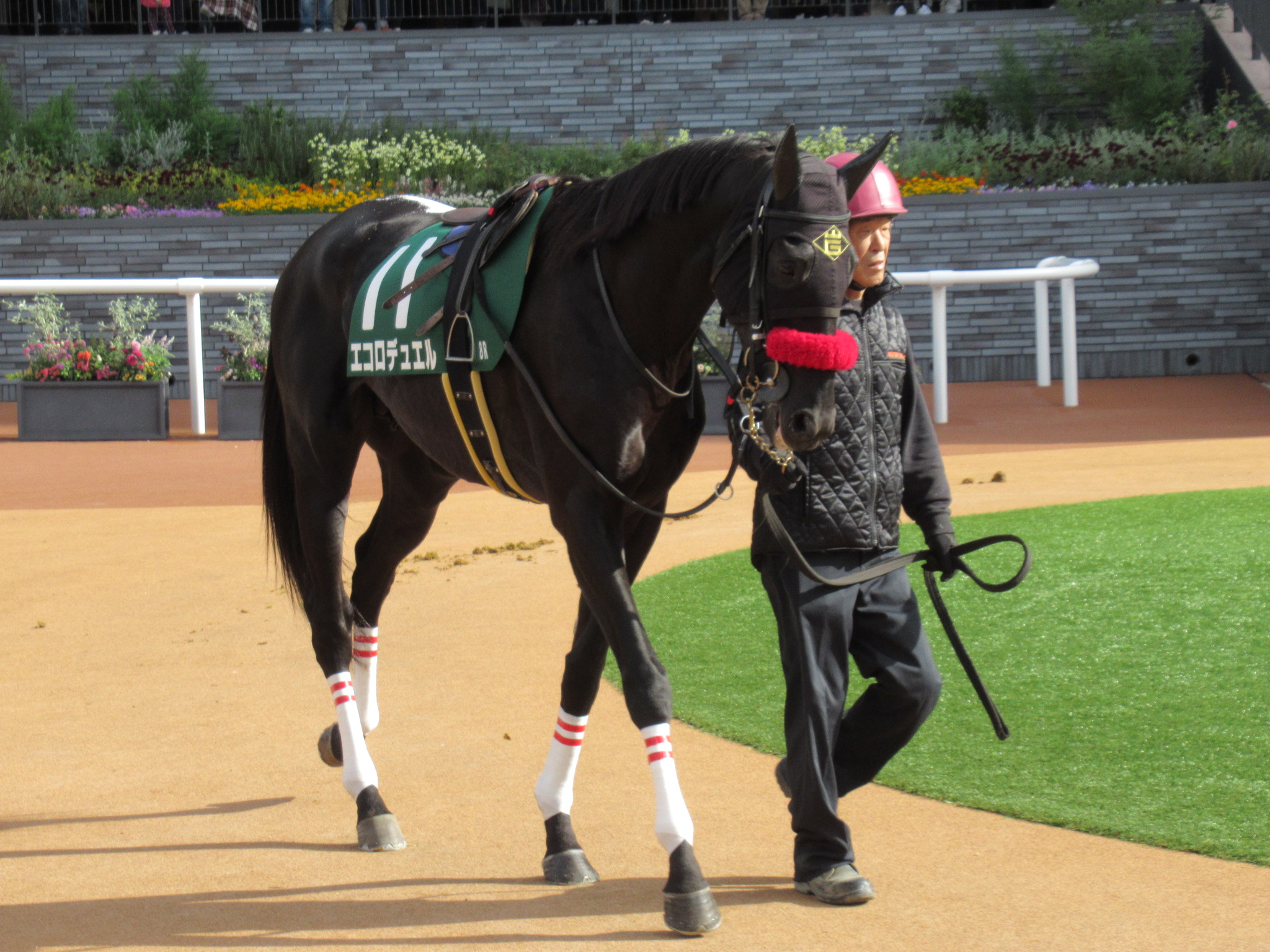
Ecoro Duel

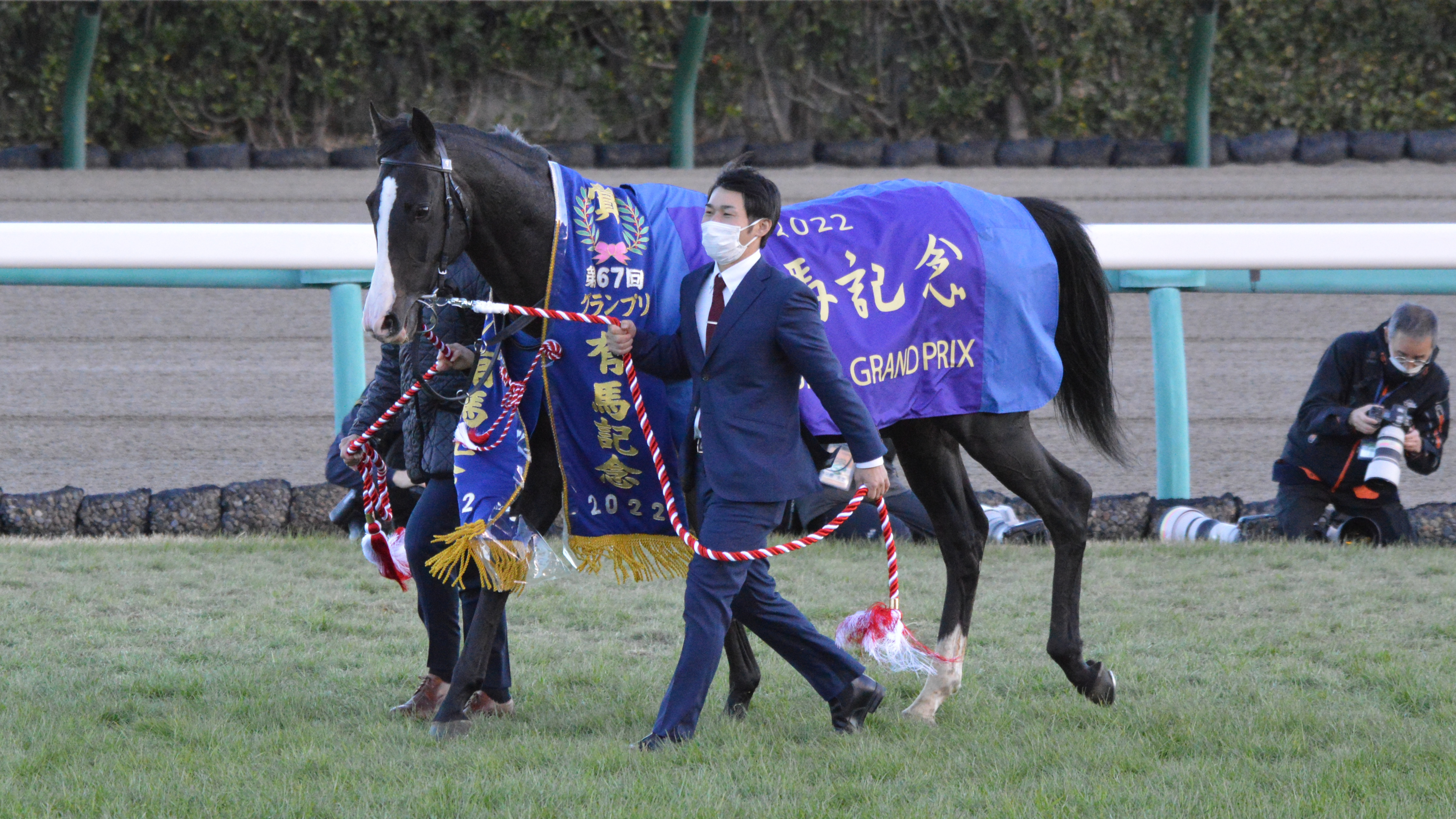
Equinox

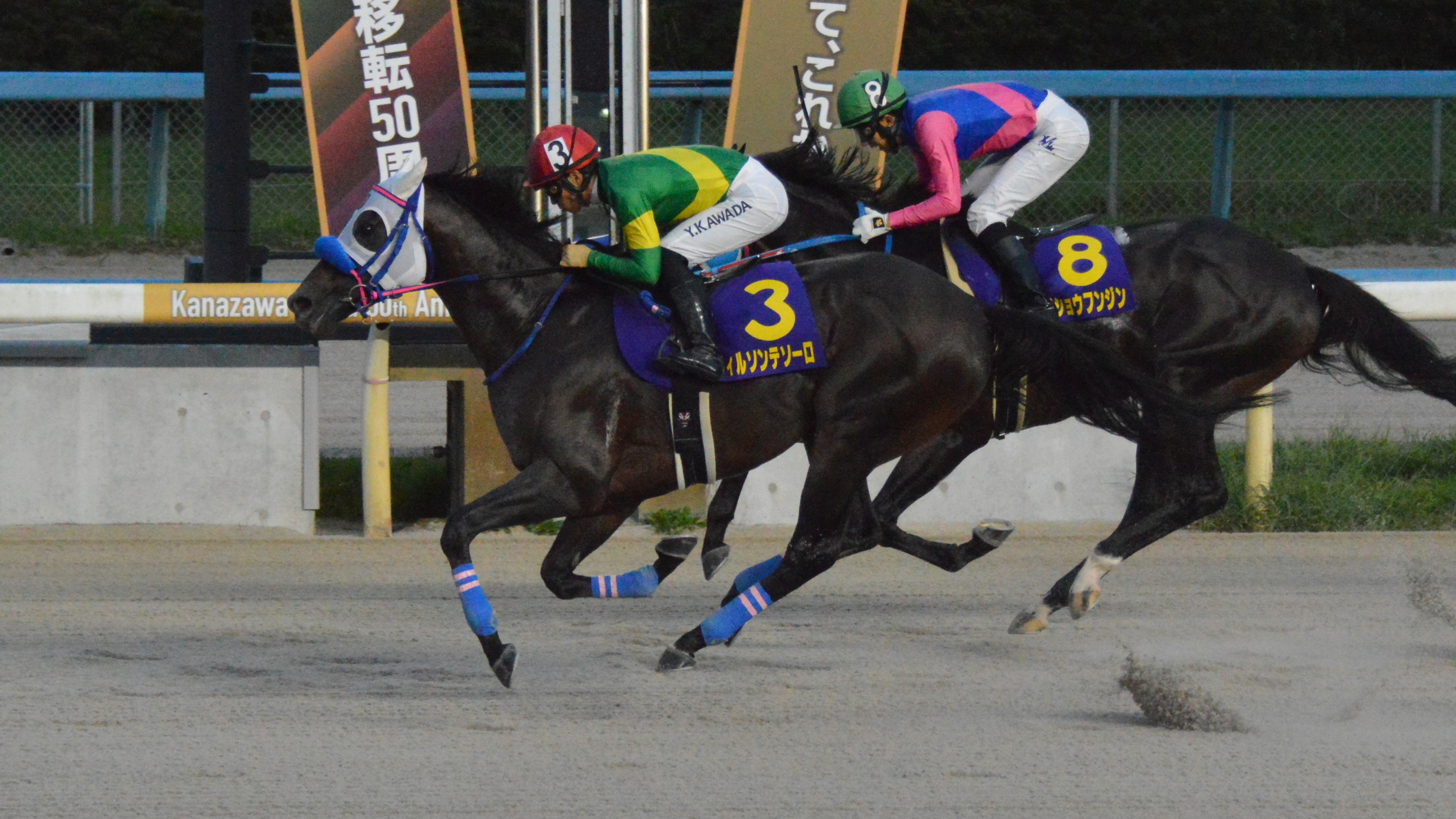
Wilson Tesoro

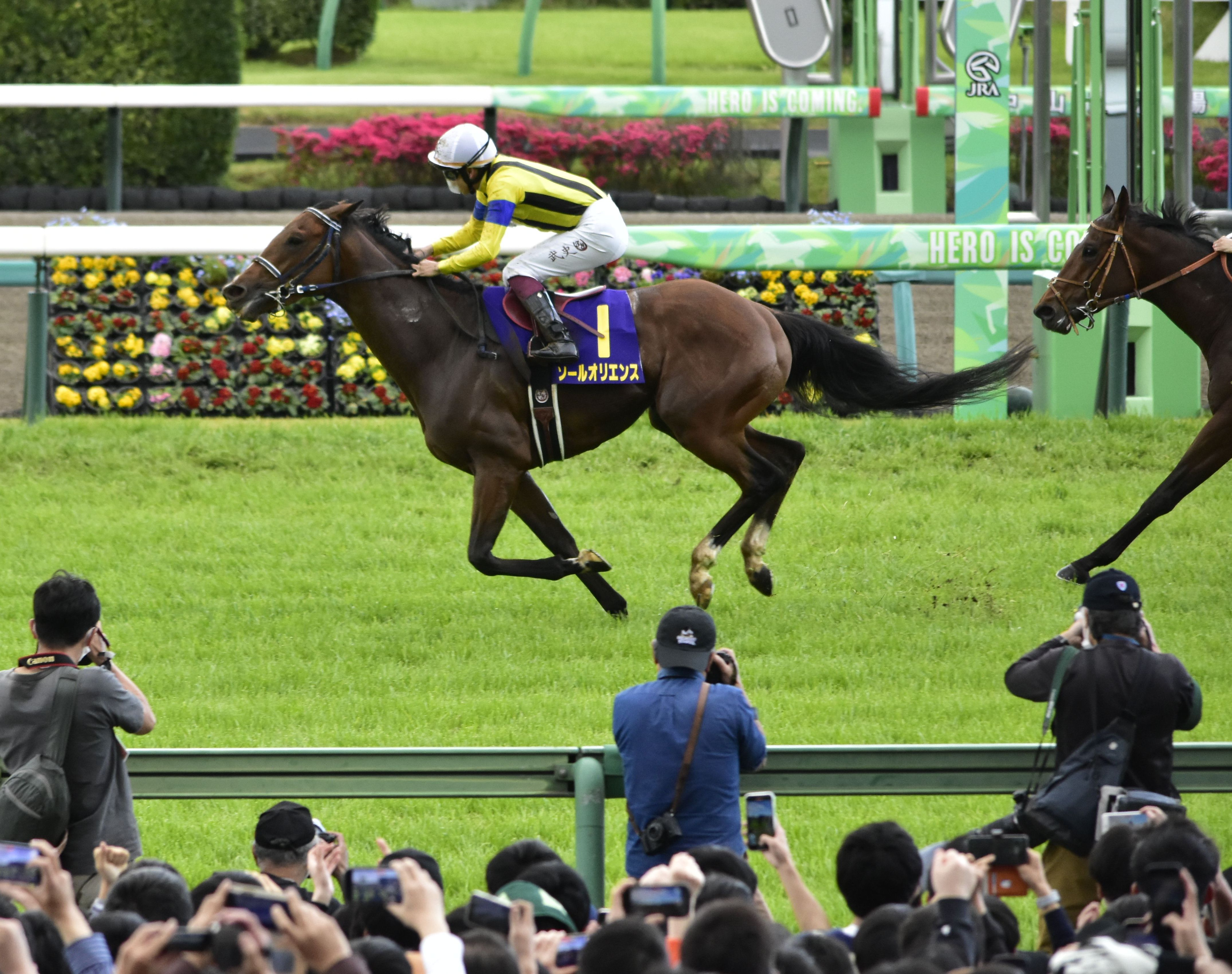
Sol Oriens

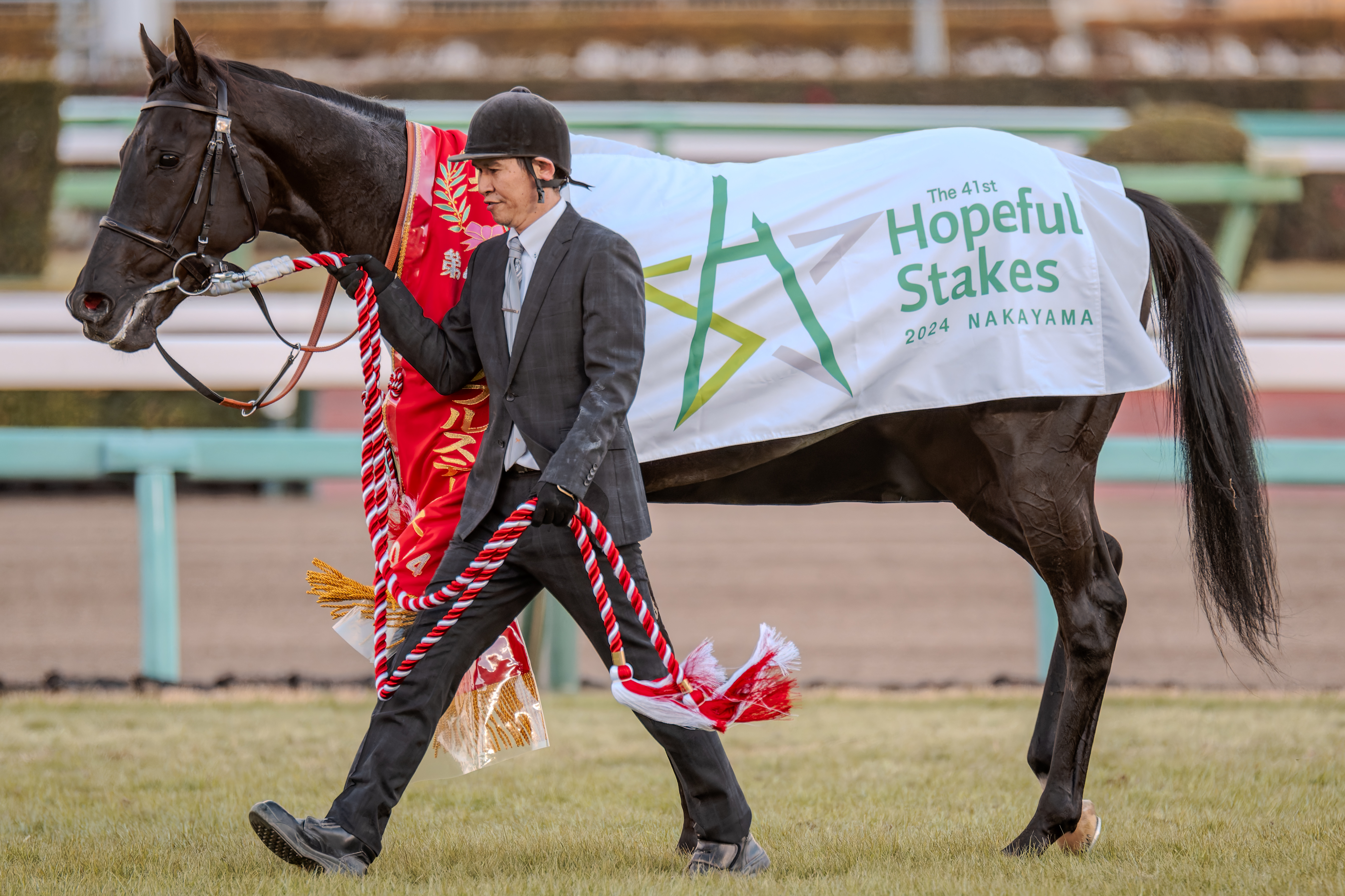
Croix du Nord

== In popular culture ==
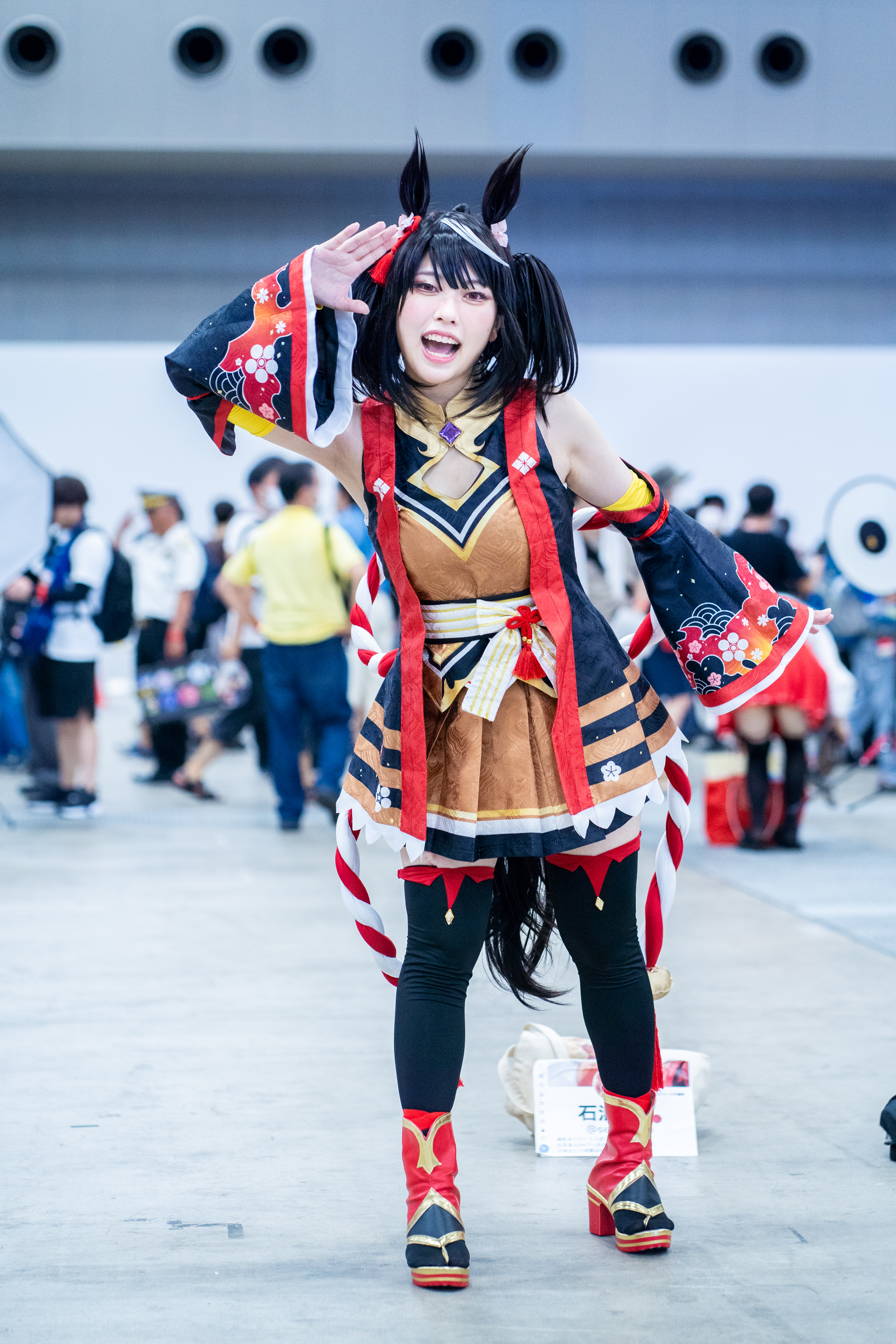
Cosplayer of Kitasan Black from Umamusume: Pretty Derby.

An anthropomorphized version of Kitasan Black appears as a character in the Japanese multimedia franchise Umamusume: Pretty Derby, voiced by Hinaki Yano. She is depicted as an energetic and optimistic girl with an admiration for Tokai Teio, leading her to enroll in Tracen Academy and follow in her footsteps. She has an enthusiasm for strength training and rigorous exercise, which is reflected in her running style being built around her immense stamina and physical durability, allowing her to outlast opponents especially at long-distance races. She also enjoys enka performances, festivals, and helping others, and is the childhood friend, roommate, and rival of Satono Diamond. The third season of the anime features Kitasan Black as the main protagonist.

== Race record ==
The following form is based on information available on netkeiba.com and JBIS-Search.

Date	Distance (Condition)	Race	Class	Course	Field	Odds (Favourite)	Finish	Time	Winning (Losing) Margin	Jockey	Winner (2nd Place)	Ref
2015 – three-year-old season
Jan 31	Turf 1800 m (Good)	Three Year Old Debut		Tokyo	16	7.9 (3rd)	1st	1:52.3	1 1/4 lengths	Hiroki Goto	(Mikki Joy)	
Feb 22	Turf 2000 m (Firm)	Three Year Old	1 Win	Tokyo	14	48.4 (9th)	1st	2:01.4	3 lengths	Hiroshi Kitamura	(Satono Rasen)	
Mar 22	Turf 1800 m (Firm)	Spring Stakes	GII	Nakayama	12	12.3 (5th)	1st	1:49.1	neck	Hiroshi Kitamura	(Real Steel)	
Apr 19	Turf 2000 m (Firm)	Satsuki Sho	GI	Nakayama	15	9.7 (4th)	3rd	1:58.8	(4 lengths)	Suguru Hamanaka	Duramente	
May 31	Turf 2400 m (Firm)	Tokyo Yushun	GI	Tokyo	18	20.7 (6th)	14th	2:25.5	(14 lengths)	Hiroshi Kitamura	Duramente	
Sep 21	Turf 2200 m (Firm)	St Lite Kinen	GII	Nakayama	15	12.5 (6th)	1st	2:13.8	3/4 length	Hiroshi Kitamura	(Musee Alien)	
Oct 25	Turf 3000 m (Firm)	Kikuka Sho	GI	Kyoto	18	13.4 (5th)	1st	3:03.9	neck	Hiroshi Kitamura	(Real Steel)	
Dec 27	Turf 2500 m (Firm)	Arima Kinen	GI	Nakayama	16	8.4 (4th)	3rd	2:33.1	(1 length)	Norihiro Yokoyama	Gold Actor	
2016 – four-year-old season
Apr 3	Turf 2000 m (Firm)	Sankei Osaka Hai	GII	Hanshin	11	6.2 (5th)	2nd	1:59.3	(neck)	Yutaka Take	Ambitious	
May 1	Turf 3200 m (Firm)	Tenno Sho (Spring)	GI	Kyoto	18	4.5 (2nd)	1st	3:15.3	nose	Yutaka Take	(Curren Mirotic)	
Jun 26	Turf 2200 m (Good)	Takarazuka Kinen	GI	Hanshin	17	5.0 (2nd)	3rd	2:12.8	(1/4 length)	Yutaka Take	Marialite	
Oct 10	Turf 2400 m (Firm)	Kyoto Daishoten	GII	Kyoto	10	1.8 (1st)	1st	2:25.5	neck	Yutaka Take	(Admire Deus)	
Nov 27	Turf 2400 m (Firm)	Japan Cup	GI	Tokyo	17	3.8 (1st)	1st	2:25.8	2 1/2 lengths	Yutaka Take	(Sounds of Earth)	
Dec 25	Turf 2500 m (Firm)	Arima Kinen	GI	Nakayama	16	2.7 (2nd)	2nd	2:32.6	(neck)	Yutaka Take	Satono Diamond	
2017 – five-year-old season
Apr 2	Turf 2000 m (Firm)	Osaka Hai	GI	Hanshin	14	2.4 (1st)	1st	1:58.9	3/4 length	Yutaka Take	(Staphanos)	
Apr 30	Turf 3200 m (Firm)	Tenno Sho (Spring)	GI	Kyoto	17	2.2 (1st)	1st	R3:12.5	1 1/4 lengths	Yutaka Take	(Cheval Grand)	
Jun 25	Turf 2200 m (Good)	Takarazuka Kinen	GI	Hanshin	11	1.4 (1st)	9th	2:12.7	(8 1/4 lengths)	Yutaka Take	Satono Crown	
Oct 29	Turf 2000 m (Heavy)	Tenno Sho (Autumn)	GI	Tokyo	18	3.1 (1st)	1st	2:08.3	neck	Yutaka Take	(Satono Crown)	
Nov 26	Turf 2400 m (Firm)	Japan Cup	GI	Tokyo	17	2.1 (1st)	3rd	2:23.9	(1 1/2 lengths)	Yutaka Take	Cheval Grand	
Dec 24	Turf 2500 m (Firm)	Arima Kinen	GI	Nakayama	16	1.9 (1st)	1st	2:33.6	1 1/2 lengths	Yutaka Take	(Queens Ring)	

- R indicated that it was a record time finish

== Pedigree ==
Pedigree of Kitasan Black (JPN), bay stallion 2012
Sire Black Tide (JPN) 2001	Sunday Silence (USA); 1986	Halo	Hail to Reason
Sire Black Tide (JPN) 2001	Sunday Silence (USA); 1986	Halo	Cosmah
Sire Black Tide (JPN) 2001	Sunday Silence (USA); 1986	Wishing Well	Understanding
Sire Black Tide (JPN) 2001	Sunday Silence (USA); 1986	Wishing Well	Mountain Flower
Sire Black Tide (JPN) 2001	Wind in Her Hair (IRE); 1991	Alzao	Lyphard
Sire Black Tide (JPN) 2001	Wind in Her Hair (IRE); 1991	Alzao	Lady Rebecca
Sire Black Tide (JPN) 2001	Wind in Her Hair (IRE); 1991	Burghclere	Busted
Sire Black Tide (JPN) 2001	Wind in Her Hair (IRE); 1991	Burghclere	Highclere
Dam Sugar Heart (JPN) 2005	Sakura Bakushin O (JPN); 1989	Sakura Yutaka O	Tesco Boy
Dam Sugar Heart (JPN) 2005	Sakura Bakushin O (JPN); 1989	Sakura Yutaka O	Angelica
Dam Sugar Heart (JPN) 2005	Sakura Bakushin O (JPN); 1989	Sakura Hagoromo	Northern Taste
Dam Sugar Heart (JPN) 2005	Sakura Bakushin O (JPN); 1989	Sakura Hagoromo	Clear Amber
Dam Sugar Heart (JPN) 2005	Otome Gokoro (JPN); 1990	Judge Angelucci	Honest Pleasure
Dam Sugar Heart (JPN) 2005	Otome Gokoro (JPN); 1990	Judge Angelucci	Victorian Queen
Dam Sugar Heart (JPN) 2005	Otome Gokoro (JPN); 1990	Tizly	Lyphard
Dam Sugar Heart (JPN) 2005	Otome Gokoro (JPN); 1990	Tizly	Tizna (Family: 9-g)

- Kitasan Black was inbred 4 × 4 to Lyphard, meaning that this stallion appears twice in the fourth generation of his pedigree.

== See also ==
- List of racehorses
