= Sounds of Earth (horse) =

Japanese Thoroughbred racehorse

Sounds of Earth サウンズオブアース
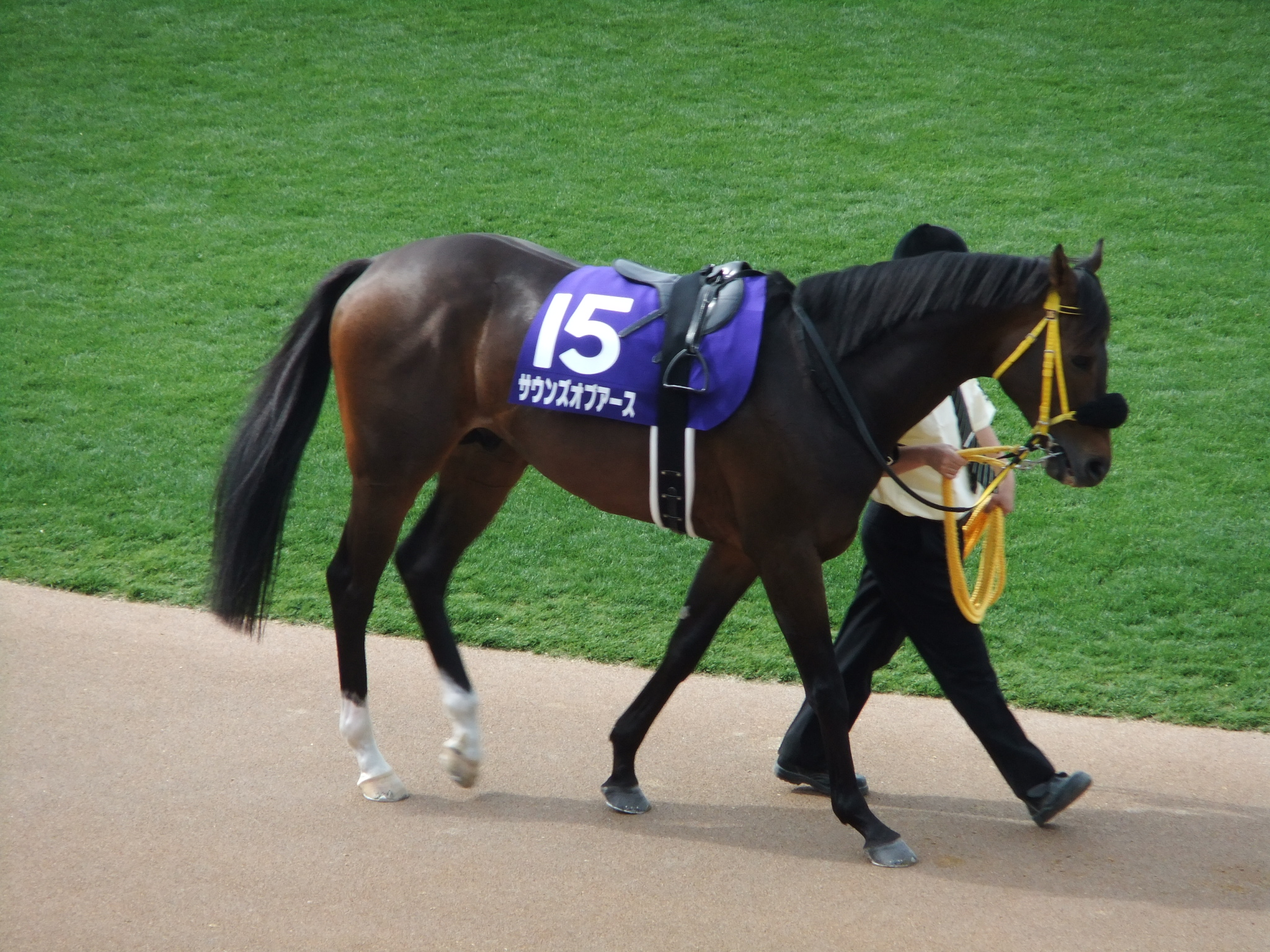
- Sounds of Earth at the paddock for the 2015 Tenno Sho (Spring).
- Breed: Thoroughbred
- Sire: Neo Universe
- Grandsire: Sunday Silence
- Dam: First Violin
- Damsire: Dixieland Band
- Sex: Stallion
- Foaled: April 12, 2011
- Died: February 13, 2023 (aged 11)
- Country: Japan
- Color: Dark Bay
- Breeder: Shadai Farm
- Owner: Teruya Yoshida
- Racing colors
- Trainer: Kenichi Fujioka
- Jockey: Mirco Demuro
- Record: 30: 2-8-1
- Earnings: ¥467,450,000

Sounds of Earth (Japanese: サウンズオブアース, Hepburn: Saunzu obu Āsu; April 12, 2011 – February 13, 2023) was a Japanese Thoroughbred racehorse. His notable achievements include finishing second in the 2014 Kikuka Sho, 2015 Arima Kinen, and 2016 Japan Cup. Although he only won twice in a maiden race and a 5-million-yen class race, Sounds of Earth finished second seven times in graded stakes races, including Grade I events. Because he consistently came so close to winning a graded stakes race, Sounds of Earth was dubbed “the strongest two-win horse” during his racing career. His name is an allusion to the names of his sire Neo Universe and dam First Violin.

== Racing career ==
Sounds of Earth made his debut in October of his two-year-old season and, despite running three races that year, was unable to secure a win. However, he claimed his first victory in his first race of his three-year-old season. After finishing third in the Wakaba Stakes, he won the Hanamizuki Sho and then placed second in the Kyoto Shimbun Hai, earning enough prize money to qualify for the Tokyo Yushun, where he ultimately finished 11th.

In his first race of the fall, the Kobe Shimbun Hai, he put up a strong fight, finishing a close second behind Derby winner One and Only, and he continued to make a name for himself by finishing second behind Toho Jackal in the subsequent Kikuka Sho.

Although his performance was somewhat lackluster during his four-year-old season, he finished second, a neck behind Gold Actor, in the Arima Kinen.

As a 5-year-old, he struggled in the spring just as he had the previous year, but in, the Japan Cup, he finished second behind Kitasan Black. He finished eighth in the Arima Kinen.

In 2017, at age six, Sounds off Earth made his first overseas attempt in the Dubai Sheema Classic but suffered a crushing defeat, finishing sixth in a field of seven. For his first race back in Japan, he ran in the Sapporo Kinen. Ridden by Norihiro Yokoyama, he finished fourth, marking his first top-five finish since the previous year’s Japan Cup. At that time, he became the only non-King Kamehameha offspring to place in the top five. After a one-and-a-half-month break, he ran in the Kyoto Daishoten for his next start but finished 13th.

At the Sapporo Kinen at age seven, Sounds of Earth finished fourth for the second consecutive year. He then placed ninth in the Mainichi Okan and finished 14th in the Japan Cup, falling far short of Almond Eye’s record-breaking time. He retired after that year’s Arima Kinen, where he finished a lackluster 16th, bringing up the rear. His registration as a racehorse was revoked on December 27, 2018.

== Retirement ==
After retirement, Sounds of Earth was unable to become a stallion and was used as a riding horse. He was stabled at Momose Riding Farm in Sapporo, Hokkaido, but died on February 13, 2023, due to colitis. He was 11 years old at the time of his death.

== In popular culture ==
An anthropromorphized version of Sounds of Earth appears as a character in the Japanese multimedia franchise Umamusume: Pretty Derby, voiced by MAKIKO. She is depicted as an elegant, flirtatious, and passionately artistic girl who likes to celebrate her participation in races by playing her violin at the race paddock and after crossing the finish line. This facet is interpreted differently across various Umamusume media, with the game showing Sounds of Earth as a truly skilled musician, while the anime series' third season implies that her violin is an electronic replica playing canned music that she mimes performing.

== Racing form ==
The following racing form is based on information available on JBIS search and netkeiba.com.

Date	Age	Racecourse	Race	Grade	Distance	Gate	Odds	Fav.	Fin.	Time	Margin	Jockey	Winner (Runner-Up)
Oct 13, 2013	2	Kyoto	Two-Year-Old Newcomer	Maiden	2000m	3	1.9	1	5th	2:02.6	0.5	Y.Fukunaga	A Shin Allonsy
Nov 2, 2013	2	Kyoto	Two-Year-Old Maiden	Maiden	1800m	6	2.5	1	2nd	1:47.5	0.0	M.Demuro	Satono Rob Roy
Nov 16, 2013	2	Kyoto	Two-Year-Old Maiden	Maiden	1800m	12	1.6	1	4th	1:50.2	0.7	M.Demuro	Shingan
Feb 22, 2014	3	Kyoto	Three-Year-Old Maiden	Maiden	2000m	4	2.3	1	1st	2:02.1	-0.1	C.Demuro	(Admire Cima)
Mar 22, 2014	3	Hanshin	Wakaba Stakes	OP	2000m	2	5.5	3	3rd	2:01.8	0.4	M.Demuro	Admire Deus
Apr 19, 2014	3	Hanshin	Hanamizuki Sho	Pre-OP	2000m	3	1.5	1	1st	2:03.0	0.0	Y.Fukunaga	(Strawberry King)
May 10, 2014	3	Kyoto	Kyoto Shimbun Hai	G2	2200m	11	13.7	8	2nd	2:11.2	0.2	S.Hamanaka	Hagino Hybrid
Jun 1, 2014	3	Tokyo	Tokyo Yushun	G1	2400m	1	77.2	11	11th	2:25.8	1.2	S.Hamanaka	One and Only
Sep 28, 2014	3	Hanshin	Kobe Shimbun Hai	G2	2400m	11	58.1	8	2nd	2:24.4	0.0	Y.Fujioka	One and Only
Oct 26, 2014	3	Kyoto	Kikuka Sho	G1	3000m	4	8.6	4	2nd	3:01.1	0.1	M.Ebina	Toho Jackal
Mar 28, 2015	4	Nakayama	Nikkei Sho	G2	2500m	10	3.5	1	4th	2:30.5	0.3	M.Demuro	Admire Deus
May 3, 2015	4	Kyoto	Tenno Sho (Spring)	G1	3200m	15	6.2	4	9th	3:15.4	0.7	H.Uchida	Gold Ship
Oct 12, 2015	4	Kyoto	Kyoto Daishoten	G2	2400m	10	3.9	2	2nd	2:23.8	0.2	S.Hamanaka	Lovely Day
Nov 29, 2015	4	Tokyo	Japan Cup	G1	2400m	10	11.3	5	5th	2:25.0	0.3	M.Demuro	Shonan Pandora
Dec 27, 2015	4	Nakayama	Arima Kinen	G1	2500m	9	9.9	5	2nd	2:33.0	0.0	M.Demuro	Gold Actor
Mar 26, 2016	5	Nakayama	Nikkei Sho	G2	2500m	4	2.4	1	2nd	2:36.9	0.1	Y.Fukunaga	Gold Actor
May 1, 2016	5	Kyoto	Tenno Sho (Spring)	G1	3200m	15	8.3	5	15th	3:18.5	3.2	Y.Fujioka	Kitasan Black
Oct 10, 2016	5	Kyoto	Kyoto Daishoten	G2	2400m	8	4.8	3	4th	2:25.7	0.2	M.Demuro	Kitasan Black
Nov 27, 2016	5	Tokyo	Japan Cup	G1	2400m	12	12.2	5	2nd	2:26.2	0.4	M.Demuro	Kitasan Black
Dec 25, 2016	5	Nakayama	Arima Kinen	G1	2500m	6	8.7	4	8th	2:33.4	0.8	M.Demuro	Satono Diamond
Mar 25, 2017	6	Meydan	Dubai Sheema Classic	G1	2410m	4	6.5	4	6th	2:34.5	2.1	C.Lemaire	Jack Hobbs
Aug 20, 2017	6	Sapporo	Sapporo Kinen	G2	2000m	7	8.0	4	4th	2:00.7	0.3	N.Yokoyama	Sakura Empereur
Oct 9, 2017	6	Kyoto	Kyoto Daishoten	G2	2400m	2	4.2	2	13th	2:24.6	1.6	N.Yokoyama	Smart Layer
Nov 26, 2017	6	Tokyo	Japan Cup	G1	2400m	5	102.0	11	12th	2:25.2	1.5	H.Tanabe	Cheval Grand
Dec 24, 2017	6	Nakayama	Arima Kinen	G1	2500m	16	132.9	14	7th	2:34.2	0.6	C.Demuro	Kitasan Black
May 27, 2018	7	Tokyo	Meguro Kinen	G2	2500m	5	9.2	5	12th	2:30.9	1.2	H.Bowman	Win Tenderness
Aug 19, 2018	7	Sapporo	Sapporo Kinen	G2	2000m	12	70.4	13	4th	2:01.2	0.1	Y.Fujioka	Sungrazer
Oct 7, 2018	7	Tokyo	Mainichi Okan	G2	1800m	11	53.3	10	9th	1:45.4	0.9	H.Tanabe	Aerolithe
Nov 25, 2018	7	Tokyo	Japan Cup	G1	2400m	7	246.5	13	14th	2:25.2	4.6	H.Tanabe	Almond Eye
Dec 23, 2018	7	Nakayama	Arima Kinen	G1	2500m	7	144.2	14	16th	2:34.5	2.3	Y.Fujioka	Blast Onepiece

Legend:
Turf

== Pedigree ==
Pedigree of Sounds of Earth (JPN)
Sire Neo Universe (JPN)	Sunday Silence (USA)	Halo	Hail To Reason
Sire Neo Universe (JPN)	Sunday Silence (USA)	Halo	Cosmah
Sire Neo Universe (JPN)	Sunday Silence (USA)	Wishing Well	Understanding
Sire Neo Universe (JPN)	Sunday Silence (USA)	Wishing Well	Mountain Flower
Sire Neo Universe (JPN)	Pointed Path (GB)	Kris	Sharpen Up
Sire Neo Universe (JPN)	Pointed Path (GB)	Kris	Doubly Sure
Sire Neo Universe (JPN)	Pointed Path (GB)	Silken Way	Shantung
Sire Neo Universe (JPN)	Pointed Path (GB)	Silken Way	Boulevard
Dam First Violin (USA)	Dixieland Band (USA)	Northern Dancer (CAN)	Nearctic
Dam First Violin (USA)	Dixieland Band (USA)	Northern Dancer (CAN)	Natalma
Dam First Violin (USA)	Dixieland Band (USA)	Mississippi Mud	Delta Judge
Dam First Violin (USA)	Dixieland Band (USA)	Mississippi Mud	Sand Baggy
Dam First Violin (USA)	Suprise Symphony	Secretariat (USA)	Bold Ruler
Dam First Violin (USA)	Suprise Symphony	Secretariat (USA)	Somethingroyal
Dam First Violin (USA)	Suprise Symphony	Wimbledon Star	Hoist The Flag
Dam First Violin (USA)	Suprise Symphony	Wimbledon Star	Chris Evert (Family: 23-b)
