= One and Only (horse) =

Japanese Thoroughbred racehorse

One And Only; ワンアンドオンリー
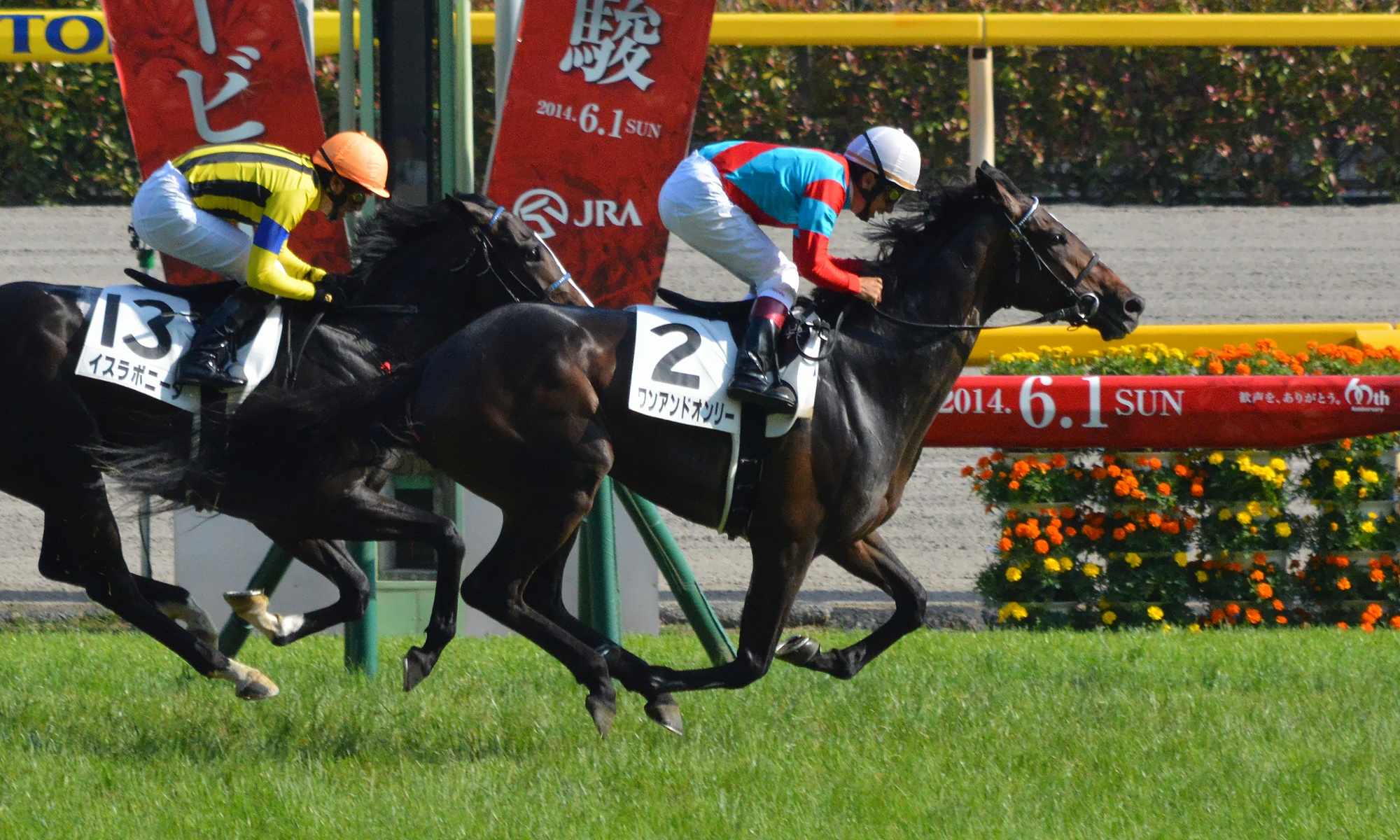
- One And Only winning the Tokyo Yushun
- Sire: Heart's Cry
- Grandsire: Sunday Silence
- Dam: Virtue
- Damsire: Taiki Shuttle
- Sex: Stallion
- Foaled: 23 February 2011
- Country: Japan
- Colour: Bay
- Breeder: North Hills Co Ltd
- Owner: North Hills Co Ltd; Koji Maeda
- Racing colours
- Trainer: Kojiro Hashiguchi; Shinsuke Hashiguchi
- Jockey: Norihiro Yokoyama
- Record: 33: 4-3-1
- Earnings: Japan: ¥372,681,000; Overseas: ¥93,441,000

Major wins
- Radio Nikkei Hai Nisai Stakes (2013); Kobe Shimbun Hai (2014); Japanese Classic Race wins: Tokyo Yushun (2014)

One And Only (Japanese: ワンアンドオンリー, foaled 23 February 2011) is a Japanese retired Thoroughbred racehorse and sire best known for his win in the 2014 Tokyo Yushun (Japanese Derby). He showed great promise as a juvenile in 2013 when he won two of his six races including the Grade 3 Radio Nikkei Hai Nisai Stakes. In the following year he ran second in the Yayoi Sho and fourth in the Satsuki Sho before taking the Tokyo Yushun and added another major success in autumn when he won the Kobe Shimbun Hai. He finished third in the Dubai Sheema Classic on his first appearance as a four-year-old but was disappointing thereafter as he failed to win or place in nineteen subsequent races.

== Background ==
One And Only is a bay horse with a white blaze bred in Japan by North Hills Co Ltd. He raced in the colours of North Hills' owner Koji Maeda and was sent into training with Kojiro Hashiguchi.

He was from the fourth crop of foals sired by Heart's Cry, a horse whose wins included the Arima Kinen and the Dubai Sheema Classic. His other foals have included Suave Richard, Admire Rakti, Just A Way and Lys Gracieux. One And Only's dam Virtue showed some racing ability, winning three times from 27 starts in Japan between 2004 and 2008. She was a female-line descendant of the American broodmare Courtly Dee (foaled 1968), making her a relative of Arch, Green Desert and Bayern.

== Racing career ==
=== 2013: two-year-old season ===
On his racecourse debut One And Only finished unplaced in a contest for previously unraced juveniles at Kokura Racecourse on 4 August and the finished second to Prokris in a maiden race over 1600 metres at Hanshin Racecourse a month later. Racing over the same course and distance on 29 September he recorded his first success as he won a maiden from seventeen opponents. He was then stepped up in class and finished second in the Listed Hagi Stakes at Kyoto Racecourse before running sixth to Isla Bonita in the Grade 3 Tokyo Sports Hai Nisai Stakes at Tokyo Racecourse on 16 November. Christophe Lemaire took the ride when the colt started at odds of 12.7/1 for the Grade 3 Radio Nikkei Hai Nisai Stakes over 1200 metres at Hanshin on 21 December. After racing in mid-division for most of the way he produced a strong late run to take the lead in the last 50 metres and won by one and a quarter lengths from Azuma Shuttle.

In the official Japanese rankings for 2013, One And Only was rated the fourth-best juvenile colt (level with Isla Bonita), behind Asia Express Shonan Achieve and Win Full Bloom.

=== 2014: three-year-old season ===
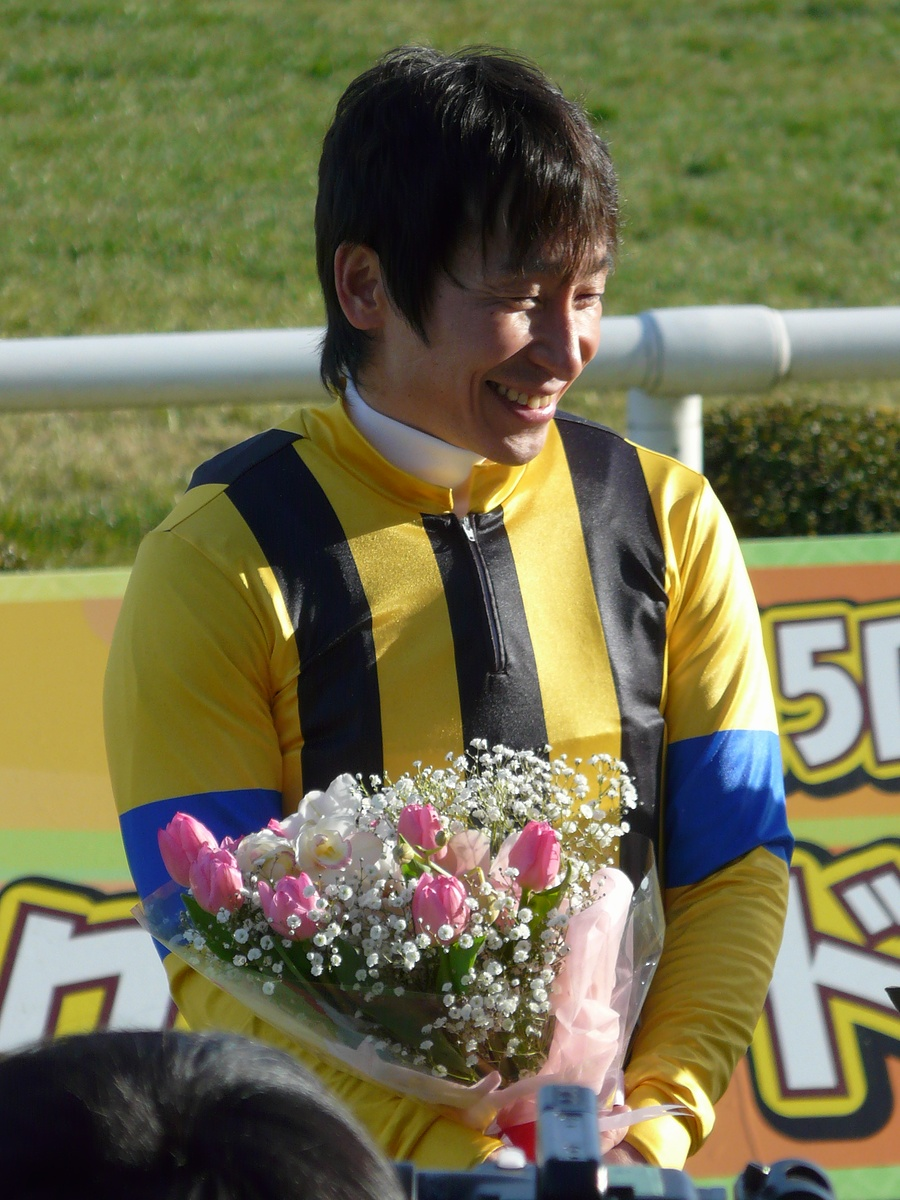
Norihiro Yokoyama, who rode One And Only in 2014

One And Only was ridden in all of his 2014 starts by Norihiro Yokoyama. He began his second season in the Yayoi Sho (a major trial race for the Satsuki Sho) over 2000 metres at Nakayama Racecourse on 9 March. Starting at odds of 8.8/1 he raced in mid-division before producing a strong late run on the outside but failed by a nose to catch the favourite To The World. Six weeks later, over the same course and distance, the colt started 5.7/1 for the Satsuki Sho. He was last of the eighteen runners for most of the way before finishing strongly to come home fourth behind Isla Bonita, To The World and Win Full Bloom, beaten less than two lengths by the winner.

On 1 June One And Only was stepped up in distance for the 81st running of the Japanese Derby over 2400 metres at Tokyo and was made the 4.6/1 third favourite behind Isla Bonita and To The World. The other thirteen runners included Red Reveur (Hanshin Juvenile Fillies), Hagino Hybrid (Kyoto Shimbun Hai) Meiner Frost (Mainichi Hai), Shonan Lagoon (Aoba Sho) and Tagano Grandpa (Falcon Stakes). One And Only settled in fifth place before moving into contention early in the straight and got the better of a sustained struggle with Isla Bonita to win by three quarters of a length with a length and a half back to Meiner Frost in third place. After the race Yokoyama said "The trainer and his staff conditioned him perfectly for the Derby. He was unable to make a good start in the previous race but he broke well today and I was able to race him in striking position. He is still immature compared to his sire, but he was able to win the Derby and I hope that he will continue to develop steadily".

After a break of almost four months One And Only returned to the track on 28 September for the Kobe Shimbun Hai (a trial race for the Kikuka Sho) over 2400 metres at Hanshin and started the odds-on favourite against fifteen opponents, the best fancied of whom were Satono Aladdin, Tosen Stardom (Kisaragi Sho), Win Full Bloom and Hagino Hybrid. After racing towards the rear he moved up on the outside on the final turn, took the lead in the straight and rallied after being overtaken by Sounds of Earth to regain the advantage and win by a head, with Toho Jackal a further head away in third. One And Only started favourite for the Kikuka Sho at Kyoto four weeks later but after racing on the outside for most of the way he was unable to make any progress in the straight and came home ninth behind Toho Jackal, beaten seven and a half lengths by the winner. On his two remaining races of 2014 the colt was matched against top class older horses but made little impact as he ran seventh behind Epiphaneia in the Japan Cup on 30 November and thirteenth behind Gentildonna in the Arima Kinen on 28 December.

In the 2014 World's Best Racehorse Rankings, One And Only was given a rating of 119, making him the 62nd best horse in the world. In January 2015 One And Only finished second Isla Bonita in the poll to determine the JRA Award for Best Three-Year-Old Colt, receiving 109 votes to his rival's 170.

=== 2015–2017: later career ===
One And Only began his third campaign with a trip to the United Arab Emirates to contest the Dubai Sheema Classic over 2400 metres at Meydan Racecourse. He produced one of his best performances as he took third place behind Dolniya and Flintshire with Designs On Rome, Just The Judge, Main Sequence and Harp Star running unplaced. He failed to reproduce his best form in five other races that year, finishing unplaced in the Takarazuka Kinen, Kyoto Daishoten, Tenno Sho, Japan Cup and Arima Kinen.

Kojiro Hashiguchi retired at the end of 2015 and One And Only was subsequently trained by Shinsuke Hashiguchi. The horse continued to race against top class opposition but never looked likely to win again, finishing unplaced in all six of his starts in 2016 and finishing no better than fifth in eight attempts in the following year.

== Racing form ==
One and Only won four races and placed on podium another four times out of 33 starts. This data is available based on JBIS, netkeiba and racingpost.

Date	Track	Race	Grade	Distance (Condition)	Entry	HN	Odds (Favored)	Finish	Time	Margins	Jockey	Winner (Runner-up)
2013 – two-year-old season
Aug 4	Kokura	2yo Newcomer		1,800 m (Firm)	16	13	51.5 (10)	12th	1:53.5	1.0	Yusaku Kokubun	Hunter Barows
Sep 7	Hanshin	2yo Maiden		1,600 m (Firm)	13	11	260.1 (13)	2nd	1:34.7	0.2	Yusaku Kokubun	Prokris
Sep 29	Hanshin	2yo Maiden		1,600 m (Firm)	18	6	3.0 (2)	1st	1:36.5	–0.1	Yusaku Kokubun	(Spinach)
Oct 26	Kyoto	Hagi Stakes	OP	1,800 m (Good)	9	4	18.7 (6)	2nd	1:48.4	0.0	Yusaku Kokubun	Delizia al Limone
Nov 16	Tokyo	Tokyo Sports Hai Nisai Stakes	3	1,800 m (Firm)	15	7	31.5 (8)	6th	1:46.3	0.4	Norihiro Yokoyama	Isla Bonita
Dec 21	Hanshin	Radio Nikkei Hai Nisai Stakes	3	2,000 m (Good)	16	1	13.7 (7)	1st	2:04.3	–0.2	Christophe Lemaire	(Azuma Shuttle)
2014 – three-year-old season
Mar 9	Nakayama	Yayoi Sho	2	2,000 m (Firm)	13	11	9.8 (4)	2nd	2:01.4	0.0	Norihiro Yokoyama	To the World
Apr 20	Nakayama	Satsuki Sho	1	2,000 m (Firm)	18	1	6.7 (4)	4th	1:59.9	0.3	Norihiro Yokoyama	Isla Bonita
Jun 1	Tokyo	Tokyo Yushun	1	2,400 m (Firm)	17	2	5.6 (3)	1st	2:24.6	–0.1	Norihiro Yokoyama	(Isla Bonita)
Sep 28	Hanshin	Kobe Shimbun Hai	2	2,400 m (Firm)	16	10	1.6 (1)	1st	2:24.4	0.0	Norihiro Yokoyama	(Sounds of Earth)
Oct 26	Kyoto	Kikuka Sho	1	3,000 m (Firm)	18	15	2.4 (1)	9th	3:02.2	1.2	Norihiro Yokoyama	Toho Jackal
Nov 30	Tokyo	Japan Cup	1	2,400 m (Firm)	18	10	14.3 (8)	7th	2:24.2	1.1	Norihiro Yokoyama	Epiphaneia
Dec 28	Nakayama	Arima Kinen	1	2,500 m (Firm)	16	3	11.8 (5)	13th	2:36.0	0.7	Norihiro Yokoyama	Gentildonna
2015 – four-year-old season
Mar 28	Meydan	Dubai Sheema Classic	1	2,410 m (Good)	9	6	16/1 (6)	3rd	2:29.1	0.8	Cristian Demuro	Dolniya
Jun 28	Hanshin	Takarazuka Kinen	1	2,200 m (Firm)	16	7	10.6 (4)	11th	2:15.1	0.7	Mirco Demuro	Lovely Day
Oct 12	Kyoto	Kyoto Daishoten	2	2,400 m (Firm)	10	2	6.1 (4)	6th	2:24.3	0.7	Christophe Lemaire	Lovely Day
Nov 1	Tokyo	Tenno Sho (Autumn)	1	2,000 m (Firm)	18	11	35.6 (11)	16th	1:59.5	1.1	Hiroyuki Uchida	Lovely Day
Nov 29	Tokyo	Japan Cup	1	2,400 m (Firm)	18	3	67.7 (13)	7th	2:25.0	0.3	Hiroyuki Uchida	Shonan Pandora
Dec 27	Nakayama	Arima Kinen	1	2,500 m (Firm)	16	8	30.4 (10)	9th	2:33.5	0.5	Suguru Hamanaka	Gold Actor
2016 – five-year-old season
Feb 14	Kyoto	Kyoto Kinen	2	2,200 m (Soft)	15	10	8.8 (5)	6th	2:19.1	1.4	Hiroyuki Uchida	Satono Crown
Mar 26	Meydan	Dubai Sheema Classic	1	2,410 m (Good)	9	5	100/1 (8)	5th	2:28.0	1.0	Yutaka Take	Postponed
Jun 26	Hanshin	Takarazuka Kinen	1	2,200 m (Good)	17	4	85.4 (13)	14th	2:14.8	2.0	Hironobu Tanabe	Marialite
Sep 25	Nakayama	Sankei Sho All Comers	2	2,200 m (Firm)	12	11	18.8 (5)	7th	2:12.3	0.4	Hiroyuki Uchida	Gold Actor
Nov 6	Tokyo	Copa Republica Argentina	2	2,500 m (Firm)	15	3	16.5 (7)	8th	2:34.0	0.6	Yuichi Shibayama	Cheval Grand
Nov 27	Tokyo	Japan Cup	1	2,400 m (Firm)	17	7	108.4 (14)	8th	2:26.6	0.8	Hironobu Tanabe	Kitasan Black
2017 – six-year-old season
Jan 22	Nakayama	American Jockey Club Cup	2	2,200 m (Firm)	17	7	12.5 (6)	5th	2:12.5	0.6	Hironobu Tanabe	Tanta Alegria
Mar 19	Hanshin	Hanshin Daishoten	2	3,000 m (Firm)	10	7	19.6 (3)	7th	3:05.0	2.4	Yutaka Take	Satono Diamond
Apr 30	Kyoto	Tenno Sho (Spring)	1	3,200 m (Firm)	17	14	113.9 (11)	11th	3:14.1	1.6	Ryuji Wada	Kitasan Black
May 28	Tokyo	Meguro Kinen	2	2,500 m (Firm)	18	15	18.5 (7)	10th	2:31.8	0.9	Norihiro Yokoyama	Fame Game
Jul 23	Chukyo	Chukyo Kinen	3	1,600 m (Firm)	16	7	11.5 (7)	10th	1:34.3	1.1	Norihiro Yokoyama	Win Gagnant
Oct 8	Tokyo	Mainichi Okan	2	1,800 m (Firm)	12	10	105.8 (10)	7th	1:46.0	0.4	Norihiro Yokoyama	Real Steel
Oct 29	Tokyo	Tenno Sho (Autumn)	1	2,000 m (Heavy)	18	17	135.5 (16)	17th	2:16.3	8.0	Norihiro Yokoyama	Kitasan Black
Nov 26	Tokyo	Japan Cup	1	2,400 m (Firm)	17	15	280.8 (15)	16th	2:25.7	2.0	Norihiro Yokoyama	Cheval Grand

Legend:
Turf

== Stud record ==
After he was retired from racing at the end of 2017, One And Only began his career as a breeding stallion at the Arrow Stud in Hokkaido.

== Pedigree ==
Pedigree of One And Only (JPN), bay horse, 2011
Sire Heart's Cry (JPN) 2001	Sunday Silence (USA); 1986	Halo	Hail to Reason
Sire Heart's Cry (JPN) 2001	Sunday Silence (USA); 1986	Halo	Cosmah
Sire Heart's Cry (JPN) 2001	Sunday Silence (USA); 1986	Wishing Well	Understanding
Sire Heart's Cry (JPN) 2001	Sunday Silence (USA); 1986	Wishing Well	Mountain Flower
Sire Heart's Cry (JPN) 2001	Irish Dance (JPN); 1990	Tony Bin (IRE)	Kampala (GB)
Sire Heart's Cry (JPN) 2001	Irish Dance (JPN); 1990	Tony Bin (IRE)	Severn Bridge (GB)
Sire Heart's Cry (JPN) 2001	Irish Dance (JPN); 1990	Buper Dance (USA)	Lyphard
Sire Heart's Cry (JPN) 2001	Irish Dance (JPN); 1990	Buper Dance (USA)	My Bupers
Dam Virtue (JPN) 2002	Taiki Shuttle (USA); 1994	Devil's Bag	Halo
Dam Virtue (JPN) 2002	Taiki Shuttle (USA); 1994	Devil's Bag	Ballade
Dam Virtue (JPN) 2002	Taiki Shuttle (USA); 1994	Welsh Muffin (IRE)	Caerleon (USA)
Dam Virtue (JPN) 2002	Taiki Shuttle (USA); 1994	Welsh Muffin (IRE)	Muffitys (GB)
Dam Virtue (JPN) 2002	Saint Amour (JPN); 1996	Danzig (USA)	Northern Dancer (CAN)
Dam Virtue (JPN) 2002	Saint Amour (JPN); 1996	Danzig (USA)	Pas de Nom
Dam Virtue (JPN) 2002	Saint Amour (JPN); 1996	Ambrosine (USA)	Mr. Prospector
Dam Virtue (JPN) 2002	Saint Amour (JPN); 1996	Ambrosine (USA)	Barada (Family: A4)

- One And Only was inbred 3 × 4 to Halo, meaning that this stallion appears in both the third and fourth generations of his pedigree
