= JRA Award for Best Older Male Horse =

Japanese thoroughbred horse racing award

The JRA Award for Best Older Male Horse (Japanese: JRA賞最優秀4歳以上牡馬, Hepburn: Jei Āru Ei Shō Sai Yūshū Yonsai Ijō Boba) is a title awarded annually by the Japan Racing Association (JRA) to an outstanding horse of that category in Thoroughbred horse racing in Japan. Since 1987 the honor has been part of the JRA Awards.

== Records ==
Most successful horse (2 wins):

- Orfevre – 2012, 2013
- Kitasan Black – 2016, 2017

== Winners ==
| Year | Horse | Trainer | Owner | Age |
|---|---|---|---|---|
| 1987 | Nippo Teio | Kinzo Kubotu | Yuichi Yamaichi | 4 |
| 1988 | Tamamo Cross | Isami Obara | Tamamo Inc. | 4 |
| 1989 | Inari One | Kiyoshi Suzuki | Hiroki Hotehama | 5 |
| 1990 | Oguri Cap | Tsutomu Setoguchi | Shunsuke Kondo | 5 |
| 1991 | Mejiro McQueen | Yasuo Ikee | Mejiro Shoji Co | 4 |
| 1992 | Mejiro Palmer | Masaki Okubo | Mejiro Shoji Co | 5 |
| 1993 | Yamanin Zephyr | Yusuke Kurita | Hajime Doi | 5 |
| 1994 | Biwa Hayahide | Mitsumasa Hamada | Biwa Co., Ltd. | 4 |
| 1995 | Sakura Chitose O | Katsutaro Sakai | Sakura Commerce | 5 |
| 1996 | Sakura Laurel | Katsutaro Sakai | Sakura Commerce | 5 |
| 1997 | Marvelous Sunday | Makoto Osawa | Sadao Sasahara | 4 |
| 1998 | Taiki Shuttle | Kazuo Fujisawa | Taiki Farm | 4 |
| 1999 | El Condor Pasa | Yoshitaka Ninomiya | Takashi Watanabe | 4 |
| 2000 | T M Opera O | Ichizo Iwamoto | Masatsugu Takezono | 4 |
| 2001 | Agnes Digital | Toshiaki Shirai | Takao Watanabe | 4 |
| 2002 | Manhattan Cafe | Futoshi Kojima | Ken Nishikawa | 4 |
| 2003 | Symboli Kris S | Kazuo Fujisawa | Symboli Stud | 4 |
| 2004 | Zenno Rob Roy | Kazuo Fujisawa | Shinobu Osako | 4 |
| 2005 | Heart's Cry | Kojiro Hashiguchi | Shadai Race Horse Co | 4 |
| 2006 | Deep Impact | Yasuo Ikee | Kaneko Makoto Holdings Co., Ltd. | 4 |
| 2007 | Admire Moon | Hiroyoshi Matsuda | Darley Japan Farm Co., Ltd. | 4 |
| 2008 | Screen Hero | Yuichi Shikato | Teruya Yoshida | 4 |
| 2009 | Dream Journey | Yasutoshi Ikee | Sunday Racing | 5 |
| 2010 | Nakayama Festa | Yoshitaka Ninomiya | Shinichi Izumi | 4 |
| 2011 | Victoire Pisa | Katsuhiko Sumii | Yoshimi Ichikawa | 4 |
| 2012 | Orfevre | Yasutoshi Ikee | Sunday Racing Co. | 4 |
| 2013 | Orfevre | Yasutoshi Ikee | Sunday Racing Co. | 5 |
| 2014 | Just A Way | Naosuke Sugai | Akatsuki Yamatoya | 5 |
| 2015 | Lovely Day | Yasutoshi Ikee | Makoto Kaneko | 5 |
| 2016 | Kitasan Black | Hisashi Shimizu | Ono Shoji | 4 |
| 2017 | Kitasan Black | Hisashi Shimizu | Ono Shoji | 5 |
| 2018 | Rey de Oro | Kazuo Fujisawa | U Carrot Farm | 4 |
| 2019 | Win Bright | Yoshihiro Hatakeyama | Win Co. Ltd | 5 |
| 2020 | Fierement | Takahisa Tezuka | Sunday Racing Co. | 5 |
| 2021 | Contrail | Yoshito Yahagi | Shinji Maeda | 4 |
| 2022 | Titleholder | Toru Kurita | Hiroshi Yamada | 4 |
| 2023 | Equinox | Tetsuya Kimura | Silk Racing | 4 |
| 2024 | Do Deuce | Yasuo Tomomichi | Kieffers Co. Ltd. | 5 |
| 2025 | Forever Young | Yoshito Yahagi | Susumu Fujita | 4 |
