= Lovely Day (horse) =

Japanese-bred Thoroughbred racehorse

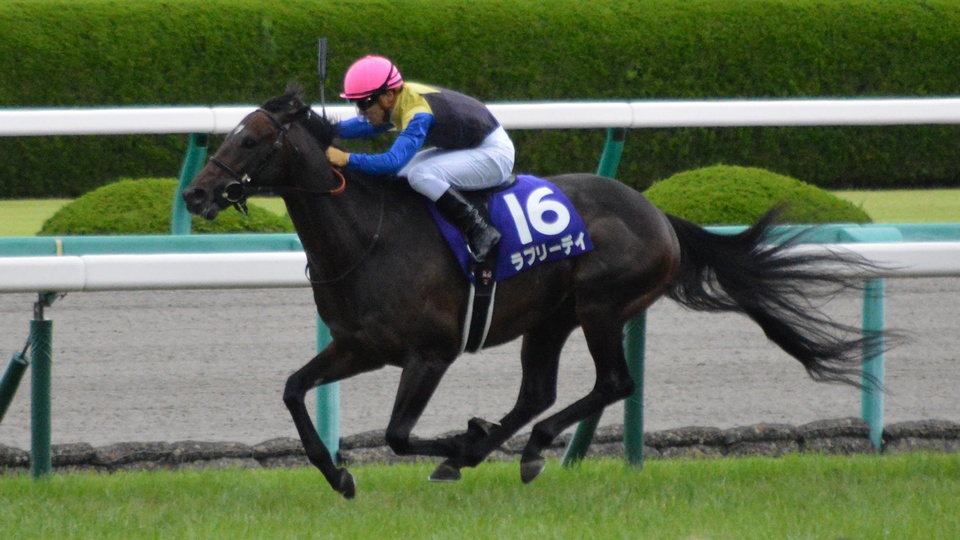
- Sire: King Kamehameha
- Grandsire: Kingmambo
- Dam: Popcorn Jazz
- Damsire: Dance in the Dark
- Sex: Stallion
- Foaled: 30 January 2010
- Country: Japan
- Colour: Dark bay or Brown
- Breeder: Northern Farm
- Owner: Makoto Kaneko
- Racing colours
- Trainer: Yasutoshi Ikee
- Jockey: Yuga Kawada
- Record: 33: 9-3-3
- Earnings: ¥838,031,400

Major wins
- Nakayama Kimpai (2015); Naruo Kinen (2015); Kyoto Kinen (2015); Takarazuka Kinen (2015); Kyoto Daishoten (2015); Tenno Sho (Autumn) (2015)

Awards
- JRA Award for Best Older Male Horse (2015)
- Last updated on 17 February 2026

Lovely Day (Japanese: ラブリーデイ, Hepburn: Raburī Dei; foaled 30 January 2010) is a Japanese retired Thoroughbred racehorse and breeding stallion. After winning his first two races as a two-year-old, the horse recorded only one win from fifteen starts over the next two years. In 2015 however, he showed marked improvement to become one of the best horses in Japan, winning six races including the Takarazuka Kinen and the autumn edition of the Tenno Sho. He was voted Best Older Male Horse in the JRA Awards for 2015.

== Background ==
Lovely Day is a dark bay or brown horse with a white star bred in Japan at Northern Farm by his owner Makoto Kaneko. His sire, King Kamehameha was one of the best Japanese colts of his generation, beating a field including Heart's Cry and Daiwa Major in the 2004 Japanese Derby. His other winners as a breeding stallion include Lord Kanaloa, Rose Kingdom (Japan Cup), Belshazzar (Japan Cup Dirt), Rulership (Queen Elizabeth II Cup) and Apapane. Lovely Day's dam won one race, the Listed Sweetpea Stakes from five starts in 2002 and 2003. The colt was sent into training with Yasutoshi Ikee, previously best known for handling Orfevre.

== Racing career ==
=== 2012: two-year-old season ===
Lovely Day began his racing career by winning a maiden race over 1800 metres at Kokura Racecourse on 19 August 2012. Four weeks later at Hanshin Racecourse he followed up in the Nojigiku Stakes over the same distance, beating Sammaru Home. In November he was dropped in distance but moved up in class for the Grade II Keio Hai Nisai Stakes over 1400 metres at Tokyo Racecourse and finished second of the sixteen runners behind A Shin Top. On his final appearance of the season the colt contested Japan's most prestigious race for juveniles, the Grade I Asahi Hai Futurity Stakes over 1600 metres at Nakayama Racecourse in December and finished seventh, four and a half lengths behind Logotype.

=== 2013: three-year-old season ===
As a three-year-old in 2013, Lovely Day failed to win in seven starts. After finishing fifth in the Grade III Arlington Cup on his seasonal debut he finished down the field in the Grade III Mainichi Hai and the Grade I Satsuki Sho before running seventh behind Kizuna in the Tokyo Yushun. He was then matched against older horses and finished second to the six-year-old Meisho Naruto in a handicap race at Kokura in August. After a three-month break he returned to finish second to Curren Mirotic in the Grade II Kinko Sho at Chukyo Racecourse and ended his season by finishing twelfth behind his stablemate Orfevre in the Arima Kinen.

=== 2014: four-year-old season ===
Lovely Day began his third season by finishing third in the Group III Chunichi Shimbun Hai at Chukyo. He was then dropped in class and recorded his first victory in nineteen months when he won the Metropolitan Stakes over 2400 metres at Tokyo on 26 April. The horse failed to reach the first three in his remaining four races that year: he finished fifth in a handicap at Tokyo in June, sixth in a similar event at Fukushima Racecourse in July, fifth at Tokyo in November and fourth to Last Impact in the Kinko Sho in December.

=== 2015: five-year-old season ===
Having won only one minor race in the last two seasons, Lovely Day began the 2015 season in the Grade III Nakayama Kimpai over 2000 metres at Nakayama on 4 January. Ridden by the Irish jockey Fran Berry he recorded his first important victory as he defeated Logotype by one and a quarter lengths in a record time of 1:57.80. On 15 February at Kyoto Racecourse he started third favourite behind Harp Star and Kizuna in the Grade II Kyōto Kinen over 2200 metres. Ridden for the only time by Keita Tosaki he overtook the pace-setting Suzuka Devious to win by a nose, with Kizuna a neck away in third. His trainer commented "This was an ideal race for him today. He got a smooth run after a good break, and held on during a strong duel". In his next two races he finished sixth behind Gold Ship in the Hanshin Daishoten and eighth behind the same horse in the spring edition of the Tenno Sho.

On 6 June Lovely Day was partnered by Yasunari Iwata when he contested the Naruo Kinen over 2000 metres at Hanshin and started 3/1 second favourite behind the six-year-old Air Saumur who had won the race in the previous year. He won by two lengths from Majesty Hearts, with Azuma Shuttle taking third ahead of Air Saumur. Twenty-two days after his win in the Naruo Kinen, Lovely Day returned to Grade I class for the first time since 2012 when he contested one of Japan's most prestigious races, the Takarazuka Kinen over 2200 metres at Hanshin. Gold Ship started favourite ahead of Lachesis (Queen Elizabeth II Commemorative Cup), Nuovo Record (Yushun Himba), One And Only (Tokyo Yushun) and Curren Mirotic (Kinko Sho) with Lovely Day the 13.2/1 sixth choice in a sixteen-runner field. The other runners included the 2014 Kikuka Sho winner Toho Jackal. Ridden by Yuga Kawada, he overcame a wide draw to take the lead 200 metres from the finish and recorded his first success at the highest level as he won by a neck from the five-year-old mare Denim And Ruby with the outsider Shonan Pandora taking third ahead of Toho Jackal. After the race Kawada commented "I was able to position him behind the front-runner with ease, as the pace was slow, and tried to race him with good rhythm. I was a bit worried about the track, but he responded really well. I was aware of the mare closing in and prayed that he could fend her off".

After a summer break, Lovely Day returned to action in the Grade II Kyōto Daishōten on 12 October. He was again partnered by Kawada and started 2.1/1 favourite against nine opponents. Lachesis, One And Only and Curren Mirotic were again in opposition, but his most serious rival in the betting was Sounds of Earth who had finished runner-up to Toho Jackal in the Kikuka Sho. Lovely Day recorded his third consecutive victory as he won by one and a quarter lengths from Sounds of Earth, with Curren Mirotic half a lengths away in third. On 1 November Lovely Day, ridden by Suguru Hamanaka started 2.4/1 favourite for the autumn edition of the Tenno Sho over 2000 metres at Tokyo Racecourse. Old rivals in the field were Shonan Pandora, Last Impact, One And Only and Curren Mirotic whilst the other contenders included A Shin Hikari (Mainichi Okan), Decipher (Sapporo Kinen), Isla Bonita (2014 Japanese champion three-year-old colt), Spielberg (winner of the race in 2014) and the three-year-olds Ambitious and Satono Crown (third to Duramente in the Tokyo Yushun). Lovely Day raced in fourth before moving forward on the final turn and taking the lead in the straight. He defeated the fast-finishing outsider Staphanos by half a length, with Isla Bonita taking third ahead of Shonan Pandora and Ambitious. His trainer Ikee commented "We still have future races to think about so he wasn't completely tuned up, but for a second autumn start, he was in good form. The horse has developed beautifully and has entered his prime. We have the Japan Cup in mind as his next start. We'll carefully prepare him race by race".

For his last two races of the season, Lovely Day was stepped up in distance to contest the Japan Cup over 2400 metres and the Arima Kinen over 2500 metres. In the Japan Cup at Tokyo Racecourse on 29 November he started favourite in an eighteen-runner field which included challengers from France, Britain and Germany. In a closely contested finish he was beaten into third place by Shonan Pandora and Last Impact. In the Arima Kinen on 27 December he started second choice in the betting behind Gold Ship. In another close finish he came home in fifth place behind Gold Actor, Sounds of Earth, Kitasan Black and Marialite, beaten less than two lengths by the winner.

=== 2016: six-year-old season ===
Lovely Day remained in training at six and began his campaign in the Sankei Osaka Hai on 3 April. He started the 2/1 favourite and finished fourth behind Ambitious, Kitasan Black and Shonan Pandora. He was then sent to Hong Kong for the Queen Elizabeth II Cup on 24 April and started the 1.9/1 favourite. He was sent into the lead from the start by the locally based jockey João Moreira but was overtaken in the straight and finished fourth behind Werther, Military Attack and Blazing Speed. Lovely Day returned to Japan and in June he attempted to repeat his 2015 success in the Takarazuka Kinen. Starting at odds of 10.6/1 he tracked the leaders for most of the way but was unable to quicken in the straight and finished fourth behind Marialite, Duramente and Kitasan Black.

After the summer break, Lovely Day returned in the Kyoto Daishoten on 10 October and finished a close third behind Kitasan Black and Admire Deus. In the Tenno Sho he ran disappointingly and came home unplaced. On his final start he ran for the second time at Sha Tin Racecourse in Hong Kong and finished fourth to Beauty Only in the Hong Kong Cup on 11 December.

== Assessment and awards ==
In the 2015 JRA Awards Lovely Day was nominated in two categories. In the poll for Japanese Horse of the Year he received 55 votes, making him runner-up to the miler Maurice. He did however, beat Maurice by 174 votes to 114 to take the title of Best Older Male Horse. In the 2015 World's Best Racehorse Rankings Lovely Day was given a rating of 121, making him the 27th best racehorse in the world.

== Racing form ==
Lovely Day won nine races and scored six podium finishes in 33 starts. This data is based on JBIS, netkeiba and HKJC.

Date	Track	Race	Grade	Distance (Condition)	Entry	HN	Odds (Favored)	Finish	Time	Margins	Jockey	Winner (Runner-up)
2012 – two-year-old season
Apr 19	Kokura	2yo Newcomer		1,800 m (Firm)	14	13	10.1 (3)	1st	1:51.3	–0.1	Yuga Kawada	(Mikki Success)
Sep 16	Hanshin	Nojigiku Stakes	OP	1,800 m (Firm)	6	5	3.4 (2)	1st	1:47.7	0.0	Yuga Kawada	(Sammaru Home)
Nov 10	Tokyo	Keio Hai Nisai Stakes	2	1,400 m (Firm)	16	1	16.6 (7)	2nd	1:23.3	0.1	Yuga Kawada	A Shin Top
Dec 16	Hanshin	Asahi Hai Futurity Stakes	1	1,600 m (Firm)	16	6	16.2 (4)	7th	1:34.0	0.6	Christophe Lemaire	Logotype
2013 – three-year-old season
Feb 23	Hanshin	Arlington Cup	3	1,600 m (Firm)	10	7	5.7 (3)	5th	1:35.6	0.8	Yasunari Iwata	Copano Richard
Mar 23	Hanshin	Mainichi Hai	3	1,800 m (Firm)	13	11	12.7 (4)	11th	1:48.4	2.2	Dario Vargiu	Kizuna
Apr 14	Nakayama	Satsuki Sho	1	2,000 m (Firm)	18	13	231.0 (17)	15th	1:59.9	1.9	Suguru Hamanaka	Logotype
May 26	Tokyo	Tokyo Yushun	1	2,400 m (Firm)	18	6	238.2 (17)	7th	2:24.7	0.4	Yuga Kawada	Kizuna
Aug 4	Kokura	Kokura Kinen	3	2,000 m (Good)	15	6	8.2 (5)	2nd	1:57.3	0.2	Yuga Kawada	Meisho Naruto
Nov 30	Chukyo	Kinko Sho	2	2,000 m (Firm)	14	13	9.4 (6)	2nd	2:00.0	0.4	Masayoshi Ebina	Curren Mirotic
Dec 22	Nakayama	Arima Kinen	1	2,500 m (Firm)	16	8	81.1 (14)	12th	2:35.5	3.2	Masayoshi Ebina	Orfevre
2014 – four-year-old season
Mar 15	Chukyo	Chunichi Shimbun Hai	3	2,000 m (Firm)	18	13	11.8 (4)	3rd	2:01.7	0.0	Eduardo Pedroza	Martinborough
Apr 26	Tokyo	Metropolitan Stakes	OP	2,400 m (Firm)	11	8	3.0 (1)	1st	2:25.2	–0.3	Andrasch Starke	(Promontorio)
Jun 1	Tokyo	Meguro Kinen	2	2,500 m (Firm)	16	7	2.5 (1)	5th	2:31.2	0.2	Yuga Kawada	Meiner Medalist
Jul 13	Fukushima	Tanabata Sho	3	2,000 m (Firm)	16	15	4.0 (2)	6th	1:59.5	0.8	Yuga Kawada	Meisho Naruto
Nov 9	Tokyo	Copa Republica Argentina	2	2,500 m (Firm)	18	17	9.2 (6)	5th	2:31.3	0.8	Ryan Moore	Fame Game
Dec 6	Chukyo	Kinko Sho	2	2,000 m (Firm)	17	16	11.9 (6)	4th	1:59.3	0.5	Hideaki Miyuki	Last Impact
2015 – five-year-old season
Jan 4	Nakayama	Nakayama Kimpai	3	2,000 m (Firm)	17	2	6.1 (4)	1st	R1:57.8	–0.2	Fran Berry	(Logotype)
Feb 15	Kyoto	Kyoto Kinen	2	2,200 m (Firm)	11	6	8.5 (3)	1st	2:11.5	0.0	Keita Tosaki	(Suzuka Devious)
Mar 22	Hanshin	Hanshin Daishoten	2	3,000 m (Firm)	10	7	7.3 (3)	6th	3:07.5	1.6	Andrasch Starke	Gold Ship
May 3	Kyoto	Tennō Shō (Spring)	1	3,200 m (Firm)	17	10	24.9 (8)	8th	3:15.2	0.5	Christophe Lemaire	Gold Ship
Jun 6	Hanshin	Naruo Kinen	3	2,000 m (Firm)	11	10	4.0 (2)	1st	1:58.8	–0.3	Yasunari Iwata	(Majesty Hearts)
Jun 28	Hanshin	Takarazuka Kinen	1	2,200 m (Firm)	16	16	14.2 (6)	1st	2:14.4	0.0	Yuga Kawada	(Denim and Ruby)
Oct 12	Kyoto	Kyoto Daishoten	2	2,400 m (Firm)	10	1	3.1 (1)	1st	2:23.6	–0.2	Yuga Kawada	(Sounds of Earth)
Nov 1	Tokyo	Tennō Shō (Autumn)	1	2,000 m (Firm)	18	8	3.4 (1)	1st	1:58.4	–0.1	Suguru Hamanaka	(Staphanos)
Nov 29	Tokyo	Japan Cup	1	2,400 m (Firm)	18	1	2.7 (1)	3rd	2:24.8	0.1	Yuga Kawada	Shonan Pandora
Dec 27	Nakayama	Arima Kinen	1	2,500 m (Firm)	16	4	4.5 (2)	5th	2:33.2	0.2	Yuga Kawada	Gold Actor
2016 – six-year-old season
Apr 3	Hanshin	Sankei Osaka Hai	2	2,000 m (Firm)	11	2	3.0 (1)	4th	1:59.7	0.4	Mirco Demuro	Ambitious
Apr 24	Sha Tin	QEII Cup	1	2,000 m (Good)	13	3	2.9 (1)	4th	2:02.3	1.0	Joao Moreira	Werther
Jun 26	Hanshin	Takarazuka Kinen	1	2,200 m (Good)	17	7	10.6 (4)	4th	2:13.0	0.2	Christophe Lemaire	Marialite
Oct 10	Kyoto	Kyoto Daishoten	2	2,400 m (Firm)	10	10	4.4 (2)	3rd	2:25.6	0.1	Christophe Lemaire	Kitasan Black
Oct 30	Tokyo	Tennō Shō (Autumn)	1	2,000 m (Firm)	15	15	11.1 (5)	9th	2:00.3	1.0	Christophe Lemaire	Maurice
Dec 11	Sha Tin	Hong Kong Cup	1	2,000 m (Firm)	12	6	21.6 (7)	4th	2:01.5	1.4	Hugh Bowman	Maurice

Legend:
Turf

- R indicated that it was a record time finish

== Stud record ==
At the end of his racing career, Lovely Day was retired to become a breeding stallion at the Breeders Stallion Station in Hokkaido. In his first season at stud, he sired 101 registered foals. As of 2026, the only graded stakes winner to be sired by Lovely Day is Gruner Green who won the Kyoto Nisai Stakes in 2022.

== Pedigree ==
Pedigree of Lovely Day (JPN), bay or brown horse, 2010
Sire King Kamehameha (JPN) 2001	Kingmambo (USA); 1990	Mr. Prospector	Raise a Native
Sire King Kamehameha (JPN) 2001	Kingmambo (USA); 1990	Mr. Prospector	Gold Digger
Sire King Kamehameha (JPN) 2001	Kingmambo (USA); 1990	Miesque	Nureyev
Sire King Kamehameha (JPN) 2001	Kingmambo (USA); 1990	Miesque	Pasadoble
Sire King Kamehameha (JPN) 2001	Manfath (IRE); 1991	Last Tycoon	Try My Best
Sire King Kamehameha (JPN) 2001	Manfath (IRE); 1991	Last Tycoon	Mill Princess
Sire King Kamehameha (JPN) 2001	Manfath (IRE); 1991	Pilot Bird	Blakeney
Sire King Kamehameha (JPN) 2001	Manfath (IRE); 1991	Pilot Bird	The Dancer
Dam Popcorn Jazz (JPN) 2000	Dance in the Dark (JPN); 1993	Sunday Silence	Halo
Dam Popcorn Jazz (JPN) 2000	Dance in the Dark (JPN); 1993	Sunday Silence	Wishing Well
Dam Popcorn Jazz (JPN) 2000	Dance in the Dark (JPN); 1993	Dancing Key	Nijinsky
Dam Popcorn Jazz (JPN) 2000	Dance in the Dark (JPN); 1993	Dancing Key	Key Partner
Dam Popcorn Jazz (JPN) 2000	Grace Rumor (JPN); 1994	Tony Bin	Kampala
Dam Popcorn Jazz (JPN) 2000	Grace Rumor (JPN); 1994	Tony Bin	Severn Bridge
Dam Popcorn Jazz (JPN) 2000	Grace Rumor (JPN); 1994	Disk Jockey	Real Shadai
Dam Popcorn Jazz (JPN) 2000	Grace Rumor (JPN); 1994	Disk Jockey	Shadai Chatter (family: 19)
