= Toho Jackal =

Japanese-bred Thoroughbred racehorse

Toho Jackal トーホウジャッカル
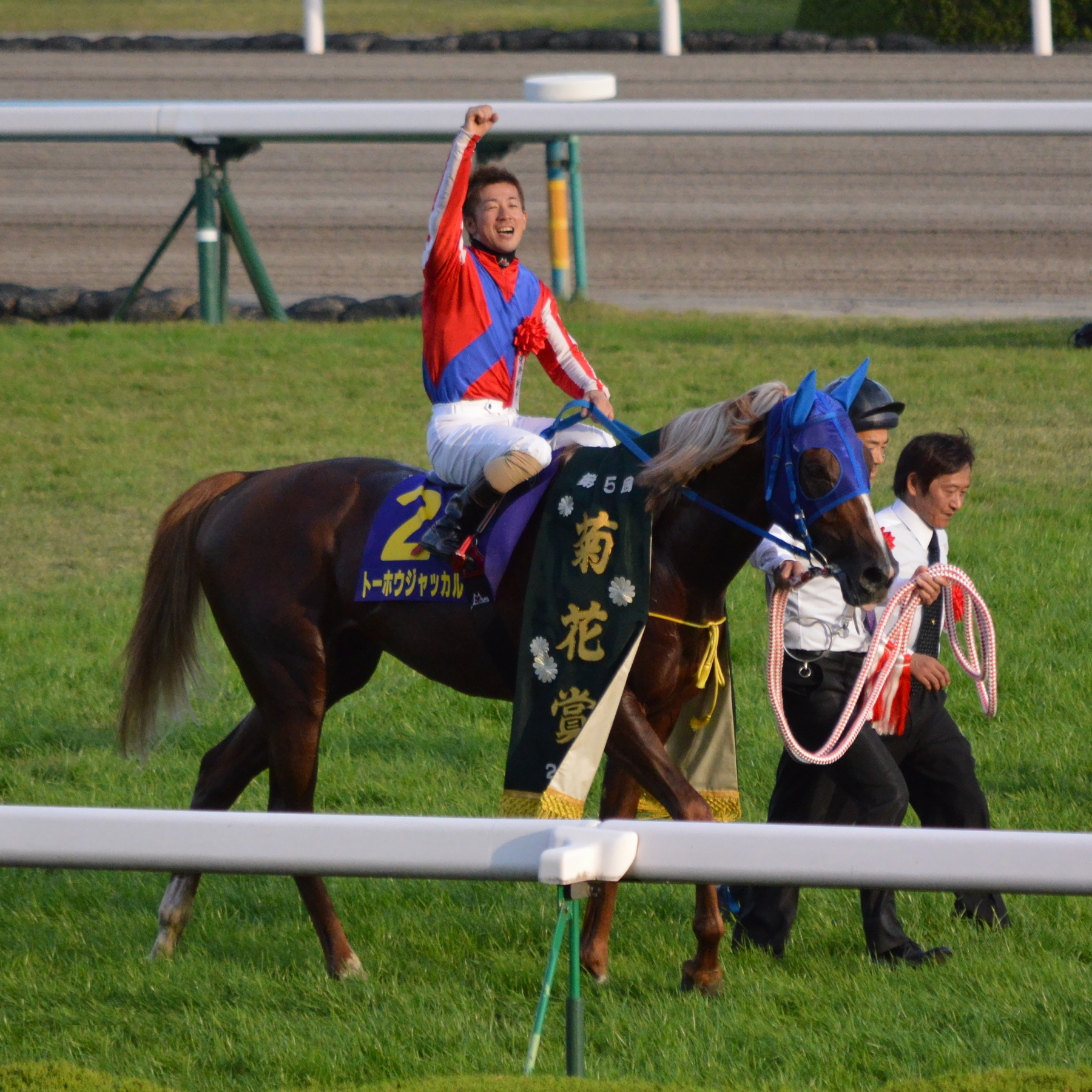
- Toho Jackal after winning the Kikuka Sho at Kyoto Racecourse
- Sire: Special Week
- Grandsire: Sunday Silence
- Dam: Toho Gaia
- Damsire: Unbridled's Song
- Sex: Stallion
- Foaled: 11 March 2011
- Country: Japan
- Colour: Chestnut
- Breeder: Koji Takeshima
- Owner: Toho Bussan Co. Ltd.
- Racing colours
- Trainer: Kiyoshi Tani
- Jockey: Manabu Sakai
- Record: 13: 3-1-1
- Earnings: 213,280,000 ¥

Major wins
- Japanese Classic Race wins: Kikuka Sho (2014)

Toho Jackal (Japanese: トーホウジャッカル, Hepburn: Tōhō Jakkaru; foaled 11 March 2011) is a Japanese Thoroughbred racehorse and sire. He was famous for winning the 2014 Kikuka Sho, which was only 149 days from his debut and set up the current record time for the race. He was also born on the same day as the 2011 Tōhoku earthquake and tsunami disaster. In all circumstances involving his birthday, his instant debut and his record win in Kikuka Sho, Toho Jackal was dubbed as a Miracle Horse by the commentators and fans.

== Background ==
Toho Jackal was foaled out of Toho Gaia, a mare who won nine races out of 20 starts that was sired by Unbridled's Song, who won the 1995 Breeders' Cup Juvenile and 1996 Florida Derby. His sire is Special Week, who triumphed in the 1998 Tokyo Yushun and 1999 Japan Cup. Special Week himself was sired by the most prominent leading sire in Japan, Sunday Silence.

In his yearling days, he was known as a frail horse. He was struck by pneumonia and enteritis due to viral infections. He was hospitalized for 19 days before recovering but lost more than 50 kg in the process. Thus, a bulk up plan was devised by his trainer Tani until he fully recovered from the aftermath. His name came from the prefix Toho which was derived from Toho Bussan and also Jackal.

== Racing career ==
=== 2014: three-year-old season ===
Toho Jackal made his debut on 31 May 2014 which was one day before the Tokyo Yushun in a 1800 metres race at the Kyoto Racecourse. Manabu Sakai rode him for this race which eventually turned up to be his main jockey. He finished badly in tenth place for his debut but Sakai felt that this horse has an extraordinary closing burst. He failed to perform well for the next race on dirt with different jockey as he ended up in ninth place. In his third race at the Chukyo turf, alongside with Sakai again, Toho Jackal broke from the pack and surged forward for his first win by a nose. He maintained this performance for his fourth race as he broke away in the straight, winning by 1 and a quarter lengths to secure its second consecutive victory at the Kokura Racecourse. He ran once again in Kokura at Genkai Tokubetsu. The pair stick to the plan of how they usually ran in previous two wins but this time they only scored second place by a neck at the line.

By 28 September, Toho Jackal joined his first graded stakes races which was the Kobe Shimbun Hai, a 2400 metres trial race for the Kikuka Sho. Toho Jackal was the ninth favourite for this race at 63.6 odds, whereas the favourite would be the reigning Tokyo Yushun winner, One and Only and Satono Aladdin. When the gates open, Toho Jackal positioned himself on the middle pack for the early phase. In the final straight, he tried to sneak in between One and Only and Sounds of Earth but was boxed and dragged to the outside track. Unfazed on that condition, Toho Jackal picked up speed and manage to chase down both of them as they were finishing the race side by side in the end. Toho Jackal lost to both of them and finished in third place just a head behind Sounds of Earth and two heads behind One and Only, the winner of the race.

The third-place finished in the Kobe Shimbun Hai earned Toho Jackal the priority rights to the Kikuka Sho. Before the race, he was picked as the third favourite at 6.9 odds to win behind One and Only and To the World. After breaking from post 2 in the race, Toho Jackal was positioned in fifth on the rail, stalking the early pace and biding his time into the final turn. Sakai angled him wide into stretch right at the final corner after the final uphill to rally and he dueled with Sounds of Earth until the 200-meter mark, where he found another gear to secure the victory. This win was monumental for Toho Jackal as with this win he had:

- Won his first graded stakes just 149 days after debut (breaking Oken Bruce Lee record previously at 183 days)
- Broke the race speed record which clocked at 3 minutes and 1 seconds, an improvement of 1.7 seconds over previous record holder, Song of Wind back in 2006 which was the biggest improvement of the race. This is still the competition's speed record as of 2026.
- Broke the previous 3000 metres race speed record in Japan, set by Narita Top Road at the 2001 Hanshin Daishoten by 1.5 seconds.
- Became the first Special Week's colt that win a JRA G1 race. Special Week himself lost this race against Seiun Sky back in 1998.

This win was also the second grade 1 win for Manabu Sakai since the 2011 Japan Cup Dirt with Nihonpiro Ours. It was also the owner's (Toho Bussan) first grade 1 win ever. The chairman, Teruo Takahashi denoted that they were closed back in 2000 at the very same race in which Air Shakur beat Toho Shiden to the line. He also felt very emotional on the win and did not expected that Toho Jackal would be the winning horse as he debut so late compared to his peers.

=== 2015–2017: later seasons ===
After winning the Kikuka Sho, Toho Jackal was rested for the next year campaign as he was racing in quite tight scheduled leading up to that big race. This break was really important as Sakai suspected that this horse was at its mental limit break as he was thrashing around in the starting gate at that race. The team planned to start him at the Hanshin Daishoten but withdrew due to an injury on his right foreleg hoof. He only managed to return at the Takarazuka Kinen in June. When the race began, Toho Jackal positioned himself wide in the middle pack. He charged well on the later half and sped up after the uphill climb to finish fourth. In August, Toho Jackal raced in the Sapporo Kinen. He was marking the eventual winner, Decipher at the leading pack but gassed out, slowed down to finish in eighth place. Sakai admitted that his aggressive approach on the race might be the reason why Toho Jackal failed to accelerate well at the final phase. A fatigue in his fetlock caused him to miss the Tenno Sho (Autumn) and the team prepared him for the next year Tenno Sho (Spring) instead.

At the first half of the 2016, He ran in the Hanshin Daishoten and also Tenno Sho (Spring) as planned. For the former, Toho Jackal sat well on the third position most of the race but lost the pace at the final straight and placed seventh on the day. Meanwhile, the second race after was better for him as he raced in the middle pack and advanced well to the leading pack after the third corner for the final burst at the homestretch. He was competing alongside Cheval Grand and Kitasan Black for the win until he lost pace 100 metres from the line and finished in fifth place. For the next race at the Takarazuka Kinen, Toho Jackal ran mostly on pace at the front group, mainly in third position. Unfortunately, at the final 300 metres, he was blocked by traffic and lost momentum which he ended up in 15th-place. He closed the season with a run at the Kinko Sho at Chukyo. He was never in the contention for this one where he lied mostly in ninth position, blocked by the middle pack and finished in 11th-place.

For the next year, the team proposed him for the Nikkei Shinshun Hai. Sadly, he was diagnosed with the flexor tendonitis in his right foreleg. This injury effectively ended his career in racing. He would be retired and assigned to be a stud.

== Racing form ==
Toho Jackal won three races and placed in another two out of 13 starts. This data is available based on JBIS and netkeiba.

Date	Track	Race	Grade	Distance (Condition)	Entry	HN	Odds (Favored)	Finish	Time	Margins	Jockey	Winner (Runner-up)
2014 – three-year-old season
May 31	Kyoto	3yo Newcomer		1,800 m (Firm)	18	14	32.9 (10)	10th	1:50.5	1.0	Manabu Sakai	Sanrei Rocky
Jun 22	Hanshin	3yo Maiden		1,800 m (Good)	16	7	9.0 (5)	9th	1:56.4	2.7	Hideaki Miyuki	Kern Winner
Jul 12	Chukyo	3yo Maiden		1,600 m (Firm)	16	12	44.3 (8)	1st	1:36.8	0.0	Manabu Sakai	(Flash Bio)
Aug 3	Kokura	3yo Allowance	1W	1,800 m (Soft)	16	1	13.2 (6)	1st	1:48.3	–0.2	Manabu Sakai	(La Bravade)
Sep 6	Kokura	Genkai Tokubetsu	ALW (2W)	2,000 m (Firm)	13	13	6.6 (3)	2nd	1:59.1	0.0	Manabu Sakai	A Shin Max
Sep 28	Hanshin	Kobe Shimbun Hai	2	2,400 m (Firm)	16	2	63.6 (9)	3rd	2:24.4	0.0	Manabu Sakai	One and Only
Oct 26	Kyoto	Kikuka Sho	1	3,000 m (Firm)	18	2	6.9 (3)	1st	R3:01.0	–0.1	Manabu Sakai	(Sounds of Earth)
2015 – four-year-old season
Jun 28	Hanshin	Takarazuka Kinen	1	2,200 m (Firm)	16	14	17.7 (7)	4th	2:14.7	0.3	Manabu Sakai	Lovely Day
Aug 23	Sapporo	Sapporo Kinen	2	2,000 m (Firm)	15	12	2.9 (1)	8th	1:59.5	0.5	Manabu Sakai	Decipher
2016 – five-year-old season
Mar 20	Hanshin	Hanshin Daishoten	2	3,000 m (Firm)	11	3	3.5 (2)	7th	3:07.8	2.0	Mirco Demuro	Cheval Grand
May 1	Kyoto	Tenno Sho (Spring)	1	3,200 m (Firm)	18	9	17.4 (7)	5th	3:15.6	0.3	Manabu Sakai	Kitasan Black
Jun 26	Hanshin	Takarazuka Kinen	1	2,200 m (Good)	17	11	17.7 (6)	15th	2:14.9	2.1	Manabu Sakai	Marialite
Dec 3	Chukyo	Kinko Sho	2	2,000 m (Firm)	13	9	10.1 (5)	11th	2:00.4	0.7	Manabu Sakai	Yamakatsu Ace

Legend:
Turf Dirt

- R indicated that it was a record time finish

== Stud career ==
Toho Jackal entered his stud duty in 2017 at Arrow Stud in Shinhidaka, Hokkaido. In 2022, he migrated to Crux Stable, located in Niikappu, Hokkaido. He had bred with 55 mares and produced 30 foals with average earnings index of 1.17 that gained 337,985,500 ¥ in winning prizes.

== Pedigree ==
Pedigree of Toho Jackal (JPN), chestnut colt 2011
Sire Special Week (JPN) 1995	Sunday Silence (USA); 1986	Halo	Hail to Reason
Sire Special Week (JPN) 1995	Sunday Silence (USA); 1986	Halo	Cosmah
Sire Special Week (JPN) 1995	Sunday Silence (USA); 1986	Wishing Well	Understanding
Sire Special Week (JPN) 1995	Sunday Silence (USA); 1986	Wishing Well	Mountain Flower
Sire Special Week (JPN) 1995	Campaign Girl (JPN); 1987	Maruzensky	Nijinsky
Sire Special Week (JPN) 1995	Campaign Girl (JPN); 1987	Maruzensky	Shill
Sire Special Week (JPN) 1995	Campaign Girl (JPN); 1987	Lady Shiraoki	Saint Crespin
Sire Special Week (JPN) 1995	Campaign Girl (JPN); 1987	Lady Shiraoki	Miss Ashiyagawa
Dam Toho Gaia (USA) 2001	Unbridled's Song (USA); 1993	Unbridled	Fappiano
Dam Toho Gaia (USA) 2001	Unbridled's Song (USA); 1993	Unbridled	Gana Facil
Dam Toho Gaia (USA) 2001	Unbridled's Song (USA); 1993	Trolley Song	Caro
Dam Toho Gaia (USA) 2001	Unbridled's Song (USA); 1993	Trolley Song	Lucky Spell
Dam Toho Gaia (USA) 2001	Agami (USA); 1995	Nureyev	Northern Dancer
Dam Toho Gaia (USA) 2001	Agami (USA); 1995	Nureyev	Special
Dam Toho Gaia (USA) 2001	Agami (USA); 1995	Agacerie	Exclusive Native
Dam Toho Gaia (USA) 2001	Agami (USA); 1995	Agacerie	Quiet Charm (Family: 16-a)

- Toho Jackal is an inbred by 4 x 5 to Northern Dancer (Nijinsky's sire) and 5 x 5 to Nearctic (Northern Dancer's and Quiet Charm's sire).
