= 2023 World's Best Racehorse Rankings =

The 2023 World's Best Racehorse Rankings, sponsored by Longines was the 2023 edition of the World's Best Racehorse Rankings. It was an assessment of Thoroughbred racehorses issued by the International Federation of Horseracing Authorities (IFHA) on 23 January 2024. It included horses aged three or older which competed in flat races during 2023. It was open to all horses irrespective of where they raced or where they were trained.

== Rankings for 2023 ==
- For a detailed guide to this table, see below.

Rank	Rating	Horse	Age	Sex	Trained	Surface	Cat.
1	135	Equinox (JPN)	4	C	JPN	Turf	L
2	128	Ace Impact (IRE)	3	C	FR	Turf	L
2	128	Mostahdaf (IRE)	5	H	GB	Turf	I
4	127	Big Rock (FR)	3	C	FR	Turf	M
4	127	Hukum (IRE)	6	H	GB	Turf	L
6	126	Golden Sixty (AUS)	8	G	HK	Turf	M
6	126	Westover (GB)	4	C	GB	Turf	L
8	125	Auguste Rodin (IRE)	3	C	IRE	Turf	L
8	125	Lucky Sweynesse (NZ)	5	G	HK	Turf	S
10	124	Cody's Wish (USA)	5	H	USA	Dirt	M
10	124	Do Deuce (JPN)	4	C	JPN	Turf	L
10	124	Paddington (GB)	3	C	IRE	Turf	I
10	124	Titleholder (JPN)	5	H	JPN	Turf	L
10	124	White Abarrio (USA)	4	C	USA	Dirt	M
15	123	California Spangle (IRE)	5	G	HK	Turf	M
15	123	Luxembourg (IRE)	4	C	IRE	Turf	I
15	123	Onesto (IRE)	4	C	FR	Turf	L
15	123	Romantic Warrior (IRE)	5	G	HK	Turf	M, I
19	122	Elite Power (USA)	5	H	USA	Dirt	S
19	122	King of Steel (USA)	3	C	GB	Turf	I
19	122	Think About It (AUS)	5	G	AUS	Turf	S
19	122	Up To The Mark (USA)	4	C	USA	Turf	L
19	122	Ushba Tesoro (JPN)	6	H	JPN	Dirt	L
24	121	Arcangelo (USA)	3	C	USA	Dirt	I
24	121	Art Collector (USA)	6	H	USA	Dirt	M
24	121	Bay Bridge (GB)	5	H	GB	Turf	I
24	121	Dubai Honour (IRE)	5	G	GB	Turf	I
24	121	Emily Upjohn (GB)	4	F	GB	Turf	L
24	121	I Wish I Win (NZ)	5	G	AUS	Turf	S
24	121	Justin Palace (JPN)	4	C	JPN	Turf	I, L
24	121	Liberty Island (JPN)	3	F	JPN	Turf	L
24	121	Master of The Seas (IRE)	5	G	GB	Turf	M
24	121	National Treasure (USA)	3	C	USA	Dirt	M
24	121	Shahryar (JPN)	5	H	JPN	Turf	L
24	121	Triple Time (IRE)	4	C	GB	Turf	M
24	121	Without A Fight (IRE)	6	G	AUS	Turf	E
37	120	Anamoe (AUS)	5	H	AUS	Turf	M
37	120	Continuous (JPN)	3	C	IRE	Turf	L
37	120	Derma Sotogake (JPN)	3	C	JPN	Dirt	I
37	120	Durezza (JPN)	3	C	JPN	Turf	E
37	120	Giga Kick (AUS)	4	G	AUS	Turf	M
37	120	Gold Trip (FR)	6	H	AUS	Turf	I, L
37	120	Inspiral (GB)	4	F	GB	Turf	M
37	120	Iresine (FR)	6	G	GB	Turf	I
37	120	Lemon Pop (USA)	5	H	JPN	Dirt	I
37	120	Lord North (IRE)	7	G	GB	Turf	M
37	120	Mr Brightside (NZ)	6	G	AUS	Turf	M, I
37	120	Nashwa (GB)	4	F	GB	Turf	M, I
37	120	Nations Pride (IRE)	4	C	GB	Turf	I
37	120	Panthalassa (JPN)	6	H	JPN	Dirt	M
37	120	Private Eye (AUS)	6	G	AUS	Turf	S
37	120	Shaquille (GB)	3	C	GB	Turf	S

== Guide ==
A complete guide to the main table above.

Rank
A horse's position in the list, with the most highly rated at number 1. Each horse is ranked once according to its highest rating. Any lesser ratings for the same horse are not ranked.

Rating
A rating represents a weight value in pounds, with higher values given to horses which showed greater ability. It is judged that these weights would equalise the abilities of the horses if carried in a theoretical handicap race. The minimum rating required for inclusion is 115.

Horse
Each horse's name is followed by a suffix (from the IFHA's International Code of Suffixes) which indicates the country foaled.

Age
The age of the horse at the time it achieved its rating. The racing ages of all horses foaled in a particular part of the world increase simultaneously, regardless of the actual date of foaling.
Dates of age increase by location foaled
Northern Hemisphere	1 January
South America	1 July
Australia, New Zealand and South Africa	1 August

Sex
C	Colt	Ungelded male horse up to four-years-old
F	Filly	Female horse up to four-years-old
H	Horse	Ungelded male horse over four-years-old
M	Mare	Female horse over four-years-old
G	Gelding	Gelded male horse of any age

Trained
The country where the horse was trained at the time of the rating, abbreviated using the International Code of Suffixes.

Position
The horse's finishing position in the race shown. The actual finishing order can sometimes be amended following an inquiry or a disqualification.
=	Dead-heat
↑	Promoted from original finishing position
↓	Relegated from original finishing position

Race
The race (or one of the races) for which the horse achieved its rating. A defeated horse can be rated above its higher-placed opponents if it carried more weight.

Surface
The surface of the track on which the race was run, eg. turf or dirt. Synthetic surfaces are described as "artificial".

Distance
The distance of the race in metres. In some countries (eg. Canada, Great Britain, Ireland and the United States), the length of a race is usually expressed in miles and furlongs. These units have been converted to metres to allow for universal comparison.
Common conversions
5 furlongs	= 1,006 m	1 mile and 1½ furlongs	= 1,911 m
6 furlongs	= 1,207 m	1 mile and 2 furlongs	= 2,012 m
6½ furlongs	= 1,308 m	1 mile and 2½ furlongs	= 2,112 m
7 furlongs	= 1,408 m	1 mile and 3 furlongs	= 2,213 m
7½ furlongs	= 1,509 m	1 mile and 4 furlongs	= 2,414 m
1 mile	= 1,609 m	1 mile and 6 furlongs	= 2,816 m
1 mile and ½ furlong	= 1,710 m	2 miles	= 3,219 m
1 mile and 1 furlong	= 1,811 m	2 miles and 4 furlongs	= 4,023 m

Category
		Metres	Furlongs
S	Sprint	1,000–1,300; 1,000–1,599 (CAN / USA)	5–6.5; 5–7.99 (CAN / USA)
M	Mile	1,301–1,899; 1,600–1,899 (CAN / USA)	6.51–9.49; 8–9.49 (CAN / USA)
I	Intermediate	1,900–2,100	9.5–10.5
L	Long	2,101–2,700	10.51–13.5
E	Extended	2,701+	13.51+

International Code of Suffixes
The following countries have been represented in the WTR as foaling or training locations since the first edition in 2004.
ARG	Argentina	ITY	Italy
AUS	Australia	JPN	Japan
BRZ	Brazil	KSA	Saudi Arabia
CAN	Canada	NZ	New Zealand
CHI	Chile	SAF	South Africa
CZE	Czech Republic	SIN	Singapore
FR	France	SPA	Spain
GB	Great Britain	TUR	Turkey
GER	Germany	UAE	United Arab Emirates
HK	Hong Kong	USA	United States
HUN	Hungary	VEN	Venezuela
IRE	Ireland	ZIM	Zimbabwe

Shading
The shaded areas represent lesser ratings recorded by horses which were more highly rated in a different category. The IFHA publishes this information when the lower rating is the overall top performance in a particular category.
