= St Lite Kinen =

Japanese horse race

St Lite Kinen セントライト記念
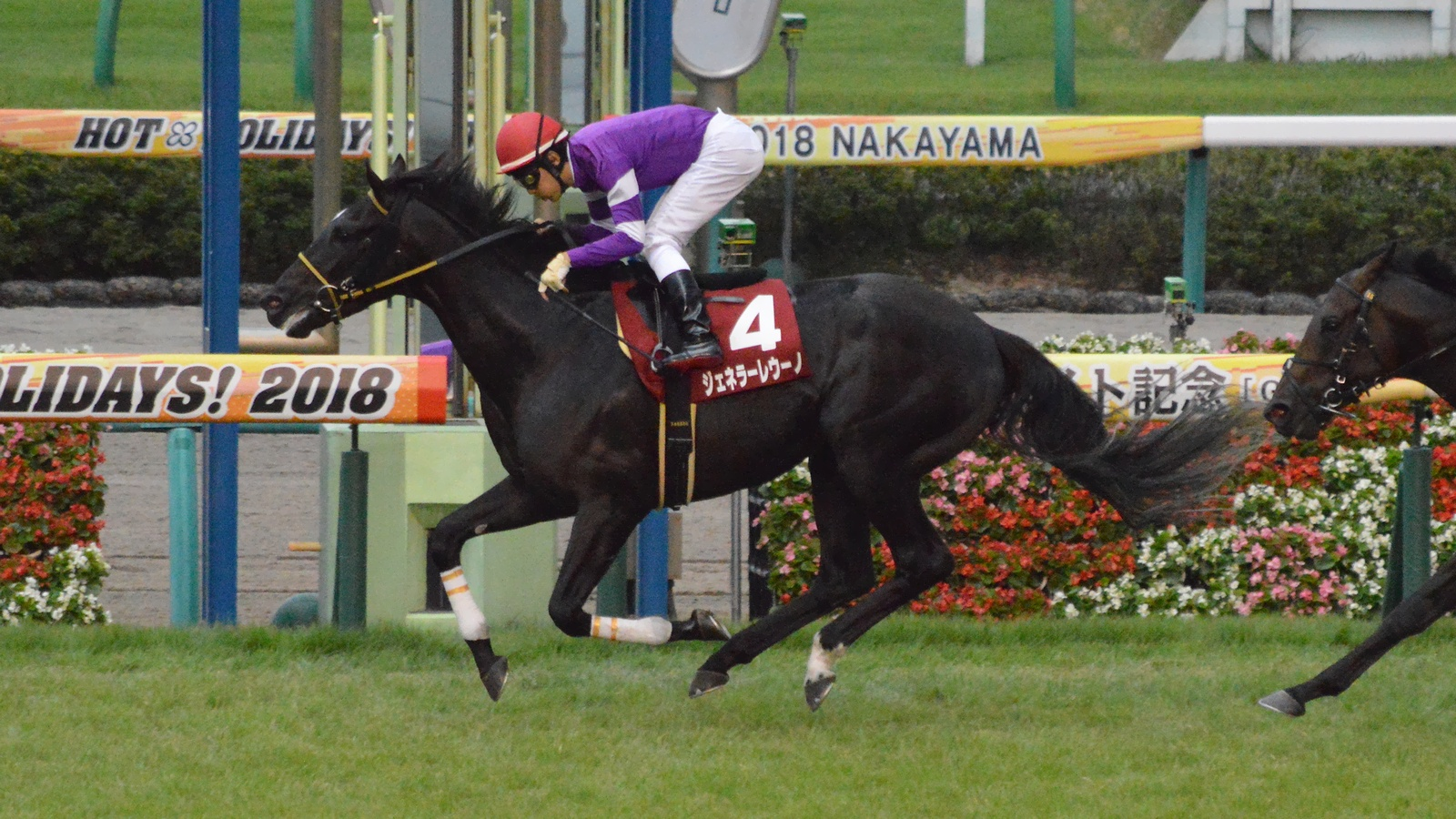
- 2018 St Lite Kinen winner Generale Uno
- Class: Grade 2
- Location: Nakayama Racecourse, Funabashi, Chiba.
- Inaugurated: 1947
- Race type: Thoroughbred Flat racing

Race information
- Distance: 2200 metres
- Surface: Turf
- Track: Right-handed
- Qualification: 3-y-o Colts & Fillies
- Weight: 57 kg Allowance: Fillies & mares 2 kg
- Purse: ¥ 117,540,000 (as of 2025): 1st: ¥ 54,000,000; 2nd: ¥ 22,000,000; 3rd: ¥ 14,000,000

The St Lite Kinen (セントライト記念, sentoraito kinen) is a Grade 2 flat horse race in Japan for three-year-old Thoroughbred colts and fillies run over a distance of 2,200 metres at the Nakayama Racecourse, Funabashi, Chiba. The race is run in September and serves as the main trial race for the Kikuka Sho (run in October).

It was first run in 1947 and was named in honour of the Japanese Triple Crown winner St Lite. Among the winners of the race have been Symboli Rudolf, Legacy World and Nakayama Festa.

The race was run at Tokyo Racecourse from 1947 until 1956 and in 1966, 1968, 1974, and 1976–1979. The 2014 running took place at Niigata Racecourse.

== Winners since 1995 ==
Year	Winner	Jockey	Trainer	Owner	Time
1995	Sunday Well	Eiji Nakadate	Hideyuki Mori	Yoshitaka Suzuki	2:13.6
1996	Rosen Kavalier	Shibata Yoshitomi	Yasuhiro Suzuki	Shadai Race Horse	2:20.1
1997	Shako Tesco	Seiji Ebisawa	Yuji Nodai	Shako	2:16.9
1998	Leo Ryuho	Teruo Eda	Sugiura Hiroaki	Leo	2:17.9
1999	Black Tuxedo	Hitoshi Matoba	Mitsuru Hashida	Makoto Kaneko	2:13.7
2000	Admire Boss	Hiroki Goto	Mitsuru Hashida	Riichi Kondo	2:16.9
2001	Shinko Calido	Tanaka Katsuhara	Munakata Yoshitada	Masatake Iida	2:13.1
2002	Balance of Game	Tanaka Katsuhara	Munakata Yoshitada	Hiroyuki Sonobe	2:12.9
2003	Vita Rosa	Yuichi Shibayama	Noboyuki Hori	Sunday Racing	2:24.5
2004	Cosmo Bulk	Furuka Igarashi	Kazunori Tabe	Misako Okada	2:10.1
2005	Kings Trail	Hiroshi Kitamura	Kazuo Fujisawa	Sunday Racing	2:11.8
2006	Tosen Shana O	Leith Innes	Hideyuki Mori	Takaya Shimada	2:13.1
2007	Roc de Cambes	Yuichi Shibayama	Noriyuki Hori	Kazumi Yoshida	2:12.0
2008	Daiwa Wild Boar	Hiroshi Kitamura	Hiroyuki Uehara	Keizo Yoshida	2:14.6
2009	Nakayama Festa	Masayoshi Ebina	Yoshitaka Ninomiya	Nobuko Izumi	2:12.0
2010	Quark Star	Yusuke Fujioka	Nobuyuki Hori	Shadai Race Horse	2:10.9
2011	Fateful War	Katsuharu Tanaka	Shinichi Ito	Shadai Race Horse	2:10.3
2012	Fenomeno	Masayoshi Ebina	Hirofumi Toda	Sunday Racing	2:10.8
2013	Yule Singing	Hiroshi Kitamura	Kazuhiro Seishi	Shadai Race Horse	2:13.5
2014	Isla Bonita	Masayoshi Ebina	Hironori Kurita	Shadai Race Horse	2:11.7
2015	Kitasan Black	Hiroshi Kitamura	Hisashi Shimizu	Ōno Shōji	2:13.8
2016	Dee Majesty	Masayoshi Ebina	Yoshitaka Ninomiya	Masaru Shimada	2:13.1
2017	Mikki Swallow	Norihiro Yokoyama	Takanori Kikuzawa	Mizuki Noda	2:12.7
2018	Generale Uno	Hironobu Tanabe	Eiichi Yano	G Riviere Racing	2:12.1
2019	Lion Lion	Norihiro Yokoyama	Mikio Matsunaga	Chiyono Terada	2:11.5
2020	Babbitt	Hiroyuki Uchida	Tamio Hamada	Naoya Miyata	2:15.0
2021	Asamano Itazura	Hironobu Tanabe	Takahisa Tezuka	Juichi Hoshino	2:12.3
2022	Gaia Force	Kohei Matsuyama	Haruki Sugiyama	KR Japan	2:11.8
2023	Lebensstil	João Moreira	Hiroyasu Tanaka	Carrot Farm	2:11.4
2024	Urban Chic	Christophe Lemaire	Ryo Takei	Silk Racing Co. Ltd.	2:11.6
2025	Museum Mile	Keita Tosaki	Daisuke Takayanagi	Sunday Racing	2:10.8
2026	Justin Chicago	Yusuke Hara	Keisuke Miyata	Masahiro Miki	2:14.0

== Earlier winners ==
- 1947 - East Parade
- 1948 - Kiyomasu
- 1949 - Tosa Midori
- 1950 - Wizard
- 1951 - Mitsuhata
- 1952 - Masamune
- 1953 - Lucky Takayohi
- 1954 - Homare O
- 1955 - Takahagi
- 1956 - Kitano O
- 1957 - Seiyu
- 1958 - Hishi Masaru
- 1959 - Haku Kurama
- 1960 - Kitano Oza
- 1961 - Kenruko O
- 1962 - Ryu Musashi
- 1963 - Great Yoruka
- 1964 - Umeno Chikara
- 1965 - Kikuna Suzuran
- 1966 - Hiro Isami
- 1967 - Monta Son
- 1968 - Asaka O
- 1969 - Akane Tenryu
- 1970 - Kurishiba
- 1971 - Bel Wide
- 1972 - Taiho Ciro
- 1973 - Nuage Turf
- 1974 - Suruga Sumpujo
- 1975 - Ishino Arashi
- 1976 - Nippo King
- 1977 - Press Toko
- 1978 - Sakura Shori
- 1979 - Bingo Karoo
- 1980 - Monte Prince
- 1981 - Mejiro Titan
- 1982 - Hospitality
- 1983 - Mejiro Heine
- 1984 - Symboli Rudolf
- 1985 - Tiger Boy
- 1986 - Legend Teio
- 1987 - Merry Nice
- 1988 - Daigo Sur
- 1989 - Sakura Hokuto O
- 1990 - White Stone
- 1991 - Strong Kaiser
- 1992 - Legacy World
- 1993 - Rugger Champion
- 1994 - Wind Fields

== See also ==
- Horse racing in Japan
- List of Japanese flat horse races
