= Principal Stakes =

Japanese thoroughbred race

Principal Stakes プリンシパルステークス
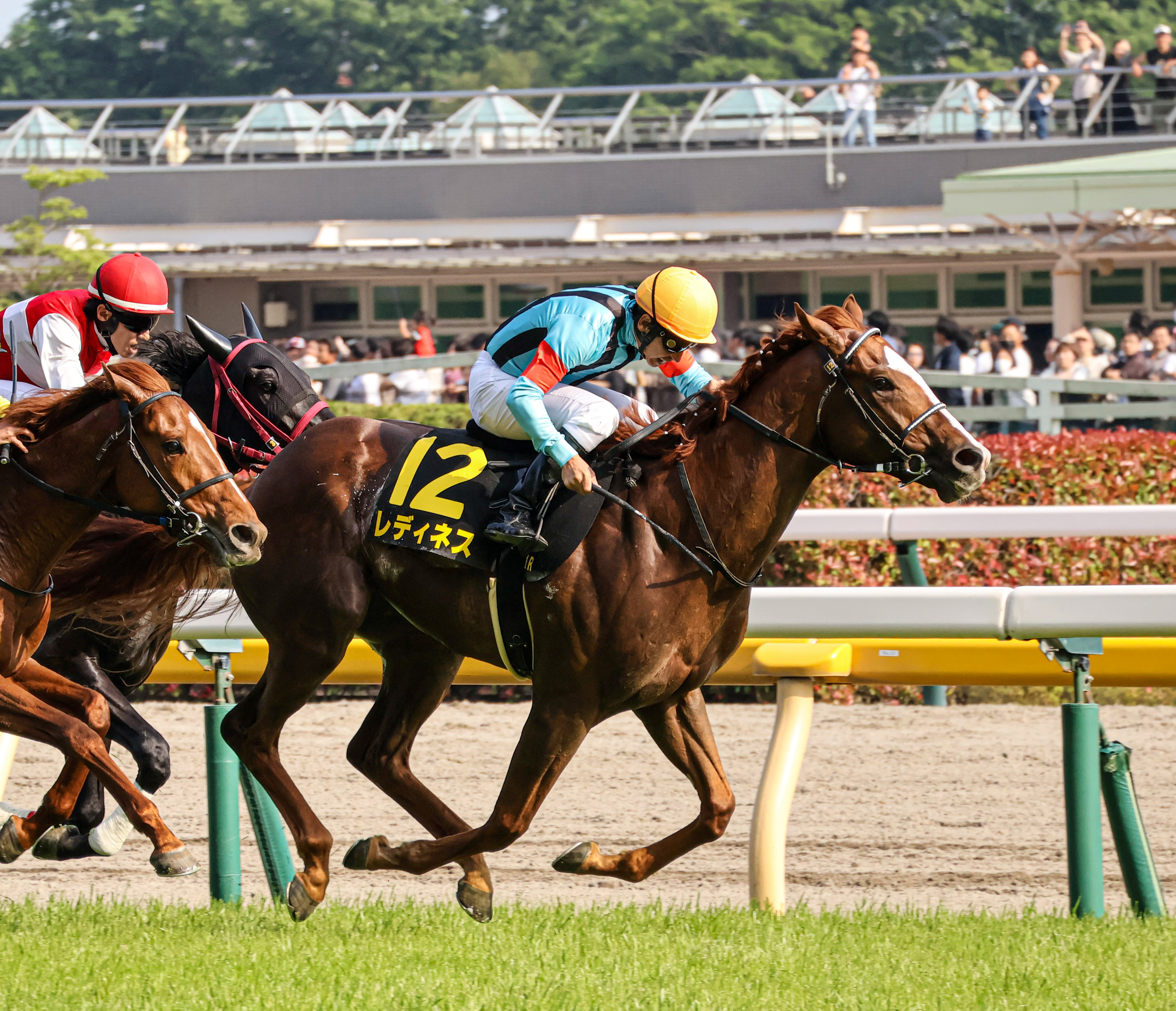
- 2025 Principal Stakes winner Readiness
- Class: Listed
- Location: Tokyo
- Inaugurated: 1996
- Race type: Thoroughbred - Flat racing

Race information
- Distance: 2,000 meters
- Surface: Turf
- Track: Tokyo Racecourse
- Qualification: Three-year-old Fillies and Colts
- Weight: 57 kg Allowance: Fillies 2 kg
- Purse: ¥ 43,200,000 (as of 2024): 1st: ¥ 20,000,000; 2nd: ¥ 8,000,000; 3rd: ¥ 5,000,000

The Principal Stakes (in Japanese: プリンシパルステークス) is a listed race for three-year-old stallions and mares in the Japan Racing Association.

== Race details ==
The race was established in 1996 as a qualifying race for the Tokyo Yūshun, which is run in late May or early June. The winner of this race will be given Priority entry rights to the Japanese Derby. To those who wish to qualify for Tokyo Yūshun, winning this race is normally the final chance.

It is an international race, typically held in May.

== Past winners ==
| Year | Winner | Jockey | Trainer | Owner | Time |
|---|---|---|---|---|---|
| 1996 | Dance in the Dark | Yutaka Take | Kojiro Hashiguchi | Shadai Race Horse | 2:13.9 |
| 1997 | Silence Suzuka | Hiroyuki Uemura | Mitsuru Hashida | Keiji Nagai | 2:13.4 |
| 1998 | Taiki Bridle | Yukio Okabe | Masanori Ito | Taiki Farm | 2:13.8 |
| 1999 | Black Tuxedo | Hitoshi Matoba | Mitsuhiro Ogata | Makoto Kaneko | 2:13.6 |
| 2000 | Toho Shiden | Masayoshi Ebina | Kiyotaka Tanaka | Toho Bussan | 2:13.9 |
| 2001 | Miscast | Norihiro Yokoyama | Keiji Kato | North Hills Management | 2:12.9 |
| 2002 | Mega Stardom | Mikio Matsunaga | Shoji Yamamoto | North Hills Management | 2:14.6 |
| 2003 | Meiner Solomon | Hiroki Goto | Sakae Kunieda | Thoroughbred Club Ruffian | 2:01.2 |
| 2004 | Pisa no Kukai | Damien Oliver | Kazuo Fujisawa | Yoshimi Ichikawa | 2:00.2 |
| 2005 | Eishin Niizan | Masayoshi Ebina | Masanori Sakaguchi | Toyomitsu Hirai | 2:01.2 |
| 2006 | Victory Run | Masayoshi Ebina | Kiyohiro Tadokoro | Toshiharu Yamamoto | 2:00.2 |
| 2007 | Golden Dahlia | Yoshitomi Shibata | Yoshitaka Ninomiya | Yoshiko Tanaka | 1:59.6 |
| 2008 | Venture Nine | Tomoharu Bushizawa | Satoru Kobiyama | Yoshiro Motosugi | 2:01.5 |
| 2009 | Keiai Raijin | Yoshitomi Shibata | Mitsuhiro Ogata | Keiai Orthopedic Appliances | 1:59.9 |
| 2010 | Rulership | Norihiro Yokoyama | Katsuhiko Sumii | Sunday Racing | 1:59.1 |
| 2011 | Tosen Reve | Craig Williams | Yasutoshi Ikee | Takaya Shimakawa | 2:01.0 |
| 2012 | Spielberg | Hiroyuki Uchida | Kazuo Fujisawa | Hidetoshi Yamamoto | 2:00.9 |
| 2013 | Samson's Pride | Hironobu Tanabe | Hiroaki Sugiura | Silk | 2:01.4 |
| 2014 | Bell Canyon | Keita Tosaki | Noriyuki Hori | Kaneko Makoto Holdings | 2:01.0 |
| 2015 | Ambitious | Christophe Lemaire | Hidetaka Otonashi | Hideko Kondo | 2:00.2 |
| 2016 | Azure Rose | Hugh Bowman | Masaaki Koga | Carrot Farm | 1:59.2 |
| 2017 | Daiwa Cagney | Hiroshi Kitamura | Takanori Kikuzawa | Keizo Oshiro | 1:58.3 |
| 2018 | Cosmic Force | Christophe Lemaire | Sakae Kunieda | Sunday Racing | 1:58.2 |
| 2019 | Zadar | Shuu Ishibashi | Masahiro Ootake | Carrot Farm | 1:58.3 |
| 2020 | Bitterender | Akihide Tsumura | Ikuo Aizawa | Hidaka Breeders Union | 1:59.8 |
| 2021 | Baji O | Akihide Tsumura | Hiroyasu Tanaka | Takeshi Suzuki | 1:59.3 |
| 2022 | Seiun Hades | Hideaki Miyuki | Shinsuke Hashiguchi | Shigeyuki Nishiyama | 1:59.0 |
| 2023 | Pax Ottomanica | Hironobu Tanabe | Takashi Kubota | Yoshiro Kubota | 2:01.0 |
| 2024 | Danon Ayers Rock | João Moreira | Noriyuki Hori | Danobx | 1:59.6 |
| 2025 | Readiness | Norihiro Yokoyama | Mitsugu Kon | Koji Yasuhara | 1:59.3 |
| 2026 | Meisho Hachiko | Michael Dee | Mitsunori Makiura | Yoshitaka Matsumoto | 1:58.5 |

== See also ==
- Horse racing in Japan
- List of Japanese flat horse races
