= Shonan Adela =

Japanese thoroughbred race horse and broodmare

Shonan Adela; ショウナンアデラ
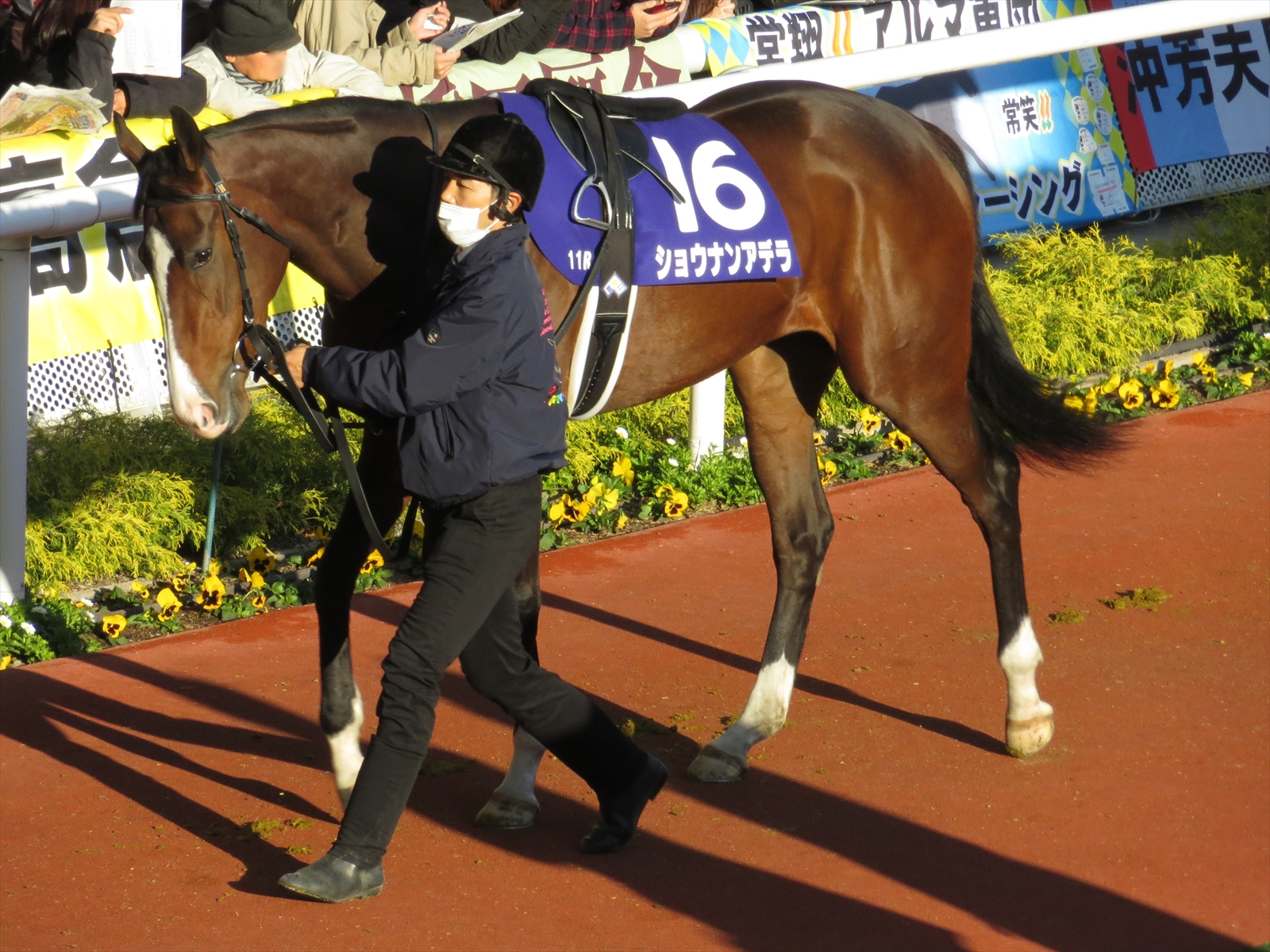
- Shonan Adela in 2014
- Sire: Deep Impact
- Grandsire: Sunday Silence
- Dam: Always Willing
- Damsire: Elusive Quality
- Sex: Mare
- Foaled: 10 February 2012
- Country: Japan
- Colour: Bay
- Breeder: Shimokobe Farm
- Owner: Tetsuhide Kunimoto
- Racing colours
- Trainer: Yoshitaka Ninomiya
- Jockey: Masayoshi Ebina
- Record: 7: 3-1-0
- Earnings: JPY84,175,000

Major wins
- Hanshin Juvenile Fillies (2014)

Awards
- JRA Award for Best Two-Year-Old Filly (2014)

Shonan Adela (Japanese: ショウナンアデラ, foaled 10 February 2012) is a Japanese Thoroughbred racehorse and broodmare. She was the best two-year-old filly in Japan in 2014 when she won her last three races including the Hanshin Juvenile Fillies and was the unanimous choice for the JRA Award for Best Two-Year-Old Filly. Her later career was badly disrupted by injury and she made only three disappointing appearances over the next three seasons.

== Background ==
Shonan Adela is a bay mare with a white blaze and four white socks bred in Hokkaido, Japan by the Shimokobe Farm. During her racing career she was owned by Tetsuhide Kunimoto and trained by Yoshitaka Ninomiya.

She was from the fifth crop of foals sired by Deep Impact, who was the Japanese Horse of the Year in 2005 and 2006, winning races including the Tokyo Yushun, Tenno Sho, Arima Kinen and Japan Cup. Deep Impact's other progeny include Gentildonna, Harp Star, Kizuna, A Shin Hikari, Marialite and Saxon Warrior. Shonan Adela's dam Always Willing was bred in Kentucky and won minor race in the United States before being bought for $310,000 by Shimokobe Farm in November 2009 and exported to Japan in the following year. Always Willing's dam Always Loyal won the Poule d'Essai des Pouliches and was a half-sister to Anabaa.

== Racing career ==
=== 2014: two-year-old season ===
Shonan Adela began her racing career by finishing a close second to the colt Navion in a 1600-metre event at Niigata Racecourse on 3 August. After a two-month break she returned for a maiden race over the same distance at Tokyo Racecourse and recorded her first success as she won from Meisho Sawayaka and sixteen others. The filly followed up in the Karamatsu Sho over 1400 metres at the same track, winning by half a length from the colt Daitokyo.

At Hanshin Racecourse on 14 December Shonan Adela was stepped up to Grade 1 class for the Hanshin Juvenile Fillies, Japan's most prestigious race for two-year-old females, and started at odds of 8.8/1. Roca was made favourite ahead of Let's Go Donki, Caught Charmant (Rindo Sho) and Kokorono Ai (Artemis Stakes) in an eighteen-runner field. Ridden by Masayoshi Ebina Shonan Adela started slowly and raced towards the rear of the field before making a forward move on the final turn. She was switched to the outside in the straight and produced a strong late run to catch Let's Go Donki in the final strides and win by half a length. Ebina commented "She didn't break well, but I decided to keep cool and take this opportunity to race her from a little further back than usual. Just as I had anticipated, she had a great late speed and although she was a bit green when crowded by other fillies, we were able to come out following the runner-up for a clear run. I knew that she could make it once we hit the gas".

In January 2015 Shonan Adela was named Best Two-Year-Old Filly at the JRA Awards for 2014, being the unanimous choice of the 285 voters.

=== Later career ===
After being kept off the track by injury for the spring and summer of 2015, Shonan Adela was expected to begin her second season in the Rose Stakes in September but sustained a leg fracture in training and missed the rest of the season.

Shonan Adela belatedly returned for the Victoria Mile in 2016 at Tokyo on 15 May. Running for the first time in seventeen months, she started a 34/1 outsider and came home sixteenth of the eighteen runners, seventeen lengths behind the winner Straight Girl. On her only other start of the year she finished sixth behind Win Full Bloom in a Listed race at Fukushima Racecourse on 24 July. The mare returned for one final run in April 2017 when she finished last of the sixteen runners behind Logi Chalice in the Grade 3 Lord Derby Challenge Trophy at Nakayama Racecourse.

== Racing form ==
Below data is based on data available on JBIS Search and netkeiba.com.

Date	Track	Race	Grade	Distance (Condition)	Entry	HN	Odds (Favored)	Finish	Time	Margins	Jockey	Winner (Runner-up)
2014 – two-year-old season
Aug 3	Niigata	2yo Newcomer		1,600 m (Firm)	18	7	3.1 (1)	2nd	1:37.3	0.0	Masayoshi Ebina	Navion
Oct 12	Tokyo	2yo Maiden		1,600 m (Firm)	18	14	1.8 (1)	1st	1:36.0	–0.2	Masayoshi Ebina	(Meisho Sawayaka)
Nov 22	Tokyo	Karamatsu Sho	ALW (1W)	1,400 m (Firm)	12	8	2.3 (1)	1st	1:22.0	–0.1	Masayoshi Ebina	(Daitokyo)
Dec 14	Hanshin	Hanshin Juvenile Fillies	1	1,600 m (Firm)	18	16	9.8 (5)	1st	1:34.4	–0.1	Masayoshi Ebina	(Let's Go Donki)
2016 – four-year-old season
May 15	Tokyo	Victoria Mile	1	1,600 m (Firm)	18	18	35.4 (11)	16th	1:34.3	2.3	Masayoshi Ebina	Straight Girl
Jul 24	Fukushima	Fukushima TV Open	OP	1,800 m (Firm)	9	2	4.7 (3)	6th	1:48.3	1.0	Masayoshi Ebina	Win Full Bloom
2017 – five-year-old season
Apr 1	Nakayama	Lord Derby Challenge Trophy	3	1,600 m (Good)	16	4	39.0 (9)	16th	1:35.8	1.1	Masayoshi Ebina	Logi Chalice

Legend:
Turf

== Pedigree ==
Pedigree of Shonan Adela (JPN), bay mare 2012
Sire Deep Impact (JPN) 2002	Sunday Silence (USA); 1986	Halo	Hail to Reason
Sire Deep Impact (JPN) 2002	Sunday Silence (USA); 1986	Halo	Cosmah
Sire Deep Impact (JPN) 2002	Sunday Silence (USA); 1986	Wishing Well	Understanding
Sire Deep Impact (JPN) 2002	Sunday Silence (USA); 1986	Wishing Well	Mountain Flower
Sire Deep Impact (JPN) 2002	Wind in Her Hair (IRE); 1991	Alzao (USA)	Lyphard
Sire Deep Impact (JPN) 2002	Wind in Her Hair (IRE); 1991	Alzao (USA)	Lady Rebecca (GB)
Sire Deep Impact (JPN) 2002	Wind in Her Hair (IRE); 1991	Burghclere (GB)	Busted
Sire Deep Impact (JPN) 2002	Wind in Her Hair (IRE); 1991	Burghclere (GB)	Highclere
Dam Always Willing (USA) 2006	Elusive Quality; 1993	Gone West	Mr. Prospector
Dam Always Willing (USA) 2006	Elusive Quality; 1993	Gone West	Secrettame
Dam Always Willing (USA) 2006	Elusive Quality; 1993	Touch of Greatness	Hero's Honor
Dam Always Willing (USA) 2006	Elusive Quality; 1993	Touch of Greatness	Ivory Wand
Dam Always Willing (USA) 2006	Always Loyal; 1994	Zilzal	Nureyev
Dam Always Willing (USA) 2006	Always Loyal; 1994	Zilzal	French Charmer
Dam Always Willing (USA) 2006	Always Loyal; 1994	Balbonella	Gay Mecene
Dam Always Willing (USA) 2006	Always Loyal; 1994	Balbonella	Bamieres (Family: 1-n)
