= Spielberg (horse) =

Japanese thoroughbred racehorse

Spielberg; スピルバーグ
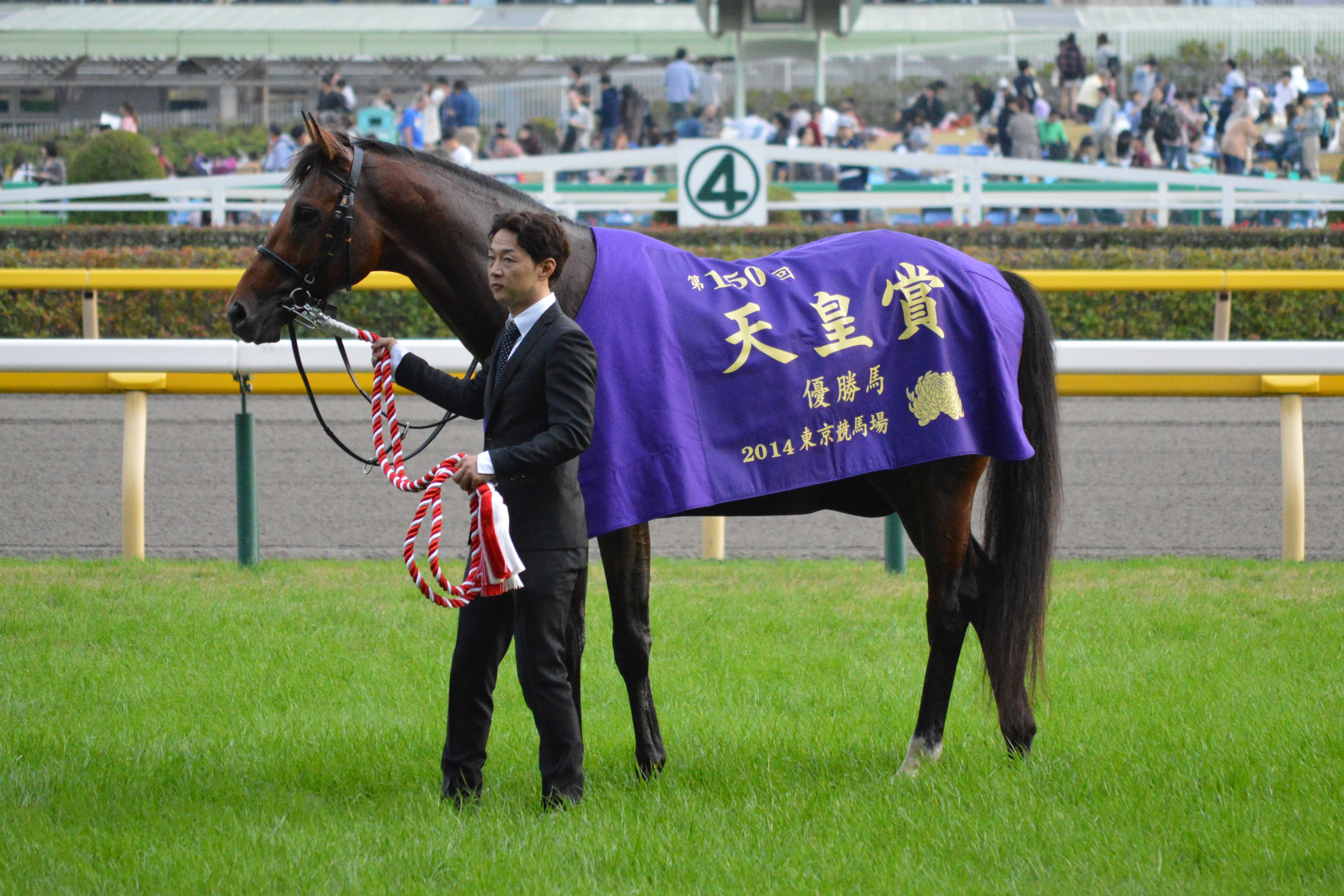
- Spielberg after winning the 2014 Tenno Sho (Autumn)
- Breed: Thoroughbred
- Sire: Deep Impact
- Grandsire: Sunday Silence
- Dam: Princess Olivia
- Damsire: Lycius
- Sex: Stallion
- Foaled: May 12, 2009 (age 17)
- Country: Japan
- Color: Bay
- Breeder: Shadai Farm
- Owner: Hidetoshi Yamamoto
- Racing colours
- Trainer: Kazuo Fujisawa
- Jockey: Hiroshi Kitamura
- Record: 18: 6-1-4
- Earnings: ¥329,201,000

Major wins
- Tennō Shō (Autumn) (2014)
- Last updated on October 2, 2026

Spielberg (Japanese: スピルバーグ, Hepburn: Supirubāgu; foaled May 12, 2009) is a retired Japanese Thoroughbred racehorse and an active sire. His major feat in racing was his win at the 2014 Tenno Sho (Autumn) as the fifth favourite for the race, upsetting the likes of Gentildonna, Epiphaneia and Isla Bonita.

== Background ==
Spielberg was foaled out of Princess Olivia, an imported mare from America who won three races out of 24 starts and sired by the eleven time leading sire in Japan, Deep Impact. He is a full blooded sibling to Tosen Ra, the 2013 Mile Championship winner.

He was named after a common surname – Spielberg.

== Racing career ==
=== 2011: two-year-old season ===
He made his debut on 15 October at the 2000 metre race held at the Tokyo Racecourse. He started from the back of the pack but moved up to fourth place during the race, and finally overtook the front-running Blind Side to win just by a neck. He was rested for the rest of the year.

=== 2012: three-year-old season ===
Spielberg second race would be held at the Tokyo, in which he fell short at the ending phase and finished in second two lengths behind Fenomeno. In February, he would run in his first graded stakes race, the Kyodo News Service Hai. He ran well into the final straight and finished in third behind Gold Ship and Deep Brillante on the line. One month later, he entered an allowance race in which his late surge only enough for a fourth place finish. At the end of March, he ran well in the Mainichi Hai as he moved outward in the final phase and came home third on the line. Two months later, he ran in the Principal Stakes, an open grade race. Hiroyuki Uchida, who was his jockey in that race, managed to recover from the slow start and keep on the inside track leading up to the final straight. Then, he moved outside for his finishing kick and pulled away to win by one and three quarters lengths over the second place finisher, Laurel Bullet. Since this was a trial for the Tokyo Yushun, he qualified as a winner to compete in that race. Unfortunately he did not featured well on the day as he stuck at the last place mostly before slightly improving at the final stint to finish in 14th, his first off-prize finish. There were plan to race him in the autumn leg but it did not happen and he was written off for the rest of the season.

=== 2013: four-year-old season ===
After a classic year with only two wins, he returned to the allowance races. He resumed his season with slow progress at the Hidaka Tokubetsu in August, where he fell two places from fourth position at the final straight to finish sixth at the line. His second race for the season would be the Kanagawa Shimbun Hai in October. His main jockey, Hiroshi Kitamura, rode him with a good rhythm and cued him successfully to accelerate in the final straight, and he won by two lengths. Spielberg's great form continued on in his final race of the season at the November Stakes, as he raced competitively and won the race by a neck. This win promoted him into the open class once again.

=== 2014: five-year-old season ===
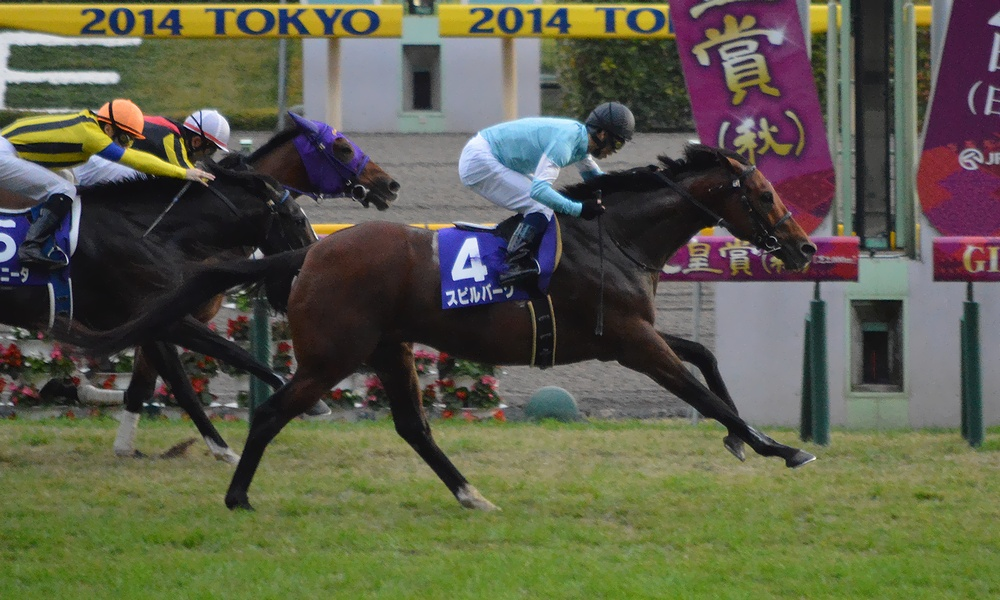
Spielberg (number 4) beat Gentildonna (white helmet) and Isla Bonita (orange helmet) to the line at 2014 Tenno Sho (Autumn)

This year, he started the season at the May Stakes in May. As the race began, he started to slow down as the race went but Kitamura, rallied him as they approached the fourth corner, moved out wide, overtook the rest of the pack and pulled away to win his third race in a row. He was scheduled to run in the Epsom Cup next, but he was diagnosed with a bruised bone at the last minute, which sidelined him over the summer. Spielberg only returned again in the autumn at the Mainichi Okan. Kitamura spoke about his three-win streak: "He's been getting stronger lately. He won two races last fall, then won again after a break, and now we've finally made it this far. He used to have a very weak constitution, and it was difficult to put him through training, so we had to try to correct his weaknesses while racing him. I think that's where he's getting stronger. I rode him in training in between, and he's become much tougher now (compared to when he first debuted). He's always been obedient and easy to ride, but I think his inner self has improved." On the race day, he had an intense fight against Air Saumur and Sanrei Laser in the final straight but lost out and ended up in third place. He entered the premier autumn G1, Tenno Sho (Autumn) with three wins and one third place in his last four starts, weighing 508 kilogram and drawn into gate 4 at the start. When the gates opened, Kitamura controlled Spielberg's pace at the back pack whilst Curren Black Hill dictated the pack from the front. Reaching the homestretch, Kitamura propelled the horse from the outside and swooped across Fenomeno, Isla Bonita and Gentildonna at the final furlong pole to win the race by three quarters of a length. Speaking about his first ever graded race and G1 win, Kitamura thought the horse was getting stronger as his career goes and trainer, Kazuo Fujisawa thought the horse stretched out well in the straight and praised his physical ability and energy. The horse would finish his season at the Japan Cup in the end of November. In the race, he struggled to get going from the outside track, but he got better as the race went on. Trading Leather who broke down near the end affected his rhythm but he recovered in the final straight and finished third on the day behind Epiphaneia and Just A Way.

=== 2015: six-year-old season ===
Spielberg at the 2015 Sankei Osaka Hai paddock

Spielberg was going on an overseas trip this season, but he would run in the preparation race at the Sankei Osaka Hai in April. Fujisawa said the horse completed his workout well and everything was going smoothly. In this race, he stayed at the back mostly and accelerated forward in the end phase. He finished in fourth place on the day. Right after this race, he, alongside stablemate Lelouch and Supermoon, travelled to England. Spielberg would be competing in the Prince of Wales's Stakes in June. In this race, he steadied in the midfield for the most part, started to get into pace two furlongs from the line, but was never able to improve his position as he finished sixth. Then, he returned to Japan and had two more starts at the Mainichi Okan and Tenno Sho Autumn, in which he tanked in both races and finished tenth. Due to this poor finish in his last two outings, Fujisawa decided to retire him from racing, as he thought his footwork was no longer the same as before. His racehorse registration was terminated on 8 November and he moved to stud at the Shadai Stallion Station in Abira, Hokkaido.

== Racing form ==
Spielberg won six races and scored five more podium places out of eighteen starts. This data is available based on JBIS, netkeiba, and the British Horseracing Authority.

Date	Track	Race	Grade	Distance (Condition)	Entry	HN	Odds (Favored)	Finish	Time	Margins	Jockey	Winner (Runner-up)
2011 – two-year-old season
Oct 15	Tokyo	2yo Debut		2,000 m (Good)	7	7	2.1 (1)	1st	2:08.2	0.0	Hiroshi Kitamura	(Blind Side)
2012 – three-year-old season
Jan 29	Tokyo	3yo Allowance	1W	2,000 m (Firm)	14	6	7.4 (4)	2nd	2:01.2	0.3	Hiroshi Kitamura	Fenomeno
Feb 12	Tokyo	Kyodo News Service Hai	GIII	1,800 m (Firm)	11	8	13.7 (3)	3rd	1:48.6	0.3	Hiroshi Kitamura	Gold Ship
Mar 11	Nakayama	3yo Allowance	1W	2,000 m (Soft)	11	6	1.7 (1)	4th	2:09.4	0.7	Hiroyuki Uchida	Meiner Karmin
Mar 24	Hanshin	Mainichi Hai	GIII	1,800 m (Soft)	13	4	14.4 (7)	3rd	1:49.8	0.2	Hirofumi Shii	Historical
May 5	Tokyo	Principal Stakes	OP	2,000 m (Firm)	17	8	1.7 (1)	1st	2:00.9	–0.3	Hiroyuki Uchida	Laurel Bullet
May 27	Tokyo	Tokyo Yushun	GI	2,400 m (Firm)	18	1	38.7 (9)	14th	2:25.4	1.6	Norihiro Yokoyama	Deep Brillante
2013 – four-year-old season
Aug 11	Hakodate	Hidaka Tokubetsu (ALW)	2W	2,000 m (Firm)	13	3	9.6 (4)	6th	2:03.2	0.7	Genki Maruyama	Decipher
Oct 13	Tokyo	Kanagawa Shimbun Hai (ALW)	2W	1,800 m (Firm)	11	3	2.8 (1)	1st	1:45.8	–0.3	Hiroshi Kitamura	(Festive Taro)
Nov 10	Tokyo	November Stakes (ALW)	3W	1,800 m (Firm)	15	6	1.4 (1)	1st	1:47.4	0.0	Hiroshi Kitamura	(Queen Olive)
2014 – five-year-old season
May 24	Tokyo	May Stakes	OP	1,800 m (Firm)	18	13	2.7 (1)	1st	1:45.4	–0.1	Hiroshi Kitamura	(Aroma Cafe)
Oct 12	Tokyo	Mainichi Okan	GII	1,800 m (Firm)	15	8	8.3 (5)	3rd	1:45.3	0.1	Hiroshi Kitamura	Air Saumur
Nov 2	Tokyo	Tenno Sho (Autumn)	GI	2,000 m (Firm)	18	4	11.0 (5)	1st	1:59.7	–0.1	Hiroshi Kitamura	(Gentildonna)
Nov 30	Tokyo	Japan Cup	GI	2,400 m (Firm)	18	15	11.3 (6)	3rd	2:23.9	0.8	Hiroshi Kitamura	Epiphaneia
2015 – six-year-old season
Apr 5	Hanshin	Sankei Osaka Hai	GII	2,000 m (Heavy)	14	12	7.4 (2)	4th	2:03.8	0.9	Hiroshi Kitamura	Lachesis
Jun 17	Ascot	Prince of Wales's Stakes	GI	10 f (Firm)	9	7	7/1 (3)	6th	2:05.73	0.66	Christophe Soumillon	Free Eagle
Oct 11	Tokyo	Mainichi Okan	GII	1,800 m (Firm)	13	12	8.6 (5)	10th	1:46.4	0.8	Hiroshi Kitamura	A Shin Hikari
Nov 1	Tokyo	Tenno Sho (Autumn)	GI	2,000 m (Firm)	18	17	23.1 (8)	10th	1:59.2	0.8	Hiroshi Kitamura	Lovely Day

Legend:
Turf

== Stud career ==
He stayed at Shadai Stallion Station from 2016 before moving on to Breeders Stallion Station in 2018, then to the East Stud in 2020. During his stud career, he bred with 294 mares, produced 197 foals, registered 191 of them with earnings of ¥1,403,028,500 and AEI of 0.67.

== Pedigree ==
Pedigree of Spielberg (JPN), 2009
Sire Deep Impact (JPN) 2002	Sunday Silence (USA); 1986	Halo	Hail to Reason
Sire Deep Impact (JPN) 2002	Sunday Silence (USA); 1986	Halo	Cosmah
Sire Deep Impact (JPN) 2002	Sunday Silence (USA); 1986	Wishing Well	Understanding
Sire Deep Impact (JPN) 2002	Sunday Silence (USA); 1986	Wishing Well	Mountain Flower
Sire Deep Impact (JPN) 2002	Wind in Her Hair (IRE); 1991	Alzao	Lyphard
Sire Deep Impact (JPN) 2002	Wind in Her Hair (IRE); 1991	Alzao	Lady Rebecca
Sire Deep Impact (JPN) 2002	Wind in Her Hair (IRE); 1991	Burghclere	Busted
Sire Deep Impact (JPN) 2002	Wind in Her Hair (IRE); 1991	Burghclere	Highclere
Dam Princess Olivia (USA) 1995 F. no: 17-b	Lycius (USA); 1988	Mr. Prospector	Raise a Native
Dam Princess Olivia (USA) 1995 F. no: 17-b	Lycius (USA); 1988	Mr. Prospector	Gold Digger
Dam Princess Olivia (USA) 1995 F. no: 17-b	Lycius (USA); 1988	Lypatia	Lyphard
Dam Princess Olivia (USA) 1995 F. no: 17-b	Lycius (USA); 1988	Lypatia	Hypatia
Dam Princess Olivia (USA) 1995 F. no: 17-b	Dance Image (IRE); 1990	Sadler's Wells	Northern Dancer
Dam Princess Olivia (USA) 1995 F. no: 17-b	Dance Image (IRE); 1990	Sadler's Wells	Fairy Bridge
Dam Princess Olivia (USA) 1995 F. no: 17-b	Dance Image (IRE); 1990	Diamond Spring	Vaguely Noble
Dam Princess Olivia (USA) 1995 F. no: 17-b	Dance Image (IRE); 1990	Diamond Spring	Dumfries

- Spielberg is an inbred of 4 x 4 to Lyphard, 4 x 5 x 5 to Northern Dancer (Lyphard's sire), and 5 x 5 x 5 to Goofed (Lyphard's and Dumfries's dam)
