= Fenomeno (horse) =

Japanese-bred Thoroughbred racehorse

Fenomeno フェノーメノ
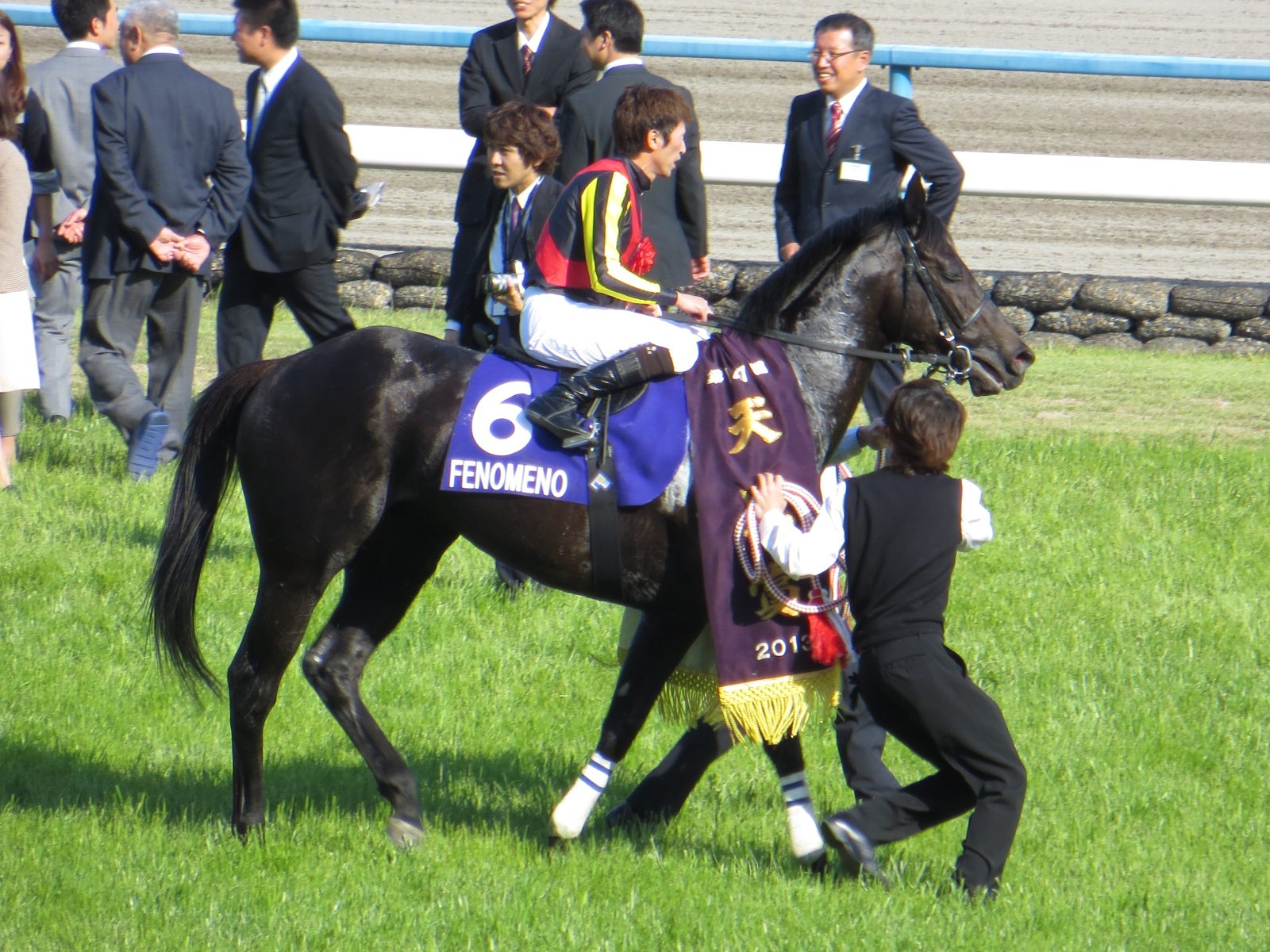
- Fenomeno in April 2013.
- Breed: Thoroughbred
- Sire: Stay Gold (JPN)
- Grandsire: Sunday Silence (USA)
- Dam: De Laroche (IRE)
- Damsire: Danehill (USA)
- Sex: Stallion
- Foaled: April 20, 2009 (age 17)
- Country: Japan
- Colour: Black Bay
- Breeder: Oiwake Farm
- Owner: Sunday Racing Co. Ltd
- Racing colours
- Trainer: Hirofumi Toda
- Jockey: Masayoshi Ebina
- Record: 18: 7-2-0
- Earnings: 629,108,000 JPY

Major wins
- Aoba Sho (2012); St Lite Kinen (2012); Nikkei Sho (2013); Tenno Sho (Spring) (2013, 2014)

Awards
- World top-rated stayer (2013)

Fenomeno (Japanese: フェノーメノ, Hepburn: Fenoomeno; foaled 20 April 2009) is a Japanese Thoroughbred racehorse and sire. After winning one minor race as a two-year-old he emerged as a top-class performer in the following year, taking the Aoba Sho and St Lite Kinen and finishing a close second in both the Tokyo Yushun and the autumn edition of the Tenno Sho. In his third campaign he won the Nikkei Sho and the spring edition of the Tenno Sho before his season was ended by injury. At the end of that year he was rated the best horse in the world over extended distances. He won a second Tenno Sho in 2014 but failed to win again and was retired to stud at the end of 2015.

== Background ==
Fenomeno is a dark brown horse with a white sock on his right hind leg bred in Hokkaido, Japan by the Oiwake Farm. According to the horse's owner, Sunday Racing, the name Fenomeno comes from the Portuguese word for supernatural events and monster. His trainer, Hirofumi Toda, nicknamed him "Mamechin" (Japanese: マメチン), due to the fact that his coat color resembles a type of sweet black soybean served during New Year’s, known as Kuromame (Japanese: 黒豆).

His sire, Stay Gold, a son of the thirteen-time Leading sire in Japan Sunday Silence, was a successful international performer, winning the Dubai Sheema Classic and the Hong Kong Vase. Standing at stud at the Big Red Farm in Hokkaido, he produced numerous important winners including Gold Ship, Orfevre, and Nakayama Festa. Fenomeno's dam, De Laroche, showed some racing ability, winning a maiden race in her native Ireland as a three-year-old and a minor contest in the United States at four. In November 2003 at the Fasig-Tipton Kentucky Fall sale she was bought for $140,000 by Haruya Yoshida and exported to become a broodmare in Japan. She was a half-sister to the Hong Kong champion Indigenous and as a descendant of the British broodmare Felucca (foaled 1941) was related to numerous major winners in Europe including Bireme, Longboat, Cut Above, Bolas and Sharp Edge.

During his track career Fenomeno was trained by Hirofumi Toda and carried the black, red and yellow colours of Sunday Racing.

== Racing career ==
=== 2011: two-year-old season ===
Fenomeno made his racecourse debut in a contest for previously unraced juveniles over 2000 metres at Tokyo Racecourse on 30 October and came home first ahead of thirteen opponents. He was then moved up in class for the Listed Hopeful Stakes over the same distance at Nakayama Racecourse on 25 December and finished seventh of the sixteen runners behind Admire Blue.

=== 2012: three-year-old season ===
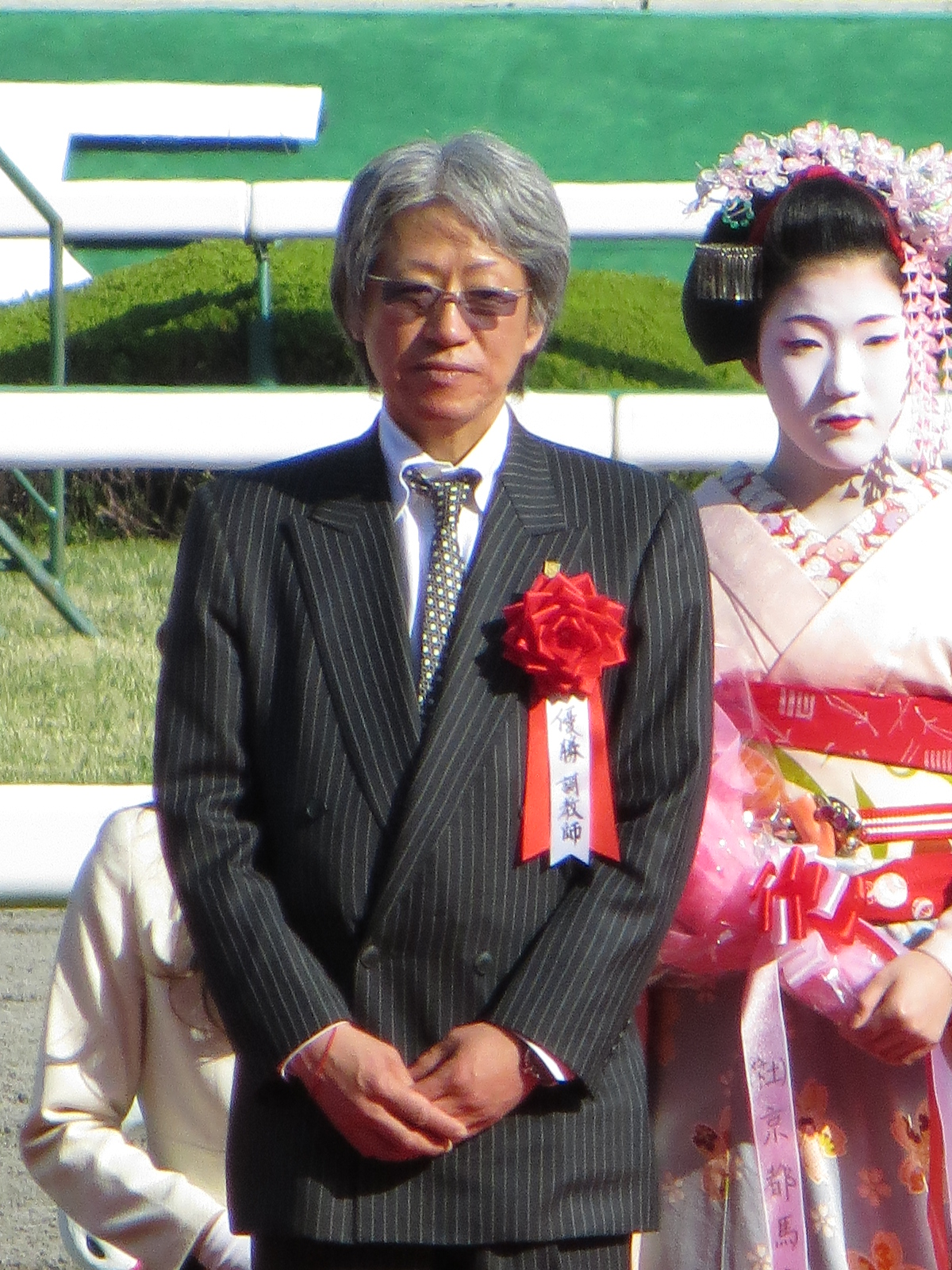
Fenomeno's trainer Hirofumi Toda

On his three-year-old debut, Fenomeno won a minor race over 2000 metres at Tokyo on 29 January, beating the subsequent Tenno Sho (autumn) winner Spielberg into second place. He then stepped up in class for the Yayoi Sho (a trial for the Satsuki Sho) at Nakayama and finished sixth of the fifteen runners behind Cosmo Ozora. On 28 April the colt was moved up in distance for the Grade 2 Aoba Sho over 2400 metres at Tokyo and started the 1.1/1 favourite against sixteen opponents. Ridden by Masayoshi Ebina, who became his regular jockey, he recorded his first important success as he came home two and a half lengths clear of Etendard. The colt was then moved into the highest class to contest the Tokyo Yushun on 27 May in which he started at odds of 13.6/1. He was less fancied than Sunday Racing's other two runners World Ace (the favourite) and Deep Brillante with the best of the other runners appearing to be Gold Ship and Grandezza (Spring Stakes). Coming from well off the pace, Fenomeno produced a strong, sustained run on the outside, but just failed to overhaul Deep Brillante and was beaten by a nose in a photo finish.

After a break of three and a half months, Fenomeno returned at Nakayama in September for the St Lite Kinen, a race which often serves as a trial race for the Kikuka Sho. He started evens (1/1) favourite in a seventeen-runner field and won by a length from the outsider Sky Dignity after taking the lead early in the straight. He was then matched against older horses in the autumn edition of the Tenno Sho over 2000 metres at Tokyo on 28 October and was made the 2.4/1 favourite. He made steady progress on the outside in the straight but was beaten half a length into second place by the five-year-old Eishin Flash. Fenomeno ended his season with a run in the Japan Cup on 25 November in which he stayed on well to finish fifth of the seventeen runners behind Gentildonna, Orfevre, Rulership and Dark Shadow.

=== 2013: four-year-old season ===
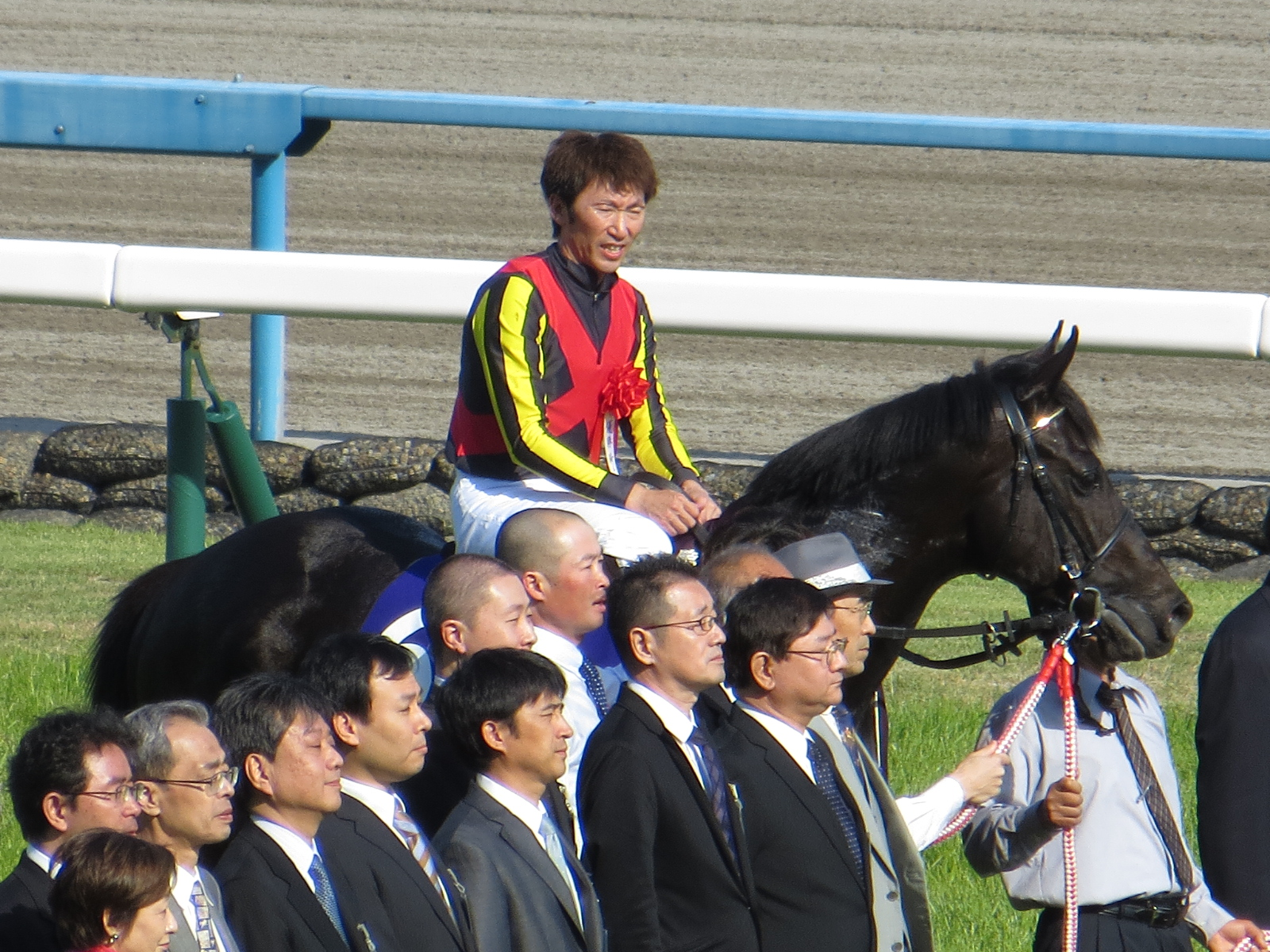
Fenomeno and Masayoshi Ebina after winning the 2013 Tenno Sho

Fenomeno began his third campaign in the Grade 2 Nikkei Sho over 2500 metres at Nakayama on 23 March and started the even money favourite in a fourteen-runner field. After tracking the leaders the colt was switched to the outside in the straight, took the lead inside the last 200 metres and won by one and a half lengths from Capote Star. On 28 April Fenomeno contested Japan's premier extended distance race, the spring edition of the Tenno Sho over 3200 metres at Kyoto Racecourse and started the 5.2/1 second choice in the betting behind the odds-on favourite Gold Ship. The veterans Meiner Kittz and Jaguar Mail, winners of the race in 2009 and 2010 respectively were again in the field while the other fourteen runners included Red Cadeaux and Admire Rakti. After racing in mid-division, Fenomeno moved up to join the leaders on the final turn and took the lead 400 metres from the finish. He accelerated clear of the field and won "readily" by one and a quarter lengths from Tosen Ra with Red Cadeaux three and a quarter lengths back in third. After the race Ebina said "I just wanted to get into a good position during the trip, which I managed to do. He had a good first lap which I thought was key. I wasn’t sure what the pace was like; all I was thinking about was keeping the horse in a good rhythm. I was expecting Gold Ship to come and get us at some point but I wasn’t worrying about it. If he passes us, he passes us. My job was to get the most out of my horse."

In June Fenomeno dropped back in trip for the 2200 metre Takarazuka Kinen at Hanshin Racecourse. He looked to be outpaced in the closing stages but kept on well to take fourth place behind Gold Ship, Danon Ballade and Gentildonna. The colt then had injury problems and did not race again in 2013.

=== 2014: five-year-old season ===
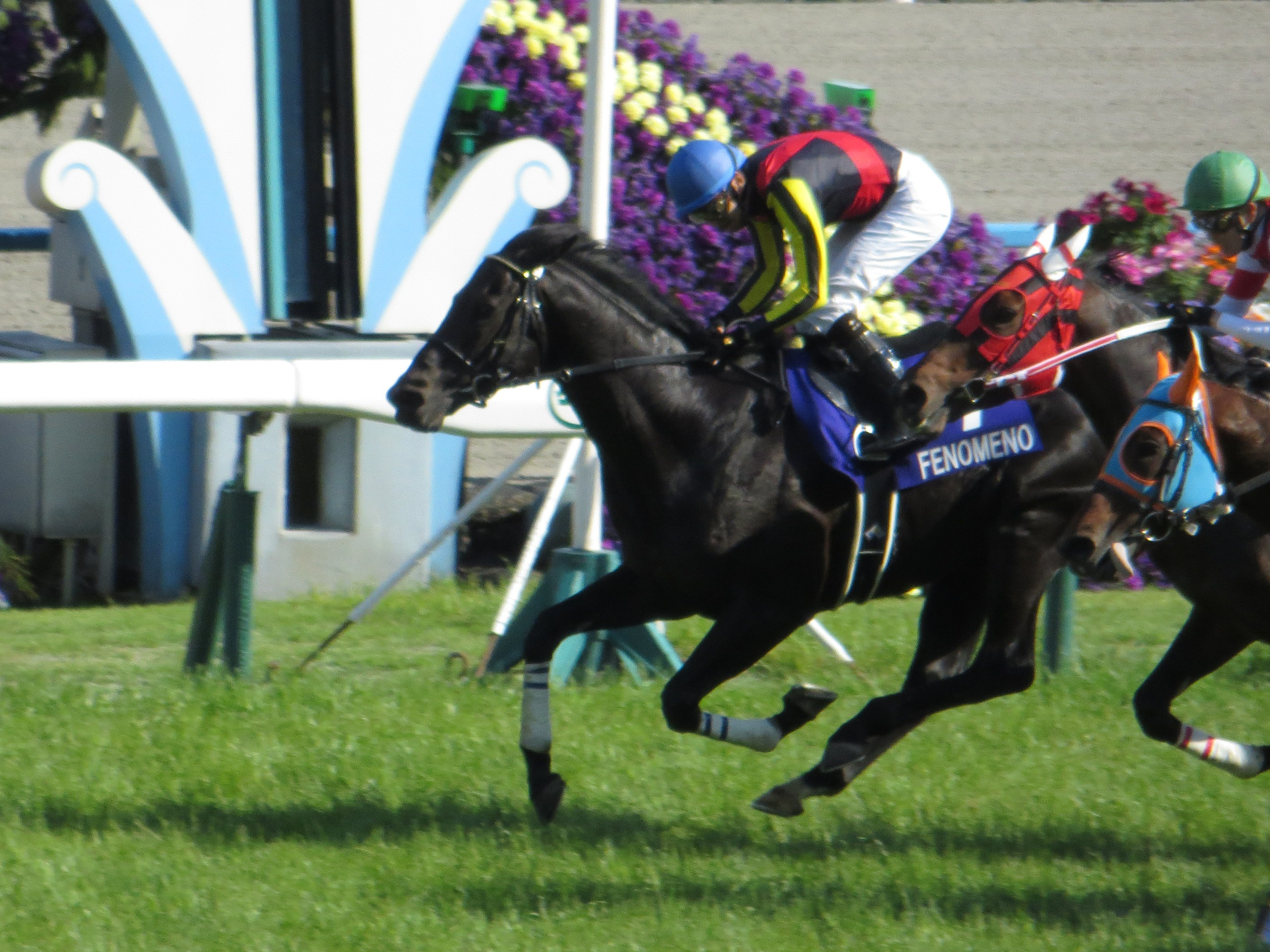
Fenomeno wins his second Tenno Sho

On 29 March, after an absence of over nine months, Fenomeno returned in the Nikkei Sho at Nakayama. He was unable to repeat his success of 2013, but ran creditably to finish fifth of the fifteen runners behind the six-year-old favourite Win Variation, beaten just over three lengths by the winner. On 4 May at Kyoto Fenomeno attempted to become the third horse, after Mejiro McQueen and T M Opera O, to win consecutive runnings of the spring Tenno Sho and started the 10.5/1 fourth choice in the betting behind Kizuna, Gold Ship and Win Variation. Admire Rakti, Red Cadeaux and Jaguar Mail were again in the eighteen-runner field but the only other horses to start at less than 50/1 were Desperado (Kyoto Kinen) and Satono Noblesse (runner-up in the Kikuka Sho). After racing along the inside rail, Fenomeno was switched to the outside to make his challenge in the straight. He took the lead 200 metres out and held on to win in a very tight finish by a neck, a nose and half a length from Win Variation, Hokko Brave and Kizuna. After the race Ebina said "This win is the result of the stable staff that really made a great effort to bring him back to form. He got me worried early because he was a bit keen but I knew he would make it when he put in a breather passing the stand the first time. I just concentrated on giving our best performance instead of worrying about the other horses".

Fenomeno returned on 2 November in the autumn Tenno Sho in which he finished unplaced behind Spielberg. Ebina was replaced as Fenomeno's jockey after this race but the horse showed no improvement in two subsequent starts that year. He came home eighth behind Epiphaneia in the Japan Cup and then ran unplaced in the Arima Kinen at Nakayama on 28 December.

=== 2015: six-year-old season ===
On his first and ultimately only appearance as a six-year-old, Fenomeno ran for the third time in the Nikkei Sho but made no impression and finished eighth of the twelve runners behind Admire Deus. Fenomeno was supposed to run the Tenno Sho (Spring) once again, but it was announced that the horse would not run the race citing issues with his right foreleg, before ultimately being announced that the horse would be retired due to tendinitis.

== Assessment and awards ==
In the 2012 edition of the World Thoroughbred Racehorse Rankings Fenomeno was rated the ninth-best three-year-old colt, and the 57th best horse in the world of any age or sex. In 2013, Fenomeno was rated the 38th best racehorse in the world in the World's Best Racehorse Rankings and the best in the world in the extended distance division. He was ranked 105th in the world in 2014.

== Breeding record ==
Fenomeno was retired from racing to become a breeding stallion at the Shadai Stallion Station. His first foals were born in 2017.

In late 2018, Fenomeno was moved from the Shadai Stallion Station to Lex Stud.

Fenomeno retired from stud in 2021, and became a lead horse at Oiwake Farm.

== In popular culture ==
An anthropomorphized version of Fenomeno appears as a character in the Japanese multimedia franchise Umamusume: Pretty Derby, voiced by Yuriko Hibi. A member of Tracen Academy's Public Discipline Committee, she styles herself as a police officer dedicated to maintaining order and safety for the public, but her intimidating appearance and tendency to speak loudly causes people, especially children, to be afraid of her. On the other hand, once she gains the trust of younger Umamusume, they would follow her without hesitation, referring to the real horse's post-retirement role as herd leader in Oiwake Farm. Fenomeno is also often on the receiving end of pranks, most notably from Gold Ship, Nakayama Festa, and Orfevre. Gold Ship regularly refers to Fenomeno by the nickname "Mamechin" and attempts to goad the player trainer to refer to her as such, much to her embarrassment. Due to her real-world counterpart being a direct progeny of Stay Gold, Fenomeno is part of a friend group of her admirers called the "Gold Clan" that is led by Stay Gold herself and includes Gold Ship, Nakayama Festa, Orfevre, and Dream Journey.

== Racing form ==
Fenomeno won seven races out of 18 starts. The data available is based on JBIS and netkeiba. All the races were on turf.

Date	Track	Race	Grade	Distance (Condition)	Entry	HN	Odds (Favored)	Finish	Time	Margins	Jockey	Winner (Runner-up)
2011 – two-year-old season
Oct 30	Tokyo	2yo debut		2,000m (Firm)	14	10	7.1 (4)	1st	2:03.5	0.0	Yasunari Iwata	(Shadow Party)
Dec 25	Nakayama	Hopeful Stakes	OP	2,000m (Firm)	16	2	4.0 (1)	7th	2:01.7	0.3	Yasunari Iwata	Admire Blue
2012 – three-year-old season
Jan 29	Tokyo	3yo allowance	1W	2,000m (Firm)	14	2	3.6 (2)	1st	2:00.9	–0.3	Yasunari Iwata	(Spielberg)
Mar 4	Nakayama	Yayoi Sho	2	2,000m (Good)	15	8	3.6 (2)	6th	2:04.3	0.4	Yasunari Iwata	Cosmo Ozora
Apr 28	Tokyo	Aoba Sho	2	2,400m (Firm)	17	7	2.1 (1)	1st	2:25.7	–0.4	Masayoshi Ebina	(Etendard)
May 27	Tokyo	Tokyo Yushun	1	2,400m (Firm)	18	11	14.6 (5)	2nd	2:23.8	0.0	Masayoshi Ebina	Deep Brillante
Sep 17	Nakayama	St. Lite Kinen	2	2,200m (Firm)	17	12	2.0 (1)	1st	2:10.8	–0.2	Masayoshi Ebina	(Sky Dignity)
Oct 28	Tokyo	Tennō Shō (Autumn)	1	2,000m (Firm)	18	4	3.4 (1)	2nd	1:57.4	0.1	Masayoshi Ebina	Eishin Flash
Nov 25	Tokyo	Japan Cup	1	2,400m (Firm)	17	4	8.0 (4)	5th	2:23.9	0.8	Masayoshi Ebina	Gentildonna
2013 – four-year-old season
Mar 23	Nakayama	Nikkei Sho	2	2,500m (Firm)	14	14	2.0 (1)	1st	2:32.0	–0.2	Masayoshi Ebina	(Capote Star)
Apr 28	Kyoto	Tennō Shō (Spring)	1	3,200m (Firm)	18	6	6.2 (2)	1st	3:14.2	–0.2	Masayoshi Ebina	(Tosen Ra)
Jun 23	Hanshin	Takarazuka Kinen	1	2,200m (Firm)	11	3	3.2 (3)	4th	2:13.9	0.7	Masayoshi Ebina	Gold Ship
2014 – five-year-old season
Mar 29	Nakayama	Nikkei Sho	2	2,500m (Firm)	15	8	3.7 (2)	5th	2:34.9	0.5	Masayoshi Ebina	Win Variation
May 4	Kyoto	Tennō Shō (Spring)	1	3,200m (Firm)	18	7	11.5 (4)	1st	3:15.1	0.0	Masayoshi Ebina	(Win Variation)
Nov 2	Tokyo	Tennō Shō (Autumn)	1	2,000m (Firm)	18	9	4.9 (3)	14th	2:00.4	0.7	Masayoshi Ebina	Spielberg
Nov 30	Tokyo	Japan Cup	1	2,400m (Firm)	18	16	18.2 (9)	8th	2:24.2	1.1	Yasunari Iwata	Epiphaneia
Dec 28	Nakayama	Arima Kinen	1	2,500m (Firm)	16	10	15.3 (6)	10th	2:35.7	0.4	Hiroyuki Tanabe	Gentildonna
2015 – six-year-old season
Mar 28	Nakayama	Nikkei Sho	2	2,500m (Firm)	12	9	4.5 (2)	8th	2:30.9	0.7	Keita Tosaki	Admire Deus

== Pedigree ==
Pedigree of Fenomeno (JPN), brown stallion, 2009
Sire Stay Gold (JPN) 1994	Sunday Silence (USA); 1986	Halo	Hail To Reason
Sire Stay Gold (JPN) 1994	Sunday Silence (USA); 1986	Halo	Cosmah
Sire Stay Gold (JPN) 1994	Sunday Silence (USA); 1986	Wishing Well	Understanding
Sire Stay Gold (JPN) 1994	Sunday Silence (USA); 1986	Wishing Well	Mountain Flower
Sire Stay Gold (JPN) 1994	Golden Sash (JPN); 1988	Dictus	Sanctus
Sire Stay Gold (JPN) 1994	Golden Sash (JPN); 1988	Dictus	Doronic
Sire Stay Gold (JPN) 1994	Golden Sash (JPN); 1988	Dyna Sash	Northern Taste
Sire Stay Gold (JPN) 1994	Golden Sash (JPN); 1988	Dyna Sash	Royal Sash
Dam De Laroche (IRE) 1999	Danehill (USA); 1986	Danzig	Northern Dancer
Dam De Laroche (IRE) 1999	Danehill (USA); 1986	Danzig	Pas de Nom
Dam De Laroche (IRE) 1999	Danehill (USA); 1986	Razyana	His Majesty
Dam De Laroche (IRE) 1999	Danehill (USA); 1986	Razyana	Spring Adieu
Dam De Laroche (IRE) 1999	Sea Port (GB); 1980	Averof	Sing Sing
Dam De Laroche (IRE) 1999	Sea Port (GB); 1980	Averof	Argentina
Dam De Laroche (IRE) 1999	Sea Port (GB); 1980	Anchor	Major Portion
Dam De Laroche (IRE) 1999	Sea Port (GB); 1980	Anchor	Ripeck (Family: 11-d)

Fenomeno is inbred 4 x 5 to Northern Dancer
