= Isla Bonita =

Japanese-bred Thoroughbred racehorse

Isla Bonita イスラボニータ
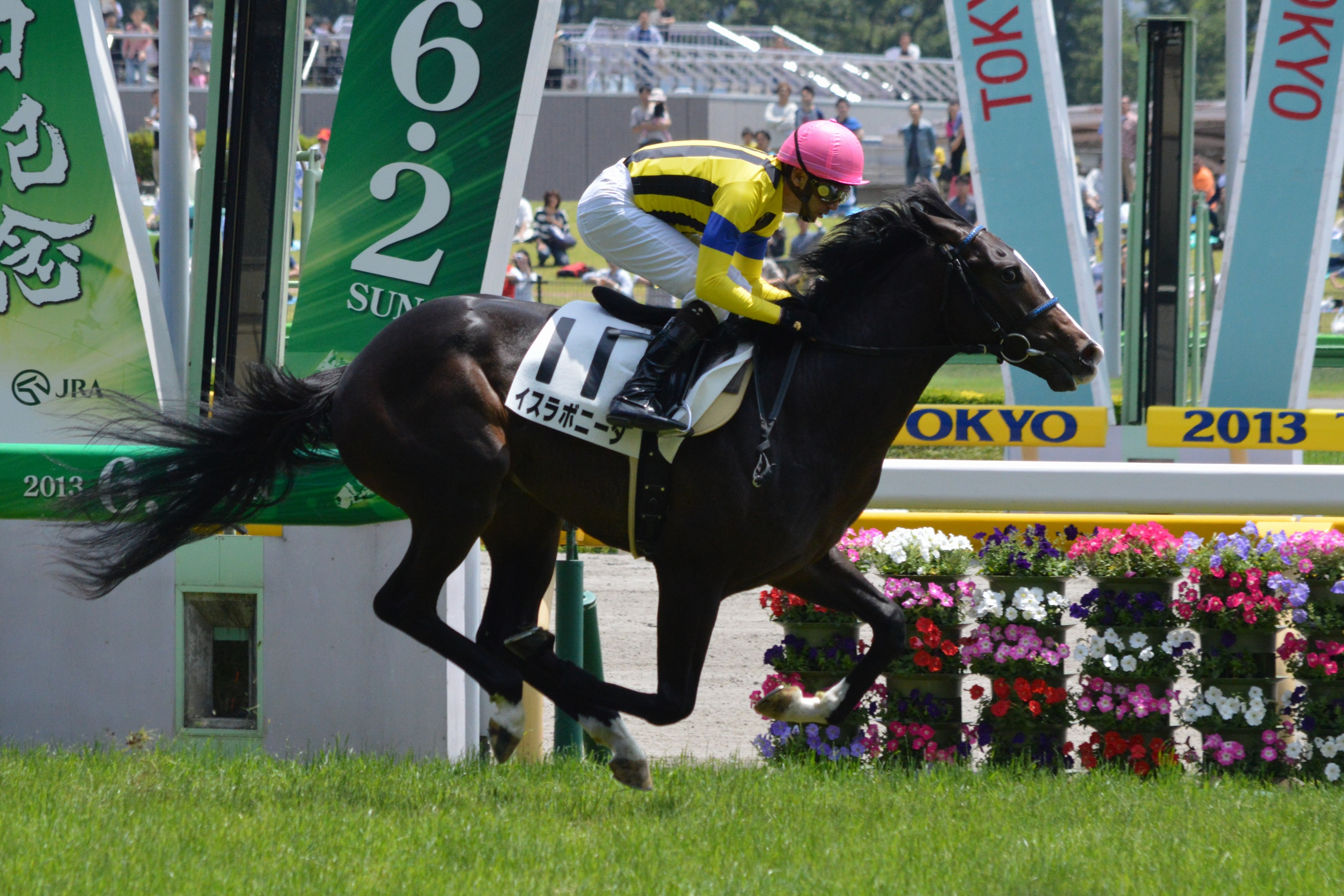
- Isla Bonita at Tokyo Racecourse
- Sire: Fuji Kiseki
- Grandsire: Sunday Silence
- Dam: Isla Cozzene
- Damsire: Cozzene
- Sex: Stallion
- Foaled: 21 May 2011
- Country: Japan
- Colour: Dark bay
- Breeder: Shadai Racing Corporation
- Owner: Shadai Racing Corporation
- Racing colours
- Trainer: Hironori Kurita
- Jockey: Masayoshi Ebina; Christophe Lemaire
- Record: 25: 8-6-4
- Earnings: JPY752,027,000

Major wins
- Tokyo Sports Hai Nisai Stakes (2013); Kyodo Tsushin Hai (2013); St Lite Kinen (2014); Yomiuri Milers Cup (2017); Hanshin Cup (2017); Japanese Classic Race wins: Satsuki Sho (2014)

Awards
- JRA Award for Best Three-Year-Old Colt (2014)

Isla Bonita (Japanese: イスラボニータ, Hepburn: Isura Bonīta; foaled 21 May 2011) is a Japanese Thoroughbred racehorse and sire. As a juvenile in 2013 he showed very promising form as he won three of his four races including the Icho Stakes and the Tokyo Sports Hai Nisai Stakes. In the following year he took the JRA Award for Best Three-Year-Old Colt after winning the Kyodo Tsushin Hai, Satsuki Sho and St Lite Kinen as well as finishing second in the Tokyo Yushun and third in the autumn edition of the Tenno Sho. He failed to win in the next two years but ran well in several major races, being placed in the Tenno Sho and two runnings of the Mile Championship. In his final season he returned to winning form, taking the Yomiuri Milers Cup and the Hanshin Cup.

== Background ==
Isla Bonita is a dark bay or brown horse standing 1.61 metres high, with a broad white blaze and three white socks bred and owned by the Shadai Racing Corporation. During his racing career he was trained by Hironori Kurita.

He was sired by the undefeated champion Fuji Kiseki whose four wins included the Grade 1 Asahi Hai Sansai Stakes in 1994. As a breeding stallion he sired several other major winners including Straight Girl, Kane Hekili, Danon Chantilly (NHK Mile Cup), Sadamu Patek (Mile Championship), Fine Grain (Takamatsunomiya Kinen) and Kinshasa No Kiseki (Takamatsunomiya Kinen). Isla Bonita's dam Isla Cozzene was an American mare whose wins included the Listed Hawthorne Oaks in 2005.

== Racing career ==
=== 2013: two-year-old season ===
On 2 June at Tokyo Racecourse Isla Bonita made a successful racecourse debut when he won an event for previously unraced juveniles over 1600 metres. In August at Niigata Racecourse he was stepped up in class for the Grade 3 Niigata Nisai Stakes and was beaten three lengths into second place by the filly Harp Star. At Tokyo in October the colt was dropped back to Listed class for the Icho Stakes over 1800 metres and won from Win Phoenix and ten others. For his final run of the year Isla Bonita started the 4.3/1 second favourite behind Satono Aladdin in the Grade 3 Tokyo Sports Hai Nisai Stakes over 1800 metres at Tokyo. Ridden by Masayoshi Ebina he won in a race record time of 1:45.9 by a neck from Pray And Real with Clarity City a length and a quarter back in third place.

=== 2014: three-year-old season ===
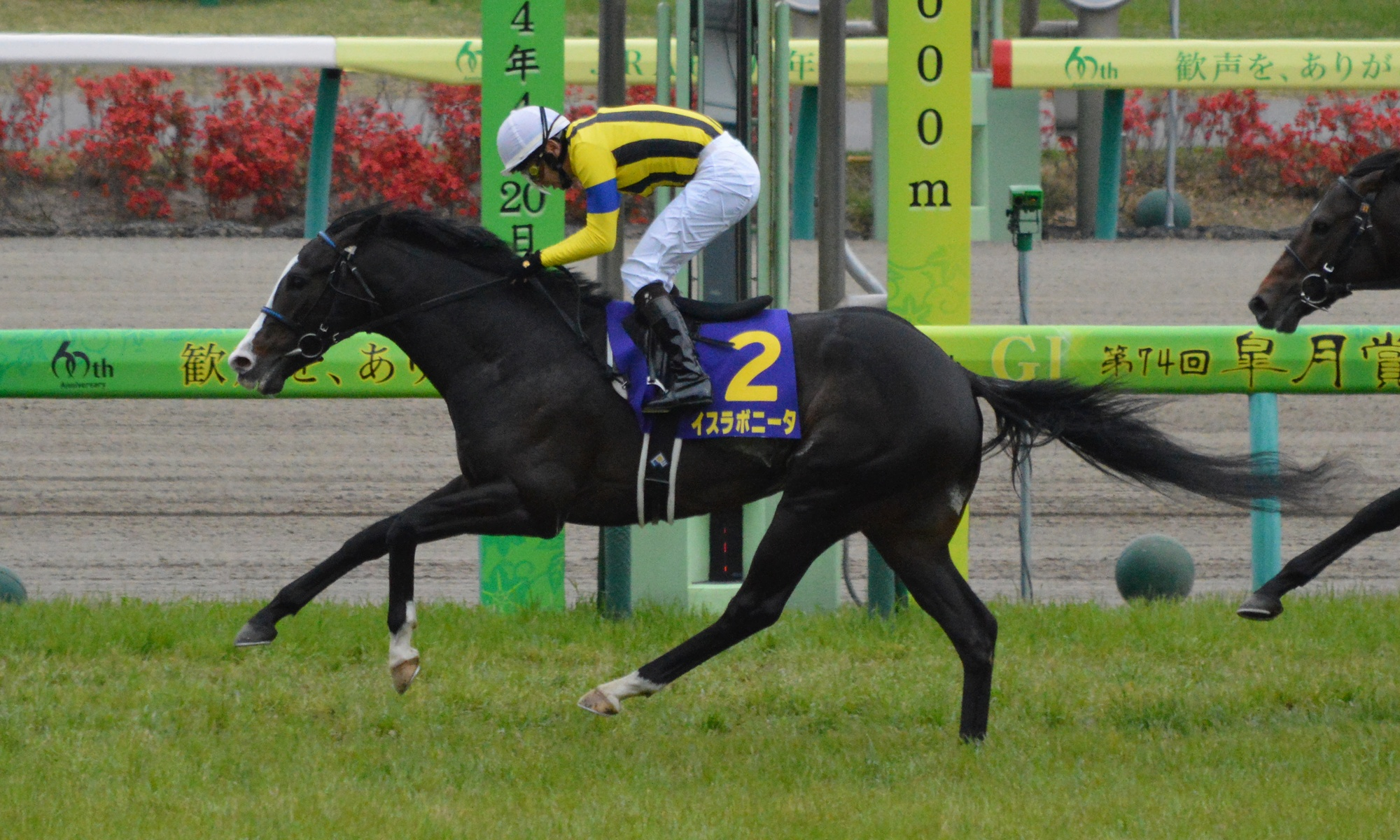
Isla Bonita wins the Satsuki Sho

On 24 February Isla Bonita began his second campaign in the Kyodo News Service Hai (a trial race for the Satsuki Sho) over 1800 metres at Tokyo. He headed the betting at odds of 6/5 and won by one and a quarter lengths from Bell Canyon, with two lengths back to Satono Aladdin in third. On his next appearance Isla Bonita, with Ebina in the saddle, was made the 4.1/1 second choice in the betting for the 74th running of the Satsuki Sho over 2000 metres at Nakayama Racecourse. The Yayoi Sho winner To The World started favourite, with the other sixteen runners including Asia Express, Rosa Gigantea (Spring Stakes), Tosen Stardom (Kisaragi Sho), One And Only (Radio Nikkei Hai Nisai Stakes), Clarity City and Bell Canyon. After racing in mid-division Isla Bonita moved up on the outside on the final turn and moved up to dispute the lead with Win Full Bloom, To The World, and Asia Express 200 metres from the finish. He drew ahead in the closing stages to win by one and a quarter lengths and half a length from To The World and Win Full Bloom in a time of 1:59.6. After the race Ebina said "I tried to race him with his own pace until the first corner and took him to the outside to avoid the crowd. He was responding well, and as I was able to race him towards the front, I urged him to go earlier. Although he seemed a bit distracted, he was able rally strongly with the other horses. He is able to run a smooth race and I think the Tokyo racecourse, where the Japanese Derby is held, will suit him well".

On 1 June Isla Bonita was stepped up in distance and was made the 1.7/1 favourite for the Japanese Derby over 2400 metres at Tokyo. After tracking the front-runners in third he moved up to dispute the lead in the straight but was outrun in the closing stages and beaten three quarters of a length into second place by One And Only.

After three and a half months Isla Bonita returned in autumn for the St Lite Kinen (usually a trial race for the Kikuka Sho) over 2200 metres at Niigata on 21 September. He started the 2/5 favourite in an eighteen-runner field and won by one and a quarter lengths from To The World. Isla Bonita bypassed the Kikuka Sho and was matched against older horses for the first time in the autumn edition of the Tenno Sho over 2000 metres at Tokyo on 2 November. Ridden by Christophe Lemaire he started favourite and finished a close third behind the five-year-olds Spielberg and Gentildonna. On his final run of the season four weeks later he came home ninth of the seventeen finishers behind Epiphaneia in the Japan Cup.

In the 2014 World's Best Racehorse Rankings, Isla Bonita was given a rating of 117, making him the 105th best horse in the world.

In January 2015 Isla Bonita was named Best Three-Year-Old Colt at the JRA Awards for 2014 taking 170 of the 285 votes.

=== 2015 & 2016: four and five-year-old seasons ===
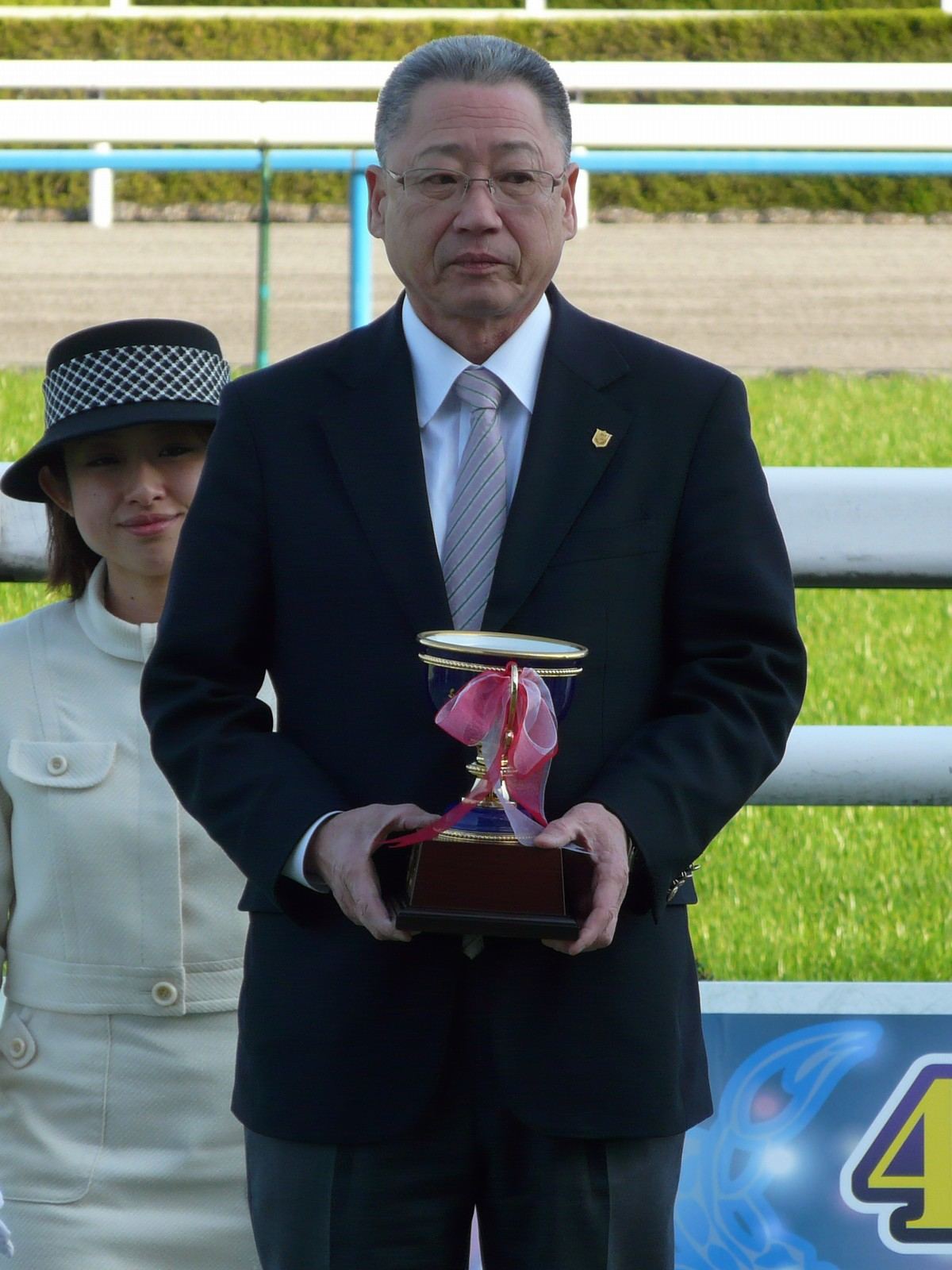
Isla Bonita's trainer Hironori Kurita

Isla Bonita began his 2015 season by coming home fifth behind the filly Nuovo Record when favourite for the Nakayama Kinen on 1 March. He was then off the track for over seven months before running third to A Shin Hikari in the Mainichi Okan at Tokyo on 11 October. On 1 November he ran for the second time in the autumn Tenno Sho and finished third of the eighteen runners beaten half a length and three quarters of a length by Lovely Day and Staphanos. For his final run of 2015 the colt was dropped back in distance for the Mile Championship over 1600 metres at Kyoto Racecourse three weeks later and started favourite. He recovered from a poor start to produce a strong late run but was unable to catch the leaders and came home third behind Maurice and Fiero. Despite failing to win a race, Isla Bonita's earnings for the year came to ¥86,216,000, equivalent to approximately $770,000. His rating of 116 placed him 139th in the 2015 World's Best Racehorse Rankings.

Isla Bonita did not produce his best form in the spring of 2016, finishing ninth to Duramente in the Nakayama Kinen, fifth to Ambitious in the Osaka Hai and fifth to Logotype in the Yasuda Kinen. The last named race was the last in which the horse was partnered by Ebina: Lemaire rode Isla Bonita in all of his subsequent races. The horse returned from a four and a half month summer break to finish second to Young Man Power in the Grade 3 Fuji Stakes over 1600 metres at Tokyo in October. In the following month he ran for the second time in the Mile Championship for which he started the 3.8/1 second favourite. After racing in sixth place he produced an "impressive late charge" on the outside but failed by a head to overhaul Mikki Isle. On 24 December he was dropped back to 1400 metres for the Grade 2 Hanshin Cup and finished second, beaten a head by the three-year-old Shuji. His earnings for the season totaled ¥102,518,000 (about $916,000) and his end-of-year rating of 117 placed him 110th in the 2016 World's Best Racehorse Rankings.

=== 2017: six-year-old season ===
On his first run of 2017 Isla Bonita started second favourite behind Air Spinel in the Yomiuri Milers Cup over 1600 metres at Kyoto on 23 April in an eleven-runner field which also included Young Man Power and Fiero. He recorded his first victory in more than two and a half years as he won by half a length from Air Spinel. On 4 June he started favourite for the Yasuda Kinen but was repeatedly denied a clear run in the straight and came home eighth of the eighteen runners behind Satono Aladdin.

After the summer break Isla Bonita began his autumn campaign in the Fuji Stakes on 21 October and finished second, two lengths behind the winner Air Spinel. In November he started favourite in his third attempt to win the Mile Championship. He again encountered trouble in running before staying on strongly in the closing stages to finish fifth, one and a half lengths behind the three-year-old winner Persian Knight. On his final racecourse appearance Isla Bonita started the 3.1/1 second choice in the betting behind Mozu Ascot in an eighteen-runner field for the Hanshin Cup on 24 December. He ended his track career with a victory as he prevailed by a nose from the seven-year-old Dance Director. The winning time of 1:19.5 was a new race record.

In the 2017 World's Best Racehorse Rankings, he was rated at 117, making him the 129th best racehorse in the world.

== Racing form ==
Isla Bonita won eight races and placed in ten more podiums out of 25 starts. This data is available based on JBIS and netkeiba.

Date	Track	Race	Grade	Distance (Condition)	Entry	HN	Odds (Favored)	Finish	Time	Margins	Jockey	Winner (Runner-up)
2013 – two-year-old season
Jun 2	Tokyo	2yo Newcomer		1,600 m (Firm)	12	11	4.3 (2)	1st	1:37.9	–0.2	Masayoshi Ebina	(Pearly Shell)
Aug 25	Niigata	Niigata Nisai Stakes	3	1,600 m (Firm)	18	3	8.5 (4)	2nd	1:35.0	0.5	Masayoshi Ebina	Harp Star
Oct 19	Tokyo	Icho Stakes	OP	1,800 m (Firm)	12	2	4.4 (3)	1st	1:49.6	–0.2	Masayoshi Ebina	(Win Phoenix)
Nov 16	Tokyo	Tokyo Sports Hai Nisai Stakes	3	1,800 m (Firm)	15	1	5.3 (2)	1st	R1:45.9	0.0	Masayoshi Ebina	(Pray and Real)
2014 – three-year-old season
Feb 24	Tokyo	Kyodo News Service Hai	3	1,800 m (Firm)	14	7	2.2 (1)	1st	1:48.1	–0.2	Masayoshi Ebina	(Bell Canyon)
Apr 20	Nakayama	Satsuki Sho	1	2,000 m (Firm)	18	2	5.1 (2)	1st	1:59.6	–0.2	Masayoshi Ebina	(To The World)
Jun 1	Tokyo	Tokyo Yushun	1	2,400 m (Firm)	17	13	2.7 (1)	2nd	2:24.7	0.1	Masayoshi Ebina	One and Only
Sep 21	Niigata	St Lite Kinen	2	2,200 m (Firm)	18	5	1.4 (1)	1st	2:11.7	–0.2	Masayoshi Ebina	(To The World)
Nov 2	Tokyo	Tenno Sho (Autumn)	1	2,000 m (Firm)	18	15	2.8 (1)	3rd	1:59.8	0.1	Christophe Lemaire	Spielberg
Nov 30	Tokyo	Japan Cup	1	2,400 m (Firm)	18	9	9.5 (5)	9th	2:24.4	1.3	Masayoshi Ebina	Epiphaneia
2015 – four-year-old season
Mar 1	Nakayama	Nakayama Kinen	2	1,800 m (Good)	11	10	2.1 (1)	5th	1:50.7	0.4	Masayoshi Ebina	Nuovo Record
Oct 11	Tokyo	Mainichi Okan	2	1,800 m (Firm)	13	6	9.2 (7)	3rd	1:45.8	0.2	Masayoshi Ebina	A Shin Hikari
Nov 1	Tokyo	Tenno Sho (Autumn)	1	2,000 m (Firm)	18	16	11.7 (6)	3rd	1:58.6	0.2	Masayoshi Ebina	Lovely Day
Nov 22	Kyoto	Mile Championship	1	1,600 m (Firm)	18	5	3.2 (1)	3rd	1:33.0	0.2	Masayoshi Ebina	Maurice
2016 – five-year-old season
Feb 28	Nakayama	Nakayama Kinen	2	1,800 m (Firm)	11	6	5.7 (3)	9th	1:46.9	1.0	Masayoshi Ebina	Duramente
Apr 3	Hanshin	Sankei Osaka Hai	2	2,000 m (Firm)	11	4	18.5 (7)	5th	1:59.9	0.6	Masayoshi Ebina	Ambitious
Jun 5	Tokyo	Yasuda Kinen	1	1,600 m (Firm)	12	9	11.6 (4)	5th	1:33.3	0.3	Masayoshi Ebina	Logotype
Oct 22	Tokyo	Fuji Stakes	3	1,600 m (Firm)	11	4	6.9 (4)	2nd	1:34.1	0.1	Christophe Lemaire	Young Man Power
Nov 20	Kyoto	Mile Championship	1	1,600 m (Firm)	18	8	4.8 (2)	2nd	1:33.1	0.0	Christophe Lemaire	Mikki Isle
Dec 24	Hanshin	Hanshin Cup	2	1,400 m (Good)	15	6	3.8 (2)	2nd	1:21.9	0.0	Christophe Lemaire	Shuji
2017 – six-year-old season
Apr 23	Kyoto	Yomiuri Milers Cup	2	1,600 m (Firm)	11	11	3.8 (2)	1st	1:32.2	–0.1	Christophe Lemaire	(Air Spinel)
Jun 4	Tokyo	Yasuda Kinen	1	1,600 m (Firm)	18	15	3.5 (1)	8th	1:31.9	0.4	Christophe Lemaire	Satono Aladdin
Oct 21	Tokyo	Fuji Stakes	3	1,600 m (Heavy)	15	15	5.0 (4)	2nd	1:35.1	0.3	Christophe Lemaire	Air Spinel
Nov 19	Kyoto	Mile Championship	1	1,600 m (Good)	18	12	3.9 (1)	5th	1:34.1	0.3	Christophe Lemaire	Persian Knight
Dec 23	Hanshin	Hanshin Cup	2	1,400 m (Firm)	18	2	4.1 (2)	1st	R1:19.5	0.0	Christophe Lemaire	(Dance Director)

Legend:
Turf

- R indicated that it was a record time finish

== Stud record ==
After the end of his racing career, Isla Bonita became a breeding stallion at the Shadai Stallion Station in Hokkaido.

=== Notable progeny ===
Below data is based on JBIS Stallion Reports.

c = colt, f = filly, g = gelding

Foaled	Name	Sex	Major Wins
2019	Purpur Ray	c	Falcon Stakes
2019	Yamanin Salvum	c	Chunichi Shimbun Hai, Niigata Daishoten
2019	Costa Bonita	f	Fukushima Himba Stakes
2019	Tudo de Bom	c	Sekiya Kinen
2021	Yamanin al Rihla	c	Kitakyushu Kinen
2022	Nishino Agent	c	Keisei Hai
2023	Altramuz	c	Mainichi Hai

== Pedigree ==
Pedigree of Isla Bonita (JPN), dark bay colt 2011
Sire Fuji Kiseki (JPN) 1992	Sunday Silence (USA); 1986	Halo	Hail to Reason
Sire Fuji Kiseki (JPN) 1992	Sunday Silence (USA); 1986	Halo	Cosmah
Sire Fuji Kiseki (JPN) 1992	Sunday Silence (USA); 1986	Wishing Well	Understanding
Sire Fuji Kiseki (JPN) 1992	Sunday Silence (USA); 1986	Wishing Well	Mountain Flower
Sire Fuji Kiseki (JPN) 1992	Millracer (USA); 1983	Le Fabuleux (FR)	Wild Risk
Sire Fuji Kiseki (JPN) 1992	Millracer (USA); 1983	Le Fabuleux (FR)	Anguar
Sire Fuji Kiseki (JPN) 1992	Millracer (USA); 1983	Marston's Mill	In Reality
Sire Fuji Kiseki (JPN) 1992	Millracer (USA); 1983	Marston's Mill	Millicent
Dam Isla Cozzene (USA) 2002	Cozzene (USA); 1980	Caro (IRE)	Fortino (FR)
Dam Isla Cozzene (USA) 2002	Cozzene (USA); 1980	Caro (IRE)	Chambord (GB)
Dam Isla Cozzene (USA) 2002	Cozzene (USA); 1980	Ride the Trails	Prince John
Dam Isla Cozzene (USA) 2002	Cozzene (USA); 1980	Ride the Trails	Wildwook
Dam Isla Cozzene (USA) 2002	Isla Mujeres (USA); 1995	Crafty Prospector	Mr. Prospector
Dam Isla Cozzene (USA) 2002	Isla Mujeres (USA); 1995	Crafty Prospector	Real Crafty Lady
Dam Isla Cozzene (USA) 2002	Isla Mujeres (USA); 1995	Lido Isle	Far North
Dam Isla Cozzene (USA) 2002	Isla Mujeres (USA); 1995	Lido Isle	She Is Gorgeous (Family: 4-n)
