= Gentildonna =

Japanese-bred Thoroughbred racehorse (2009–2025)

Gentildonna ジェンティルドンナ
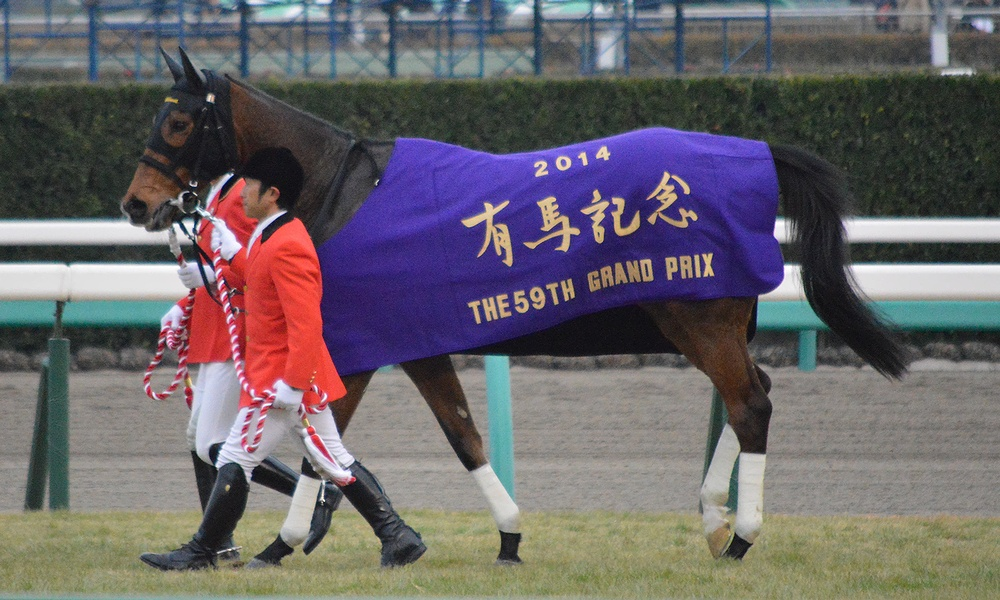
- Gentildonna at the 2014 Arima Kinen awards ceremony.
- Breed: Thoroughbred
- Sire: Deep Impact (JPN)
- Grandsire: Sunday Silence (USA)
- Dam: Donna Blini (GB)
- Damsire: Bertolini (USA)
- Sex: Mare
- Foaled: February 20, 2009
- Died: November 25, 2025 (aged 16)
- Country: Japan
- Colour: Bay
- Breeder: Northern Farm
- Owner: Sunday Racing Co Ltd
- Racing colours
- Trainer: Sei Ishizaka
- Jockey: Yasunari Iwata; Ryan Moore
- Record: 19: 10-4-1
- Earnings: ¥1,726,030,700 (US$18,468,392)

Major wins
- Shinzan Kinen (2012); Rose Stakes (2012); Japan Cup (2012, 2013); Dubai Sheema Classic (2014); Arima Kinen (2014); Japanese Classic Tiara Race wins: Oka Sho (2012); Yushun Himba (2012); Shuka Sho (2012)

Awards
- 4th Japanese Triple Tiara Champion (2012); JRA Award for Best Three-Year-Old Filly (2012); Japanese Horse of the Year (2012, 2014); JRA Award for Best Older Filly or Mare (2013, 2014)

Honours
- Japan Racing Association Hall of Fame (2016); Timeform rating: 128

Gentildonna (Japanese: ジェンティルドンナ, Hepburn: Jentirudonna; 20 February 2009 – 25 November 2025) was a Japanese Thoroughbred racehorse and broodmare. In 2012, she became the fourth filly to win the Japanese Triple Tiara and was voted Japanese Horse of the Year. She was also the first three-year-old filly to win the Japan Cup, as well as the first two-time winner of that race. In 2014, she added a victory in the Dubai Sheema Classic and finished her racing career by winning the Arima Kinen, earning her a second Horse of the Year award.

== Background ==
Gentildonna was a bay mare bred in Japan by the Northern Farm in Hokkaido. She was sired by the Japanese Triple Crown winner Deep Impact out of the British mare Donna Blini, who won the Group One Cheveley Park Stakes in 2005. Her full sister Donau Blue won the Kyoto Himba Stakes and Sekiya Kinen. The horse's name comes from the Italian word for "noble lady".

== Racing career ==
=== 2011: two-year-old season ===
Gentildonna began her career by finishing second in a newcomers race but then won a maiden race to finish the season.

=== 2012: three-year-old season ===
Gentildonna began her three-year-old season by winning the Grade 3 Shinzan Kinen against male horses over one mile at Kyoto in January and then finished fourth to Hana's Goal in the Tulip Sho at Hanshin Racecourse in March.

On 8 April, Gentildonna contested the first leg of the Fillies' Triple Crown, the Oka Sho over one mile at Hanshin. Starting at odds of 3.9/1, she won by half a length from Verxina. Gentildonna and Verxina met again in the Yushun Himba (the Japanese Oaks) on 20 May at Tokyo Racecourse. As Gentildonna's regular jockey Yasunari Iwata was on a 4-day suspension in NHK Mile Cup he was replaced by Yuga Kawada. Verxina was preferred in the betting, but Gentildonna won by five lengths to claim the second leg of the Triple Crown.

After a break of almost four months, Gentildonna returned to contest the Rose Stakes at Hanshin and won by one and a half lengths from Verxina. At Kyoto on 14 October, Gentildonna completed the Triple Crown and defeated Verxina for the fourth time in a row when prevailing by a nose in the Shuka Sho. She was the fourth Triple Tiara winner after Apapane in 2010. On 24 November, Gentildonna faced an international field in the Japan Cup a race which had never been won by a three-year-old filly. Her rivals included the 2011 Japanese Horse of the Year Orfevre and the Prix de l'Arc de Triomphe winner Solemia. Ridden by Yasunari Iwata and despite coming from a very wide barrier draw of 15, Gentildonna won by a nose from Orfevre. There was a protest made for interference by the connections of Orfevre, and Gentildonna had to wait 20 long minutes until her triumph was confirmed, at the cost of subsequent 2-day suspension to Iwata.

=== 2013: four-year-old season ===
On 30 March Gentildonna raced outside Japan for the first time when she started the 11/8 favourite for the Dubai Sheema Classic but was beaten two and a quarter lengths by the Irish six-year-old St Nicholas Abbey. After the race, Yasunari Iwata admitted that St Nicholas Abbey had been the better horse on the night, but pointed out that the filly had been forced to race wide for much of the race. Gentildonna was off the course for almost three months before returning in the Takarazuka Kinen at Hanshin Racecourse. She started the 7/5 favourite, but finished third of the eleven runners behind Gold Ship and the five-year-old Danon Ballade.

Gentildonna began her autumn campaign in the Tennō Shō at Tokyo on 27 October. She started the even money favourite, but finished second, beaten four lengths by the four-year-old colt Just A Way. After three consecutive defeats, Yasunari Iwata lost the ride on Gentildonna, and when the filly appeared to defend the Japan Cup on 24 November, she was ridden by the British jockey Ryan Moore who had received a temporary contract from the JRA. In front of a crowd of 89,719, Gentildonna started the 11/10 favourite ahead of Gold Ship on 2.4/1 and Eishin Flash on 3.9/1. The race was run at a slow pace, and Moore positioned Gentildonna just behind the leaders before accelerating through a gap on the inside to take the lead in the straight. In the closing stages the three-year-old filly Denim And Ruby produced a strong run on the wide outside, but Gentildonna held on to win by a nose, becoming the first horse to win the race twice. Commenting on her earlier run of defeats Ishizaka said "I had been training her to win every time, but I was very relieved that she was able to claim the Cup again in her last start of the season. Thinking about our staff; they've put in so much effort. The fans still believed in her. I was much relieved that she was able to prove she's still a very special horse".

=== 2014: five-year-old season ===
Gentildonna began her 2014 season in the Group Two Kyōto Kinen on 16 February. She started the odds-on favourite but finished sixth of the twelve runners behind the 33/1 outsider Desperado. As in the previous season, Gentildonna was sent to Dubai to contest the Dubai Sheema Classic on 29 March. Ridden by Ryan Moore, she started the 4/1 second favourite behind the Breeders' Cup Turf winner Magician. The mare was restrained in the early stages before making progress with three furlongs to run but was blocked when challenging for the lead in the straight forcing Moore to switch sharply to the right in the closing stages. Gentildonna took the lead from Cirrus des Aigles a furlong from the finish and won "comfortably" by one and a half lengths. Moore said "I was just hemmed in a bit in the straight. But when I pulled her out she has quickened up very well. She has got an awful lot of heart". On her return to Japan, the mare again contested the Takarazuka Kinen at Hanshin Racecourse but finished seventh of the twelve runners, seven and a half lengths behind the winner Gold Ship.

After a four-month summer break, Gentildonna returned to contest Japan's three most important autumn races, beginning with the Tenno Sho on 2 November. Ridden for the first time by Keita Tosaki she finished second of the eighteen runners, beaten three quarters of a length by Spielberg with the favourite Isla Bonita taking third ahead of Love Is Boo Shet. On 3 November she started favourite against seventeen opponents as she attempted to win the Japan Cup for an unprecedented third time. Ridden again by Moore she finished fourth behind Epiphaneia, Just A Way and Spielberg. The Arima Kinen over 2500 metres at Nakayama Racecourse on 28 December attracted its customary strong field, and Gentildonna started fourth in the betting behind Gold Ship, Epiphaneia and Just A Way with the other contenders including Denim And Ruby, One And Only (Tokyo Yushun), Meisho Mambo, Fenomeno and Verxina. Verxina was the early leader before Epiphaneia took the lead 400 metres from the finish but Gentildonna made steady progress in the straight and made her bid for victory in the last 200 metres. She gained the advantage and held off several late challenges to win by three quarters of a length from the three-year-old colt To The World, with Gold Ship, Just A Way, Epiphaneia, Lachesis, and Last Impact close behind.

== Retirement ==
Gentildonna retired from racing on 28 December 2014. Her retirement ceremony was held at Nakayama Racecourse right after she had won the Arima Kinen, with over 40,000 fans attending the ceremony. She subsequently returned to Northern Farm to become a broodmare.

Gentildonna has produced seven foals in total. Her most notable progeny is Geraldina who won the Sankei Sho All Comers and Queen Elizabeth II Cup in 2022.

Gentildonna was retired from broodmare duty in July 2025, following a decline in her health over the year. Four months later, on 26 November, the Sunday Thoroughbred Club reported that Gentildonna had died the day earlier, at the age of 16.

=== Breeding record ===
c = colt, f = filly

No.	Name	Year	Sex	Color	Sire	Wins	Races	Remarks
1st	Moana Anela	2016	f	Dark Bay	King Kamehameha	3	20	Retired, broodmare
2nd	(Gentildonna 2017)	2017	c	Dark Bay	King Kamehameha			
3rd	Geraldina	2018	f	Bay	Maurice	6	23	Retired, broodmare
4th	Marina Donna	2019	f	Bay	Lord Kanaloa	0	5	Retired, broodmare
	(not foaled)	2020			Lord Kanaloa			
5th	Evangelina	2021	f	Bay	Maurice	0	1	Deceased
	(not foaled)	2022			Epiphaneia			
6th	Argentera	2023	f	Bay	Drefong	0	4	Retired, broodmare
7th	Asteria Donna	2024	f	Bay	Epiphaneia			Pre-debut
	(died while in pregnancy)				Saturnalia			

== Awards and assessment ==
In the polling for the 2012 JRA Award Gentildonna was elected Japanese Horse of the Year, taking 256 of the 289 votes beating Gold Ship (21 votes), Orfevre (11 votes) and the sprinter Lord Kanaloa (1 vote). She was also the unanimous choice for the JRA Award for Best Three-Year-Old Filly.

In January 2014, Gentildonna won the JRA Award for Best Older Filly or Mare, taking 274 of the 280 votes.

Gentildonna won the Japanese Horse of the Year award again in January 2015 by 231 votes to 51 from Just A Way. She added a second Best Older Filly or Mare title, being the unanimous choice of the 285 electors. She is the only horse to have won the Japanese Horse of the Year award over non-sequential years. On 12 September 2016, Gentildonna was inducted in the Japan Racing Association Hall of Fame.

== Legacy ==
A statue of Gentildonna was permanently installed at Kyoto Racecourse in 2013.

== In popular culture ==
An anthropomorphized version of Gentildonna appears as a character in the Japanese multimedia franchise Umamusume: Pretty Derby, voiced by Yū Serizawa. She is depicted as the daughter of a wealthy family who holds meritocratic views and welcomes challengers that she deems worthy. She has fierce rivalries with Orfevre and Verxina, yet views them as respectable opponents. She is also disproportionately physically strong compared to her peers, with her strength allowing her to perform feats including effortlessly compressing metal balls into tiny beads, lifting several heavy crates at once, and cracking a walnut with only a toe.

== Race record ==
Date	Age	Race	Class	Distance	Racecourse	Track	Finish	Entry	Time	Jockey	Winner (2nd Place)
19 Nov 2011	2	Two Year Old		1600m	Kyoto	Turf	2nd	17	1:41.0	Mirco Demuro	A Shin Full Mark
10 Dec 2011	2	Two Year Old		1600m	Hanshin	Turf	1st	18	1:36.7	Ioritz Mendizabal	(Yamanin Cavalier)
8 Jan 2012	3	Shinzan Kinen	G3	1600m	Kyoto	Turf	1st	15	1:34.3	Christophe Lemaire	(Meiner Attract)
3 Mar 2012	3	Tulip Sho	G3	1600m	Hanshin	Turf	4th	14	1:36.1	Yasunari Iwata	Hana's Goal
8 Apr 2012	3	Oka Sho	G1	1600m	Hanshin	Turf	1st	18	1:34.6	Yasunari Iwata	(Verxina)
20 May 2012	3	Japanese Oaks	G1	2400m	Tokyo	Turf	1st	18	2:23.6	Yuga Kawada	(Verxina)
16 Sep 2012	3	Rose Stakes	G2	1800m	Hanshin	Turf	1st	10	1:46.8	Yasunari Iwata	(Verxina)
14 Oct 2012	3	Shuka Sho	G1	2000m	Kyoto	Turf	1st	18	2:00.4	Yasunari Iwata	(Verxina)
25 Nov 2012	3	Japan Cup	G1	2400m	Tokyo	Turf	1st	17	2:23.1	Yasunari Iwata	(Orfevre)
30 Mar 2013	4	Dubai Sheema Classic	G1	2410m	Meydan	Turf	2nd	11	2:27.7	Yasunari Iwata	St. Nicholas Abbey
23 Jun 2013	4	Takarazuka Kinen	G1	2200m	Hanshin	Turf	3rd	11	2:13.8	Yasunari Iwata	Gold Ship
27 Oct 2013	4	Tenno Sho (Autumn)	G1	2000m	Tokyo	Turf	2nd	17	1:58.2	Yasunari Iwata	Just A Way
24 Nov 2013	4	Japan Cup	G1	2400m	Tokyo	Turf	1st	17	2:26.1	Ryan Moore	(Denim and Ruby)
16 Feb 2014	5	Kyoto Kinen	G2	2200m	Kyoto	Turf	6th	12	2:16.5	Yuichi Fukunaga	Desperado
29 Mar 2014	5	Dubai Sheema Classic	G1	2410m	Meydan	Turf	1st	14	2:27.3	Ryan Moore	(Cirrus des Aigles)
29 Jun 2014	5	Takarazuka Kinen	G1	2200m	Hanshin	Turf	9th	12	2:15.1	Yuga Kawada	Gold Ship
2 Nov 2014	5	Tenno Sho (Autumn)	G1	2000m	Tokyo	Turf	2nd	18	1:59.8	Keita Tosaki	Spielberg
30 Nov 2014	5	Japan Cup	G1	2400m	Tokyo	Turf	4th	18	2:24.0	Ryan Moore	Epiphaneia
28 Dec 2014	5	Arima Kinen	G1	2500m	Nakayama	Turf	1st	16	2:35.3	Keita Tosaki	(To the World)

== Pedigree ==
Pedigree of Gentildonna (JPN), bay mare, 2009
Sire Deep Impact (JPN) 2002	Sunday Silence (USA); 1986	Halo	Hail to Reason
Sire Deep Impact (JPN) 2002	Sunday Silence (USA); 1986	Halo	Cosmah
Sire Deep Impact (JPN) 2002	Sunday Silence (USA); 1986	Wishing Well	Understanding
Sire Deep Impact (JPN) 2002	Sunday Silence (USA); 1986	Wishing Well	Mountain Flower
Sire Deep Impact (JPN) 2002	Wind in Her Hair (IRE); 1991	Alzao	Lyphard
Sire Deep Impact (JPN) 2002	Wind in Her Hair (IRE); 1991	Alzao	Lady Rebecca
Sire Deep Impact (JPN) 2002	Wind in Her Hair (IRE); 1991	Burghclere	Busted
Sire Deep Impact (JPN) 2002	Wind in Her Hair (IRE); 1991	Burghclere	Highclere
Dam Donna Blini (GB) 2003	Bertolini (USA); 1996	Danzig	Northern Dancer
Dam Donna Blini (GB) 2003	Bertolini (USA); 1996	Danzig	Pas de Nom
Dam Donna Blini (GB) 2003	Bertolini (USA); 1996	Aquilegia	Alydar
Dam Donna Blini (GB) 2003	Bertolini (USA); 1996	Aquilegia	Courtly Dee
Dam Donna Blini (GB) 2003	Cal Norma's Lady (IRE); 1988	Lyphard's Special	Lyphard
Dam Donna Blini (GB) 2003	Cal Norma's Lady (IRE); 1988	Lyphard's Special	My Bupers
Dam Donna Blini (GB) 2003	Cal Norma's Lady (IRE); 1988	June Darling	Junius
Dam Donna Blini (GB) 2003	Cal Norma's Lady (IRE); 1988	June Darling	Beau Darling (Family: 16-f)
