= Masayoshi Ebina =

Japanese horse trainer and former jockey

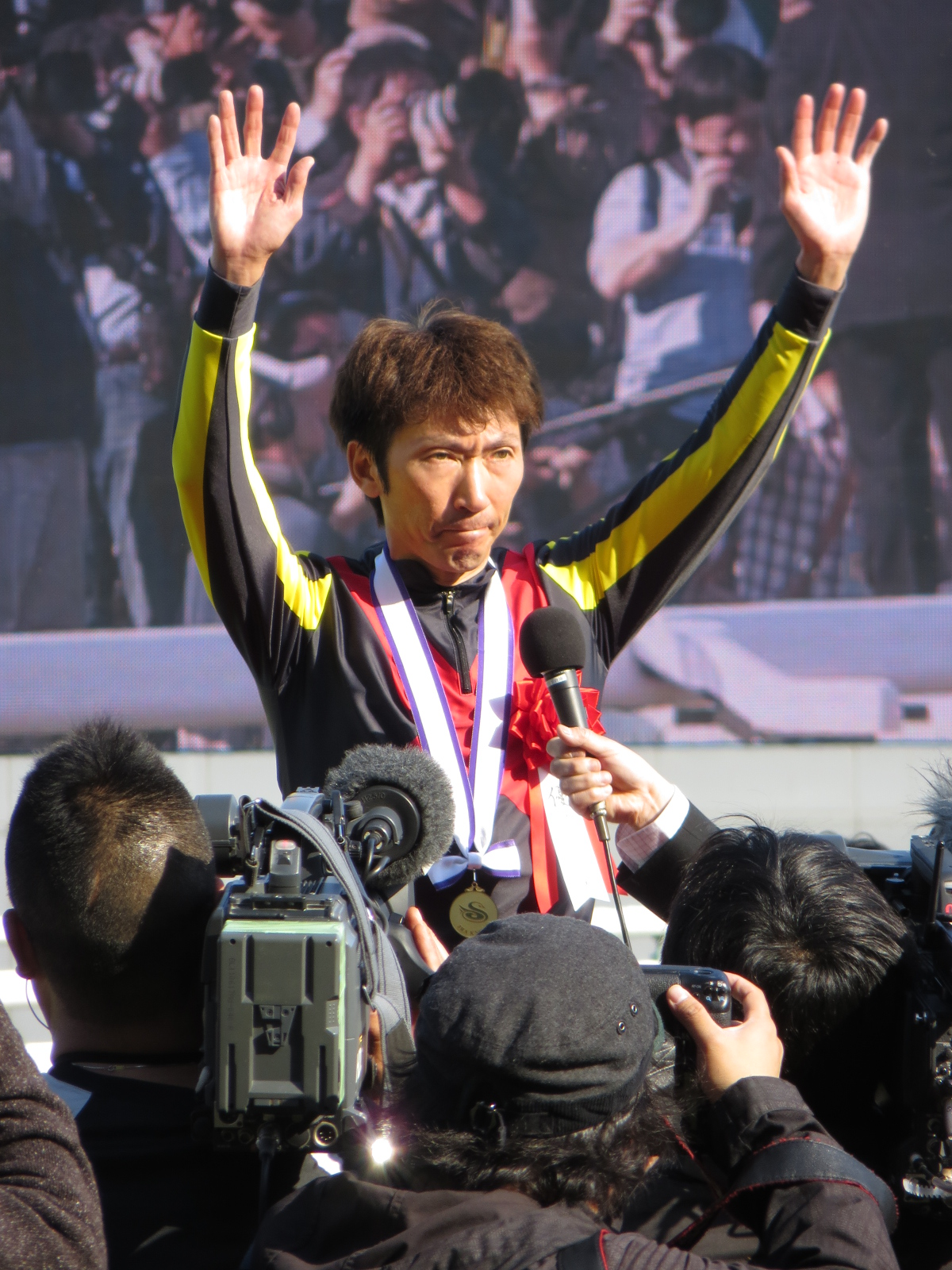
- Masayoshi Ebina (Apr 28, 2013)

Personal information
- Nationality: Japanese
- Born: March 19, 1969 (age 57) Shiroishi-ku, Sapporo, Hokkaido
- Occupations: Horse trainer Jockey (former)
- Height: 162 cm (5 ft 4 in)
- Weight: 51 kg (112 lb)

Horse racing career
- Sport: Horse racing
- Career wins: 2,598

Major racing wins
- Grand Prix de Saint-Cloud (1999); Japan Cup (1998); Arima Kinen (2001, 2007); Tenno Sho (1996, 2002); Hong Kong Cup (1995)

Racing awards
- JRA champion jockey (2001); Minpou kisha club shō (1987)

Honours
- Japan Racing Association Hall of Fame (2026)

Significant horses
- Air Jihad, Apapane, Bubble Gum Fellow, Danon Platina, Dee Majesty, El Condor Pasa, Fenomeno, Isla Bonita, Manhattan Cafe, Marialite, Matsurida Gogh, Shonan Adela

Masayoshi Ebina (蛯名 正義, Ebina Masayoshi) (born March 19, 1969, in Hokkaidō, Japan) is a Japanese horse trainer and former jockey. He has also been nicknamed Ebi-Shō.

He decided to become a jockey after watching Green Grass win the Kikuka Sho.

He is best known for riding El Condor Pasa, winning the Japan Cup in 1998 and taking second place in the 1999 Prix de l'Arc de Triomphe.

In 2010 he won the Japanese Fillies' Triple Crown with Apapane.

He retired as a jockey in February 2021 after earning his license as a horse trainer. He inherited 33 horses from Kazuo Fujisawa in 2022, as he was retiring from horse training. In 2026, he was selected as the eighth jockey to be inducted into Japan Racing Association Hall of Fame and the first to do so since 2014.

== Major wins ==
France

- Grand Prix de Saint-Cloud - (1) - El Condor Pasa (1999)

Hong Kong

- Hong Kong Cup - (1) - Fujiyama Kenzan (1995)

Japan

- Arima Kinen - (2) - Manhattan Cafe (2001), Matsurida Gogh (2007)
- Asahi Hai Futurity Stakes - (2) - Dream Journey (2006), Danon Platina (2014)
- Hanshin Juvenile Fillies - (2) - Apapane (2009), Shonan Adela (2014)
- Japan Breeding farm's Cup Sprint - (1) - Nobo Jack (2001)
- Japan Cup - (1) - El Condor Pasa (1998)
- Kikuka Shō - (1) - Manhattan Cafe (2001)
- Mile Championship - (2) - Air Jihad (1999), Tokai Point (2002)
- Oka Sho - (1) - Apapane (2010)
- Queen Elizabeth II Commemorative Cup - (1) - Marialite (2015)
- Satsuki Sho - (2) - Isla Bonita (2014), Dee Majesty (2016)
- Shuka Sho - (1) - Apapane (2010)
- Sprinters Stakes - (1) - Trot Star (2001)
- Takamatsunomiya Kinen - (1) - Trot Star (2001)
- Takarazuka Kinen - (1) - Marialite (2016)
- Teio sho - (1) - Fast Friend (2000)
- Tenno Sho (Autumn) - (1) - Bubble Gum Fellow (1996)
- Tenno Sho (Spring) -(3) - Manhattan Cafe (2002), Fenomeno (2013 & 2014)
- Tokyo Daishoten - (1) - Fast Friend (2000)
- Victoria Mile - (1) - Apapane (2011)
- Yasuda Kinen - (1) - Air Jihad (1999)
- Yushun Himba - (2) - Umeno Fiber (1999), Apapane (2010)
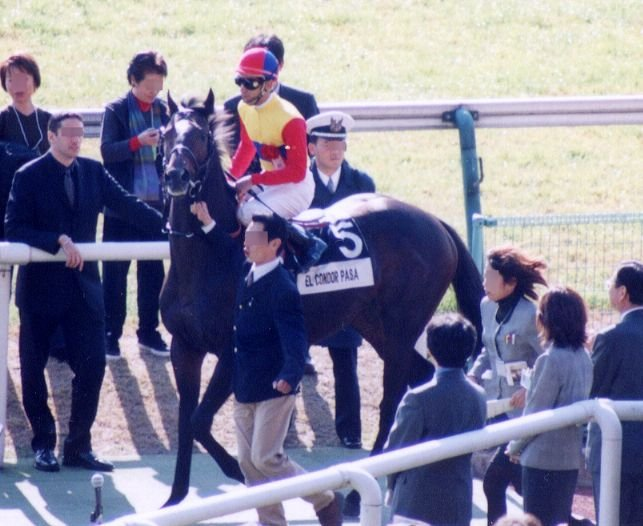
Masayoshi Ebina and El Condor Pasa (November 28, 1999)

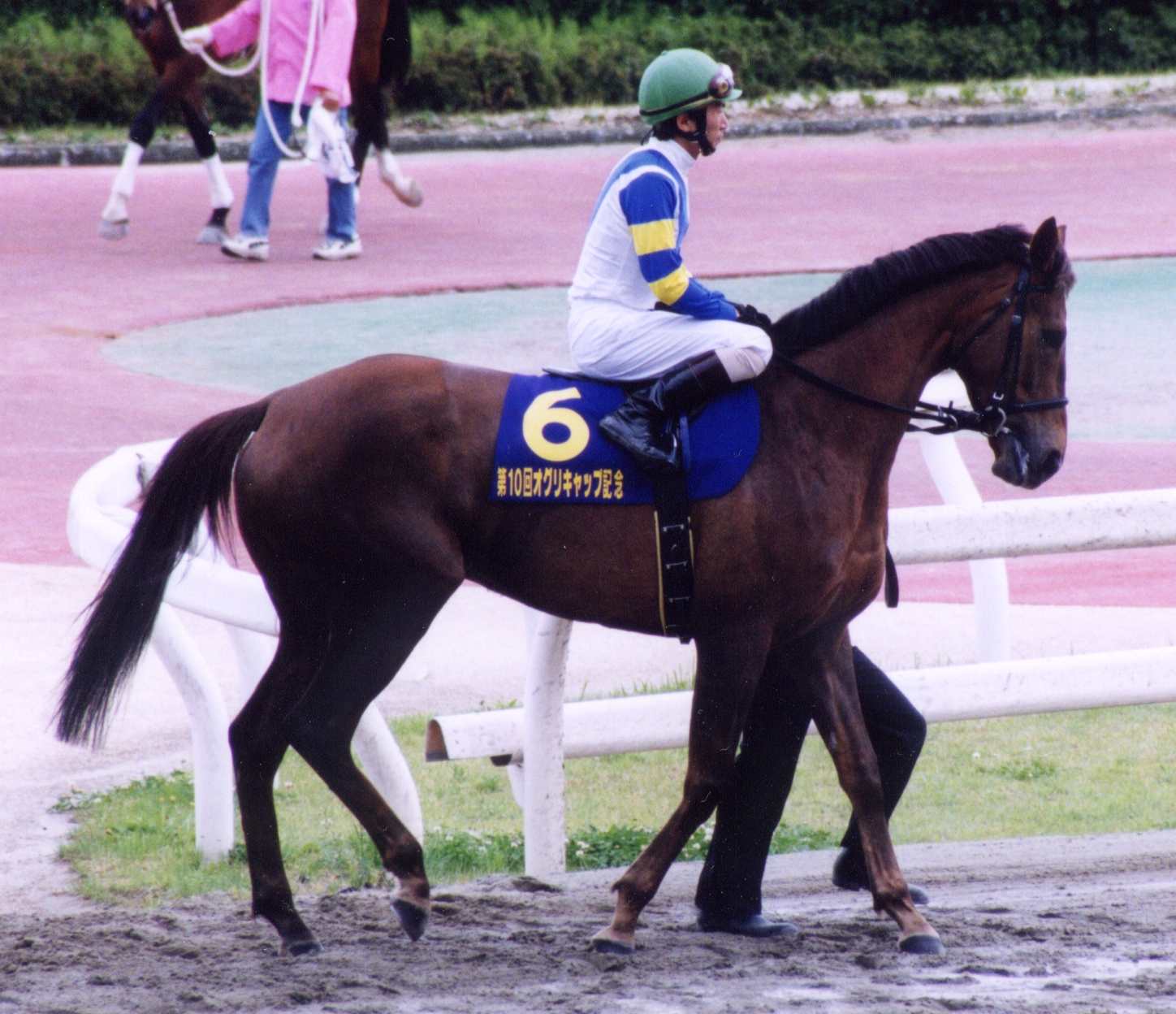
Masayoshi Ebina and Fast Friend (Apr 30, 2001)

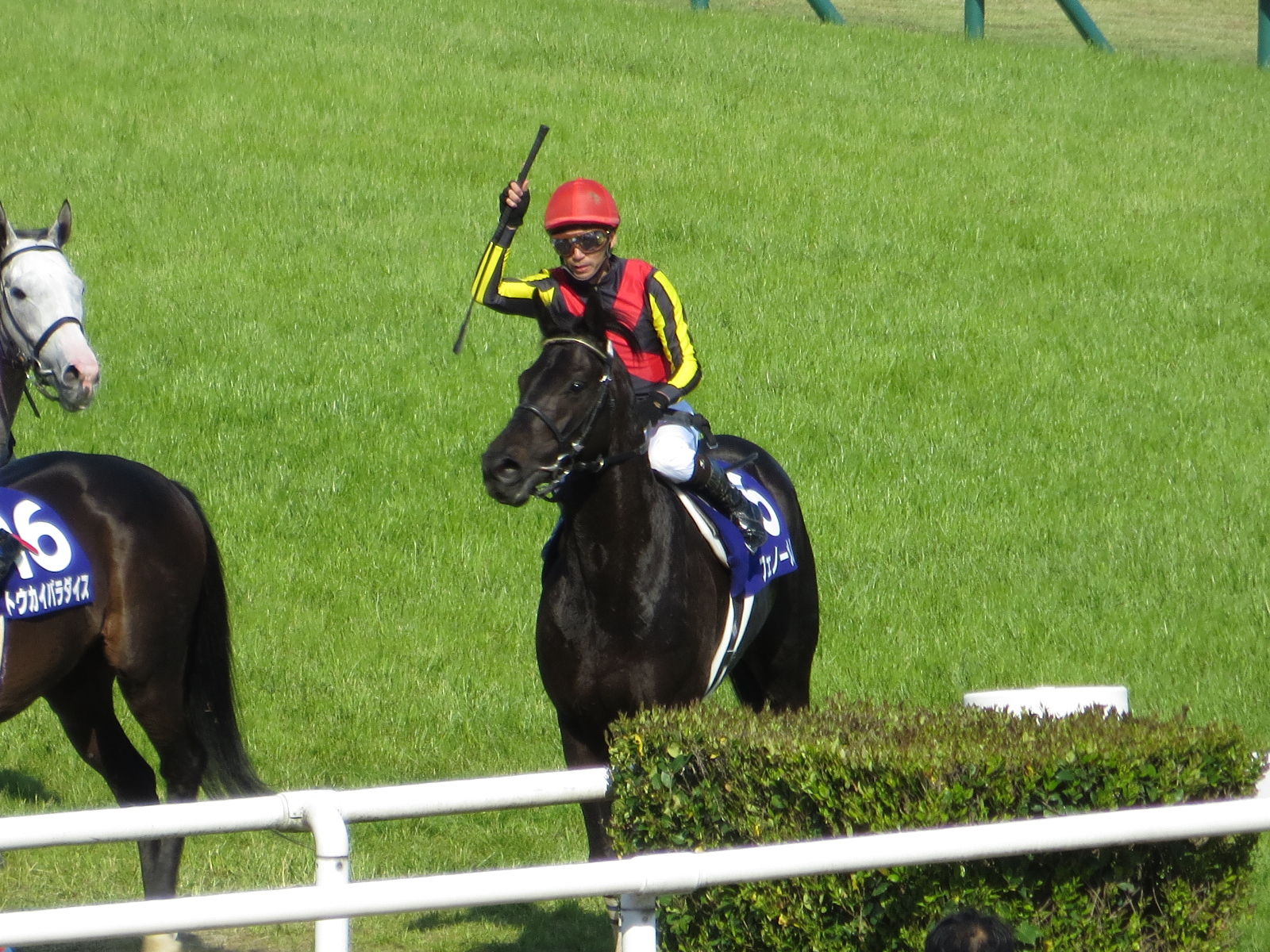
Masayoshi Ebina and Fenomeno (Apr 28, 2013)
