= Marialite (horse) =

Japanese-bred Thoroughbred racehorse

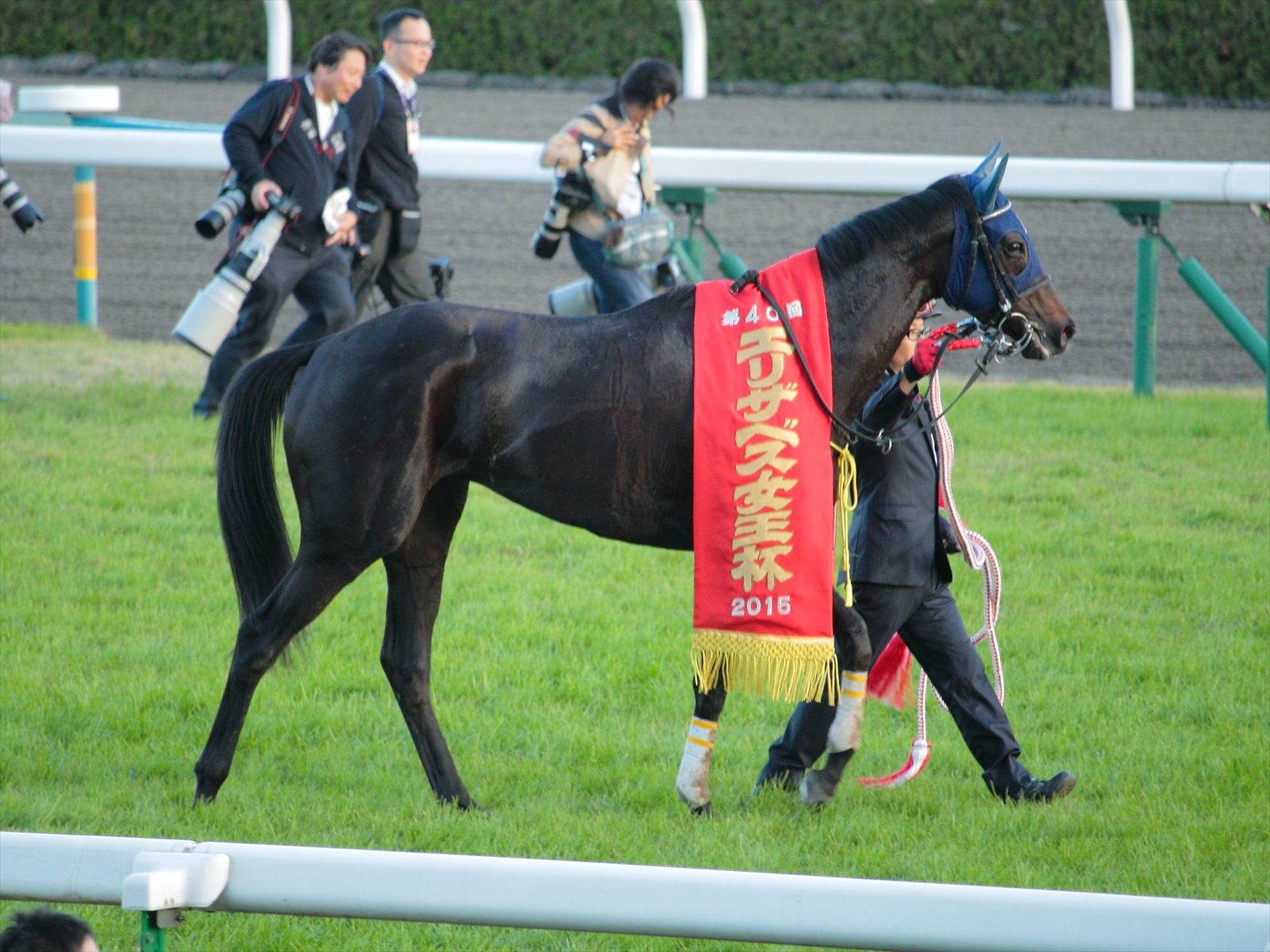
- Marialite in 2015
- Sire: Deep Impact
- Grandsire: Sunday Silence
- Dam: Chrysoprase
- Damsire: El Condor Pasa
- Sex: Mare
- Foaled: 19 February 2011
- Country: Japan
- Colour: Brown
- Breeder: Northern Farm
- Owner: U Carrot Farm
- Racing colours
- Trainer: Takashi Kubota
- Jockey: Masayoshi Ebina
- Record: 20: 6-2-5
- Earnings: 413,958,000 JPY

Major wins
- Queen Elizabeth II Cup (2015); Takarazuka Kinen (2016)

Awards
- JRA Award for Best Older Filly or Mare (2016)

Marialite (Japanese マリアライト, foaled 19 February 2011) is a Japanese retired Thoroughbred racehorse and broodmare. She was slow to mature and did not race until she was three years old when she won two minor races. She finally emerged as a top class performer in 2015 when she won the Grade 1 Queen Elizabeth II Cup. In the following year she recorded her biggest victory when she defeated male opposition to take the Takarazuka Kinen and received the JRA Award for Best Older Filly or Mare.

== Background ==
Marialite is a brown mare bred in Japan by Northern Farm. During her racing career she was trained by Takashi Kubota and raced in the green, white and red colours of the Northern Farm affiliate U Carrot Farm. She was ridden in most of her races by Masayoshi Ebina.

She is from the fourth crop of foals sired by Deep Impact, who was the Japanese Horse of the Year in 2005 and 2006, winning races including the Tokyo Yushun, Tenno Sho, Arima Kinen and Japan Cup. Deep Impact's other progeny include Gentildonna, Harp Star, Kizuna, A Shin Hikari and Makahiki. Marialite's dam Chrysoprase showed some racing ability, winning three times from 23 starts in Japan between 2004 and 2007, and has also produced the Grade 2 winner Lia Fail and the Japan Dirt Derby winners Chrysolite and Chrysoberyl. She was a granddaughter of the Irish Oaks winner Regal Exception.

== Racing career ==
=== 2014: three-year-old season ===
Marialite made her racecourse debut on 11 January 2014 in a contest for previously unraced three-year-olds over 2000 metres at Nakayama Racecourse and won from Remove Again and fourteen others. She then finished third in a minor race at the same track in March and sixth in the Listed Sweetpea Stakes at Tokyo Racecourse in May. On 29 June at Tokyo she won a minor event over 1800 metres and then finished third over the same distance at Niigata Racecourse in August. After the summer break she returned for two races at Tokyo, finishing third over 1800 metres in October and fifth over 2000 metres in November.

=== 2015: four-year-old season ===
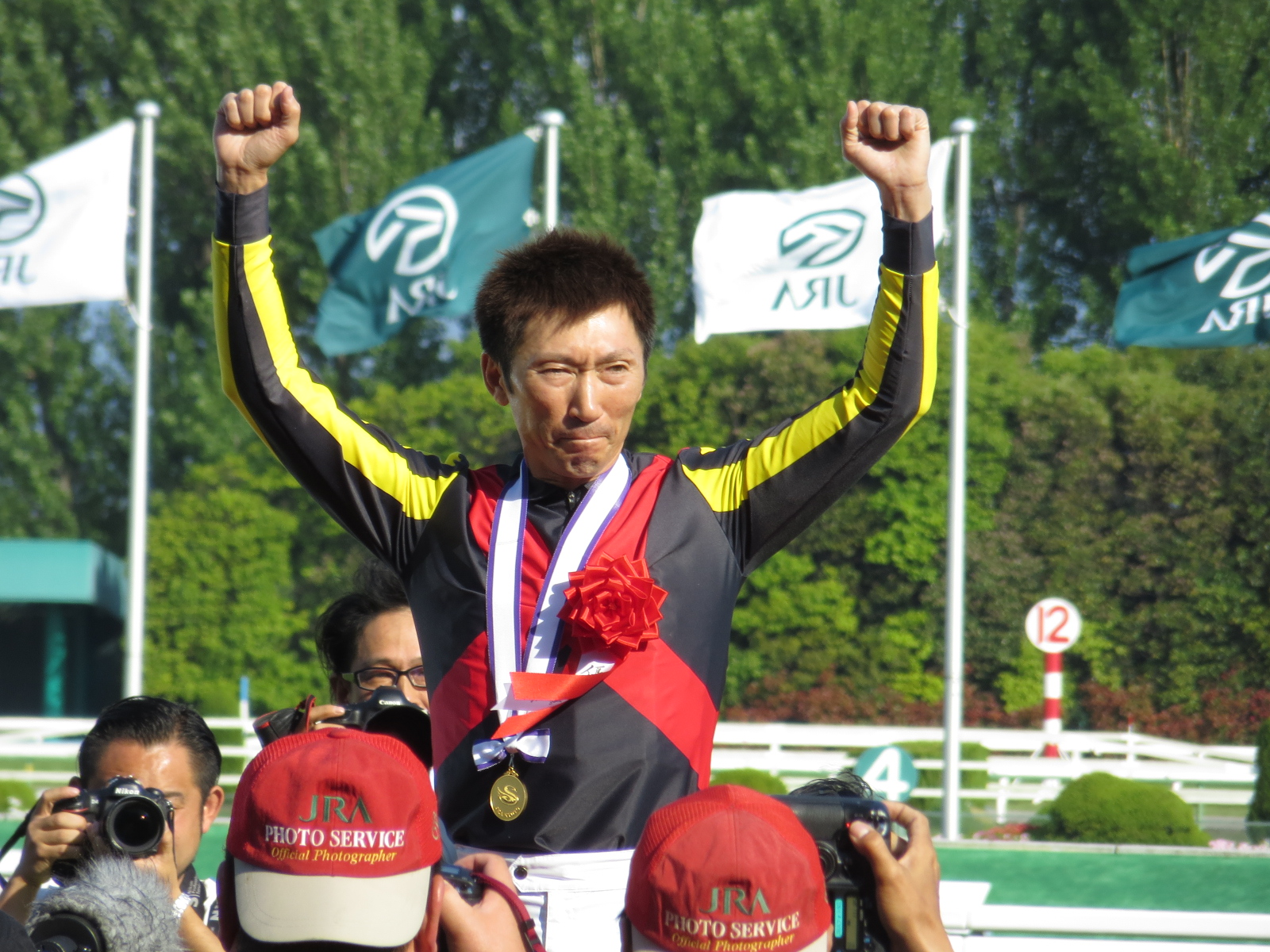
Masayoshi Ebina, who rode Marialite to her biggest wins

Marialite began her 2015 campaign by finishing third in a minor race at Tokyo in February and was then moved up in distance to win a race over 2500 metres at Nakayama in March. In May she won again, taking the ungraded Ryokufu Stakes over 2400 metres at Tokyo. She was then stepped up into Grade 3 class for the Mermaid Stakes at Hanshin Racecourse on 14 June in which she started the 2.5/1 favourite and finished second of the sixteen runners, beaten three quarters of a lengths Chateau Blanche.

After a three and a half month summer break, the filly returned in the Grade 2 Sankei Sho All Comers at Nakayama on 27 September and finished fifth of the fifteen runners behind Shonan Pandora. On 15 November at Kyoto Racecourse the filly ran for the first time in Grade 1 class when she started a 14.2/1 outsider for the Queen Elizabeth II Cup. The Yushun Himba winner Nuovo Record started favourite, while the best-fancied of the other runners were the previous year's winner Lachesis and the three-year-old Rouge Buck (also owned by U Carrot Farm). After racing in mid-division in the early stages, Marialite, racing in a blue hood, was switched to the outside by Ebina entering the straight and produced a strong run to take the lead 200 metres from the finish. She held off the late run of Nuovo Record to win by a neck, with Touching Speed a nose away in third place. Takashi Kubota who was winning his first Grade 1 after twelve years of training said "I’m so delighted with her achievement because I’ve been training her towards this goal all along and she’s built up into a great filly. I left all the tactics to Ebina and she ran such a smooth race, I was really excited watching her charging down the homestretch. She held on so well!"

On her final run of the year, Marialite was one sixteen horses invited to contest the Arima Kinen over 2500 metres 27 December at Nakayama. She trailed the field in the early stages but then produced a strong finish to take fourth place behind Gold Actor, Sounds of Earth and Kitasan Black. The unplaced horses included Lovely Day and Gold Ship.

=== 2016: five-year-old season ===
On 26 March Marialite began her third season in the Grade 2 Nikkei Sho at Nakayama and finished third behind Gold Actor and Sounds of Earth. In the Meguro Kinen Handicap at Tokyo two months later she started the 2/1 favourite but was beaten a neck by the four-year-old colt Cryptogram, to whom she was conceding four pounds in weight. On 26 June at Hanshin, Marialite started a 24.1/1 outsider in a seventeen-runner field for the Grade 1 Takarazuka Kinen over 2200 metres. Duramente started favourite ahead of Kitasan Black and Lovely Day, while the other runners included Satono Crown, Toho Jackal (Kikuka Sho), One And Only (Tokyo Yushun) and Ambitious (Osaka Hai). Drawn on the outside of the field, the mare raced in mid-division, before beginning to make rapid progress in the straight. She overhauled the front-running Kitasan Black in the final strides and held off the late challenge of Duramente to win by a neck. Kitasan Black was a nose away in third ahead of Lovely Day. She became only the third female to win the race after Sweep Tosho in 2005 and Eight Crown in 1966. Masayoshi Ebina commented "She was in her best form of her spring campaign. Also, the somewhat soft going and the draw all worked well for her. She ran a perfect race. I think that the patience of the connection to wait for her to mature has led to this success".

In her autumn campaign, Marialite contested the same three races that she had in the previous year. After finishing fifth to Gold Actor in the All Comers on 25 September she attempted to repeat her 2016 success in the Queen Elizabeth II Cup. She started favourite but came home sixth of the fifteen runners behind Queens Ring. In her last race on 25 December she finished tenth of the sixteen runners in the Arima Kinen, six and three quarter lengths behind the winner Satono Diamond.

Her connections announced her retirement as of the end of the 2016 season. She was deregistered from racing on 15 January 2017, becoming a broodmare at Northern Farm after retirement.

== Racing form ==
Marialite won six races and struck podium seven more times out of 20 starts. This data is available based on JBIS and netkeiba.

Date	Track	Race	Grade	Distance (Condition)	Entry	HN	Odds (Favored)	Finish	Time	Margins	Jockey	Winner (Runner-up)
2014 – three-year-old season
Jan 11	Nakayama	3yo Newcomer		2,000 m (Firm)	16	3	5.7 (3)	1st	2:04.8	–0.4	Kosei Miura	(Remove Again)
Mar 2	Nakayama	3yo Allowance	1W	1,800 m (Good)	14	14	8.9 (5)	3rd	1:51.6	0.3	Kosei Miura	Meine Auram
May 4	Tokyo	Sweetpea Stakes	OP	1,800 m (Firm)	16	11	7.6 (3)	6th	1:47.8	0.5	Hideaki Miyuki	Shiny Girl
Jun 29	Tokyo	3yo+ Allowance	1W	1,800 m (Soft)	13	5	2.1 (1)	1st	1:48.9	–0.2	Masayoshi Ebina	(Flying Skip)
Aug 3	Niigata	Miomotegawa Tokubetsu	ALW (2W)	1,800 m (Firm)	15	7	4.3 (2)	3rd	1:46.6	0.0	Masayoshi Ebina	Flame Code
Oct 11	Tokyo	Yamanakako Tokubetsu	ALW (2W)	1,800 m (Firm)	14	6	3.2 (1)	3rd	1:46.8	1.1	Masayoshi Ebina	Sekisho
Nov 16	Tokyo	TVK Sho	ALW (2W)	2,000 m (Firm)	14	12	5.5 (3)	5th	2:00.8	0.2	Takuya Ono	Le Falchion
2015 – four-year-old season
Feb 14	Tokyo	4yo+ Allowance	2W	1,800 m (Firm)	16	5	4.4 (1)	3rd	1:47.3	0.2	Masayoshi Ebina	Red Olivia
Mar 8	Nakayama	Itako Tokubetsu	ALW (2W)	2,500 m (Good)	11	9	3.7 (2)	1st	2:39.6	–0.5	Masayoshi Ebina	(Diski Dance)
May 9	Tokyo	Ryokufu Stakes	ALW (3W)	2,400 m (Firm)	18	4	4.4 (2)	1st	2:25.4	–0.2	Masayoshi Ebina	(Samson's Pride)
Jun 14	Hanshin	Mermaid Stakes	3	2,000 m (Firm)	16	12	3.5 (1)	2nd	2:00.6	0.1	Masayoshi Ebina	Chateau Blanche
Sep 27	Nakayama	Sankei Sho All Comers	2	2,200 m (Firm)	15	14	11.1 (4)	5th	2:12.7	0.8	Masayoshi Ebina	Shonan Pandora
Nov 15	Kyoto	Queen Elizabeth II Cup	1	2,200 m (Good)	18	12	15.2 (6)	1st	2:14.9	0.0	Masayoshi Ebina	(Nuovo Record)
Dec 27	Nakayama	Arima Kinen	1	2,500 m (Firm)	16	16	41.5 (12)	4th	2:33.1	0.1	Masayoshi Ebina	Gold Actor
2016 – five-year-old season
Mar 26	Nakayama	Nikkei Sho	2	2,500 m (Firm)	9	2	6.6 (4)	3rd	2:37.1	0.3	Masayoshi Ebina	Gold Actor
May 29	Tokyo	Meguro Kinen	2	2,500 m (Firm)	18	6	3.0 (1)	2nd	2:30.6	0.0	Masayoshi Ebina	Cryptogram
Jun 26	Hanshin	Takarazuka Kinen	1	2,200 m (Good)	17	16	25.1 (8)	1st	2:12.8	0.0	Masayoshi Ebina	(Duramente)
Sep 25	Nakayama	Sankei Sho All Comers	2	2,200 m (Firm)	12	7	2.9 (2)	5th	2:12.2	0.3	Masayoshi Ebina	Gold Actor
Nov 13	Kyoto	Queen Elizabeth II Cup	1	2,200 m (Firm)	15	2	3.1 (1)	6th	2:13.5	0.6	Masayoshi Ebina	Queens Ring
Dec 15	Nakayama	Arima Kinen	1	2,500 m (Firm)	16	16	19.3 (6)	10th	2:33.6	1.0	Masayoshi Ebina	Satono Diamond

Legend:
Turf

== Assessment and awards ==
In the JRA Awards for 2015 Marialite finished third behind Shonan Pandora and Straight Girl in the voting for the JRA Award for Best Older Filly or Mare. She took the award in the following year, garnering 233 of the 291 votes.

== Pedigree ==
Pedigree of Marialite (JPN), brown mare 2011
Sire Deep Impact (JPN) 2002	Sunday Silence (USA); 1986	Halo	Hail to Reason
Sire Deep Impact (JPN) 2002	Sunday Silence (USA); 1986	Halo	Cosmah
Sire Deep Impact (JPN) 2002	Sunday Silence (USA); 1986	Wishing Well	Understanding
Sire Deep Impact (JPN) 2002	Sunday Silence (USA); 1986	Wishing Well	Mountain Flower
Sire Deep Impact (JPN) 2002	Wind in Her Hair (IRE); 1991	Alzao	Lyphard
Sire Deep Impact (JPN) 2002	Wind in Her Hair (IRE); 1991	Alzao	Lady Rebecca
Sire Deep Impact (JPN) 2002	Wind in Her Hair (IRE); 1991	Burghclere	Busted
Sire Deep Impact (JPN) 2002	Wind in Her Hair (IRE); 1991	Burghclere	Highclere
Dam Chrysoprase (JPN) 2002	El Condor Pasa (USA); 1995	Kingmambo	Mr Prospector
Dam Chrysoprase (JPN) 2002	El Condor Pasa (USA); 1995	Kingmambo	Miesque
Dam Chrysoprase (JPN) 2002	El Condor Pasa (USA); 1995	Saddler's Gal	Sadler's Wells
Dam Chrysoprase (JPN) 2002	El Condor Pasa (USA); 1995	Saddler's Gal	Glenveagh
Dam Chrysoprase (JPN) 2002	Catherine Parr (USA); 1987	Riverman	Never Bend
Dam Chrysoprase (JPN) 2002	Catherine Parr (USA); 1987	Riverman	River Lady
Dam Chrysoprase (JPN) 2002	Catherine Parr (USA); 1987	Regal Exception	Ribot
Dam Chrysoprase (JPN) 2002	Catherine Parr (USA); 1987	Regal Exception	Rajput Princess (Family: 16-a)
