= Nuovo Record =

Japanese-bred Thoroughbred racehorse (2011)

Nuovo Record; ヌーヴォレコルト
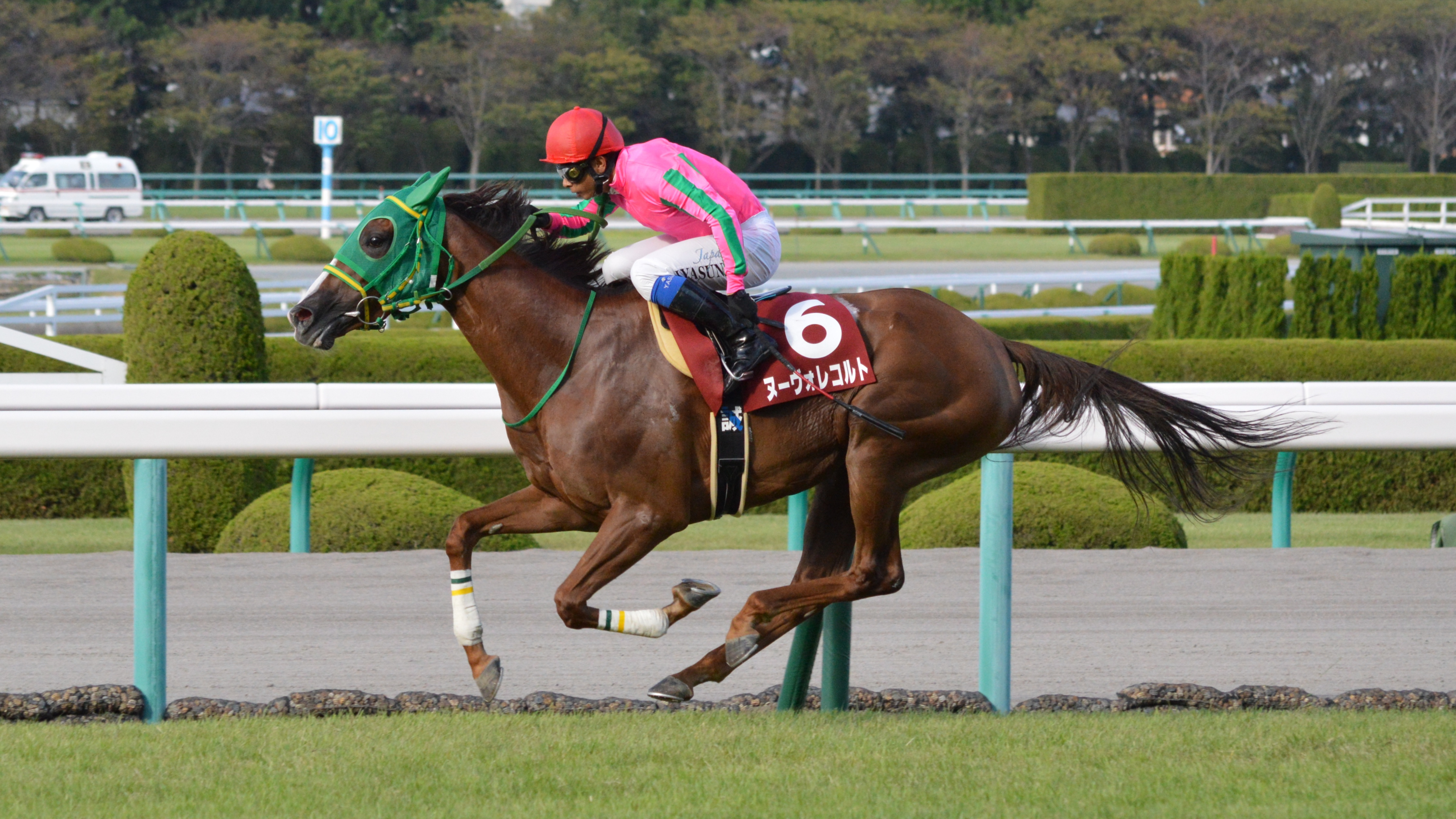
- Nuovo Record at the 2014 Rose Stakes
- Sire: Heart's Cry
- Grandsire: Sunday Silence
- Dam: Omega Spirit
- Damsire: Spinning World
- Sex: Mare
- Foaled: 25 February 2011
- Country: Japan
- Colour: Chestnut
- Breeder: Shadai Farm
- Owner: Reiko Hara
- Racing colours
- Trainer: Makoto Saito
- Jockey: Yasunari Iwata
- Record: 23: 6-6-1
- Earnings: ¥456,710,000

Major wins
- Rose Stakes (2014); Nakayama Kinen (2015); Red Carpet Handicap (2016); Japanese Classic Tiara Race wins: Yushun Himba (2014)
- Last updated on 8 September 2026

Nuovo Record (Japanese: ヌーヴォレコルト, Nūvu~orekoruto; foaled 25 February 2011) is a retired Japanese racehorse and an active broodmare. She was the winner of the 2014 Yushun Himba, beating Harp Star, who defeated her in the Oka Sho, by a neck. She also won a few more graded stakes such as the Rose Stakes and The Nakayama Kinen domestically. She was also a good overseas performer as she finished second behind A Shin Hikari in the 2015 Hong Kong Cup and also snatched a graded race win in the 2016 Red Carpet Handicap which held in Del Mar, America.

== Background ==
Nuovo Record was born on 25 February 2011 at the Shadai Farm in Chitose, Hokkaido. She was foaled out of Omega Spirit, a mare owned by Reiko Hara who won three races in 14 starts. She was sired by Heart's Cry, a horse that famously beat Deep Impact at the 2005 Arima Kinen and also won the Dubai Sheema Classic the next year after.

She was named after an Italian phrase meant New Record.

== Racing career ==
=== 2013: two-year-old season ===
She made her debut on 19 October in a 1600 metres turf race at Tokyo Racecourse. Jockeyed by Keita Tosaki, she raced mainly in the front position, but she failed to improve and finished in fourth place. Switching to Yuichi Fukunaga for the next race, she finally broke maiden in her second race as she won the race on the line by two and half lengths. At the end of the year, she participated in the Koyamaki Sho alongside Hayato Yoshida. Yoshida pulled her away from the pack in the final straight to get her second win by three-quarters of a length over Admire Bijin in second place. This win qualified her for a place in the open class through the classic year.

=== 2014: three-year-old season ===
She started her classic year with a race in the Tulip Sho at Hanshin Racecourse. In this race, she was ridden by her eventual main jockey, Yasunari Iwata, for the first time. She was running well on the day, but she was overtaken by Harp Star on the outside in the final stretch as she finished in second place, two and a half lengths behind. Iwata said after the race that she was an easy horse to ride, tenacious in the stretch, and that their plan worked out for the day. This top three placement earned the horse a priority berth for the first classic of the year, Oka Sho. In the Oka Sho, she raced on as the fifth favourite on the day. In the beginning of the race, Fukuno Dream took an early charge and leading the pack. As the pack compacted in the final stint, Red Reveur and Nuovo Record made a bid, but Harp Star once again swept from the outside at the last moment to win the race, while Nuovo Record finished third behind Red Reveur in second. Iwata said that he was regretted that he held back the pace too much whilst her trainer, Makoto Saito, thought that the horse might fare better in a longer race.

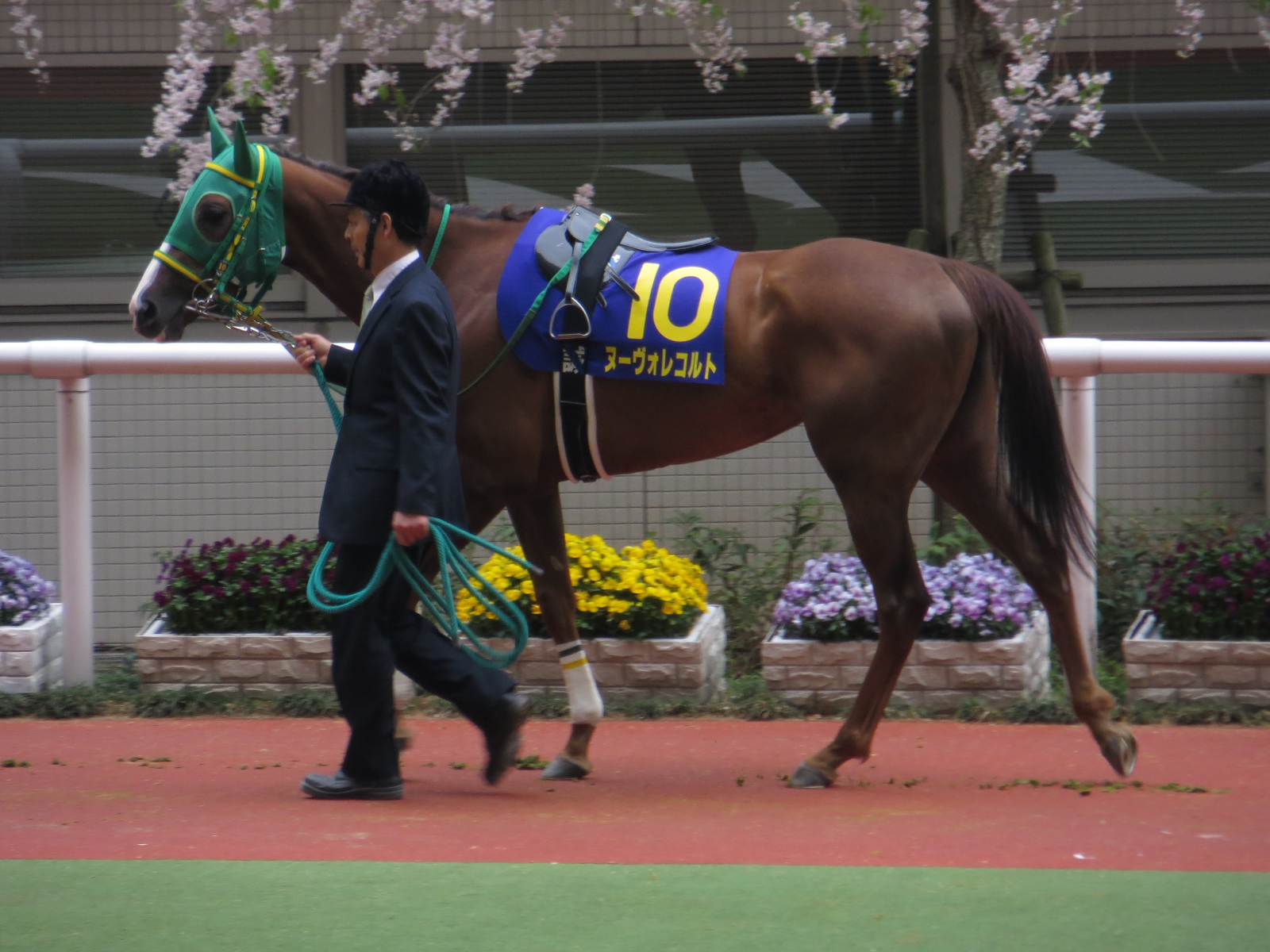
Nuovo Record at the 2014 Oka Sho paddock

Her jockey, Yasunari Iwata, holding onto the race cloth she used in the 2014 Yushun Himba

One month later, she would enter the second classic of the year, the Yushun Himba at Tokyo Racecourse. Harp Star was undeniably the first favourite for it whilst she lay behind as the second with 9.8 odds to one. As the gates opened, Peisha Felice led early in the Japanese Oaks, with Nuovo Record getting a ground-saving trip along the rail in midpack down the backstretch, whilst Harp Star stayed at the back of the 18-horse field. Nuovo Record rounded the final corner in eighth place, waited for a clear path in the straight, then sprinted ahead and took the lead with about 200 meters to go. Bounce Chasse and Harp Star made a late chase, but it was futile as Nuovo Record took the win by a neck over Harp Star at the line for her first GI win, as Bounce Chasse also finished third a neck back. Iwata who was delighted after the race said that the run was a complete victory and glad she held on the lead once she grabbed it. Iwata also made a plea to Saito to ride her again next time around, as she was sent to pasture to rest up for the autumn campaign.

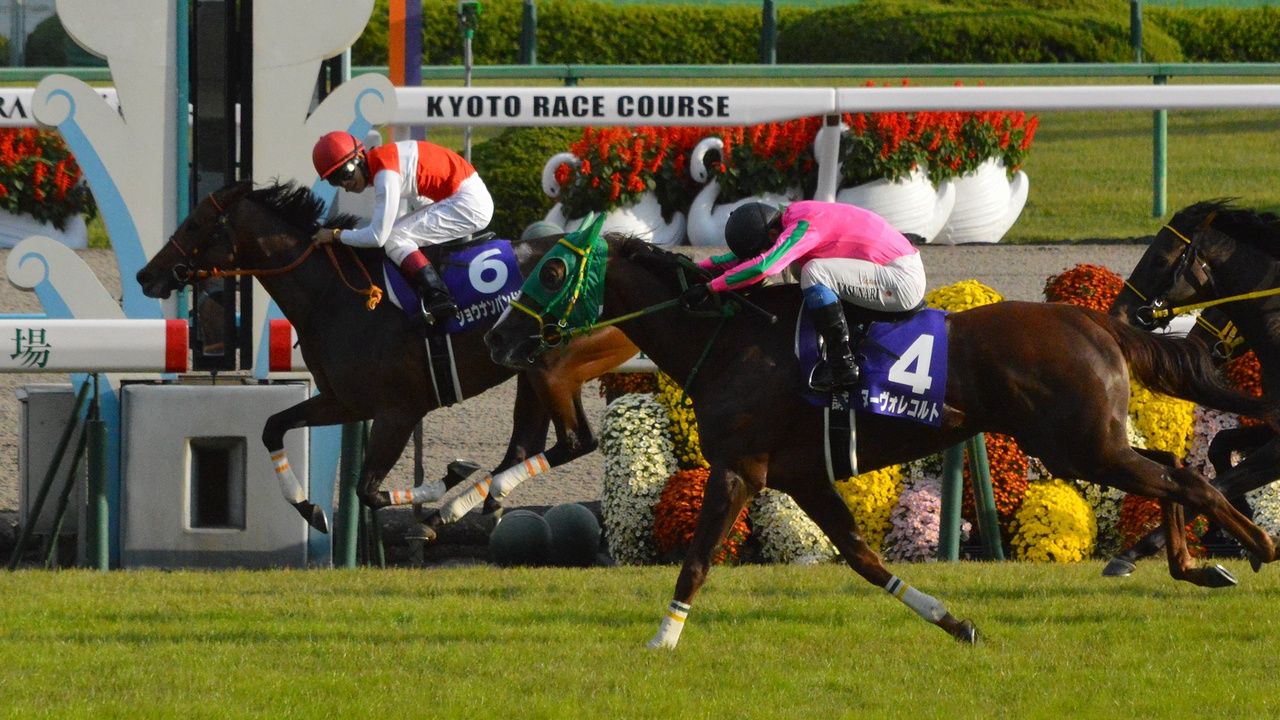
Shonan Pandora (number 6) beat Nuovo Record to the line at the 2014 Shuka Sho

She restart the season in the Rose Stakes at Hanshin as a preparation for the final leg of the classic, Shuka Sho. In the race, she nailed a good start and secured the front position. Iwata controlled and conserved her energy well before making a move in the final straight to win the race by one and a quarter length over the second place finisher, Tagano Etoile. To adept to the surroundings for the Shuka Sho, she entered Ritto Training Center for conditionings and trainings. She was picked as an overwhelming favourite for the race with 1.5 odds to one as Harp Star was not joining in due to her participation on the Prix de l'Arc de Triomphe in France. Early on, she and Shonan Pandora led the second group, with Peisha Felice once again taking an early mesmerising five-length lead. In the final stints, both horses caught her up and surpassed her for the final duel in the final straight. They crossed the line in a photo finish, which meant that Shonan Pandora just edged Nuovo Record for the win by a neck, as both horses finished in a similar record time. Iwata again praised on how easy the horse to ride on but disappointed that he could not make it count on the day. Instead of the Japan Cup, Saito sent her to the Queen Elizabeth II Cup to settle the score at the Kyoto Racecourse. On the day, Iwata rode her as the chaser before surged past everyone in the final straight. As they approached the finish line, Lachesis, ridden by Suguru Hamanaka, hunted them down in the homestretch and stole the win at the line by a neck as the previous year's winner, Meisho Mambo, crossed the line in third place.

Nuovo Record at the 2014 QEII Cup paddock before the race

Nuovo Record ridden by Yasunari Iwata before the race started

Nuovo Record and Lachesis (number 1) duel in the final straight at the race

=== 2015: four-year-old season ===
For the season opener, Saito decided to start her in the Nakayama Kinen on the first day of March. She was the only filly in the race as she race against the likes of previous two Satsuki Sho's winners, Isla Bonita and Logotype. Despite the tough field, Iwata drove her on the inside lane, overtook Logotype at the final stretch, and crossed the line first by a neck. Iwata said he just took a gamble on the inside lane and it paid off. She became the first filly to win this race in 24 years, since Yukino Sunrise did it back in 1991. Two months later, she would run in the Victoria Mile at Tokyo alongside Iwata once again. In the race, Iwata urged her to make a run after reaching the final straight, but she never responded to the call. She ended up in sixth place, which was the first time she finished outside the top five since her career began. She finished her spring campaign with an attempt in the Takarazuka Kinen. As the gates opened, she raced around the sixth position early on. She managed to accelerate briefly in the final phase but never made up any significant ground. She finished in fifth place behind the winner, Lovely Day, on the line. Despite the run not being optimal, Iwata said she was not slipping in normal form during the race and hoped they just could advanced better with the pace.

She rested for the summer and continued her career on the Sankei Sho All Comers at the end of September. Iwata would continue riding her for this race. During the race, she made a strong run on the inside lane and competed for the win near the end. Unfortunately, Shonan Pandora once again outbattled her at the line and finished first by one and a half lengths ahead of her in second place. Iwata said the horse was running well, but she had stress that halted her performance a bit in the end. The next race she joined would be her second attempt in the Queen Elizabeth II Cup in November. Saito expected the horse to run better this time around. She ran a bit differently this time as she stayed mostly at the back of the pack. Heading into the homestretch, she uncoiled an electric acceleration while still wide in the stretch and just missed catching Marialite, finishing second again following her runner-up finish last year. In December, she headed to her first oversea race in her career, the Hong Kong Cup which held in Sha Tin Racecourse, Hong Kong. This would be the first time since her debut year that she would be switching jockeys, as Ryan Moore took the task on the day. In the race, Nuovo Record ran calmly before making a move to the front group, but she was no match for the runaway A Shin Hikari as she finished in second place, completing a 1-2 finish for the Japanese contingent on the day. Moore spoke highly about the horse and felt that she was a bit underrated as he praised her excellent run. She returned to Japan and underwent quarantine two days later.

=== 2016: five-year-old season ===
For this year, she started her season at the Sankei Osaka Hai in April. Iwata, who recently moved from Ritto to Miho, would become her jockey once again. As a third favourite for the day, she waited in the leading group during the race and entered the straight with good momentum, but other horses in the congested pack blocked her way, and she was unable to advance as intended, finishing sixth behind Ambitious. Post race, Iwata kept it simple and just quoted, "we lost, that's it". She went to Hong Kong for the second time in April. This time it would be at the Queen Elizabeth II Cup alongside another new jockey, Yutaka Take. Unlike his previous front-running strategy, he positioned himself third from the rear in the race and, while maintaining a good pace, showed some acceleration in the final straight but fell just short of the leading group, finishing in sixth place. Take said the track conditions were non-ideal and noticed that she was lacking raw power despite having made good progress during the race. Saito sent the horse to rest and prepare for the second half as soon as she returned from Hong Kong.

She returned to racing at the Sapporo Kinen with another jockey, Hayato Yoshida, as Take was suspended from racing. The horse started well in the beginning but as Yoshida urged her to speed up, She did not gave a good respond as she finished in fourth place behind the winner, Neorealism who went wire-to-wire. Yoshida commented that it might be the track that affected her condition but hoped she would improve from that result. In November, she would join the Breeders' Cup Filly & Mare Turf with Take once again on her saddle. On the day, she raced mainly in the middle of the pack on the outer track. At the straight, she did not accelerate further, fell back in the order, and finished in eleventh place, seven and a half lengths behind. Saito and Take after the race were in agreement of saying that the horse could not kept up with the pace in the final straight despite having a good start. Saito tried her once again in another race in America, which was the Red Carpet Handicap, a GIII race at the Del Mar Racetrack. This time, he bring back her main jockey, Iwata to ride her on this race as she would be started from gate 1. When the gates opened, Nuovo Record hugged the rails and saved ground throughout the race. Arles picked up the pace before the final turn, in which Nuovo Record matched that move excellently. Midway in the final straight, Iwata brought Nuovo Record outside of Arles and urged the mare for the final push for the lead. In a close photo finish, Nuovo Record had edged Arles by a nose, followed by Swear by It one length behind the top two runners. Saito said that the only difference between the previous race and this one was that they could save her energy this time, and Iwata said the riding for this race was ideal. This win ended up as a great preparation for her another attempt at Hong Kong. This time it would be the Hong Kong Vase as she stuck with Iwata as her jockey and drawn on the outer gate 13. The race turned out pretty hectic for the horse as she was hustling alongside Quechua and One Foot in Heaven until the final 300 metres, when she finally secured clear running out of the traffic. On the line, she finished in fourth place behind the winner who was also a Japanese trained horse, Satono Crown.

=== 2017: six-year-old season ===
Saito continued her campaign this time back at the Nakayama Kinen in February, a race she won back in 2015. In this occasion, it did not turned out well for the horse as she lost stamina in the third and fourth corner, dropped from the lead and finishing in seventh on the line behind Neorealism. She would race once again at the Kinko Sho in March but failed to make a good impression as she finished in tenth place. Right after this race, it was announced that Nuovo Record would retire from racing and her name would be deregistered from the official racing registration.

== Racing form ==
Nuovo Record won six races, placed second six times, and third one time out of 23 starts. This data is based on JBIS, netkeiba, HKJC, and racingpost.

Date	Track	Race	Grade	Distance (Condition)	Entry	HN	Odds (Favored)	Finish	Time	Margins	Jockey	Winner (Runner-up)
2013 – two-year-old season
Oct 19	Tokyo	2yo Newcomer		1,600 m (Firm)	18	10	2.5 (1)	4th	1:36.8	0.3	Keita Tosaki	Sweet Garden
Nov 9	Tokyo	2yo Maiden		1,600 m (Firm)	11	11	2.0 (1)	1st	1:37.0	–0.4	Yuichi Fukunaga	(Musee Miranda)
Dec 8	Chukyo	Koyamaki Sho (ALW)	1W	1,600 m (Firm)	10	7	4.3 (2)	1st	1:36.5	–0.1	Hayato Yoshida	(Admire Bijin)
2014 – three-year-old season
Mar 8	Hanshin	Tulip Sho	GIII	1,600 m (Firm)	13	13	18.1 (4)	2nd	1:34.7	0.4	Yasunari Iwata	Harp Star
Apr 13	Hanshin	Oka Sho	GI	1,600 m (Firm)	18	10	30.9 (5)	3rd	1:33.4	0.1	Yasunari Iwata	Harp Star
May 25	Tokyo	Yushun Himba	GI	2,400 m (Firm)	18	9	9.8 (2)	1st	2:25.8	0.0	Yasunari Iwata	(Harp Star)
Sep 21	Hanshin	Rose Stakes	GII	1,800 m (Firm)	17	6	2.5 (2)	1st	1:46.0	–0.2	Yasunari Iwata	(Tagano Etoile)
Oct 19	Kyoto	Shuka Sho	GI	2,000 m (Firm)	17	4	1.5 (1)	2nd	1:57.0	0.0	Yasunari Iwata	Shonan Pandora
Nov 16	Kyoto	QEII Cup	GI	2,200 m (Firm)	18	5	3.3 (1)	2nd	2:12.3	0.0	Yasunari Iwata	Lachesis
2015 – four-year-old season
Mar 1	Nakayama	Nakayama Kinen	GII	1,800 m (Good)	11	4	4.7 (3)	1st	1:50.3	0.0	Yasunari Iwata	(Logotype)
May 17	Tokyo	Victoria Mile	GI	1,600 m (Firm)	18	15	2.2 (1)	6th	1:32.5	0.6	Yasunari Iwata	Straight Girl
Jun 28	Hanshin	Takarazuka Kinen	GI	2,200 m (Firm)	16	11	9.1 (3)	5th	2:14.7	0.3	Yasunari Iwata	Lovely Day
Sep 27	Nakayama	Sankei Sho All Comers	GII	2,200 m (Firm)	15	4	2.8 (1)	2nd	2:12.1	0.2	Yasunari Iwata	Shonan Pandora
Nov 15	Kyoto	QEII Cup	GI	2,200 m (Good)	18	18	3.0 (1)	2nd	2:14.9	0.0	Yasunari Iwata	Marialite
Dec 13	Sha Tin	Hong Kong Cup	GI	2,000 m (Good)	13	14	9.4 (6)	2nd	2:00.8	0.2	Ryan Moore	A Shin Hikari
2016 – five-year-old season
Apr 3	Hanshin	Sankei Osaka Hai	GII	2,000 m (Firm)	11	3	5.1 (3)	6th	2:00.0	0.7	Yasunari Iwata	Ambitious
Apr 24	Sha Tin	QE II Cup (HK)	GI	2,000 m (Yielding)	13	12	12.0 (6)	6th	2:02.5	1.2	Yutaka Take	Werther
Aug 21	Sapporo	Sapporo Kinen	GII	2,000 m (Good)	16	1	5.7 (2)	4th	2:02.3	0.6	Hayato Yoshida	Neorealism
Nov 5	Santa Anita	Breeders' Cup Filly & Mare Turf	GI	1 1/4 miles (Firm)	13	13	12/1 (3)	11th	1:59.3	1.5	Yutaka Take	Queen's Trust
Nov 24	Del Mar	Red Carpet Handicap	GIII	1 3/8 miles (Firm)	10	1	26/5 (3)	1st	2:15.6	0.0	Yasunari Iwata	(Arles)
Dec 11	Sha Tin	Hong Kong Vase	GI	2,400 m (Firm)	14	13	9.6 (2)	4th	2:27.5	1.3	Yasunari Iwata	Satono Crown
2017 – six-year-old season
Feb 26	Nakayama	Nakayama Kinen	GII	1,800 m (Firm)	11	10	13.8 (6)	7th	1:48.1	0.5	Yasunari Iwata	Neorealism
Mar 11	Chukyo	Kinko Sho	GII	2,000 m (Firm)	16	13	18.4 (6)	10th	1:59.7	0.5	Yasunari Iwata	Yamakatsu Ace

Legend:
Turf

== Broodmare career ==
She became a broodmare at the farm she was born, the Shadai Farm. She produced eight foals so far:

- Donna Sereno, bay filly, 2018, by Lord Kanaloa, 3 wins in 17 starts, broodmare.
- Curcuma, chestnut filly, 2019, by Frankel, 0 wins in 2 starts, broodmare.
- England Eyes, bay filly, 2020, by Kingman, 4 wins in 18 starts, won the 2025 Kokura Kinen, broodmare.
- Omega Imperial, bay colt, 2021, by Kingman, 2 wins in 14 starts, active.
- Sena Style, chestnut filly, 2022, by Sottsass, 2 wins in 6 starts, active.
- Trinity, dark bay filly, 2023, by Saturnalia, 2 wins in 4 starts, active.
- Unnamed chestnut filly, 2024, by Bricks and Mortar, unraced.
- Unnamed Bay Colt, 2025, by Nadal, unraced.

== Pedigree ==
Pedigree of Nuovo Record (JPN), Chestnut, 2011
Sire Heart's Cry (JPN) 2001	Sunday Silence (USA); 1986	Halo	Hail to Reason
Sire Heart's Cry (JPN) 2001	Sunday Silence (USA); 1986	Halo	Cosmah
Sire Heart's Cry (JPN) 2001	Sunday Silence (USA); 1986	Wishing Well	Understanding
Sire Heart's Cry (JPN) 2001	Sunday Silence (USA); 1986	Wishing Well	Mountain Flower
Sire Heart's Cry (JPN) 2001	Irish Dance (USA); 1990	Tony Bin	Kampala
Sire Heart's Cry (JPN) 2001	Irish Dance (USA); 1990	Tony Bin	Severn Bridge
Sire Heart's Cry (JPN) 2001	Irish Dance (USA); 1990	Buper Dance	Lyphard
Sire Heart's Cry (JPN) 2001	Irish Dance (USA); 1990	Buper Dance	My Bupers
Dam Omega Spirit (JPN) 2001 F. no: 3-d	Spinning World (USA); 1993	Nureyev	Northern Dancer
Dam Omega Spirit (JPN) 2001 F. no: 3-d	Spinning World (USA); 1993	Nureyev	Special
Dam Omega Spirit (JPN) 2001 F. no: 3-d	Spinning World (USA); 1993	Imperfect Circle	Riverman
Dam Omega Spirit (JPN) 2001 F. no: 3-d	Spinning World (USA); 1993	Imperfect Circle	Aviance
Dam Omega Spirit (JPN) 2001 F. no: 3-d	Fager's Prospect (USA); 1990	Chief's Crown	Danzig
Dam Omega Spirit (JPN) 2001 F. no: 3-d	Fager's Prospect (USA); 1990	Chief's Crown	Six Crowns
Dam Omega Spirit (JPN) 2001 F. no: 3-d	Fager's Prospect (USA); 1990	Fager's Glory	Mr. Prospector
Dam Omega Spirit (JPN) 2001 F. no: 3-d	Fager's Prospect (USA); 1990	Fager's Glory	Street's Glory

- Nuovo Record is an inbred by 5 x 4 x 5 of Northern Dancer (Lyphard's and Danzig's sire)
