= Shonan Pandora =

Japanese-bred Thoroughbred racehorse

Shonan Pandora; ショウナンパンドラ
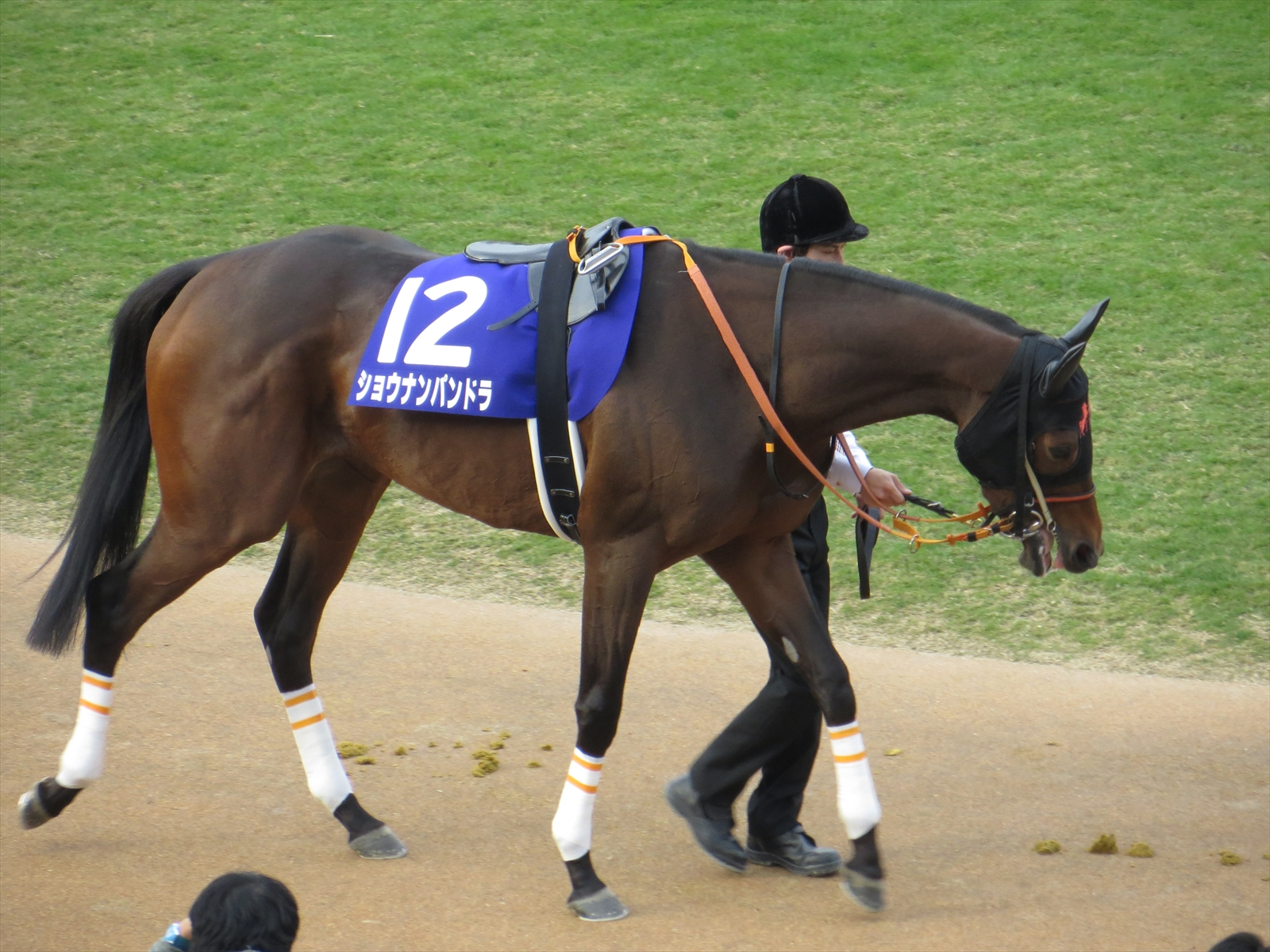
- Shonan Pandora in November 2014
- Sire: Deep Impact
- Grandsire: Sunday Silence
- Dam: Cutie Gold
- Damsire: French Deputy
- Sex: Mare
- Foaled: 10 March 2011
- Country: Japan
- Colour: Bay
- Breeder: Shiraoi Farm, Shadai Corporation
- Owner: Tetsuhide Kunimoto
- Racing colours
- Trainer: Tomokazu Takano
- Jockey: Suguru Hamanaka; Kenichi Ikezoe
- Record: 18: 5-4-3
- Earnings: 607,688,000 JPY

Major wins
- Sankei Sho All Comers (2015); Japan Cup (2015); Japanese Classic Tiara Race wins: Shuka Sho (2014)

Awards
- JRA Award for Best Older Filly or Mare (2015)

Shonan Pandora (Japanese ショウナンパンドラ, foaled 10 March 2011) is a Japanese Thoroughbred racehorse and broodmare, best known for her victory in the 2015 Japan Cup. After finishing second on her only start as a juvenile in 2013 the filly made steady progress in the following year and won the Grade 1 Shuka Sho on her penultimate appearance. She reached her peak in 2015 when she finished third in the Takarazuka Kinen, won the Sankei Sho All Comers and ran fourth in the Tenno Sho before defeating a strong international field to take the Japan Cup. Her performances that year saw her being awarded the JRA Award for Best Older Filly or Mare. She was retired from racing after finishing third twice as a five-year-old.

== Background ==
Shonan Pandora is a small bay mare with no white markings bred at the Shiraoi Farm in Hokkaido by the Shadai Corporation. During her track career she was trained by Tomokazu Takano and carried the red and white colours of the Japanese businessman Kunimoto Tetsuhide.

She is from the fourth crop of foals sired by Deep Impact, who was the Japanese Horse of the Year in 2005 and 2006, winning races including the Tokyo Yushun, Tenno Sho, Arima Kinen and Japan Cup. Deep Impact's other progeny include Gentildonna, Harp Star, Kizuna, A Shin Hikari, Satono Diamond and Makahiki. Shonan Pandora's dam Cutie Gold failed to win a race in five attempts but was a half-sister of the leading racehorse and sire Stay Gold. She was a female-line descendant of the British broodmare Salecraft, a half-sister of the Epsom Derby winner Straight Deal.

== Racing career ==
=== 2013: two-year-old season ===
Shonan Pandora began her racing career in a race for newcomers over 1800 metres at Hanshin Racecourse on 8 December and finished second of the nine runners behind Blue Flash.

=== 2014: three-year-old season ===
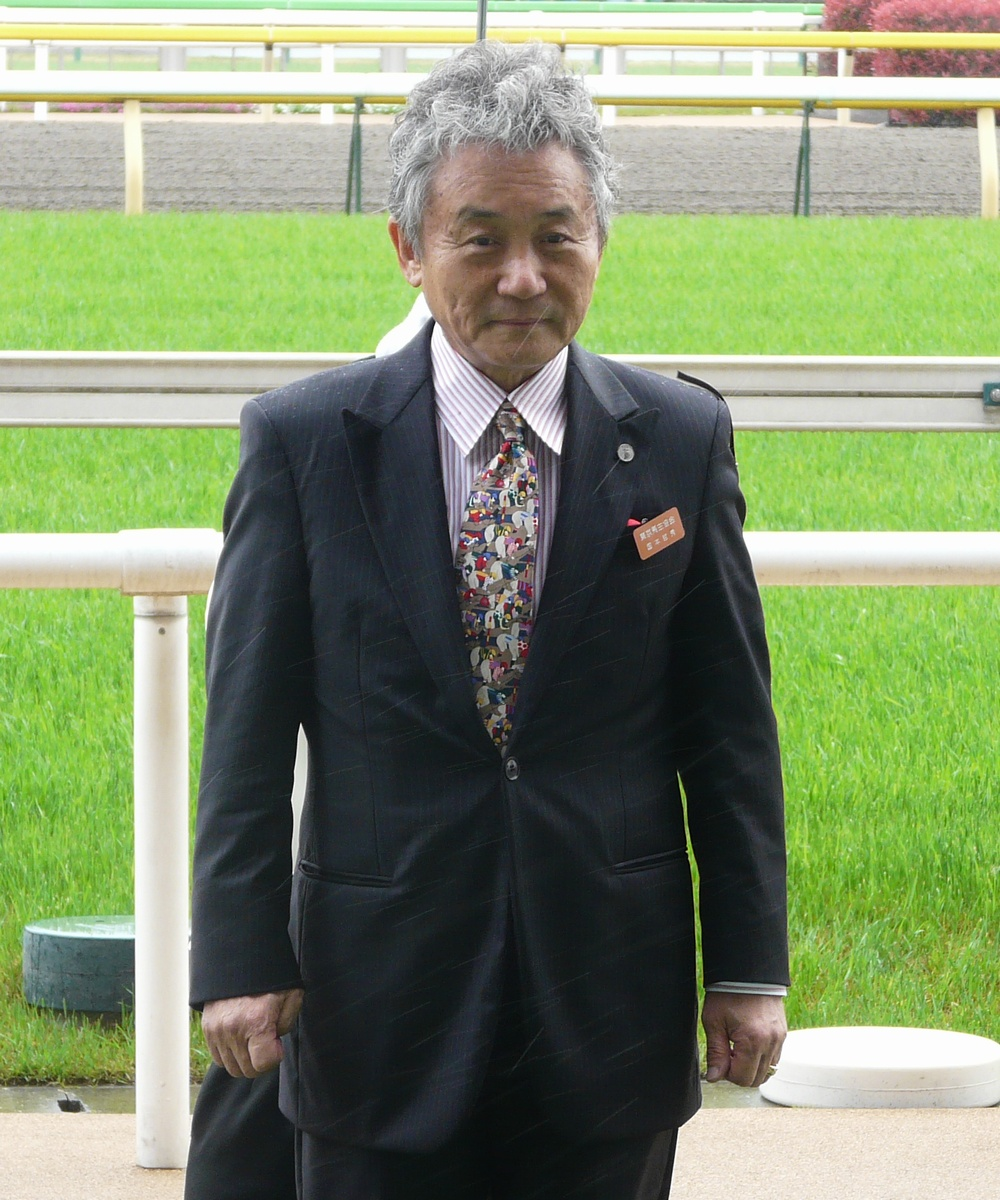
Shonan Pandora's owner Tetsuhide Kunimoto

Shonan Pandora recorded her first victory on her three-year-old debut when she won a maiden race over 200 metres at Kyoto Racecourse in January. She was beaten in her next four races when tried against better opposition: she finished second in the Elfin Stakes, fifth in the Grade 3 Flower Stakes, fifth in the listed Sweetpea Stakes and second in the Carnation Cup. The filly then won over 2000 metres at Niigata Racecourse in August and then ran second to Reve dEtoiles in the Listed Shion Stakes over the same course and distance.

On 19 October at Kyoto, Shonan Pandora was one of seventeen three-year-old fillies to contest the Grade 1 Shuka Sho, the third leg of the Japanese Fillies' Triple Crown. The Yushun Himba winner Nuovo Record started odds-on favourite ahead of Red Reveur (Hanshin Juvenile Fillies) with Shonan Pandora being made the 9.1/1 third choice in the betting. Ridden by Suguru Hamanaka, Shonan Pandora raced in mid-division before moving up to track the leaders on the final turn. She moved up on the inside rail to take the lead halfway down the straight and held off the late challenge of Nuovo Record to win by a neck. The winning time of 1:57.0 was a new record for the race. Explaining his tactics Hamanaka said "We got off to a very smooth start and I couldn’t have asked for a better position during the trip. We were able to turn for home without hitting a single bump. The turf on the inside was clearly faster so I was set on taking that route". He went on to say "We’ve always thought the world of her, but she matured a lot both mentally and physically over the summer. You can notice it right away in the workouts, in the races. She’s a G1 winner now so I hope she keeps racing well and lives up to that title from here on".

On her final run of the year Shonan Pandora was matched against older fillies and mares in the Queen Elizabeth II Cup at Kyoto in November and finished sixth behind the four-year-old Lachesis.

=== 2015: four-year-old season ===
Shonan Pandora made little impact in her first two runs as a four-year-old, finishing ninth to Lachesis in the Osaka Hai and eighth behind Straight Girl in the Victoria Mile. After these races Kenichi Ikezoe took over from Hamanaka as the filly's jockey and rode her in all of her subsequent races. When she was matched against male opposition in the Grade 1 Takarazuka Kinen over 2200 metres on 28 June at Hanshin, she was given little chance and started at odds of 98/1. She belied her odds as she produced her best performance up to that point, finishing third behind Lovely Day and Denim And Ruby. The horses finishing behind her included Toho Jackal (Kikuka Sho), Nuovo Record, Lachesis, One and Only (Tokyo Yushun) and Gold Ship.

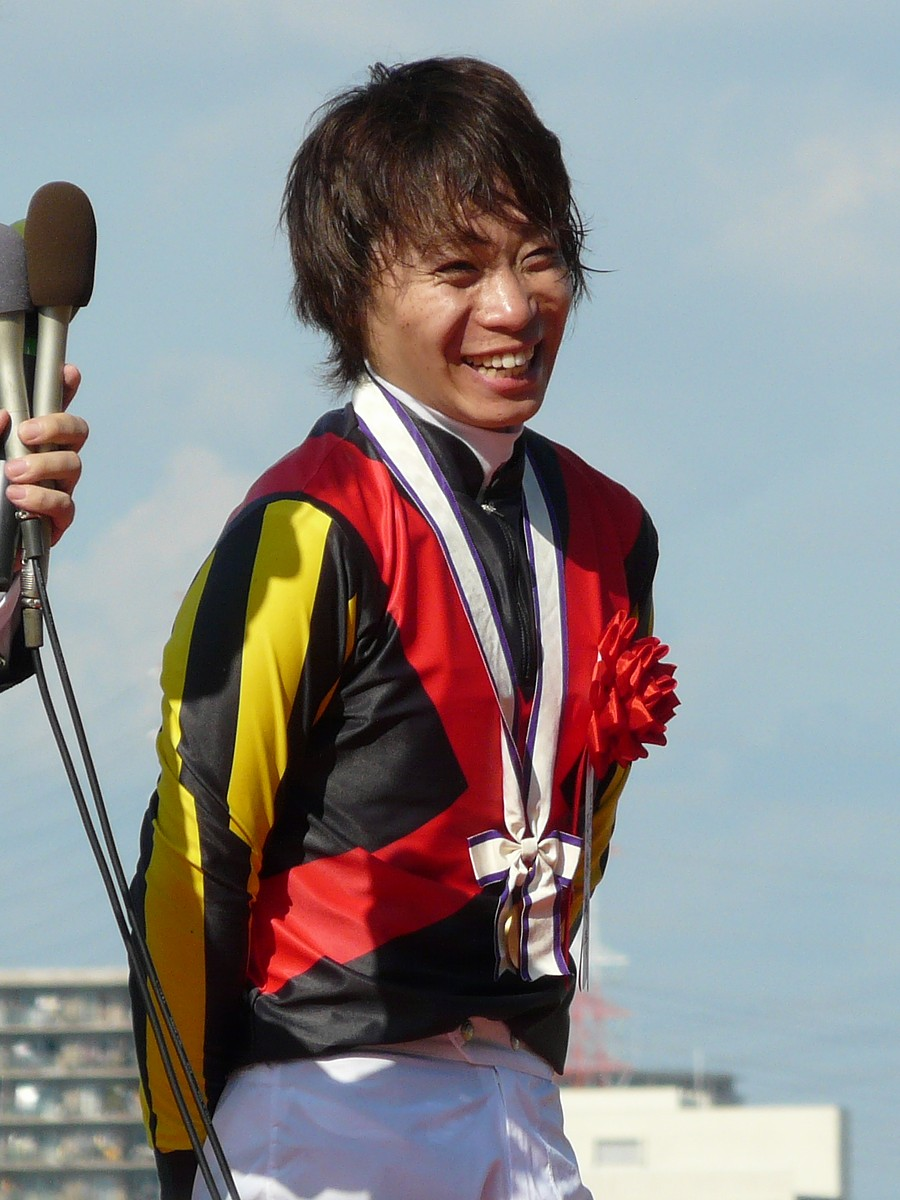
Kenichi Ikezoe, who rode Shonan Pandora to victory in the Japan Cup

After a three-month summer break, Shonan Pandora returned in the Grade 2 Sankei Sho All Comers over 2200 metres at Nakayama Racecourse on 27 September. She started the 6.6/1 third favourite behind Nuovo Record and Logotype (Satsuki Sho) in a fifteen-runner field. The filly recorded her first win of the season as she came home a length and a half ahead of Nuovo Record with a gap of three and a half lengths back to Mitra in third place. At Tokyo Racecourse on 1 November she started at odds of 8/1 for the autumn edition of the Tenno Sho over 2000 metres. She finished fourth behind Lovely Day, Staphanos and Isla Bonita (Satsuki Sho) beaten less than one and a half lengths by the winner with A Shin Hikari, Spielberg (winner of the race in 2014), One And Only and Satono Crown among the unplaced finishers.

On 29 November Shonan Pandora was one of sixteen horses to contest the 35th running of the Japan Cup over 2400 metres at Tokyo and was made the 8.2/1 fourth choice in the betting market behind Lovely Day, Gold Ship and Mikki Queen (Yushun Himba, Shuka Sho). The race attracted four challengers from Europe, namely Trip To Paris, Erupt (Grand Prix de Paris), Nightflower (Preis von Europa) and Ito (Grosser Preis von Bayern). The best-fancied of the other Japanese runners were Sounds of Earth and Last Impact (Kyoto Daishoten). Ikezoe settled the filly in mid-division as the outsider Curren Mirotic set the pace, but began to make steady progress approaching the final turn. Lovely Day went to the front in the straight but Shonan Pandora launched a strong challenge on the outside, closely followed by Sounds of Earth, whilst Last Impact made rapid progress on the inside rail. The filly gained the advantage in the final strides and won by a neck from Last Impact with Lovely Day a neck away in third. The first fifteen finishers were covered by only four and a half lengths. Asked about the filly's future, her trainer Tomokazu Takano said "She is a very small-built filly and there are a lot of races in Japan where she could show her strength. It will be totally up to the owner. She is a filly with an independent mind. She isn't a bad horse but she is territorial". Ikezoe explained "For the Tenno Sho, she had been in good shape but we couldn’t get a good position. I felt that God was testing me, giving me this chance to make good on things. Today, I decided not to wait as much before making my move. I rode more aggressively. She was nicely in hand and feeling very supple and very light-footed. She gets that from her sire... there was a lot of bumping around. She got bumped too but it didn’t bother her. She squeezed through. Today, I really seriously rode to win. And, since I won, I think God would now approve".

=== 2016: five-year-old season ===
Shonan Pandora returned as a five-year-old and made her seasonal debut at Hanshin on 3 April when she finished third behind Ambitious and Kitasan Black in the Osaka Hai. On 15 May she was dropped back in distance for a second attempt at the Victoria Mile but was beaten into third place behind Straight Girl and Mikki Queen. She did not run competitively again and was retired from racing at the end of the season.

== Racing form ==
Shonan Pandora won five races and hit the podium seven more times out of 18 starts. This data is available based on JBIS and netkeiba.

| Date | Track | Race | Grade | Distance (Condition) | Entry | HN | Odds (Favored) | Finish | Time | Margins | Jockey | Winner (Runner-up) |
|---|---|---|---|---|---|---|---|---|---|---|---|---|
2013 – two-year-old season
| Dec 8 | Hanshin | 2yo Newcomer | | 1,800 m (Firm) | 9 | 7 | 3.3 (2) | 2nd | 1:49.2 | 0.1 | Suguru Hamanaka | Blue Flash |
2014 – three-year-old season
| Jan 5 | Kyoto | 3yo Maiden | | 2,000 m (Firm) | 16 | 15 | 2.8 (1) | 1st | 2:01.0 | –0.2 | Suguru Hamanaka | (Ice Break) |
| Feb 8 | Kyoto | Elfin Stakes | OP | 1,600 m (Soft) | 11 | 3 | 2.9 (1) | 2nd | 1:38.0 | 0.3 | Suguru Hamanaka | Shiny Girl |
| Mar 21 | Nakayama | Flower Cup | 3 | 1,800 m (Firm) | 16 | 5 | 3.9 (1) | 5th | 1:51.8 | 0.5 | Suguru Hamanaka | Bounce Shasse |
| May 4 | Tokyo | Sweetpea Stakes | OP | 1,800 m (Firm) | 16 | 10 | 2.8 (1) | 5th | 1:47.8 | 0.5 | Haruhiko Kawasu | Shiny Girl |
| May 24 | Tokyo | Carnation Cup | ALW (1W) | 1,800 m (Firm) | 17 | 17 | 5.5 (3) | 2nd | 1:47.7 | 0.0 | Craig Williams | Hazy Moon |
| Aug 16 | Niigata | Itoigawa Tokubetsu | ALW (1W) | 2,000 m (Soft) | 14 | 2 | 2.0 (1) | 1st | 2:00.1 | –0.4 | Yasunari Iwata | (Makeup) |
| Sep 13 | Niigata | Shion Stakes | OP | 2,000 m (Heavy) | 18 | 7 | 2.8 (1) | 2nd | 2:03.3 | 0.0 | Yasunari Iwata | Reve d'Etoiles |
| Oct 19 | Kyoto | Shuka Sho | 1 | 2,000 m (Firm) | 17 | 6 | 10.1 (3) | 1st | 1:57.0 | 0.0 | Suguru Hamanaka | (Nuovo Record) |
| Nov 16 | Kyoto | QEII Cup | 1 | 2,200 m (Firm) | 18 | 12 | 8.9 (4) | 6th | 2:12.7 | 0.4 | Suguru Hamanaka | Lachesis |
2015 – four-year-old season
| Apr 5 | Hanshin | Sankei Osaka Hai | 2 | 2,000 m (Heavy) | 14 | 10 | 21.8 (7) | 9th | 2:04.8 | 1.9 | Suguru Hamanaka | Lachesis |
| May 17 | Tokyo | Victoria Mile | 1 | 1,600 m (Firm) | 18 | 17 | 16.2 (7) | 8th | 1:32.8 | 0.9 | Suguru Hamanaka | Straight Girl |
| Jun 28 | Hanshin | Takarazuka Kinen | 1 | 2,200 m (Firm) | 16 | 1 | 99.2 (11) | 3rd | 2:14.6 | 0.2 | Kenichi Ikezoe | Lovely Day |
| Sep 27 | Nakayama | Sankei Sho All Comers | 2 | 2,200 m (Firm) | 15 | 3 | 7.6 (3) | 1st | 2:11.9 | –0.2 | Kenichi Ikezoe | (Nuovo Record) |
| Nov 1 | Tokyo | Tenno Sho (Autumn) | 1 | 2,000 m (Firm) | 18 | 15 | 9.0 (5) | 4th | 1:58.6 | 0.2 | Kenichi Ikezoe | Lovely Day |
| Nov 29 | Tokyo | Japan Cup | 1 | 2,400 m (Firm) | 18 | 15 | 9.2 (4) | 1st | 2:24.7 | 0.0 | Kenichi Ikezoe | (Last Impact) |
2016 – five-year-old season
| Apr 3 | Hanshin | Sankei Osaka Hai | 2 | 2,000 m (Firm) | 11 | 8 | 5.9 (4) | 3rd | 1:59.5 | 0.2 | Kenichi Ikezoe | Ambitious |
| May 15 | Tokyo | Victoria Mile | 1 | 1,600 m (Firm) | 18 | 15 | 4.4 (2) | 3rd | 1:31.9 | 0.4 | Kenichi Ikezoe | Straight Girl |

Legend:
Turf

== Assessment and awards ==
In January 2016 at JRA Awards for 2015 Shonan Pandora was named Best Older Filly or Mare, receiving 213 of the 291 votes to take the title ahead of Straight Girl.

== Breeding record ==
At the end of her racing career, Shonan Pandora returned to her birthplace and became a broodmare at Shiraoi Farm.

c = colt, f = filly, g = gelding

| No. | Name | Foaled | Sex | Color | Sire | Wins | Races | Remarks |
|---|---|---|---|---|---|---|---|---|
| 1st | Shonan Highness | 2018 | f | Bay | Lord Kanaloa | 1 | 9 | Retired, broodmare |
| 2nd | Pandorea | 2019 | f | Bay | Lord Kanaloa | 2 | 22 | Retired, broodmare |
| 3rd | Waterhouse | 2020 | g | Dark Bay | Lord Kanaloa | 4 | 24 | Active |
| 4th | Reina Dorada | 2021 | f | Chestnut | Rey de Oro | 0 | 4 | Retired, broodmare |
| 5th | Shonan Someday | 2022 | f | Brown | Saturnalia | 3 | 17 | Active |
| 6th | Shonan Saio | 2023 | c | Chestnut | Drefong | 0 | 7 | Retired |
| 7th | Shonan Vatreni | 2024 | c | Chestnut | Epiphaneia | 1 | 2 | Active |
| 8th | (Shonan Pandora 2025) | 2025 | f | Bay | Maurice | | | |
| 9th | (Shonan Pandora 2026) | 2026 | c | Chestnut | Epiphaneia | | | |

== Pedigree ==
Pedigree of Shonan Pandora (JPN), bay mare 2011
| Sire Deep Impact (JPN) 2002 | Sunday Silence (USA); 1986 | Halo | Hail to Reason |
| Sire Deep Impact (JPN) 2002 | Sunday Silence (USA); 1986 | Halo | Cosmah |
| Sire Deep Impact (JPN) 2002 | Sunday Silence (USA); 1986 | Wishing Well | Understanding |
| Sire Deep Impact (JPN) 2002 | Sunday Silence (USA); 1986 | Wishing Well | Mountain Flower |
| Sire Deep Impact (JPN) 2002 | Wind in Her Hair (IRE); 1991 | Alzao | Lyphard |
| Sire Deep Impact (JPN) 2002 | Wind in Her Hair (IRE); 1991 | Alzao | Lady Rebecca |
| Sire Deep Impact (JPN) 2002 | Wind in Her Hair (IRE); 1991 | Burghclere | Busted |
| Sire Deep Impact (JPN) 2002 | Wind in Her Hair (IRE); 1991 | Burghclere | Highclere |
| Dam Cutie Gold (JPN) 2004 | French Deputy (USA); 1992 | Deputy Minister | Vice Regent |
| Dam Cutie Gold (JPN) 2004 | French Deputy (USA); 1992 | Deputy Minister | Mint Copy |
| Dam Cutie Gold (JPN) 2004 | French Deputy (USA); 1992 | Mitterand | Hold Your Peace |
| Dam Cutie Gold (JPN) 2004 | French Deputy (USA); 1992 | Mitterand | Laredo Lass |
| Dam Cutie Gold (JPN) 2004 | Golden Sash (JPN); 1988 | Dictus | Sanctus |
| Dam Cutie Gold (JPN) 2004 | Golden Sash (JPN); 1988 | Dictus | Doronic |
| Dam Cutie Gold (JPN) 2004 | Golden Sash (JPN); 1988 | Dyna Sash | Northern Taste |
| Dam Cutie Gold (JPN) 2004 | Golden Sash (JPN); 1988 | Dyna Sash | Royal Sash (Family: 1-t) |
