= Epsom Cup =

Epsom Cup エプソムカップ
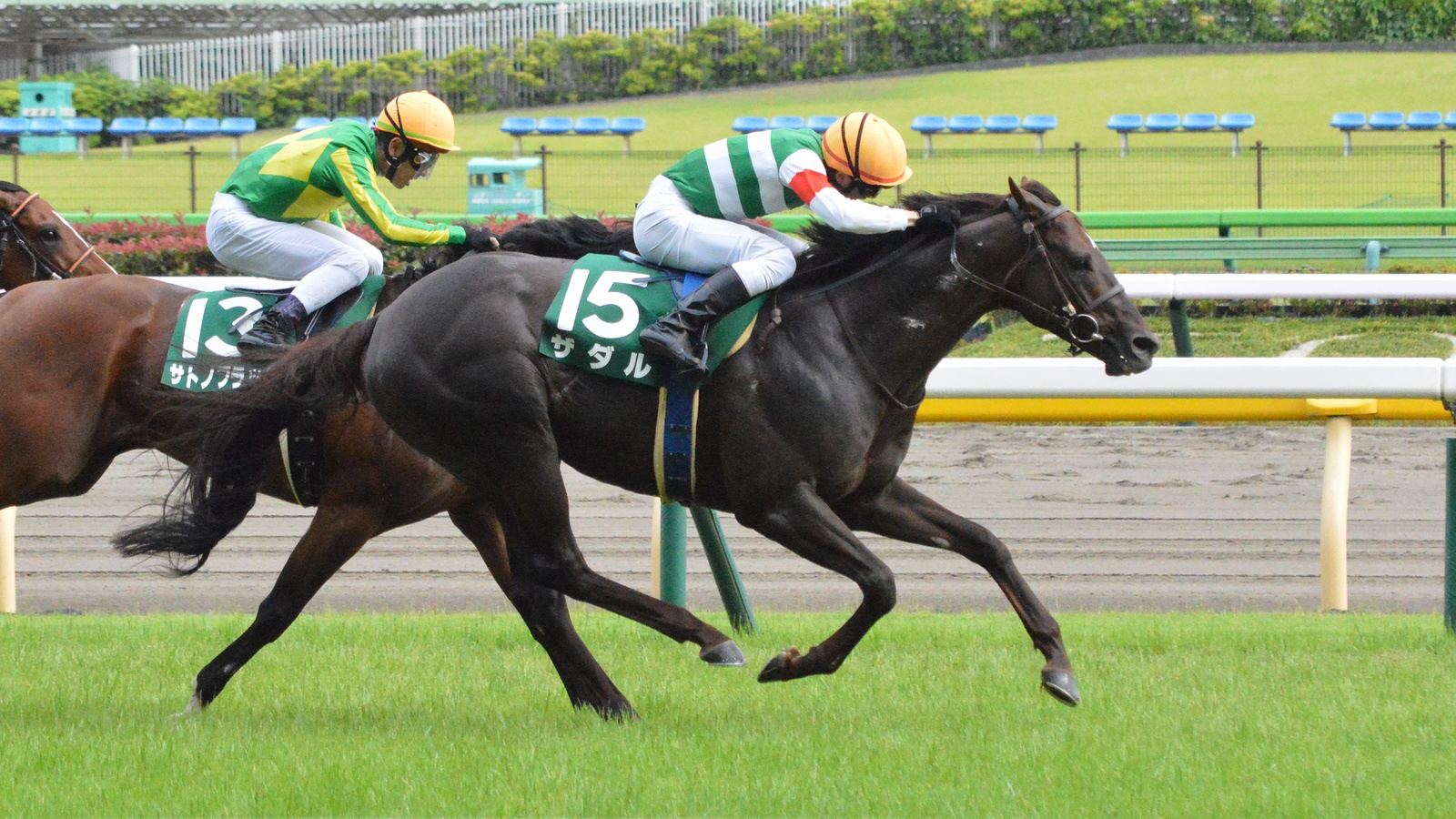
- 2021 Epsom Cup Winner, Zadar
- Class: Grade 3
- Location: Tokyo Racecourse
- Inaugurated: 1984
- Race type: Thoroughbred Flat racing

Race information
- Distance: 1800 metres
- Surface: Turf
- Track: Left-handed
- Qualification: 3-y-o+
- Weight: Special Weight
- Purse: ¥ 92,980,000 (as of 2025): 1st: ¥ 43,000,000; 2nd: ¥ 17,000,000; 3rd: ¥ 11,000,000

The Epsom Cup (Japanese エプソムカップ) is a Japanese Grade 3 Handicap horse race for Thoroughbreds aged three and over, run in May over a distance of 1800 metres at Tokyo Racecourse.

It was first run in 1984 and has held Grade 3 status ever since.

== Weight ==
53 kg for three-year-olds, 57 kg for four-year-olds and above.

Allowances:

- 2 kg for fillies / mares
- 2 kg for southern hemisphere bred three-year-olds
- 1 kg for southern hemisphere bred four-year-olds

Penalties (excluding two-year-old race performance):

- If a graded stakes race has been won within a year:
  - 3 kg for a grade 1 win (2 kg for fillies / mares)
  - 2 kg for a grade 2 win (1 kg for fillies / mares)
  - 1 kg for a grade 3 win
- If a graded stakes race has been won for more than a year:
  - 2 kg for a grade 1 win (1 kg for fillies / mares)
  - 1 kg for a grade 2 win

== Winners since 1984 ==
Year	Winner	Age	Jockey	Trainer	Owner	Time
1984	Sakura Symboli	5	Futoshi Kojima	Kubota Hikoyuki	Jeon Yong Shook	1:51.7
1985	Suzu Mach	4	Shoichi Osaki	Yoshio Nakazumi	Yoshio Komurasaki	1:50.4
1986	Super Gura Third	4	Eiji Nakano	Yoshinami Shimizu	Masahiro Hiranoi	1:50.1
1987	Dyna Fairy	4	Sueo Masuzawa	Yasuhiro Suzuki	Shadai Race Horse	1:48.1
1988	Soshin Hoju	4	Shoji Kashiwazaki	Suoki Koga	Fusako Soman	1:48.1
1989	Nihon Pillow Brave	4	Masato Shibata	Yuji Ito	Hyakutaro Kobayashi	1:50.2
1990	Samantha Tojo	5	Koichi Tsunoda	Sakae Watanabe	Tosho Sangyo	1:47.7
1991	Prekrasnie	4	Teruo Eda	Terumasa Yano	Eijiro Tajima	1:47.2
1992	Marumatsu Ace	4	Tomio Yasuda	Yoshio Nakazumi	Toshio Matsuda	1:47.1
1993	Sakura Sakai O	4	Futoshi Kojima	Masakatsu Sakai	Sakura Commerce	1:46.8
1994	Wako Chikako	4	Yukio Okabe	Yuji Ito	Takao Ishida	1:47.5
1995	Kanetsu Cross	4	Hitoshi Matoba	Yasuo Nishizuka	Kanetsu Kyosoba	1:48.0
1996	Marvelous Sunday	4	Yutaka Take	Makoto Osawa	Sadao Sasahara	1:45.7
1997	Taiki Marshal	5	Yukio Okabe	Kazuo Fujisawa	Taiki Farm	1:46.6
1998	Tsukuba Symphony	5	Norihiro Yokoyama	Masanori Ito	Akio Hosoya	1:48.2
1999	American Boss	4	Teruo Eda	Fuyuki Tago	Abiru Fudosan	1:46.0
2000	American Boss	5	Teruo Eda	Fuyuki Tago	Abiru Fudosan	1:49.5
2001	Admire Kaiser	5	Jun'ichi Serizawa	Mitsuru Hashida	Riichi Kondo	1:45.1
2002	Joten Brave	5	Masayoshi Ebina	Ikuo Aizawa	Hisao Tanabe	1:46.9
2003	Meiner Amundsen	4	Masayoshi Ebina	Kiyotaka Tanaka	Thoroughbred Club Ruffian	1:47.7
2004	Meiner Amundsen	5	Naohiro Onishi	Kiyotaka Tanaka	Thoroughbred Club Ruffian	1:47.8
2005	Suzuno March	5	Hiroshi Kitamura	Kazuo Fujisawa	Yoshio Koshiba	1:46.6
2006	Top Gun Joe	4	Hiroki Goto	Masamichi Wada	Takao Kawachi	1:49.2
2007	Eishin Deputy	5	Katsuhara Tanaka	Akira Nomoto	Toyomitsu Hirai	1:48.3
2008	Sunrise Max	4	Norihiro Yokoyama	Yutaka Masumoto	Takao Matsuoka	1:45.9
2009	Shingen	6	Shinji Fujita	Hirofumi Toda	Teruhito Hanaki	1:45.5
2010	Seiun Wonder	4	Yuichi Fukunaga	Masazo Ryoke	Takao Otani	1:46.1
2011	Dark Shadow	4	Yuichi Fukunaga	Noriyuki Hori	Tomokazu Iizuka	1:47.3
2012	Tosen Reve	4	Craig Williams	Yasutoshi Ikee	Takaya Shimakawa	1:46.7
2013	Clarente	4	Yasunari Iwata	Kojiro Hashiguchi	Shinji Maeda	1:45.7
2014	Decipher	5	Hirofumi Shii	Futoshi Kojima	Mohammed bin Rashid Al Maktoum	1:46.2
2015	A Shin Hikari	4	Yutaka Take	Masanori Sakaguchi	Eishindo	1:45.4
2016	Rouge Buck	4	Keita Tosaki	Masahiro Otake	Carrot Farm	1:46.2
2017	Dashing Blaze	5	Suguru Hamanaka	Keiji Yoshimura	Green Fields	1:45.9
2018	Satono Arthur	4	Keita Tosaki	Yasutoshi Ikee	Satomi Horse Company	1:47.4
2019	Leyenda	4	Christophe Lemaire	Kazuo Fujisawa	Carrot Farm	1:49.1
2020	Daiwa Cagney	6	Hiroyuki Uchida	Takanori Kikuzawa	Keizo Oshiro	1:47.7
2021	Zadar	5	Shu Ishibashi	Masahiro Otake	Carrot Farm	1:45.1
2022	North Bridge	4	Yasunari Iwata	Takeshi Okumura	Noboru Iyama	1:46.7
2023	Justin Cafe	5	Kazuo Yokoyama	Shogo Yasuda	Masahiro Miki	1:45.5
2024	Lebensstil	4	Christophe Lemaire	Hiroyasu Tanaka	Carrot Farm	1:44.7
2025	Seiun Hades	6	Hideaki Miyuki	Shinsuke Hashiguchi	Shigeyuki Nishiyama	1:43.9 (Note: Broke the course record)
2026	Trovatore	5	Christophe Lemaire	Yuichi Shikato	Sunday Racing	1:45.3

== See also ==
- Horse racing in Japan
- List of Japanese flat horse races
