= A Shin Hikari =

Japanese-bred Thoroughbred racehorse

A Shin Hikari エイシンヒカリ
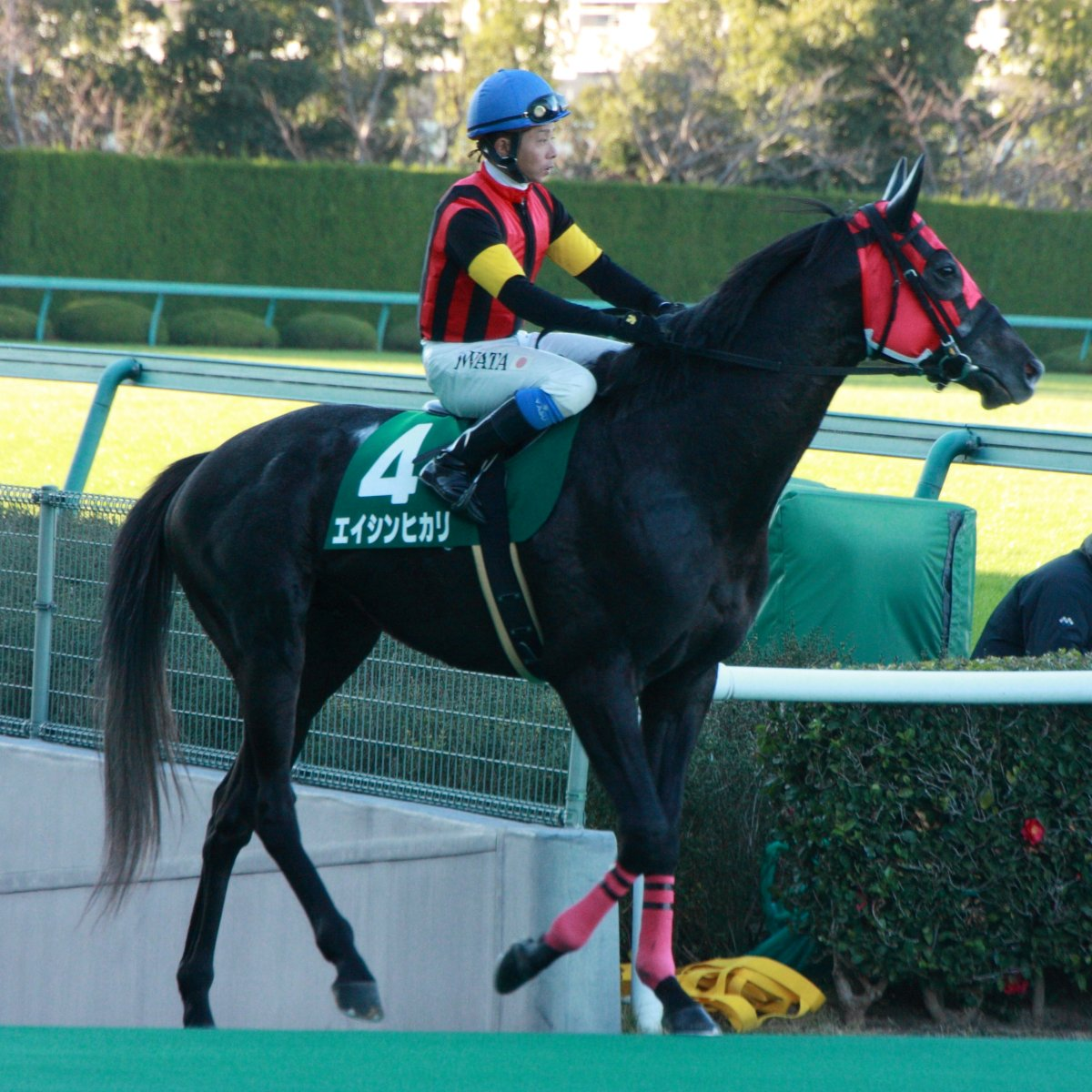
- A Shin Hikari in December 2014
- Sire: Deep Impact
- Grandsire: Sunday Silence
- Dam: Catalina
- Damsire: Storm Cat
- Sex: Stallion
- Foaled: 3 May 2011
- Country: Japan
- Colour: Grey
- Breeder: Kida Ranch
- Owner: Eishindo Co Ltd
- Racing colours
- Trainer: Masanori Sakaguchi
- Jockey: Yutaka Take
- Record: 15: 10-0-0
- Earnings: ¥437,617,200

Major wins
- Epsom Cup (2015); Mainichi Okan (2015); Hong Kong Cup (2015); Prix d'Ispahan (2016)

Honours
- Top-rated Japanese horse (2016); Timeform rating: 133
- Last updated on 11 March 2026

A Shin Hikari (Japanese エイシンヒカリ, Hepburn: Ei Shin Hikari; foaled 3 May 2011) is a retired Japanese Thoroughbred racehorse. He began his racing career as a three-year-old in 2014 when he won his first five races including the Listed Ireland Trophy. In the following year, he won the Mijakooji Stakes, Epsom Cup and Mainichi Okan in Japan before establishing himself as one of the best racehorses in the world with a victory in the Hong Kong Cup. In the spring of 2016 he was sent to Europe and began his campaign with a ten length win in the Prix d'Ispahan.

== Background ==
A Shin Hikari is a grey horse bred and owned by Eishindo Co Ltd, most of whose horses are named with the "A Shin" (or "Eishin") prefix. He is from the fourth crop of foals sired by Deep Impact who was the Japanese Horse of the Year in 2005 and 2006, winning races including the Tokyo Yushun, Tenno Sho, Arima Kinen and Japan Cup. Deep Impact's other progeny include Gentildonna, Harp Star and Kizuna. A Shin Hikari is the seventh foal of his dam Catalina who was bred in Florida and won three races in the United States before being exported to Japan to become a broodmare. She was a great-granddaughter of Lea Lark, an American broodmare whose other descendants have included Tobougg, Miswaki, Almutawakel, Southern Halo, Peter Davies and White Muzzle. The colt was trained throughout his career by Masanori Sakaguchi and was ridden in most of his major races by Yutaka Take. He usually raced in a red and black hood.

== Racing career ==
=== 2014: three-year-old season ===
A Shin Hikari was unraced as a juvenile and began his racing career by winning a maiden race over 1800 metres at Kyoto Racecourse on 26 April 2014. He followed up in a minor race over the same course and distance in May and then took the Miki Tokubetsu at Hanshin Racecourse on 7 June. After the summer break he returned to Hanshin in September and took his unbeaten streak to four in the Moonlight Handicap over 2000 metres. He was stepped up in class and recorded his fifth straight win in the Listed Ireland Trophy at Tokyo Racecourse on 19 October. On his final appearance of the year he stepped up to Grade 3 class and sustained his first defeat when he finished unplaced behind Tosen Stardom in the Challenge Cup at Hanshin on 13 December.

=== 2015: four-year-old season ===
A Shin Hikari began his second season by winning the Listed Miyakooji Stakes over 1800 metres at Kyoto in May. On 14 June he stepped back up to Grade 3 level for the Epsom Cup over the same distance at Tokyo and by a neck won from Satono Aladdin.

On his return from the summer break A Shin Hikari made his first appearance at Grade 2 level in October when he contested the Mainichi Okan at Tokyo. He was made the 3.9/1 favourite in a thirteen-runner field which also included Isla Bonita (Satsuki Sho), Spielberg (Tenno Sho) and Danon Shark (Mile Championship). He scored his biggest win up to that time as he won by a length and a quarter from Decipher with Isla Bonita in third place. On 1 November the colt was stepped up again in class for the autumn edition of the Tenno Sho and started second favourite, but finished ninth behind Lovely Day.

A Shin Hikari's final race of the year came in the Hong Kong Cup at Sha Tin Racecourse on 13 December in which he started a 25/1 outsider in a thirteen-runner field. The Irish colt Free Eagle started favourite but faced a strong challenge from the Hong Kong runners who included Designs On Rome, Military Attack, Blazing Speed (Queen Elizabeth II Cup), Dan Excel (Singapore Airlines International Cup) and Beauty Only (Hong Kong Classic Mile). The other runners were Nuovo Record (Yushun Himba) Satono Aladdin and Staphanos from Japan, Criterion (Queen Elizabeth Stakes) and Lucia Valentina (Turnbull Stakes) from Australia and Free Port Lux (Prix Dollar) from France. A Shin Hikari broke quickly from his draw on the outside and took the lead soon after the start, setting a strong pace before accelerating three lengths clear of the field early in the straight. He stayed on in the closing stages to win by a length from Nuovo Record in a race record time of 2:00.6. Yutaka Take commented "The horse was in very good condition, so I had much confidence going into the race. The horse sometimes has a difficult temperament, but he’s in good form so I thought he had a very good chance".

In the 2015 World's Best Racehorse Rankings A Shin Hikari was given a rating of 123, making him the top-rated Japanese horse and the eighth-best racehorse in the world.

=== 2016: five-year-old season ===
Following his win in Hong Kong A Shin Hikari was off the racecourse for six months before being sent to France for the Prix d'Ispahan on 24 May. The race was run at Chantilly Racecourse as its usual venue, Longchamp, was being redeveloped. He was made the 7.4/1 fourth choice behind New Bay, Dariyan (Prix Ganay) and Vadamos (Prix du Muguet) whilst the other five runners included the Grand Prix de Paris winner Erupt. Racing on heavy ground he settled in second place behind Vadamos before going to the front 400 metres from the finish. He drew further and further away from his rivals in the straight and crossed the line ten lengths clear of Dariyan. After the race Sakaguchi said "I had imagined he would jump to the front and lead the race, so I was surprised, but it was good judgement by Yutaka to run him a bit away from the rail where the ground was not as bad. It was great to see that he could settle and race from second place, as well as win with that style. We can now proudly hold our heads high and go to England for the Royal Ascot meeting". Bookmakers responded by making the horse favourite for the Prince of Wales's Stakes. In the June 2016 edition of the World's Best Racehorse Rankings A Shin Hikari was rated the best horse in the world, three pounds ahead of California Chrome and Winx.

A Shin Hikari started odds-on favourite for the Prince of Wales's Stakes at Royal Ascot on 15 June against five opponents including Found and The Grey Gatsby. After racing keenly in the early stages he led the field into the straight but then faded badly and finished last behind the upset winner My Dream Boat. After a break of four and a half months A Shin Hikari returned in the autumn edition of the Tenno Sho on 30 October. He led the field into the straight but weakened in the closing stages to finish eighth behind Maurice. In December he attempted to repeat his 2015 success in the Hong Kong Cup and started the 7.6/1 third favourite. After misbehaving before the start he took the lead and opened up an advantage of several lengths. He was still in front entering the last 200 metres but then weakened rapidly and finished tenth of the twelve runners.

== Racing form ==
A Shin Hikari won 10 races out of 15 starts. This data is available based on JBIS, netkeiba, HKJC, British Horseracing Authority and racingpost.

Date	Track	Race	Grade	Distance (Condition)	Entry	HN	Odds (Favored)	Finish	Time	Margins	Jockey	Winner (Runner-up)
2014 – three-year-old season
Apr 26	Kyoto	3yo Maiden		1,800 m (Firm)	18	7	3.7 (1)	1st	1:45.7	–0.8	Yasunari Iwata	(Curren Vittoria)
May 18	Kyoto	3yo Allowance	1W	1,800 m (Firm)	8	5	1.2 (1)	1st	1:45.5	–0.5	Ryuji Wada	(Koei One Man)
Jun 7	Hanshin	Miki Tokubetsu	ALW (2W)	1,800 m (Firm)	11	8	2.1 (1)	1st	1:47.8	–0.6	Yasunari Iwata	(Marutaka Cyclennon)
Sep 28	Hanshin	Moonlight Handicap	ALW (3W)	2,000 m (Firm)	14	7	1.7 (1)	1st	1:59.6	–0.3	Yasunari Iwata	(Sumidero Canyon)
Oct 19	Tokyo	Ireland Trophy	OP	2,000 m (Firm)	8	2	1.4 (1)	1st	1:58.3	–0.6	Norihiro Yokoyama	(X Mark)
Dec 13	Hanshin	Challenge Cup	3	1,800 m (Firm)	12	4	1.9 (1)	9th	1:46.8	0.9	Yasunari Iwata	Tosen Stardom
2015 – four-year-old season
May 16	Kyoto	Miyakooji Stakes	OP	1,800 m (Good)	13	2	2.1 (1)	1st	1:45.7	–0.2	Yutaka Take	(Grandezza)
Jun 14	Tokyo	Epsom Cup	3	1,800 m (Firm)	13	6	3.0 (2)	1st	1:45.4	0.0	Yutaka Take	(Satono Aladdin)
Oct 11	Tokyo	Mainichi Okan	2	1,800 m (Firm)	13	13	4.9 (1)	1st	1:45.6	–0.2	Yutaka Take	(Decipher)
Nov 1	Tokyo	Tenno Sho (Autumn)	1	2,000 m (Firm)	18	9	4.3 (2)	9th	1:59.1	0.7	Yutaka Take	Lovely Day
Dec 13	Sha Tin	Hong Kong Cup	1	2,000 m (Good)	13	11	38.0 (9)	1st	R2:00.6	–0.2	Yutaka Take	(Nuovo Record)
2016 – five-year-old season
May 24	Chantilly	Prix d'Ispahan	1	1,800 m (Soft)	9	3	74/10 (4)	1st	1:53.3	–2.0	Yutaka Take	(Dariyan)
Jun 15	Ascot	Prince of Wales's Stakes	1	10 f (Soft)	6	1	8/13 (1)	6th	2:12.4	1.0	Yutaka Take	My Dream Boat
Oct 30	Tokyo	Tenno Sho (Autumn)	1	2,000 m (Firm)	15	1	4.5 (2)	12th	2:00.6	1.3	Yutaka Take	Maurice
Dec 11	Sha Tin	Hong Kong Cup	1	2,000 m (Firm)	12	1	4.1 (2)	10th	2:02.1	1.2	Yutaka Take	Maurice

Legend:
Turf

- R indicates that it was a record time finish

== Assessment ==
In the 2015 World's Best Racehorse Rankings A Shin Hikari was given a rating of 123, making him the top-rated Japanese horse and the eighth-best racehorse in the world.

In the 2016 edition of the World's Best Racehorse Rankings A Shin Hikari was given a rating of 127 (level with Maurice), making him the 5th best racehorse in the world and the top-rated horse in Japan.

== Pedigree ==
Pedigree of A Shin Hikari (JPN), grey stallion 2011
Sire Deep Impact (JPN) 2002	Sunday Silence (USA); 1986	Halo	Hail to Reason
Sire Deep Impact (JPN) 2002	Sunday Silence (USA); 1986	Halo	Cosmah
Sire Deep Impact (JPN) 2002	Sunday Silence (USA); 1986	Wishing Well	Understanding
Sire Deep Impact (JPN) 2002	Sunday Silence (USA); 1986	Wishing Well	Mountain Flower
Sire Deep Impact (JPN) 2002	Wind in Her Hair (IRE); 1991	Alzao	Lyphard
Sire Deep Impact (JPN) 2002	Wind in Her Hair (IRE); 1991	Alzao	Lady Rebecca
Sire Deep Impact (JPN) 2002	Wind in Her Hair (IRE); 1991	Burghclere	Busted
Sire Deep Impact (JPN) 2002	Wind in Her Hair (IRE); 1991	Burghclere	Highclere
Dam Catalina (USA) 1994	Storm Cat (USA); 1983	Storm Bird	Northern Dancer
Dam Catalina (USA) 1994	Storm Cat (USA); 1983	Storm Bird	South Ocean
Dam Catalina (USA) 1994	Storm Cat (USA); 1983	Terlingua	Secretariat
Dam Catalina (USA) 1994	Storm Cat (USA); 1983	Terlingua	Crimson Saint
Dam Catalina (USA) 1994	Carolina Saga (USA); 1980	Caro	Fortino
Dam Catalina (USA) 1994	Carolina Saga (USA); 1980	Caro	Chambord
Dam Catalina (USA) 1994	Carolina Saga (USA); 1980	Key to the Saga	Key to the Mint
Dam Catalina (USA) 1994	Carolina Saga (USA); 1980	Key to the Saga	Sea Saga (Family: 16-g)
