= Sankei Sho All Comers =

Sankei Sho All Comers 産経賞オールカマー
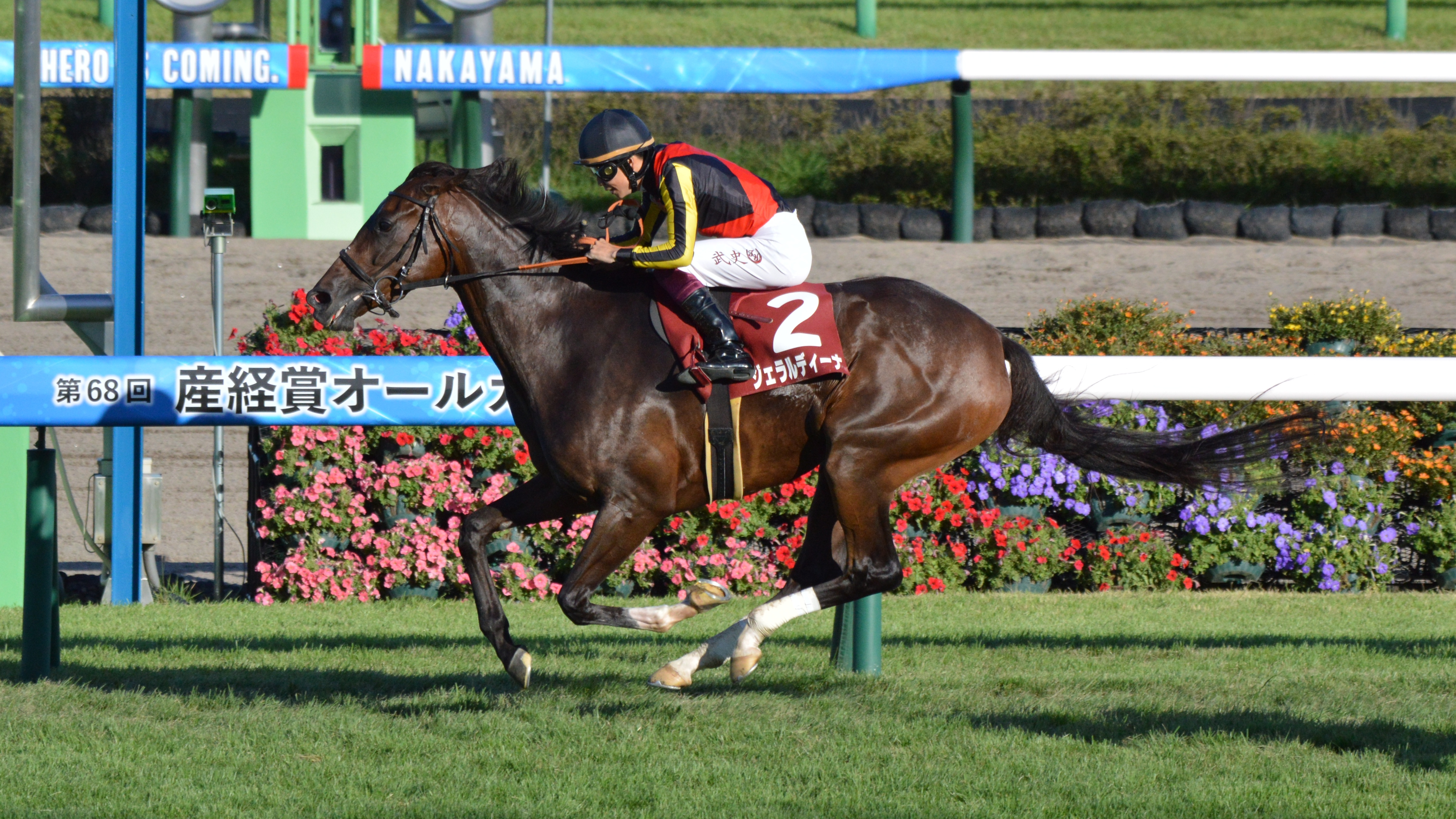
- Geraldina winning the Sankei Sho All Comers in 2022
- Class: Grade 2
- Location: Nakayama Racecourse
- Inaugurated: 1955
- Race type: Thoroughbred Flat racing

Race information
- Distance: 2200 metres
- Surface: Turf
- Track: Right-handed
- Qualification: 3-y-o +
- Weight: Special Weight
- Purse: ¥ 145,220,000 (as of 2025): 1st: ¥ 67,000,000; 2nd: ¥ 27,000,000; 3rd: ¥ 17,000,000

The Sankei Sho All Comers (Japanese 産経賞オールカマー) is a Grade 2 horse race for Thoroughbreds aged three years and over run in September over a distance of 2,200 metres at Nakayama Racecourse.

It was first run in 1955 and was promoted to Grade 3 in 1984 when its distance was increased from 2,000 metres. The race was elevated to Grade 2 class in 1995. The race often serves as a trial race for the autumn edition of the Tenno Sho, and from 2014 the winner of this race is given a priority entry slot. Winners of the race have included Oguri Cap, Shonan Pandora and Rey de Oro.

== Weight ==
54 kg for three-year-olds, 57 kg for four-year-olds and above.

Allowances:

- 2 kg for fillies / mares
- 2 kg for southern hemisphere bred three-year-olds

Penalties (excluding two-year-old race performance):

- If a graded stakes race has been won within a year:
  - 2 kg for a grade 1 win (1 kg for fillies / mares)
  - 1 kg for a grade 2 win
- If a graded stakes race has been won for more than a year:
  - 1 kg for a grade 1 win

== Winners since 2000 ==
| Year | Winner | Age | Jockey | Trainer | Owner | Time |
|---|---|---|---|---|---|---|
| 2000 | Meisho Doto | 4 | Hitoshi Matoba | Isao Yasuda | Yoshio Matsumoto | 2:15.8 |
| 2001 | Air Smap | 6 | Yoshitomi Shibata | Kazuo Fujisawa | Lucky Field | 2:13.9 |
| 2002 | Rosado^{[1]} | 6 | Hiroki Goto | Kojiro Hashiguchi | Shadai Race Horse | 2:11.7 |
| 2003 | Air Eminem | 5 | Masayoshi Ebina | Yasunori Ito | Lucky Field | 2.14.4 |
| 2004 | Tosen Dandy | 6 | Masayuki Katsuura | Hideyuki Mori | Takaya Shimakawa | 2.13.4 |
| 2005 | Hookipa Wave | 4 | Hiroki Goto | Yoshitaka Ninomiya | Kaneko Makoto Holdings | 2:16.7 |
| 2006 | Balance of Game | 7 | Katsuharu Tanaka | Yoshitada Munakata | Hiroyuki Sonobe | 2:12.1 |
| 2007 | Matsurida Gogh | 4 | Masayoshi Ebina | Sakae Kunieda | Fumie Takahashi | 2:12.5 |
| 2008 | Matsurida Gogh | 5 | Masayoshi Ebina | Sakae Kunieda | Fumie Takahashi | 2:12.0 |
| 2009 | Matsurida Gogh | 6 | Norihiro Yokoyama | Sakae Kunieda | Fumie Takahashi | 2:11.4 |
| 2010 | Shingen | 7 | Shinji Fujita | Hirofumi Toda | Chizu Yoshida | 2:11.4 |
| 2011 | Earnestly | 6 | Tetsuzo Sato | Shozo Sasaki | Koji Maeda | 2:11.2 |
| 2012 | Nakayama Knight | 4 | Yoshitomi Shibata | Yoshitaka Ninomiya | Shinichi Izumi | 2:15.5 |
| 2013 | Verde Green | 5 | Hironobu Tanabe | Ikuo Aizawa | Mitsumasa Saito | 2:12.0 |
| 2014 | Meiner Lacrima^{[1]} | 6 | Keita Tosaki | Hiroyuki Uehara | Thoroughbred Club Ruffian | 2:12.2 |
| 2015 | Shonan Pandora | 4 | Kenichi Ikezoe | Tomokazu Takano | Tetsuhide Kunimoto | 2:11.9 |
| 2016 | Gold Actor | 5 | Hayato Yoshida | Tadashige Nakagawa | Hisayo Ishiro | 2:11.9 |
| 2017 | Rouge Buck | 5 | Hiroshi Kitamura | Masahiro Otake | Carrot Farm | 2:13.8 |
| 2018 | Rey de Oro | 4 | Christophe Lemaire | Kazuo Fujisawa | Carrot Farm | 2:11.2 |
| 2019 | Stiffelio | 5 | Genki Maruyama | Hidetaka Otonashi | Shadai Race Horse | 2:12.0 |
| 2020 | Centelleo | 5 | Keita Tosaki | Tomokazu Takano | Carrot Farm | 2:15.5 |
| 2021 | Win Marilyn | 4 | Takeshi Yokoyama | Takahisa Tezuka | Win | 2:11.9 |
| 2022 | Geraldina | 4 | Takeshi Yokoyama | Takashi Saito | Sunday Racing | 2:12.7 |
| 2023 | Rousham Park | 4 | Christophe Lemaire | Hiroyasu Tanaka | Sunday Racing | 2:12.0 |
| 2024 | Lebensstil | 4 | Christophe Lemaire | Hiroyasu Tanaka | Carrot Farm | 2:11.8 |
| 2025 | Regaleira | 4 | Keita Tosaki | Tetsuya Kimura | Sunday Racing | 2:10.2 |
| 2026 | Meisho Gekirin | 7 | Hironobu Tanabe | Kazuhide Sasada | Yoshitaka Matsumoto | 2:16.9 |

^{1} The 2002 and 2014 races took place at Niigata Racecourse.

== Earlier winners ==
- 1955 - Meiji Hikari
- 1956 - Toyotani
- 1957 - Kitano O
- 1958 - Masatakara
- 1959 - Unebi Hikari
- 1960 - Yashima First
- 1961 - Azuma Tenran
- 1962 - Liuyu Musashi
- 1963 - Myosotis
- 1964 - Flower Wood
- 1965 - Michalkas
- 1966 - Hishi Masahide
- 1967 - Onward Well
- 1968 - Sweet Flag
- 1969 - Light World
- 1970 - Makino Hope
- 1971 - Kikuno Happy
- 1972 - Inaboles
- 1973 - Haku Hosho
- 1974 - Ichifuji Isami
- 1975 - Kikuno O
- 1976 - Great Seikan
- 1977 - Tofuku Sedan
- 1978 - Haseouma
- 1979 - Yuki Fukuo
- 1980 - Blue Max
- 1981 - Hase Shinobu
- 1982 - Todoroki Hihou
- 1983 - Sweet Carson
- 1984 - Asaka Silver
- 1985 - Asaka Silent
- 1986 - Jusaburo
- 1987 - Dyna Fairy
- 1988 - Suzu Parade
- 1989 - Oguri Cap
- 1990 - Racket Ball
- 1991 - George Monarch
- 1992 - Ikuno Dictus
- 1993 - Twin Turbo
- 1994 - Biwa Hayahide
- 1995 - Hishi Amazon
- 1996 - Sakura Laurel
- 1997 - Mejiro Dober
- 1998 - Daiwa Texas
- 1999 - Hokkai Rousseau

== See also ==
- Horse racing in Japan
- List of Japanese flat horse races
