= Harp Star =

Japanese-bred Thoroughbred racehorse

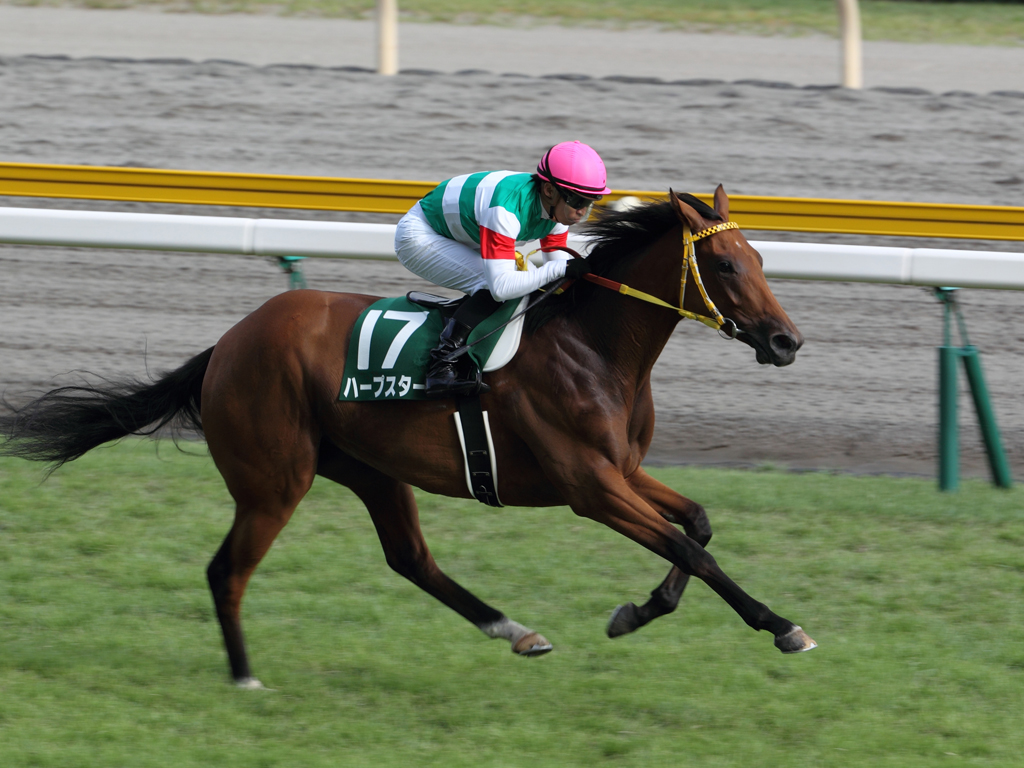
- Harp Star at the 2013 Niigata Nisai Stakes
- Sire: Deep Impact
- Grandsire: Sunday Silence
- Dam: Historic Star
- Damsire: Falbrav
- Sex: Mare
- Foaled: 24 April 2011
- Country: Japan
- Colour: Bay
- Breeder: Northern Farm
- Owner: U Carrot Farm
- Racing colours
- Trainer: Hiroyoshi Matsuda
- Jockey: Yuga Kawada
- Record: 11: 5-2-0
- Earnings: ¥360,248,000

Major wins
- Niigata Nisai Stakes (2013); Tulip Sho (2014); Sapporo Kinen (2014); Japanese Classic Tiara wins: Oka Sho (2014)

Awards
- JRA Award for Best Three-Year-Old Filly (2014)
- Last updated on 11 March 2026

Harp Star (Japanese: ハープスター, foaled 24 April 2011) is a Japanese retired Thoroughbred racehorse and broodmare. She was one of the leading two-year-old fillies in Japan in 2013 when she won the Niigata Nisai Stakes and was narrowly beaten in the Hanshin Juvenile Fillies. In the following year she won the Tulip Sho and the Oka Sho before rebounding from a surprise defeat in the Yushun Himba to beat Gold Ship in the Sapporo Kinen.

== Background ==
Harp Star is a bay filly with a small white star and white socks on her hind legs bred in Japan by Northern Farm. She is from the fourth crop of foals sired by Deep Impact who was the Japanese Horse of the Year in 2005 and 2006, winning races including the Tokyo Yushun, Tenno Sho, Arima Kinen and Japan Cup. Deep Impact's other progeny include Gentildonna and Kizuna. Harp Star's dam Historic Star was an unraced daughter of the Japan Cup winner Falbrav and the broodmare Vega, who won the Oka Sho and Yushun Himba in 1993. Vega was a descendant of the American mare Nellie Morse, making her a distant relative of the 1976 Kentucky Derby winner Bold Forbes and multi-millionaire racehorse and sire Bet Twice.

During her racing career, Harp Star has been owned by the U Carrot Farm and trained by Hiroyoshi Matsuda. She has been ridden in all of her races by Yuga Kawada.

== Racing career ==
=== 2013: two-year-old season ===
Harp Star began her racing career by winning a race for newcomers at over 1400 metres at Chukyo Racecourse on 14 July. She was then moved up in class and distance for the Grade III Niigata Nisai Stakes over 1600 metres at Niigata Racecourse on 25 August. She was restrained at the back of the eighteen runner field before producing a sustained run on the outside, taking the lead in the closing stages and winning by three lengths from Isla Bonita. The runner-up went on to win the Satsuki Sho and finish second in the Tokyo Yushun.

On her return from the summer break, Harp Star was made 7/10 favourite for the Grade I Hanshin Juvenile Fillies at Hanshin Racecourse on 8 December. She was again held up by Kawada before producing a late run in the straight, but failed by a nose to catch Red Reveur.

=== 2014: three-year-old season ===
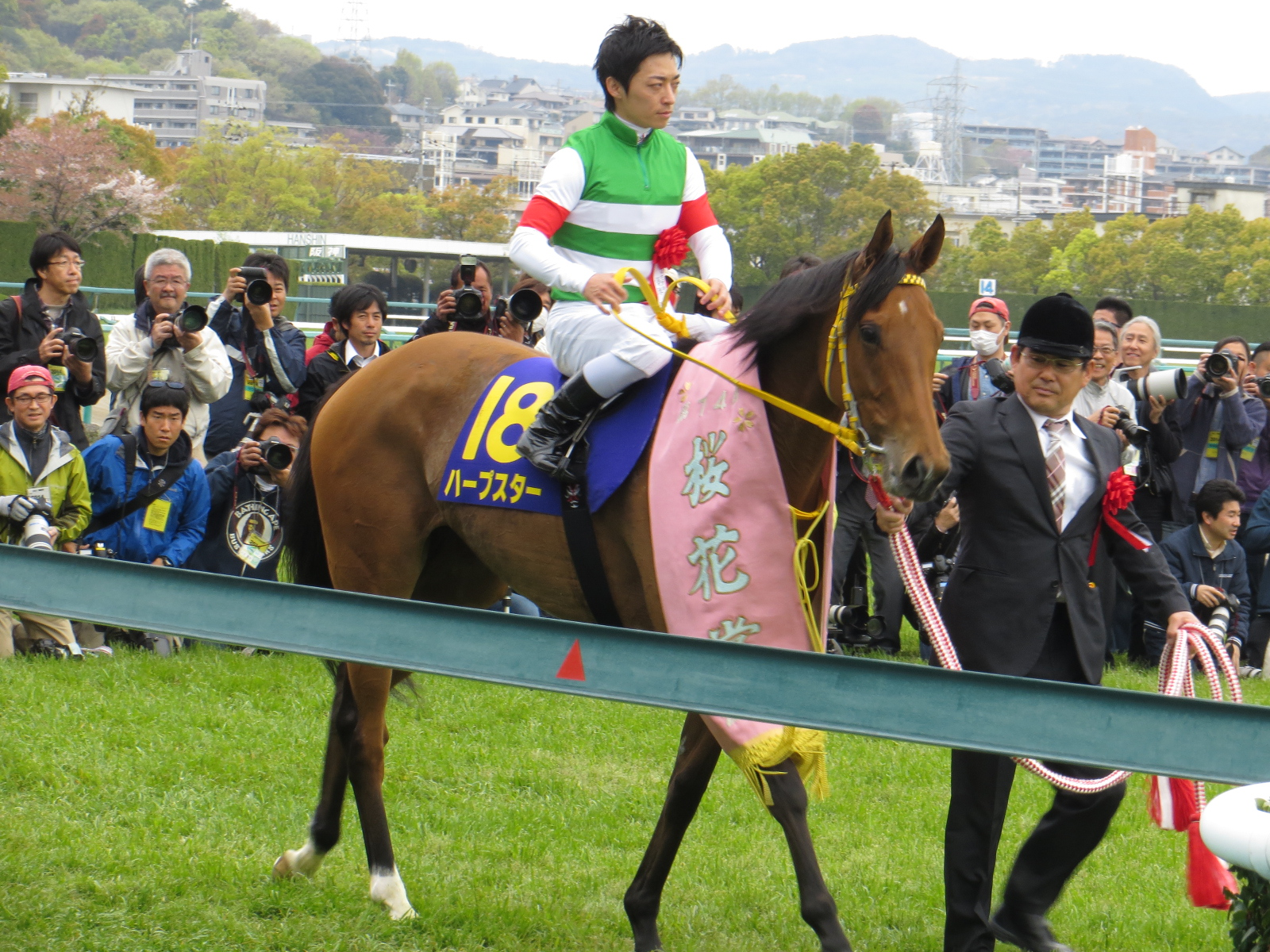
Harp Star after winning the 2014 Oka Sho.

Harp Star made her three-year-old debut in the Grade III Tulip Sho at Hanshin on 8 March in which she started the 1/10 favourite against twelve opponents and won by two and a half lengths from Nuovo Record. On 13 April, Harp Star again clashed with Red Reveur when the fillies started at 1/5 and 6.4/1 respectively in the Grade I Oka Sho over 1600 metres at Hanshin. Harp Star was last of the eighteen runners until the turn into the straight, when she produced her customary late run to take the lead in the final strides to win by a neck from Red Reveur, with Nuovo Record three quarters of a length back in third place. After the race Kawada commented "I'm relieved it all went well. We sat in our usual position and were able to race in good rhythm. I was just careful in where to launch our bid. It's as if she knew that this was a big group I race because she gave it her best. I've experienced a lot with her since her 2-year-old races so I'm just glad we were able to win today."

At Tokyo Racecourse on 25 May, Harp Star was made 3/10 favourite for the Yushun Himba over 2400 metres. Kawada employed the usual tactics but on the occasion they were unsuccessful as the favourite failed by a neck to overhaul Nuovo Record. On 24 August, the filly was matched against older horses for the first time in the Grade II Sapporo Kinen at Sapporo Racecourse and started the 2.7/1 second favourite behind the five-year-old Gold Ship. As usual, she was restrained at the back of the field before taking the lead in the straight and won by three quarters of a length from Gold Ship, with a gap of five lengths back to the six-year-old mare Whale Capture.

In autumn, Harp Star was sent to Europe to contest the Prix de l'Arc de Triomphe as part of a three horse Japanese challenge which also included Gold Ship and Just A Way. She raced at the back of the twenty-runner field for most of the way before moving to the outside to make her challenge in the straight. She made rapid progress in the last 400 metres but appeared to have been given too much ground to make up and finished sixth of the twenty runners, three and a half lengths behind the winner Treve. On her return to Japan, Harp Star started second favourite behind Gentildonna for the Japan Cup on 30 November. She stayed on the wide outside in the straight but never challenged for the lead and finished fifth behind Epiphaneia, Just A Way, Spielberg and Gentildonna.

In the polling for the 2014 JRA Award, Harp Star was elected Best Three-Year-Old Filly, beating Nuovo Record by 170 votes to 112.

=== 2015: four-year-old season ===
On her first appearance of 2015, Harp Star started 4/5 favourite for the Kyoto Kinen on 15 February but finished fifth of the eleven runners behind Lovely Day. She was then sent to the United Arab Emirates to contest the Sheema Classic at Meydan Racecourse on 28 March. Ridden by Ryan Moore, Harp Star started favourite but never looked likely to win and finished eighth of the nine runners behind Dolniya.

After returning to Japan, she was being considered to run in the Victoria Mile of that year, but was decided not to as she was deemed "still tired" as of April 2015, and instead was decided to take the rest of spring off. However, during her break she was discovered to also have sesamoid ligamentitis as well as damage to her fetlock, leading Carrot Club to announce her retirement on May 7, 2015.

== Racing form ==
Harp Star won five races and placed second twice out of 11 starts. This data is based on JBIS, netkeiba, and racingpost.

Date	Track	Race	Grade	Distance (Condition)	Entry	HN	Odds (Favored)	Finish	Time	Margins	Jockey	Winner (Runner-up)
2013 – two-year-old season
Jul 14	Chukyo	2yo Newcomer		1,400 m (Firm)	10	10	1.8 (1)	1st	1:24.5	–0.3	Yuga Kawada	(Ono Michi)
Aug 25	Niigata	Niigata Nisai Stakes	3	1,600 m (Firm)	18	17	2.6 (1)	1st	1:34.5	–0.5	Yuga Kawada	(Isla Bonita)
Dec 8	Hanshin	Hanshin Juvenile Fillies	1	1,600 m (Firm)	18	10	1.7 (1)	2nd	1:33.9	0.0	Yuga Kawada	Red Reveur
2014 – three-year-old season
Mar 8	Hanshin	Tulip Sho	3	1,600 m (Firm)	13	3	1.1 (1)	1st	1:34.3	–0.4	Yuga Kawada	(Nuovo Record)
Apr 13	Hanshin	Oka Sho	1	1,600 m (Firm)	18	18	1.2 (1)	1st	1:33.3	0.0	Yuga Kawada	(Red Reveur)
May 25	Tokyo	Yushun Himba	1	2,400 m (Firm)	18	10	1.3 (1)	2nd	2:25.8	0.0	Yuga Kawada	Nuovo Record
Aug 24	Sapporo	Sapporo Kinen	2	2,000 m (Firm)	14	8	3.7 (2)	1st	1:59.1	–0.1	Yuga Kawada	(Gold Ship)
Oct 5	Longchamp	Prix de l'Arc de Triomphe	1	2,400 m (Firm)	20	19	8/1 (4)	6th	2:27.0	0.9	Yuga Kawada	Treve
Nov 30	Tokyo	Japan Cup	1	2,400 m (Firm)	18	6	4.1 (2)	5th	2:24.0	0.9	Yuga Kawada	Epiphaneia
2015 – four-year-old season
Feb 15	Kyoto	Kyoto Kinen	2	2,200 m (Firm)	11	8	1.8 (1)	5th	2:11.9	0.4	Yuga Kawada	Lovely Day
Mar 28	Meydan	Dubai Sheema Classic	1	2,410 m (Firm)	9	9	11/4 (1)	8th	2:30.1	1.8	Ryan Moore	Dolniya

Legend:
Turf

== Breeding career ==
Following her retirement from racing, she was sent to Northern Farm to breed as a broodmare. As of October 2023, she has foaled a mare named Astraea by King Kamehameha in 2016, a colt named Lyra Star by Lord Kanaloa in 2019, and an unnamed colt by Saturnalia in 2022.

== Pedigree ==
Pedigree of Harp Star (JPN), bay filly, 2011
Sire Deep Impact (JPN) 2002	Sunday Silence (USA); 1986	Halo	Hail to Reason
Sire Deep Impact (JPN) 2002	Sunday Silence (USA); 1986	Halo	Cosmah
Sire Deep Impact (JPN) 2002	Sunday Silence (USA); 1986	Wishing Well	Understanding
Sire Deep Impact (JPN) 2002	Sunday Silence (USA); 1986	Wishing Well	Mountain Flower
Sire Deep Impact (JPN) 2002	Wind in Her Hair (IRE); 1991	Alzao	Lyphard
Sire Deep Impact (JPN) 2002	Wind in Her Hair (IRE); 1991	Alzao	Lady Rebecca
Sire Deep Impact (JPN) 2002	Wind in Her Hair (IRE); 1991	Burghclere	Busted
Sire Deep Impact (JPN) 2002	Wind in Her Hair (IRE); 1991	Burghclere	Highclere
Dam Historic Star (JPN) 2005	Falbrav (IRE); 1998	Fairy King	Northern Dancer
Dam Historic Star (JPN) 2005	Falbrav (IRE); 1998	Fairy King	Fairy Bridge
Dam Historic Star (JPN) 2005	Falbrav (IRE); 1998	Gift of the Night	Slewpy
Dam Historic Star (JPN) 2005	Falbrav (IRE); 1998	Gift of the Night	Little Nana
Dam Historic Star (JPN) 2005	Vega (JPN); 1990	Tony Bin	Kampala
Dam Historic Star (JPN) 2005	Vega (JPN); 1990	Tony Bin	Severn Bridge
Dam Historic Star (JPN) 2005	Vega (JPN); 1990	Antique Value	Northern Dancer
Dam Historic Star (JPN) 2005	Vega (JPN); 1990	Antique Value	Moonscape (Family: 9-f)

- Harp Star is inbred 4 × 4 to Northern Dancer, meaning that this stallion appears twice in the fourth generation on her pedigree.
