= Shahryar (horse) =

Japanese-bred Thoroughbred racehorse

Shahryar シャフリヤール
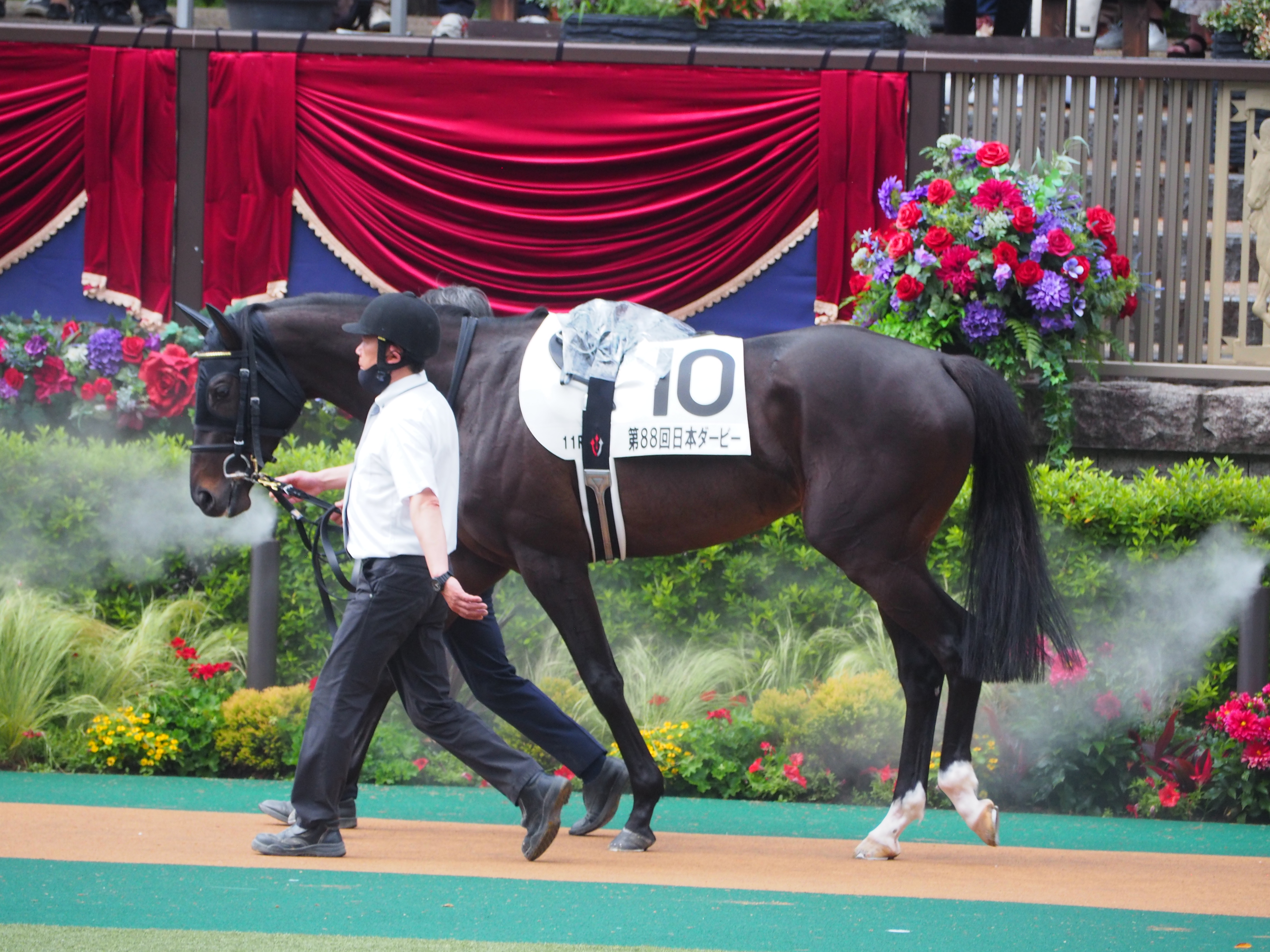
- Shahryar at the Tokyo Yushun
- Breed: Thoroughbred
- Sire: Deep Impact
- Grandsire: Sunday Silence
- Dam: Dubai Majesty
- Damsire: Essence of Dubai
- Sex: Colt
- Foaled: 13 April 2018
- Country: Japan
- Colour: Brown
- Breeder: Northern Farm
- Owner: Sunday Racing Co Ltd
- Racing colours
- Trainer: Hideaki Fujiwara
- Jockey: Cristian Demuro; Yuichi Fukunaga
- Record: 18: 4-3-4
- Earnings: 1,518,459,600 JPY (Note: Earnings earned overseas are converted to JPY using the formula provided by JRA.); Japan : 797,819,000 JPY; UAE : 4,860,000 USD; UK : 53,600 GBP; USA : 810,000 USD

Major wins
- Mainichi Hai (2021); Dubai Sheema Classic (2022); Japanese Classic Race wins: Tokyo Yushun (2021)

Shahryar (Japanese: シャフリヤール, Hepburn: Shafuriyāru; foaled 13 April 2018) is a retired Japanese Thoroughbred racehorse and a current stud. He won his only start as a juvenile in 2020 and made rapid improvement in the following spring as he ran third in the Tokinominoru Kinen before taking the Mainichi Hai and Tokyo Yushun.

== Background ==
Shahryar is a dark bay or brown horse with a white star and white socks on his hind legs bred in Japan by Northern Farm. The horse entered the ownership of the Northern Farm associate Sunday Racing and was sent into training with Hideaki Fujiwara. He is not a large horse by Thoroughbred standards, weighing around 450 kg. He usually races in a hood.

He was from the eleventh crop of foals sired by Deep Impact, who was the Japanese Horse of the Year in 2005 and 2006, winning races including the Tokyo Yushun, Tenno Sho, Arima Kinen and Japan Cup. Deep Impact's other progeny include Gentildonna, Harp Star, Kizuna, A Shin Hikari, Marialite and Saxon Warrior. Shahryar's dam Dubai Majesty was a top class performer on dirt in the United States, recording her biggest win when taking the Breeders' Cup Filly & Mare Sprint as a five-year-old in 2010. Two days after her Breeders' Cup win the mare was put up for auction at the Fasig-Tipton Kentucky November select breeding stock sale and bought for $1,100,000 by Northern Farm's Katsumi Yoshida. She was a descendant of the Virginia-bred mare Knight's Gal who was the female-line ancestor of many good winners including Palace Malice and Mutafaweq. The mare had previously produced Sharyar's full-brother Al Ain.

== Racing career ==
=== 2020: two-year-old season ===
On his first and only start as a juvenile, Shahryar started the 1.3/1 favourite for a newcomers' race over 1800 metres on firm ground at Kyoto Racecourse on 25 October. Ridden by Yuichi Fukunaga he turned into the straight in fourth place before finishing strongly to win by a neck from Vivant, with four lengths back to Sunrise Golazo in third place.

=== 2021: three-year-old season ===
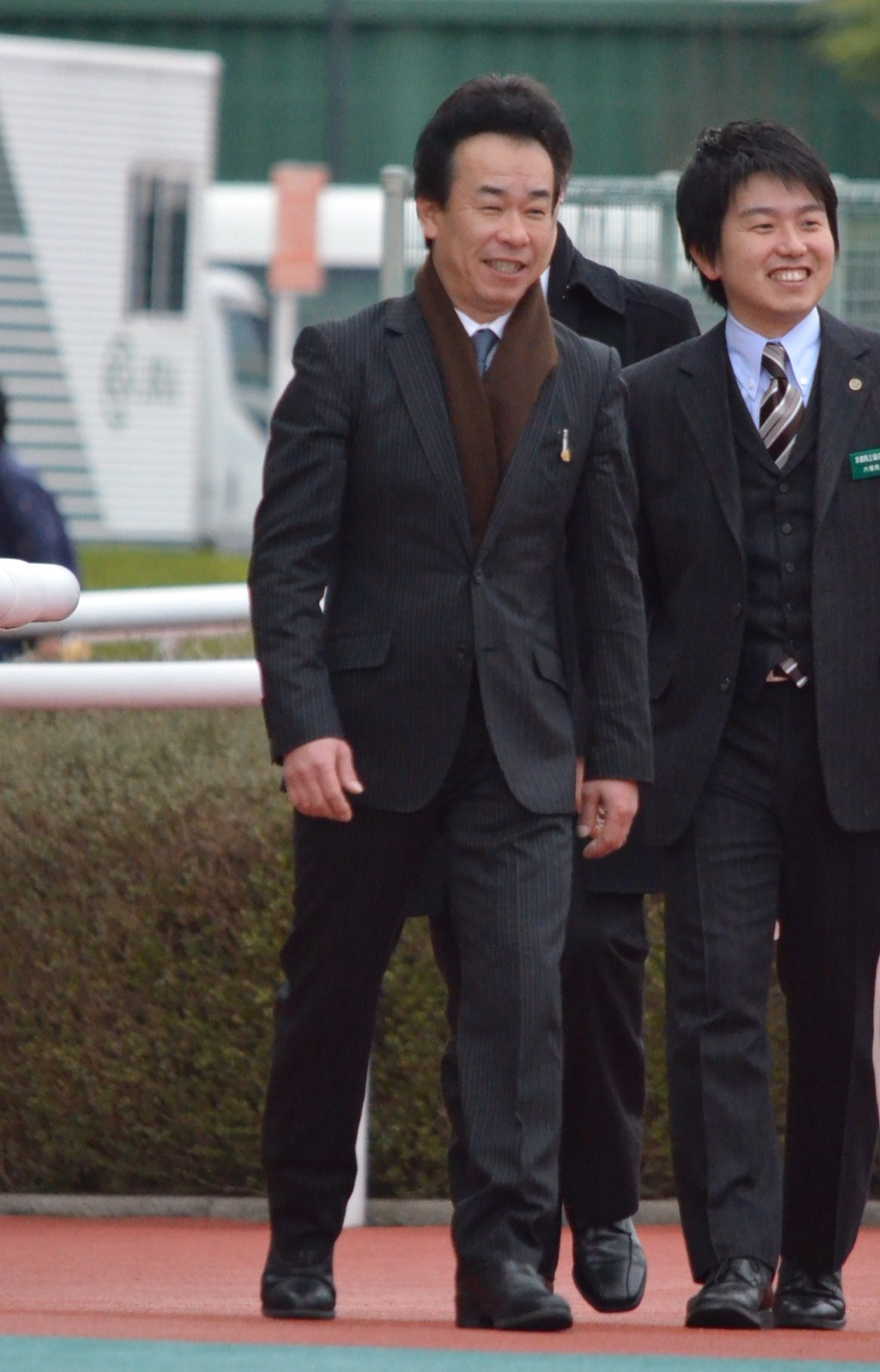
Shahryar's trainer Hideaki Fujiwara

For his first run as a three-year-old, Shahryar was partnered by Fukunaga when he was stepped up in class to contest the Grade 3 Tokinominoru Kinen on 14 February over 1800 metres at Tokyo Racecourse. Starting the 3.9/1 second favourite he finished strongly but never looked likely to win and came home third behind Efforia and Victipharus. On 27 March at Hanshin Racecourse, the colt started second favourite behind Great Magician for the Grade 3 Mainichi Hai in which he was ridden by Yuga Kawada. After settling in fifth place he made progress to take the lead in the straight and held off a strong challenge from Great Magician to win by a neck in a race record time of 1:43.9. Commenting on the race some time later Shahryar's assistant trainer Nobuyuki Tashiro stated: "It was a good win, with a very fast time, showing how good his reactions are. It became clear that a run in the Derby would be his next target."

On 30 May at Tokyo Shahryar was reunited with Fukunaga when he was one of seventeen three-year-olds to contest the 88th running of the Tokyo Yushun over 2400 metres. In the build-up to the race Hideaki Fujiwara said "He’s developing really nicely, and everything’s gone as I would have expected with him... He's an easy horse to ride and there’s no doubt he has ability. The jockey feels good about what the horse has done in training, including his usual work uphill. The 2,400 meters at Tokyo will be good for him." He went off the 10.7/1 fourth choice in the betting behind Efforia, the filly Satono Reinas (runner-up in the Oka Sho) and Great Magician while the other contenders included Wonderful Town (winner of the Aoba Sho), Titleholder (Yayoi Sho), Stella Veloce (Saudi Arabia Royal Cup), Gratias (Keisei Stakes), Bathrat Leon (New Zealand Trophy), Red Genesis (Kyoto Shimbun Hai), Victipharus (Spring Stakes) and Lagom (Kisaragi Sho). Fukunaga settled his mount in mid-division on the inside as Bathrat Leon set a steady pace from Titleholder and entered the straight in eleventh place. Satono Reinas gained the advantage in the straight before giving way to Efforia but Shahryar, having struggled to obtain a clear run began to make rapid progress. He moved up to challenge the favourite in the final strides and prevailed by a nose in a record time of 2:22.5. After the race Fukunaga said "It's so great to have won the Derby which I had made it my target with this colt ever since his debut. We were keeping an eye on the race favorite but the race didn’t go as smoothly as planned and we were in a tight spot so we were forced to make our charge late, but this colt really gave a terrific effort."

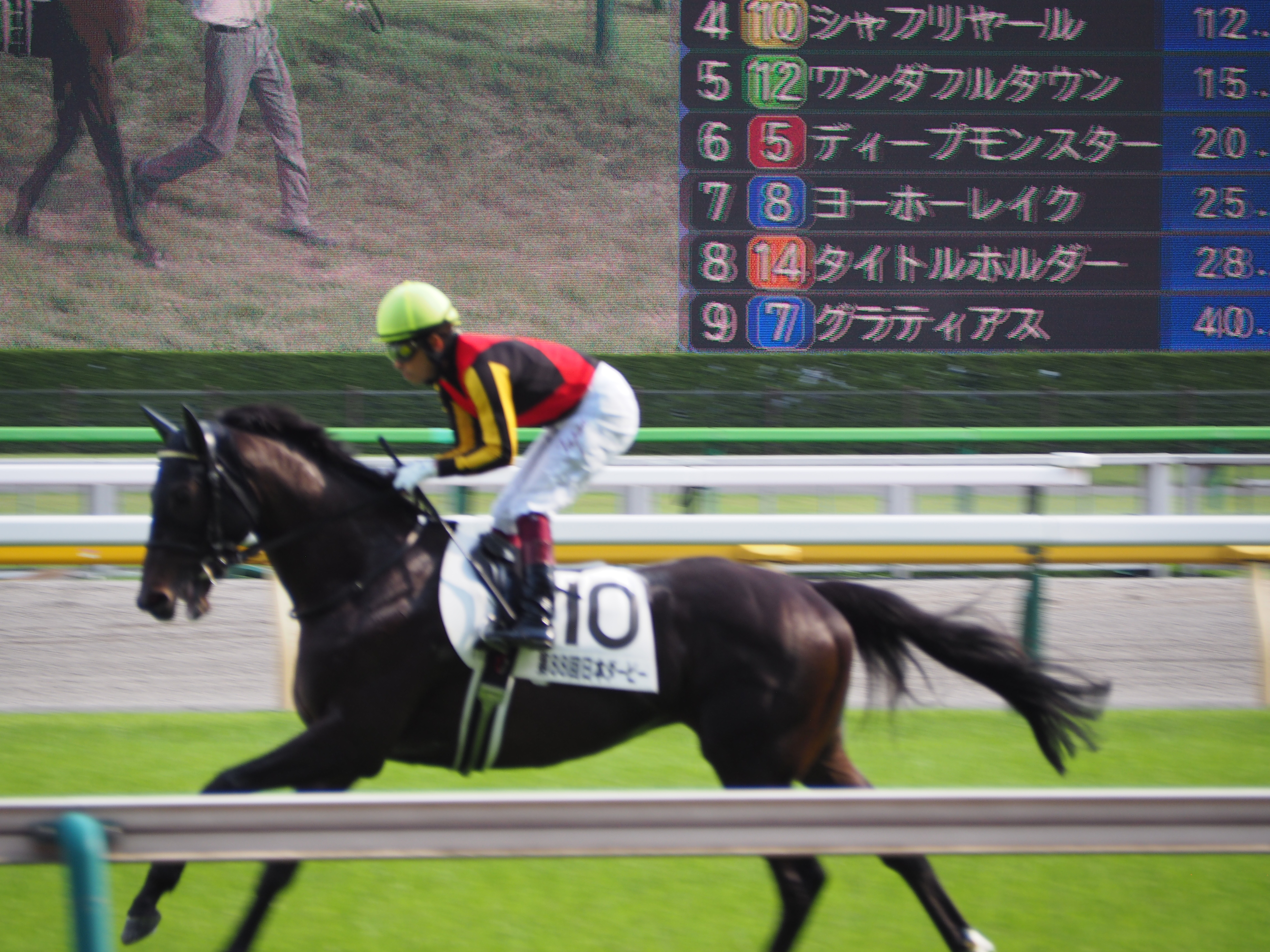
Shahryar at the 2021 Tokyo Yushun

He was then rested in the summer and prepared for the next race at the Kobe Shimbun Hai which was held in at Chukyo instead of Kyoto due to the latter ongoing renovation. He was the favourite horse to win but due to wet tracks on the rainy conditions, he was unable to unleash his finishing sprint to the line and finished in fourth that day. His jockey, Fukunaga stated that "Perhaps due to poor grounds, Shahryar could not judge how usually he ran in the race and relied much on me to point the way. This horse might suited on the good grounds better". On November 28, he ran on the first older horses tournament which was the Japan Cup. This race would feature four Tokyo Yushun's winners in one race which Makahiki (2016), Wagnerian (2018), the 2020s triple crown winner, Contrail and himself in 2021. He put himself on the chasing group as the race progress but Contrail managed to surpass him after the fourth corner and caught up to Authority 100 meters before the line to win his final race whilst Shahryar himself ended up in third one and half-lengths behind Authority. Fujiwara was satisfied with the two autumn races result and planned to send him to the next years Dubai Sheema Classic where he thought that 2400 meters suited him the most.

=== 2022: four-year-old season ===
On January 28, The team decided to send him straight to the Dubai Sheema Classic. This time, he would be jockeyed by Cristian Demuro. When the race began, Authority became the early pacesetter for the race and Shahryar marked him well. The pace was moderate but enough to mess up the rhythm of Shahryar's main contender, Yibir who was the British racehorse that was famous for his end-closing surge at the 2021 Breeders' Cup Turf. Shahryar and Demuro managed to caught on Authority in the final straight and despite late charge by Yibir who was jockeyed by William Buick, Shahryar held on to win the contention by a neck. He became the fourth Japanese horse to win the Dubai Sheema Classic after Stay Gold, Heart's Cry and Gentildonna. With this win, Fujiwara aimed for the Breeders' Cup Turf and Prix de l'Arc de Triomphe glory thereafter. For his next race, Fujiwara attempted for Shahryar in the Prince of Wales's Stakes at Ascot to acclimate him towards the European environment. He will continued to be jockeyed by Demuro for this race. He raced pretty well in second most of the race but lost out two places in the final furlong and finished in fourth-place.

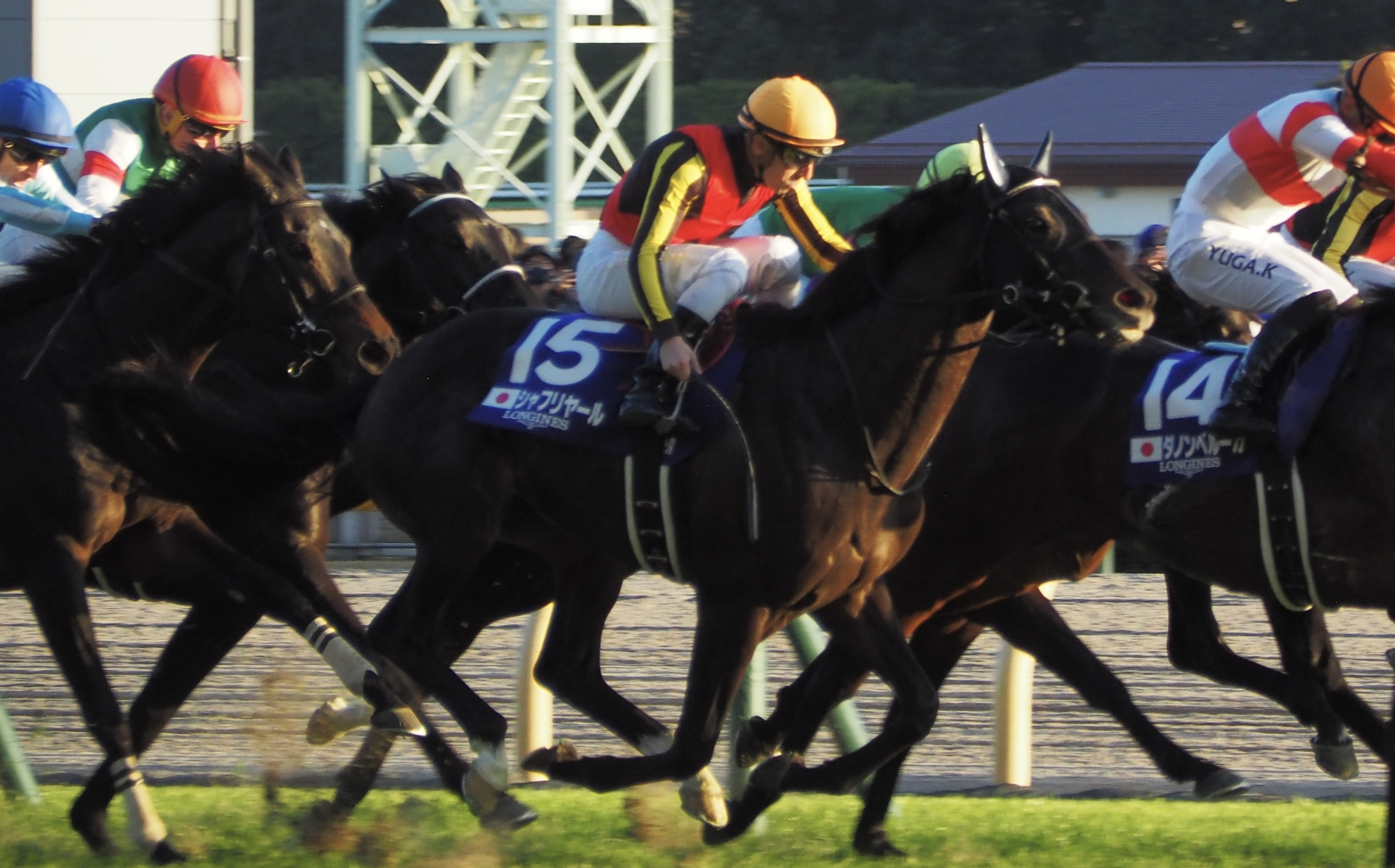
Shahryar at the 2022 Japan Cup

The plan for the Arc was cancelled as he returned and he would compete in the Tenno Sho (Autumn) in the second half of the season. The preparation for him for this race was immaculate as Fujiwara claimed that Shahryar had recovered on both his mental and physical health and he was in sync with his body control when running.. When the race began, Panthalassa made a huge runaway start which expanded to fifteen lengths at one point. Shahryar got a good start but failed to accelerate at the final straight and finished in fifth. Equinox won that race when he just merely caught Panthalassa at the final stride. Demuro commented that Shahryar was a bit sloppy and hoped that he will be better in the next race. To close out the season, Shahryar ran in the Japan Cup for the second time. He started at the rearward position from stall fifteen. When he found a clear path out two furlongs into the race, he surged past Danon Beluga and Weltreisende for the lead but lost out to the dirt-specialist horse, Vela Azul to the line by three-quarters-of-a-length behind in second place. Fujiwara stated that "Shahryar race worth 100 points, but the winning horse scores 120 points today". Demuro also got a suspension after the race from December 10 until December 18 when Shahryar was deemed to move inside and block Danon Beluga's path.

=== 2023: five-year-old season ===
Just like the previous year, he started the year by trying to defend his title in the Dubai Sheema Classic which will pinned him against the last year Arima Kinen winner, Equinox. The later then decided to went wire-to-wire and became the winner of the race whilst Shahryar finished in fifth place, unable to repeat. Demuro who continued to became his jockey, stated that Shahryar got a slow start, stuck in the rear pack and failed to execute the late spurt like the previous year. He then got rested in the summer and return for the Sapporo Kinen where he ended up in 11th-place, the worst finish he had since his debut. Turned out he was injured during the race when he was diagnosed with the epiglottis entrapment in the post-race examination.

This injury put his status as the runner in the Breeders' Cup Turf in doubt but he recovered on time just as Demuro back to jockeying him in the race. He had a good start, chased the pack in the mid race and sprinted at the home stretch but did not acquired enough pace to catch the winner, Auguste Rodin and finished in third place. The next race for him in that campaign should be the Hong Kong Vase but it was terminated due to Shahryar being suspected to have arrythmia three days before the race. So, the team opted him for the Arima Kinen this year with a new jockey, Kohei Matsuyama. In the race, Shahryar and Kohei stayed inside mostly at the fourth position. They gradually closed into the lead near the finish line but did not have enough and finished the race in fifth place, one and half-length behind the winner, Do Deuce.

=== 2024: six-year-old season ===
For the third consecutive years in a row, Shahryar would race in the Dubai Sheema Classic for his season opening. Demuro who were back to jockey Shahryar could not got a second win in this competition and finished in second place two lengths behind the winner, Rebel's Romance but managed to place in front of the 2023 Japanese Triple Tiara winner, Liberty Island. Demuro quoted, "I wanted to race from second or third position, but unfortunately wasn't able to travel well in that position. He had the bit in his teeth at times but was able to keep abreast of the eventual winner, who was racing in second position. In the final staged he lugged out to the left, but he really made a brave run." He returned to Japan, had a rest and prepared for the race he botched last season which was the Sapporo Kinen. With Yutaka Take on the reins, Shahryar only placed in fifth as he couldn't made a move smoothly in between the third and fourth corner for the late acceleration trigger as he used to.

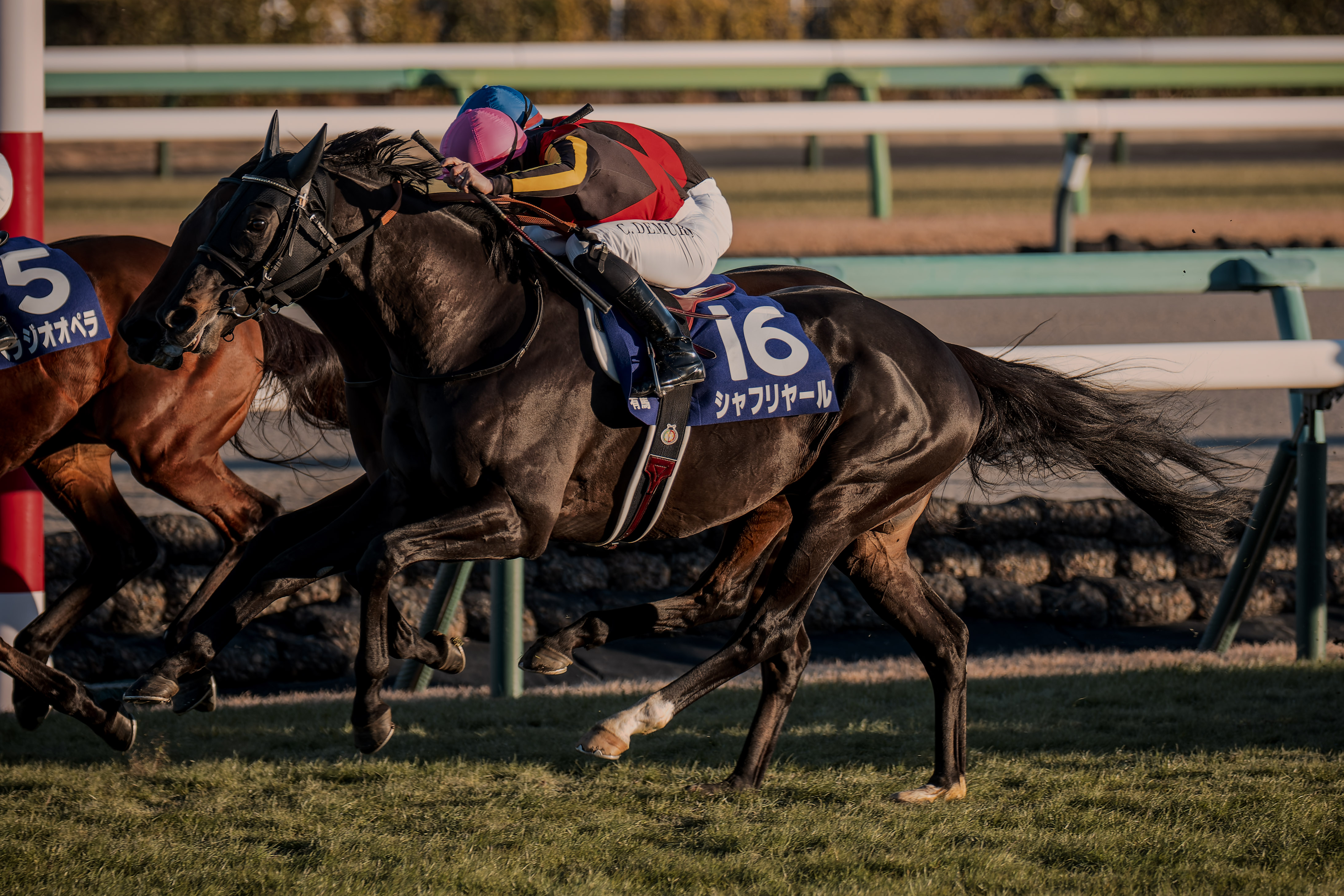
Shahryar at the 2024 Arima Kinen

For the second half of 2024, he made another attempt in the Breeders' Cup Turf. This time, he saved his energy in the middle of the race. Then, he moved on the outside track to unleash his final burst but only scored third place, losing to Rebel's Romance again for the second time in a year. For the second succeeding year, Shahryar being chosen to run in the Arima Kinen. Fujiwara said that this Arima Kinen will act as a redemption race for him as his previous performance here was not showing his full capabilities due to last minute preparation as he was forbid to run in the Hong Kong Vase. Starting from the outside gate, Demuro calmed him down on the middle pack and waited for the right time to strike. Along the race, both Bellagio Opera and Danon Decile were fighting toe-to-toe at the front. Shahryar and Regaleira then made a sharp burst in the straight end and having a duel to the line in which Regaleira came out with the win only by a nose against Shahryar.

This would be his last race as he retired as race horse and being assigned to stud duty at Shadai Stallion Station in Abira, Hokkaido. He left the Ritto Training Centre on December 26, escorted by his jockey in the Tokyo Yushun who became a trainer, Yuichi Fukunaga. At the end of his tenure, Fujiwara reminisced, "He has achieved a lot over a long period, building a strong resume and reaching the wonderful destination of becoming a stallion. Success as a sire isn't just about pedigree, it also requires great mental fortitude. Shahryar possesses exceptional overall ability, and on top of that, his mental strength is extraordinary. I'm confident he will produce outstanding offspring.

== Racing form ==
Shahryar won four races and placed in seven out of 18 starts. The data is available from JBIS, netkeiba, racingpost, Emirates Racing Authority (ERA) and Breeders Cup.

Date	Racecourse	Race	Grade	Distance (condition)	Entry	HN	Odds (Favored)	Finish	Time	Margins	Jockey	Winner (Runner-up)
2020 – two-year-old season
Oct 25	Kyoto	2yo Newcomer		1,800 m (Firm)	18	13	2.3 (1)	1st	1:49.9	0.0	Yuichi Fukunaga	(Vivant)
2021 – three-year-old season
Feb 14	Tokyo	Kyodo Tsushin Hai	3	1,800 m (Firm)	12	11	4.9 (2)	3rd	1:48.0	0.4	Yuichi Fukunaga	Efforia
Mar 27	Hanshin	Mainichi Hai	3	1,800 m (Firm)	9	6	2.9 (2)	1st	R1:43.9	0.0	Yuga Kawada	(Great Magician)
May 30	Tokyo	Tokyo Yushun	1	2,400 m (Firm)	17	10	11.7 (4)	1st	R2:22.5	0.0	Yuichi Fukunaga	(Efforia)
Sep 26	Chukyo	Kobe Shimbun Hai	2	2,200 m (Heavy)	10	10	1.8 (1)	4th	2:18.7	0.7	Yuichi Fukunaga	Stella Veloce
Nov 28	Tokyo	Japan Cup	1	2,400 m (Firm)	18	4	3.7 (2)	3rd	2:25.2	0.5	Yuga Kawada	Contrail
2022 – four-year-old season
Mar 26	Meydan	Dubai Sheema Classic	1	2,410 m (Firm)	15	12	5.9 (4)	1st	2:26.9	0.0	Cristian Demuro	(Yibir)
Jun 15	Ascot	Prince of Wales's Stakes	1	10 f (Firm)	5	3	3.1 (2)	4th	2:08.5	0.7	Cristian Demuro	State of Rest
Oct 30	Tokyo	Tenno Sho (Autumn)	1	2,000 m (Firm)	15	8	4.4 (2)	5th	1:58.1	0.6	Cristian Demuro	Equinox
Nov 27	Tokyo	Japan Cup	1	2,400 m (Firm)	18	15	3.4 (1)	2nd	2:23.8	0.1	Cristian Demuro	Vela Azul
2023 – five-year-old season
Mar 25	Meydan	Dubai Sheema Classic	1	2,410 m (Firm)	10	6	6.9 (3)	5th	2:27.3	1.6	Cristian Demuro	Equinox
Aug 20	Sapporo	Sapporo Kinen	2	2,000 m (Good)	15	4	9.1 (5)	11th	2:04.8	3.3	Takeshi Yokoyama	Prognosis
Nov 4	Santa Anita	Breeders' Cup Turf	1	1 1/2 miles (Firm)	11	1	8.5 (5)	3rd	2:24.5	0.2	Cristian Demuro	Auguste Rodin
Dec 24	Nakayama	Arima Kinen	1	2,500 m (Firm)	16	2	44.6 (8)	5th	2:31.2	0.3	Kohei Matsuyama	Do Deuce
2024 – six-year-old season
Mar 30	Meydan	Dubai Sheema Classic	1	2,410 m (Firm)	12	5	21.2 (6)	2nd	2:27.0	0.3	Cristian Demuro	Rebel's Romance
Aug 18	Sapporo	Sapporo Kinen	2	2,000 m (Firm)	11	4	7.6 (2)	5th	2:00.2	0.6	Yutaka Take	North Bridge
Nov 2	Del Mar	Breeders' Cup Turf	1	1 1/2 miles (Firm)	13	3	6.7 (3)	3rd	2:26.4	0.3	Cristian Demuro	Rebel's Romance
Dec 22	Nakayama	Arima Kinen	1	2,500 m (Firm)	15	16	30.1 (10)	2nd	2:31.8	0.0	Cristian Demuro	Regaleira

Legend:
Turf

- R indicated that it was a record time finish

== Pedigree ==
Pedigree of Shahryar (JPN), brown colt 2018
Sire Deep Impact (JPN) 2002	Sunday Silence (USA); 1986	Halo	Hail to Reason
Sire Deep Impact (JPN) 2002	Sunday Silence (USA); 1986	Halo	Cosmah
Sire Deep Impact (JPN) 2002	Sunday Silence (USA); 1986	Wishing Well	Understanding
Sire Deep Impact (JPN) 2002	Sunday Silence (USA); 1986	Wishing Well	Mountain Flower
Sire Deep Impact (JPN) 2002	Wind in Her Hair (IRE); 1991	Alzao (USA)	Lyphard
Sire Deep Impact (JPN) 2002	Wind in Her Hair (IRE); 1991	Alzao (USA)	Lady Rebecca (GB)
Sire Deep Impact (JPN) 2002	Wind in Her Hair (IRE); 1991	Burghclere (GB)	Busted
Sire Deep Impact (JPN) 2002	Wind in Her Hair (IRE); 1991	Burghclere (GB)	Highclere
Dam Dubai Majesty (USA) 2005	Essence of Dubai (USA); 1999	Pulpit	A.P. Indy
Dam Dubai Majesty (USA) 2005	Essence of Dubai (USA); 1999	Pulpit	Preach
Dam Dubai Majesty (USA) 2005	Essence of Dubai (USA); 1999	Epitome	Summing
Dam Dubai Majesty (USA) 2005	Essence of Dubai (USA); 1999	Epitome	Honest And True
Dam Dubai Majesty (USA) 2005	Great Majesty (USA); 1990	Great Above	Minnesota Mac
Dam Dubai Majesty (USA) 2005	Great Majesty (USA); 1990	Great Above	Ta Wee
Dam Dubai Majesty (USA) 2005	Great Majesty (USA); 1990	Mistic Majesty	His Majesty
Dam Dubai Majesty (USA) 2005	Great Majesty (USA); 1990	Mistic Majesty	Necara's Miss (Family: 2-s)
