= Blast Onepiece =

Japanese-bred Thoroughbred racehorse

Blast Onepiece ブラストワンピース
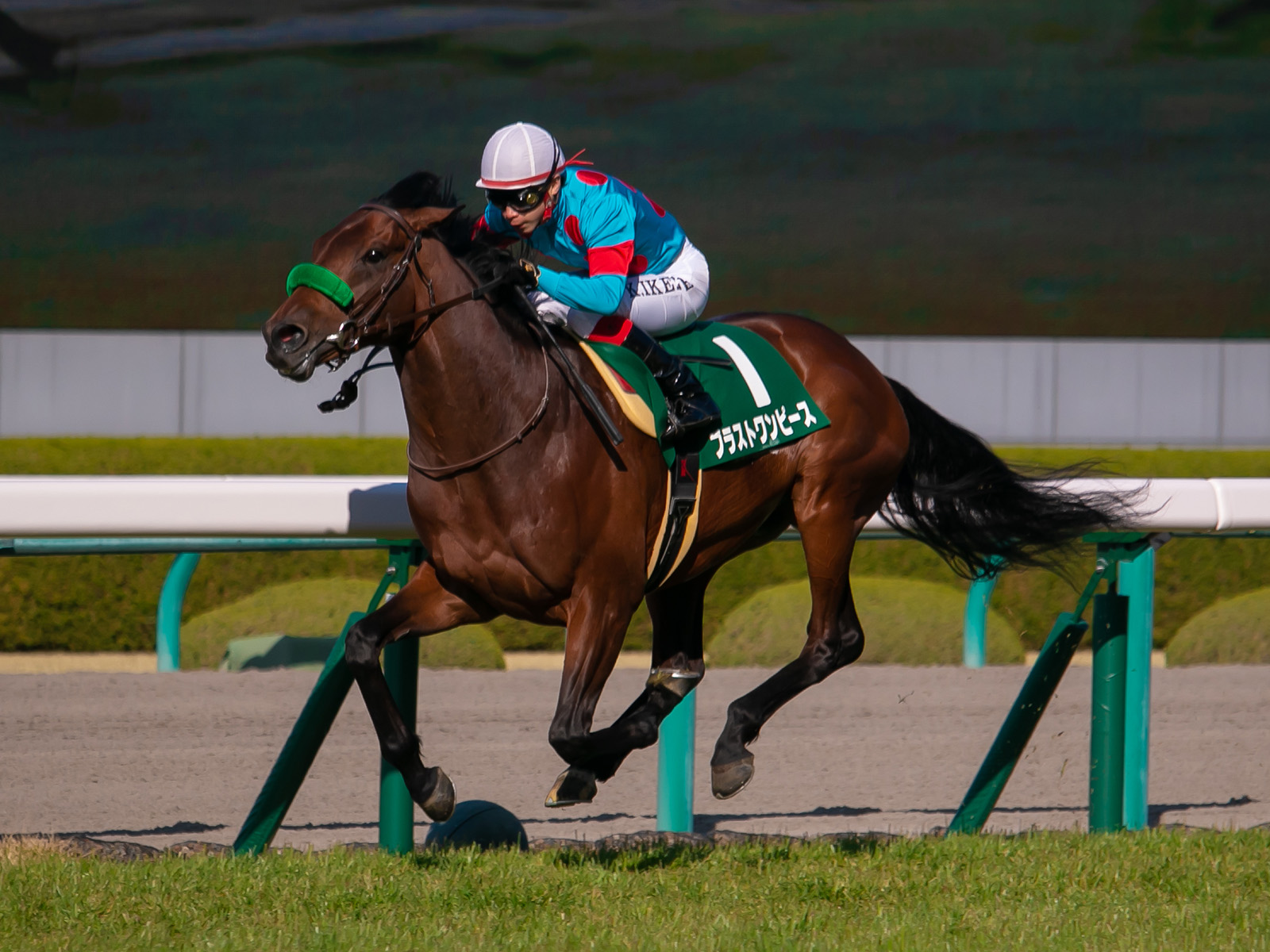
- Blast Onepiece racing at the 2018 Mainichi Hai.
- Breed: Thoroughbred
- Sire: Harbinger (GB)
- Grandsire: Dansili (GB)
- Dam: Tsurumaru Onepiece (JPN)
- Damsire: King Kamehameha (JPN)
- Sex: Stallion
- Foaled: April 2, 2015 (age 11)
- Country: Japan
- Colour: Bay
- Breeder: Northern Farm
- Owner: Silk Racing Co Ltd
- Racing colours
- Trainer: Masahiro Otake
- Jockey: Kenichi Ikezoe
- Record: 18: 7-0-1
- Earnings: ¥572,356,000

Major wins
- Mainichi Hai (2018); Niigata Kinen (2018); Arima Kinen (2018); Sapporo Kinen (2019); American Jockey Club Cup (2020)

Awards
- JRA Award for Best Three-Year-Old Colt (2018)

Blast Onepiece (Japanese: ブラストワンピース, Hepburn: Burasuto Wanpīsu; foaled 2 April 2015) is a retired Japanese Thoroughbred racehorse. After winning his only start as a two-year-old, he improved to become the best colt of his generation in Japan the following year. He recorded Grade 3 victories in the Mainichi Hai and the Niigata Kinen before ending his season with a win over a top-class field in the Arima Kinen. He won the Sapporo Kinen in 2019 and the American Jockey Club Cup in 2020.

== Background ==
Blast Onepiece is a bay horse bred in Japan by Northern Farm. During his racing career he has been owned by Silk Racing Company and trained by Masahiro Otake. He is an unusually large Thoroughbred who has weighed between 520 kg and 550 kg for his track appearances.

He was from the fourth crop of foals sired by Harbinger, a British horse who was rated the best racehorse in the world in 2010 when he won the King George VI and Queen Elizabeth Stakes by eleven lengths. Since retiring to stud in Japan his other foals have included Deirdre (Shuka Sho), Mozu Katchan (Queen Elizabeth II Cup) and Persian Knight (Mile Championship). Blast Onepiece is the first foal of his dam Tsurumaru Onepiece who showed some racing ability, winning three of her 21 races between 2010 and 2014. She was a distant descendant of the British broodmare Minaret (foaled 1948), the ancestor of many major winners including Indian Queen, See You Then and Sayyedati.

== Racing career ==
=== 2017: two-year-old season ===
Blast Onepiece made his first and only appearance as a two-year-old in a contest for unraced juveniles over 1800 metres at Tokyo Racecourse on 19 November. He won by a length from Lord da Vinci.

=== 2018: three-year-old season ===
On his 2018 debut Blast Onepiece was stepped up in distance for a minor event over 2400 metres at Tokyo on 4 February and came home three and a half lengths clear of his thirteen opponents. The colt was ridden in all of his subsequent races that year by Kenichi Ikezoe. On 24 March Blast Onepiece was stepped up in class for the Grade 3 Mainichi Hai at Hanshin Racecourse and started the 1.5/1 favourite in a field of ten. Racing on firm ground over 1800 metres he won by two lengths and a neck from Gibeon and Indy Champ. The Grade 1 Tokyo Yushun over 2400 metres at Tokyo on 27 May saw the colt start the 3.6/1 second choice in the betting behind Danon Premium in an eighteen-runner-field. The race resulted in a blanket finish with Blast Onepiece (who recovered from interference in the straight) coming home fifth behind Wagnerian, Epoca d'Oro, Cosmic Force and Etario, beaten less than a length by the winner.

After a break of over three months Blast Onepiece returned for the Grade 3 Niigata Kinen over 2000 metres at Niigata Racecourse in which he was matched against older horses for the first time. He was made the odds-on favourite ahead of thirteen opponents and won by one and three quarter lengths from the five-year-old Maitres d'Art. At Kyoto Racecourse on 21 October the colt started 2.4/1 favourite ahead of Etario and Epoca d'Oro for the Grade 1 Kikuka Sho over 3100 metres. In a slowly run race he came from well off the pace and made steady progress in the straight but failed to reach the leaders and finished fourth behind Fierement Etario and You Can Smile. Following the race Masahiro Otake said that the slow pace had not suited his trainee but pointed out that the colt had recovered very quickly from the race and was suffering less back pain than usual.

Blast Onepiece was one of sixteen horses invited to contest the 2500 metres Arima Kinen at Nakayama Racecourse on 23 December and was made the 7.9/1 third choice in the betting behind Rey de Oro and Kiseki. The other major winners in the race included Satono Diamond, Makahiki, Mozu Katchan (Queen Elizabeth II Cup), Oju Chosan (Nakayama Grand Jump), Mikki Rocket (Takarazuka Kinen) and Cheval Grand. After racing wide for most of the way, Blast Onepiece produced a sustained run in the straight, overtook the front-running Kiseki 100 metres from the finish and held off the late challenge of Rey de Oro to win by a neck. After the race Ikezoe said "I was a bit worried of being caught between horses, so I settled him toward the outside. He ran well, and though we were closed in by the race favorite at the end, he held on really well. I've been telling everyone that he is a Grade 1 horse, and I'm happy that I was able to prove it".

In January 2019 Blast Onepiece was named Best Three-Year-Old Colt at the JRA Awards for 2018 taking 114 of the 276 votes. In the 2018 World's Best Racehorse Rankings Blast Onepiece was rated the third best three-year-old colt in the world behind Roaring Lion and Justify and the twentieth best horse of any age or sex.

=== 2019: four-year-old season ===
On his first run of 2019 Blast Onepiece was made the 2.2/1 favourite for the Grade 1 Osaka Hai over 2000 metres at Hanshin on 31 March. After racing towards the rear of the field he was forced wide on the final turn and finished sixth of the fourteen runners behind Al Ain, Kiseki, Wagnerian, Makahiki and Air Windsor. The colt was dropped back to Grade 2 class for the Meguro Kinen over 2500 metres at Tokyo in May but despite starting favourite he came home eighth behind the six-year-old Look Twice. On 18 August Blast Onepiece contested the 2000 metre Sapporo Kinen and went off the 3.7/1 third choice in the betting behind Fierement and Wagnerian. Ridden by Yuga Kawada he was restrained in the early stages before staying on strongly in the straight and despite briefly struggling to obtain a clear passage he ran down Sungrazer in the final strides to win by a neck.

In the autumn of 2019 Blast Onepiece was sent to race in Europe and on 6 October he started a 58/1 outsider for the Prix de l'Arc de Triomphe over 2400. Racing on very soft ground he was never in serious contention and came home eleventh of the twelve runners behind Waldgeist.

=== 2020: five-year-old season ===
Blast Onepiece began his fourth campaign in the Grade 2 American Jockey Club Cup over 2200 metres at Nakayama on 26 January. Starting the 2/1 favourite in a twelve-runner field he settled behind the leaders as Stiffelio set the pace before moving into contention on the final turn, overtaking Stay Foolish in the last 200 metres and winning by one and a quarter lengths. On 5 April, in his second attempt to win the Osaka Hai the horse started third choice in the betting but after moving into a promising position approaching the last turn he was unable to make any progress in the straight and came home seventh, beaten just over three lengths by the winner Lucky Lilac. In the 28 June Takarazuka Kinen at Hansin, he ran poorly and finished sixteenth of the eighteen starters behind Chrono Genesis.

After the summer break, Blast Onepiece returned to the track for the autumn edition of the Tenno Sho at Tokyo on 1 November and came home eleventh behind Almond Eye, beaten more than ten lengths by the winner. He ended his season by attempting to repeat his 2018 success in the Arima Kinen but after racing in second place until halfway he began to struggle badly and was pulled up after reportedly suffering from atrial fibrillation.

=== 2021: six-year-old season ===
He recuperated well and return on the Naruo Kinen in June. Otake noted that Blast Onepiece early training caused him difficulties in breathing but it went better as the days past where his breathing return to normal in the ECG test. His performance on the race was very promising as he finished in third place three quarters of a length behind the winner, Unicorn Lion. Otake said despite the slow pace for the overall pack, Blast Onepiece responded well and took advantage on his position during the race.

The next race he ran in would be the Sapporo Kinen. He would be ridden with the same jockey back in Naruo Kinen which was Yasunari Iwata. In this race, Blast Onepiece stayed behind at the earlier phase. Then, he accelerate to the front on the 1000 metres mark. He also transitioned to the outside track at the third corner in order to surpass the leading pack. Unfortunately, Sodashi matched his pace and over took him for the lead and won the race. Meanwhile, Blast Onepiece gassed out, slowed down in the final straight and finished in fifth-place.

This race turned out to be his last career race as he suffered an injury to his right front fetlock. He retired from racing and assigned to be a riding horse at the Northern Horse Park in Tomakomai, Hokkaido. Blast Onepiece became the first Arima Kinen's stallion that did not went to a stud duty since his sire, Harbinger is still in high-demand in that area (with the slight exception of Ten Point who succumbed to his injuries). His main jockey, Ikezoe blamed himself in his inability to carry him for more titles than the Arima Kinen which caused him unable to be a stud.

== Racing form ==
Blast Onepiece won seven races in 18 starts. This data is based on JBIS, netkeiba and racingpost.

Date	Track	Race	Grade	Distance (Condition)	Entry	HN	Odds (Favored)	Finish	Time	Margins	Jockey	Winner (Runner-up)
2017 – two-year-old season
Nov 17	Tokyo	2yo Newcomer		1,800 m (Firm)	14	7	12.2 (5)	1st	1:51.4	–0.2	Kenichi Ikezoe	(Lord Da Vinci)
2018 – three-year-old season
Feb 4	Tokyo	Yurikamome Sho	ALW (1W)	2,400 m (Good)	14	12	3.3 (2)	1st	2:27.6	–0.7	Kenichi Ikezoe	(Drake)
Mar 24	Hanshin	Mainichi Hai	3	1,800 m (Firm)	10	1	2.5 (1)	1st	1:46.5	–0.3	Kenichi Ikezoe	(Gibeon)
May 27	Tokyo	Tokyo Yushun	1	2,400 m (Firm)	18	8	4.6 (2)	5th	2:23.8	0.2	Kenichi Ikezoe	Wagnerian
Sep 2	Niigata	Niigata Kinen	3	2,000 m (Firm)	13	1	1.8 (1)	1st	1:57.5	–0.3	Kenichi Ikezoe	(Maitres d'Art)
Oct 21	Kyoto	Kikuka Sho	1	3,000 m (Firm)	18	3	3.4 (1)	4th	3:06.5	0.4	Kenichi Ikezoe	Fierement
Dec 23	Nakayama	Arima Kinen	1	2,500 m (Good)	16	8	8.9 (3)	1st	2:32.2	0.0	Kenichi Ikezoe	(Rey de Oro)
2019 – four-year-old season
Mar 31	Hanshin	Osaka Hai	1	2,000 m (Firm)	14	7	3.2 (1)	6th	2:01.3	0.3	Kenichi Ikezoe	Al Ain
May 26	Tokyo	Meguro Kinen	2	2,500 m (Firm)	13	6	2.2 (1)	8th	2:29.1	0.9	Kenichi Ikezoe	Look Twice
Aug 18	Sapporo	Sapporo Kinen	2	2,000 m (Firm)	14	1	4.7 (3)	1st	2:00.1	0.0	Yuga Kawada	(Sungrazer)
Oct 6	Longchamp	Prix de l'Arc de Triomphe	1	2,400 m (Soft)	12	5	18.1 (5)	11th	2:38.6	6.6	Yuga Kawada	Waldgeist
2020 – five-year-old season
Jan 26	Tokyo	American Jockey Club Cup	2	2,200 m (Good)	12	11	3.0 (1)	1st	2:15.0	–0.2	Yuga Kawada	(Stay Foolish)
Apr 5	Hanshin	Osaka Hai	1	2,000 m (Firm)	12	3	4.3 (3)	7th	1:59.0	0.6	Yuga Kawada	Lucky Lilac
Jun 28	Hanshin	Takarazuka Kinen	1	2,200 m (Good)	18	18	9.9 (4)	16th	2:18.0	4.5	Yuga Kawada	Chrono Genesis
Nov 1	Tokyo	Tenno Sho (Autumn)	1	2,000 m (Firm)	12	1	32.3 (7)	11th	1:59.5	1.7	Kenichi Ikezoe	Almond Eye
Dec 27	Nakayama	Arima Kinen	1	2,500 m (Firm)	16	2	33.1 (9)	DNF	–	–	Takeshi Yokoyama	Chrono Genesis
2021 – six-year-old season
Jun 5	Chukyo	Naruo Kinen	3	2,000 m (Firm)	13	1	8.1 (5)	3rd	2:01.4	0.7	Yasunari Iwata	Unicorn Lion
Aug 22	Sapporo	Sapporo Kinen	2	2,000 m (Firm)	13	12	12.3 (3)	5th	2:00.0	0.5	Yasunari Iwata	Sodashi

Legend:
Turf

== In popular culture ==
An anthropomorphized version of Blast Onepiece appears as a character in the Japanese multimedia franchise Umamusume: Pretty Derby, voiced by Azusa Shizuki.

== Pedigree ==
Pedigree of Blast Onepiece (JPN), bay colt 2015
Sire Harbinger (GB) 2006	Dansili; 1996	Danehill (USA)	Danzig
Sire Harbinger (GB) 2006	Dansili; 1996	Danehill (USA)	Razyana
Sire Harbinger (GB) 2006	Dansili; 1996	Hasili (IRE)	Kahyasi
Sire Harbinger (GB) 2006	Dansili; 1996	Hasili (IRE)	Kerali (GB)
Sire Harbinger (GB) 2006	Penang Pearl (FR); 1996	Bering (GB)	Arctic Tern (USA)
Sire Harbinger (GB) 2006	Penang Pearl (FR); 1996	Bering (GB)	Beaune (FR)
Sire Harbinger (GB) 2006	Penang Pearl (FR); 1996	Guapa (GB)	Shareef Dancer (USA)
Sire Harbinger (GB) 2006	Penang Pearl (FR); 1996	Guapa (GB)	Sauceboat
Dam Tsurumaru Onepiece (JPN) 2008	King Kamehameha; 2001	Kingmambo (USA)	Mr. Prospector
Dam Tsurumaru Onepiece (JPN) 2008	King Kamehameha; 2001	Kingmambo (USA)	Miesque
Dam Tsurumaru Onepiece (JPN) 2008	King Kamehameha; 2001	Manfath (IRE)	Last Tycoon
Dam Tsurumaru Onepiece (JPN) 2008	King Kamehameha; 2001	Manfath (IRE)	Pilot Bird (GB)
Dam Tsurumaru Onepiece (JPN) 2008	Tsurumaru Glamor; 1999	Fuji Kiseki	Sunday Silence (USA)
Dam Tsurumaru Onepiece (JPN) 2008	Tsurumaru Glamor; 1999	Fuji Kiseki	Millracer (USA)
Dam Tsurumaru Onepiece (JPN) 2008	Tsurumaru Glamor; 1999	Elatis (USA)	El Gran Senor
Dam Tsurumaru Onepiece (JPN) 2008	Tsurumaru Glamor; 1999	Elatis (USA)	Summer Review (Family 9-c)
