= Mainichi Hai =

Mainichi Hai 毎日杯
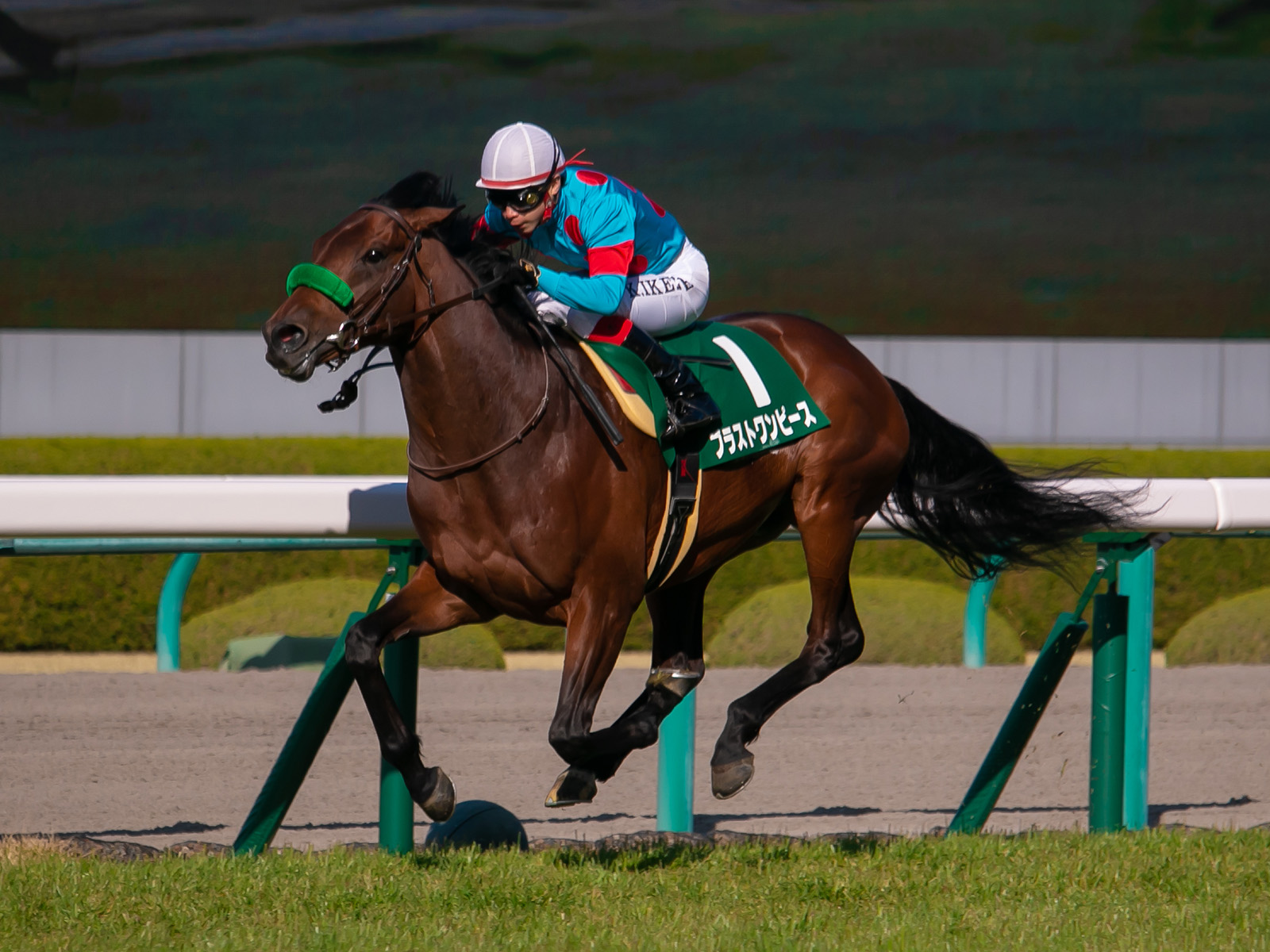
- Blast Onepiece wins the 2018 Mainichi Hai
- Class: Grade 3
- Location: Hanshin Racecourse
- Inaugurated: 1954
- Race type: Thoroughbred Flat racing

Race information
- Distance: 1800 metres
- Surface: Turf
- Track: Right-handed
- Qualification: 3-y-o
- Weight: Colts 57 kg, fillies 55 kg
- Purse: ¥ 87,960,000 (as of 2026): 1st: ¥ 41,000,000; 2nd: ¥ 16,000,000; 3rd: ¥ 10,000,000

The Mainichi Hai (Japanese 毎日杯) is a Japanese Grade 3 horse race for three-year-old Thoroughbreds run in March over a distance of 1800 metres at Hanshin Racecourse.

The race was first run in 1954 and has held Grade 3 status since 1984. It was initially run over 2000 metres before being cut to its current distance in 2007. Past winners of the race have included Oguri Cap, T. M. Opera O, King Kamehameha, Kizuna and Blast Onepiece.

== Winners since 2000 ==
Year	Winner	Jockey	Trainer	Owner	Time
2000	Silver Cockpit	Yutaka Take	Takayuki Yasuda	Makoto Kaneko	2:03.6
2001	Kurofune	Hirofumi Shii	Kunihide Matsuda	Makoto Kaneko	1:58.6
2002	Cheers Stark	Shinji Fujita	Kenji Yamauchi	Kiyoko Kitamura	2:02.2
2003	Takara Shaadi	Tetsuzo Sato	Shozo Sasaki	Akitsugu Ito	1:59.9
2004	King Kamehameha	Yuichi Fukunaga	Kunihide Matsuda	Makoto Kaneko	2:01.2
2005	Rosenkreuz	Katsumi Ando	Kojiro Hashiguchi	Sunday Racing	2:02.2
2006	Admire Main	Yuichi Fukunaga	Mitsuru Hashida	Riichi Kondo	2:00.5
2007	Namura Mars	Yusuke Fujioka	Nobuharu Fukushima	Nobushige Namura	1:48.0
2008	Deep Sky	Hirofumi Shii	Mitsugu Kon	Toshio Fukami	1:46.0
2009	Iron Look	Futoshi Komaki	Kojiro Hashiguchi	Kazuma Ikegami	1:48.0
2010	Danon Chantilly	Katsumi Ando	Kunihide Matsuda	Danox	1:49.3
2011	Red Davis	Suguru Hamanaka	Hidetaka Otonashi	Tokyo Horse Racing	1:47.1
2012	Historical	Katsumi Ando	Hidetaka Otonashi	Hideko Kondo	1:49.6
2013	Kizuna	Yutaka Take	Shozo Sasaki	Shinji Maeda	1:46.2
2014	Meiner Frost	Daichi Shibata	Noboru Takagi	Thoroughbred Club Ruffian	1:46.7
2015	Musee Alien	Yuga Kawada	Yoichi Kuroiwa	Hitoshi Takahashi	1:47.2
2016	Smart Odin	Keita Tosaki	Kunihide Matsuda	Tohru Okawa	1:47.3
2017	Al Ain	Kohei Matsuyama	Yasutoshi Ikee	Sunday Racing	1:46.5
2018	Blast Onepiece	Kenichi Ikezoe	Masahiro Otake	Silk Racing	1:46.5
2019	Lance of Puraana	Kohei Matsuyama	Masaru Honda	Yoshinori Itsukage	1:47.2
2020	Satono Impresa	Yutaka Take	Yoshito Yahagi	Satomi Horse Company	1:47.9
2021	Shahryar	Yuga Kawada	Hideaki Fujiwara	Sunday Racing	1:43.9
2022	Piece of Eight	Yusuke Fujioka	Yutaka Okumura	Silk Racing	1:47.5
2023	Season Rich	Taiga Tsunoda	Takashi Kubota	Yutaka Uda	1:46.6
2024	Meisho Tabaru	Ryusei Sakai	Mamoru Ishibashi	Yoshio Matsumoto	1:46.0
2025	Fandom	Hiroshi Kitamura	Tetsuhide Tsuji	Carrot Farm	1:45.9
2026	Altramuz	Mirai Iwata	Kenji Nonaka	Shadai Race Horse Co.,Ltd.	1:45.1

== Earlier winners ==
- 1954 - Minemasa
- 1955 - Yasaka
- 1956 - Kiyatsusuru
- 1957 - Shin Sekaiichi
- 1958 - Takaharu
- 1959 - Hatsurai
- 1960 - Tygon O
- 1961 - Yamasakae
- 1962 - Golden Star
- 1963 - Passport
- 1964 - Onward Second
- 1965 - Tanino Rising
- 1966 - Apo Onward
- 1967 - Satohikaru
- 1968 - Date Horai
- 1969 - Masa Fighter
- 1970 - Date Tenryu
- 1971 - Nihon Pillow Moutiers
- 1972 - Yu Mond
- 1973 - Houshu Eight
- 1974 - Erimo Marchs
- 1975 - Fusatoro Quinault
- 1976 - Erimo Father
- 1977 - Hard Berge
- 1978 - Agnes Hope
- 1979 - Hashi Hermit
- 1980 - Red Jaguar
- 1981 - Hirono Wakakoma
- 1982 - Erimo Roller
- 1983 - Takeno Hien
- 1984 - Marubutsu Sir Pen
- 1985 - New Fun Fun
- 1986 - Fresh Voice
- 1987 - Daigo Alpha
- 1988 - Oguri Cap
- 1989 - Star Sunshine
- 1990 - Key Minobu
- 1991 - Iide Satan
- 1992 - Hishi Masaru
- 1993 - Cyclennon Sheriff
- 1994 - Merci Stage
- 1995 - Daitaku Teio
- 1996 - Taiki Fortune
- 1997 - T M Top Dan
- 1998 - Miracle Time
- 1999 - T. M. Opera O

== See also ==
- Horse racing in Japan
- List of Japanese flat horse races
