= Northern Farm (stud) =

Horse stud farm in Hokkaido, Japan

Northern Farm ノーザンファーム
- Interactive map of Northern Farm ノーザンファーム
- Town/City: 275 Hayakitagembu, Yufutsu-gun Abira-cho
- Prefecture: Hokkaido
- Country: Japan
- Coordinates: 42°42′56.2″N 141°49′27.6″E
- Established: 1994
- Owner: Katsumi Yoshida
- Produces: Thoroughbred horse
- Status: Open
- Website: https://www.northernfarm.jp/

Northern Farm (Japanese: ノーザンファーム) is a major Japanese horse breeding farm located in Abira, Hokkaido. The farm is part of the Shadai Group, and has continuously been the leading breeder of thoroughbred horses for 12 consecutive years from 2010 to 2021.

According to the Racing Post, it is the centre of the Japanese racehorse breeding industry and the Yoshidas that own Northern Farm are "the new world superpower of breeding". It is home to over 3,000 horses worth $100 million.

== Timeline ==
=== Shadai Farm Hayakita era ===
- 1967 - Zenya Yoshida founds the Shadai Farm Hayakita in the town of Hayakita (now Abira).
- 1976 - Northern Taste arrives at the farm.
- 1980 - Shadai Diners Thoroughbred Club (future Shadai Thoroughbred Club) founded.
- 1988 - Japan Diners Thoroughbred Club (future Sunday Thoroughbred Club) founded.
- 1989 - Tony Bin arrives at the farm.
- 1991 - Sunday Silence arrives at the farm.
- 1993 - Zenya Yoshida passes away on August 13.

=== Northern Farm era ===
- 1994 - Shadai Farm Hayakita is rebranded as the Northern Farm in January.
- 1999 - One of their bred horses, Shiva, becomes the first Japanese-bred horse to win a foreign Grade 1 race.
- 1999 - Wins the Leading Breeder title for the first time. Since then, Northern Farm has consistently been either the breeding leader of Japan or in second place.
- 2005 - Deep Impact, one of the horses bred at the farm, becomes a Triple Crown Winner.
- 2010 - Apapane, one of the horses bred at the farm, becomes a Filly Triple Crown Winner.
- 2011 - Northern Farm purchases the Ten'ei Horse Park in Fukushima and renames it the Northern Farm Ten'ei. At the same time, Northern Farm pulled out of Shadai's Yamamoto Training Center in Miyagi.
- 2012 - Gentildonna, one of the horses bred at the farm, becomes a Filly Triple Crown Winner.
- 2018 - Almond Eye, one of the horses bred at the farm, becomes a Filly Triple Crown Winner.
- 2021 - Two horses bred at the farm became the first Japan-bred horses to win Breeders' Cup races—first Loves Only You in the Filly & Mare Turf, followed about two hours later by Marche Lorraine in the Distaff. Loves Only You went on the become the first Japan-bred to win an Eclipse Award in the US, specifically as champion female turf horse.
- 2025 - Forever Young, one of the horses bred at the farm, becomes the first Japan-bred horse to win the Breeders' Cup Classic.

== Affiliated facilities and organizations ==
- Northern Farm Airport Farm
- Northern Horse Park
- Northern Farm Yearling
- Northern Farm Tenei
- Northern Farm Shigaraki
- Northern Racing
- Sunday Thoroughbred Club
- Sunday Racing

== Notable horses bred ==
Horses are listed by year of birth.

=== Shadai Farm Hayakita era ===
- Amber Shadai
- Shadai Ivor
- Gallop Dyna
- Shadai Sophia
- Let's Go Tarquin
- Sakura Bakushin O
- Vega
- Air Groove
- Fusaichi Concorde

=== Northern Farm era ===
- Shiva
- Admire Vega
- To the Victory
- Blandices
- Jungle Pocket
- Big Taste
- Admire Don
- Admire Max
- Admire Groove
- Orewa Matteruze
- Utopia
- Company
- King Kamehameha
- Delta Blues
- Vermilion
- Kane Hekili
- Cesario
- Deep Impact
- Rhein Kraft
- Admire Jupiter
- Admire Moon
- Alondite
- Fusaichi Pandora
- Fusaichi Richard
- Blumenblatt
- Victory
- Sleepless Night
- Oken Bruce Lee
- Tall Poppy
- Black Emblem
- Unrivaled
- Tosen Jordan
- Buena Vista
- Logi Universe
- Apapane
- Gold Blitz
- Taisei Legend
- Rulership
- Rose Kingdom
- Aventura
- Admire Rakti
- Grand Prix Boss
- Real Impact
- Reve d'Essor
- Alfredo
- Verxina
- Curren Black Hill
- Gentildonna
- Joie de Vivre
- Epiphaneia
- Chrysolite
- Lachesis
- Lovely Day
- Robe Tissage
- Satono Aladdin
- Tosen Stardom
- Harp Star
- Marialite
- Mikki Isle
- Neorealism
- Satono Crown
- Cheval Grand
- Duramente
- Mikki Queen
- Real Steel
- Admire Lead
- Vivlos
- Gold Dream
- Satono Diamond
- Sinhalite
- Makahiki
- Mikki Rocket
- Major Emblem
- Leontes
- Rainbow Line
- Aerolithe
- Al Ain
- Suave Richard
- Deirdre
- Yoshida
- Lys Gracieux
- Rey de Oro
- Almond Eye
- Indy Champ
- Saxon Warrior
- Stelvio
- Chuwa Wizard
- Normcore
- Fierement
- Blast Onepiece
- Mer de Glace
- Lucky Lilac
- Wagnerian
- Admire Mars
- Gran Alegria
- Chrysoberyle
- Chrono Genesis
- Saturnalia
- Nova Lenda
- Marche Lorraine
- Loves Only You
- World Premiere
- Salios
- Danon Pharaoh
- Lei Papale
- Resistencia
- Potager
- Jun Light Bolt
- Akaitorino Musume
- Efforia
- Grenadier Guards
- Shahryar
- Snowfall
- Sodashi
- Danon The Kid
- Pixie Knight
- Songline
- Geraldina
- Do Deuce
- Killer Ability
- Geoglyph
- Stunning Rose
- Equinox
- Valle de la Luna
- Liberty Island
- Dura Erede
- Durezza
- Tastiera
- Ascoli Piceno
- Cervinia
- Forever Young
- Justin Milano
- Stellenbosch
- Urban Chic

== Notable broodmares ==
=== Current broodmares ===
- Kiku
- Almond Eye
- I'm Yours
- Aventura
- Aerolithe
- Admire Lead
- Admire Miyabi
- Apapane
- Azeri
- Animate Bio
- Albiano
- Andes Queen
- Elusive Wave
- Vivlos
- Verxina
- Uliuli
- Esmeraldina
- Epice Arome
- F T Maia
- Awesome Feather
- Covert Love
- Queen's Barn
- Clave Secreta
- Gran Alegria
- Gullveig
- Chrono Genesis
- Condo Commando
- Contra Check
- Satono Rainas
- Samitar
- Salacia
- Salomina (dam of Salacia and Salios)
- Sang Real
- Geraldina
- Jaywalk
- Shells Lei
- She's a Tiger
- Chateau Blanche
- Supreme Gift
- Siyouma
- Shoryu Moon
- Silverskaya
- Ginger Punch
- Sinhalite
- Sweet Reason
- Stardom Bound
- Stephanie's Kitten
- Touching Speech
- Dust and Diamonds
- Dea Regalo
- Dear Chance
- Dia de la Novia
- Dia de la Madre
- Dirndl
- De Gratia
- To the Victory
- Donna Blini
- Donau Blue
- Dubai Majesty
- Normcore
- Harp Star
- Bounce SHasse
- Hikaru Amaranthus
- Buchiko
- Buena Vista
- Black Emblem
- Blumenblatt
- Portofino
- Magic Time
- Marialite
- Mikki Queen
- Mood Indigo
- Major Emblem
- Mosheen
- Yukichan
- Lailaps
- Lucky Lilac
- Lilacs and Lace
- Lachesis
- Loves Only Me
- Loves Only You
- Ria Antonia
- Listen
- Lilavati
- Liliside
- Lune d'Or
- Lys Gracieux
- Rouge Buck
- Reve d'Essor
- Rosebud
- Robe Tissage

=== Former broodmares ===
- Idol Marie
- Admire Groove
- Antique Value
- Wind in Her Hair
- Welsh Muffin
- Air Groove
- Air Pascale
- Kyoei March
- Catherine Parr
- Chrysoprase
- J'Ai Deux Amours
- Shadai Tarquin
- Shirayukihime
- Silk Prima Donna
- Cesario
- Sweep Tosho
- Scarlet Lady
- Sleepless Night
- Soninke
- Daiichi Ruby
- Dyna Carle
- Dyna Shoot
- Tapitsfly
- Tokio Reality
- Tall Poppy
- Biwa Heidi
- Fast Friend
- Fancimine
- Fairy Doll
- Fusaichi Pandora
- Fusaichi Airedale
- Buzen Candle
- Free Talk
- Vega
- Lady Blonde
- Admire Sunday
- Grace Admire
- Gold Tiara
- Gentildonna
- Dear Geena
- Happy Path
- Ballet Queen
- Broad Appeal
- Manfath
- Rose Colour
- Malpensa
- Reve d'Oscar
- Miss Encore
- British Idiom
- Brilliant Very
- Winter (Temporarily leased from the Coolmore Stud)
- Minding (Temporarily leased from the Coolmore Stud)
- Hydrangea (Temporarily leased from the Coolmore Stud)
- Happily (Temporarily leased from the Coolmore Stud)
- Maybe (Temporarily leased from the Coolmore Stud)
- Rododendron (Temporarily leased from the Coolmore Stud)
- Northern Driver
- Crafty Wife
- Magic Goddess
- Rustic Belle
- Bella Rheia

== See also ==
- Shadai Stallion Station
