= Wagnerian (horse) =

Japanese-bred Thoroughbred racehorse

Wagnerian ワグネリアン
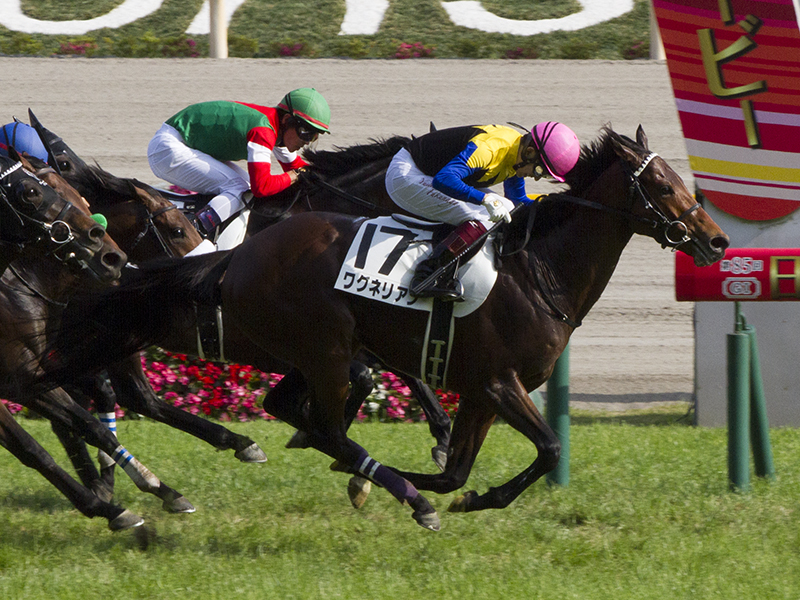
- Wagnerian wins the Tokyo Yushun
- Breed: Thoroughbred
- Sire: Deep Impact
- Grandsire: Sunday Silence
- Dam: Miss Encore
- Damsire: King Kamehameha
- Sex: Stallion
- Foaled: 10 February 2015
- Died: 5 January 2022 (aged 6)
- Country: Japan
- Colour: Bay
- Breeder: Northern Farm
- Owner: Kaneko Makoto Holdings
- Racing colours
- Trainer: Yasuo Tomomichi
- Jockey: Yuichi Fukunaga
- Record: 17: 5-1-2
- Earnings: ¥512,437,000

Major wins
- Tokyo Sports Hai Nisai Stakes (2017); Kobe Shimbun Hai (2018); Japanese Classic Race wins: Tokyo Yushun (2018)

Wagnerian (Japanese: ワグネリアン, Hepburn: Wagunerian; 10 February 2015 - 5 January 2022) was a Japanese Thoroughbred racehorse. He was one of the best two-year-olds in Japan in 2017 when he was unbeaten in three races including the Grade 3 Tokyo Sports Hai Nisai Stakes. In the following spring he was defeated in his first two starts of the year but then recorded his biggest win in the Tokyo Yushun (Japanese Derby). On his only subsequent appearance of 2018 he won the Kobe Shimbun Hai. Wagnerian failed to win in 2019 but finished third in both the Osaka Hai and the Japan Cup.

== Background ==
Wagnerian is a bay horse with no white markings bred in Hokkaido, Japan at the Northern Farm by his owner Makoto Kaneko. During his racing career he was trained by Yasuo Tomomichi.

He was from the eighth crop of foals sired by Deep Impact, who was the Japanese Horse of the Year in 2005 and 2006, winning races including the Tokyo Yushun, Tenno Sho, Arima Kinen and Japan Cup. Deep Impact's other progeny include Gentildonna, Harp Star, Kizuna, A Shin Hikari, Marialite and Saxon Warrior. Wagnerian's dam Miss Encore, who won one race from nine attempts died in September 2018 as a result of injuries sustained in the Hokkaido earthquake. She was a daughter of Broad Appeal, an American-bred mare who was imported to Japan and won several good races on dirt. Broad Appeal was descended from the Irish broodmare Royal Meage, the ancestor of many major winners including Dancer's Image, Habitat and Suave Dancer.

== Racing career ==
=== 2017: two-year-old season ===
Wagnerian began his racing career on 12 July at Chukyo Racecourse when he was a narrow winner of a contest for previously unraced juveniles over 2000 metres. After a break of two months the colt returned in the Nojigiku Stakes over 1800 metres at Hanshin Racecourse and won by two lengths from Delos. On 18 November Wagnerian was stepped up in class for the Grade 3 Tokyo Sports Hai Nisai Stakes over 1800 metres at Tokyo Racecourse and started the 0.4/1 favourite against six opponents. Ridden by Yuichi Fukunaga, who became his regular jockey, he came home three lengths clear of Lucas, with Charlemagne a neck away in third.

In the official ratings for Japanese two-year-olds Wagnerian was rated the third best juvenile of the year behind Danon Premium (Asahi Hai Futurity Stakes) and Time Flyer (Hopeful Stakes).

=== 2018: three-year-old season ===
Wagnerian began his second campaign in the Yayoi Sho over 2000 metres at Nakayama Racecourse on 4 March in which he finished second of the ten runners, beaten one and a half lengths by Danon Premium. In the Grade 1 Satsuki Sho over the same distance on 15 April the colt was made the 5/2 favourite but came home seventh of the sixteen runners, almost six lengths behind the upset winner Epoca d'Oro. On 27 May, in front of a crowd of 126,767, Wagnerian was one of eighteen colts to contest the 85th edition of the Japanese Derby over 2400 metres at Tokyo and started the 11.5/1 fifth choice in the betting behind Danon Premium, Blast Onepiece, Kitano Commandeur and Epoca d'Oro. After tracking the leaders Wagnerian produced a sustained challenge down the centre of the course in the straight, gaining the advantage in the last 50 metres and winning by half a length from Epoca d'Oro with Cosmic Force, Etario, Blast Onepiece and Danon Premium close behind. Fukunaga, who was winning the race for the first time said "The staff did a terrific job in preparing the colt and he just gave his best. I just drove him feverishly to the line. I’ve won G1 races in Tokyo before, but to win the Derby is totally a different story. I was beginning to have doubts after having so many chances, but thanks to the support of my family and so many others, I’m thrilled to have won at last".

Following a break of almost four months Wagnerian returned to the track on 23 September for the Kobe Shimbun Hai over 2400 metres at Hanshin and started the 1.7/1 joint favourite alongside Epoca d'Oro. After racing in mid-division Wagnerian made strong progress in the straight, catching the front-running outsider Meisho Tekkon on the last 100 metres and holding off the late challenge of Etario to win by half a length. The colt was aimed at the autumn edition of the Tenno Sho but did not recover sufficiently from his race at Hanshin and was rested for the remainder of the year.

In January 2019 Wagnerian was runner-up to Blast Onepiece in the poll to determine the JRA Award for Best Three-Year-Old Colt for 2018 taking 88 of the 276 votes. In the 2018 World's Best Racehorse Rankings Wagnerian was rated the eleventh best three-year-old colt in the world and the fifth-ninth best horse of any age or sex.

=== 2019: four-year-old season ===
On his first appearance as a four-year-old Wagnerian started the 7.4/1 fourth favourite for the Grade 1 Osaka Hai at Hanshin on 31 March. He raced in mid-division before staying on strongly to take third place behind Al Ain and Kiseki, beaten half a length by the winner. He was then off the track for four and a half months before contesting the Grade 2 Sapporo Kinen in August when he finished fourth behind Blast Onepiece, Sungrazer and Fierement. After another break he returned in the autumn edition of the Tenno Sho at Tokyo on 27 October when he started at odds of 17.7/1 in a field of sixteen. He stayed on well from the rear of the field without looking likely to win and came home fifth as victory went to the filly Almond Eye. On 24 November Wagnerian ended his season by starting second favourite for the Japan Cup. After settling behind the leaders he lost his position entering the straight but then "unleashed a furious charge" to take third place behind Suave Richard and Curren Bouquetd'or.

=== 2020: five-year-old season ===
Wagnerian made his first appearance of 2020 in the Osaka Hai on 5 April and started the 4.2/1 fourth choice in the betting. He raced behind the leaders on the inside rail and struggled to obtain a clear run approaching the straight before finishing well to take fifth place, two and a half lengths behind the winner Lucky Lilac. At the same track on 28 June Wagnerian contested the 61st edition of the Grade 1 Takarazuka Kinen. He raced in second place behind the front-running outsider Tosen Surya for most of the way but dropped out of contention in the straight and came home thirteenth of the eighteen runners behind Chrono Genesis.

=== 2021: six-year-old season and death ===
Wagnerian was taken out of racing for a prolonged time due to problems with his throat and had undergone surgery to remove his vocal cords. He returned to race at the 2021 Kyoto Kinen but came in 5th place, and could not win anymore races. After finishing in 18th place at the Japan Cup, Wagnerian's health gradually deteriorated and he was hospitalized at an equine vet stable located inside the Ritto Training Center. At around 6PM on 5 January 2022, Wagnerian died at the vet's table, and after an autopsy was conducted it was revealed that the horse had an egg-sized gallstone stuck in his bile duct, which led to multiple organ failure.

Wagnerian's death marked the first death of an active Derby-winner in the Heisei era and the fifth ever, after Governor, Ieryu, Tokino Minoru, and Keystone.

== Racing form ==
Wagnerian won five races and placed in three others out of 17 starts. This data is based on JBIS and netkeiba.

Date	Track	Race	Grade	Distance (Condition)	Entry	HN	Odds (Favored)	Finish	Time	Margins	Jockey	Winner (Runner-up)
2017 – two-year-old season
Jul 16	Chukyo	2yo Newcomer		2,000 m (Firm)	10	8	4.0 (2)	1st	2:04.7	0.0	Yuichi Fukunaga	(Henry Barows)
Sep 16	Hanshin	Nojigiku Stakes		1,800 m (Soft)	9	2	1.9 (1)	1st	1:49.3	–0.4	Yuichi Fukunaga	(Delos)
Nov 18	Tokyo	Tokyo Sports Hai Nisai Stakes	3	1,800 m (Firm)	7	3	1.4 (1)	1st	1:46.6	–0.5	Yuichi Fukunaga	(Lucas)
2018 – three-year-old season
Mar 4	Nakayama	Yayoi Sho	2	2,000 m (Firm)	10	8	3.6 (2)	2nd	2:01.2	0.2	Yuichi Fukunaga	Danon Premium
Apr 15	Nakayama	Satsuki Sho	1	2,000 m (Good)	16	2	3.5 (1)	7th	2:01.6	0.8	Yuichi Fukunaga	Epoca d'Oro
May 27	Tokyo	Tokyo Yushun	1	2,400 m (Firm)	18	17	12.5 (5)	1st	2:23.6	–0.1	Yuichi Fukunaga	(Epoca d'Oro)
Sep 23	Hanshin	Kobe Shimbun Hai	2	2,400 m (Firm)	10	3	2.7 (2)	1st	2:25.6	–0.1	Kota Fujioka	(Etario)
2019 – four-year-old season
Mar 31	Hanshin	Osaka Hai	1	2,000 m (Firm)	14	2	8.2 (4)	3rd	2:01.1	0.1	Yuichi Fukunaga	Al Ain
Aug 18	Sapporo	Sapporo Kinen	2	2,000 m (Firm)	14	12	3.7 (2)	4th	2:00.3	0.2	Yuichi Fukunaga	Blast Onepiece
Oct 27	Tokyo	Tenno Sho (Autumn)	1	2,000 m (Firm)	16	14	18.7 (4)	5th	1:56.8	0.6	Yuichi Fukunaga	Almond Eye
Nov 24	Tokyo	Japan Cup	1	2,400 m (Soft)	15	2	4.3 (2)	3rd	2:26.2	0.3	Yuga Kawada	Suave Richard
2020 – five-year-old season
Apr 5	Hanshin	Osaka Hai	1	2,000 m (Firm)	12	4	5.2 (5)	5th	1:58.8	0.4	Yuichi Fukunaga	Lucky Lilac
Jun 28	Hanshin	Takarazuka Kinen	1	2,200 m (Good)	18	7	19.8 (7)	13th	2:16.8	3.3	Yuichi Fukunaga	Chrono Genesis
2021 – six-year-old season
Feb 14	Hanshin	Kyoto Kinen	2	2,200 m (Firm)	11	7	6.4 (2)	5th	2:11.1	0.7	Yutaka Take	Loves Only You
Apr 4	Hanshin	Osaka Hai	1	2,000 m (Soft)	13	6	49.8 (5)	12th	2:05.2	3.6	Hayato Yoshida	Lei Papale
Oct 23	Tokyo	Fuji Stakes	2	1,600 m (Firm)	17	14	9.4 (4)	6th	1:33.8	0.6	Yuichi Fukunaga	Songline
Nov 28	Tokyo	Japan Cup	1	2,400 m (Firm)	18	17	94.6 (13)	18th	2:27.1	2.4	Keita Tosaki	Contrail

Legend:
Turf

== Pedigree ==
Pedigree of Wagnerian (JPN), bay colt 2015
Sire Deep Impact (JPN) 2002	Sunday Silence (USA); 1986	Halo	Hail to Reason
Sire Deep Impact (JPN) 2002	Sunday Silence (USA); 1986	Halo	Cosmah
Sire Deep Impact (JPN) 2002	Sunday Silence (USA); 1986	Wishing Well	Understanding
Sire Deep Impact (JPN) 2002	Sunday Silence (USA); 1986	Wishing Well	Mountain Flower
Sire Deep Impact (JPN) 2002	Wind in Her Hair (IRE); 1991	Alzao (USA)	Lyphard
Sire Deep Impact (JPN) 2002	Wind in Her Hair (IRE); 1991	Alzao (USA)	Lady Rebecca (GB)
Sire Deep Impact (JPN) 2002	Wind in Her Hair (IRE); 1991	Burghclere (GB)	Busted
Sire Deep Impact (JPN) 2002	Wind in Her Hair (IRE); 1991	Burghclere (GB)	Highclere
Dam Miss Encore (JPN) 2006	King Kamehameha; 2001	Kingmambo (USA)	Mr Prospector
Dam Miss Encore (JPN) 2006	King Kamehameha; 2001	Kingmambo (USA)	Miesque
Dam Miss Encore (JPN) 2006	King Kamehameha; 2001	Manfath (IRE)	Last Tycoon
Dam Miss Encore (JPN) 2006	King Kamehameha; 2001	Manfath (IRE)	Pilot Bird (GB)
Dam Miss Encore (JPN) 2006	Broad Appeal (USA); 1994	Broad Brush	Ack Ack
Dam Miss Encore (JPN) 2006	Broad Appeal (USA); 1994	Broad Brush	Hay Patcher
Dam Miss Encore (JPN) 2006	Broad Appeal (USA); 1994	Valid Allure	Valid Appeal
Dam Miss Encore (JPN) 2006	Broad Appeal (USA); 1994	Valid Allure	Alluring Girl (Family: 4-r)
