= Al Ain (horse) =

Japanese Thoroughbred racehorse

Al Ain; アルアイン
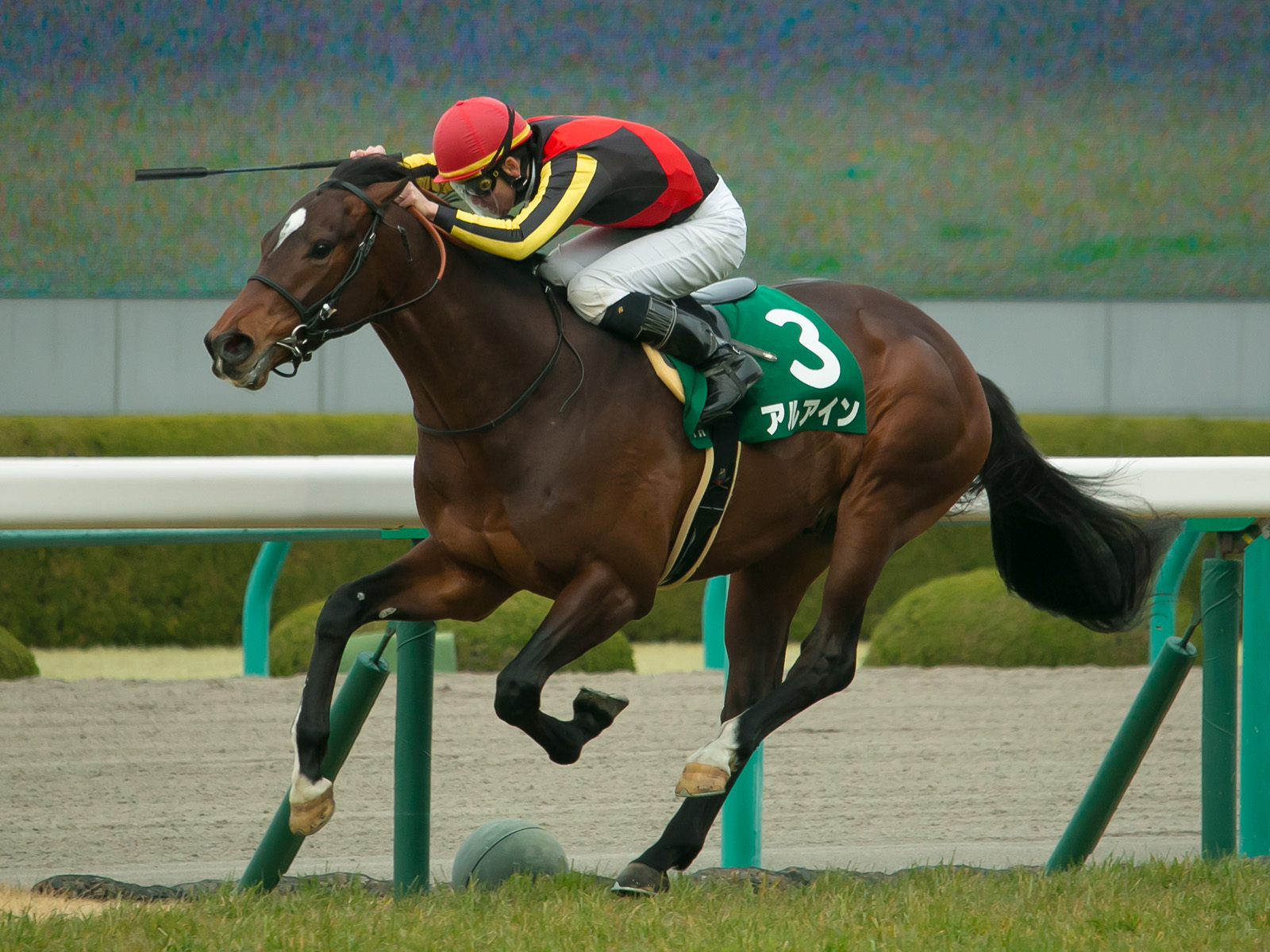
- Al Ain in March 2017
- Sire: Deep Impact
- Grandsire: Sunday Silence
- Dam: Dubai Majesty
- Damsire: Essence of Dubai
- Sex: Stallion
- Foaled: 1 May 2014
- Country: Japan
- Colour: Bay
- Breeder: Northern Farm
- Owner: Sunday Racing Co Ltd
- Racing colours
- Trainer: Yasutoshi Ikee
- Jockey: Kohei Matsuyama; Yuichi Kitamura
- Record: 20: 5-3-2
- Earnings: ¥511,702,000

Major wins
- Mainichi Hai (2017); Osaka Hai (2019); Japanese Classic Race wins: Satsuki Sho (2017)

Al Ain, (Japanese: アルアイン, foaled 1 May 2014) is a Japanese Thoroughbred racehorse. After winning two minor races in the autumn of 2016 he made significant improvement in the following spring to take the Mainichi Hai and the Satsuki Sho. Later that year he finished fifth in the Tokyo Yushun and second in the St Lite Kinen. As a four-year-old in 2018 he failed to win in six starts but ran well in several major races, finishing third in the Osaka Hai and the Mile Championship and fourth in the autumn edition of the Tenno Sho. In 2019 he recorded his first victory in almost two years when he won the Osaka Hai.

== Background ==
Al Ain is a bay horse with a white star and two white socks bred in Japan by Northern Farm. The horse entered the ownership of Sunday Racing and was sent into training with Yasutoshi Ikee. He was named after a city in Abu Dhabi.

He was from the seventh crop of foals sired by Deep Impact, who was the Japanese Horse of the Year in 2005 and 2006, winning races including the Tokyo Yushun, Tenno Sho, Arima Kinen and Japan Cup. Deep Impact's other progeny include Gentildonna, Harp Star, Kizuna, A Shin Hikari, Marialite and Saxon Warrior. Al Ain's dam Dubai Majesty was a top class performer on dirt in the United States, recording her biggest win when taking the Breeders' Cup Filly & Mare Sprint as a five-year-old in 2010. Two days after her Breeders' Cup win the mare was put up for auction at the Fasig-Tipton Kentucky November select breeding stock sale and bought for $1.1 million by Northern Farm's Katsumi Yoshida. She was a descendant of the Virginia-bred mare Knight's Gal who was the female-line ancestor of many good winners including Palace Malice and Mutafaweq. The mare went on to produce the Tokyo Yushun winner Shahryar.

== Racing career ==
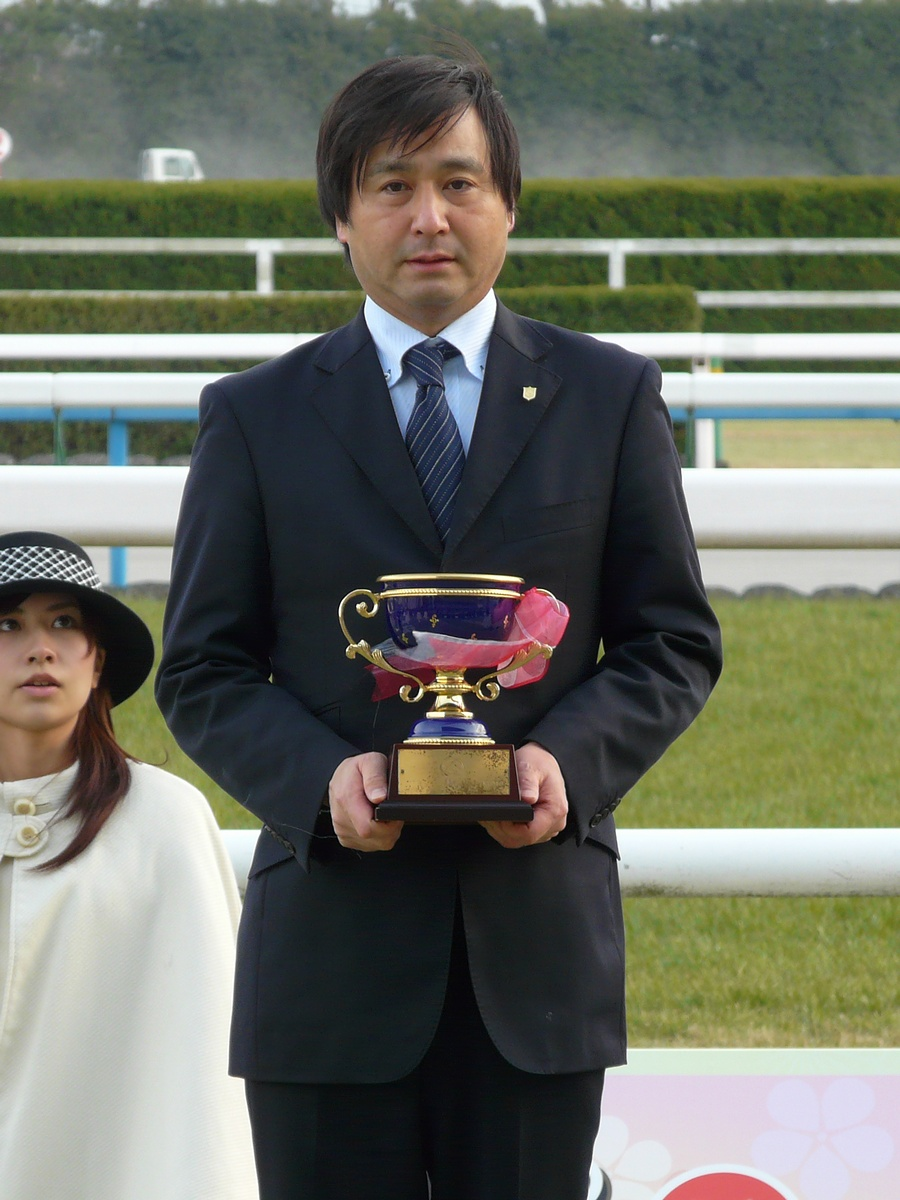
Al Ain's trainer Yasutoshi Ikee

=== 2016: two-year-old season ===
Al Ain began his racing career with a win in an event for previously unraced juveniles over 1600 metres at Kyoto Racecourse on 29 October. On 13 December at Hanshin Racecourse he followed up by taking the Senryo Sho over the same distance, beating Kyohei and thirteen others.

=== 2017: three-year-old season ===
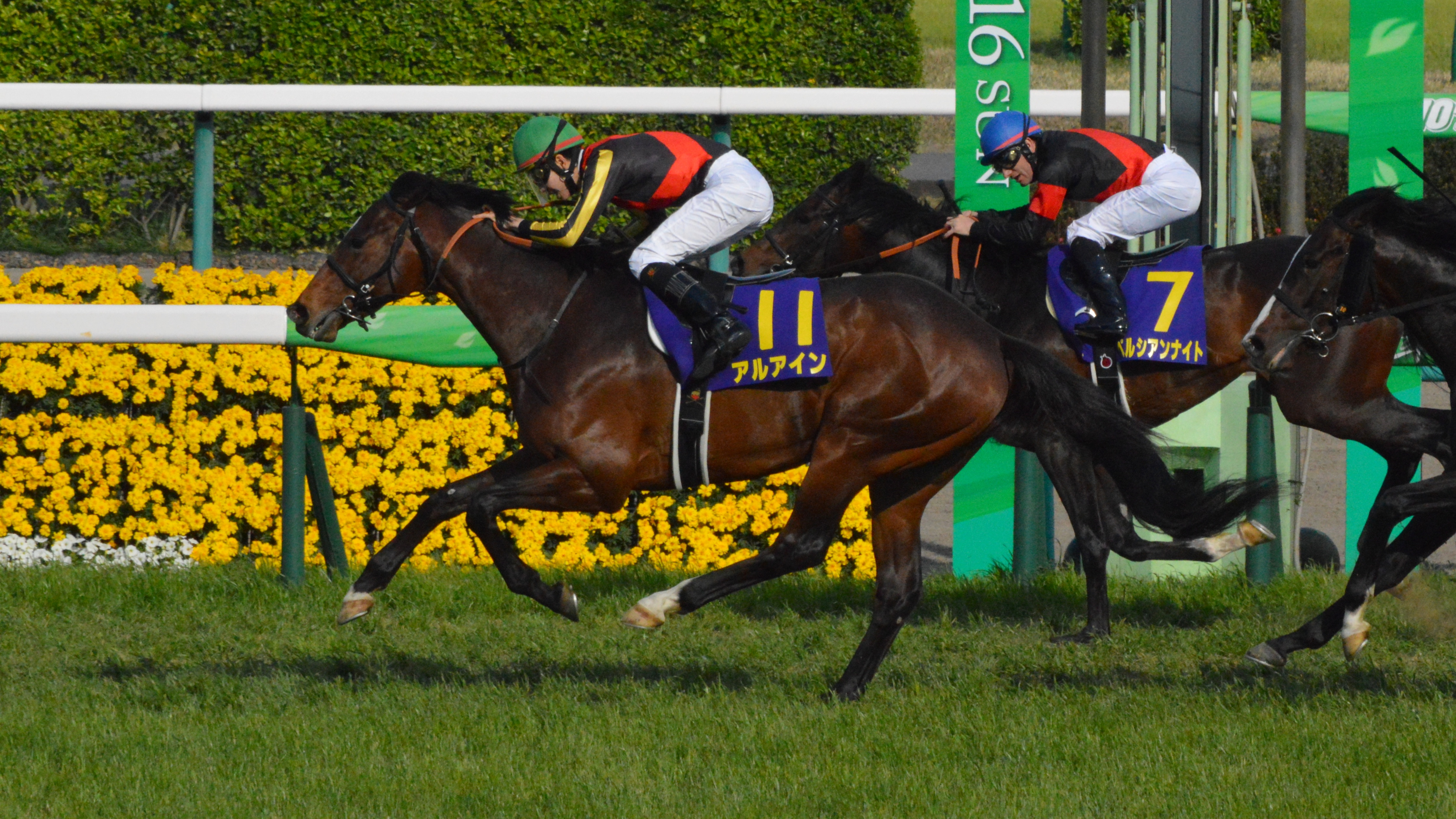
Al Ain winning the Satsuki Sho

On his three-year-old debut, sixteen days after his final run of 2016, Al Ain was moved up in class to contest the Grade 3 Shinzan Kinen at Kyoto on 8 January and sustained his first defeat as he came home sixth of the fifteen runners behind Kyohei, Taisei Starry, Persian Knight, Trust and My Style. After a break of two and a half months the colt returned for the Grade 3 Mainichi Hai (a trial race for the Satsuki Sho) over 1800 metres at Hanshin in which he was ridden by Kohei Matsuyama and started the 6.7/1 second favourite behind Satono Arthur in an eight-runner field. After racing in second place he took the lead in the straight and won by half a length from Satono Arthur with Kiseki half a length back in third.

On 26 April, with Matsuyama again in saddle, started a 21.4/1 outsider in an eighteen-runner field for the 77th running of the Satsuki Sho over 2000 metres at Nakayama Racecourse. The filly Fan Dii Naa (winner of the Flower Cup) started favourite while the other contenders included Suave Richard, Cadenas (Yayoi Sho), Persian Knight, Rey de Oro, Win Bright and Satono Ares (Asahi Hai Futurity Stakes). After tracking the leaders in the early stages Al Ain turned into the straight in fifth place behind Clincher and began to thread his way to the front. Fan Dii Na took the lead, before giving way to Persian Knight but Al Ain maintained his run, gained the advantage in the final strides and won by a neck. Matsuyama, who was winning his first Grade 1 race said "I can't believe we won! He ran a strong race last time so I was quite confident today. He wasn't responding well in the last two corners but stretched really well in the straight. He's easy to ride so I think he'll have no problem with the extra distance in the Derby."

Six weeks after his win at Nakayama Al Ain was stepped up in distance and started the 5.3/1 fourth choice in the betting for the 2400 metre Tokyo Yushun. After being slightly hampered early in the straight he stayed on well on the outside without ever looking likely to win and came home fifth behind Rey de Oro, Suave Richard, Admirable and My Style, beaten just over two lengths by the winner.

Christophe Lemaire took the ride when Al Ain returned from his summer break to contest the Grade 2 St Lite Kinen (a trial race for the Kikuka Sho) over 2200 metres at Nakayama on 18 September. He started odds-on favourite but after taking the lead in the straight he was overtaken and beaten into second place by Mikki Swallow. The Kikuka Sho over 3000 metres at Kyoto on 22 October was run in heavy rain on soft ground. Starting the 3.9/1 second choice Al Ain moved to the outside to deliver his challenge in the straight but could make no headway and came home seventh of the eighteen runners behind Kiseki.

In the 2017 World's Best Racehorse Rankings, Al Ain was given a rating of 118, making him 90th best horse in the world, the eighth best horse in Japan, and the seventeenth best three-year-old colt.

=== 2018: four-year-old season ===
Al Ain began his third campaign in the Grade 2 Kyoto Kinen on 11 February when he finished second to Clincher with Rey de Oro in third place. In the Grade 1 Osaka Hai at Hanshin on 1 April he was ridden by Yuga Kawada and started second favourite at odds of 2.6/1. After tracking the leaders he took second place behind Suave Richard in the straight but lost the runner-up spot to Persian Knight in the final strides. Four weeks later the colt was sent to Hong Kong for the Queen Elizabeth II Cup at Sha Tin Racecourse and finished fifth of the eight runners behind Pakistan Star.

Al Ain returned from the summer break on 23 September at Nakayama when he finished second by a neck to Rey de Oro in the Sankei Sho All Comers. In the autumn edition of the Tenno Sho at Tokyo on 28 October he raced in second place for most of the way but was unable to quicken in the closing stages and came home fourth behind Rey de Oro, Sungrazer and Kiseki. In November the colt was dropped back in distance to contest the Mile Championship over 1600 metres at Kyoto. Ridden by Kawada, he tracked the leader Aerolithe before taking the lead in the straight but was overtaken in the last 100 metres and finished third behind Stelvio and Persian Knight.

In the 2018 World's Best Racehorse Rankings, Al Ain was again given a rating of 118, making him 78th best horse in the world.

=== 2019: five-year-old season ===
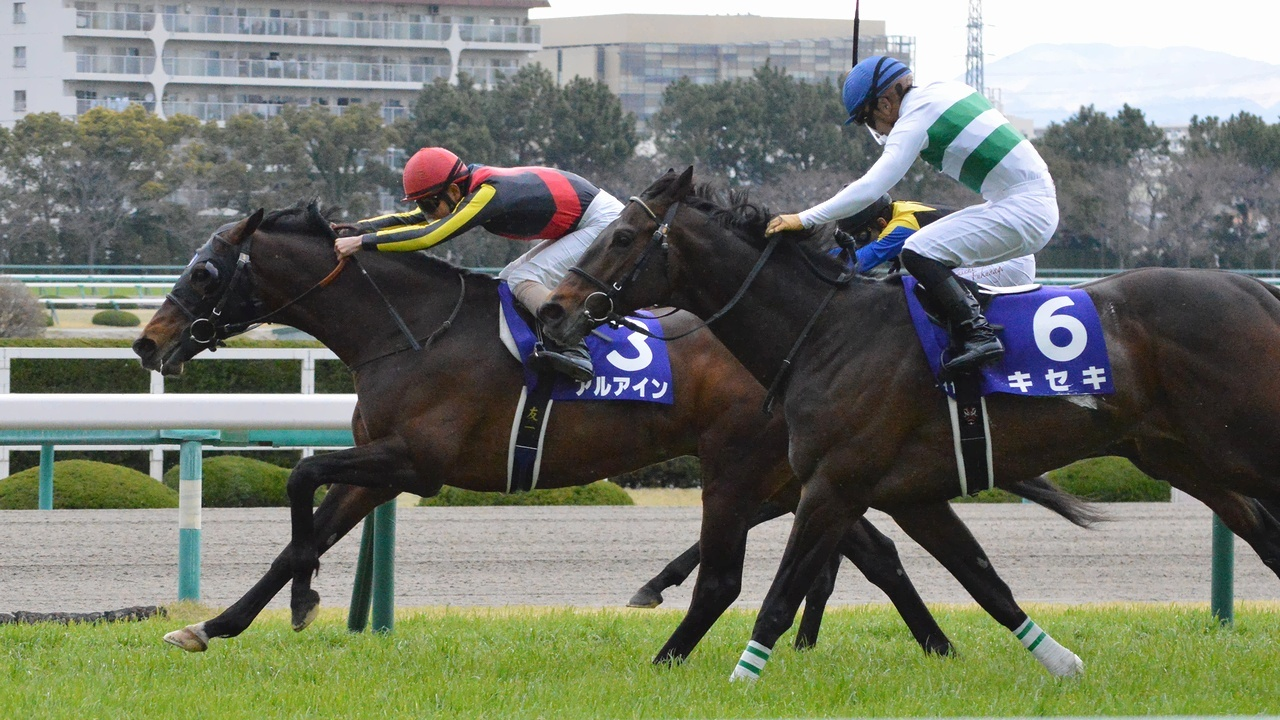
Al Ain winning the Osaka Hai

On 10 March 2019 Al Ain made his first appearance as a five-year-old in the Grade 2 Kinko Sho over 2000 metres at Chukyo Racecourse and came home fifth of the thirteen runners behind Danon Premium, Lys Gracieux, Air Windsor and Persian Knight. Ikee felt that the horse was unsuited by the "shifty" ground but admitted "He does have a difficult side and, mentally, things won't change". On 31 March at Hanshin Al Ain (equipped with blinkers) was ridden by Yuichi Kitamura when he started at odds of 21.2/1 in his second attempt to win the Osaka Hai. Blast Onepiece started favourite in a fourteen-runner field which also included Kiseki, Persian Knight, Wagnerian, Air Windsor (Challenge Cup), Stelvio, Sungrazer (Sapporo Kinen), Epoca d'Oro and Makahiki. Kitamura settled the horse on the inside behind the leaders as Epoca d'Oro set a steady pace from Kiseki. As the field entered the straight Al Ain made a forward move to take the lead 200 metres from the finish and kept on well to win by a neck from Kiseki with Wagnerian another neck away in third. After the race Kitamura commented "We had a good draw and everything worked to our advantage. He was able to focus using the blinkers and he responded well so I just concentrated on keeping him comfortable".

Al Ain's next appearance saw him made the 7.4/1 fifth choice in the betting for the Grade 1 Takarazuka Kinen at Hanshin on 23 June. He ran in third place for most of the way in a strongly-run race but was unable to make any significant progress in the straight and finished fourth behind Lys Gracieux, Kiseki and Suave Richard. He returned for an autumn campaign but made no impact in three races. He finished fourteenth behind Almond Eye in the Tenno Sho, sixteenth to Indy Champ in the Mile Championship and eleventh behind Lys Gracieux in the Arima Kinen.

Al Ain was retired from racing at the end of the year.

== Racing form ==
Al Ain won five races and hit five more podium finishes in 20 starts. This data is available in JBIS, netkeiba and HKJC.

Date	Track	Race	Grade	Distance (Condition)	Entry	HN	Odds (Favored)	Finish	Time	Margins	Jockey	Winner (Runner-up)
2016 – two-year-old season
Oct 29	Kyoto	2yo Newcomer		1,600 m (Firm)	13	8	2.3 (1)	1st	1:34.9	–0.1	Ryan Moore	(Killer Beauty)
Dec 23	Hanshin	Senryo Sho	ALW (1W)	1,600 m (Soft)	15	5	2.2 (1)	1st	1:36.5	–0.2	Vincent Cheminaud	(Kyohei)
2017 – three-year-old season
Jan 8	Kyoto	Shinzan Kinen	3	1,600 m (Soft)	15	7	3.6 (2)	6th	1:38.4	0.8	Vincent Cheminaud	Kyohei
Mar 25	Hanshin	Mainichi Hai	3	1,800 m (Firm)	8	3	7.7 (2)	1st	1:46.5	–0.1	Kohei Matsuyama	(Satono Arthur)
Apr 16	Nakayama	Satsuki Sho	1	2,000 m (Firm)	18	11	22.4 (9)	1st	R1:57.8	0.0	Kohei Matsuyama	(Persian Knight)
May 28	Tokyo	Tokyo Yushun	1	2,400 m (Firm)	18	7	6.3 (4)	5th	2:27.2	0.3	Kohei Matsuyama	Rey de Oro
Sep 18	Nakayama	St. Lite Kinen	2	2,200 m (Firm)	15	7	1.7 (1)	2nd	2:13.0	0.3	Christophe Lemaire	Mikki Swallow
Oct 22	Kyoto	Kikuka Sho	1	3,000 m (Heavy)	18	16	4.9 (2)	7th	3:19.7	0.8	Christophe Lemaire	Kiseki
2018 – four-year-old season
Feb 11	Kyoto	Kyoto Kinen	2	2,200 m (Soft)	10	10	6.6 (3)	2nd	2:16.5	0.2	Yuga Kawada	Clincher
Apr 1	Hanshin	Osaka Hai	1	2,000 m (Firm)	16	8	3.6 (2)	3rd	1:58.4	0.2	Yuga Kawada	Suave Richard
Apr 29	Sha Tin	QEII Cup	1	2,000 m (Firm)	8	2	4.4 (3)	5th	2:01.3	1.1	Cristian Demuro	Pakistan Star
Sep 23	Nakayama	Sankei Sho All Comers	2	2,200 m (Firm)	12	1	5.0 (3)	2nd	2:11.2	0.0	Yuichi Kitamura	Rey de Oro
Oct 28	Tokyo	Tenno Sho (Autumn)	1	2,000 m (Firm)	12	7	12.7 (5)	4th	1:57.2	0.4	Yuichi Kitamura	Rey de Oro
Nov 18	Kyoto	Mile Championship	1	1,600 m (Firm)	18	3	6.6 (4)	3rd	1:33.5	0.2	Yuga Kawada	Stelvio
2019 – four-year-old season
Mar 10	Chukyo	Kinko Sho	2	2,000 m (Good)	13	10	6.8 (3)	5th	2:01.0	0.9	Yuichi Shibayama	Danon Premium
Mar 31	Hanshin	Osaka Hai	1	2,000 m (Firm)	14	3	22.4 (9)	1st	2:01.0	0.0	Yuichi Kitamura	(Kiseki)
Jun 23	Hanshin	Takarazuka Kinen	1	2,200 m (Firm)	12	4	8.4 (5)	4th	2:11.9	1.1	Yuichi Kitamura	Lys Gracieux
Oct 27	Tokyo	Tenno Sho (Autumn)	1	2,000 m (Firm)	16	16	67.9 (9)	14th	1:58.7	2.5	Yuichi Kitamura	Almond Eye
Nov 17	Kyoto	Mile Championship	1	1,600 m (Firm)	17	10	15.5 (5)	16th	1:34.9	1.9	Ryan Moore	Indy Champ
Dec 22	Nakayama	Arima Kinen	1	2,500 m (Firm)	16	13	160.6 (15)	11th	2:32.8	2.3	Kohei Matsuyama	Lys Gracieux

Legend:
Turf

- R indicated that it was a record finish time.

== Stud record ==
Al Ain became a breeding stallion at the Breeders Stallion Station in Hokkaido. His first crop of foals included the Yayoi Sho winner Cosmo Kuranda. His first progeny to win a G1 is Laughterlines when she won the 2026 Queen Elizabeth II Cup.

=== Major winners ===
c = colt, f = filly

Grade winners
Foaled	Name	Sex	Major Wins
2021	Cosmo Kuranda	c	Yayoi Sho
2023	Laughterlines	f	Flora Stakes, Queen Elizabeth II Cup

== Pedigree ==
Pedigree of Al Ain (JPN), bay stallion 2014
Sire Deep Impact (JPN) 2002	Sunday Silence (USA); 1986	Halo	Hail to Reason
Sire Deep Impact (JPN) 2002	Sunday Silence (USA); 1986	Halo	Cosmah
Sire Deep Impact (JPN) 2002	Sunday Silence (USA); 1986	Wishing Well	Understanding
Sire Deep Impact (JPN) 2002	Sunday Silence (USA); 1986	Wishing Well	Mountain Flower
Sire Deep Impact (JPN) 2002	Wind in Her Hair (IRE); 1991	Alzao (USA)	Lyphard
Sire Deep Impact (JPN) 2002	Wind in Her Hair (IRE); 1991	Alzao (USA)	Lady Rebecca (GB)
Sire Deep Impact (JPN) 2002	Wind in Her Hair (IRE); 1991	Burghclere (GB)	Busted
Sire Deep Impact (JPN) 2002	Wind in Her Hair (IRE); 1991	Burghclere (GB)	Highclere
Dam Dubai Majesty (USA) 2005	Essence of Dubai (USA); 1999	Pulpit	A.P. Indy
Dam Dubai Majesty (USA) 2005	Essence of Dubai (USA); 1999	Pulpit	Preach
Dam Dubai Majesty (USA) 2005	Essence of Dubai (USA); 1999	Epitome	Summing
Dam Dubai Majesty (USA) 2005	Essence of Dubai (USA); 1999	Epitome	Honest And True
Dam Dubai Majesty (USA) 2005	Great Majesty (USA); 1990	Great Above	Minnesota Mac
Dam Dubai Majesty (USA) 2005	Great Majesty (USA); 1990	Great Above	Ta Wee
Dam Dubai Majesty (USA) 2005	Great Majesty (USA); 1990	Mistic Majesty	His Majesty
Dam Dubai Majesty (USA) 2005	Great Majesty (USA); 1990	Mistic Majesty	Necara's Miss (Family: 2-s)
