= Rey de Oro =

Japanese-bred Thoroughbred racehorse

Rey de Oro レイデオロ
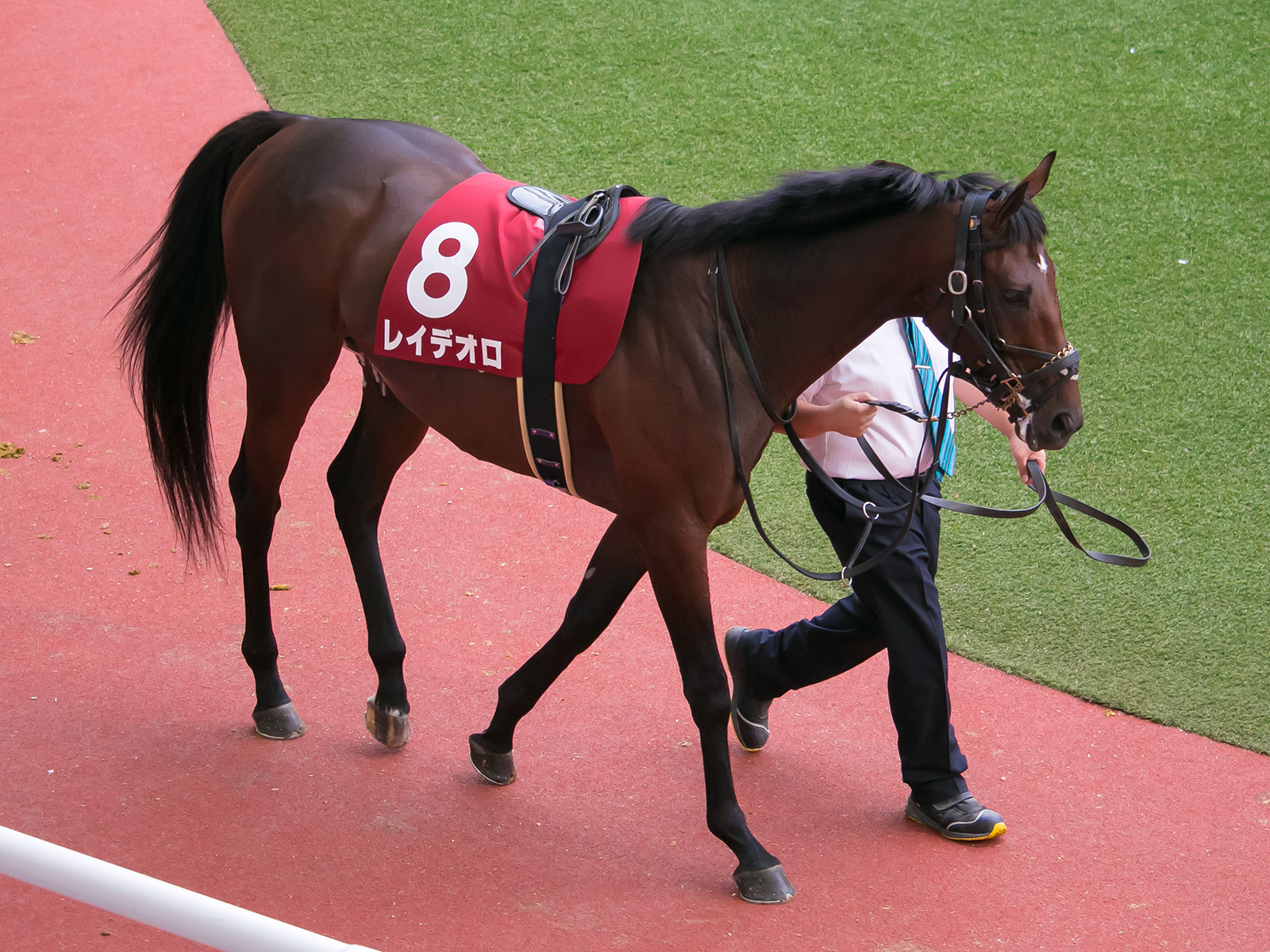
- Rey de Oro at Hanshin Racecourse in September 2017.
- Breed: Thoroughbred
- Sire: King Kamehameha
- Grandsire: Kingmambo
- Dam: La Dorada
- Damsire: Symboli Kris S
- Sex: Stallion
- Foaled: February 5, 2014 (age 12)
- Country: Japan
- Colour: Bay
- Breeder: Northern Farm
- Owner: U Carrot Farm
- Racing colours
- Trainer: Kazuo Fujisawa
- Jockey: Christophe Lemaire
- Record: 17: 7-2-1
- Earnings: ¥881,550,000

Major wins
- Hopeful Stakes (2016); Kobe Shimbun Hai (2017); Sankei Sho All Comers (2018); Tennō Shō (Autumn) (2018); Japanese Classic Race wins: Tokyo Yushun (2017)

Awards
- JRA Award for Best Three-Year-Old Colt (2017); JRA Award for Best Older Male Horse (2018)

Rey de Oro (Japanese: レイデオロ, Hepburn: Rei De Oro; 5 February 2014) is a retired Japanese Thoroughbred racehorse and sire. As a juvenile in 2016 he was undefeated in three races including the Grade 1 Hopeful Stakes and was rated one of the best two-year-old colts in Japan. In the following year he won the Tokyo Yushun and Kobe Shimbun Hai and finished second in the Japan Cup. At the end of the season, he was rated one of the best three-year-old colts in the world and took the JRA Award for Best Three-Year-Old Colt. As a four-year-old in 2018, he won the Sankei Sho All Comers and the Autumn Tennō Shō.

== Background ==
Rey de Oro is a bay horse with a white star bred in Japan by Northern Farm. During his racing career he carried the green, white and pink colours of U Carrot Farm and was trained by Kazuo Fujisawa. He has been ridden in most of his races by Christophe Lemaire.

His sire, King Kamehameha was one of the best Japanese colts of his generation, beating a field including Heart's Cry and Daiwa Major in the 2004 Japanese Derby. His other winners as a breeding stallion include Lord Kanaloa, Rose Kingdom, Leontes, Apapane and Duramente. Rey de Oro's dam La Dorado showed some racing ability, winning four of her eighteen races between 2009 and 2011 and was a half-sister to the Grade 3 winner Gold Blitz. She was a granddaughter of the Irish-bred mare Wind In Her Hair, the dam of Deep Impact.

== Racing career ==
=== 2016: two-year-old season ===
Rey de Oro made his debut in a contest for previously unraced two-year-olds over 2000 metres at Tokyo Racecourse on 9 October and won by a length. He followed up on 3 December when he won the Hopeful Stakes over the same distance at Nakayama Racecourse. The colt was then moved up in class for the Grade 2 Hopeful Stakes over the same course and distance on 25 December. He started the 1/2 favourite in a fourteen-runner field and won by one and a quarter length from Meiner Sphene.

Rey de Oro finished runner up to Satono Ares in the voting for the JRA Award for Best Two-Year-Old Colt.

=== 2017: three-year-old season ===
On his first run of 2017 Rey de Oro started at 9.4/1 in an eighteen-runner field for the Grade 1 Satsuki Sho over 2000 metres at Nakayama. He was towards the rear in the early stages before finishing well and came home fifth behind Al Ain, Persian Knight, Danburite and Clincher. On 28 May Rey de Oro was one of eighteen three-year-old colts to contest the 84th running of the Tokyo Yushun over 2400 metres at Tokyo Racecourse. He was made the 4.3/1 second favourite behind the Aoba Sho winner Admirable while the others included Suave Richard, Al Ain, Satono Arthur, Persian Knight, Danburite and Clincher. With Lemaire in the saddle he raced towards the rear before moving up into second place behind the front-running My Style approaching the final turn. He took the lead 200 metres from the finish and won by three quarters of a length from Suave Richard, with Admirable a length and a quarter back in third. Lemaire reportedly commented "We had no specific tactic, but we were forced to travel toward the rear after a slow start and the pace was slow, so I decided to move forward in the backstretch. He was very relaxed and was responding well in the homestretch so I knew we will win in the last 100 meters."

After a summer break, Rey de Oro returned for the Grade 2 Kobe Shimbun Hai (a trial race for the Kikuka Sho) over 2400 metres at Hanshin Racecourse. Starting the 1.2/1 favourite he tracked the leaders before taking the lead inside the furlong and won "readily" by two lengths from Kiseki. On 26 November Rey de Oro was matched against top class older horses to contest the Japan Cup over 2400 metres at Tokyo and started 2.8/1 second favourite behind the five-year-old Kitasan Black. After racing in mid-division he stayed on strongly in the straight to finish second to Cheval Grand with Kitasan Black in third. The other beaten horses included Idaho, Makahiki, Soul Stirring and Satono Crown.

In January 2018, Rey de Oro won the JRA Award for Best Three-Year-Old Colt, taking 289 of the 290 votes.

In the 2017 World's Best Racehorse Rankings, Rey de Oro was given a rating of 121, making him twenty-ninth best horse in the world, the third best horse in Japan, and the fifth best three-year-old.

=== 2018: four-year-old season ===
At Kyoto Racecourse on 11 February, Rey de Oro began his third campaign in the Grade 2 Kyoto Kinen over 2200 metres. He started the odds-on favourite but was beaten a length and a neck into third place by Clincher and Al Ain. He was then sent to the United Arab Emirates to contest the Sheema Classic on 31 March and stayed on in the straight to come home fourth of the ten runners behind Hawkbill, Poet's Word and Cloth of Stars. Lemaire later reported that he had problems settling the horse in the race.

Rey de Oro was off the track for almost six months before returning for the Grade 2 Sankei Sho All Comers at Nakayama on 23 September. He started favourite and won by a neck from Al Ain, with the pair finishing three lengths clear of the other ten runners. Five weeks later, with Lemaire in the saddle, the colt started the 2.1/1 second favourite behind Suave Richard for the autumn edition of the Grade 1 Tenno Sho over 2000 metres at Tokyo. The other ten runners included Sungrazer (Sapporo Kinen), Makahiki, Kiseki, Al Ain, Vivlos and Mikki Rocket (Takarazuka Kinen). After racing in sixth place, Rey de Oro moved into contention on the outside on the final turn before taking the lead from the front-running Kiseki in the straight. He won by one and a quarter lengths from Sungrazer, with Kiseki a nose further back in third. Lemaire commented "I knew I had a good chance to win. The colt's condition and the race development were perfect. The pace was just right and the colt was relaxed so everything went smoothly. He showed good long-lasting speed".

As Lemaire had been booked to ride the filly Almond Eye in the Japan Cup, Rey de Oro's connections opted to bypass the race in favour of the Arima Kinen. When asked to compare the two horses Lemaire said "Almond Eye is like a Ferrari, but Rey de Oro is like a Land Rover. He's strong and he can keep giving you more in the stretch. He's like a fast four-wheel drive." On 23 December the colt started 6/5 favourite for the Arima Kinen at Nakayama. The field was partly determined by a public vote and Rey de Oro stopped the poll ahead of the absent Almond Eye and the popular steeplechaser Oju Chosan. After racing in ninth on the outside he produced a strong late run in the straight but failed by a neck to overhaul the three-year-old Blast Onepiece.

In January 2019 Rey de Oro was voted JRA Award for Best Older Male Horse at the JRA Awards for 2018, taking 212 of the 276 votes.

=== 2019: five-year-old season ===
In March 2019 Rey de Oro was again sent to Dubai for the Sheema Classic, but after leading for most of the way he faded badly in the straight and finished sixth of the eight runners, more than twelve lengths behind the winner Old Persian. The colt returned to Japan and made his next appearance in the Takarazuka Kinen over 2200 metres at Hanshin on 23 June in which he started the 2.9/1 second favourite in a field of twelve. He raced on the inside in sixth place but was unable to make any significant progress in the straight and came home fifth behind Lys Gracieux, Kiseki, Suave Richard and Al Ain.

After a three-month break Rey de Oro returned to the track and attempted to repeat his 2018 success in the Sankei Sho All Comers. He started favourite but finished fourth, two and a quarter lengths behind the winner Stiffelio. Despite having failed to win in over a year, Rey de Oro started the 3.2/1 favourite for the Japan Cup on 24 November but came home eleventh of the fifteen runners behind Suave Richard. On his final start of the year he ran unplaced behind Lys Gracieux in the Arima Kinen at Nakayama on 22 December. Following the Arima Kinen, he retired from racing to stand stud at Shadai Stallion Station.

== Racing form ==
Rey de Oro gained seven wins in 17 starts. This data is available based on JBIS, netkeiba and racingpost.

| Date | Track | Race | Grade | Distance (Condition) | Entry | HN | Odds (Favored) | Finish | Time | Margins | Jockey | Winner (Runner-up) |
|---|---|---|---|---|---|---|---|---|---|---|---|---|
2016 – two-year-old season
| Oct 9 | Tokyo | 2yo Newcomer | | 2,000 m (Soft) | 16 | 1 | 1.7 (1) | 1st | 2:04.3 | –0.2 | Christophe Lemaire | (Port Vendres) |
| Dec 3 | Nakayama | Habotan Sho | ALW (1W) | 2,000 m (Firm) | 12 | 11 | 1.7 (1) | 1st | 2:01.0 | –0.2 | Christophe Lemaire | (Komano Impulse) |
| Dec 25 | Nakayama | Hopeful Stakes | 2 | 2,000 m (Firm) | 14 | 2 | 1.5 (1) | 1st | 2:01.3 | –0.2 | Christophe Lemaire | (Meiner Sphene) |
2017 – three-year-old season
| Apr 16 | Nakayama | Satsuki Sho | 1 | 2,000 m (Firm) | 18 | 5 | 10.4 (5) | 5th | 1:58.2 | 0.4 | Christophe Lemaire | Al Ain |
| May 28 | Tokyo | Tokyo Yushun | 1 | 2,400 m (Firm) | 18 | 12 | 5.3 (2) | 1st | 2:26.9 | –0.1 | Christophe Lemaire | (Suave Richard) |
| Sep 24 | Hanshin | Kobe Shimbun Hai | 2 | 2,400 m (Firm) | 14 | 8 | 2.2 (1) | 1st | 2:24.6 | –0.3 | Christophe Lemaire | (Kiseki) |
| Nov 26 | Tokyo | Japan Cup | 1 | 2,400 m (Firm) | 17 | 2 | 3.8 (2) | 2nd | 2:23.9 | 0.2 | Christophe Lemaire | Cheval Grand |
2018 – four-year-old season
| Feb 11 | Kyoto | Kyoto Kinen | 2 | 2,200 m (Soft) | 10 | 6 | 1.6 (1) | 3rd | 2:16.5 | 0.2 | Dario Vargiu | Clincher |
| Mar 31 | Meydan | Dubai Sheema Classic | 1 | 2,410 m (Firm) | 10 | 3 | 3.0 (2) | 4th | 2:30.5 | 1.0 | Christophe Lemaire | Hawkbill |
| Sep 23 | Nakayama | Sankei Sho All Comers | 2 | 2,200 m (Firm) | 12 | 7 | 2.0 (1) | 1st | 2:11.2 | 0.0 | Christophe Lemaire | (Al Ain) |
| Oct 28 | Tokyo | Tennō Shō (Autumn) | 1 | 2,000 m (Firm) | 12 | 4 | 3.1 (2) | 1st | 1:56.8 | –0.2 | Christophe Lemaire | (Sungrazer) |
| Dec 23 | Nakayama | Arima Kinen | 1 | 2,500 m (Good) | 16 | 12 | 2.2 (1) | 2nd | 2:32.0 | 0.0 | Christophe Lemaire | Blast Onepiece |
2019 – five-year-old season
| Mar 30 | Meydan | Dubai Sheema Classic | 1 | 2,410 m (Firm) | 8 | 6 | 2.9 (1) | 6th | 2:29.7 | 2.5 | Christophe Lemaire | Old Persian |
| Jun 23 | Hanshin | Takarazuka Kinen | 1 | 2,200 m (Firm) | 12 | 2 | 3.9 (2) | 5th | 2:12.1 | 1.3 | Christophe Lemaire | Lys Gracieux |
| Sep 22 | Nakayama | Sankei Sho All Comers | 2 | 2,200 m (Firm) | 10 | 8 | 2.2 (1) | 4th | 2:12.4 | 0.4 | Yuichi Fukunaga | Stiffelio |
| Nov 24 | Tokyo | Japan Cup | 1 | 2,400 m (Soft) | 15 | 8 | 4.2 (1) | 11th | 2:28.1 | 2.2 | William Buick | Suave Richard |
| Dec 22 | Nakayama | Arima Kinen | 1 | 2,500 m (Firm) | 16 | 8 | 35.8 (9) | 7th | 2:32.1 | 1.6 | Kosei Miura | Lys Gracieux |

Legend:
Turf

== Stud record ==
Rey de Oro started his stud duty in 2020 at Shadai Stallion Station for a fee of 6,000,000 JPY.

=== Notable progeny ===
Below data is based on JBIS Stallion Reports.

c = colt, f = filly
bold = grade 1 stakes

| **Foaled** | **Name** | **Sex** | **Major Wins** |
| 2021 | Sunrise Earth | c | Hanshin Daishōten |
| 2021 | Trovatore | c | Lord Derby Challenge Trophy, Tokyo Shimbun Hai, Epsom Cup |
| 2021 | Admire Terra | c | Meguro Kinen, Hanshin Daishōten |
| 2021 | Meursault | c | Antares Stakes |
| 2022 | Excite Bio | c | Radio Nikkei Sho |
| 2022 | Kalamatianos | c | Nakayama Kimpai |
| 2022 | My Universe | c | Nikkei Sho |

== Pedigree ==
Pedigree of Rey de Oro (JPN), bay horse, 2014
| Sire King Kamehameha (JPN) 2001 | Kingmambo (USA); 1990 | **Mr. Prospector** | Raise a Native |
| Sire King Kamehameha (JPN) 2001 | Kingmambo (USA); 1990 | **Mr. Prospector** | Gold Digger |
| Sire King Kamehameha (JPN) 2001 | Kingmambo (USA); 1990 | Miesque | Nureyev |
| Sire King Kamehameha (JPN) 2001 | Kingmambo (USA); 1990 | Miesque | Pasadoble |
| Sire King Kamehameha (JPN) 2001 | Manfath (IRE); 1991 | Last Tycoon | Try My Best (USA) |
| Sire King Kamehameha (JPN) 2001 | Manfath (IRE); 1991 | Last Tycoon | Mill Princess |
| Sire King Kamehameha (JPN) 2001 | Manfath (IRE); 1991 | Pilot Bird (GB) | Blakeney |
| Sire King Kamehameha (JPN) 2001 | Manfath (IRE); 1991 | Pilot Bird (GB) | The Dancer (FR) |
| Dam La Dorada (JPN) 2006 | Symboli Kris S (USA); 1999 | Kris S | Roberto |
| Dam La Dorada (JPN) 2006 | Symboli Kris S (USA); 1999 | Kris S | Sharp Queen |
| Dam La Dorada (JPN) 2006 | Symboli Kris S (USA); 1999 | Tee Kay | Gold Meridian |
| Dam La Dorada (JPN) 2006 | Symboli Kris S (USA); 1999 | Tee Kay | Tri Argo |
| Dam La Dorada (JPN) 2006 | Lady Blond (USA); 1998 | Seeking The Gold | **Mr. Prospector** |
| Dam La Dorada (JPN) 2006 | Lady Blond (USA); 1998 | Seeking The Gold | Con Game |
| Dam La Dorada (JPN) 2006 | Lady Blond (USA); 1998 | Wind in Her Hair (IRE) | Alzao (USA) |
| Dam La Dorada (JPN) 2006 | Lady Blond (USA); 1998 | Wind in Her Hair (IRE) | Burghclere (GB) (family: 2-f) |

- Rey de Oro is inbred 3 × 4 to Mr. Prospector, meaning that this stallion appears in both the third and fourth generations of his pedigree.
