= King Kamehameha (horse) =

Japanese-bred Thoroughbred racehorse

King Kamehameha キングカメハメハ
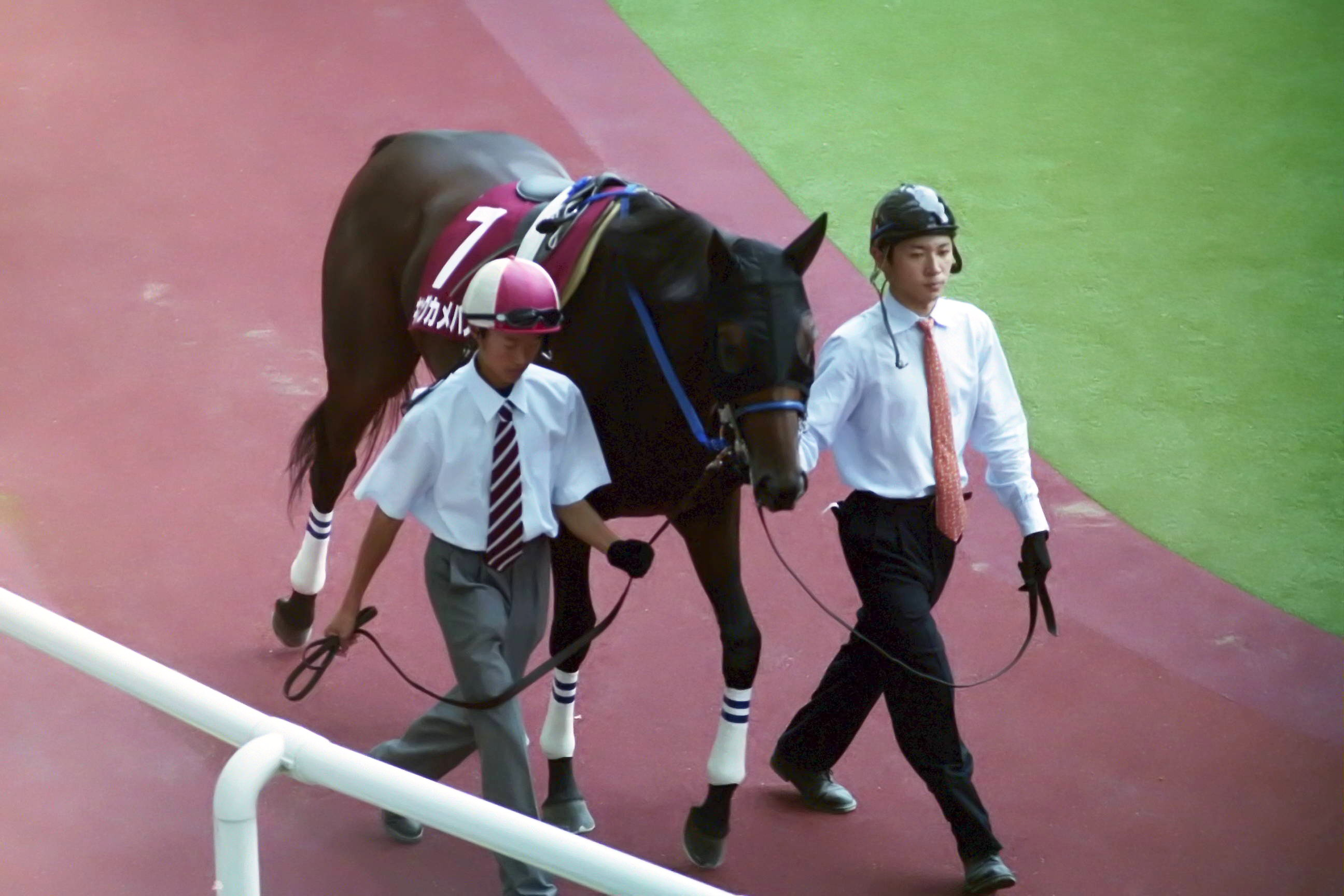
- King Kamehameha before his final race at Hanshin in September 2004
- Breed: Thoroughbred
- Sire: Kingmambo
- Grandsire: Mr. Prospector
- Dam: Manfath
- Damsire: Last Tycoon
- Sex: Stallion
- Foaled: March 20, 2001
- Died: August 10, 2019
- Country: Japan
- Colour: Bay
- Breeder: Northern Farm
- Owner: Makoto Kaneko
- Racing colours
- Trainer: Kunihide Matsuda
- Jockey: Katsumi Ando
- Record: 8: 7-0-1
- Earnings: ¥429,733,000

Major wins
- Mainichi Hai (2004); NHK Mile Cup (2004); Kobe Shimbun Hai (2004); Japanese Classic Race wins: Tokyo Yushun (2004)

Awards
- JRA Award for Best Three-Year-Old Colt (2004); Leading sire in Japan (2010, 2011); Leading broodmare sire in Japan (2020–2022)

Honours
- Japan Racing Association Hall of Fame (2024)

King Kamehameha (Japanese: キングカメハメハ, Hepburn: Kingu Kamehameha; March 20, 2001 – August 10, 2019) was a Japanese Thoroughbred racehorse and sire. After winning both of his races as a two-year-old, he established himself as the best colt of his generation in Japan in 2004 with a five-race winning streak including the Mainichi Hai, NHK Mile Cup, Tokyo Yushun and Kobe Shimbun Hai. After sustaining a tendon injury he was retired from racing with a record of seven wins and one third place from eight starts. He became one of the most successful breeding stallions in Japan winning two sires' championships.

== Background ==
King Kamehameha was a bay horse with no white markings bred in Japan by Northern Farm. His sire, Kingmambo was a highly successful breeding stallion. His progeny included the British Classic winners Russian Rhythm, King's Best, Henrythenavigator, Virginia Waters and Rule of Law as well as major winners in Japan (El Condor Pasa), France (Divine Proportions) and the United States (Lemon Drop Kid). King Kamehameha's dam Manfath, showed no discernible racing ability, failing to win in seven races in England in 1993 and 1994. Manfath did come from a successful female line: her great-great-grandmother Aimee was the ancestor of many major winners including Blushing Groom, Shareta and Encke.

Before foaling King Kamehameha, Manfath had produced The Deputy, a colt who won the Santa Anita Derby in 2000. Manfath was in foal to Kingmambo when she was offered for sale at Keeneland and sold for $600,000. She was exported to Japan where she produced King Kamehameha in the following spring. During his racing career the colt raced in the colours of Makoto Kaneko and was trained by Kunihide Matsuda. The colt was named after a 19th-century Hawaiian monarchy.

== Racing career ==
=== 2003: two-year-old season ===
King Kamehameha began his racing career in a maiden race at Kyoto Racecourse on 16 November and won from eleven opponents over 1800 metres. He then won the Erica Sho at over 2000 metres at Hanshin Racecourse in December.

=== 2004: three-year-old season ===
King Kamehameha began his second season by sustaining his only defeat when finishing third to Focal Point and Meiner Makros in the Grade 3 Keisei Hei over 2000 metres at Nakayama Racecourse on 17 January. He was moved up in distance to win the Sumire Stakes over 2200 metres at Hanshin in February and then recorded his first important success at the same course in March when he defeated Shell Game and Meiner Makros in the Grade 3 Mainichi Hai over 2000 metres. On 9 May the colt started favourite in an eighteen-runner field for the Grade 1 NHK Mile Cup over 1600 metres at Tokyo Racecourse. His closest rival in the betting was Seeking The Dia, colt who had won his last three races including the Arlington Cup and the New Zealand Trophy. Ridden by the veteran jockey Katsumi Ando he won by five lengths from Asahi Hai Futurity Stakes winner Cosmo Sunbeam with Meisho Bowler in third and Seeking The Dia seventh.

Three weeks after his win in the NHK Mile Cup King Kamehameha returned to Tokyo Racecourse and was stepped up in trip for the Tokyo Yushun (Japanese Derby) over 2400 metres in front of a crowd of 122,000. The colt's preparation for the race, moving up, down and up again in distance were described as being "in defiance of conventional training methods". Focal Point, Meiner Makros and Cosmo Sunbeam were again in opposition whilst other contenders in the eighteen-runner field included Heart's Cry, Daiwa Major and the popular Cosmo Bulk. With Ando again in the saddle, King Kamehameha was restrained in the early stages as Meiner Makros set a very fast pace and went ten lengths clear. King Kamehameha moved up on the final turn, took the lead 300 metres from the finish and won by one and a half lengths from Heart's Cry in a race record time of 2:23.3. After the race Ando said "It wasn't an easy race, but winning it was almost a given. This horse is something else".

On his only subsequent appearance, King Kamehameha ran in the Kobe Shimbun Hai over 2000 metres at Hanshin on 26 September. He won by one and a quarter lengths from Keiai Guard, with Heart's Cry the same distance away in third place. He was retired from racing after sustaining a tendon injury.

== Awards ==
In January 2005 King Kamehameha was voted champion Japanese three-year-old colt at the JRA Awards.

On June 4, 2024, he was inducted into the Japan Racing Association Hall of Fame.

== Stud record ==
King Kamehameha was retired from racing to become a breeding stallion at the Shadai Stallion Station after being syndicated at a value of $19 million, a record for a Japanese-trained horse. He achieved great success as a sire of winners and was twice the leading sire in Japan in 2010 and 2011. In early 2019 the stallion began to suffer from ill-health and in August his condition deteriorated. He died on 10 August at the age of 18.

=== Major winners ===
c = colt, f = filly

Foaled	Name	Sex	Major wins
2007	Rose Kingdom	c	Asahi Hai Futurity Stakes, Japan Cup
2007	Rulership	c	Queen Elizabeth II Cup
2007	Apapane	f	Hanshin Juvenile Fillies, Oka Shō, Yushun Himba, Shūka Shō, Victoria Mile
2008	Belshazzar	c	Japan Cup Dirt
2008	Lord Kanaloa	c	Sprinters Stakes (twice), Hong Kong Sprint (twice), Takamatsunomiya Kinen, Yasuda Kinen
2009	Hokko Tarumae	c	Champions Cup, Tokyo Daishōten (twice), Kawasaki Kinen (3 times), Teio Sho (twice)
2010	Lovely Day	c	Takarazuka Kinen, Tennō Shō (Autumn)
2012	Duramente	c	Satsuki Shō, Tōkyō Yūshun
2012	Let's Go Donki	f	Oka Shō
2013	Leontes	c	Asahi Hai Futurity Stakes
2013	Mikki Rocket	c	Takarazuka Kinen
2014	Rey de Oro	c	Tōkyō Yūshun, Tennō Shō (Autumn)
2015	Chuwa Wizard	c	Champions Cup
2017	Jun Light Bolt	c	Champions Cup
2018	Diktaean	g	Tokyo Daishōten
2018	Peptide Nile	c	February Stakes
2019	Stunning Rose	f	Shūka Shō, Queen Elizabeth II Cup

== Racing form ==
King Kamehameha won seven races and finished third once out of eight starts. This data is available based on JBIS and netkeiba.

Date	Racecourse	Race	Grade	Distance (Condition)	Entry	HN	Odds (Favored)	Finish	Time	Margins	Jockey	Winner (Runner-up)
2003 – two-year-old season
Nov 16	Kyoto	2yo Newcomer		1,800 m (Firm)	12	12	2.6 (1)	1st	1:50.5	–0.1	Katsumi Ando	(Universal)
Dec 13	Hanshin	Erica Sho	ALW (1W)	2,000 m (Firm)	12	5	2.2 (1)	1st	2:02.6	–0.1	Yutaka Take	(Great Basin)
2004 – three-year-old season
Jan 18	Nakayama	Keisei Hai	3	2,000 m (Firm)	10	4	2.3 (1)	3rd	2:00.0	0.8	Dario Vargiu	Focal Point
Feb 29	Hanshin	Sumire Stakes	OP	2,200 m (Soft)	7	7	1.7 (1)	1st	2:16.4	–0.4	Katsumi Ando	(Stratagem)
Mar 27	Hanshin	Mainichi Hai	3	2,000 m (Firm)	8	8	2.7 (2)	1st	2:01.2	–0.4	Yuichi Fukunaga	(Shell Game)
May 9	Tokyo	NHK Mile Cup	1	1,600 m (Firm)	18	13	3.6 (1)	1st	1:32.5	–0.8	Katsumi Ando	(Cosmo Sunbeam)
May 30	Tokyo	Tokyo Yushun	1	2,400 m (Firm)	18	12	2.6 (1)	1st	R2:23.3	–0.2	Katsumi Ando	(Heart's Cry)
Sep 26	Hanshin	Kobe Shimbun Hai	2	2,000 m (Firm)	8	7	1.5 (1)	1st	1:59.0	–0.2	Katsumi Ando	(Keiai Guard)

Legend:
Turf

- R on the time indicates that this was a record time

== Pedigree ==
Pedigree of King Kamehameha (JPN), bay stallion, 2001
Sire Kingmambo (USA) 1990	Mr. Prospector (USA); 1970	Raise a Native	Native Dancer
Sire Kingmambo (USA) 1990	Mr. Prospector (USA); 1970	Raise a Native	Raise You
Sire Kingmambo (USA) 1990	Mr. Prospector (USA); 1970	Gold Digger	Nashua
Sire Kingmambo (USA) 1990	Mr. Prospector (USA); 1970	Gold Digger	Sequence
Sire Kingmambo (USA) 1990	Miesque (USA); 1984	Nureyev	Northern Dancer
Sire Kingmambo (USA) 1990	Miesque (USA); 1984	Nureyev	Special
Sire Kingmambo (USA) 1990	Miesque (USA); 1984	Pasadoble	Prove Out
Sire Kingmambo (USA) 1990	Miesque (USA); 1984	Pasadoble	Santa Quilla
Dam Manfath (IRE) 1991	Last Tycoon (IRE); 1983	Try My Best	Northern Dancer
Dam Manfath (IRE) 1991	Last Tycoon (IRE); 1983	Try My Best	Sex Appeal
Dam Manfath (IRE) 1991	Last Tycoon (IRE); 1983	Mill Princess	Mill Reef
Dam Manfath (IRE) 1991	Last Tycoon (IRE); 1983	Mill Princess	Irish Lass
Dam Manfath (IRE) 1991	Pilot Bird (GB); 1983	Blakeney	Hethersett
Dam Manfath (IRE) 1991	Pilot Bird (GB); 1983	Blakeney	Windmill Girl
Dam Manfath (IRE) 1991	Pilot Bird (GB); 1983	The Dancer	Green Dancer
Dam Manfath (IRE) 1991	Pilot Bird (GB); 1983	The Dancer	Khazaeen (Family: 22-d)

- King Kamehameha was inbred 4 × 4 to Northern Dancer, meaning that this stallion appears twice in the fourth generation of his pedigree.

== See also ==
- List of racehorses
