= 2019 Prix de l'Arc de Triomphe =

98th Prix de l'Arc de Triomphe
- Prix de l'Arc de Triomphe
- Location: Longchamp Racecourse
- Date: 6 October 2019
- Winning horse: Waldgeist
- Jockey: Pierre-Charles Boudot
- Trainer: André Fabre (FR)

The 2019 Prix de l'Arc de Triomphe was a horse race held at Longchamp Racecourse on Sunday 6 October 2019. It was the 98th running of the Prix de l'Arc de Triomphe. The race was won by Gestut Ammerland & Newsells Park's five-year-old horse Waldgeist, trained in France by André Fabre and ridden by Pierre-Charles Boudot. It was a record-breaking eighth win in the race for Fabre after the victories of Trempolino, Subotica, Carnegie, Peintre Celebre, Sagamix, Hurricane Run and Rail Link. Both the owners and jockey were winning the race for the first time. Waldgeist became the first French-trained five-year-old to win the Arc since Le Paillon in 1947.

== The contenders ==
The five-year-old British-trained mare Enable was attempting to record an unprecedented third victory in the race after winning in 2017 and 2018 and appeared as good as ever after taking the Eclipse Stakes and the King George VI and Queen Elizabeth Stakes in summer. The only other British runner was the lightly raced four-year-old Ghaiyyath who had won the Grosser Preis von Baden by fourteen lengths on his most recent start. France appeared to have two strong contenders in the three-year-old colt Sottsass (winner of the Prix du Jockey Club) and the five-year-old Waldgeist (Grand Prix de Saint-Cloud, Prix Ganay). The other two home runners French King and Soft Light were given little chance.

Japan was represented by the four-year-old colts Blast Onepiece (Arima Kinen) and Fierement (Tenno Sho), as well as the five-year-okd Kiseki (Kikuka Sho), but none of the trio was particularly well fancied. The Irish contingent consisted of two runners from the Aidan O'Brien stable. The stable jockey Ryan Moore opted to ride the International Stakes winner Japan while the four-year-old filly Magical (Irish Champion Stakes) was partnered by the trainer's son Donnacha. The twelfth runner was Nagano Gold from the Czech Republic.

Enable was made the 1/2 favourite ahead of Sottsass on 6.6/1 with Japan on 9/1, Ghaiyyath on 13/1 and Waldgeist on 13.1/1.

== The race ==
Ghaiyyath started well from an outside draw, took the lead soon after the start and set the pace from Fierement and Magical with Enable settling in fourth place while the other leading contenders Japan, Sottsass and Waldgeist raced in mid-division. Ghaiyyath began to tire on the soft ground approaching the final turn and with 500 metres left Magical went to the front from Enable with Sottsass, Japan and Waldgeist moving into contention on the outside. Enable gained the advantage 400 metres out and looked likely to win after repelling the challenges of Sottsass and Japan. Waldgeist however, maintained his challenge on the wide outside, caught the mare inside the last 50 metres and was finishing to such effect that he had drawn away to win by one and three quarter lengths at the line. Sottsass took third ahead of Japan, with the rest of the field finishing strung out at long intervals.

== Full result ==
Pos.	Marg.	Horse	Age	Jockey	Trainer (Country)
1		Waldgeist	5	Pierre-Charles Boudot	André Fabre (FR)
2	1¾	Enable	5	Frankie Dettori	John Gosden (GB)
3	3½	Sottsass	3	Cristian Demuro	Jean-Claude Rouget (FR)
4	½	Japan	3	Ryan Moore	Aidan O'Brien (IRE)
5	6	Magical	4	Donnacha O'Brien	Aidan O'Brien (IRE)
6	3½	Soft Light	3	Yutaka Take	Jean-Claude Rouget (FR)
7	8	Kiseki	5	Christophe Soumillon	Katsuhiko Sumii (JPN)
8	4½	Nagano Gold	5	Mickael Barzalona	Vaclav Luka (CZE)
9	4½	French King	4	Olivier Peslier	Henri-Alex Pantall (FR)
10	2½	Ghaiyyath	4	William Buick	Charlie Appleby (GB)
11	ns	Blast Onepiece	4	Yuga Kawada	Masahiro Otake (JPN)
12	15	Fierement	4	Christophe Lemaire	Takahisa Tezuka (JPN)

- Abbreviations: ns = nose; shd = short-head; hd = head; snk = short neck; nk = neck

== Race details ==
- Sponsor: Qatar Racing and Equestrian Club
- Purse:€5,000,000
- Going: Very Soft
- Distance: 2,400 metres
- Number of runners: 12
- Winner's time: 2:31.97
