= Lucky Lilac =

Japanese Thoroughbred racehorse

Lucky Lilac ラッキーライラック
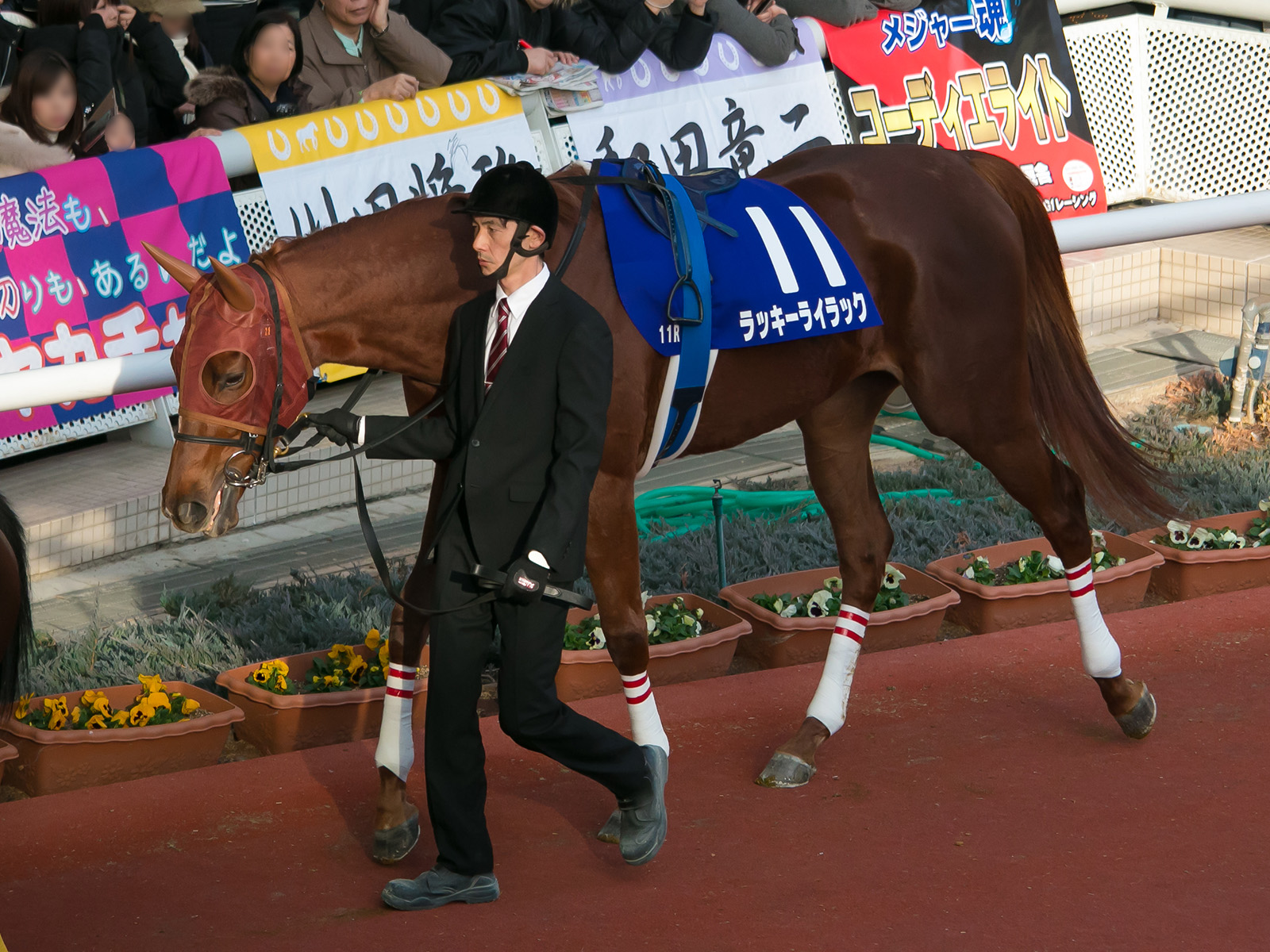
- Lucky Lilac in December 2017.
- Breed: Thoroughbred
- Sire: Orfevre
- Grandsire: Stay Gold
- Dam: Lilacs and Lace
- Damsire: Flower Alley
- Sex: Mare
- Foaled: April 3, 2015 (age 11)
- Country: Japan
- Colour: Chestnut
- Breeder: Northern Farm
- Owner: Sunday Racing
- Racing colours
- Trainer: Mikio Matsunaga
- Jockey: Shu Ishibashi; Mirco Demuro
- Record: 19: 7-4-3
- Earnings: ¥737,467,000 + HK$4,400,000 (ca. $7,274,854)

Major wins
- Artemis Stakes (2017); Hanshin Juvenile Fillies (2017); Tulip Sho (2018); Queen Elizabeth II Cup (2019, 2020); Osaka Hai (2020)

Awards
- JRA Award for Best Two-Year-Old Filly (2017)

Lucky Lilac (Japanese: ラッキーライラック, Hepburn: Rakkii Rairakku; foaled 3 April 2015) is a retired Japanese Thoroughbred racehorse and active broodmare. As a two-year-old in 2017 she was undefeated in three races including the Artemis Stakes and Hanshin Juvenile Fillies and took the JRA Award for Best Two-Year-Old Filly. In the following year she won the Tulip Sho and was placed in both the Oka Sho and the Yushun Himba. In 2019 she won the Queen Elizabeth II Cup and finished second in the Hong Kong Vase. As a five-year-old in 2020 she defeated male opponents to win the Osaka Hai and recorded a second victory in the Queen Elizabeth II Cup. She has earned more than $7 million in prize money.

== Background ==
Lucky Lilac is a chestnut mare with a narrow white blaze bred in Hokkaido by Northern Farm. She was sent into training with Mikio Matsunaga and raced in the black, red and yellow colours of Sunday Racing. She is an unusually large female Thoroughbred, weighing as much as 524 kg during her racing career.

She was from the first crop of foals sired by Orfevre, who was the Japanese Horse of the Year in 2011 and whose wins included the Satsuki Sho, Tokyo Yushun, Kikuka Sho, Arima Kinen and Takarazuka Kinen. Orfevre's other progeny include the Satsuki Sho winner Epoca d'Oro. Lucky Lilac's dam, Lilacs And Lace showed top-class form as a three-year-old in the United States in 2011, winning the California Oaks and the Ashland Stakes. She was a granddaughter of the Acorn Stakes winner Stella Madrid who was in turn a daughter of the outstanding female sprinter My Juliet.

== Racing career ==
=== 2017: two-year-old season ===
Lucky Lilac was ridden in most of her early races by Shu Ishibashi. On her racecourse debut she contested an event for previously unraced juveniles over 1600 metres at Niigata Racecourse on 20 August and won from Lavacourt and sixteen others. The filly was then stepped up in class for the Grade 3 Artemis Stakes over the same distance at Tokyo Racecourse on 28 October. Starting the 3.4/1 second favourite behind Tosen Bliss in a fifteen-runner field she won by three quarters of a length from Sayakachan.

On 10 December Lucky Lilac was moved up to the highest level to contest the Grade 1 Hanshin Juvenile Fillies over 1600 metres at Hanshin Racecourse and started the 3.1/1 second choice in the betting behind the Sapporo Nisai Stakes winner Rock This Town. The other fancied contenders in the eighteen runner field included Lily Noble, Mau Lea, Social Club, Cordierite, Tosen Bliss and Sayakachan. Lucky Lilac was settled in mid division towards the outside as the Las Emociones set the pace from Cordierite. Entering the straight the leaders began to fade and Lily Noble went to the front but Lucky Lilac produced a sustained run on the outside, gained the advantage in the last 200 metres and won by three quarters of a length with Mau Lea taking third place. After the race Ishibashi commented "She was a bit keen in her last start but was very relaxed today. We were in a good striking position at the top of the stretch which gave me all the confidence I needed. Her physical ability is extremely high and she is very intelligent too."

In the official ratings for Japanese two-year-olds, Lucky Lilac was rated the best juvenile filly of the year, two pounds ahead of Lily Noble and six pounds below the top-rated colt Danon Premium. In January 2018 Lucky Lilac was unanimously voted Best Two-Year-Old Filly at the JRA Awards for 2017.

=== 2018: three-year-old season ===
Lucky Lilac began her second campaign in the Grade 2 Tulip Sho (a major trial race for the Oka Sho) over 1600 metres at Hanshin on 3 March. She was made the odds-on favourite and won by two lengths and a neck from Mau Lea and Lily Noble. Her trainer Mikio Matsunaga commented "she was able to demonstrate her strength and ability, and looking ahead we could take a lot from that. She has good natural speed, does her work well, and because she's relaxed we can train her as we'd like".

On 8 April the filly started 4/5 favourite in a seventeen-runner field for the 78th edition of Oka Sho at Hanshin. After racing in fourth place she took the lead in the straight but sustained her first defeat as she was overtaken in the final strides and beaten a length and three quarters into second place by Almond Eye. Lucky Lilac was moved up in distance and started second favourite for the Yushun Himba at Tokyo on 20 May. She tracked the leaders before making steady progress in the straight and finishing third behind Almond Eye and Lily Noble.

After a break of over four and a half months, Lucky Lilac returned for the Shuka Sho over 2000 metres at Kyoto Racecourse on 14 October. Plans to give her a warm-up race had been shelved after she sustained an injury to her right hind leg. Ridden by Yuichi Kitamura she was the second choice in the betting but failed to reproduce her best form and came home ninth of the seventeen runners.

In the official ratings for Japanese three-year-olds Lucky Lilac was rated alongside Lily Noble and Mikki Charm as the second-best three-year-old filly of the year, thirteen pounds behind Almond Eye.

=== 2019: four-year-old season ===
On 24 February 2019 Lucky Lilac was matched against male opposition when she contested the Grade 2 Nakayama Kinen. After racing in second place behind Maltese Apogee she took the lead in the straight and opened up a clear advantage but was caught on the line and beaten a neck by the five-year-old Win Bright. In April the filly started odds-on favourite for the Hanshin Himba Stakes and came home eighth in a blanket finish, beaten less than two lengths by the winner Mikki Charm. Despite five consecutive defeats Lucky Lilac was made the 3.3/1 favourite for a strong renewal of the Victoria Mile at Tokyo on 12 May. She tracked the front-running Aerolithe before launching a strong challenge on the outside but in another close finish she was beaten into fourth place behind Normcore, Primo Scene and Crocosmia.

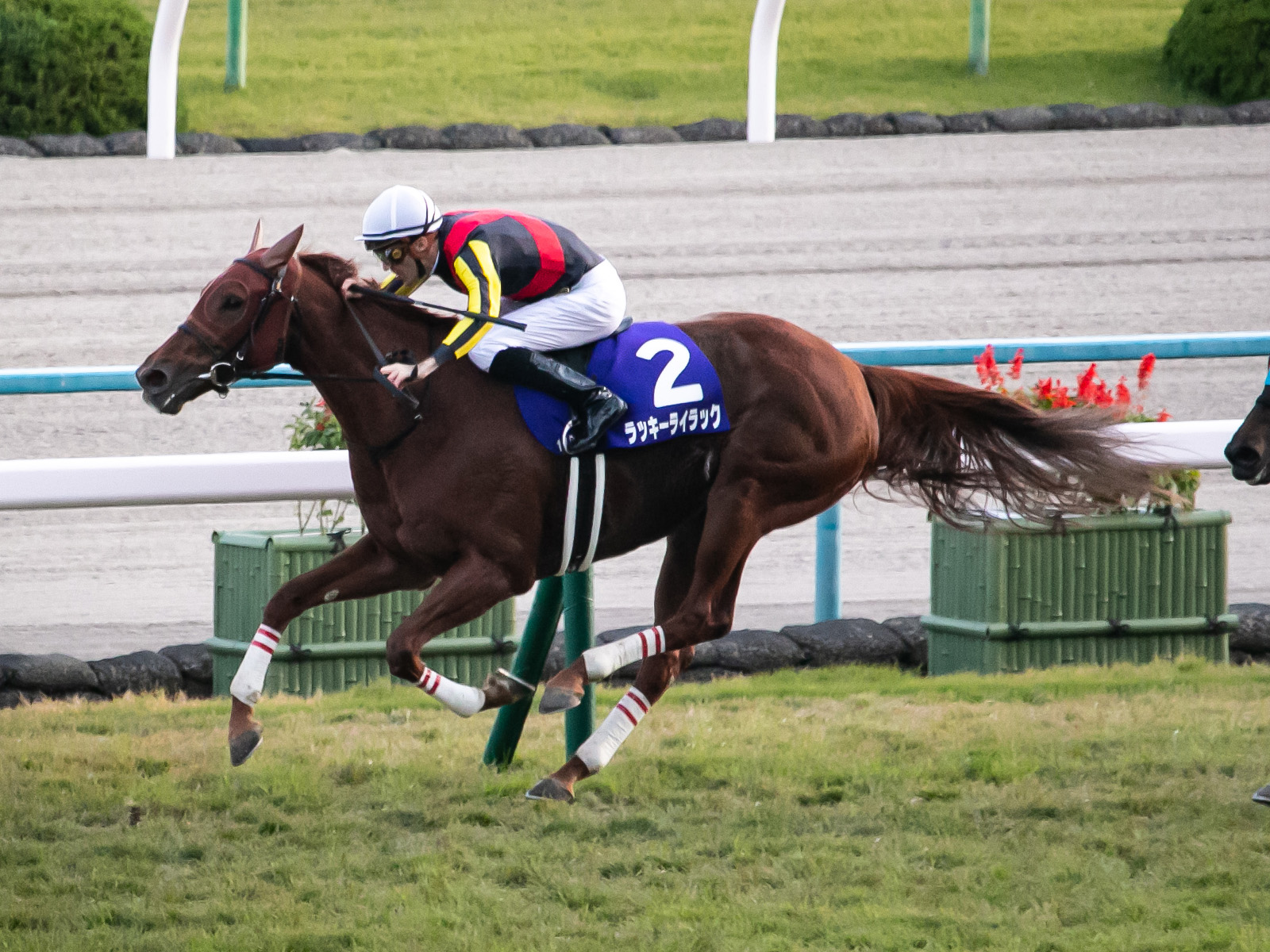
Lucky Lilac wins the Queen Elizabeth II Cup in 2019

Lucky Lilac returned from her summer break to contest the Grade 2 Fuchu Himba Stakes over 1800 metres at Tokyo on 14 October and finished third behind Scarlet Color and Frontier Queen. Christophe Soumillon took over from Ishibashi for the filly's next race, the Grade 1 Queen Elizabeth II Cup on 10 November at Kyoto in which she started the 4.4/1 third choice in the betting behind the three-year-olds Loves Only You and Chrono Genesis. Her other fifteen opponents included Crocosmia, Scarlet Color and Frontier Queen. She settled on the inside in mid division as Crocosmia set the pace from Loves Only You, before making rapid progress in the straight, overtaking Crocosmia 100 metres from the finish and winning by one and a quarter lengths. After the race Soumillon said "I was very confident when I saw how good she was in training but today she was even better. She was really concentrating and I saw she was reacting very fast... The pace was not very fast so I thought it would be a little bit hard to make up ground, but finally I took the option to stay in the inside and she really quickened well and at the 200-meter marker when I saw the gap was still open".

On her final appearance of the year Lucky Lilac was sent to Sha Tin Racecourse for the Hong Kong Vase over 2400 metres in December. With Soumillon again in the saddle she produced a strong late run from the rear of the field to finish second of the fourteen runners behind her fellow Japanese challenger Glory Vase.

=== 2020: five-year-old season ===
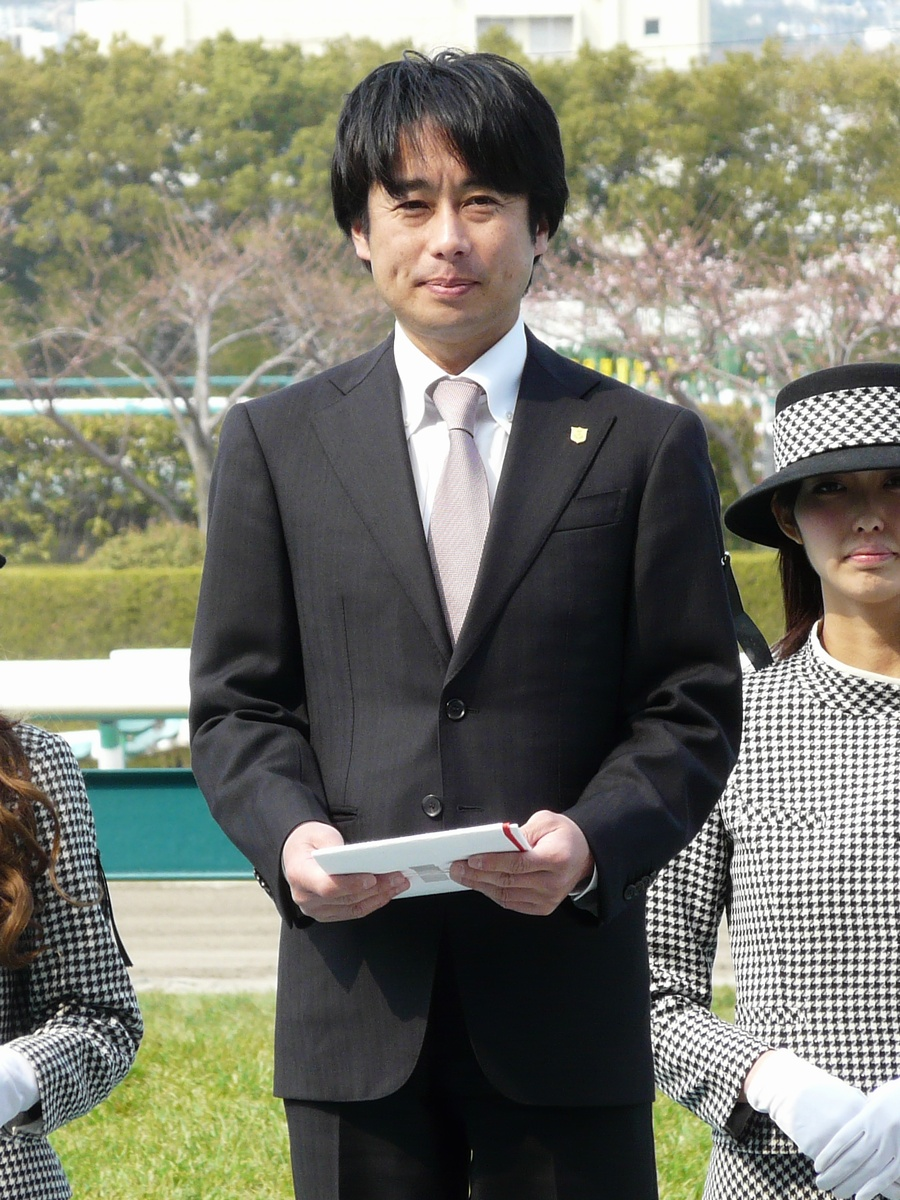
Lucky Lilac's trainer Mikio Matsunaga

Lucky Lilac was ridden in her first four races as a five-year-old by Mirco Demuro. She began her fourth campaign on 1 March when she started the 2/1 second favourite for the Nakayama Kinen and finished second behind the four-year-old colt Danon Kingly, beaten one and three quarter lengths by the winner. By the time the mare made her next appearance, in the Grade 1 Osaka Hai over 2000 metres at Hanshin on 5 April, horse races in Japan were being run behind closed doors owing to the COVID-19 pandemic. She went off the 3.1/1 second favourite behind Danon Kingly in a twelve-runner field which also included Blast Onepiece, Chrono Genesis, Wagnerian and Makahiki. She settled in third place on the inside as Danon Kingly set the from Jinambo but looked to be short of racing room as the field entered the straight. When Jinambo dropped back however, Demuro angled Lucky Lilac to the left and the mare gained the advantage in the closing stages to win by a neck from Chrono Genesis with Danon Kingly a further neck away in third. After the race Demuro said "Lucky Lilac was well prepared for coming into this race... she was definitely very strong and fit this time. She was really sharp coming out of the gate and we were a little forwardly positioned than expected but the race went perfectly for us and she was really concentrating and taking the bit after the third corner. We were lucky to find a nice opening at the stretch. She's a mare but a not timid and has the strength to face the top males in the future."

On softer ground at the same track on 28 June Lucky Lilac started the 3.9/1 third favourite for the 2200 metre Takarazuka Kinen. She raced in third place before taking the lead in the straight but tired in the closing stages and came home sixth behind Chrono Genesis. In the Grade 2 Sapporo Kinen over 2000 metres Sapporo Racecourse in August she started odds-on favourite but after gaining the advantage in the straight she was run down in the closing stages and finished third behind Normcore and Persian Knight.

At Kyoto on 15 November Lucky Lilac attempted to become the fourth horse after Mejiro Dober, Admire Groove and Snow Fairy to win a second Queen Elizabeth II Cup and started the 2.3/1 favourite ahead of Normcore and Loves Only You in an eighteen-runner field which also included Centelleo (Sankei Sho All Comers), Salacia (Fuchu Himba Stakes), Ria Amelia (Rose Stakes) and Win Marilyn (Flora Stakes). Partnered by Christophe Lemaire, she started well and settled in around twelfth place as Normcore set the pace. She made good progress on the outside approaching the final turn, went to the front 300 metres from the finish and kept on well to win by a neck from Salacia, with Loves Only You the same distance back in third.. Breaking smoothly from the outermost draw, Lucky Lilac settled in mid-division behind Loves Only You, around 12th from the front, edged forward toward the end of the backstretch and continued to advance turning the corners wide. The defending champion immediately made bid entering the corner, assumed command 300 meters out and held off the strong charges from behind in the last 100 meters to cross the wire a neck in front. Lemaire commented "We were able to race smoothly and advance our position from the third corner. She was very composed and gave her usual turn of speed. We took the front early in the stretch but she held on well until the end. She's a strong horse. She has been racing at the top level since her two-year-old season and I had confidence in her."

On 27 December Lucky Lilac started the 7.1/1 fourth favourite for the Arima Kinen at Nakayama after finishing second to Chrono Genesis in the poll to select the runners. She raced in mid-division towards the outside before staking on in the straight to come home fourth behind Chrono Genesis, Salacia and Fierement.

== Breeding career ==
Following her retirement from racing, Lucky Lilac became a broodmare at Northern Farm.

c = colt, f = filly

No.	Name	Foaled	Sex	Color	Sire	Wins	Races	Remarks
1st	(Lucky Lilac 2022)	2022	f	Dark Bay	Rey de Oro			
	(not foaled)	2023			Epiphaneia			
2rd	Lucky Sparkle	2024	c	Dark Bay	Epiphaneia	0	1	Active
3th	(Lucky Lilac 2025)	2025	c	Bay	Kitasan Black			
4th	(Lucky Lilac 2026)	2026	f	Bay	Equinox			

== In popular culture ==
An anthropomorphized version of Lucky Lilac appears as a character in the Japanese multimedia franchise Umamusume: Pretty Derby, voiced by Yuki Nakashima. She is a girl from Kansai who enjoys stand-up comedy and regularly tries to hide her upbringing by speaking in a Tokyo dialect and maintaining a composed demeanor, but slips up on occasion and reverts to her native Kansai dialect. She regularly monologues internally about events happening around her, usually when she is frustrated or confused by the absurdity displayed by Tracen Academy's student body, and is frequently exasperated by her rival, Almond Eye, due to her overly competitive behavior.

== Racing form ==
Lucky Lilac won seven races in 19 starts. This data is based on JBIS, netkeiba and HKJC.

Date	Track	Race	Grade	Distance (Condition)	Entry	HN	Odds (Favored)	Finish	Time	Margins	Jockey	Winner (Runner-up)
2017 – two-year-old season
Aug 20	Niigata	2yo Newcomer		1,600 m (Firm)	18	8	4.3 (2)	1st	1:36.4	–0.2	Shu Ishibashi	(Lavacourt)
Oct 28	Tokyo	Artemis Stakes	3	1,600 m (Firm)	15	13	4.4 (2)	1st	1:34.9	–0.1	Shu Ishibashi	(Sayakachan)
Dec 10	Hanshin	Hanshin Juvenile Fillies	1	1,600 m (Firm)	18	11	4.1 (2)	1st	1:34.3	–0.1	Shu Ishibashi	(Lily Noble)
2018 – three-year-old season
Mar 3	Hanshin	Tulip Sho	2	1,600 m (Firm)	10	5	1.8 (1)	1st	1:33.4	–0.3	Shu Ishibashi	(Mau Lea)
Apr 8	Hanshin	Oka Sho	1	1,600 m (Firm)	17	1	1.8 (1)	2nd	1:33.4	0.3	Shu Ishibashi	Almond Eye
May 20	Tokyo	Yushun Himba	1	2,400 m (Firm)	17	2	4.1 (2)	3rd	2:24.4	0.6	Shu Ishibashi	Almond Eye
Oct 14	Kyoto	Shuka Sho	1	2,000 m (Firm)	17	7	7.3 (2)	9th	1:59.3	0.8	Yuichi Kitamura	Almond Eye
2019 – four-year-old season
Feb 24	Nakayama	Nakayama Kinen	2	1,800 m (Firm)	11	3	8.6 (6)	2nd	1:45.5	0.0	Shu Ishibashi	Win Bright
Apr 4	Hanshin	Hanshin Himba Stakes	2	1,600 m (Firm)	14	4	1.5 (1)	8th	1:33.8	0.2	Shu Ishibashi	Mikki Charm
May 12	Tokyo	Victoria Mile	1	1,600 m (Firm)	18	6	4.3 (1)	4th	1:30.6	0.1	Shu Ishibashi	Normcore
Oct 14	Tokyo	Ireland Trophy	2	1,800 m (Good)	15	15	3.9 (2)	3rd	1:44.8	0.3	Shu Ishibashi	Scarlet Color
Nov 10	Kyoto	QEII Cup	1	2,200 m (Firm)	18	2	5.4 (3)	1st	2:14.1	–0.2	Christophe Soumillon	(Crocosmia)
Dec 8	Sha Tin	Hong Kong Vase	1	2,400 m (Firm)	14	11	5.3 (2)	2nd	2:25.3	0.5	Christophe Soumillon	Glory Vase
2020 – five-year-old season
Mar 1	Nakayama	Nakayama Kinen	2	1,800 m (Firm)	9	7	3.0 (2)	2nd	1:46.6	0.3	Mirco Demuro	Danon Kingly
Apr 5	Hanshin	Osaka Hai	1	2,000 m (Firm)	12	5	4.1 (2)	1st	1:58.4	0.0	Mirco Demuro	(Chrono Genesis)
Jun 28	Hanshin	Takarazuka Kinen	1	2,200 m (Good)	18	11	4.9 (3)	6th	2:16.0	2.5	Mirco Demuro	Chrono Genesis
Aug 23	Sapporo	Sapporo Kinen	2	2,000 m (Firm)	12	6	1.9 (1)	3rd	1:59.8	0.4	Mirco Demuro	Normcore
Nov 15	Hanshin	QEII Cup	1	2,200 m (Firm)	18	18	3.3 (1)	1st	2:10.3	–0.1	Christophe Lemaire	(Salacia)
Dec 27	Nakayama	Arima Kinen	1	2,500 m (Firm)	16	7	8.1 (4)	4th	2:35.5	0.5	Yuichi Fukunaga	Chrono Genesis

Legend:
Turf

== Pedigree ==
Pedigree of Lucky Lilac (JPN), chestnut mare 2015
Sire Orfevre (JPN) 2008	Stay Gold (JPN); 1994	Sunday Silence (USA)	Halo
Sire Orfevre (JPN) 2008	Stay Gold (JPN); 1994	Sunday Silence (USA)	Wishing Well
Sire Orfevre (JPN) 2008	Stay Gold (JPN); 1994	Golden Sash	Dictus (FR)
Sire Orfevre (JPN) 2008	Stay Gold (JPN); 1994	Golden Sash	Dyna Sash
Sire Orfevre (JPN) 2008	Oriental Art (JPN); 1997	Mejiro McQueen	Mejiro Titan
Sire Orfevre (JPN) 2008	Oriental Art (JPN); 1997	Mejiro McQueen	Mejiro Aurora
Sire Orfevre (JPN) 2008	Oriental Art (JPN); 1997	Electro Art	Northern Taste (CAN)
Sire Orfevre (JPN) 2008	Oriental Art (JPN); 1997	Electro Art	Grandma Stevens (USA)
Dam Lilacs and Lace (USA) 2008	Flower Alley (USA); 2002	Distorted Humor	Forty Niner
Dam Lilacs and Lace (USA) 2008	Flower Alley (USA); 2002	Distorted Humor	Danzig's Beauty
Dam Lilacs and Lace (USA) 2008	Flower Alley (USA); 2002	Princess Olivia	Lycius
Dam Lilacs and Lace (USA) 2008	Flower Alley (USA); 2002	Princess Olivia	Dance Image (IRE)
Dam Lilacs and Lace (USA) 2008	Refinement (USA); 1994	Seattle Slew	Bold Reasoning
Dam Lilacs and Lace (USA) 2008	Refinement (USA); 1994	Seattle Slew	My Charmer
Dam Lilacs and Lace (USA) 2008	Refinement (USA); 1994	Stella Madrid	Alydar
Dam Lilacs and Lace (USA) 2008	Refinement (USA); 1994	Stella Madrid	My Juliet (Family: 6-a)
