= Chrono Genesis =

Japanese Thoroughbred racehorse

Chrono Genesis クロノジェネシス
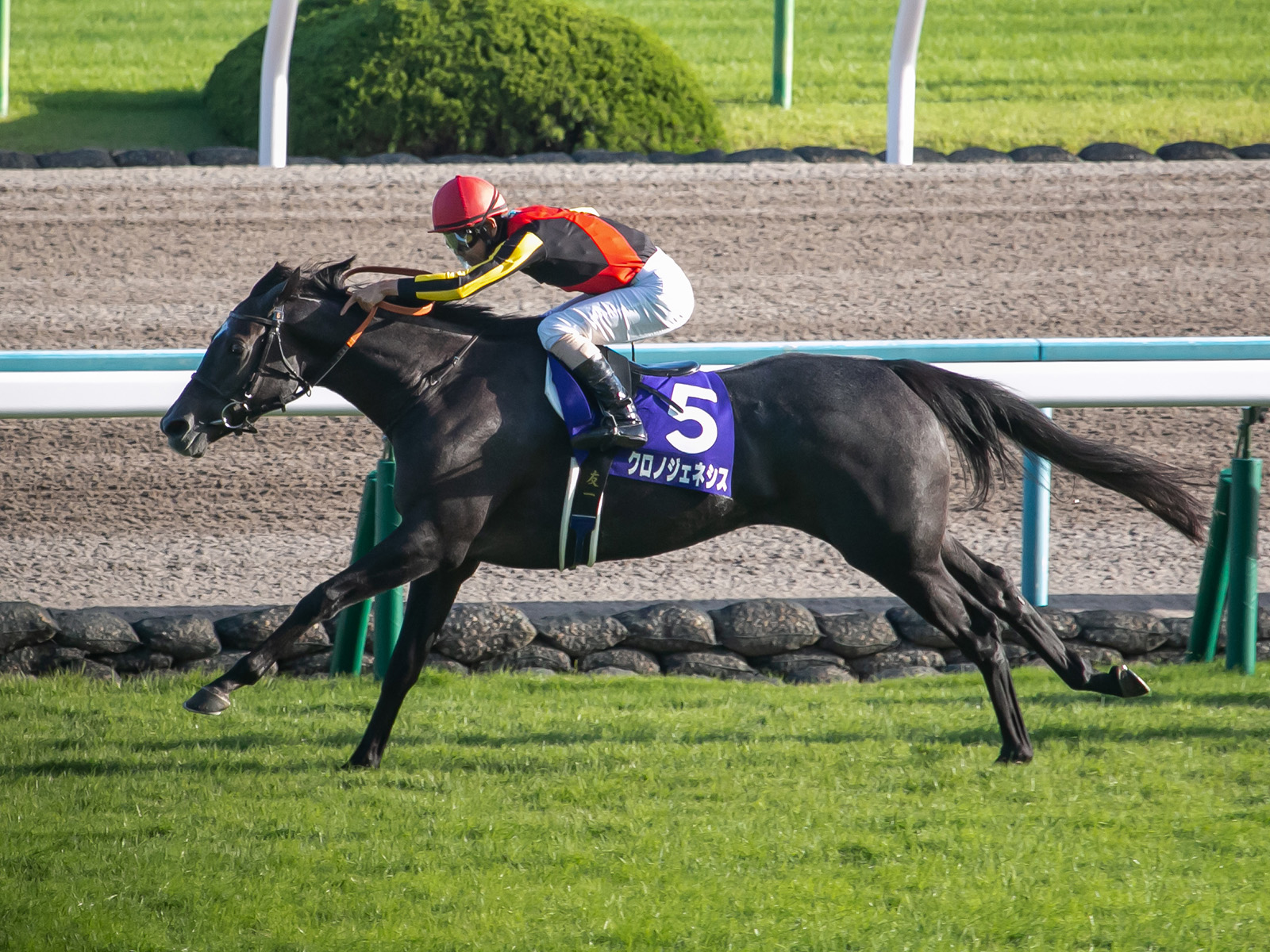
- Chrono Genesis in October 2019
- Breed: Thoroughbred
- Sire: Bago
- Grandsire: Nashwan
- Dam: Chronologist
- Damsire: Kurofune
- Sex: Mare
- Foaled: 6 March 2016 (age 10)
- Country: Japan
- Colour: Grey
- Breeder: Northern Farm
- Owner: Sunday Racing, Carcone Holdings
- Racing colours
- Trainer: Takashi Saito
- Jockey: Yuichi Kitamura; Christophe Lemaire
- Record: 17: 8-3-4
- Earnings: 1,247,354,000 JPN; Japan : 1,117,140,000 JPN; UAE : 1,000,000 USD

Major wins
- Queen Cup (2019); Kyoto Kinen (2020); Takarazuka Kinen (2020, 2021); Arima Kinen (2020); Japanese Classic Tiara Race wins: Shuka Sho (2019)

Awards
- JRA Special Award (2020)

Honours
- Timeform rating: 128

Chrono Genesis (Japanese: クロノジェネシス, Hepburn: Kurono Geneshisu; foaled 6 March 2016) is a retired Japanese Thoroughbred racehorse and broodmare. She was one of the best two-year-old fillies in Japan when she won her first two races including the Ivy Stakes and then ran a close second in the Hanshin Juvenile Fillies. In the following year she won the Queen Cup and then contested all three legs of the Japanese Fillies' Triple Crown, finishing third in both the Oka Sho and the Yushun Himba before winning the Shuka Sho. As a four-year-old, she won the Kyoto Kinen, Takarazuka Kinen, and Arima Kinen.

== Background ==
Chrono Genesis is a grey mare with a white star bred in Hokkaido by Northern Farm. She was sent into training with Takashi Saito at Rittō, Shiga and carries the red, black and yellow colours of Sunday Racing. She was ridden in most of her races by Yuichi Kitamura.

She was from the tenth crop of foals sired by Bago, an outstanding middle-distance runner in Europe whose biggest win came in the 2004 Prix de l'Arc de Triomphe. As a breeding stallion in Japan he started well but became disappointing: Chrono Genesis was his first Grade 1 winner since Big Week won the Kikuka Sho in 2010. Chrono Genesis's dam Chronologist, from whom she inherited her grey colour, showed modest racing ability, winning one minor race as a three-year-old in 2006. but as a broodmare she also produced Normcore. She was descended from the American broodmare Nimble Doll (foaled 1952), making her a distant relative of Captain Steve.

== Racing career ==
=== 2018: two-year-old season ===
Chrono Genesis began her racing career by winning an event for previously unraced juveniles over 1800 metres at Kokura Racecourse on 2 September. On 20 October she was stepped up in class for the Listed Ivy Stakes over the same distance at Tokyo Racecourse when she was the only filly in a ten-runner field and won by two lengths from Cosmo Calendula. Saito later commented "She waited patiently and went all out in the final stages and displayed the kind of kick we thought she would from her morning work". On 9 December the filly was moved up to the highest level for the Grade 1 Hanshin Juvenile Fillies over 1600 metres at Hanshin Racecourse and started the 2.6/1 second favourite in an eighteen-runner field. After starting slowly she was towards the rear for most of the race before making rapid progress in the straight and finishing second to the favoured Danon Fantasy, beaten half a length by the winner.

In the official ratings for Japanese two-year-olds Chrono Genesis was rated the second best juvenile filly of the year, one pound behind Danon Fantasy and six pounds below the top-rated colt Admire Mars.

=== 2019: three-year-old season ===
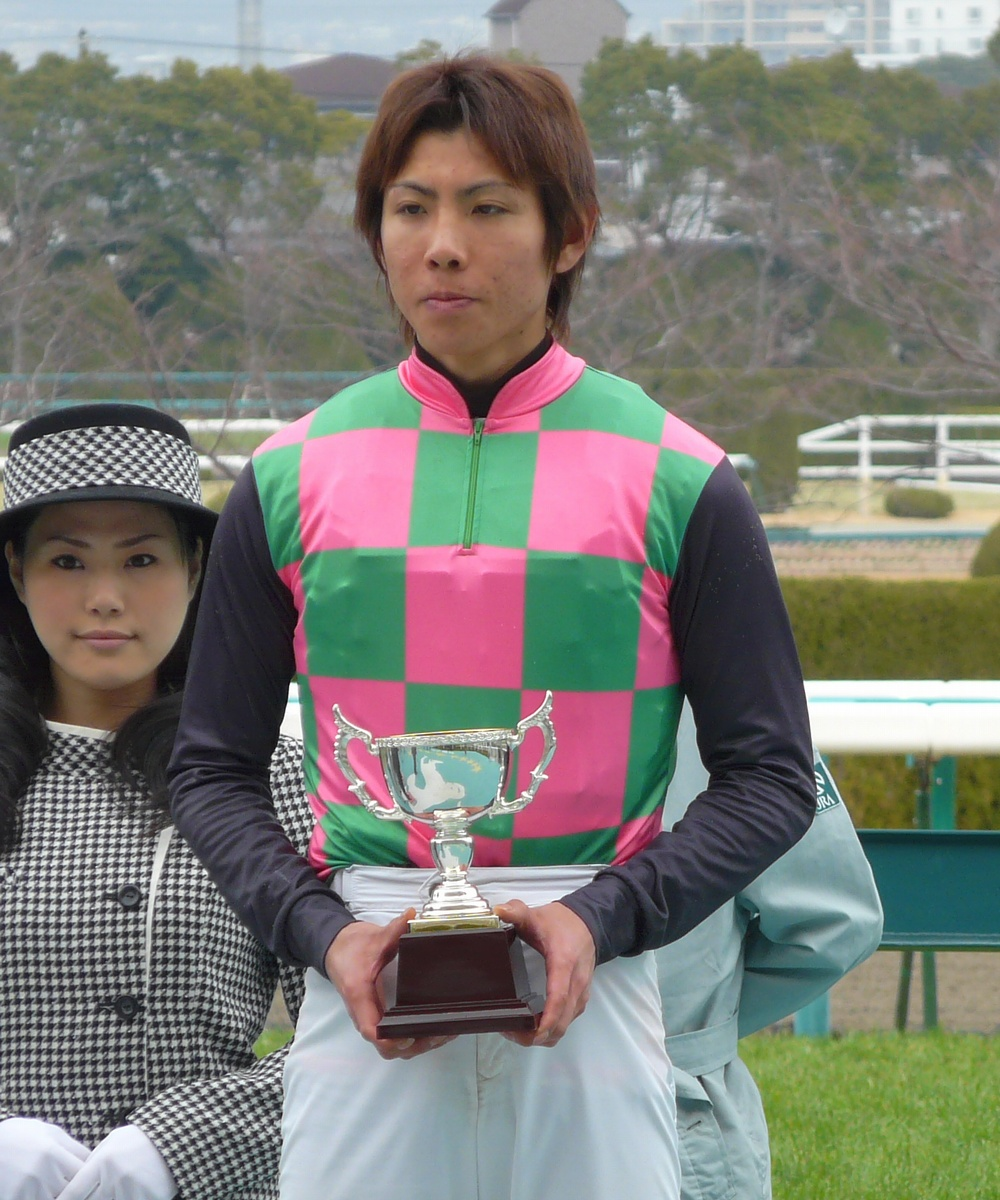
Chrono Genesis's regular jockey Yuichi Kitamura

On her first appearance as a three-year-old Chrono Genesis started 1.1/1 favourite for the Grade 2 Daily High Queen Cup (a trial for the Oka Sho) over 1800 metres at Toyo on 11 February. She came from sixth place on the final turn to win by a neck and half a length from Beach Samba and Jodie. In the Oka Sho over 1600 metres at Hanshin on 7 April the filly started the 4.7/1 third choice in the betting behind Danon Fantasy and Gran Alegria. After racing in mid-division Chrono Genesis was switched to the outside and produced a "powerful turn of speed" to take third place behind Gran Alegria and Shigeru Pink Dia. On 19 May at Tokyo Chrono Genesis was moved up in distance and made the second favourite behind Loves Only You for the 2400 metre Yushun Himba. She raced just behind the leaders for most of the way before keeping on well in the straight but never looked likely to win and finished third behind Loves Only You and the 93.1/1 outsider Curren Bouquetd'Or.

After a break of almost five months Chrono Genesis returned for the Shuka Sho over 2000 metres at Kyoto Racecourse on 13 October and started the 5.9/1 fourth choice in the betting behind Danon Fantasy, Curren Bouquetd'Or and Espoir. The other thirteen runners included Beach Samba, Shigeru Pink Dia, Contra Check (Flower Cup), Passing Through (Shion Stakes) and Schon Glanz (Artemis Stakes). Chrono Genesis settled behind the leaders as Danon Fantasy set the pace before being switched to the outside in the straight and launching a sustained run. She took the lead 200 metres from the finish and drew away in the closing stages to win by two lengths from Curren Bouquetd'Or with a further length and half back to Shigeru Pink Dia in third. After the race Yuichi Kitamura said "I was able to race her in an ideal position... I was able to make bid with confidence. I am grateful for having been able to ride the filly since her debut, I'm really glad that I was able to deliver a good result". Four weeks later the filly contested the Grade 1 Queen Elizabeth II Cup when she was matched against older fillies and mares for the first time and started the 2.5/1 second favourite. She was settled just behind the leaders for most of the way but was unable to make any significant progress in the straight and came home fifth of the eighteen runners, two lengths behind the winner Lucky Lilac.

In January 2020, at the JRA Awards for 2019, Chrono Genesis finished third behind Gran Alegria and Loves Only You in the poll to determine the JRA Award for Best Three-Year-Old Filly, taking 47 of the 274 votes.

=== 2020: four-year-old season ===
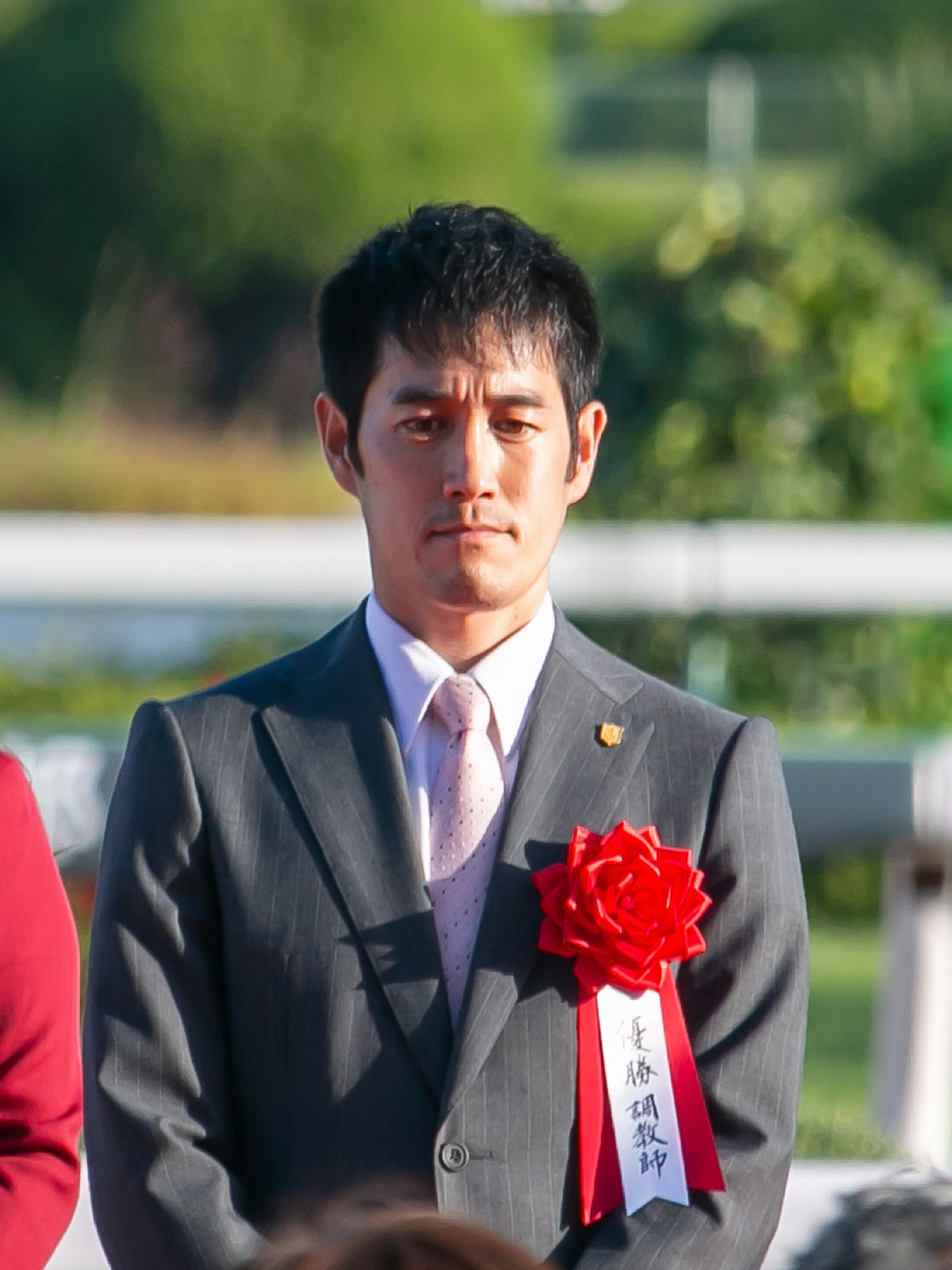
Chrono Genesis's trainer Takashi Saito

Chrono Genesis began her 2020 campaign in the Grade 2 Kyoto Kinen over 2200 metres on 16 February and started the 1.7/1 favourite ahead of Curren Bouquetd'or, Stay Foolish (Kyoto Shimbun Hai) and Dreadnoughtus (Kyoto Daishoten). After racing in third place she took the lead in the straight and drew away to win by two and a half lengths from Curren Bouquetd'or. Restrictions imposed as a result of the COVID-19 pandemic meant that her next start, the Grade 1 Osaka Hai over 2000 metres at Hanshin on 5 April was run behind closed doors. Starting the 4/1 fifth choice in a field of twelve she settled behind the leaders before heading the front-running Danon Kingly in the straight but was overtaken in the closing stages and beaten a neck into second place by Lucky Lilac.

At the same track on 28 June Chrono Genesis was one of eighteen horses to contest the 61st edition of the Grade 1 Takarazuka Kinen and started the 3.1/1 second favourite behind the four-year-old colt Saturnalia while the other contenders included Lucky Lilac, Blast Onepiece, Glory Vase, Kiseki (Kikuka Sho), Wagnerian and Persian Knight (Mile Championship). After settling in mid division, Chrono Genesis moved up on the outside to take second place behind Lucky Lilac on the final turn before gaining the advantage 300 metres from the finish and going clear of the field to win by six lengths. Kitamura commented "The filly broke smoothly and we were able to travel in good rhythm in good striking position. I didn't really have to urge her to go but she just went spontaneously. She was responding really well so I knew that she will stretch well in the lane. She has become a powerful filly and was in very good condition. She was really strong."

After a break of over four months Chrono Genesis returned to the track in November and started second favourite behind Almond Eye in the autumn running of the Tenno Sho over 2000 metres at Tokyo. She came from well off the pace with a strong late run in the straight to take third place, beaten half a length and a neck by Almond Eye and Fierement. In the poll which is used to select the field for the Arima Kinen over 2500 metres at Nakayama Racecourse Chrono Genesis topped the list with 214,472 votes, the highest total in the race's history. On 27 December she started the 1.5/1 favourite for the Arima Kinen ahead of Fierement while the other contenders included Curren Bouquetd'Or, Lucky Lilac, World Premiere, Loves Only You, Kiseki, Blast Onepiece and Persian Knight. After being restrained by Kitamura she made rapid progress on the backstretch and exited the final turn in third place behind the tiring pace-setter Babbitt and Fierement. She moved alongside Fierement in the straight and got the better of a sustained struggle with her male opponent before holding off the late run of the 73.9/1 outsider Salacia to win by a neck. After the race Kitamura said "All I wanted was her to be relaxed and her break wasn't that bad, she was in hand and ran in the same rhythm as before. Yesterday and today, I was in 2,500 meter-races here at Nakayama which enabled me to get warmed up with a good idea of how I wanted her to run," while Saito commented "She was in good form and gave us a great impression before the race. I was worried that Yuichi might have made a too early bid, but he was confident and rode her beautifully, holding off the others. This is a dream come true and I have a feeling there will be many more."

In January 2021 Chrono Genesis was given a JRA Special Award for her performances in 2020. In the 2020 World's Best Racehorse Rankings, Chrono Genesis was rated on 121, making her the equal 34th best racehorse in the world.

=== 2021: five-year-old season ===
For her first appearance of 2021 Chrono Genesis was sent to Meydan Racecourse in Dubai to face international competition in the Dubai Sheema Classic, where she lost by a neck to Mishriff.

Chrono Genesis was then entered into the 62nd Takarazuka Kinen. As her main jockey, Kitamura, had suffered a falling accident on May 2, it was announced that she would be ridden by Christophe Lemaire. In the race, the mare was placed behind frontrunners Lei Papale and Unicorn Lion before overtaking them in the final 200 meters, making her the first horse since Gold Ship in 2014 to have won the Takarazuka Kinen two years in a row, and the first mare to have won the Grand Prix races (Takarazuka and Arima) three times in a row.

Following Takarazuka, it was announced that she would be entered in to the Prix de l'Arc de Triomphe in Longchamp Racecourse, with Oisin Murphy as her new jockey. However, while she ran the race second for most of the race but finished 7th after being passed on the stretch.

After returning to Japan, Chrono Genesis ran the 2021 Arima Kinen as her final race before retirement, with Lemaire returning as jockey due to Kitamura still recovering from his injuries at the time. However, she lost to Efforia and Deep Bond, the latter who had run the l'Arc together, and finished third.

Following the race, she was officially retired and sent to Northern Farm to become a broodmare.

== Breeding career ==
Chrono Genesis' first foal, a colt by Epiphaneia named Bereshit, debuted on July 21, 2025 at a maiden race Kokura Racecourse and won the race. Bereshit shares the same jockey, trainer, and owner as his dam.

=== Breeding record ===
c = colt, f = filly

No.	Name	Year	Sex	Color	Sire	Wins	Races	Remarks
1st	Bereshit	2023	c	Dark Bay	Epiphaneia	1	4	Active
2nd	Neuerung	2024	f	Gray	Saturnalia	0	1	Active
3rd	(Chrono Genesis 2025)	2025	f	Dark Bay	Equinox			
4th	(Chrono Genesis 2026)	2026	c	Dark Bay	Kitasan Black			

== In popular culture ==
An anthropomorphized version of Chrono Genesis appears as a character in the Japanese multimedia franchise Umamusume: Pretty Derby, voiced by Hiyori Manase. She is depicted as a studious, mild-mannered girl and a member of Tracen Academy's newspaper club who loves studying the history of Umamusume racing, as well as attending and filming races. Her polite nature and knowledge of the sport's stars make her anxious to compete herself during her career mode, which takes inspiration from the real Chrono Genesis' races such as competing against Almond Eye, Gran Alegria, and Loves Only You.

== Racing form ==
Chrono Genesis won eight out of 17 starts. This data is available in JBIS, netkeiba and racingpost.

Date	Track	Race	Grade	Distance (Condition)	Entry	HN	Odds (Favored)	Finish	Time	Margins	Jockey	Winner (Runner-up)
2018 – two-year-old season
Sep 2	Kokura	2yo Newcomer		1,800 m (Good)	16	2	2.3 (1)	1st	1:50.0	–0.3	Yuichi Kitamura	(Maruka Nobel)
Oct 20	Tokyo	Ivy Stakes	OP	1,800 m (Firm)	10	1	6.5 (3)	1st	1:48.6	–0.3	Yuichi Kitamura	(Cosmo Calendula)
Dec 9	Hanshin	Hanshin Juvenile Fillies	1	1,600 m (Firm)	18	9	3.6 (2)	2nd	1:34.2	0.1	Yuichi Kitamura	Danon Fantasy
2019 – three-year-old season
Feb 11	Tokyo	Queen Cup	3	1,600 m (Firm)	9	9	2.1 (1)	1st	1:34.2	0.0	Yuichi Kitamura	(Beach Samba)
Apr 7	Hanshin	Oka Sho	1	1,600 m (Firm)	18	4	5.7 (3)	3rd	1:33.1	0.4	Yuichi Kitamura	Gran Alegria
May 19	Tokyo	Yushun Himba	1	2,400 m (Firm)	18	2	4.1 (2)	3rd	2:23.2	0.4	Yuichi Kitamura	Loves Only You
Oct 13	Kyoto	Shuka Sho	1	2,000 m (Good)	17	5	6.9 (4)	1st	1:59.9	–0.3	Yuichi Kitamura	(Curren Bouquetd'or)
Nov 10	Kyoto	QEII Cup	1	2,200 m (Firm)	18	8	3.5 (2)	5th	2:14.4	0.3	Yuichi Kitamura	Lucky Lilac
2020 – four-year-old season
Feb 16	Kyoto	Kyoto Kinen	2	2,200 m (Soft)	9	7	2.7 (1)	1st	2:16.4	–0.4	Yuichi Kitamura	(Curren Bouquetd'or)
Apr 5	Hanshin	Osaka Hai	1	2,000 m (Firm)	12	12	5.2 (4)	2nd	1:58.4	0.0	Yuichi Kitamura	Lucky Lilac
Jun 28	Hanshin	Takarazuka Kinen	1	2,200 m (Good)	18	16	4.1 (2)	1st	2:13.5	–1.0	Yuichi Kitamura	(Kiseki)
Nov 1	Tokyo	Tenno Sho (Autumn)	1	2,000 m (Firm)	12	7	4.4 (2)	3rd	1:57.9	0.1	Yuichi Kitamura	Almond Eye
Dec 27	Nakayama	Arima Kinen	1	2,500 m (Firm)	16	9	2.5 (1)	1st	2:35.0	0.0	Yuichi Kitamura	(Salacia)
2021 – five-year-old season
Mar 27	Meydan	Dubai Sheema Classic	1	2,410 m (Firm)	9	9	1.9 (1)	2nd	2:26.8	0.1	Yuichi Kitamura	Mishriff
Jun 27	Hanshin	Takarazuka Kinen	1	2,200 m (Firm)	13	7	1.8 (1)	1st	2:10.9	–0.4	Christophe Lemaire	(Unicorn Lion)
Oct 3	Longchamp	Prix de l'Arc de Triomphe	1	2,400 m (Soft)	14	7	4.8 (3)	7th	2:38.6	1.0	Oisin Murphy	Torquator Tasso
Dec 26	Nakayama	Arima Kinen	1	2,500 m (Firm)	16	7	2.9 (2)	3rd	2:32.2	0.2	Christophe Lemaire	Efforia

Legend:
Turf

== Pedigree ==
Pedigree of Chrono Genesis (JPN), grey filly 2016
Sire Bago (FR) 2001	Nashwan (USA); 1986	Blushing Groom (FR)	Red God (USA)
Sire Bago (FR) 2001	Nashwan (USA); 1986	Blushing Groom (FR)	Runaway Bride (GB)
Sire Bago (FR) 2001	Nashwan (USA); 1986	Height of Fashion (FR)	Bustino (GB)
Sire Bago (FR) 2001	Nashwan (USA); 1986	Height of Fashion (FR)	Highclere (GB)
Sire Bago (FR) 2001	Moonlight's Box (USA); 1996	Nureyev	Northern Dancer (CAN)
Sire Bago (FR) 2001	Moonlight's Box (USA); 1996	Nureyev	Special
Sire Bago (FR) 2001	Moonlight's Box (USA); 1996	Coup de Genie	Mr. Prospector
Sire Bago (FR) 2001	Moonlight's Box (USA); 1996	Coup de Genie	Coup de Folie
Dam Chronologist (JPN) 2003	Kurofune (USA); 1998	French Deputy	Deputy Minister (CAN)
Dam Chronologist (JPN) 2003	Kurofune (USA); 1998	French Deputy	Mitterand
Dam Chronologist (JPN) 2003	Kurofune (USA); 1998	Blue Avenue	Classic Go Go
Dam Chronologist (JPN) 2003	Kurofune (USA); 1998	Blue Avenue	Eliza Blue
Dam Chronologist (JPN) 2003	In This Unison (JPN); 1997	Sunday Silence (USA)	Halo
Dam Chronologist (JPN) 2003	In This Unison (JPN); 1997	Sunday Silence (USA)	Wishing Well
Dam Chronologist (JPN) 2003	In This Unison (JPN); 1997	Rustic Belle (USA)	Mr. Prospector
Dam Chronologist (JPN) 2003	In This Unison (JPN); 1997	Rustic Belle (USA)	Ragtime Girl (Family: 20-a)

- Chrono Genesis is inbred 4 × 4 to Mr. Prospector, meaning that this stallion appears twice in the fourth generation of her pedigree.

== See also ==
- Croix du Nord - Another horse owned by Sunday Racing, trained by Takashi Saito, and ridden by Yuichi Kitamura
