= Glory Vase =

Japanese-bred Thoroughbred racehorse

Glory Vase グローリーヴェイズ
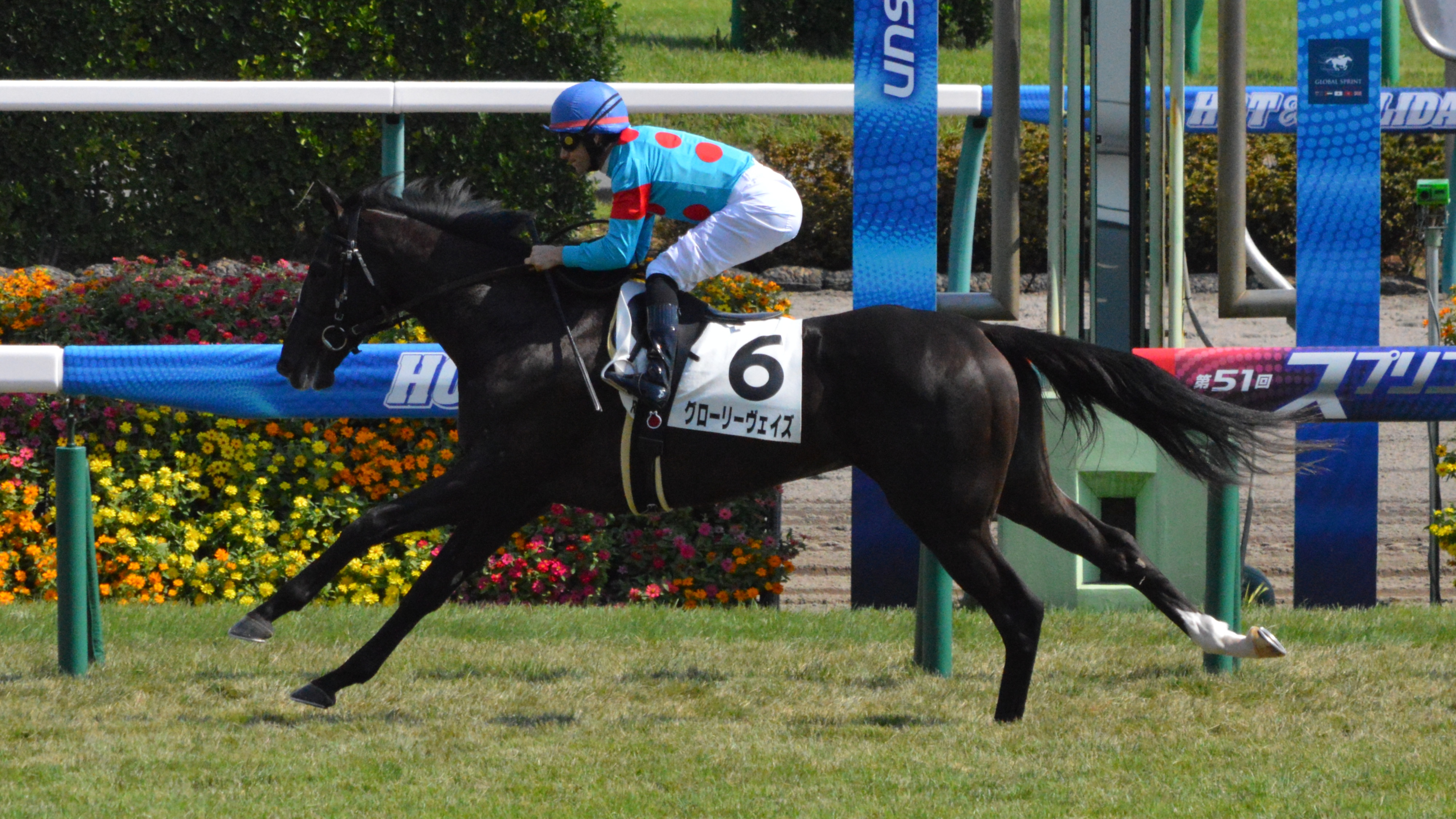
- Glory Vase on his racecourse debut
- Breed: Thoroughbred
- Sire: Deep Impact
- Grandsire: Sunday Silence
- Dam: Mejiro Tsubone
- Damsire: Swept Overboard
- Sex: Stallion
- Foaled: 2 March 2015
- Country: Japan
- Colour: Dark Bay
- Breeder: Lake Villa Farm
- Owner: Silk Racing
- Racing colours
- Trainer: Tomohito Ozeki
- Jockey: Joao Moreira
- Record: 20: 6-4-2
- Earnings: ¥308,978,000 + HK$30,500,000 + US$60,000

Major wins
- Nikkei Shinshun Hai (2019); Hong Kong Vase (2019, 2021); Kyoto Daishoten (2020)

Glory Vase (Japanese: グローリーヴェイズ, Hepburn: Gurōrī Veizu; foaled 2 March 2015) is a Japanese Thoroughbred racehorse. He showed promising form in his first two seasons of racing, winning two minor races and finishing fifth in the Kikuka Sho. As a four-year-old in 2019 he emerged as a world-class performer, winning the Nikkei Shinshun Hai and running second in the spring edition of the Tenno Sho before recording his biggest victory in the Hong Kong Vase. He won the Kyoto Daishoten in 2020.

== Background ==
Glory Vase is a dark bay horse with a white blaze and a white sock on his right hind leg bred in Japan by Lake Villa Farm. In 2016 the yearling was entered in the Select Sale and was bought for ¥56,160,000 by the Silk Horse Club. The horse entered the ownership of Silk Racing and was sent into training with Tomohito Ozeki.

He was from the eighth crop of foals sired by Deep Impact, who was the Japanese Horse of the Year in 2005 and 2006, winning races including the Tokyo Yushun, Tenno Sho, Arima Kinen and Japan Cup. Deep Impact's other progeny include Gentildonna, Harp Star, Kizuna, A Shin Hikari, Marialite and Saxon Warrior.

Glory Vase was the first foal of his dam Mejiro Tsubone who showed some racing ability, winning four races from 26 starts between 2010 and 2014. She was a granddaughter of the Yushun Himba winner Mejiro Ramonu, who, as a descendant of the broodmare Betsy Ross (foaled 1939), was related to Makybe Diva and Canford Cliffs.

== Racing career ==
=== 2017: two-year-old season ===
On 1 October 2017 at Nakayama Racecourse Glory Vase made a successful track debut when he defeated thirteen opponents in an event for previously unraced juveniles over 1800 metres. On his only other appearance that year he was narrowly beaten by Kafuji Vanguard in the Koyamaki Sho over 1600 metres at Chukyo Racecourse.

=== 2018: three-year-old season ===
Glory Vase began his second season by starting the 2.4/1 second favourite for the Grade 3 Kisaragi Sho over 1800 metres at Kyoto Racecourse on 4 February. He moved up to join the front-running Satono Favor approaching the final turn but although he kept on well in the straight he was unable to get past the leader and was beaten a nose into second place. After a three-month break the colt returned to the same track in May for the Grade 2 Kyoto Shimbun Hai over 2200 metres and finished fourth of the seventeen runners, two and a half lengths behind the winner Stay Foolish. Another lengthy break followed before the colt contested the Sado Stakes over 2000 metres at Niigata Racecourse on 28 July. Ridden by Mirco Demuro, he started odds-on favourite and won by one and a quarter lengths from Bear In Mind. On his final appearance of the year, the colt was stepped up in class and distance for the Grade 1 Kikuka Sho over 3000 metres at Kyoto on 21 October and started a 74/1 outsider in an eighteen-runner field. Ridden by Yuichi Fukunaga he raced towards the rear before producing an "impressive late drive" on the outside to come home fifth behind Fierement, Etario, You Can Smile and Blast Onepiece.

=== 2019: four-year-old season ===
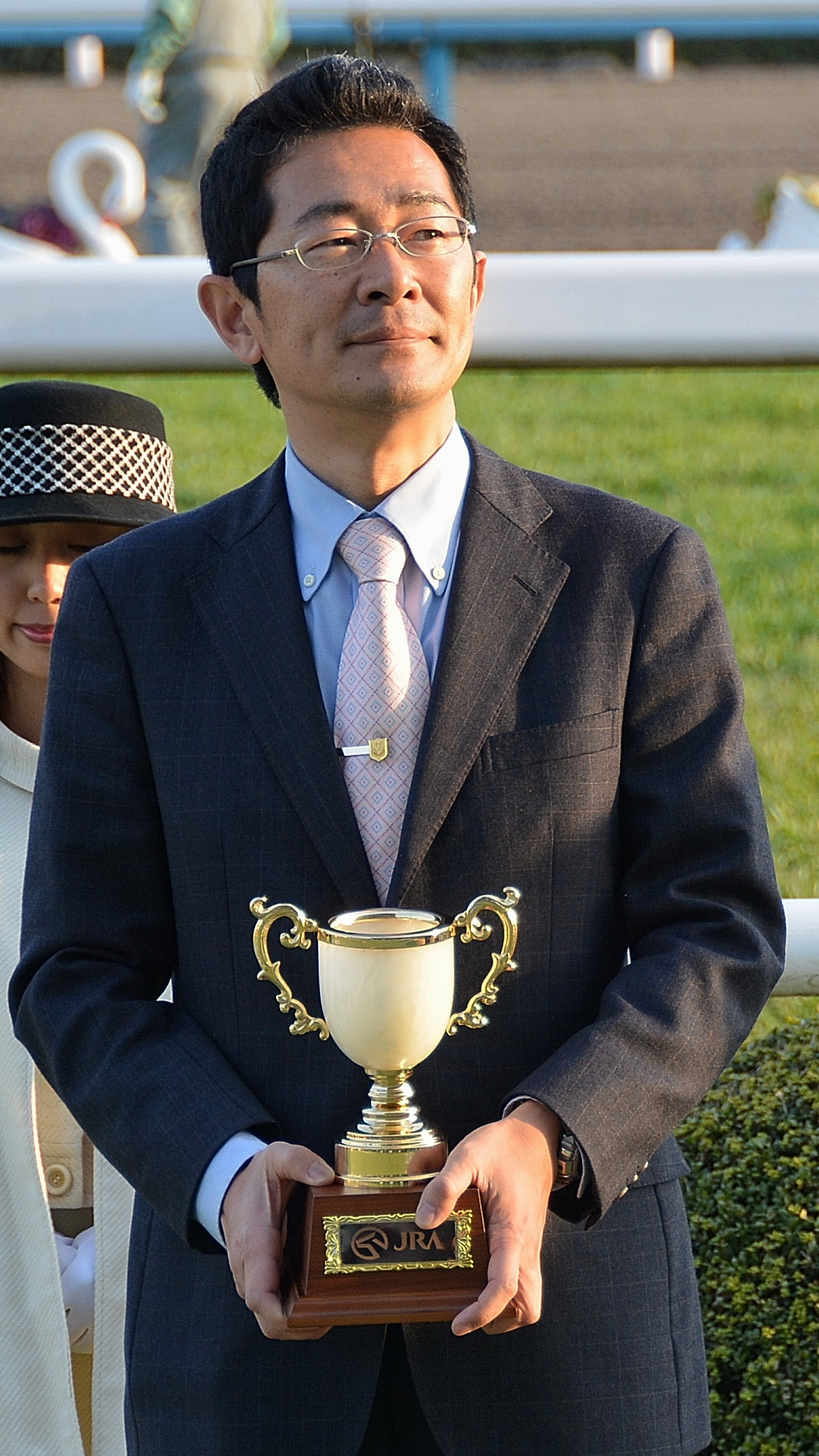
Glory Vase's trainer Tomohito Ozeki

On his first appearance of 2019 Glory Vase, with Demuro in the saddle, started the 1.7/1 favourite for the Grade 2 Nikkei Shinshun Hai over 2400 metres at Kyoto on 13 January. After racing in mid-division he moved into contention approaching the final turn, took the lead inside the last 200 metres and kept on to win by half a length from the six-year-old Look Twice. For his next start, the colt was stepped back up to the highest class for the spring edition of the Tenno Sho over 3200 metres at Kyoto on 28 April and went off the 10.3/1 sixth choice in a thirteen-runner field. He tracked the favourite Fierement for most of the way before moving up to challenge that horse for the lead in the straight. The two engaged in what was described as a "fierce duel" in the closing stages before Fierement defeated Glory Vase by a neck, the pair finishing six lengths clear of the other 11 runners.

Glory Vase was off the track for more than five months before returning in the Grade 2 Kyoto Daishoten on 6 October when he started favourite but finished sixth of the seventeen runners behind the 90/1 outsider Dreadnoughtus. For his final run of the season the colt was sent to Hong Kong to contest the Hong Kong Vase over 2400 metres at Sha Tin Racecourse on 8 December. Ridden by the locally based João Moreira he started the 7.2/1 third favourite behind the 2018 winner Exultant and the 2019 Epsom Derby winner Anthony Van Dyck while the other eleven runners included Lucky Lilac, Deirdre, Aspetar (Preis von Europa) and Prince of Arran (runner-up in the Melbourne Cup). Glory Vase was restrained in the early stages before beginning to make progress 600 metres from the finish. He overtook the front-running Exultant 200 metres out and accelerated away from his opponents to win in "impressive" style by three and a half lengths. After the race Tomohito Ozeki said "I’m overwhelmed. The plan was to come here, we’ve been targeting this race because we felt the track would suit him and the owner was happy to come. Winning international races like this, this is my job as a trainer, this is the best. Moreira did an amazing job riding the horse. We had a meeting together yesterday and felt good about our chances."

In the 2019 World's Best Racehorse Rankings Glory Vase was given a rating of 125, making him the 9th best racehorse in the world.

=== 2020: five-year-old season ===
Glory Vase was sent to Dubai to start the 2020 campaign at the Dubai Turf, but as the race itself was cancelled due to the COVID-19 pandemic, the horse was returned to Japan. Glory Vase would ultimately begin his 2020 campaign at the 61st edition of the Grade 1 Takarazuka Kinenat Hanshin Racecourse on 28 June, where the horse was the 9.7/1 fifth choice in the betting. However, he ran poorly and came home seventeenth of the eighteen runners behind Chrono Genesis, beaten more than thirty lengths by the winner. As in the previous season Glory Vase returned from the summer break in the Kyoto Daishoten on 11 October when he was ridden by Yuga Kawada and was the 5.2/1 third favourite behind Kiseki (2017 Kikuka Sho) and King of Koji (Meguro Kinen) in a seventeen-runner field. He settled in fifth place before moving up on the outside on the final turn, taking the lead in the last 200 metres and keeping on well to win by three quarters of a length from Kiseki.

On 29 November Glory Vase was again partnered by Kawada when he went off the 16.2/1 fourth choice in the betting for the Japan Cup over 2400 metres at Tokyo Racecourse. He raced in second place for most of the way behind the runaway leader Kiseki but after making a strong challenge in the straight he was outpaced in the closing stages and came home fifth behind Almond Eye, Contrail, Daring Tact and Curren Bouquetd'or, beaten two lengths by the winner.

In the 2020 World's Best Racehorse Rankings, Glory Vase was rated on 123, making him the equal fifteenth best racehorse in the world.

=== 2021: six-year-old season ===
Glory Vase started the season with the Kinko Sho where he was the second choice behind Daring Tact, but finished fourth to Gibeon. The horse was then sent to Hong Kong to enter the Queen Elizabeth II Cup, where the horse placed himself in the rear until the final stretch, and while the horse could not catch up to the winner, Loves Only You, he was still able to finish in second place. After this race, Glory Vase took the summer off before running in the All Comer, where he finished in third place as he was unable to catch up to Win Marilyn.

On December 12, Glory Vase returned to Hong Kong to run in the Hong Kong Vase once again, with Moreira at the helm. The horse placed itself in the rear and passed the pack on the final stretch, beating out Pyledriver and winning the race for a second time in his career.

=== 2022: seven-year-old season ===
Glory Vase went to Dubai once again to start his season, this time at the Dubai Sheema Classic. The horse was unable to catch up and finished at eighth place behind Shahryar, who had a two-and-a-quarter length between them. He then took a five months long break before entering the Sapporo Kinen, but finished sixth. Glory Vase would go on to run the Hong Kong Vase for a third and final time, but finished third behind Win Marilyn.

Glory Vase's race horse registration was withdrawn on December 20, and will stand stud at the Breeders Stallion Station in Hidaka, Hokkaido.

== Racing form ==
Glory Vase won six races and placed in another six out of 20 starts. This data is based on JBIS, netkeiba, HKJC, and Emirates Racing Authority (ERA).

Date	Track	Race	Grade	Distance (Condition)	Entry	HN	Odds (Favored)	Finish	Time	Margins	Jockey	Winner (Runner-up)
2017 – two-year-old season
Oct 1	Nakayama	2yo Newcomer		1,800 m (Firm)	14	6	1.7 (1)	1st	1:52.8	–0.3	Mirco Demuro	(Mikki Hide)
Dec 10	Chukyo	Koyamaki Sho	ALW (1W)	1,600 m (Firm)	7	3	2.4 (2)	2nd	1:37.8	0.0	Suguru Hamanaka	Kafuji Vanguard
2018 – three-year-old season
Feb 4	Kyoto	Kisaragi Sho	3	1,800 m (Firm)	10	8	3.4 (2)	2nd	1:48.8	0.0	Mirco Demuro	Satono Favor
May 5	Kyoto	Kyoto Shimbun Hai	2	2,200 m (Firm)	17	2	6.5 (2)	4th	2:11.4	0.4	Suguru Hamanaka	Stay Foolish
Jul 28	Niigata	Sado Stakes	ALW (3W)	2,000 m (Firm)	10	4	1.9 (1)	1st	1:56.6	–0.2	Mirco Demuro	(Bear in Mind)
Oct 21	Kyoto	Kikuka Sho	1	3,000 m (Firm)	18	18	75.4 (12)	5th	3:06.6	0.5	Yuichi Fukunaga	Fierement
2019 – four-year-old season
Jan 13	Kyoto	Nikkei Shinshun Hai	2	2,400 m (Firm)	16	2	2.7 (1)	1st	2:26.2	–0.1	Mirco Demuro	(Look Twice)
Apr 28	Kyoto	Tenno Sho (Spring)	1	3,200 m (Firm)	13	7	11.3 (6)	2nd	3:15.0	0.0	Keita Tosaki	Fierement
Oct 6	Kyoto	Kyoto Daishoten	2	2,400 m (Firm)	17	16	2.0 (1)	6th	2:24.3	0.8	Mirco Demuro	Dreadnoughtus
Dec 8	Sha Tin	Hong Kong Vase	1	2,400 m (Firm)	14	2	5.5 (3)	1st	2:24.8	–0.5	Joao Moreira	(Lucky Lilac)
2020 – five-year-old season
Jun 28	Hanshin	Takarazuka Kinen	1	2,200 m (Good)	18	3	10.7 (5)	17th	2:18.8	5.3	Damian Lane	Chrono Genesis
Oct 11	Kyoto	Kyoto Daishoten	2	2,400 m (Good)	17	13	6.2 (3)	1st	2:25.6	–0.1	Yuga Kawada	(Kiseki)
Nov 29	Tokyo	Japan Cup	1	2,400 m (Firm)	15	15	17.2 (4)	5th	2:23.3	0.3	Yuga Kawada	Almond Eye
2021 – six-year-old season
Mar 14	Chukyo	Kinko Sho	2	2,000 m (Soft)	10	4	4.5 (2)	4th	2:01.9	0.1	Yuga Kawada	Gibeon
Apr 25	Sha Tin	QE II Cup	1	2,000 m (Firm)	7	1	4.1 (2)	2nd	2:01.4	0.2	Karis Teetan	Loves Only You
Sep 26	Nakayama	Sankei Sho All Comers	2	2,200 m (Firm)	16	11	6.2 (3)	3rd	2:12.2	0.3	Mirco Demuro	Win Marilyn
Dec 12	Sha Tin	Hong Kong Vase	1	2,400 m (Firm)	8	2	1.6 (1)	1st	2:27.1	–0.1	Joao Moreira	(Pyledriver)
2022 – seven-year-old season
Mar 26	Meydan	Dubai Sheema Classic	1	2,410 m (Firm)	15	4	7.7 (5)	8th	2:27.4	0.5	Christophe Soumillon	Shahryar
Aug 21	Sapporo	Sapporo Kinen	2	2,000 m (Firm)	16	6	7.0 (4)	6th	2:01.8	0.6	Christophe Lemaire	Jack d'Or
Dec 11	Sha Tin	Hong Kong Vase	1	2,400 m (Firm)	9	3	2.6 (1)	3rd	2:27.8	0.3	Joao Moreira	Win Marilyn

Legend:
Turf

== Pedigree ==
Pedigree of Glory Vase (JPN), dark bay horse 2015
Sire Deep Impact (JPN) 2002	Sunday Silence (USA); 1986	Halo	Hail to Reason
Sire Deep Impact (JPN) 2002	Sunday Silence (USA); 1986	Halo	Cosmah
Sire Deep Impact (JPN) 2002	Sunday Silence (USA); 1986	Wishing Well	Understanding
Sire Deep Impact (JPN) 2002	Sunday Silence (USA); 1986	Wishing Well	Mountain Flower
Sire Deep Impact (JPN) 2002	Wind in Her Hair (IRE); 1991	Alzao (USA)	Lyphard
Sire Deep Impact (JPN) 2002	Wind in Her Hair (IRE); 1991	Alzao (USA)	Lady Rebecca (GB)
Sire Deep Impact (JPN) 2002	Wind in Her Hair (IRE); 1991	Burghclere (GB)	Busted
Sire Deep Impact (JPN) 2002	Wind in Her Hair (IRE); 1991	Burghclere (GB)	Highclere
Dam Mejiro Tsubone (JPN) 2008	Swept Overboard (USA); 1997	End Sweep	Forty Niner
Dam Mejiro Tsubone (JPN) 2008	Swept Overboard (USA); 1997	End Sweep	Broom Dance
Dam Mejiro Tsubone (JPN) 2008	Swept Overboard (USA); 1997	Sheer Ice	Cutlass
Dam Mejiro Tsubone (JPN) 2008	Swept Overboard (USA); 1997	Sheer Ice	Hey Dolly A
Dam Mejiro Tsubone (JPN) 2008	Mejiro Rubato (JPN); 2003	Mejiro Ryan	Amber Shadai
Dam Mejiro Tsubone (JPN) 2008	Mejiro Rubato (JPN); 2003	Mejiro Ryan	Mejiro Chaser
Dam Mejiro Tsubone (JPN) 2008	Mejiro Rubato (JPN); 2003	Mejiro Ramonu	Mogami (FR)
Dam Mejiro Tsubone (JPN) 2008	Mejiro Rubato (JPN); 2003	Mejiro Ramonu	Mejiro Hiryu (Family: 9-f)
