= Kiseki (horse) =

Japanese Thoroughbred racehorse

Kiseki キセキ
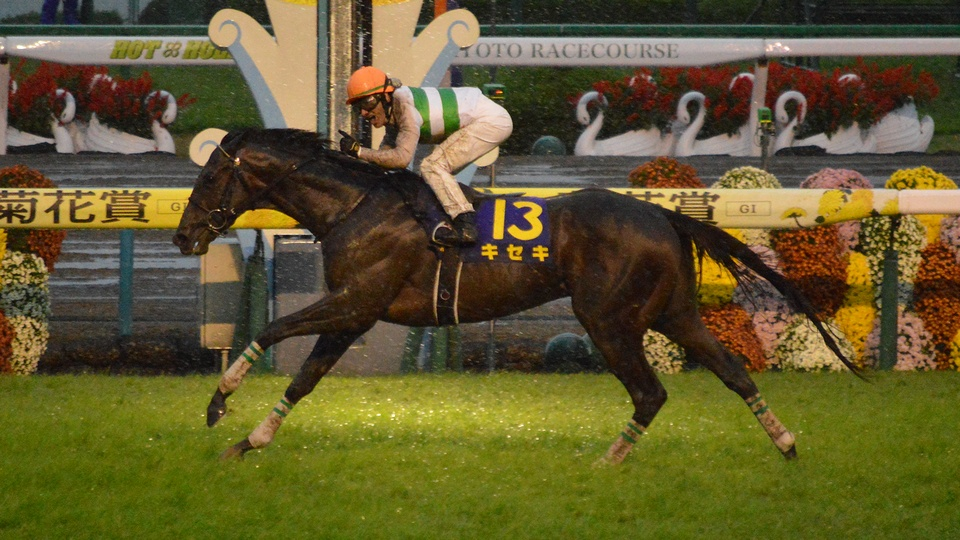
- Kiseki during the 2017 Kikuka Sho
- Breed: Thoroughbred
- Sire: Rulership
- Grandsire: King Kamehameha
- Dam: Blitz Finale
- Damsire: Deep Impact
- Sex: Stallion
- Foaled: May 13, 2014
- Country: Japan
- Colour: Dark bay
- Breeder: Shimokobe Ranch Co., Ltd.
- Owner: Tatsue Ishikawa
- Racing colours
- Trainer: Katsuhiko Sumii ->Kazuya Nakatake ->Katsuhiko Sumii ->Yasuyuki Tsujino
- Jockey: Mirco Demuro; Yuga Kawada
- Record: 33: 4-6-6
- Earnings: Japan: 701,403,000 JPY; France: 13,650 EUR; Hong Kong: HK$ 1,425,000

Major wins
- Japanese Classic Race wins: Kikuka Sho (2017)
- Last updated on Jan 20, 2026

Kiseki (Japanese: キセキ, Hepburn: Kiseki; foaled May 13, 2014) is a retired Japanese Thoroughbred racehorse best known for winning the 2017 Kikuka Sho.

== Background ==
Kiseki was sired by Rulership who won the 2012 Queen Elizabeth II Cup, a G1 race in Hong Kong, along with many other G2 wins in Japan. Rulership's sire and Kiseki's grandsire, King Kamehameha, won the 2004 NHK Mile Cup and Japanese Derby, and sired successful racehorses such as Duramente, Lord Kanaloa, Lovely Day, Hokko Tarumae and Rey de Oro. Rulership's dam and therefore Kiseki's granddam, Air Groove, won the 1997 Tenno Sho (Autumn) and placed second in the 1997 and 1998 Japan Cup.

Kiseki's dam, Blitz Finale, never raced but was sired by Deep Impact, the leading sire in Japan for ten years from 2012 to 2022. Deep Impact was sired by successful American racehorse and Japanese sire Sunday Silence. Sunday Silence won two of the three races of the American Triple Crown and was the American Horse of the Year in 1989, and the leading sire in Japan from 1995 to 2007.

== Racing career ==
=== 2016: two-year-old season ===
On December 11, Kiseki ran in a debut race at Hanshin Racecourse as the second favourite. Running in third place on the outside during the race, he pulled ahead in the final stretch and won by three and a half lengths. This would be Kiseki's only race as a two-year-old.

=== 2017: three-year-old season ===
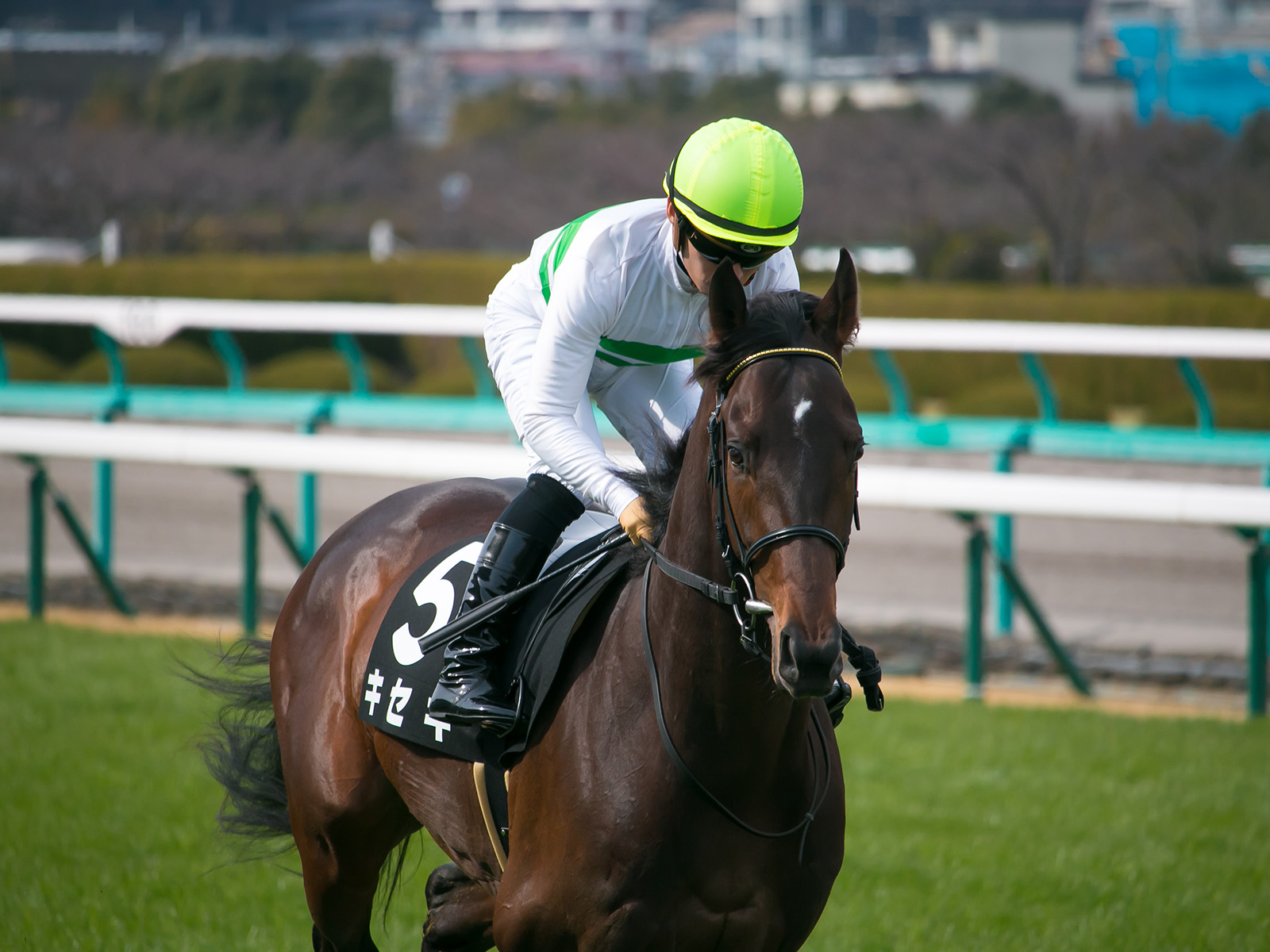
Kiseki after the Sumire Stakes

In Kiseki's first race as a three-year-old, the Saintpaulia Sho (an allowance race for horses who had won one race and earned less than 5 million yen during their careers) on January 29, he was the first favourite, but failed to keep up during the final stretch and placed fifth. In the subsequent Sumire Stakes, he was again the first favourite, but couldn't catch the leaders Clincher and Tagano Ashura and placed third. In the Mainichi Hai, he closed in on the leading group during the final stretch, but narrowly fell short, again finishing third.

On July 15, Kiseki returned in a race for 3-year-olds and older with a 5 million yen prize at Chukyo Racecourse, coming from behind to quickly overtake the front runners and winning her second race by 2 lengths; this race was also jockey Yuichi Fukunaga's 2,000th JRA win. In the following Shinanogawa Tokubetsu he conserved his energy at the back, easily surged ahead in the stretch, and won his third race in a row.

For his next race, Kiseki was entered in the Grade 2 Kobe Shimbun Hai on September 24. Because of his improved performance in his last three races, he was backed as the second favourite behind Rey de Oro, who had won the year's Japanese Derby. During the race, he stayed in the mid-pack, then immediately moved forward through a gap in the pack in the straight. With about 200 meters remaining, he closed in on Rey de Oro with the fastest final 3-furlong time of the field, 33.9 seconds, but the gap had already widened, and he fell short by two lengths, finishing second. Despite the loss, he earned automatic entry into the Kikuka-shō.

==== Kikuka Sho victory and Hong Kong Vase ====
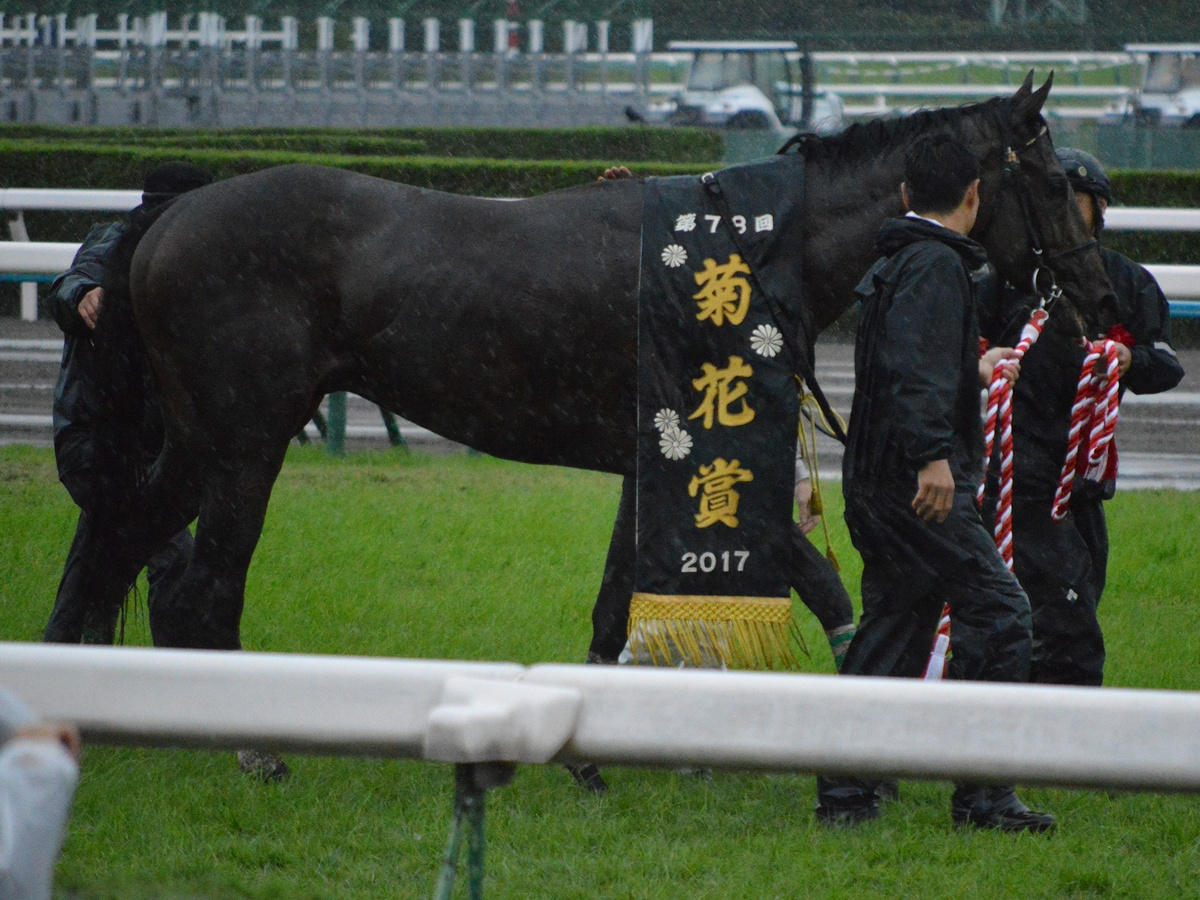
Kiseki during the Kikuka Sho winner's ceremony

In the Kikuka Sho held on October 22, neither of the top three finishers in that year's Derby made an appearance, including Rey de Oro, who aimed primarily for the Japan Cup that year, Suave Richard, who was unable to recover in time from a rest period, and Admirable, who had been diagnosed with a leg issue on August 2 and spent the rest of the year resting. Additionally, due to the impact of Typhoon Lan, the race was held in unusually heavy conditions. As a result, although the race favourite received support, the odds for a single win were 4.5 to 1, reflecting a highly competitive field. It had been 22 years since the odds for the favourite to win the race exceeded 4 to 1, last occurring when Mayano Top Gun won in 1995 (the favourite at that time was Dance Partner, with odds of 4.9 to 1).

In the race, Kiseki ran slightly behind the middle of the pack, gradually moved forward near the slope between the third and fourth turns, and unleashed its stored energy on the home stretch. With the last 3 furlongs run in 39.6 seconds, Kiseki overtook the front-running Clincher around 100 meters from the finish and held off challengers like Mikki Swallow and Popocatepetl, winning by a two-length margin.

Kiseki's Kikuka Sho victory marked the first graded race victory for a progeny of Rulership, and for jockey Mirco Demuro, who had previously won the Satsuki Sho and Derby in 2003 with Neo Universe and in 2015 with Duramente, this victory completed a sweep of the Japanese Triple Crown for colts. Additionally, the 10th favourite Clincher finished second, and the 13th favourite Popocatepetl finished third, making the trifecta payout for this race 559,700 yen, breaking the previous record of 523,990 yen in 2008 and setting the highest payout in Kikuka Sho history.

On December 10, Kiseki entered the G1 Hong Kong Vase at Sha Tin Racecourse, but on December 12, it was announced that a skin disease was found on his left forelimb, and he was moved to an environment isolated from other horses in the quarantine stable. The skin disease itself was mild and training was carried out as usual. In the race, he was late at the start and chased the rear, and started advancing in front of the other side, but he did not stretch in a straight line and finished in 9th place.

=== 2018: four-year-old season ===
In the first race of the new year, Kiseki ran in the Grade 2 Nikkei Sho as the favorite. The first 1000 meters were run at a slow pace of 1 minute 2.8 seconds, and so he moved up to the front from mid-pack at the second corner, but was unable to sustain his speed in the final stretch and finished 9th.

After that, instead of running in the Tenno Sho (Spring), Kiseki entered the Takarazuka Kinen. He was supported as the second favourite behind Satono Diamond, who was the first in fan voting. In the race, he chased from the rear along with the Hong Kong-based racehorse Werther and ran third-fastest in the final stretch, but was unable to find an opening and finished 8th. After the Takarazuka Kinen, following the suspension of trainer Katsuhiko Sumii, Kiseki was transferred to the stable of Kazuya Nakatake.

On October 7, in the Grade 2 Mainichi Ōkan, with Masayoshi Kawada as his new jockey, he ran carrying the only assigned weight of 58kg among the runners, which lowered her odds to 6th favourite. Kiseki chased Aerolithe from second place after she led and held on in the straight, but was later overtaken by Stelvio and finished in 3rd place.

In his next race, Kiseki ran in the Tennō Shō (Autumn) on October 28. Competing again against accomplished horses such as Rey de Oro and Suave Richard, he remained the 6th favourite with odds of 12 to 8. Although he was assigned the 10th post out of 12, he accelerated from the start and took the lead at the second corner, further increasing his pace in the latter half to maintain a two-length advantage over the others as he entered the final stretch. Although he was overtaken by Rey de Oro and Sungrazer just before the finish line, he secured a position of third place.

==== Japan Cup and Arima Kinen ====
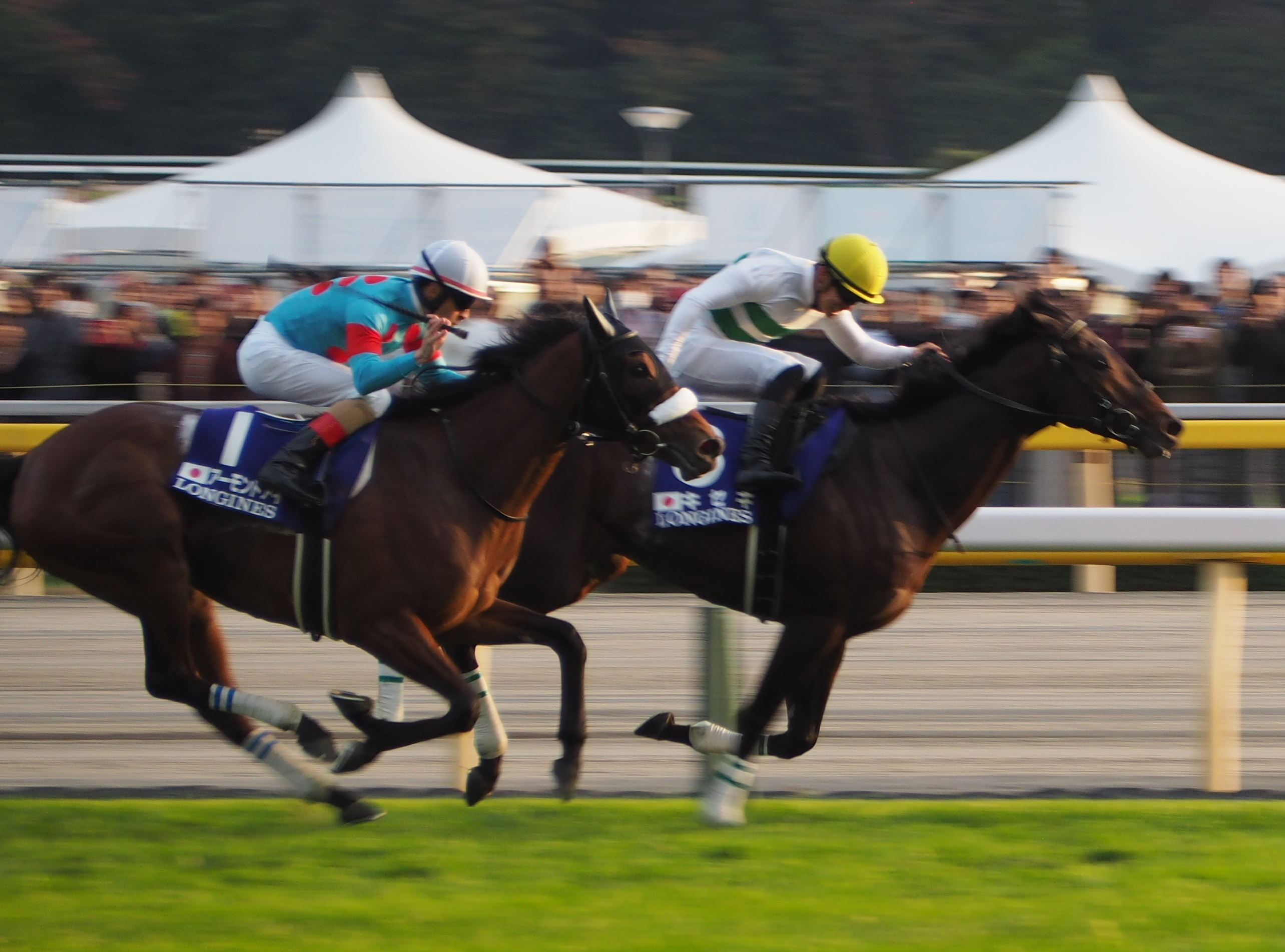
Almond Eye (left) and Kiseki (right) during the final stretch of the Japan Cup

After the autumn Tenno Sho, Kiseki ran in the G1 Japan Cup on November 25. While the Triple Crown-winning filly Almond Eye received overwhelming support at odds of 1.4, Kiseki was backed as the fourth favourite behind Suave Richard and Satono Diamond. From a good start, he took the lead and set an average pace of 59.9 seconds for the first 1000 meters, then gradually increased the pace, passing 2000 meters in 1 minute 57.2 seconds — the same time as the old course record set by Vodka in 2008. In the final stretch, he held his lead, and tried to pull away from the pursuing horses, but Almond Eye, who had been racing in second place, overtook 150 meters from the finish, and Kiseki came second by 1 and 3/4 lengths. Almond Eye's winning time of 2 minutes 20.6 seconds greatly improved the previous Japanese record of 2 minutes 22.1 seconds and also surpassed the 2 minutes 21.98-second world record for the distance set by Asidero. Almond Eye's speed record for the Japan Cup would not be beaten until Calandagan's victory in 2025.

Kiseki's finishing time also broke the previous record by more than a second, finishing 3 1/2 lengths ahead of third-place Suave Richard. Jockey Yuga Kawada commented, "Under normal circumstances, it’s a race we could easily hold onto the lead. Today, there was a wonderful horse in front of me," and Almond Eye's jockey Christophe Lemaire also said, "Kiseki is a strong horse and doesn’t stop."

For Kiseki's final race of the year, he ran in the Grade 1 Arima Kinen on December 23, gathering the sixth-most votes from fans. With Suave Richard skipping the race, Kiseki became the only horse to participate in all of the autumn three-year-old Classics that year and was supported as the second favourite behind Rey de Oro. In the race, from the 14th outer post, he passed Oju Chosan, who had taken the lead from a good start, and Mickey Rocket, who was vying for the lead, setting off to run in front. Despite the slightly heavy track, he passed the first 1000 meters in 60.8 seconds. Maintaining a 3-length lead, he entered the final straight but was caught by the pursuing horses before the finish line and finished fifth.

=== 2019: five-year-old season ===
With the expiration of trainer Katsuhiko Sumii's suspension, the horse was transferred back from Kazuya Nakadake's stable to Katsuhiko Sumii's stable on January 7. That year, he began racing with the G1 Ōsaka Hai on March 31. Competing in a star-studded field that included eight G1 winners such as Wagnerian and Persian Knight, as well as other strong horses like Sungrazer and Air Windsor, the horse was backed as the second favourite behind Blast Onepiece, who had won the previous year's Arima Kinen. In the race, Kiseki tracked second behind Epoca d'Oro, who set a slow pace, and in the straight, he extended his run through the centre of the track, but was narrowly beaten by a head by Al Ain, who came from the inside, finishing in second place.

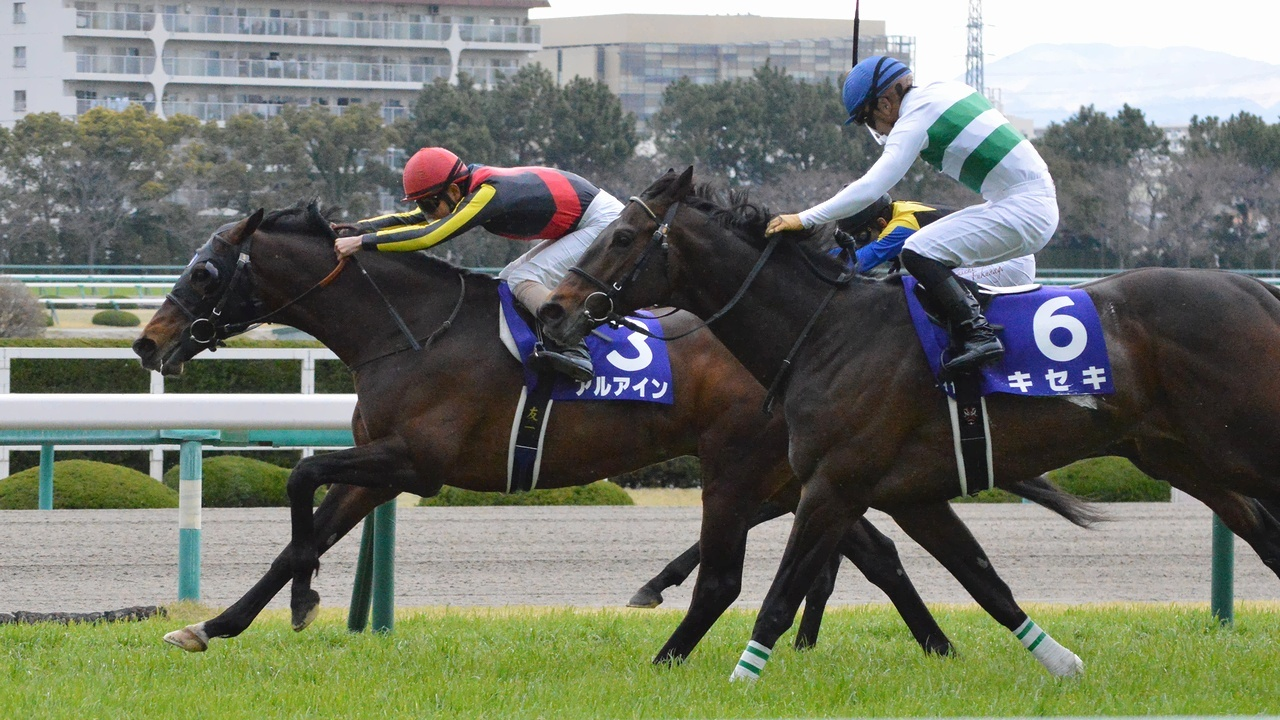
Al Ain (left) and Kiseki (right) on the homestretch of 2019 Osaka Hai

After the Osaka Hai, Kiseki ran in the G1 Takarazuka Kinen. Among the 12 horses, including six G1 winners, Kiseki was the favorite, narrowly behind Rey de Oro. In the race, he struggled with positioning immediately after the start but took advantage of the innermost post to seize the lead. However, Lys Gracieux unexpectedly took an aggressive early position, pursuing from the second place, and on the final straight, Kiseki was overtaken by the horse. Although Kiseki held off Suave Richard and others who were chasing, he finished three lengths behind the winner Lys Gracieux, placing second for the second consecutive time following the Osaka Hai. After the race, jockey Yuga Kawada said, "It was able to hold off the rest, but the winner was strong. It ran its own race properly, but I’m sorry it couldn’t meet expectations."

==== Races in France and Arima Kinen ====
After the Takarazuka Kinen, Kiseki left Japan to participate in the Prix de l'Arc de Triomphe and arrived on August 22 at the Gavarnie Hellon training stable in France for adjustments.

Kiseki then ran in the Prix Foy, a prep race for the Prix de l'Arc de Triomphe. The jockey was Christophe Soumillon, who had won the Arc twice before. In this race, which had a small field of just four horses, Kiseki attempted to take the lead and go on the front, but lacked stamina in the final stretch and finished third. The winner was the local horse Waldgeist, who achieved consecutive victories. After the race, jockey Soumillon cited the slow pace as the reason for the loss and commented on the Arc, saying, "He will face strong competitors in the Arc, but he has experienced the course and I think he will improve further with this step-up."

For the Prix de l'Arc de Triomphe, he ran again with Soumillon. Other horses from Japan included Blast Onepiece and Fierement, who came via the Sapporo Kinen. In the race, he had a slow start, could not take the lead as usual, and ran from mid-pack. He was unable to close the gap to the leaders and finished seventh. The winner was Waldgeist, who had defeated him in the Prix Foy, stopping Enable, the strongest British mare with 12 consecutive wins, from extending her winning streak.

After returning to Japan, Kiseki ran again in the Arima Kinen as his final race of the year. In the fan voting, he received the third-highest number of votes after Almond Eye and Lys Gracieux, and Ryan Moore was chosen as his jockey. In the race itself, he had a slow start and was unable to take the lead, but as Aerolithe set off at a breakneck pace, the pace of the race changed, and he made a late charge down the straight to finish fifth.

=== 2020: six-year-old season ===
After the Arima Kinen, Ryan Moore advised the team that "longer distances are better," and so Kiseki started his six-year-old season with the Hanshin Daishōten, a long-distance 3000m race. Although he was overwhelmingly favoured with odds of 1.6 to 1, he made a very slow start and subsequently could not settle, finishing in 7th place. After the race, jockey Kawada reflected that "he had no intention to exit the gate and ran wildly the moment he did," and trainer Katsuhiko Kakui commented on the performance, saying "Everything was no good." Because of the very poor start, Kiseki was required to undergo a re-examination of his starting gate training.

Following the defeat in the Hanshin Daishoten, it was initially decided to skip the planned Tennō Shō (Spring); however, it was then announced that he would indeed run in the Tenno Sho as originally planned. On April 15, he passed the starting gate re-examination with Yutaka Take, who was scheduled to ride him in the Tenno Sho, and his participation in the Tenno Sho (Spring) was formally confirmed.

In the Tenno Sho (Spring), Fierement, the winner of the 2019 iteration of the race, and You Can Smile, who had won the Hanshin Daishoten where Kiseki was defeated, had pushed Kiseki into the third favourite position. In the main race, Kiseki managed to get off smoothly despite concerns at the start and settled in third place during the race. During the first lap on the home stretch, he pulled ahead and took the lead, and although he tried to maintain the lead, he ran out of strength midway down the final straight and finished sixth.

Kiseki was next scheduled for the Takarazuka Kinen for the third consecutive year after placing 7th in the fan voting, again with Yutaka Take as jockey. Among a luxurious lineup of eight GI winners, the most in history, it was the 6th favorite with single win odds of 14.2. In the race, it was somewhat slow out of the gate, but Yutaka Take calmly guided it around the outside lanes during the race, advancing while keeping Chrono Genesis in sight at the key moment. In the final straight, it gradually extended its stride, finishing second, six lengths behind the winner Chrono Genesis but five lengths ahead of third-placed Mozu Bello, achieving consecutive placements in the Takarazuka Kinen for two years. After the race, jockey Yutaka Take commented, 'It settled down well, and the pace during the race was good. It was my winning pattern, but the winner was strong. Still, it was the first time in a while we could race like this horse usually does. I think this distance suits it too'.

For the autumn half, Kiseki would started with a race at the Kyoto Daishoten. This time, the jockey would be switched onto Suguru Hamanaka as his previous jockey, Take was unavailable due to Corona virus quarantine. For this race, he was selected as the favorite. When the gates opened, he got off to a slow start and trailed at the back of the pack for most of the race but gradually began to move up from the third corner. He made a strong charge in the straight, but was narrowly defeated by Glory Vase by three-quarters of a length to finish in second place.

At the Tenno Sho (Autumn), Yutaka Take would be back on the saddle to ride him. As the race started, he secured a good start and settled well along the way at third position but faded as the race progress and finished in fifth. For the next race in the Japan Cup, Kiseki was back to Suguru Hamanaka as Take went on to ride World Premiere. In this race, Kiseki set on a trailblazing pace at the start when the lead even went up to 20 lengths at one point. Kiseki stayed on the front until the final 100 metres when the leading pack overrun him. He ended up in eighth place on the day. He closed the season with a run at the Arima Kinen for the third going. He had an awful start, fell back early at 14th-place before trying to improve at the backstretch which to no avail, only managed to secure 12th-place at the line.

=== 2021: seven-year-old season ===
At the end of February, Katsuhiko Sumii's stable was de-established and Kiseki being moved onto Yasuyuki Tsujino's stable. His first race this season was decided to be at the Kinko Sho. For this race, he would be reunited with Mirco Demuro on the reins. He only managed to finish in fifth position that day. Demuro spoke that he seems out of rhythm, had a late start and did not tune it in at all during the race. In April, he would went to another overseas trip at the Sha Tin Racecourse in the Queen Elizabeth II Cup race. The race would saw the top four position was dominated by all Japanese horses - Loves Only You, Glory Vase, Daring Tact and himself in the fourth place. When he returned to Japan and finished his quarantine period, he would ran in the Takarazuka Kinen next in June. For this occasion, he was paired with Yuichi Fukunaga for the first time since he was a three-year-old. He ran in a good position and maintained a good rhythm throughout the race, but his pace slowed down gradually at the crucial point and he finished in fifth place. Fukunaga admitted that his acceleration around the corner was not quite to the level he expected.

In the off season between July to August, there would be a contest for fans to vote and create an idol horse of a racehorse that had never been made before or had been made in the past but was not currently for sale. In this contest, he came in third place behind Yoshio and Melody Lane. As Autumn arrived, Kiseki continued his season with a run at the Kyoto Daishoten on October 10 with Ryuji Wada at the saddle. When the race started, Kiseki was running at the third position into the middle section. At the third corner, Aristoteles tried to advanced but Kiseki, Belenes and Danburite moved inside and formed a wall to block it. Demuro who was riding Aristoteles, moved him to the outside of the three horses in front and urged him on meanwhile Kota Fujioka, who's jockeying Makahiki made the same move just on the other side nearing the final straight. With 100 metres to the line left, Aristoteles moved to the lead but Makahiki tailed him on and surpassed him to win by a neck, whilst Kiseki finished in third despite maintaining his pace along the way.

This great placement made him worthy for another attempt at the Japan Cup in November under Wada for the second race in a row. In this race, Kiseki held back after break, headway along backstretch, led rounding third corner and pulled away to open gap to six lengths, soon used up and outrun by foes at furlong pole. He ended up in tenth-place despite having a good start and lead. Soon after the race was concluded, it was being determined that Kiseki would ran for the last time at the Arima Kinen before became a breeding stallion. For this final race, he would be switching to a new jockey, Kohei Matsuyama. On the race day, he ran smoothly in the middle of the pack for most of the race but lacked acceleration in the final straight and finished in tenth-place for second time in a row. Despite a poor finish, Matsuyama was elated and said that "I am grateful that I was given the opportunity to ride him in his last race." His racehorse registration was terminated on 27 December and moved to be a stud at the Breeding Stallion Station in Hidaka, Hokkaido.

== Racing form ==
Kiseki won four races and struck podiums for 12 times out of 33 starts. This data is available based on JBIS, netkeiba, HKJC and racingpost.

Date	Track	Race	Grade	Distance (Condition)	Entry	HN	Odds (Favored)	Finish	Time	Margins	Jockey	Winner (Runner-up)
2016 – two-year-old season
Dec 11	Hanshin	2yo Newcomer		1,800 m (Firm)	8	4	2.4 (2)	1st	1:49.5	–0.6	Christophe Lemaire	(Granny's Chips)
2017 – three-year-old season
Jan 29	Tokyo	Saintpaulia Sho	ALW (1W)	1,800 m (Firm)	11	7	2.6 (1)	5th	1:48.1	0.4	Masayoshi Ebina	Daiwa Cagney
Feb 26	Hanshin	Sumire Stakes	OP	2,200 m (Firm)	7	5	1.9 (1)	3rd	2:15.0	0.9	Yuga Kawada	Clincher
Mar 25	Hanshin	Mainichi Hai	3	1,800 m (Firm)	8	6	32.8 (7)	3rd	1:46.7	0.2	Andrasch Starke	Al Ain
Jul 15	Chukyo	3yo+ Allowance	1W	2,000 m (Firm)	13	4	1.5 (1)	1st	1:59.1	–0.3	Yuichi Fukunaga	(Suzuka Deep)
Aug 5	Niigata	Shinanogawa Tokubetsu	ALW (2W)	2,000 m (Firm)	14	5	2.0 (1)	1st	1:56.9	–0.2	Mirco Demuro	(Black Platinum)
Sep 24	Hanshin	Kobe Shimbun Hai	2	2,400 m (Firm)	14	5	3.5 (2)	2nd	2:24.9	0.3	Mirco Demuro	Rey de Oro
Oct 22	Kyoto	Kikuka Sho	1	3,000 m (Heavy)	18	13	4.5 (1)	1st	3:18.9	–0.3	Mirco Demuro	(Clincher)
Dec 10	Sha Tin	Hong Kong Vase	1	2,400 m (Firm)	12	12	2.9 (2)	9th	2:27.7	1.5	Mirco Demuro	Highland Reel
2018 – four-year-old season
Mar 24	Nakayama	Nikkei Sho	2	2,500 m (Firm)	15	14	3.3 (1)	9th	2:34.6	0.7	Christophe Lemaire	Ganko
Jun 24	Hanshin	Takarazuka Kinen	1	2,200 m (Good)	16	16	5.7 (2)	8th	2:12.5	0.9	Mirco Demuro	Mikki Rocket
Oct 7	Tokyo	Mainichi Okan	2	1,800 m (Firm)	13	1	15.8 (6)	3rd	1:44.7	0.2	Yuga Kawada	Aerolithe
Oct 28	Tokyo	Tenno Sho (Autumn)	1	2,000 m (Firm)	12	10	12.8 (6)	3rd	1:57.0	0.2	Yuga Kawada	Rey de Oro
Nov 25	Tokyo	Japan Cup	1	2,400 m (Firm)	14	8	9.2 (4)	2nd	2:20.9	0.3	Yuga Kawada	Almond Eye
Dec 23	Nakayama	Arima Kinen	1	2,500 m (Good)	16	14	5.9 (2)	5th	2:32.8	0.6	Yuga Kawada	Blast Onepiece
2019 – five-year-old season
Mar 31	Hanshin	Osaka Hai	1	2,000 m (Firm)	14	6	4.1 (2)	2nd	2:01.0	0.0	Yuga Kawada	Al Ain
Jun 23	Hanshin	Takarazuka Kinen	1	2,200 m (Firm)	12	1	3.6 (1)	2nd	2:11.3	0.5	Yuga Kawada	Lys Gracieux
Sep 15	Longchamp	Prix Foy	2	2,400 m (Firm)	4	3	3.6 (2)	3rd	2:28.2	0.6	Christophe Soumillon	Waldgeist
Oct 6	Longchamp	Prix de l'Arc de Triomphe	1	2,400 m (Soft)	12	4	19.4 (7)	7th	2:36.3	4.3	Christophe Soumillon	Waldgeist
Dec 22	Nakayama	Arima Kinen	1	2,500 m (Firm)	16	11	27.1 (7)	5th	2:31.6	1.1	Ryan Moore	Lys Gracieux
2020 – six-year-old season
Mar 22	Hanshin	Hanshin Daishoten	2	3,000 m (Firm)	10	9	1.6 (1)	7th	3:03.6	0.6	Yuga Kawada	You Can Smile
May 3	Kyoto	Tenno Sho (Spring)	1	3,200 m (Firm)	14	8	5.3 (3)	6th	3:17.3	0.8	Yutaka Take	Fierement
Jun 28	Hanshin	Takarazuka Kinen	1	2,200 m (Good)	18	14	14.2 (6)	2nd	2:14.5	1.0	Yutaka Take	Chrono Genesis
Oct 11	Kyoto	Kyoto Daishoten	2	2,400 m (Good)	17	2	3.5 (1)	2nd	2:25.7	0.1	Suguru Hamanaka	Glory Vase
Nov 1	Tokyo	Tenno Sho (Autumn)	1	2,000 m (Firm)	12	8	16.7 (4)	5th	1:58.6	0.8	Yutaka Take	Almond Eye
Nov 29	Tokyo	Japan Cup	1	2,400 m (Firm)	15	4	44.6 (6)	8th	2:24.1	1.1	Suguru Hamanaka	Almond Eye
Dec 27	Nakayama	Arima Kinen	1	2,500 m (Firm)	16	6	24.9 (8)	12th	2:36.5	1.5	Suguru Hamanaka	Chrono Genesis
2021 – seven-year-old season
Mar 14	Chukyo	Kinko Sho	2	2,000 m (Soft)	10	7	10.0 (3)	5th	2:02.0	0.2	Mirco Demuro	Gibeon
Apr 25	Sha Tin	Queen Elizabeth II Cup	1	2,000 m (Firm)	7	4	14.5 (5)	4th	2:01.7	0.5	Chad Schofield	Loves Only You
Jun 27	Hanshin	Takarazuka Kinen	1	2,200 m (Firm)	13	13	16.6 (5)	5th	2:12.1	1.2	Yuichi Fukunaga	Chrono Genesis
Oct 10	Hanshin	Kyoto Daishoten	2	2,400 m (Firm)	14	11	7.4 (4)	3rd	2:24.6	0.1	Ryuji Wada	Makahiki
Nov 28	Tokyo	Japan Cup	1	2,400 m (Firm)	18	5	37.4 (7)	10th	2:26.0	1.3	Ryuji Wada	Contrail
Dec 26	Nakayama	Arima Kinen	1	2,500 m (Firm)	16	15	43.8 (7)	10th	2:33.6	1.6	Kohei Matsuyama	Efforia

Legend:
Turf

== Stud career ==
Kiseki entered stud duty with a fee of 800,000 yen for guarantee of conception and 1,200,000 yen for guarantee of live birth.

== In popular culture ==
An anthropomorphized version of Kiseki appears as a character in the Japanese multimedia franchise Umamusume: Pretty Derby, voiced by Seena Hoshiki. She is depicted as an immensely passionate and creative manga artist who dreams of becoming a protagonist with an illustrious racing career, and finds inspiration for her artistic work in the accomplishments of her peers through racing. Her love for manga is a reference to her real-life counterpart's owner, Tatsue Ishikawa, who is the CEO of Digimerce, an online manga distribution service.

== Pedigree ==
Pedigree of Kiseki (JPN), dark bay, stallion, 2014
Sire Rulership (JPN) 2007	King Kamehameha (JPN); 2001	Kingmambo	Mr. Prospector
Sire Rulership (JPN) 2007	King Kamehameha (JPN); 2001	Kingmambo	Miesque
Sire Rulership (JPN) 2007	King Kamehameha (JPN); 2001	Manfath	Last Tycoon
Sire Rulership (JPN) 2007	King Kamehameha (JPN); 2001	Manfath	Pilot Bird
Sire Rulership (JPN) 2007	Air Groove (JPN); 1993	Tony Bin	Kampala
Sire Rulership (JPN) 2007	Air Groove (JPN); 1993	Tony Bin	Severn Bridge
Sire Rulership (JPN) 2007	Air Groove (JPN); 1993	Dyna Carle	Northern Taste
Sire Rulership (JPN) 2007	Air Groove (JPN); 1993	Dyna Carle	Shadai Feather
Dam Blitz Finale (JPN) 2008	Deep Impact (JPN); 2002	Sunday Silence	Halo
Dam Blitz Finale (JPN) 2008	Deep Impact (JPN); 2002	Sunday Silence	Wishing Well
Dam Blitz Finale (JPN) 2008	Deep Impact (JPN); 2002	Wind in Her Hair	Alzao
Dam Blitz Finale (JPN) 2008	Deep Impact (JPN); 2002	Wind in Her Hair	Burghclere
Dam Blitz Finale (JPN) 2008	London Bridge (JPN); 1995	Dr. Devious	Ahonoora
Dam Blitz Finale (JPN) 2008	London Bridge (JPN); 1995	Dr. Devious	Rose of Jericho
Dam Blitz Finale (JPN) 2008	London Bridge (JPN); 1995	All for London	Danzig
Dam Blitz Finale (JPN) 2008	London Bridge (JPN); 1995	All for London	Full Card (Family: 22-b)

- Kiseki is an inbred by 5 x 5 to Northern Dancer (Northern Taste's and Danzig's sire)
- Kiseki's full sister, Big Ribbon, is the winner of the 2023 Mermaid Stakes.
