= Fierement =

Japanese-bred Thoroughbred racehorse

Fierement; フィエールマン
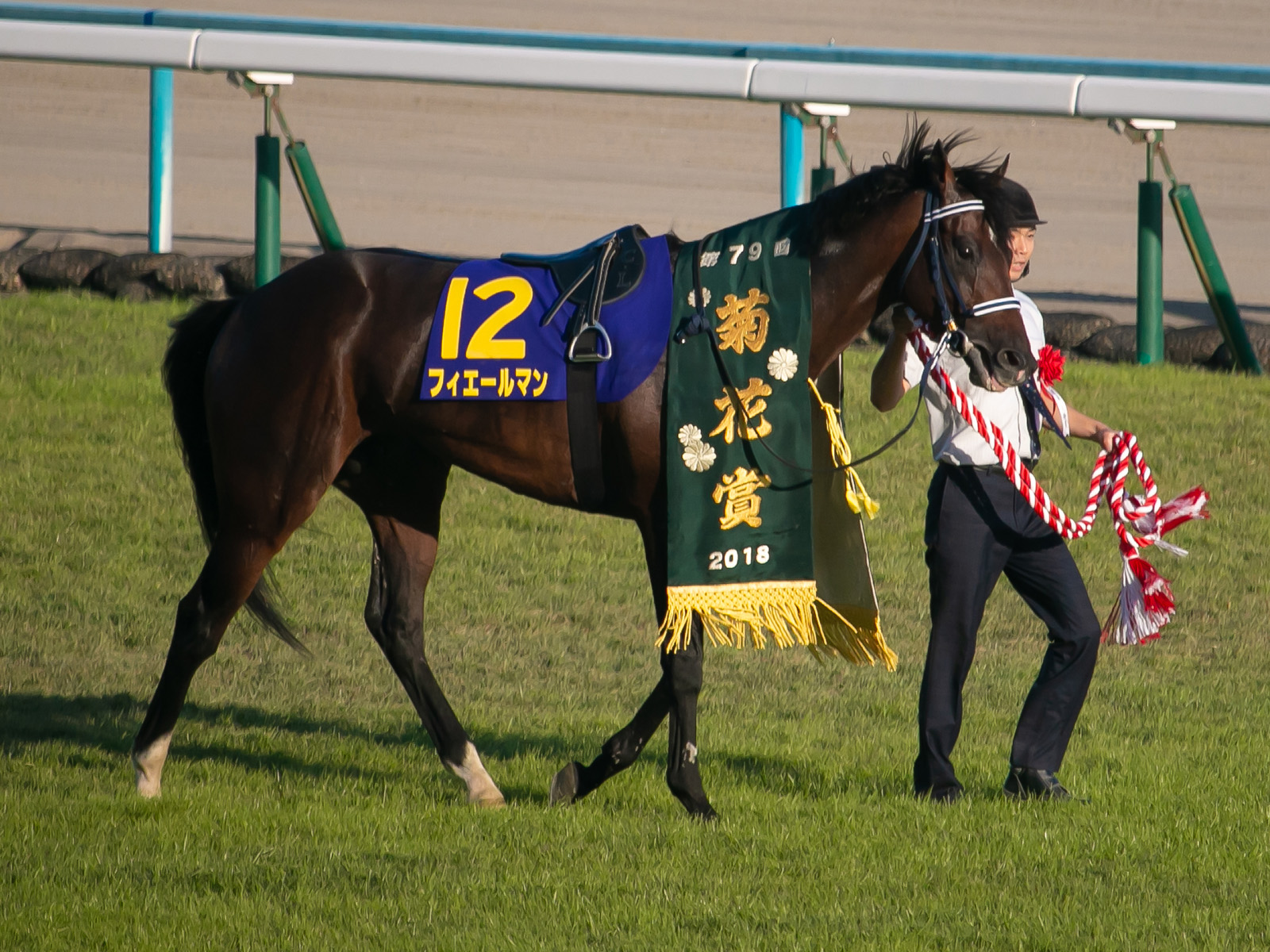
- Fierement in October 2018
- Sire: Deep Impact
- Grandsire: Sunday Silence
- Dam: Lune d'Or
- Damsire: Green Tune
- Sex: Stallion
- Foaled: 20 January 2015
- Country: Japan
- Colour: Bay
- Breeder: Northern Farm
- Owner: Sunday Racing Co Ltd
- Racing colours
- Trainer: Takahisa Tezuka
- Jockey: Christophe Lemaire
- Record: 12: 5-3-2
- Earnings: ¥709,265,000

Major wins
- Tennō Shō (Spring) (2019, 2020); Japanese Classic Race wins: Kikuka Sho (2018)

Awards
- JRA Award for Best Older Male Horse (2020)

Fierement, (Japanese: フィエールマン, foaled 20 January 2015) is a Japanese Thoroughbred racehorse. Unraced as a juvenile, he won his first two starts as a three-year-old before running second in the Radio Nikkei Sho and winning the Grade 1 Kikuka Sho on his final appearance of the year. In the following spring he finished runner-up in the American Jockey Club Cup before recording his second Grade 1 success in the spring edition of the Tenno Sho. As a five-year-old in 2020 he repeated his success in the spring Tenno Sho, ran second in the autumn edition of the same race and finished third in the Arima Kinen.

== Background ==
Fierement is a bay horse with a white star and white socks on his hind legs bred in Japan by Northern Farm. The horse entered the ownership of Sunday Racing and was sent into training with Takahisa Tezuka.

He was from the eighth crop of foals sired by Deep Impact, who was the Japanese Horse of the Year in 2005 and 2006, winning races including the Tokyo Yushun, Tenno Sho, Arima Kinen and Japan Cup. Deep Impact's other progeny include Gentildonna, Harp Star, Kizuna, A Shin Hikari, Marialite and Saxon Warrior.

Fierement's dam Lune d'Or was a top class racehorse in Europe, winning the Prix de Malleret, Prix de Pomone and Premio Lydia Tesio. In December 2010 she was sold at auction for €750,000 to Katsumi Yoshida and exported to Japan. Lune d'Or's dam Luth d'Or was a half sister to Luth Enchantee.

== Racing career ==
=== 2018: three-year-old season ===
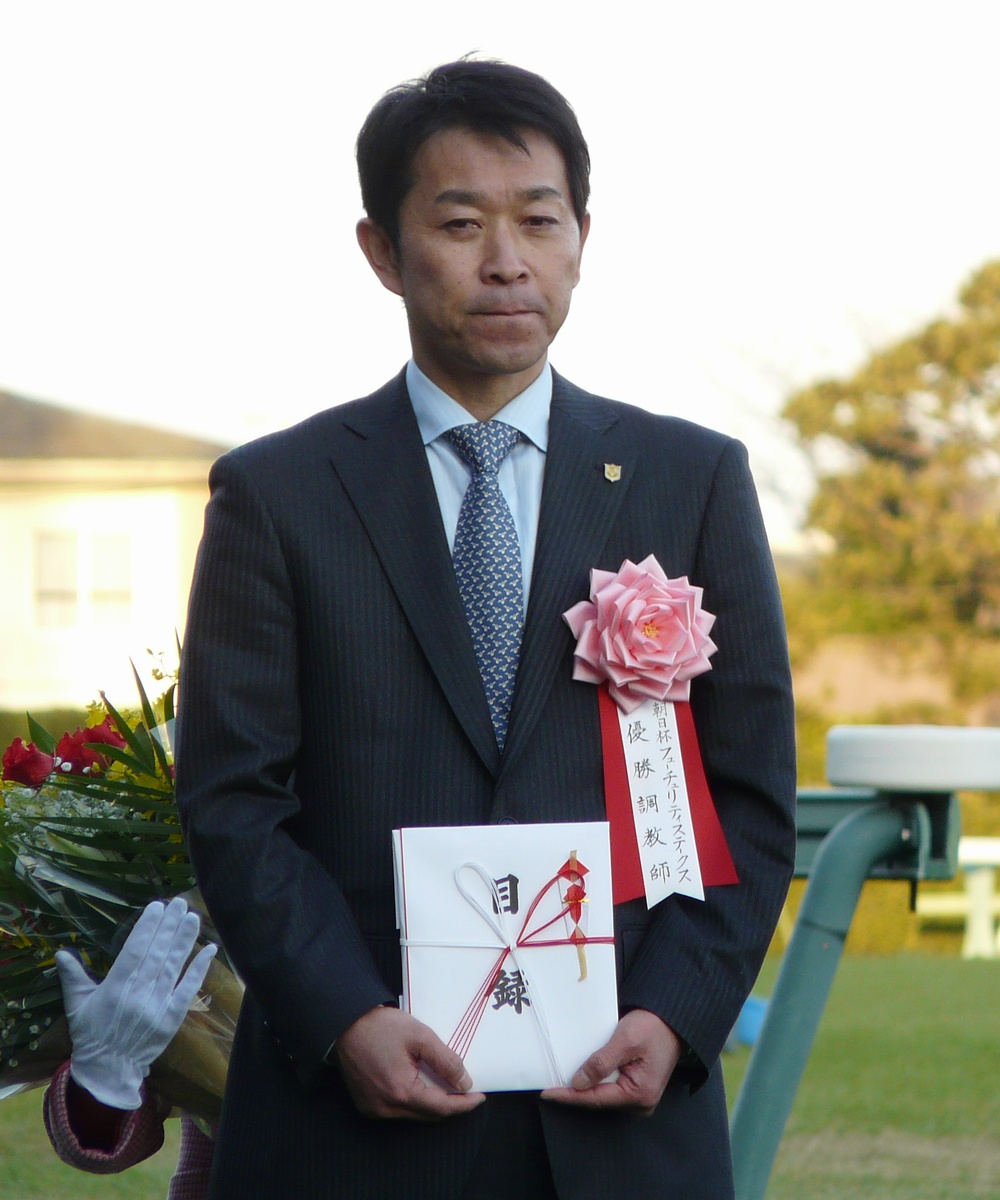
Fierement's trainer Takahisa Tezuka

Fierement did not race as a two-year-old, beginning his track career on 28 January 2018 when he won an event for previously unraced three-year-olds over 1800 metres at Tokyo Racecourse. Over the same distance at Nakayama Racecourse in April he won again as he took the Yamafuji Sho, beating Nishino Baseman and nine others. On 1 July the colt was stepped up in class and started the 1.5/1 favourite for the Grade 3 Radio Nikkei Sho over 1800 metres at Fukushima Racecourse. Ridden by Shu Ishibashi he raced towards the rear of the field and turned into the straight last of the thirteen runners. He made rapid late progress overtaking all but one of his rivals to finish second, half a length behind the winner Meishi Tekkon. Takahisa Tezuka later commented that the colt was unsuited by the track.

After a break of three and a half months Fierement returned in the Grade 1 Kikuka Sho over 3000 metres at Kyoto Racecourse on 21 October in which he was ridden by Christophe Lemaire and started at odds of 13.5/1 in an eighteen-runner field. Blast Onepiece started favourite, while the other contenders included Etario, Epoca d'Oro, Generale Uno (St Lite Kinen), Meisho Tekkon, Grail (Kyoto Nisai Stakes), Time Flyer (Hopeful Stakes) and Stay Foolish (Kyoto Shimbun Hai). Generale Uno set a steady pace from Kafuji Vanguard and Cosmic Force with Fierement settled in seventh place before threading his way through the field as the runners fanned out on the final turn. Etario, ridden by Mirco Demuro, hit the front in the straight but Fierement joined him 200 metres and got the better of a closely contested finish to win by a nose. After the race Lemaire said "I had confidence in him as he felt good during the training. We briefly met traffic in the straight but my mount stretched really well with his bursting kick. I congratulated Mirco right after crossing the wire, thinking that we had lost, so it's unbelievable that we were able to win the race".

In the 2018 World's Best Racehorse Rankings Fierement was rated the 21st best three-year-old colt in the world and the 118th best horse of any age or sex.

=== 2019: four-year-old season ===
On his four-year-old debut Fierement was made the odds-on favourite for the Grade 2 American Jockey Club Cup over 2200 metres at Nakayama on 20 January. With Lemaire in the saddle he raced in mid-division before finishing strongly, but failed by a head to catch the six-year-old Sciacchetra. Tezuka said that the horse had returned from the race with a "slight fever". On 28 April the colt contested the spring edition of the Tenno Sho over 3200 metres at Kyoto: it was the 159th running of the race (which is run twice a year) and the last of the Heisei era. He was made the 1.8/1 favourite ahead of his old rival Etario, while the other eleven runners included You Can Smile (Diamond Stakes), Clincher (Kyoto Kinen), Meisho Tekkon, Glory Vase (Nikkei Shinshun Hai) and Perform A Promise (Copa Republica Argentina). The outsider Vosges set the pace from Lord Vent d'Or and Meisho Tekkon with settling in seventh place until Lemaire made a forward move and sent the favourite into the lead on the final turn. He was soon joined by Glory Vase on the outside and the pair drew away from the field to engage in a sustained struggle over the last 400 metres before Fierement prevailed by a neck. There was a gap of six lengths back to Perform A Promise who took third place. Lemaire commented "It was a tough race to win but Fierement really showed his strength. He was able to relax early on which is important in a long-distance race like this... He's improving with every race".

In the Sapporo Kinen over 2000 metres at Sapporo Racecourse on 18 August Fierement started the 1.3/1 favourite but despite making strong progress in the straight he was unable to catch the leaders and finished third behind Blast Onepiece and Sungrazer. The colt was then sent to Europe to contest the Prix de l'Arc de Triomphe over 2400 metres at Longchamp Racecourse on 6 October. Racing on very soft ground he tracked the leaders before dropping out of contention in the last 600 metres and came home last of the twelve runners after being eased down by Lemaire in the closing stages. On his final appearance of the season Fierement contested the Arima Kinen over 2500 metres at Nakayama on 22 December in which he was ridden by Kenichi Ikezoe and finished fourth behind Lys Gracieux, Saturnalia and World Premiere.

In January 2020, at the JRA Awards for 2019, Fierement finished fourth to Win Bright, Indy Champ and Suave Richard in the poll to determine Best Older Male Horse.

=== 2020: five-year-old season ===
On his first run as a five-year-old on 3 May 2020 Fierement, with Lemaire in the saddle, attempted to become the fifth horse after Mejiro McQueen, T M Opera O, Fenomeno and Kitasan Black to win consecutive runnings of the spring Tenno Sho. In a race run behind closed doors owing to the COVID-19 pandemic. he went off the 1/1 favourite against thirteen opponents including You Can Smile, Kiseki (2017 Kikuka Sho), Mikki Swallow (Nikkei Sho), Mozu Bello (Nikkei Shinshun Hai), Etario, Danburite (Kyoto Kinen), Meisho Tengen (Yayoi Sho) and Stiffelio (Mile Championship). The favourite settled towards the rear as Kiseki set the pace from Danburite and Stiffelio and was still only seventh on the final turn but produced a sustained run on the outside and caught Stiffelio in the final strides to win by a nose. After the race Lemiare said "The pace was ideal and I was almost sure it would be an easy win for us, but he wasn't focused at times, so as it turned out we had to fight hard to the line. But in spite of the long distance and the wide draw, he was unhurried earlier in the race and had the strength left to charge home the way he did—everything went well. I'm thankful to the fans rooting for us at home. I look forward to seeing them in the stands very soon."

After the summer break Fierement returned to the track for the autumn edition of the Tenno Sho over 2000 metres at Tokyo on 1 November and started the 16.4/1 fifth choice in a twelve-runner field. The horse had been scheduled to reappear in the Sankei Sho All Comers at Nakayama in September but was found to be running a high temperature in training and was withdrawn from the race. Fierement raced towards the rear of the field and struggled to obtain a clear run early in the straight but produced a very strong late run to take second place, half a length behind Almond Eye and a neck in front of the third-placed Chrono Genesis. On 27 December Fierement started the 2.5/1 second favourite for the Arima Kinen over 2500 metres at Nakayama. After racing in second place behind the pace-setter Babbitt he took the lead entering the straight but was immediately challenged by Chrono Genesis. A sustained struggle ensued and after Chrono Genesis gained the advantage in the final strides, Fierement lost second place on the line to fast-finishing outsider Salacia.

In January 2021 Fierement was voted Best Older Male Horse at the JRA Awards for 2020. In the 2020 World's Best Racehorse Rankings, Fierement was rated on 123, making him the equal fifteenth best racehorse in the world.

== Racing form ==
Fierement won five races in 12 starts. This data is based on JBIS, netkeiba and racingpost.

Date	Track	Race	Grade	Distance (Condition)	Entry	HN	Odds (Favored)	Finish	Time	Margins	Jockey	Winner (Runner-up)
2018 – three-year-old season
Jan 28	Tokyo	3yo Newcomer		1,800 m (Firm)	16	16	1.7 (1)	1st	1:51.3	0.0	Shu Ishibashi	(Sunrise Shell)
Apr 14	Nakayama	Yamafuji Sho	ALW (1W)	1,800 m (Firm)	11	9	2.0 (1)	1st	1:48.1	–0.4	Shu Ishibashi	(Nishino Basement)
Jul 1	Fukushima	Radio Nikkei Sho	3	1,800 m (Firm)	13	6	2.5 (1)	2nd	1:46.2	0.1	Shu Ishibashi	Meisho Tekkon
Oct 21	Kyoto	Kikuka Sho	1	3,000 m (Firm)	18	12	14.5 (7)	1st	3:06.1	0.0	Christophe Lemaire	(Etario)
2019 – four-year-old season
Jan 20	Nakayama	American Jockey Club Cup	2	2,200 m (Firm)	11	4	1.7 (1)	2nd	2:13.7	0.0	Christophe Lemaire	Sciacchetra
Apr 28	Kyoto	Tennō Shō (Spring)	1	3,200 m (Firm)	13	10	2.8 (1)	1st	3:15.0	0.0	Christophe Lemaire	(Glory Vase)
Aug 18	Sapporo	Sapporo Kinen	2	2,000 m (Firm)	14	9	2.3 (1)	3rd	2:00.3	0.2	Christophe Lemaire	Blast Onepiece
Oct 6	Longchamp	Prix de l'Arc de Triomphe	1	2,400 m (Soft)	12	6	11.1 (4)	12th	2:41.6	9.6	Christophe Lemaire	Waldgeist
Dec 22	Nakayama	Arima Kinen	1	2,500 m (Firm)	16	5	18.4 (6)	4th	2:31.6	1.1	Kenichi Ikezoe	Lys Gracieux
2020 – five-year-old season
May 3	Kyoto	Tennō Shō (Spring)	1	3,200 m (Firm)	14	14	2.0 (1)	1st	3:16.5	0.0	Christophe Lemaire	(Stiffelio)
Nov 1	Tokyo	Tennō Shō (Autumn)	1	2,000 m (Firm)	12	6	17.4 (5)	2nd	1:57.9	0.1	Yuichi Fukunaga	Almond Eye
Dec 27	Nakayama	Arima Kinen	1	2,500 m (Firm)	16	15	3.5 (2)	3rd	2:35.1	0.1	Christophe Lemaire	Chrono Genesis

Legend:
Turf

== Pedigree ==
Pedigree of Fierement (JPN), bay colt 2015
Sire Deep Impact (JPN) 2002	Sunday Silence (USA); 1986	Halo	Hail to Reason
Sire Deep Impact (JPN) 2002	Sunday Silence (USA); 1986	Halo	Cosmah
Sire Deep Impact (JPN) 2002	Sunday Silence (USA); 1986	Wishing Well	Understanding
Sire Deep Impact (JPN) 2002	Sunday Silence (USA); 1986	Wishing Well	Mountain Flower
Sire Deep Impact (JPN) 2002	Wind in Her Hair (IRE); 1991	Alzao (USA)	Lyphard
Sire Deep Impact (JPN) 2002	Wind in Her Hair (IRE); 1991	Alzao (USA)	Lady Rebecca (GB)
Sire Deep Impact (JPN) 2002	Wind in Her Hair (IRE); 1991	Burghclere (GB)	Busted
Sire Deep Impact (JPN) 2002	Wind in Her Hair (IRE); 1991	Burghclere (GB)	Highclere
Dam Lune d'Or (FR) 2001	Green Tune (USA); 1991	Green Dancer	Nijinsky (CAN)
Dam Lune d'Or (FR) 2001	Green Tune (USA); 1991	Green Dancer	Green Valley (FR)
Dam Lune d'Or (FR) 2001	Green Tune (USA); 1991	Soundings	Mr. Prospector
Dam Lune d'Or (FR) 2001	Green Tune (USA); 1991	Soundings	Ocean's Answer (CAN)
Dam Lune d'Or (FR) 2001	Luth d'Or; 1983	Noir Et Or (GB)	Rheingold (IRE)
Dam Lune d'Or (FR) 2001	Luth d'Or; 1983	Noir Et Or (GB)	Pomme Rose (FR)
Dam Lune d'Or (FR) 2001	Luth d'Or; 1983	Viole d'Amour	Luthier
Dam Lune d'Or (FR) 2001	Luth d'Or; 1983	Viole d'Amour	Mandolinette (Family: 20-d)
