= Mikki Rocket =

Japanese Thoroughbred racehorse (foaled 2013)

Mikki Rocket; ミッキーロケット
- Mikki Rocket at the 2016 Kikuka Sho
- Breed: Thoroughbred
- Sire: King Kamehameha
- Grandsire: Kingmambo
- Dam: Moneycantbuymelove
- Damsire: Pivotal
- Sex: Stallion
- Foaled: 3 March 2013 (age 13)
- Country: Japan
- Colour: Bay
- Breeder: Northern Farm
- Owner: Mizuki Noda
- Racing colours
- Trainer: Hidetaka Otonashi
- Jockey: Ryuji Wada
- Record: 24: 5-6-0
- Earnings: ¥422,478,000

Major wins
- Nikkei Shinshun Hai (2017); Takarazuka Kinen (2018)
- Last updated on 18 September 2026

Mikki Rocket (Japanese: ミッキーロケット, Mikkī Roketto; foaled 3 March 2013) is a retired Japanese Thoroughbred racehorse and an active stud. He competed from 2015 until his retirement in 2018. He won the Nikkei Shinshun Hai in 2017 and well known for his upset win at the Takarazuka Kinen in 2018 as the seventh favourite for the day, beating the likes of Satono Diamond, Kiseki, Vivlos and the established Hong Kong's horse, Werther. The win became a major point for his main jockey, Ryuji Wada who won his first G1 race after 17 years since the 2001 Spring Tenno Sho with TM Opera O.

== Background ==
Mikki Rocket was foaled out of Moneycantbuymelove on 3 March 2013 at the Northern Farm in Abira, Hokkaido. His dam was the winner of the 2009 Sandringham Stakes and Height of Fashion Stakes. Moneycantbuymelove was sired by Pivotal, who won four races in six starts including the 1996 King's Stand Stakes and Nunthorpe Stakes. Meanwhile, the horse himself was sired by King Kamehameha, who was the two time leading sire in Japan and won the unique double of NHK Mile Cup and Tokyo Yushun in 2004. He shared the same sire as Lord Kanaloa, Apapane and Hokko Tarumae, to name a few.

He was sold as "Hip number 32" to Mizuki Noda at the price of ¥99,360,000 in the 2014 Select Sale for a Yearling (one-year-old foal). His name came from the stable name of his owner – Mikki and the space vehicle – Rocket.

== Racing career ==
=== 2015: two-year-old season ===
He made his debut with Suguru Hamanaka as his first jockey in the 1800 metres race at Hanshin Racecourse. He was picked as the number one favourite but finished in second place after Roi Absolu pulled away in the final straight and won by two and a half lengths.

=== 2016: three-year-old season ===
In his second start, the team switched his jockey to Fuma Matsuwaka. At the Kyoto Racecourse, Mikki Rocket stayed on the chase and picked up his first win at the line by three quarters of a length over Stay Kingdom. He stayed with Matsuwaka for two more races in which he finished second in both Baika Sho and Tsubaki Sho. In March, he raced in his first graded stakes race, the Spring Stakes with a new jockey, Christophe Lemaire. On the day, he was a bit fidgety in the gate, which caused a late start, but he still finished in fifth position. This result was enough for him to qualify for the Satsuki Sho. In this race, Norihiro Yokoyama took the assignment and kept him mostly at the back, and although he tried to turn wide for position, he never improved much and finished 13th on the line.

He skipped the whole remaining spring and returned to racing in the three-year-old and above allowance race at the Hakodate Racecourse in July. In this race, he had a new partner, Kenichi Ikezoe who rode him on the fifth position mostly before riding towards the front in the final phase and won the race by two lengths over Longs Peak. Then, Ikezoe guided him for a second place at the Matsumae Tokubetsu and gained his third career win at the HTB Sho with a comeback from behind victory. One month later, he raced in the Kikuka Sho's trial race, the Kobe Shimbun Hai with his eventual main jockey, Ryuji Wada for the first time. Wada managed to conserve his energy during the race and closed the gap with the fastest final three furlong speed but narrowly defeated at the line by Satono Diamond. This result qualified him for the Kikuka Sho as Wada stuck as his jockey for this big race. In the race, he tailed Satono Diamond from the start. At the final corner, he turned wide to make a bid but failed to accelerate fast enough as he finished in fifth place.

=== 2017: four-year-old season ===
Mikki Rocket started this year with a run at the Nikkei Shinshun Hai in January. In the race, he nailed a good start, held on to the race pace well enough, and snatched his first graded race victory by a nose against the first favourite, Sciacchetra. Wada was relieved after the race as he praised the horse's effort to fight for the win from the back. Then, he ran in the Kyoto Kinen, where his late start behaviour costed him again despite his excellent run as he finished in fourth place behind the winner, Satono Crown. He completed the spring campaign with a failed inside rail challenge as he finished seventh in the Osaka Hai and a botched late acceleration in the Takarazuka Kinen, where he finished in sixth place.

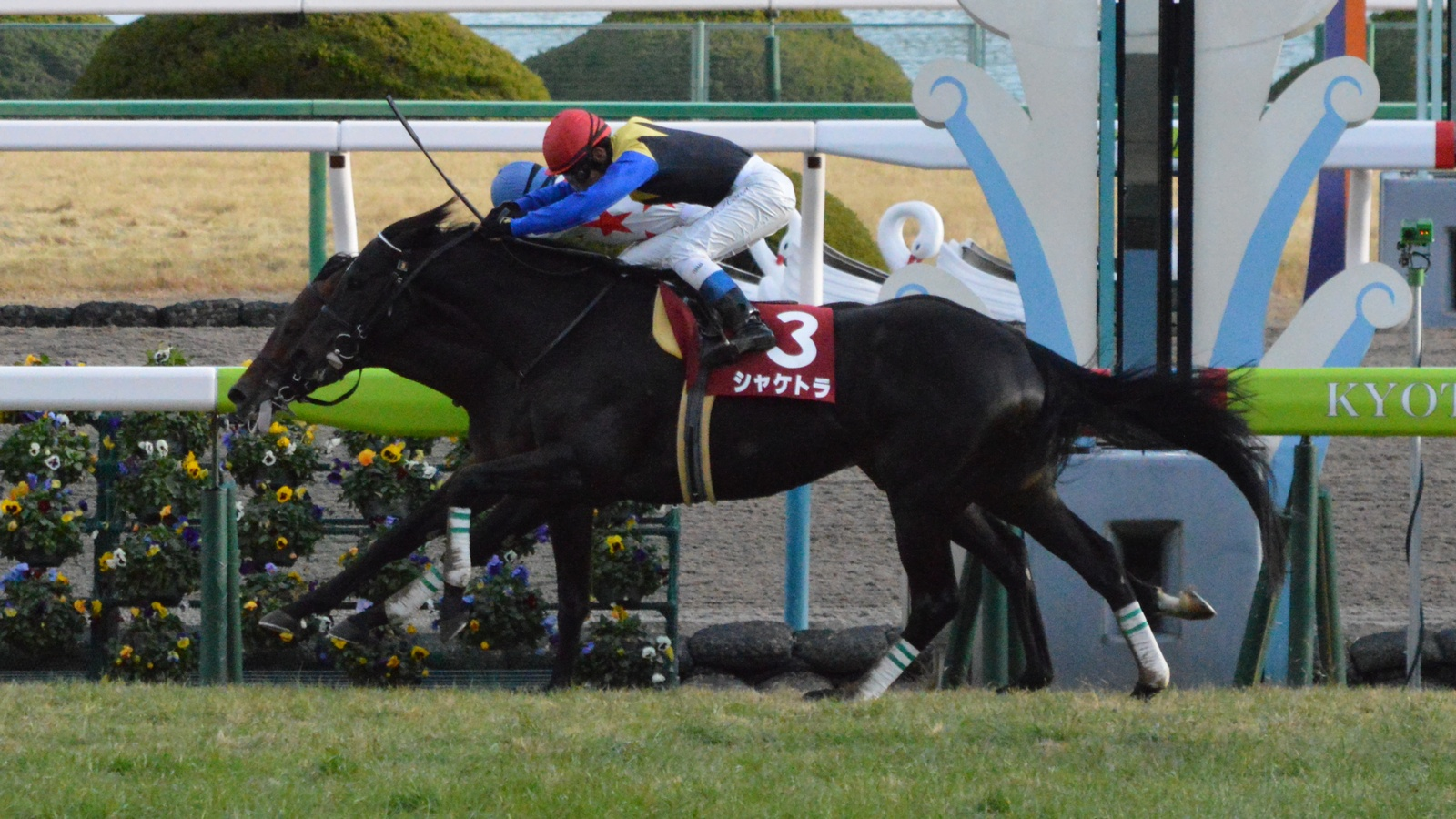
Mikki Rocket (blue helmet) stole the win against Sciacchetra (red helmet) by a nose at the 2017 Nikkei Shinshun Hai

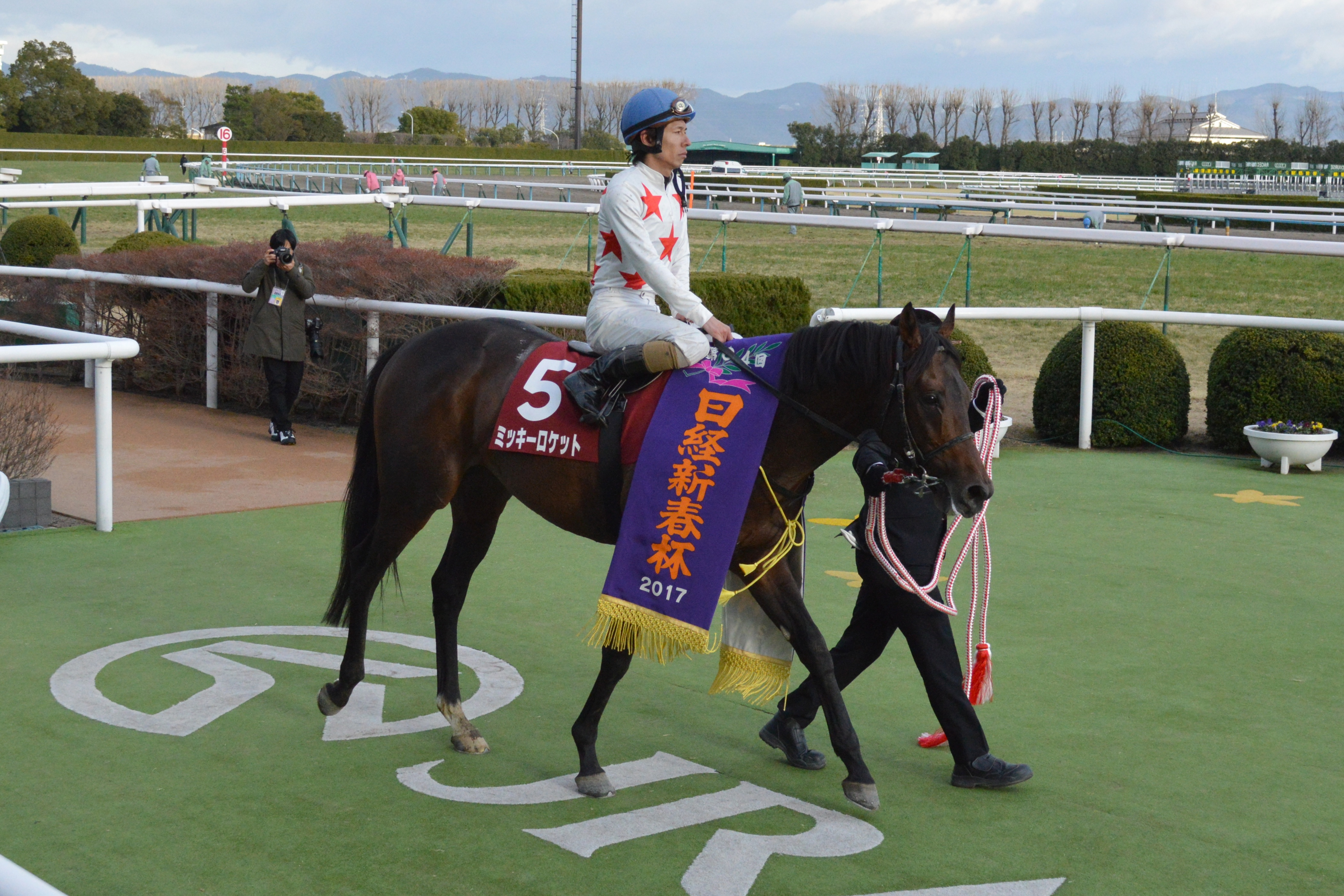
Mikki Rocket with Wada at the winning circle of the race

He returned for the autumn campaign at the Kyoto Daishoten in October. In this race, Wada rode him in sixth position throughout the race. They even fell back to eighth as they reached the final corner before making up ground in the final straight to finish fourth on the day. This race was a good preparation for the Autumn Tenno Sho in late October. When the race began, Mikki Rocket ran amongst the leading group in fourth position. As the race progressed, the poor track conditions started to affect his racing pace as he gradually dropped out of contention. In the end, he finished in 12th place. Despite the recent poor performances, he finished the season on a high note as he finished in second place by one and a half lengths behind the winner, Maitres d'Art at the Chunichi Shimbun Hai. Post-race, Wada noted that the horse might prefer the outer wall to get the pace.

=== 2018: five-year-old season ===
This year, Mikki Rocket attempted to defend his title at the Nikkei Shinshun Hai. He stayed mostly in the front group, mingling between third and fourth position, but failed to accelerate further, as he finished in fourth place. In February, Matsuwaka who rode him in his early career, returned as his jockey for this year's Kyoto Kinen. The result was mediocre as the horse never made a great impression on a soft track and finished in seventh for the day. Matsuwaka said that the race was going on as planned but other horses able to punch early on the position and tired him out. After this race, he went straight to the Spring Tenno Sho and drawn to the innermost stall, gate 1. The returning Wada rode him in seventh position as he tried to conserve energy in the final phase. He struck the inner rails at the stretch and accelerated forward but he weakened on his final few strides, finishing in fourth place behind Rainbow Line, Cheval Grand and Clincher. Mikki Rocket attempted another run at the Takarazuka Kinen as his spring closing race. As the gates opened, the seventh favourite settled in mid-division, around seventh from the front. He progressed gradually along the rails at the backstretch and maintained that position throughout both second and third corners and into the homestretch. He surged forward on the inside as Satono Diamond pulled to the outside before fading out. Meanwhile, Mikki Rocket maintained that pace and held on to Werther's challenge at the final 200 metres to win his first G1 race by a neck. Wada, who was overjoyed after ending his G1 drought for 17 years, quoted:

The track was dry, so I was planning to take the good inside route. He got a good start, which was reassuring. The pace was fast in front, but if he can keep up at the crucial point, he's a horse that will do his best in the straight. We've been riding together for a long time, and I was able to make the most of his strengths. He maintained his pace until the end; he's an amazing horse. (On his first G1 victory in 17 years) It's been a long time. TM Opera O gave me a boost. I want to go to Opera O with my head held high.

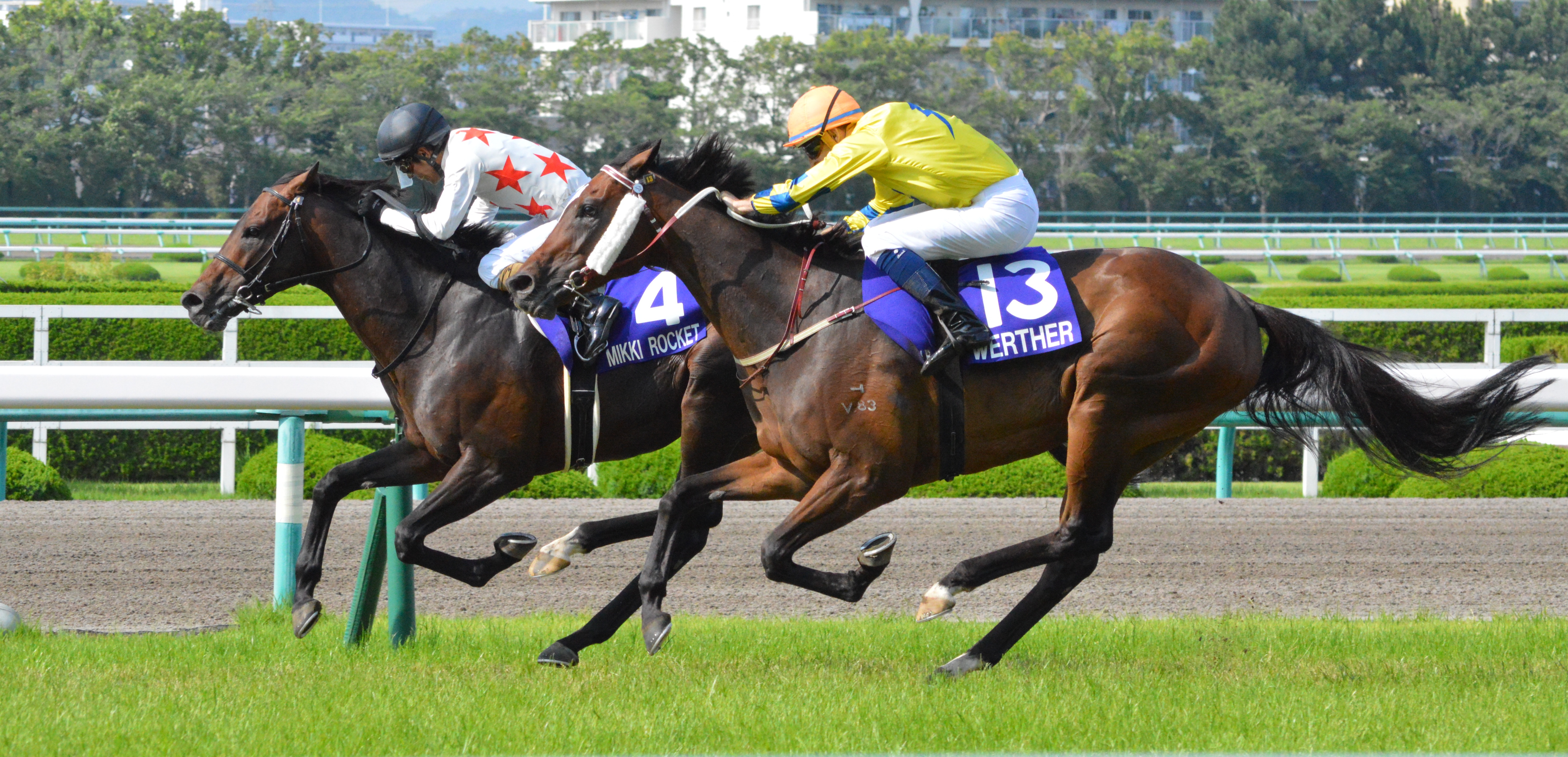
Mikki Rocket (left) won the duel against Werther at the 2018 Takarazuka Kinen

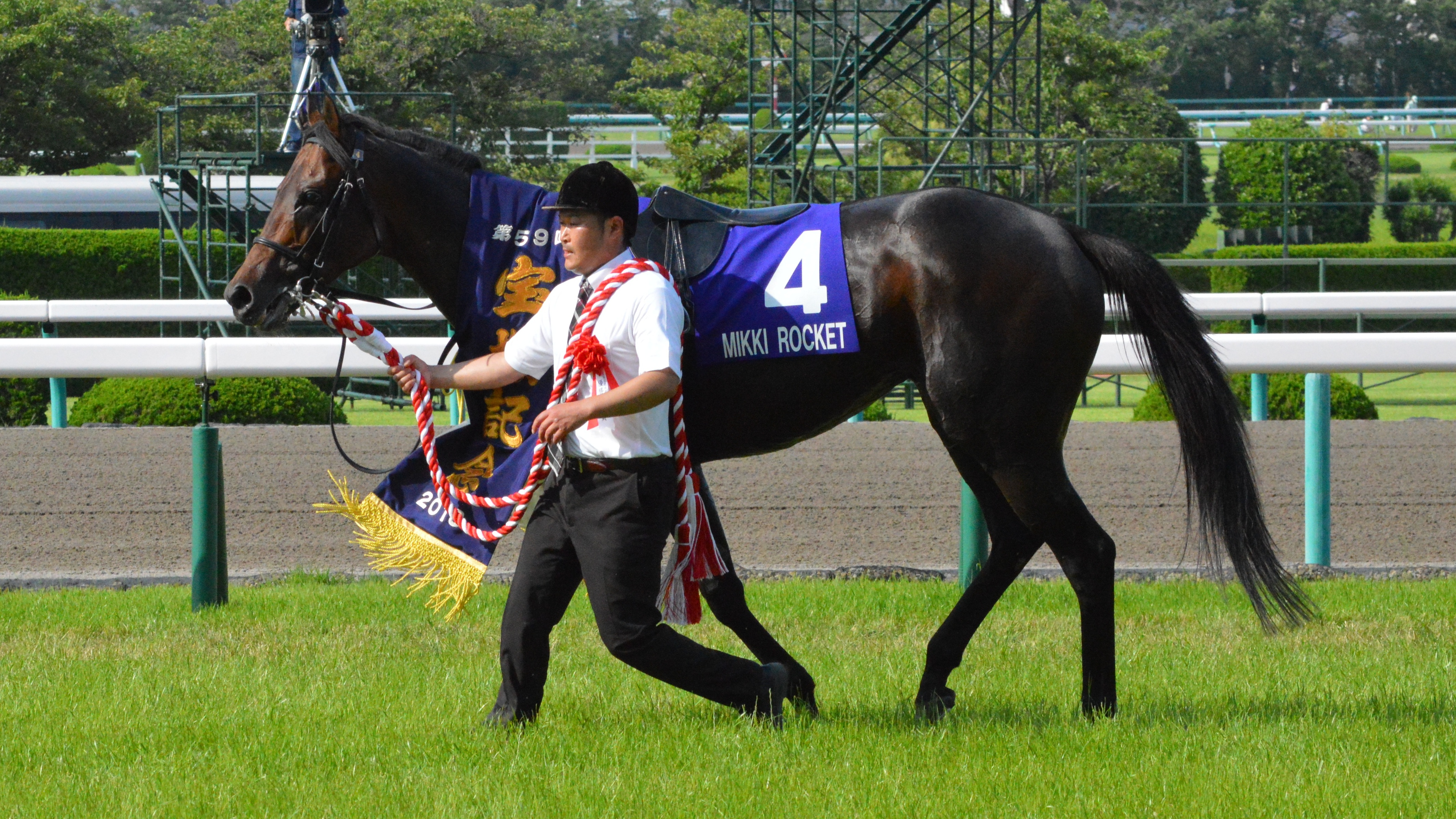
Mikki Rocket with his winning sash after the race.

He returned for the second attempt at the Autumn Tenno Sho in October. In this race, Wada rode him consistently at the same pace in fifth position. He made slight progress near the end but stuck in the same position as he crossed the line. Due to an injury for Wada, he was supposed to be ridden by Keita Tosaki in the Japan Cup but this race never materialised for him as the team withdrew him due to muscle pain in his right hind leg. He recovered from the injury and fit enough to join the Arima Kinen as the season ender with a new jockey, Oisin Murphy who's on the short term license from JRA. As the race started, Murphy rode him into second position along the way in the early to middle sector. The horse ran as fast as he could but few late chargers surpassed him in the homestretch as he finished in fourth place behind the winner, Blast Onepiece. Right after this race, there was a plan to prolong his career with a start at the Kyoto Kinen in the next year but due to the concerns about his legs, the team decided to retire him from racing. He would become a stud at the Yushun Stallion Station in Niikappu, Hokkaido.

== Racing form ==
Mikki Rocket won five races and placed second six times out of 24 starts. This data is available based on JBIS and netkeiba.

Date	Track	Race	Grade	Distance (Condition)	Entry	HN	Odds (Favored)	Finish	Time	Margins	Jockey	Winner (Runner-up)
2015 – two-year-old season
Dec 12	Hanshin	2yo Newcomer		1,800 m (Good)	14	14	2.5 (1)	2nd	1:50.6	0.4	Suguru Hamanaka	Roi Absolu
2016 – three-year-old season
Jan 11	Kyoto	3yo Maiden		1,800 m (Firm)	16	6	2.4 (1)	1st	1:48.9	–0.1	Fuma Matsuwaka	(Stay Kingdom)
Jan 30	Kyoto	Baika Sho (ALW)	1W	2,400 m (Soft)	11	8	4.4 (3)	2nd	2:30.3	0.4	Fuma Matsuwaka	Admire Daio
Feb 21	Kyoto	Tsubaki Sho (ALW)	1W	1,800 m (Good)	9	3	2.0 (1)	2nd	1:52.6	0.2	Fuma Matsuwaka	Namura Shingun
Mar 20	Nakayama	Spring Stakes	GII	1,800 m (Firm)	11	7	6.3 (2)	5th	1:48.4	0.3	Christophe Lemaire	Mount Robson
Apr 17	Nakayama	Satsuki Sho	GI	2,000 m (Firm)	18	8	150.4 (14)	13th	2:00.0	2.1	Norihiro Yokoyama	Dee Majesty
Jul 10	Hakodate	3yo+ Allowance	1W	2,000 m (Firm)	11	5	1.9 (1)	1st	2:00.8	–0.3	Kenichi Ikezoe	(Longs Peak)
Jul 24	Hakodate	Matsumae Tokubetsu (ALW)	2W	2,000 m (Firm)	13	11	1.6 (1)	2nd	1:59.9	0.2	Kenichi Ikezoe	Carvalho
Aug 14	Sapporo	HTB Sho (ALW)	2W	2,000 m (Firm)	13	8	1.6 (1)	1st	2:02.4	–0.1	Kenichi Ikezoe	(Forward Cafe)
Sep 25	Hanshin	Kobe Shimbun Hai	GII	2,400 m (Firm)	15	15	27.4 (6)	2nd	2:25.7	0.0	Ryuji Wada	Satono Diamond
Oct 23	Kyoto	Kikuka Sho	GI	3,000 m (Firm)	18	8	12.2 (4)	5th	3:04.0	0.7	Ryuji Wada	Satono Diamond
2017 – four-year-old season
Jan 17	Kyoto	Nikkei Shinshun Hai	GII	2,400 m (Good)	14	5	2.9 (1)	1st	2:25.7	0.0	Ryuji Wada	(Sciacchetra)
Feb 12	Kyoto	Kyoto Kinen	GII	2,200 m (Good)	10	9	3.4 (2)	4th	2:14.4	0.3	Ryuji Wada	Satono Crown
Apr 2	Hanshin	Osaka Hai	GI	2,000 m (Firm)	14	1	14.6 (6)	7th	1:59.4	0.5	Ryuji Wada	Kitasan Black
Jun 25	Hanshin	Takarazuka Kinen	GI	2,200 m (Good)	11	1	32.5 (8)	6th	2:12.3	0.9	Ryuji Wada	Satono Crown
Oct 9	Kyoto	Kyoto Daishoten	GII	2,400 m (Firm)	15	5	5.4 (3)	4th	2:23.3	0.3	Ryuji Wada	Smart Layer
Oct 29	Tokyo	Tenno Sho (Autumn)	GI	2,000 m (Heavy)	18	10	63.4 (14)	12th	2:10.9	2.6	Ryuji Wada	Kitasan Black
Dec 9	Chukyo	Chunichi Shimbun Hai	GIII	2,000 m (Firm)	18	10	4.0 (14)	2nd	1:59.5	0.2	Ryuji Wada	Maitre d'Art
2018 – five-year-old season
Jan 14	Kyoto	Nikkei Shinshun Hai	GII	2,400 m (Firm)	12	8	3.8 (2)	4th	2:27.2	0.9	Ryuji Wada	Perform a Promise
Feb 11	Kyoto	Kyoto Kinen	GII	2,200 m (Soft)	10	9	19.7 (7)	7th	2:17.4	1.1	Fuma Matsuwaka	Clincher
Apr 29	Kyoto	Tenno Sho (Spring)	GI	3,200 m (Firm)	17	1	38.5 (9)	4th	3:16.4	0.2	Ryuji Wada	Rainbow Line
Jun 24	Hanshin	Takarazuka Kinen	GI	2,200 m (Good)	16	4	13.1 (7)	1st	2:11.6	0.0	Ryuji Wada	(Werther)
Oct 28	Tokyo	Tenno Sho (Autumn)	GI	2,000 m (Firm)	12	11	22.0 (8)	5th	1:57.2	0.4	Ryuji Wada	Rey de Oro
Dec 23	Nakayama	Arima Kinen	GI	2,500 m (Firm)	16	11	22.5 (8)	4th	2:32.7	0.5	Oisin Murphy	Blast Onepiece

Legend:
Turf

== Stud career ==
Mikki Rocket stayed as a stud at the Yushun Stallion Station until he was moved in 2025 to Storm Farm Corporation in Ōzu, Kumamoto and continued his stud duty there.

=== Notable progeny ===
c = colt, f = filly, g = gelding

Foaled	Name	Sex	Major Wins
2020	Mikki Gorgeous	f	Aichi Hai

== Pedigree ==
Pedigree of Mikki Rocket (JPN), bay horse, 2013
Sire King Kamehameha (JPN) 2001	Kingmambo (USA); 1990	Mr. Prospector	Raise a Native
Sire King Kamehameha (JPN) 2001	Kingmambo (USA); 1990	Mr. Prospector	Gold Digger
Sire King Kamehameha (JPN) 2001	Kingmambo (USA); 1990	Miesque	Nureyev
Sire King Kamehameha (JPN) 2001	Kingmambo (USA); 1990	Miesque	Pasadoble
Sire King Kamehameha (JPN) 2001	Manfath (IRE); 1991	Last Tycoon	Try My Best
Sire King Kamehameha (JPN) 2001	Manfath (IRE); 1991	Last Tycoon	Mill Princess
Sire King Kamehameha (JPN) 2001	Manfath (IRE); 1991	Pilot Bird	Blakeney
Sire King Kamehameha (JPN) 2001	Manfath (IRE); 1991	Pilot Bird	The Dancer
Dam Moneycantbuymelove (IRE) 2006	Pivotal (GB); 1993	Polar Falcon	Nureyev
Dam Moneycantbuymelove (IRE) 2006	Pivotal (GB); 1993	Polar Falcon	Marie d'Argonne
Dam Moneycantbuymelove (IRE) 2006	Pivotal (GB); 1993	Fearless Revival	Cozzene
Dam Moneycantbuymelove (IRE) 2006	Pivotal (GB); 1993	Fearless Revival	Stufida
Dam Moneycantbuymelove (IRE) 2006	Sabreon (GB); 1997	Caerleon	Nijinsky
Dam Moneycantbuymelove (IRE) 2006	Sabreon (GB); 1997	Caerleon	Foreseer
Dam Moneycantbuymelove (IRE) 2006	Sabreon (GB); 1997	Sabria	Miswaki
Dam Moneycantbuymelove (IRE) 2006	Sabreon (GB); 1997	Sabria	Flood (family: 4-n)

- Mikki Rocket was an inbred of Mr Prospector by 3 x 5 (Miswaki's sire), Nureyev by 4 x 4, Northern Dancer by 5 x 5 x 5 x 5 (Nureyev's, Try My Best's and Nijinsky's sire) and Special by 5 x 5 (Nureyev's dam).
