= Rainbow Line =

Japanese-bred Thoroughbred racehorse

Rainbow Line; レインボーライン
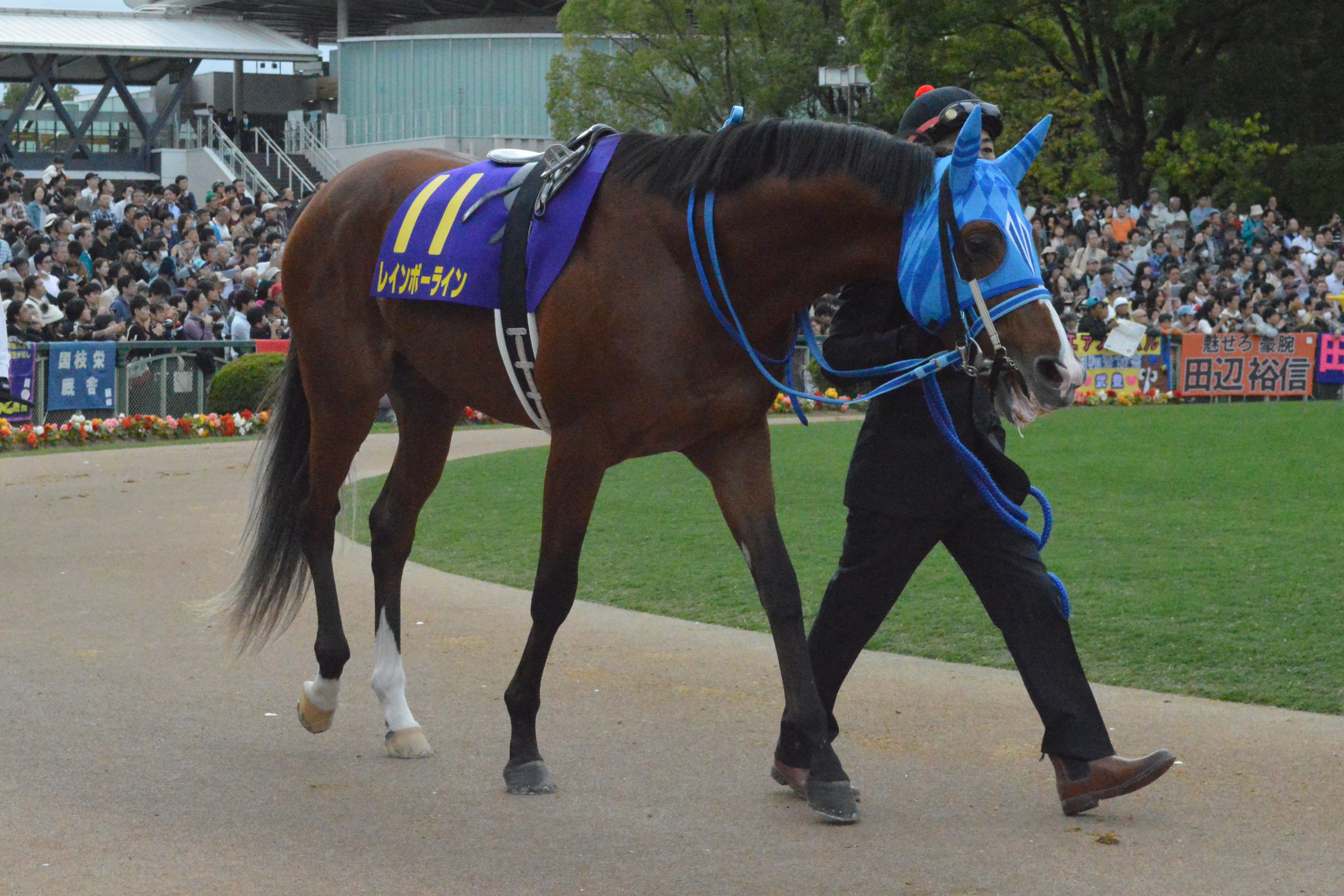
- Rainbow Line in October 2016
- Sire: Stay Gold
- Grandsire: Sunday Silence
- Dam: Regenbogen
- Damsire: French Deputy
- Sex: Stallion
- Foaled: 1 April 2013
- Country: Japan
- Colour: Bay
- Breeder: Northern Farm
- Owner: Masahiro Mita
- Racing colours
- Trainer: Hidekazu Asami
- Jockey: Yasunari Iwata
- Record: 22: 5-3-4
- Earnings: ¥450,466,000

Major wins
- Arlington Cup (2016); Hanshin Daishoten (2018); Tenno Sho (spring) (2018)

Rainbow Line, (Japanese: レインボーライン, foaled 1 April 2013) is a Japanese Thoroughbred racehorse and sire. He showed promise as a two-year-old in 2015 when he won two of his five starts. In the following year he recorded his first important victory in the Grade 3 Arlington Cup and went on to finish third in the NHK Mile Cup and second in the Kikuka Sho. He failed to win in 2017 but ran well in several major races. He reached his peak in the spring of 2018 when he won the Hanshin Daishoten and the spring edition of the Tenno Sho but sustained a career-ending injury in the latter race. He was a "hold-up" horse who was typically restrained at the rear of the field before unleashing a late run.

== Background ==
Rainbow Line is a bay horse with a white blaze and white socks on his hind legs bred in Japan by Northern Farm. As a yearling in 2014 the colt was consigned to the JRA Select Sale and was bought for ¥54,000,000 by Sanseisha Co. He entered the ownership of Masahiro Mita and was sent into training with Hidekazu Asami. Rainbow Line usually raced in blinkers.

His sire, Stay Gold, a son of the thirteen-time Leading sire in Japan Sunday Silence, was a successful international performer, winning the Dubai Sheema Classic and the Hong Kong Vase. Standing at stud at the Big Red Farm in Hokkaido, he produced numerous important winners including Gold Ship, Orfevre, and Nakayama Festa.

Rainbow Line's dam Regenbogen showed modest racing results, one minor race from four starts as a three-year-old in 2005. She proved a successful broodmare whose other foals Animate Bio who won the Rose Stakes and finished second in the Shuka Sho. Regenbogen was a great-granddaughter of the imported French-bred mare Petite Amie, who was in turn a female-line descendant of the British mare Jury, making her distantly related to many good winners including Roland Gardens and Kooyonga.

== Racing career ==
=== 2015: two-year-old season ===
Rainbow Line began his racing career by running second in a contest for previously unraced juveniles over 1800 metres at Sapporo Racecourse on 2 August 2015. After finishing runner up over the same course and distance two weeks later he opened his winning account in a maiden race (again over 1800 metres at Sapporo) on 30 August as he won from Tizona and seven others. After a two-month break the colt was stepped up in class for the Listed Hagi Stakes at Kyoto Racecourse and finished third behind Black Spinel and Smart Odin. Despite he was promoted again to contest the Grade 3 Tokyo Sports Hai Nisai Stakes at Tokyo Racecourse on 23 November in which he started a 36/1 outsider and came home ninth of the eleven runners behind Smart Odin. On his final start of the year Rainbow Line was dropped back in distance for the Senryo Sho over 1600 metres at Hanshin Racecourse on 27 December and won narrowly from Sunrise Couronne.

=== 2016: three-year-old season ===
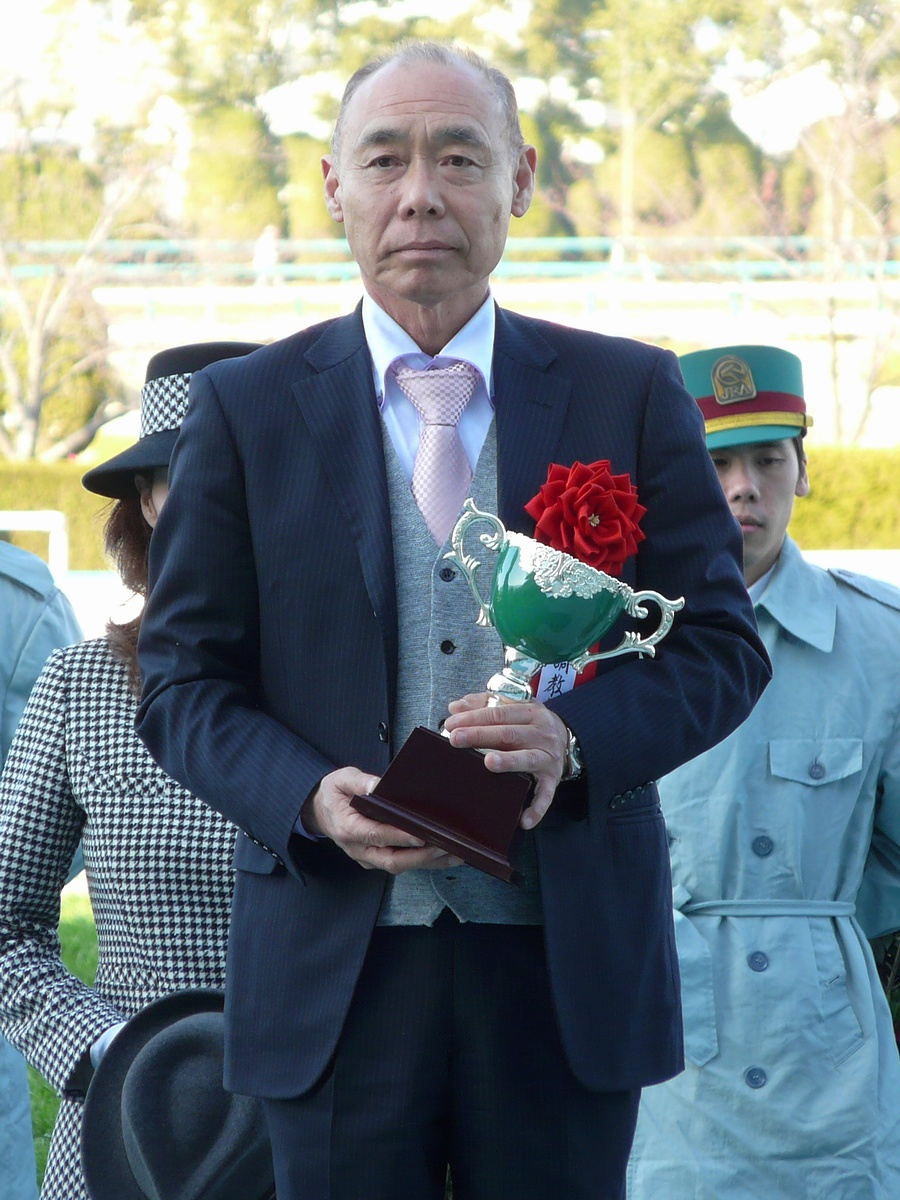
Rainbow Line's trainer Hidekazu Asami

Two weeks after his last start of 2015, Rainbow Line began his second campaign in the Shinzan Kinen at Kyoto and finished sixth of the eighteen runners behind Logi Cry. On 27 February at Hanshin the colt contested the Grade 3 Arlington Cup over 1600 metres on firm ground and started the 5.8/1 fourth choice in the betting behind Urban Kid, Ball Lightning (Keio Hai Nisai Stakes) and Hiruno Magellan. Ridden by Mirco Demuro he raced towards the rear of the field before moving up on the wide outside on the final turn and staying on strongly in the straight. In a "blanket finish" which saw the first five finishers separated by less than a half a length he prevailed by a nose from Dantsu Prius.

The Grade 2 New Zealand Trophy at Nakayama Racecourse on 9 April saw another very tight finish and Rainbow Line was beaten less than a length as he finished fifth behind Dantsu Prius. On 8 May the colt was stepped up to Grade 1 class for the first time to contest the NHK Mile Cup at Tokyo and started a 40/1 outsider. Ridden by Yuichi Fukunaga he exceeded expectations as he stayed on strongly in the straight to finish a close third behind Major Emblem and Lord Quest. He was then moved up in distance for the Tokyo Yushun three weeks later in which he started at odds of 154/1 and came home eighth of the eighteen runners behind Makahiki.

After a break of two and a half months Rainbow Line returned to the track in August when he was matched against older horses for the first time in the Grade 2 Sapporo Kinen. With Fukunaga in the saddle he came from the rear of the field with a strong late run to take third place behind the five-year-olds Neorealism and Maurice. In October the colt was moved up again in trip for the Kikuka Sho over 3000 metres at Kyoto and started a 23.9/1 outsider in an eighteen-runner field. After racing towards the rear for most of the way he produced an "impressive late charge" to take second place behind Satono Diamond with Air Spinel and Dee Majesty finishing close behind in third and fourth. On his final run of the season in the Japan Cup on 27 October Rainbow Line produced his customary late run from the rear of the field to come home sixth of the seventeen starters, four lengths behind the winner Kitasan Black.

In the 2016 edition of the World's Best Racehorse Rankings Rainbow Line was given a rating of 116, making him the 158th best racehorse in the world.

=== 2017: four-year-old season ===
Rainbow Line began his third season by running fourth behind Sciacchetra in the Nikkei Sho over 2500 metres at Nakayama on 25 March. Five weeks later he ran poorly in the spring edition of the Tenno Sho over 3200 metres at Kyoto as he finished twelfth of the seventeen runners behind Kitasan Black. After this race Yasunari Iwata took over the ride and partnered the horse in all of his subsequent starts. In the Takarazuka Kinen in June the colt produced a better effort as he came home fifth of the eleven runners behind Satono Crown.

After a break of more than five months Rainbow Line returned in the autumn edition of the Tenno Sho in which he started a 58.6/1 outsider and produced a strong late run to take third place behind Kitasan Black and Satono Crown. IN November the colt contested his second Japan Cup and repeated his 2017 result as he finished sixth behind Cheval Grand having turned into the straight last of the seventeen runners. He ended the year by running eighth behind Kitasan Black in the Arima Kinen at Nakayama on 24 December.

In the 2017 edition of the World's Best Racehorse Rankings Rainbow Line was given a rating of 118, making him the 90th best racehorse in the world.

=== 2018: five-year-old season ===
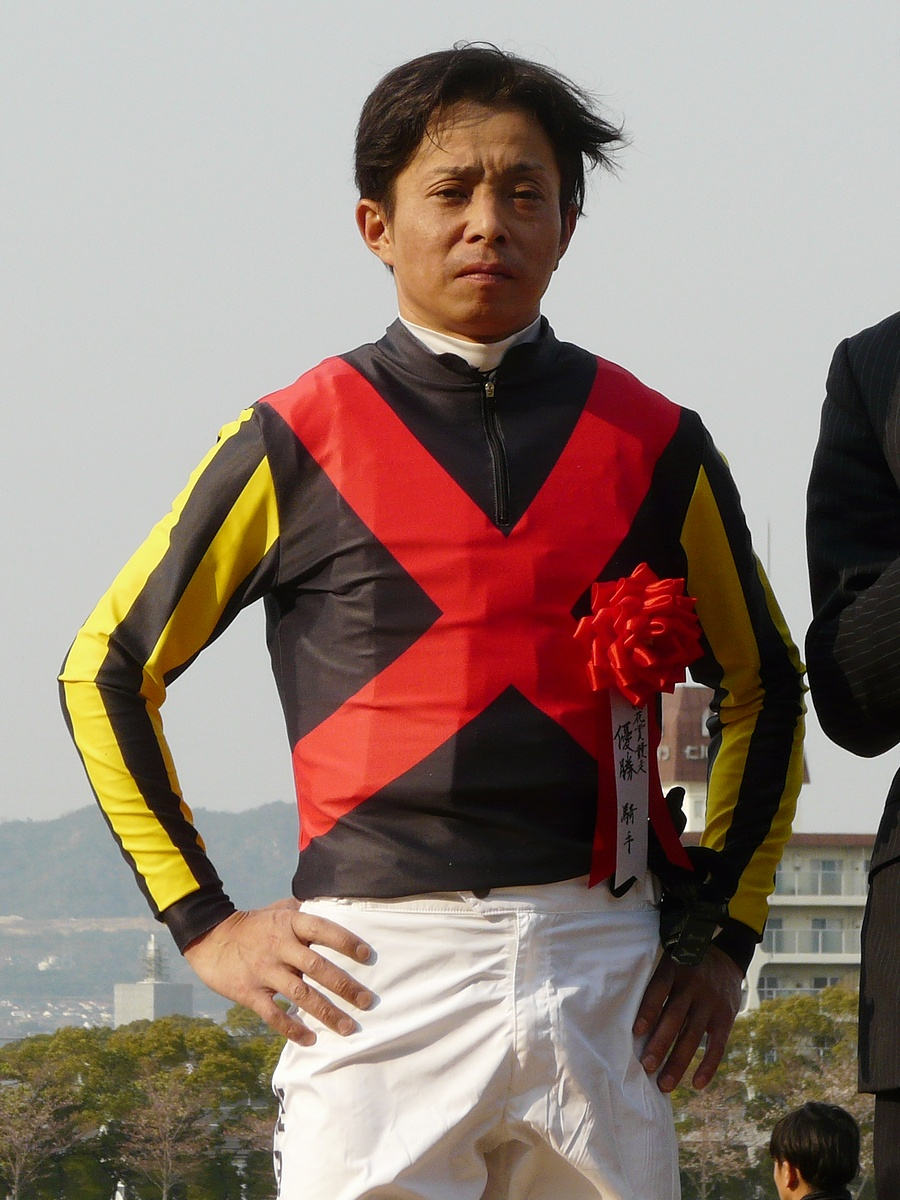
Yasunari Iwata, who rode Rainbow Line in his last six races

On 18 March 2018 Rainbow Line began his fourth campaign in the Hanshin Daishoten over 3000 metres. He started the 4.6/1 third choice in the betting behind Clincher (Kyoto Kinen) and Albert (Stayers Stakes) in an eleven-runner field which also included Satono Chronicle (Challenge Cup) and Curren Mirotic (Kinko Sho). After being restrained towards the rear as usual, Rainbow Line moved up on the outside on the final turn, hit the front approaching the last 200 metres and recorded his first win for more than two years as he came home a length and a quarter in front of Satono Chronicle with Clincher in third place.

At Kyoto six weeks later Rainbow Line made his second attempt to win the spring edition of the Tenno Sho and was made the 5/1 second favourite behind Cheval Grand. Clincher, Satono Chronicle, Albert and Curren Mirotic were again in opposition while the other eleven contenders included Ganko (Nikkei Sho), Chestnut Coat, Tosen Basil, Mikki Rocket (Nikkei Shinshun Hai) and Smart Layer (Hanshin Himba Stakes). The outsider Yamakatsu Raiden set the early pace with Rainbow Line settled well back in the field. Cheval Grand gained the advantage in the straight but Rainbow Line threaded his way through field after being switched to the inside by Iwata, caught the favourite in the final strides and won by a neck. Immediately after the race the horse was found to be lame, having sustained an injury to his right foreleg and was taken receive treatment at a veterinary facility rather than taking part in the victory ceremony. Iwata said "While our rivals were making early moves in the backstretch, my mount waited patiently, and I knew he had the needed late kick to reach the front before the wire. I'm worried about the horse. I just hope he’ll be able to run in the next race" while Hidekazu Asami commented "It's great that he was able to win but I'm concerned about his condition. I hope to give him the best care as possible".

Rainbow Line was unable to return to the track following his injury and was retired from racing on June 6.

In the 2018 World's Best Racehorse Rankings, Rainbow Line was again given a rating of 118, making him 78th best horse in the world.

== Racing form ==
Rainbow Line won five races and finished on podium for seven more times out of 22 starts. This data is available based on JBIS and netkeiba.

Date	Track	Race	Grade	Distance (Condition)	Entry	HN	Odds (Favored)	Finish	Time	Margins	Jockey	Winner (Runner-up)
2015 – two-year-old season
Aug 2	Sapporo	2yo Newcomer		1,800 m (Firm)	7	7	4.9 (2)	2nd	1:52.6	0.3	Hirofumi Shii	Prophet
Aug 15	Sapporo	2yo Maiden		1,800 m (Firm)	14	11	3.6 (2)	2nd	1:50.5	0.4	Hirofumi Shii	Love Leo
Aug 30	Sapporo	2yo Maiden		1,800 m (Firm)	9	8	1.9 (1)	1st	1:49.5	–0.4	Hirofumi Shii	(Tizona)
Oct 31	Kyoto	Hagi Stakes	OP	1,800 m (Firm)	5	5	10.3 (4)	3rd	1:47.8	0.2	Yasunari Iwata	Black Spinel
Nov 23	Tokyo	Tokyo Sports Hai Nisai Stakes	3	1,800 m (Firm)	11	8	37.2 (8)	9th	1:50.1	0.6	Masayoshi Ebina	Smart Odin
Dec 27	Hanshin	Senryo Sho	ALW (1W)	1,600 m (Firm)	10	1	4.0 (4)	1st	1:35.8	0.0	Hideaki Miyuki	(Sunrise Couronne)
2016 – three-year-old season
Jan 10	Kyoto	Shinzan Kinen	3	1,600 m (Firm)	18	5	18.3 (7)	6th	1:34.5	0.4	Hideaki Miyuki	Logi Cry
Feb 27	Hanshin	Arlington Cup	3	1,600 m (Firm)	14	6	6.8 (4)	1st	1:34.1	0.0	Mirco Demuro	(Dantsu Prius)
Apr 9	Nakayama	New Zealand Trophy	2	1,600 m (Firm)	16	2	7.2 (4)	5th	1:34.0	0.1	Hiroyuki Uchida	Dantsu Prius
May 8	Tokyo	NHK Mile Cup	1	1,600 m (Firm)	18	18	40.7 (12)	3rd	1:32.9	0.1	Yuichi Fukunaga	Major Emblem
May 29	Tokyo	Tokyo Yushun	1	2,400 m (Firm)	18	4	155.4 (12)	8th	2:24.7	0.7	Yuichi Fukunaga	Makahiki
Aug 21	Sapporo	Sapporo Kinen	2	2,000 m (Good)	16	2	12.3 (4)	3rd	2:02.1	0.4	Yuichi Fukunaga	Neorealism
Oct 23	Kyoto	Kikuka Sho	1	3,000 m (Firm)	18	11	24.9 (9)	2nd	3:03.7	0.4	Yuichi Fukunaga	Satono Diamond
Nov 27	Tokyo	Japan Cup	1	2,400 m (Firm)	17	14	18.7 (8)	6th	2:26.4	0.6	Christophe Lemaire	Kitasan Black
2017 – four-year-old season
Mar 25	Nakayama	Nikkei Sho	2	2,500 m (Firm)	16	9	5.1 (2)	4th	2:33.1	0.3	Mirco Demuro	Sciacchetra
Apr 30	Kyoto	Tenno Sho (Spring)	1	3,200 m (Firm)	17	16	23.2 (7)	12th	3:14.3	1.8	Mirco Demuro	Kitasan Black
Jun 25	Hanshin	Takarazuka Kinen	1	2,200 m (Good)	11	7	23.8 (7)	5th	2:12.3	0.9	Yasunari Iwata	Satono Crown
Oct 29	Tokyo	Tenno Sho (Autumn)	1	2,000 m (Heavy)	18	8	59.6 (13)	3rd	2:08.7	0.4	Yasunari Iwata	Kitasan Black
Nov 26	Tokyo	Japan Cup	1	2,400 m (Firm)	17	9	57.7 (8)	6th	2:24.7	1.0	Yasunari Iwata	Cheval Grand
Dec 24	Nakayama	Arima Kinen	1	2,500 m (Firm)	16	8	44.7 (9)	8th	2:34.3	0.7	Yasunari Iwata	Kitasan Black
2018 – five-year-old season
Mar 18	Hanshin	Hanshin Daishoten	2	3,000 m (Firm)	11	7	5.6 (3)	1st	3:03.6	–0.2	Yasunari Iwata	(Satono Chronicle)
Apr 29	Kyoto	Tenno Sho (Spring)	1	3,200 m (Firm)	17	12	6.0 (2)	1st	3:16.2	0.0	Yasunari Iwata	(Cheval Grand)

Legend:
Turf

== Stud record ==
Rainbow Line began his stud career at the Yushun Stallion Station in 2019. He retired from stud duty in 2022 and is now residing in the Northern Horse Park.

== Pedigree ==
Pedigree of Rainbow Line (JPN), bay horse, 2013
Sire Stay Gold (JPN) 1994	Sunday Silence (USA); 1986	Halo	Hail To Reason
Sire Stay Gold (JPN) 1994	Sunday Silence (USA); 1986	Halo	Cosmah
Sire Stay Gold (JPN) 1994	Sunday Silence (USA); 1986	Wishing Well	Understanding
Sire Stay Gold (JPN) 1994	Sunday Silence (USA); 1986	Wishing Well	Mountain Flower
Sire Stay Gold (JPN) 1994	Golden Sash (JPN); 1988	Dictus (FR)	Sanctus
Sire Stay Gold (JPN) 1994	Golden Sash (JPN); 1988	Dictus (FR)	Doronic
Sire Stay Gold (JPN) 1994	Golden Sash (JPN); 1988	Dyna Sash	Northern Taste (CAN)
Sire Stay Gold (JPN) 1994	Golden Sash (JPN); 1988	Dyna Sash	Royal Sash (GB)
Dam Regenbogen (JPN) 2002	French Deputy (JPN); 1992	Deputy Minister (CAN)	Vice Regent
Dam Regenbogen (JPN) 2002	French Deputy (JPN); 1992	Deputy Minister (CAN)	Mint Copy
Dam Regenbogen (JPN) 2002	French Deputy (JPN); 1992	Mitterand	Hold Your Peace
Dam Regenbogen (JPN) 2002	French Deputy (JPN); 1992	Mitterand	Laredo Lass
Dam Regenbogen (JPN) 2002	Rainbow Fast (JPN); 1992	Rainbow Amber	Amber Shadai
Dam Regenbogen (JPN) 2002	Rainbow Fast (JPN); 1992	Rainbow Amber	Eden Blues
Dam Regenbogen (JPN) 2002	Rainbow Fast (JPN); 1992	Rainbow Rose	First Family (USA)
Dam Regenbogen (JPN) 2002	Rainbow Fast (JPN); 1992	Rainbow Rose	Petite Amie (FR) (Family: 19)
