= Satono Diamond =

Japanese-bred Thoroughbred racehorse

Satono Diamond サトノダイヤモンド
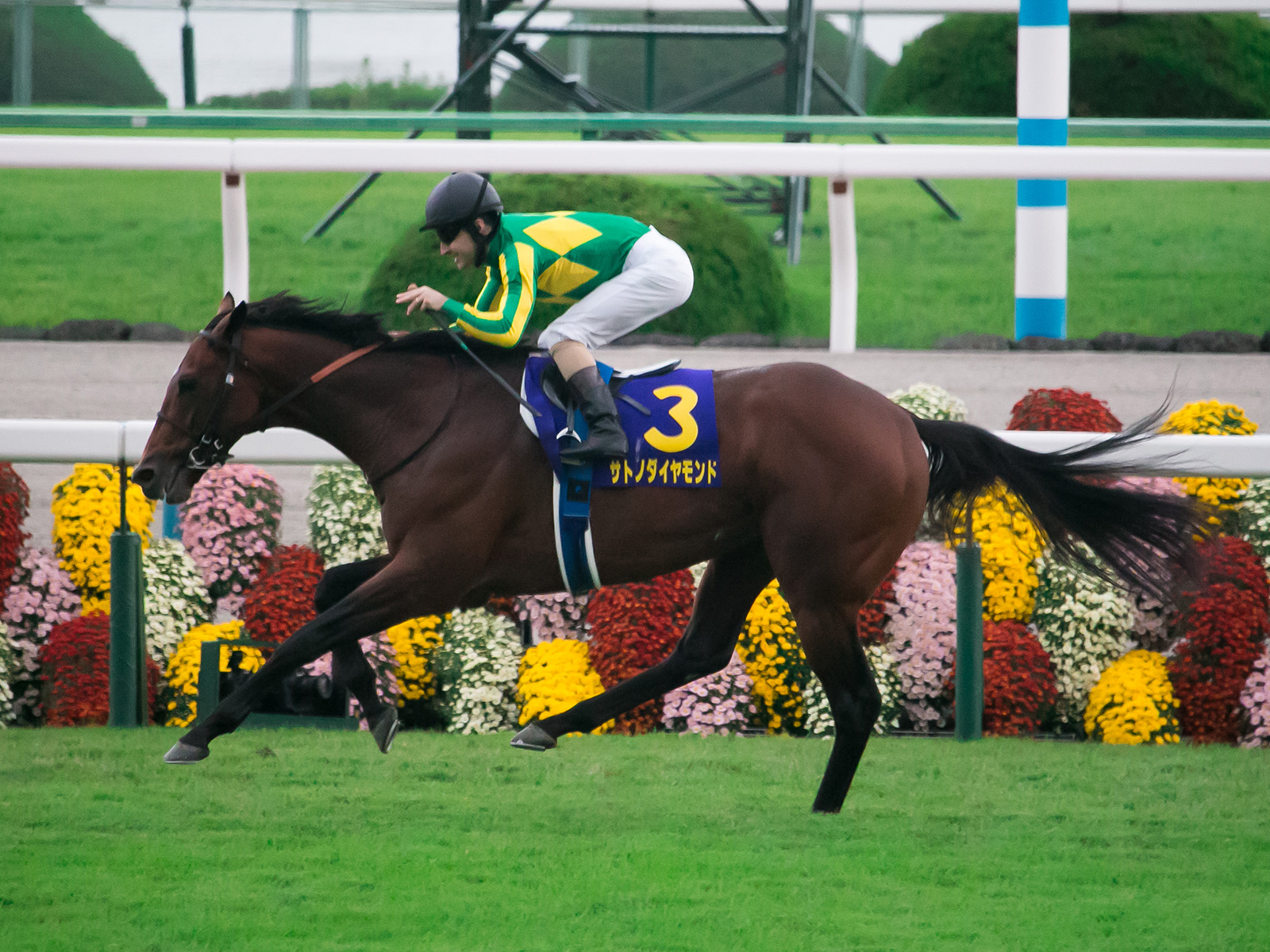
- Satono Diamond winning the Kikuka Shō in October 2016.
- Breed: Thoroughbred
- Sire: Deep Impact (JPN)
- Grandsire: Sunday Silence (USA)
- Dam: Malpensa (ARG)
- Damsire: Orpen (USA)
- Sex: Stallion
- Foaled: January 30, 2013 (age 13)
- Country: Japan
- Colour: Bay
- Breeder: Northern Farm
- Owner: Hajime Satomi
- Racing colours
- Trainer: Yasutoshi Ikee
- Jockey: Christophe Lemaire
- Record: 18: 8-1-3
- Earnings: ¥865,124,000

Major wins
- Kisaragi Sho (2016); Kobe Shimbun Hai (2016); Arima Kinen (2016); Hanshin Daishoten (2017); Kyoto Daishoten (2018); Japanese Classic Race wins: Kikuka Sho (2016)

Awards
- JRA Award for Best Three-Year-Old Colt (2016)

Satono Diamond (Japanese: サトノダイヤモンド, Hepburn: Satono Daiyamondo; foaled 30 January 2013) is a Japanese Thoroughbred racehorse and sire. He showed promise as a juvenile in 2015 when he won both of his races. In the following year he developed into a top-class performer winning the Kisaragi Sho, finishing third in the Satsuki Sho, and taking second place in the Tokyo Yushun. In the autumn he was unbeaten in three starts, winning the Kobe Shimbun Hai, Kikuka Sho, and Arima Kinen, and took the JRA Award for Best Three-Year-Old Colt.

== Background ==
Satono Diamond is a bay horse with a diamond-shaped white star bred in Japan by Northern Farm. In 2013 he was consigned as a foal to the JRHA Select sale and was bought for ¥241,500,000 ($2,272,400) by Hajime Satomi. Satomi, whose horses usually carry the "Satono" prefix, sent the colt into training with Yasutoshi Ikee. In all of his races in to the end of 2016 Satono Diamond was ridden by the French jockey Christophe Lemaire.

He is from the sixth crop of foals sired by Deep Impact, who was the Japanese Horse of the Year in 2005 and 2006, winning races including the Tokyo Yushun, Tenno Sho, Arima Kinen and Japan Cup. Deep Impact's other progeny include Gentildonna, Harp Star, Kizuna, A Shin Hikari and Makahiki. Satono Diamond is the first foal produced by Malpensa, a mare who won three Grade I races in her native Argentina. She was descended from Royal Arch, an Irish mare who was exported to Argentina in the early 1930s.

== Racing career ==
=== 2015: Two-year-old season ===
Satono Diamond made his debut in a 2000 meter race for previously unraced juveniles at Kyoto Racecourse on November 8th, and won by two lengths from Leukerbad. Racing over the same distance at Hanshin Racecourse on December 26th, the colt followed up in a minor event winning by three lengths from Queen's Best.

=== 2016: Three-year-old season ===
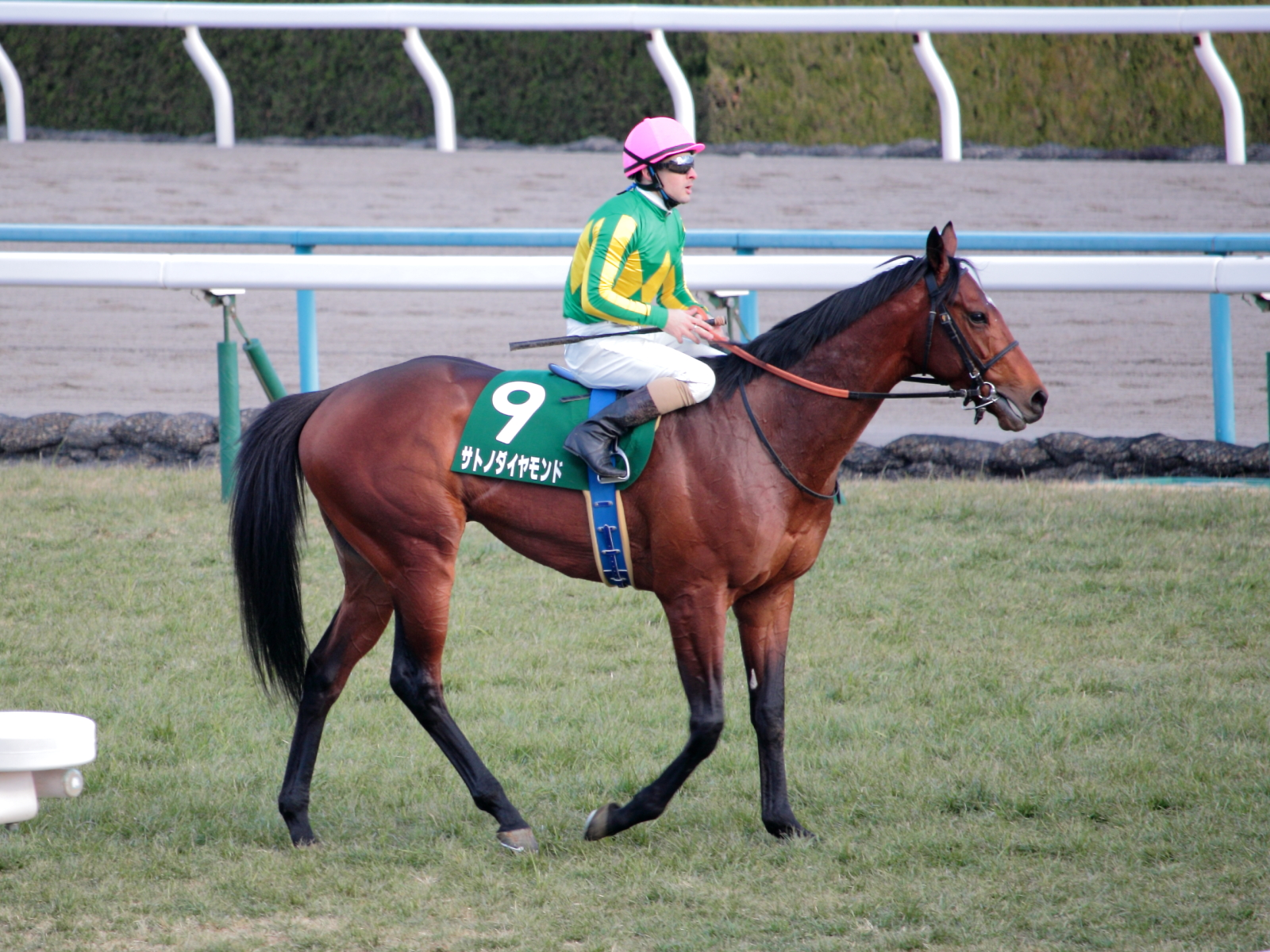
Satono Diamond at Kyoto in February 2016

The colt began his 2016 campaign in the Grade 3 Kisaragi Sho (a 1800 meter trial race for the Satsuki Sho) on February 7th at Kyoto. He started as the 1/5 favourite against eight opponents, and won by three and a half lengths plus a head from Les Planches and Leukerbad. In the Satsuki Sho (a race over 2000 metres at Nakayama Racecourse) on April 17th, Satono Diamond was made the 1.7/1 favourite ahead of the Japanese champion two-year-old colt Leontes in an eighteen-runner field. Before the race, Ikee commented on the colt's physical progress and added, "He's very stable mentally and he can handle any kind of race." After racing in the midfield, Diamond made a forward move in the straight, but was slightly hampered in the closing stages and finished third behind Dee Majesty and Makahiki. Ikee later said that the tactics employed had been "a mistake", commenting, "This colt is big and has long limbs and he's not able to take small steps." On the 83rd running of the Tokyo Yushun, in front of a crowd of 140,000 at Tokyo Racecourse, Satono Diamond was one of eighteen colts in contention, and started second favourite behind Dee Majesty. In the race, he was positioned several lengths behind the early leaders before moving up to dispute the lead in the straight. But in a very close finish, he was beaten by a nose by Makahiki, with Dee Majesty half a length away in third place.

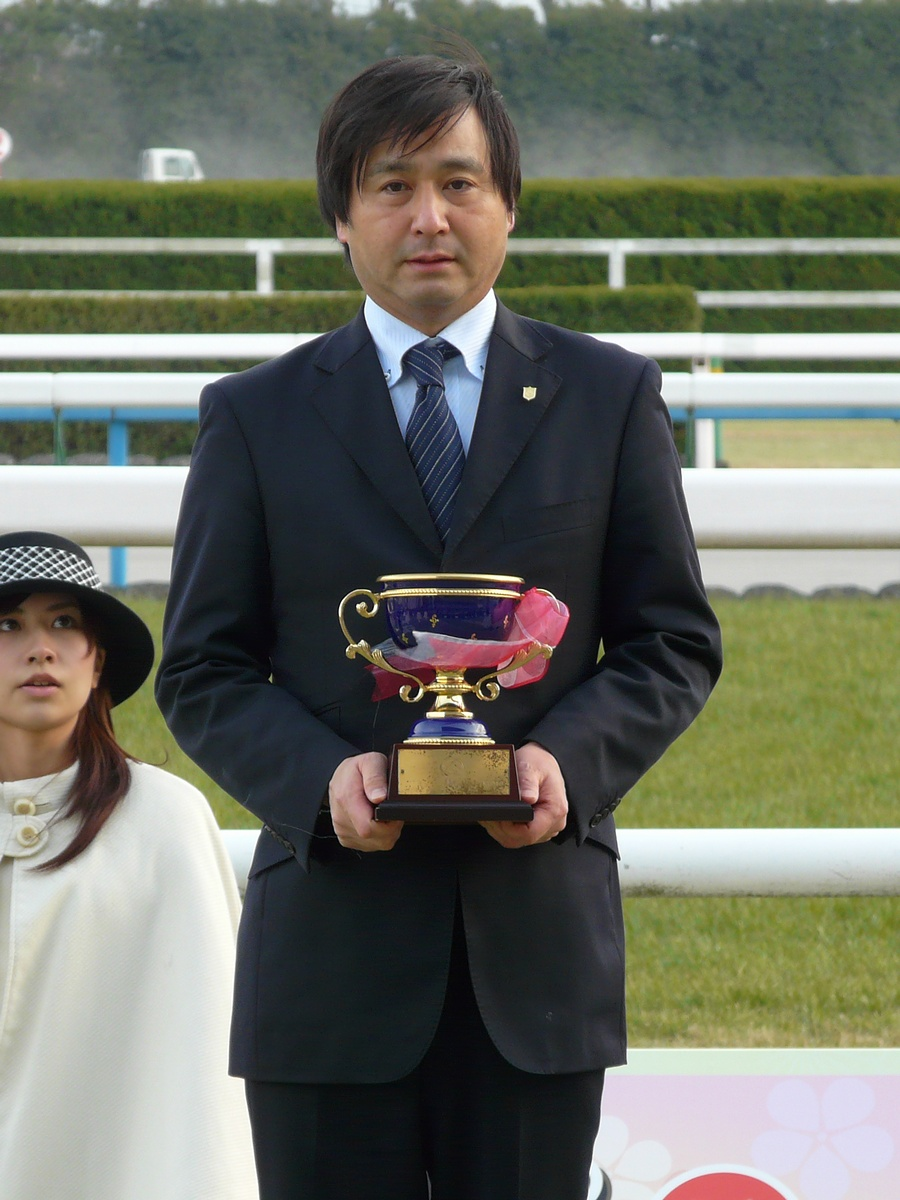
Satono Diamond's trainer Yasutoshi Ikee

After a break of almost four months, Satono Diamond returned to the track in the Kobe Shimbun Hai (a major trial race of 2400 meters for the Kikuka Sho), at Hanshin on September 25th. He was the 1/5 favourite in a fifteen-runner field, and won by a neck from the 26/1 outsider Mikki Rocket. Ikee commented, "That was his first outing in a while and he was a bit keen and also didn't show his best in the finish either. Still, he won, so that's the important thing." At the 77th running of the Kikuka Sho, Satono Diamond started as the 1.3/1 favourite in an eighteen-runner field which included Dee Majesty, Mikki Rocket and Air Spinel. After racing in the midfield, he moved up on the outside when entering the straight, took the lead 200 metres from the finish, and quickened to win the race by two and a half lengths from the outsider Rainbow Line. After the race Lemaire said, "I'm excited and happy to be able to win a classic race for the first time in Japan. The colt was in his best condition and the only concern was the distance. But he responded really well in the last stretch so I was quite confident that we will win. He's a top-class horse and will definitely be able to win other G1 races."

On December 25th, Satono Diamond was matched against older opposition when he was one of sixteen horses invited to contest the Arima Kinen (a 2500 meter race) at Nakayama. He was made the 2.6/1 favourite ahead of the four-year-old Kitasan Black and the 2015 winner Gold Actor. The other runners included Sounds of Earth (who placed second in 2015), Cheval Grand (Hanshin Daishoten, Copa Republica Argentina), Marialite (Queen Elizabeth II Cup, Takarazuka Kinen) and Mikki Queen (Yushun Himba, Shuka Sho). Satono Diamond raced in the midfield on the outside, as the Maltese Apogee set the pace from Kitasan Black. He moved up when entering the straight before producing a late burst of acceleration to overtake Kitasan Black well inside the last 100 meters, winning by a neck with Gold Actor half a length away in third place. Lemaire said, "He is such an easy ride. He makes my job so easy. He was a little slow to react on the last turn. But he was so strong in front of goal. He has such a big heart." Whilst Ikee commented, "It's a huge relief. He’ll be able to take it up a notch or two next season. He should really come into his own by the fall. He just beat the best horses in all of Japan as a 3-year-old, which is great and gives us something to look forward to next year."

=== 2017: Four-year-old season ===
Satono Diamond began his 2017 campaign in the Grade 2 Hanshin Daishoten (over 3000 meters) on March 19th. He started at long odds-on with the only of his nine opponents to start at less than 28/1, these being Cheval Grand and the 2014 Tokyo Yushun winner One And Only. He won by one and a half lengths from Cheval Grand with the outsider Tosen Basil taking third place. On April 30, the colt faced a rematch with Kitasan Black in the spring edition of the Tenno Sho (over 3200 meters) at Kyoto, and started 1.5/1 second favourite behind his older rival. He finished third of the seventeen runners, beaten by one and a quarter lengths plus a neck by Kitasan Black and Cheval Grand.

In August, Satono Diamond was sent to France to be prepared for a challenge for the Prix de l'Arc de Triomphe. On his European debut he started second favourite for the September 10th Prix Foy (over 2400 meters) on soft ground at Chantilly Racecourse. After briefly taking the lead 300 meters out, he faded to finish fifth behind the German challenger Dschingis Secret. In the Prix de l'Arc de Triomphe three weeks later, he made no impact and came home fifteenth of the eighteen runners behind Enable.

=== 2018: Five-year-old season ===
On his first run as a five-year-old, Satono Diamond finished third to Suave Richard in the Kinko Sho at Chukyo Racecourse on March 11th. Three weeks later, he started third favorite in the betting for the Grade 1 Osaka Hai at Hanshin. However, he was "never a threat" and came home seventh behind Suave Richard, six and a quarter lengths behind the winner. On June 24th at the same track, he was made favourite for the Grade 1 Takarazuka Kinen (over 2200 meters). He fought for the lead with the eventual winner Mikki Rocket early in the straight, but then faded in the closing stages to finish sixth.

After the summer break Satono Diamond returned on October 8th when he was the 1.3/1 second favorite behind Cheval Grand in the Grade 2 Kyoto Daishoten (over 2400 meters). Ridden by Yuga Kawada, he settled in the midfield before overtaking the front-running Win Tenderness early in the straight, and held off the late run by the filly Red Genova to win by half a length. Diamond returned to the highest class for his next race, and finished sixth behind Almond Eye in the Japan Cup at Tokyo on November 24th. Satono Diamond ended his season on December 23rd, with an attempt to repeat his 2016 success at the Arima Kinen, but came home sixth of the sixteen runners behind Blast Onepiece.

== Stud Career ==
Satono Diamond was retired from racing at the end of the 2018 season and began his career as a breeding stallion at the Shadai Stallion Station. His most successful crop is Satono Glanz, who won the Kyoto Shimbun Hai and Kobe Shimbun Hai in 2023, setting a course record for the latter.

=== Notable progeny ===
c = colt, f = filly, g = gelding

Foaled	Name	Sex	Major Wins
2020	Rohdiamant	g	Kyoto Jump Stakes, Niigata Jump Stakes
2020	Satono Glanz	c	Kyoto Shimbun Hai, Kobe Shimbun Hai
2020	Shinryokuka	f	Niigata Kinen
2020	Suzu Khalom	c	Lord Derby Challenge Trophy
2021	Allnatt	c	Challenge Cup
2022	Piko Rose	f	Keisei Hai Autumn Handicap

== Assessment and awards ==
In the 2016 JRA Awards, Satono Diamond was named Best Three-Year-Old Colt as he took 286 of the 291 votes. In the poll to determine the Japanese Horse of the Year, he finished third in the voting behind Kitasan Black and Maurice. In the 2016 edition of the World's Best Racehorse Rankings he was given a rating of 123, making him the 12th best racehorse in the world, and the third-best three-year-old colt behind Arrogate and Almanzor.

== In popular culture ==
An anthropomorphized version of Satono Diamond appears as a character in the multimedia franchise Umamusume: Pretty Derby, voiced by Hina Tachibana. She is depicted as the childhood friend and rival of Kitasan Black who enrolls in Tracen Academy to follow in the footsteps of her idol, Mejiro McQueen. As a young lady of the wealthy Satono family household, she aspires to break her family's jinx of never winning a G1 race by becoming an acclaimed racer herself. She initially made an appearance in the second season of the anime series, before becoming a major character in the third season.

== Racing form ==
Satono Diamond won eight races out of 18 starts. This data is available based on JBIS, netkeiba and racingpost.

Date	Age	Track	Race	Grade	Distance (Condition)	Entry	HN	Odds (Favored)	Finish	Time	Margins	Jockey	Winner (Runner-up)
Nov 8, 2015	2	Kyoto	2yo Newcomer		2,000 m (Soft)	10	6	1.6 (1)	1st	2:03.8	–0.4	Christophe Lemaire	(Leukerbad)
Dec 26, 2015	2	Hanshin	2yo Allowance	1W	2,000 m (Good)	15	11	1.2 (1)	1st	2:03.8	–0.6	Christophe Lemaire	(Queen's Best)
Feb 7, 2016	3	Kyoto	Kisaragi Sho	3	1,800 m (Firm)	9	9	1.2 (1)	1st	1:46.9	–0.6	Christophe Lemaire	(Les Planches)
Apr 17, 2016	3	Nakayama	Satsuki Sho	1	2,000 m (Firm)	18	11	2.7 (1)	3rd	1:58.3	0.4	Christophe Lemaire	Dee Majesty
May 29, 2016	3	Tokyo	Tokyo Yushun	1	2,400 m (Firm)	18	8	3.8 (2)	2nd	2:24.0	0.0	Christophe Lemaire	Makahiki
Sep 25, 2016	3	Hanshin	Kobe Shimbun Hai	2	2,400 m (Firm)	15	14	1.2 (1)	1st	2:25.7	0.0	Christophe Lemaire	(Mikki Rocket)
Oct 23, 2016	3	Kyoto	Kikuka Sho	1	3,000 m (Firm)	18	3	2.3 (1)	1st	3:03.3	–0.4	Christophe Lemaire	(Rainbow Line)
Dec 25, 2016	3	Nakayama	Arima Kinen	1	2,500 m (Firm)	16	11	2.6 (1)	1st	2:32.6	0.0	Christophe Lemaire	(Kitasan Black)
Mar 19, 2017	4	Hanshin	Hanshin Daishoten	2	3,000 m (Firm)	10	9	1.1 (1)	1st	3:02.6	–0.2	Christophe Lemaire	(Cheval Grand)
Apr 30, 2017	4	Kyoto	Tenno Sho (Spring)	1	3,200 m (Firm)	17	15	2.5 (2)	3rd	3:12.7	–0.2	Christophe Lemaire	Kitasan Black
Sep 10, 2017	4	Chantilly	Prix Foy	2	2,400 m (Soft)	6	5	19/10 (2)	4th	2:36.4	0.5	Christophe Lemaire	Dschingis Secret
Oct 1, 2017	4	Chantilly	Prix de l'Arc de Triomphe	1	2,400 m (Soft)	18	9	40/1 (11)	15th	2:29.9	1.2	Christophe Lemaire	Enable
Mar 11, 2018	5	Chukyo	Kinko Sho	2	2,000 m (Good)	9	5	3.3 (2)	3rd	2:01.9	0.3	Christophe Lemaire	Suave Richard
Apr 1, 2018	5	Hanshin	Osaka Hai	1	2,000 m (Firm)	16	2	4.0 (3)	7th	1:59.2	1.0	Keita Tosaki	Suave Richard
Jun 24, 2018	5	Hanshin	Takarazuka Kinen	1	2,200 m (Good)	16	3	3.9 (1)	6th	2:12.4	0.8	Christophe Lemaire	Mikki Rocket
Oct 8, 2018	5	Kyoto	Kyoto Daishoten	2	2,400 m (Firm)	11	2	2.3 (2)	1st	2:25.4	–0.1	Yuga Kawada	(Red Genova)
Nov 25, 2018	5	Tokyo	Japan Cup	1	2,400 m (Firm)	14	3	7.1 (3)	6th	2:21.9	1.3	Joao Moreira	Almond Eye
Dec 23, 2018	5	Nakayama	Arima Kinen	1	2,500 m (Good)	16	6	18.1 (6)	6th	2:32.8	0.6	Brenton Avdulla	Blast Onepiece

Legend:
Turf

== Pedigree ==
Pedigree of Satono Diamond (JPN), bay colt 2013
Sire Deep Impact (JPN) 2002	Sunday Silence (USA); 1986	Halo	Hail to Reason
Sire Deep Impact (JPN) 2002	Sunday Silence (USA); 1986	Halo	Cosmah
Sire Deep Impact (JPN) 2002	Sunday Silence (USA); 1986	Wishing Well	Understanding
Sire Deep Impact (JPN) 2002	Sunday Silence (USA); 1986	Wishing Well	Mountain Flower
Sire Deep Impact (JPN) 2002	Wind in Her Hair (IRE); 1991	Alzao	Lyphard
Sire Deep Impact (JPN) 2002	Wind in Her Hair (IRE); 1991	Alzao	Lady Rebecca
Sire Deep Impact (JPN) 2002	Wind in Her Hair (IRE); 1991	Burghclere	Busted
Sire Deep Impact (JPN) 2002	Wind in Her Hair (IRE); 1991	Burghclere	Highclere
Dam Malpensa (ARG) 2006	Orpen (USA); 1996	Lure	Danzig
Dam Malpensa (ARG) 2006	Orpen (USA); 1996	Lure	Endear
Dam Malpensa (ARG) 2006	Orpen (USA); 1996	Bonita Francita	Devil's Bag
Dam Malpensa (ARG) 2006	Orpen (USA); 1996	Bonita Francita	Raise the Standard
Dam Malpensa (ARG) 2006	Marsella (ARG); 1997	Southern Halo	Halo
Dam Malpensa (ARG) 2006	Marsella (ARG); 1997	Southern Halo	Northern Sea
Dam Malpensa (ARG) 2006	Marsella (ARG); 1997	Riviere	Logical
Dam Malpensa (ARG) 2006	Marsella (ARG); 1997	Riviere	Talonado (Family: 1-w)
