= Cheval Grand =

Japanese thoroughbred racehorse

Cheval Grand シュヴァルグラン
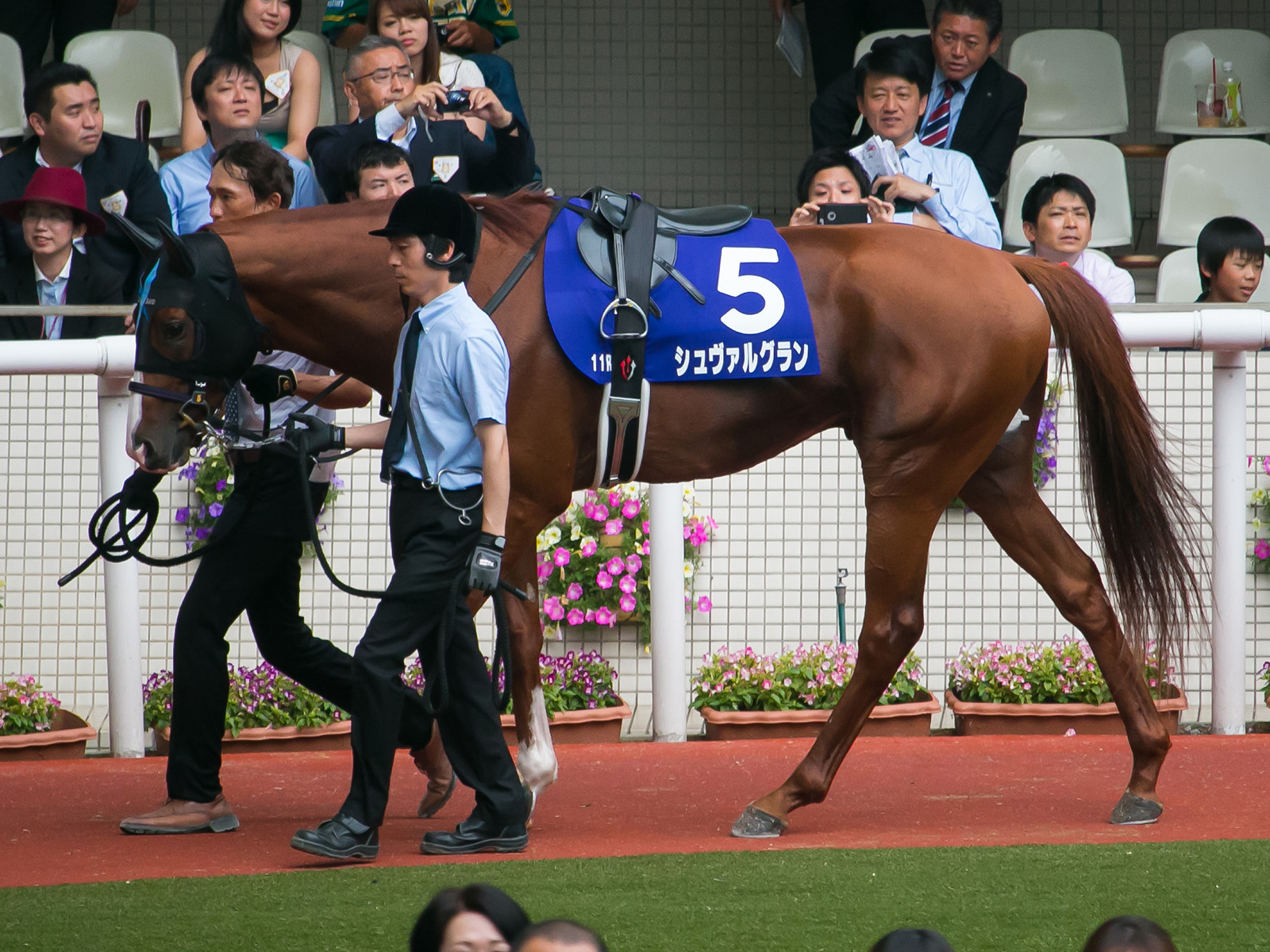
- Cheval Grand at the paddock of the 2017 Takarazuka Kinen.
- Breed: Thoroughbred
- Sire: Heart's Cry
- Grandsire: Sunday Silence
- Dam: Halwa Sweet
- Damsire: Machiavellian
- Sex: Stallion
- Foaled: March 14, 2012 (age 14)
- Country: Japan
- Color: Chestnut
- Breeder: Northern Farm
- Owner: Kazuhiro Sasaki
- Racing colors
- Trainer: Yasuo Tomomichi
- Jockey: Yuichi Fukunaga; Hugh Bowman
- Record: 33: 7–7–7
- Earnings: $10,190,341

Major wins
- Hanshin Daishōten (2016); Copa Republica Argentina (2016); Japan Cup (2017)

Cheval Grand (Japanese: シュヴァルグラン, Hepburn: Shuvaru Guran; foaled March 14, 2012) is a Japanese Thoroughbred racehorse who won the 2016 Copa Republica Argentina, the 2016 Hanshin Daishoten, and the 2017 Japan Cup. Cheval Grand has earned a total of $10,190,341, averaging $308,798 per start.

== Background ==
Cheval Grand was foaled on March 14, 2012, at Northern Farm in Abira, Hokkaido. His dam, Halwa Sweet, is also the dam of Verxina and Vivlos, also owned by Kazuhiro Sasaki and trained by Yasuo Tomomichi. Both Verxina and Vivlos had successful careers, with his older sister Verxina winning the Victoria Mile and younger sister Vivlos winning the Shuka Sho and Dubai Turf.

== Racing career ==
Cheval Grand's first race was on September 21, 2014, where he finished in 2nd place by a neck behind the favorite. On October 3, 2015, in the Special Weight category, he won his first race at Hanshin Racecourse as the favorite. In his last two races of the 2015 season, he finished third including one GIII race where he was the favorite.

2015 was Cheval Grand's three year old season where he entered six races and came out with three wins. He was registered to enter the Wakakoma Stakes, an OP race, in January of that year but was forced to drop out due to an injury. With the goal of running in the Japanese Derby, he entered the GIII 1800m Mainichi Hai in late March followed by the 2200m GII Kyoto Shimbun Hai, where he came in 5th and 8th respectively. Because of these losses, he was not able to enter the classic races and had to find a new path for his three year old season. He entered 3 more minor races that year over 2000m to 2400m, winning as the favorite in all three.

At the start of his four year old season, he entered graded races again, starting with the Nikkei New Year Cup, where he came in second. He raced again two months later in March, when he entered Hanshin Daishoten as the favorite, where he won his first ever victory in a graded race. He entered the Tenno Sho (spring) as his first GI race, but he came in third behind Kitasan Black. Cheval Grand's next GI race was a month later at the Takarazuka Kinen but lost, coming in ninth place. On November 6, 2016, Cheval Grand won the GII Copa Republica Argentina, starting strong for the autumn of the 2016 season. He stayed in graded races for the remaining two races for the year, but fell short of a GI victory. He came in third at the Japan Cup and sixth at the Arima Kinen.

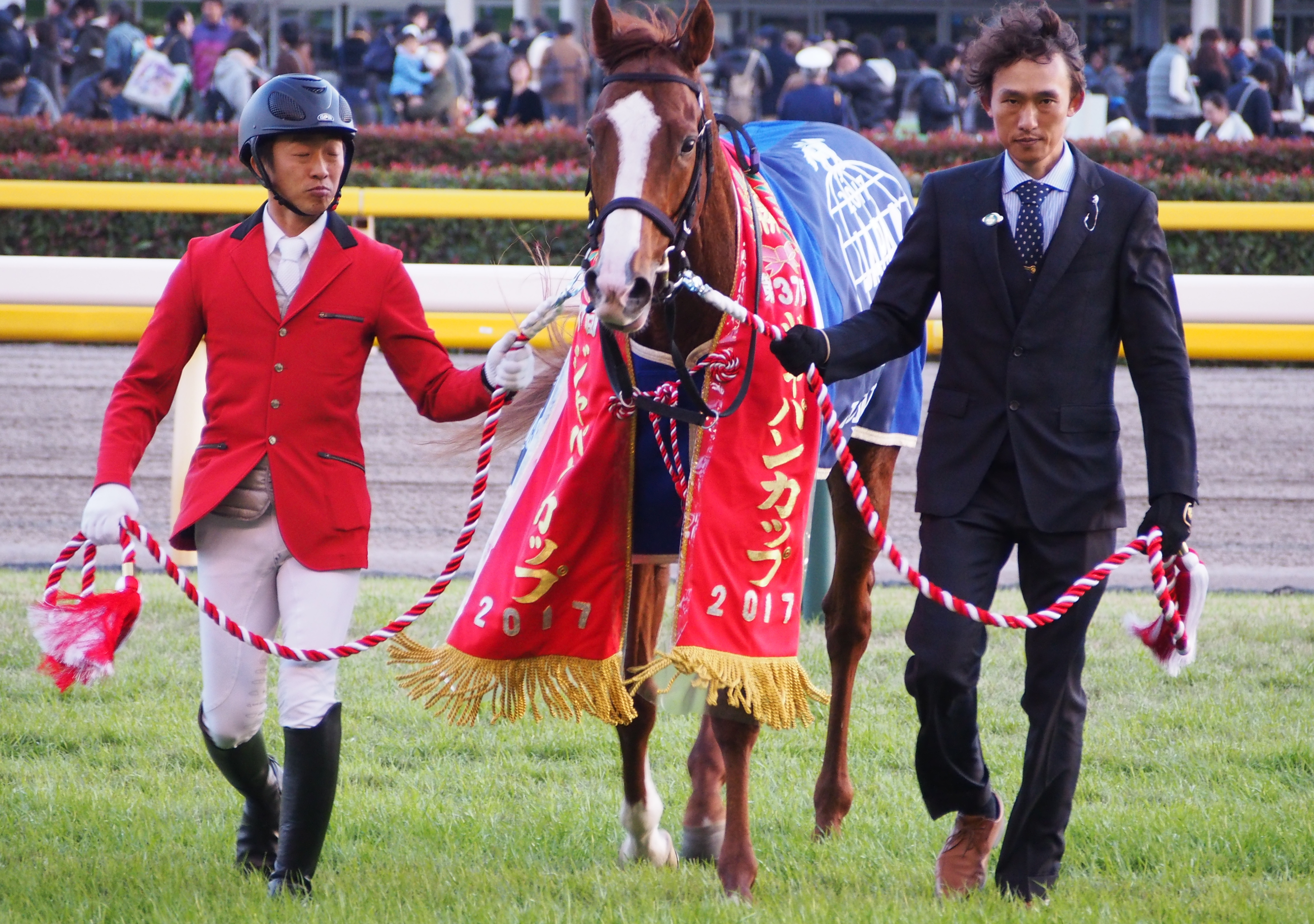
Cheval Grand, victorious at the Japan Cup

Cheval Grand's five year old season, in 2017, started with the Hanshin Daishoten. He started strong but was overtaken by Satono Diamond for a second place finish. He once again enter the Tenno Sho (sping) after that but came in second behind Kitasan Black. Again, he entered the Takarazuka Kinen, but mismanaged his stamina and finished in eighth. With a new jockey on his back, Cheval Grand entered the GII Kyoto Daishoten, coming in third place. Cheval Grand earned his first and only GI victory on November 26, 2017, as he won the Japan Cup. His final race of the year was the Arima Kinen, where he finished third, an improvement from his previous sixth place the year prior.

On April 29, 2018, Cheval came in 2nd place at the Spring Tenno Sho behind Rainbow Line.

On March 30, 2019, Cheval came in 2nd place behind Old Persian at the Dubai Sheema Classic. Cheval went on to race in 2 British races, the King George VI and Queen Elizabeth Stakes and the International Stakes, that year, neither of which were successful. Cheval Grand retired after returning to Japan and racing in both the Japan Cup and the Arima Kinen, the latter in which he finished in 6th place behind Lys Gracieux but passing Almond Eye.

== Retirement ==
After retiring from racing, Cheval Grand was a stud at the Breeders Stallion Station. After not producing any notable offspring, he retired from his stud career in late 2025 and was moved to Northern Horse Park. On April 30, 2026, Cheval Grand debuted as a jumping horse in the "Thoroughbred Horse Show 2026 - The Second Career" at Laque Dragon Horse Park, Otsu, Shiga.

== In popular culture ==
An anthropomorphized version of Cheval Grand appears as a character in the Japanese multimedia franchise Umamusume: Pretty Derby, voiced by Yūko Natsuyoshi. She is depicted as the shy, introverted middle sister between Verxina and Vivlos with a deep-seated inferiority complex. She possesses a quiet determination to prove herself in order to resolve her feelings of inadequacy in comparison to her more talented sisters, who deeply care for her despite their differences. Like her real-life counterpart, she has a complex rivalry with Kitasan Black that is depicted in the third season of the anime series.

== Racing form ==
Cheval Grand won seven races out of 33 starts with another 14 podium finishes. This data available on JBIS, netkeiba, British Horesracing Authority and racingpost.

Date	Age	Race	Grade	Distance	Surface	Track	Entry	Finish	Time	Margin	Jockey	Winner (Runner-up)
Sep 21, 2014	2	2YO Debut		2000m	Turf	Hanshin	14	2nd	2:04.0	0.0	Yuichi Fukunaga	Dragon Verse
Oct 12, 2014	2	2YO Maiden		2000m	Turf	Kyoto	12	1st	2:00.8	–0.2	Yuichi Fukunaga	(Albert Dock)
Nov 29, 2014	2	Kyoto Nisai Stakes	3	2000m	Turf	Kyoto	8	3rd	2:04.9	0.1	Hiroyuki Uchida	Bell Lap
Dec 27, 2014	2	Erica Sho	ALW (1W)	2000m	Turf	Hanshin	12	3rd	2:02.7	0.3	Hiroyuki Uchida	Beruf
Jan 24, 2015	3	Wakagoma Stakes	OP	2000m	Turf	Kyoto	7	Scratched	–	–	Hiroyuki Uchida	Adam's Bridge
Mar 28, 2015	3	Mainichi Hai	3	1800m	Turf	Hanshin	15	5th	1:47.5	0.3	Hiroyuki Uchida	Musee Allen
May 9, 2015	3	Kyoto Shimbun Hai	2	2200m	Turf	Kyoto	16	8th	2:11.9	0.6	Hiroyuki Uchida	Satono Rasen
Aug 30, 2015	3	3YO+ Allowance	1W	2000m	Turf	Sapporo	16	2nd	2:00.1	0.4	Yuichi Fukunaga	Albert
Oct 3, 2015	3	3YO+ Allowance	1W	2400m	Turf	Hanshin	17	1st	2:28.3	–0.3	Yuichi Fukunaga	(Mikki Pouch)
Oct 31, 2015	3	3YO+ Allowance	2W	2400m	Turf	Kyoto	8	1st	2:24.8	–0.3	Yuichi Fukunaga	(A Shin Allonsy)
Dec 13, 2015	3	Orion Stakes	ALW (3W)	2400m	Turf	Hanshin	9	1st	2:28.1	–0.5	Christophe Lemaire	(Shiho)
Jan 17, 2016	4	Nikkei Shinshun Hai	2	2400m	Turf	Kyoto	12	2nd	2:26.2	0.3	Christophe Lemaire	Reve Mistral
Mar 20, 2016	4	Hanshin Daishoten	2	3000m	Turf	Hanshin	11	1st	3:05.8	–0.4	Yuichi Fukunaga	(Tanta Alegria)
May 1, 2016	4	Tenno Sho (Spring)	1	3200m	Turf	Kyoto	18	3rd	3:15.5	0.2	Yuichi Fukunaga	Kitasan Black
Jun 26, 2016	4	Takarazuka Kinen	1	2200m	Turf	Hanshin	17	9th	2:14.2	1.4	Yuichi Fukunaga	Marialite
Nov 6, 2016	4	Copa Republica Argentina	2	2500m	Turf	Tokyo	15	1st	2:33.4	–0.1	Yuichi Fukunaga	(Albert)
Nov 27, 2016	4	Japan Cup	1	2400m	Turf	Tokyo	17	3rd	2:26.3	0.5	Yuichi Fukunaga	Kitasan Black
Dec 25, 2016	4	Arima Kinen	1	2500m	Turf	Nakayama	16	6th	2:33.1	0.5	Yuichi Fukunaga	Satono Diamond
Mar 19, 2017	5	Hanshin Daishoten	2	3000m	Turf	Hanshin	10	2nd	3:02.8	0.2	Yuichi Fukunaga	Satono Diamond
Apr 30, 2017	5	Tenno Sho (Spring)	1	3200m	Turf	Kyoto	17	2nd	3:12.7	0.2	Yuichi Fukunaga	Kitasan Black
Jun 25, 2017	5	Takarazuka Kinen	1	2200m	Turf	Hanshin	11	8th	2:12.6	1.2	Yuichi Fukunaga	Satono Crown
Oct 9, 2017	5	Kyoto Daishoten	2	2400m	Turf	Kyoto	15	3rd	2:23.1	0.1	Mirco Demuro	Smart Layer
Nov 26, 2017	5	Japan Cup	1	2400m	Turf	Tokyo	17	1st	2:23.7	–0.2	Hugh Bowman	(Rey de Oro)
Dec 24, 2017	5	Arima Kinen	1	2500m	Turf	Nakayama	16	3rd	2:33.8	0.2	Hugh Bowman	Kitasan Black
Apr 1, 2018	6	Osaka Hai	1	2000m	Turf	Hanshin	16	13th	1:59.7	1.5	Kosei Miura	Suave Richard
Apr 29, 2018	6	Tenno Sho (Spring)	1	3200m	Turf	Kyoto	17	2nd	3:16.2	0.0	Hugh Bowman	Rainbow Line
Oct 8, 2018	6	Kyoto Daishoten	2	2400m	Turf	Kyoto	11	4th	2:26.0	0.6	Yuichi Fukunaga	Satono Diamond
Nov 25, 2018	6	Japan Cup	1	2400m	Turf	Tokyo	14	4th	2:21.5	0.9	Cristian Demuro	Almond Eye
Dec 23, 2018	6	Arima Kinen	1	2500m	Turf	Nakayama	16	3rd	2:32.4	0.2	Hugh Bowman	Blast Onepiece
Mar 30, 2019	7	Dubai Sheema Classic	1	2410m	Turf	Meydan	8	2nd	2:27.5	0.3	Hugh Bowman	Old Persian
Jul 27, 2019	7	King George VI and Queen Elizabeth Stakes	1	12f	Turf	Ascot	11	6th	2:34.8	2.4	Oisin Murphy	Enable
Aug 21, 2019	7	Juddmonte International	1	10.3f	Turf	York	9	8th	2:08.7	0.9	Oisin Murphy	Japan
Nov 24, 2019	7	Japan Cup	1	2400m	Turf	Tokyo	15	9th	2:27.1	1.2	Christophe Soumillon	Suave Richard
Dec 22, 2019	7	Arima Kinen	1	2500m	Turf	Nakayama	16	6th	2:31.9	1.4	Yuichi Fukunaga	Lys Gracieux

== Pedigree ==
Pedigree of Cheval Grand (JPN), Chestnut, 2012
Sire Heart's Cry (JPN) 2001	Sunday Silence (USA); 1986	Halo	Hail to Reason
Sire Heart's Cry (JPN) 2001	Sunday Silence (USA); 1986	Halo	Cosmah
Sire Heart's Cry (JPN) 2001	Sunday Silence (USA); 1986	Wishing Well	Understanding
Sire Heart's Cry (JPN) 2001	Sunday Silence (USA); 1986	Wishing Well	Mountain Flower
Sire Heart's Cry (JPN) 2001	Irish Dance (USA); 1990	Tony Bin	Kampala
Sire Heart's Cry (JPN) 2001	Irish Dance (USA); 1990	Tony Bin	Severn Bridge
Sire Heart's Cry (JPN) 2001	Irish Dance (USA); 1990	Buper Dance	Lyphard
Sire Heart's Cry (JPN) 2001	Irish Dance (USA); 1990	Buper Dance	My Bupers
Dam Halwa Sweet (JPN) 2001	Machiavellian (USA); 1987	Mr. Prospector	Raise a Native
Dam Halwa Sweet (JPN) 2001	Machiavellian (USA); 1987	Mr. Prospector	Gold Digger
Dam Halwa Sweet (JPN) 2001	Machiavellian (USA); 1987	Coup de Folie	Halo
Dam Halwa Sweet (JPN) 2001	Machiavellian (USA); 1987	Coup de Folie	Raise the Standard
Dam Halwa Sweet (JPN) 2001	Halwa Song (USA); 1996	Nureyev	Northern Dancer
Dam Halwa Sweet (JPN) 2001	Halwa Song (USA); 1996	Nureyev	Special
Dam Halwa Sweet (JPN) 2001	Halwa Song (USA); 1996	Morn of Song	Blushing Groom
Dam Halwa Sweet (JPN) 2001	Halwa Song (USA); 1996	Morn of Song	Glorious Song

- Cheval Grand was inbred 3 × 4 to Halo, meaning that this stallion appeared in both the third and fourth generations of his pedigree.
