= Nikkei Shinshun Hai =

Nikkei Shinshun Hai 日経新春杯
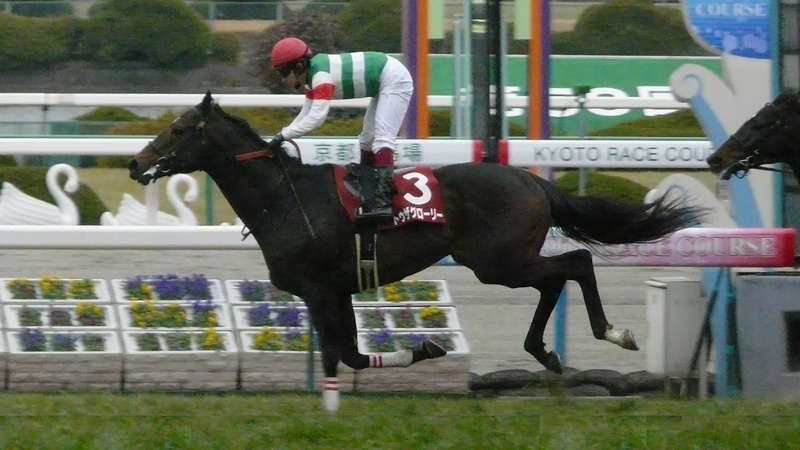
- 2012 Nikkei Shinshun Hai
- Class: Grade 2
- Location: Kyoto Racecourse, Fushimi-ku
- Inaugurated: January 17, 1954
- Race type: Thoroughbred Flat racing

Race information
- Distance: 2400 metres
- Surface: Turf
- Track: Right-handed
- Qualification: 4-y-o+
- Weight: Handicap
- Purse: ¥ 123,120,000 (as of 2026): 1st: ¥ 57,000,000; 2nd: ¥ 23,000,000; 3rd: ¥ 14,000,000

The Nikkei Shinshun Hai (日経新春杯) is a Grade 2 (GII) flat horse race in Japan.

== Background ==
The Nikkei Shinshun Hai is a Grade II Thoroughbred handicap race in Japan, open to horses aged four years and older. It is held annually in mid-January at Kyoto Racecourse over a distance of 2,400 meters on turf (outer course). Eligible entrants must have raced at least once, and include JRA-trained horses, up to two certified NAR (local) horses, and foreign-trained horses with priority entry.

As a handicap race, weights are assigned based on each horse’s past performance to ensure competitive balance. The first-place prize in 2026 was ¥57 million. The race is officially titled the “Nikkei Shinshun Hai”, named after its sponsor, the Nihon Keizai Shimbun (Nikkei) newspaper, and the winner receives the Nikkei Newspaper Prize. Notably, the winner also earns priority entry into Australia’s Group 1 Caulfield Cup.

== History ==
The Nikkei Shinshun Hai was first run on January 17, 1954, as the “Nihon Keizai Shinshun Hai” (日本経済新春杯) for horses aged five and older 5. It was renamed “Nikkei Shinshun Hai” in 1979. Originally contested over 2,400 meters on turf at Kyoto, the race briefly shifted to Hanshin Racecourse in 1980 and 1994. From 1987 to 1993, the distance was shortened to 2,200 meters. Weight conditions also varied: it began as a handicap, switched to weight-for-age (別定) from 1981 to 1993, then reverted to handicap thereafter. The race was elevated to Grade II status in 1984 with the introduction of JRA’s official grading system. International participation expanded gradually: foreign-bred horses were allowed from 1990, foreign-trained horses from 2006 (initially 4 runners), increasing to 8 in 2007 and 9 in 2015 following Japan’s IFHA Part I status. NAR horses gained eligibility in 2020.

Recent years saw temporary relocations due to infrastructure projects: it was held at Chukyo Racecourse over 2,200m from 2021 to 2023 and again in 2025.

== Past winners ==
Year	Winner	Age	Length (in m)	Jockey	Trainer	Owner	Time
1954	Daisan Hoshiu	4	T2400	Michio Ueda	Takeshi Ueda	Seijiro Ueda	2:34.4
1955	Fujimitsuru	4	T2400	Masaru Kurita	Takeshi Ueda	Seijiro Ueda	2:30.0
1956	Hiya Kiohgan	5	T2400	Masaru Kurita	Fumio Takeda	Chube Sakagami	2:33.4
1957	Nanba Ichiban	4	T2400	Makoto Osawa	Keiji Tamaya	Naoko Hamada	2:30.2
1958	Totsu Plan	4	T2400	Masaru Kurita	Fumio Takeda	Toyoji Sakaya	2:32.0
1959	Takaharu	4	T2400	Takeo Kondo	Katsuyoshi Ito	Koho	2:30.2
1960	Fusaryuu	4	T2400	Zenji Matsumoto	Fumio Takeda	Masayuki Atarashi	2:34.6
1961(dh)	Taikan	4	T2400	Masaru Kurita	Katsuyoshi Ito	Kumazo Hayashi	2:30.5
1961(dh)	Kiohgan Hikari	4	T2400	Yoshito Matsumoto	Fumio Takeda	Chube Sakagami	2:30.5
1962	Homare Taikou	4	T2400	Shuji Kitahashi	Masao Matsumoto	Toshio Ando	2:32.6
1963	Ryuforel	4	T2400	Noriyuki Miyamoto	Seisaku Hashimoto	Emiko Miyoshi	2:36.9
1964	Korai O	4	T2400	Kunichi Asami	Saburo Yoshida	Masatsugu Takada	2:35.8
1965	Ohime	4	T2400	Minoru Tashiro	Sosuke Ogawa	Masao Horiguchi	2:31.7
1966	Power Lassle	4	T2400	Yoshito Matsumoto	Tadashi Fuse	Chuji Hozumi	2:33.1
1967	Taikurana	5	T2400	Kunihiko Take	Heizo Take	Yoshio Akiyama	2:29.0
1968	Ryufaros	5	T2400	Noriyuki Miyamoto	Seisaku Hashimoto	Teizo Miyoshi	2:29.9
1969	Date Horai	4	T2400	Akihiko Uda	Izushi Hoshikawa	Date Bokujo	2:35.6
1970	Kinsen O	4	T2400	Isami Kohara	Shoichi Sakaguchi	Josaburo Nakano	2:27.6
1971	Continental	5	T2400	Akira Tsuda	Tomihisa Nohira	Asahi Bokujo	2:35.1
1972	Keishu	5	T2400	Yoshitaka Matsumoto	Kunichi Asami	Keiji Yoshi	2:37.0
1973	Yumond	4	T2400	Yoichi Fukunaga	Bungo Takeda	Masayuki Atarashi	2:33.1
1974	Hoshu Eito	4	T2400	Kunihiko Take	Kiyoshi Hirasako	Seijiro Ueda	2:29.4
1975	East River	5	T2400	Shuji Kitahashi	Masao Matsumoto	Katsutoshi Kawato	2:30.7
1976	Long Hawk	4	T2400	Yukiharu Matsuda	Yutaro Matsuda	Choichi Nakai	2:29.3
1977	Horsemen Hope	4	T2400	Yukiji Ono	Minoru Kobayashi	Tadashi Nakaji	2:27.7
1978	Zinkeight	4	T2400	Eiji Shimizu	Masaru Fukushima	Hoyishinobu Hayashi	2:28.6
1979	Suzuka Shimpū	4	T2400	Toshifumi Nakajima	Takeshi Ueda	Eiichi Nagai	2:28.5
1980	Mejiro Tranzam	4	T2400	Kunihiko Take	Kunichi Asami	Mejiro Shoji Co. Ltd.	2:27.3
1981	Kensei Good	4	T2400	Katsuichi Nishiura	Kenji Tomodashi	Kenzo Sugiyasu	2:29.0
1982	Ajishiba O	4	T2400	Ichizo Iwamoto	Megumu Niwa	Yasuharu Sato	2:29.8
1983	Over Rainbow	6	T2400	Yoshifumi Tanaka	Kumimi Tsuchikado	Shigezo Torii	2:28.9
1984^{[a]}	Erimo Laura	5	D2600	Shigetoshi Saruwatari	Keizo Umeuchi	Shinichi Yamamoto	2:43.3
1985	Masahiko Boy	6	T2400	Shigeaki Tanahara	Takeo Kubo	Sadao Miyamoto	2:29.0
1986	Fleet Hope	4	T2400	Shigetoshi Saruwatari	Keizo Umeuchi	Kiichi Kanemura	2:28.9
1987	Fresh Voice	4	T2200	Shigeaki Tanahara	Naoyuki Sakai	Kazuo Enjo	2:16.1
1988	Speed Hero	6	T2200	Hiroshi Kawachi	Hiroki Sakaki	Kosuke Ichikawa	2:15.3
1989	Land Hiryu	7	T2200	Hiroshi Kawachi	Minoru Kobayashi	Zenichi Kimura	2:14.4
1990	Towa Triple	4	T2200	Hitoshi Mato	Takashi Karasaki	Kenichi Iyama	2:15.0
1991	Mercy Attra	4	T2200	Hiroshi Kawachi	Koji Ono	Yasuo Nagai	2:13.6
1992	Kamino Cresse	5	T2200	Katsumi Minai	Yoshimi Kudo	Masaji Nogami	2:15.2
1993	El Casa River	4	T2200	Yasunari Yamada	Ryohei Tanaka	Clear Co. Ltd.	2:14.0
1994	Monsieur Chequeur	6	T2500	Shinji Fujita	Minoru Kobayashi	Keiichi Fujitate	2:35.5
1995	Go Go Zetto	4	T2400	Yoshinori Muramoto	Hitoshi Arai	Yoshinobu Hayashi	2:24.8
1996	Hagino Real King	6	T2400	Shinji Fujita	Minoru Kobayashi	Kokuchi Hikuma	2:26.7
1997	Mejiro Lambada	4	T2400	Yutaka Take	Yasuo Ikee	Mejiro Farm Ltd.	2:27.6
1998	Erimo Dandy	4	T2400	Yutaka Take	Masaaki Okubo	Shinichi Yamamoto	2:26.3
1999	Mejiro Bright	5	T2400	Hiroshi Kawachi	Hidekazu Asami	Mejiro Farm Ltd.	2:31.4
2000	Marvelous Timer	6	T2400	Yutaka Take	Terumasa Yano	Sadao Sasahara	2:24.3
2001	Stay Gold	7	T2400	Shinji Fujita	Yasuo Ikee	Shadai Race Horse Ltd.	2:25.8
2002	Top Commander	5	T2400	Hirofumi Shii	Hiroki Sakiyama	Joy Racehorse Co. Ltd.	2:26.4
2003	Bamboo Juventus	4	T2400	Hirofumi Shii	Yoshiyasu Tajima	Bamboo Farm Ltd.	2:25.8
2004	Silk Famous	5	T2400	Hirofumi Shii	Ippo Sameshina	Silk Ltd.	2:24.5
2005	Sakura Century	5	T2400	Tetsuzō Satō	Shozo Sasaki	Sakura Commerce Co. Ltd.	2:29.0
2006	Admire Fuji	4	T2400	Yuichi Fukunaga	Mitsuru Hashida	Riichi Kondo	2:26.3
2007	Tokai Wild	5	T2400	Katsumi Andō	Hitoshi Nakamura	Masanori Uchimura	2:27.4
2008	Admire Monarch	7	T2400	Katsumi Andō	Hiroyoshi Matsuda	Riichi Kondo	2:27.4
2009	T M Precure	6	T2400	Takuma Ogino	Tadao Igarashi	Masatsugu Takezono	2:26.6
2010	Meisho Beluga	5	T2400	Kenichi Ikezoe	Kaneo Ikezoe	Yoshio Matsumoto	2:24.4
2011	Rulership	4	T2400	Umberto Rispoli	Katsuhiko Sumii	Sunday Racing Ltd.	2:24.6
2012	To The Glory	5	T2400	Yuichi Fukunaga	Yasutoshi Ikee	Carrot Farm Ltd.	2:23.7
2013	Capote Star	4	T2400	Ryō Takakura	Yoshito Yahagi	Toshiko Bizenjima	2:25.0
2014	Satono Noblesse	4	T2400	Christophe Lemaire	Yasutoshi Ikee	Hajime Satomi	2:24.4
2015	Admire Deus	4	T2400	Yasunari Iwata	Mitsuru Hashida	Riichi Kondo	2:24.8
2016	Reve Mistral	4	T2400	Yuga Kawada	Hiroyoshi Matsuda	Sunday Racing Ltd.	2:25.9
2017	Mikki Rocket	4	T2400	Ryuji Wada	Hidetaka Otonashi	Mizuki Noda	2:25.7
2018	Perform A Promise	6	T2400	Mirco Demuro	Hideaki Fujiwara	Sunday Racing Ltd.	2:26.3
2019	Glory Vase	4	T2400	Mirco Demuro	Tomohito Ozeki	Silk Racing Ltd.	2:26.2
2020	Mozu Bello	4	T2400	Kenichi Ikezoe	Naoyuki Morita	Capital System Co. Ltd.	2:26.9
2021^{[b]}	Shoryu Ikuzo	5	T2200	Taisei Danno	Shozo Sasaki	Yoshie Ueda	2:11.8
2022^{[b]}	Yoho Lake	4	T2200	Yuga Kawada	Yasuo Tomomichi	Kaneko Masato Holdings Co. Ltd.	2:11.7
2023^{[b]}	Weltreisende	6	T2200	David Egan	Yasutoshi Ikee	Sunday Racing Ltd.	2:14.2
2024	Blow the Horn	5	T2400	Akira Sugawara	Eiji Nakano	Makio Okada	2:23.7
2025^{[c]}	Lord del Rey	5	T2200	Atsuya Nishimura	Mitsumasa Nakauchida	Road Horse Club Co. Ltd.	2:09.8
2026	Goltzschtal	4	T2400	Ryusei Sakai	Haruki Sugiyama	Sunday Racing Ltd.	2:25.7

^{a} The 1984 running was run on Dirt at the distance of 2,600m
^{b} The 2021, 2022 and 2023 runnings took place at Chukyo while Kyoto was closed for redevelopment.
^{c} The 2025 running took place at Chukyo while Hanshin was closed for redevelopment.

== See also ==
- Horse racing in Japan
- List of Japanese flat horse races

=== Netkeiba ===
- 1994 en, 1995 en, 1996 en, 1997 en, 1998 en, 1999 en, 2000 en, 2001 en, 2002 en, 2003 en, 2004 en, 2005 en, 2006 en, 2007 en, 2008 en, 2009 en, 2010 en, 2011 en, 2012 en, 2013 en, 2014 en, 2015 en, 2016 en, 2017 en, 2018 en, 2019 en, 2020 en, 2021 en, 2022 en, 2023 en, 2024 en, 2025 en, 2026 en
