= Dee Majesty =

Japanese-bred Thoroughbred racehorse

Dee Majesty; ディーマジェスティ
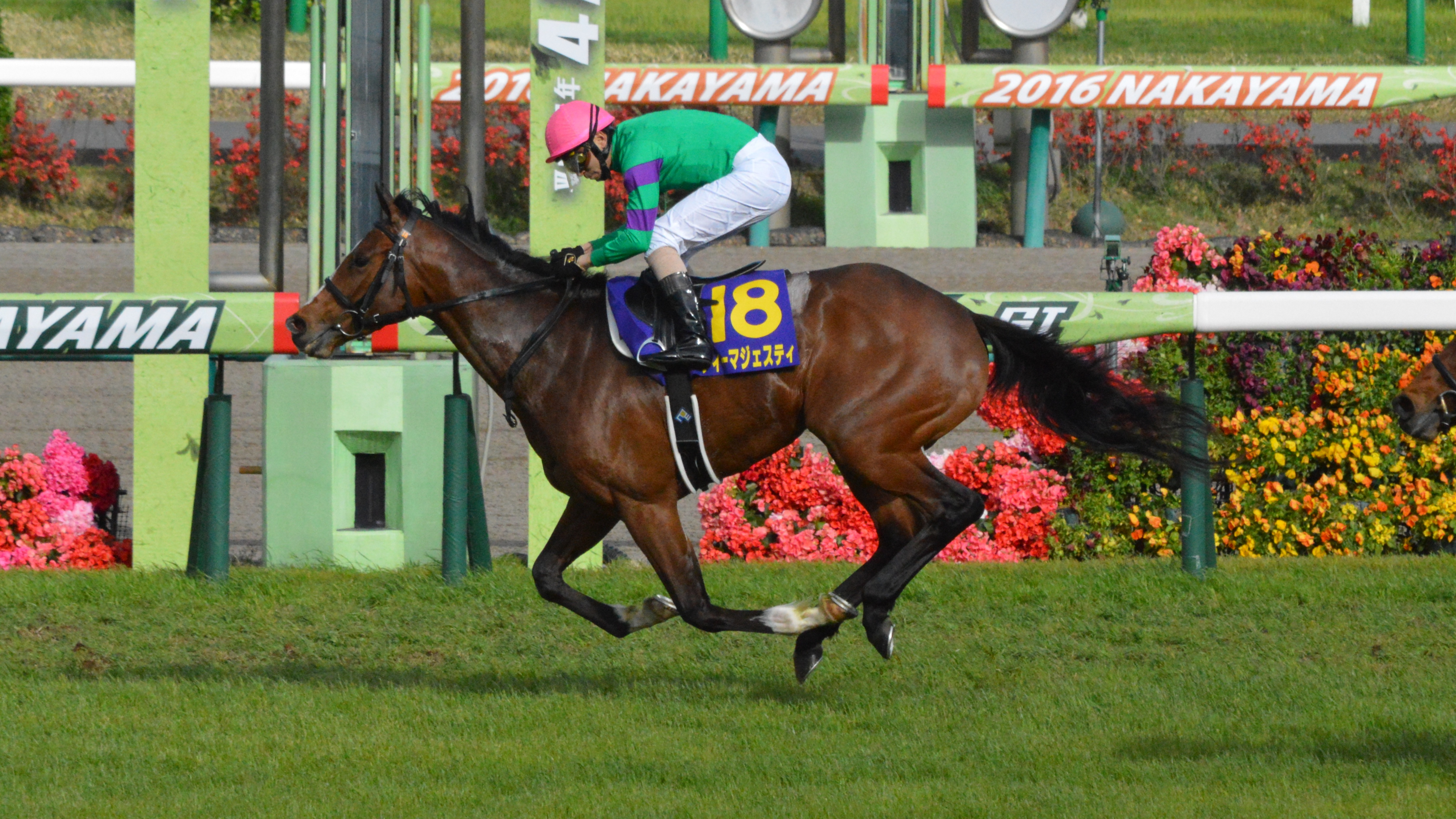
- Dee Majesty in 2016
- Sire: Deep Impact
- Grandsire: Sunday Silence
- Dam: Hermes Tiara
- Damsire: Brian's Time
- Sex: Stallion
- Foaled: 24 March 2013
- Country: Japan
- Colour: Bay
- Breeder: Hattori Bokujo
- Owner: Masaru Shimada
- Racing colours
- Trainer: Yoshitaka Ninomiya
- Jockey: Masayoshi Ebina
- Record: 11: 4-2-1
- Earnings: JPY302,432,000

Major wins
- Kyodo Tsushin Hai (2016); St Lite Kinen (2016); Japanese Classic Race wins: Satsuki Sho (2016)

Dee Majesty (Japanese: ディーマジェスティ, foaled 24 March 2013) is a Japanese Thoroughbred racehorse and sire. As a two-year-old in 2015 he showed some promise by finishing second in his first two starts and then winning a minor race before his season was ended by a leg infection. In 2016 he was one of the best colts of his generation in Japan, winning the Kyodo Tsushin Hai, Satsuki Sho and St Lite Kinen as well as finishing third in the Tokyo Yushun and fourth in the Kikuka Sho. He was retired from racing after two disappointing efforts in the spring of 2017.

== Background ==
Dee Majesty is a bay horse with a white blaze and white socks on his forelegs bred in Japan by his owner, Masaru Shimada's Hattori Farm. He was trained throughout his racing career by Yoshitaka Ninomiya.

He was from the sixth crop of foals sired by Deep Impact, who was the Japanese Horse of the Year in 2005 and 2006, winning races including the Tokyo Yushun, Tenno Sho, Arima Kinen and Japan Cup. Deep Impact's other progeny include Gentildonna, Harp Star, Kizuna, A Shin Hikari, Marialite and Saxon Warrior. His dam Hermes Tiara never raced but her mother was a half-sister to both Generous and Imagine.

Dee Majesty was described by his groom as embodying the best qualities of his male ancestors, having "the body of Brian's Time, the heart and lungs of Sadler's Wells and the sharpness of Deep Impact".

== Racing career ==
=== 2015: two-year-old season ===
Dee Majesty began his track career by finishing second to King Lion in an event for previously unraced juveniles over 1500 metres at Sapporo Racecourse on 5 September. Three weeks later at Nakayama Racecourse he contested a maiden race over 1800 metres came home second of the thirteen runners behind Meiner Fun. The colt recorded his first success at Tokyo Racecourse on 23 November when he won a maiden from Mount Robson and thirteen others. He was then aimed at the Grade 2 Hopeful Stakes but was withdrawn from the race owing to a leg inflammation.

=== 2016: three-year-old season ===
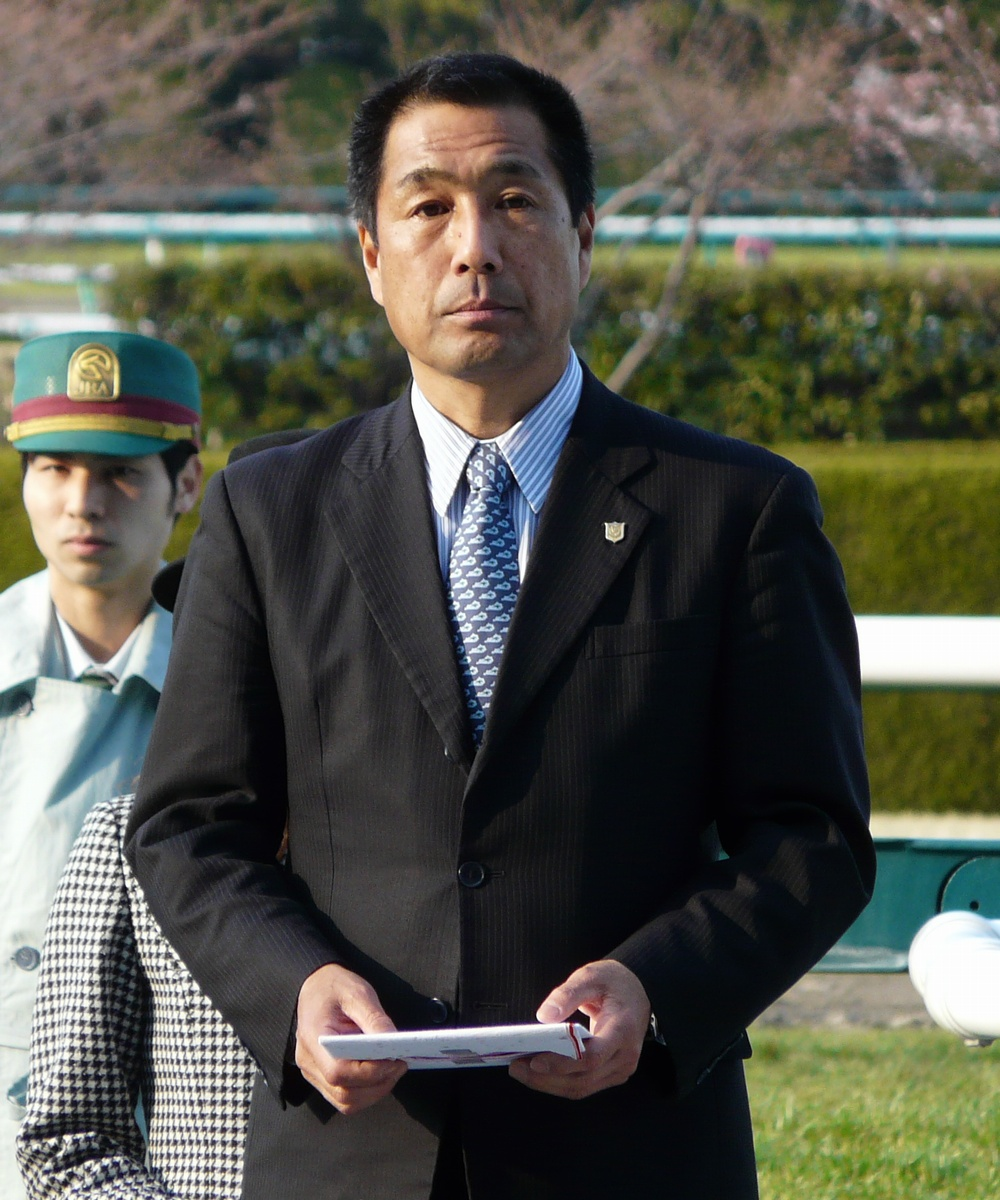
Dee Majesty's trainer Yoshitaka Ninomiya

On his debut as a three-year-old, Dee Majesty started a 21.6/1 outsider for the Grade 3 Kyodo Tsushin Hai over 1800 metres at Tokyo. Ridden by Masayoshi Ebina he won by one and a quarter lengths from Immortal with the odds-on favourite Hartley (winner of the Hopeful Stakes) coming home ninth of the ten finishers. Dee Majesty's trainer Yoshitaka Ninomiya commented "The rider was urging him on from just before the final turn but I think the going was at its worst right there. He gave it his all and peeled off from the rest of the field with the fastest final 3-furlong time of the field for what was a very strong race."

For his next run, Dee Majesty ran in the Grade 1 Satsuki Sho, the first leg of the Japanese Triple Crown over 2000 metres at Nakayama on 17 April. In the run-up to the race, Ninomiya said "He's still growing and is still a bit weak in his back and hindquarters, but he has gained a bit of weight and has the physique of a mature horse. He has an excellent heart and strong lungs and his breathing is very good." With Ebina in the saddle, Dee Majesty started a 30/1 outsider in a field of eighteen three-year-old colts. Satono Diamond started favourite ahead of Leontes and Makahiki while the other runners included Air Spinel (Daily Hai Nisai Stakes), Mount Robson (Spring Stakes), Lord Quest (second in the Hopeful Stakes), Admire Daio (Wakaba Stakes) and Dreadnoughtus (Kyoto Nisai Stakes). Dee Majsty raced towards the rear before making a forward move on the outside approaching the final turn. He produced a strong run in the straight, took the lead from Leontes 100 metres from the finish and drew away to win by one and a quarter lengths, with Makahiki taking second ahead of Satono Diamond. The winning time of 1:57.9 was a new record for the race. Masayoshi Ebina said "everything went as planned. He was responding really well turning the last corner and I knew then that he'll be able to take over the field at the top of the slope".

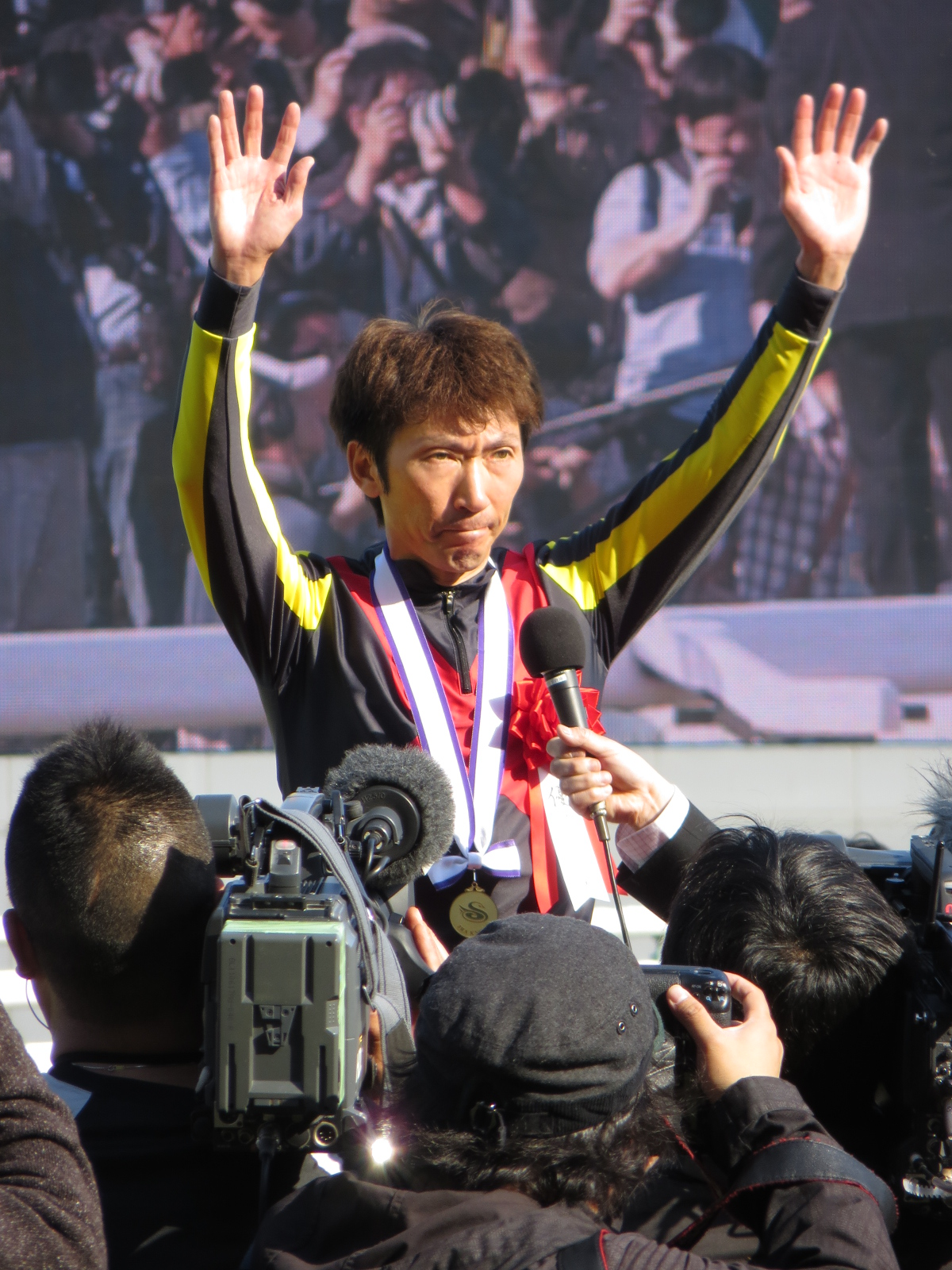
Dee Majesty's regular jockey Masayoshi Ebina

On 29 May, in front of a crowd of 140,000 at Tokyo, Dee Majesty started 2.5/1 favourite for the Tokyo Yushun with the best-fancied of his seventeen opponents being Satono Diamond, Makahiki and Leontes. Ebina repeated his tactics from the Satsuki Sho, coming from well off the pace before moving up on the outside for a late run in the straight, but on this occasion he was never able to get to the lead and finished third, beaten a nose and half a length by Makahiki and Satono Diamond.

After the summer break, Dee Majesty returned to the track in the Grade 2 St Lite Kinen over 2200 metres at Nakayama on 18 September and started odds-on favourite against eleven opponents headed by the Grade 3 winner Seewind. Ridden by Ebina, he won by a neck from Seewind, with Prodigal Son a length and a quarter back in third. On 23 October Dee Majesty started second choice in the betting for the Kikuka Sho over 2800 metres at Kyoto Racecourse but despite finishing strongly he came home fourth behind Satono Diamond, Rainbow Line and Air Spinel, beaten two and three quarter lengths by the winner. On his final race of the year, the colt was matched against older horses in the Japan Cup on 27 November but made no impact and finished towards the rear of the field in a race won by Kitasan Black.

In the 2016 edition of the World's Best Racehorse Rankings Dee Majesty was given a rating of 120, making him the 34th best racehorse in the world.

=== 2017: four-year-old season ===
Dee Majesty began his third season in the Nikkei Sho at Nakayama on 25 March and finished sixth of the sixteen runners behind Sciacchetra. A month later he started a 35/1 outsider for the spring edition of the Tenno Sho at Kyoto and came home sixth in a race won by Kitasan Black. Dee Majesty never raced again and was retired at the end of the season.

== Racing form ==
Dee Majesty won four races, finished in second twice and third once out of 11 starts. This data is available based on JBIS and Netkeiba.

Date	Track	Race	Grade	Distance (Condition)	Entry	HN	Odds (Favored)	Finish	Time	Margins	Jockey	Winner (Runner-up)
2015 – two-year-old season
Sep 5	Sapporo	2yo Newcomer		1,500 m (Good)	14	1	4.1 (3)	2nd	1:32.2	0.0	Christophe Lemaire	King Lion
Sep 26	Nakayama	2yo Maiden		1,800 m (Good)	13	4	1.6 (1)	2nd	1:49.3	0.1	Masayoshi Ebina	Meiner Fun
Nov 23	Tokyo	2yo Maiden		2,000 m (Firm)	15	14	2.6 (1)	1st	2:01.8	0.0	Masayoshi Ebina	(Mount Robson)
Dec 27	Nakayama	Hopeful Stakes	2	2,000 m (Firm)	12	7	–	Scratched	–	–	Masayoshi Ebina	Hartley
2016 – three-year-old season
Feb 14	Tokyo	Kyodo News Service Hai	3	1,800 m (Good)	10	4	22.6 (6)	1st	1:47.4	–0.2	Masayoshi Ebina	(Immortal)
Apr 17	Nakayama	Satsuki Sho	1	2,000 m (Firm)	18	18	30.9 (8)	1st	R1:57.9	–0.2	Masayoshi Ebina	(Makahiki)
May 29	Tokyo	Tokyo Yushun	1	2,400 m (Firm)	18	1	3.5 (1)	3rd	2:24.1	0.1	Masayoshi Ebina	Makahiki
Sep 18	Nakayama	St Lite Kinen	2	2,200 m (Firm)	12	4	1.4 (1)	1st	2:13.1	0.0	Masayoshi Ebina	(Seewind)
Oct 23	Kyoto	Kikuka Sho	1	3,000 m (Firm)	18	6	3.2 (2)	4th	3:03.8	0.5	Masayoshi Ebina	Satono Diamond
Nov 27	Tokyo	Japan Cup	1	2,400 m (Firm)	17	9	7.5 (4)	13th	2:27.1	1.3	Masayoshi Ebina	Kitasan Black
2017 – four-year-old season
Mar 25	Nakayama	Nikkei Sho	2	2,500 m (Firm)	16	6	6.7 (3)	6th	2:33.3	0.5	Masayoshi Ebina	Schiacchetra
Apr 30	Kyoto	Tenno Sho (Spring)	1	3,200 m (Firm)	17	9	35.8 (8)	6th	3:13.5	1.0	Masayoshi Ebina	Kitasan Black

Legend:
Turf

- R indicated that it was a record finish time.

== Stud record ==
After the end of his racing career, Dee Majesty became a breeding stallion at the Arrow Stud in Hokkaido. He had his first graded stakes winning progeny in Wonder Dean who won the 2026 UAE Derby.

== Pedigree ==
Pedigree of Dee Majesty (JPN), bay colt 2013
Sire Deep Impact (JPN) 2002	Sunday Silence (USA); 1986	Halo	Hail to Reason
Sire Deep Impact (JPN) 2002	Sunday Silence (USA); 1986	Halo	Cosmah
Sire Deep Impact (JPN) 2002	Sunday Silence (USA); 1986	Wishing Well	Understanding
Sire Deep Impact (JPN) 2002	Sunday Silence (USA); 1986	Wishing Well	Mountain Flower
Sire Deep Impact (JPN) 2002	Wind in Her Hair (IRE); 1991	Alzao (USA)	Lyphard
Sire Deep Impact (JPN) 2002	Wind in Her Hair (IRE); 1991	Alzao (USA)	Lady Rebecca (GB)
Sire Deep Impact (JPN) 2002	Wind in Her Hair (IRE); 1991	Burghclere (GB)	Busted
Sire Deep Impact (JPN) 2002	Wind in Her Hair (IRE); 1991	Burghclere (GB)	Highclere
Dam Hermes Tiara (JPN) 1998	Brian's Time (USA); 1985	Roberto	Hail to Reason
Dam Hermes Tiara (JPN) 1998	Brian's Time (USA); 1985	Roberto	Bramalea
Dam Hermes Tiara (JPN) 1998	Brian's Time (USA); 1985	Kelley' Day	Graustark
Dam Hermes Tiara (JPN) 1998	Brian's Time (USA); 1985	Kelley' Day	Golden Trail
Dam Hermes Tiara (JPN) 1998	Shinko Hermes (IRE); 1993	Sadler's Wells (USA)	Northern Dancer (CAN)
Dam Hermes Tiara (JPN) 1998	Shinko Hermes (IRE); 1993	Sadler's Wells (USA)	Fairy Bridge
Dam Hermes Tiara (JPN) 1998	Shinko Hermes (IRE); 1993	Doff the Derby (USA)	Master Derby
Dam Hermes Tiara (JPN) 1998	Shinko Hermes (IRE); 1993	Doff the Derby (USA)	Margarethen (Family: 4-n)

- Dee Majesty was inbred 4 × 4 to Hail To Reason, meaning that this stallion appears twice in the fourth generation of his pedigree.
