= Epoca d'Oro =

Japanese-bred Thoroughbred racehorse

Epoca d'Oro エポカドーロ
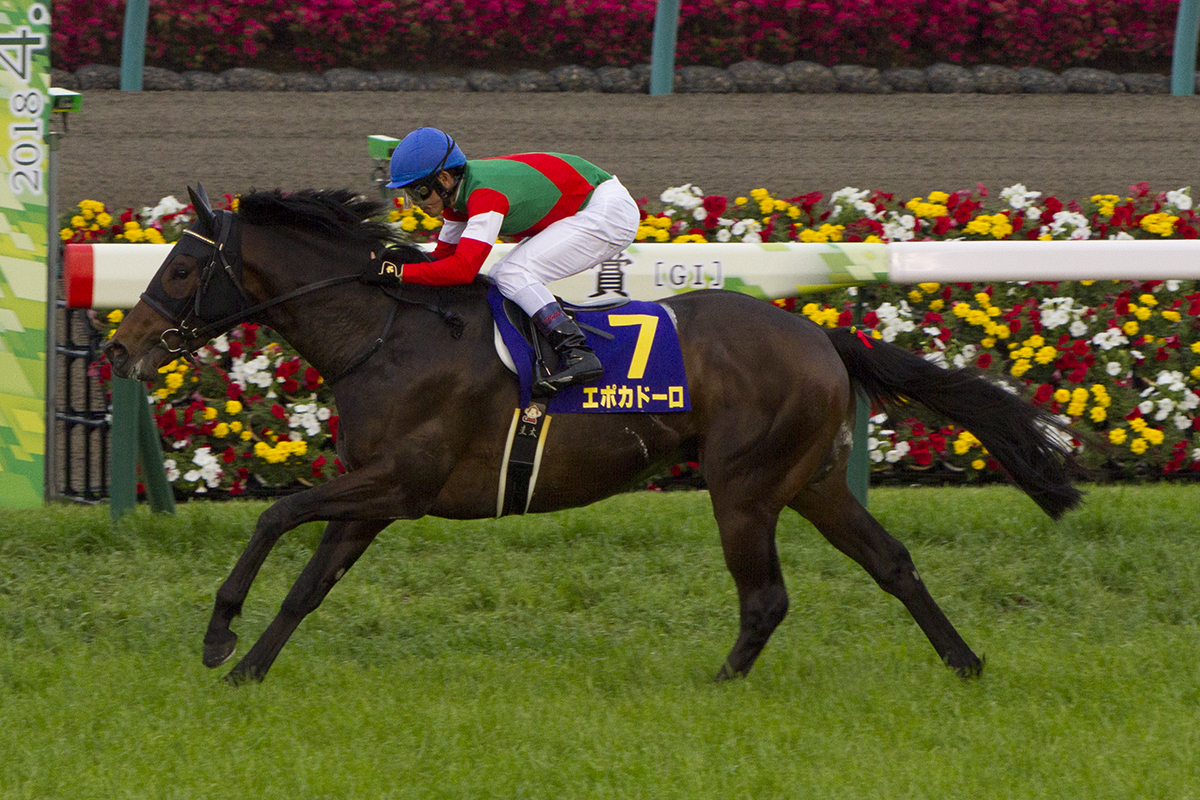
- Epoca d'Oro wins the Satsuki Sho
- Sire: Orfevre
- Grandsire: Stay Gold
- Dam: Daiwa Passion
- Damsire: Forty Niner
- Sex: Stallion
- Foaled: 15 February 2015
- Country: Japan
- Colour: Bay
- Breeder: Toru Tagami
- Owner: K Hidaka Breeders Union
- Racing colours
- Trainer: Hideaki Fujiwara
- Jockey: Keita Tosaki
- Record: 10: 3-2-1
- Earnings: ¥276,364,000

Major wins
- Japanese Classic Race wins: Satsuki Sho (2018)

Epoca d'Oro (Japanese: エポカドーロ, Hepburn: Epoka Dōro; 15 February 2015) is a retired Japanese Thoroughbred racehorse and sire. After finishing third on his only appearance as a two-year-old in 2017 he showed steady improvement in the following spring, winning two minor races and finishing second in the Spring Stakes before recording his biggest success in the Satsuki Sho. He went on to finish runner-up in the Tokyo Yushun but failed to reproduce his best form in two subsequent starts that year.

== Background ==
Epoca d'Oro is a bay colt bred in Japan by Toru Tagami. As a foal in 2015 he was consigned to the Select Sale and was bought for ¥36,720,000 by the Union Owners Club. The colt was sent into training with Hideaki Fujiwara. He was ridden in most of his races by Keita Kosaki.

He was from the first crop of foals sired by Orfevre, who was the Japanese Horse of the Year in 2011 and was the Triple Crown winner that year as well as coming in second place in the Prix de l'Arc de Triomphe for two years in a row. Orfevre's other progeny include Lucky Lilac, winner of the 2017 JRA Award for Best Two-Year-Old Filly. Epoca d'Oro's dam Daiwa Passion was a top-class performer whose wins included the Fairy Stakes and the Fillies' Revue. She was a great-granddaughter of the outstanding Irish mare Cairn Rouge whose other descendants have included Persuasive.

== Racing career ==
=== 2017: two-year-old season ===
Epoca d'Oro made his first and only appearance as a two-year-old in a contest for previously unraced juveniles over 1800 metres at Kyoto Racecourse on 9 October. Racing on firm turf he finished third of the ten runners behind Tanglewood and Satono Eternal.

=== 2018: three-year-old season ===
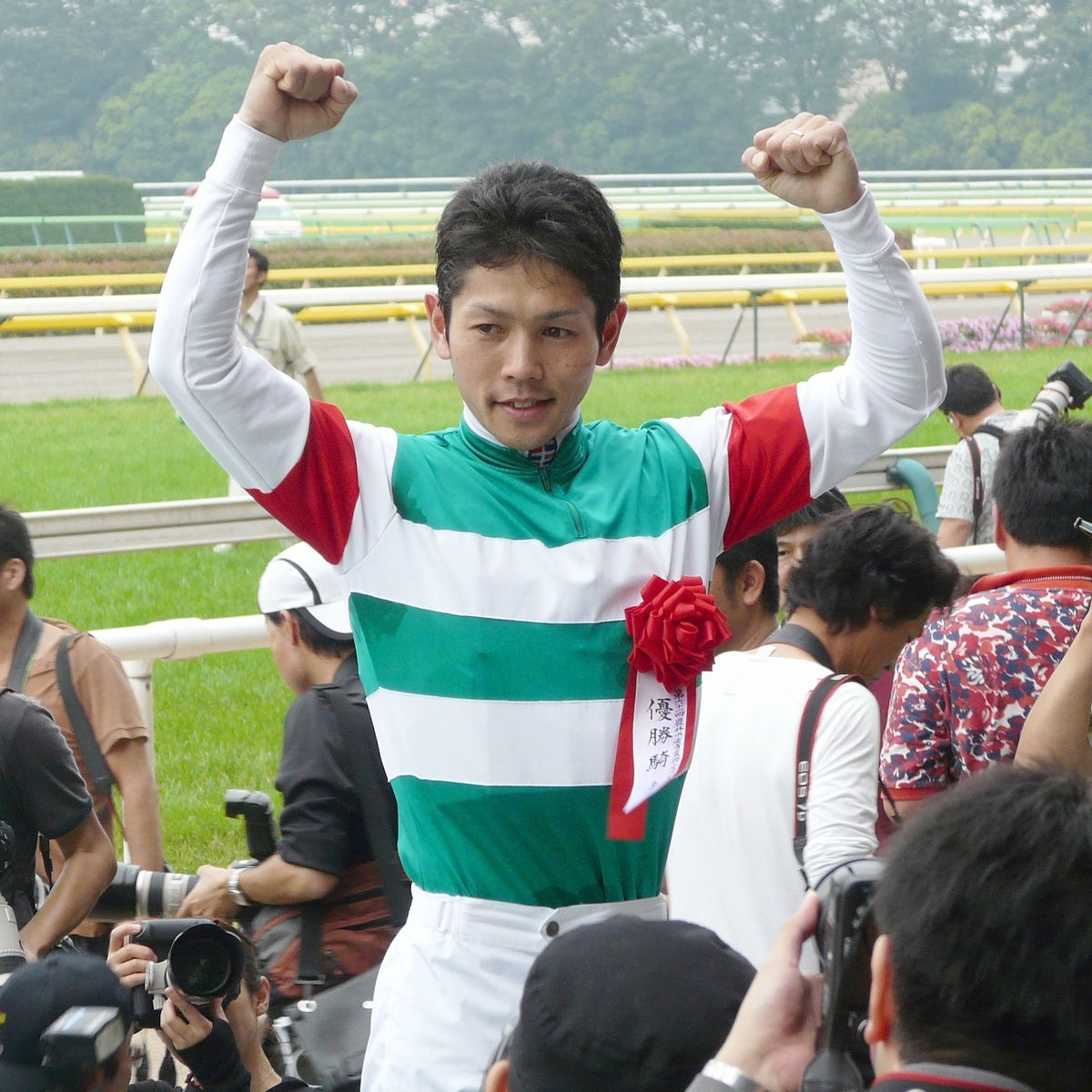
Epoca d'Oro's regular jockey Keita Tosaki

On his three-year-old debut Epoca d'Oro recorded his first victory when he defeated Rano Kau and fourteen others in a maiden race over 1600 metres at Kyoto on 21 January. Three weeks later he was stepped up in distance and followed up successfully in the Asunaro Sho over 2000 metres at Kokura Racecourse. In the following month he was moved up in class for the Grade 2 Spring Stakes (a trial race for the Satsuki Sho) over 1800 metres at Nakayama Racecourse and was made the 4.3/1 third choice in a field of thirteen runners. Ridden by Tosaki he settled in second place before taking the lead in the straight but was caught on the line and beaten a nose by the favourite Stelvio.

On 15 April at the same track Epoca d'Oro, with Tosaki again in the saddle, started at odds of 13.5/1 for the 78th edition of the Satsuki Sho over 2000 metres. Wagnerian started favourite ahead of Stelvio with the other thirteen runners including Kitano Commandeur (Sumire Stakes), Time Flyer (Hopeful Stakes, Gendarme (Daily Hai Nisai Stakes), Oken Moon (Tokinominoru Kinen) and Generale Uno (Keisei Stakes). Aithon set a strong pace from Jun Valerot and Generale Uno with the trio pulling many lengths clear of the others who were headed by Epoca d'Oro. The leaders began to tire approaching the final turn and Epoca d'Oro gained the advantage from Generale Uno in the last 200 metres before drawing away to win by two lengths from Sans Rival. Tosaki commented "I was able to position him as planned. He ran in good rhythm and responded well rounding the final corner. He's a smart horse and is developing with each race. His powerful run today shows that he will have no problem handling the extra distance in the Tokyo Yushun".

At Tokyo Racecourse on 27 May Epoca d'Oro was made the 8.5/1 fourth choice behind Danon Premium, Blast Onepiece and Kitano Commandeur in the 85th running of the Tokyo Yushun over 2400 metres. He took the lead soon after the start, led the field into the straight and repelled several challengers before being caught in the final strides by Wagnerian and beaten half a length into second place.

After a break of almost four months the colt returned for the Kobe Shimbun Hai at Hanshin Racecourse in September and started joint-favourite with Wagnerian. After stumbling as he exited the starting gate he raced towards the rear of the field before staying on in the straight and came home fourth of the ten runners. On his final start of the season Epoca d'Oro started third favourite for the Kikuka Sho over 3000 metres. He was in contention for most of the way but faded in the closing stages to finish eighth behind Fierement, beaten five lengths by the winner.

In the 2018 World's Best Racehorse Rankings Epoca d'Oro was rated the 15th best three-year-old colt in the world and the 78th best horse of any age or sex. In January 2019 Epoca d'Oro finished fourth behind Blast Onepiece, Wagnerian and the dirt champion Le Vent Se Leve in the poll to determine the JRA Award for Best Three-Year-Old Colt for 2018 .

=== 2019 and 2020: four-and-five-year-old season ===
Epoca d'Oro began his third campaign in the Grade 2 Nakayama Kinen on 24 February and came home fifth of the eleven starters behind Win Bright, Lucky Lilac, Stelvio and Suave Richard, beaten two lengths by the winner. In the Grade 1 Osaka Hai the horse started a 13.3/1 outsider in a fourteen-runner field. He set the pace and maintained his advantage into the straight but dropped away quickly in the closing stages and finished tenth behind Al Ain.

Epoca d'Oro did not race again due to numerous health issues before formally retiring from horse racing in August 2020.

== Racing form ==
Epoca d'Oro won three races out of 10 starts. This data is based on JBIS and netkeiba.

Date	Track	Race	Grade	Distance (Condition)	Entry	HN	Odds (Favored)	Finish	Time	Margins	Jockey	Winner (Runner-up)
2017 – two-year-old season
Oct 9	Kyoto	2yo Newcomer		1,800 m (Firm)	10	6	17.2 (4)	3rd	1:50.9	0.5	Yuichi Kitamura	Tanglewood
2018 – three-year-old season
Jan 21	Kyoto	3yo Maiden		1,600 m (Firm)	16	8	5.6 (4)	1st	1:36.1	–0.4	Yuichi Fukunaga	(Rano Kau)
Feb 10	Kokura	Asunaro Sho	ALW (1W)	2,000 m (Good)	12	1	2.5 (1)	1st	2:00.8	–0.6	Keita Tosaki	(Super Feather)
Mar 18	Nakayama	Spring Stakes	2	1,800 m (Firm)	13	5	5.3 (3)	2nd	1:48.1	0.0	Keita Tosaki	Stelvio
Apr 15	Nakayama	Satsuki Sho	1	2,000 m (Good)	16	7	14.5 (7)	1st	2:00.8	–0.3	Keita Tosaki	(Sans Rival)
May 27	Tokyo	Tokyo Yushun	1	2,400 m (Firm)	18	12	10.5 (4)	2nd	2:23.7	0.1	Keita Tosaki	Wagnerian
Sep 23	Hanshin	Kobe Shimbun Hai	2	2,400 m (Firm)	10	8	2.7 (1)	4th	2:26.1	0.5	Keita Tosaki	Wagnerian
Oct 21	Kyoto	Kikuka Sho	1	3,000 m (Firm)	18	5	5.5 (3)	8th	3:06.9	0.8	Keita Tosaki	Fierement
2019 – four-year-old season
Feb 24	Nakayama	Nakayama Kinen	2	1,800 m (Firm)	11	9	5.3 (3)	5th	1:45.7	0.2	Keita Tosaki	Win Bright
Mar 31	Hanshin	Osaka Hai	1	2,000 m (Firm)	14	4	14.3 (8)	10th	2:02.0	1.0	Keita Tosaki	Al Ain

Legend:
Turf

== Stud career ==
Epoca d'Oro stood stud for 500,000JPY at the Arrow Stud in Shinhidaka, Hokkaido from 2021 to 2025. In September 2025, Epoca d'Oro was moved to the Versailles Farm where he is currently pensioned.

== Pedigree ==
Pedigree of Epoca d'Oro (JPN), bay or brown colt 2015
Sire Orfevre (JPN) 2008	Stay Gold (JPN); 1994	Sunday Silence (USA	Halo
Sire Orfevre (JPN) 2008	Stay Gold (JPN); 1994	Sunday Silence (USA	Wishing Well
Sire Orfevre (JPN) 2008	Stay Gold (JPN); 1994	Golden Sash	Dictus (FR)
Sire Orfevre (JPN) 2008	Stay Gold (JPN); 1994	Golden Sash	Dyna Sash
Sire Orfevre (JPN) 2008	Oriental Art (JPN); 1997	Mejiro McQueen	Mejiro Titan
Sire Orfevre (JPN) 2008	Oriental Art (JPN); 1997	Mejiro McQueen	Mejiro Aurora
Sire Orfevre (JPN) 2008	Oriental Art (JPN); 1997	Electro Art	Northern Taste (CAN)
Sire Orfevre (JPN) 2008	Oriental Art (JPN); 1997	Electro Art	Grandma Stevens (USA)
Dam Daiwa Passion (JPN) 2003	Forty Niner (USA); 1985	Mr Prospector	Raise A Native
Dam Daiwa Passion (JPN) 2003	Forty Niner (USA); 1985	Mr Prospector	Gold Digger
Dam Daiwa Passion (JPN) 2003	Forty Niner (USA); 1985	File	Tom Rolfe
Dam Daiwa Passion (JPN) 2003	Forty Niner (USA); 1985	File	Continue
Dam Daiwa Passion (JPN) 2003	Sun Rouge (JPN); 1992	Shady Heights (GB)	Shirley Heights
Dam Daiwa Passion (JPN) 2003	Sun Rouge (JPN); 1992	Shady Heights (GB)	Vaguely
Dam Daiwa Passion (JPN) 2003	Sun Rouge (JPN); 1992	Tikanova (USA)	Northern Dancer (CAN)
Dam Daiwa Passion (JPN) 2003	Sun Rouge (JPN); 1992	Tikanova (USA)	Cairn Rouge (IRE) (Family: 1-l)
