= 2018 World's Best Racehorse Rankings =

The 2018 World's Best Racehorse Rankings, sponsored by Longines was the 2018 edition of the World's Best Racehorse Rankings. It was an assessment of Thoroughbred racehorses issued by the International Federation of Horseracing Authorities (IFHA) on 24 January 2019. It included horses aged three or older which competed in flat races during 2018. It was open to all horses irrespective of where they raced or were trained.

== Rankings for 2018 ==
- For a detailed guide to this table, see below.

Rank	Rating	Horse	Age	Sex	Trained	Surface	Cat.
1	130	Cracksman (GB)	4	C	GB	Turf	I
1	130	Winx (AUS)	7	M	AUS	Turf	M
3	128	Accelerate (USA)	5	H	USA	Dirt	I
4	127	Beauty Generation (NZ)	6	G	HK	Turf	M
4	127	Gun Runner (USA)	5	H	USA	Dirt	M
4	127	Roaring Lion (USA)	3	C	GB	Turf	I
7	126	Poet's Word (IRE)	5	H	GB	Turf	I, L
8	125	Crystal Ocean (GB)	4	C	GB	Turf	L
8	125	Enable (GB)	4	F	GB	Turf	L
8	125	Justify (USA)	3	C	USA	Dirt	I
11	124	Almond Eye (JPN)	3	F	JPN	Turf	L
11	124	Alpha Centauri (IRE)	3	F	IRE	Turf	M
11	124	Roy H (USA)	6	G	USA	Dirt	S
14	123	Battaash (IRE)	4	G	GB	Turf	S
14	123	Benbatl (IRE)	4	C	GB, UAE	Turf	M, I
14	123	Cloth of Stars (IRE)	5	H	FR	Turf	L
14	123	Happy Clapper (AUS)	8	G	AUS	Turf	M
14	123	Rey de Oro (JPN)	4	C	JPN	Turf	L
14	123	Trapeze Artist (AUS)	4	C	AUS	Turf	S
20	122	Blast Onepiece (JPN)	3	C	JPN	Turf	L
20	122	Catholic Boy (USA)	3	C	USA	Dirt	I
20	122	Harry Angel (IRE)	4	C	GB	Turf	S
20	122	Kiseki (JPN)	4	C	JPN	Turf	L
20	122	Magical (IRE)	3	F	IRE	Turf	L
20	122	Redzel (AUS)	6	G	AUS	Turf	S
20	122	Santa Ana Lane (AUS)	6	G	AUS	Turf	S
20	122	Sea of Class (IRE)	3	F	GB	Turf	L
20	122	Thunder Snow (IRE)	4	C	UAE, GB	Dirt	I
20	122	Waldgeist (GB)	4	C	FR	Turf	L
20	122	West Coast (USA)	4	C	USA	Dirt	M
31	121	Best Solution (IRE)	4	C	GB	Turf	L
31	121	Good Magic (USA)	3	C	USA	Dirt	M
31	121	Gunnevera (USA)	4	C	USA	Dirt	I
31	121	Hartnell (GB)	7	G	AUS	Turf	M
31	121	Ivictory (AUS)	5	G	HK	Turf	S
31	121	Masar (IRE)	3	C	GB	Turf	L
31	121	Mr Stunning (AUS)	6	G	HK	Turf	S
31	121	Recoletos (FR)	4	C	FR	Turf	M
31	121	Redkirk Warrior (GB)	7	G	AUS	Turf	S
31	121	Saxon Warrior (JPN)	3	C	IRE	Turf	I
31	121	Suave Richard (JPN)	4	C	JPN	Turf	I
42	120	Audible (USA)	3	C	USA	Dirt	I
42	120	Blue Point (IRE)	4	C	GB	Turf	S
42	120	City of Light (USA)	4	C	USA	Dirt	M
42	120	Diversify (USA)	5	G	USA	Dirt	M, I
42	120	Gailo Chop (FR)	7	G	AUS	Turf	I
42	120	Grunt (NZ)	4	C	AUS	Turf	M
42	120	Hawkbill (USA)	5	H	UAE	Turf	L
42	120	Imperial Hint (USA)	5	H	USA	Dirt	S
42	120	Kew Gardens (IRE)	3	C	IRE	Turf	E
42	120	Mind Your Biscuits (USA)	5	H	USA	Dirt	M
42	120	Pakistan Star (GER)	5	G	HK	Turf	I, L
42	120	Puerto Escondido (ARG)	5	H	ARG	Turf	I
42	120	Stradivarius (IRE)	4	C	GB	Turf	E
42	120	Sungrazer (JPN)	4	C	JPN	Turf	I
42	120	The Autumn Sun (AUS)	3	C	AUS	Turf	M
42	120	Time Warp (GB)	5	G	HK	Turf	M, I
42	120	Yoshida (JPN)	4	C	USA	Dirt	M, I
59	119	Army Mule (USA)	4	C	USA	Dirt	S
59	119	Cheval Grand (JPN)	6	H	JPN	Turf	L
59	119	D B Pin (NZ)	6	G	HK	Turf	S
59	119	Expert Eye (GB)	3	C	GB	Turf	M
59	119	Exultant (IRE)	4	G	HK	Turf	L
59	119	Glorious Forever (GB)	4	G	HK	Turf	I
59	119	Impending (AUS)	5	H	AUS	Turf	M
59	119	Kementari (AUS)	4	C	AUS	Turf	M
59	119	Last Winter (SAF)	5	H	SAF	Turf	I
59	119	Le Romain (AUS)	6	G	AUS	Turf	S, M
59	119	Levendi (AUS)	4	C	AUS	Turf	L
59	119	Lightning Spear (GB)	7	H	GB	Turf	M
59	119	Mendelssohn (USA)	3	C	IRE	Dirt	I
59	119	Mikki Rocket (JPN)	5	H	JPN	Turf	L
59	119	Persian Knight (JPN)	4	C	JPN	Turf	I
59	119	U S Navy Flag (USA)	3	C	IRE	Turf	S
59	119	Vega Magic (AUS)	6	G	AUS	Turf	S
59	119	Wagnerian (JPN)	3	C	JPN	Turf	L
59	119	Werther (NZ)	7	G	HK	Turf	I
78	118	Abel Tasman (USA)	4	F	USA	Dirt	M
78	118	Al Ain (JPN)	4	C	JPN	Turf	I, L
78	118	Beat The Clock (AUS)	5	G	HK	Turf	S, M
78	118	Brave Smash (JPN)	5	H	AUS	Turf	S, M
78	118	Capri (IRE)	4	C	IRE	Turf	L
78	118	Catalina Cruiser (USA)	4	C	USA	Dirt	S
78	118	Comin' Through (AUS)	5	G	AUS	Turf	I
78	118	Coral Fever (SAF)	6	G	SAF	Turf	M, I
78	118	Dee Ex Bee (GB)	3	C	GB	Turf	L
78	118	Desert Encounter (IRE)	6	G	GB	Turf	L
78	118	Do It Again (SAF)	4	G	SAF	Turf	L
78	118	Dschingis Secret (GER)	5	H	GER	Turf	L
78	118	Epoca d'Oro (JPN)	3	C	JPN	Turf	I
78	118	Ertijaal (IRE)	7	G	UAE	Turf	S
78	118	Helene Paragon (FR)	6	H	HK	Turf	M
78	118	Hot King Prawn (AUS)	4	G	HK	Turf	S
78	118	Humidor (NZ)	6	G	AUS	Turf	I
78	118	Iquitos (GER)	6	H	GER	Turf	L
78	118	Jungle Cat (IRE)	6	H	GB	Turf	M
78	118	Lancaster Bomber (USA)	4	C	IRE	Turf	I
78	118	Legal Eagle (SAF)	7	G	SAF	Turf	M
78	118	Le Vent Se Leve (JPN)	3	C	JPN	Dirt	M
78	118	Marinaresco (SAF)	6	G	SAF	Turf	I
78	118	Merchant Navy (AUS)	4	C	IRE	Turf	S
78	118	Monarchs Glen (GB)	4	G	GB	Turf	I
78	118	Monomoy Girl (USA)	3	F	USA	Dirt	M
78	118	Mozu Ascot (USA)	4	C	JPN	Turf	M
78	118	North America (GB)	6	G	UAE	Dirt	I
78	118	Old Persian (GB)	3	C	GB	Turf	L
78	118	Osborne Bulls (AUS)	5	G	AUS	Turf	S
78	118	Rainbow Line (JPN)	5	H	JPN	Turf	E
78	118	Sands of Mali (FR)	3	C	GB	Turf	S
78	118	Seasons Bloom (AUS)	6	G	HK	Turf	I
78	118	Stelvio (JPN)	3	C	JPN	Turf	M
78	118	Thewizardofoz (AUS)	7	G	HK	Turf	S, M
78	118	Thundering Blue (USA)	5	G	GB	Turf	I
78	118	Torcedor (IRE)	6	G	IRE	Turf	E
78	118	Vazirabad (FR)	6	G	FR	Turf	E
78	118	Wind Chimes (GB)	3	F	FR	Turf	M

== Guide ==
A complete guide to the main table above.

Rank
A horse's position in the list, with the most highly rated at number 1. Each horse is ranked once according to its highest rating. Any lesser ratings for the same horse are not ranked.

Rating
A rating represents a weight value in pounds, with higher values given to horses which showed greater ability. It is judged that these weights would equalise the abilities of the horses if carried in a theoretical handicap race. The minimum rating required for inclusion is 115.

Horse
Each horse's name is followed by a suffix (from the IFHA's International Code of Suffixes) which indicates the country foaled.

Age
The age of the horse at the time it achieved its rating. The racing ages of all horses foaled in a particular part of the world increase simultaneously, regardless of the actual date of foaling.
Dates of age increase by location foaled
Northern Hemisphere	1 January
South America	1 July
Australia, New Zealand and South Africa	1 August

Sex
C	Colt	Ungelded male horse up to four-years-old
F	Filly	Female horse up to four-years-old
H	Horse	Ungelded male horse over four-years-old
M	Mare	Female horse over four-years-old
G	Gelding	Gelded male horse of any age

Trained
The country where the horse was trained at the time of the rating, abbreviated using the International Code of Suffixes.

Position
The horse's finishing position in the race shown. The actual finishing order can sometimes be amended following an inquiry or a disqualification.
=	Dead-heat
↑	Promoted from original finishing position
↓	Relegated from original finishing position

Race
The race (or one of the races) for which the horse achieved its rating. A defeated horse can be rated above its higher-placed opponents if it carried more weight.

Surface
The surface of the track on which the race was run, eg. turf or dirt. Synthetic surfaces are described as "artificial".

Distance
The distance of the race in metres. In some countries (eg. Canada, Great Britain, Ireland and the United States), the length of a race is usually expressed in miles and furlongs. These units have been converted to metres to allow for universal comparison.
Common conversions
5 furlongs	= 1,006 m	1 mile and 1½ furlongs	= 1,911 m
6 furlongs	= 1,207 m	1 mile and 2 furlongs	= 2,012 m
6½ furlongs	= 1,308 m	1 mile and 2½ furlongs	= 2,112 m
7 furlongs	= 1,408 m	1 mile and 3 furlongs	= 2,213 m
7½ furlongs	= 1,509 m	1 mile and 4 furlongs	= 2,414 m
1 mile	= 1,609 m	1 mile and 6 furlongs	= 2,816 m
1 mile and ½ furlong	= 1,710 m	2 miles	= 3,219 m
1 mile and 1 furlong	= 1,811 m	2 miles and 4 furlongs	= 4,023 m

Category
		Metres	Furlongs
S	Sprint	1,000–1,300; 1,000–1,599 (CAN / USA)	5–6.5; 5–7.99 (CAN / USA)
M	Mile	1,301–1,899; 1,600–1,899 (CAN / USA)	6.51–9.49; 8–9.49 (CAN / USA)
I	Intermediate	1,900–2,100	9.5–10.5
L	Long	2,101–2,700	10.51–13.5
E	Extended	2,701+	13.51+

International Code of Suffixes
The following countries have been represented in the WTR as foaling or training locations since the first edition in 2004.
ARG	Argentina	ITY	Italy
AUS	Australia	JPN	Japan
BRZ	Brazil	KSA	Saudi Arabia
CAN	Canada	NZ	New Zealand
CHI	Chile	SAF	South Africa
CZE	Czech Republic	SIN	Singapore
FR	France	SPA	Spain
GB	Great Britain	TUR	Turkey
GER	Germany	UAE	United Arab Emirates
HK	Hong Kong	USA	United States
HUN	Hungary	VEN	Venezuela
IRE	Ireland	ZIM	Zimbabwe

Shading
The shaded areas represent lesser ratings recorded by horses which were more highly rated in a different category. The IFHA publishes this information when the lower rating is the overall top performance in a particular category.
