= Mozu Ascot =

American-bred racehorse

Mozu Ascot; モズアスコット
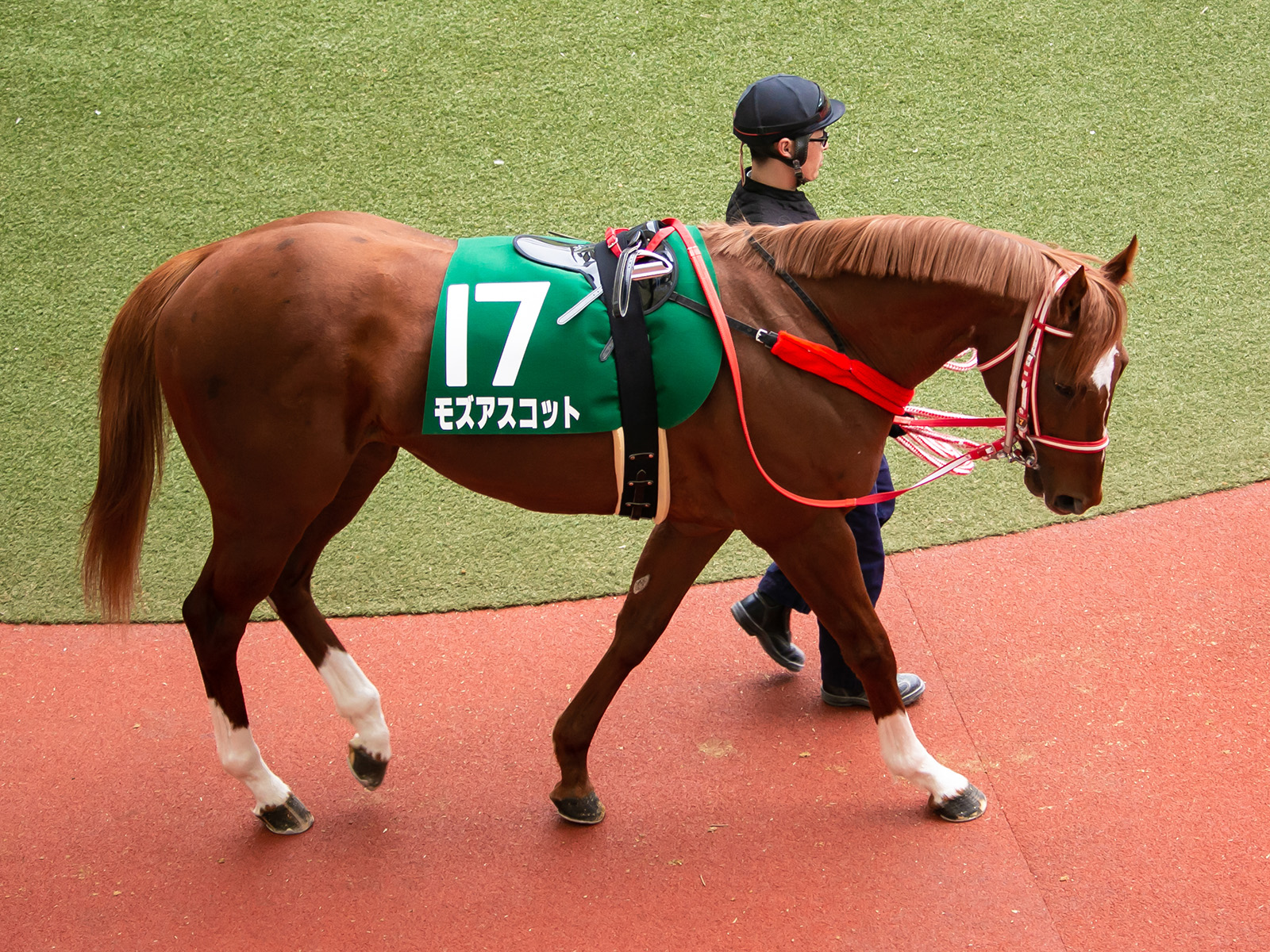
- Mozu Ascot in February 2018
- Sire: Frankel
- Grandsire: Galileo
- Dam: India
- Damsire: Hennessy
- Sex: Colt
- Foaled: 31 March 2014
- Country: United States
- Colour: Chestnut
- Breeder: Summer Wind Farm
- Owner: Capital System Co Ltd
- Racing colours
- Trainer: Yoshito Yahagi
- Jockey: Christophe Lemaire
- Record: 26: 7-6-0
- Earnings: ¥435,714,000

Major wins
- Yasuda Kinen (2018); Negishi Stakes (2020); February Stakes (2020)

Mozu Ascot (Japanese: モズアスコット, foaled 31 March 2014) is an American-bred Japanese-trained retired Thoroughbred racehorse and active sire who won Grade 1 races on turf and dirt. He did not race as a two-year-old in 2016 but in the following year he won four minor races. As a four-year-old he won the Yasuda Kinen as well as finishing second in the Hankyu Hai, Yomiuri Milers Cup and Swan Stakes. He failed to win in 2019 but returned to winning form when switched to race on dirt in 2020, taking the Negishi Stakes and the February Stakes. He was retired from racing at the end of the season.

== Background ==
Mozu Ascot is a chestnut with a white star and stripe and three white socks bred in Kentucky by the Summer Wind Farm. As a yearling in September 2015 he was put up for auction at the Keeneland Association sale but failed to reach his reserve price of $275,000. He was subsequently exported to Japan where he was sent into training with Yoshito Yahagi and carried the yellow and black colours of Capital System Co Ltd.

He was from the first crop of foals sired by Frankel, an undefeated racehorse whose other progeny have included Cracksman, Anapurna, Soul Stirring and Without Parole. Mozu Ascot's dam, the Kentucky-bred India, showed high-class racing ability earning over $600,000 and winning six races including the 2006 Cotillion Stakes. She was a great-great-granddaughter of the broodmare Golden Trail (foaled 1958) whose other descendants have included Brian's Time and Monarchos.

== Racing career ==
=== 2017: three-year-old season ===
Mozu Ascot was unraced as a two-year-old and began his track career on 10 June 2017 by finishing fourth in a maiden race over 2000 metres at Hanshin Racecourse and then came home fourth in a similar event over 1800 metres at the same venue two weeks later. The colt then ran up a four-race winning sequence, beginning with a victory in a 1600-metre maiden at Chukyo Racecourse in July. He returned from a two-month break and added to his tally by taking a minor race over the same distance at Hanshin in September, the Mitaka Tokubetsu over 1400 metres at Tokyo Racecourse on 11 November and the Togetsukyo Stakes at Kyoto Racecourse fifteen days later. For his final run of the season, Mozu Ascot was stepped up in class for the Grade 2 Hanshin Cup on 23 December. Ridden by Cristian Demuro he was made the 2.2/1 favourite but finished fourth behind the six-year-old Isla Bonita, beaten two and a half lengths by the winner.

In the official Japanese Thoroughbred rankings for 2017, Mozu Ascot was given a rating of 107, making him the 42nd best three-year-old on turf, fourteen pounds behind the top-rated Rey de Oro.

=== 2018: four-year-old season ===
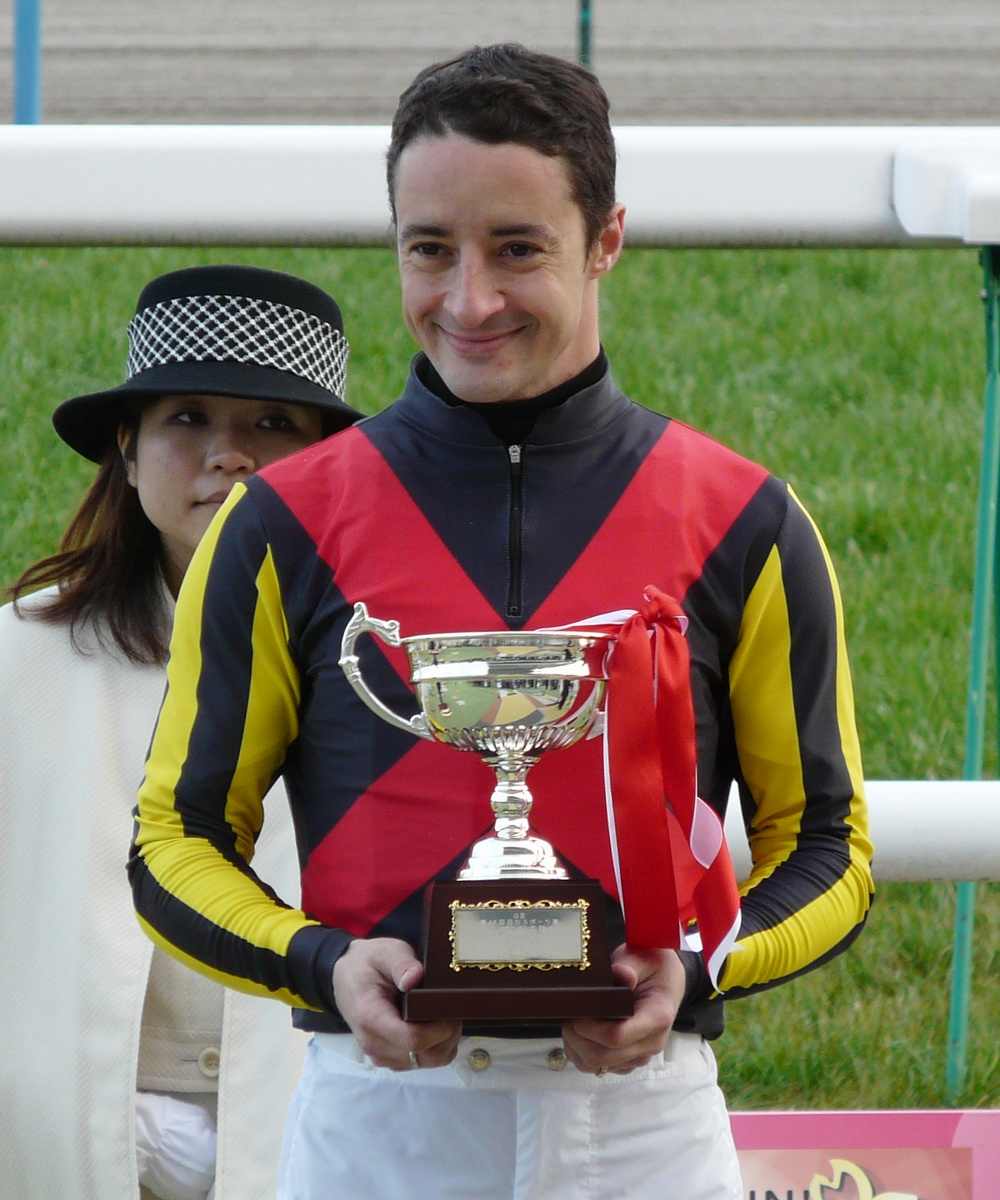
Mozu Ascot's regular jockey Christophe Lemaire

Christophe Lemaire was Mozu Ascot's regular jockey for the 2018 season which began on 25 February at Hanshin when the colt was beaten a neck by the five-year-old mare Diana Halo when favourite for the Grade 3 Hankyu Hai. In his next two starts he was runner-up to Sungrazer in the Grade 2 Yomiuri Milers Cup at Kyoto on 22 April and then ran second for the third time in a row when beaten by Daimei Fuji in the Listed Azuchijo Stakes over 1400 metres at the same track on 27 May. Commenting on the horse's losing run, Yahagi said "luck wasn’t on his side... there is no doubt that he has talent and potential... this colt is still just a kid even though he is maturing bit by bit".

On 3 June Mozu Ascot was moved up to Grade 1 level for the first time and started at odds of 14.7/1 for the 68th running of the Yasuda Kinen over 1600 metres at Tokyo. Suave Richard went off favourite while the other fourteen runners included Persian Knight (Mile Championship), Sungrazer, Real Steel, Aerolithe (NHK Mile Cup), Lys Gracieux, Satono Ares (Asahi Hai Futurity Stakes), Red Falx (Sprinters Stakes) and Reine Minoru (Oka Sho). Lemaire settled his mount in mid-division before dropping back towards the rear after being hampered and turning into the straight in twelfth place. Win Gagnant, who had set the pace for most of the way, faded in the straight and Aerolithe went to the front only to be challenged immediately by Suave Richard to her right and Satono Ares on the wide outside. Mozu Ascot however, having raced on the inside rail, angled to the right in the last 100 metres before threading his way through a gap between the leaders, overtaking Aerolithe in the final strides and winning by a neck. Lemaire commented "I didn't have any specific plan before the race... I also didn't plan whether to go inside or outside. As a result, the space became narrow, and we were bumped and pushed towards the inside. I didn't want him to lose his balance, so I waited... Once I found a gap, I asked for full power from the horse with my whip, and he responded very well and kept on strongly to the finish line".

After a break of well over four months Mozu Ascot returned on 27 October at Kyoto when he started odds-on favourite for the Swan Stakes but was beaten a nose by the five-year-old Lord Quest. Despite his defeat he was made the 2.4/1 favourite for the Grade 1 Mile Championship at the same track on 18 November but finished thirteenth of the eighteen runners, four lengths behind the winner Stelvio, after being unable to obtain a clear run in the straight. He ended his season on 9 December when he finished seventh behind Beauty Generation in the Hong Kong Mile at Sha Tin Racecourse.

In the 2018 World's Best Racehorse Rankings, Mozu Ascot was given a rating of 118, making him 78th best horse in the world.

=== 2019: five-year-old season ===
Mozu Ascot began his third campaign on 21 April when he ran seventh behind Danon Premium in the Yomiuri Milers Cup. His assistant trainer Shigeki Miyauchi said "he was too excitable, not like before. He's easily startled by noises". On 2 June he started at odds of 34/1 as he attempted to repeat his 2018 victory in the Yasuda Kinen and finished sixth of the sixteen runners behind Indy Champ beaten just over two lengths by the winner. After a four-month break he returned to the track at Tokyo in October and came home sixth behind Danon Kingly in the Mainichi Okan. Later that month he contested the Swan Stakes for the second time and, as in 2018 he was narrowly defeated, going down by a nose to the four-year-old favourite Diatonic. He ended his season in the Mile Championship on 17 November when he started a 18.9/1 outsider and finished fourteenth of the seventeen runners, beaten seven and a half lengths by the winner Indy Champ.

=== 2020: six-year-old season ===
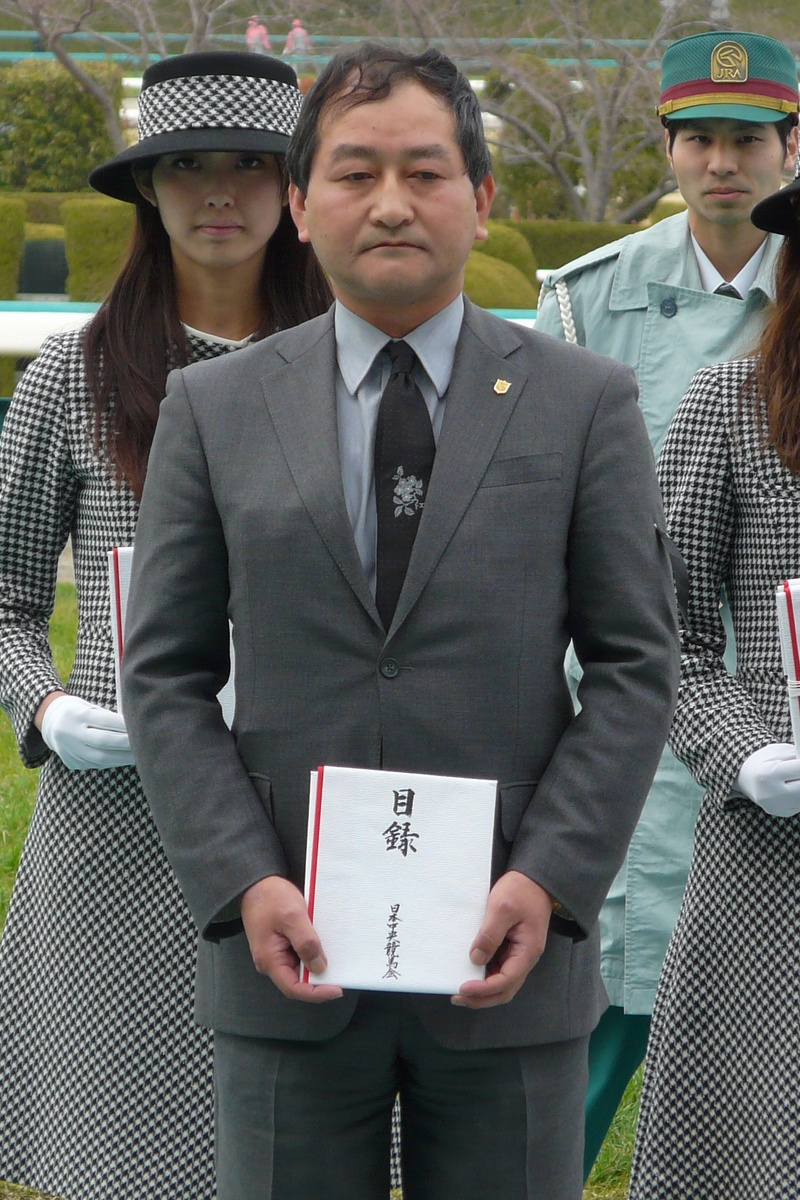
Mozu Ascot's trainer Yoshito Yahagi

Having raced on turf throughout his career, Mozu Ascot was switched to dirt at the start of 2020. He made his first appearance on the new surface in the Negishi Stakes over 1400 metres at Tokyo on 2 February and started at odds of 8.9/1 in a sixteen-runner field which also included Copano Kicking (winner of the race in 2019 and twice victorious in the Capella Stakes), Wide Pharaoh (Unicorn Stakes) and Wonder Lider (Musashino Stakes). Ridden by Lemaire, he produced a sustained run on the outside in the straight, caught Copano Kicking in the final strides, and won by one and a quarter lengths. Yahagi subsequently commented "It was a strong win for him, especially having to carry 58kg... he's a horse that needs a bit of care, as he has his own character".

Three weeks later Mozu Ascot contested his first Grade 1 on dirt when he started the 1.8/1 favourite for the February Stakes over 1600 metres at Tokyo. His fifteen opponents included Inti (winner of the race in 2019), Nonkono Yume (winner in 2018), Sunrise Nova (Unicorn Stakes, Musashino Stakes), Arctos (Procyon Stakes), Vengeance (Miyako Stakes), Time Flyer (Hopeful Stakes), Bulldog Boss (JBC Sprint), K T Brave (JBC Classic), Wide Pharaoh and Wonder Lider. After settling behind the leaders and turning into the straight in sixth place, Mozu Ascot made a forward move to take the lead 200 metres from the finish and drew away to win by two and a half lengths from K T Brave. After the race, Lemaire commented "He broke well and we were able to settle right behind Inti as planned. His acceleration was extraordinary. Although he is a newcomer in dirt racing, he adapted immediately to the surface and gave his best today".

Mozu Ascot was scheduled to contest the Doncaster Handicap in Australia but quarantine measures imposed after the COVID-19 outbreak meant that he remained in Japan and was dropped back to 1200 metres on turf for the Takamatsunomiya Kinen at Chukyo on 29 March. He raced towards the rear before making some progress in the straight but never looked likely to win and came home thirteenth of the eighteen runners behind Mozu Superflare. He returned to dirt for the Listed Kashiwa Kinen over 1600 metres at Funabashi Racecourse on 5 May when he finished sixth behind Wide Pharaoh.

After the summer break, Mozu Ascot returned in the Mile Championship Nambu Hai at the National Association of Racing's Morioka Racecourse and finished second to Arctos, beaten a neck by the winner. In the Musashino Stakes at Tokyo in November he started second favourite but came home seventh behind Sunrise Nova. On his final appearance, Mozu Ascot contested the Champions Cup at Chukyo on 6 December. After racing towards the rear of the field, he made strong progress in the straight but was unable to reach the leaders and finished fifth to Chuwa Wizard.

== Racing form ==
Mozu Ascot won seven races and finished in second place six times out of 26 starts. This data is available based on JBIS, netkeiba and HKJC.

Date	Track	Race	Grade	Distance (Condition)	Entry	HN	Odds (Favored)	Finish	Time	Margins	Jockey	Winner (Runner-up)
2017 – three-year-old season
Jun 10	Hanshin	3yo Newcomer		2,000 m (Firm)	16	7	2.6 (1)	4th	2:00.6	0.0	Yutaka Take	Admire Arrow
Jun 24	Hanshin	3yo Maiden		1,800 m (Firm)	18	6	2.1 (1)	4th	1:46.9	0.2	Yutaka Take	Candy Storm
Jul 16	Chukyo	3yo Maiden		1,600 m (Firm)	16	6	3.3 (2)	1st	1:34.6	–0.3	Hiroyuki Uchida	(Tornado Alley)
Sep 24	Hanshin	3yo+ Allowance	1W	1,600 m (Firm)	18	17	3.7 (2)	1st	1:32.7	–0.6	Christophe Lemaire	(Cath Palug)
Nov 11	Tokyo	Mitaka Tokubetsu	ALW (2W)	1,400 m (Firm)	15	5	1.5 (1)	1st	1:20.4	–0.2	Christophe Lemaire	(Baris)
Nov 26	Kyoto	Togetsukyo Stakes	ALW (3W)	1,400 m (Firm)	15	15	1.9 (1)	1st	1:21.5	–0.3	Hiroto Yoshihara	(Climb Major)
Dec 23	Hanshin	Hanshin Cup	2	1,400 m (Firm)	18	7	3.2 (1)	4th	1:19.9	0.4	Cristian Demuro	Isla Bonita
2018 – four-year-old season
Feb 25	Hanshin	Hankyu Hai	3	1,400 m (Firm)	18	17	2.6 (1)	2nd	1:20.1	0.0	Christophe Lemaire	Diana Halo
Apr 22	Kyoto	Yomiuri Milers Cup	2	1,600 m (Firm)	14	9	3.5 (2)	2nd	1:31.5	0.2	Christophe Lemaire	Sungrazer
May 27	Kyoto	Azuchijo Stakes	OP	1,400 m (Firm)	17	1	1.5 (1)	2nd	1:20.7	0.0	Ryusei Sakai	Daimei Fuji
Jun 3	Tokyo	Yasuda Kinen	1	1,600 m (Firm)	16	10	15.7 (9)	1st	1:31.3	0.0	Christophe Lemaire	(Aerolithe)
Oct 27	Kyoto	Swan Stakes	2	1,400 m (Firm)	11	10	1.3 (1)	2nd	1:21.5	0.0	Christophe Lemaire	Lord Quest
Nov 18	Kyoto	Mile Championship	1	1,600 m (Firm)	18	8	3.4 (1)	13th	1:33.8	0.5	Christophe Lemaire	Stelvio
Dec 9	Sha Tin	Hong Kong Mile	1	1,600 m (Firm)	14	4	6.8 (3)	7th	1:34.4	0.9	Christophe Lemaire	Beauty Generation
2019 – five-year-old season
Apr 21	Kyoto	Yomiuri Milers Cup	2	1,600 m (Firm)	10	4	9.9 (3)	7th	1:33.6	1.0	Christophe Lemaire	Danon Premium
Jun 2	Tokyo	Yasuda Kinen	1	1,600 m (Firm)	16	7	35.4 (7)	6th	1:31.2	0.3	Ryusei Sakai	Indy Champ
Oct 6	Tokyo	Mainichi Okan	2	1,800 m (Firm)	10	10	22.5 (5)	6th	1:45.0	0.6	Hiroyuki Uchida	Danon Kingly
Oct 26	Kyoto	Swan Stakes	2	1,400 m (Good)	18	10	4.4 (2)	2nd	1:21.3	0.0	Yasunari Iwata	Diatonic
Nov 17	Kyoto	Mile Championship	1	1,600 m (Firm)	17	12	19.9 (7)	14th	1:34.2	1.2	Ryuji Wada	Indy Champ
2020 – six-year-old season
Feb 2	Tokyo	Negishi Stakes	3	1,400 m (Fast)	16	11	9.9 (3)	1st	1:22.7	–0.2	Christophe Lemaire	(Copano Kicking)
Feb 23	Tokyo	February Stakes	1	1,600 m (Fast)	16	12	2.8 (1)	1st	1:35.2	–0.4	Christophe Lemaire	(K T Brave)
Mar 29	Chukyo	Takamatsunomiya Kinen	1	1,200 m (Soft)	18	14	9.8 (5)	13th	1:09.9	1.2	Mirco Demuro	Mozu Superflare
May 5	Funabashi	Kashiwa Kinen	JPN 1	1,600 m (Fast)	7	5	2.2 (1)	6th	1:40.5	1.9	Christophe Lemaire	Wide Pharaoh
Oct 12	Morioka	Mile Championship Nambu Hai	JPN 1	1,600 m (Good)	16	5	4.7 (2)	2nd	1:32.8	0.1	Takeshi Yokoyama	Arctos
Nov 14	Tokyo	Musashino Stakes	3	1,600 m (Fast)	16	2	4.8 (2)	7th	1:35.9	0.9	Takeshi Yokoyama	Sunrise Nova
Dec 6	Chukyo	Champions Cup	1	1,800 m (Fast)	16	12	67.9 (11)	5th	1:50.0	0.7	Takeshi Yokoyama	Chuwa Wizard

Legend:
Turf Dirt

- JPN graded races was labeled as Listed internationally.

== Stud career ==
Mozu Ascot was retired from racing at the end of 2020, and began his career as a breeding stallion at the Arrow Stud.

=== Notable progeny ===
Below data is based on JBIS Stallion Reports.

c = colt, f = filly

bold = grade 1 stakes

**Foaled**	**Name**	**Sex**	**Major Wins**
2022	Faust Rasen	c	Yayoi Sho, Hakodate Kinen
2023	Ecoro Alba	c	Saudi Arabia Royal Cup

== Pedigree ==
Pedigree of Mozu Ascot (USA), chestnut horse, 2014
Sire Frankel (GB) 2008	Galileo (IRE); 1998	Sadler's Wells (USA)	Northern Dancer (CAN)
Sire Frankel (GB) 2008	Galileo (IRE); 1998	Sadler's Wells (USA)	Fairy Bridge
Sire Frankel (GB) 2008	Galileo (IRE); 1998	Urban Sea (USA)	**Miswaki**
Sire Frankel (GB) 2008	Galileo (IRE); 1998	Urban Sea (USA)	Allegretta (GB)
Sire Frankel (GB) 2008	Kind (IRE); 2001	Danehill (USA)	Danzig
Sire Frankel (GB) 2008	Kind (IRE); 2001	Danehill (USA)	Razyana
Sire Frankel (GB) 2008	Kind (IRE); 2001	Rainbow Lake (GB)	Rainbow Quest (USA)
Sire Frankel (GB) 2008	Kind (IRE); 2001	Rainbow Lake (GB)	Rockfest (USA)
Dam India (USA) 2003	Hennessy (USA); 1993	Storm Cat	Storm Bird (CAN)
Dam India (USA) 2003	Hennessy (USA); 1993	Storm Cat	Terlingua
Dam India (USA) 2003	Hennessy (USA); 1993	Island Kitty	Hawaii (SAF)
Dam India (USA) 2003	Hennessy (USA); 1993	Island Kitty	T C Kitten
Dam India (USA) 2003	Misty Hour (USA); 1995	**Miswaki**	Mr. Prospector
Dam India (USA) 2003	Misty Hour (USA); 1995	**Miswaki**	Hopespringseternal
Dam India (USA) 2003	Misty Hour (USA); 1995	Our Tina Marie	Nijinsky (CAN)
Dam India (USA) 2003	Misty Hour (USA); 1995	Our Tina Marie	Java Moon (Family: 4-r)

- Mozu Ascot was inbred 3 × 4 to Miswaki, meaning that this stallion appears in both the third and fourth generations of his pedigree.
