= Win Bright =

Japanese Thoroughbred racehorse

Win Bright; ウインブライト
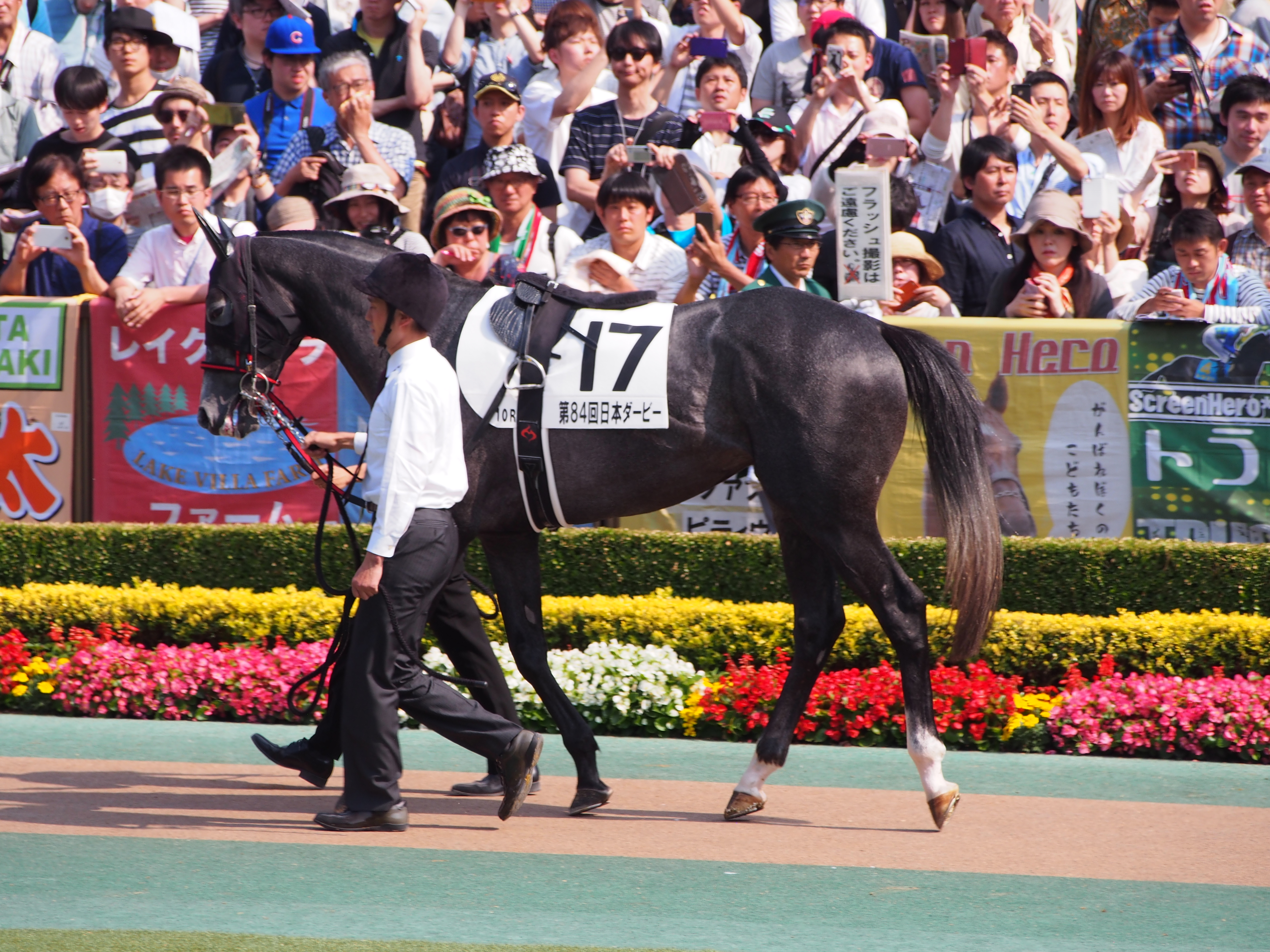
- Win Bright in 2017
- Sire: Stay Gold
- Grandsire: Sunday Silence
- Dam: Summer Eternity
- Damsire: Admire Cozzene
- Sex: Colt
- Foaled: 12 May 2014
- Country: Japan
- Colour: Grey
- Breeder: Cosmo View Farm
- Owner: Win Co Ltd
- Racing colours
- Trainer: Yoshihiro Hatakeyama
- Jockey: Masami Matsuoka
- Record: 24: 9-3-0
- Earnings: ¥792,063,000 ¥299,523,000 in Japan ¥492,540,000 in Hong Kong

Major wins
- Spring Stakes (2017); Fukushima Kinen (2017); Nakayama Kinen (2018, 2019); Nakayama Kimpai (2019); Queen Elizabeth II Cup (2019); Hong Kong Cup (2019)

Awards
- JRA Award for Best Older Male Horse (2019)

Win Bright (Japanese: ウインブライト, foaled 12 May 2014) is a Japanese Thoroughbred racehorse best known for his performances in Hong Kong. He showed good early form, winning once as a juvenile and taking the Spring Stakes and Fukushima Kinen in the following year. As a four-year-old he added a win over a strong field in the Nakayama Kinen but the rest of his form was unremarkable. He reached his peak as a five-year-old in 2019 when he won the Nakayama Kimpai and a second Nakayama Kinen before capturing the Queen Elizabeth II Cup at Sha Tin Racecourse. In December he returned to Hong Kong and recorded a second major victory as he won the Hong Kong Cup. He failed to win in 2020 but finished second in the Hong Kong Cup.

== Background ==
Win Bright is a grey horse bred in Japan by Cosmo View Farm. During his racing career he was trained by Yoshihiro Hatakeyama and raced in the black, white and red colours of Win Co Ltd. He had a white blaze and white socks on his hind legs but these markings became less visible as his coat lightened. Masami Matsuoka rode Win Bright in most of his races.

He was from the eleventh crop of foals sired by Stay Gold, a horse whose wins included the Dubai Sheema Classic and Hong Kong Vase in 2001. He went on to sire many major winners including Orfevre, Gold Ship, Nakayama Festa, Rainbow Line and Fenomeno. Win Bright's dam Summer Eternity, from whom he inherited his colour, won three minor races in four seasons on the track between 2007 and 2010. Her grand-dam Miss Guelain was a half-sister to the dam of the Yushun Himba winner Cosmo Dream.

== Racing career ==
=== 2016: two-year-old season ===
Win Bright began his racing career by finishing sixth in a contest for previously unraced juveniles over 1800 metres at Tokyo Racecourse on 26 June and then ran fifth in a maiden race over the same distance at Fukushima Racecourse four weeks later. At Tokyo on 12 November the colt recorded his first success when he won a maiden from Meiner Raptis and eleven others. On his final run of the year he finished second to Outliers in a minor race over 1600 metres at Nakayama Racecourse in December.

=== 2017: three-year-old season ===
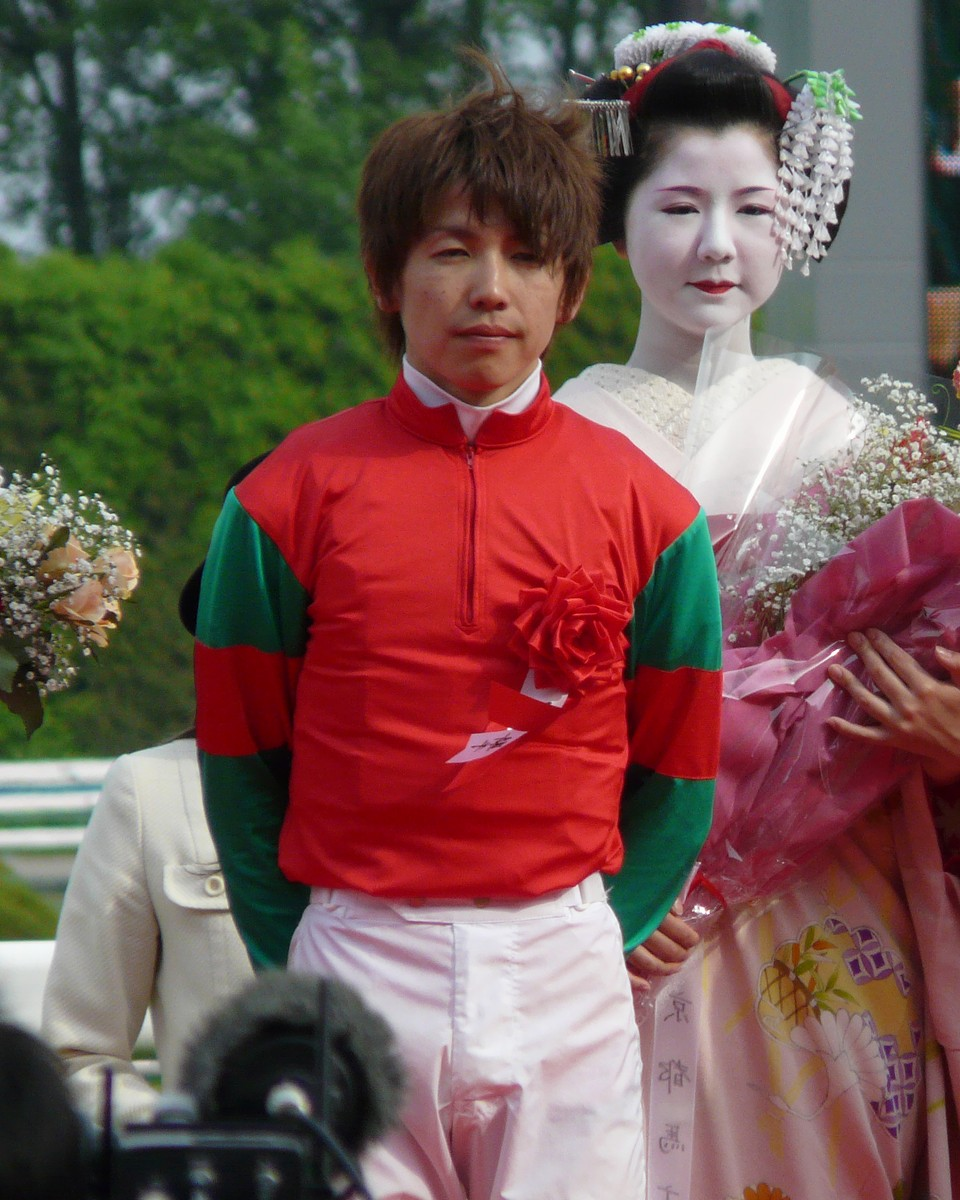
Win Bright's regular jockey Masami Matsuoka

On his three-year-old debut Win Bright won the Wakatake Sho over 1800 metres at Nakayama on 21 January. He was then stepped up in class for the Spring Stakes (a major trial race for the Grade 2 Satsuki Sho) over the same course and distance on 19 March and started the 8.1/1 fourth choice in the betting behind Satono Ares (winner of the Asahi Hai Futurity Stakes), Outliers, Tricolore Bleu and Monde Can Know. After being settled towards the rear by Matsuoka he was switched to the outside in the straight and produced a sustained run to take the lead in last 100 metres and win by half a length from Outliers. In the Shūka Sho over 2000 metres at the same track he started slowly, and never looked likely to win despite making late progress on the outside, coming home eighth of the eighteen runners behind Al Ain. Win Bright was then stepped up in distance to contest the 2400 Tokyo Yushun on 28 May, starting as a 133/1 outsider and finishing towards the rear behind Rey de Oro after fading in the closing stages.

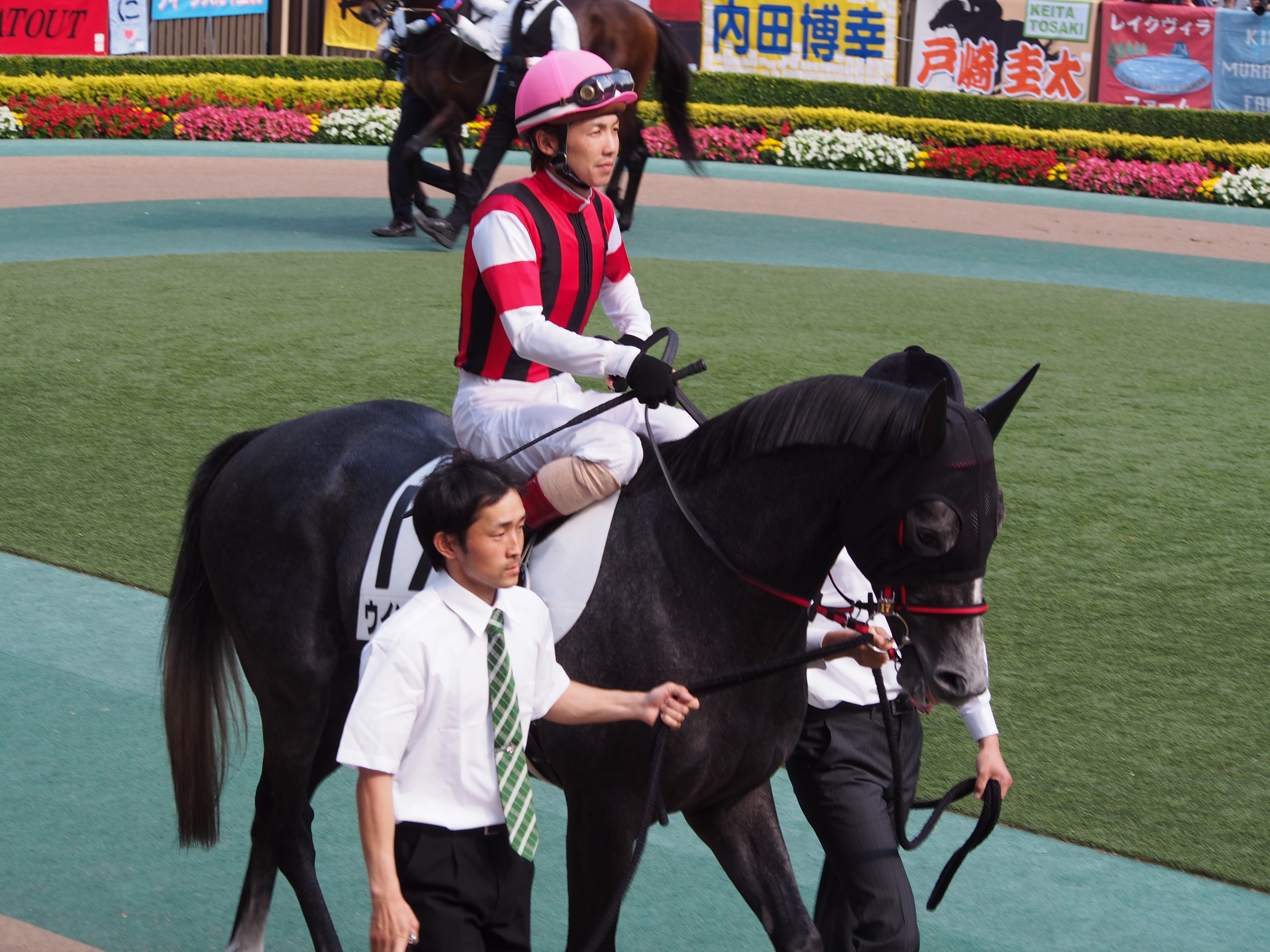
Win Bright with Masami Matsuoka at the 2017 Tokyo Yushun paddock

After a break of over four months, Win Bright was matched against older horses in the Grade 2 Mainichi Okan over 1800 metres at Tokyo and finished tenth of the twelve runners behind Real Steel. On his final run of the year the colt started the 4.4/1 second favourite for the Group 3 Fukushima Kinen on 12 November. After racing in third place for most of the way, Win Bright went to the front early in the straight and held on to win by a neck from the six-year-old Suzuka Devious.

=== 2018: four-year-old season ===
Win Bright's third campaign began at Nakayama on 6 January 2018 when he was beaten a neck into second place by the favoured Seda Brillantes in the Grade 3 Nakayama Kimpai. At the same track on 25 February he contested the Grade 2 Nakayama Kinen and started at 4.3/1 in a ten-runner field which also included the Grade 1 winners Persian Knight (Mile Championship), Aerolithe (NHK Mile Cup) and Vivlos. After racing in mid-division, Win Bright made a forward move approaching the final turn, overtook the front-running Maltese Apogee in the straight, and held off the late challenge of Aerolithe to win by a neck.

Win Bright was then moved up to Grade 1 class for the Osaka Hai at Hanshin Racecourse on 1 April but never looked likely to win and finished unplaced behind Suave Richard. He returned to the track in autumn but failed to reproduce his best form in two races, finishing tenth to Logi Cry in the Fuji Stakes at Tokyo in October, and ninth to Stelvio in the Mile Championship at Kyoto Racecourse in November.

=== 2019: five-year-old season ===
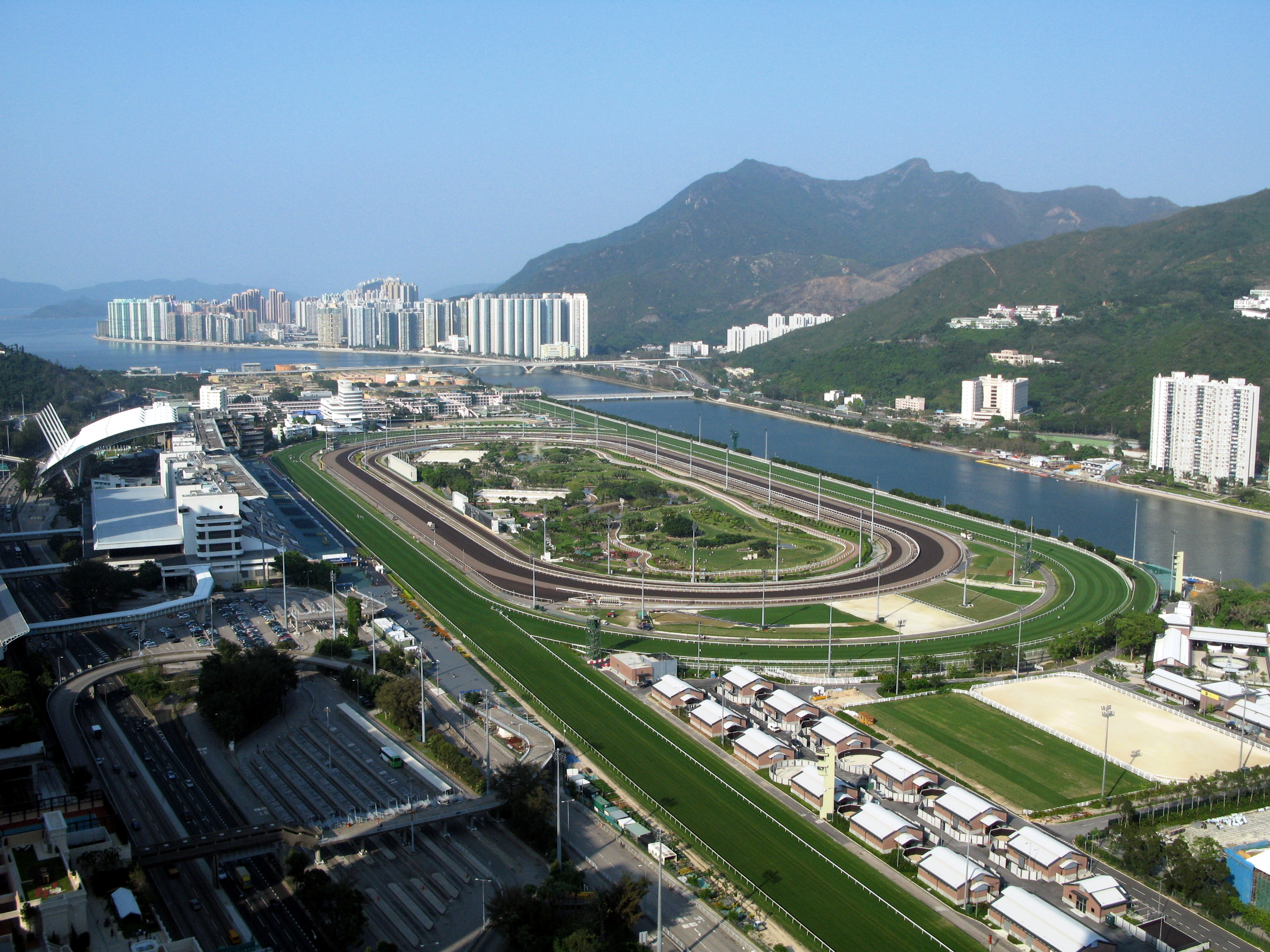
Sha Tin Racecourse, where Win Bright recorded his two biggest victories in 2019

As in the previous year, Win Bright began his season in the Nakayama Kimpai and went one better than in 2018 as came with a strong late run on the outside to take the lead inside the last 100 metres and won by half a length from Stay Foolish at odds of 7.4/1. In the following month he started at odds of 6/1 as he attempted to repeat his 2018 success in the Nakayama Kinen, facing ten rivals including Deirdre, Lucky Lilac, Epoca d'Oro, Stelvio and Suave Richard. After racing in fourth place for most of the way Win Bright stayed on strongly in the straight and won by a neck and a head from Lucky Lilac and Stelvio.

For his next start Win Bright joined Lys Gracieux and Deirdre in a three-horse Japanese challenge for the Grade 1 Queen Elizabeth II Cup over 2000 metres at Sha Tin Racecourse in Hong Kong and started a 47/1 outsider in a thirteen-runner field. The home contingent included Exultant (Hong Kong Vase), Glorious Forever (2018 Hong Kong Cup), Pakistan Star (winner of the race in 2018) and Time Warp (2017 Hong Kong Cup). After starting slowly Win Bright settled in mid-division on the inside as Time Warp set the pace from Glorious Forever, before making a forward move on the final turn. He briefly struggled to obtain a clear run in the straight but overtook Pakistan Star 100 metres from the finish and won by three quarters of a length from Exultant and Lys Gracieux. Matsuoka, who was recording his first Grade 1 win in ten years, commented "We didn't get off to a good start but we still managed to travel in the position we wanted to and everything worked out in the end. It turned out to be a fabulous day."

When Win Bright returned to the track in autumn he ran disappointingly in the Sankei Sho All Comers at Nakayama in September and then finished unplaced when starting a 148/1 outsider for the autumn edition of the Tenno Sho at Tokyo a month later. On 8 December the horse returned to Sha Tin for the Hong Kong Cup and started the 4.4/1 third choice in the betting behind the locally trained duo Furore (Hong Kong Derby) and Rise High (Sha Tin Trophy). The other five runners included Magic Wand from Ireland (Mackinnon Stakes), Edisa from France, Glorious Forever, Time Warp and Dark Dream. Win Bright settled behind the leaders took the lead 150 metres from the finish and held off the late challenge of Magic Wand to win by a nose. After the race Matsuoka said "It was very, very good because his last two starts were not first-three performances but the horse's condition has been going up since he got here so were very happy. We had a very good day here in April so it was very memorable to come here. Sha Tin suits the horse very well because he likes the right-handed course in Japan, so it is very suitable".

In January 2020, at the JRA Awards for 2019, Win Bright was voted Best Older Male Horse, beating fellow Stay Gold progeny Indy Champ by 136 votes to 118.

=== 2020: six-year-old season ===
Win Bright began his 2020 season by running seventh behind Danon Kingly in the Nakayama Kinen on 1 March. Plans to campaign the horse in Dubai and Hong Kong later that spring had to be abandoned because of the COVID-19 pandemic. He was then aimed at the Takarazuka Kinen but developed a hoof problem and was off the track until the autumn.

Win Bright returned to competition in the autumn edition of the Tenno Sho at Tokyo on 1 November when he started a 180/1 outsider and came home tenth of the twelve runners behind Almond Eye. On 13 December Win Bright attempted to repeat his 2019 success in the Hong Kong Cup and went off the 9/1 fifth choice in an eight-runner field. He raced in mid-division before making progress in the straight and recovered from being hampered 400 metres from the finish to take second place behind Normcore. Yoshihiro Hatakeyama said, "It was unfortunate, as the horse really gave it his all. The jockey, like he did last year, gave him a ride that allowed for no complaints and one that brought out the horse’s very best. The result come down to the fact that winner ran a very good race and was stronger. This year has been anything but normal, but this horse gave, as his last race, a race that was very much him. The breeder, owner and jockey all worked together as a team and gave him an experience that’s not easy to have. I take my hat off to everyone."

In the 2020 World's Best Racehorse Rankings, Win Bright was rated on 119, making him the equal 57th best racehorse in the world.

== Racing form ==
Win Bright won nine races and finished in second place three times out of 24 starts. This data is available in JBIS, netkeiba and HKJC.

Date	Track	Race	Grade	Distance (Condition)	Entry	HN	Odds (Favored)	Finish	Time	Margins	Jockey	Winner (Runner-up)
2016 – two-year-old season
Jun 26	Tokyo	2yo Newcomer		1,800 m (Firm)	13	10	2.1 (1)	6th	1:51.6	0.8	Masami Matsuoka	Nishino Apple Pie
Jul 24	Fukushima	2yo Maiden		1,800 m (Firm)	15	14	4.0 (2)	5th	1:51.4	0.4	Hiroyuki Uchida	Flower Premiere
Nov 12	Tokyo	2yo Maiden		1,800 m (Good)	13	8	8.7 (4)	1st	1:49.2	–0.2	Masami Matsuoka	(Meiner Raptis)
Dec 17	Nakayama	Hiiragi Sho	ALW (1W)	1,600 m (Firm)	13	9	13.4 (4)	2nd	1:35.0	0.2	Masami Matsuoka	Outliers
2017 – three-year-old season
Jan 21	Nakayama	Wakatake Sho	ALW (1W)	1,800 m (Firm)	14	12	1.9 (1)	1st	1:48.3	–0.3	Masami Matsuoka	(Meiner Sieger)
Mar 19	Nakayama	Spring Stakes	2	1,800 m (Firm)	11	10	8.1 (5)	1st	1:48.4	–0.1	Masami Matsuoka	(Outliers)
Apr 19	Nakayama	Satsuki Sho	1	2,000 m (Firm)	18	17	14.7 (6)	8th	1:58.3	0.5	Masami Matsuoka	Al Ain
May 28	Tokyo	Tokyo Yushun	1	2,400 m (Firm)	18	17	133.6 (12)	15th	2:28.4	1.5	Masami Matsuoka	Rey de Oro
Oct 8	Tokyo	Mainichi Okan	2	1,800 m (Firm)	12	11	87.3 (9)	10th	1:46.2	0.6	Masami Matsuoka	Real Steel
Nov 12	Fukushima	Fukushima Kinen	3	2,000 m (Firm)	15	3	5.4 (2)	1st	2:00.2	0.0	Masami Matsuoka	(Suzuka Devious)
2018 – four-year-old season
Jan 6	Nakayama	Nakayama Kimpai	3	2,000 m (Firm)	17	1	4.9 (2)	2nd	1:59.8	0.0	Masami Matsuoka	Seda Brillantes
Feb 25	Nakayama	Nakayama Kinen	2	1,800 m (Firm)	10	5	5.3 (2)	1st	1:47.6	0.0	Masami Matsuoka	(Aerolithe)
Apr 1	Hanshin	Osaka Hai	1	2,000 m (Firm)	16	11	37.0 (9)	12th	1:59.7	1.5	Masami Matsuoka	Suave Richard
Oct 20	Tokyo	Fuji Stakes	3	1,600 m (Firm)	18	4	53.1 (10)	10th	1:32.5	0.8	Masami Matsuoka	Logi Cry
Nov 18	Kyoto	Mile Championship	1	1,600 m (Firm)	18	9	209.4 (14)	9th	1:33.7	0.4	Masami Matsuoka	Stelvio
2019 – five-year-old season
Jan 5	Nakayama	Nakayama Kimpai	3	2,000 m (Firm)	16	11	8.4 (3)	1st	1:59.2	–0.1	Masami Matsuoka	(Stay Foolish)
Feb 24	Nakayama	Nakayama Kinen	2	1,800 m (Firm)	11	1	7.0 (5)	1st	1:45.5	0.0	Masami Matsuoka	(Lucky Lilac)
Apr 28	Sha Tin	Queen Elizabeth II Cup	1	2,000 m (Firm)	13	4	8.5 (4)	1st	R1:58.8	–0.2	Masami Matsuoka	(Exultant)
Sep 22	Nakayama	Sankei Sho All Comers	2	2,200 m (Firm)	10	7	3.0 (2)	9th	2:13.5	1.5	Masami Matsuoka	Stiffelio
Oct 27	Tokyo	Tenno Sho (Autumn)	1	2,000 m (Firm)	16	15	148.9 (12)	8th	1:57.3	1.1	Masami Matsuoka	Almond Eye
Dec 8	Sha Tin	Hong Kong Cup	1	2,000 m (Firm)	8	1	3.3 (1)	1st	2:00.5	0.0	Masami Matsuoka	(Magic Wand)
2020 – six-year-old season
Mar 1	Nakayama	Nakayama Kinen	2	1,800 m (Firm)	9	8	5.1 (3)	7th	1:47.2	0.9	Filip Minarik	Danon Kingly
Nov 1	Tokyo	Tenno Sho (Autumn)	1	2,000 m (Firm)	12	5	180.6 (12)	10th	1:59.4	1.6	Masami Matsuoka	Almond Eye
Dec 13	Sha Tin	Hong Kong Cup	1	2,000 m (Firm)	8	3	5.1 (3)	2nd	2:00.6	0.1	Masami Matsuoka	Normcore

Legend:
Turf

- R indicated that it was a record finish time.

== Stud career ==
After his retirement from racing, Win Bright became a breeding stallion at the Big Red Farm in Hokkaido.

== Pedigree ==
Pedigree of Win Bright (JPN), grey stallion, 2014
Sire Stay Gold (JPN) 1994	Sunday Silence (USA); 1986	Halo	Hail To Reason
Sire Stay Gold (JPN) 1994	Sunday Silence (USA); 1986	Halo	Cosmah
Sire Stay Gold (JPN) 1994	Sunday Silence (USA); 1986	Wishing Well	Understanding
Sire Stay Gold (JPN) 1994	Sunday Silence (USA); 1986	Wishing Well	Mountain Flower
Sire Stay Gold (JPN) 1994	Golden Sash (JPN); 1988	Dictus (FR)	Sanctus
Sire Stay Gold (JPN) 1994	Golden Sash (JPN); 1988	Dictus (FR)	Doronic
Sire Stay Gold (JPN) 1994	Golden Sash (JPN); 1988	Dyna Sash	Northern Taste (CAN)
Sire Stay Gold (JPN) 1994	Golden Sash (JPN); 1988	Dyna Sash	Royal Sash (GB)
Dam Summer Eternity (JPN) 2005	Admire Cozzene (JPN); 1996	Cozzene (USA)	Caro (IRE)
Dam Summer Eternity (JPN) 2005	Admire Cozzene (JPN); 1996	Cozzene (USA)	Ride The Trails
Dam Summer Eternity (JPN) 2005	Admire Cozzene (JPN); 1996	Admire Mcardy	Northern Taste (CAN)
Dam Summer Eternity (JPN) 2005	Admire Cozzene (JPN); 1996	Admire Mcardy	Mrs McArdy (GB)
Dam Summer Eternity (JPN) 2005	All For Guelain (JPN); 1993	Jade Robbery (USA)	Mr. Prospector
Dam Summer Eternity (JPN) 2005	All For Guelain (JPN); 1993	Jade Robbery (USA)	Number
Dam Summer Eternity (JPN) 2005	All For Guelain (JPN); 1993	Miss Guelain	Maruzensky
Dam Summer Eternity (JPN) 2005	All For Guelain (JPN); 1993	Miss Guelain	Guerlain (Family: 18)

- Win Bright was inbred 4 × 4 to Northern Taste, meaning that this stallion appears twice in the fourth generation of his pedigree.
