= Suave Richard =

Japanese Thoroughbred racehorse

Suave Richard; スワーヴリチャード
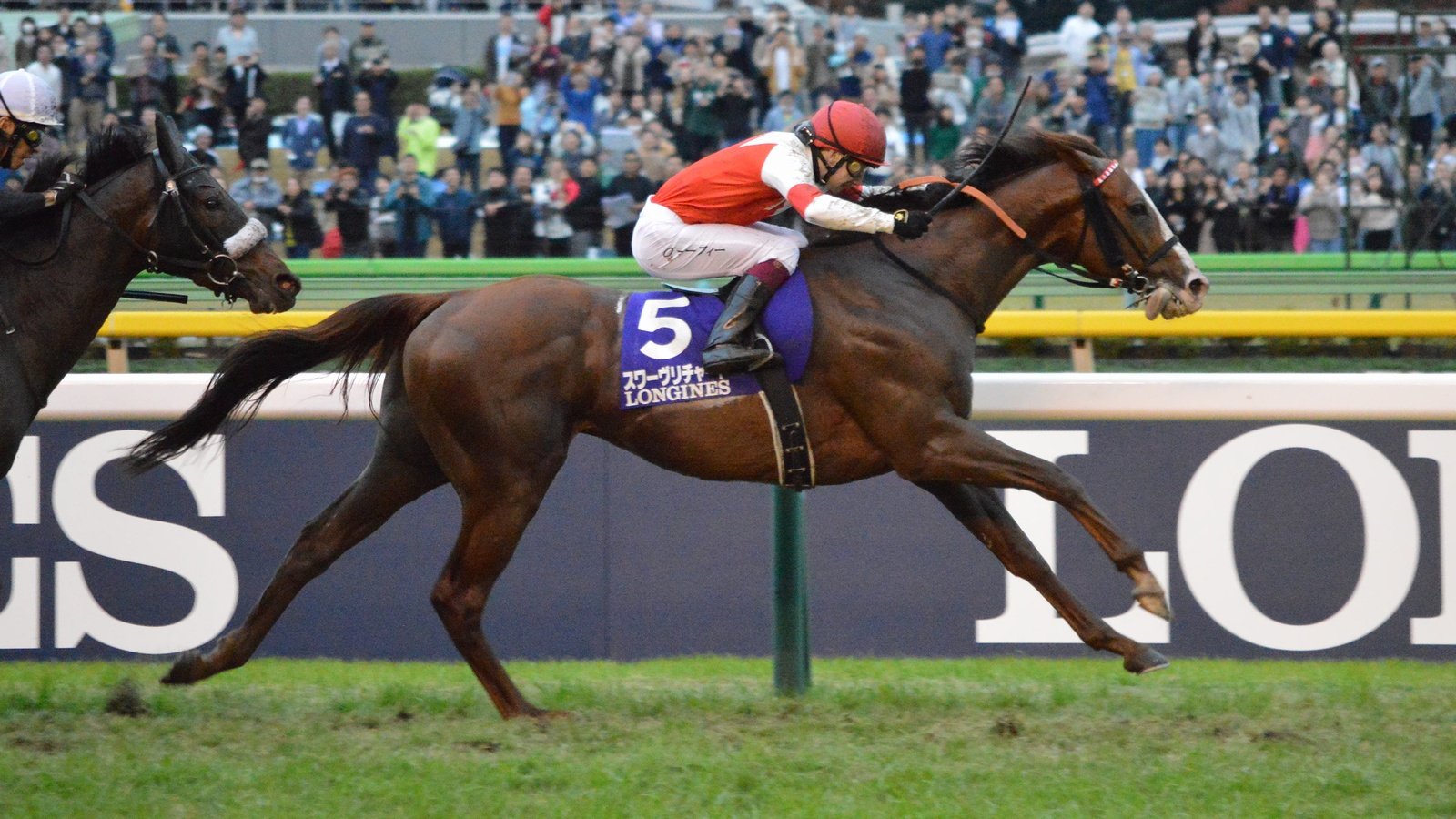
- 2019 Japan Cup
- Sire: Heart's Cry
- Grandsire: Sunday Silence
- Dam: Pirramimma
- Damsire: Unbridled's Song
- Sex: Stallion
- Foaled: 10 March 2014
- Country: Japan
- Colour: Chestnut
- Breeder: Northern Farm
- Owner: NICKS co ltd
- Racing colours
- Trainer: Yasushi Shono
- Jockey: Mirco Demuro; Oisin Murphy
- Record: 19: 6-3-4
- Earnings: ¥891,324,000

Major wins
- Kyodo Tsushin Hai (2017); Copa Republica Argentina (2017); Kinko Sho (2018); Osaka Hai (2018); Japan Cup (2019)

Suave Richard (Japanese: スワーヴリチャード, foaled 10 March 2014) is a Japanese retired Thoroughbred racehorse best known for winning the 2019 Japan Cup. He showed promising form as a juvenile in 2016 when he won one of his three races and finished second in the Tokyo Sports Hai Nisai Stakes. In the following year he was one of the best colts of his generation in Japan, winning the Kyodo Tsushin Hai and the Copa Republica Argentina and running second in the Tokyo Yushun. As a four-year-old he won the Kinko Sho and the Grade 1 Osaka Hai as well as taking third place in both the Yasuda Kinen and the Japan Cup. In 2019 he finished third in the Dubai Sheema Classic and the Takarazuka Kinen and won the Japan Cup at Tokyo Racecourse in November.

== Background ==
Suave Richard is a chestnut horse with a broad white blaze bred in Japan by Northern Farm. As a foal in 2014 he was consigned to the Japan Racing Horse Association Select sale and was bought for ¥167,400,000 by MMB Co Ltd. He raced in the red and white colours of NICKS Co Ltd and was trained by Yasushi Shono.

He was from the seventh crop of foals sired by Heart's Cry, whose wins included the Arima Kinen and the Dubai Sheema Classic. His other foals have included Admire Rakti, Just A Way, Lys Gracieux, and Do Deuce.

Suave Richard's dam Pirramimma was a Kentucky-bred mare who was imported to Japan where she demonstrated no racing ability, finishing unplaced in her two track appearances. She was a female-line descendant of Star Fortune, a half-sister to Beldale Flutter.

== Racing career ==
=== 2016: two-year-old season ===
On 11 September, at Hanshin Racecourse, Suave Richard began his racing career by finishing second to Meliora in a 2000 metres contest for previously unraced juveniles. Three weeks later, he recorded his first victory when he won a maiden race over the same course and distance. On 19 November, he stepped up in class for the Grade 3 Tokyo Sports Hai Nisai Stakes over 1800 metres at Tokyo Racecourse when he started at odds of 7.1/1 and finished second, beaten a neck by Bless Journey.

In the official Japanese rankings for 2016, Suave Richard was rated the fifth-best two-year-old colt, four pounds behind the top-rated Satono Ares.

=== 2017: three-year-old season ===
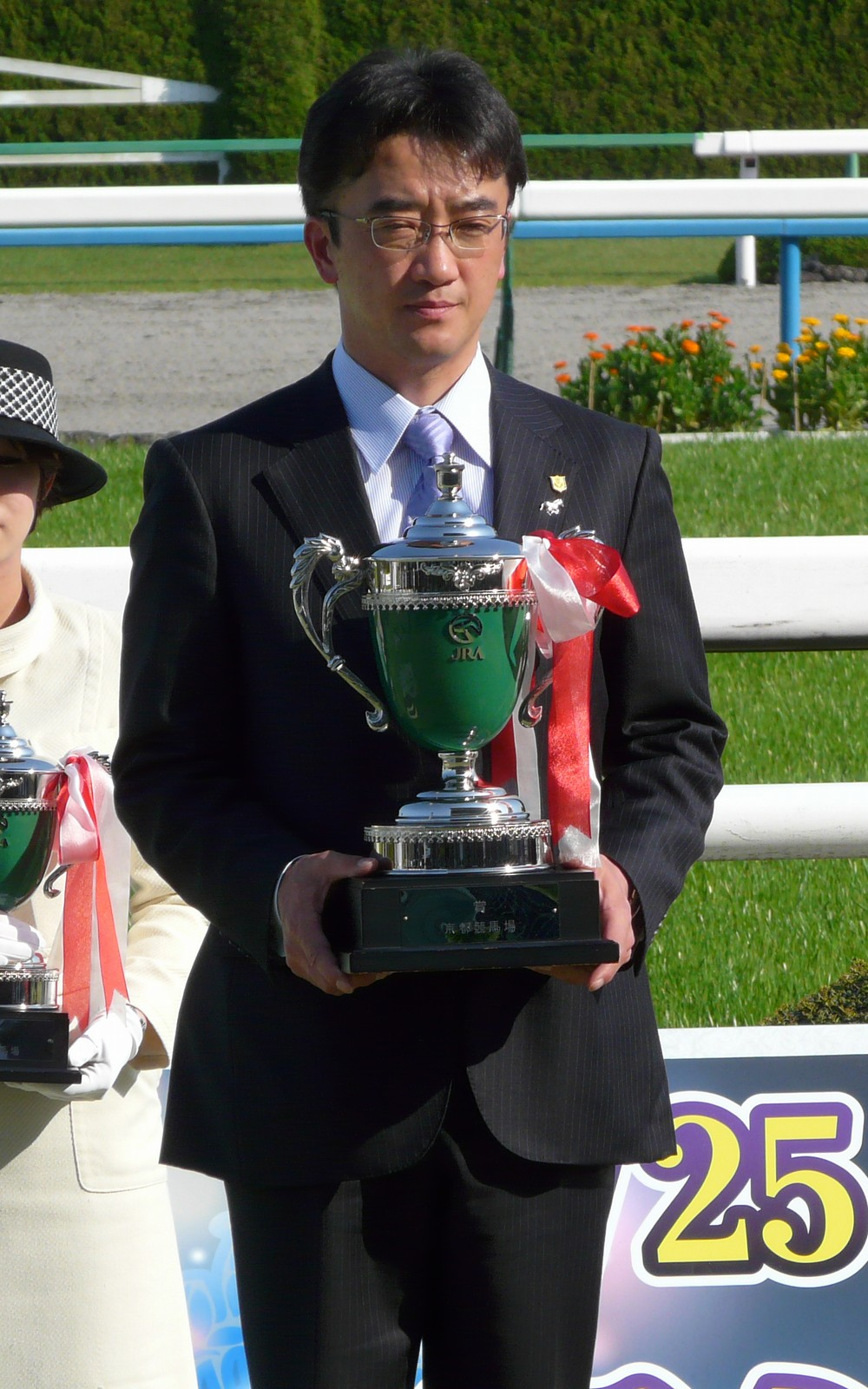
Suave Richard's trainer Yasushi Shono

Suave Richard made his three-year-old debut in the Tokinominoru Kinen (a trial race for the Satsuki Sho) over 1800 metres at Tokyo on 12 February and started the 2.1/1 second favourite. Ridden by Hirofumi Shii he settled behind the leaders before staying on in the straight, taking the lead in the last 200 metres and drawing away to win by two and a half lengths from Etre Digne. In the 77th running of the Satsuki Sho at Nakayama Racecourse on 26 April he started second choice in the betting but although he finished strongly he was never able to reach the leaders and came home sixth behind Al Ain. He was then moved up in distance for the Tokyo Yushun over 2400 metres at Tokyo on 26 May in which he again made good late progress but failed by three-quarters of a length to reel in the winner Rey de Oro.

After a break of over five months, Suave Richard returned in the Grade 2 Copa Republica Argentina over 2500 metres at Tokyo, a race in which he was matched against older horses for the first time and ridden by Mirco Demuro, who became his regular jockey. After racing in mid division, he moved up on the inside entering the straight, gained the advantage 300 metres out and quickly broke clear of the field to win by two and a half lengths from the five-year-old Sole Impact. On his final run of the season, the colt contested the Arima Kinen at Nakayama on 24 December and came home fourth of the sixteen runners behind Kitasan Black, Queens Ring and Cheval Grand.

In the 2017 World's Best Racehorse Rankings, Suave Richard was given a rating of 118, making him rated the 90th best horse in the world and the seventh-best horse in Japan.

=== 2018: four-year-old season ===
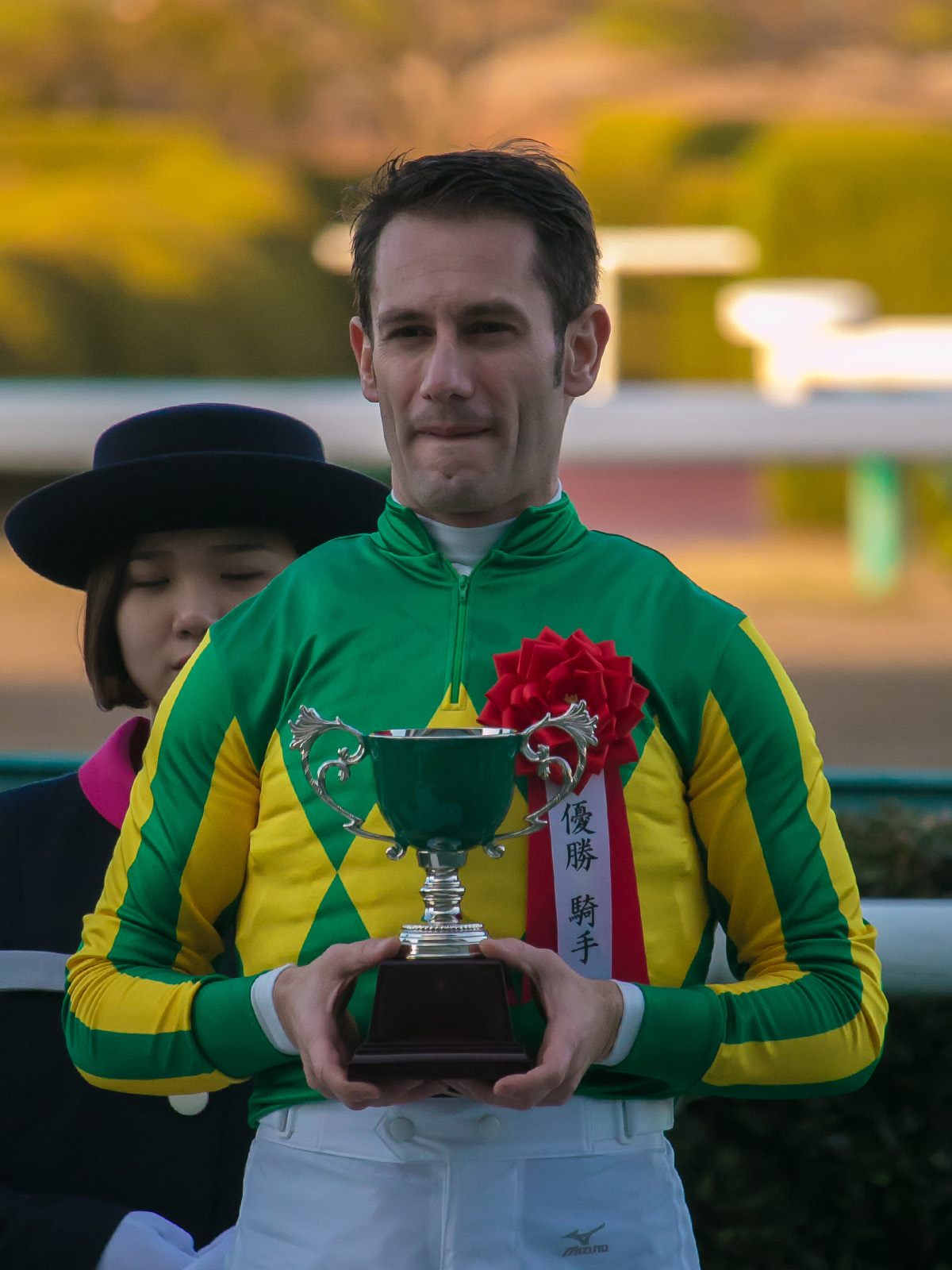
Mirco Demuro who rode Suave Richard in 2018

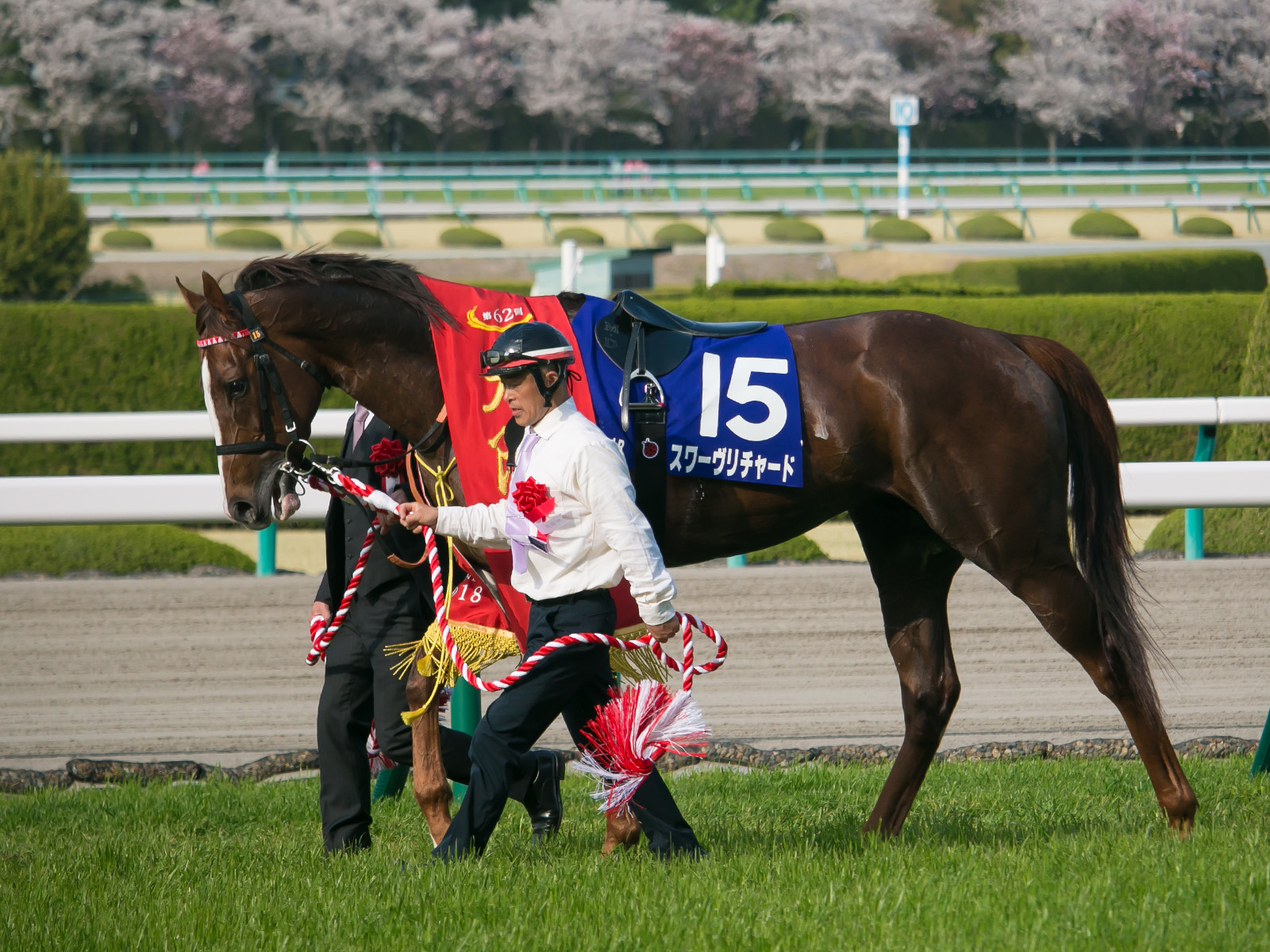
2018 Osaka Hai Awards Ceremony

On his first run as a four-year-old, Suave Richard started odds-on favourite for the Grade 2 Kinko Sho at Chukyo Racecourse over 2000 metres on 11 March. After tracking the front-running outsider Satono Noblesse for most of the way, he took the lead in the closing stages and won by half a length, with Satono Diamond a length away in third place. Three weeks later, the colt contested the Grade 1 Osaka Hai over the same distance at Hanshin and went off the 2.5/1 favourite in a sixteen-runner field which also included Al Ain, Satono Diamond, Cheval Grand, and the Mile Championship winner Persian Knight. Suave Richard raced towards the rear in the early stages before rushing up on the outside to dispute the lead in the straight. He gained a clear advantage early in the straight and "romped to a convincing victory", holding off the late charge of Persian Knight by three quarters of a length. Mirco Demuro commented "Since the pace was very slow, I decided to make an early bid. He responded so well, I had absolutely no doubts in him and he stretched beautifully". In June, the colt was dropped back in distance for the Yasuda Kinen over 1600 metres and started favourite, but after challenging for the lead in the straight he was outpaced in the final strides and came home third behind Mozu Ascot and Aerolithe, beaten a neck and three quarters of a length.

Returning from a lengthy summer break, Suave Richard was made favourite for the autumn edition of the Tenno Sho at Tokyo on 28 October, but after being badly hampered shortly after the start, he was never in serious contention and finished tenth behind Rey de Oro. The colt ended his season in the Japan Cup at Tokyo on 25 November in which he started the 5.5/1 second favourite and finished third behind Almond Eye and the front-running Kiseki.

In the 2018 World's Best Racehorse Rankings, Suave Richard's rating of 121 made him the thirty-first best racehorse in world.

=== 2019: five-year-old season ===
Suave Richard began his fourth campaign in the Nakayama Kinen over 1800 metres on 24 February when he stayed on well without being able to reach the leaders and came home fourth behind Win Bright, Lucky Lilac, and Stelvio. Rather than attempt a repeat victory in the Osaka Hai, the horse was sent to the United Arab Emirates to contest the Dubai Sheema Classic at Meydan Racecourse on 30 March. Ridden by João Moreira, he was restrained at the rear of the field before finishing strongly to take third place behind Old Persian and Cheval Grand. On his return to Japan, he went off the 7.8/1 sixth choice in the betting for the Takarazuka Kinen over 2200 metres on 23 June at Hanshin. The horse finished the race in third place behind Lys Gracieux and Kiseki after racing on the wide outside for most of the way before keeping on well in the straight.

On his return in autumn, Suave Richard was partnered by Norihiro Yokoyama when he made his second bid for the Tenno Sho. He raced in mid-division before making some progress in the straight but never looked likely to win and came home seventh behind Almond Eye, beaten five and a half lengths by the winner. On 24 November Suave Richard was one of fifteen horses to contest the 39th running of the Japan Cup and started the 4.1/1 third choice in the betting behind Rey de Oro and Wagnerian. The other contenders included Makahiki and Cheval Grand in a field which, for the first time, contained no overseas challengers. Ridden by Oisin Murphy he raced in mid-division he made a forward move on the inside entering the straight, gained the advantage 200 metres from the finish and held off the challenge of the three-year-old filly Curren Bouquetd'Or to win by three quarters of a length. Commenting on his decision to launch his final challenge along the inside rail Murphy said "I had the option of forcing Curren Bouquetd'or out. I could have done that. He's a big enough horse. But that would have taken too much energy, so I took the shortest way... I knew for the last 200 meters that Suave Richard would win" while Yasushi Shono said "both the horse and the jockey had a lot of courage".

Suave Richard ended his season on 22 December with a second attempt to win the Arima Kinen. He started at odds of 16.5/1 and was never in serious contention before finishing twelfth of the sixteen runners behind Lys Gracieux.

In January 2020, at the JRA Awards for 2019, Suave Richard finished third to Win Bright and Indy Champ in the poll to determine Best Older Male Horse. In the 2019 World's Best Racehorse Rankings Suave Richard was given a rating of 121, making him the 29th best racehorse in the world. Later that same month, it was announced by Shono that, in spite of the horse being selected for that year's Dubai Sheema Classic, the horse would be retired to stud due to his right hock becoming swollen not long after his last race.

== Racing form ==
Suave Richard won six races and finished in podium seven times in his 19 starts. This data is available based on JBIS, netkeiba and racingpost.

Date	Track	Race	Grade	Distance (Condition)	Entry	HN	Odds (Favored)	Finish	Time	Margins	Jockey	Winner (Runner-up)
2016 – two-year-old season
Sep 11	Hanshin	2yo Newcomer		2,000 m (Firm)	9	9	1.7 (1)	2nd	2:03.2	0.0	Hirofumi Shii	Meliora
Oct 2	Hanshin	2yo Maiden		2,000 m (Good)	10	7	1.1 (1)	1st	2:04.0	–0.2	Hirofumi Shii	(Piscadela)
Nov 19	Tokyo	Tokyo Sports Hai Nisai Stakes	3	1,800 m (Good)	10	9	8.1 (4)	2nd	1:48.3	0.0	Hirofumi Shii	Bless Journey
2017 – three-year-old season
Feb 12	Tokyo	Kyodo News Service Hai	3	1,800 m (Firm)	11	1	3.1 (2)	1st	1:47.5	–0.4	Hirofumi Shii	(Etre Digne)
Apr 16	Nakayama	Satsuki Sho	1	2,000 m (Firm)	18	2	7.0 (2)	6th	1:58.2	0.4	Hirofumi Shii	Al Ain
May 28	Tokyo	Tokyo Yushun	1	2,400 m (Firm)	18	4	5.9 (3)	2nd	2:27.0	0.1	Hirofumi Shii	Rey de Oro
Nov 5	Tokyo	Copa Republica Argentina	2	2,500 m (Firm)	16	4	2.0 (1)	1st	2:30.0	–0.4	Mirco Demuro	(Sole Impact)
Dec 24	Nakayama	Arima Kinen	1	2,500 m (Firm)	16	14	4.5 (2)	4th	2:33.8	0.2	Mirco Demuro	Kitasan Black
2018 – four-year-old season
Mar 11	Chukyo	Kinko Sho	2	2,000 m (Good)	9	9	1.6 (1)	1st	2:01.6	–0.1	Mirco Demuro	(Satono Noblesse)
Apr 1	Hanshin	Osaka Hai	1	2,000 m (Firm)	16	15	3.5 (1)	1st	1:58.2	–0.1	Mirco Demuro	(Persian Knight)
Jun 3	Tokyo	Yasuda Kinen	1	1,600 m (Firm)	16	1	2.8 (1)	3rd	1:31.4	0.1	Mirco Demuro	Mozu Ascot
Oct 28	Tokyo	Tenno Sho (Autumn)	1	2,000 m (Firm)	12	5	2.5 (1)	10th	1:58.3	1.5	Mirco Demuro	Rey de Oro
Nov 25	Tokyo	Japan Cup	1	2,400 m (Firm)	14	11	6.5 (2)	3rd	2:21.5	0.9	Mirco Demuro	Almond Eye
2019 – five-year-old season
Feb 24	Nakayama	Nakayama Kinen	2	1,800 m (Firm)	11	10	5.6 (4)	4th	1:45.7	0.2	Mirco Demuro	Win Bright
Mar 30	Meydan	Dubai Sheema Classic	1	2,410 m (Firm)	8	7	5.1 (3)	3rd	2:27.6	0.4	Joao Moreira	Old Persian
Jun 23	Hanshin	Takarazuka Kinen	1	2,200 m (Firm)	12	11	8.8 (6)	3rd	2:11.6	0.8	Mirco Demuro	Lys Gracieux
Oct 27	Tokyo	Tenno Sho (Autumn)	1	2,000 m (Firm)	16	4	19.1 (5)	7th	1:57.1	0.9	Norihiro Yokoyama	Almond Eye
Nov 24	Tokyo	Japan Cup	1	2,000 m (Soft)	15	5	5.1 (3)	1st	2:25.9	–0.1	Oisin Murphy	(Curren Bouquetd'or)
Dec 22	Nakayama	Arima Kinen	1	2,500 m (Firm)	16	2	17.5 (5)	12th	2:33.6	3.1	Oisin Murphy	Lys Gracieux

Legend:
Turf

== Stud record ==
Suave Richard started his stud duty at Shadai Stallion Station for a fee of 2,000,000 JPY. In his first year, he produced two graded race winners; Corazon Beat (2023 Keio Hai Nisai Stakes) and the grade 1 winner Regaleira (2023 Hopeful Stakes). With his first year success, his stud fee for 2024 was increased to 15,000,000 JPY. He has also topped the first season sire rankings by the end of 2023 with Regaleira being his top progeny.

=== Notable progeny ===
Below data is based on JBIS Stallion Reports.

c = colt, f = filly
bold = grade 1 stakes

**Foaled**	**Name**	**Sex**	**Major Wins**
2021	Corazon Beat	f	Keio Hai Nisai Stakes
2021	Regaleira	f	**Hopeful Stakes**, **Arima Kinen,** Sankei Sho All Comers, **Queen Elizabeth II Cup**
2021	Sweep Feet	f	Tulip Sho
2021	Admire Belle	f	Flora Stakes
2021	Urban Chic	c	St Lite Kinen, **Kikuka-shō**
2023	Green Energy	c	Keisei Hai
2023	Justin Chicago	c	St Lite Kinen

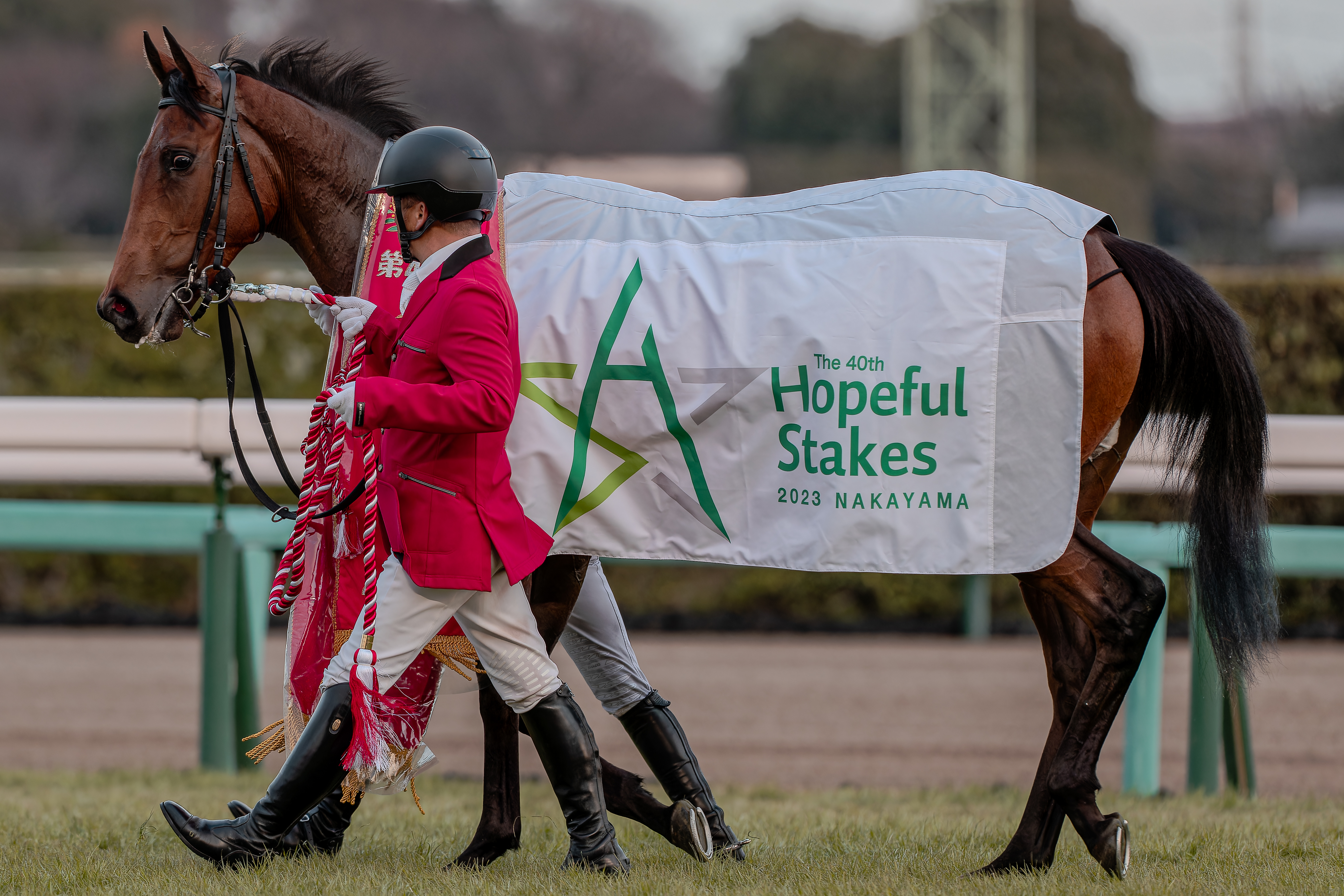
Regaleira

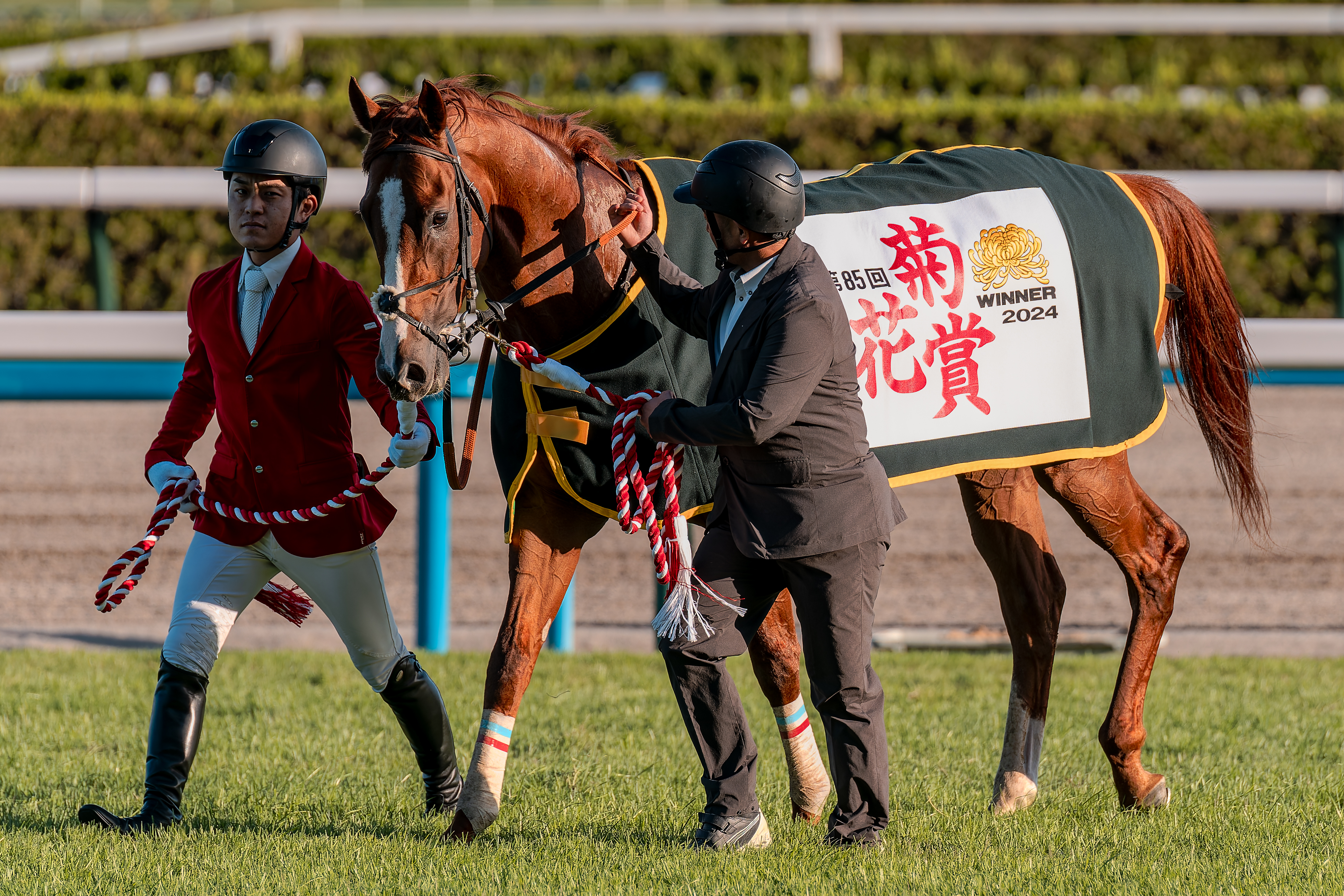
Urban Chic

== Pedigree ==
Pedigree of Suave Richard (JPN), chestnut stallion, 2014
Sire Heart's Cry (JPN) 2001	Sunday Silence (USA); 1986	Halo	Hail to Reason
Sire Heart's Cry (JPN) 2001	Sunday Silence (USA); 1986	Halo	Cosmah
Sire Heart's Cry (JPN) 2001	Sunday Silence (USA); 1986	Wishing Well	Understanding
Sire Heart's Cry (JPN) 2001	Sunday Silence (USA); 1986	Wishing Well	Mountain Flower
Sire Heart's Cry (JPN) 2001	Irish Dance (JPN); 1990	Tony Bin (IRE)	Kampala (GB)
Sire Heart's Cry (JPN) 2001	Irish Dance (JPN); 1990	Tony Bin (IRE)	Severn Bridge (GB)
Sire Heart's Cry (JPN) 2001	Irish Dance (JPN); 1990	Buper Dance (USA)	Lyphard
Sire Heart's Cry (JPN) 2001	Irish Dance (JPN); 1990	Buper Dance (USA)	My Bupers
Dam Pirramimma (USA) 2005	Unbridled's Song (USA); 1993	Unbridled	Fappiano
Dam Pirramimma (USA) 2005	Unbridled's Song (USA); 1993	Unbridled	Gana Facil
Dam Pirramimma (USA) 2005	Unbridled's Song (USA); 1993	Trolley Song	Caro (IRE)
Dam Pirramimma (USA) 2005	Unbridled's Song (USA); 1993	Trolley Song	Lucky Spell
Dam Pirramimma (USA) 2005	Career Collection (USA); 1995	General Meeting	Seattle Slew
Dam Pirramimma (USA) 2005	Career Collection (USA); 1995	General Meeting	Alydar's Promise
Dam Pirramimma (USA) 2005	Career Collection (USA); 1995	River of Stars	Riverman
Dam Pirramimma (USA) 2005	Career Collection (USA); 1995	River of Stars	Star Fortune (Family: 1-a)
