= Meiner Emperor =

Japanese Thoroughbred racehorse (foaled 2020)

Meiner Emperor; マイネルエンペラー
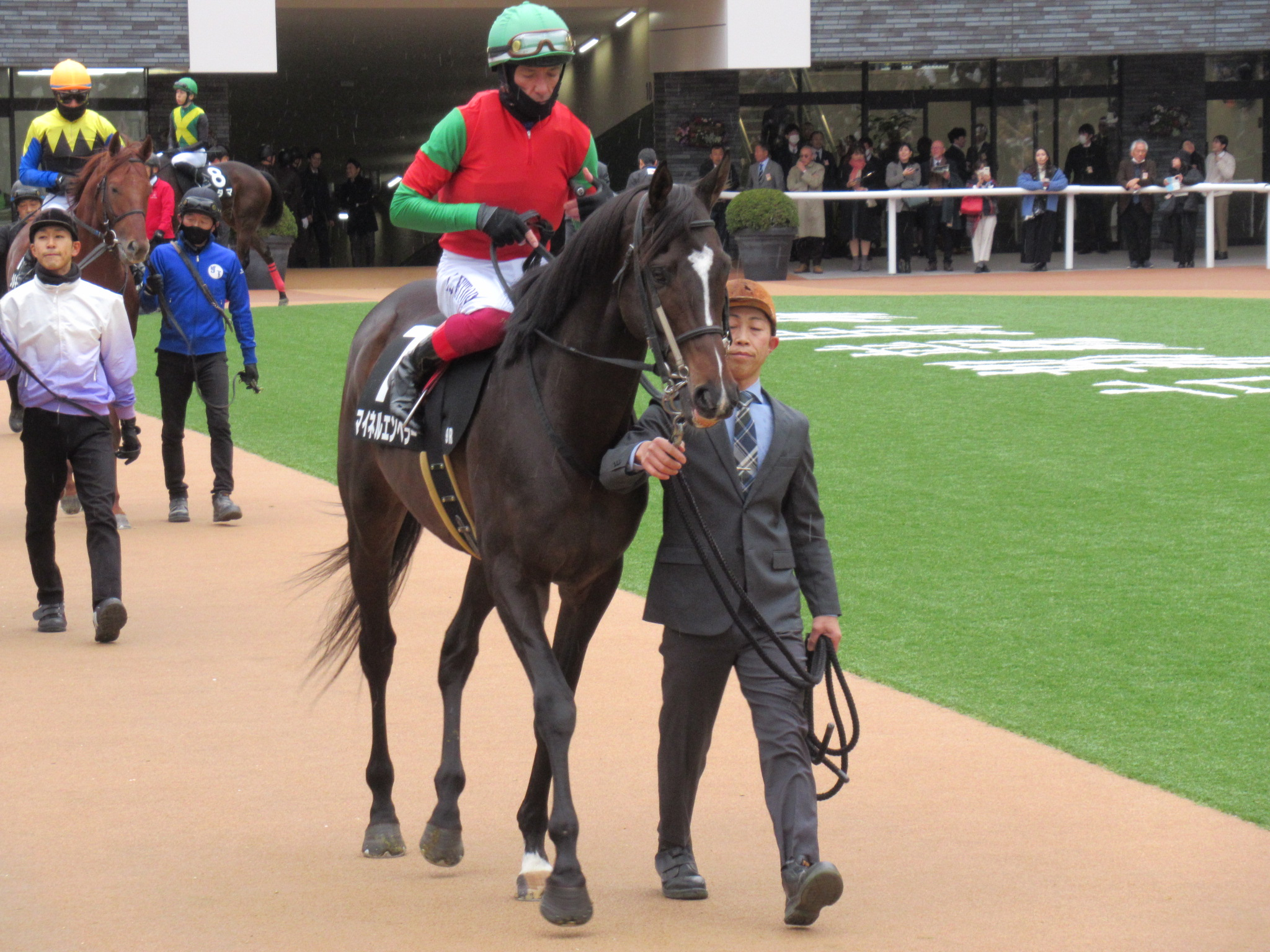
- Meiner Emperor in December 2024
- Breed: Thoroughbred
- Sire: Gold Ship
- Grandsire: Stay Gold
- Dam: Meiner Theresia
- Damsire: Roses in May
- Sex: Stallion
- Foaled: 13 March 2020
- Country: Japan
- Colour: Dark bay
- Breeder: Big Red Farm
- Owner: Thoroughbred Club Ruffian
- Racing colours
- Trainer: Hisashi Shimizu
- Jockey: Ryuji Wada; Yuji Tannai; Lanfranco Dettori
- Record: 27: 5-6-3
- Earnings: ¥245,242,000

Major wins
- Nikkei Shō (2025)

Meiner Emperor (Japanese: マイネルエンペラー, Hepburn: Mainā Enperā; foaled 13 March 2020) is a Japanese Thoroughbred racehorse. He has competed since 2022, recording five wins in twenty-five starts, including the Nikkei Shō (GII) in 2025. He is the half-brother of Meiner Fanrong, winner of the 2021 Niigata Kinen, and the full brother of Uberleben, winner of the 2021 Yūshun Himba.

== Background ==
Meiner Emperor is a dark bay horse bred in Niikappu, Hokkaido by Big Red Farm. He was sired by Gold Ship, a son of Stay Gold, and his dam was Meine Theresia, a daughter of the American-bred stallion Roses in May. Meine Theresia also foaled Uberleben (also by Gold Ship), who won the 2021 Yūshun Himba (Japanese Oaks), and Meiner Fanrong (by Stay Gold), who won the 2021 Niigata Kinen. His racing name combines the "Meiner" prefix used by owner Thoroughbred Club Ruffian with "Emperor." He was sent into training with Hisashi Shimizu at the JRA's Ritto Training Center.

== Racing career ==
=== 2022: two-year-old season ===
Meiner Emperor debuted on October 29, 2022, in a maiden race on the turf at Hanshin Racecourse, winning by 0.3 seconds. He finished fourth in the Erica Sho (Allowance) at Hanshin in December.

=== 2023: three-year-old season ===
Meiner Emperor finished second in a 1-win-class race at Chukyo Racecourse in January. He finished fifth in the Wakaba Stakes (Listed) at Hanshin in March and seventh in the Aoba Shō (GII) at Tokyo Racecourse in April, failing to qualify for the Classics.

Returning in the autumn, he won a 1-win-class race at Kyoto Racecourse on November 26 and the Owari Tokubetsu (Allowance) at Chukyo on December 17.

=== 2024: four-year-old season ===
Meiner Emperor ran in eight races in the 3-win class without a victory through November. On December 8, he won the Orion Stakes (3-win class) at Kyoto, ridden by Lanfranco Dettori, and was promoted to the open class.

=== 2025: five-year-old season ===
Meiner Emperor finished third in the Nikkei Shinshun Hai (GII) at Chukyo on January 19. On March 29, he contested the Nikkei Shō (GII) at Nakayama Racecourse. Ridden by Yuji Tannai, he took the lead past the third corner and won by a neck over Chuck Nate, recording his first graded stakes victory. He subsequently finished fifth in the Tennō Shō (Spring, GI) at Kyoto in May and ninth in the Arima Kinen (GI) at Nakayama in December.

=== 2026: six-year-old season ===
Meiner Emperor finished eleventh in the American Jockey Club Cup (GII) at Nakayama in January, fifth in the Hanshin Daishōten (GII) at Hanshin in March, and tenth in the Takarazuka Kinen (GI) at Hanshin in June. He returned back to racetrack at the Kyoto Daishoten in October with new jockey, Seinosuke Yoshimura. On a rainy and more softer racetrack, Meiner Emperor performed well and finished in second place three quarters of a length behind the winner, Ecoro Dinos. One month later, he raced in the Copa Republica Argentina. Trainer Shimizu said he was in better condition than his previous start leading up to the race day. On the day, he maintained his form at the back of the pack and made a bid for the win in the homestretch, as he crossed the line in fourth. Yoshimura spoke after the race, "He ran calmly on the backstretch, and I thought his position was good. I started to push early, and although he's not bad at uphill, he stretched out well after reaching the top, and it was flat. The way the race went wasn't bad, but the result is the only disappointing thing."

== Statistics ==
The following table details all 27 starts of Meiner Emperor's racing career based on official netkeiba and JBIS records. Record current as of 8 November 2026.

Date	Distance (Condition)	Race	Class	Course	Odds (Favourite)	Field	Finish	Time	Jockey	Winning (Losing) Margin	Winner (2nd Place)	Ref
2022 – two-year-old season
Oct 29	Turf 2000 m (Firm)	2-Y-O Newcomer	Maiden	Hanshin	4.7 (2nd)	11	1st	2:01.9	Ryuji Wada	–0.3	(Penetrate Go)	
Dec 10	Turf 2000 m (Firm)	Erica Sho	Allowance	Hanshin	6.4 (4th)	13	4th	2:01.1	Fuma Izumiya	0.4	Remuage	
2023 – three-year-old season
Jan 14	Turf 2200 m (Soft)	3-Y-O 1-Win Class	Allowance	Chukyo	5.1 (4th)	6	2nd	2:17.0	Ryuji Wada	0.3	Shonan Bashit	
Mar 18	Turf 2000 m (Good)	Wakaba Stakes	Listed	Hanshin	8.4 (3rd)	9	5th	2:03.0	Ryuji Wada	0.3	Shonan Bashit	
Apr 29	Turf 2400 m (Firm)	Aoba Shō	GII	Tokyo	66.9 (10th)	15	7th	2:25.0	Ryuji Wada	1.1	Skilfing	
Oct 14	Turf 2400 m (Firm)	3-Y-O 1-Win Class	Allowance	Kyoto	3.2 (2nd)	10	2nd	2:25.2	Mirai Iwata	0.4	Keiai Sandera	
Nov 4	Turf 2200 m (Firm)	3-Y-O 1-Win Class	Allowance	Kyoto	4.0 (2nd)	11	4th	2:12.5	Hayato Yoshida	0.4	June Aoniyoshi	
Nov 26	Turf 2000 m (Firm)	3-Y-O 1-Win Class	Allowance	Kyoto	2.9 (1st)	14	1st	2:00.9	Takeshi Yokoyama	-0.1	(Britannia)	
Dec 17	Turf 2200 m (Firm)	Owari Tokubetsu	Allowance	Chukyo	3.7 (3rd)	9	1st	2:15.1	Masami Matsuoka	0.0	(Meisho Gekirin)	
2024 – four-year-old season
Jan 8	Turf 2000 m (Firm)	Kotobuki Stakes	3-Win Class	Kyoto	9.0 (5th)	12	8th	2:01.1	Kohei Matsuyama	0.8	David Barows	
Jan 28	Turf 2200 m (Firm)	Yasaka Stakes	3-Win Class	Kyoto	18.2 (8th)	12	4th	2:13.1	Ryusei Sakai	0.4	Sasutsurugi	
Jul 7	Turf 1800 m (Good)	Goryokaku Stakes	3-Win Class	Hakodate	7.8 (3rd)	14	2nd	1:49.7	Takeshi Yokoyama	0.3	Kiminonawa Maria	
Jul 27	Turf 2000 m (Firm)	STV Sho	3-Win Class	Sapporo	4.6 (2nd)	14	6th	2:01.1	Takeshi Yokoyama	0.5	Verehrung	
Aug 24	Turf 2000 m (Firm)	WASJ Round 2	3-Win Class	Sapporo	4.9 (2nd)	14	7th	2:00.7	Yutaka Take	0.6	Schwarz Kugel	
Sep 28	Turf 2000 m (Firm)	Takayama Stakes	3-Win Class	Chukyo	7.7 (4th)	13	3rd	2:00.1	Andrasch Starke	0.2	Makoto Velikij	
Oct 20	Turf 2000 m (Firm)	Kaiji Stakes	3-Win Class	Tokyo	15.4 (5th)	8	2nd	2:00.8	Masami Matsuoka	0.3	Tosen Ryo	
Nov 17	Turf 2400 m (Firm)	Hiei Stakes	3-Win Class	Kyoto	22.5 (7th)	17	2nd	2:24.6	Akihide Tsumura	0.1	Veloce Era	
Dec 8	Turf 2200 m (Firm)	Orion Stakes	3-Win Class	Kyoto	4.0 (2nd)	12	1st	2:13.8	Lanfranco Dettori	0.0	(Shake Your Heart)	
2025 – five-year-old season
Jan 19	Turf 2200 m (Firm)	Nikkei Shinshun Hai	GII	Chukyo	15.0 (7th)	16	3rd	2:10.4	Hideaki Miyuki	0.6	Lord Del Rey	
Mar 29	Turf 2500 m (Firm)	Nikkei Shō	GII	Nakayama	7.4 (2nd)	15	1st	2:36.1	Yuji Tannai	0.0	(Chuck Nate)	
May 4	Turf 3200 m (Firm)	Tennō Shō (Spring)	GI	Kyoto	19.7 (8th)	15	5th	3:15.0	Yuji Tannai	1.0	Redentor	
Dec 28	Turf 2500 m (Firm)	Arima Kinen	GI	Nakayama	111.5 (11th)	16	9th	2:32.3	Yuji Tannai	0.8	Museum Mile	
2026 – six-year-old season
Jan 25	Turf 2200 m (Firm)	American Jockey Club Cup	GII	Nakayama	9.1 (5th)	16	11th	2:12.1	Keita Tosaki	1.3	Shohei	
Mar 22	Turf 3000 m (Firm)	Hanshin Daishōten	GII	Hanshin	7.2 (4th)	10	5th	3:03.0	Yuji Tannai	1.0	Admire Terra	
Jun 14	Turf 2200 m (Good)	Takarazuka Kinen	GI	Hanshin	121.0 (13th)	18	10th	2:13.8	Yuga Kawada	1.7	Meisho Tabaru	
Oct 4	Turf 2400 m (Good)	Kyoto Daishoten	GII	Kyoto	21.8 (8th)	18	2nd	2:24.1	Seinosuke Yoshimura	0.1	Ecoro Dinos	
Nov 8	Turf 2500 m (Firm)	Copa Republica Argentina	GII	Tokyo	18.2 (8th)	18	4th	2:31.0	Seinosuke Yoshimura	0.1	Family Time	

== Pedigree ==
Pedigree of Meiner Emperor (JPN)
Sire Gold Ship (JPN) 2009	Stay Gold (JPN); 1994	Sunday Silence	Halo
Sire Gold Ship (JPN) 2009	Stay Gold (JPN); 1994	Sunday Silence	Wishing Well
Sire Gold Ship (JPN) 2009	Stay Gold (JPN); 1994	Golden Sash	Dictus
Sire Gold Ship (JPN) 2009	Stay Gold (JPN); 1994	Golden Sash	Dyna Sash
Sire Gold Ship (JPN) 2009	Point Flag (JPN); 1998	Mejiro McQueen	Mejiro Titan
Sire Gold Ship (JPN) 2009	Point Flag (JPN); 1998	Mejiro McQueen	Mejiro Aurora
Sire Gold Ship (JPN) 2009	Point Flag (JPN); 1998	Pastoralism	Pluralism
Sire Gold Ship (JPN) 2009	Point Flag (JPN); 1998	Pastoralism	Tokuno Eighty
Dam Meiner Theresia (JPN) 2007	Roses in May (USA); 2000	Devil His Due	Devil's Bag
Dam Meiner Theresia (JPN) 2007	Roses in May (USA); 2000	Devil His Due	Plenty O'Toole
Dam Meiner Theresia (JPN) 2007	Roses in May (USA); 2000	Tell a Secret	Speak John
Dam Meiner Theresia (JPN) 2007	Roses in May (USA); 2000	Tell a Secret	Secret Retreat
Dam Meiner Theresia (JPN) 2007	Meiner Nouvelle (JPN); 2000	Brian's Time	Roberto
Dam Meiner Theresia (JPN) 2007	Meiner Nouvelle (JPN); 2000	Brian's Time	Kelley's Day
Dam Meiner Theresia (JPN) 2007	Meiner Nouvelle (JPN); 2000	Meiner Pretender	Zabeel
Dam Meiner Theresia (JPN) 2007	Meiner Nouvelle (JPN); 2000	Meiner Pretender	Giladah

- Meiner Emperor is inbred 4 × 5 to Halo and 5 × 5 to Hail to Reason.
- His half-brother Meiner Fanrong (by Stay Gold) won the 2021 Niigata Kinen (GIII).
- His full sister Uberleben (by Gold Ship) won the 2021 Yūshun Himba (GI).
- His dam Meiner Nouvelle won the 2003 Flower Cup (GIII).

== See also ==
- Thoroughbred racing in Japan
- Nikkei Shō
