= Uberleben =

Japanese-bred Thoroughbred racehorse

Uberleben ユーバーレーベン
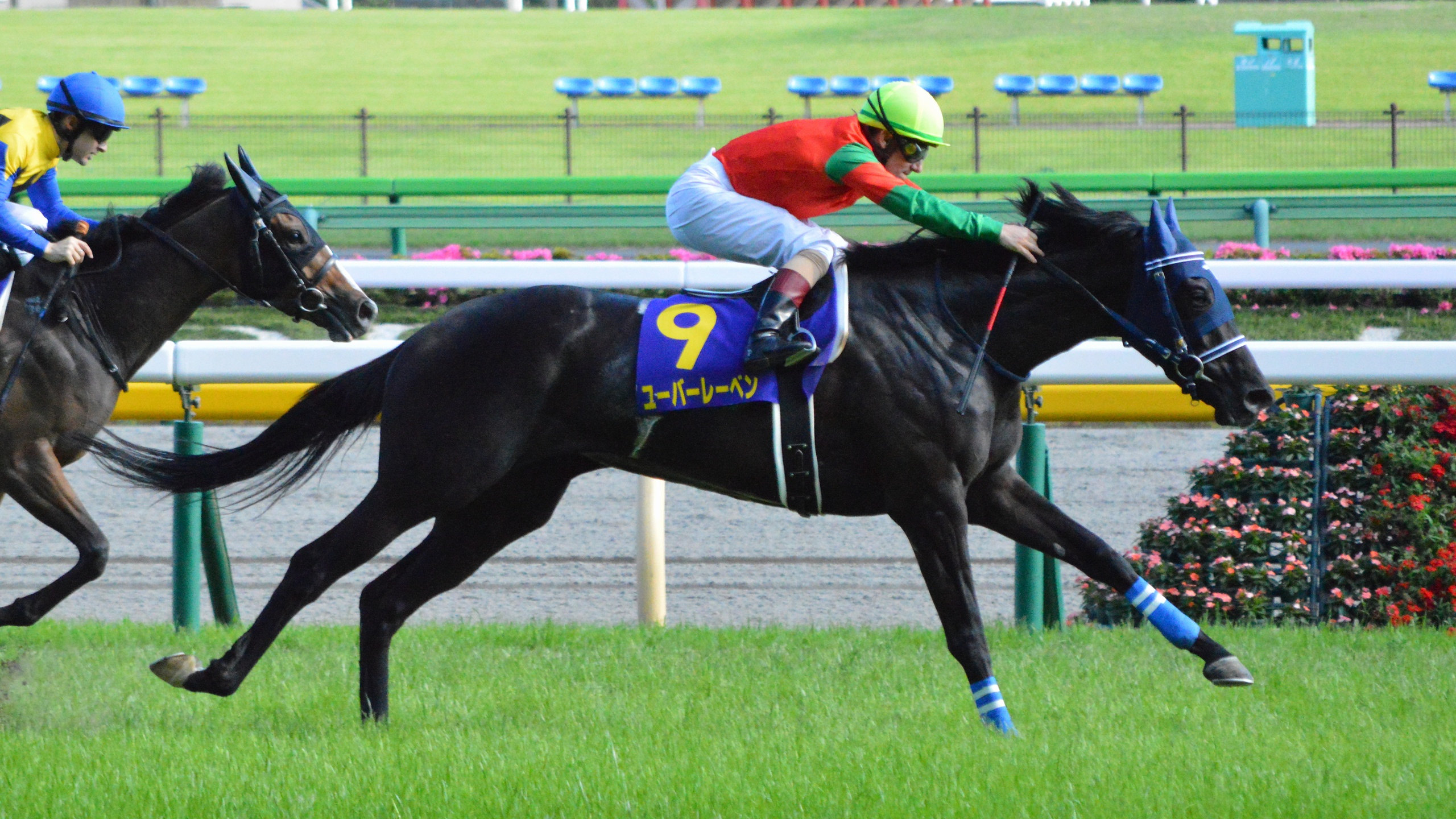
- Uberleben at the 2021 Yushun Himba
- Sire: Gold Ship
- Grandsire: Stay Gold
- Dam: Meine Theresia
- Damsire: Roses In May
- Sex: Mare
- Foaled: 27 January 2018 (age 8)
- Country: Japan
- Colour: Brown
- Breeder: Big Red Farm
- Owner: K.Thoroughbred Club Ruffian
- Racing colours
- Trainer: Takahisa Tezuka
- Jockey: Mirco Demuro
- Record: 15: 2-1-4
- Earnings: ¥202,555,000 $180,000

Major wins
- Japanese Classic Tiara Race wins: Yushun Himba (2021)
- Last updated on 2026-7-18

Uberleben (Japanese: ユーバーレーベン, Hepburn: Yūbārēben; foaled 27 January 2018) is a Japanese Thoroughbred racehorse. She showed promise as a juvenile in 2020 when she won on her racecourse debut and went on to finish second in the Sapporo Nisai Stakes and third in the Hanshin Juvenile Fillies. In the following year she ran third in both the Flower Cup and the Flora Stakes before taking the Yushun Himba.

== Background ==
Uberleben is a brown mare bred in Japan by Big Red Farm. She entered the ownership of K.Thoroughbred Club Ruffian and was sent into training with Takahisa Tezuka. She usually races in a hood.

She was from the second crop of foals sired by Gold Ship, an outstanding Japanese racehorse whose wins included the Satsuki Sho, Kikuka Sho, Tenno Sho, Arima Kinen and Takarazuka Kinen. Uberleben's dam Meine Theresia showed modest racing ability, winning one minor contest from three starts as a two-year-old in 2009. She was a daughter of the Flower Cup winner Meine Nouvelle and a female-line descendant of the British broodmare Inquisitive Rose, the grand-dam of Drum Taps.

== Racing career ==
=== 2020: two-year-old season ===
Uberleben began her racing career in a contest for previously unraced juveniles over 1800 metres on soft ground at Tokyo Racecourse on 14 June when she was ridden by Keita Tosaki. Starting the 9.2/1 fourth choice in the betting she came from fourth place on the final turn to win by a nose from the colt Guadeloupe. The filly was again partnered by Tosaki when she was moved up in class for the Grade 3 Sapporo Nisai Stakes over the same distance Sapporo Racecourse on 5 September and went off at odds of 9.6/1 in a fourteen-runner field. After being restrained in the early stages she stayed on well in the straight to take second place, beaten a neck by the white filly Sodashi. She was ridden by Daichi Shibata in the Grade 3 Artemis Stakes at Tokyo on 31 October when she came home ninth behind Sodashi after racing at the rear of the fourteen-runner field for most of the way. For her final run of the year Uberleben was stepped up Grade 1 level for the Hanshin Juvenile Fillies over 1600 metres Hanshin Racecourse on 13 December and started a 30/1 outsider. She raced towards the rear of the field as usual before producing a strong late run on the outside and finishing third, beaten a nose and a neck by Sodashi and Satono Reinas.

In the official Japanese rankings, Uberleben was rated the third best two-year-old filly of 2020, two pound behind Sodashi and one pound behind Satono Reinas.

=== 2021: three-year-old season ===
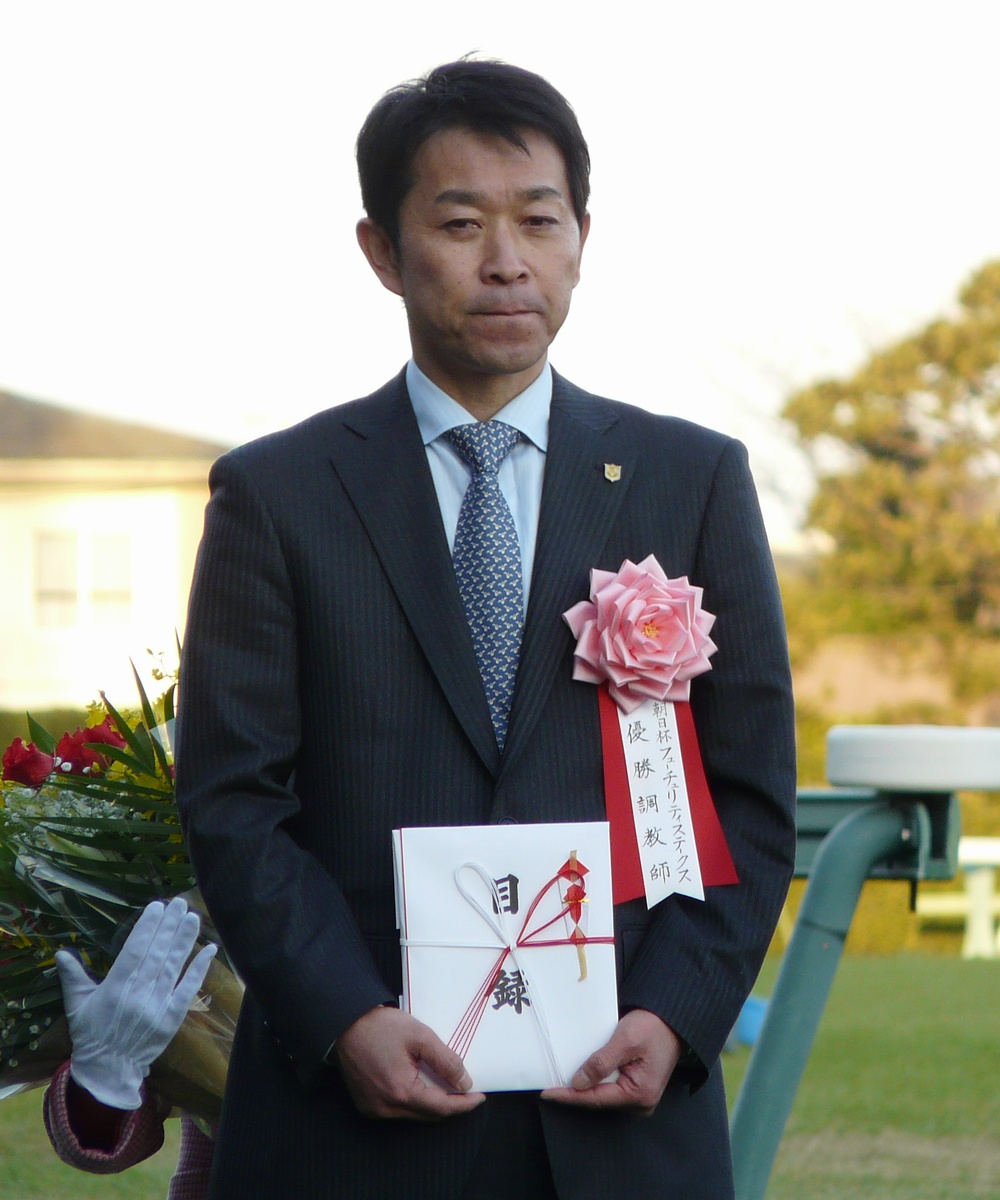
Uberleben's trainer Takahisa Tezuka

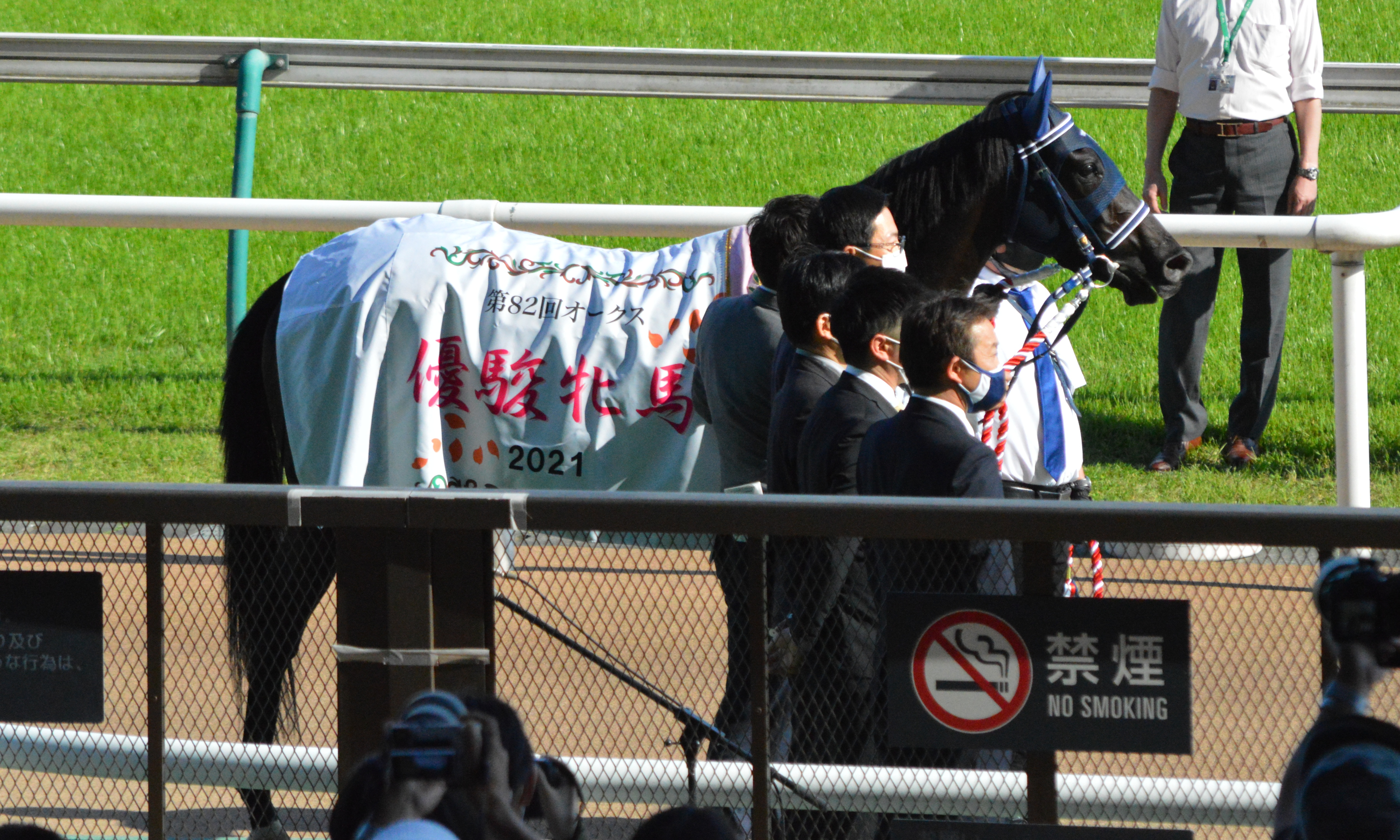
Uberleben at the Yushun Himba victory ceremony

On her three-year-old debut 20 March at Nakayama Racecourse Uberleben was ridden by Yuji Tannai when she started favourite for the Grade 3 Flower Cup. She produced her customary late run from the rear of the field but was unable to catch the leaders and came home third behind Ho O Ixelles and Enthusiasm, beaten one and a quarter lengths by the winner. Takahisa Tezuka later explained that the filly had been suffering from colic early in the year and was unsuited by the tight turns of the Nakayama track. The filly was partnered by Demuro when she was stepped up in class and distance for the Flora Stakes (a trial race for the Yushun Himba) over 2000 metres at Tokyo on 25 April. Starting the 2.5/1 second favourite she settled in mid-division before staying on strongly to take third place behind Cool Cat and Slyly.

In the 82nd running of the Yushun Himba over 2400 metres at Tokyo on 23 May Uberleben was ridden by Demuro and went off the 7.9/1 third choice in the betting behind Sodashi and Akaitorino Musume (winner of the Queen Cup) in an eighteen-runner field which also included Fine Rouge (Fairy Stakes), Cool Cat, Enthusiasm and Slyly. She settled in mid-division on the outside as Cool Cat set the pace and turned into the straight in eighth place before making rapid progress down the centre of track. She gained the advantage approaching the last 200 metres and kept on well to win by a length and a nose from Akaitorino Musume and the 214/1 outsider Hagino Pilina. Demuro commented "She responded well when the pace accelerated from the third corner and showed her tenacity in steadily advancing in the straight. She was strong pulling away and holding off the others. The added distance wasn’t a problem for her at all."

After the Yushun Himba, Uberleben ran the Shuka Sho with Mirco Demuro as her jockey but came in at 13th place. Uberleben also then ran the Japan Cup but came in 6th place behind Contrail and Shahryar. Following the Japan Cup, it was announced that Uberleben's next race would be the Kyoto Kinen the following year.

=== 2022: four-year-old season ===
Uberleben started the 2022 season by running the Kyoto Kinen, as announced previously, and came in 5th place despite being a 3.1/1 favorite. Uberleben then went on to compete in the 2022 Dubai Sheema Classic, of which she also came in 5th place behind Shahryar. Uberleben would have little success for the rest of the year, with her finishing the Autumn Tenno Sho at 8th place being the highest for the remaining half of 2022.

=== 2023: five-year-old season ===
Uberleben only ran one race in 2023, which was the American Jockey Club Cup where she finished 3rd. Following this, she was being prepared to enter the Kinko Sho where it was discovered that she had developed a bowed tendon, which led to her owner to announce her retirement on March 2.

== Racing form ==
Uberleben won two races out of 15 starts. This data is available on JBIS, netkeiba and Emirates Racing Authority (ERA).

Date	Track	Race	Grade	Distance (Condition)	Entry	HN	Odds (Favored)	Finish	Time	Margins	Jockey	Winner (Runner-up)
2020 – two-year-old season
Jun 14	Tokyo	2yo Newcomer		1,800 m (Heavy)	12	1	10.2 (4)	1st	1:52.6	0.0	Keita Tosaki	(Guadeloupe)
Sep 5	Sapporo	Sapporo Nisai Stakes	3	1,800 m (Firm)	14	8	10.6 (5)	2nd	1:48.2	0.0	Keita Tosaki	Sodashi
Oct 31	Tokyo	Artemis Stakes	3	1,600 m (Firm)	16	5	11.1 (4)	9th	1:35.7	0.8	Daichi Shibata	Sodashi
Dec 13	Hanshin	Hanshin Juvenile Fillies	1	1,600 m (Firm)	18	11	30.0 (6)	3rd	1:33.2	0.1	Mirco Demuro	Sodashi
2021 – three-year-old season
Mar 20	Nakayama	Flower Cup	3	1,800 m (Firm)	16	13	3.6 (1)	3rd	1:49.4	0.2	Yuji Tannai	Ho O Ixelles
Apr 25	Tokyo	Flora Stakes	2	2,000 m (Firm)	17	3	3.5 (2)	3rd	1:59.6	0.2	Mirco Demuro	Cool Cat
May 23	Tokyo	Yushun Himba	1	2,400 m (Firm)	18	9	8.9 (3)	1st	2:24.5	–0.1	Mirco Demuro	(Akaitorino Musume)
Oct 17	Hanshin	Shuka Sho	1	2,000 m (Firm)	16	11	10.6 (5)	13th	2:02.7	1.5	Mirco Demuro	Akaitorino Musume
Nov 28	Tokyo	Japan Cup	1	2,400 m (Firm)	18	14	25.5 (5)	6th	2:25.5	0.8	Mirco Demuro	Contrail
2022 – four-year-old season
Feb 13	Hanshin	Kyoto Kinen	2	2,200 m (Good)	13	6	3.1 (1)	5th	2:12.3	0.4	Mirco Demuro	African Gold
Mar 26	Meydan	Dubai Sheema Classic	1	2,410 m (Firm)	15	15	16.9 (7)	5th	2:27.1	0.2	Damian Lane	Shahryar
Aug 21	Sapporo	Sapporo Kinen	2	2,000 m (Firm)	16	14	18.7 (6)	11th	2:02.6	1.4	Mirco Demuro	Jack d'Or
Oct 30	Tokyo	Tenno Sho (Autumn)	1	2,000 m (Firm)	15	14	43.8 (10)	8th	1:58.3	0.8	Mirco Demuro	Equinox
Nov 27	Tokyo	Japan Cup	1	2,400 m (Firm)	18	17	35.5 (10)	10th	2:24.7	1.0	Mirco Demuro	Vela Azul
2023 – five-year-old season
Jan 22	Nakayama	American Jockey Club Cup	2	2,200 m (Firm)	14	6	8.0 (3)	3rd	2:13.7	0.2	Mirco Demuro	North Bridge

Legend:
Turf

== Breeding career ==
Following her retirement, she assumed broodmare duty at the Big Red Farm.

In 2025, she foaled her first crop, which is a colt by Equinox.

== Pedigree ==
Pedigree of Uberleben (JPN), brown mare 2018
Sire Gold Ship (JPN) 2009	Stay Gold (JPN); 1994	Sunday Silence (USA)	Halo
Sire Gold Ship (JPN) 2009	Stay Gold (JPN); 1994	Sunday Silence (USA)	Wishing Well
Sire Gold Ship (JPN) 2009	Stay Gold (JPN); 1994	Golden Sash	Dictus (FR)
Sire Gold Ship (JPN) 2009	Stay Gold (JPN); 1994	Golden Sash	Dyna Sash
Sire Gold Ship (JPN) 2009	Point Flag (JPN); 1998	Mejiro McQueen	Mejiro Titan
Sire Gold Ship (JPN) 2009	Point Flag (JPN); 1998	Mejiro McQueen	Mejiro Aurora
Sire Gold Ship (JPN) 2009	Point Flag (JPN); 1998	Pastoralism	Pluralisme (USA)
Sire Gold Ship (JPN) 2009	Point Flag (JPN); 1998	Pastoralism	Tokuno Eighty
Dam Meine Theresia (JPN) 2007	Roses In May (USA); 2000	Devil His Due	Devil's Bag
Dam Meine Theresia (JPN) 2007	Roses In May (USA); 2000	Devil His Due	Plenty O'Toole
Dam Meine Theresia (JPN) 2007	Roses In May (USA); 2000	Tell A Secret	Speak John
Dam Meine Theresia (JPN) 2007	Roses In May (USA); 2000	Tell A Secret	Secret Retreat
Dam Meine Theresia (JPN) 2007	Meine Nouvelle (JPN); 2000	Brian's Time (USA)	Roberto
Dam Meine Theresia (JPN) 2007	Meine Nouvelle (JPN); 2000	Brian's Time (USA)	Kelley's Day
Dam Meine Theresia (JPN) 2007	Meine Nouvelle (JPN); 2000	Meine Pretender (NZ)	Zabeel
Dam Meine Theresia (JPN) 2007	Meine Nouvelle (JPN); 2000	Meine Pretender (NZ)	Giladah (IRE) (Family: 6-b)

- Uberleben has a half brother named Meiner Fanrong (by Stay Gold), who won the Niigata Kinen in 2021, as well as a full brother named Meiner Emperor who won the Nikkei Sho in 2025.
