= Meiner Fanrong =

Japanese Thoroughbred racehorse (foaled 2015)

Meiner Fanrong マイネルファンロン
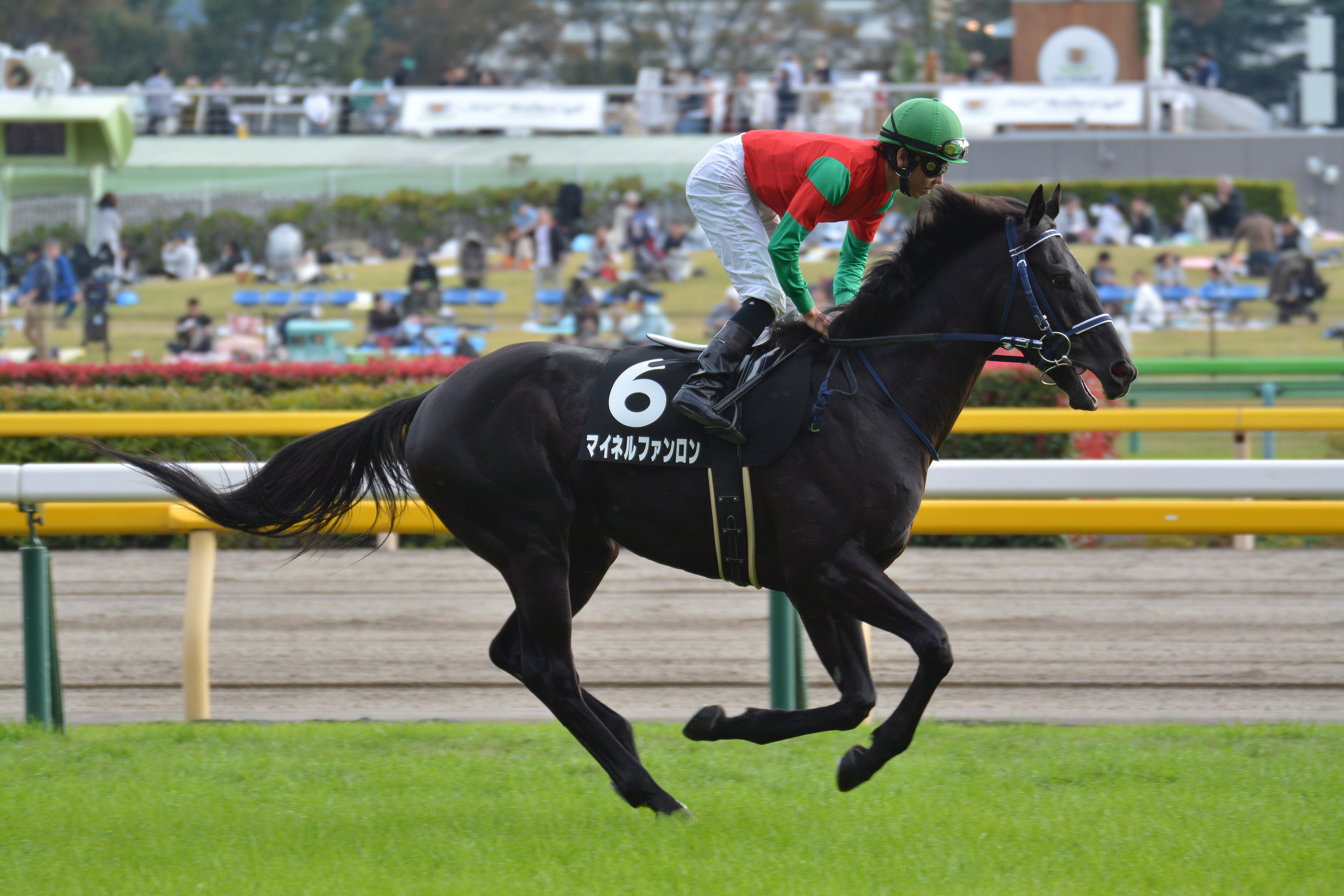
- Meiner Fanrong in November 2018
- Breed: Thoroughbred
- Sire: Stay Gold
- Grandsire: Sunday Silence
- Dam: Meiner Theresia
- Damsire: Roses in May
- Sex: Gelding
- Foaled: 19 February 2015
- Country: Japan
- Colour: Dark bay
- Breeder: Big Red Farm
- Owner: Thoroughbred Club Ruffian
- Racing colours
- Trainer: Takahisa Tezuka
- Jockey: Daichi Shibata; João Moreira; Mirco Demuro
- Record: 48: 5-5-5 (46 flat: 5-5-5; 2 steeplechase: 0-0-0)
- Earnings: ¥201,775,000

Major wins
- Niigata Kinen (2021)

Meiner Fanrong (Japanese: マイネルファンロン, Hepburn: Mainā Fanron; foaled 19 February 2015) is a retired Japanese Thoroughbred racehorse. He competed from 2017 to 2024, recording five wins in forty-eight starts, including the Niigata Kinen (GIII) in 2021. He is the half-brother of Uberleben, winner of the 2021 Yūshun Himba, and Meiner Emperor, winner of the 2025 Nikkei Shō.

== Background ==
Meiner Fanrong is a dark bay horse bred in Niikappu, Hokkaido, by Big Red Farm. He was sired by Stay Gold, a son of Sunday Silence, and his dam was Meiner Theresia, a daughter of the American-bred stallion Roses in May. His dam Meiner Theresia is also the dam of Uberleben (by Gold Ship), who won the 2021 Yūshun Himba (Japanese Oaks). His racing name combines the "Meiner" prefix used by owner Thoroughbred Club Ruffian with "Fanrong," the Chinese word for "prosperity" (繁榮). He was sent into training with Takahisa Tezuka at the JRA's Miho Training Center.

== Racing career ==
=== 2017: Two-year-old season ===
Meiner Fanrong debuted on September 16, 2017, in a maiden race on the turf at Nakayama Racecourse, finishing second. He won a maiden race at Tokyo Racecourse on October 7. He finished third in the Habotan Sho (Allowance) at Nakayama in December.

=== 2018: Three-year-old season ===
Meiner Fanrong finished second in the Freesia Sho (Allowance) at Tokyo in February. He finished third in the Spring Stakes (GII) at Nakayama in March, earning priority entry to the Satsuki Shō. He finished thirteenth in the Satsuki Shō (GI) in April.

Ridden by João Moreira, he won a 5-million-yen allowance race at Sapporo Racecourse in August and the Narashino Tokubetsu (Allowance) at Nakayama in September. He finished third in the November Stakes (Allowance) at Tokyo in November.

=== 2019: Four-year-old season ===
Meiner Fanrong won the Wangan Stakes (Allowance) over 2200 meters at Nakayama in April. He finished second in the Hakodate Kinen (GIII) at Hakodate Racecourse in July, losing by a neck to My Style. He finished unplaced in his remaining four starts that year.

=== 2020: Five-year-old season ===
Meiner Fanrong ran in seven races in 2020 without a win. His best finish was fourth in the October Stakes (Listed) at Tokyo.

=== 2021: Six-year-old season ===
Meiner Fanrong finished second in the Tomoe Sho (Open) at Hakodate in July. On September 5, he contested the Niigata Kinen (GIII) at Niigata Racecourse. Ridden by Mirco Demuro, he tracked the leaders from the rear and won by 0.1 seconds over Tosen Surya, recording his first graded stakes victory. He finished unplaced in his remaining three starts that year.

=== 2022: Seven-year-old season ===
Meiner Fanrong finished second in the American Jockey Club Cup (GII) at Nakayama in January. He finished sixth in the Tennō Shō (Spring, GI) and fifth in the Takarazuka Kinen (GI). He finished unplaced in his remaining two starts.

=== 2023: Eight-year-old season ===
Meiner Fanrong finished unplaced in three flat races in early 2023. He was transferred to steeplechase racing in August, finishing eighth in a hurdle maiden at Niigata. In his second steeplechase start at Nakayama on September 9, he fell at the fourth fence on the second circuit and was pulled up. He returned to flat racing and finished seventh in the Chunichi Shimbun Hai (GIII) in December.

=== 2024: Nine-year-old season and retirement ===
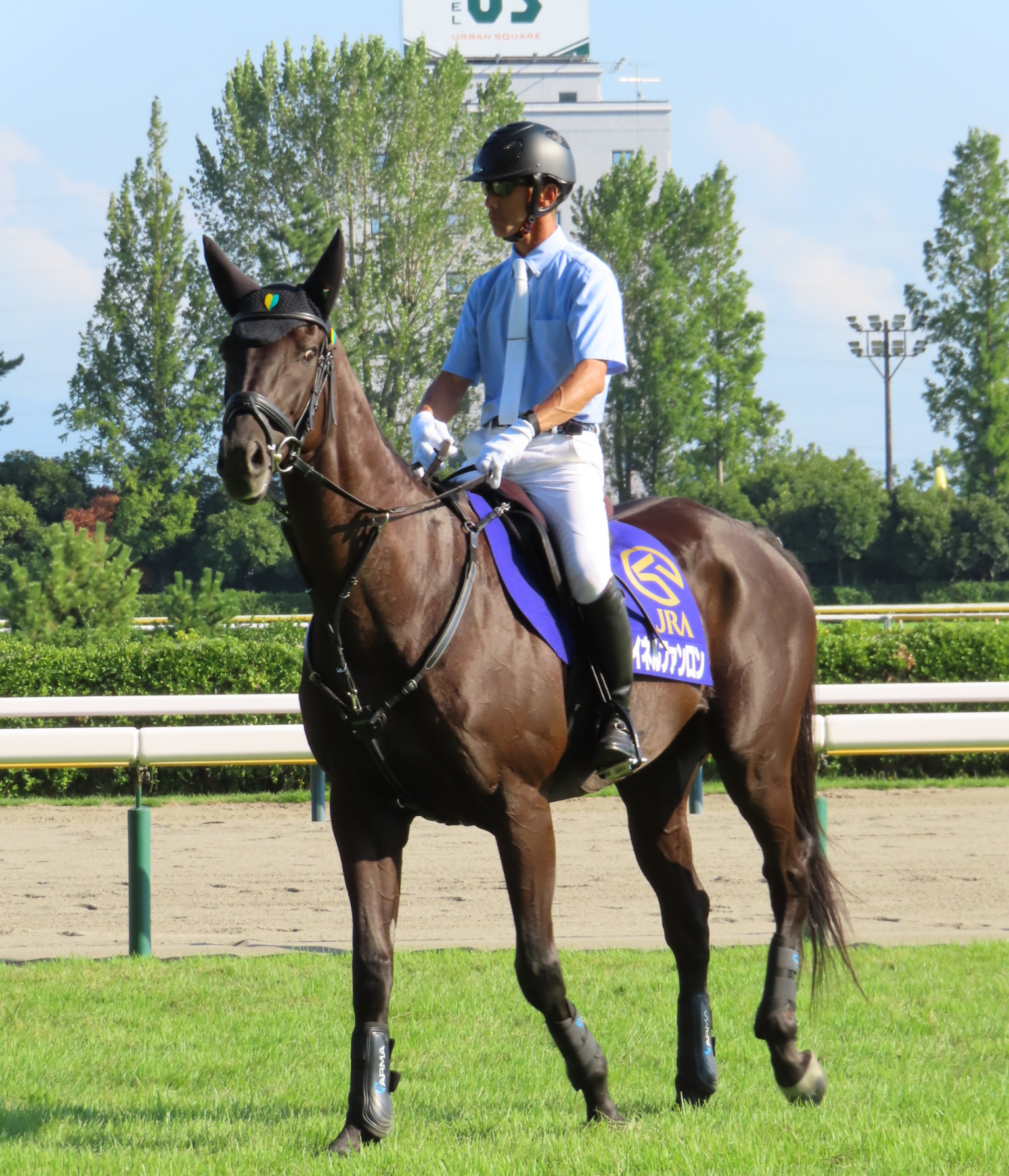
Meiner Fanrong as a lead pony in the 2025 Niigata Kinen

Meiner Fanrong ran in four races in 2024 without a win. Following a thirteenth-place finish in the Thailand Cup (Open) at Sapporo on September 1, trainer Tezuka stated that the horse's age made further improvement unlikely. His retirement was announced by owner Thoroughbred Club Ruffian on September 4, 2024. He was deregistered from JRA competition on September 6, 2024.

Following his retirement, Meiner Fanrong became a riding horse at Niigata Racecourse, with the aim of serving as a lead pony. He served as a lead pony at the 2025 Niigata Kinen.

== Statistics ==
The following table details all 48 starts of Meiner Fanrong's racing career based on official netkeiba and JBIS records.

Date	Distance (Condition)	Race	Class	Course	Odds (Favourite)	Field	Finish	Time	Jockey	Winning (Losing) Margin	Winner (2nd Place)	Ref
2017 – two-year-old season
Sep 16	Turf 1800 m (Firm)	2-Y-O Newcomer	Maiden	Nakayama	2.0 (1st)	16	2nd	1:50.3	Daichi Shibata	0.0	Spearano	
Oct 7	Turf 2000 m (Soft)	2-Y-O Maiden	Maiden	Tokyo	1.7 (1st)	13	1st	2:02.3	Daichi Shibata	–0.6	(Rose Phoenix)	
Dec 2	Turf 2000 m (Firm)	Habotan Sho	Allowance	Nakayama	5.4 (3rd)	9	3rd	2:01.5	Daichi Shibata	0.1	Generale Uno	
2018 – three-year-old season
Feb 17	Turf 2000 m (Firm)	Freesia Sho	Allowance	Tokyo	5.4 (4th)	11	2nd	2:01.6	Daichi Shibata	0.1	Gibeon	
Mar 18	Turf 1800 m (Firm)	Spring Stakes	GII	Nakayama	16.0 (6th)	13	3rd	1:48.7	Daichi Shibata	0.6	Stelvio	
Apr 15	Turf 2000 m (Good)	Satsuki Shō	GI	Nakayama	151.8 (13th)	16	13th	2:02.3	Daichi Shibata	1.5	Epoca d'Oro	
Aug 4	Turf 2000 m (Firm)	3-Y-O Allowance	Allowance	Sapporo	1.4 (1st)	13	1st	2:01.9	João Moreira	–0.7	(Cerberus)	
Aug 26	Turf 1800 m (Good)	WASJ Round 4	Allowance	Sapporo	3.4 (2nd)	14	6th	1:51.2	Shane Foley	0.9	Smart Elements	
Sep 29	Turf 2000 m (Good)	Narashino Tokubetsu	Allowance	Nakayama	2.0 (1st)	16	1st	2:01.8	João Moreira	–0.2	(Freezing Rain)	
Nov 3	Turf 2000 m (Good)	November Stakes	Allowance	Tokyo	7.0 (4th)	10	3rd	1:59.0	Daichi Shibata	0.2	Langadia	
Nov 25	Turf 2000 m (Soft)	Welcome Stakes	Allowance	Tokyo	7.6 (5th)	10	5th	1:47.2	Daichi Shibata	0.5	Up Quark	
2019 – four-year-old season
Jan 6	Turf 2000 m (Firm)	Kotobuki Stakes	Allowance	Kyoto	3.3 (3rd)	6	4th	2:01.7	Keita Tosaki	0.3	K T Clever	
Feb 17	Turf 2000 m (Firm)	Amethyst Stakes	Allowance	Tokyo	14.9 (6th)	11	5th	1:58.9	Daichi Shibata	0.6	Rochefort	
Mar 17	Turf 2000 m (Good)	Tajima Stakes	Allowance	Hanshin	6.8 (4th)	13	5th	2:02.8	Ryuji Wada	0.7	Mauve Sapphire	
Apr 6	Turf 2200 m (Firm)	Wangan Stakes	Allowance	Nakayama	5.2 (3rd)	8	1st	2:12.3	Yuji Tannai	–0.2	(Acuto)	
Jun 30	Turf 1800 m (Good)	Tomoe Sho	Open	Hakodate	10.7 (5th)	16	12th	1:48.7	Yuji Tannai	1.3	Suzuka Devious	
Jul 14	Turf 1800 m (Good)	Hakodate Kinen	GIII	Hakodate	17.6 (9th)	16	2nd	1:59.6	Yuji Tannai	0.0	My Style	
Oct 6	Turf 1800 m (Firm)	Mainichi Ōkan	GII	Tokyo	139.7 (9th)	10	10th	1:46.7	Daichi Shibata	2.3	Danon Kingly	
Nov 10	Turf 2000 m (Firm)	Fukushima Kinen	GIII	Fukushima	11.9 (5th)	16	16th	2:01.1	Yuji Tannai	1.6	Crescendo Love	
2020 – five-year-old season
Mar 15	Turf 2000 m (Firm)	Kinko Sho	GII	Chukyo	175.9 (11th)	12	8th	2:02.7	Yuji Tannai	1.1	Saturnalia	
Apr 19	Turf 2000 m (Soft)	Fukushima Minpo Hai	Listed	Fukushima	8.0 (5th)	16	5th	2:02.1	Yuji Tannai	0.3	Meiner Surpass	
Jun 14	Turf 1800 m (Heavy)	Epsom Cup	GIII	Tokyo	31.9 (12th)	18	12th	1:49.8	Kosei Miura	2.1	Daiwa Cagney	
Jul 19	Turf 2000 m (Firm)	Hakodate Kinen	GIII	Hakodate	22.6 (10th)	16	14th	2:01.5	Yuji Tannai	1.8	Admire Justa	
Oct 18	Turf 2000 m (Good)	October Stakes	Listed	Tokyo	46.0 (12th)	16	4th	2:00.3	Daichi Shibata	0.8	Territorial	
Nov 15	Turf 2000 m (Firm)	Fukushima Kinen	GIII	Fukushima	36.5 (14th)	16	15th	2:00.9	Kanichiro Fujii	1.3	Bio Spark	
Dec 20	Turf 1800 m (Firm)	December Stakes	Listed	Nakayama	57.0 (10th)	15	6th	1:49.7	Yuji Tannai	0.5	Taurus Gemini	
2021 – six-year-old season
Jan 30	Turf 2000 m (Firm)	Shirafuji Stakes	Listed	Tokyo	82.9 (12th)	13	11th	1:59.9	Daichi Shibata	0.9	Potager	
Jul 4	Turf 1800 m (Firm)	Tomoe Sho	Open	Hakodate	19.1 (7th)	13	2nd	1:48.0	Yuji Tannai	0.0	Satono Eldor	
Jul 18	Turf 2000 m (Firm)	Hakodate Kinen	GIII	Hakodate	19.9 (7th)	16	14th	2:00.6	Toshiki Akiyama	1.9	Tosen Surya	
Sep 5	Turf 2000 m (Firm)	Niigata Kinen	GIII	Niigata	42.8 (12th)	17	1st	1:58.4	Mirco Demuro	–0.1	(Tosen Surya)	
Oct 10	Turf 1800 m (Firm)	Mainichi Ōkan	GII	Tokyo	61.5 (13th)	13	12th	1:46.0	Takeshi Yokoyama	1.2	Schnell Meister	
Nov 14	Turf 2000 m (Firm)	Fukushima Kinen	GIII	Fukushima	40.2 (14th)	16	8th	2:00.5	Masami Matsuoka	1.3	Panthalassa	
Dec 11	Turf 2000 m (Firm)	Chunichi Shimbun Hai	GIII	Chukyo	62.0 (14th)	18	17th	2:01.0	Masami Matsuoka	1.2	Shonan Baldi	
2022 – seven-year-old season
Jan 23	Turf 2200 m (Firm)	American Jockey Club Cup	GII	Nakayama	87.9 (11th)	14	2nd	2:12.9	Masami Matsuoka	0.2	King of Coji	
May 1	Turf 3200 m (Good)	Tennō Shō (Spring)	GI	Hanshin	82.9 (14th)	18	6th	3:18.7	Masami Matsuoka	2.5	Titleholder	
Jun 26	Turf 2200 m (Firm)	Takarazuka Kinen	GI	Hanshin	175.2 (14th)	17	5th	2:10.6	Mirco Demuro	0.9	Titleholder	
Oct 10	Turf 2400 m (Good)	Kyoto Daishoten	GII	Hanshin	13.0 (8th)	14	14th	2:26.6	Mirco Demuro	2.3	Vela Azul	
Nov 6	Turf 2500 m (Firm)	Copa Republica Argentina	GII	Tokyo	65.5 (15th)	18	15th	2:32.5	Mirco Demuro	1.4	Break Up	
2023 – eight-year-old season
Feb 12	Turf 2200 m (Firm)	Kyoto Kinen	GII	Hanshin	141.4 (11th)	13	12th	2:12.6	Yoshihiko Kawasu	1.7	Do Deuce	
Mar 25	Turf 2500 m (Heavy)	Nikkei Shō	GII	Nakayama	63.3 (8th)	12	8th	2:39.2	Yuji Tannai	2.4	Titleholder	
Jun 3	Turf 2000 m (Firm)	Naruo Kinen	GIII	Hanshin	122.8 (11th)	15	11th	1:59.7	Ryusei Sakai	0.6	Boccherini	
Aug 13	Hurdle 2850 m (Firm)	3-Y-O Hurdle Maiden	Maiden	Niigata	3.1 (1st)	14	8th	3:10.8	Yasunori Minoshima	4.7	Sakura Top Run	
Sep 9	Hurdle 2880 m (Soft)	3-Y-O Hurdle Maiden	Maiden	Nakayama	6.7 (3rd)	12	DNF	–	Yasunori Minoshima	–	Osiris Brain	
Dec 9	Turf 2000 m (Firm)	Chunichi Shimbun Hai	GIII	Chukyo	117.8 (15th)	17	7th	1:59.3	Genki Maruyama	0.5	Yamanin Salvum	
2024 – nine-year-old season
Jan 6	Turf 2000 m (Firm)	Nakayama Kimpai	GIII	Nakayama	134.6 (15th)	17	10th	1:59.5	Genki Maruyama	0.6	Licancabur	
Feb 18	Turf 1800 m (Firm)	Kokura Daishoten	GIII	Kokura	73.2 (13th)	15	13th	1:46.5	Genki Maruyama	1.4	Epiphany	
Apr 14	Turf 2000 m (Firm)	Fukushima Minpo Hai	Listed	Fukushima	74.6 (14th)	16	14th	2:00.0	Masami Matsuoka	1.1	Reframing	
Sep 1	Turf 2600 m (Good)	Thailand Cup	Open	Sapporo	88.4 (13th)	14	13th	2:44.5	Yuji Tannai	3.0	Shonan Bashit	

== In popular culture ==
Meiner Fanrong appeared as the horse "Winged Yell" in the first episode of the television drama Passing the Reins, broadcast on TBS in October 2025. Jockey Yutaka Take, who appeared in a cameo role, rode the horse in the scene.

In 2024, Meiner Fanrong won the "Idol Horse Audition 2024" conducted by the JRA Public Relations Center, receiving 13,469 votes in the active horse category. A plush toy of the horse was subsequently produced.

== Pedigree ==
Pedigree of Meiner Fanrong (JPN)
Sire Stay Gold (JPN) 1994	Sunday Silence (USA); 1986	Halo	Hail to Reason
Sire Stay Gold (JPN) 1994	Sunday Silence (USA); 1986	Halo	Cosmah
Sire Stay Gold (JPN) 1994	Sunday Silence (USA); 1986	Wishing Well	Understanding
Sire Stay Gold (JPN) 1994	Sunday Silence (USA); 1986	Wishing Well	Mountain Flower
Sire Stay Gold (JPN) 1994	Golden Sash (JPN); 1988	Dictus	Sanctus
Sire Stay Gold (JPN) 1994	Golden Sash (JPN); 1988	Dictus	Doronic
Sire Stay Gold (JPN) 1994	Golden Sash (JPN); 1988	Dyna Sash	Northern Taste
Sire Stay Gold (JPN) 1994	Golden Sash (JPN); 1988	Dyna Sash	Royal Sash
Dam Meiner Theresia (JPN) 2007	Roses in May (USA); 2000	Devil His Due	Devil's Bag
Dam Meiner Theresia (JPN) 2007	Roses in May (USA); 2000	Devil His Due	Plenty O'Toole
Dam Meiner Theresia (JPN) 2007	Roses in May (USA); 2000	Tell a Secret	Speak John
Dam Meiner Theresia (JPN) 2007	Roses in May (USA); 2000	Tell a Secret	Secret Retreat
Dam Meiner Theresia (JPN) 2007	Meiner Nouvelle (JPN); 2000	Brian's Time	Roberto
Dam Meiner Theresia (JPN) 2007	Meiner Nouvelle (JPN); 2000	Brian's Time	Kelley's Day
Dam Meiner Theresia (JPN) 2007	Meiner Nouvelle (JPN); 2000	Meiner Pretender	Zabeel
Dam Meiner Theresia (JPN) 2007	Meiner Nouvelle (JPN); 2000	Meiner Pretender	Giladah

- Meiner Fanrong is inbred 3 × 5 to Halo and 4 × 5 to Hail to Reason.
- His half-sister Uberleben (by Gold Ship) won the 2021 Yūshun Himba (GI).
- His half-brother Meiner Emperor (by Gold Ship) won the 2025 Nikkei Shō (GII).
- His dam Meiner Nouvelle won the 2003 Flower Cup (GIII).

== See also ==
- Thoroughbred racing in Japan
- Niigata Kinen
