= Roses In May =

American Thoroughbred racehorse (2000–2025)

- Sire: Devil His Due
- Grandsire: Devil's Bag
- Dam: Tell A Secret
- Damsire: Speak John
- Sex: Stallion
- Foaled: February 9, 2000
- Died: March 4, 2025 (aged 25)
- Country: United States
- Colour: Brown/Black
- Breeder: Margaux Farm
- Owner: Kenneth L. and Sarah K. Ramsey
- Trainer: Dale L. Romans
- Record: 13: 8-4-0
- Earnings: $5,490,187

Major wins
- Whitney Handicap (2004); Kentucky Cup Classic Handicap (2004); Cornhusker Breeders' Cup Handicap (2004); Dubai World Cup (2005)

Roses In May (February 9, 2000 – March 4, 2025) was an American Thoroughbred racehorse who won 8 of his 13 races, including the 2005 Dubai World Cup, and earned $5,490,187.

== Background ==
Roses In May, a black horse with a white star and snip, was bred by Margaux Farm in Midway, Kentucky. He was sired by Devil His Due, a multiple Gr.I winning stallion whose progeny earnings have totaled more than $53 million. Roses In May closely resembled his sire. His dam, Tell a Secret, was multiple Gr.3-placed, and produced several other stakes horses. Broodmare sire Speak John was a graded stakes winner who was Leading Broodmare Sire of 1985.

He was bought by Danzel Brendemuehl of Classic Bloodstock at the Keeneland Yearling Sale in September 2001 as a pinhook. Subsequently, he was sold by Classic Bloodstock at the OBS April 2002 two-year-old in training sale and purchased by Dave Lambert on behalf of Ken and Sarah Ramsey, who owned him during his racing career.

He was trained by Dale Romans and ridden in his most important races by jockey John Velazquez.

== Racing career ==
Roses In May did not race as a juvenile. He broke his maiden in his second start as a sophomore at Churchill Downs, and won another race before contesting the Jerome Stakes in September. He finished sixth.

When he was four, he won the Grade I Whitney Handicap, the Grade II Kentucky Cup Classic Handicap, and the Grade III Cornhusker Breeders' Cup Handicap. He came second in that year's (2004) Grade I Breeders' Cup Classic to Horse of the Year, Ghostzapper.

At five years of age, after placing in the Grade I Donn Handicap, won by Saint Liam, Roses In May was sent to Dubai for the world's richest horse race, the US$6,000,000 Dubai World Cup at Nad Al Sheba Racecourse in Dubai. Roses In May was favoured to win in the 2,000 metre race despite a poor draw. Roses In May broke slowly, but made up the lost ground and moved round the outside of the field to take the lead in the straight. He needed "little encouragement" to draw clear and win by three lengths from Dynever and Choctaw Nation.

The horse was the forty-third international winner at the 2005 Dubai International Racing Carnival. The carnival began on January 20, 2005, and concluded with the race for the Cup. In all, 200 horses and their trainers from twenty countries came to Dubai to compete for a total of US$25,000,000 in prize money.

His win in Dubai proved to be his last race: in August 2005, veterinarian Steve Allday determined that Roses In May had sustained a tendon injury, which ended his racing career.

== Stud record ==
Roses In May was retired on August 19, 2005, when a tendon tear was discovered in his left foreleg. It was announced the following May that he would stand in Japan at Big Red Farm.

He was at Big Red Farm in Niikappu, Hokkaido, Japan with a stud fee of 500,000JPY.

His top progeny include:

- Dream Valentino: Hakodate Sprint Stakes (JPN-G3), Silk Road Stakes (JPN-G3), Hyogo Gold Trophy (JPN-G3), and JBC Sprint (JPN-L). Placed in the Sprinters Stakes (JPN-G1), Takamatsunomiya Kinen (JPN-G1), and Centaur Stakes (JPN-G2).
- Summit Stone: Urawa Kinen (JPN-L), Chunichi Hai Stakes, Kanazawa Sprint Cup, and Inuwashi Sho. Placed in the Tokyo Daishōten (JPN-G1) and Kawasaki Kinen (JPN-G1 among multiple listed stakes. 2014 NAR Grand Prix Award for Horse of the Year and Best Thoroughbred Older Colt or Horse.
- Cosmo Ozora: Hochi Hai Yayoi Sho (JPN-G2). Fourth in the Satsuki Shō (JPN-G1).
- Rose Princedom: Leopard Stakes (JPN-G3).
- Cosmo Thorn Park: Kokura Daishoten (JPN-G3) and New Year Stakes (JPN-L). Multiple stakes placed.
- Meiner Baika: Brazil Cup (JPN-L), Hakusan Daishoten (JPN-L), Betelgeuse Stakes (JPN-L). Placed in Tokai TV Hai Tokai Stakes (JPN-G2) and Heian Stakes (JPN-G3).
- Rose Julep: Crown Cup (JPN-L) and Hyogo Junior Grand Prix (JPN-L).
- Win Mut: Sakitama Hai (JPN-G2), Hyogo Gold Trophy (JPN-G3)
- Crazy Accel: Queen Sho (JPN-G3); winner of the NAR Best Thoroughbred Older Mare.
- Ho O Roulette: Sirius Stakes (JPN-G3), Hakusan Daishoten (JPN-L) and Urawa Kinen (JPN-L).

In addition, he is also the damsire of Meiner Fanrong, who won the Niigata Kinen in 2021, as well as his half-sister Uberleben, who won the Yushun Himba in 2021, and Uberleben's full brother Meiner Emperor, who won the 2025 Nikkei Sho.

== Retirement and death ==
Big Red Farm announced on February 10, 2025, that Roses in May would be retired from stud duty and be pensioned citing health reasons.

Less than a month later, Big Red Farm announced that the horse died on March 4 due to the horse's health declining, stating that the horse had been suffering from Wobbler disease since at least earlier that year.

== Pedigree ==
Pedigree of Roses in May
Sire Devil His Due dk. b. 1989	Devil's Bag b. 1981	Halo	Hail to Reason
Sire Devil His Due dk. b. 1989	Devil's Bag b. 1981	Halo	Cosmah
Sire Devil His Due dk. b. 1989	Devil's Bag b. 1981	Ballade	Herbager
Sire Devil His Due dk. b. 1989	Devil's Bag b. 1981	Ballade	Miss Swapsco
Sire Devil His Due dk. b. 1989	Plenty o'Toole dk. b. 1977	Raise a Cup	Raise a Native
Sire Devil His Due dk. b. 1989	Plenty o'Toole dk. b. 1977	Raise a Cup	Spring Sunshine
Sire Devil His Due dk. b. 1989	Plenty o'Toole dk. b. 1977	Li'l Puss	Noble Jay
Sire Devil His Due dk. b. 1989	Plenty o'Toole dk. b. 1977	Li'l Puss	Li'l Sis
Dam Tell a Secret dk. b. 1977	Speak John b. 1958	Prince John	Princequillo
Dam Tell a Secret dk. b. 1977	Speak John b. 1958	Prince John	Not Afraid
Dam Tell a Secret dk. b. 1977	Speak John b. 1958	Nuit de Folies	Tornado
Dam Tell a Secret dk. b. 1977	Speak John b. 1958	Nuit de Folies	Folle Nuit
Dam Tell a Secret dk. b. 1977	Secret Retreat b. 1968	Clandestine	Double Jay
Dam Tell a Secret dk. b. 1977	Secret Retreat b. 1968	Clandestine	Conniver
Dam Tell a Secret dk. b. 1977	Secret Retreat b. 1968	Retirement	Royal Gem
Dam Tell a Secret dk. b. 1977	Secret Retreat b. 1968	Retirement	Marie J.
