= Gold Ship =

Japanese-bred Thoroughbred racehorse

Gold Ship ゴールドシップ
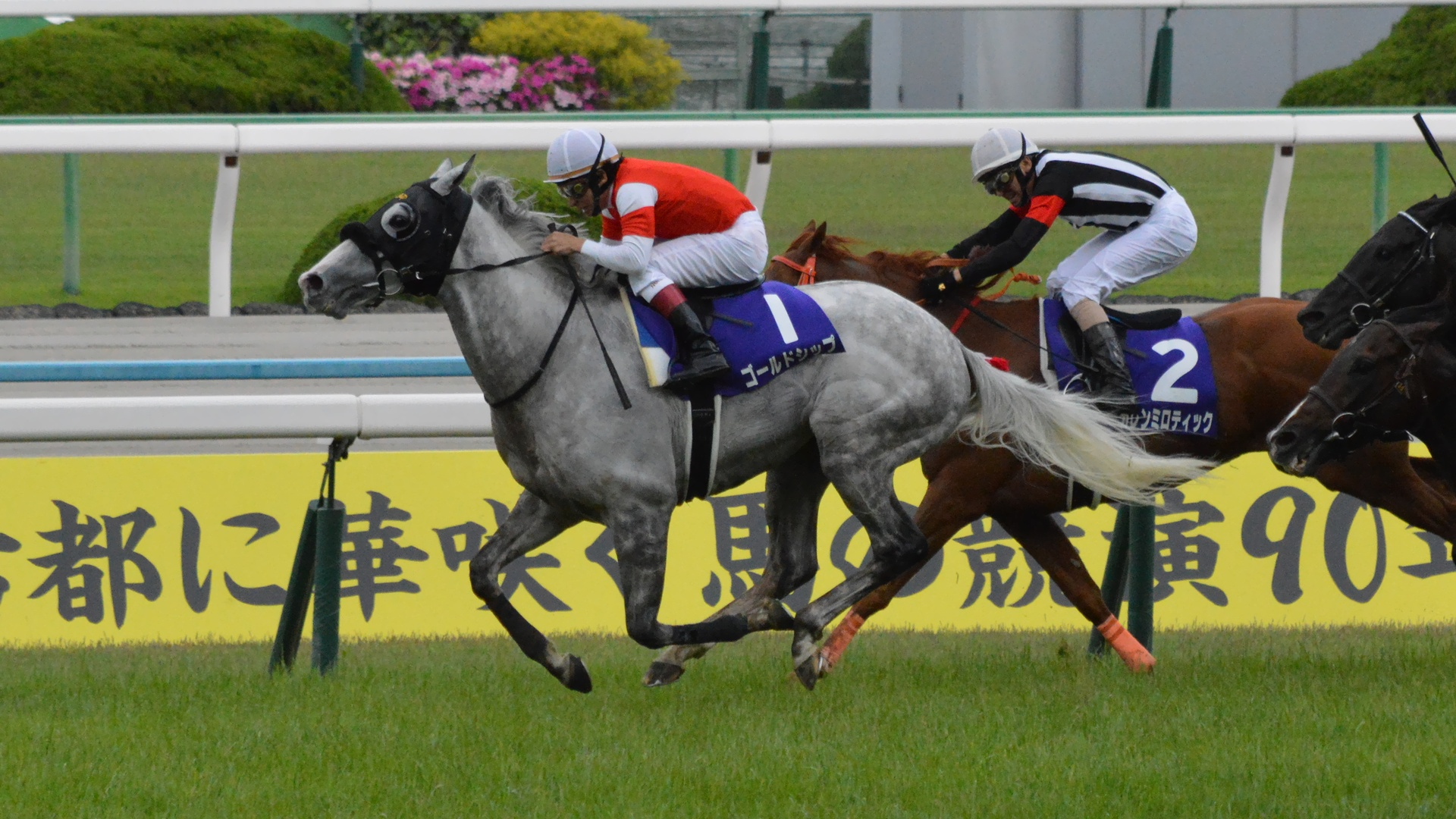
- Gold Ship at the Spring Tennō Shō in 2015.
- Breed: Thoroughbred
- Sire: Stay Gold (JPN)
- Grandsire: Sunday Silence (USA)
- Dam: Point Flag (JPN)
- Damsire: Mejiro McQueen (JPN)
- Sex: Stallion
- Foaled: March 6, 2009 (age 17); Deguchi Farm, Hidaka, Hokkaido, Japan
- Country: Japan
- Colour: Grey
- Breeder: Deguchi Bokujo
- Owner: Eiichi Kobayashi
- Racing colours
- Trainer: Naosuke Sugai
- Jockey: Hiroyuki Uchida; Yasunari Iwata; Norihiro Yokoyama
- Record: 28: 13-3-2
- Earnings: ¥1,397,767,000 (US$8,818,440)

Major wins
- Kyodo Tsushin Hai (2012); Kobe Shimbun Hai (2012); Arima Kinen (2012); Hanshin Daishoten (2013, 2014, 2015); Takarazuka Kinen (2013, 2014); Tennō Shō (Spring) (2015); Japanese Classic Race wins: Satsuki Shō (2012); Kikuka Shō (2012)

Awards
- JRA Award for Best Three-Year-Old Colt (2012)

Gold Ship (Japanese: ゴールドシップ, Hepburn: Gōrudo Shippu; foaled 6 March 2009) is a retired Japanese Thoroughbred racehorse and sire. In a racing career which began in July 2011, he ran twenty-eight times and won thirteen races. As a two-year-old in 2011, he won two of his four races. In 2012, he won the Satsuki Shō and the Kikuka Shō, the first and third legs of the Japanese Triple Crown. In December, he defeated a strong field in the weight-for-age invitational Arima Kinen, which led to his being rated the best three-year-old racehorse in the world by some authorities. As a four-year-old, he ran disappointingly in the Tennō Shō but returned to form to win the Takarazuka Kinen. As a five-year-old, Gold Ship became the first horse to record a second victory in the Takarazuka Kinen and in 2015 he added a win in the Tennō Shō. He is known for his unpredictable temperament, with major wins being interspersed with inexplicably poor efforts.

== Background ==
Gold Ship is a light-coloured grey stallion bred in Japan by his owner Eiichi Kobayashi. His sire, Stay Gold, a son of the thirteen-time leading sire in Japan Sunday Silence, was a successful international performer, winning the Dubai Sheema Classic and the Hong Kong Vase. Standing at stud at the Big Red Farm in Hokkaido, he produced numerous important winners including Dream Journey, Orfevre, Nakayama Festa, Fenomeno, and Oju Chosan. Gold Ship's dam, Point Flag, from whom he inherited his grey coat, was a daughter of the Hall of Fame inductee Mejiro McQueen.

Point Flag was a large horse, weighing well over 500 kg during her career, with her previous offspring reaching similar sizes. On the other hand, Stay Gold was much the opposite, short and light, being only 161 cm in height and under 450 kg during his racing career, but had a much stronger and more resilient body. By pairing the two, it had been hoped by the breeders at Deguchi Bokujo farm that it would result in a horse that would be more average sized and therefore less prone to the same leg problems that Point Flag had faced due to her size. The experiment was a failure; while Gold Ship inherited his sire's hardy constitution, he also inherited his dam's size; even when young, Gold Ship was big enough to stand out amongst the other horses his age.

== Racing career ==
=== 2011: two-year-old season ===
Gold Ship began his racing career in Hokkaido by winning a maiden race at Hakodate Racecourse on 9 July and followed up with a win in the nine-furlong Cosmos Shō at Sapporo Racecourse on 10 September. He was then moved up to Grade Three class to contest the Sapporo Nisai Stakes over the same course and distance on 1 October. He started at odds of 7/2 and finished second, half a length behind the winner, Grandezza. On his only other start of the season, he finished second to Adam's Peak in the Grade Three Radio Nikkei Hai Nisai Stakes over ten furlongs at Hanshin Racecourse on 24 December.

=== 2012: three-year-old season ===
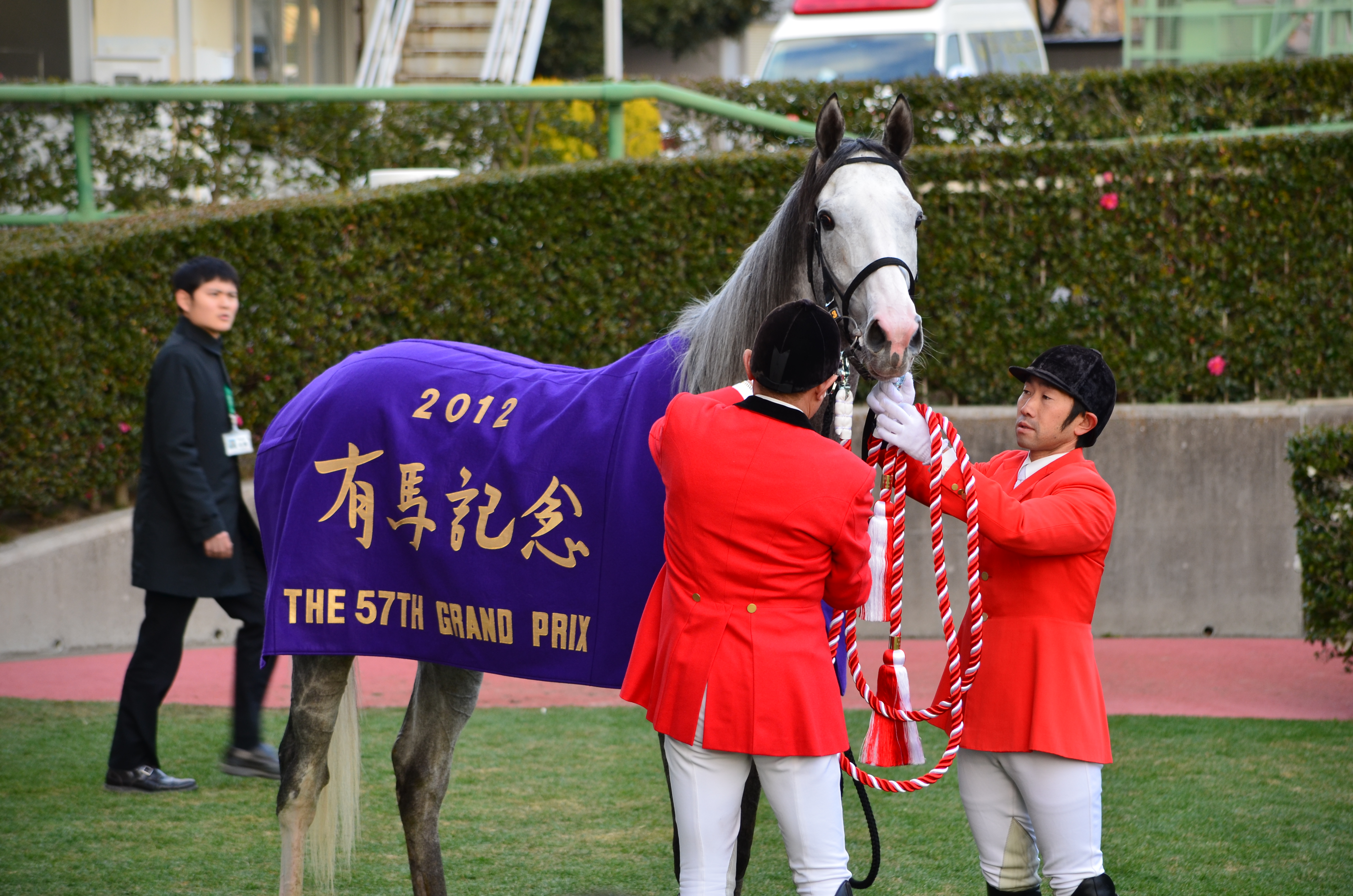
Gold Ship after winning the 2012 Arima Kinen

On his first appearance as a three-year-old, Gold Ship contested the Grade Three Kyodo Tsushin Hai at Tokyo Racecourse in February. Ridden for the first time by Hiroyuki Uchida, he overtook the leader, Deep Brillante, inside the final furlong to record his first win by one and three quarter lengths. In April at Nakayama Racecourse Gold Ship started at odds of 6.1/1 for the Satsuki Shō, the first leg of the Japanese Triple Crown. Apparently relishing the extremely wet conditions, he came from last place to take the lead in the straight and won by two and a half lengths from World Ace and Deep Brilante, with Grandezza and Adam's Peak unplaced. For Gold Ship's jockey, Uchida, this Satsuki Shō marked his first victory after recovering from a broken back sustained in a fall in May 2011. Gold Ship was made the 2.1/1 second favourite for the Tokyo Yushun (Japanese Derby) over one and a half miles and finished fifth, one and a half lengths behind the winner, Deep Brillante.

Gold Ship returned from the summer break in the Grade Two Kobe Shimbun Hai, a trial race for the Kikuka-shō (Japanese St Leger), at Hanshin on 27 September. He started the 1.3/1 favourite and won by two and a half lengths from fifteen opponents. A month later, he started odds-on favourite for the Kikuka-shō over fifteen furlongs at Kyoto Racecourse and won by one and three quarter lengths from Sky Dignity. As in the Satsuki Shō, the colt came from last place before he "cruised" to victory, although the competition was less strong than anticipated following the late withdrawal of Deep Brillante, who had sustained a tendon injury.

Gold Ship was one of sixteen horses to be invited to contest the all-aged Arima Kinen at Nakayama on 23 December. He was towards the back of the field before moving up on the wide outside on the approach to the straight. In the closing stages, he overtook the leaders and won by one and a half lengths from Ocean Blue, with Uchida standing up in the irons and saluting the crowd as he crossed the line. Naosuke Sugai said that the horse would stay in Japan in 2013 before challenging for international races such as the Dubai World Cup and Prix de l'Arc de Triomphe in 2014, saying that "this is just the beginning for him". Britain's Racing Post described the winner's performance as "a stunning display" whilst pointing out that Japan's other two outstanding middle-distance horses, Orfevre and Gentildonna, had bypassed the race.

=== 2013: four-year-old season ===
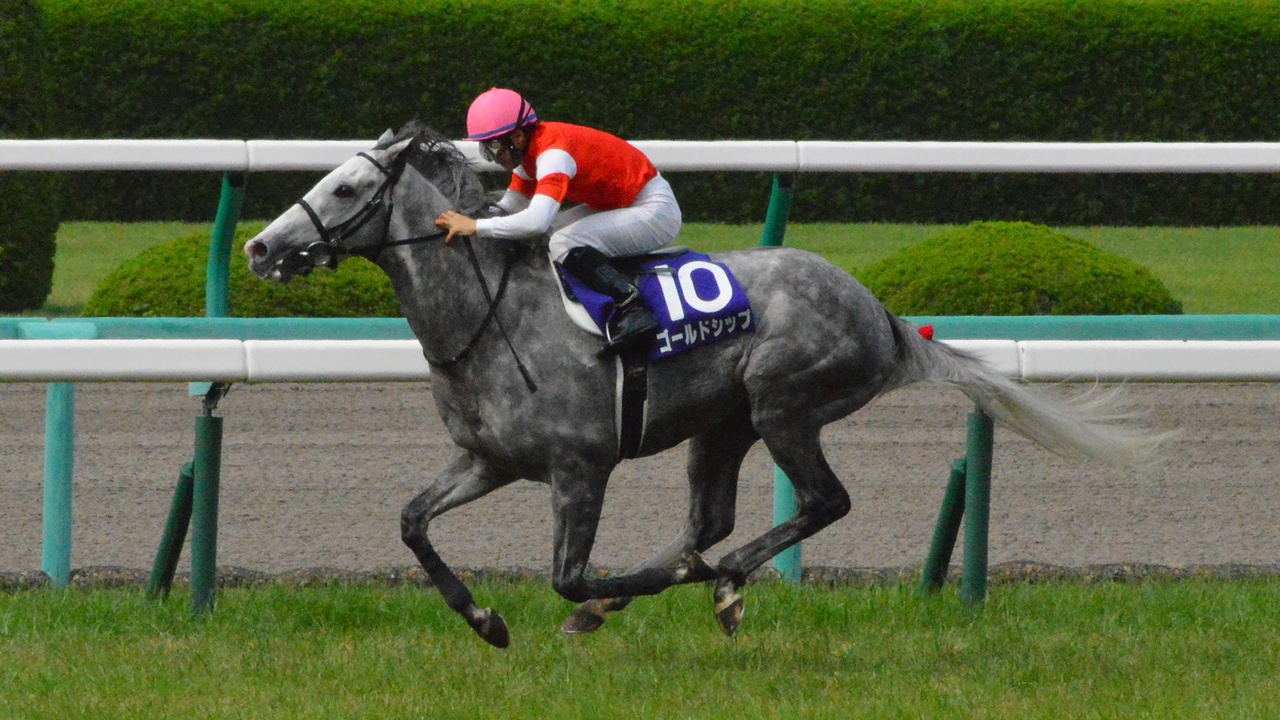
Gold Ship at the 2013 Takarazuka Kinen

Gold Ship began his four-year-old season on 17 March in the Grade Two Hanshin Daishoten, a trial race for the Spring Tennō Shō. Starting at odds of 1/10 he won the fourteen-furlong race by two lengths from Desperado. On 28 April, the colt was moved up further in distance for the two-mile Spring Tennō Shō at Kyoto. He started odds-on favourite and finished fifth of the eighteen runners behind Fenomeno. On 23 June, Gold Ship met Fenomeno again in the Takarazuka Kinen at Hanshin Racecourse where the field, which was decided by public ballot, also included Gentildonna. Orfevre was withdrawn from the race after bleeding after an exercise gallop on 14 June. Uchida positioned the grey just behind the early leaders before moving up on the outside in the straight. He hit the front inside the final furlong and drew clear to win by three and a half lengths from the five-year-old Danon Ballade, with Gentildonna third and Fenomeno fourth.

Gold Ship's autumn campaign began in the Grade II Kyoto Daishoten on 2 October. He was made the 1/5 favourite and finished fifth of the thirteen runners behind the 165/1 outsider HIt The Target. Sugai offered several explanations for the colt's poor run, including the unseasonably hot weather, the fast track, and an unfavourable draw. On 24 November, Gold Ship started second favourite behind Gentildonna for the Japan Cup. He was never in contention at any stage and finished fifteenth of the seventeen runners. For the horse's last race of the year, the British jockey Ryan Moore took over from Uchida in the Arima Kinen. He started at odds of 17/5 and finished third behind Orfevre and Win Variation.

=== 2014: five-year-old season ===
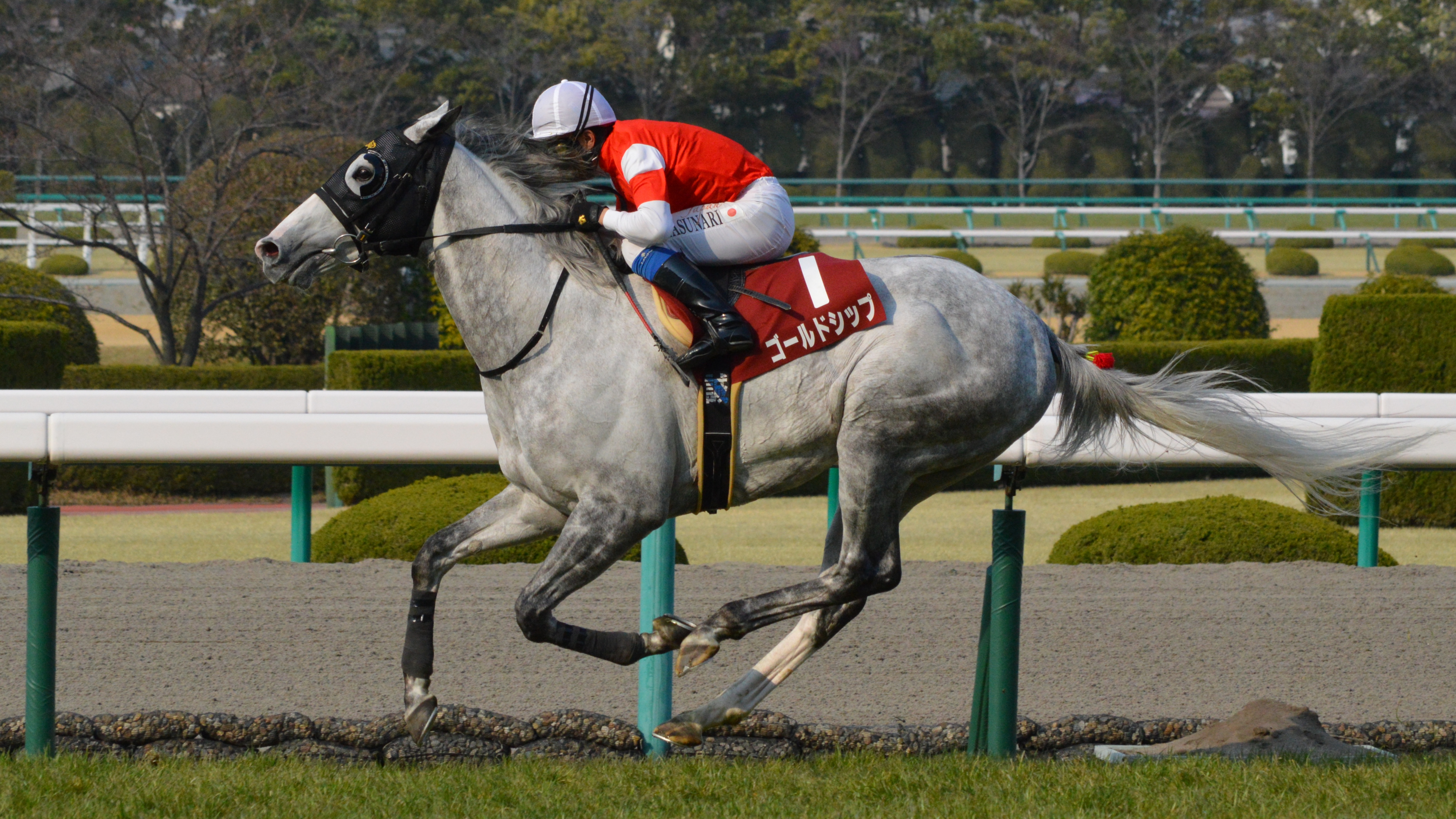
Gold Ship at the 2014 Hanshin Daishoten

Gold Ship began his fourth season by repeating his 2013 success in the Hanshin Daishoten: he started the 7/10 favourite and won by three and a half lengths from Admire Rakti. On 4 May, Gold Ship started 3.3/1 second favourite for the Tennō Shō but was never near enough to challenge and finished seventh of the eighteen runners behind Fenomeno. On 29 June at Hanshin, he attempted to become the first horse to record back-to-back victories in the Takarazuka Kinen. Ridden by Norihiro Yokoyama, he started the 17/10 favourite in a field of twelve which included Gentildonna, Meisho Mambo, Tosen Jordan, Verxina, Denim And Ruby, and Win Variation. Gold Ship started poorly but recovered well and raced behind the leaders on the outside before taking the lead in the straight. He drew away in the closing stages to win by three lengths from the 55/1 outsider Curren Mirotic. After the race, Yokoyama said, "He's a clever horse and whether he performs well or not depends on his mood. So I'm relieved that he lived up to the expectations of many fans".

Gold Ship was then aimed at the Prix de l'Arc de Triomphe in France and began his preparation for the race with a run in the Grade 2 Sapporo Kinen over ten furlongs at Sapporo Racecourse on 24 August. He finished second, beaten three-quarters of a length by Oka Shō winner Harp Star. Sugai said that it was "no disgrace to fail" when attempting to concede eleven pounds to the three-year-old filly. In the Arc de Triomphe on 5 October, Gold Ship started at odds of 12.9/1 in a three-horse Japanese challenge which also included Harp Star and Just A Way. After becoming agitated in the pre-race parade, he started poorly and raced at the back of the twenty-runner field for most of the way. He made some progress in the straight but never looked likely to make a serious challenge and finished fourteenth of the twenty runners, seven lengths behind the winner, Treve. Shortly after his return from Europe, Gold Ship topped the poll to decide the runners for the Arima Kinen. At Nakayama on 28 December he started the favourite for the Arima Kinen ahead of Epiphaneia, Just A Way and Gentildonna. He made steady progress on the outside in the straight but was unable to reach the leaders and finished third, beaten three quarters of a length and a nose by Gentildonna and To The World.

=== 2015: six-year-old season ===
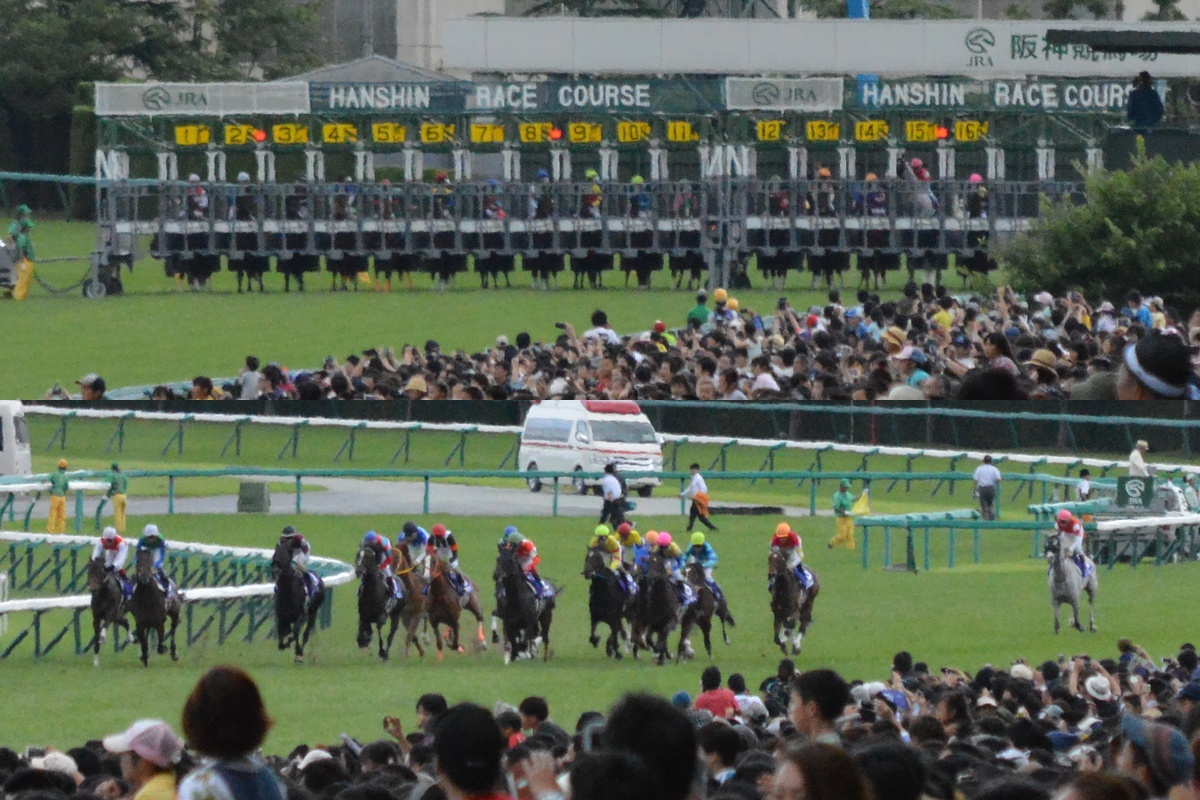
Gold Ship at the 2015 Takarazuka Kinen

On his first appearance of the new year, Gold Ship produced what the Racing Post described as a "dismal display" when finishing unplaced in the American Jockey Club Cup at Nakayama on 25 January. On 23 March, Gold Ship recorded his first success of his 2015 campaign by winning the Hanshin Daishoten for the third consecutive time. On 4 May, he made his third attempt to win the spring edition of the Tennō Shō and started second favourite behind Kizuna in a seventeen-runner field. He started slowly and was towards the rear for the first half of the race, but made rapid progress on the back straight and turned for home in fourth place. Curren Mirotic opened up a clear lead, but Gold Ship produced a sustained run to take the lead in the final strides and won by a neck from the fast-finishing Fame Game. After the race Yokoyama said "I was thinking of going front if he started well, which obviously was not the case. From there on, I just concentrated on following the pace and careful not to turn him off. In the straight, he really showed his stamina and perseverance". On 28 June, the grey started 9/10 favourite as he attempted a record third win in the Takarazuka Kinen. In what would later be referred to as the "12 billion yen incident", Gold Ship appeared to panic in the starting stalls. He lost many lengths at the start and finished fifteenth of the sixteen runners behind Lovely Day. This is estimated to have lost 12 billion yen ($135 million) in betting tickets. Yokoyama commented "I'm not sure what had happened in his mind because he can't tell us... he is just Gold Ship".

Gold Ship returned in the autumn of 2015 for two more races before retirement. On 29 November he started the 3.7/1 second favourite for the Japan Cup. He finished tenth but was only three lengths behind the winner Shonan Pandora. He ended his racing career by running for the fourth time in the Arima Kinen on 27 December. He was made 3.1/1 favourite but finished eighth of the sixteen runners behind Gold Actor. Gold Ship's retirement ceremony followed the race.

== Assessment and awards ==
Following his win in the 2012 Arima Kinen, the Racing Post rated Gold Ship the best three-year-old in the world, one pound ahead of Camelot, I'll Have Another, and Dullahan. Although he finished a distant second to the filly Gentildonna in the vote for Japanese Horse of the Year, he was the unanimous winner of the JRA Award for Best Three-Year-Old Colt. In the 2012 edition of the World Thoroughbred Racehorse Rankings Gold Ship was rated the second-best three-year-old colt, one pound behind I'll Have Another, and the thirteenth best horse in the world.

In 2013, Gold Ship was rated the eleventh-best racehorse in the world in the World's Best Racehorse Rankings and the equal second best four-year-old behind Novellist and level with Declaration of War. He was again rated eleventh in the 2014 edition of the rankings.

In the JRA Awards for 2014, Gold Ship finished third to Just A Way and Epiphaneia in the poll for the JRA Award for Best Older Male Horse.

== Stud record ==
As of 2026, Gold Ship stands at Big Red Farm in Niikappu, Hokkaido at a stud fee of JPY 5,000,000.

=== Notable progeny ===
c = colt, f = filly, g = gelding

Foaled	Name	Sex	Major wins
2017	Black Hole	c	Sapporo Nisai Stakes
2017	Win Kiitos	f	Meguro Kinen
2017	Win Mighty	f	Mermaid Stakes
2018	Uberleben	f	Yushun Himba
2018	Meiner Grand	c	Tokyo High Jump, Nakayama Daishogai, Hanshin Spring Jump
2020	Golden Hind	f	Flora Stakes
2020	Verehrung	f	Kokura Himba Stakes
2020	Meiner Emperor	c	Nikkei Sho
2021	Meisho Tabaru	c	Mainichi Hai, Kobe Shimbun Hai, Takarazuka Kinen (twice)
2021	Koganeno Sora	f	Queen Stakes, Fukushima Himba Stakes

== In popular culture ==
An anthropomorphized version of Gold Ship appears as a character in the Japanese multimedia franchise Umamusume: Pretty Derby, voiced by Hitomi Ueda. She appears as a tall, silver-haired teenage girl or young woman of the same name, with a mischievous streak and an unpredictable personality. She appears both as a recruitable trainee in the game and as one of the main characters in the anime, as well as being the main host of the series' official YouTube channel (which began activities in 2018). The series' popularity helped reignite public interest in the featured racehorses, with Gold Ship in particular attracting heavy interest. He came in 5th place at the "2021 Net Buzz Word of the Year" while his Umamusume counterpart came in 2nd place. In addition, a comedy manga spinoff featuring the character titled Uma Musume Pretty Derby PisuPisu☆SupiSupi Golshi-chan launched on CoroCoro Comic's website in November 2023.

== Racing record ==
The following results are tabulated from netkeiba, the JRA, and JBIS Search.

Date	Age	Track	Race	Grade	Distance (Condition)	Field	Odds (Favourite)	Finish	Time	Winning (Losing) Margin	Jockey	Winner (2nd Place)	Ref
9 Jul, 2011	2	Hakodate	Two Year Old Debut		Turf 1800 m (Firm)	10	7.0 (2nd)	1st	R1:51.1	head	Shinichiro Akiyama	(Cosmo Yucca)	
10 Sep, 2011	2	Sapporo	Cosmos Sho	OP	Turf 1800 m (Firm)	8	1.2 (1st)	1st	1:53.6	3/4 length	Shinichiro Akiyama	(Nishinokachizukusi)	
1 Oct, 2011	2	Sapporo	Sapporo Nisai Stakes	GIII	Turf 1800 m (Good)	13	4.5 (2nd)	2nd	1:50.9	(1/2 length)	Katsumi Ando	Grandezza	
24 Dec, 2011	2	Hanshin	Radio Nikkei Hai Nisai Stakes	GIII	Turf 2000 m (Firm)	16	5.9 (3rd)	2nd	2:02.6	(1 1/2 lengths)	Katsumi Ando	Adam's Peak	
12 Feb, 2012	3	Tokyo	Kyodo Tsushin Hai	GIII	Turf 1800 m (Firm)	11	4.1 (2nd)	1st	1:48.3	1 3/4 lengths	Hiroyuki Uchida	(Deep Brillante)	
15 Apr, 2012	3	Nakayama	Satsuki Sho	GI	Turf 2000 m (Good)	18	7.1 (4th)	1st	2:01.3	2 1/2 lengths	Hiroyuki Uchida	(World Ace)	
27 May, 2012	3	Tokyo	Tokyo Yushun	GI	Turf 2400 m (Firm)	18	3.1 (2nd)	5th	2:24.0	(1 1/2 lengths)	Hiroyuki Uchida	Deep Brillante	
23 Sep, 2012	3	Hanshin	Kobe Shimbun Hai	GII	Turf 2400 m (Firm)	15	2.3 (1st)	1st	2:25.2	2 1/2 lengths	Hiroyuki Uchida	(Lord Acclaim)	
21 Oct, 2012	3	Kyoto	Kikuka Sho	GI	Turf 3000 m (Firm)	18	1.4 (1st)	1st	3:02.9	1 3/4 lengths	Hiroyuki Uchida	(Sky Dignity)	
23 Dec, 2012	3	Nakayama	Arima Kinen	GI	Turf 2500 m (Firm)	16	2.7 (1st)	1st	2:31.9	1 1/2 lengths	Hiroyuki Uchida	(Ocean Blue)	
17 Mar, 2013	4	Hanshin	Hanshin Daishoten	GII	Turf 3000 m (Firm)	9	1.1 (1st)	1st	3:05.0	2 lengths	Hiroyuki Uchida	(Desperado)	
28 Apr, 2013	4	Kyoto	Tenno Sho (Spring)	GI	Turf 3200 m (Firm)	18	1.3 (1st)	5th	3:15.1	(5 1/4 lengths)	Hiroyuki Uchida	Fenomeno	
23 Jun, 2013	4	Hanshin	Takarazuka Kinen	GI	Turf 2200 m (Firm)	11	2.9 (2nd)	1st	2:13.2	3 1/2 lengths	Hiroyuki Uchida	(Danon Ballade)	
6 Oct, 2013	4	Kyoto	Kyoto Daishoten	GII	Turf 2400 m (Firm)	13	1.2 (1st)	5th	2:23.2	(2 1/2 lengths)	Hiroyuki Uchida	Hit The Target	
24 Nov, 2013	4	Tokyo	Japan Cup	GI	Turf 2400 m (Firm)	17	3.4 (2nd)	15th	2:27.5	(8 1/4 lengths)	Hiroyuki Uchida	Gentildonna	
22 Dec, 2013	4	Nakayama	Arima Kinen	GI	Turf 2500 m (Firm)	16	4.4 (2nd)	3rd	2:33.8	(9 1/2 lengths)	Ryan Moore	Orfevre	
23 Mar, 2014	5	Hanshin	Hanshin Daishoten	GII	Turf 3000 m (Firm)	9	1.7 (1st)	1st	3:06.6	3 1/2 lengths	Yasunari Iwata	(Admire Rakti)	
4 May, 2014	5	Kyoto	Tenno Sho (Spring)	GI	Turf 3200 m (Firm)	18	4.3 (2nd)	7th	3:15.6	(3 1/4 lengths)	Craig Williams	Fenomeno	
29 Jun, 2014	5	Hanshin	Takarazuka Kinen	GI	Turf 2200 m (Firm)	12	2.7 (1st)	1st	2:13.9	3 lengths	Norihiro Yokoyama	(Curren Mirotic)	
24 Aug, 2014	5	Sapporo	Sapporo Kinen	GII	Turf 2000 m (Firm)	14	1.8 (1st)	2nd	1:59.2	(3/4 lengths)	Norihiro Yokoyama	Harp Star	
5 Oct, 2014	5	Longchamp	Prix de l'Arc de Triomphe	GI	Turf 2400 m (Firm)	20	13.0 (7th)	14th	--	(7 3/4 lengths)	Norihiro Yokoyama	Treve	
28 Dec, 2014	5	Nakayama	Arima Kinen	GI	Turf 2500 m (Firm)	16	3.5 (1st)	3rd	2:35.4	(3/4 lengths)	Yasunari Iwata	Gentildonna	
25 Jan, 2015	6	Nakayama	American Jockey Club Cup	GII	Turf 2200 m (Firm)	17	1.3 (1st)	7th	2:14.1	(3 1/4 lengths)	Yasunari Iwata	Courir Kaiser	
22 Mar, 2015	6	Hanshin	Hanshin Daishoten	GII	Turf 3000 m (Firm)	10	1.6 (1st)	1st	3:05.9	1 1/4 lengths	Yasunari Iwata	(Denim And Ruby)	
3 May, 2015	6	Kyoto	Tenno Sho (Spring)	GI	Turf 3200 m (Firm)	17	4.6 (2nd)	1st	3:14.7	neck	Norihiro Yokoyama	(Fame Game)	
28 Jun, 2015	6	Hanshin	Takarazuka Kinen	GI	Turf 2200 m (Firm)	16	1.9 (1st)	15th	2:15.6	(7 3/4 lengths)	Norihiro Yokoyama	Lovely Day	
29 Nov, 2015	6	Tokyo	Japan Cup	GI	Turf 2400 m (Firm)	18	4.7 (2nd)	10th	2:25.1	(3 lengths)	Norihiro Yokoyama	Shonan Pandora	
27 Dec, 2015	6	Nakayama	Arima Kinen	GI	Turf 2500 m (Firm)	16	4.1 (1st)	8th	2:33.3	(2 1/2 lengths)	Hiroyuki Uchida	Gold Actor	

- R in the chart and the time written in red indicates the horse finished in record time.

== Pedigree ==
Pedigree of Gold Ship (JPN), grey colt, 2009
Sire Stay Gold (JPN) 1994	Sunday Silence (USA); 1986	Halo (USA)	Hail To Reason (USA)
Sire Stay Gold (JPN) 1994	Sunday Silence (USA); 1986	Halo (USA)	Cosmah (USA)
Sire Stay Gold (JPN) 1994	Sunday Silence (USA); 1986	Wishing Well (USA)	Understanding (USA)
Sire Stay Gold (JPN) 1994	Sunday Silence (USA); 1986	Wishing Well (USA)	Mountain Flower (USA)
Sire Stay Gold (JPN) 1994	Golden Sash (JPN); 1988	Dictus (FR)	Sanctus (FR)
Sire Stay Gold (JPN) 1994	Golden Sash (JPN); 1988	Dictus (FR)	Doronic (FR)
Sire Stay Gold (JPN) 1994	Golden Sash (JPN); 1988	Dyna Sash (JPN)	Northern Taste (CAN)
Sire Stay Gold (JPN) 1994	Golden Sash (JPN); 1988	Dyna Sash (JPN)	Royal Sash (GB)
Dam Point Flag (JPN) 1998	Mejiro McQueen (JPN); 1987	Mejiro Titan (JPN)	Mejiro Asama (JPN)
Dam Point Flag (JPN) 1998	Mejiro McQueen (JPN); 1987	Mejiro Titan (JPN)	Cheryl (FR)
Dam Point Flag (JPN) 1998	Mejiro McQueen (JPN); 1987	Mejiro Aurora (JPN)	Remand (GB)
Dam Point Flag (JPN) 1998	Mejiro McQueen (JPN); 1987	Mejiro Aurora (JPN)	Mejiro Iris (JPN)
Dam Point Flag (JPN) 1998	Pastoralism (JPN); 1987	Pluralisme (USA)	The Minstrel (CAN)
Dam Point Flag (JPN) 1998	Pastoralism (JPN); 1987	Pluralisme (USA)	Cambretta (USA)
Dam Point Flag (JPN) 1998	Pastoralism (JPN); 1987	Tokuno Eighty (JPN)	Tribal Chief (GB)
Dam Point Flag (JPN) 1998	Pastoralism (JPN); 1987	Tokuno Eighty (JPN)	Iron Ruby (JPN)(Family:16-h)
