= Elm Stakes =

Elm Stakes エルムステークス
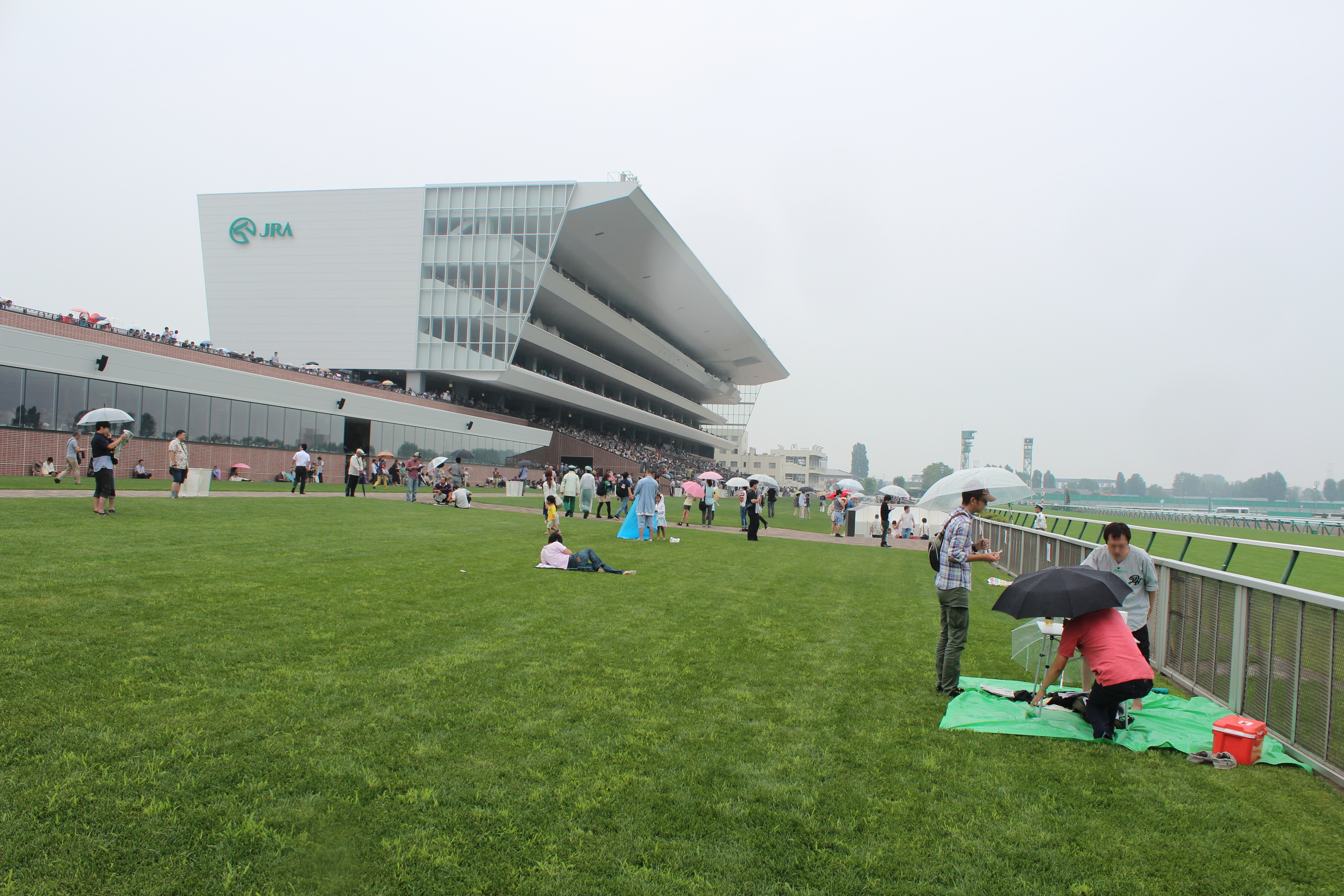
- Sapporo Racecourse
- Class: Grade 3
- Location: Sapporo Racecourse
- Inaugurated: 1990
- Race type: Thoroughbred Flat racing

Race information
- Distance: 1700 metres
- Surface: Dirt
- Track: Right-handed
- Qualification: 3-y-o+
- Weight: Special Weight
- Purse: ¥ 82,380,000 (as of 2025): 1st: ¥ 38,000,000; 2nd: ¥ 15,000,000; 3rd: ¥ 10,000,000

The Elm Stakes (Japanese エルムステークス) is a Japanese Grade 3 horse race for Thoroughbreds aged three and over, run in August over a distance of 1700 metres on dirt at Sapporo Racecourse.

It was first run in 1990 and has held Grade 3 status since 1996. The first seven editions of the race took place at Hakodate Racecourse and it was also run at that track in 2013. The 2009 contest took place over 1800 metres at Niigata Racecourse

== Weight ==
54 kg for three-year-old, 57 kg for four-year-old and above.

Allowances:

- 2 kg for fillies / mares
- 2 kg for southern hemisphere bred three-year-old

Penalties (excluding two-year-old race performance):

- If a graded stakes race has been won within a year:
  - 3 kg for a grade 1 win (2 kg for fillies / mares)
  - 2 kg for a grade 2 win (1 kg for fillies / mares)
  - 1 kg for a grade 3 win (1 kg for fillies / mares)
- If a graded stakes race has been won for more than a year:
  - 2 kg for a grade 1 win (1 kg for fillies / mares)
  - 1 kg for a grade 2 win

== Winners since 2000 ==
Year	Winner	Age	Jockey	Trainer	Time
2000	Shinko Splendor	6	Norihiro Yokoyama	Fumio Koga	1:42.8
2001	Engel Grosse	4	Yukio Okabe	Tsutomo Niizeki	1:43.4
2002	Preeminence	5	Yoshitomi Shibata	Keizo Ito	1:43.6
2003	Admire Don	4	Katsumi Ando	Hiroyoshi Matsuda	1:43.8
2004	Personal Rush	3	Shinji Fujita	Kenji Yamauchi	1:43.2
2005	Personal Rush	4	Shinji Fujita	Kenji Yamauchi	1:44.9
2006	Hishi Atlas	6	Norihiro Yokoyama	Takayoshi Nakano	1:43.0
2007	Meishi Tokon	5	Kenichi Ikezoe	Isao Yasuda	1:43.3
2008	Ferrari Pisa	4	Yasunari Iwata	Toshiaki Shirai	1:42.9
2009	Machikanenihombare	4	Hiroshi Kitamura	Kazuo Fujisawa	1:51.1
2010	Courir Passion	5	Akihide Tsumura	Ikuo Aizawa	1:43.5
2011	Renforcer	5	Norihiro Yokoyama	Kiyoshi Hagiwara	1:44.2
2012	Roman Legend	4	Yasunari Iwata	Hideaki Fujiwara	1:42.2
2013	Fleet Street	4	Hiroyuki Uchida	Katsuhiko Sumii	1:42.0
2014	Roman Legend	6	Yasunari Iwata	Hideaki Fujiwara	1:41.9
2015	Jebel Musa	5	Yasunari Iwata	Masahiro Otake	1:43.0
2016	Riccardo	5	Hiroto Mayuzumi	Yuichi Kuroiwa	1:43.5
2017	London Town	4	Yasunari Iwata	Kazuya Makita	1:40.9
2018	Highland Peak	4	Kazuo Yokoyama	Minoru Tsuchida	1:42.0
2019	Mozu Attraction	5	Kota Fujioka	Takeshi Matsushita	1:41.9
2020	Time Flyer	5	Christophe Lemaire	Kunihide Matsuda	1:43.4
2021	Suave Aramis	6	Daisaku Matsuda	Naosuke Sugai	1:44.5
2022	Full Depth Leader	5	Yuji Tannai	Makoto Saito	1:44.2
2023	Sekifu	4	Yutaka Take	Koshiro Take	1:42.8
2024	Peisha Es	5	Kazuo Yokoyama	Kazuo Konishi	1:44.0
2025	Perriere	5	Daisuke Sasaki	Yoichi Kuroiwa	1:43.5
2026	Luxor Cafe	4	Takeshi Yokoyama	Noriyuki Hori	1:43.8

== Earlier winners ==
- 1990 -Merci Atla
- 1991 - Kamino Cresse
- 1992 - Kyoei Swat
- 1993 - Daikatsu Joanne
- 1994 - Makino Tosho
- 1995 - Ibuki Crush
- 1996 - Kyoto City
- 1997 - Battle Line
- 1998 - Taiki Sherlock
- 1999 - Nihon Pillow Jupiter

== See also ==
- Horse racing in Japan
- List of Japanese flat horse races
