= Flower Cup =

Flower Cup フラワーカップ
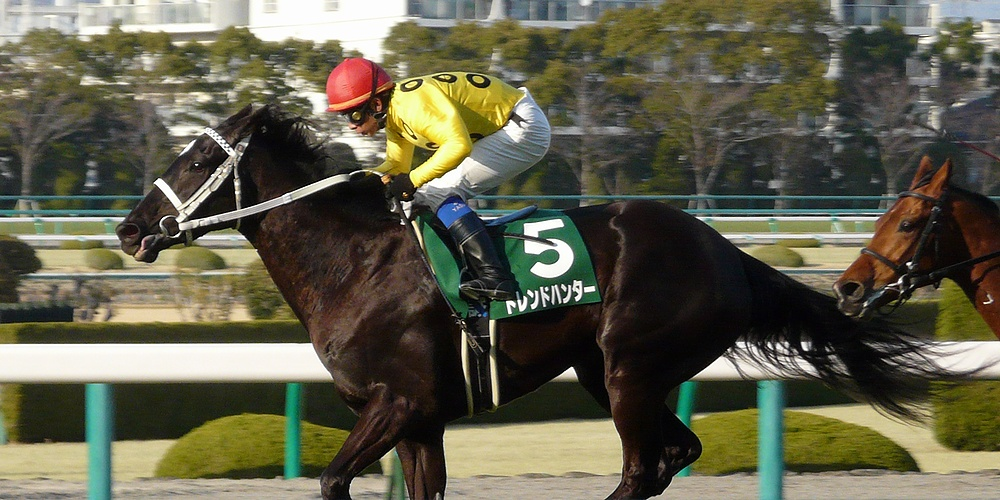
- Trend Hunter wins the Flower Cup in 2011
- Class: Grade 3
- Location: Nakayama Racecourse
- Inaugurated: 1987
- Race type: Thoroughbred Flat racing

Race information
- Distance: 1800 metres
- Surface: Turf
- Track: Right-handed
- Qualification: 3-y-o fillies
- Weight: 55 kg
- Purse: ¥ 82,380,000 (as of 2026): 1st: ¥ 38,000,000; 2nd: ¥ 15,000,000; 3rd: ¥ 10,000,000

The Flower Cup (Japanese フラワーカップ) is a Grade 3 horse race for three-year-old Thoroughbred fillies organized by Japan Racing Association (JRA). It is run in March over a distance of 1800 metres at Nakayama Racecourse.

The race was first run in 1987 and has been run at Grade 3 level ever since.

== Winners since 2000 ==
Year	Winner	Jockey	Trainer	Owner	Time
2000	Maltese Superb	Yoshitomi Shibata	Masahiro Horii	Yoshio Fujita	1:50.8
2001	Time Fair Lady	Masayoshi Ebina	Eiji Nakano	Takao Tokizaki	1:50.3
2002	Smile Tomorrow	Yukio Okabe	Kazuhiro Seishi	Masatsune Iida	1:49.1
2003	Meine Nouvelle	Norihiro Yokoyama	Ryuichi Inaba	Thoroughbred Club Ruffian	1:49.5
2004	Dance in the Mood	Yutaka Take	Kazuo Fujisawa	Shadai Race Horse	1:50.9
2005	Cesario	Yuichi Fukunaga	Katsuhiko Sumii	Carrot Farm	1:49.0
2006	Kiss To Heaven	Norihiro Yokoyama	Hirofumi Toda	Kazuko Yoshida	1:48.9
2007	Shonan Talent	Yoshitomi Shibata	Yoshitaka Ninomiya	Shonan	1:49.6
2008	Black Emblem	Masami Matsuoka	Shigeyuki Kojima	Kunio Tabara	1:49.5
2009	Viva Vodka	Issei Murata	Kazuhiro Seishi	Seiichi Serizawa	1:49.3
2010	Oken Sakura	Hiroki Goto	Hidetaka Otonashi	Akira Fukui	1:50.3
2011 ^{[a]}	Trend Hunter	Yasunari Iwata	Hiroyoshi Matsuda	Masatsune Iida	1:47.0
2012	Omega Heartland	Shu Ishibashi	Noriyuki Hori	Reiko Hara	1:53.3
2013	Sakura Plaisir	Norihiro Yokoyama	Tomohito Ozeki	Sakura Commerce	1:50.0
2014	Bounce Shasse	Hiroshi Kitamura	Kazuo Fujisawa	Carrot Farm	1:51.3
2015	Albiano	Yuichi Shibayama	Tetsuya Kimura	Kazumi Yoshida	1:49.4
2016	Angel Face	Yuichi Fukunaga	Hideaki Fujiwara	Lord Horse Club	1:49.3
2017	Fan Dii Na	Yasunari Iwata	Tomokazu Takano	Turf Sport	1:48.7
2018	Cantabile	Mirco Demuro	Katsuhiko Sumii	Tatsue Ishikawa	1:49.2
2019	Contra Check	Genki Maruyama	Kazuo Fujisawa	Carrot Farm	1:47.4
2020	Ablaze	Kanichiro Fujii	Yasutoshi Ikee	Koki Maeda	1:48.2
2021	Ho O Ixelles	Kyosuke Maruta	Mizuki Takayanagi	Yoshihisa Ozaki	1:49.2
2022	Stunning Rose	Yuga Kawada	Tomokazu Takano	Sunday Racing	1:48.5
2023	Emu	Mirco Demuro	Shoichiro Wada	North Hills	1:53.2
2024	Mi Anhelo	Akihide Tsumura	Toru Hayashi	Silk Racing	1:48.0
2025	Lesedrama	Keita Tosaki	Yasuyuki Tsujino	Shadai Race Horse	1:47.8
2026	Smart Priere	Yusuke Hara	Ryuji Okubo	Toru Okawa	1:48.3

^{a} The 2011 running took place at Hanshin Racecourse.

== Earlier winners ==
- 1987 - Hase Vertex
- 1988 - Free Talk
- 1989 - Real Sapphire
- 1990 - Yukino Surprise
- 1991 - Flash Shower
- 1992 - Brand Art
- 1993 - Hokuto Vega
- 1994 - Onward Noble
- 1995 - Ibuki New Star
- 1996 - Hishi Batalie
- 1997 - Seeking the Pearl
- 1998 - Sugino Cutie
- 1999 - Sayaki

== See also ==
- Horse racing in Japan
- List of Japanese flat horse races
