= Niigata Kinen =

Niigata Kinen 新潟記念
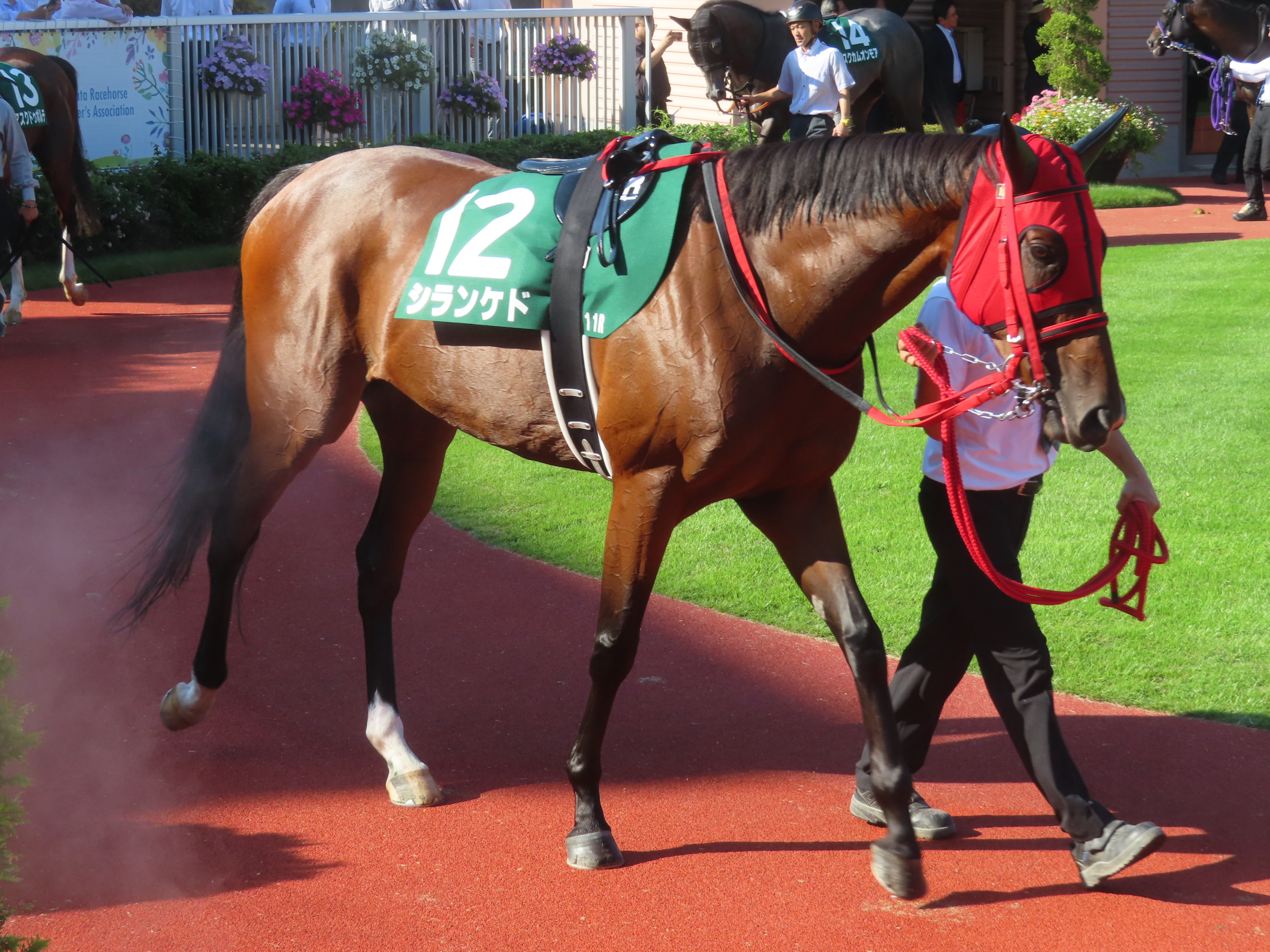
- 2025 Niigata Kinen winner Shirankedo at the parade ring before the race
- Class: Grade 3
- Location: Niigata Racecourse
- Inaugurated: 1965
- Race type: Thoroughbred Flat racing

Race information
- Distance: 2000 metres
- Surface: Turf
- Track: Left-handed
- Qualification: 3-y-o+
- Weight: Special Weight
- Purse: ¥ 92,980,000 (as of 2025): 1st: ¥ 43,000,000; 2nd: ¥ 17,000,000; 3rd: ¥ 11,000,000

The Niigata Kinen (Japanese 新潟記念) is a Japanese Grade 3 horse race for Thoroughbreds aged three and over, run in late August or early September over a distance of 2000 metres on turf at Niigata Racecourse.

The Niigata Kinen was first run in 1965 and has held Grade 3 status since 1984. It was run at Nakayama Racecourse in 1996 and 2000.

== Weight ==
54 kg for three-year-olds, 57 kg for four-year-olds and above

Allowances:

- 2 kg for fillies / mares
- 2 kg for southern hemisphere-bred three-year-olds

Penalties (excluding two-year-old race performance):

- If a graded stakes race has been won within a year:
  - 3 kg for a grade 1 win (2 kg for fillies / mares)
  - 2 kg for a grade 2 win (1 kg for fillies / mares)
  - 1 kg for a grade 3 win (no penalty for fillies / mares)
- If a graded stakes race has been won for more than a year:
  - 2 kg for a grade 1 win (1 kg for fillies / mares)
  - 1 kg for a grade 2 win (no penalty for fillies / mares)

== Winners since 2000 ==
Year	Winner	Age	Jockey	Trainer	Owner	Time
2000	Daiwa Texas	7	Hiroshi Kitamura	Sueo Masuzawa	Daiwa Shoji	2:00.2
2001	Sun Place	6	Shigefumi Kumazawa	Yasuo Ikee	Shadai Race Horse	1:57.0
2002	Towa Treasure	5	Katsuharu Tanaka	Mitsuru Hashida	Suzu Saito	1:58.0
2003	Derby Regno	5	Hideaki Miyuki	Shigetada Takahashi	Derby Corporation	1:58.7
2004	Super Gene	6	Eiji Nakadate	Masanori Sakaguchi	Shigeko Hasatani	1:57.7
2005	Yamanin Alabaster	4	Teruo Eda	Shinobu Hoshino	Hajime Doi	2:00.1
2006	Top Gun Joe	4	Hiroki Goto	Masamichi Wada	Takao Kawauchi	1:57.2
2007	Yumeno Shirushi	5	Yutaka Yoshida	Yokichi Okubo	Teruya Yoshida	1:57.8
2008	Arco Senora	4	Tomoharu Bushizawa	Shigenori Hatakeyama	Masakatsu Nakamura	1:57.5
2009	Hokko Pas de Chat	7	Teruo Eda	Akira Murayama	Koichi Yabe	1:59.6
2010	Narita Crystal	4	Hideaki Miyuki	Kazuyoshi Kihara	Osumi	1:58.4
2011	Narita Crystal	5	Yutaka Take	Kazuyoshi Kihara	Osumi	1:59.1
2012	Transwarp	7	Takuya Ono	Kiyoshi Hagiwara	Carrot Farm	1:57.6
2013	Cosmo Nemo Shin	6	Masami Matsuoka	Hidekatsu Shimizu	Big Red Farm	1:58.9
2014	Martinborough	5	Nash Rawiller	Yasuo Tomomichi	Kazumi Yoshida	1:58.3
2015	Passion Dance	7	Mirco Demuro	Yasuo Tomomichi	Kaneko Makoto Holdings	1:58.2
2016	A Day In The Life	5	Norihiro Yokoyama	Kiyoshi Hagiwara	Seiichi Iketani	1:57.5
2017	Tatsu Gogeki	5	Shinichiro Akiyama	Ippo Sameshima	Takayuki Suzuki	1:57.9
2018	Blast Onepiece	3	Kenichi Ikezoe	Masahiro Otake	Silk Racing	1:57.5
2019	You Can Smile	4	Yasunari Iwata	Yasuo Tomomichi	Kaneko Makoto Holdings	1:57.5
2020	Bravas	4	Yuichi Fukunaga	Yasuo Tomomichi	Kazuhiro Sasaki	1:59.9
2021	Meiner Fanrong	6	Mirco Demuro	Takahisa Tezuka	Thoroughbred Club Ruffian	1:58.4
2022	Karate	6	Akira Sugawara	Yasuyuki Tsujino	Hikaru Odagiri	1:58.9
2023	Nocking Point	3	Hiroshi Kitamura	Tetsuya Kimura	Sunday Racing	1:59.0
2024	Shinryokuka	4	Hatsuya Kowata	Masahiro Takeuchi	Kentaro Yui	1:58.0
2025	Shirankedo	5	Ryusei Sakai	Mitsunori Makiura	Toshihiko Tabata	1:58.0
2026	Zoroastro	3	Mirai Iwata	Keisuke Miyata	Sunday Racing	1:59.6

== Earlier winners ==
- 1965 - Umeno Chikara
- 1966 - Schutzlos Berger
- 1967 - Marufubuki
- 1968 - Haku Sensho
- 1969 - Amanogawa
- 1970 - Suijin
- 1971 - Tokino Shin O
- 1972 - Passing Goal
- 1973 - Yama Tesco
- 1974 - Nasuno Chigusa
- 1975 - Hase Masaru
- 1976 - Takeden Jaguar
- 1977 - Mitomo O
- 1978 - Lucky West
- 1979 - Hookano
- 1980 - Nakami Sapphire
- 1981 - Hase Shinobu
- 1982 - Meiji Tiger
- 1983 - Upsetter
- 1984 - Dyna Mine
- 1985 - Russian Blue
- 1986 - Blacksky
- 1987 - Dyna Fairy
- 1988 - Dyna Orange
- 1989 - Hardy God
- 1990 - Safari Olive
- 1991 - Sengoku Hisei
- 1992 - Tanino Bolero
- 1993 - Brown Beetle
- 1994 - Inter Spur
- 1995 - Irish Dance
- 1996 - Tokai Taro
- 1997 - Pal Bright
- 1998 - Offside Trap
- 1999 - Brilliant Road

== See also ==
- Horse racing in Japan
- List of Japanese flat horse races
