= Sapporo Racecourse =

Racecourse in Sapporo, Hokkaido, Japan

Coordinates: 43°04′40″N 141°19′32″E

Sapporo Racecourse 札幌競馬場
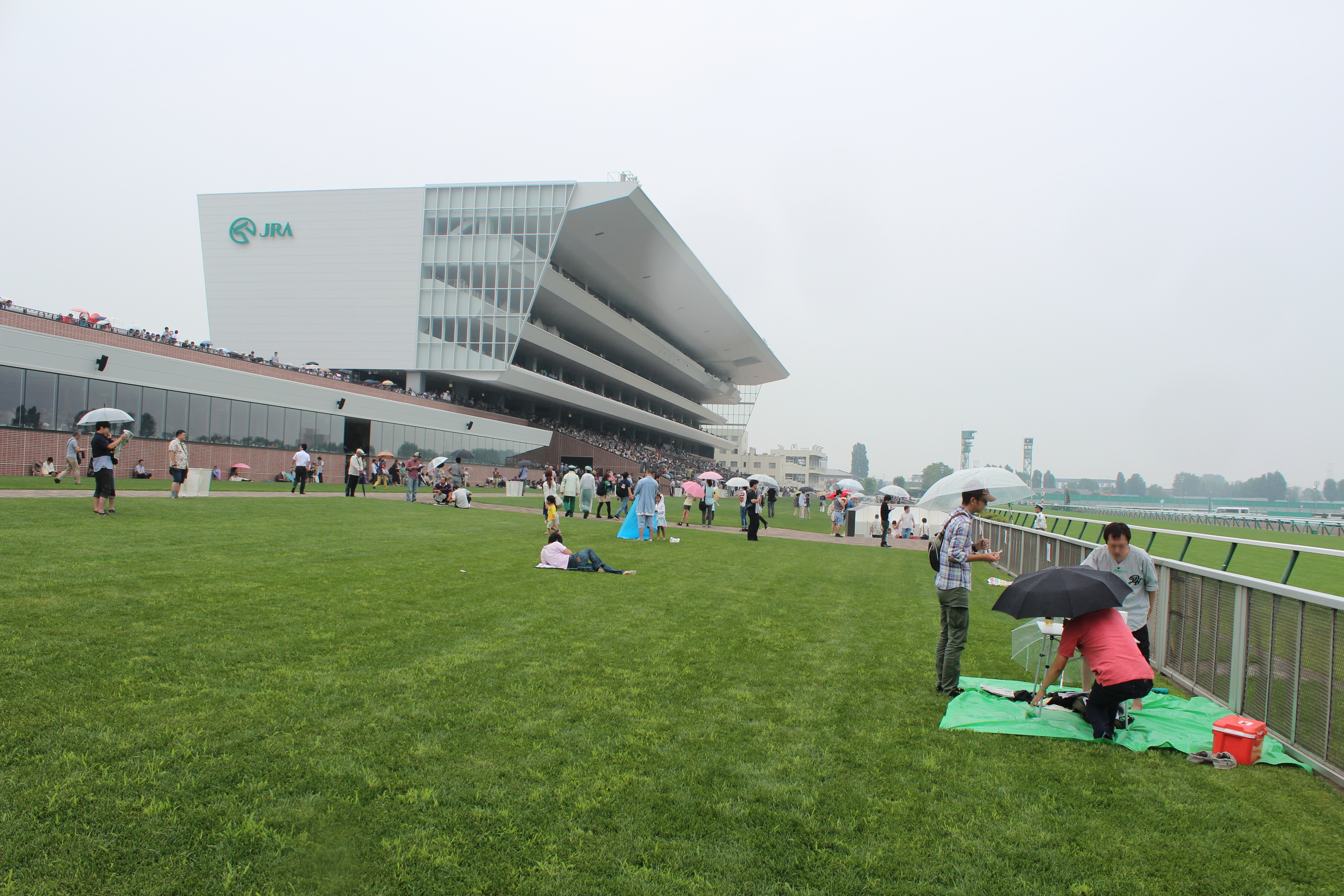
- Sapporo Racecourse Main Gate
- Interactive map of Sapporo Racecourse 札幌競馬場
- Location: Chuō-ku, Sapporo, Hokkaidō, Japan
- Owned by: Japan Racing Association
- Date opened: 1907
- Race type: Thoroughbred - flat racing
- Course type: Turf, dirt
- Notable races: Sapporo Kinen (GII)

Sapporo Racecourse (札幌競馬場, Sapporo-keibajō) is a racecourse run by the Japan Racing Association located in Chūō-ku, Sapporo, Hokkaido, Japan. Built in 1907, it has a seating capacity of 12,000, and can accommodate 30,000 spectators in total.

Sapporo Racecourse hosts one GII (Grade 2) horse race, the Sapporo Kinen.

== Physical attributes ==
=== Main turf course ===
1000m, 1200m, 1500m, 1800m, 2000m, and 2600m races are run on the Main turf course.

Length	Straight	Width
A-course 1640.9 m	A-course 266.1 m	A-course 25–27 m
B-course 1650.3 m	B-course 267.6 m	B-course 23.5-25.5 m
C-course 1659.8 m	C-course 269.1 m	C-course 22–24 m

=== Dirt course ===
1000 m, 1200 m, 1500 m, 1800 m, 2000 m, and 2600 m races are run on the dirt oval.

Length	Straight	Width
1487.0 m	264.3 m	20 m

== Emergency use ==
It has been designated as a "wide-area evacuation site" by the city of Sapporo and can also be used as an evacuation shelter in the event of a large-scale fire .

== Notable races ==
Month	Race	Distance	Age/sex
Grade II
Aug	Sapporo Kinen	Turf 2000m	3yo +
Grade III
Jul	Queen Stakes	Turf 1800m	3yo + f
Aug	Keeneland Cup (Sprinters Stakes Trial)	Turf 1200m	3yo +
Aug	Elm Stakes	Dirt 1700m	3yo +
Sep	Sapporo Nisai Stakes	Turf 1800m	2yo

== Access ==
- JR Hokkaido: 10 minutes walk from Sōen Station

== Track records ==
Source：レコードタイム表 (Record time table) -> 札幌競馬場 (Sapporo Racecourse)

- † Reference Time.
- Last updated on August 23, 2026.

=== Turf course (2yo) ===
Distance	Time	Racehorse	Sex	Weight	Jockey	Date Recorded
1000m	56.9	Kaikano Kiseki	Filly	54kg	Katsuma Sameshima	June 12, 2021
1200m	1:07.9	Pomeranc	Filly	54kg	Yūsuke Fujioka	June 19, 2021
1500m	1:28.6	Nitamonodoshi	Colt	55kg	Yuga Kawada	August 18, 2024
1800m	1:47.2	Crepuscular	Colt	55kg	Rachel King	August 3, 2025
2000m	2:02.1	Miyamazakura	Filly	54kg	Yūsuke Fujioka	August 31, 2019

=== Turf course (3yo+) ===
Distance	Time	Racehorse	Sex	Weight	Jockey	Date Recorded
1000m	56.5	Ogi Tiffany	Mare 5	54kg	Hiroshi Gōhara	June 23, 1996
1200m	1:07.4	Schwarz Kaiser	Gelding 5	55kg	Kenichi Ikezoe	July 23, 2023
1500m	1:27.3	Vatreni	Gelding 3	54kg	Kazuo Yokoyama	June 27, 2021
1800m	1:45.7	Quatre Feuilles	Mare 5	55kg	Yuichi Fukunaga	August 3, 2014
2000m	1:58.2	Shake Your Heart	Horse 6	58kg	Yoshihiro Furukawa	August 16, 2026
2600m	2:37.6	Pont des Arts	Mare 5	54kg	Christophe Lemaire	August 8, 2020

=== Dirt course (2yo) ===
Distance	Time	Racehorse	Sex	Weight	Jockey	Date Recorded
1000m	58.5	Grandson	Colt	53kg	Yasuhiko Yasuda	September 15, 2001
1700m	1:44.9	Sage Minoru	Colt	53kg	Ryusei Sakai	August 12, 2017

=== Dirt course (3yo+) ===
Distance	Time	Racehorse	Sex	Weight	Jockey	Date Recorded
1000m	57.5	Million Sempu	Horse 6	55kg	Masato Shibata	June 24, 1990
1700m	1:40.9	London Town	Colt 4	57kg	Yasunari Iwata	August 13, 2017
2400m	2:32.1	Endowment	Colt 3	54kg	Hayato Yoshida	August 24, 2019
