= Nikkei Sho =

Flat horse race in Japan

Nikkei Sho 日経賞
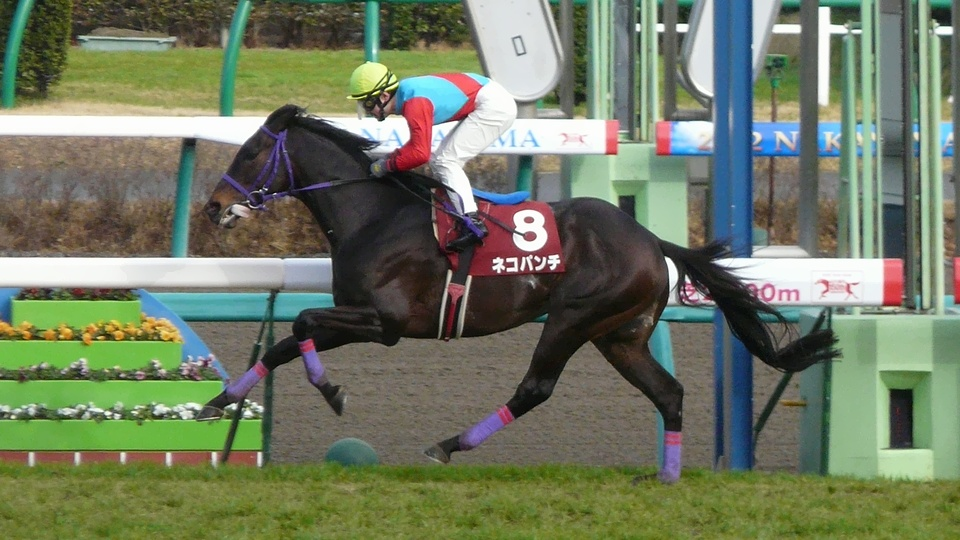
- 2012 Nikkei Sho
- Class: Grade 2
- Location: Nakayama Racecourse
- Race type: Thoroughbred Flat racing

Race information
- Distance: 2500 metres
- Surface: Turf
- Track: Right-handed
- Qualification: 4-y-o+
- Weight: Special Weight
- Purse: ¥ 145,220,000 (as of 2026): 1st: ¥ 67,000,000; 2nd: ¥ 27,000,000; 3rd: ¥ 17,000,000

The Nikkei Sho (Japanese 日経賞) is an annual Grade 2 flat horse race in Japan for Thoroughbreds of at least four years of age. It is run over a distance of 2,500 metres at Nakayama Racecourse in March.

The Nikkei Sho was first run in 1953 and was elevated to Grade 2 status in 1984. The award money is donated by Nikkei Inc, a newspaper company headquartered in Tokyo and Osaka.

Some of the race's most notable winners include Symboli Rudolf, Rice Shower, Meisho Doto, Matsurida Gogh, Fenomeno and Gold Actor.

== History ==
The race was established in 1953 as a Jūshō ("Big race", 重賞) for horses aged 5 years or older (now 4 years or older) under the name "Nihon Keizai Sho" (日本経済賞), or "Japan Economic Award". (Note: Prior to Japan switching to the international age system for racehorses in 2001, they used an old age notation called "kazoedoshi", where all horses were considered to be one year old at birth.) It was renamed in 1979.

The inaugural race was held over 3200m on turf, at Nakayama Racecourse, but the venue, distance, and time of year have undergone several changes, with the distance settling at 2500m on turf, the same course as the Arima Kinen, since 1967. The race has been held at Nakayama during the March-April season since 1984. Today, it is one of two preliminary races for the Tennō Shō (Spring); since 2014, the winner of the Nikkei Sho has been granted priority entry.

Foreign-bred horses have been allowed to participate since 1989, and horses belonging to local racetracks since 1995. In 2002, it become an international race, in which foreign-trained horses can also participate.

== Race details ==
The race is run at Nakayama Racecourse over a distance of 2,500 meters on turf, using the right-handed (clockwise) inner curve.

=== Weight Requirements ===
56 kg for four-year-olds, and 57 kg for five-year-olds and above.
Allowances:
2 kg for fillies / mares

- 1 kg for southern hemisphere-bred three-year-olds

Penalties:

- If a graded stakes race has been won within a year, 2 kg for a Grade 1 win (1 kg for fillies / mares), 1 kg for a Grade 2 win
- If a graded stakes race has been won for more than a year (excluding two-year-old race performance), 1 kg for a Grade 1 win

== Winners since 2000 ==
Year	Winner	Age	Jockey	Trainer	Owner	Time
2000	Leo Ryuho	5	Takanori Kikuzawa	Hiroaki Sugiura	Leo	2:35.4
2001	Meisho Doto	5	Yasuhiko Yasuda	Isao Yasuda	Yoshio Matsumoto	2:33.7
2002	Active Bio	5	Hiroki Goto	Hiroki Sakiyama	Bio	2:37.0
2003	Ingrandire	4	Junichi Kobayashi	Yoshinami Shimizu	Chizu Yoshida	2:31.3
2004	Win Generale	4	Masayoshi Ebina	Sakae Kunieda	WIN	2:32.8
2005	Yukina Sun Royal	8	Jiro Ono	Sueo Masuzawa	Motoyuki Ito	2:33.3
2006	Lincoln	6	Norihiro Yokoyama	Hidetaka Otonashi	Eiko Kondo	2:33.0
2007	Never Bouchon	4	Hiroshi Kitamura	Masanori Ito	T H	2:31.8
2008	Matsurida Gogh	5	Masayoshi Ebina	Sakae Kunieda	Fumie Takahashi	2:32.7
2009	Al Nasrain	5	Masayoshi Ebina	Shigeki Matsumoto	Sunday Racing	2:31.2
2010	Meiner Kitz	7	Masami Matsuoka	Sakae Kunieda	Thoroughbred Club Ruffian	2:34.1
2011	To The Glory ^{[1]}	4	Yuichi Fukunaga	Yasutoshi Ikee	Carrot Farm	2:25.4
2012	Neko Punch	6	Teruo Eda	Shinobu Hoshino	Shigeru Kiritani	2:37.4
2013	Fenomeno	4	Masayoshi Ebina	Hirofumi Toda	Sunday Racing	2:32.0
2014	Win Variation	6	Yasunari Iwata	Masahiro Matsunaga	WIN	2:34.4
2015	Admire Deus	4	Yasunari Iwata	Mitsuru Hashida	Riichi Kondo	2:30.2
2016	Gold Actor	5	Hayato Yoshida	Tadashige Nakagawa	Kaname Ishiro	2:36.8
2017	Sciacchetra	4	Hironobu Tanabe	Katsuhiko Sumii	Makoto Kaneko	2:32.8
2018	Ganko	5	Yusuke Fujioka	Shigeki Matsumoto	Mitsuo Sugisawa	2:33.9
2019	Meisho Tekkon	4	Yutaka Take	Yoshitada Takahashi	Yoshio Matsumoto	2:34.2
2020	Mikki Swallow	6	Norihiro Yokoyama	Takanori Kikuzawa	Mizuki Noda	2:32.9
2021	Win Marilyn	4	Takeshi Yokoyama	Takahisa Tezuka	WIN	2:33.3
2022	Titleholder	4	Kazuo Yokoyama	Toru Kurita	Hiroshi Yamada	2:35.4
2023	Titleholder	5	Kazuo Yokoyama	Toru Kurita	Hiroshi Yamada	2:36.8
2024	Struve	5	Katsuma Sameshima	Noriyuki Hori	Katsuko Muraki	2:31.4
2025	Meiner Emperor	5	Yuji Tannai	Hisashi Shimizu	Thoroughbred Club Ruffian	2:36.1
2026	My Universe	4	Norihiro Yokoyama	Koshiro Take	Toshio Terada	2:30.7

^{1} The 2011 race took place at Hanshin Racecourse over a distance of 2,400 metres.

== Earlier winners ==
- 1953 - Takahata
- 1954 - Fuso
- 1955 - Kuri Chikara
- 1956 - Fukriyu
- 1957 - Haku Chikara
- 1958 - Onward There
- 1959 - Hishimasaru
- 1960 - Otemon
- 1961 - Homare Boshi
- 1962 - Onslaught
- 1963 - Yamano O
- 1964 - Yamato Kiyodai
- 1965 - Fuji Isami
- 1966 - Speed King
- 1967 - Speed Symboli
- 1968 - Hishi Yakushin
- 1969 - Light World
- 1970 - Akane Tenryu
- 1971 - Makino Hope
- 1972 - Katsu Taiko
- 1973 - Toyo Asahi
- 1974 - Takekuma Hikaru
- 1975 - White Fountain
- 1976 - White Fountain
- 1977 - Green Grass
- 1978 - Kane Minobu
- 1979 - Dan Kenji
- 1980 - Hoyo Boy
- 1981 - Western Jet
- 1982 - Mejiro Titan
- 1983 - Asahi Teio
- 1984 - Hayate Mig
- 1985 - Symboli Rudolf
- 1986 - Chestnut Valley
- 1987 - Miho Shinzan
- 1988 - Mejiro Fulmar
- 1989 - Running Free
- 1990 - Osumi Shadai
- 1991 - Kiri Sancy
- 1992 - Mejiro Ryan
- 1993 - Rice Shower
- 1994 - Stage Champ
- 1995 - Inter Liner
- 1996 - Hokkai Rousseau
- 1997 - Rosen Kavalier
- 1998 - Tenjin Shogun
- 1999 - Seiun Sky

== See also ==
- Horse racing in Japan
- List of Japanese flat horse races
