= Asia Express (horse) =

American-bred Thoroughbred racehorse

Asia Express; アジアエクスプレス
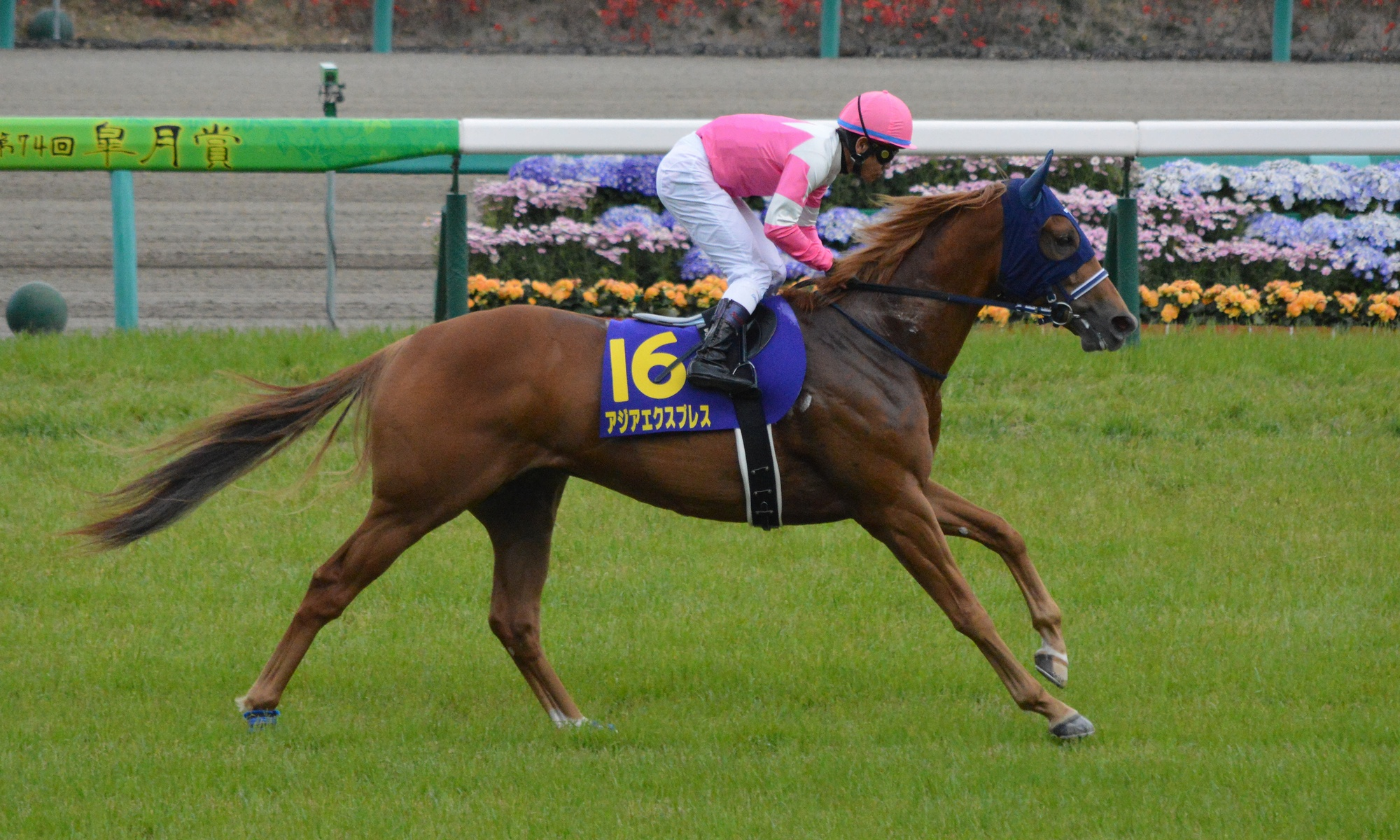
- Asia Express in April 2014
- Sire: Henny Hughes
- Grandsire: Hennessy
- Dam: Running Bobcats
- Damsire: Running Stag
- Sex: Stallion
- Foaled: 9 February 2011
- Country: United States
- Colour: Chestnut
- Breeder: Ocala Farm
- Owner: Yukio Baba
- Racing colours
- Trainer: Takahisa Tezuka
- Jockey: Ryan Moore; Keita Tosaki
- Record: 12: 4-3-0
- Earnings: JPY176,336,000

Major wins
- Asahi Hai Futurity Stakes (2013); Leopard Stakes (2014)

Awards
- JRA Award for Best Two-Year-Old Colt (2013); Top-rated Japanese 3-y-o on dirt (2014)

Asia Express (Japanese: アジアエクスプレス, foaled 9 February 2011) is an American-bred, Japan-based Thoroughbred racehorse and sire. He was bred in Florida and exported as a two-year-old to Japan where he began his career on dirt and won two races before switching to turf to win the Asahi Hai Futurity Stakes. At the end of the year he was the top-rated juvenile in Japan and took the JRA Award for Best Two-Year-Old Colt. In the following year he was beaten in the Spring Stakes and the Satsuki Sho before reverting to dirt and winning the Leopard Stakes. He raced sporadically over the next two seasons but never won again.

== Background ==
Asia Express is a chestnut horse standing 1.66 metres high with white socks on his hind legs bred in Florida by Ocala Farm. In March 2013 the colt was consigned to the Ocala Breeders' Sales Company Selected Sale of Two-Year-Olds in Training and was bought for $230,000 by Narvick International. He was exported to Japan where he entered the ownership of Yukio Baba and was sent into training with Takahisa Tezuka.

He was sired by Henny Hughes, a sprinter whose biggest wins came in the King's Bishop Stakes and Vosburgh Stakes in 2006. As a breeding stallion he is best known as the sire of Beholder. Asia Express's dam, Running Bobcats, showed good racing ability, winning nine of her thirty-one races and $377,494 in prize money. She was descended from River Crossing who was a half-sister to Fall Aspen, the female-line ancestor of Dubai Millennium, Timber Country, Mehthaaf and Elnadim.

Asia Express is a very large horse by Thoroughbred standards, weighing between 524 kg and 554 kg during his racing career.

== Racing career ==
=== 2013: two-year-old season ===
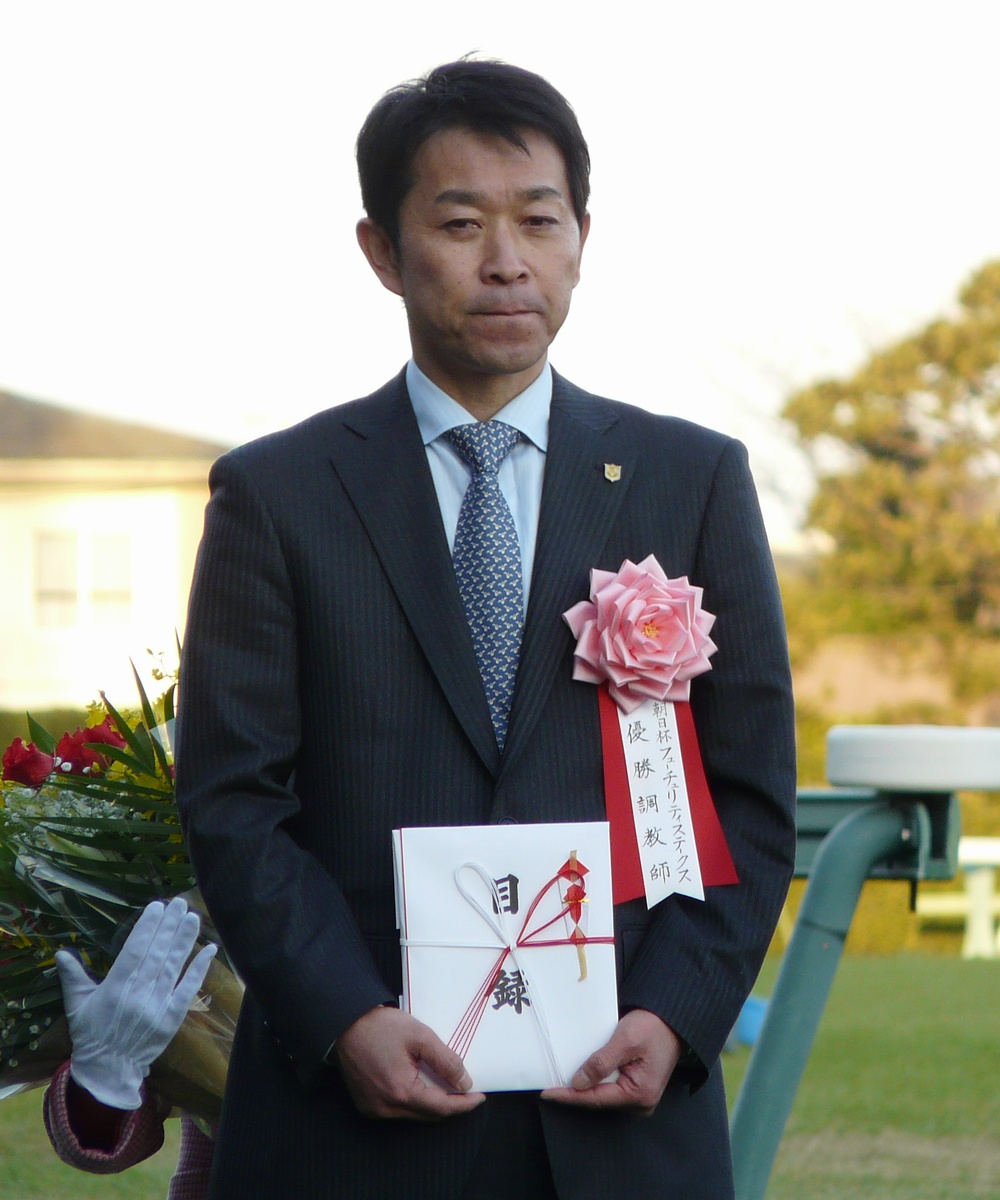
Asia Express's trainer Takahisa Tezuka

Asia Express began his races with two starts on the dirt track at Tokyo. On his racecourse debut he contested an event for previously unraced juveniles over 1200 metres on 3 November and won by more than four lengths from Autumn Love. Three weeks later he recorded another wide-margin victory as he came home seven lengths clear of Pean and fourteen others in the Oxalis Sho over 1400 metres. For his final run of the season, Asia Express was switched to the turf and moved up sharply in class for the Grade 1 Asahi Hai Futurity Stakes over 1600 metres at Nakayama Racecourse on 15 December. Ridden by the visiting English jockey Ryan Moore he was made the 7.7/1 fourth choice in a sixteen-runner field behind Atom, Pray And Real and Bel Canto (Fantasy Stakes). Asia Express raced in mid-division made a forward move on the final turn and was then switched to the outside to produce a strong run in the straight. He gained the advantage from the fading front-runner Bel Canto 100 metres from the finish and drew away to win by one and a quarter lengths and a neck from Shonan Archive and Win Full Bloom. Moore commented "He surprised me, he quickened up so well. He's a special horse, because not many do both dirt and grass. His future should be bright. He feels like he hasn't got to the bottom of it yet, like there's more to come."

In the JRA Awards for 2013 Asia Express topped the poll for the JRA Award for Best Two-Year-Old Colt taking 279 of the 280 votes. In the official Japanese rankings for 2013, he was the top-rated juvenile, ahead of the filly Red Reveur.

=== 2014: three-year-old season ===
On his first run as a three-year-old Asia Express contested the Spring Stakes (a major trial race for the Satsuki Sho) over 1800 metres at Nakayama on 23 March he was made the 1.3/1 favourite but sustained his first defeat as he was beaten into second place by Rosa Gigantea. In the Satsuki Sho over 2000 metres at Nakayama the colt started the 6.5/1 fifth choice in the betting but after disputing the lead 200 metres from the finish he faded to finish sixth behind Isla Bonita, beaten two and a half lengths by the winner. After a two-month break Asia Express returned to the Tokyo dirt track but ran very poorly as he finished unplaced behind Red Alvis when odds-on favourite for the Grade 3 Unicorn Stakes. On 10 August the colt faced Red Alvis again in the Grade 3 Leopard Stakes on the dirt at Niigata Racecourse and started the 2.3/1 favourite in a fifteen-runner field. Ridden by Keita Tosaki he won decisively, coming home three and a half lengths clear of Cry Smile, with Red Alvis in fourth.

Asia Express was rated the best Japanese three-year-old on dirt for the 2014 season.

=== 2015 & 2016: later career ===
Asia Express raced on dirt throughout his later career. On 26 March 2015 the colt began his third campaign in the Listed Nagoya Daishoten in which he started odds-on favourite but was beaten half a length by the six-year-old Meisho Columbo. A month later he was the beaten favourite again as he finished second to Kurino Star O in the Grade 3 Antares Stakes over 1800 metres at Hanshin Racecourse. In his two other races that year he finished fifth to Incantation in the Grade 3 Heian Stakes at Kyoto Racecourse in May and fourth to Danon Liberty in the Listed BSN Sho at Niigata in August.

After more than a year off the track, Asia Express returned for a final run at Fukushima Racecourse in November 2016 when he finished unplaced in the Listed Fukushima Minyu Cup.

== Racing form ==
Asia Express won four races and finished second thrice out of 12 starts. This data is available based on JBIS and netkeiba.

Date	Track	Race	Grade	Distance (Condition)	Entry	HN	Odds (Favored)	Finish	Time	Margins	Jockey	Winner (Runner-up)
2013 – two-year-old season
Nov 3	Tokyo	2yo Newcomer		1,400 m (Fast)	16	13	1.6 (1)	1st	1:26.5	–0.9	Umberto Rispoli	(Autumn Love)
Nov 23	Tokyo	Oxalis Sho	ALW (1W)	1,600 m (Fast)	16	2	2.3 (1)	1st	1:37.9	–1.1	Ryan Moore	(Pean)
Dec 15	Hanshin	Asahi Hai Futurity Stakes	1	1,600 m (Firm)	16	6	8.7 (4)	1st	1:34.7	–0.2	Ryan Moore	(Shonan Archive)
2014 – three-year-old season
Mar 23	Nakayama	Spring Stakes	2	1,800 m (Firm)	15	4	2.3 (1)	2nd	1:48.6	0.2	Keita Tosaki	Rosa Gigantea
Apr 20	Nakayama	Satsuki Sho	1	2,000 m (Firm)	18	16	7.5 (5)	6th	2:00.0	0.4	Keita Tosaki	Isla Bonita
Jun 22	Tokyo	Unicorn Stakes	3	1,600 m (Good)	16	2	1.3 (1)	12th	1:37.7	1.7	Keita Tosaki	Red Alvis
Aug 10	Niigata	Leopard Stakes	3	1,800 m (Good)	15	13	3.3 (1)	1st	1:50.4	–0.6	Keita Tosaki	(Cry Smile)
2015 – four-year-old season
Mar 26	Nagoya	Nagoya Daishoten	JPN3	1,900 m (Fast)	11	10	1.5 (1)	2nd	2:00.9	0.1	Keita Tosaki	Meisho Columbo
Apr 18	Hanshin	Antares Stakes	3	1,800 m (Fast)	16	3	3.0 (1)	2nd	1:49.7	0.1	Keita Tosaki	Kurino Star O
May 23	Kyoto	Heian Stakes	3	1,900 m (Fast)	16	13	3.9 (1)	5th	1:55.6	0.5	Keita Tosaki	Incantation
Aug 29	Niigata	BSN Sho	OP	1,800 m (Muddy)	14	2	2.5 (1)	4th	1:49.8	0.3	Hiroshi Kitamura	Danon Liberty
2016 – five-year-old season
Nov 20	Fukushima	Fukushima Minyu Cup	OP	1,700 m (Good)	15	4	6.1 (3)	15th	1:46.6	2.0	Akihide Tsumura	Torakichi Shacho

Legend:
Turf Dirt

== Stud record ==
After the end of his racing career, Asia Express became a breeding stallion at the Yushun Stallion Station in Hokkaido. His first ever offspring to win a G1 race was Puro Magic who won the 2026 Sprinters Stakes.

=== Notable progenies ===
- c = colt, f = filly
- bold: Jpn1/G1 stakes

Grade winners
Foaled	Name	Sex	Major Wins
2021	Puro Magic	f	Aoi Stakes, Kitakyushu Kinen, Ibis Summer Dash (twice), Hakodate Sprint Stakes, **Sprinters Stakes**
2022	Don in the Mood	c	Leopard Stakes

== Pedigree ==
Pedigree of Asia Express, chestnut stallion, 2011
Sire Henny Hughes (USA) 2003	Hennessy; 1993	Storm Cat	Storm Bird (CAN)
Sire Henny Hughes (USA) 2003	Hennessy; 1993	Storm Cat	Terlingua
Sire Henny Hughes (USA) 2003	Hennessy; 1993	Island Kitty	Hawaii (SAF)
Sire Henny Hughes (USA) 2003	Hennessy; 1993	Island Kitty	T C Kitten
Sire Henny Hughes (USA) 2003	Meadow Flyer; 1989	Meadow Lake	Hold Your Peace
Sire Henny Hughes (USA) 2003	Meadow Flyer; 1989	Meadow Lake	Suspicious Native
Sire Henny Hughes (USA) 2003	Meadow Flyer; 1989	Shortley	Hagley
Sire Henny Hughes (USA) 2003	Meadow Flyer; 1989	Shortley	Short Winded
Dam Running Bobcats (USA) 2002	Running Stag; 1994	Cozzene	Caro (IRE)
Dam Running Bobcats (USA) 2002	Running Stag; 1994	Cozzene	Ride the Trails
Dam Running Bobcats (USA) 2002	Running Stag; 1994	Fruhlingstag (FR)	Orsini (GER)
Dam Running Bobcats (USA) 2002	Running Stag; 1994	Fruhlingstag (FR)	Revada (FR)
Dam Running Bobcats (USA) 2002	Backatem; 1997	Notebook	Well Decorated
Dam Running Bobcats (USA) 2002	Backatem; 1997	Notebook	Mobcap
Dam Running Bobcats (USA) 2002	Backatem; 1997	Deputys Mistress	Deputy Minister (CAN)
Dam Running Bobcats (USA) 2002	Backatem; 1997	Deputys Mistress	River Crossing (Family:4-m)
