= Puro Magic =

Japanese Thoroughbred racehorse (foaled 2021)

Puro Magic; ピューロマジック
- Puro Magic at the 2026 Takamatsunomiya Kinen paddock
- Breed: Thoroughbred
- Sire: Asia Express
- Grandsire: Henny Hughes
- Dam: Medjerda
- Damsire: Deep Impact
- Sex: Mare
- Foaled: 18 February 2021 (age 5)
- Country: Japan
- Colour: Bay
- Breeder: Murata Bokujo
- Owner: Three H Racing Co. Ltd.
- Racing colours
- Trainer: Shogo Yasuda
- Jockey: Kazuo Yokoyama; Kohei Matsuyama; Christophe Lemaire; Yuichi Kitamura; Hironobu Tanabe; Mirai Iwata
- Record: 22: 8-3-1
- Earnings: ¥441,417,300

Major wins
- Aoi Stakes (2024); Kitakyushu Kinen (2024); Ibis Summer Dash (2025, 2026); Hakodate Sprint Stakes (2026); Sprinters Stakes (2026)
- Last updated on 4 November 2026

Puro Magic (Japanese: ピューロマジック, Pyūro majikku; foaled 18 February 2021) is a Japanese Thoroughbred racehorse known for winning the 2026 Sprinters Stakes and the Ibis Summer Dash twice. She also won several other graded stakes, such as Aoi Stakes, Kitakyushu Kinen and Hakodate Sprint Stakes. In her second win of the Ibis Summer Dash, she broke Calstone Light O's record in which she crossed the finish line at 53.5 seconds. She is known as a front-runner sprinter maniac that has a tremendous ground breaking speed, several times over.

== Background ==
Puro Magic was foaled out of Medjerda, a mare that won one race out of 11 starts with a notable second-place finish in the 2015 Fantasy Stakes. She was sired by Asia Express, a winner of the 2013 Asahi Hai Futurity Stakes and the 2014 Leopard Stakes.

At the 2022 Hokkaido Selection Sales for yearling, she was sold as the hip number 144 for ¥29,700,000 from Murata Bokujo to the Three H Racing Co. Her name came from the Spanish word for pure – Puro and a denotion to make anything possible – Magic.

== Racing career ==
=== 2023: two-year-old season ===
She made her first start in a two-year-old maiden 1400 metre dirt race at Tokyo Racecourse with Keita Tosaki on the saddle. On the day, she was not running well as she finished in 16th place behind the future Haneda Hai winner, Amante Bianco. Her second starts came on the turf in 1500 metres race at Sapporo Racecourse with new jockey, Arata Saito. At this race, he stayed at the back before bursting forward in the final stretch to finish third on the day. Going to her third maiden attempt, she would race in a reduced distance of 1200 metres on turf alongside Arata for the second time. In this race, Puro Magic for the first time went for the front running from the get-go and held on to the lead to win by ten lengths on a slightly softer ground. Saito said after the race that the horse had the potential to compete at the top level but her temperament needs to be checked out for that to happen. Since the front-running strategy worked for her, she opted for this strategy in her first-ever graded race, which was the Fantasy Stakes. She did not feature well, finishing eighth, but Arata said that, in terms of speed alone, she was the best and that she had big potential in 1200–1400 metres races. As a season closure in December, she ran in the Sazanka Sho where she set up the fastest pace on the 1200 metres' Hanshin Racecourse pace and finished in second place, losing to Jesper Noir just by a head. Saito said that the horse ran her best and matched the fast pace really well on the track that day.

=== 2024: three-year-old season ===
She would open the season early in January at an allowance race with another jockey, Ryusei Sakai. She gained her second career win in this race as Sakai claimed that this horse was in different league on that day. After this win, she joined the Marguerite Stakes, a listed race with Kohei Matsuyama. She performed well, finishing second by two and a half lengths behind the winner, Nanao. Matsuyama said that she had an amazing speed and start, but the softer track conditions hindered her later progress, as he wanted to see how she featured on a better track. In May, she ran in her second-ever graded stakes run at the Aoi Stakes alongside another jockey, Kazuo Yokoyama. True to her nature, she burst forward out of the gate and led for most of the race. On the final homestretch, Pair Pollux managed to draw level, but she pulled away once more and held on to win by one and a half lengths and gained her first graded stakes win. Yokoyama described the horse as "too serious" in the race and was surprised by her raw speed as a whole. Capitalizing on her good form, she entered the Kitakyushu Kinen, where Matsuyama was back on the saddle this time around. Her trainer, Shogo Yasuda, hoped that the horse would be able to enter the gate well due to his concern for her temperament leading up to the race day. When the race began, she rapidly gained the lead and never looked back as she held off the challenge of Yoshino Easter in the final stretch to win her second consecutive graded race. Matsuyama was elated that the horse nailed a great start and the track suited for her run as it was.

She was rested and continued her career on her first G2 race, the Centaur Stakes in September, with Yokoyama once again. Yasuda felt confident in the race as the horse was fresh from resting and her form was positive with back-to-back graded stakes wins. Unfortunately, she was gassed out in this race after her early lead and fell back to 13th place on the line. Yokoyama, who was dejected, said it was the best effort for the horse on that day but remained positive about her better upcoming campaign. She ended her season with a run at her first G1 race, the Sprinters Stakes with Kazuo's father, Norihiro Yokoyama as her jockey. As usual, she set up a high pace early on before fading out 50 metres before the line to finish in eighth on the day. After the race, the elder Yokoyama only said that she did her best on the track.

=== 2025: four-year-old season ===
For the second year in a row, Sakai became her starting jockey for a new season. This time, she ran in the Silk Road Stakes in February. Yasuda gave her a period of rest after the Sprinters Stakes last season and set her workout specifically for this race as they monitored her temperament as usual. Sakai propelled her to the lead early, as usual, but her legs tired midway as she was surpassed by several horses and finished ninth on the line. In the post-race interview, Sakai said that the horse's condition was fine, but the slightly heavier track and heavier handicap hindered a bit of her rhythm in the end. In March, Yasuda accepted the invitation to Al Quoz Sprint as he hoped that the horse would run with the same mentality in a different environment. Her jockey this time, Oisin Murphy, did something different as she ran at the back, but she was soon blocked near the final phase. Murphy then switched her to the right side two furlongs from the line and made some ground in the end to finish in fifth place as two of her compatriots, Win Carnelian, and Danon McKinley finished in second and fourth place respectively. Speaking about the run, Murphy said the horse was calm throughout the race despite having some minor restraint as she avoided the collision with How Deep Is Your Love, a Hong Kong trained horse ran in front of her who was getting injured and pulled out midway of the race.

She was off the track for the rest of the first half and returned on the Ibis Summer Dash in September. This time, Yasuda said that her overseas campaign was fully completed, as he thought the horse was fully matured in her career by now, and he initially paired her with Kazuo Yokoyama once again. However, it was changed later as Christophe Lemaire would took the rein on the day as the race day is approaching. Starting from the middle Gate 6, Puro Magic was ridden aggressively from the get-go and surged through the middle as she led the whole way to win her third graded stakes race. In this race, she match the record set up by Calstone Light O in 2004 at 53.7 seconds. Lemaire praised her as a "good student" in this race as she ran exactly as planned by the trainer. One month later, she would try for the second time in the Sprinters Stakes as she was drawn to the innermost Gate 1 at the start. Yasuda felt confident on this draw as he thought that "any gate is good for the horse". Starting on a firm track, Puro Magic broke out from the gate and located herself in third position, chasing the pace maker. She sustained the bid for the win until she was 100 metres from the finish line and dropped to eighth in the end. Matsuyama who returned on her saddle after so long spoke after the race about the final slope which possibly became the reason why she fell back 100 metres from the line. She closed the season with a run another overseas' run as she participated in the Breeders' Cup Turf Sprint alongside Oisin Murphy for the second time. In this race, she ran out of the gate in sixth position before hardly struggling with the bumping in the middle pack that threw her off to the back. She did not make any significant ground and finished in tenth on the line. Just like in Al Quoz Sprint, Murphy said the horse ran well and hit a good start but the conditions made him moving wide than usual as he determined to win with this horse in the future.

=== 2026: five-year-old season ===
In this year, Yasuda picked the Ocean Stakes in February as her season opener, in which Kazuo Yokoyama took the saddle. This race, which was held at Nakayama Racecourse, shocked everyone as Puro Magic set a blazing speed timed at 32.1 seconds on the first three furlongs, before being overtaken by other horses later on to finish 16th. The speed recorded gave huge impressions from the crowd as lots of social comments saying that the horse had entertained them with her raw and incredible speed. The horse's trademark strategy went on to the next race in the Takamatsunomiya Kinen, where she and Invincible Papa led the race early before Satono Reve made a move to the front and carried on the other horses to overtake both of them, as Puro Magic finished 13th. Her new jockey, Yuichi Kitamura, said the plan for the race was to make a big finish, and sadly it was not working for him and the horse. Her next race would be in June at the Hakodate Sprint Stakes. In this race, Kitamura, who stuck as her jockey, set up her normal front-running from the gate strategy and recorded 33.4 seconds for the first three furlongs, which was a fast pace. This pace, however, did not kill her stamina as she maintained the gap and won her fourth graded stakes race by one and a quarter lengths over A T Makfi. Kitamura explained after the race that she is always a great starter and it was just a matter of time that the horse would learn how to utilize her speed on a wider course.

Two months later, she would be racing in the Ibis Summer Dash with a mission to defend her title. Matsuyama was scheduled as her jockey this time but as he broke his right leg one week before the race, Hironobu Tanabe became his replacement. Despite a change of guard at the last minute, Puro Magic just thundered down the field in the race as she went wire to wire and broke the record with a 53.5-second finishing time, 0.2 seconds quicker than the older record she matched last year. Before the race, Tanabe asked Matsuyama and Kitamura about the horse's tendencies, and he fully understood them, as he fully capitalized on her world-class speed in the race. She continued racing in the summer as she participated in the Centaur Stakes in early September with another jockey, Mirai Iwata. In this race, Puro Magic started slow from the gate before catching up to take the lead at the third turn with a lightning 32.8 seconds time for the first three furlongs pace. On the final straight, she went on the inside rail and maintained the lead until Flicker Jab stole the win 50 metres from the line. Iwata reflected that the race went well, except for the draw he got and he just let the winner let through without hustling much as he want to preserve the position he was in. In late September, she joined the Sprinters Stakes for the third time. In the workouts, Yasuda said that he felt the horse's fatigue from her summer racing campaign but understood that the horse fully understood what he and the crowds wanted from her in the race. When the gates opened, Puro Magic broke sharply from the widest stall and quickly assumed command to set the pace. She continued to lead the field, opening a three-length gap over the rest of the field on the corners. Though challenged by World's End and Sound Moryana in the final 100m, she found another gear and managed to cross the wire with a neck to spare. In the post-race, Iwata was concerned about the ground condition, but it did not matter in the end as her speed was optimal throughout the race. This was her first G1 title, Iwata's first Sprinters Stakes title, Murata Bokujo's first G1 title as a breeder since Laurel Guerreiro in 2009, and Asia Express's first G1 title as a sire.

== Racing form ==
Puro Magic won eight races and placed four times out of 22 starts. This data is available based on JBIS, netkeiba, Racing Post, and Equibase.

Date	Track	Race	Grade	Distance (Condition)	Entry	HN	Odds (Favored)	Finish	Time	Margins	Jockey	Winner (Runner-up)
2023 – two-year-old season
Jun 17	Tokyo	2yo Newcomer		1,400 m (Fast)	16	6	4.3 (2)	16th	1:31.3	5.8	Keita Tosaki	Amante Bianco
Aug 6	Sapporo	2yo Maiden		1,500 m (Soft)	14	14	49.3 (10)	3rd	1:33.3	0.2	Arata Saito	Reve Genial
Sep 2	Sapporo	2yo Maiden		1,200 m (Good)	8	5	2.7 (1)	1st	1:09.8	–1.7	Arata Saito	(Rinen Waltz)
Nov 4	Kyoto	Fantasy Stakes	GIII	1,400 m (Firm)	18	3	13.8 (7)	8th	1:21.0	0.6	Arata Saito	Culture Day
Dec 2	Hanshin	Sazanka Sho (ALW)	1W	1,200 m (Firm)	10	1	4.2 (2)	2nd	1:08.5	0.0	Arata Saito	Jasper Noir
2024 – three-year-old season
Jan 6	Kyoto	3yo Allowance	1W	1,200 m (Firm)	10	2	1.3 (1)	1st	1:08.8	–0.3	Ryusei Sakai	(Uncle Cross)
Feb 25	Hanshin	Marguerite Stakes	L	1,200 m (Soft)	11	8	5.2 (3)	2nd	1:09.8	0.4	Kohei Matsuyama	Nanao
May 25	Kyoto	Aoi Stakes	GIII	1,200 m (Firm)	18	17	24.1 (8)	1st	1:07.1	–0.2	Kazuo Yokoyama	(Pair Pollux)
Jun 30	Kokura	Kitakyushu Kinen	GIII	1,200 m (Good)	18	12	7.3 (3)	1st	1:07.9	–0.1	Kohei Matsuyama	(Yoshino Easter)
Sep 8	Chukyo	Centaur Stakes	GII	1,200 m (Firm)	18	13	3.9 (1)	13th	1:08.4	0.7	Kazuo Yokoyama	Toshin Macau
Sep 29	Nakayama	Sprinters Stakes	GI	1,200 m (Firm)	16	10	34.5 (10)	8th	1:07.5	0.5	Norihiro Yokoyama	Lugal
2025 – four-year-old season
Feb 2	Kyoto	Silk Road Stakes	GIII	1,200 m (Good)	16	2	3.6 (1)	9th	1:08.8	0.6	Ryusei Sakai	A Shin Fencer
Apr 5	Meydan	Al Quoz Sprint	GI	1,200 m (Firm)	11	10	25.0 (8)	5th	1:08.2	0.4	Oisin Murphy	Believing
Aug 3	Niigata	Ibis Summer Dash	GIII	1,000 m (Firm)	18	6	4.6 (2)	1st	0:53.7	–0.1	Christophe Lemaire	(T M Spada)
Sep 28	Nakayama	Sprinters Stakes	GI	1,200 m (Firm)	16	1	10.5 (5)	8th	1:07.4	0.5	Kohei Matsuyama	Win Carnelian
Nov 1	Del Mar	Breeders' Cup Turf Sprint	GI	5 f (Firm)	16	13	23.0 (10)	10th	0:57.2	2.0	Oisin Murphy	Shisospicy
2026 – five-year-old season
Feb 28	Nakayama	Ocean Stakes	GIII	1,200 m (Firm)	16	10	29.5 (9)	16th	1:08.3	1.3	Kazuo Yokoyama	Pair Pollux
Mar 29	Chukyo	Takamatsunomiya Kinen	GI	1,200 m (Firm)	18	12	117.6 (17)	13th	1:07.7	1.4	Yuichi Kitamura	Satono Reve
Jun 13	Hakodate	Hakodate Sprint Stakes	GIII	1,200 m (Good)	12	7	8.1 (6)	1st	1:07.4	–0.2	Yuichi Kitamura	(A T Makfi)
Aug 2	Niigata	Ibis Summer Dash	GIII	1,000 m (Firm)	17	6	2.7 (1)	1st	R0:53.5	–0.5	Hironobu Tanabe	(Lord Trail)
Sep 6	Hanshin	Centaur Stakes	GII	1,200 m (Firm)	16	9	4.6 (2)	2nd	1:07.0	0.1	Mirai Iwata	Flicker Jab
Sep 27	Nakayama	Sprinters Stakes	GI	1,200 m (Good)	16	16	24.5 (9)	1st	1:09.2	0.0	Mirai Iwata	(World's End)

Legend:
Turf Dirt

- R indicated that it was a record time finish

== Pedigree ==
Pedigree of Puro Magic (JPN), bay mare, 2021
Sire Asia Express (JPN) 2011	Henny Hughes (USA); 2003	Hennessy	Storm Cat
Sire Asia Express (JPN) 2011	Henny Hughes (USA); 2003	Hennessy	Island Kitty
Sire Asia Express (JPN) 2011	Henny Hughes (USA); 2003	Meadow Flyer	Meadowlake
Sire Asia Express (JPN) 2011	Henny Hughes (USA); 2003	Meadow Flyer	Shortley
Sire Asia Express (JPN) 2011	Running Bobcats (USA); 2002	Running Stag	Cozzene
Sire Asia Express (JPN) 2011	Running Bobcats (USA); 2002	Running Stag	Fruhlingstag
Sire Asia Express (JPN) 2011	Running Bobcats (USA); 2002	Backatem	Notebook
Sire Asia Express (JPN) 2011	Running Bobcats (USA); 2002	Backatem	Deputy's Mistress
Dam Medjerda (JPN) 2013 F. no: 20	Deep Impact (JPN); 2002	Sunday Silence	Halo
Dam Medjerda (JPN) 2013 F. no: 20	Deep Impact (JPN); 2002	Sunday Silence	Wishing Well
Dam Medjerda (JPN) 2013 F. no: 20	Deep Impact (JPN); 2002	Wind in Her Hair	Alzao
Dam Medjerda (JPN) 2013 F. no: 20	Deep Impact (JPN); 2002	Wind in Her Hair	Burghclere
Dam Medjerda (JPN) 2013 F. no: 20	Melusine (JPN); 2006	French Deputy	Deputy Minister
Dam Medjerda (JPN) 2013 F. no: 20	Melusine (JPN); 2006	French Deputy	Mitterand
Dam Medjerda (JPN) 2013 F. no: 20	Melusine (JPN); 2006	Megere	Tabasco Cat
Dam Medjerda (JPN) 2013 F. no: 20	Melusine (JPN); 2006	Megere	Kaspersky Gold

- Puro Magic is an inbred by 4 x 5 to Storm Cat (Tabasco Cat's sire), 4 x 5 to Deputy Minister (Deputy's Mistress's sire), and 5 x 5 to Hold Your Peace (Meadowlake's and Mitterand's sire)
