= List of Japanese flat horse races =

This is a list of notable flat horse races held annually in Japan.

== Overview ==
With the exception of the Tokyo Daishōten, all graded races, including every race currently designated as Grade 1, 2, or 3, are organized by the Japan Racing Association (JRA). In Japanese, these prestigious events are known as 重賞 (Jyūshō), which translates literally to “Big race”.

== List (JRA) ==
=== Grade 1 ===
Month	Race Name	Racecourse	Dist. (m)	Age/Sex	2026 winner (2025 winner in italics)	2025 win prize
February	February Stakes	Tokyo (dirt)^{[a]}	1,600	4yo+	Costa Nova	¥120,000,000
March	Takamatsunomiya Kinen	Chukyo^{[b]}^{[c]}^{[d]}	1,200	4yo+	Satono Reve	¥170,000,000
March	Ōsaka Hai	Hanshin^{[e]}^{[f]}	2,000	4yo+	Croix du Nord	¥300,000,000
April	Oka Sho	Hanshin^{[e]}^{[f]}^{[g]}	1,600	3yo f	Star Anise	¥140,000,000
April	Satsuki Shō	Nakayama^{[h]}^{[i]}^{[j]}	2,000	3yo c&f, no g	Lovcen	¥200,000,000
April	Tennō Shō (Spring)	Kyoto^{[k]}^{[l]}	3,200	4yo+	Croix du Nord	¥300,000,000
May	NHK Mile Cup	Tokyo	1,600	3yo c&f, no g	Rodeo Drive	¥130,000,000
May	Victoria Mile	Tokyo	1,600	4yo+ f	Embroidery	¥130,000,000
May	Yushun Himba	Tokyo^{[m]}^{[n]}	2,400	3yo f	Juryoku Pierrot	¥150,000,000
May	Tōkyō Yūshun	Tokyo^{[o]}	2,400	3yo c&f, no g	Lovcen	¥300,000,000
June	Yasuda Kinen	Tokyo^{[p]}	1,600	3yo+	Sixpence	¥180,000,000
June	Takarazuka Kinen	Hanshin^{[f]}^{[q]}^{[r]}^{[s]}	2,200	3yo+	Meisho Tabaru	¥300,000,000
September	Sprinters Stakes	Nakayama^{[t]}^{[u]}^{[v]}	1,200	3yo+	Puro Magic	¥170,000,000
October	Shūka Sho	Kyoto^{[l]}	2,000	3yo f	Monroe Walk	¥110,000,000
October	Kikuka-shō	Kyoto^{[l]}	3,000	3yo c&f, no g	Going to Sky	¥200,000,000
October	Tennō Shō (Autumn)	Tokyo^{[p]}^{[w]}	2,000	3yo+	Danon Decile	¥300,000,000
November	Queen Elizabeth II Cup	Kyoto^{[b]}^{[x]}	2,200	3yo+ f	Laughterlines	¥130,000,000
November	Mile Championship	Kyoto^{[x]}	1,600	3yo+	Erdenali	¥180,000,000
November	Japan Cup	Tokyo^{[w]}	2,400	3yo+	Calandagan	¥500,000,000
December	Champions Cup	Chukyo (dirt)^{[y]}^{[z]}^{[aa]}	1,800	3yo+	W Heart Bond	¥120,000,000
December	Hanshin Juvenile Fillies	Hanshin^{[ab]}^{ac}	1,600	2yo f	Star Anise	¥65,000,000
December	Asahi Hai Futurity Stakes	Hanshin^{[ad]}	1,600	2yo c&f, no g	Cavallerizzo	¥70,000,000
December	Arima Kinen	Nakayama	2,500	3yo+	Museum Mile	¥500,000,000
December	Hopeful Stakes	Nakayama^{[ae]}^{[af]}	2,000	2yo c&f, no g	Lovcen	¥70,000,000

=== Grade 2 ===
Month	Race Name	Racecourse	Dist. (m)	Age/Sex	2026 winner (2025 winner in italics)
January	Nikkei Shinshun Hai	Kyoto	2,400	4yo+	Goltzschtal
January	American Jockey Club Cup	Nakayama	2,200	4yo+	Shohei
January	Procyon Stakes	Chukyo (dirt)	1,800	4yo+	Lord Couronne
February	Kyoto Kinen	Kyoto	2,200	4yo+	June Take
February	Nakayama Kinen	Nakayama	1,800	4yo+	Lebensstil
March	Tulip Sho	Hanshin	1,600	3yo f	Taisei Vogue
March	Yayoi Sho	Nakayama	2,000	3yo	Basse Terre
March	Fillies' Revue	Hanshin	1,400	3yo f	Ghillies' Ball
March	Kinko Sho	Chukyo	2,000	4yo+	Shake Your Heart
March	Spring Stakes	Nakayama	1,800	3yo c&f	Audacia
March	Hanshin Daishoten	Hanshin	3,000	4yo+	Admire Terra
March	Nikkei Sho	Nakayama	2,500	4yo+	My Universe
April	New Zealand Trophy	Nakayama	1,600	3yo c&f	Reservation
April	Hanshin Himba Stakes	Hanshin	1,600	4yo+ f	Embroidery
April	Flora Stakes	Tokyo	2,000	3yo f	Laughterlines
April	Yomiuri Milers Cup	Kyoto	1,600	4yo+	Admire Zoom
April	Aoba Sho	Tokyo	2,400	3yo	Going to Sky
May	Kyoto Shimbun Hai	Kyoto	2,200	3yo	Congestus
May	Keio Hai Spring Cup	Tokyo	1,400	4yo+	World's End
May	Meguro Kinen	Tokyo	2,500	4yo+	Feiern Kranz
August	Sapporo Kinen	Sapporo	2,000	3yo+	Shake Your Heart
September	Shion Stakes	Nakayama	2,000	3yo f	Master Soarer
September	Centaur Stakes	Hanshin	1,200	3yo+	Flicker Jab
September	Rose Stakes	Hanshin	1,800	3yo f	Monroe Walk
September	St Lite Kinen	Nakayama	2,200	3yo	Justin Chicago
September	Sankei Sho All Comers	Nakayama	2,200	3yo+	Meisho Gekirin
September	Kobe Shimbun Hai	Hanshin	2,400	3yo c&f	Lovcen
October	Mainichi Okan	Tokyo	1,800	3yo+	Seiun Hades
October	Kyoto Daishoten	Kyoto	2,400	3yo+	Ecoro Dinos
October	Ireland Trophy	Tokyo	1,800	3yo+ f	Kamunyak
October	Fuji Stakes	Tokyo	1,600	3yo+	Sugar Kun
October	Swan Stakes	Kyoto	1,400	3yo+	Diamond Knot
November	Keio Hai Nisai Stakes	Tokyo	1,400	2yo	Blue Jay
November	Copa Republica Argentina	Tokyo	2,500	3yo+	Family Time
November	Daily Hai Nisai Stakes	Kyoto	1,600	2yo	Brad Barows
November	Tokyo Sports Hai Nisai Stakes	Tokyo	1,800	2yo	Peintre Naif
November	Stayers Stakes	Nakayama	3,600	3yo+	Hohelied
December	Hanshin Cup	Hanshin	1,400	3yo+	Lugal

=== Grade 3 ===
Month	Race Name	Racecourse	Dist. (m)	Age/Sex	2026 winner (2025 winner in italics)
January	Nakayama Kimpai	Nakayama	2,000	4yo+	Kalamatianos
January	Kyoto Kimpai	Kyoto	1,600	4yo+	Buena Onda
January	Fairy Stakes	Nakayama	1,600	3yo f	Black Chalice
January	Shinzan Kinen	Kyoto	1,600	3yo	Thunderstruck
January	Keisei Hai	Nakayama	2,000	3yo	Green Energy
January	Kokura Himba Stakes	Kokura	2,000	4yo+ f	Jocelyn
February	Negishi Stakes	Tokyo (dirt)	1,400	4yo+	Lord Fons
February	Silk Road Stakes	Kyoto	1,200	4yo+	Fioraia
February	Tokyo Shimbun Hai	Tokyo	1,600	4yo+	Trovatore
February	Kisaragi Sho	Kyoto	1,800	3yo	Zoroastro
February	Queen Cup	Tokyo	1,600	3yo f	Dream Core
February	Tokinominoru Kinen	Tokyo	1,800	3yo	Realize Sirius
February	Diamond Stakes	Tokyo	3,400	4yo+	Stinger Glass
February	Kokura Daishoten	Kokura	1,800	4yo+	Tagano Dude
February	Hankyu Hai	Hanshin	1,400	4yo+	Sonshi
March	Aichi Hai	Chukyo	1,400	4yo+ f	Ai Sansan
March	Ocean Stakes	Nakayama	1,200	4yo+	Pair Pollux
March	Nakayama Himba Stakes	Nakayama	1,800	4yo+ f	Ethelfleda
March	Flower Cup	Nakayama	1,800	3yo f	Smart Priere
March	Falcon Stakes	Chukyo	1,400	3yo	Diamond Knot
March	Mainichi Hai	Hanshin	1,800	3yo	Altramuz
March	March Stakes	Nakayama (dirt)	1,800	4yo+	Sunday Funday
March	Lord Derby Challenge Trophy	Nakayama	1,600	4yo+	Suzu Khalom
April	Churchill Downs Cup	Hanshin	1,600	3yo	Ask Ikigomi
April	Antares Stakes	Hanshin (dirt)	1,800	4yo+	Meursault
April	Fukushima Himba Stakes	Fukushima	1,800	4yo+ f	Koganeno Sora
April	Niigata Daishoten	Niigata	2,000	4yo+	Gran Dia
April	Unicorn Stakes	Kyoto (dirt)	1,900	3yo	Silver Ratio
May	Heian Stakes	Kyoto (dirt)	1,900	4yo+	Lord Couronne
May	Aoi Stakes	Kyoto	1,200	3yo	Dea Veloce
June	Epsom Cup	Tokyo	1,800	3yo+	Trovatore
June	Fuchu Himba Stakes	Tokyo	1,800	3yo+ f	Sekitoba East
June	Hakodate Sprint Stakes	Hakodate	1,200	3yo+	Puro Magic
June	Radio Nikkei Sho	Fukushima	1,800	3yo	Sanono Greater
June	Kitakyushu Kinen	Kokura	1,200	3yo+	Flicker Jab
June	Shirasagi Stakes	Hanshin	1,600	3yo+	Elton Barows
July	Tanabata Sho	Fukushima	2,000	3yo+	Ask Nice Show
July	Tokai Stakes	Chukyo (dirt)	1,400	3yo+	Matenro Command
July	Hakodate Kinen	Hakodate	2,000	3yo+	Faust Rasen
July	Chukyo Kinen	Chukyo	1,600	3yo+	Lavanda
July	Hakodate Nisai Stakes	Hakodate	1,200	2yo	Felicita
July	Ibis Summer Dash	Niigata	1,000	3yo+	Puro Magic
July	Queen Stakes	Sapporo	1,800	3yo+ f	Coconuts Brown
August	Leopard Stakes	Niigata (dirt)	1,800	3yo	Coeli Vento
August	Kokura Kinen	Kokura	2,000	3yo+	Zendan Hayabusa
August	Sekiya Kinen	Niigata	1,600	3yo+	Ampadu
August	CBC Sho	Chukyo	1,200	3yo+	From Dusk
August	Elm Stakes	Sapporo (dirt)	1,700	3yo+	Luxor Cafe
August	Niigata Nisai Stakes	Niigata	1,600	2yo	Lotschberg
August	Keeneland Cup	Sapporo	1,200	3yo+	Sound Moryana
August	Sapporo Nisai Stakes	Sapporo	1,800	2yo	Shonan Galleon
August	Chukyo Nisai Stakes	Chukyo	1,400	2yo	G T Maika
September	Niigata Kinen	Niigata	2,000	3yo+	Zoroastro
September	Keisei Hai Autumn Handicap	Nakayama	1,600	3yo+	Piko Rose
September	Challenge Cup	Hanshin	2,000	3yo+	Giovanni
September	Sirius Stakes	Hanshin (dirt)	2,000	3yo+	Walzer Schall
October	Saudi Arabia Royal Cup	Tokyo	1,600	2yo	Agordino
October	Artemis Stakes	Tokyo	1,600	2yo f	Pulvinar
November	Fantasy Stakes	Kyoto	1,400	2yo f	Nix Luna
November	Miyako Stakes	Kyoto (dirt)	1,800	3yo+	Lord Couronne
November	Musashino Stakes	Tokyo (dirt)	1,600	3yo+	Le Valet d'Coeur
November	Fukushima Kinen	Fukushima	2,000	3yo+	Maglia Iridata
November	Kyoto Nisai Stakes	Kyoto	2,000	2yo	Justin Vista
November	Keihan Hai	Kyoto	1,200	3yo+	A T Makfi
December	Naruo Kinen	Hanshin	1,800	3yo+	David Barows
December	Chunichi Shimbun Hai	Chukyo	2,000	3yo+	Shake Your Heart
December	Capella Stakes	Nakayama (dirt)	1,200	3yo+	T O Elvis
December	Turquoise Stakes	Nakayama	1,600	3yo+ f	Drop of Light

=== Listed ===
From 2019, Japan Racing Association introduced new "Listed" category, prize value is higher than normal open race.

Month	Race Name	Racecourse	Dist. (m)	Age/Sex	2026 winner (2025 winner in italics)
January	Junior Cup	Nakayama	1,600	3yo	Resort Island
January	Kobai Stakes	Kyoto	1,400	3yof	Lily Joie
January	Wakagoma Stakes	Kyoto	2,000	3yo	Shonan Hayanami
January	New Year Stakes	Nakayama	1,600	4yo+	Ka Pilina
January	Yodo Tankyori Stakes	Kyoto	1,200	4yo+	Yabusame
January	Subaru Stakes	Kyoto (dirt)	1,400	4yo+	Kitano's Edge
January	Crocus Stakes	Tokyo	1,400	3yo	Hornero
January	Shirafuji Stakes	Tokyo	2,000	4yo+	Danon Cima
February	Elfin Stakes	Kyoto	1,600	3yo f	Sweet Happiness
February	Rakuyo Stakes	Kyoto	1,600	4yo+	Suzu Khalom
February	Hyacinth Stakes	Tokyo (dirt)	1,600	3yo	Lucky Kid
February/March	Nigawa Stakes	Hanshin (dirt)	2,000	4yo+	June Aoniyoshi
February/March	Sumire Stakes	Hanshin	2,200	3yo	Large Ensemble
February	Marguerite Stakes	Hanshin	1,200	3yo	Tamamo Icarus
March	Osakajo Stakes	Hanshin	1,800	4yo+	Dragon Boost
March	Anemone Stakes	Nakayama	1,600	3yo	Dear Diamond
March	Coral Stakes	Hanshin (dirt)	1,400	4yo+	Justin Earth
March	Kochi Stakes	Nakayama	1,600	4yo+	Valkyrie Birth
March	Wakaba Stakes	Hanshin	2,000	3yo	Matenro Gale
March	Rokko Stakes	Hanshin	1,600	4yo+	Bellagio Bond
April	Shunrai Stakes	Nakayama	1,200	4yo+	Craspedia
April	Wasurenagusa Sho	Hanshin	2,000	3yof	Juryoku Pierrot
April	Fukushima Mimpo Hai	Fukushima	2,000	4yo+	Savona
April	Keiyo Stakes	Nakayama (dirt)	1,200	4yo+	Namura Frank
April	Oasis Stakes	Tokyo (dirt)	1,600	4yo+	Don in the Mood
April/May	Sweetpea Stakes	Tokyo	1,800	3yof	Canal Saint Martin
May	Principal Stakes	Tokyo	2,000	3yo	Meisho Hachiko
May	Brilliant Stakes	Tokyo (dirt)	2,100	4yo+	Tight Knit
May	Metropolitan Stakes	Tokyo	2,400	4yo+	West Now
May	Tachibana Stakes	Kyoto	1,400	3yo	Tagano Aralia
May	Tanigawadake Stakes	Niigata	1,400	4yo+	Run for Vow
May	Ritto Stakes	Kyoto (dirt)	1,400	4yo+	Tagano Mist
May	Miyakooji Stakes	Kyoto	1,800	4yo+	Gaiamente
May	Hosu Stakes	Kyoto (dirt)	1,800	3yo	Itterasshai
May	Shirayuri Stakes	Kyoto	1,800	3yo	Rosa Rugosa
May	Azuchijo Stakes	Kyoto	1,400	4yo+	Ecoro Bloom
June	Paradise Stakes	Tokyo	1,400	3yo+	Meiner Ticket
July	Onuma Stakes	Hakodate (dirt)	1,700	3yo+	Wide Blizzard
July/August	Sapporo Nikkei Open	Sapporo	2,600	3yo+	Mirage Knight
August	Meitetsu Hai	Chukyo (dirt)	1,800	3yo+	Cours Mirabeau
August	Toki Stakes	Niigata	1,400	3yo+	Shonan Xanadu
August	Bsn Sho	Niigata (dirt)	1,800	3yo+	Meisho Zuiun
August	Cluster Cup	Morioka	1,200	3yo+	Anzu Ame
September	Enf Stakes	Hanshin (dirt)	1,400	3yo+	God Blue Bee
September/October	Port Island Stakes	Hanshin	1,600	3yo+	Danon Century
October	Opal Sprint Stakes	Kyoto	1,200	3yo+	Lily Joie
October	Green Channel Stakes	Tokyo	1,400	3yo+	Don Erectus
October	October Stakes	Tokyo	2,000	3yo+	Ask Sexy More
October	Shinetsu Stakes	Niigata	1,400	3yo+	Daddy's Vivid
October	Ivy Stakes	Tokyo	1,800	2yo	Capital Stone
October	Brazil Cup	Tokyo	2,100	3yo+	Cours Mirabeau
October	Niigata Himba Stakes	Niigata	2,200	3yo+	Shadow Meteor
October	Hagi Stakes	Kyoto	1,800	2yo	Ippei
October	Lumiere Autumn Dash	Niigata	1,000	3yo+	Mozu Nana Star
October	Cassiopeia Stakes	Kyoto	1,800	3yo+	Deal Maker
November	Mahoroba Stakes	Kyoto	1,600	3yo+	Reservation
November	Andromeda Stakes	Kyoto	2,000	3yo+	Baddeleyte
November	Fukushima Minyu Cup	Fukushima (dirt)	1,700	3yo+	God Blue Bee
November	Oro Cup	Tokyo	1,400	3yo+	Ecoro Alba
November	Capital Stakes	Tokyo	1,600	3yo+
December	December Stakes	Nakayama	1,800	3yo+

=== Other Open Races ===
Month	Race Name	Racecourse	Dist. (m)	Age/Sex
January	Manyo Stakes	Kyoto	3,000	4yo+
January	January Stakes	Nakayama (dirt)	1,200	4yo+
January	Polloux Stakes	Nakayama (dirt)	1,800	4yo+
January	Carbuncle Stakes	Nakayama	1,200	4yo+
January	Mutsuki Stakes	Kyoto	1,600	4yo+
February	Kinpai	Ohi	2,600	4yo
February	Moji Stakes	Kokura (dirt)	1,700	4yo+
February	Aldebaran Stakes	Kyoto (dirt)	1,900	4yo+
February	Kokura Nikkei Sho	Kokura	2,000	4yo+
February	Yamato Stakes	Kyoto (dirt)	1,200	4yo+
February	Valentine Stakes	Tokyo (dirt)	1,400	4yo+
February	Kitakyushu Tankyori Stakes	Kokura	1,200	4yo+
February	Reigetsu Stakes	Hanshin (dirt)	1,200	4yo+
March	Fukuryu Stakes	Nakayama (dirt)	1,800	3yo
March	Sobu Stakes	Nakayama (dirt)	1,800	4yo+
March	Yonagojo Stakes	Hanshin	1,200	4yo+
March	Shoryu Stakes	Chukyo (dirt)	1,400	3yo
March	Chiba Stakes	Nakayama (dirt)	1,200	4yo+
March	Regulus Stakes	Hanshin (dirt)	1,800	4yo+
April	Polaris Stakes	Hanshin (dirt)	1,400	4yo+
April	Violet Stakes	Hanshin (dirt)	1,400	3yo
April	Osaka-Hamburg Cup	Hanshin	2,600	4yo+
April	Azumakofuji Stakes	Fukushima (dirt)	1,700	4yo+
April	Tennozan Stakes	Kyoto (dirt)	1,200	4yo+
April	Morganite Stakes	Fukushima	1,200	4yo+
May	Keyaki Stakes	Tokyo (dirt)	1,400	4yo+
May	Echigo Stakes	Niigata (dirt)	1,200	4yo+
May	Seiryu Stakes	Tokyo (dirt)	1,600	3yo
May	Heijokyo Stakes	Kyoto (dirt)	1,800	4yo+
May	Kurama Stakes	Kyoto	1,200	4yo+
May	Keyaki Stakes	Tokyo (dirt)	1,400	4yo+
May	Akhalteke Stakes	Tokyo (dirt)	1,600	4yo+
June	Minazuki Stakes	Hanshin (dirt)	1,200	3yo+
June	June Stakes	Tokyo	1,800	3yo+
June	Sannomiya Stakes	Hanshin (dirt)	1,800	3yo+
June	Sleipnir Stakes	Tokyo (dirt)	2,100	3yo+
June	Tempozan Stakes	Hanshin (dirt)	1,400	3yo+
June	Seikan Stakes	Hakodate	1,200	3yo+
July	July Stakes	Fukushima (dirt)	1,700	3yo+
July	Adatara Stakes	Fukushima	1,200	3yo+
July	Aso Stakes	Kokura (dirt)	1,700	3yo+
July	Tomoe Sho	Hakodate	1,800	3yo+
July	Himawari Sho	Kokura	1,200	2yo
July	Marine Stakes	Hakodate (dirt)	1,700	3yo+
July	Fukushima Tv Sho	Fukushima (dirt)	1,150	3yo+
August	Dahlia Sho	Niigata	1,400	2yo
August	Kanetsu Stakes	Niigata	1,800	3yo+
August	Uhb Sho	Sapporo	1,200	3yo+
August	Cosmos Sho	Sapporo	1,800	2yo
August	Nst Sho	Niigata (dirt)	1,200	3yo+
August	Clover Sho	Sapporo	1,500	2yo
August	Nagoyajo Stakes	Chukyo (dirt)	1,800	3yo+
August	Suzuran Sho	Sapporo	1,200	2yo
August	Takeyoriwake Sho	Kochi	1,400	3yo+
August	Himawari Sho	Kokura	1,200	2yo Kyushu bred
September	Tancho Stakes	Sapporo	2,600	3yo+
September	Radio Nippon Sho	Nakayama (dirt)	1,200	3yo+
September	Canna Stakes	Nakayama	1,200	2yo
September	Nagatsuki Stakes	Nakayama (dirt)	1,800	3yo+
September	Nojigiku Stakes	Hanshin	1,600	2yo
September	Fuyo Stakes	Nakayama	2,000	2yo
October	Fujinomori Stakes	Kyoto (dirt)	1,200	3yo+
October	Uzumasa Stakes	Kyoto (dirt)	1,800	3yo+
October	Momiji Stakes	Kyoto	1,400	2yo
October	Kannazuki Stakes	Tokyo (dirt)	1,400	3yo+
October	Canopus Stakes	Kyoto (dirt)	1,800	3yo+
October	Perseus Stakes	Tokyo (dirt)	1,600	3yo+
November	Muromachi Stakes	Kyoto (dirt)	1,200	3yo+
November	Michinoku Stakes	Fukushima	1,200	3yo+
November	Fukushima Nisai Stakes	Fukushima	1,200	2yo
November	Cattleya Stakes	Tokyo (dirt)	1,600	2yo

== List (NAR) ==
Many are listed race in international, but some are not.

=== Grade 1 ===
Month	Race Name	Racecourse	Dist. (m)	Age/Sex	2026 winner (2025 winner in italics)	2025 win prize
December	Tokyo Daishōten	Ohi	2,000	3yo+	Diktaean	¥100,000,000

=== JpnI ===
Month	Race Name	Racecourse	Dist. (m)	Age/Sex	2026 winner (2025 winner in italics)	2025 win prize
April	Kawasaki Kinen	Kawasaki	2,100	4yo+	Kazeno Runner	¥100,000,000
April	Haneda Hai	Ohi	1,800	3yo	Finger	¥50,000,000
May	Kashiwa Kinen	Funabashi	1,600	4yo+	Wilson Tesoro	¥80,000,000
June	Tokyo Derby	Ohi	2,000	3yo	Finger	¥100,000,000
June	Sakitama Hai	Urawa	1,400	3yo+	Lord Fons	¥80,000,000
June	Teio Sho	Ohi	2,000	4yo+	Mikki Fight	¥80,000,000
October	Japan Dirt Classic	Ohi	2,000	3yo	Silver Ratio	¥70,000,000
October	Mile Championship Nambu Hai	Morioka	1,600	3yo+	Meisho Hachiro	¥80,000,000
November	JBC Ladies' Classic	Various	1,800	3yo+f	Anzu Ame	¥60,000,000
November	JBC Sprint	Various	1,200	3yo+	Meisho Hachiro	¥80,000,000
November	JBC Classic	Various	2,000	3yo+	Outrange	¥100,000,000
December	Zen-Nippon Nisai Yushun	Kawasaki	1,600	2yo	Pyromancer	¥42,000,000

=== JpnII ===
Month	Race Name	Racecourse	Dist. (m)	Age/Sex
March	Diolite Kinen	Funabashi	2,400	4yo+
March	Keihin Hai	Ohi	1,700	3yo
May	Hyogo Championship	Sonoda	1,400	3yo
May	Nagoya Grand Prix	Nagoya	2,100	4yo+
May	Empress Hai	Kawasaki	2,100	4yo+ f
June	Kanto Oaks	Kawasaki	2,100	3yo f
September	Furukata Award	Morioka	2,000	3yo
October	Nippon TV Hai	Funabashi	1,800	3yo+
October	Ladies' Prelude	Ohi	1,800	3yo+f
October	Tokyo Hai	Ohi	1,200	3yo+
November	Urawa Kinen	Urawa	2,000	3yo+
November	Hyogo Junior Grand Prix	Sonoda	1,400	2yo

=== JpnIII ===
Month	Race Name	Racecourse	Dist. (m)	Age/Sex
January	Bluebird Cup	Funabashi	1,800	3yo
February	Queen Sho	Funabashi	1,800	4yo+ f
February	Saga Kinen	Saga	2,000	4yo+
February	Kumotori Sho	Ohi	1,800	3yo
February	Iris Kinen	Nagoya	1,500	4yo+
March	Kurofune Sho	Kochi	1,400	4yo+
April	Hyogo Queen Cup	Sonoda	1,870	4yo+ f
April	Tokyo Sprint	Ohi	1,200	4yo+
July	Sparking Lady Cup	Kawasaki	1,600	3yo+ f
July	Mercury Cup	Morioka	2,000	3yo+
August	Cluster Cup	Morioka	1,200	3yo+
August	Hokkaido Sprint Cup	Monbetsu	1,200	3yo
August	Breeders' Gold Cup	Monbetsu	2,000	3yo+ f
August	Summer Champion	Saga	1,400	3yo+
September	Oval Sprint	Urawa	1,400	3yo+
September	Hakusan Daishoten	Kanazawa	2,100	3yo+
September	Marine Cup	Funabashi	1.800	3yo f
October	Edelweiss Sho	Monbetsu	1,200	2yo f
November	JBC Nisai Yushun	Monbetsu	1,800	2yo
December	Nagoya Daishoten	Nagoya	2,000	3yo+
December	Hyogo Gold Trophy	Sonoda	1,400	3yo+

== Former race ==
Last run	Race Name	Racecourse	Dist. (m)	Age/Sex
Mar 1993	Pegasus Stakes	Hanshin	1,600	3yo
March 2005	Crystal Cup	Nakayama	1,200	3yo
April 2004	Kabutoyama Kinen	Fukushima	1,800	4yo+ sire domestic bred
May 1999	Kyoto Yonsai Tokubetsu	Kyoto	2,000	3yo
Sep 1993	Sapphire Stakes	Hanshin	1,800	3yof
October 1975	Victoria Cup	Kyoto	2,400	3yof

== Notes ==
^{a} The 2003 running took place at Nakayama while Tokyo Racecourse was closed for redevelopment.

^{b} The 1979 running took place at Hanshin.

^{c} The 1993 running took place at Kyoto.

^{d} The 2011 running took place at Hanshin while Chukyo was closed for redevelopment.

^{e} The 1991 running took place at Kyoto while Hanshin was closed for redevelopment.

^{f} The 1995 running took place at Kyoto while Hanshin was closed due to 1995 Great Hanshin earthquake.

^{g} The 1939-1943 runnings took place at Nakayama, the 1944 running took place at Tokyo and the 1947, 1948 and 1949 runnings took place at Kyoto as Hanshin's construction was completed only in 1949.

^{h} The 1939-1942 runnings took place at Yokohama.

^{i} The 1943, 1944, 1947, 1948, 1956, 1963, 1964, 1974, 1976 and 1988 runnings took place at Tokyo.

^{j} The 2011 running took place at Tokyo while Nakayama was closed due to 2011 Tohoku earthquake and tsunami.

^{k} The 1994 running took place at Hanshin.

^{l} The 2021 and 2022 runnings took place at Hanshin while Kyoto was closed for redevelopment.

^{m} The 1938-1942 runnings took place at Hanshin.

^{n} The 1943 running took place at Kyoto.

^{o} The 1932 and 1933 runnings took place at Meguro.

^{p} The 1967 running took place at Nakayama.

^{q} The 1966, 1969, 1974 and 1976 runnings took place at Kyoto.

^{r} The 1980 running took place at Chukyo.

^{s} The 1991, 2006, and 2024 runnings took place at Kyoto while Hanshin was closed for redevelopment.

^{t} The 1980 running took place at Tokyo.

^{u} The 2002 running took place at Niigata.

^{v} The 2014 running took place at Niigata while Nakayama was closed for redevelopment.

^{w} The 2002 running took place at Nakayama while Tokyo was closed for redevelopment.

^{x} The 2020, 2021 and 2022 runnings took place at Hanshin while Kyoto was closed for redevelopment.

^{y} The 2000, 2001 and 2003-2007 runnings took place at Tokyo.

^{z} The 2002 running took place at Nakayama.

^{aa} The 2008-2012 runnings took place at Hanshin.

^{ab} The 1956 and 1980 runnings took place at Kyoto.

^{ac} The 1990 running took place at Kyoto while Hanshin was closed for redevelopment.

^{ad} The 1949-2013 runnings took place at Nakayama.

^{ae} The 1984-1989 and 1991-2013 runnings took place at Hanshin.

^{af} The 1990 running took place at Kyoto.
