= Curren Chan =

Japanese-bred Thoroughbred racehorse

Curren Chan カレンチャン
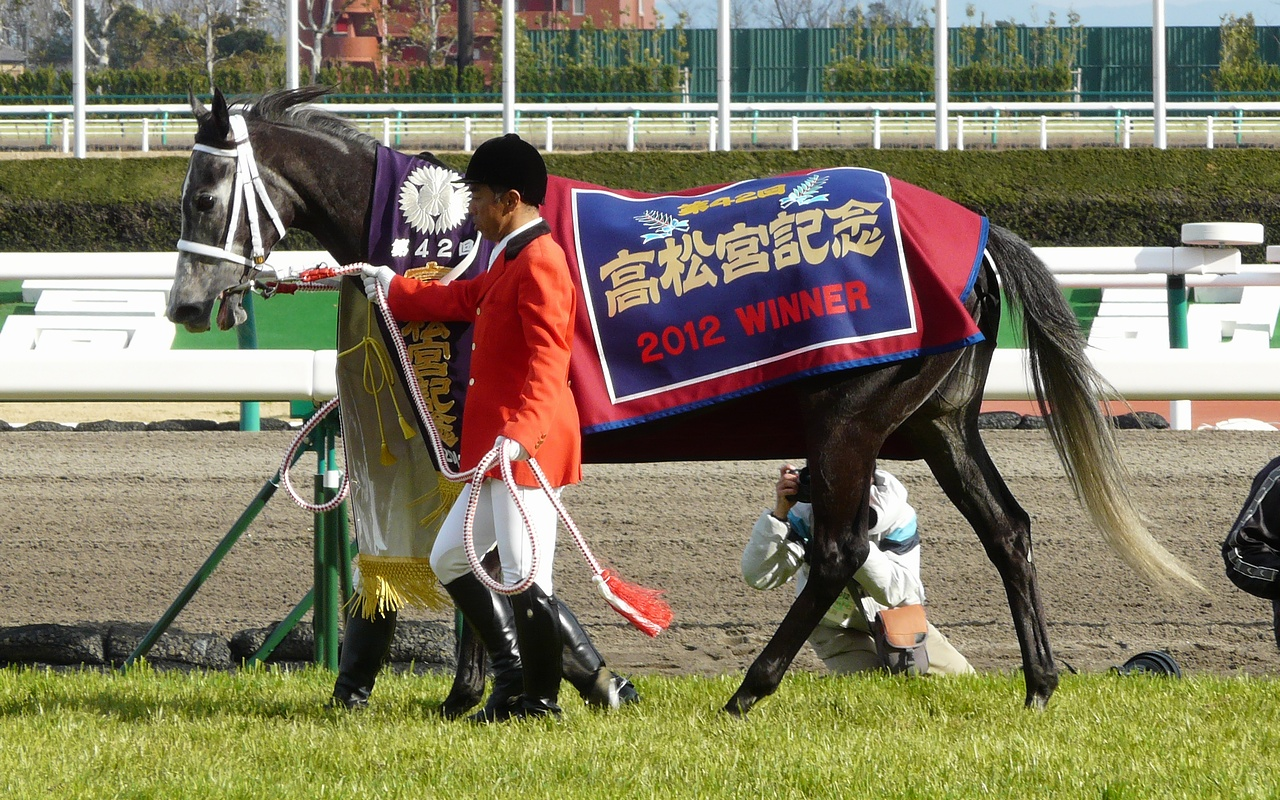
- Curren Chan in March 2012.
- Breed: Thoroughbred
- Sire: Kurofune
- Grandsire: French Deputy
- Dam: Spring Ticket
- Damsire: Tony Bin
- Sex: Mare
- Foaled: March 31, 2007 (age 19)
- Country: Japan
- Colour: Grey
- Breeder: Shadai Farm
- Owner: Takashi Suzuki
- Racing colours
- Trainer: Takayuki Yasuda
- Jockey: Kenichi Ikezoe
- Record: 18:9-3-1
- Earnings: ¥449,061,000

Major wins
- Hanshin Himba Stakes (2011); Hakodate Sprint Stakes (2011); Keeneland Cup (2011); Sprinters Stakes (2011); Takamatsunomiya Kinen (2012)

Awards
- JRA Award for Best Sprinter or Miler (2011); JRA Award for Best Older Filly or Mare (2012)

Curren Chan (Japanese: カレンチャン, Hepburn: Karen Chan; foaled 31 March 2007) is a retired Japanese Thoroughbred racehorse and broodmare who won two JRA Awards. After finishing second on her only start as a juvenile she won three minor races from five starts as a three-year-old in 2010. She emerged as a top-class sprinter in 2011 when she won five consecutive races including the Hanshin Himba Stakes, Hakodate Sprint Stakes, Keeneland Cup and the Sprinters Stakes and won the JRA Award for Best Sprinter or Miler. In 2012 she was overshadowed by her younger stablemate Lord Kanaloa, but won the Takamatsunomiya Kinen and took the JRA Award for Best Older Filly or Mare.

== Background ==
Curren Chan is a grey mare bred in Japan by Shadai Farms. She was sired by Kurofune, an American-bred stallion who won the NHK Mile Cup and the Japan Cup Dirt in 2001. As a breeding stallion, his other progeny have included Clarity Sky (NHK Mile Cup), Sleepless Night (Sprinters Stakes), Fusaichi Richard (Asahi Hai Futurity Stakes) and Whale Capture (Victoria Mile). Curren Chan's dam Spring Ticket was a successful racemare who won six of her nineteen races between 2000 and 2002. She was a female-line descendant of Falkar, an American broodmare who was imported to Japan in 1953.

As a foal in 2007 the filly was consigned to the Japanese Select Sale and was bought for 26,250,000 yen by Takashi Suzuki. She was trained throughout her racing career by Takayuki Yasuda and was ridden in most of her races by Kenichi Ikezoe.

== Racing career ==
=== 2009–2010: early career ===
On her only appearance as a two-year-old, Curren Chan contested an event for previously unraced horses over 1200 metres on dirt at Hanshin Racecourse on 26 December and finished second of the twelve runners behind the colt Takano King.

On her first appearance as a three-year-old Curren Chan won a maiden race over 1200 metres on dirt at Kyoto Racecourse in January and followed up the following month with her first victory on turf when she won the Moegi Sho over the same distance at Chukyo Racecourse. She was then moved up in class and distance for the Grade II Fillies' Revue over 1400 metres at Hanshin and finished eighth of the sixteen runners, three lengths behind the winner Sound Barrier. In her two remaining races that year, the filly was brought back in distance to 1200 metres. She finished second to Keiai Daisy in the Listed Aoi Stakes at Kyoto in May and then won at Hakodate Racecourse in June.

=== 2011: four-year-old season ===
Curren Chan began her third season at Kyoto, finishing third to Orion Stars and Ken Bridge L in the Fushimi Stakes and then winning the Yamashiro Stakes on 19 February. On 9 April the filly was moved back up to Grade II level and started 3.2/1 favourite against seventeen opponents in the Hanshin Himba Stakes over 1400 metres at Hanshin. She won the race by half a length from En Ciel Bleu with Spring Thunder another half length away in third. On 3 July Curren Chan took on male opposition in the Grade III Hakodate Sprint Stakes over 1200 metres. She started the 1.7/1 favourite and won by a neck from the three-year-old colt T M Otaka.

On 28 August Curren Chan began her autumn campaign in the Grade III Keeneland Cup over 1200 metres at Sapporo Racecourse and started the odds-on favourite in a sixteen-runner field. She recorded her fourth consecutive victory as she won by a neck and a nose from B B Guldan and Pas de Trois. Curren Chan was moved up to Grade I level for the first time in the Sprinters Stakes over 1200 metres at Nakayama Racecourse on 2 October. The Singapore champion Rocket Man started odds-on favourite ahead of Dasher Go Go who had finished second in the race in 2010, with Curren Chan the 10.2/1 third choice in the betting. The other fancied runners included the Hong Kong challenger Lucky Nine, San Carlo (New Zealand Trophy), Fifth Petal and A Shin Virgo (Centaur Stakes). Curren Chan recorded her most important success as she won by one and three-quarter lengths and a nose from Pas de Trois and A Shin Virgo.

On her final appearance of the season, Curren Chan was sent to Hong Kong for the Hong Kong Sprint at Sha Tin Racecourse in December. She proved the best of the overseas runners but was beaten into fifth behind the locally trained runners Lucky Nine, Joy And Fun, Entrapment and Little Bridge.

In January 2012, at the JRA Awards Curren Chan was named Japan's champion sprinter or miler for the 2011 season taking 270 of the 285 votes. She also finished runner-up behind Buena Vista in the voting for the JRA Award for Best Older Filly or Mare.

=== 2012: five-year-old season ===
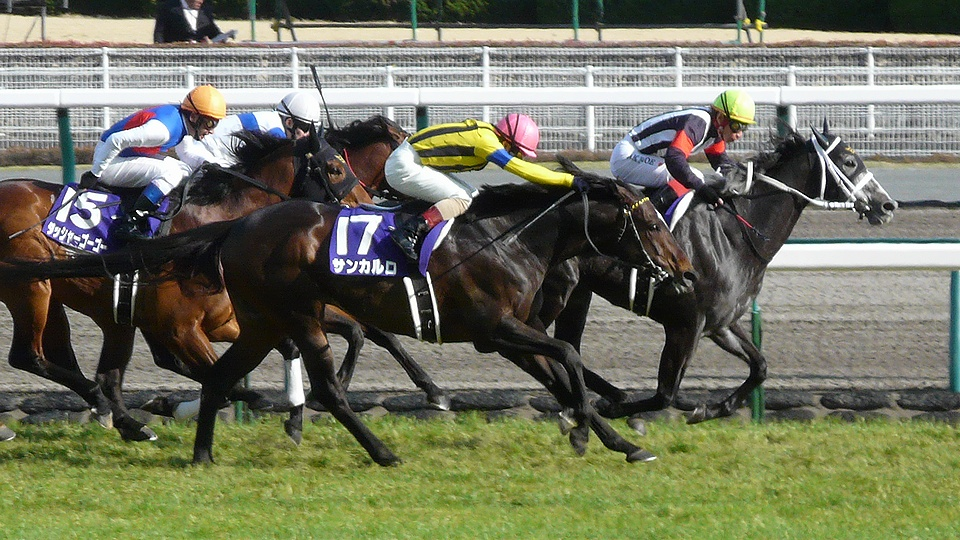
Curren Chan wins the Takamatsunomiya Kinen

On her first run in 2012 Curren Chan started favourite for the Grade III Ocean Stakes over 1200 metres at Nakayama on 3 March and finished fourth behind the outsiders One Carat, Grand Prix Angel and Bering Boy. Three weeks later the mare stepped back up to Grade I level for the Takamatsunomiya Kinen at Chukyo Racecourse and started the 2.9/1 second favourite behind the four-year-old colt Lord Kanaloa also trained by Takayuki Yasuda. The other runners included San Carlo, Dasher Go Go, Grand Prix Angel, Bering Boy, Jo Cappuccino (NHK Mile Cup) and Majin Prosper (twice winner of the CBC Sho over the course and distance). Curren Chan took the lead on the turn into the straight and recorded her second Grade I victory as she held off several challengers to win by a neck and half a length from San Carlo and Lord Kanaloa.

After a break of over five months, Curren Chan returned in the Grade II Centaur Stakes at Hanshin on 9 September and finished fourth behind Epice Arome, Lord Kanaloa and En Ciel Bleu. Three weeks later the mare attempted to repeat her 2011 success in the Sprinters Stakes and started the 6/4 favourite in a sixteen-runner field. Curren Chan raced in mid-division before taking the lead inside the last 200 metres but was overtaken and beaten three quarters of the length into second by Lord Kanaloa. On her final racecourse appearance Curren Chan ran for the second time in the Hong Kong Sprint and finished seventh of the twelve runners behind Lord Kanaloa.

In the JRA Awards for 2012 Curren Chan won the JRA Award for Best Older Filly or Mare, taking 177 of the 289 votes. She also finished runner-up to Lord Kanaloa in the voting for champion sprinter or miler.

== Breeding career ==
Following her retirement, Curren Chan became a broodmare. She had produced six foals, including Curren Moe who placed second in three Grade 3 races, namely the Keihan Hai in 2020, the Ocean Stakes and the Hakodate Sprint Stakes in 2021.

Curren Chan had several miscarriages after breeding with Deep Impact, Duramente, and Sungrazer, as well as two failed attempts with Just A Way.

Shortly after delivering her last offspring in 2024, Curren Chan retired from breeding to spend the rest of her life at Shadai Farm.

c = colt, f = filly

No.	Name	Foaled	Sex	Color	Sire	Wins	Races	Remarks
	(not foaled)	2014			Deep Impact			
1st	Curren Slay	2015	c	Gray	Novellist	6	15	Retired
2nd	Curren Moe	2016	f	Gray	Lord Kanaloa	4	13	Retired, broodmare
3rd	Curren Hime	2017	f	Gray	Danon Chantilly	2	14	Retired, broodmare
4th	Curren Yuan Meng	2018	c	Chestnut	Curren Black Hill	0	2	Retired, riding horse
5th	Curren Emotion	2019	c	Gray	Heart's Cry	0	3	Retired, riding horse
	(not foaled)	2020			Just A Way			
	(not foaled)	2021			Just A Way			
	(not foaled)	2022			Duramente			
	(not foaled)	2023			Sungrazer			
6th	(Curren Chan 2024)	2024	f	Brown	Reach the Crown			

== In popular culture ==
An anthropomorphized version of Curren Chan appears as a character in the Japanese multimedia franchise Umamusume: Pretty Derby, voiced by Yū Sasahara. She is depicted as an influencer who markets her "cuteness" on social media, but admits that she is nowhere near as innocent as she presents herself, displaying traits such as being deceptively flirtatious, having manipulative tendencies, and a fondness for horror media. She is a playable character in the mobile game and appears in the ONA series Umamusume: Pretty Derby – Road to the Top as the roommate of Admire Vega, one of the main characters.

== Racing form ==
Curren Chan won nine races, placed in four races out of 18 starts. This data is available on JBIS, netkeiba and HKJC.

Date	Age	Track	Race	Grade	Distance (Condition)	Entry	HN	Odds (Favored)	Finish	Time	Margins	Jockey	Winner (Runner-up)
Dec 26, 2009	2	Hanshin	2yo Newcomer		1,200 m (Fast)	12	1	1.6 (1)	2nd	1:14.3	0.2	Yutaka Take	Takano King
Jan 16, 2010	3	Kyoto	3yo Maiden		1,200 m (Fast)	16	16	1.5 (1)	1st	1:13.1	–0.2	Kyosuke Kokubun	(Pretty Star)
Feb 7, 2010	3	Chukyo	Moegi Sho	ALW (1W)	1,200 m (Firm)	18	14	5.1 (2)	1st	1:09.7	–0.2	Ryota Sameshima	(Jody's Line)
Mar 14, 2010	3	Hanshin	Fillies' Revue	2	1,400 m (Firm)	16	7	13.8 (6)	8th	1:23.2	0.4	Ryota Sameshima	Sound Barrier
May 15, 2010	3	Kyoto	Aoi Stakes	OP	1,200 m (Firm)	16	7	4.5 (2)	2nd	1:07.6	0.0	Kenichi Ikezoe	Keiai Daisy
Jun 19, 2010	3	Hakodate	Shiosai Tokubetsu	ALW (2W)	1,200 m (Firm)	9	1	2.8 (2)	1st	1:08.8	–0.4	Kenichi Ikezoe	(Sakura Idaten)
Jan 23, 2011	4	Kyoto	Fushimi Stakes	ALW (3W)	1,200 m (Firm)	15	7	2.9 (1)	3rd	1:09.3	0.5	Kenichi Ikezoe	Orion Stars
Feb 19, 2011	4	Kyoto	Yamashiro Stakes	ALW (3W)	1,200 m (Good)	15	2	1.9 (1)	1st	1:09.2	–0.4	Yuga Kawada	(Dream Valentino)
Apr 9, 2011	4	Hanshin	Hanshin Himba Stakes	2	1,400 m (Firm)	18	1	4.2 (1)	1st	1:20.4	–0.1	Kenichi Ikezoe	(En Ciel Bleu)
Jul 3, 2011	4	Hakodate	Hakodate Sprint Stakes	3	1,200 m (Firm)	12	2	2.7 (1)	1st	1:08.0	0.0	Kenichi Ikezoe	(T M Otaka)
Aug 28, 2011	4	Sapporo	Keeneland Cup	3	1,200 m (Firm)	16	8	1.9 (1)	1st	1:08.6	0.0	Kenichi Ikezoe	(B B Guldan)
Oct 11, 2011	4	Nakayama	Sprinters Stakes	1	1,200 m (Firm)	15	10	11.2 (3)	1st	1:07.4	–0.3	Kenichi Ikezoe	(Pas de Trois)
Dec 11, 2011	4	Sha Tin	Hong Kong Sprint	1	1,200 m (Firm)	14	14	10.0 (5)	5th	1:09.4	0.4	Kenichi Ikezoe	Lucky Nine
Mar 3, 2012	5	Nakayama	Ocean Stakes	3	1,200 m (Soft)	16	13	2.4 (1)	4th	1:09.4	0.2	Kenichi Ikezoe	One Carat
Mar 25, 2012	5	Chukyo	Takamatsunomiya Kinen	1	1,200 m (Firm)	18	10	3.9 (2)	1st	1:10.3	0.0	Kenichi Ikezoe	(San Carlo)
Sep 9, 2012	5	Hanshin	Centaur Stakes	2	1,200 m (Firm)	16	6	5.0 (3)	4th	1:07.4	0.1	Kenichi Ikezoe	Epice Arome
Sep 30, 2012	5	Nakayama	Sprinters Stakes	1	1,200 m (Firm)	16	14	2.5 (1)	2nd	1:06.8	0.1	Kenichi Ikezoe	Lord Kanaloa
Dec 9, 2012	5	Sha Tin	Hong Kong Sprint	1	1,200 m (Good)	12	12	26.0 (7)	7th	1:09.2	0.7	Kenichi Ikezoe	Lord Kanaloa

Legend:
Turf Dirt

== Pedigree ==
Pedigree of Curren Chan (JPN), grey mare, 2007
Sire Kurofune (USA) 1998	French Deputy (USA); 1992	Deputy Minister (CAN)	Vice Regent (CAN)
Sire Kurofune (USA) 1998	French Deputy (USA); 1992	Deputy Minister (CAN)	Mint Copy (CAN)
Sire Kurofune (USA) 1998	French Deputy (USA); 1992	Mitterand (USA)	Hold Your Peace (USA)
Sire Kurofune (USA) 1998	French Deputy (USA); 1992	Mitterand (USA)	Laredo Lass (USA)
Sire Kurofune (USA) 1998	Blue Avenue (USA); 1990	Classic Go Go (USA)	Pago Pago (AUS)
Sire Kurofune (USA) 1998	Blue Avenue (USA); 1990	Classic Go Go (USA)	Classic Perfection (USA)
Sire Kurofune (USA) 1998	Blue Avenue (USA); 1990	Eliza Blue (USA)	Icecapade (USA)
Sire Kurofune (USA) 1998	Blue Avenue (USA); 1990	Eliza Blue (USA)	Corella (USA)
Dam Spring Ticket (JPN) 1997	Tony Bin (IRE); 1983	Kampala (GB)	Kalamoun (GB)
Dam Spring Ticket (JPN) 1997	Tony Bin (IRE); 1983	Kampala (GB)	State Pension (GB)
Dam Spring Ticket (JPN) 1997	Tony Bin (IRE); 1983	Severn Bridge (GB)	Hornbeam (GB)
Dam Spring Ticket (JPN) 1997	Tony Bin (IRE); 1983	Severn Bridge (GB)	Priddy Fair (GB)
Dam Spring Ticket (JPN) 1997	Kazumi Harukoma (JPN); 1984	Maruzensky (JPN)	Nijinsky (CAN)
Dam Spring Ticket (JPN) 1997	Kazumi Harukoma (JPN); 1984	Maruzensky (JPN)	Shill (USA)
Dam Spring Ticket (JPN) 1997	Kazumi Harukoma (JPN); 1984	Senshu Takara (JPN)	Venture (GB)
Dam Spring Ticket (JPN) 1997	Kazumi Harukoma (JPN); 1984	Senshu Takara (JPN)	Shadai Wing (JPN) (Family:13-c)
