= Calstone Light O =

Japanese Thoroughbred racehorse (1998–2024)

Calstone Light O カルストンライトオ
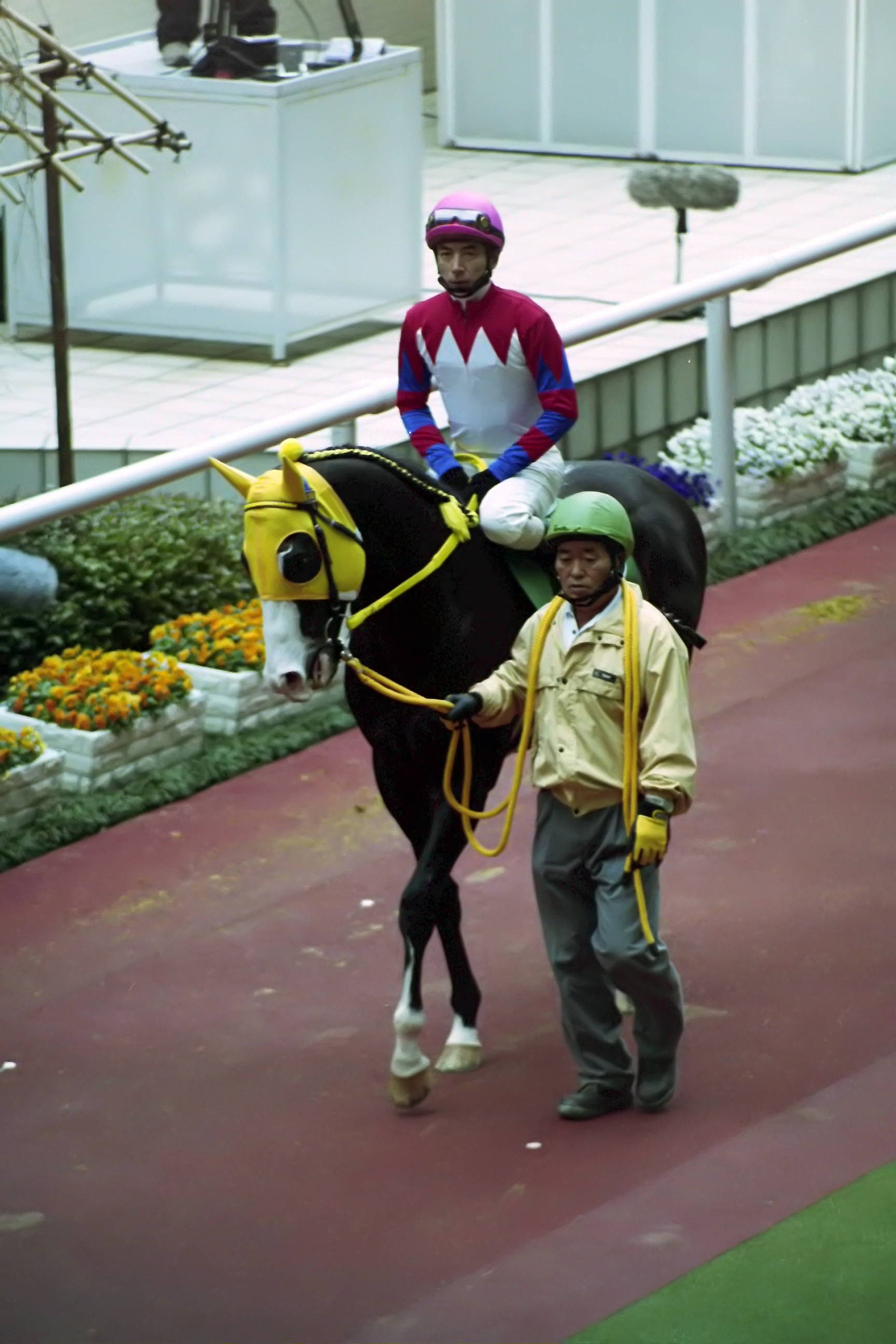
- Calstone Light O at the paddock of the 2005 Hankyu Hai.
- Breed: Thoroughbred
- Sire: Warning (GB)
- Grandsire: Known Fact (USA)
- Dam: Oshima Lucia (JPN)
- Damsire: Crystal Glitters (USA)
- Sex: Stallion
- Foaled: May 3, 1998
- Died: February 7, 2024 (aged 25)
- Country: Japan
- Colour: Seal brown
- Breeder: Oshima Bokujo
- Owner: Sadamitsu Shimizu
- Racing colours
- Trainer: Yuya Ooneda; Hiroyuki Ooneda
- Jockey: Naohiro Onishi; Shigefumi Kumazawa; Takao Koike
- Record: 36: 9-4-7
- Earnings: ¥422,044,000

Major wins
- Ibis Summer Dash (2002, 2004); Sprinters Stakes (2004)

Calstone Light O (Japanese: カルストンライトオ, Hepburn: Karusuton Raito O; 3 May 1998 – 7 February 2024) was a Japanese Thoroughbred racehorse and sire. He competed from 2000 to 2005, recording nine wins in thirty-six starts, including the Sprinters Stakes in 2004 and the Ibis Summer Dash in 2002 and 2004.

== Background ==
Calstone Light O was a dark bay horse with a white blaze and a white sock on his right hind leg bred in Urakawa, Hokkaido by Oshima Bokujo. He was sired by Warning, the top-rated European racehorse in 1988 who stood as a breeding stallion in Europe before being exported to Japan. His other best progeny included Piccolo, Diktat (Prix Maurice de Gheest, Haydock Sprint Cup), Charnwood Forest (Queen Anne Stakes), and Annus Mirabilis (Dubai Duty Free). Calstone Light O's dam was Oshima Lucia, a daughter of Crystal Glitters who won 4 of her 18 starts.

In 1999, he was offered at the Hokkaido Summer Sale and purchased for ¥18.9 million by Sadamitsu Shimizu. The name "Calstone" was derived from Shimizu's business dealing in pumice (light stone), combined with "Light" and "O" (from the owner's name, Sadamitsu, and "King"). He was sent into training with Yuya Ooneda at the JRA's Ritto Training Center, and later transferred to the stable of Hiroyuki Ooneda.

== Racing career ==
=== 2000: Two-year-old season ===
Calstone Light O debuted on November 5, 2000, in a maiden race on the turf at Kyoto Racecourse, winning by a margin of 0.7 seconds. He followed this with a victory in the Kaede Sho (500 Win Allowance) later that month. He concluded his two-year-old season by finishing tenth in the Asahi Hai Sansai Stakes (GI).

=== 2001: Three-year-old season ===
In 2001, Calstone Light O competed primarily in sprint stakes races. He won the Aoi Stakes (OP) in May. He finished third in the Falcon Stakes (GIII), the Ibis Summer Dash (GIII), and the Centaur Stakes (GIII). He also placed second in the Fukushima Minyu Cup (OP) and the Margaret Stakes (OP).

=== 2002: Four-year-old season ===
Calstone Light O secured his first graded stakes victory in the Ibis Summer Dash (GIII) at Niigata Racecourse in August 2002. Ridden by Naohiro Onishi, he won the 1000-meter straight turf race in a time of 0:53.7, setting a new course record. He subsequently finished third in the Centaur Stakes (GIII) and the Fukushima Minpo Hai (OP).

=== 2003: Five-year-old season ===
During the 2003 season, Calstone Light O struggled in graded stakes company, finishing unplaced in the Sprinters Stakes (GI) and the CBC Sho (GII). He recorded his only victory of the year in the Andromeda Stakes (OP) at Kyoto in November.

=== 2004: Six-year-old season ===
Calstone Light O won his second Ibis Summer Dash (GIII) in August 2004. On October 3, he contested the Sprinters Stakes (GI) at Nakayama Racecourse. Starting as the fifth favorite on a sloppy track, he took the early lead and maintained his advantage in the final strides, winning by a margin of 0.7 seconds over Durandal.

In December, he traveled to Hong Kong to compete in the Hong Kong Sprint (GI) at Sha Tin Racecourse, where he finished fourteenth behind Silent Witness.

=== 2005: Seven-year-old season ===
In his final racing season, Calstone Light O finished second in the Hankyu Hai (GIII) and fourth in the Takamatsunomiya Kinen (GI). He ran fourth in his third attempt at the Ibis Summer Dash and tenth in the Sprinters Stakes. Following the Sprinters Stakes, it was announced that he had developed inflammation in his right foreleg. He was officially retired from racing on November 2, 2005.

== Stud career ==
Following his retirement, Calstone Light O stood at Lex Stud in Shizunai, Hokkaido, beginning in 2006. He later moved to Hashimoto Bokujo in Abira, and subsequently to Nissei Bokujo in Hidaka. He sired several winners in regional NAR competition, including Brave Call (winner of the Hyogo Derby) and Tulipa (winner of the Hyogo Wakagoma Sho and Nojigiku Sho). He was noted as one of the few active stallions in Japan that is a descendant of the Godolphin Arabian.

Calstone Light O died of old age on February 7, 2024, at Nissei Bokujo at the age of 25.

== In popular culture ==
An anthropomorphized version of Calstone Light O appears as a character in the Japanese multimedia franchise Umamusume: Pretty Derby, voiced by Yumiko Mochizuki. She is depicted as a straight-faced girl with a strange obsession with speed and straight lines that extends outside the racetrack, as well as being excessively honest and open about her feelings. She is single-minded, prefers completing tasks as quickly and efficiently as possible, and has a strong dislike for curves, which she regularly attempts to remove from her daily life.

== Statistics ==
The following table details all 36 starts of Calstone Light O's racing career based on official netkeiba and JBIS records.

Date	Distance (Condition)	Race	Class	Course	Odds (Favourite)	Field	Finish	Time	Winning (Losing) Margin	Winner (2nd Place)	Jockey	Ref
2000 – two-year-old season
Nov 5	Turf 1200 m (Good)	3-Y-O Newcomer	Maiden	Kyoto	5.2 (3rd)	13	1st	1:09.5	–0.7	(Capital Luck)	Takao Koike	
Nov 25	Turf 1200 m (Good)	Kaede Sho	Allowance	Kyoto	3.6 (2nd)	11	1st	1:08.9	–1.0	(Rugger Pageant)	Shigefumi Kumazawa	
Dec 10	Turf 1600 m (Good)	Asahi Hai Sansai Stakes	GI	Nakayama	26.5 (8th)	16	10th	1:35.7	1.2	Mejiro Bailey	Takao Koike	
2001 – three-year-old season
Jan 28	Dirt 1400 m (Heavy)	Violet Stakes	Open	Kyoto	3.3 (1st)	13	10th	1:26.4	1.7	Meiner Ehre	Shigefumi Kumazawa	
Apr 1	Turf 1400 m (Good)	Margaret Stakes	Open	Hanshin	8.8 (5th)	14	2nd	1:21.2	0.1	Stima	Shigefumi Kumazawa	
May 12	Turf 1200 m (Good)	Aoi Stakes	Open	Kyoto	2.0 (1st)	16	1st	1:07.4	–0.1	(Resurreccion)	Shigefumi Kumazawa	
Jun 10	Turf 1200 m (Good)	Falcon Stakes	GIII	Chukyo	2.7 (1st)	17	3rd	1:09.1	0.2	Rusunai Christie	Shigefumi Kumazawa	
Jul 8	Turf 1600 m (Good)	Bodaiju Stakes	Open	Hanshin	6.5 (5th)	11	4th	1:34.5	0.9	Meisho Ramses	Shigefumi Kumazawa	
Jul 22	Turf 1200 m (Good)	Kitakyushu Tankyori S	Open	Kokura	3.5 (3rd)	10	1st	1:07.9	–0.1	(Nobori Yukio)	Shigefumi Kumazawa	
Aug 19	Turf 1000 m (Good)	Ibis Summer Dash	GIII	Niigata	3.0 (1st)	12	3rd	0:54.2	0.3	Mejiro Darling	Shigefumi Kumazawa	
Sep 9	Turf 1200 m (Good)	Centaur Stakes	GIII	Hanshin	3.0 (1st)	13	3rd	1:08.2	0.1	Tennessee Girl	Shigefumi Kumazawa	
Oct 28	Turf 1200 m (Good)	Fukushima Minyu Cup	Open	Fukushima	3.6 (1st)	14	2nd	1:08.5	0.4	Yuwa Falcon	Junichi Serizawa	
Nov 25	Turf 1200 m (Good)	Andromeda Stakes	Open	Kyoto	2.5 (1st)	11	6th	1:08.4	0.3	Tenshino Kiseki	Hiroshi Kawachi	
Dec 15	Turf 1200 m (Good)	CBC Sho	GII	Chukyo	4.9 (2nd)	15	9th	1:10.2	1.1	Rikiai Taikan	Hiroshi Kawachi	
2002 – four-year-old season
Jun 8	Turf 1200 m (Good)	TV Aichi Open	Open	Chukyo	40.9 (10th)	18	13th	1:09.9	1.3	Native Heart	Koshiro Take	
Jun 29	Turf 1200 m (Good)	TUF Hai	Allowance	Fukushima	4.1 (1st)	16	1st	1:08.4	–0.4	(Tenzan Desert)	Naohiro Onishi	
Jul 14	Turf 1400 m (Good)	NST Open	Open	Niigata	14.1 (5th)	18	7th	1:19.6	0.6	Magnaten	Naohiro Onishi	
Aug 4	Turf 1200 m (Good)	Kokura Nikkei Open	Open	Kokura	1.5 (1st)	11	3rd	1:08.3	0.2	Tenshino Kiseki	Shigefumi Kumazawa	
Aug 18	Turf 1000 m (Good)	Ibis Summer Dash	GIII	Niigata	2.6 (2nd)	13	1st	R0:53.7	–0.3	(Breaktime)	Naohiro Onishi	
Sep 8	Turf 1200 m (Good)	Centaur Stakes	GIII	Hanshin	5.8 (2nd)	12	3rd	1:07.8	0.7	Believe	Naohiro Onishi	
Oct 6	Turf 1200 m (Good)	Fukushima Minpo Hai	Open	Fukushima	3.0 (1st)	16	3rd	1:08.3	0.1	Star El Dorado	Naohiro Onishi	
Oct 26	Turf 1400 m (Good)	Swan Stakes	GII	Kyoto	62.8 (11th)	18	13th	1:21.9	2.1	Shonan Kampf	Shigefumi Kumazawa	
2003 – five-year-old season
Sep 14	Turf 1200 m (Good)	Centaur Stakes	GIII	Hanshin	64.9 (7th)	13	12th	1:09.4	1.6	Tenshino Kiseki	Koshiro Take	
Oct 5	Turf 1200 m (Good)	Sprinters Stakes	GI	Nakayama	76.9 (11th)	15	13th	1:09.6	1.6	Durandal	Ichiyo Murata	
Oct 26	Turf 1200 m (Good)	Fukushima Minyu Cup	Open	Fukushima	5.7 (3rd)	16	5th	1:07.6	0.2	Atago Taisho	Naohiro Onishi	
Nov 30	Turf 1200 m (Heavy)	Andromeda Stakes	Open	Kyoto	8.6 (5th)	12	1st	1:10.3	–0.2	(She is Tosho)	Takao Koike	
Dec 21	Turf 1200 m (Good)	CBC Sho	GII	Chukyo	14.9 (5th)	16	10th	1:09.5	1.0	She is Tosho	Takao Koike	
2004 – six-year-old season
Jun 20	Turf 1200 m (Good)	Baden Baden Cup	Open	Fukushima	10.7 (5th)	16	2nd	1:07.3	0.0	Wonder Seattle	Naohiro Onishi	
Jul 4	Turf 1200 m (Good)	Hakodate Sprint Stakes	GIII	Hakodate	9.8 (5th)	15	3rd	1:09.7	0.3	She is Tosho	Junichi Serizawa	
Aug 22	Turf 1000 m (Good)	Ibis Summer Dash	GIII	Niigata	2.2 (1st)	12	1st	0:53.9	–0.5	(Takao Ruby)	Naohiro Onishi	
Oct 3	Turf 1200 m (Sloppy)	Sprinters Stakes	GI	Nakayama	8.5 (5th)	16	1st	1:09.9	–0.7	(Durandal)	Naohiro Onishi	
Dec 12	Turf 1000 m (Good)	Hong Kong Sprint	GI	Sha Tin	5.5 (2nd)	14	14th	1:00.1	3.3	Silent Witness	Naohiro Onishi	
2005 – seven-year-old season
Feb 27	Turf 1200 m (Good)	Hankyu Hai	GIII	Hanshin	5.7 (3rd)	16	2nd	1:08.5	0.0	Keeneland Swan	Naohiro Onishi	
Mar 27	Turf 1200 m (Good)	Takamatsunomiya Kinen	GI	Chukyo	7.1 (3rd)	18	4th	1:08.9	0.5	Admire Max	Naohiro Onishi	
Aug 21	Turf 1000 m (Good)	Ibis Summer Dash	GIII	Niigata	1.8 (1st)	13	4th	0:54.5	0.5	T M Churasan	Naohiro Onishi	
Oct 2	Turf 1200 m (Good)	Sprinters Stakes	GI	Nakayama	26.3 (8th)	16	10th	1:08.0	0.7	Silent Witness	Naohiro Onishi	

== Pedigree ==
Pedigree of Calstone Light O (JPN), Dark Bay Stallion, 1998
Sire Warning (GB) 1985	Known Fact (USA); 1977	In Reality	Intentionally
Sire Warning (GB) 1985	Known Fact (USA); 1977	In Reality	My Dear Girl
Sire Warning (GB) 1985	Known Fact (USA); 1977	Tamerett	Tim Tam
Sire Warning (GB) 1985	Known Fact (USA); 1977	Tamerett	Mixed Marriage
Sire Warning (GB) 1985	Slightly Dangerous (USA); 1979	Roberto	Hail to Reason
Sire Warning (GB) 1985	Slightly Dangerous (USA); 1979	Roberto	Bramalea
Sire Warning (GB) 1985	Slightly Dangerous (USA); 1979	Where You Lead	Raise a Native
Sire Warning (GB) 1985	Slightly Dangerous (USA); 1979	Where You Lead	Noblesse
Dam Oshima Lucia (JPN) 1990	Crystal Glitters (USA); 1980	Blushing Groom (FR); 1974	Red God
Dam Oshima Lucia (JPN) 1990	Crystal Glitters (USA); 1980	Blushing Groom (FR); 1974	Runaway Bride
Dam Oshima Lucia (JPN) 1990	Crystal Glitters (USA); 1980	Tales to Tell (USA); 1967	Donut King
Dam Oshima Lucia (JPN) 1990	Crystal Glitters (USA); 1980	Tales to Tell (USA); 1967	Fleeting Doll
Dam Oshima Lucia (JPN) 1990	Oshima Suzuran (JPN); 1978	Kauai King (USA); 1963	Native Dancer (1950)
Dam Oshima Lucia (JPN) 1990	Oshima Suzuran (JPN); 1978	Kauai King (USA); 1963	Sweep In
Dam Oshima Lucia (JPN) 1990	Oshima Suzuran (JPN); 1978	Never Jo O (JPN); 1969	Never Beat
Dam Oshima Lucia (JPN) 1990	Oshima Suzuran (JPN); 1978	Never Jo O (JPN); 1969	Gunshin (1959) (Family 10-b)

== See also ==
- Thoroughbred racing in Japan
- Sprinters Stakes
