= Ibis Summer Dash =

Ibis Summer Dash アイビスサマーダッシュ
- 2023 Ibis Summer Dash winner All at Once
- Class: Grade 3
- Location: Niigata Racecourse
- Inaugurated: 2001
- Race type: Thoroughbred Flat racing

Race information
- Distance: 1000 meters
- Surface: Turf
- Track: Straight
- Qualification: 3-y-o+
- Weight: Special Weight
- Purse: ¥ 87,960,000 (as of 2024): 1st: ¥ 41,000,000; 2nd: ¥ 16,000,000; 3rd: ¥ 10,000,000

The Ibis Summer Dash (Japanese アイビスサマーダッシュ) is a Grade 3 horse race in Japan for Thoroughbreds aged three and over. It is run in July each year over a distance of 1000 meters on turf at Niigata Racecourse.

The race was first run in 2001 and has held Grade 3 status ever since. Since its creation, it is the only Graded Race in Japan with an exclusively straight-line course.

It was also a step race for the Sprinters Stakes until 2005 but lost that status since then.

== Weight ==
K T Love, winner of the 2010 Ibis Summer Dush

54 kg for three-year-old, 57 kg for four-year-old and above.

Allowances:

- 2 kg for fillies / mares
- 1 kg for southern hemisphere bred three-year-old

Penalties (excluding two-year-old race performance):

- If a graded stakes race has been won within a year:
  - 3 kg for a grade 1 win (2 kg for fillies / mares)
  - 2 kg for a grade 2 win (1 kg for fillies / mares)
  - 1 kg for a grade 3 win (1 kg for fillies / mares)
- If a graded stakes race has been won for more than a year:
  - 2 kg for a grade 1 win (1 kg for fillies / mares)
  - 1 kg for a grade 2 win

== Winners since 2001 ==
Year	Winner	Age	Jockey	Trainer	Owner	Time
2001	Mejiro Darling	5	Yutaka Yoshida	Yokichi Okubo	Mejiro Bokujo	0:53.9
2002	Calstone Light O	4	Naohiro Onishi	Hiroyuki Oneda	Sadamitsu Shimizu	0:53.7
2003	Il Bacio	6	Seiji Shimohama	Satoru Kobiyama	Sakae Shibahara	0:54.2
2004	Calstone Light O	6	Naohiro Onishi	Hiroyuki Oneda	Sadamitsu Shimizu	0:53.9
2005	T M Churasan	3	Sho Tajima	Sadahiro Kojima	Masatsugu Takezono	0:54.0
2006	Sachino Sweetie	3	Naoto Suzuki	Yuji Hirai	Yukihiko Sato	0:55.7
2007	Sans Adieu	5	Issei Murata	Hidetaka Otonashi	Takao Matsuoka	0:55.1
2008	Kanoya Zakura	4	Futoshi Komaki	Kojiro Hashiguchi	Kaoru Kanda	0:54.2
2009	Kanoya Zakura	5	Futoshi Komaki	Kojiro Hashiguchi	Kaoru Kanda	0:56.2
2010	K T Love	6	Yuichiro Nishida	Akira Nomoto	Kazuyoshi Takimoto	0:53.9
2011	A Shin Virgo	4	Yuichi Fukunaga	Ken Kozaki	Eishindo	0:53.8
2012	Pas de Trois	5	Katsumi Ando	Ippo Sameshima	Teruya Yoshida	0:54.2
2013	Hakusan Moon	4	Manabu Sakai	Masato Nishizono	Goichi Kawasaki	0:54.2
2014	Seiko Raiko	7	Yoshitomi Shibata	Yasuhiro Suzuki	Mieko Takekuni	0:54.3
2015	Bel Canto	4	Mirco Demuro	Koichi Tsunoda	Koji Maeda	0:54.1
2016	Bel Canto	5	Mirco Demuro	Koichi Tsunoda	Koji Maeda	0:54.1
2017	Rhein Meteor	7	Yuichiro Nishida	Takahiro Mizuno	Shigemasa Osawa	0:54.2
2018	Daimei Princess	5	Shinichiro Akiyama	Naoyuki Morita	Koichi Miyamoto	0:53.8
2019	Lion Boss	4	Hironobu Tanabe	Shoichiro Wada	Wada Bokujo	0:55.1
2020	Jo Kana Chan	5	Yuji Hishida	Takeshi Matsushita	Eriko Ueda	0:54.5
2021	All At Once	3	Yukito Ishikawa	Eiji Nakadate	Katsumi Yoshida	0:54.2
2022	Believer	7	Makoto Sugihara	Yoshihiko Ishige	Milfarm	0:54.4
2023	All At Once	5	Yukito Ishikawa	Eiji Nakadate	Katsumi Yoshida	0:54.9
2024	Mozu Meimei	4	Kyosuke Kokubun	Hidetaka Otonashi	Capital System	0:55.3
2025	Puro Magic	4	Christophe Lemaire	Shogo Yasuda	Three H Racing	0:53.7
2026	Puro Magic	5	Hironobu Tanabe	Shogo Yasuda	Three H Racing	0:53.5

== See also ==
- Horse racing in Japan
- List of Japanese flat horse races
