= Leopard Stakes =

Leopard Stakes レパードステークス
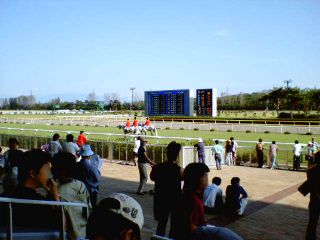
- Niigata Racecourse
- Class: Grade 3
- Location: Niigata Racecourse
- Inaugurated: 2009
- Race type: Thoroughbred Flat racing

Race information
- Distance: 1800 metres
- Surface: Dirt
- Track: Left-handed
- Qualification: 3-y-o
- Weight: 57 kg Allowance: Fillies 2 kg
- Purse: ¥ 79,920,000 (as of 2025): 1st: ¥ 37,000,000; 2nd: ¥ 15,000,000; 3rd: ¥ 9,000,000

The Leopard Stakes (Japanese レパードステークス) is a Grade 3 horse race in Japan for three-year-old Thoroughbreds run in August over a distance of 1800 metres at Niigata Racecourse.

The race was first run in 2009 and was promoted to Grade 3 status in 2011.

== Past winners ==
Year	Winner	Jockey	Trainer	Owner	Time
2009	Transcend	Masami Matsuoka	Takayuki Yasuda	Koji Maeda	1:49.5
2010	Miracle Legend ^{[a]}	Hiroshi Kitamura	Hideaki Fujiwara	Teruya Yoshida	1:51.8
2011	Boreas	Yutaka Take	Naohiro Yoshida	Kaneko Makoto Holdings	1:52.0
2012	Hokko Tarumae	Hideaki Miyuki	Katsuichi Nishiura	Koichi Yabe	1:51.8
2013	Incantation	Takuya Ono	Tomohiko Hatsuki	Turf Sport	1:50.3
2014	Asia Express	Keita Tosaki	Takahisa Tezuka	Yukio Baba	1:50.4
2015	Cross Krieger	Yasunari Iwata	Yasushi Shono	Takashi Tsuji	1:51.9
2016	Glanzend	Keita Tosaki	Yukihiro Kato	Silk Racing	1:50.6
2017	Rose Princedom	Takuya Kowata	Yoshihiro Hatakeyama	Makio Okada	1:52.9
2018	Grimm	Hiroyuki Uchida	Kenji Nonaka	Kanayama Holdings	1:52.0
2019	Hayayakko	Hironobu Tanabe	Sakae Kunieda	Kaneko Makoto Holdings	1:51.3
2020	Kenshinko	Genki Maruyama	Kazuo Konishi	Katsuhiko Amano	1:49.2
2021	Meisho Murakumo	Yoshitomi Shibata	Yusuke Wada	Yoshio Matsumoto	1:51.3
2022	Kafuji Octagon	Vincent C Y Ho	Yoshito Yahagi	Mamoru Kato	1:51.9
2023	Riot Grrrl	Mirai Iwata	Naoya Nakamura	Hidaka Farm	1:50.8
2024	Mikki Fight	Keita Tosaki	Hiroyasu Tanaka	Mizuki Noda	1:51.2
2025	Don in the Mood	Kohei Matsuyama	Teiichi Konno	Koichi Yamada	1:50.5
2026	Coeli Vento	Seinosuke Yoshimura	Hisashi Shimizu	Tadahiko Nakamura	1:51.2

^{a} The 2010 winner Miracle Legend was a filly

== See also ==
- Horse racing in Japan
- List of Japanese flat horse races
