= Henny Hughes =

American-bred Thoroughbred racehorse

- Sire: Hennessy
- Grandsire: Storm Cat
- Dam: Meadow Flyer
- Damsire: Meadowlake
- Sex: Stallion
- Foaled: 2003
- Country: United States
- Colour: Chestnut
- Breeder: Liberation Farm
- Owner: Zabeel Racing International
- Trainer: Kiaran McLaughlin
- Record: 10: 6-3-0
- Earnings: $1,124,820

Major wins
- Tremont Stakes (2005); Saratoga Special Stakes (2005); King's Bishop Stakes (2006); Jersey Shore Breeders' Cup Stakes (2006); Vosburgh Stakes (2006)
- Last updated on November 4, 2006

Henny Hughes is a thoroughbred race horse. A foal of 2003, he was a contender for the Triple Crown in 2006. He was taken off the Triple Crown trail in March 2006, then recorded three sprint victories in stakes races before failing in the Breeders' Cup Sprint, finishing 14th and last. He was retired to stud at the end of the 2006 racing season. His best-known offspring is the champion mare Beholder.

== Connections ==
Henny Hughes is owned by Zabeel Racing International and was originally trained by Patrick Biancone but was later transferred to Kiaran McLaughlin. He has been ridden by Gary Stevens, Edgar Prado, Joe Bravo, and John Velazquez. The horse was bred in Kentucky by Liberation Farm, Trackside Farm & CHO, LLC.

== Breeding ==
Henny Hughes is the son of Hennessy out of the mare Meadow Flyer. His sire is a son of Storm Cat. His pedigree includes such notable horses as Secretariat and Bold Ruler.

== Retirement ==
It was announced on November 6, 2006, that Henny Hughes would not race as a four-year-old and would be retired to stud. He stood at Darley Stable at an initial stud fee of $40,000.

Sired Hall of Fame super mare Beholder. Winner of 3 Breeder's Cup races and 13 other graded wins.

== Racing career ==
Date	Race	Track	Location	Distance	Surface	Condition	Finish
June 17, 2005	Maiden	Monmouth Park	Oceanport, New Jersey	5 fur.	Dirt	Fast	1st
July 4, 2005	Tremont Stakes	Belmont Park	Elmont, New York	5 1/2 fur.	Dirt	Fast	1st
July 28, 2005	Saratoga Special Stakes	Saratoga Race Course	Saratoga Springs, New York	6 fur.	Dirt	Fast	1st
August 27, 2005	Hopeful Stakes	Saratoga Race Course	Saratoga Springs, New York	7 fur.	Dirt	Fast	2nd
October 8, 2005	Champagne Stakes	Belmont Park	Elmont, New York	1 mi.	Dirt	Fast	2nd
October 29, 2005	Breeders' Cup Juvenile	Belmont Park	Elmont, New York	1 1/16 mi.	Dirt	Fast	2nd
July 1, 2006	Jersey Shore Breeders' Cup Stakes	Monmouth Park	Oceanport, New Jersey	6 fur.	Dirt	Fast	1st
August 26, 2006	King's Bishop Stakes	Saratoga Race Course	Saratoga Springs, New York	7 fur.	Dirt	Fast	1st
October 7, 2006	Vosburgh Stakes	Belmont Park	Elmont, New York	6 fur.	Dirt	Fast	1st
November 4, 2006	Breeders' Cup Sprint	Churchill Downs	Louisville, Kentucky	6 fur.	Dirt	Fast	14th
