= Aoi Stakes =

Aoi Stakes 葵ステークス
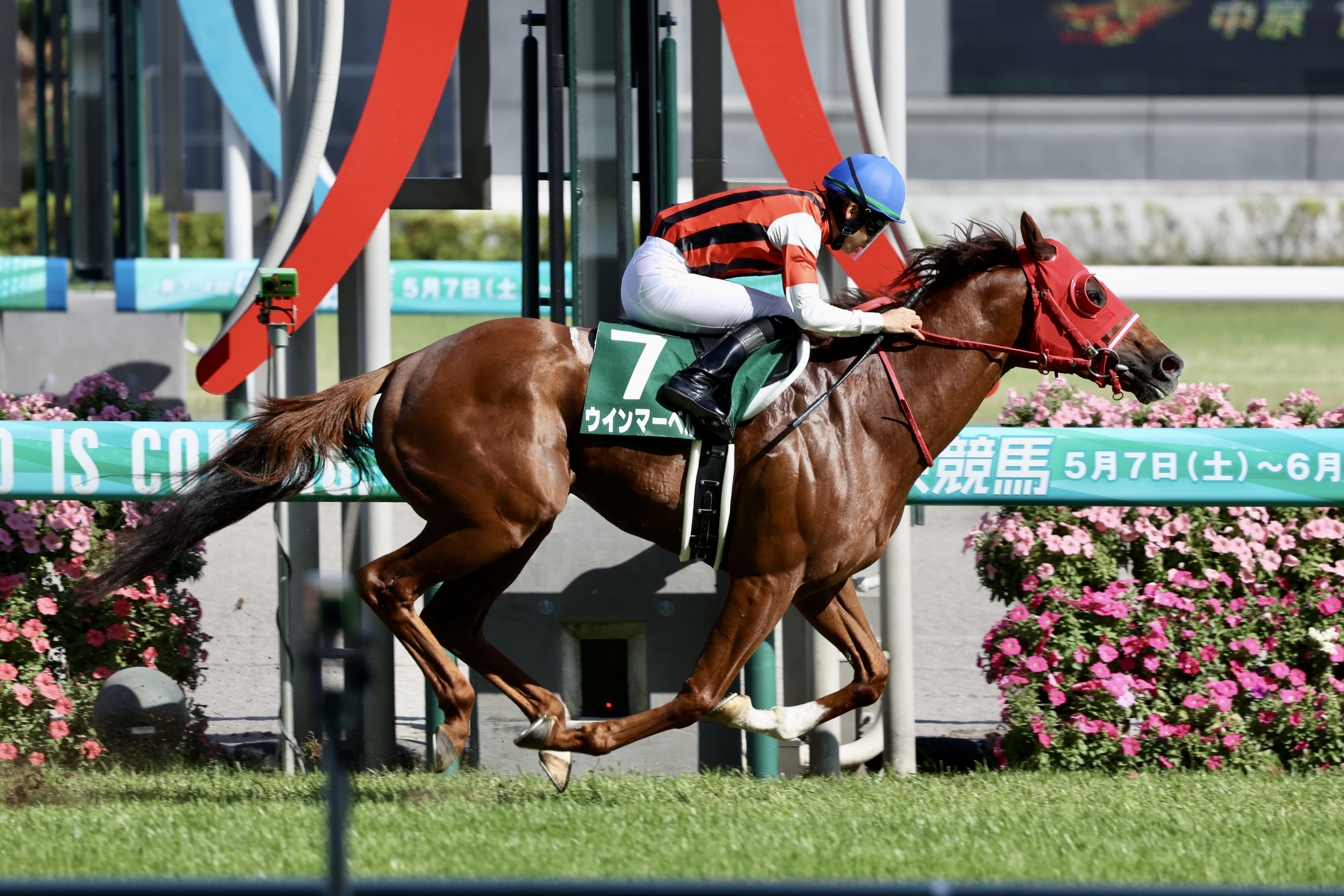
- Win Marvel wins the 2022 Aoi Stakes
- Class: Grade 3
- Location: Kyoto Racecourse
- Inaugurated: 1985
- Race type: Thoroughbred Flat racing

Race information
- Distance: 1,200 meters
- Surface: Turf
- Track: Right-handed
- Qualification: 3yo
- Weight: 56 kg Allowance: Fillies 2 kg
- Purse: ¥ 87,960,000 (as of 2026): 1st: ¥ 41,000,000; 2nd: ¥ 16,000,000; 3rd: ¥ 10,000,000

The Aoi Stakes (Japanese 葵ステークス) is a Grade 3 horse race for three-year-old Thoroughbreds organized by Japan Racing Association. It is run in late May over a distance of 1200 metres on turf at Kyoto Racecourse. Famous horses who have won the race include Calstone Light O and Lord Kanaloa.

The race was first ran as Aoi Sho from 1985 until 1988 before it was renamed to Aoi Stakes. The distance was run at 1,400 meters from 1985 until 1995, then it was shortened to 1,200 meters from 1996 until 2001. The distance was once again increased to 1,400 meters from 2002 until 2009 then it was shortened back to its current distance at 1,200 meters. In 2018, the race was promoted to Grade status but was unable to obtain the current Grade 3 status until 2022.

== Winners since 2000 ==
Year	Winner	Jockey	Trainer	Owner	Time
2000	Breaktime	Mamoru Ishibashi	Shoji Yamamoto	North Hills Management	1:08.0
2001	Calstone Light O	Shigefumi Kumazawa	Hiroyuki Oneda	Sadamitsu Shimizu	1:07.4
2002	Dantsu Judge	Shinji Fujita	Kenji Yamauchi	Tetsuji Yamamoto	1:21.2
2003	Montparnasse	Mikio Matsunaga	Noriaki Tsubo	Tetsuo Tsunoda	1:21.5
2004	Meiner Zest	Hirofumi Shii	Yutaka Takahashi	Thoroughbred Club Ruffian	1:20.9
2005	Symboli Gran	Shigefumi Kumazawa	Yoshihiro Hatakeyama	Symboli Stud	1:20.9
2006	Win Legend	Yuga Kawada	Tsutomu Setoguchi	Win	1:23.0
2007	Kanoya Zakura	Hiroyuki Uemura	Kojiro Hashiguchi	Kaoru Kanda	1:22.6
2008	Million Wave	Koichi Tsunoda	Hiroshi Miyamoto	Kenji Mannami	1:21.7
2009	Eishin Tiger	Yuga Kawada	Masato Nishizono	Toyomitsu Hirai	1:20.4
2010	Keiai Daisy	Hideaki Miyuki	Kenji Yamauchi	Keiai Orthopedic Appliance	1:07.6
2011	Lord Kanaloa	Yuichi Kitamura	Takayuki Yasuda	Lord Horse Club	1:09.3
2012	Makoto Nawaratana	Kota Fujioka	Ippo Sameshima	Sachiko Oda	1:08.0
2013	Teehaff	Yutaka Take	Katsuichi Nishiura	Mohammed bin Rashid Al Maktoum	1:08.7
2014	Real Venus	Kota Fujioka	Akio Adachi	Hoichi Yamauchi	1:07.5
2015	Just Doing	Tsubasa Wada	Kazuya Nakatake	Shinji Maeda	1:08.0
2016	Nac Venus	Manabu Sakai	Hiroaki Sugiura	Kinya Komatsu	1:07.9
2017	Arinna	Yusuke Fujioka	Shigeki Matsumoto	Normandy Thoroughbred Club	1:10.5
2018	Gold Queen	Yoshihiro Furukawa	Masanori Sakaguchi	Mitsuhiko Kato	1:08.0
2019	Dirndl	Yusuke Fujioka	Yutaka Okumura	Silk Racing	1:08.0
2020	Bien Fait	Yusuke Fujioka	Kazuya Nakatake	Koki Maeda	1:08.1
2021	Lei Halia^{[a]}	Heart Kameda	Toshiaki Tajima	Hidaka Breeders Union	1:08.1
2022	Win Marvel^{[a]}	Kohei Matsuyama	Masashi Fukayama	Win	1:08.2
2023	Mozu Meimei	Yutaka Take	Hidetaka Otonashi	Capital System	1:07.1
2024	Puro Magic	Kazuo Yokoyama	Shogo Yasuda	3H Racing	1:07.1
2025	Abu Qir Bay	Mirai Iwata	Tomoyasu Sakaguchi	Godolphin	1:08.3
2026	Dea Veloce	Yuichi Kitamura	Hiroyuki Uemura	TO Racing LLC.	1:07.6

^{a} The 2021 and 2022 editions were contested at Chukyo Racecourse, due to ongoing renovation at the Kyoto Racecourse.

== Earlier winners ==
- 1985 - Long Quick
- 1986 - Lead Triple
- 1987 - Marubutsu Lonely
- 1988 - Great Monte
- 1989 - Osaichi George
- 1990 - Daitaku Helios
- 1991 - Tenzan Hagoromo
- 1992 - Elizabeth Rose
- 1993 - Fuji One Man Cross
- 1994 - Maruka Okan
- 1995 - Isami Sakura
- 1996 - The Gold
- 1997 - Star Programmer
- 1998 - Meisho Ayame
- 1999 - Kool Neige

== See also ==
- Horse racing in Japan
- List of Japanese flat horse races
