= Hakodate Sprint Stakes =

Hakodate Sprint Stakes 函館スプリントステークス
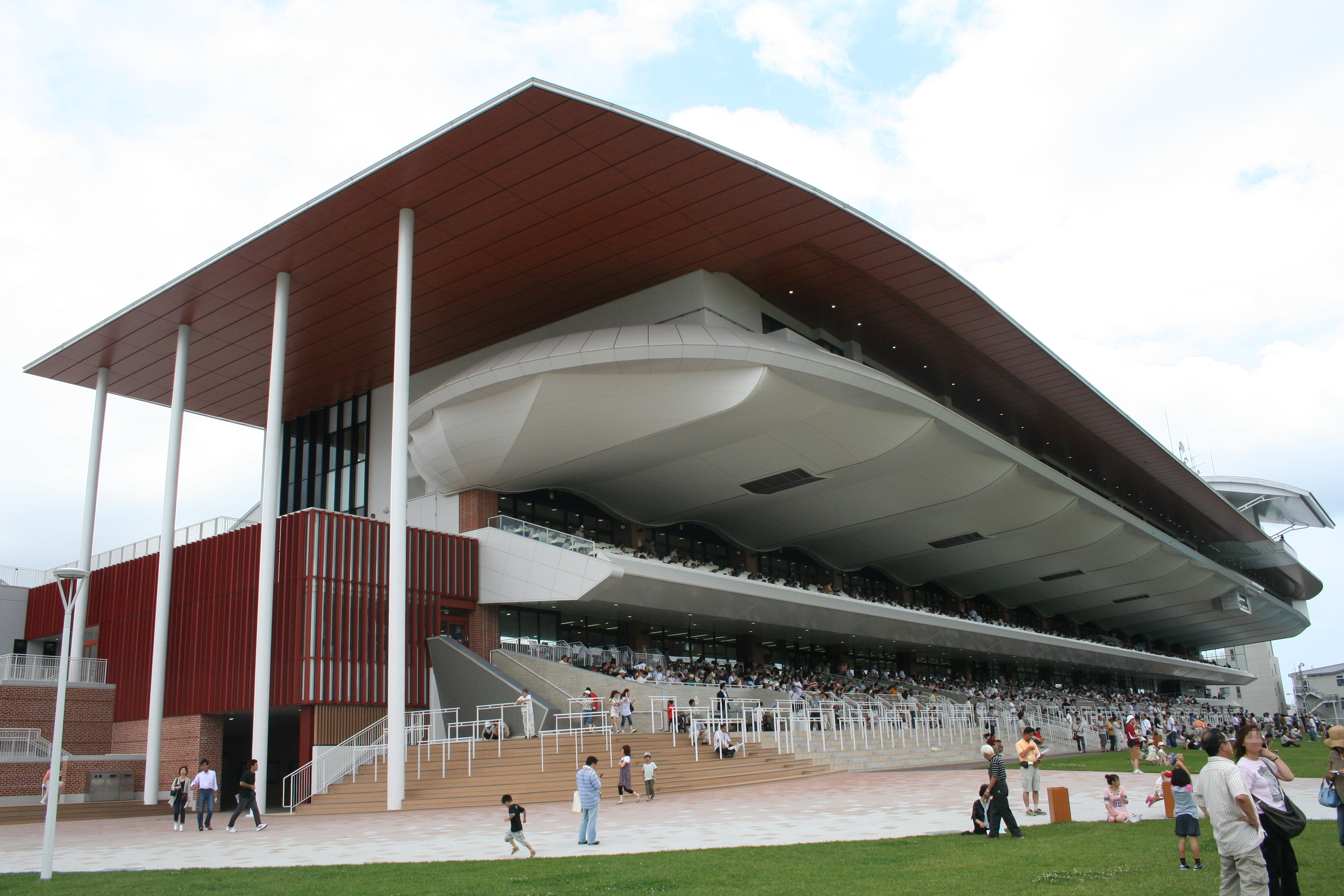
- Hakodate Racecourse
- Class: Grade 3
- Location: Hakodate Racecourse
- Inaugurated: 1994
- Race type: Thoroughbred Flat racing

Race information
- Distance: 1200 metres
- Surface: Turf
- Track: Right-handed
- Qualification: 3-y-o+
- Weight: Special Weight
- Purse: ¥ 87,960,000 (as of 2025): 1st: ¥ 41,000,000; 2nd: ¥ 16,000,000; 3rd: ¥ 10,000,000

The Hakodate Sprint Stakes (Japanese 函館スプリントステークス) is a Grade 3 horse race in Japan for Thoroughbreds aged three and over, run in June over a distance of 1200 metres on turf at Hakodate Racecourse.

It was first run in 1994 and has held Grade 3 status ever since. The race was run at Sapporo Racecourse until 1997.

== Weight ==
54 kg for three-year-olds, 57 kg for four-year-olds and above.

Allowances:

- 2 kg for fillies / mares
- 1 kg for southern hemisphere bred three-year-olds

Penalties (excluding two-year-old race performance):

- If a graded stakes race has been won within a year:
  - 3 kg for a grade 1 win (2 kg for fillies / mares)
  - 2 kg for a grade 2 win (1 kg for fillies / mares)
  - 1 kg for a grade 3 win
- If a graded stakes race has been won for more than a year:
  - 2 kg for a grade 1 win (1 kg for fillies / mares)
  - 1 kg for a grade 2 win

== Records ==
Record time:

- 1:06.6 - Ka Pilina 2025

Most successful horse:

- 2 - Noble Grass 1995, 1996
- 2 - She Is Tosho 2004, 2005

Most wins by a jockey:

- 4 - Kenichi Ikezoe 2004, 2005, 2011, 2018

Most wins by a trainer:

- 3 - Hiroyuki Uehara 1995, 1996, 2018
- 3 - Takayuki Yasuda 2010, 2011, 2017

== Winners since 1994 ==
Year	Winner	Age	Jockey	Trainer	Owner	Time
1994	Gold Mountain	5	Yutaka Take	Masaru Sayama	Green Farm	1:09.3
1995	Noble Grass	4	Futoshi Kojima	Hiroyuki Uehara	Mitsuo Haga	1:09.4
1996	Noble Grass	5	Tomio Yasuda	Hiroyuki Uehara	Mitsuo Haga	1:08.9
1997	Masa Lucky	4	Hiroshi Kawachi	Yutaka Masumoto	Masaki Marui	1:08.8
1998	Keiwan Viking	4	Norihiro Yokoyama	Shinji Okuhira	Kazuya Kitamura	1:09.0
1999	Shinko Forest	6	Hirofumi Shii	Hironori Kurita	Osamu Yasuda	1:09.4
2000	Taiki Treasure	4	Norihiro Yokoyama	Kazuo Fujisawa	Taiki Farm	1:08.7
2001	Mejiro Darling	5	Koshiro Take	Yokichi Okubo	Mejiro Bokujo	1:09.5
2002	Sunningdale	3	Yuichi Fukunaga	Tsutomu Setoguchi	Shigeki Goto	1:10.3
2003	Believe	5	Katsumi Ando	Shigeki Matsumoto	Koji Maeda	1:09.3
2004	She Is Tosho	4	Kenichi Ikezoe	Akio Tsurudome	Tosho Bokujo	1:09.4
2005	She Is Tosho	5	Kenichi Ikezoe	Akio Tsurudome	Tosho Bokujo	1:09.0
2006	Venus Line	5	Shinichiro Akiyama	Noriyuki Hori	Turf Sport	1:09.1
2007	Agnes Raspberry	6	Koichi Tsunoda	Katsuichi Nishiura	Takao Watanabe	1:08.9
2008	Kinshasa no Kiseki	5	Yasunari Iwata	Noriyuki Hori	Kazumi Yoshida	1:08.4
2009	Grand Prix Angel	3	Shigefumi Kumazawa	Yoshito Yahagi	Masashi Kitagawa	1:08.5
2010	One Carat	4	Yusuke Fujioka	Kenichi Fujioka	Yoichi Aoyama	1:08.2
2011	Curren Chan	4	Kenichi Ikezoe	Takayuki Yasuda	Takashi Suzuki	1:08.0
2012	Dream Valentino	5	Kohei Matsuyama	Tadashi Kayo	Saison Race Horse	1:09.4
2013	Pas de Trois	6	Masaki Katsuura	Ippo Sameshima	Teruya Yoshida	1:08.5
2014	Garbo	7	Akihide Tsumura	Hidekatsu Shimizu	Kazuyoshi Ishikawa	1:08.5
2015	Teehaff	5	Yusaku Kokubun	Katsuichi Nishiura	H. H. Sheikh Mohammed	1:08.3
2016	Solveig	3	Kyosuke Maruta	Ippo Sameshima	G1 Racing	1:07.8
2017	Jeune Ecole	3	Yuichi Kitamura	Takayuki Yasuda	Sunday Racing	1:06.8
2018	Seiun Kosei	5	Kenichi Ikezoe	Hiroyuki Uehara	Shigeyuki Nishimura	1:07.6
2019	Kaiser Melange	4	Teruo Eda	Eiji Nakano	Tatsuya Tomomizu	1:08.4
2020	Diatonic	5	Yutaka Take	Takayuki Yasuda	Silk Racing	1:07.5
2021	Bien Fait	4	Yusuke Fujioka	Kazuya Nakatake	Koki Maeda	1:07.6
2022	Namura Clair	3	Suguru Hamanaka	Kodai Hasegawa	Mutsuhiro Namura	1:07.2
2023	Kimiwa Queen	4	Takeshi Yokoyama	Takeshi Okumura	Terumi Urabe	1:08.2
2024	Satono Reve	5	Suguru Hamanaka	Noriyuki Hori	Hajime Satomi	1:08.4
2025	Ka Pilina	4	Keita Tosaki	Toshiaki Tajima	Hidaka Breeders Union	1:06.6 (Note: Set a new course record)
2026	Puro Magic	5	Yuichi Kitamura	Shogo Yasuda	Three H Racing Co. Ltd.	1:07.4

== See also ==
- Horse racing in Japan
- List of Japanese flat horse races
