= Hakodate Racecourse =

Horse racing track in Hakodate, Japan

Hakodate Racecourse 函館競馬場
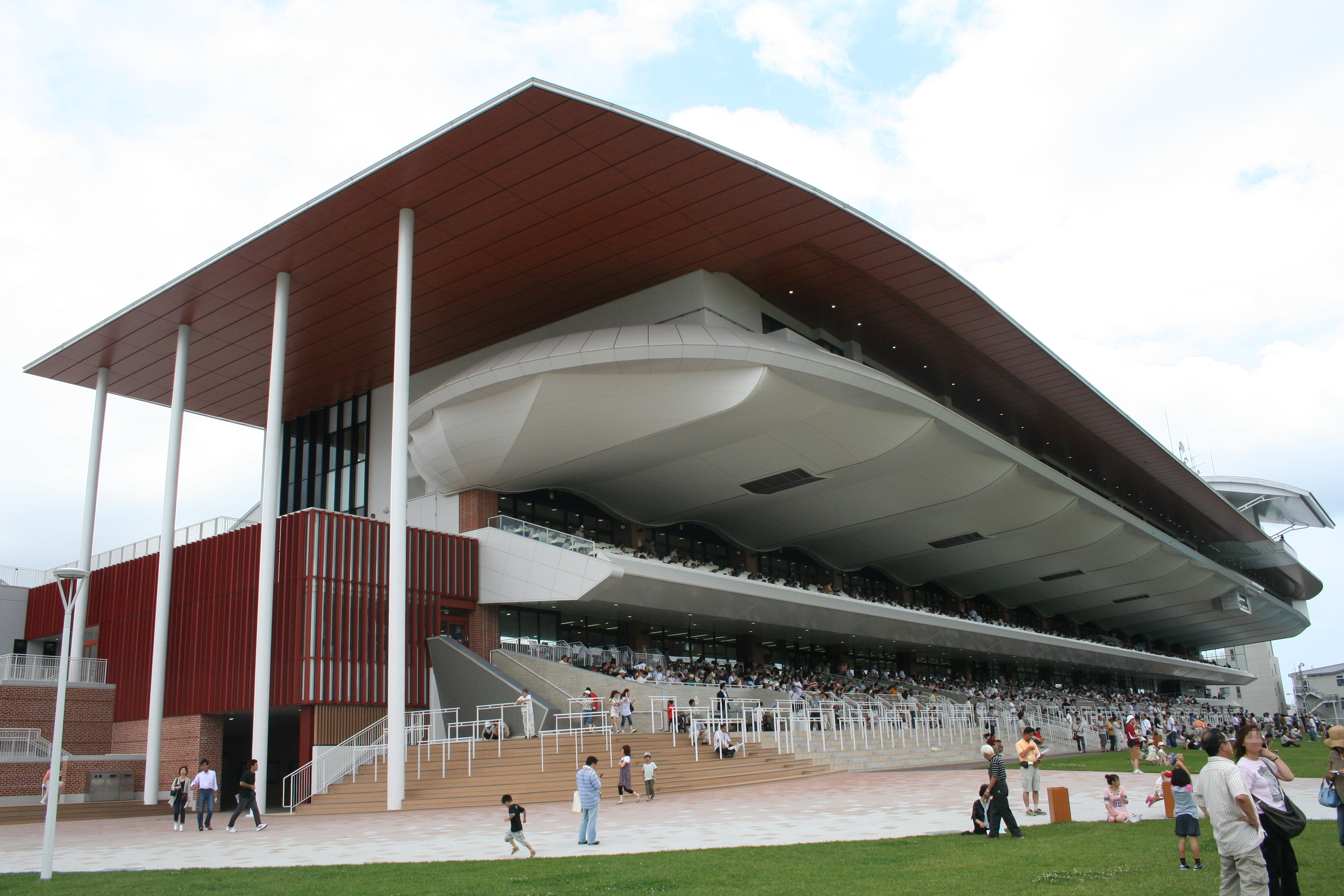
- Hakodate Racecourse Main Stand
- Interactive map of Hakodate Racecourse 函館競馬場
- Location: 12-2 Komaba-chō, Hakodate Hokkaidō, Japan
- Coordinates: 41°46′50.3″N 140°46′31.2″E
- Owned by: Japan Racing Association
- Date opened: 1896
- Race type: Thoroughbred - Flat racing
- Course type: Turf & Dirt
- Notable races: Hakodate Kinen (GIII)

Hakodate Racecourse (函館競馬場, Hakodate-keibajō) is a horse racing track in Hakodate, Japan, built in 1896. During 2008 and 2009, Hakodate Racecourse was closed for renovation and refurbishment of the grandstand. Work was completed in June 2010. As part of this refurbishment, Mitsubishi Electric installed a Diamond Vision Screen. Races that were supposed to be held at Hakodate during that period were moved to Sapporo Racecourse. Hakodate Racecourse has both a grass course, and a dirt course.

== Physical attributes ==
=== Main Turf Course ===
1000m, 1200m, 1700m, 1800m, 2000m, and 2600m races are run on the Main turf Course.

Length	Width
A-course 1,627m	A-course 29m
B-course 1,652m	B-course 25m
C-course 1,677m	C-course 21m

=== Dirt Course ===
1000m, 1700m, and 2400m races run on the dirt oval.

Length	Width
1,476m	20m

== Notable races ==
Month	Race	Distance	Age/Sex
Grade III
June	Hakodate Sprint Stakes	Turf 1200m	3yo +
July	Hakodate Nisai Stakes	Turf 1200m	2yo
July	Hakodate Kinen (Handicap)	Turf 2000m	3yo +

== Track records ==
Source：レコードタイム表 (Record time table) -> 函館競馬場 (Hakodate Racecourse)

- † Reference Time.
- Last updated on August 23, 2026.

=== Turf course (2yo) ===
Distance	Time	Racehorse	Sex	Weight	Jockey	Date Recorded
1000m	56.4	Kaisho	Filly	55kg	Kenichi Ikezoe	June 14, 2025
1200m	1:08.2	Black Chalice	Filly	55kg	Suguru Hamanaka	June 21, 2025
1700m	1:43.8	Win Stone	Colt	53kg	Takaaki Sugahara	August 30, 1986
1800m	1:47.6	Shonan Galleon	Colt	55kg	Katsuma Sameshima	July 5, 2026
2000m	2:03.9†	Rond	Filly	54kg	Yutaka Take	August 1, 2021

=== Turf course (3yo+) ===
Distance	Time	Racehorse	Sex	Weight	Jockey	Date Recorded
1000m	57.0	Solo Singer	Filly 4	53kg	Hirofumi Shii	June 22, 1997
1200m	1:06.6	Ka Pilina	Filly 4	55kg	Keita Tosaki	June 14, 2025
1700m	1:41.0	Keishu Leader	Colt 4	57kg	Yoshiyasu Tajima	August 14, 1983
1800m	1:44.8	Keiai Sena	Horse 6	57kg	Yusuke Fujioka	July 13, 2025
2000m	1:57.6	Veloce Era	Colt 4	56kg	Daisuke Sasaki	June 29, 2025
2600m	2:37.3	Meisho Garden	Filly 4	55kg	Kyōsuke Kokubun	June 17, 2017

=== Dirt course (2yo) ===
Distance	Time	Racehorse	Sex	Weight	Jockey	Date Recorded
1000m	57.9	M Four	Colt	51kg	Miku Kobayashi	July 5, 2025
1700m	1:47.3	Kazu Laponian	Colt	54kg	Kazuo Yokoyama	July 24, 2021

=== Dirt course (3yo+) ===
Distance	Time	Racehorse	Sex	Weight	Jockey	Date Recorded
1000m	57.4	Mame Tank	Colt 3	55kg	Arato Saito	June 27, 2026
1700m	1:41.7	Monde Classe	Horse 5	57kg	Kosei Miura	June 25, 2016
2400m	2:30.1	Shallow First	Colt 3	55kg	Kazuo Yokoyama	July 12, 2026
