= Niigata Racecourse =

Racecourse in Kita-ku, Niigata, Japan

Coordinates: 37.947638°N 139.186452°E

Niigata Racecourse 新潟競馬場
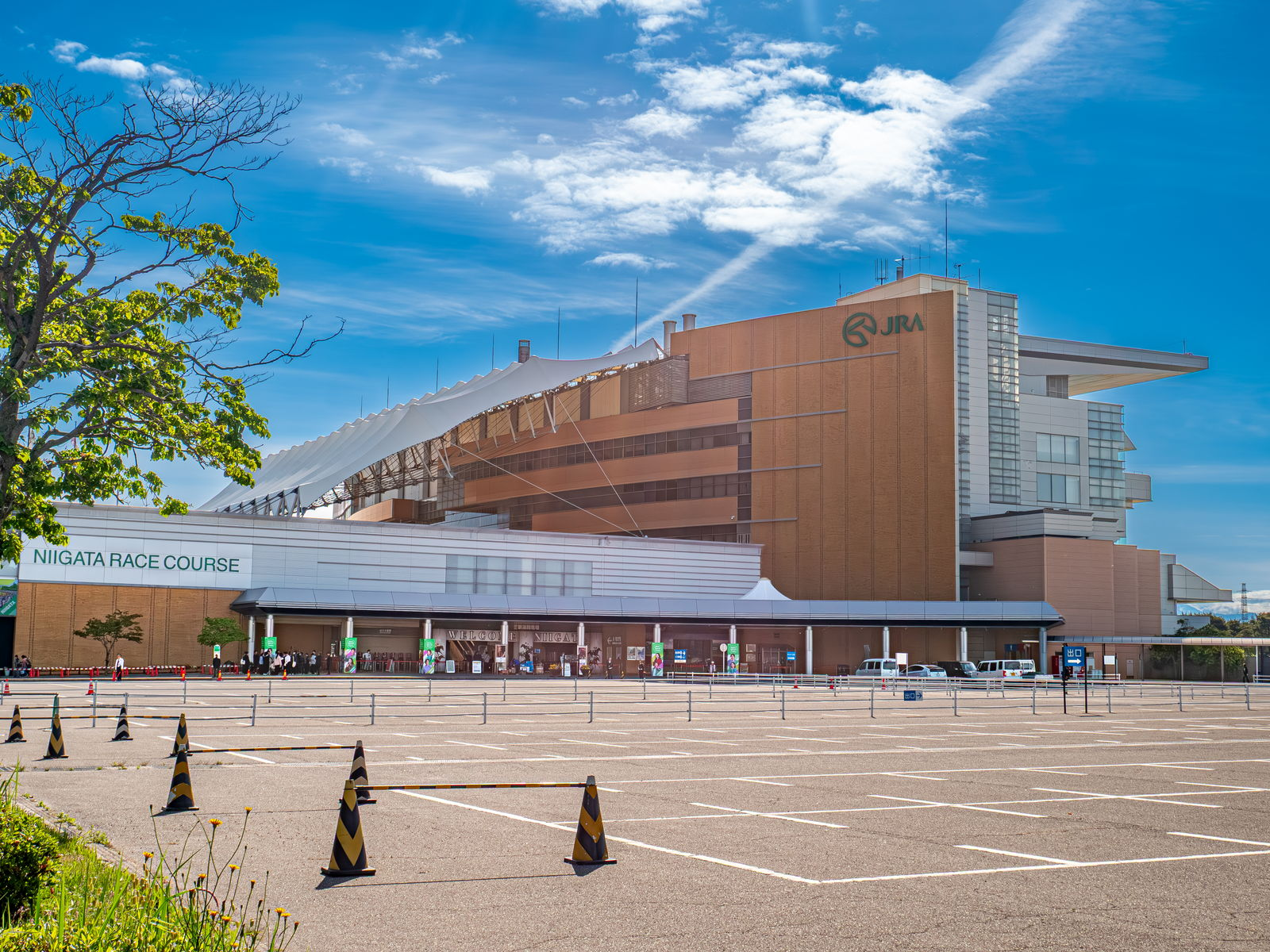
- Niigata Racecourse
- Interactive map of Niigata Racecourse 新潟競馬場
- Location: Kita-ku Niigata, Japan
- Owned by: Japan Racing Association
- Date opened: 1965
- Course type: Flat, Steeplechase
- Notable races: Ibis Summer Dash; Niigata Daishoten

Niigata Racecourse (新潟競馬場, Niigata keibajō) is located in Kita-ku Niigata, Niigata in the Chūbu region of Japan. It is used for horse racing. It was built in 1965. The capacity of the grandstand is 75,000.

== Physical attributes ==
Niigata Race Course has a turf course with two distinct ovals, and a dirt course. Jump races are conducted using fences on the turf course.

The turf's outer oval (外回り, sotomawari) measures 2248m (1 1/4 miles + 144 feet), the inner oval (内回り, uchimawari) measures 1648m (1 + 42 feet) and the straight (直線, chokusen) measures 1000m (1/2 miles + 639 feet).

The dirt course measures 1,472 meters (7/8 miles + 207 feet).

== Notable races ==
Month	Race	Distance	Age/Sex
Grade III
May	Niigata Daishoten (Handicap)	Turf 2000m	4yo+
Jul.	Sekiya Kinen (Handicap)	Turf 1600m	3yo+
Aug.	Ibis Summer Dash	Turf 1000m	3yo+
Aug.	Leopard Stakes	Dirt 1800m	3yo
Aug.	Niigata Kinen	Turf 2000m	3yo+
Sep.	Niigata Nisai Stakes	Turf 1600m	2yo
J-Grade III (Steeplechase)
Aug.	Niigata Jump Stakes	Turf 3250m	3yo+

== Track records ==
Source：レコードタイム表 (Record time table) -> 新潟競馬場 (Niigata Racecourse)

- † Reference Time.
- Last updated on August 23, 2026.

=== Turf course (2yo) ===
Distance	Time	Racehorse	Sex	Weight	Jockey	Date Recorded
1000m	55.0	Regina Forte	Filly	54 kg	Takuya Ono	August 28, 2016
1200m	1:08.7	Tagano Rafflesia	Filly	54 kg	Ryuji Wada	July 20, 2002
1400m	1:20.4	Lukewarm	Filly	55 kg	Akihide Tsumura	August 8, 2026
1600m	1:33.3	Purpur Ray	Colt	54 kg	Mirco Demuro	July 25, 2021
1800m	1:45.5	Embroidery	Filly	55 kg	Christophe Lemaire	July 27, 2024
2000m	2:00.0	La Garriga	Colt	55 kg	Ryusei Sakai	August 9, 2026

=== Turf course (3yo+) ===
Distance	Time	Racehorse	Sex	Weight	Jockey	Date Recorded
1000m	53.5	Puro Magic	Mare 5	56 kg	Hironobu Tanabe	August 2, 2026
1200m	1:07.5	Gun and Rose	Filly 4	54 kg	Katsuharu Tanaka	August 3, 2002
1400m	1:19.0	Magnaten	Gelding 6	57 kg	Yukio Okabe	July 14, 2002
1600m	1:31.0	Kana Tape	Mare 6	54 kg	Rachel King	July 27, 2025
1800m	1:44.0	Cruzeiro do Sul	Colt 4	57 kg	Yuga Kawada	July 27, 2024
2000m	1:58.6	Meiner Lihim	Colt 3	57 kg	Kazuki Kikuzawa	August 8, 2026
Outer 2000m	1:56.4†	Tsujino Wonder	Horse 5	57 kg	Yoshitomi Shibata	July 14, 2001
2200m	2:09.3	Lord Filer	Colt 3	55 kg	Keita Tosaki	August 15, 2026
2400m	2:24.4	Ray of Water	Colt 3	54 kg	Yuichi Fukunaga	July 24, 2021

=== Dirt course (2yo) ===
Distance	Time	Racehorse	Sex	Weight	Jockey	Date Recorded
1200m	1:10.8	Satono Voyage	Colt	55 kg	Keita Tosaki	August 9, 2025
1800m	1:53.0	Shonan Mario	Colt	52 kg	Akira Sugawara	October 5, 2019

=== Dirt course (3yo+) ===
Distance	Time	Racehorse	Sex	Weight	Jockey	Date Recorded
1200m	1:09.1	Mallard the Record	Gelding 5	57 kg	Hayato Yoshida	October 19, 2019
1700m	1:46.6	Makarios	Colt 4	57 kg	Daisaku Matsuda	June 11, 2011
1800m	1:49.2	Kenshinko	Colt 3	56 kg	Genki Maruyama	August 9, 2020
2500m	2:38.8	Meme Lantern	Colt 3	54 kg	Tsubasa Wada	October 6, 2019
