= Sakura Bakushin O =

Japanese-bred Thoroughbred racehorse and sire

Sakura Bakushin O サクラバクシンオー
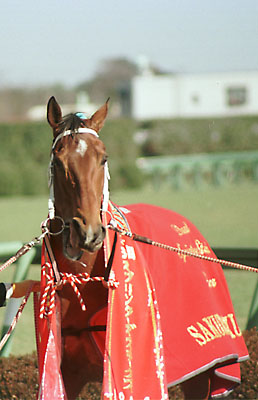
- Sakura Bakushin O after winning the 1994 Sprinters Stakes
- Breed: Thoroughbred
- Sire: Sakura Yutaka O
- Grandsire: Tesco Boy
- Dam: Sakura Hagoromo
- Damsire: Northern Taste
- Sex: Stallion
- Foaled: April 14, 1989
- Died: April 30, 2011 (aged 22)
- Country: Japan
- Colour: Bay
- Breeder: Shadai Farm
- Owner: Sakura Commerce Co.
- Racing colours
- Trainer: Katsutaro Sakai
- Jockey: Futoshi Kojima
- Record: 21: 11-2-1
- Earnings: ¥521,253,000

Major wins
- Sprinters Stakes (1993, 1994); Swan Stakes (1994); Lord Derby Challenge Trophy (1994); Crystal Cup (1992)

Honours
- JRA Award for Best Sprinter or Miler (1994)

Sakura Bakushin O (Japanese: サクラバクシンオー, Hepburn: Sakura Bakushin Ō; 14 April 1989 – 30 April 2011) was a Japanese Thoroughbred racehorse and sire. He is regarded as one of the greatest short-distance race horses in Japanese horse-racing history, winning 11 of his 12 starts in races 1400 meters or shorter, including consecutive victories in the Grade 1 Sprinters Stakes and earning the JRA Award for Best Sprinter or Miler in 1994. However, he never won a race longer than 1400 meters despite nine attempts at them. As a sire, Sakura Bakushin O was also successful, producing numerous graded stakes winners. As a damsire, he has continued to see success, most notably through Kitasan Black.

== Background ==
Sakura Bakushin O was a bay horse with a diamond-shaped white star foaled on April 14, 1989, at the Shadai Farm in Abira, Hokkaido. His sire was Sakura Yutaka O, who was the winner of the 1986 Autumn Tenno Sho. His dam, Sakura Hagoromo, was a daughter of Northern Taste and was a full-sister of 1981 Arima Kinen and 1983 Spring Tenno Sho winner Amber Shadai.

In the fall of 1991, when Sakura Bakushin O was two years old, he was transferred to the Miho Horse Training Center in Ibaraki Prefecture. His trainer Katsutaro Sakai noted that he showed excellent speed, but like his sire Sakura Yutaka O, appeared to have a weak constitution and some leg problems. However, with Sakura Bakushin O being related to Amber Shadai, there was hope that Sakura Bakushin O would eventually be able to do well with longer distance races and was not considered yet to be a sprinter.

== Racing career ==
=== 1992: three-year-old season ===
Sakura Bakushin O made his racing debut in January 1992 in a newcomers race at Nakayama Racecourse's dirt track. Bakushin was the second favorite, but in the race took the lead early and extended to win by five lengths. Two weeks later, he was entered in to the Kurochiku Sho, a 1600-meter open race also at Nakayama. He entered as the favorite, but was beaten in the final straight by Meiner Coat. His third race, a 1200-meter race again at Nakayama, was a victory for Sakura Bakushin O, winning by four lengths and running a time faster than four-year-old horses achieved on the same day. After this success, Sakura Bakushin O's trainer decided it best to focus on shorter-distance sprint races, but agreed with the horse's owner to enter him in to a medium-distance race one more time for a last evaluation. As such, Sakura Bakushin O was entered in to the Spring Stakes at the end of March, a trial race often used in preparation for the Satsuki Shō. Sakura Bakushin O was the third favorite, but his run in the race was poor, finishing only 12th in the 14 horse field, several seconds behind race winner Mihono Bourbon.

After the poor showing at the Spring Stakes, Sakura Bakushin O's trainer abandoned plans to enter him in to the classics races. In mid-April, he was instead entered in to the Grade 3 Crystal Stakes in a return to shorter races. He won by 3 1/2 lengths for his first graded stakes win. His next race, the open Shobu Stakes at Tokyo Racecourse, was also a win, but June, he was entered in to the New Zealand Trophy, a 1600-meter race. Sakura Bakushin O was only able to finish seventh, with the result blamed on a combination of race distance and poor training.

Sakura Bakushin O was rested for the summer. He returned in autumn with a pair of 1600 meter races - the Grade 3 Keisei Hai Autumn Handicap in mid-September and the open Tamagawa Stakes in late October. Sakura Bakushin O did not win either, finishing third and seventh, respectively. In November, he was entered in to the 1400 meter Capital Stakes, where he returned to victory. At the end of December, he was entered in to his first Grade 1 event, the Sprinters Stakes. He entered as the second favorite behind Daitaku Helios. In the race, neither would win, and instead Nishino Flower charged forward from the back and took victory, while Sakura Bakushin O slipped backwards and finished sixth. It would be the only time that Sakura Bakushin O would lose a 1400-meter race.

=== 1993: four-year-old season ===
Sakura Bakushin O suffered leg injuries at the start of 1993, and as a result did not race in the spring or summer. He returned in October with the Autumn Sprint Stakes at Nakayama. He was the second favorite, in part due to not racing in so long, but took victory. At the end of October he was entered in to another 1600 meter race, but finished only fourth. He was then entered in to the Capital Stakes for the second year in a row. He won the race again, setting a similar time as what he had done the previous year.

Sakura Bakushin O was once again entered in to the Sprinters Stakes. He entered the race as the second favorite behind Yamanin Zephyr, who had already won both the Yasuda Kinen and Autumn Tenno Sho in 1993 and had been the second-place finished in the 1992 Sprinters Stakes. In the race, both Sakura Bakushin O and Yamanin Zephyr settled in the mid-pack in the early race, but in the final stretch Sakura Bakushin O broke out to the front and took victory by 2 lengths. It was Sakura Bakushin O's first grade 1 race victory.

At the end of the year, Sakura Bakushin O finished second in voting for the JRA Award for Best Sprinter or Miler, behind Yamanin Zephyr.

=== 1994: five-year-old season ===
For 1994, Sakura Bakushin O's trainer aimed to run him in the spring at the Yasuda Kinen, a Grade I event of 1600 meters, despite the horse having not won at that distance yet. In preparation, Sakura Bakushin O was initially entered in to the Tokyo Shimbun Hai, a race of similar distance, but due to the handicap that would be assigned to him in this race, he was withdrawn and instead entered in to the Lord Derby Challenge Trophy, a 1200-meter race. Sakura Bakushin O won again, pulling out to such a large lead that his jockey was able to pull up before the finish line. In May, Sakura Bakushin O was entered in the Yasuda Kinen as planned. In 1994, the Yasuda Kinen had reached international Grade 1 status, and so attracted entry from multiple horses from overseas, including the American horses Zieten and Ski Paradise, the British horse Sayyedati, and the French horse Dolphin Street. Sakura Bakushin O was third favorite entering the race, with Dolphin Street the favorite. During the race, Sakura Bakushin O was toward the front for most of the race and led entering the final straight, but was unable to keep up in the final straight and fell to fourth, while the horse North Flight took victory.

Sakura Bakushin O was rested for the summer before returning in autumn, with his trainer aiming for a potential run in the autumn Tenno Sho. In early October, he was entered in to the Grade 2 Mainichi Ōkan in preparation for this attempt, marking the first time since 1992 that he ran a race of 1800 meters. He entered the race as the fourth favorite. Sakura Bakushin O led for some of the race, but slipped to fourth, with the eventual Tenno Sho winner Nehai Caesar taking victory. With this loss, his trainer decided to abandon running the Tenno Sho and return to shorter distance races again.

In late October, Sakura Bakushin O was entered in to the grade 2 Swan Stakes. He would win this race by 1/4 length over North Flight. His winning time was 1:19.9, marking the first time that a horse went faster than 1:20 in a 1400-meter race in Japan. The time would also stand as a record for that distance at Hanshin Racecourse until 2017. In November, he was then entered in to the Grade 1 Mile Championship, his final attempt to race at 1600 meters. He was the second favorite behind North Flight. The fight for the win was between himself and North Flight, with North Flight taking victory by 1/2 length.

In December, Sakura Bakushin O was entered in to the Sprinters Stakes for the third year in a row. Prior to the race, his trainer announced that this would be his final race before being retired, regardless of the result. For 1994, the Sprinters Stakes became an international grade 1 event, and like the Yasuda Kinen attracted foreign horses. Zieten, who had run in the Yasuda Kinen, returned for the Sprinters Stakes, along with Soviet Problem, who had finished second in the Breeders' Cup Sprint in America two months earlier. Despite the foreign presence, Sakura Bakushin O was the favorite entering the Sprinters Stakes. In the race, he ran just behind the leaders until the final turn, when he broke free and pulled ahead, taking his second victory in a row in the Sprinter Stakes by four lengths over Biko Pegasus. The American horse Soviet Problem finished seventh and did not place. Sakura Bakushin O's winning time was 1:07.1, a new record for fastest 1200 meters in Japan. This record would stand as a national record until 1997, and a course record for Nakayama until 2001.

Sakura Bakushin O was retired from racing as planned after the Sprinters Stakes, and a retirement ceremony was held at Nakayama Racecourse on 15 January 1995. During the JRA awards at the end of 1994, he was selected as the best sprinter or miler for the year, finishing ahead of North Flight in the voting.

== Stud career ==
Sakura Bakushin O was retired to stud at the Shadai Stallion Station in Abira, Hokkaido. He became a leading sire in Japan, producing numerous graded stakes winners and consistently ranking within the top 10 sires in the country through the 2000s. In 2005, he was second in Japan's sire rankings, only behind Sunday Silence. His offspring, like himself, tended to excel at shorter distance races of 1600 meters or shorter. Some of his most notable offspring include Shonan Kampf, who won the 2002 Takamatsunomiya Kinen, Grand Prix Boss, who won the 2010 Asahi Hai Futurity Stakes and 2011 NHK Mile Cup, and Big Arthur, who won the 2016 Takamatsunomiya Kinen. Overall, Sakura Bakushin O's offspring won over 1,380 races, ranking fifth out of any Japanese sire. Horses foaled by Sakura Bakushin O were present in Japanese horse racing through 2022, when Daishin Balkan, the last of his foals still racing, was retired.

Sakura Bakushin O has also had success as a broodmare sire. Most notably, he is the damsire of Kitasan Black, a JRA Hall of Fame horse with seven Grade I wins who has also become a major sire in Japan. Sakura Bakushin O is also notably the damsire of 2023 Takamatsunomiya Kinen winner First Force, 2025 and 2026 Takamatsunomiya Kinen winner Satono Reve, and 2025 Yushun Himba winner Kamunyak.

Sakura Bakushin O died on 30 April 2011 after suffering heart failure at age 22.

=== Notable progeny ===
c = colt, f = filly, g = gelding

bold = grade 1 stakes

Foaled	Name	Sex	Major Wins
1997	Blandices	c	2004 **Nakayama Daishogai**, **Nakayama Grand Jump**
1998	Shonan Kampf	c	2002 **Takamatsunomiya Kinen**, Swan Stakes, 2003 Hankyu Hai
1999	Blue Shotgun	c	2006 Hankyu Hai
1999	Mejiro Meyer	c	2002 Kisaragi Sho, 2006 Kokura Daishoten
2000	Eishin Tsurugizan	c	2003 New Zealand Trophy
2000	She is Tosho	f	2003 CBC Sho, 2004 Hakodate Sprint Stakes, 2005 Hakodate Sprint Stakes, 2006 CBC Sho, Centaur Stakes
2001	Joyful Heart	c	2008 Hokkaido Sprint Cup
2001	Taisei Brave	c	2003 Hyogo Junior Grand Prix
2003	Denshamichi	c	2005 Keio Hai Nisai Stakes
2003	Sandalphon	c	2009 Kitakyushu Kinen
2003	Taisei Atom	c	2008 Garnet Stakes
2004	Admire Hokuto	c	2007 Falcon Stakes
2004	Headliner	g	2010 CBC Sho
2004	Kanoya Zakura	f	2007 Aoi Stakes, 2008 Ibis Summer Dash, Centaur Stakes, 2009 Ibis Summer Dash
2004	Nishino Charmy	f	2006 Hakodate Nisai Stakes
2005	Marubutsu Easter	c	2007 Kokura Nisai Stakes
2005	Spring Song	c	2010 Keihan Hai
2005	Thanks Note	f	2010 Keio Hai Spring Cup
2007	A Shin Whity	c	2010 Falcon Stakes
2007	Dasher Go Go	c	2010 Centaur Stakes, 2011 CBC Sho, Ocean Stakes
2008	Grand Prix Boss	c	2010 **Asahi Hai Futurity Stakes**, Keio Hai Nisai Stakes, 2011 **NHK Mile Cup**, 2012 Swan Stakes, 2013 Yomiuri Milers Cup
2008	Sugino Endeavour	c	2012 Kitakyushu Kinen
2009	Bakushin Teio	c	2016 Kitakyushu Kinen
2009	Going Power	c	2011 Hyogo Junior Grand Prix
2011	Bel Canto	f	2013 Fantasy Stakes, 2014 Fillies' Revue, 2015 Ibis Summer Dash, Kitakyushu Kinen, 2016 Ibis Summer Dash
2011	Big Arthur	c	2016 **Takamatsunomiya Kinen**, Centaur Stakes

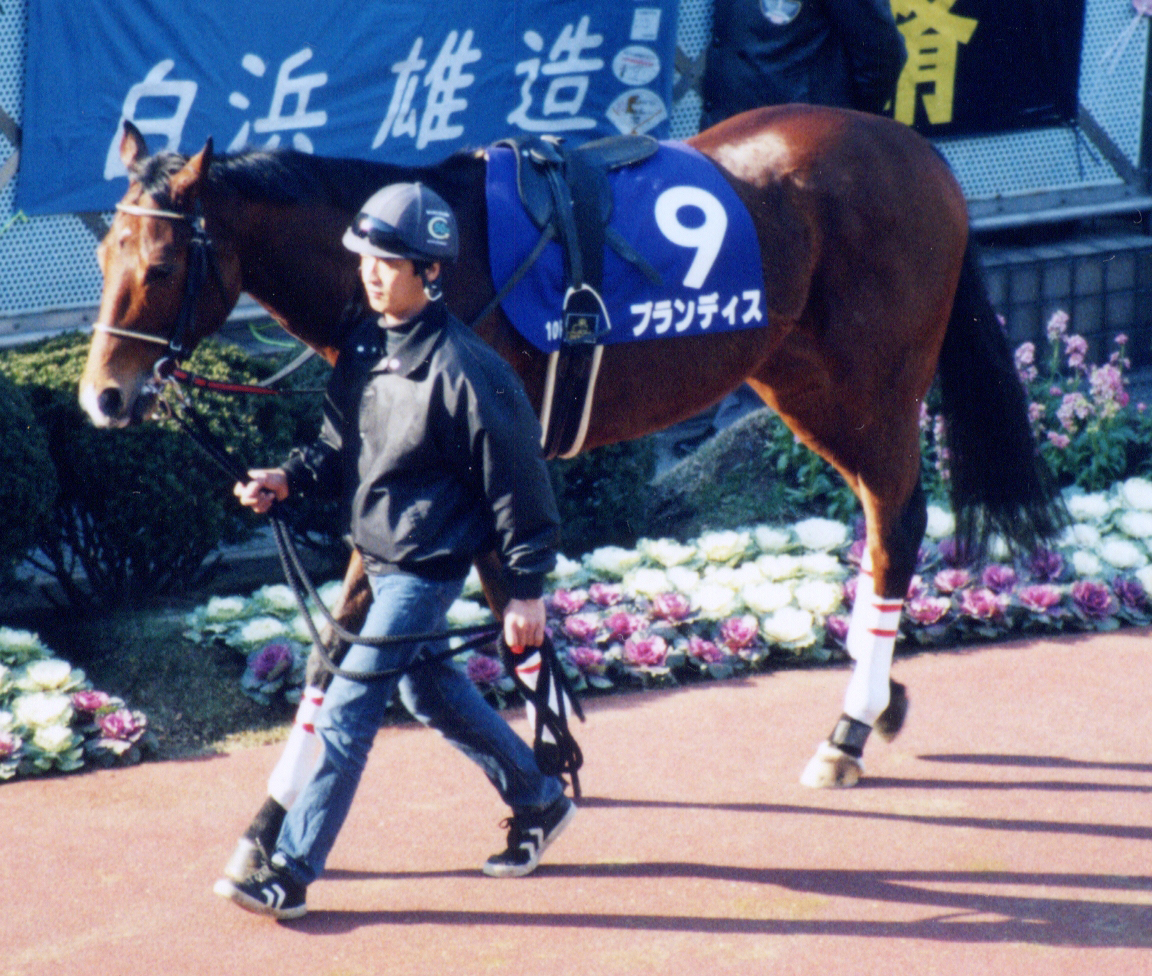
Blandices

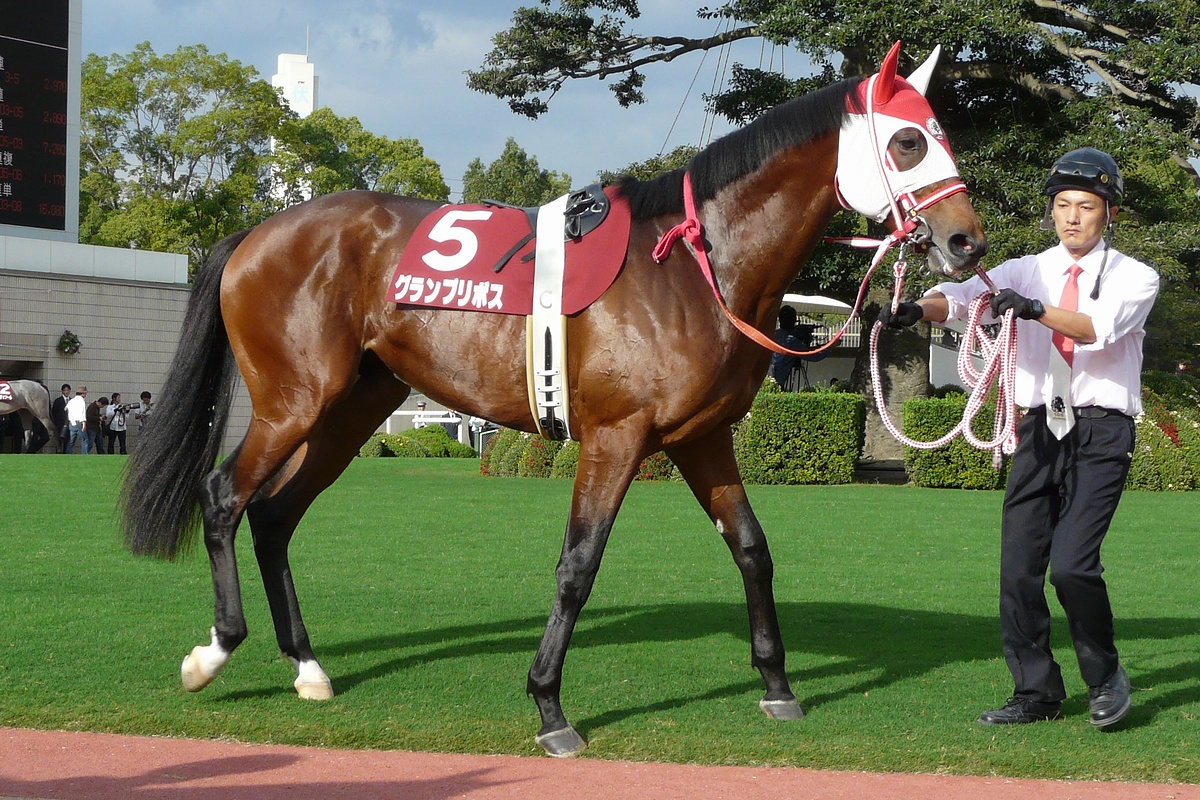
Grand Prix Boss

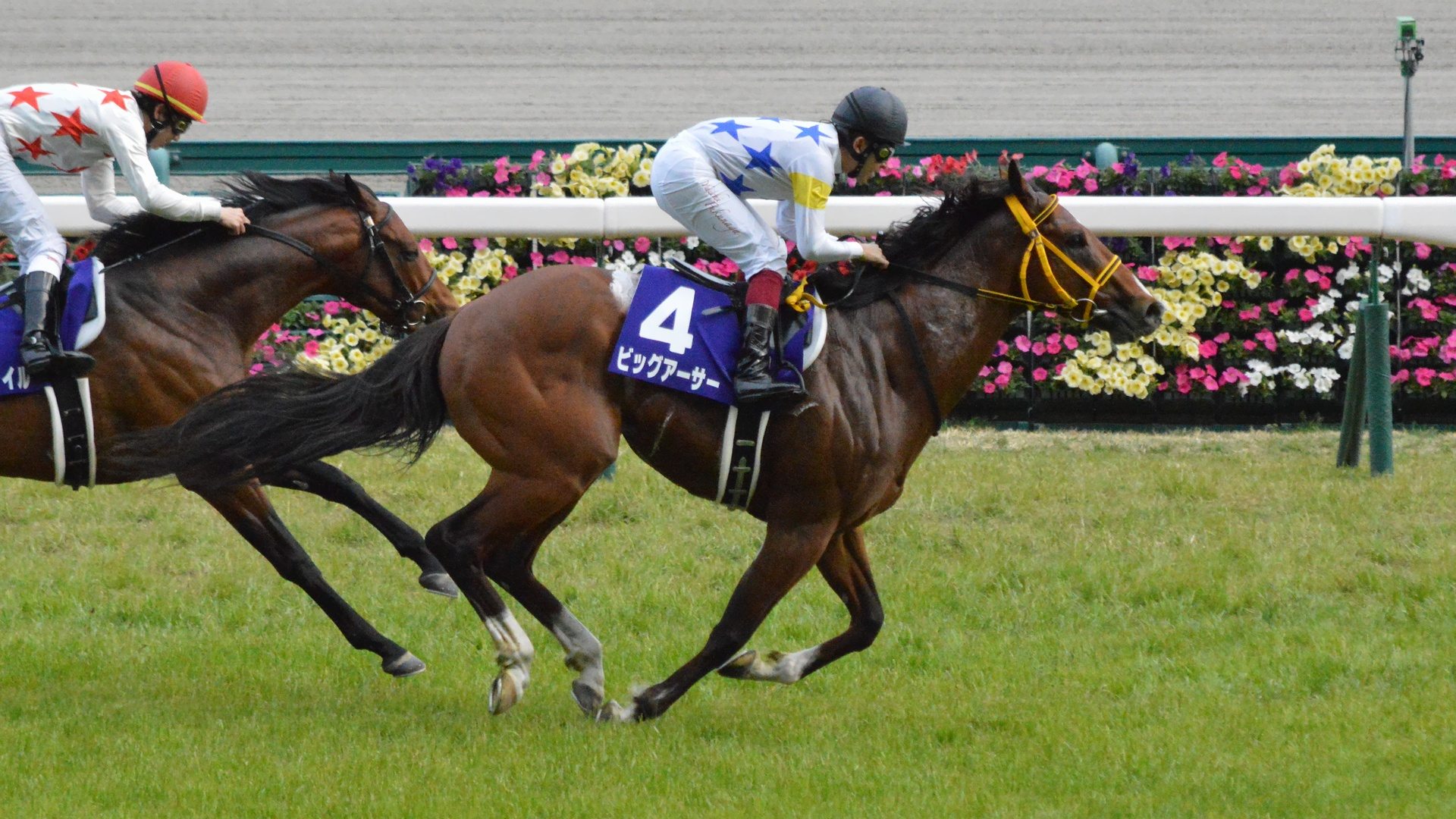
Big Arthur

== In popular culture ==
An anthropomorphized version of Sakura Bakushin O appears as a character in the Japanese multimedia franchise Umamusume: Pretty Derby, voiced by Sachika Misawa. She is depicted as a headstrong but airheaded class representative who is obsessed with being a role model for other students. She aspires to master all race lengths, but her overwhelming preference for speed and lack of stamina prevents her from running successfully in anything longer than mile races.

Due to her dominance over sprint races, Bakushin O is known as the "King of Sprints", in contrast to her rival North Flight being known as the "Queen of Miles". Both are noted to have never won against their rival in their respective specialty distances, though the player can change this. The extremely close and borderline-romantic bond between the two, as seen in the spinoff manga Umamusume: Star Blossom and in an in-game limited event, are references to how, historically, the respective owners of both horses briefly discussed the prospects of breeding them together.

== Racing record ==
Sakura Bakushin O ran in 21 total races in his career. He won 11 of these races, all at distances of 1400 meters or shorter.

Date	Age	Race	Grade	Distance (condition)	Track	Field	Finish	Time	Jockey	1st Place (2nd Place)
12 Jan 1992	3	Three Year Old		1200m (Good)	Nakayama	16	1st	1:11.8	Futoshi Kojima	(Meiner Truth)
26 Jan 1992	3	Kurochiku Sho		1600m (Firm)	Nakayama	11	2nd	1:35.1	Futoshi Kojima	Meiner Coat
14 Mar 1992	3	Sakuraso Tokubestu		1200m (Firm)	Nakayama	12	1st	1:08.8	Futoshi Kojima	(Hayano Raiden)
29 Mar 1992	3	Spring Stakes	GII	1800m (Soft)	Nakayama	14	12th	1:53.6	Futoshi Kojima	Mihono Bourbon
18 Apr 1992	3	Crystal Cup	GIII	1200m (Firm)	Nakayama	11	1st	1:08.6	Futoshi Kojima	(Tai True)
9 May 1992	3	Shobu Stakes	OP	1400m (Firm)	Tokyo	10	1st	1:22.8	Futoshi Kojima	(A. P. Jet)
7 Jun 1992	3	New Zealand Trophy Yonsai Stakes	GII	1600m (Firm)	Tokyo	10	7th	1:36.0	Futoshi Kojima	Shinko Lovely
13 Sep 1992	3	Keisei Hai Autumn Handicap	GIII	1600m (Firm)	Nakayama	13	3rd	1:33.0	Futoshi Kojima	Toshi Green
31 Oct 1992	3	Tamagawa Stakes	OP	1600m (Firm)	Tokyo	12	7th	1:33.5	Futoshi Kojima	Kyoei Bonanza
28 Nov 1992	3	Capital Stakes	OP	1400m (Firm)	Tokyo	16	1st	1:21.1	Futoshi Kojima	(Mr. Tojin)
20 Dec 1992	3	Sprinters Stakes	GI	1200m (Firm)	Nakayama	16	6th	1:08.3	Futoshi Kojima	Nishino Flower
2 Oct 1993	4	Autumn Sprint Stakes	OP	1200m (Firm)	Nakayama	12	1st	1.08.8	Futoshi Kojima	(Fille Du Vent)
30 Oct 1993	4	Ireland Trophy	OP	1600m (Soft)	Tokyo	12	4th	1.35.5	Futoshi Kojima	Iide Zao
27 Nov 1993	4	Capital Stakes	OP	1400m (Firm)	Tokyo	16	1st	1.21.2	Futoshi Kojima	(Air Real)
19 Dec 1993	4	Sprinters Stakes	GI	1200m (Firm)	Nakayama	14	1st	1:07.9	Futoshi Kojima	(Yamanin Zephyr)
3 Apr 1994	5	Lord Derby Challenge Trophy	GIII	1200m (Firm)	Nakayama	13	1st	1.08.9	Futoshi Kojima	(Dojima Muteki)
15 May 1994	5	Yasuda Kinen	GI	1600m (Firm)	Tokyo	16	4th	1:33.7	Futoshi Kojima	North Flight
9 Oct 1994	5	Mainichi Okan	GII	1800m (Firm)	Tokyo	11	4th	1.45.0	Futoshi Kojima	Nehai Caesar
29 Oct 1994	5	Swan Stakes	GII	1400m (Firm)	Hanshin	18	1st	R1.19.9	Futoshi Kojima	(North Flight)
20 Nov 1994	5	Mile Championship	GI	1600m (Firm)	Kyoto	14	2nd	1:33.2	Futoshi Kojima	North Flight
18 Dec 1994	5	Sprinters Stakes	GI	1200m (Firm)	Nakayama	14	1st	R1:07.1	Futoshi Kojima	(Biko Pegasus)

Dirt

== Pedigree ==
Pedigree of Sakura Bakushin O (JPN), bay, 1989
Sire Sakura Yutaka O (JPN) 1982	Tesco Boy (GBR); 1963	Princely Gift (GBR); 1951	Nasrullah (GBR); 1940
Sire Sakura Yutaka O (JPN) 1982	Tesco Boy (GBR); 1963	Princely Gift (GBR); 1951	Blue Gem (GBR); 1943
Sire Sakura Yutaka O (JPN) 1982	Tesco Boy (GBR); 1963	Suncourt (GBR); 1952	Hyperion (GBR); 1930
Sire Sakura Yutaka O (JPN) 1982	Tesco Boy (GBR); 1963	Suncourt (GBR); 1952	Inquisition (GBR); 1936
Sire Sakura Yutaka O (JPN) 1982	Angelica (JPN); 1970	Never Beat (GBR); 1960	Never Say Die (USA); 1951
Sire Sakura Yutaka O (JPN) 1982	Angelica (JPN); 1970	Never Beat (GBR); 1960	Bride Elect (GBR); 1952
Sire Sakura Yutaka O (JPN) 1982	Angelica (JPN); 1970	Star Highness (JPN); 1964	Your Highness (GBR); 1958
Sire Sakura Yutaka O (JPN) 1982	Angelica (JPN); 1970	Star Highness (JPN); 1964	Star Roch (JPN); 1957
Dam Sakura Hagoromo (JPN) 1984	Northern Taste (CAN); 1971	Northern Dancer (CAN); 1961	Nearctic (CAN); 1954
Dam Sakura Hagoromo (JPN) 1984	Northern Taste (CAN); 1971	Northern Dancer (CAN); 1961	Natalma (USA); 1957
Dam Sakura Hagoromo (JPN) 1984	Northern Taste (CAN); 1971	Lady Victoria (CAN); 1962	Victoria Park (CAN); 1957
Dam Sakura Hagoromo (JPN) 1984	Northern Taste (CAN); 1971	Lady Victoria (CAN); 1962	Lady Angela (GBR); 1944
Dam Sakura Hagoromo (JPN) 1984	Clear Amber (USA); 1967	Ambiopoise (USA); 1958	Ambiorix (FRA); 1946
Dam Sakura Hagoromo (JPN) 1984	Clear Amber (USA); 1967	Ambiopoise (USA); 1958	Bull Poise (USA); 1948
Dam Sakura Hagoromo (JPN) 1984	Clear Amber (USA); 1967	One Clear Call (USA); 1960	Gallant Man (GBR); 1954
Dam Sakura Hagoromo (JPN) 1984	Clear Amber (USA); 1967	One Clear Call (USA); 1960	Europa (USA) (Family:4-m); 1949
