= Big Arthur =

Japanese Thoroughbred racehorse (foaled 2011)

Big Arthur; ビッグアーサー
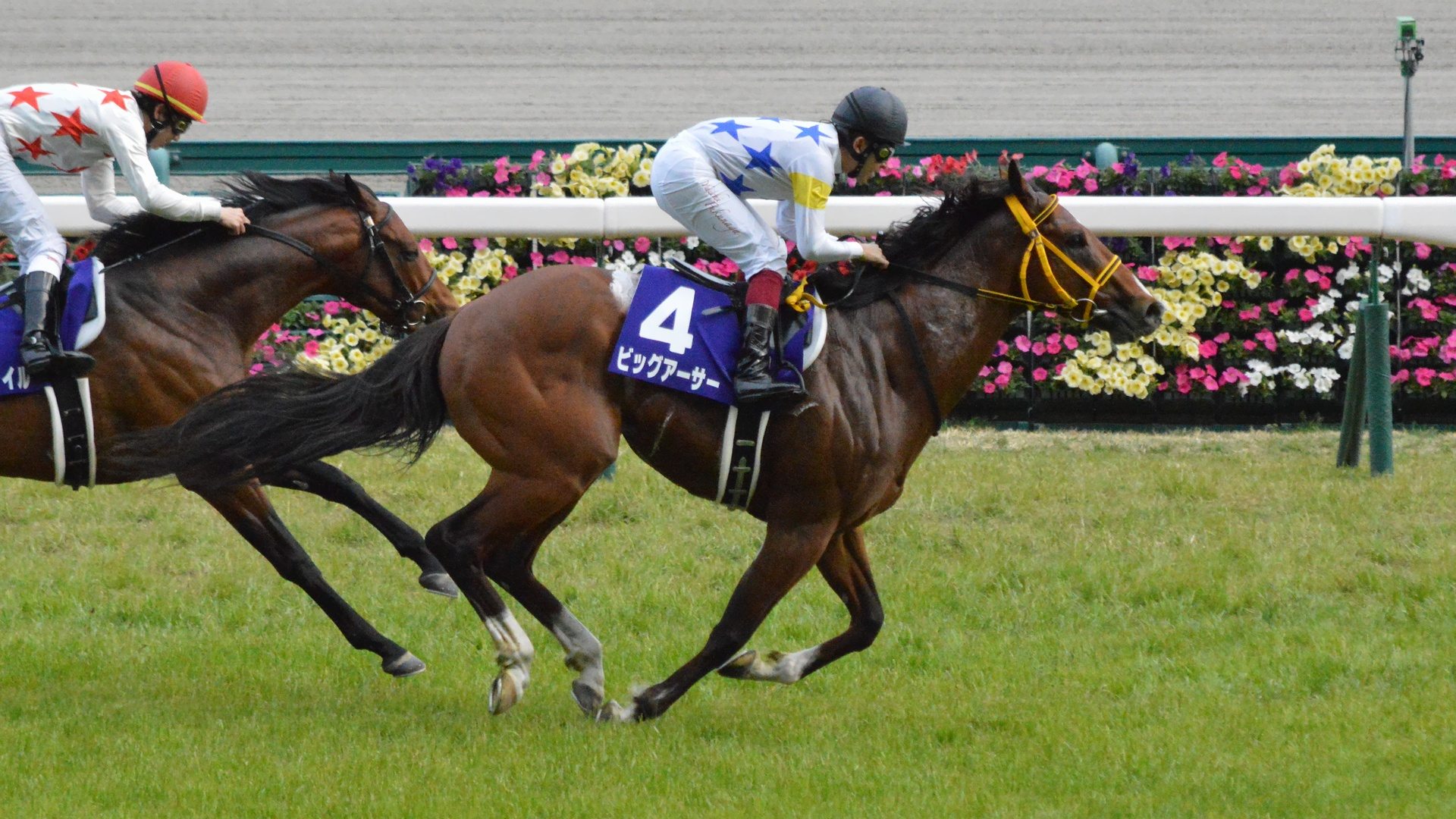
- Big Arthur at the 2016 Takamatsunomiya Kinen
- Breed: Thoroughbred
- Sire: Sakura Bakushin O
- Grandsire: Sakura Yutaka O
- Dam: Shabona
- Damsire: Kingmambo
- Sex: Stallion
- Foaled: 18 March 2011 (age 15)
- Country: Japan
- Colour: Bay
- Breeder: Bamboo Stud
- Owner: Akira Nakatsuji
- Racing colours
- Trainer: Kenichi Fujioka
- Jockey: Kota Fujioka; Suguru Hamanaka; Mirco Demuro; Yuichi Fukunaga; Ryan Moore
- Record: 15: 8-2-1
- Earnings: ¥299,811,000

Major wins
- Takamatsunomiya Kinen (2016); Centaur Stakes (2016)

Big Arthur (Japanese: ビッグアーサー, Biggu Āsā; foaled 18 March 2011) is a retired Japanese Thoroughbred racehorse and active sire. He recorded eight wins from fifteen starts between 2014 and 2017, including the Takamatsunomiya Kinen (GI) and the Centaur Stakes (GII) in 2016. In Hong Kong he raced under the name 大仁大勇.

== Background ==
Big Arthur is a bay stallion bred in Urakawa, Hokkaido, by Bamboo Stud. He was sired by Sakura Bakushin O, and his dam was Shabona (USA), a mare by Kingmambo. He was owned by Akira Nakatsuji and trained by Kenichi Fujioka at the JRA's Ritto Training Center. His younger half-brother Sekifu (by Henny Hughes) won the 2021 Hyogo Junior Grand Prix and the 2023 Elm Stakes.

== Racing career ==
=== 2014: three-year-old season ===
Big Arthur debuted on 13 April 2014 in a maiden race over 1200 metres on turf at Fukushima Racecourse, after the newcomer races had ended. Ridden by Kota Fujioka, he won by 2.5 lengths against experienced runners. He was then sidelined for ten months with an injury sustained during transport.

=== 2015: four-year-old season ===
He returned on 28 February, winning the Yatsushiro Tokubetsu at Kokura Racecourse by 2.5 lengths. He then won the Okazaki Tokubetsu at Chukyo Racecourse with the fastest final furlongs of the race, and the Yodoyabashi Stakes at Hanshin Racecourse, where he won by a neck despite losing a shoe during the race. On 20 June, he won the Minazuki Stakes at Hanshin, defeating two graded stakes winners, for his fifth consecutive win.

On 23 August, he made his graded stakes debut in the Kitakyushu Kinen (GIII) at Kokura, finishing second to Bel Canto. He was then excluded from the Sprinters Stakes after priority entry was given to higher-rated horses. On 11 October, he won the Opal Stakes at Kyoto Racecourse by 3 lengths. On 29 November, he finished second in the Keihan Hai (GIII), a head behind Satono Lupin. On 26 December, he ran in the Hanshin Cup (GII), his only start over 1400 metres, and finished third behind Rosa Gigantea.

=== 2016: five-year-old season ===
Big Arthur began the season on 31 January in the Silk Road Stakes (GIII) at Kyoto, finishing fifth with Mirco Demuro. On 27 March, he contested the Takamatsunomiya Kinen (GI) at Chukyo with Yuichi Fukunaga. He tracked the fast pace in a good position and defeated Mikki Isle by 3/4 length in a course record time of 1:06.7, recording his first Grade 1 victory and the first Grade 1 victory for trainer Kenichi Fujioka.

After a six-month break, he won the Centaur Stakes (GII) at Hanshin on 11 September, leading from the start. On 2 October, he started 1st favourite at 1.8 odds in the Sprinters Stakes (GI) at Nakayama Racecourse. Drawn the inside stall, he was blocked in the straight and finished 12th. On 11 December, he ran in the Hong Kong Sprint (G1) at Sha Tin Racecourse. With Fukunaga injured after a fall the previous week, he was ridden by Ryan Moore and finished 10th.

=== 2017: six-year-old season ===
He missed the Takamatsunomiya Kinen with a bruised left foreleg, and the Centaur Stakes with pain in his left foreleg heel. He went straight to the Sprinters Stakes on 1 October, where his record of thirteen consecutive starts as 1st favourite ended as he started 8th favourite. He finished sixth behind Red Falx. His JRA registration was cancelled on 6 October 2017, and he entered Arrow Stud as a stallion.

== Race record ==
The following table details all 15 starts of Big Arthur's racing career based on official JBIS and netkeiba records. Record current as of his final start on 1 October 2017.

Date	Distance (Condition)	Race	Class	Course	Odds (Favourite)	Field	Finish	Time	Jockey	Winning (Losing) Margin	Winner (2nd Place)	Ref
2014 – three-year-old season
Apr 13	Turf 1200 m (Good)	3-Y-O Maiden	Maiden	Fukushima	8.3 (4th)	16	1st	1:09.5	Kota Fujioka	–0.4	(Crown Iris)	
2015 – four-year-old season
Feb 28	Turf 1200 m (Good)	Yatsushiro Tokubetsu	1-win	Kokura	4.6 (1st)	18	1st	1:07.9	Kota Fujioka	–0.4	(Yamano Hayabusa)	
Mar 29	Turf 1200 m (Yielding)	Okazaki Tokubetsu	2-win	Chukyo	2.1 (1st)	18	1st	1:08.6	Kota Fujioka	–0.3	(Teehaff)	
Apr 11	Turf 1200 m (Yielding)	Yodoyabashi Stakes	3-win	Hanshin	1.4 (1st)	12	1st	1:09.3	Suguru Hamanaka	–0.0	(Époisses)	
Jun 20	Turf 1200 m (Good)	Minazuki Stakes	3-win	Hanshin	1.3 (1st)	13	1st	1:08.1	Kota Fujioka	–0.0	(Forevermore)	
Aug 23	Turf 1200 m (Good)	Kitakyushu Kinen	GIII	Kokura	2.5 (1st)	18	2nd	1:07.5	Kota Fujioka	0.2	Bel Canto	
Oct 11	Turf 1200 m (Good)	Opal Stakes	Open	Kyoto	1.7 (1st)	16	1st	1:06.7	Kota Fujioka	–0.5	(Makoto Nawaratana)	
Nov 29	Turf 1200 m (Good)	Keihan Hai	GIII	Kyoto	1.5 (1st)	15	2nd	1:07.4	Kota Fujioka	0.0	Satono Lupin	
Dec 26	Turf 1400 m (Yielding)	Hanshin Cup	GII	Hanshin	2.7 (1st)	17	3rd	1:21.6	Kota Fujioka	0.2	Rosa Gigantea	
2016 – five-year-old season
Jan 31	Turf 1200 m (Yielding)	Silk Road Stakes	GIII	Kyoto	2.1 (1st)	16	5th	1:08.5	Mirco Demuro	0.6	Dance Director	
Mar 27	Turf 1200 m (Good)	Takamatsunomiya Kinen	GI	Chukyo	3.9 (1st)	18	1st	R1:06.7	Yuichi Fukunaga	–0.1	(Mikki Isle)	
Sep 11	Turf 1200 m (Good)	Centaur Stakes	GII	Hanshin	2.1 (1st)	13	1st	1:07.6	Yuichi Fukunaga	–0.2	(Nero)	
Oct 2	Turf 1200 m (Good)	Sprinters Stakes	GI	Nakayama	1.8 (1st)	16	12th	1:08.0	Yuichi Fukunaga	0.4	Red Falx	
Dec 11	Turf 1200 m (Good)	Hong Kong Sprint	G1	Sha Tin	7.0 (3rd)	13	10th	1:09.47	Ryan Moore	0.67	Aerovelocity	
2017 – six-year-old season
Oct 1	Turf 1200 m (Good)	Sprinters Stakes	GI	Nakayama	16.1 (8th)	16	6th	1:07.8	Yuichi Fukunaga	0.2	Red Falx	

- R indicated that it was a record time finish

== Stud career ==
Big Arthur stood at Arrow Stud from 2018, with 126 foals registered in his first crop. His first winner came on 17 July 2021, when Win Monarch won a maiden race at Fukushima. His stud fee was raised from 1 million yen to 1.5 million yen in 2023 and to 3 million yen in 2024, before returning to 1.5 million yen in 2026.

Foaled	Name	Sex	Major wins
2019	Toshin Macao	c	Centaur Stakes, Keio Hai Spring Cup, Keihan Hai (twice), Ocean Stakes
2020	Kangchenjunga	c	Centaur Stakes, Hankyu Hai
2020	Big Caesar	c	Keihan Hai
2020	Bouton d'Or	c	Hakodate Nisai Stakes

c = colt, f = filly

== Pedigree ==
Pedigree of Big Arthur (JPN)
Sire Sakura Bakushin O (JPN) 1989	Sakura Yutaka O (JPN); 1982	Tesco Boy (GB)	Princely Gift
Sire Sakura Bakushin O (JPN) 1989	Sakura Yutaka O (JPN); 1982	Tesco Boy (GB)	Suncourt
Sire Sakura Bakushin O (JPN) 1989	Sakura Yutaka O (JPN); 1982	Angelica (JPN)	Never Beat
Sire Sakura Bakushin O (JPN) 1989	Sakura Yutaka O (JPN); 1982	Angelica (JPN)	Star Hiness
Sire Sakura Bakushin O (JPN) 1989	Sakura Hagoromo (JPN); 1984	Northern Taste (CAN)	Northern Dancer
Sire Sakura Bakushin O (JPN) 1989	Sakura Hagoromo (JPN); 1984	Northern Taste (CAN)	Lady Victoria
Sire Sakura Bakushin O (JPN) 1989	Sakura Hagoromo (JPN); 1984	Clear Amber (USA)	Ambiopoise
Sire Sakura Bakushin O (JPN) 1989	Sakura Hagoromo (JPN); 1984	Clear Amber (USA)	One Clear Call
Dam Shabona (USA) 2006	Kingmambo (USA); 1990	Mr. Prospector (USA)	Raise a Native
Dam Shabona (USA) 2006	Kingmambo (USA); 1990	Mr. Prospector (USA)	Gold Digger
Dam Shabona (USA) 2006	Kingmambo (USA); 1990	Miesque (USA)	Nureyev
Dam Shabona (USA) 2006	Kingmambo (USA); 1990	Miesque (USA)	Pasadoble
Dam Shabona (USA) 2006	Relish (IRE); 1999	Sadler's Wells (USA)	Northern Dancer
Dam Shabona (USA) 2006	Relish (IRE); 1999	Sadler's Wells (USA)	Fairy Bridge
Dam Shabona (USA) 2006	Relish (IRE); 1999	Reloy (USA)	Liloy
Dam Shabona (USA) 2006	Relish (IRE); 1999	Reloy (USA)	Rescousse

- Big Arthur is inbred 4 × 5, 4 to Northern Dancer and 5 × 5 to Special (within the dam line).

== See also ==
- Thoroughbred racing in Japan
