= Sleepless Night (horse) =

Japanese Thoroughbred racehorse (foaled 2004)

Sleepless Night; スリープレスナイト
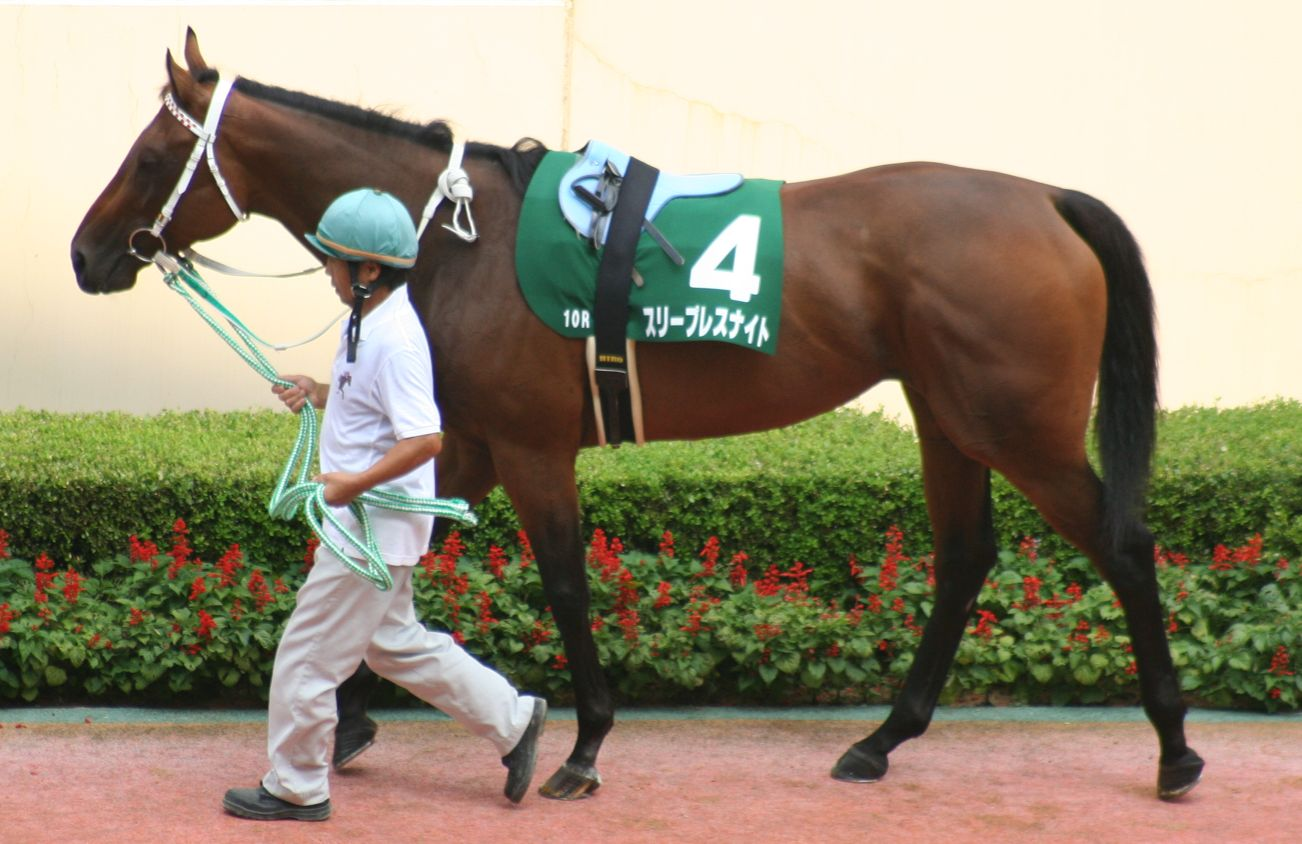
- Sleepless Night at the 2008 Kitakyushu Kinen
- Breed: Thoroughbred
- Sire: Kurofune
- Grandsire: French Deputy
- Dam: What Katy Did
- Damsire: Nureyev
- Sex: Mare
- Foaled: 7 February 2004
- Died: 2 February 2012 (aged 7)
- Country: Japan
- Colour: Bay
- Breeder: Northern Farm
- Owner: Sunday Racing
- Racing colours
- Trainer: Kojiro Hashimoto
- Jockey: Hiroyuki Uemura; Katsumi Ando; Christophe Lemaire; Norihiro Yokoyama
- Record: 18: 9-4-2
- Earnings: ¥373,165,000

Major wins
- Sprinters Stakes (2008); CBC Sho (2008); Kitakyushu Kinen (2008)

Awards
- JRA Award for Best Sprinter or Miler (2008)

Sleepless Night (Japanese: スリープレスナイト, Surīpresu Naito; 7 February 2004 – 2 February 2012) was a Japanese Thoroughbred racehorse and broodmare. She recorded nine wins from eighteen starts between 2007 and 2009, including the Sprinters Stakes (GI), the CBC Sho (GIII) and the Kitakyushu Kinen (JpnIII) in 2008, and was named Best Sprinter that year. Her name translates to "sleepless night", a reference to a famous satirical poem from 1853 about the panic caused by the arrival of Commodore Matthew Perry's "Black Ships" (Kurofune, the namesake of her sire).

== Background ==
Sleepless Night was a bay mare bred in Hayakita, Hokkaido (now Abira), by Northern Farm. She was sired by Kurofune, and her dam was What Katy Did, a mare by Nureyev. Her full brother, Squadron, won the Kuroshio Sprinters Cup. Her dam, What Katy Did, was foaled by Katies; a highly prolific broodmare who also foaled Hishi Amazon and is the damline descendant of Admire Moon and Efforia. She was owned by Sunday Racing and trained by Kojiro Hashimoto at the JRA's Ritto Training Center.

== Racing career ==
=== 2007: three-year-old season ===
Sleepless Night debuted on 7 January 2007 in a 3-year-old newcomer race over 1400 metres on turf at Kyoto Racecourse, finishing second. After a third-place finish, she won her maiden race on dirt over 1200 metres on 10 February by 1.6 seconds. She then won a 1-win class race in May, the Izushi Tokubetsu (2-win) in June, and the Echigo Stakes (3-win) in July, entering the open class. She finished fifth in the Perseus Stakes and the Shimotsuki Stakes, and second in the Galaxy Stakes at Hanshin Racecourse in December.

=== 2008: four-year-old season ===
She began the year with a second-place finish in the Kadomatsu Stakes at Kyoto. On 20 April, she won the Keiyo Stakes at Nakayama Racecourse in a tie-record time of 1:09.1, followed by a victory in the Ritto Stakes at Kyoto in May. On 15 June, she contested the CBC Sho (GIII) at Chukyo Racecourse. Ridden by Hiroyuki Uemura, she defeated Spinning Noir to record her first graded stakes victory, giving Uemura his first graded win in over nine years. On 17 August, she won the Kitakyushu Kinen (JpnIII) at Kokura Racecourse.

On 5 October, she started 1st favourite in the Sprinters Stakes (GI) at Nakayama. She took the lead in the straight and held off the late challenge of Kinshasa no Kiseki to win by 0.2 seconds, securing her first Grade 1 victory and completing a five-race winning streak. She was subsequently registered for the Hong Kong Sprint, but was withdrawn after sustaining an injury, and did not race again that year. She was named Best Sprinter at the 2008 JRA Awards.

=== 2009: five-year-old season ===
Sleepless Night returned on 29 March in the Takamatsunomiya Kinen (GI) at Chukyo. She caught the front-running Laurel Guerreiro in the straight but was repassed, finishing second. After a break, she ran in the Centaur Stakes (GII) at Hanshin on 13 September, finishing second to Ultimo Toule. While being prepared for a second attempt at the Sprinters Stakes, she was diagnosed with a bowed tendon in her right foreleg and was retired. Her JRA registration was cancelled on 1 October 2009.

== Race record ==
The following table details all 18 starts of Sleepless Night's racing career based on official JBIS and netkeiba records. Record current as of her final start on 13 September 2009.

Date	Distance (Condition)	Race	Class	Course	Odds (Favourite)	Field	Finish	Time	Jockey	Winning (Losing) Margin	Winner (2nd Place)	Ref
2007 – three-year-old season
Jan 7	Turf 1400 m (Yielding)	3-Y-O Newcomer	Maiden	Kyoto	1.9 (1st)	16	2nd	1:25.2	Katsumi Ando	0.0	Sugar Vine	
Jan 20	Turf 1600 m (Good)	3-Y-O Maiden	Maiden	Kyoto	1.8 (1st)	16	3rd	1:37.5	Christophe Lemaire	0.2	Wiener Waltz	
Feb 10	Dirt 1200 m (Good)	3-Y-O Maiden	Maiden	Kyoto	1.3 (1st)	16	1st	1:12.8	Katsumi Ando	–1.6	(Three Curacao)	
Mar 3	Dirt 1200 m (Good)	3-Y-O 1-win	1-win	Hanshin	1.5 (1st)	13	2nd	1:12.9	Katsumi Ando	0.2	Magic Bomber	
May 13	Dirt 1200 m (Good)	3-Y-O 1-win	1-win	Kyoto	1.7 (1st)	16	1st	1:11.9	Hiroyuki Uemura	–0.4	(T M Kagemusha)	
Jun 17	Dirt 1200 m (Good)	Izushi Tokubetsu	2-win	Hanshin	3.4 (1st)	16	1st	1:11.7	Hiroyuki Uemura	–0.3	(Agnes Happy)	
Jul 14	Dirt 1200 m (Yielding)	Echigo Stakes	3-win	Niigata	3.4 (2nd)	15	1st	1:11.0	Hiroyuki Uemura	–0.3	(Air Adonis)	
Oct 8	Dirt 1400 m (Good)	Perseus Stakes	Open	Tokyo	3.4 (1st)	16	5th	1:22.9	Hiroyuki Uemura	0.5	Tosen Bright	
Nov 18	Dirt 1400 m (Good)	Shimotsuki Stakes	Open	Tokyo	7.5 (5th)	16	5th	1:23.3	Hiroyuki Uemura	0.5	Admire Subaru	
Dec 9	Dirt 1400 m (Good)	Galaxy Stakes	Open	Hanshin	7.9 (4th)	16	2nd	1:22.5	Hiroyuki Uemura	0.1	Meiner Scherzi	
2008 – four-year-old season
Jan 6	Dirt 1400 m (Good)	Kadomatsu Stakes	Open	Kyoto	4.7 (2nd)	16	2nd	1:24.0	Hiroyuki Uemura	0.1	Trust Jugemu	
Apr 20	Dirt 1200 m (Yielding)	Keiyo Stakes	Open	Nakayama	4.8 (2nd)	16	1st	R1:09.1	Norihiro Yokoyama	–0.0	(Nishino Con Safos)	
May 18	Dirt 1200 m (Good)	Ritto Stakes	Open	Kyoto	2.1 (1st)	16	1st	1:10.7	Hiroyuki Uemura	–0.1	(Joyful Heart)	
Jun 15	Turf 1200 m (Good)	CBC Sho	GIII	Chukyo	7.7 (4th)	18	1st	1:08.0	Hiroyuki Uemura	–0.2	(Spinning Noir)	
Aug 17	Turf 1200 m (Yielding)	Kitakyushu Kinen	JpnIII	Kokura	2.5 (1st)	18	1st	1:07.5	Hiroyuki Uemura	–0.3	(Maruka Phoenix)	
Oct 5	Turf 1200 m (Good)	Sprinters Stakes	GI	Nakayama	2.4 (1st)	16	1st	1:08.0	Hiroyuki Uemura	–0.2	(Kinshasa no Kiseki)	
2009 – five-year-old season
Mar 29	Turf 1200 m (Good)	Takamatsunomiya Kinen	GI	Chukyo	3.5 (1st)	18	2nd	1:08.1	Hiroyuki Uemura	0.1	Laurel Guerreiro	
Sep 13	Turf 1200 m (Good)	Centaur Stakes	GII	Hanshin	2.8 (1st)	15	2nd	1:08.2	Hiroyuki Uemura	0.4	Ultima Thule	

- R indicated that it was a record time finish

== Broodmare career ==
Sleepless Night retired to Northern Farm as a broodmare and produced two foals. Her first foal, Blanche Dame (by Deep Impact), won one race from eight starts. On 23 January 2012, she gave birth to her second foal, an unnamed colt. On the morning of 2 February, she fractured her right radius and died at the age of eight.

== Pedigree ==
Pedigree of Sleepless Night (JPN)
Sire Kurofune (USA) 1998	French Deputy (USA); 1992	Deputy Minister	Vice Regent
Sire Kurofune (USA) 1998	French Deputy (USA); 1992	Deputy Minister	Mint Copy
Sire Kurofune (USA) 1998	French Deputy (USA); 1992	Mitterand	Hold Your Peace
Sire Kurofune (USA) 1998	French Deputy (USA); 1992	Mitterand	Laredo Lass
Sire Kurofune (USA) 1998	Blue Avenue (USA); 1990	Classic Go Go	Pago Pago
Sire Kurofune (USA) 1998	Blue Avenue (USA); 1990	Classic Go Go	Classic Perfection
Sire Kurofune (USA) 1998	Blue Avenue (USA); 1990	Eliza Blue	Icecapade
Sire Kurofune (USA) 1998	Blue Avenue (USA); 1990	Eliza Blue	Corella
Dam What Katy Did (USA) 1989	Nureyev (USA); 1977	Northern Dancer	Nearctic
Dam What Katy Did (USA) 1989	Nureyev (USA); 1977	Northern Dancer	Natalma
Dam What Katy Did (USA) 1989	Nureyev (USA); 1977	Special	Forli
Dam What Katy Did (USA) 1989	Nureyev (USA); 1977	Special	Thong
Dam What Katy Did (USA) 1989	Katies (GB); 1981	Nonoalco	Nearctic
Dam What Katy Did (USA) 1989	Katies (GB); 1981	Nonoalco	Seximee
Dam What Katy Did (USA) 1989	Katies (GB); 1981	Mortefontaine	Politic
Dam What Katy Did (USA) 1989	Katies (GB); 1981	Mortefontaine	Brabantia

- Sleepless Night is inbred 5 × 3 to Northern Dancer and 5 × 4, 4 to Nearctic.
- Sleepless Night’s dam, What Katy Did, is a half-sister to the G1-winning mare Hishi Amazon.

== See also ==
- Thoroughbred racing in Japan
