= Kinshasa no Kiseki =

Australian-bred Japanese Thoroughbred racehorse

Kinshasa no Kiseki キンシャサノキセキ
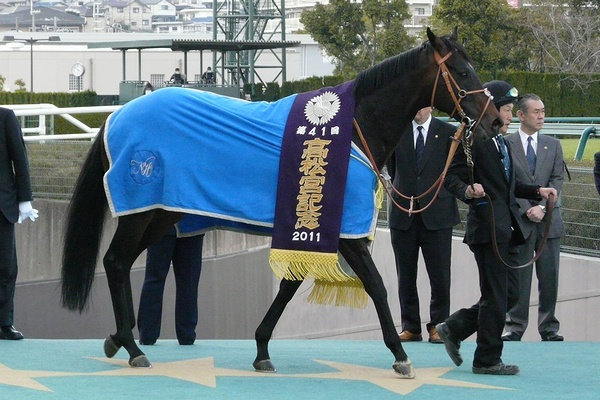
- Kinshasa no Kiseki after winning the 2011 Takamatsunomiya Kinen
- Breed: Thoroughbred
- Sire: Fuji Kiseki
- Grandsire: Sunday Silence
- Dam: Keltshaan
- Damsire: Pleasant Colony
- Sex: Stallion
- Foaled: 24 September 2003
- Country: Australia
- Colour: Bay
- Breeder: Arrowleave Joint Venture
- Owner: Kazumi Yoshida
- Racing colours
- Trainer: Noriyuki Hori
- Jockey: Shinji Fujita; Yasunari Iwata; Hirofumi Shii; Umberto Rispoli
- Record: 31: 12-4-3
- Earnings: ¥785,306,000

Major wins
- Hakodate Sprint Stakes (2008); Swan Stakes (2009); Hanshin Cup (2009, 2010); Ocean Stakes (2010); Takamatsunomiya Kinen (2010, 2011)

Awards
- JRA Award for Best Sprinter or Miler (2010)

Kinshasa no Kiseki (Japanese: キンシャサノキセキ, Hepburn: Kinshasa no Kiseki; foaled 24 September 2003) is a retired Australian-bred, Japanese-trained Thoroughbred racehorse and active sire. He competed from 2005 to 2011, recording twelve wins in thirty-one starts, including consecutive runnings of the Takamatsunomiya Kinen in 2010 and 2011. He received the JRA Award for Best Sprinter or Miler in 2010.

== Background ==
Kinshasa no Kiseki is a bay horse bred in Australia by Arrowleave Joint Venture. He was sired by Fuji Kiseki, a son of Sunday Silence. His dam, Keltshaan, was sired by Pleasant Colony. He was purchased by Kazumi Yoshida and trained by Noriyuki Hori. During his career, he was ridden by jockeys including Yasunari Iwata, Hirofumi Shii, Umberto Rispoli, and Christophe Soumillon.

== Racing career ==
Kinshasa no Kiseki debuted in December 2005 at Nakayama Racecourse, winning his maiden start on the turf. In 2006, he contested the NHK Mile Cup (GI), finishing third. He won allowance races at Kyoto and Tokyo later that year. In 2007, he won the Tanigawadake Stakes and the Capital Stakes.

In 2008, he finished second in the Takamatsunomiya Kinen (GI) and the Sprinters Stakes (GI), and won the Hakodate Sprint Stakes (GIII). In 2009, he won the Swan Stakes (GII) and the Hanshin Cup (GII).

In 2010, he won the Ocean Stakes (GIII), the Takamatsunomiya Kinen (GI), and the Hanshin Cup (GII). He also finished third in the Sprinters Stakes and the Mile Championship (GI). In 2011, he won the Takamatsunomiya Kinen for the second time, ridden by Umberto Rispoli. He was retired following this race.

== Statistics ==
The following table details all 31 starts of Kinshasa no Kiseki's racing career based on official netkeiba race charts.

Date	Distance (Condition)	Race	Class	Course	Odds (Favourite)	Field	Finish	Time	Winning (Losing) Margin	Winner (2nd Place)	Jockey	Ref
2005 – two-year-old season
Dec 3	Turf 1200 m (Firm)	2-Y-O Newcomer	Maiden	Nakayama	1.8 (1st)	12	1st	1:11.7	–0.4	(Yakumo Cat)	Fuyuki Igarashi	
2006 – three-year-old season
Jan 5	Turf 1600 m (Firm)	Junior Cup	Open	Nakayama	6.1 (5th)	12	1st	1:33.6	0.0	(Admire Carib)	Yuichi Shibayama	
Feb 25	Turf 1600 m (Firm)	Arlington Cup	GIII	Hanshin	2.5 (1st)	15	6th	1:35.8	1.1	Suteki Shinsukekun	Yuichi Shibayama	
Apr 2	Turf 1400 m (Soft)	Marguerite Stakes	Open	Hanshin	1.5 (1st)	11	4th	1:26.6	0.5	M S World	Yutaka Take	
May 7	Turf 1600 m (Firm)	NHK Mile Cup	GI	Tokyo	14.8 (6th)	18	3rd	1:33.4	0.2	Logic	Katsumi Ando	
Oct 7	Turf 1600 m (Good)	Ireland Trophy	Allowance (3 win)	Tokyo	2.5 (1st)	16	4th	1:33.6	0.3	Nishino Nurse Call	Katsumi Ando	
Nov 5	Turf 1400 m (Firm)	Katsuragawa Stakes	Allowance (3 win)	Kyoto	3.4 (1st)	15	1st	1:19.4	–0.5	(Spinning Noir)	Katsumi Ando	
Nov 19	Turf 1600 m (Firm)	Mile Championship	GI	Kyoto	13.2 (5th)	18	5th	1:33.2	0.5	Daiwa Major	Shinichiro Akiyama	
2007 – four-year-old season
Jan 6	Turf 1600 m (Good)	Kyoto Kimpai	GIII	Kyoto	4.0 (1st)	16	6th	1:34.3	0.4	Meiner Scherzi	Katsumi Ando	
Feb 25	Turf 1400 m (Firm)	Hankyu Hai	GIII	Hanshin	3.0 (1st)	16	4th	1:20.7	0.2	Precise Machine	Olivier Peslier	
Apr 29	Turf 1400 m (Firm)	Tanigawadake Stakes	Open	Niigata	1.8 (1st)	16	1st	1:20.1	–0.1	(Peer Gynt)	Shinji Fujita	
Sep 9	Turf 1200 m (Firm)	Centaur Stakes	GII	Hanshin	2.6 (1st)	16	3rd	1:07.9	0.8	Sans Adieu	Shinji Fujita	
Nov 23	Turf 1600 m (Firm)	Capital Stakes	Open	Tokyo	5.5 (2nd)	18	1st	1:32.8	–0.1	(Air Shady)	Shinji Fujita	
2008 – five-year-old season
Jan 5	Turf 1600 m (Firm)	Kyoto Kimpai	GIII	Kyoto	5.1 (2nd)	16	10th	1:34.3	0.7	Eishin Deputy	Shinji Fujita	
Mar 2	Turf 1400 m (Firm)	Hankyu Hai	GIII	Hanshin	4.5 (2nd)	16	5th	1:21.3	0.6	Laurel Guerreiro	Katsumi Ando	
Mar 30	Turf 1200 m (Firm)	Takamatsunomiya Kinen	GI	Chukyo	9.3 (5th)	18	2nd	1:07.1	0.0	Fine Grain	Yasunari Iwata	
Jul 6	Turf 1200 m (Firm)	Hakodate Sprint Stakes	GIII	Hakodate	1.8 (1st)	16	1st	1:08.4	–0.1	(Tosho Courage)	Yasunari Iwata	
Aug 31	Turf 1200 m (Firm)	Keeneland Cup	GIII	Sapporo	2.0 (1st)	16	3rd	1:08.1	0.2	Tanino Martini	Yasunari Iwata	
Oct 5	Turf 1200 m (Firm)	Sprinters Stakes	GI	Nakayama	5.9 (2nd)	16	2nd	1:08.2	0.2	Sleepless Night	Yasunari Iwata	
2009 – six-year-old season
Mar 7	Turf 1200 m (Good)	Ocean Stakes	GIII	Nakayama	2.9 (1st)	16	10th	1:09.5	0.3	Urbanity	Yasunari Iwata	
Mar 29	Turf 1200 m (Firm)	Takamatsunomiya Kinen	GI	Chukyo	9.0 (5th)	18	10th	1:08.8	0.8	Laurel Guerreiro	Yasunari Iwata	
Oct 4	Turf 1200 m (Firm)	Sprinters Stakes	GI	Nakayama	9.6 (4th)	16	12th	1:07.9	0.4	Laurel Guerreiro	Kosei Miura	
Oct 31	Turf 1400 m (Firm)	Swan Stakes	GII	Kyoto	8.6 (4th)	18	1st	1:20.3	0.0	(Early Robusto)	Christophe Soumillon	
Dec 20	Turf 1400 m (Firm)	Hanshin Cup	GII	Hanshin	4.7 (1st)	18	1st	1:20.4	–0.2	(Premium Box)	Mirco Demuro	
Dec 20	Turf 1400 m (Firm)	Hanshin Cup	GII	Hanshin	4.7 (1st)	18	1st	1:20.4	–0.2	(San Carlo)	Mirco Demuro	
2010 – seven-year-old season
Mar 6	Turf 1200 m (Soft)	Ocean Stakes	GIII	Nakayama	4.2 (2nd)	16	1st	1:09.8	0.0	(A Shin F Danz)	Hirofumi Shii	
Mar 28	Turf 1200 m (Firm)	Takamatsunomiya Kinen	GI	Chukyo	3.7 (1st)	18	1st	1:08.6	0.0	(B B Guldan)	Hirofumi Shii	
Sep 12	Turf 1200 m (Firm)	Centaur Stakes	GII	Hanshin	–	15	Scratched	–	–	Dasher Go Go	Hirofumi Shii	
Oct 3	Turf 1200 m (Firm)	Sprinters Stakes	GI	Nakayama	5.6 (3rd)	16	2nd	1:07.6	0.2	Ultra Fantasy	Hirofumi Shii	
Nov 21	Turf 1600 m (Firm)	Mile Championship	GI	Kyoto	7.2 (3rd)	18	13th	1:32.5	0.7	A Shin Forward	Ryan Moore	
Dec 18	Turf 1400 m (Firm)	Hanshin Cup	GII	Hanshin	3.9 (2nd)	17	1st	1:20.3	0.0	(Red Spada)	Christophe Soumillon	
2011 – eight-year-old season
Mar 5	Turf 1200 m (Firm)	Ocean Stakes	GIII	Nakayama	3.6 (2nd)	16	2nd	1:07.9	0.1	Dasher Go Go	Umberto Rispoli	
Mar 27	Turf 1200 m (Firm)	Takamatsunomiya Kinen	GI	Hanshin (Note: The 2011 Takamatsunomiya Kinen was relocated to Hanshin due to track renovations at Chukyo.)	4.5 (3rd)	16	1st	1:07.9	–0.2	(San Carlo)	Umberto Rispoli	

== Stud record ==
He moved to stud in 2011 at Shadai Stallion Station in Abira, Hokkaido with a fee of ¥1,500,000 after the confirmation of pregnancy.

=== Notable progeny ===
This data is available based on the JBIS Stallion Report.
c = colt, f = filly, g = gelding
bold: GI/JpnI grade winners

**Foaled**	**Name**	**Sex**	**Major Wins**
2013	Shuji	c	Kokura Nisai Stakes, Hanshin Cup
2014	Monde Can Know	c	Keio Hai Nisai Stakes
2014	Success Energy	c	Kakitsubata Kinen, Kurofune Sho, Oval Sprint, Hyogo Gold Trophy, Tokyo Hai, Sakitama Hai
2015	Beluga	f	Fantasy Stakes
2015	Hiraboku la Tache	c	Saga Kinen
2015	Kemono	g	Hakodate Nisai Stakes
2016	Daishin Clover	g	Kyoto High Jump
2017	Galore Creek	c	Spring Stakes
2017	Luftstrom	g	New Zealand Trophy
2019	Fern Hill	c	**JBC Sprint**
2020	Rivara	f	Fantasy Stakes
2021	Pair Pollux	c	Ocean Stakes

== Pedigree ==
Pedigree of Kinshasa no Kiseki (AUS)
Sire Fuji Kiseki 1992	Sunday Silence; 1986	Halo	Hail to Reason
Sire Fuji Kiseki 1992	Sunday Silence; 1986	Halo	Cosmah
Sire Fuji Kiseki 1992	Sunday Silence; 1986	Wishing Well	Understanding
Sire Fuji Kiseki 1992	Sunday Silence; 1986	Wishing Well	Mountain Flower
Sire Fuji Kiseki 1992	Millracer; 1983	Le Fabuleux	Wild Risk
Sire Fuji Kiseki 1992	Millracer; 1983	Le Fabuleux	Anguar
Sire Fuji Kiseki 1992	Millracer; 1983	Marston's Mill	In Reality
Sire Fuji Kiseki 1992	Millracer; 1983	Marston's Mill	Millicent
Dam Keltshaan 1994	Pleasant Colony; 1978	His Majesty	Ribot
Dam Keltshaan 1994	Pleasant Colony; 1978	His Majesty	Flower Bowl
Dam Keltshaan 1994	Pleasant Colony; 1978	Sun Colony	Sunrise Flight
Dam Keltshaan 1994	Pleasant Colony; 1978	Sun Colony	Colonia
Dam Keltshaan 1994	Featherhill; 1978	Lyphard	Northern Dancer
Dam Keltshaan 1994	Featherhill; 1978	Lyphard	Goofed
Dam Keltshaan 1994	Featherhill; 1978	Lady Berry	Violon d'Ingres
Dam Keltshaan 1994	Featherhill; 1978	Lady Berry	Moss Rose

== See also ==
- Thoroughbred racing in Japan
- Takamatsunomiya Kinen
