= JRA Award for Best Sprinter or Miler =

Japanese thoroughbred horse racing award

The JRA Award for Best Sprinter or Miler is a title awarded annually by the Japan Racing Association (JRA). Since 1987 the honor has been part of the JRA Awards. A single prize was awarded until 2023, when separate categories for Sprinters and Milers were created.

== Records ==
Most successful horse (2 wins):

- Bamboo Memory – 1989, 1990
- Taiki Shuttle – 1997, 1998
- Durandal – 2003, 2004
- Daiwa Major – 2006, 2007
- Lord Kanaloa – 2012, 2013
- Gran Alegria – 2020, 2021

== Best Sprinter or Miler Winners ==
Year	Horse	Trainer	Owner	Age
1987	Nippo Teio	Kinzo Kubota	Yuichi Yamaishi	4
1988	Soccer Boy	Yukiharu Ono	Shadai Racing	3
1989	Bamboo Memory	Kunihiko Takeshi	Takeda Tatsuichi	4
1990	Bamboo Memory	Kunihiko Takeshi	Takeda Tatsuichi	5
1991	Daiichi Ruby	Yuji Ito	Haruo Tsujimoto	4
1992	Nishino Flower	Masahiro Matsuda	Masayuki Nishiyama	3
1993	Yamanin Zephyr	Yusuke Kurita	Hajime Doi	5
1994	Sakura Bakushin O	Katsutaro Sakai	Sakura Commerce	5
1995	Hishi Akebono	Masaru Sayama	Masaichiro Abe	3
1996	Flower Park	Shouichi Matsumoto	Katsumi Yoshida	4
1997	Taiki Shuttle	Kazuo Fujisawa	Taiki Farm Co.	3
1998	Taiki Shuttle	Kazuo Fujisawa	Taiki Farm Co.	4
1999	Air Jihad	Masanori Ito	Lucky Field Co.	4
2000	Daitaku Yamato	Sei Ishizaka	Kazuo Nakamura	6
2001	Trot Star	Eiji Nakano	Minoru Takano	5
2002	Admire Cozzene	Mitsuru Hashida	Riichi Kondo	6
2003	Durandal	Masahiro Sakaguchi	Teruya Yoshida	4
2004	Durandal	Masahiro Sakaguchi	Teruya Yoshida	5
2005	Hat Trick	Katsuhiko Sumii	Carrot Farm	4
2006	Daiwa Major	Hiroyuki Uehara	Keizo Oshiro	5
2007	Daiwa Major	Hiroyuki Uehara	Keizo Oshiro	6
2008	Sleepless Night	Kojiro Hashiguchi	Sunday Racing	4
2009	Laurel Guerreiro	Mitsugu Kon	Laurel Racing	5
2010	Kinshasa no Kiseki	Noriyuki Hori	Kazumi Yoshida	7
2011	Curren Chan	Takayuki Yasuda	Takashi Suzuki	4
2012	Lord Kanaloa	Takayuki Yasuda	Lord Horse Club	4
2013	Lord Kanaloa	Takayuki Yasuda	Lord Horse Club	5
2014	Snow Dragon	Noboru Takagi	Makio Okada	6
2015	Maurice	Noriyuki Hori	Kazumi Yoshida	4
2016	Mikki Isle	Hidetaka Otonashi	Mizuki Noda	5
2017	Red Falx	Tomohito Ozeki	TokyoHorseRacing Co Ltd	6
2018	Fine Needle	Yoshitada Takahashi	Godolphin	5
2019	Indy Champ	Hidetaka Otonashi	Silk Racing	4
2020	Gran Alegria	Kazuo Fujisawa	Sunday Racing	4
2021	Gran Alegria	Kazuo Fujisawa	Sunday Racing	5
2022	Serifos	Mitsumasa Nakauchida	G1 Racing Co. Ltd	3

== Best Sprinter winners ==
Year	Horse	Trainer	Owner	Age
2023	Mama Cocha	Yasutoshi Ikee	Kaneko Makoto Holdings	4
2024	Lugal	Haruki Sugiyama	Yoshimasa Ema	4
2025	Satono Reve	Noriyuki Hori	Hajime Satomi	6

== Best Miler winners ==
Year	Horse	Trainer	Owner	Age
2023	Songline	Toru Hayashi	Sunday Racing	5
2024	Soul Rush	Yasutoshi Ikee	Tatsue Ishikawa	6
2025	Jantar Mantar	Tomokazu Takano	Shadai Race Horse Co. Ltd.	4
