= Kokura Daishoten =

Kokura Daishoten 小倉大賞典
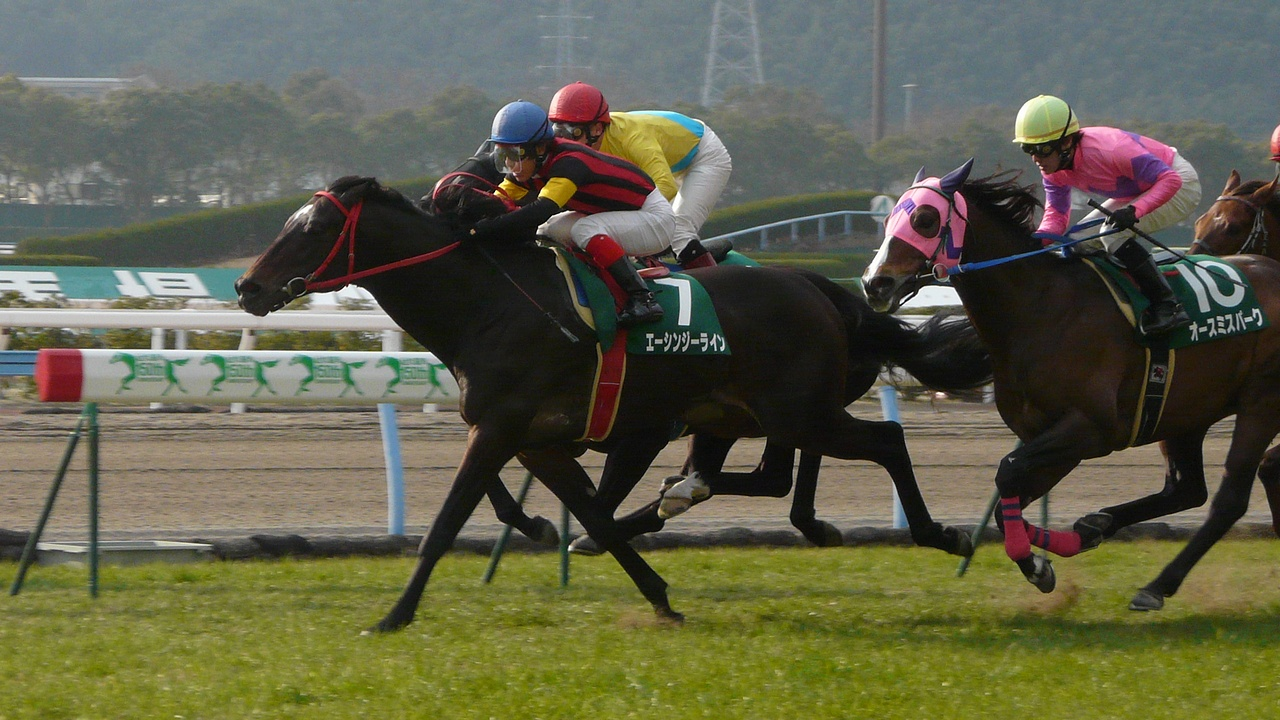
- A Shin G Line wins the 2012 Kokura Daishoten
- Class: Grade 3
- Location: Kokura Racecourse, Kokuraminami-ku, Kitakyushu, Japan
- Inaugurated: 1967
- Race type: Thoroughbred Flat racing

Race information
- Distance: 1800 metres
- Surface: Turf
- Track: Right-handed
- Qualification: 4-y-o+
- Weight: Handicap
- Purse: ¥ 92,980,000 (as of 2025): 1st: ¥ 43,000,000; 2nd: ¥ 17,000,000; 3rd: ¥ 11,000,000

The Kokura Daishoten (Japanese 小倉大賞典) is a Grade 3 horse race for Thoroughbreds aged four and over, run in February over a distance of 1800 metres on turf at Kokura Racecourse.

The Kokura Daishoten was first run in 1967 and has held Grade 3 status since 1984. The race was run at Hanshin Racecourse in 1969 and 1982 and at Chukyo Racecourse in 1998, 1999 and 2010.

== Winners since 2000 ==
Year	Winner	Age	Jockey	Trainer	Time
2000	Jo Big Bang	5	Yamada Kazuhiro	Noriaki Tsubo	1:48.0
2001	Misuzu Chardon	6	Mirco Demuro	Keiji Kato	1:49.5
2002	Tamamo Hibiki	6	Yoshiyuki Obara	Isami Obara	1:48.0
2003	Meiner Blau	6	Shinji Kawashima	Masatoshi Ando	1:49.1
2004	Meisho Battler	4	Shinji Fujita	Shigetada Takahashi	1:49.1
2005	Meisho Kaido	6	Yutaka Take	Masahiro Sakaguchi	1:46.4
2006	Mejiro Meyer	7	Yuga Kawada	Yohiyasu Tajima	1:47.2
2007	Asaka Defeat	9	Futoshi Komaki	Akio Tsurudome	1:46.8
2008	Asaka Defeat	10	Eiji Nakadate	Akio Tsurudome	1:47.7
2009	Sunrise Max	5	Norihiro Yokoyama	Yasuda Masumoto	1:44.9
2010	Osumi Spark	5	Kota Fujioka	Katsumi Minai	1:47.2
2011	Sunrise Vega	7	Shinichiro Akiyama	Hidetaka Otonashi	1:45.3
2012	A Shin G Line	7	Haruhiko Kawasu	Masanori Sakaguchi	1:46.3
2013	Hit The Target	5	Takuya Ono	Keiji Kato	1:46.4
2014	Last Impact	4	Yuga Kawada	Hiroyoshi Matsuda	1:45.3
2015	Curren Black Hill	6	Shinichiro Akiyama	Osamu Hirata	1:48.3
2016	Albert Dock	4	Yuga Kawada	Hiroyoshi Matsuda	1:46.7
2017	Maltese Apogee	5	Tomoharu Bushizawa	Masahiro Horii	1:45.8
2018	Triomphe	4	Yuga Kawada	Naosuke Sugai	1:46.1
2019	Stiffelio	5	Genki Maruyama	Hidetaka Otonashi	1:46.7
2020	Cadenas	6	Katsuma Sameshima	Kazuya Nakatake	1:48.3
2021	Territorial	7	Yukito Ishikawa	Katsuichi Nishiura	1:45.5
2022	Arrivo	4	Kazuo Yokoyama	Haruki Sugiyama	1:49.2
2023	Hindu Times	7	Bauyrzhan Murzabayev	Takashi Saito	1:49.7
2024	Epiphany	5	Makoto Sugihara	Keisuke Miyata	1:45.1
2025	Long Run	7	Yuji Tannai	Yusuke Wada	1:46.1
2026	Tagano Dude	5	Yoshihiro Furukawa	Ryoji Yagi	1:45.2

== Earlier winners ==
- 1967 - Kuribatsuku
- 1968 - Atlas
- 1969 - Dai Ichi O
- 1970 - Uchu O
- 1971 - BT Eight
- 1972 - Fellow Speed
- 1973 - Shibatake
- 1974 - Noboru Toko
- 1975 - Rokko Ichi
- 1976 - Great Fighter
- 1977 - Aranjuez
- 1978 - Miyaji Marengo
- 1979 - Agnes Press
- 1980 - Green Dash
- 1981 - Rovel Gifts
- 1982 - Nishino Chenille
- 1983 - Snark Arrow
- 1984 - Yamano Shiragiko
- 1985 - Global Dyna
- 1986 - Machikane Ishin
- 1987 - Tosho Leo
- 1988 - Tosho Leo
- 1989 - Daikatsu Kenzan
- 1990 - Mr Yamano
- 1991 - Let's Go Tarquin
- 1992 - Wide Battle
- 1993 - One More Love Way
- 1994 - Meisho Marine
- 1995 - Meisho Regnum
- 1996 - Aratami Wonder
- 1997 - Osumi Max
- 1998 - Silence Suzuka
- 1999 - Suehiro Commander

== See also ==
- Horse racing in Japan
- List of Japanese flat horse races
