= Noriyuki Hori =

Japanese racehorse trainer

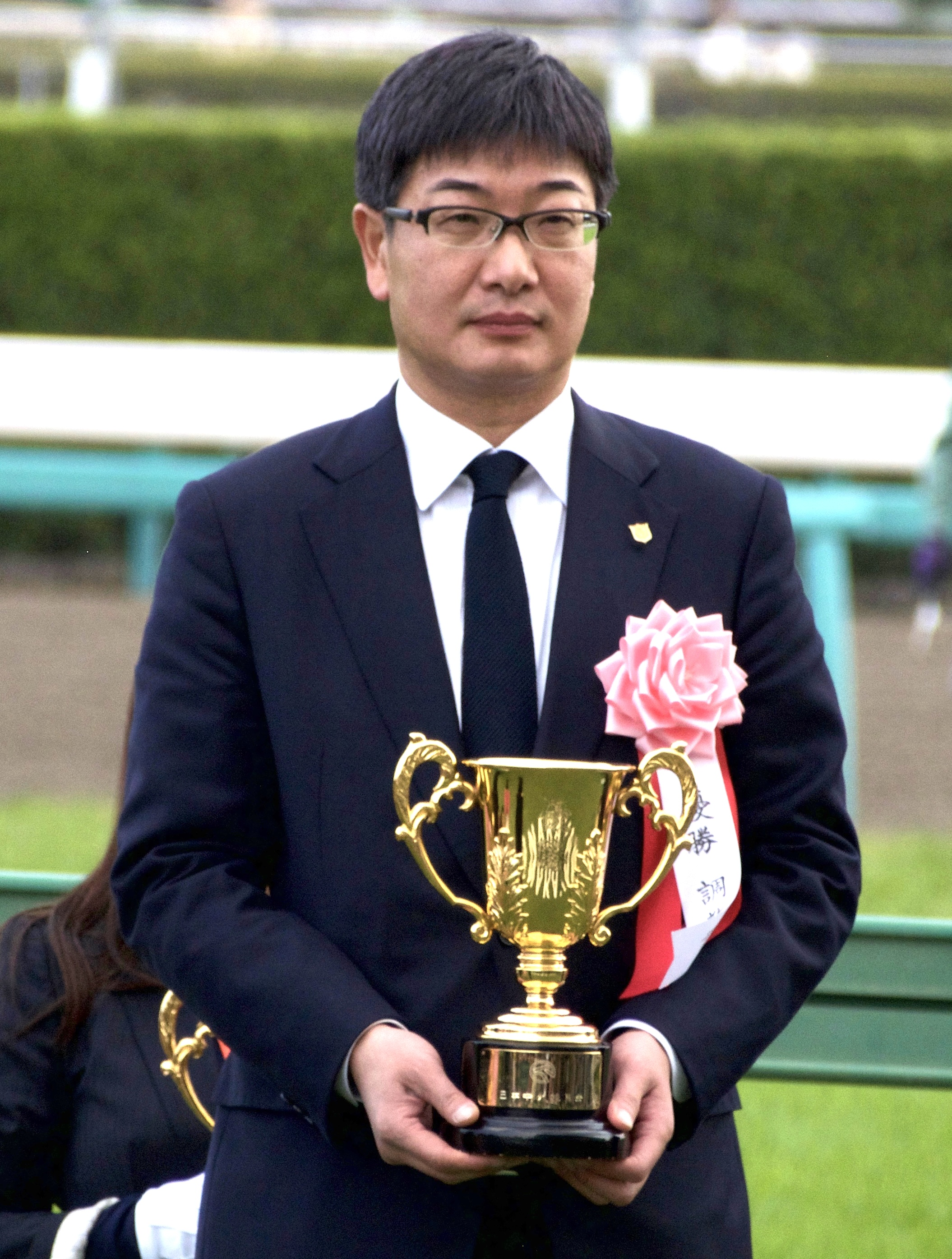
- Hori in 2016 (Spring Stakes)

Personal information
- Native name: 堀宣行
- Born: November 9, 1967 (age 58) Ichikawa, Chiba, Japan
- Occupation: Horse trainer

Horse racing career
- Sport: Horse racing

Honors
- JRA Award for Best Trainer (winning average) (2011, 2015, 2016); JRA Award for Best Trainer (races won) (2015); JRA Award for Best Trainer (money earned) (2016); JRA Award for Best Trainer (technique) (2016, 2017)

Significant horses
- Kinshasa no Kiseki, Jaguar Mail, Strong Return, Real Impact, Maurice, Duramente, Satono Crown, Neo Realism, Salios, Cafe Pharoah, Tastiera, Satono Reve

Noriyuki Hori (堀宣行, born November 9, 1967) is a Japanese racehorse trainer.

== Career ==
Hori first became involved with horses when he took up a part-time job taking care of the lead ponies at Nakayama Racecourse while he was a student at the College of Commerce of Nihon University. After graduating, he was involved in the accounting sector of Kandenko before quitting in 1991 to become a groom. He first became a groom at Tomizo Suwa's stable before becoming an assistant trainer at Yoshitaka Ninomiya's stable and earning his trainer license in 2002.

Hori opened his stable at the Miho Training Center in 2003, with his first win being with Mr Tadahiro at a maiden race at Tokyo Racecourse on May 17 of that year.

Hori won his first graded race when he won the Hakodate Sprint Stakes with Venus Line in 2006.

Hori won his 100th JRA race on January 5, 2008, when Scarlet Line won a maiden race held at Nakayama Racecourse.

Hori won his first Grade I race when he won the Takamatsunomiya Kinen with Kinshasa no Kiseki.

On May 22, 2011, Hori won his 200th JRA race win when he won a maiden race with Premium Race. That same year, Hori was awarded the JRA Award for the Best Trainer in terms of winning averages.

On September 8, 2013, Hori won his 300th JRA race at the Keisei Hai Autumn Handicap, of which he won with Excellente Cave.

In 2015, Hori won two of the three legs of the Triple Crown, the Satsuki Shō and Tōkyō Yūshun, with Duramente. That same year, Maurice, another horse that Hori trained, was named the JRA Horse of the Year and the Best Sprinter or Miler after the horse won the Yasuda Kinen, Mile Championship, and the Hong Kong Mile. Hori himself was named the Best Trainer in terms of both won races and winning averages. He also won his 400th JRA race with Campbell Junior when the horse won an allowance race at Nakayama Racecourse.

On March 3, 2018, Hori won his 500th JRA race when he won an allowance race at Nakayama Racecourse with L'Oeuf Or.

On January 19, 2020, Hori won his 600th JRA race when Luftstorm won his maiden race at Nakayama Racecourse.

On October 9, 2022, Hori won his 700th JRA race when Salios won the Mainichi Ōkan.

On December 28, 2024, Hori won his 800th JRA race when Appassimento won a maiden race at Nakayama Racecourse.

On July 27, 2025, Hori became the seventh trainer ever to win a graded race in all 10 JRA racecourses when he won the Sekiya Kinen with Kana Tape.

== Major wins ==
Japan

- Asahi Hai Futurity Stakes - (1) - Salios (2019)
- February Stakes - (2) - Cafe Pharoah (2021, 2022)
- Mile Championship - (1) - Maurice (2015)
- Mile Championship Nambu Hai - (1) - Cafe Pharaoh (2022)
- Satsuki Shō - (1) - Duramente (2015)
- Takamatsunomiya Kinen - (4) - Kinshasa no Kiseki (2010, 2011), Satono Reve (2025, 2026)
- Takarazuka Kinen - (1) - Satono Crown (2017)
- Tennō Shō (Autumn) - (1) - Maurice (2016)
- Tennō Shō (Spring) - (1) - Jaguar Mail (2010)
- Tōkyō Yūshun - (2) - Duramente (2015), Tastiera (2023)
- Yasuda Kinen - (3) - Real Impact (2011), Strong Return (2012), Maurice (2015)

Australia

- George Ryder Stakes - (1) - Real Impact (2015)

Hong Kong

- Champions Mile - (1) - Maurice (2016)
- Hong Kong Cup - (1) - Maurice (2016)
- Hong Kong Mile - (1) - Maurice (2015)
- Hong Kong Vase - (1) - Satono Crown (2016)
- Queen Elizabeth II Cup - (2) - Neo Realism (2017), Tastiera (2025)
