= CBC Sho =

Horse race in Aichi, Japan

CBC Sho CBC賞
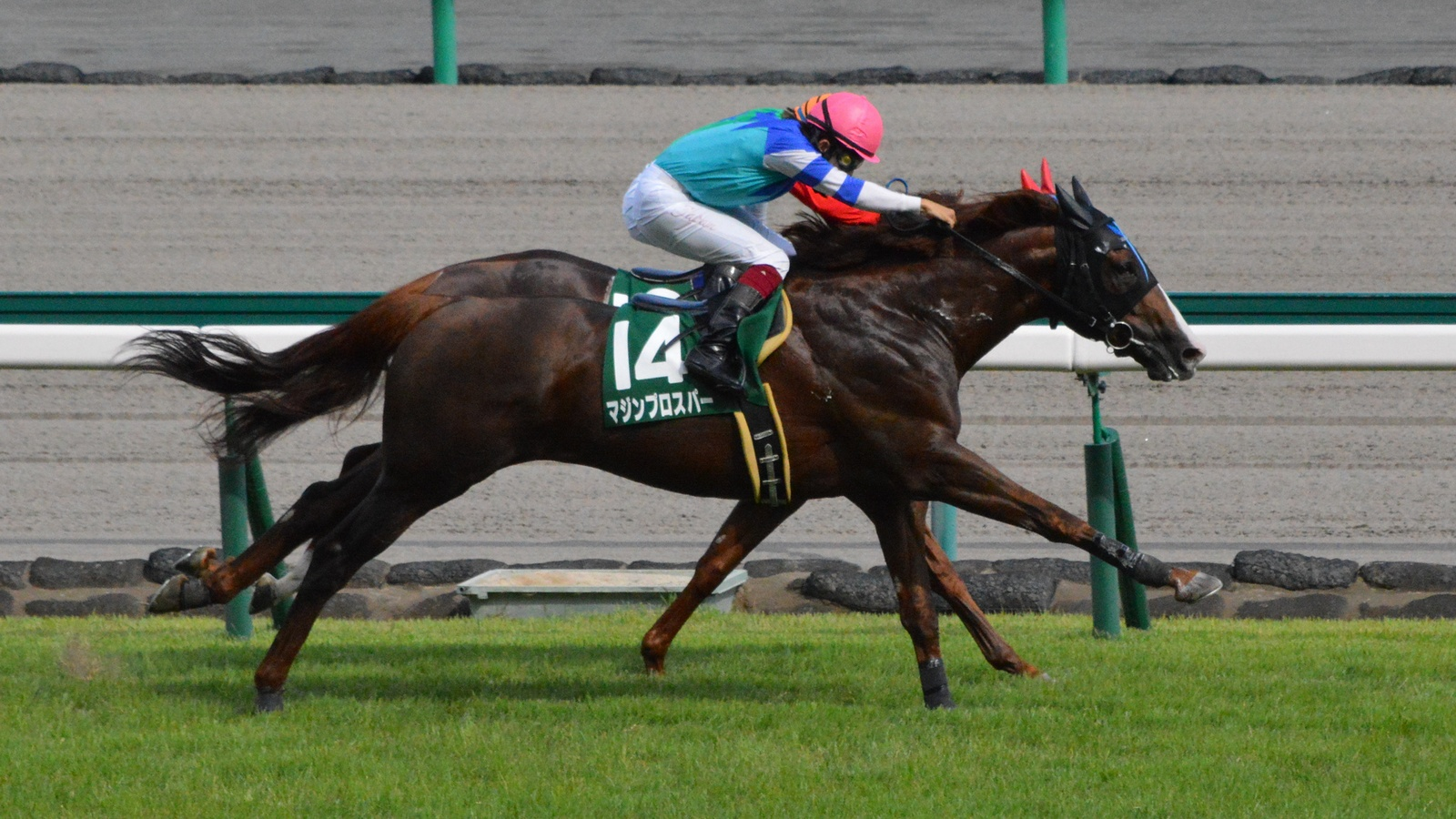
- Majin Prosper wins the 2013 CBC Sho
- Class: Grade 3
- Location: Chukyo Racecourse
- Inaugurated: 1965
- Race type: Thoroughbred Flat racing

Race information
- Distance: 1200 metres
- Surface: Turf
- Track: Left-handed
- Qualification: 3-y-o+
- Weight: Handicap
- Purse: ¥ 87,960,000 (as of 2025): 1st: ¥ 41,000,000; 2nd: ¥ 16,000,000; 3rd: ¥ 10,000,000

The CBC Sho (Japanese CBC賞) is a Grade 3 horse race for Thoroughbreds aged three and over, run in late June or early July over a distance of 1200 metres on turf at Chukyo Racecourse.

It was first run over the current distance in 1965. With the introduction of grading system, the race was rated as a Grade 3 race in 1984, elevated to Grade 2 status in 1990, and downgraded to Grade 3 status in 2006. The race was originally run over 1800 metres the distance was cut to 1400 metres in 1971 and again to 1200 metres in 1981. It was run at Kyoto Racecourse in 1993 and 2010, Kokura Racecourse in 1999, 2021, and 2022, and Hanshin Racecourse in 2011 and 2020. The race was historically held in June (1990 - 1995), November (1996 - 1999), and December (2000 - 2011).

== Winners since 2000 ==
Year	Winner	Age	Jockey	Trainer	Owner	Time
2000	Trot Star	4	Masayoshi Ebina	Eiji Nakano	Minoru Takano	1:07.9
2001	Rikiai Tokan	3	Taisei Yamada	Masahiro Matsuda	Yukio Takayama	1:09.1
2002	Sunningdale	3	Kenichi Ikezoe	Tsutomu Setoguchi	Shigeki Goto	1:08.4
2003	She Is Tosho	3	Mitsuaki Ando	Akio Tsurudome	Tosho Sangyo	1:08.5
2004	Precious Cafe	5	Masayoshi Ebina	Futoshi Kojima	Kiyoshi Nishikawa	1:08.2
2005	Symboli Gran	3	Davy Bonilla	Yoshihiro Hatakeyama	Symboli Stud	1:08.7
2006	She Is Tosho	6	Kenichi Ikezoe	Akio Tsurudome	Shigeki Goto	1:09.0
2007	Black Bar Spin	4	Hirofumi Shii	Takahisa Tezuka	Yoshio Fujita	1:09.1
2008	Sleepless Night	4	Hiroyuki Uemura	Kojiro Hashiguchi	Sunday Racing	1:08.0
2009	Premium Box	6	Ryota Sameshima	Hiroyuki Uehara	Shadai Race Horse	1:08.0
2010^{[a]}	Headliner	6	Hideaki Miyuki	Masato Nishizono	Shadai Race Horse	1:08.9
2011^{[b]}	Dasher Go Go	4	Norihiro Yokoyama	Takayuki Yasuda	Shin Ashida	1:08.1
2012	Majin Prosper	5	Suguru Hamanaka	Hidemasa Nakao	Kazuhiro Sasaki	1:08.7
2013	Majin Prosper	6	Yuichi Fukunaga	Hidemasa Nakao	Kazuhiro Sasaki	1:08.0
2014	Toho Amapola	5	Yuichi Fukunaga	Ryo Takahashi	Toho Bussan	1:08.6
2015	Uliuli	5	Yasunari Iwata	Hideaki Fujiwara	Kaneko Makoto Holdings	1:09.1
2016	Red Falx	5	Mirco Demuro	Tomohito Ozeki	Tokyo Horse Racing	1:07.2
2017	Shining Lei	5	Yuichi Kitamura	Tomokazu Takano	Carrot Farm	1:08.0
2018	Ares Barows	6	Yuga Kawada	Koichi Tsunoda	Koji Inokuma	1:07.0
2019	Red En Ciel	5	Yuichi Fukunaga	Yasushi Shono	Tokyo Horse Racing	1:09.8
2020^{[b]}	Love Kampf	5	Arata Saito	Naoyuki Morita	Yoichi Masuda	1:08.7
2021^{[c]}	First Force	5	Katsuma Sameshima	Masayuki Nishimura	Koji Yasuhara	1:06.0
2022^{[c]}	T M Spada	3	Seina Imamura	Tadao Igarashi	Masatsugu Takezono	1:05.8
2023	Jasper Krone	4	Taisei Danno	Hideyuki Mori	Kazuo Kato	1:07.2
2024	Drop of Light	5	Hideaki Miyuki	Yuichi Fukunaga	Makio Okada	1:07.5
2025	Invincible Papa	4	Daisuke Sasaki	Daishi Ito	Mikako Sakota	1:07.4
2026	From Dusk	6	Yuji Nakai	Hideyuki Mori	Susumu Fujita	1:06.5

^{[a]}The 2010 race ran at Kyoto Racecourse over the same distance.
^{[b]}The 2011 and 2020 race ran at Hanshin Racecourse over the same distance.
^{[c]}The 2021 and 2022 race ran at Kokura Racecourse over the same distance.

== Earlier winners ==
- 1965 - Shogetsu-2
- 1966 - Miss Nihon Pillow
- 1967 - Midori O
- 1968 - Midori Ace
- 1969 - Atlas
- 1970 - Ouja
- 1971 - Erimo Silver
- 1972 - Sugano Homare
- 1973 - Lake Fire
- 1974 - Kei Supako
- 1975 - Aura Miharu
- 1976 - Silver Land
- 1977 - Riki Taiko
- 1978 - Riki Taiko
- 1979 - Yamanin Dandy
- 1980 - Marry Joy
- 1981 - Agnes Venture
- 1982 - Happy Progress
- 1983 - Nihon Pillow Winner
- 1984 - Happy Progress
- 1985 - Nishino Eve
- 1986 - Lead Triple
- 1987 - St Caesar
- 1988 - Toa Falcon
- 1989 - Mystic Star
- 1990 - Passing Shot
- 1991 - Fame of Lass
- 1992 - Yuki Top Run
- 1993 - Toshi Green
- 1994 - Nihon Pillow Prince
- 1995 - Towa Winner
- 1996 - Eishin Washington
- 1997 - Sugino Hayakaze
- 1998 - Masa Lucky
- 1999 - Agnes World

== See also ==
- Horse racing in Japan
- List of Japanese flat horse races
