= Takamatsunomiya Kinen =

Takamatsunomiya Kinen 高松宮記念
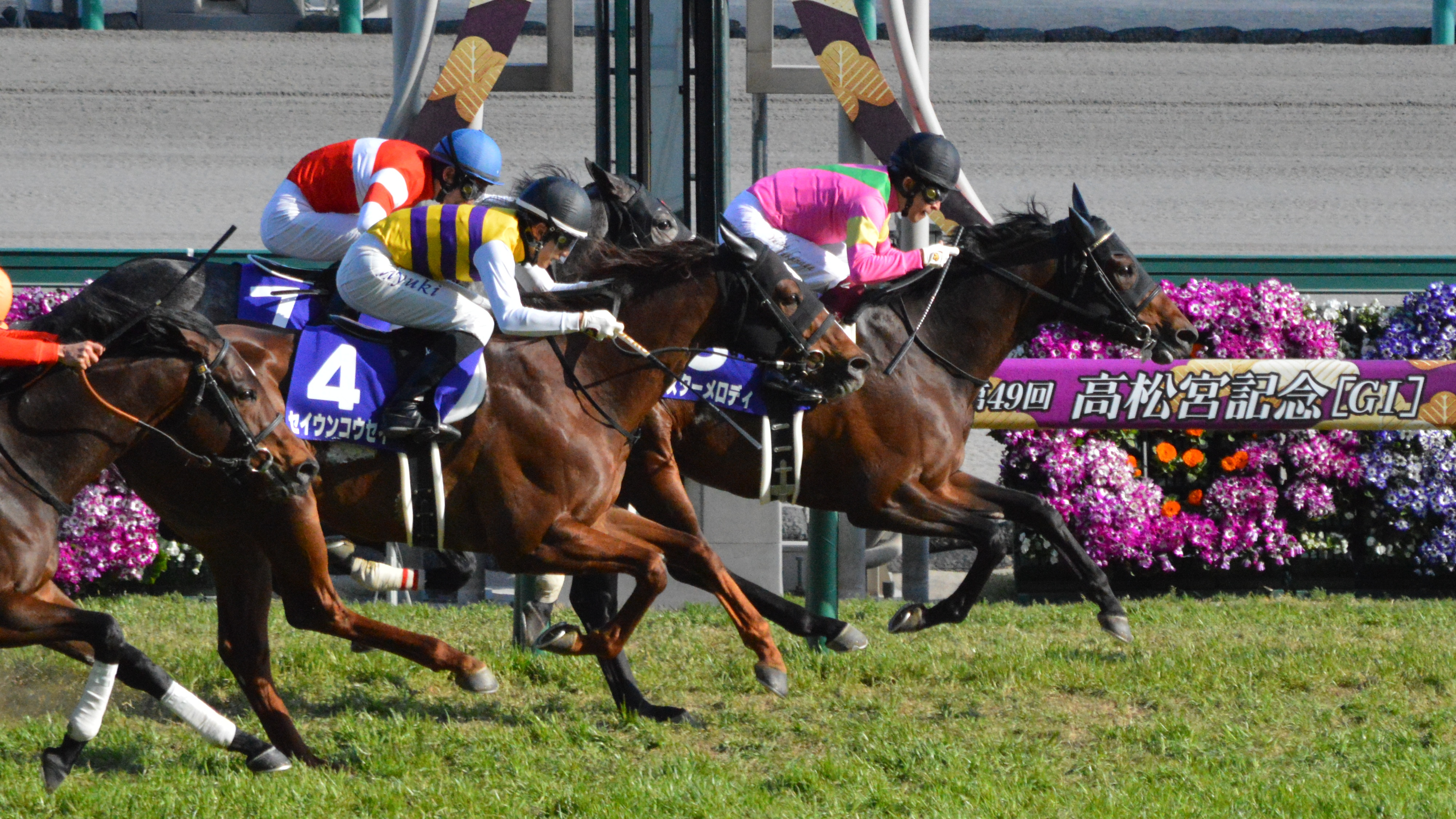
- 2019 Takamatsunomiya Kinen winner Mr Melody
- Class: Grade 1
- Location: Chukyo Racecourse
- Inaugurated: June 27, 1971
- Race type: Thoroughbred
- Website: japanracing.jp

Race information
- Distance: 1200 metres (About 6 furlongs)
- Surface: Turf
- Track: Left-handed
- Qualification: 4-y-o & Up, Thoroughbreds
- Weight: 4-y-o & up 58 kg Allowances; 2 kg for fillies and mares
- Purse: ¥ 367,700,000 (as of 2025): 1st: ¥ 170,000,000; 2nd: ¥ 68,000,000; 3rd: ¥ 43,000,000
- Bonuses: see Global Sprint Challenge

The Takamatsunomiya Kinen (高松宮記念) is a Grade 1 flat horse race in Japan for four-year-old and above thoroughbreds. It is run over a distance of 1,200 metres (approximately 6 furlongs) at Chukyo Racecourse in late March.

The forerunner of this race was the Chukyo Daishoten (中京大賞典). It was started as the Takamatsunomiya Hai (高松宮杯) when the victory cup was designed by Prince Takamatsu in 1971, and was given Domestic Grade 2 status when race grading was introduced to Japan in 1984. At the time, it was run over a distance of 2,000 metres. This was shortened to 1,200 metres and elevated to Domestic Grade 1 in 1996, and to its present level in 2006. Horses trained outside Japan have been eligible to run in the race since 2001. It was renamed the Takamatsunomiya Kinen in 1998 because the family of Prince Takamatsu stopped designing the victory cup.

From 2011, the Takamatsunomiya Kinen has taken over from the Centaur Stakes as one of the Japanese legs of the Global Sprint Challenge Series. It's the second race of the series, preceded by the Lightning Stakes and followed by the Dubai Golden Shaheen.

It is also the only JRA Grade 1 turf race not held at one of the 4 major racecourses (Hanshin, Kyoto, Nakayama, Tokyo).

== Trial races ==
Trial races provide automatic berths to the winning horses.

Race	Grade	Racecourse	Distance	Condition
Hankyu Hai	GIII	Hanshin	1,400 metres	Winner
Ocean Stakes	GIII	Nakayama	1,200 metres	Winner

== Records since 1996 ==
Speed record:

- 1.06.3 – Satono Reve (2026)

Most wins by a horse (2):

- Kinshasa no Kiseki (2010, 2011)
- Satono Reve (2025, 2026)

Most wins by a jockey (3):

- Shinji Fujita (1999, 2002, 2009)
- Yuichi Fukunaga (2004, 2016, 2019)

Most wins by a trainer (4):

- Noriyuki Hori (2010, 2011, 2025, 2026)

Most wins by an owner (2):

- Osamu Yasuda (1997, 1998)
- Kazumi Yoshida (2010, 2011)
- Hajime Satomi (2025, 2026)

== Winners since 1996 ==
Year	Winner	Age	Jockey	Trainer	Owner	Time
Takamatsunomiya Hai (Grade 1)
1996	Flower Park	4	Seiki Tabara	Shouichi Matsumoto	Katsumi Yoshida	1:07.4
1997	Shinko King	6	Yukio Okabe	Kazuo Fujisawa	Osamu Yasuda	1:08.0
Takamatsunomiya Kinen (Grade 1)
1998	Shinko Forest	5	Hirofumi Shii	Hironori Kurita	Osamu Yasuda	1:09.1
1999	Masa Lucky	6	Shinji Fujita	Yutaka Masumoto	Masataka Marui	1:08.0
2000	King Halo	5	Yoshitomi Shibata	Masahiro Sakaguchi	Yoshio Asagawa	1:08.6
2001	Trot Star	5	Masayoshi Ebina	Eiji Nakano	Minoru Takano	1:08.4
2002	Shounan Kamp	4	Shinji Fujita	Hiroyoshi Okubo	Tetsuo Kunimoto	1:08.4
2003	Believe	5	Katsumi Ando	Shigeki Matsumoto	Koji Maeda	1:08.1
2004	Sunningdale	5	Yuichi Fukunaga	Tsutomu Setoguchi	Shigeki Goto	1:07.9
2005	Admire Max	6	Yutaka Take	Mitsuru Hashida	Toshikazu Kondou	1:08.4
2006	Oreha Matteruze	6	Yoshitomi Shibata	Hidetaka Otonashi	Yuuichi Odagiri	1:08.0
2007	Suzuka Phoenix	5	Yutaka Take	Mitsuru Hashida	Keiji Nagai	1:08.9
2008	Fine Grain	5	Hideaki Miyuki	Hiroyuki Nagahama	Shadai Race Horse	1:08.9
2009	Laurel Guerreiro	5	Shinji Fujita	Mitsugu Kon	Laurel Racing	1:08.0
2010	Kinshasa no Kiseki	7	Hirofumi Shii	Noriyuki Hori	Kazumi Yoshida	1:08.6
2011	Kinshasa no Kiseki*	8	Umberto Rispoli	Noriyuki Hori	Kazumi Yoshida	1:07.9
2012	Curren Chan	5	Kenichi Ikezoe	Takayuki Yasuda	Takashi Suzuki	1:10.3
2013	Lord Kanaloa	5	Yasunari Iwata	Takayuki Yasuda	Lord Horse Club	1:08.1
2014	Copano Richard	4	Mirco Demuro	Toru Miya	Sachiaki Kobayashi	1:12.2
2015	Aerovelocity	7	Zac Purton	Paul O'Sullivan	Daniel Yeung Ngai	1:08.5
2016	Big Arthur	5	Yuichi Fukanaga	Kenichi Fujioka	Akira Nakatsuji	1:06.7
2017	Seiun Kosei	4	Hideaki Miyuki	Hiroyuki Uehara	Shigeyuki Nishiyama	1:08.7
2018	Fine Needle	5	Yuga Kawada	Yoshitada Takahashi	Godolphin	1:08.5
2019	Mr Melody	4	Yuichi Fukunaga	Hideaki Fujiwara	Green Fields Co. Ltd.	1:07.3
2020	Mozu Superflare	5	Fuma Matsuwaka	Hidetaka Otonashi	Capital System Co. Ltd.	1:08.7
2021	Danon Smash	6	Yuga Kawada	Takayuki Yasuda	Danox Co. Ltd.	1:09.2
2022	Naran Huleg	6	Kyosuke Maruta	Yoshitada Munakata	Katsushige Muraki	1:08.3
2023	First Force	7	Taisei Danno	Masayuki Nishimura	Koji Yasuhara	1:11.5
2024	Mad Cool	5	Ryusei Sakai	Manabu Ikezoe	Sunday Racing Co. Ltd.	1:08.9
2025	Satono Reve	6	João Moreira	Noriyuki Hori	Hajime Satomi	1:07.9
2026	Satono Reve	7	Christophe Lemaire	Noriyuki Hori	Hajime Satomi	1:06.3

* The 2011 race took place at Hanshin Racecourse.

== Past winners ==
- 1971: Shunsakuo
- 1972: Josetsu
- 1973: Takeden Bird
- 1974: Haiseiko
- 1975: Itto
- 1976: Fujino Parthia
- 1977: Tosho Boy
- 1978: Yamanin Goro
- 1979: Nehai Jet
- 1980: Lindo Pleben
- 1981: Hagino Top Lady
- 1982: Kazushige
- 1983: Hagino Kamui O
- 1984: Kyoei Rare
- 1985: Mejiro Mont Cenis
- 1986: Rugby Ball
- 1987: Land Hiryu
- 1988: Oguri Cap
- 1989: Mejiro Ardan
- 1990: Bamboo Memory
- 1991: Daitaku Helios
- 1992: Mr. Spain
- 1993: Longchamp Boy
- 1994: Nice Nature
- 1995: Matikanetannhauser

== See also ==
- Horse racing in Japan
- List of Japanese flat horse races
