= Kokura Racecourse =

Horse racecourse in Kitakyushu, Fukuoka, Japan

Kokura Racecourse 小倉競馬場
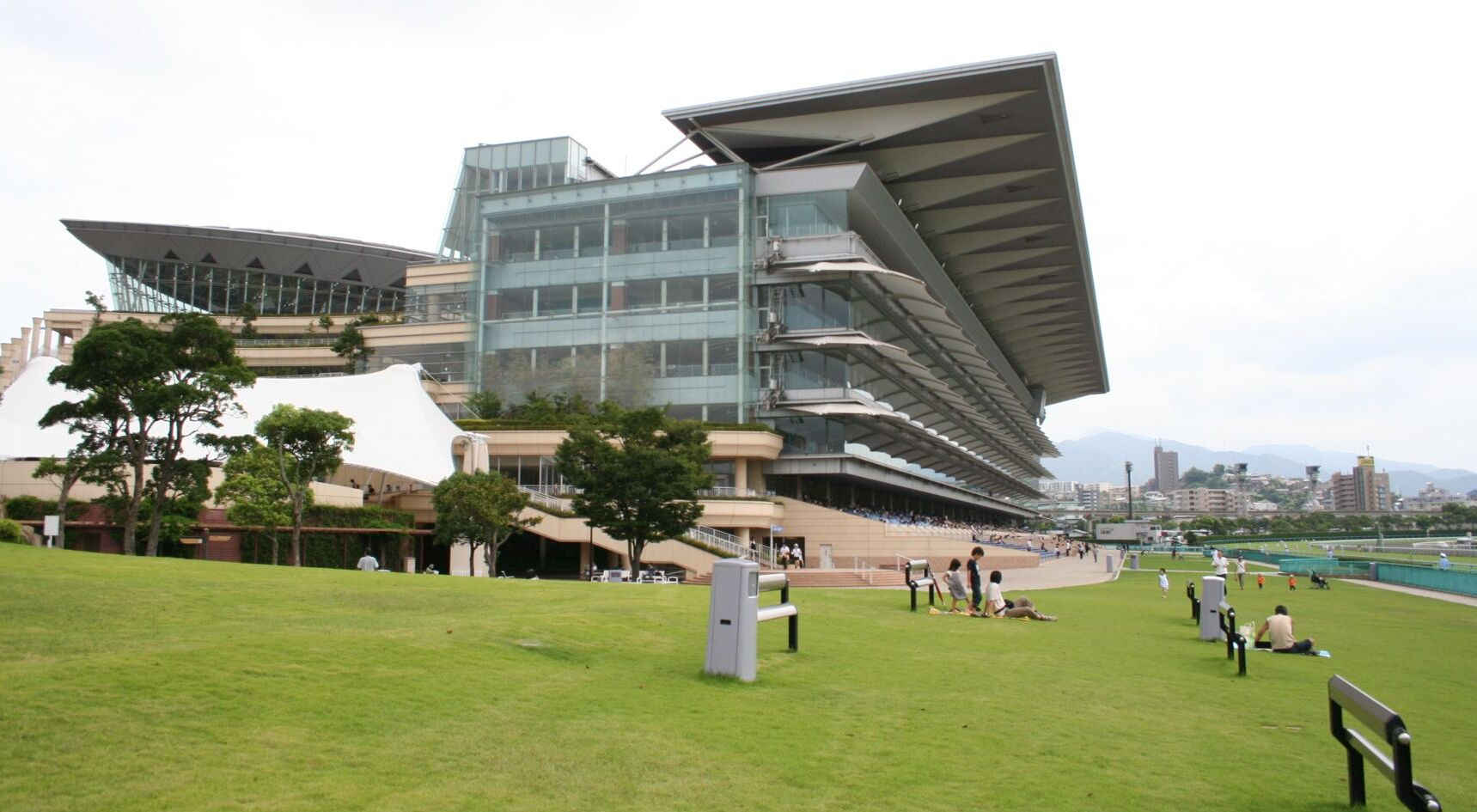
- Kokura Racecourse Grandstand
- Interactive map of Kokura Racecourse 小倉競馬場
- Location: Kitakyushu, Fukuoka, Japan
- Coordinates: 33°50′34.8″N 130°52′21.9″E
- Owned by: Japan Racing Association
- Date opened: 1994
- Race type: Thoroughbred - Flat racing
- Notable races: Kokura Daishoten (Jpn3)

Kokura Racecourse (小倉競馬場, Kokura-keibajō) is located in Kokura Minami-ku Kitakyushu, Japan. It is used for horse racing. It was built in 1994. It has a capacity of 20,000, including 1,192 seats.

== Physical attributes ==
Kokura Racecourse has grass courses and a dirt course.

The turf measures 1615m (1 mile + 19 feet). 1000m, 1200m, 1700m, 1800m, 2000m, and 2600m races are run on the oval.

The dirt course measures 1445 meters (7/8 mile + 310 feet). 1000m, 1700m, and 2400m are races run on the oval.

== Notable races ==
Month	Race	Distance	Age/Sex
Grade III
Jan.	Kokura Himba Stakes (Handicap)	Turf 2000m	4yo + f
Feb.	Kokura Daishoten (Handicap)	Turf 1800m	4yo +
Sep.	Kokura Kinen (Handicap)	Turf 2000m	3yo +
Aug.	Kitakyushu Kinen (Handicap)	Turf 1200m	3yo +
Sep.	Kokura Nisai Stakes	Turf 1200m	2yo
J-Grade III (Steeplechase)
Jul.	Kokura Summer Jump	Turf 3390m	3yo +

== Track records ==
Source：レコードタイム表 (Record time table) -> 小倉競馬場 (Kokura Racecourse)

- † Reference Time.
- Last updated on August 23, 2026.

=== Turf course (2yo) ===
Distance	Time	Racehorse	Sex	Weight	Jockey	Date Recorded
1000m	56.6	Toho Amore	Filly	54kg	Hideaki Miyuki	August 13, 2005
1200m	1:07.5	Freed	Filly	54kg	Yuga Kawada	August 16, 2020
1700m	1:45.2†	Sunny Side Up	Filly	53kg	Teruhiko Chida	November 28, 1999
1800m	1:46.9	Yamanin Magia	Colt	54kg	Yutaka Take	August 4, 2018
2000m	1:59.5	Killer Ability	Colt	54kg	Mirai Iwata	August 28, 2021

=== Turf course (3yo+) ===
Distance	Time	Racehorse	Sex	Weight	Jockey	Date Recorded
1000m	56.6	Sunday Mitchi	Filly 3	53kg	Yuichi Fukunaga	July 15, 2000
1200m	1:05.8	T M Spada	Filly 3	48kg	Seina Imamura	July 3, 2022
1700m	1:39.5	Salacia	Filly 3	52kg	Yuichi Kitamura	August 5, 2018
1800m	1:43.8	Escola	Colt 3	56kg	Yuga Kawada	July 3, 2021
2000m	1:56.8	Gaia Force	Colt 3	54kg	Kohei Matsuyama	July 3, 2022
2600m	2:36.4	Silky Voice	Colt 4	57kg	Yuga Kawada	July 2, 2022

=== Dirt course (2yo) ===
Distance	Time	Racehorse	Sex	Weight	Jockey	Date Recorded
1000m	57.2	American Bikini	Filly	52kg	Seinosuke Yoshimura	July 13, 2024
1700m	1:44.3	Yamanin Ours	Colt	50kg	Seina Imamura	August 20, 2022

=== Dirt course (3yo+) ===
Distance	Time	Racehorse	Sex	Weight	Jockey	Date Recorded
1000m	56.7	Rose Charis	Filly 3	53kg	Kanta Taguchi	July 4, 2026
1700m	1:40.9	Meisho Kazusa	Horse 5	56kg	Kohei Matsuyama	July 11, 2021
2400m	2:30.1	Classical Nova	Colt 3	55kg	Hayato Yoshida	December 3, 2011
