= Kitakyushu Kinen =

Japanese thoroughbred race

Kitakyushu Kinen 北九州記念
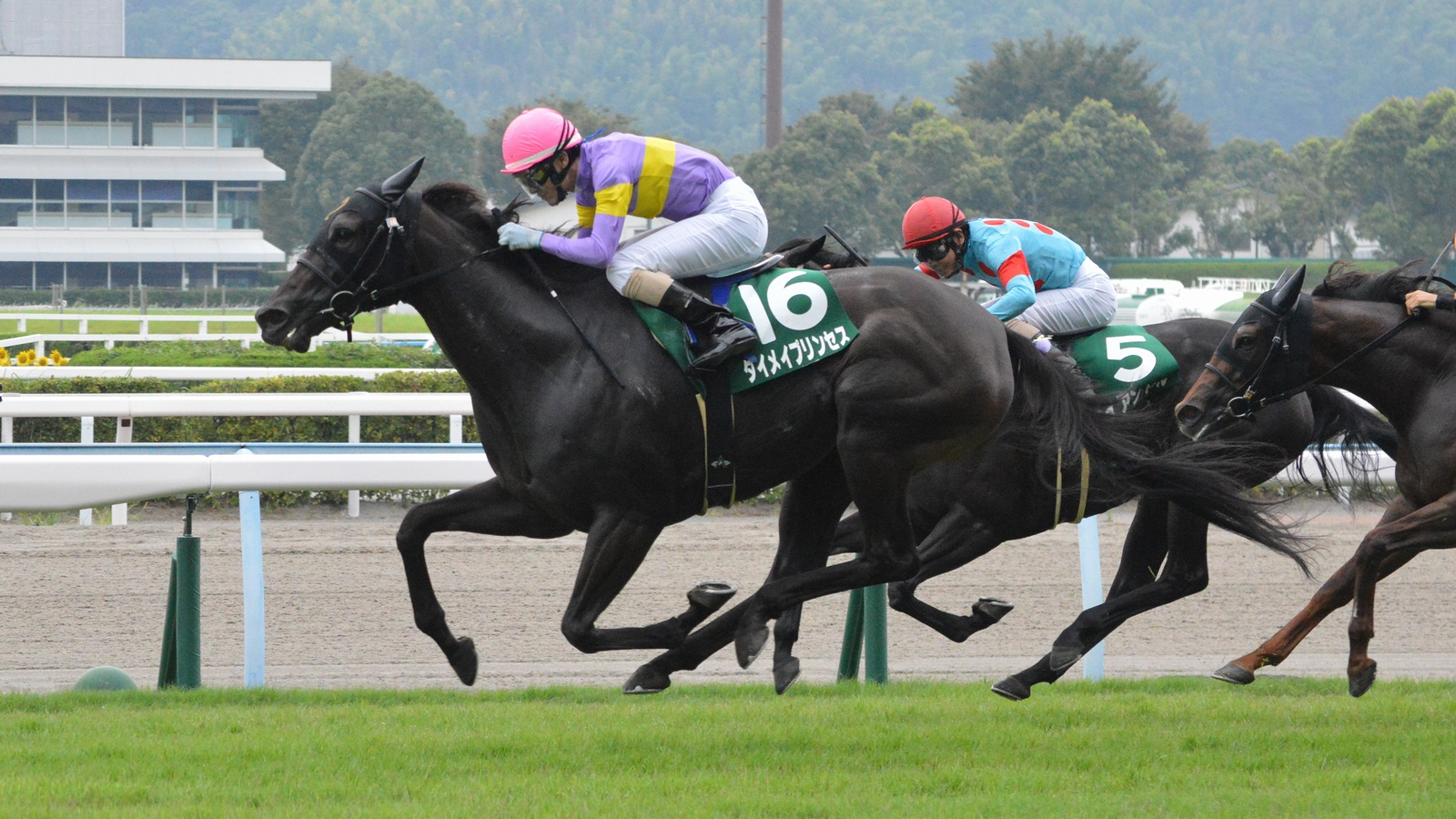
- 2019 Kitakyushu Kinen winner Daimei Princess
- Class: Grade 3
- Location: Kokura Racecourse, Fukuoka Prefecture, Japan
- Inaugurated: 1966
- Race type: Thoroughbred – Flat racing

Race information
- Distance: 1,200 meters
- Surface: Turf
- Track: Right-handed (inner course)
- Weight: Handicap
- Purse: ¥ 87,960,000 (as of 2025): 1st: ¥ 41,000,000; 2nd: ¥ 16,000,000; 3rd: ¥ 10,000,000

The Kitakyushu Kinen (Japanese: 北九州記念), short for TV Nishinippon Corp. Sho Kitakyushu Kinen, is a Grade III Handicap race in Japan for horses in the JRA.

== Race details ==
The first race was held in 1966.

The race is usually held in August, though in the past, they have been run in July.

Foreign horses are allowed to run, with up to 9 foreign horses at a time being allowed to run.

There are no weight limits.

== Winners since 2014 ==
Year	Winner	Age	Jockey	Trainer	Owner	Time
2014	Little Gerda	5	Kyosuke Maruta	Ippo Samushima	Ryoko Kuriyama	1:07.5
2015	Bel Canto	4	Yutaka Take	Koichi Tsunoda	Koji Maeda	1:07.3
2016	Bakushin Teio	7	Kota Fujioka	Hori Noriyuki	Masamichi Hayashi	1:08.5
2017	Diana Halo	4	Yutaka Take	Nobuharu Fukushima	Komahide Co. Ltd.	1:07.5
2018	Ares Barrows	6	Yuji Hishida	Koichi Tsunoda	Koji Inokuma	1:06.6
2019	Daimei Princess	6	Shinichiro Akiyama	Naoyuki Morita	Tokyo Horse Racing	1:08.2
2020	Red En Ciel	6	Yuichi Fukunaga	Yasushi Shono	Koichi Miyamoto	1:07.8
2021	Yoka Yoka	3	Hideaki Miyuki	Kiyoshi Tani	Koji Oka	1:08.2
2022	Buon Voyage	5	Haruhiko Kawasu	Tomoyuki Umeda	Toshihiro Hirosaki	1:07.3
2023	Jasper Krone	4	Taisei Danno	Tomoyuki Umeda	Hideyuki Mori	1:06.9
2024	Puro Magic	3	Kohei Matsuyama	Shogo Yasuda	Three H Racing Co. Ltd.	1:07.9
2025	Yamanin al Rihla	4	Taisei Danno	Takashi Saito	Hajime Doi	1:07.8
2026	Flicker Jab	4	Kohei Matsuyama	Shota Nishizono	West.Forest.Stable Co. Ltd.	1:08.0

== Previous winners ==
- 1966: Hajime Ryu
- 1967: Atlas
- 1968: Hiro Daikoku
- 1969: Ho-un
- 1970: Open Tsubame
- 1971: Okaheren
- 1972: Thai Babo
- 1973: Narutaki Ace
- 1974: Rokko Ichi
- 1975: Fumino Hikari
- 1976: Miyajimarengo
- 1977: Fuji Linden
- 1978: Urakawa Cherry
- 1979: Three Fire
- 1980: Fuji Madonna
- 1981: Lafontaice
- 1982: Omi Shadai
- 1983: Lovely Star
- 1984: Manno Taro
- 1985: Global Dyna
- 1986: Lucky Sea Turtle
- 1987: Mayano Jo O
- 1988: Tagajo O
- 1989: Tanino Suisei
- 1990: Nishi Yamasho
- 1991: Movie Star
- 1992: Nuevo Tosho
- 1993: Silk Moonlight
- 1994: Ibuki Five One
- 1995: Inazuma Takao
- 1996: Magic Kiss
- 1997: Dandy Command
- 1998: Tow Show Orion
- 1999: Eishin Vincennes
- 2000: Tunante
- 2001: Eishin Preston
- 2002: Top Protector
- 2003: Millenium Bio
- 2004: Daitaku Bertram
- 2005: Meisho Kaido
- 2006: Cosmo Fortune
- 2007: Kyowa Roaring
- 2008: Sleepless Night
- 2009: Sandalphon
- 2010: Melissa
- 2011: Tokai Mystery
- 2012: Sugino Endeavor
- 2013: Tsurumaru Leon

== See also ==
- Horse racing in Japan
- List of Japanese flat horse races
