= Ocean Stakes =

Ocean Stakes オーシャンステークス
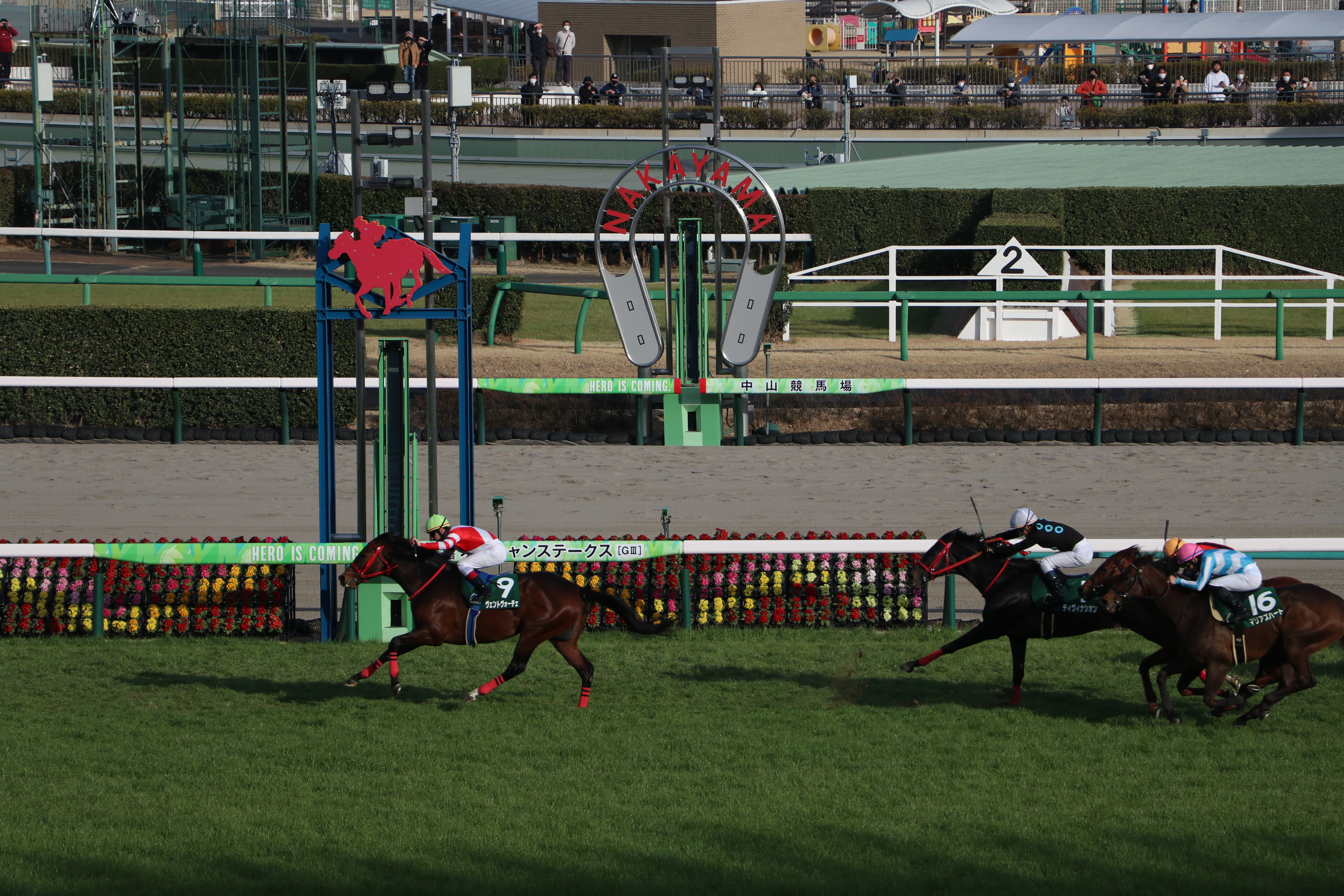
- Vento Voce winning the 2023 Ocean Stakes
- Class: Grade 3
- Location: Nakayama Racecourse
- Inaugurated: 1996
- Race type: Thoroughbred Flat racing

Race information
- Distance: 1200 meters
- Surface: Turf
- Track: Right-handed
- Qualification: 4-y-o+
- Weight: 56 kg, fillies and mares allowed 2 kg
- Purse: ¥ 92,980,000 (as of 2026): 1st: ¥ 43,000,000; 2nd: ¥ 17,000,000; 3rd: ¥ 11,000,000

The Ocean Stakes (Japanese オーシャンステークス) is a Grade 3 horse race organized by Japan Racing Association (JRA) for Thoroughbreds aged four and over. It is run in March over a distance of 1,200 meters on turf at Nakayama Racecourse.

The Ocean Stakes was first run in 1996 at 1,800 meters. The distance was changed to 1,200 meters in 1997 and has held Grade 3 status since 2006. From 2014, the race serves as a trial race for the Takamatsunomiya Kinen.

== Weight ==
57 kg for four-year-olds above.

Allowances:

- 2 kg for fillies / mares
- 1 kg for southern hemisphere bred three-year-olds

Penalties (excluding two-year-old race performance):

- If a graded stakes race has been won within a year:
  - 2 kg for a grade 1 win (1 kg for fillies / mares)
  - 1 kg for a grade 2 win
- If a graded stakes race has been won for more than a year:
  - 1 kg for a grade 1 win

== Winners ==
Year	Winner	Age	Jockey	Trainer	Owner	Time
1996	Meiner Gabe	5	Seiji Ebisawa	Ryuichi Inaba	Thoroughbred Club Ruffian	1:47.0
1997	Cheers Silence	5	Olivier Peslier	Kenji Yamauchi	Kiyoko Kitamura	1:09.3
1998	Shinko Forest	6	Yoshitomi Shibata	Hironori Kurita	Osamu Yasuda	1:09.0
1999	Izumi Success	5	Masaki Katsura	Kazuhiko Hongo	Takeshi Saito	1:09.3
2000	Taiki Bridle	6	Yukio Okabe	Masanori Ito	Taiki Farm	1:09.1
2001	Key Gold	6	Masayoshi Ebina	Toru Miya	Koichiro Kitasaki	1:09.8
2002	Shonan Kampf	4	Yutaka Yoshida	Yokichi Okubo	Tetsuhide Kunimoto	1:07.3
2003	Native Heart	5	Takayuki Ishizaki	Kazuo Oyama	Soryu Ikeda	1:09.7
2004	Silky Lagoon	4	Junichi Kobayashi	Masahiro Ikegami	Silk	1:08.1
2005	Silky Lagoon	5	Yoshitomi Shibata	Masahiro Ikegami	Silk	1:07.9
2006	Native Heart	8	Hiroyuki Uchida	Noboru Sakamoto	Soryu Ikeda	1:08.6
2007	I'll Love Again	5	Masami Matsuoka	Takahisa Tezuka	Yomoji Saito	1:08.2
2008	Premium Box	5	Hayato Yoshida	Hiroyuki Uehara	Shadai Race Horse	1:08.9
2009	Urbanity	5	Norihiro Yokoyama	Masaaki Koga	Shadai Race Horse	1:09.2
2010	Kinshasa no Kiseki	7	Hirofumi Shii	Noriyuki Hori	Kazumi Yoshida	1:09.8
2011	Dasher Go Go	4	Yuga Kawada	Takayuki Yasuda	Shin Ashida	1:07.8
2012	One Carat	6	Yusuke Fujioka	Keichi Fujioka	Yoichi Aoyama	1:09.2
2013	Sakura Gospel	5	Norihiro Yokoyama	Tomohito Ozeki	Sakura Commerce	1:08.5
2014	Smart Orion	4	Norihiro Yokoyama	Yuichi Shikato	Toru Okawa	1:08.9
2015	Sakura Gospel	7	Keita Tosaki	Tomohito Ozeki	Sakura Commerce	1:08.7
2016	A Shin Bullseye	5	Shu Ishibashi	Kenji Nonaka	Eishindo	1:07.5
2017	Melagrana	5	Keita Tosaki	Manabu Ikezoe	Kazumi Yoshida	1:08.3
2018	King Heart	5	Hiroshi Kitamura	Shinobu Hoshino	Yoichi Masuda	1:08.3
2019	Mozu Superflare	4	Christophe Lemaire	Hidetaka Otonashi	Capital Systems	1:07.1
2020	Danon Smash	5	Yuga Kawada	Takayuki Yasuda	Danox	1:07.4
2021	Contra Check	5	Genki Maruyama	Kazuo Fujisawa	Carrot Farm	1:08.4
2022	Gendarme	7	Kiwamu Ogino	Yasutoshi Ikee	Koji Maeda	1:07.9
2023	Vento Voce	6	Christophe Lemaire	Mitsunori Makiura	Eden Association	1:07.4
2024	Toshin Macau	5	Takeshi Yokoyama	Mizuki Takayanagi	Sato Co. Ltd.	1:08.0
2025	Mama Cocha	6	Yuga Kawada	Yasutoshi Ikee	Kaneko Makoto Holdings Co. Ltd.	1:07.1
2026	Pair Pollux	5	Yasunari Iwata	Tomoyuki Umeda	Hirosaki Toshihiro HD Co. Ltd.	1:07.0

== See also ==
- Horse racing in Japan
- List of Japanese flat horse races
