= Hakodate Nisai Stakes =

Hakodate Nisai Stakes 函館2歳ステークス
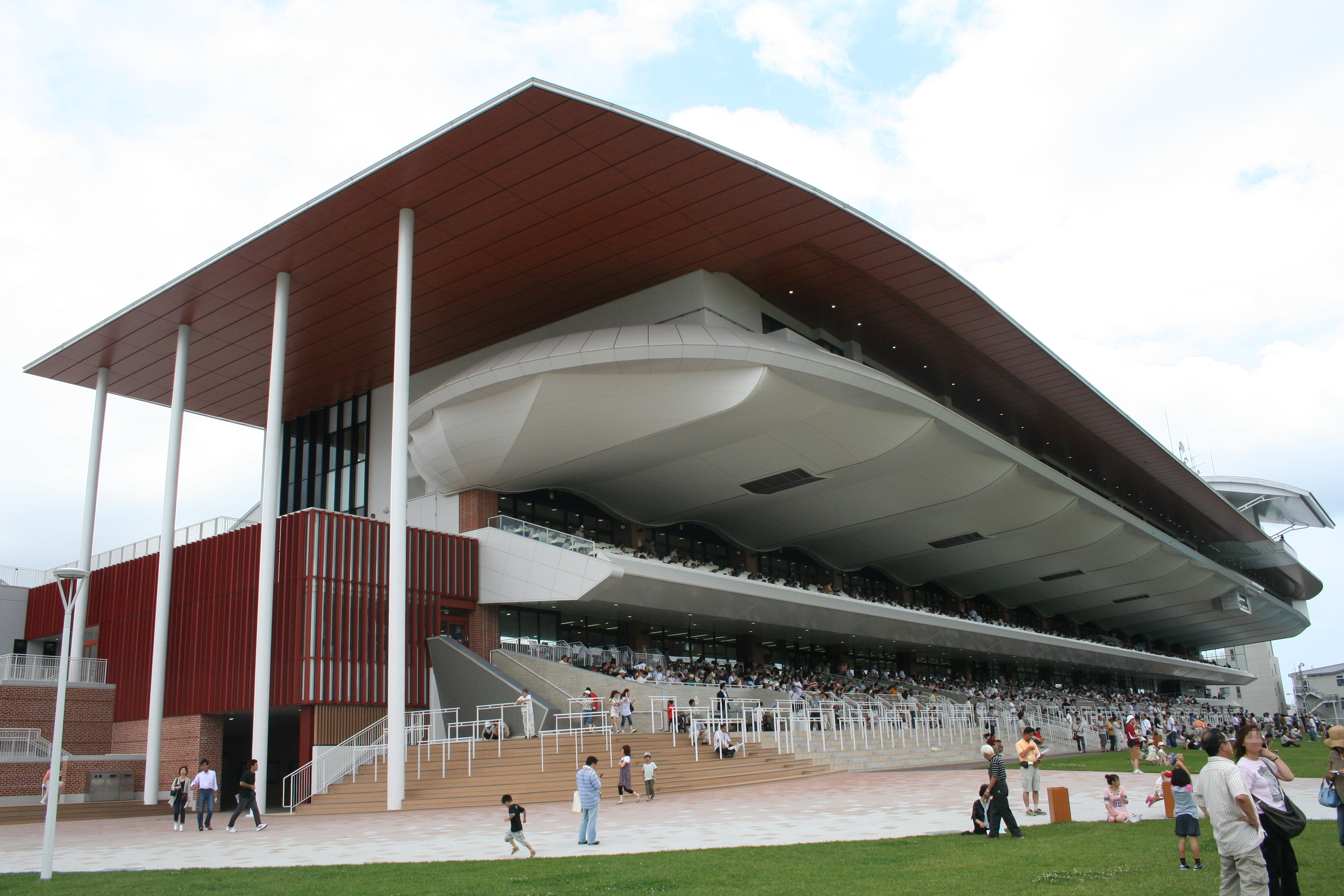
- Hakodate Racecourse
- Class: Grade 3
- Location: Hakodate Racecourse
- Inaugurated: 1969
- Race type: Thoroughbred Flat racing

Race information
- Distance: 1200 metres
- Surface: Turf
- Track: Right-handed
- Qualification: 2-y-o
- Weight: 55 kg
- Purse: ¥ 66,860,000 (as of 2025): 1st: ¥ 31,000,000; 2nd: ¥ 12,000,000; 3rd: ¥ 8,000,000

The Hakodate Nisai Stakes (Japanese 函館2歳ステークス) is a Grade 3 horse race for two-year-old Thoroughbreds. It is run in late July over a distance of 1200 metres at Hakodate Racecourse in Hakodate, Japan.

The race was first run in 1969 and was promoted to Grade 3 status in 1984.

== Winners since 1984 ==
Year	Winner	Jockey	Trainer	Owner	Time
1984	Erebus	Takayuki Kito	Hisao Hisatsune	Yasuo Obata	1:10.5
1985	Dyna Actress	Shinji Azuma	Susumu Yano	Shadai Race Horse	1:10.3
1986	Hokuto Helios	Masato Shibata	Takao Nakano	Shigeru Mori	1:14.5
1987	Dictator Land	Yoshiyuki Muramoto	Sadaya Sugaya	Shadai Race Horse	1:12.2
1988	Southern Venus	Mikio Matsunaga	Hiroki Sakiyama	Shigetoshi MInami	1:11.2
1989	Daiichi Oishi	Shigetoshi Saruhashi	Yoshio Oki	Haruo Tsujimoto	1:12.3
1990	Milford Slew	Norihiro Yokoyama	Kotaro Tanaka	Kiyoshi Noritake	1:12.7
1991	Atom Pit	Koichi Uchida	Yasuo Ikee	Tadaharu Morimoto	1:13.7
1992	Mother Tosho	Norihiro Yokoyama	Shinji Okuhira	Tosho Sangyo	1:13.5
1993	Marry God	Yoshikazu Yokoyama	Shinji Okuhira	Yutaro Suzuki	1:14.1
1994	Dantsu Dancer^{[a]}	Shinji Fujita	Kenji Yamauchi	Tetsuji Yamamoto	1:00.0
1995	Proud Man	Hiroaki Kiyoyama	Hitoshi Nakamura	Shigeru Yoshida	1:11.5
1996	Meiner Max	Tetsuzo Sato	Hitoshi Nakamura	Thoroughbred Club Ruffian	1:10.7
1997	Agnes World	Yutaka Take	Hideyuki Mori	Takao Watanabe	1:09.8
1998	Reserve Your Heart	Norihiro Yokoyama	Toshiaki Shirai	Koji Maeda	1:11.1
1999	Angel Caro	Toshihiko Inoue	Masao Hayashi	Minpei Shirai	1:11.3
2000	Meiner Japan	Hirofumi Shii	Shozo Sasaki	Thoroughbred Club Ruffian	1:10.6
2001	Sadamu Blue Sky	Mikio Matsunaga	Hitoshi Nakamura	Sada Onishi	1:11.1
2002	Atago Taisho	Takanori Kikuzawa	Kiyoshi Hagiwara	Wahei Tsubonoya	1:11.5
2003	Fille de Reve	Shinji Fujita	Kanji Yamauchi	Laurel Racing	1:12.2
2004	Ambroise	Douglas Whyte	Futoshi Kojima	Sunday Racing	1:10.4
2005	Moere Genius	Fuyuki Igarashi	Yoshinori Doyama	Kazuo Nakamura	1:10.7
2006	Nishino Charmy	Hirofumi Shii	Hidekazu Asami	Shigeyuki Nishiyama	1:10.3
2007	Heart of Queen	Koshiro Take	Takahiro Mizuno	Takasumi Takizawa	1:13.8
2008	Fifth Petal	Kousei Miura	Yukihiro Kato	Carrot Farm	1:10.7
2009	Stellar Lead^{[b]}	Yasunari Iwata	Hideyuki Mori	Hiroo Racing	1:09.7
2010	Magical Pocket	Katsumi Ando	Masazo Ryoke	Genichiro Sakakibara	1:11.2
2011	Fine Choice	Hiroyuki Uemura	Masazo Ryoke	Junzo Miyagawa	1:10.8
2012	Stalk and Ray	Shinji Kawashima	Kenji Yamauchi	Shigeru Honma	1:10.4
2013	Xmas	Genki Maruyama	Makoto Saito	Kenichi Morita	1:09.6
2014	Active Minoru	Kota Fujioka	Yoshihito Kitade	Minoru Yoshioka	1:10.2
2015	Blanc Bonheur	Yasunari Iwata	Kazuya Nakatake	Yoko Maeda	1:10.6
2016	Levante Lion	Kousei Miura	Yoshito Yahagi	Lion Race Horse	1:09.2
2017	Cassius^{[c]}	Suguru Hamanaka	Hisashi Shimizu	Kanayama Holdings	1:10.0
2018	Aster Pegasus	Ryoya Kozaki	Kazuya Nakatake	Hisae Kato	1:09.4
2019	Bien Fait	Yusuke Fujioka	Kazuya Nakatake	Koki Maeda	1:09.2
2020	Ringoame	Yuji Tannai	Masatatsu Kikukawa	Big Red Farm	1:09.8
2021	Namura Lycoris	Fuma Izumiya	Yuki Ohashi	Nobushige Namura	1:09.9
2022	Bouton d'Or	Katsuma Sameshima	Manabu Ikezoe	Gaen Kogyo	1:11.8
2023	Seltsam	Suguru Hamanaka	Tadashi Kayo	Junzo Miyagawa	1.11.7
2024	Satono Carnaval	Daisuke Sasaki	Noriyuki Hori	Hajime Satomi	1:09.2
2025	A Shin Deed	Rachel King	Ryuji Okubo	Eishindo	1:08.4
2026	Felicita	Kazuo Yokoyama	Takashi Suzuki	Kanayama Holdings Co. Ltd	1:10.4

^{a} The 1994 race was run over 1000 metres on dirt
^{b} The 2009 race was run at Sapporo Racecourse
^{c} The 2017 winner Cassius was exported to Australia and renamed Kemono

== Earlier Winners ==
- 1969 - Tanino Sovereign
- 1970 - Long One
- 1971 - Tomoe O
- 1972 - Takayoshi Taiho
- 1973 - Sakurai Iwai
- 1974 - Hoshi Berge
- 1975 - Inari Bunda
- 1976 - Soun Musashi
- 1977 - Bambton Court
- 1978 - Silksky
- 1979 - Sakura Shingeki
- 1980 - Shin Pillow
- 1981 - Hokuto Flag
- 1982 - Shadai Sophia
- 1983 - Sakura Toko

== See also ==
- Horse racing in Japan
- List of Japanese flat horse races
