= Sekiya Kinen =

Sekiya Kinen 関屋記念
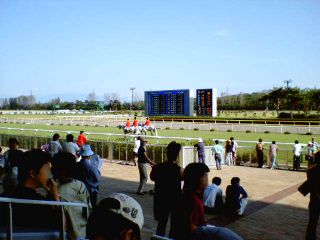
- Niigata Racecourse
- Class: Grade 3
- Location: Niigata Racecourse
- Inaugurated: 1966
- Race type: Thoroughbred Flat racing

Race information
- Distance: 1600 metres
- Surface: Turf
- Track: Left-handed
- Qualification: 3-y-o+
- Weight: 4-y-o+ 56 kg, 3-y-o 53 kg, fillies allowed 2 kg
- Purse: ¥ 87,960,000 (as of 2024): 1st: ¥ 41,000,000; 2nd: ¥ 16,000,000; 3rd: ¥ 10,000,000

The Sekiya Kinen (Japanese 関屋記念) is a Japanese Grade 3 horse race for Thoroughbreds aged three and over. It is run in August over a distance of 1600 metres on turf at Niigata Racecourse, in Kita-ku, Niigata.

The name "Sekiya" is taken from the district the old Niigata Racecourse was located, prior to being relocated to its current location in 1965.

The Sekiya Kinen was first run in 1966 and has held Grade 3 status since 1984. The race distance was 2000 metres before being reduced to 1800 metres in 1970 and to 1600 metres in 1975. The race was run twice at Fukushima Racecourse, over 1200 metres in 1988 and 1700 metres in 2000.

== Weight ==
54 kg for three-year-old, 57 kg for four-year-old and above.

Allowances:

- 2 kg for fillies / mares
- 2 kg for southern hemisphere bred three-year-old

Penalties (excluding two-year-old race performance):

- If a graded stakes race has been won within a year:
  - 3 kg for a grade 1 win (2 kg for fillies / mares)
  - 2 kg for a grade 2 win (1 kg for fillies / mares)
  - 1 kg for a grade 3 win
- If a graded stakes race has been won for more than a year:
  - 2 kg for a grade 1 win (1 kg for fillies / mares)
  - 1 kg for a grade 2 win

== Winners since 2000 ==
Year	Winner	Age	Jockey	Trainer	Owner	Time
2000	Daiwa Texas	7	Hiroshi Kitamura	Sueo Masuzawa	Daiwa Co., ltd	1:43.5
2001	Magnaten	5	Yukio Okabe	Kazuo Fujisawa	Takao Komai	1:31.8
2002	Magnaten	6	Yukio Okabe	Kazuo Fujisawa	Takao Komai	1:31.8
2003	Osumi Cosmo	4	Katsuyoshi Tsuneishi	Tadashi Nakao	Hidenori Yamaji	1:31.8
2004	Blue Eleven	4	Minoru Yoshida	Katsuhiko Sumii	Makoto Kaneko	1:32.3
2005	Sidewinder	7	Yuichi Fukunaga	Shuji Kitahashi	Kyoei Co., Ltd	1:32.3
2006	Camphor Best	7	Teruo Eda	Yoshikatsu Sato	Kiyoharu Okumura	1:32.5
2007	Company	6	Yuichi Fukunaga	Hideataka Otonashi	Hideko Kondo	1:31.8
2008	Maruka Shenck	5	Yuichi Fukunaga	Hiroshi Kawachi	Kawacho Sangyo	1:32.8
2009	Smile Jack	4	Kosei Miura	Satoru Kobiyama	Yomoji Saito	1:32.7
2010	Lets Go Kirishima	5	Hiroshi Kitamura	Shoichi Tenma	Shinichiro Nishimura	1:32.9
2011	Rainbow Pegasus	6	Katsumi Ando	Ippo Sameshima	Toshiharu Yoshimura	1:32.6
2012	Donau Blue	4	Hiroyuki Uchida	Sei Ishizaka	Sunday Racing	1:31.5
2013	Red Spada	7	Hiroshi Kitamura	Kazuo Fujisawa	Tokyo Horse Racing	1:32.5
2014	Clarente	5	Hironobu Tanabe	Kojiro Hahiguchi	Shinji Maeda	1:32.5
2015	Red Arion	5	Haruhiko Kawasu	Kojiro Hahiguchi	Tokyo Horse Racing	1:32.6
2016	Young Man Power	4	Keita Tosaki	Takahisa Tezuka	Juichi Hoshino	1:31.8
2017	Maltese Apogee	5	Tomoharu Bushizawa	Masahiro Horii	Nagako Fujita	1:32.2
2018	Primo Scene	3	Hiroshi Kitamura	Tetsuya Kimura	Silk Racing	1:31.6
2019	Mikki Glory	6	Christophe Lemaire	Sakae Kunieda	Mizuki Noda	1:32.1
2020	Satono Arthur	6	Keita Tosaki	Yasutoshi Ikee	Satomi Horse Company	1:33.1
2021	Lotus Land	4	Hironobu Tanabe	Yasuyuki Tsujino	Kobayashi Eiichi Holdings	1:32.7
2022	Win Carnelian	5	Kosei Miura	Yuichi Shikato	Win	1:33.3
2023	Avverare	5	Keita Tosaki	Tetsuya Kimura	Silk Racing	1:32.1
2024	Tudo de Bom	5	Kohei Matsuyama	Hirofumi Shii	Yoichi Aoyama	1:32.9
2025	Kana Tape	6	Rachel King	Noriyuki Hori	Charles Fipke	1:31.0
2026	Ampadu	5	Mirai Iwata	Tetsuya Kimura	Godolphin	1:32.4

== Earlier winners ==
- 1966 - Seechiyou
- 1967 - Tama Queen
- 1968 - Suzu Hayate
- 1969 - Amanogawa
- 1970 - Higashi Light
- 1971 - Tosho Pit
- 1972 - Passing Goal
- 1973 - San Yoko
- 1974 - Noboru Toko
- 1975 - Five One
- 1976 - Nishiki Ace
- 1977 - Ishino Okan
- 1978 - Bellona Sport
- 1979 - Suzu Hope
- 1980 - Sea Bird Park
- 1981 - Bravi O
- 1982 - Meiji Tiger
- 1983 - World King
- 1984 - Hayate Mig
- 1985 - Takara Steel
- 1986 - Island Goddess
- 1987 - Cool Heart
- 1988 - Hishino Lypheor
- 1989 - Mr Brandy
- 1990 - Makiba Cyclone
- 1991 - Nifty Niece
- 1992 - Sprite Passer
- 1993 - Meiteringer
- 1994 - My Superman
- 1995 - Festive King
- 1996 - Eishin Guymon
- 1997 - Eishin Guymon
- 1998 - Daiwa Texas
- 1999 - Reward Ninfa

== See also ==
- Horse racing in Japan
- List of Japanese flat horse races
