= Win Carnelian =

Japanese Thoroughbred racehorse (foaled 2017)

Win Carnelian; ウインカーネリアン
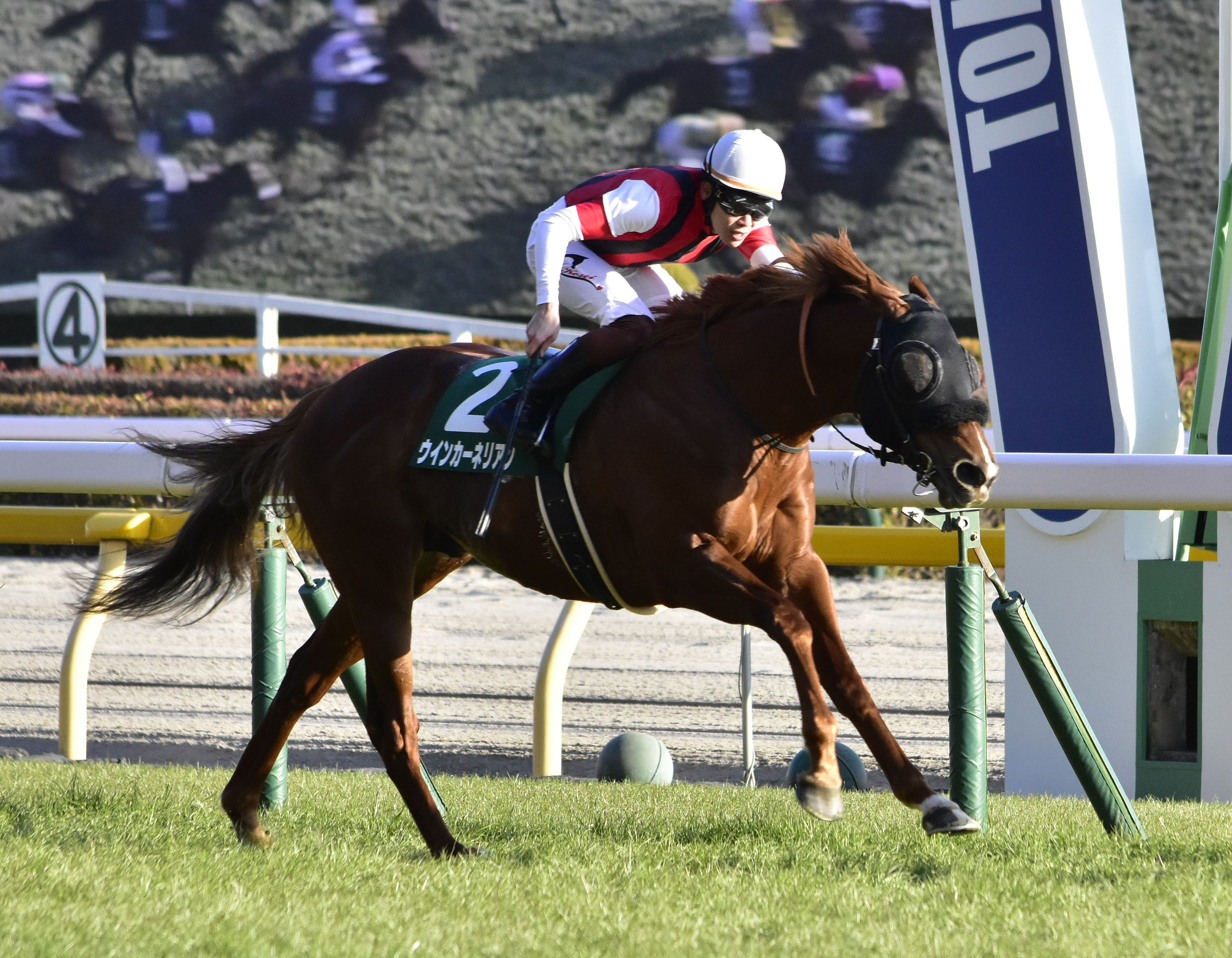
- Win Carnelian after winning the 2023 Tokyo Shimbun Hai
- Breed: Thoroughbred
- Sire: Screen Hero
- Grandsire: Grass Wonder
- Dam: Cosmo Crystal
- Damsire: Meiner Love
- Sex: Stallion
- Foaled: 16 April 2017 (age 9)
- Country: Japan
- Colour: Chestnut
- Breeder: Cosmo View Farm
- Owner: Win Co. Ltd.
- Racing colours
- Trainer: Yūichi Shikato
- Jockey: Kosei Miura
- Record: 37: 9-6-3
- Earnings: ¥574,368,500

Major wins
- Sprinters Stakes (2025); Tokyo Shimbun Hai (2023); Sekiya Kinen (2022)

Win Carnelian (Japanese: ウインカーネリアン, Uin Kānerian; foaled 16 April 2017) is a retired Japanese Thoroughbred racehorse and a stud. He competed from 2019 to 2026, recording nine wins from thirty-seven starts, including the Sprinters Stakes (GI) in 2025, the Tokyo Shimbun Hai (GIII) in 2023, and the Sekiya Kinen (GIII) in 2022. His victory in the 2025 Sprinters Stakes at odds of 50.0 (11th favourite) marked the first JRA GI victory for his jockey Kosei Miura, and his breeder Cosmo View Farm.

== Background ==
Win Carnelian is a chestnut stallion bred in Niikappu, Hokkaido, by Cosmo View Farm. He was sired by Screen Hero, a son of Grass Wonder, and his dam was Cosmo Crystal (コスモクリスタル), a mare by Meiner Love. He is owned by Win Co. Ltd. and was trained by Yuichi Shikato at the JRA's Miho Training Center. His name combines the owner's prefix "Win" with "carnelian," a type of gemstone.

== Racing career ==
=== 2019: two-year-old season ===
Win Carnelian debuted on 9 June 2019 in a maiden race at Tokyo Racecourse, finishing second. He won his maiden on 29 June at Fukushima Racecourse. He finished seventh in the Niigata Nisai Stakes (GIII) on 25 August and second in the Fuyo Stakes on 22 September.

=== 2020: three-year-old season ===
Win Carnelian finished sixth in the St. Paulia Sho and eighth in the Yayoi Sho Deep Impact Kinen (GII). He won a 1-win class race at Nakayama Racecourse on 28 March. On 19 April, he finished fourth in the Satsuki Shō (GI) at odds of 360.0 (17th favourite), securing a spot in the Tōkyō Yūshun. He finished seventeenth in the Tōkyō Yūshun (GI) on 31 May. Returning to allowance races, he won the Ibaraki Shimbun Hai on 4 October and finished fourth in the Joso Stakes on 13 December.

=== 2021: four-year-old season ===
Win Carnelian finished second in the Wakashio Stakes on 10 January and won the Makuhari Stakes on 27 February, gaining open-class status. He was scheduled to run in the Lord Derby Challenge Trophy (GIII) on 3 April but was scratched due to laminitis, which sidelined him for approximately a year.

=== 2022: five-year-old season ===
Returning from his long layoff, Win Carnelian finished sixth in the Rokko Stakes (Listed) on 27 March. He won the Tanigawadake Stakes (Listed) on 7 May and the Yonago Stakes (Listed) on 18 June. On 14 August, he won the Sekiya Kinen (GIII) at Niigata Racecourse, recording his first graded stakes victory. He finished twelfth in the Mile Championship (GI) on 20 November.

=== 2023: six-year-old season ===
Win Carnelian won the Tokyo Shimbun Hai (GIII) on 5 February, holding off a late challenge from Namur. He travelled to the UAE and finished sixth in the Godolphin Mile (G2) at Meydan Racecourse on 25 March. He finished eighth in the Yasuda Kinen (GI) on 4 June and fifth in the Mainichi Okan (GII) on 8 October. He contested the Breeders' Cup Mile (G1) at Santa Anita Park on 4 November, finishing eleventh.

=== 2024: seven-year-old season ===
Win Carnelian finished second in the Tokyo Shimbun Hai (GIII) on 4 February. He finished fourth in the Takamatsunomiya Kinen (GI) on 24 March and fourteenth in the Yasuda Kinen (GI) on 2 June. In autumn, he finished sixth in the Swan Stakes (GII) on 26 October and second in the Keihan Hai (GIII) on 24 November.

=== 2025: eight-year-old season ===
Win Carnelian finished third in the Silk Road Stakes (GIII) on 2 February. He travelled to Meydan and finished second in the Al Quoz Sprint (G1) on 5 April, narrowly missing the win. After finishing fifth in the Keeneland Cup (GIII) on 24 August, he contested the Sprinters Stakes (GI) on 28 September. Starting from the outside post at odds of 50.0 (11th favourite), he engaged in a tight battle with June Blair in the final straight and won by a head, securing his first GI victory. The win was also the first JRA GI victory for his jockey Kosei Miura, his breeder Cosmo View Farm, and his owner Win Co. Ltd (since Win Kluger in 2003). He finished eleventh in the Hong Kong Sprint (G1) at Sha Tin Racecourse on 14 December.

=== 2026: nine-year-old season ===
Win Carnelian remained in training at age nine. He was initially invited to the Al Quoz Sprint in Dubai, but the trip was cancelled due to the 2026 Iran war. He instead targeted the Takamatsunomiya Kinen (GI) on 29 March. Starting as the 7th favourite, he finished third behind Satono Reve and Red Mon Reve, becoming the first nine-year-old horse to place in a JRA flat GI race since records began in 1986. In August, Win Carnelian started in the Keeneland Cup at Sapporo. As the gate opened, Miura propelled him to the lead and nearly snatched the win, but Sound Moryana and Panja Tower surpassed him before the line, and he finished third in his second consecutive race. One month later, he ran in the Sprinters Stakes as the reigning champion. Starting well from the gate, he mingled around sixth position in the early phase. Entering the final straight, he rallied the leaders but gassed out in the last 100 metres and crossed the line in sixth. A week after the race, Kosei Miura who was his main jockey, announced that Win Carnelian would retire from racing altogether and moving into stud duty.

== Statistics ==
The following table details all 37 starts of Win Carnelian's racing career. Record current as of 27 September 2026.

Date	Distance (Condition)	Race	Class	Course	Odds (Favourite)	Field	Finish	Time	Jockey	Winning (Losing) Margin	Winner (2nd Place)	Ref
2019 – two-year-old season
Jun 9	Turf 1800 m (Yielding)	2-Y-O Newcomer	Maiden	Tokyo	6.2 (3rd)	11	2nd	1:51.4	Masami Matsuoka	0.4	Wakea	
Jun 29	Turf 1800 m (Good)	2-Y-O Maiden	Maiden	Fukushima	1.9 (1st)	10	1st	1:49.5	Kosei Miura	–0.1	(Colombe d'Or)	
Aug 25	Turf 1600 m (Good)	Niigata Nisai Stakes	GIII	Niigata	24.9 (6th)	16	7th	1:36.4	Masami Matsuoka	1.4	Woman's Heart	
Sep 22	Turf 2000 m (Good)	Fuyo Stakes	Open	Nakayama	4.0 (3rd)	6	2nd	2:03.3	Masami Matsuoka	0.4	Authority	
2020 – three-year-old season
Feb 2	Turf 1800 m (Good)	St. Paulia Sho	Allowance	Tokyo	10.9 (5th)	13	6th	1:47.6	Masami Matsuoka	0.4	Shonan Hallelujah	
Mar 8	Turf 2000 m (Heavy)	Yayoi Sho Deep Impact Kinen	GII	Nakayama	29.5 (7th)	11	8th	2:04.0	Filip Minarik	1.1	Satono Flag	
Mar 28	Turf 1800 m (Good)	3-Y-O 1-Win	Allowance	Nakayama	4.5 (2nd)	10	1st	1:50.0	Kosei Miura	–0.4	(Sakura Toujours)	
Apr 19	Turf 2000 m (Yielding)	Satsuki Shō	GI	Nakayama	360.0 (17th)	18	4th	2:01.6	Yasunari Tanabe	0.9	Contrail	
May 31	Turf 2400 m (Good)	Tōkyō Yūshun	GI	Tokyo	141.0 (15th)	18	17th	2:26.2	Yasunari Tanabe	2.1	Contrail	
Sep 5	Turf 2000 m (Good)	3-Y-O+ 2-Win	Allowance	Sapporo	2.5 (1st)	16	5th	2:00.9	Takeshi Yokoyama	0.4	Conductress	
Oct 4	Turf 1800 m (Good)	Ibaraki Shimbun Hai	Allowance	Nakayama	4.9 (3rd)	10	1st	1:47.6	Kosei Miura	–0.2	(Le Lien)	
Dec 13	Turf 1800 m (Good)	Joso Stakes	Allowance	Nakayama	2.3 (1st)	11	4th	1:49.3	Kosei Miura	0.0	Rose Amour	
2021 – four-year-old season
Jan 10	Turf 1600 m (Good)	Wakashio Stakes	Allowance	Nakayama	4.9 (2nd)	16	2nd	1:33.4	Kosei Miura	0.5	Karate	
Feb 27	Turf 1600 m (Good)	Makuhari Stakes	Allowance	Nakayama	4.2 (3rd)	16	1st	1:31.8	Kosei Miura	–0.4	(Aim and End)	
Apr 3	Turf 1600 m (Good)	Lord Derby Challenge Trophy	GIII	Nakayama	–	15	SCR	–	Kosei Miura	–	Terzetto	
2022 – five-year-old season
Mar 27	Turf 1600 m (Yielding)	Rokko Stakes	Listed	Hanshin	18.6 (7th)	18	6th	1:34.3	Yusuke Kokubun	0.6	Air Lolonois	
May 7	Turf 1600 m (Good)	Tanigawadake Stakes	Listed	Niigata	3.0 (1st)	11	1st	1:33.6	Kosei Miura	–0.2	(Belenus)	
Jun 18	Turf 1600 m (Good)	Yonago Stakes	Listed	Hanshin	4.0 (1st)	16	1st	1:32.9	Kosei Miura	–0.2	(Kaiser Minoru)	
Aug 14	Turf 1600 m (Yielding)	Sekiya Kinen	GIII	Niigata	3.8 (1st)	14	1st	1:33.3	Kosei Miura	–0.1	(Shuri)	
Nov 20	Turf 1600 m (Good)	Mile Championship	GI	Hanshin	26.0 (9th)	17	12th	1:33.4	Kosei Miura	0.9	Serifos	
2023 – six-year-old season
Feb 5	Turf 1600 m (Good)	Tokyo Shimbun Hai	GIII	Tokyo	9.5 (4th)	16	1st	1:31.8	Kosei Miura	0.0	(Namur)	
Mar 25	Dirt 1600 m (Fast)	Godolphin Mile	G2	Meydan	15.0 (7th)	14	6th	1:37.55	Kosei Miura	1.84	Isolate	
Jun 4	Turf 1600 m (Good)	Yasuda Kinen	GI	Tokyo	54.8 (13th)	18	8th	1:32.1	Kosei Miura	0.7	Songline	
Oct 8	Turf 1800 m (Good)	Mainichi Ōkan	GII	Tokyo	20.4 (5th)	12	5th	1:45.6	Kosei Miura	0.3	Elton Barows	
Nov 4	Turf 1600 m (Firm)	Breeders' Cup Mile	G1	Santa Anita	42.1 (10th)	13	11th	1:33.17	Kosei Miura	0.72	Master of The Seas	
2024 – seven-year-old season
Feb 4	Turf 1600 m (Good)	Tokyo Shimbun Hai	GIII	Tokyo	8.4 (4th)	16	2nd	1:32.3	Kosei Miura	0.2	Sakura Toujours	
Mar 24	Turf 1200 m (Heavy)	Takamatsunomiya Kinen	GI	Chukyo	32.6 (11th)	18	4th	1:09.6	Kosei Miura	0.7	Mad Cool	
Jun 2	Turf 1600 m (Yielding)	Yasuda Kinen	GI	Tokyo	18.9 (9th)	18	14th	1:33.3	Kosei Miura	1.0	Romantic Warrior	
Oct 26	Turf 1400 m (Good)	Swan Stakes	GII	Kyoto	8.1 (4th)	17	6th	1:20.8	Kosei Miura	0.3	Danon McKinley	
Nov 24	Turf 1200 m (Good)	Keihan Hai	GIII	Kyoto	6.6 (3rd)	18	2nd	1:07.8	Kosei Miura	0.1	Big Caesar	
2025 – eight-year-old season
Feb 2	Turf 1200 m (Yielding)	Silk Road Stakes	GIII	Kyoto	8.5 (4th)	16	3rd	1:08.6	Kosei Miura	0.6	Eishin Fencer	
Apr 5	Turf 1200 m (Good)	Al Quoz Sprint	G1	Meydan	50.0 (10th)	11	2nd	1:07.87	Kosei Miura	0.10	Believing	
Aug 24	Turf 1200 m (Good)	Keeneland Cup	GIII	Sapporo	5.4 (1st)	16	5th	1:08.4	Kosei Miura	0.2	Panja Tower	
Sep 28	Turf 1200 m (Good)	Sprinters Stakes	GI	Nakayama	50.0 (11th)	16	1st	1:06.9	Kosei Miura	0.0	(June Blair)	
Dec 14	Turf 1200 m (Good)	Hong Kong Sprint	G1	Sha Tin	25.3 (3rd)	13	11th	1:09.9	Kosei Miura	2.2	Ka Ying Rising	
2026 – nine-year-old season
Mar 29	Turf 1200 m (Good)	Takamatsunomiya Kinen	GI	Chukyo	19.4 (7th)	18	3rd	1:06.6	Kosei Miura	0.3	Satono Reve	
Aug 23	Turf 1200 m (Good)	Keeneland Cup	GIII	Sapporo	9.8 (3rd)	16	3rd	1:08.0	Kosei Miura	0.3	Sound Moryana	
Sep 27	Turf 1200 m (Yielding)	Sprinters Stakes	GI	Nakayama	13.9 (6th)	16	6th	1:09.6	Kosei Miura	0.4	Puro Magic	

== Pedigree ==
Pedigree of Win Carnelian (JPN)
Sire Screen Hero (JPN) 2004	Grass Wonder (USA); 1995	Silver Hawk	Roberto
Sire Screen Hero (JPN) 2004	Grass Wonder (USA); 1995	Silver Hawk	Gris Vitesse
Sire Screen Hero (JPN) 2004	Grass Wonder (USA); 1995	Ameriflora	Danzig
Sire Screen Hero (JPN) 2004	Grass Wonder (USA); 1995	Ameriflora	Graceful Touch
Sire Screen Hero (JPN) 2004	Running Heroine (JPN); 1993	Sunday Silence	Halo
Sire Screen Hero (JPN) 2004	Running Heroine (JPN); 1993	Sunday Silence	Wishing Well
Sire Screen Hero (JPN) 2004	Running Heroine (JPN); 1993	Dyna Actress	Northern Taste
Sire Screen Hero (JPN) 2004	Running Heroine (JPN); 1993	Dyna Actress	Model Sport
Dam Cosmo Crystal (JPN) 2006	Meiner Love (USA); 1995	Seeking the Gold	Mr. Prospector
Dam Cosmo Crystal (JPN) 2006	Meiner Love (USA); 1995	Seeking the Gold	Con Game
Dam Cosmo Crystal (JPN) 2006	Meiner Love (USA); 1995	Heart of Joy	Lyphear
Dam Cosmo Crystal (JPN) 2006	Meiner Love (USA); 1995	Heart of Joy	Mythographer
Dam Cosmo Crystal (JPN) 2006	Christian Name (GB); 1993	Cadeaux Genereux	Young Generation
Dam Cosmo Crystal (JPN) 2006	Christian Name (GB); 1993	Cadeaux Genereux	Smarten Up
Dam Cosmo Crystal (JPN) 2006	Christian Name (GB); 1993	Colorvista	Shirley Heights
Dam Cosmo Crystal (JPN) 2006	Christian Name (GB); 1993	Colorvista	Reprocolor

- Win Carnelian is inbred 5 × 5 to Northern Dancer and 5 × 5 to Hail to Reason.
- His sire Screen Hero won the 2008 Japan Cup.
- His dam Cosmo Crystal is a half-sister to the dams of Opera House and Kayf Tara.

== See also ==
- Thoroughbred racing in Japan
- Sprinters Stakes
