= Keeneland Cup =

Keeneland Cup キーンランドカップ
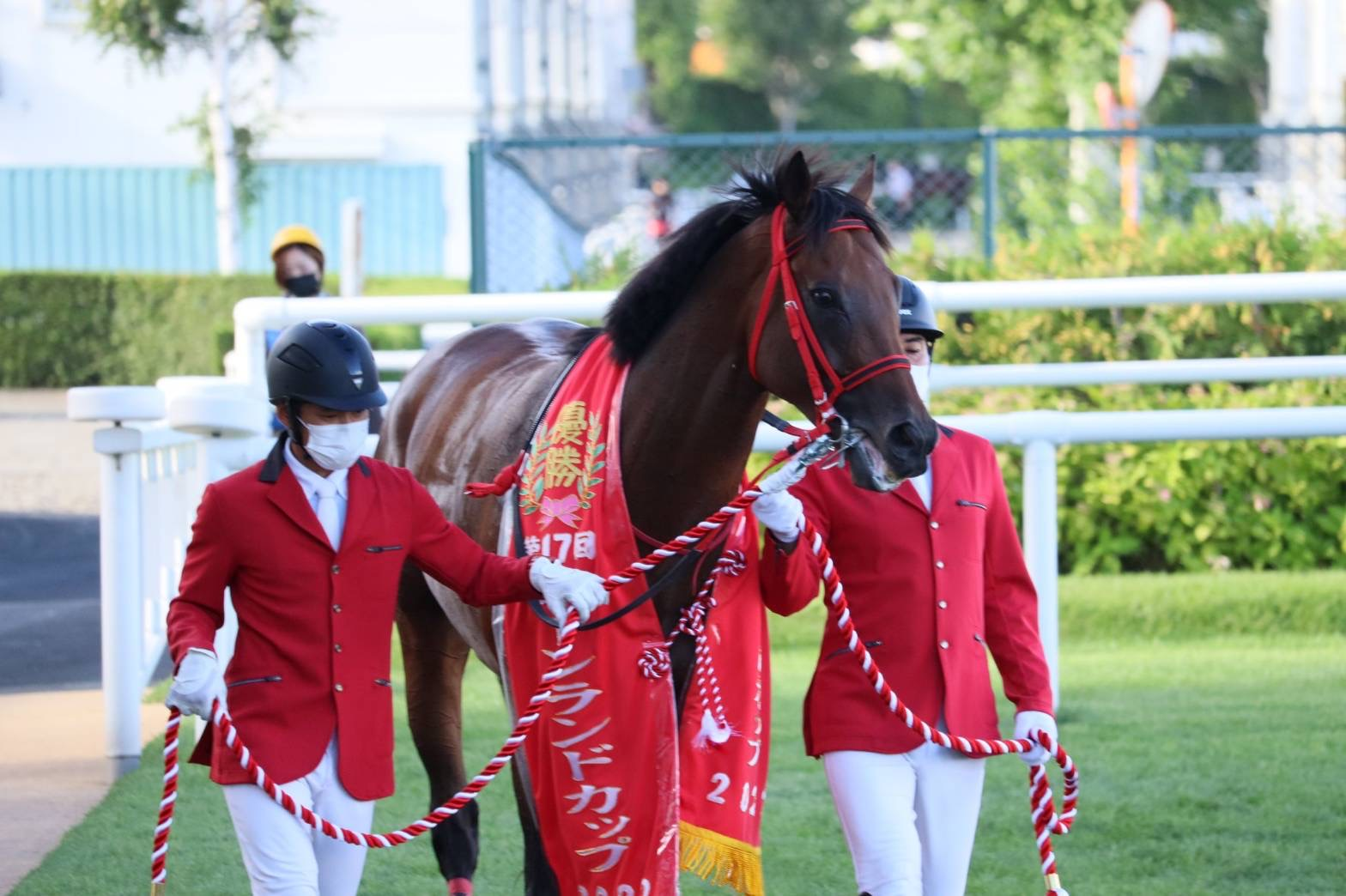
- 2022 Keeneland Cup winner, Vento Voce
- Class: Grade 3
- Location: Sapporo Racecourse
- Inaugurated: 1996
- Race type: Thoroughbred Flat racing

Race information
- Distance: 1200 meters
- Surface: Turf
- Track: Right-handed
- Qualification: 3-y-o+
- Weight: 4-y-o+ 56 kg, 3-y-o 53 kg, fillies allowed 2 kg
- Purse: ¥ 92,980,000 (as of 2025): 1st: ¥ 43,000,000; 2nd: ¥ 17,000,000; 3rd: ¥ 11,000,000

The Keeneland Cup (Japanese: キーンランドカップ) is a Grade 3 horse race for Thoroughbreds aged three and above. It is run in August over a distance of 1200 meters on turf at Sapporo Racecourse, located in Chūō-ku, Sapporo, Hokkaido, Japan. It serves as a trial race for the Sprinters Stakes, which takes place annually in late September or early October, with the winner of the race being given an entry slot to the race since 2014.

The Keeneland Cup was first run in 1996 as an open class race over a distance of 1000 meters before the distance was extended to the current 1200 meters in 2000. It would hold a Grade 3 status since 2006. It was run at Hakodate Racecourse in 2013.

It is named after the Keeneland racecourse and breeding operations, with the winner being awarded a trophy from the Keeneland Association.

== Weight ==
55 kg for three-year-old, 57 kg for four-year-old and above.

Allowances:

- 2 kg for fillies / mares
- 1 kg for southern hemisphere bred three-year-old

Penalties (excluding two-year-old race performance):

- If a graded stakes race has been won within a year:
  - 2 kg for a grade 1 win (1 kg for fillies / mares)
  - 1 kg for a grade 2 win
- If a graded stakes race has been won for more than a year:
  - 1 kg for a grade 1 win

== Winners since 2006 ==
Year	Winner	Age	Jockey	Trainer	Owner	Time
2006	Cheerful Smile	6	Yasunari Iwata	Yasuo Ikee	Academy	1:08.4
2007	Couverture	3	Norihiro Yokoyama	Sakae Kunieda	Hidaka Breeders Union	1:08.6
2008	Tanino Martini	8	Shinichiro Akiyama	Hikozo Sugai	Yuzo Tanimizu	1:07.9
2009	B B Guldan	5	Katsumi Ando	Masazo Ryoke	Bando Bokujo	1:08.4
2010	One Carat	4	Yusuke Fujioka	Kenichi Fujioka	Yoichi Aoyama	1:08.4
2011	Curren Chan	4	Kenichi Ikezoe	Takayuki Yasuda	Takashi Suzuki	1:08.6
2012	Pas de Trois	5	Katsumi Ando	Ippo Sameshima	Teruya Yoshida	1:07.6
2013	Forever Mark ^{[1]}	5	Issei Murata	Eiichi Yano	Yoichi Aoyama	1:11.7
2014	Robe Tissage	4	Kousei Miura	Naosuke Sugai	Silk	1:09.0
2015	Ukiyono Kaze	5	Hirofumi Shii	Takanori Kikuzawa	Jun Kokubu	1:08.6
2016	Blanc Bonheur	3	Keita Tosaki	Kazuya Nakatake	Yoko Maeda	1:08.5
2017	Epoisses	9	Christophe Lemaire	Kazuo Fujisawa	Nobutaka Tada	1:09.0
2018	Nac Venus	5	João Moreira	Hiroaki Sugiura	Kinya Komatsu	1:09.4
2019	Danon Smash	4	Yuga Kawada	Takayuki Yasuda	Danox	1:09.2
2020	Eighteen Girl	4	Ryusei Sakai	Yuji Iida	Yasushi Nakayama	1:10.6
2021	Lei Halia	3	Heart Kameda	Toshiaki Tajima	Hidaka Breeders Union	1:09.1
2022	Vento Voce	5	Christophe Lemaire	Mitsunori Makiura	Eden Association	1:09.1
2023	Namura Clair	4	Suguru Hamanaka	Kodai Hasegawa	Mutsuhiro Namura	1:09.9
2024	Satono Reve	5	Damian Lane	Noriyuki Hori	Hajime Satomi	1:07.9
2025	Panja Tower	3	Kohei Matsuyama	Shinsuke Hashiguchi	Deep Creek Ltd, Co.	1:08.2
2026	Sound Moryana	4	Yutaka Take	Hidenori Take	Yuichi Masuda	1:07.7

^{1} The 2013 race took place at Hakodate Racecourse.

== Earlier Winners ==
Year	Winner	Age	Jockey	Trainer	Owner	Time
1996	Ogi Tiffany	5	Hiroshi Gohara	Hiroyuki Gohara	Ogifushi Bokujo Racing Club	0:56.5
1997	A.P.Rahy	5	Yasuhiko Yasuda	Hiroshi Takeda	Del Mar Club	0:57.2
1998	Super Nakayama	4	Katsuharu Tanaka	Kazuo Konishi	Shinwa Shokai	0:58.1
1999	Symboli Sword	4	Yukio Okabe	Kazuo Fujisawa	Symboli Stud	0:58.5
2000	Mejiro Darling	4	Koshiro Take	Yokichi Okubo	Mejiro Stud	1:09.5
2001	Epigraph	4	Mikio Matsunaga	Kenji Yamauchi	Hideo Yokoyama	1:09.4
2002	Blue Shotgun	3	Mikio Matsunaga	Kohei Take	Ogifushi Racing Club	1:09.5
2003	Takao Ruby	3	Takanori Kikuzawa	Isamu Shibasaki	Terada Komuten	1:08.4
2004	Lord Dalmatian	5	Mikio Matsunaga	Masanori Ito	Lord Horse Club	1:09.3
2005	More Than Best	3	Fuyuki Igarashi	Yoshitaka Ninomiya	Masako Iida	1:08.9

== See also ==
- Horse racing in Japan
- List of Japanese flat horse races
