= Namura Clair =

Japanese Thoroughbred racehorse

Namura Clair ナムラクレア
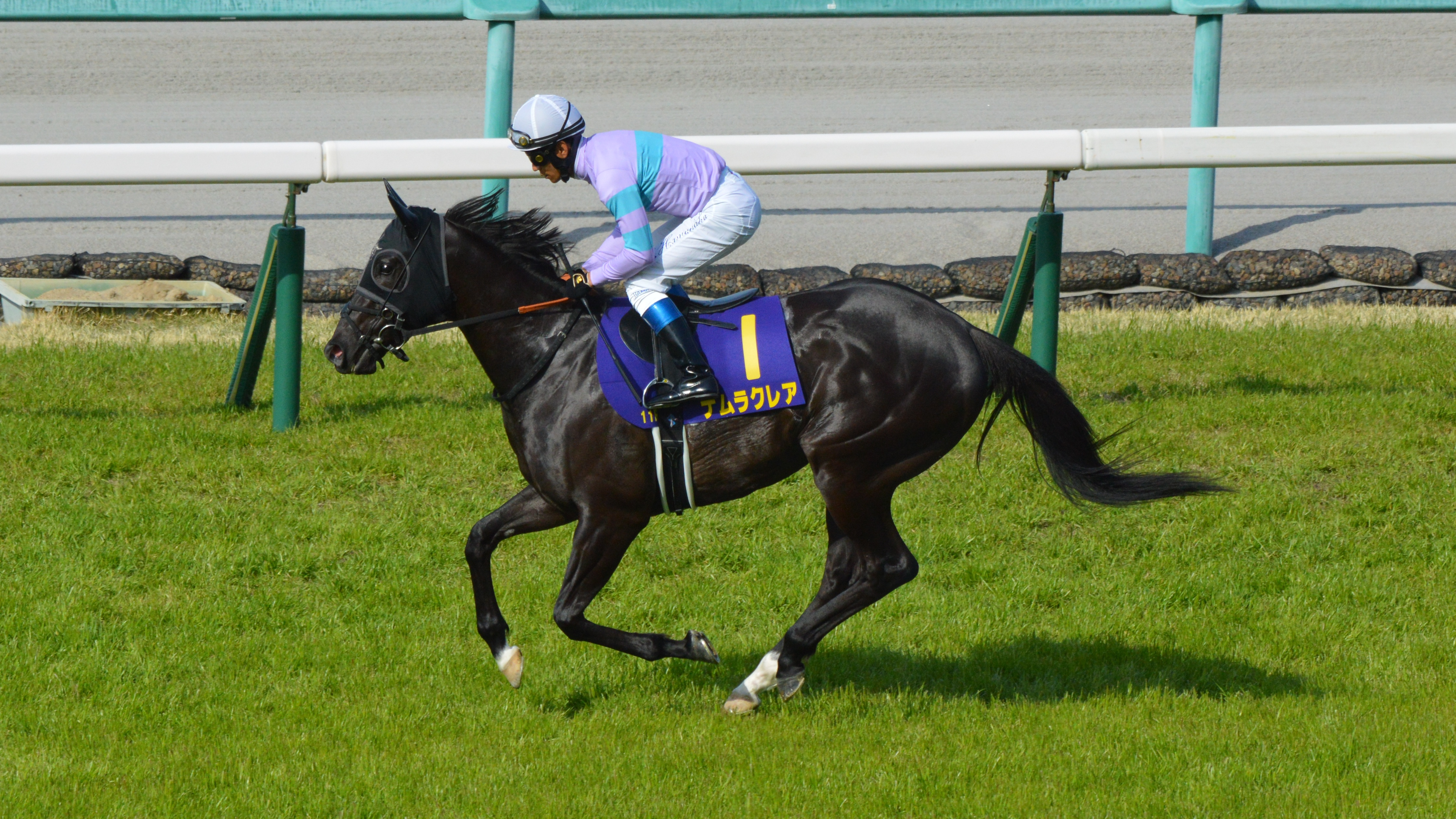
- Namura Clair at the 2022 Oka Shō
- Breed: Thoroughbred
- Sire: Mikki Isle
- Grandsire: Deep Impact
- Dam: Sun Queen II
- Damsire: Storm Cat
- Sex: Mare
- Foaled: 30 March 2019
- Country: Japan
- Colour: Dark bay
- Breeder: Tanigawa Bokujo
- Owner: Mutsuhiro Namura
- Racing colours
- Trainer: Kodai Hasegawa
- Jockey: Suguru Hamanaka; Christophe Lemaire
- Record: 25: 6-7-5
- Earnings: ¥732,822,000

Major wins
- Hanshin Cup (2024); Kokura Nisai Stakes (2021); Hakodate Sprint Stakes (2022); Silk Road Stakes (2023); Keeneland Cup (2023)

Namura Clair (Japanese: ナムラクレア, Hepburn: Namura Kurea; 30 March 2019) is a retired Japanese Thoroughbred racehorse. She competed from 2021 to 2026, recording six wins in twenty-five starts, including the Hanshin Cup (GII) in 2024, the Kokura Nisai Stakes (GIII) in 2021, the Hakodate Sprint Stakes (GIII) in 2022, the Silk Road Stakes (GIII) and Keeneland Cup (GIII) in 2023. She finished second in the Takamatsunomiya Kinen (GI) in three consecutive years (2023–2025) and third in the Sprinters Stakes (GI) in three consecutive years (2023–2025).

== Background ==
Namura Clair is a dark bay mare bred in Urakawa, Hokkaido, by Tanigawa Bokujo. She was sired by Mikki Isle, a son of Deep Impact, and her dam was Sun Queen II, an American-bred mare by Storm Cat. Her racing name combines the "Namura" prefix used by owner Mutsuhiro Namura with "Clair," a female given name. She was sent into training with Kodai Hasegawa at the JRA's Ritto Training Center.

== Racing career ==
=== 2021: Two-year-old season ===
Namura Clair debuted on August 1, 2021, in a maiden race on the turf at Niigata Racecourse, finishing third. She won the Phoenix Sho (Open) at Kokura Racecourse on August 14. On September 5, she won the Kokura Nisai Stakes (GIII) at Kokura, ridden by Suguru Hamanaka, defeating Threeperda by 0.4 seconds. She finished second in the Fantasy Stakes (GIII) at Hanshin Racecourse in November and fifth in the Hanshin Juvenile Fillies (GI) in December.

=== 2022: Three-year-old season ===
Namura Clair finished second in the Fillies' Revue (GII) at Hanshin in March. She finished third in the Oka Shō (GI) at Hanshin in April. On June 12, she won the Hakodate Sprint Stakes (GIII) at Hakodate Racecourse, carrying 50 kg, in a time of 1:07.2. She finished third in the Kitakyushu Kinen (GIII) at Kokura in August and fifth in the Sprinters Stakes (GI) at Nakayama Racecourse in October.

=== 2023: Four-year-old season ===
On January 29, Namura Clair won the Silk Road Stakes (GIII) at Chukyo Racecourse, defeating Fast Force by a head. She finished second in the Takamatsunomiya Kinen (GI) at Chukyo in March, losing by 0.1 seconds to Fast Force on a heavy track. She finished eighth in the Victoria Mile (GI) at Tokyo Racecourse in May.

On August 27, she won the Keeneland Cup (GIII) at Sapporo Racecourse, defeating Cinnamon Stick by 0.2 seconds. She finished third in the Sprinters Stakes (GI) at Nakayama in October, losing by 0.2 seconds to Mama Cocha.

=== 2024: Five-year-old season ===
Namura Clair finished second in the Kyoto Himba Stakes (GIII) at Kyoto Racecourse in February. She finished second in the Takamatsunomiya Kinen (GI) at Chukyo in March, losing by a head to Mad Cool. She finished fifth in the Keeneland Cup (GIII) at Sapporo in August. She finished third in the Sprinters Stakes (GI) at Nakayama in September, ridden by Takeshi Yokoyama.

On December 21, she won the Hanshin Cup (GII) at Kyoto, ridden by Christophe Lemaire, defeating Mad Cool by 0.1 seconds.

=== 2025: Six-year-old season ===
Namura Clair finished second in the Takamatsunomiya Kinen (GI) at Chukyo on March 30, losing by 0.1 seconds to Satono Reve. She finished eighth in the Hakodate Sprint Stakes (GIII) at Hakodate in June. She finished third in the Sprinters Stakes (GI) at Nakayama in September. She finished second in the Hanshin Cup (GII) at Hanshin in December, losing by a nose to Lugal.

=== 2026: Seven-year-old season and retirement ===
Namura Clair made her final start in the Takamatsunomiya Kinen (GI) at Chukyo on March 29, 2026, ridden by Shun Hamanaka, finishing sixth. She was deregistered from JRA competition on April 4, 2026.

== Statistics ==
The following table details all 25 starts of Namura Clair's racing career based on official netkeiba and JBIS records.

Date	Distance (Condition)	Race	Class	Course	Odds (Favourite)	Field	Finish	Time	Jockey	Winning (Losing) Margin	Winner (2nd Place)	Ref
2021 – two-year-old season
Aug 1	Turf 1600 m (Firm)	2-Y-O Newcomer	Maiden	Niigata	13.1 (5th)	17	3rd	1:36.1	Katsuma Sameshima	0.7	Bon Courage	
Aug 14	Turf 1200 m (Heavy)	Phoenix Sho	Open	Kokura	4.1 (2nd)	10	1st	1:10.8	Kohei Matsuyama	–0.1	(T M Spada)	
Sep 5	Turf 1200 m (Firm)	Kokura Nisai Stakes	GIII	Kokura	6.4 (4th)	10	1st	1:07.9	Suguru Hamanaka	–0.4	(Sri Pada)	
Nov 6	Turf 1400 m (Firm)	Fantasy Stakes	GIII	Hanshin	2.5 (1st)	10	2nd	1:21.2	Suguru Hamanaka	0.1	Water Navillera	
Dec 12	Turf 1600 m (Firm)	Hanshin Juvenile Fillies	GI	Hanshin	11.9 (6th)	18	5th	1:34.3	Suguru Hamanaka	0.5	Circle of Life	
2022 – three-year-old season
Mar 13	Turf 1400 m (Firm)	Fillies' Revue	GII	Hanshin	1.7 (1st)	15	2nd	1:19.9	Suguru Hamanaka	0.0	Sublime Anthem	
Apr 10	Turf 1600 m (Firm)	Oka Shō	GI	Hanshin	14.5 (7th)	18	3rd	1:33.0	Suguru Hamanaka	0.1	Stars on Earth	
Jun 12	Turf 1200 m (Firm)	Hakodate Sprint Stakes	GIII	Hakodate	2.1 (1st)	16	1st	1:07.2	Suguru Hamanaka	–0.4	(Jubilee Head)	
Aug 21	Turf 1200 m (Firm)	Kitakyushu Kinen	GIII	Kokura	2.1 (1st)	18	3rd	1:07.1	Suguru Hamanaka	0.2	Bon Voyage	
Oct 2	Turf 1200 m (Firm)	Sprinters Stakes	GI	Nakayama	2.9 (2nd)	16	5th	1:08.0	Suguru Hamanaka	0.2	Gendarme	
2023 – four-year-old season
Jan 29	Turf 1200 m (Firm)	Silk Road Stakes	GIII	Chukyo	4.8 (2nd)	15	1st	1:07.3	Suguru Hamanaka	0.0	(Fast Force)	
Mar 26	Turf 1200 m (Heavy)	Takamatsunomiya Kinen	GI	Chukyo	5.4 (2nd)	18	2nd	1:11.6	Suguru Hamanaka	0.1	Fast Force	
May 14	Turf 1600 m (Firm)	Victoria Mile	GI	Tokyo	15.7 (5th)	16	8th	1:32.9	Suguru Hamanaka	0.7	Songline	
Aug 27	Turf 1200 m (Soft)	Keeneland Cup	GIII	Sapporo	2.4 (1st)	16	1st	1:09.9	Suguru Hamanaka	–0.2	(Cinnamon Stick)	
Oct 1	Turf 1200 m (Firm)	Sprinters Stakes	GI	Nakayama	2.9 (1st)	16	3rd	1:08.2	Suguru Hamanaka	0.2	Mama Cocha	
2024 – five-year-old season
Feb 17	Turf 1400 m (Firm)	Kyoto Himba Stakes	GIII	Kyoto	2.8 (1st)	18	2nd	1:20.3	Suguru Hamanaka	0.0	So Dazzling	
Mar 24	Turf 1200 m (Soft)	Takamatsunomiya Kinen	GI	Chukyo	5.4 (2nd)	18	2nd	1:08.9	Suguru Hamanaka	0.0	Mad Cool	
Aug 25	Turf 1200 m (Firm)	Keeneland Cup	GIII	Sapporo	2.2 (1st)	16	5th	1:08.3	Suguru Hamanaka	0.4	Satono Reve	
Sep 29	Turf 1200 m (Firm)	Sprinters Stakes	GI	Nakayama	8.2 (4th)	16	3rd	1:07.1	Takeshi Yokoyama	0.1	Lugal	
Dec 21	Turf 1400 m (Firm)	Hanshin Cup	GII	Kyoto	3.7 (1st)	18	1st	1:20.1	Christophe Lemaire	–0.1	(Mad Cool)	
2025 – six-year-old season
Mar 30	Turf 1200 m (Firm)	Takamatsunomiya Kinen	GI	Chukyo	3.5 (1st)	18	2nd	1:08.0	Christophe Lemaire	0.1	Satono Reve	
Jun 14	Turf 1200 m (Firm)	Hakodate Sprint Stakes	GIII	Hakodate	1.7 (1st)	16	8th	1:07.2	Christophe Lemaire	0.6	Ka Pilina	
Sep 28	Turf 1200 m (Firm)	Sprinters Stakes	GI	Nakayama	5.7 (2nd)	16	3rd	1:07.2	Christophe Lemaire	0.3	Win Carnelian	
Dec 27	Turf 1400 m (Firm)	Hanshin Cup	GII	Hanshin	1.9 (1st)	16	2nd	1:19.0	Christophe Lemaire	0.0	Lugal	
2026 – seven-year-old season
Mar 29	Turf 1200 m (Firm)	Takamatsunomiya Kinen	GI	Chukyo	4.0 (2nd)	18	6th	1:07.1	Suguru Hamanaka	0.8	Satono Reve	

== Post-racing career ==
Following her retirement, Namura Clair returned to Tanigawa Bokujo in Urakawa, Hokkaido, to become a broodmare. Her first mating was planned with Equinox.

== Pedigree ==
Pedigree of Namura Clair (JPN)
Sire Mikki Isle (JPN) 2011	Deep Impact (JPN); 2002	Sunday Silence	Halo
Sire Mikki Isle (JPN) 2011	Deep Impact (JPN); 2002	Sunday Silence	Wishing Well
Sire Mikki Isle (JPN) 2011	Deep Impact (JPN); 2002	Wind in Her Hair	Alzao
Sire Mikki Isle (JPN) 2011	Deep Impact (JPN); 2002	Wind in Her Hair	Burghclere
Sire Mikki Isle (JPN) 2011	Star Isle (USA); 2004	Rock of Gibraltar	Danehill
Sire Mikki Isle (JPN) 2011	Star Isle (USA); 2004	Rock of Gibraltar	Offshore Boom
Sire Mikki Isle (JPN) 2011	Star Isle (USA); 2004	Isle de France	Nureyev
Sire Mikki Isle (JPN) 2011	Star Isle (USA); 2004	Isle de France	Stella Madrid
Dam Sun Queen II (USA) 2008	Storm Cat (USA); 1983	Storm Bird	Northern Dancer
Dam Sun Queen II (USA) 2008	Storm Cat (USA); 1983	Storm Bird	South Ocean
Dam Sun Queen II (USA) 2008	Storm Cat (USA); 1983	Terlingua	Secretariat
Dam Sun Queen II (USA) 2008	Storm Cat (USA); 1983	Terlingua	Crimson Saint
Dam Sun Queen II (USA) 2008	Fountain of Peace (USA); 2002	Kris S.	Roberto
Dam Sun Queen II (USA) 2008	Fountain of Peace (USA); 2002	Kris S.	Sharp Queen
Dam Sun Queen II (USA) 2008	Fountain of Peace (USA); 2002	Coup de Genie	Mr. Prospector
Dam Sun Queen II (USA) 2008	Fountain of Peace (USA); 2002	Coup de Genie	Coup de Folie

- Namura Clair is inbred 4 × 5 to Halo, 4 × 5 to Northern Dancer, and 5 × 5 to Hail to Reason.
- Her half-sister Namura Clara (by Admire Mars) won the 2025 Kōbai Stakes (Listed).
- Her third dam Coup de Genie won the Prix Morny and Prix de la Salamandre (both GI) in France.

== See also ==
- Thoroughbred racing in Japan
- Hanshin Cup
- Takamatsunomiya Kinen
