= Panja Tower =

Japanese racehorse

Panja Tower パンジャタワー
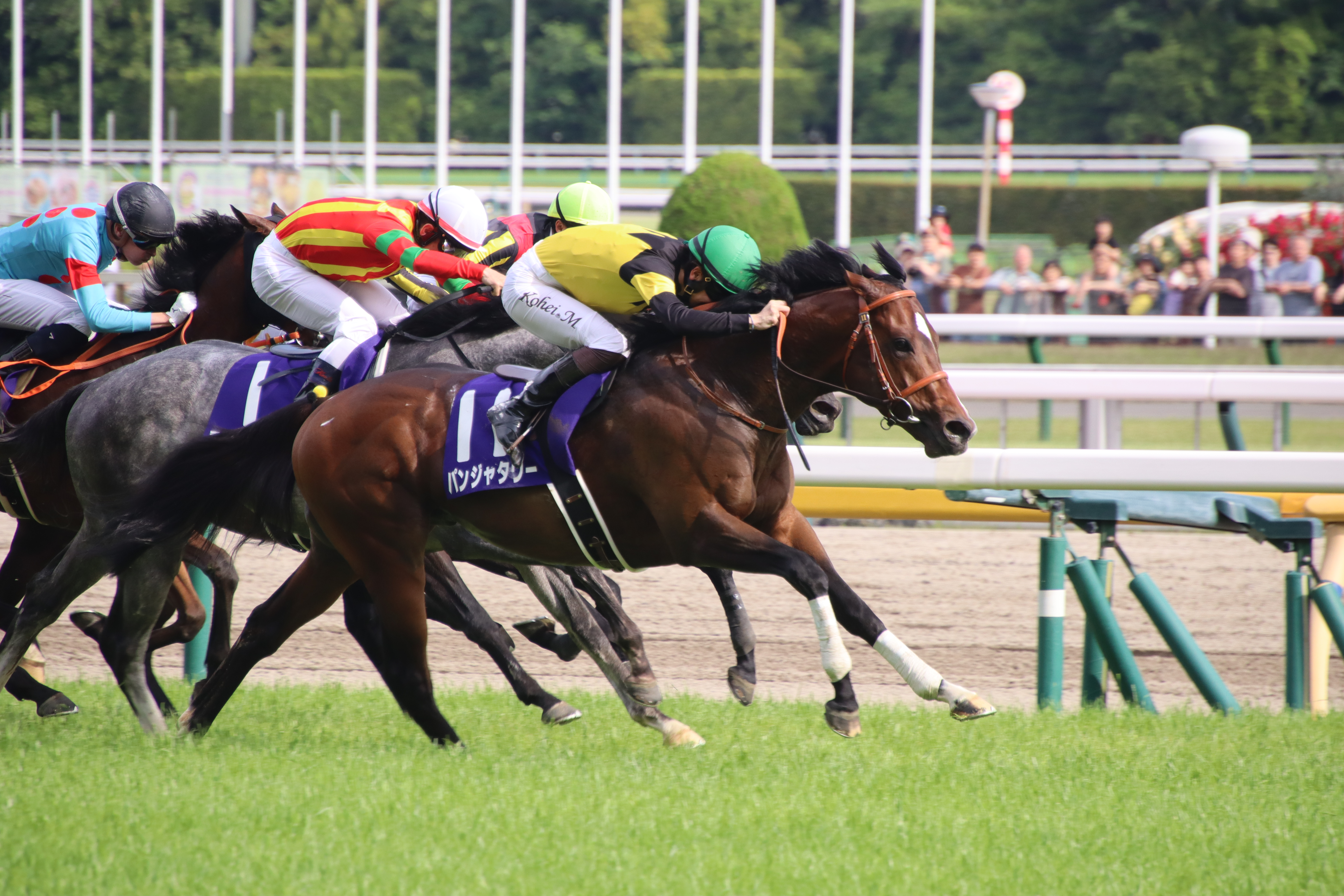
- Panja Tower (11) at the 2025 NHK Mile Cup
- Sire: Tower of London
- Grandsire: Raven's Pass
- Dam: Clarksdale
- Damsire: Victoire Pisa
- Sex: Colt
- Foaled: February 21, 2022 (age 4)
- Country: Japan
- Color: Bay
- Breeder: Champions Farm
- Owner: Deep Creek Ltd, Co.
- Racing colours
- Trainer: Shinsuke Hashiguchi
- Jockey: Kohei Matsuyama
- Record: 12: 4-1-0
- Earnings: 324,109,900 JPY (Note: Earnings earned overseas are converted to JPY using the formula provided by JRA.); JPN: 290,390,000 JPY; AUS: 250,000 AUD; KSA: 60,000 USD

Major wins
- Keio Hai Nisai Stakes (2024); NHK Mile Cup (2025); Keeneland Cup (2025)
- Last updated on November 1, 2025

Panja Tower (Japanese: パンジャタワー, Hepburn: Panja Tawā; foaled February 21, 2022) is an active Japanese Thoroughbred racehorse best known for winning the 2025 NHK Mile Cup.

He was named after his sire while bearing his owner's crown name.

== Background ==
Panja Tower was born at Champions Farm in Hokkaido, Japan. His dam, Clarksdale, was an unraced mare purchased for ¥1.5 million (excluding tax) at the 2019 Northern Farm Broodmare Sale. Akihito Nakamura, president of Champions Farm, remarked on the colt’s early development: "He wasn’t particularly striking at birth, but his exceptional movement on Champion Hills’ training slopes made people around him say, ‘This horse runs incredibly well."

== Racing career ==
=== 2024: two-year-old season ===
Panja Tower debuted on September 8, 2024, in a 2-year-old maiden race at Chukyo Racecourse over a distance of 1200 meters on turf. He won the race by a half length victory as the favorite.

On November 2, he contested the Keio Hai Nisai Stakes at Tokyo Racecourse. Racing mid-pack under jockey Kohei Matsuyama, he swung wide into the stretch and unleashed the fastest closing speed in the field to win by a neck. This victory marked the first graded stakes win for a foal sired by Tower of London, a freshman stallion and son of Raven's Pass.

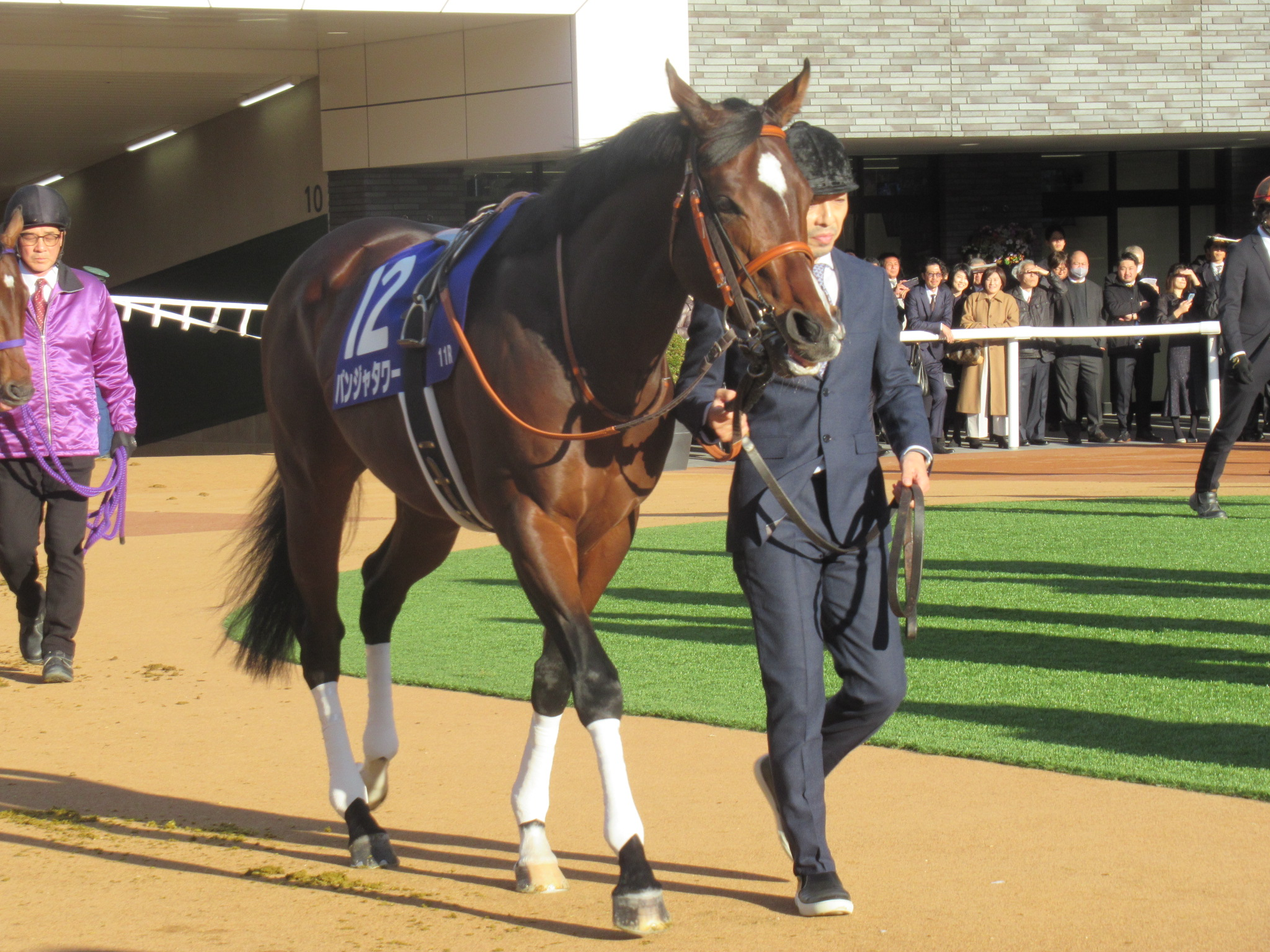
Panja Tower at Asahi Hai FS Paddock

In his next race, he was targeted to the Asahi Hai Futurity Stakes on December 15 at Kyoto Racecourse as his first grade one stakes challenge. Starting as the fourth favorite, he finished 12th, unable to reproduce his devastating turn of foot. Two days later, his connections announced that he is targeted to NHK Mile Cup on spring with a warm-up race in between.

=== 2025: three-year-old season ===
Panja Tower began his classic campaign in the Falcon Stakes on March 22, ridden by Yusuke Fujioka. He broke well and traveled mid-pack; he got a clear lane swinging to the home straight and chased with great speed but was unable to catch the winner. He finished fourth by three-quarters of a length to the winner.

On May 11, he ran his target race, the NHK Mile Cup at Tokyo Racecourse over a distance of 1600 meters. Starting as the 9th favorite with Kohei Matsuyama back on his saddle, he settled in the mid-pack as in his previous races. Swinging the widest in the final stretch, he unleashed his devastating speed, easily overtaking the Asahi Hai Futurity Stakes winner, Admire Zoom. He held off the fast-finishing Magic Sands to win the race by a head, securing his first grade one stakes victory. Notably his sire, Tower of London, ran the same race in 2018 as the favorite and lost the race to 12th place. He is the first grade one stakes winner for Tower of London as a sire.

On August 24, Panja Tower won the Keeneland Cup. He was then sent to contest his first race abroad, the Golden Eagle in Australia, on November 1, where he finished 5th behind the local filly Autumn Glow.

=== 2026: four-year-old season ===
Panja Tower started his season with an overseas G2 race, which was the 1351 Turf Sprint at King Abdulaziz Racetrack in February. He made a good run by holding on in early phase, moved to the outside track and accelerated further up reaching the third place before gassed out and finished in fifth on the line. Then, he returned to Japan and tried his luck on the Takamatsunomiya Kinen in late March as his groom, Igarashi noted that the horse suited for the sprint distances referring to his win back in the Keeneland Cup. He was touted as a third favourite of the race behind reigning champion, Satono Reve and Namura Clair. When the race began, Panja Tower positioned himself amongst the leading pack in fourth position. He joined the final rally for the win but weakened in the final strides and remained in fourth position at the wire, losing the final podium position by a neck over Win Carnelian and two and half lengths behind the eventual back to back winner, Satono Reve. In June, Panja Tower alongside Matsuyama as his rider was well prepared for the Yasuda Kinen. Breaking out from gate 16, he settled on the middle pack and pace chasing at sixth position. He gradually went up the order as the race went on and battled to the line alongside Sixpence, World's End, Gaia Force and Seiun Hades in which he finished in fifth place behind all those other horses.

In the summer, he had a run at the Keeneland Cup, a race in which he won the previous year. Out of the gate, he sprinted on the outside track in the leading group. Reaching the final corner, he swooped from the outside and gained speed but was unable to extend enough to reach the eventual winner, Sound Moryana. Matsuyama said the horse showed its strength, well-positioned, but the winner just edged them on the track. Her second race for the second half of the campaign would be in the Sprinters Stakes at the end of September. In this race, he was unable to perform well, racing mainly in eighth position before dropping down as they approached the finish line. He finished 15th, his worst finish of the career since the 2024 Asahi Hai Futurity Stakes. Post race, Matsuyama commented that the track conditions made him slipping his footsteps during the race, which in turn demotivated the horse to run well on the day.

== Racing statistics ==
Below data is based on data available on JBIS Search, NetKeiba, and Jockey Club Saudi Arabia.

| Date | Track | Race | Grade | Distance (Condition) | Entry | HN | Odds (Favored) | Finish | Time | Margins | Jockey | Winner (Runner-up) |
|---|---|---|---|---|---|---|---|---|---|---|---|---|
2024 – two-year-old season
| Sep 8 | Chukyo | 2YO Debut | | 1,200 m (Firm) | 7 | 3 | 1.6 (1) | 1st | 1:09.7 | -0.1 | Kohei Matsuyama | (Tagano Enfant) |
| Nov 2 | Tokyo | Keio Hai Nisai Stakes | GII | 1,400 m (Good) | 14 | 7 | 21.0 (8) | 1st | 1:21.2 | -0.1 | Kohei Matsuyama | (Meiner Ticket) |
| Dec 15 | Kyoto | Asahi Hai FS | GI | 1,600 m (Firm) | 16 | 12 | 9.0 (4) | 12th | 1:35.8 | 1.7 | Kohei Matsuyama | Admire Zoom |
2025 – three-year-old season
| Mar 22 | Chukyo | Falcon Stakes | GIII | 1,400 m (Firm) | 18 | 4 | 4.5 (1) | 4th | 1:21.1 | 0.1 | Yusuke Fujioka | Yankee Barows |
| May 11 | Tokyo | NHK Mile Cup | GI | 1,600 m (Firm) | 18 | 11 | 26.1 (9) | 1st | 1:31.7 | 0.0 | Kohei Matsuyama | (Magic Sands) |
| Aug 24 | Sapporo | Keeneland Cup | GIII | 1,200 m (Firm) | 16 | 5 | 5.5 (2) | 1st | 1:08.2 | -0.1 | Kohei Matsuyama | (Pair Pollux) |
| Nov 1 | Randwick | Golden Eagle | | 1,500 m (Soft) | 16 | 12 | 8.0 (3) | 5th | | | Kohei Matsuyama | Autumn Glow |
2026 – four-year-old season
| Feb 14 | King Abdulaziz | 1351 Turf Sprint | GII | 1,351 m (Firm) | 13 | 8 | 4.5 (2) | 5th | 1:18.7 | 0.5 | Joao Moreira | Reef Runner |
| Mar 29 | Chukyo | Takamatsunomiya Kinen | GI | 1,200 m (Firm) | 18 | 1 | 5.0 (3) | 4th | 1:06.7 | 0.4 | Kohei Matsuyama | Satono Reve |
| Jun 7 | Tokyo | Yasuda Kinen | GI | 1,600 m (Firm) | 17 | 16 | 8.3 (4) | 5th | 1:32.2 | 0.1 | Kohei Matsuyama | Sixpence |
| Aug 23 | Sapporo | Keeneland Cup | GIII | 1,200 m (Firm) | 16 | 3 | 1.9 (1) | 2nd | 1:07.9 | 0.2 | Kohei Matsuyama | Sound Moryana |
| Sep 27 | Nakayama | Sprinters Stakes | GI | 1,200 m (Good) | 16 | 13 | 3.9 (2) | 15th | 1:11.9 | 2.7 | Kohei Matsuyama | Puro Magic |

Legend:
Turf

== Pedigree ==
Pedigree of Panja Tower (JPN), bay colt, 2022
| Sire Tower of London b. 2015 | Raven's Pass (USA) ch. 2005 | Elusive Quality | Gone West |
| Sire Tower of London b. 2015 | Raven's Pass (USA) ch. 2005 | Elusive Quality | Touch of Greatness |
| Sire Tower of London b. 2015 | Raven's Pass (USA) ch. 2005 | Ascutney | Lord At War (ARG) |
| Sire Tower of London b. 2015 | Raven's Pass (USA) ch. 2005 | Ascutney | Right Word |
| Sire Tower of London b. 2015 | Snow Pine (GB) gr. 2010 | Dalakhani (IRE) | Darshaan (GB) |
| Sire Tower of London b. 2015 | Snow Pine (GB) gr. 2010 | Dalakhani (IRE) | Daltawa |
| Sire Tower of London b. 2015 | Snow Pine (GB) gr. 2010 | Shinko Hermes (IRE) | Sadler's Wells (USA) |
| Sire Tower of London b. 2015 | Snow Pine (GB) gr. 2010 | Shinko Hermes (IRE) | Doff the Derby (USA) |
| Dam Clarksdale dk. b. 2016 | Victoire Pisa dk. b. 2007 | Neo Universe | Sunday Silence (USA) |
| Dam Clarksdale dk. b. 2016 | Victoire Pisa dk. b. 2007 | Neo Universe | Pointed Path (GB) |
| Dam Clarksdale dk. b. 2016 | Victoire Pisa dk. b. 2007 | Whitewater Affair (GB) | Machiavellian (USA) |
| Dam Clarksdale dk. b. 2016 | Victoire Pisa dk. b. 2007 | Whitewater Affair (GB) | Much Too Risky |
| Dam Clarksdale dk. b. 2016 | Acoustics b. 2001 | Cape Cross (IRE) | Green Desert (USA) |
| Dam Clarksdale dk. b. 2016 | Acoustics b. 2001 | Cape Cross (IRE) | Park Appeal |
| Dam Clarksdale dk. b. 2016 | Acoustics b. 2001 | Soninke (GB) | Machiavellian (USA) |
| Dam Clarksdale dk. b. 2016 | Acoustics b. 2001 | Soninke (GB) | Sonic Lady (USA) (Half-bred Family: B3) |

- His uncle, Logi Universe by Acoustics, won the 2009 Tōkyō Yūshun (Japanese Derby).
- His great-great-grandmother Sonic Lady won three group one races, including the Irish 1,000 Guineas in 1986.
