= Keio Hai Nisai Stakes =

Keio Hai Nisai Stakes 京王杯2歳ステークス
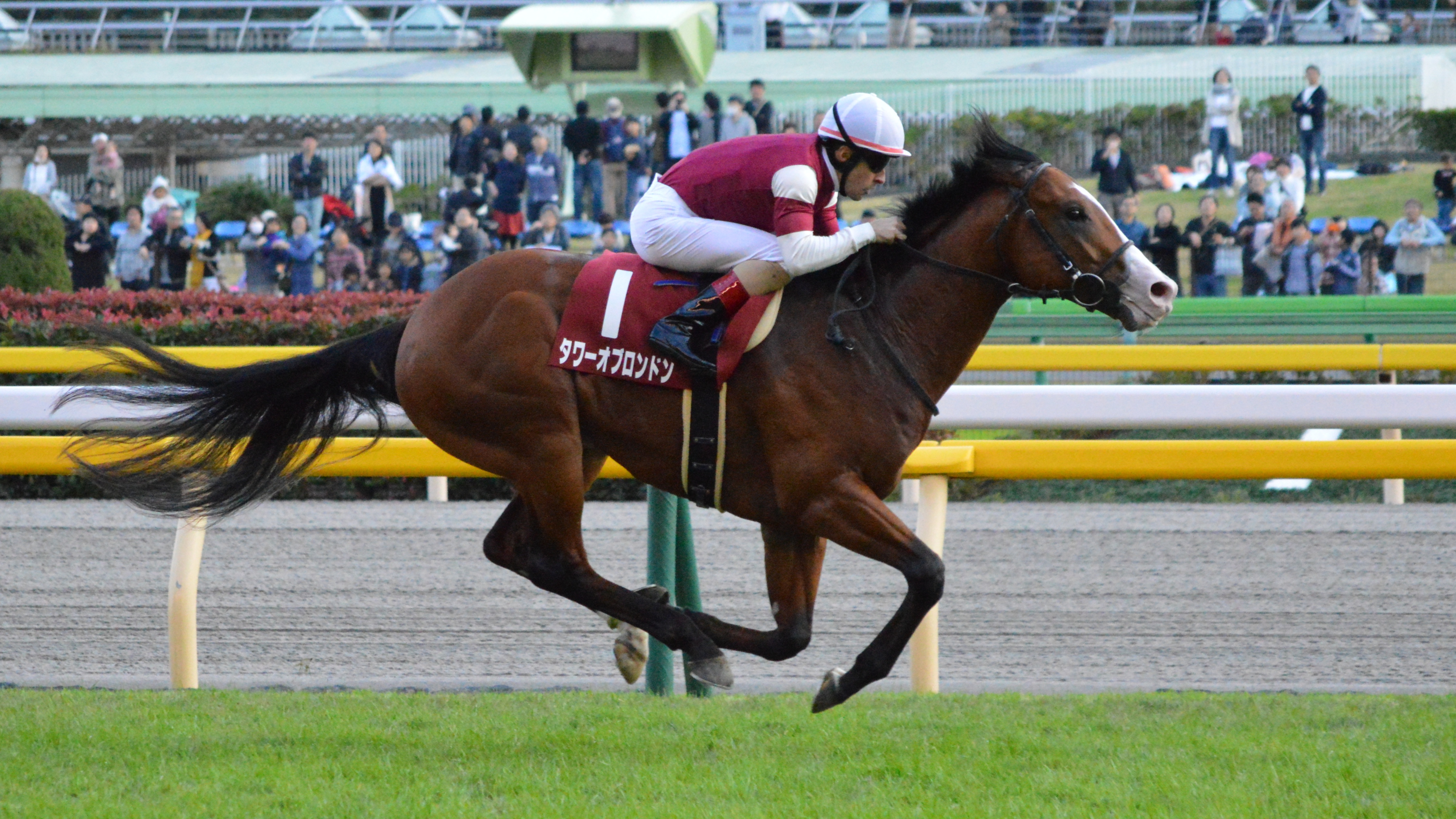
- 2017 Keio Hai Nisai Stakes
- Class: Grade 2
- Location: Tokyo Racecourse
- Inaugurated: 1965
- Race type: Thoroughbred Flat racing

Race information
- Distance: 1400 metres
- Surface: Turf
- Track: Left-handed
- Qualification: 2-y-o colts and fillies
- Weight: 56 kg Allowance: Fillies 1 kg
- Purse: ¥ 82,380,000 (as of 2025): 1st: ¥ 38,000,000; 2nd: ¥ 15,000,000; 3rd: ¥ 10,000,000

The Keio Hai Nisai Stakes (Japanese 京王杯2歳ステークス) is a Grade 2 flat horse race in Japan for two-year-old Thoroughbreds. It is run over a distance of 1400 metres at Tokyo Racecourse in November.

The Keio Hai Nisai Stakes was first run in 1965 and was elevated to Grade 2 status in 1984. It was usually run at Nakayama Racecourse until 1979 and made a one-off return to that venue in 2002. It serves as a trial race for the 1600-meter Asahi Hai Futurity Stakes, which is considered the de facto year-end championship for Japanese thoroughbred racing in the two-year-olds division.

== Winners since 2000 ==
Year	Winner	Jockey	Trainer	Owner	Time
2000	T M Southpaw	Ryuji Wada	Mitsuharu Shibata	Masatsugu Takezono	1:22.3
2001	Siberian Meadow	Hiroki Goto	Masahiro Horii	Yoshio Fujita	1:25.8
2002	Blue Concorde ^{[1]}	Hiroki Goto	Toshiyuki Hattori	Ogifushi Racing Club	1:09.4
2003	Cosmo Sunbeam	Yutaka Take	Shuichi Sasaki	Misako Okada	1:21.8
2004	Skip Jack	Masaki Katsuura	Yutaka Takahashi	Dearest	1:22.1
2005	Denshamichi	Yoshitomi Shibata	Norihiro Tanaka	Yuichi Odagiri	1:23.3
2006	Meiner Rainier	Masami Matsuoka	Masato Nihizono	Thoroughbred Club Ruffian	1:22.6
2007	Apollo Dolce	Hiroki Goto	Masahiro Horii	Apollo Thoroughbred Club	1:22.7
2008	Get Full Marks	Hirofumi Shii	Takaki Iwato	K.J.R.	1:21.6
2009	Eishin Apollon	Kenichi Ikezoe	Inao Okada	Toyomitsu Hirai	1:22.0
2010	Grand Prix Boss	Mirco Demuro	Yoshito Yahagi	Grand Prix	1:21.8
2011	Leo Active	Norihiro Yokoyama	Hiroaki Sugiura	Leo	1:22.1
2012	A Shin Top	Suguru Hamanaka	Masato Nihizono	Eishindo	1:21.2
2013	Karada Legend	Hironobu Tanabe	Kazuyuki Ogata	Yuki Koyasu	1:23.1
2014	Second Table	Keita Tosaki	Hiroki Sakiyama	Kazuyoshi Yamagami	1:21.5
2015	Ball Lightning	Masayoshi Ebina	Hiroshi Miyamoto	Green Farm	1:22.6
2016	Monde Can Know	Christophe Lemaire	Takayuki Yasuda	Your Story	1:21.9
2017	Tower of London	Christophe Lemaire	Kazuo Fujisawa	Mohammed bin Rashid Al Maktoum	1:21.9
2018	Fantasist	Yutaka Take	Tomoyuki Umeda	Toshihiro Hirosaki	1:24.7
2019	Taisei Vision	Christophe Lemaire	Masayuki Nishimura	Seiho Tanaka	1:20.8
2020	Mondreise	Christophe Lemaire	Mikio Matsunaga	Carrot Farm	1:21.8
2021	King Hermes	Ryusei Sakai	Yoshito Yahagi	Hiroo Race	1:21.3
2022	Obamburumai	Takeshi Yokoyama	Keiji Yoshimura	Koji Oka	1:20.9
2023	Corazon Beat	Takeshi Yokoyama	Shizuya Kato	Thoroughbred Club Ruffian	1:20.6
2024	Panja Tower	Kohei Matsuyama	Shinsuke Hashiguchi	Deep Creek	1:21.2
2025	Diamond Knot	Christophe Lemaire	Yuichi Fukunaga	Kaneko Makoto Holdings	1:20.9
2026	Blue Jay	Christophe Lemaire	Yukihiro Kato	Carrot Farm	1:21.3

^{1} The 2002 race took place at Nakayama Racecourse over a distance of 1,200 metres.

== Earlier winners ==
- 1965 - Hyades
- 1966 - Mejiro Flame
- 1967 - Yamato Dake
- 1968 - Shougekkou
- 1969 - Arrow Express
- 1970 - Suzuran Path
- 1971 - Toku Zakura
- 1972 - Mammy Blue
- 1973 - Colonel Symboli
- 1974 - Tesco Gaby
- 1975 - Fairsport
- 1976 - Seine Sport
- 1977 - Takeden
- 1978 - Jet Barge
- 1979 - Shadai Dancer
- 1980 - Takeno Dia
- 1981 - East Boy
- 1982 - Dokan Yashima
- 1983 - Hardy Vision
- 1984 - Dyna Shoot
- 1985 - Daishin Fubuki
- 1986 - Hokuto Helios
- 1987 - Shino Cross
- 1988 - Doctor Spurt
- 1989 - Sakura Saezuri
- 1990 - Big Fight
- 1991 - Yamanin Miracle
- 1992 - Meiner Castle
- 1993 - Yamanin Ability
- 1994 - Go Go Nakayama
- 1995 - Adjudicator
- 1996 - Meiner Max
- 1997 - Grass Wonder
- 1998 - Umeno Fiber
- 1999 - Daiwa Carson

== See also ==
- Horse racing in Japan
- List of Japanese flat horse races
