= Silk Road Stakes =

Silk Road Stakes シルクロードステークス
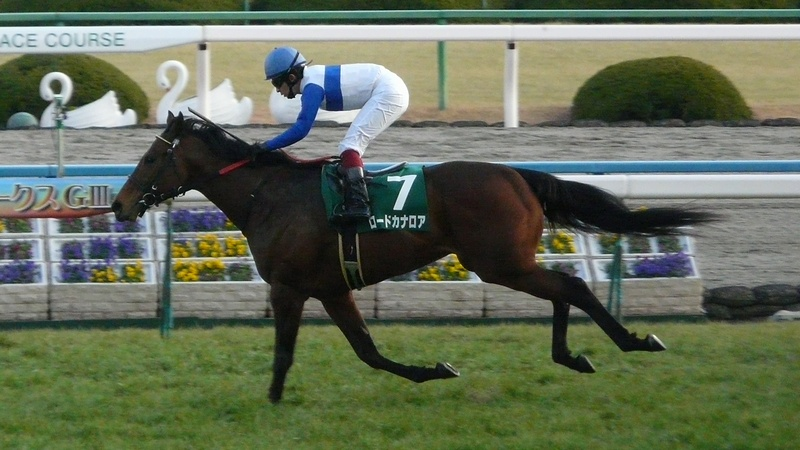
- Lord Kanaloa win the 2012 Silk Road Stakes
- Class: Grade 3
- Location: Kyoto Racecourse
- Inaugurated: 1996
- Race type: Thoroughbred Flat racing

Race information
- Distance: 1200 metres
- Surface: Turf
- Track: Right-handed
- Qualification: 4-y-o+
- Weight: Handicap
- Purse: ¥ 87,960,000 (as of 2026): 1st: ¥ 41,000,000; 2nd: ¥ 16,000,000; 3rd: ¥ 10,000,000

The Silk Road Stakes (Japanese シルクロードステークス) is a Grade 3 horse race in Japan for Thoroughbreds aged four and over, run in January over a distance of 1200 metres on turf at Kyoto Racecourse.

The Silk Road Stakes was first run as a graded race in 1996 with Grade 3 status, and has held on to that status ever since.

== Past winners ==
Year	Winner	Age	Jockey	Trainer	Owner	Time
1996	Flower Park	4	Seiki Tabara	Shoichi Matsumoto	Katsumi Yoshida	1:07.6
1997	Eishin Berlin	5	Katsumi Minai	Masanori Sakaguchi	Toyomitsu Hirai	1:06.9
1998	Seeking the Pearl	3	Yutaka Take	Hideyuki Mori	Masako Uenaka	1:08.6
1999	Meiner Love	4	Mikio Matsunaga	Ryuichi Inaba	Thoroughbred Club Ruffian	1:08.7
2000	Broad Appeal	6	Koshiro Take	Kunihide Matsuda	Makoto Kaneko	1:09.5
2001	Trot Star	5	Masayoshi Ebina	Eiji Nakano	Minoru Takano	1:08.7
2002	Gaily Flash	9	Tetsuya Kobayashi	Isao Yasuda	Tokyo Thoroughbred Bureau	1:08.7
2003	T M Sunday	7	Shinichiro Akiyama	Masaru Fukushima	Masatsugu Takezono	1:08.6
2004	Keeneland Swan	6	Andreas Suborics	Hideyuki Nori	Toyomitsu Hirai	1:08.6
2005	Precious Cafe	5	Masayoshi Ebina	Futoshi Kojima	Koichi Nishikawa	1:08.1
2006	Tamamo Hot Play	5	Kunihiko Watanabe	Katsumi Minai	Tamamo	1:08.9
2007	M O Winner	6	Futoshi Komaki	Toshiyuki Hattori	Mitsugu Oasa	1:07.8
2008	Fine Grain	5	Hideaki Miyuki	Hiroyuki Nagahama	Shadai Race Horse	1:09.1
2009	Urban Street	5	Yuichi Fukunaga	Akihiko Nomura	Shigeki Goto	1:08.5
2010	Ultima Thule	6	Norihiro Yokoyama	Masashi Okuhira	Shadai Race Horse	1:08.1
2011	Jo Cappuccino	5	Kota Fujioka	Kazuya Nakatake	Keiko Ueda	1:08.2
2012	Lord Kanaloa	4	Yuichi Fukunaga	Takayuki Yasuda	Lord Horse Club	1:08.3
2013	Dream Valentino	6	Kohei Matsuyama	Tadashi Kayo	Saison Race Horse	1:08.6
2014	Straight Girl	5	Yasunari Iwata	Hideaki Fujiwara	Toshihiro Hirosaki	1:07.4
2015	Am Ball Bleiben	6	Ken Tanaka	Nobuharu Fukushima	Nobuyuki Ito	1:07.9
2016	Dance Director	6	Suguru Hamanaka	Kazuhide Sasada	Suzuko Ota	1:07.9
2017	Dance Director	7	Yutaka Take	Kazuhide Sasada	Suzuko Ota	1:07.8
2018	Fine Needle	5	Yuga Kawada	Yoshitada Takahashi	Mohammed bin Rashid Al Maktoum	1:08.3
2019	Danon Smash	4	Yuichi Kitamura	Takayuki Yasuda	Danox	1:08.3
2020	A Will A Way	4	Yuga Kawada	Tomokazu Takano	Katsumi Yoshida	1:09.0
2021*	Shivaji	6	Yuichi Fukunaga	Kenji Nonaka	Kanayama Holdings	1:08.3
2022*	Meikei Yell	4	Kenichi Ikezoe	Hidenori Take	Nagoya Keiba	1:08.1
2023*	Namura Clair	4	Suguru Hamanaka	Kodai Hasegawa	Nobushige Namura	1:07.3
2024	Lugal	4	Atsuya Nishimura	Haruki Sugiyama	Yoshimasa Ema	1:07.7
2025	A Shin Fencer	5	Kenji Kawamata	Keiji Yoshimura	Eishindo	1:08.2
2026	Fioraia	5	Keisuke Dazai	Masato Nishizono	Yushun Horse Co., Ltd.	1:08.0

*The 2021, 2022, and 2023 races took place at Chukyo Racecourse.

== Previous Silk Road Stakes ==
From 1989 to 1995, a listed race of the same name was held at Kyoto Racecourse. The race was held over a distance of 1600m in 1989 while the race in subsequent years were held at 1200m.

Year	Winner	Age	Jockey	Trainer	Time
1989	Shiyono Roman	4	Yutaka Take	Hozumi Shono	1:35.7
1990	Eiko Caesar	5	Yutaka Take	Isao Yasuda	1:10.9
1991	Meisho Machina	4	Yoshiyasu Tajima	Nao Takahashi	1:09.9
1992	Yuki Top Run	4	Yutaka Take	Masaru Sayama	1:09.4
1993	Yuki Top Run	5	Hiroshi Kawachi	Masaru Sayama	1:09.5
1994	Gold Mountain	5	Koichi Tsunoda	Masaru Sayama	1:08.8
1995	Gold Mountain	6	Shigehiko Kishi	Masaru Sayama	1:07.9

== See also ==
- Horse racing in Japan
- List of Japanese flat horse races
