= Satono Reve =

Japanese thoroughbred racehorse

Satono Reve; サトノレーヴ
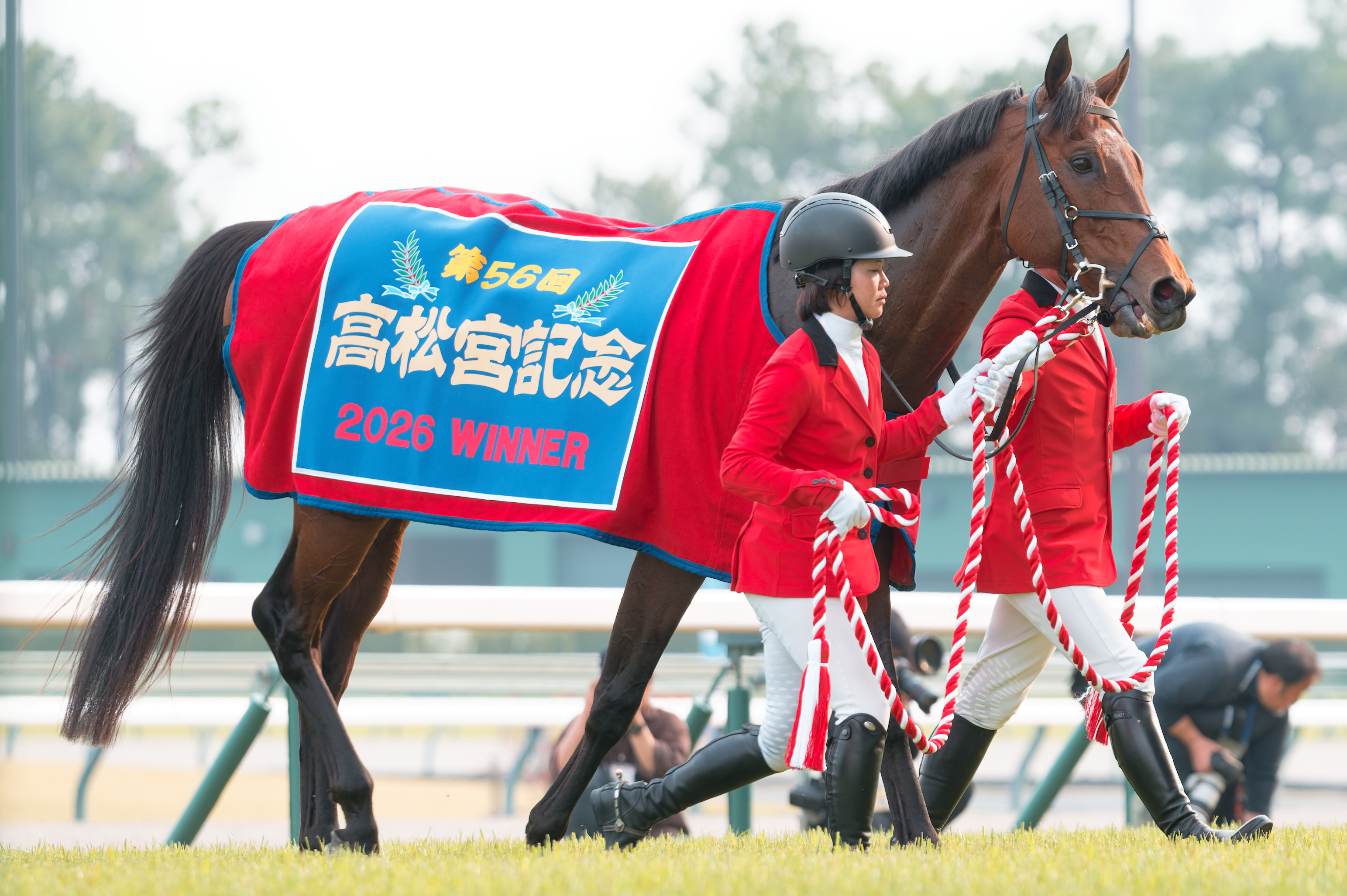
- Satono Reve after winning the 2026 Takamatsunomiya Kinen
- Breed: Thoroughbred
- Sire: Lord Kanaloa
- Grandsire: King Kamehameha
- Dam: Ciliege
- Damsire: Sakura Bakushin O
- Sex: Stallion
- Foaled: March 22, 2019 (age 7)
- Country: Japan
- Colour: Bay
- Breeder: Shirai Farm
- Owner: Hajime Satomi
- Racing colours
- Trainer: Noriyuki Hori
- Jockey: Joao Moreira
- Record: 21: 9-5-2
- Earnings: 899,053,200 JPY (Note: Earnings earned overseas are converted to JPY using the formula provided by JRA. 2025, 2026.); JPN: 544,196,000 JPY; HK: 12,650,000 HKD; UK: 516,080 GBP

Major wins
- Takamatsunomiya Kinen (GI, 2025, 2026); Hakodate Sprint Stakes (GIII, 2024); Keeneland Cup (GIII, 2024)

Awards
- JRA Award for Best Sprinter (2025)
- Last updated on July 11, 2026

Satono Reve (サトノレーヴ, 里見夢境, born March 22, 2019) is a Japanese thoroughbred racehorse. His major victories include the 2025 and 2026 Takamatsunomiya Kinen, the 2024 Hakodate Sprint Stakes, and the 2024 Keeneland Cup. The horse's name is derived from the prefix 'Satono' + 'dream' (French: rêve).

== Background ==
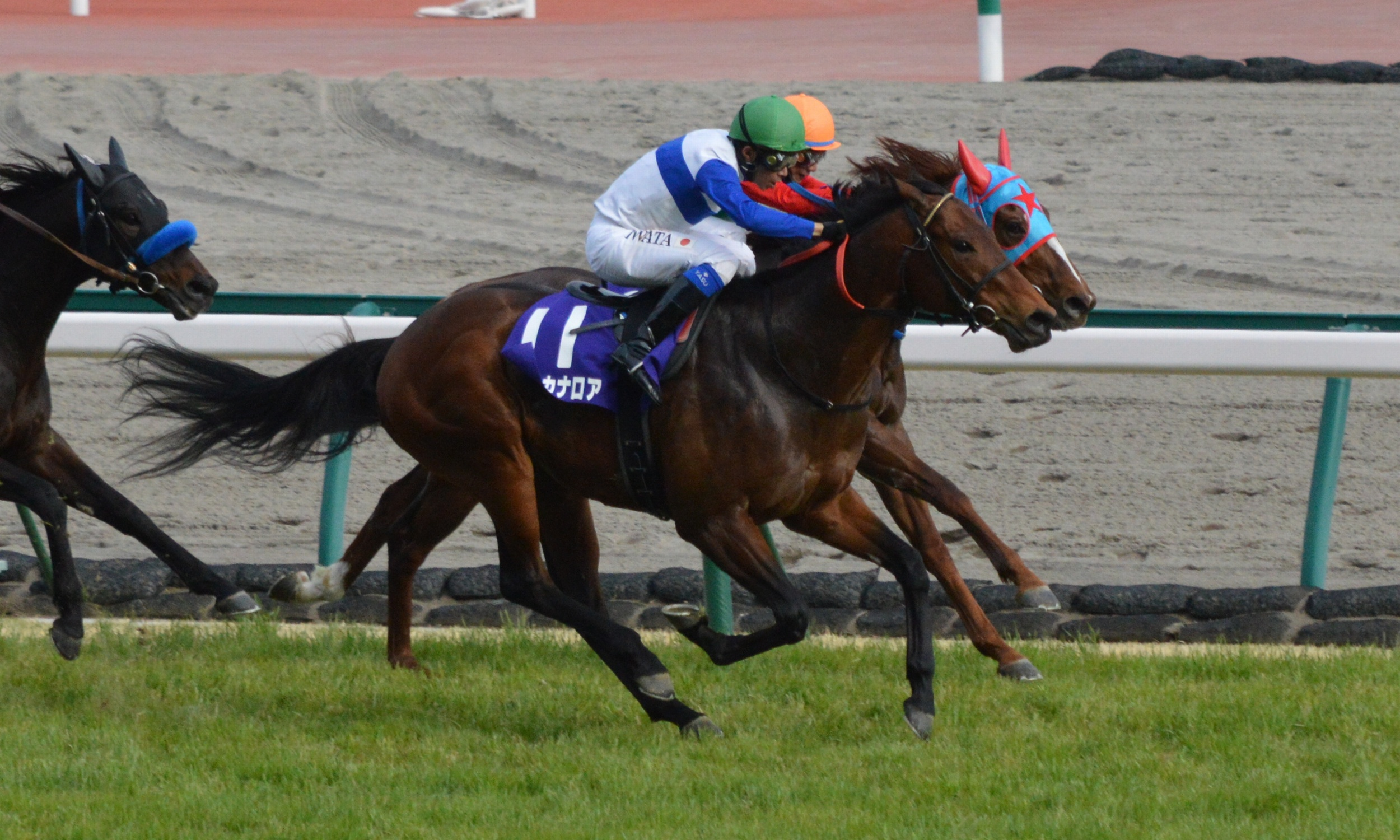
Lord Kanaloa (front, green helmet), Satono Reve's father, in the 2013 Takamatsunomiya Kinen

Satono Reve was born on March 22, 2019, at Shirai Farm in Hidaka, Hokkaido. His dam, Ciliege, was a progeny of two time Sprinters Stakes winner Sakura Bakushin O. His sire, Lord Kanaloa, is also a JRA Hall of Fame inductee who won the Sprinters Stakes twice in his career, and had also gone on to win the Hong Kong Sprint twice as well.

On July 2019, he was auctioned at the JRHA Select Sale and was bought by Satomi Horse Company Co., Ltd for 54 million yen (Note: Approximately 367,000 USD as of October 2, 2025.) (excluding tax). Afterwards, he was brought into training under Noriyuki Hori at the Miho Training Center.

== Racing career ==
=== 2022: Three-year-old season ===
Satono Reve's debut was late; he made his first appearance on April 10, 2022, at Nakayama on the turf over 1600 meters in a race for three-year-old maidens, ridden by Shu Ishibashi. He stayed in second place during the race, took the lead in the stretch, and held off a challenge from Iwakuni, who came from mid-pack, by half a length to win his debut. In the Oshamanbe Tokubetsu on July 2, he stayed in mid-pack before making his move on the outside in the straight but was narrowly beaten by Rakiata, who went ahead, finishing second. After a one-week break, in the July 17 race at Hakodate on turf over 1200 meters for three-year-old and above, he saved his energy in third place and overtook Hinokuni, who tried to hold the lead, in the final stretch to secure his second win. On October 1, in the Katsuura Tokubetsu, he tracked in second, made his move in the straight, and pulled away to win his third race by two lengths.

=== 2023-2024: Four to five-year-old season ===
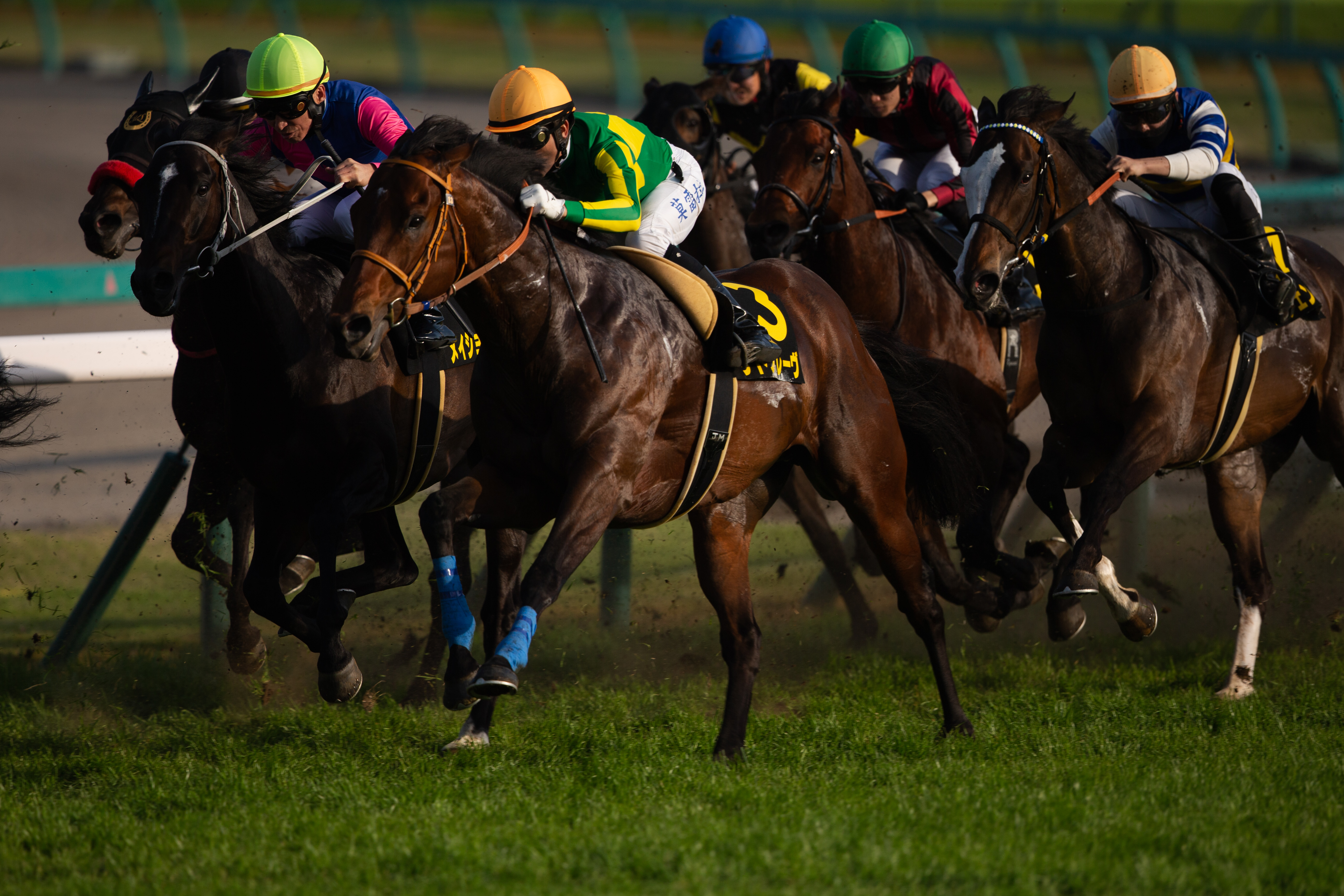
Satono Reve (front, orange helmet) at the 2024 Shunrai Stakes

In the Suzaku Stakes on April 29, 2023, which marked his first race as a four-year-old, he ran tenaciously from a good position and took the lead, ultimately winning his fourth race by half a length over Il Cuore who had set the pace, thereby entering the open class. However, he subsequently went on a long-term break due to injury.

Satono Reve returned in the GIII Hankyu Hai on February 25, 2024, and raced in second and third position but could not finish strongly in the stretch, ending up in fourth place. On April 14, in the listed Shunrai Stakes, he made a sharp move from mid-pack in the final stretch and narrowly defeated Thermal Wind, who was closing from a good position, to achieve his first open-class victory. On June 9, in the GIII Hakodate Sprint Stakes, he tracked in fourth or fifth position before breaking through from the inside in the stretch, ultimately winning comfortably by 1 1/4 lengths over Win Greatest, marking his first graded race victory.

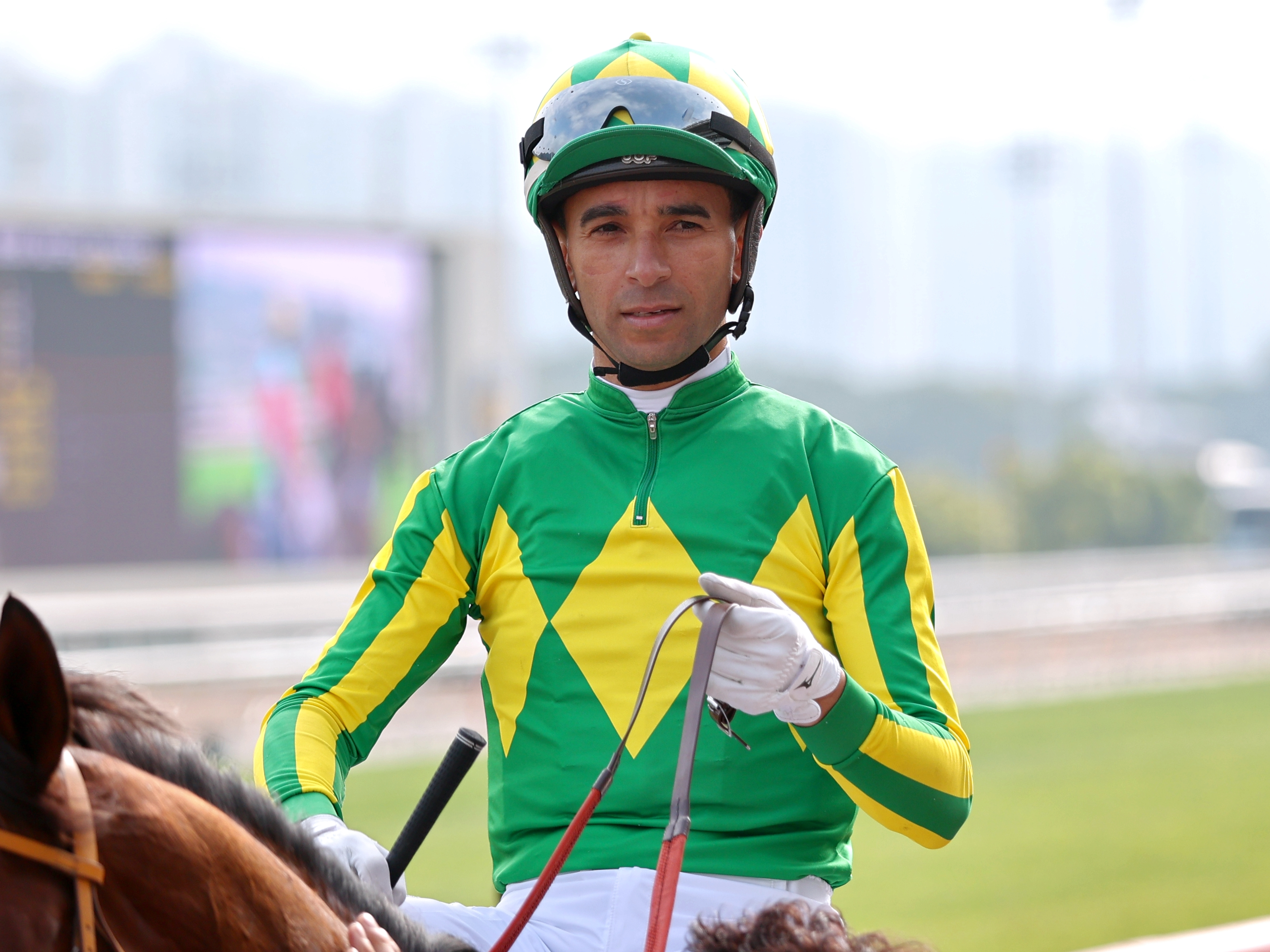
João Moreira riding Satono Reve during the Hong Kong Sprint

On August 25, in the Keeneland Cup, a trial race for the Sprinters Stakes, he ran in a good position and accelerated strongly in the final stretch, winning by 1 1/2 lengths over Eishin Spotter and achieving consecutive graded race victories. On September 30, in his first GI challenge at the Sprinters Stakes, he was the favourite but finished seventh due to a poor start.

In his final race of the year on December 8, in the Hong Kong Sprint, he stayed in mid-pack on the inside and showed a strong finish in the stretch, but could not catch the overwhelming favourite Ka Ying Rising and was overtaken from the outside by Helios Express, finishing third.

=== 2025: Six-year-old season ===
Satono Reve's six-year-old season began with the Takamatsunomiya Kinen on March 30. Staying in the middle of the pack during the race, he broke through the field in the final stretch and held off Namura Clair by three-quarters of a length to win. This marked his first Group One victory and the father-son triumph with his sire, Lord Kanaloa.

However, jockey João Moreira received a warning for veering outward in the final straight, affecting Namura Clair. Next, he ran in the Chairman's Sprint Prize at Sha Tin Racecourse in Hong Kong on April 27. Following closely behind Ka Ying Rising at the fourth corner, he tried to make a move but was overtaken in the straight, finishing second by two and a quarter lengths.

Afterward, it was decided to move on to the Queen Elizabeth II Jubilee Stakes at Ascot Racecourse in England on June 21. On May 3, Satono Reve arrived at Heathrow Airport from Hong Kong via Dubai and then moved to James Horton’s stable in Newmarket, Suffolk for his stay. In the race, continuing with the partnership with João Moreira, it started from the far outside gate 16 but delivered a strong performance, finishing second by half a length behind the winner, Lazaat. This was only the second time in 25 years that a Japanese horse finished in the top two at Royal Ascot since Agnes World (however, the King’s Stand Stakes in which Agnes World placed was classified as G2 at the time and was promoted to G1 only in 2008. Therefore, if limited to G1 races at Royal Ascot, Satono Reve is the first Japanese horse in history to achieve this).

Satono Reve's next race would be the 2025 Sprinters Stakes, where he started as the first favourite but came fourth behind Namura Clair, June Blair and Win Carnelian. In the end of the year, Satono Reve entered the Hong Kong Sprint for the second time but ended up in frustrating ninth place where the defending champion Ka Ying Rising defeated his competition and earned his 16th consecutive victory. His jockey, Ryan Moore, noted that the horse was in good condition and calm but the pace of the race increased rapidly, causing them to lose out early and thus not allowing them to finish in their usual style. At the end of the season, Satono Reve was awarded the JRA Award for Best Sprinter or Miler.

After that his trainer were thinking about Satono Reve becoming stallion at the end of the year, but at the end were decided to extend his career for one more year to win the titles that he couldn't win last year. As Kento Watanabe said during JRA Award Ceremony, January 26, 2026:

"Reflecting the trainer’s desire to keep him racing for another year, win the titles he missed out on last year, and pave the way for his career as a stallion, Satono Reve will continue to race this year as well." (Note: Original text: 「もう1年現役を続けて、昨年取れなかったタイトルを取り、種牡馬への道を切り開きたいという調教師の思いもあり、サトノレーヴは今年も現役を続行します。」)

=== 2026: Seven-year-old season ===
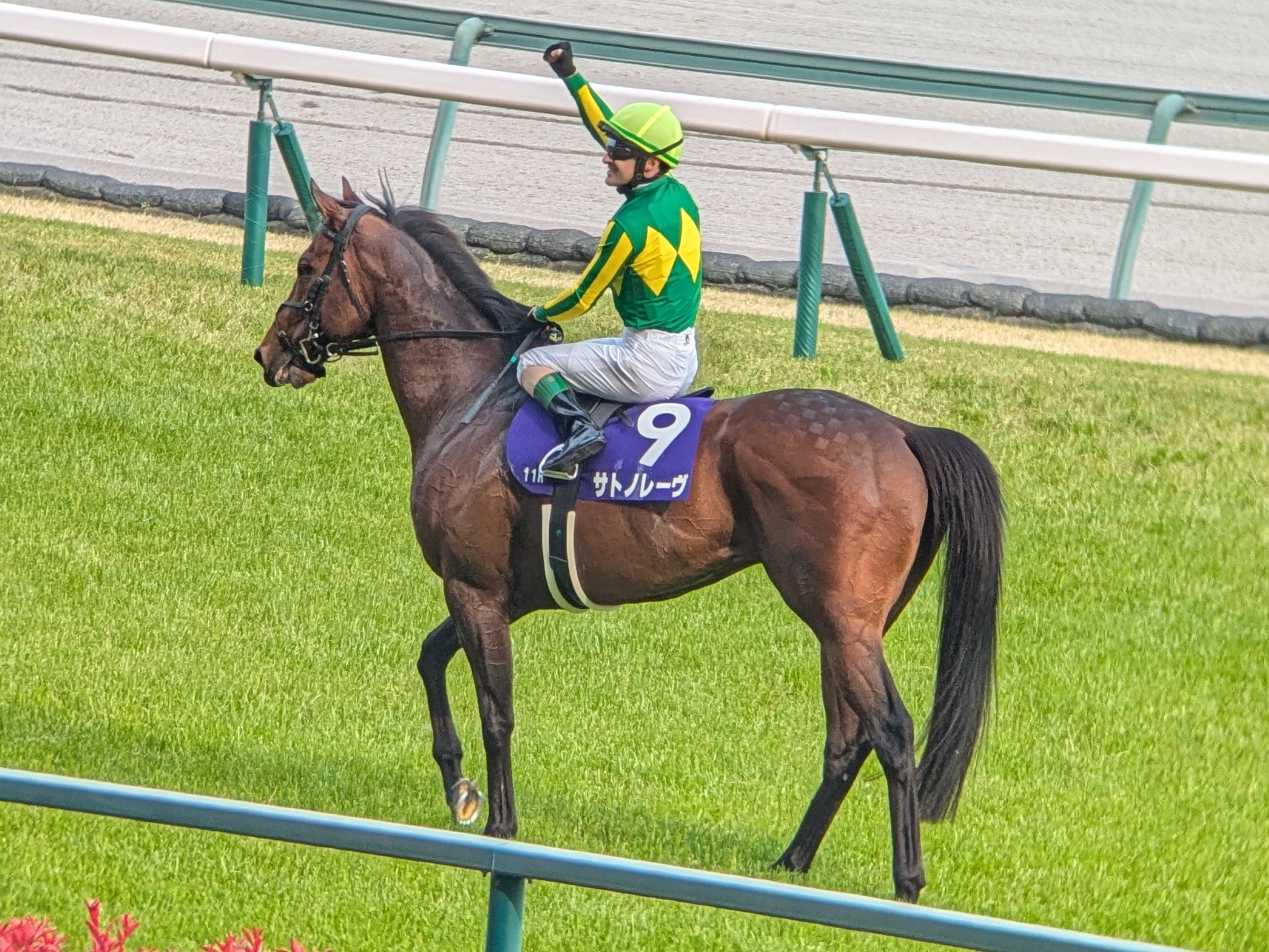
Satono Reve after winning the 2026 Takamatsunomiya Kinen

For his first race as a seven-year-old he ran in the Takamatsunomiya Kinen, which he had won the previous year. It was his first partnership with Christophe Lemaire, and he became the race favorite.

Despite an extremely fast early pace of 32.5 seconds for the first three furlongs, he raced in middle of the pack as usual. Breaking away from the field in the home stretch, he powered home with a final three-furlong split of 32.4 seconds to win by two lengths in a race-record time of 1:06.3. That was first Takamatsunomiya Kinen victory for Christophe Lemaire on his fifth attempt.

Lemaire commented his first Takamatsunomiya Kinen victory with praise for Satono Reve:

"Once again, Satono Reve proved just how strong he really is. In the stretch, he took the bit himself, switched leads, and was fast from there on. He broke well and secured a good position. I expected a fast pace, but even from a midfield spot, I wasn't concerned. He relaxed nicely around the fourth turn and travelled in his own rhythm. He finished strongly in the stretch. He’s a top-level sprinter who has achieved results overseas and has a wealth of experience. Physically, he truly has the build of a sprinter. I think he can deliver more good results in G1 races this year. This was my first win in the Takamatsunomiya Kinen. It took some time, but I haven't had many chances to ride in this race. I'm very happy to win it with such a strong horse.” (Note: Original text:「改めて、サトノレーヴは本当に強かったです。直線では自分でハミを取って、手前を替えて、そのあとは速かったです。スタートが良く、好きなポジションが取れました。速いペースだと思ったので、ミドルポジションから、心配はしていませんでした。馬は、コーナーで息が入り、自分のリズムで走れました。直線に入ってからよく走っていました。トップレベルのスプリンターで、海外でも結果を出しましたし、たくさん経験があります。フィジカルとしても、本当にスプリンターの体です。今年もGIレベルで結果を出すことができると思います。僕は高松宮記念を勝つのは初めてです。時間はかかりましたが、チャンスがそれほどありませんでしたから、今日は強い馬で勝つことができました。うれしいです」)

He became only the second horse in history to win this race two years in a row, following Kinshasa no Kiseki, the horse who was also trained by Noriyuki Hori.

As it then was found that Satono Reve had lost a horseshoe on his left hind leg during race, but still managed to beat a race-record time.

About participating in Hong Kong race again this year Yu Yamashita said:

"It was discovered that he had lost a horseshoe on his left hind leg during the race, so a decision on whether to run in the Chairman’s Sprint Prize (April 26, Sha Tin, Hong Kong), for which an invitation has been accepted, will be made after assessing his condition." (Note: Original text:「レース中に左後肢の落鉄があり、招待を受諾しているチェアマンズスプリントプライズ(4月26日、香港・シャティン)への出走は、状態を見極めてからの判断になる」)

Satono Reve did ran at the Chairman's Sprint Prize one month later. When the gate open, he ran well in the middle and accelerating after the final corner but he was no match for Ka Ying Rising once again, losing to him by four and quarter lengths behind. Moreira who was back jockeying him this time said after the race:

"He's a horse that runs with such effort, like a true warrior. This time he was up against what could be called the world's best sprinter, but I'm happy with his performance." (Note: Original text: 「本当に一生懸命走ってくれる、まさに戦士のような馬。今回は世界一のスプリンターと言える相手に当たってしまったけど、彼のパフォーマンスには満足しています」)

As his next international goal was chosen to participate in the Queen Elizabeth II Jubilee Stakes at Ascot Racecourse in England on June 20, where he finished second last year. On May 3rd he arrived at Heathrow Airport via a direct flight from Hong Kong and was transferred to the Newmarket stable of James Horton. With other Japanese horse Lugal they both targeted the Queen Elizabeth II Jubilee Stakes to possibly win it for the first time for Japan.

In the race he became the second favorite and got off to a good start and settled well off the pace in around fourth place. Regional and Overpass set the pace, with Australian mare Joliestar following them. With the late race approaching, Satono Reve, under Ryan Moore, rushed forward and accelerated sharply, overtaking the now leading Joliestar, ridden by James McDonald. At the same time local trained horse Almeraq overtook Joliestar from the other side, and the two horses finished side by side in an extremely close photo finish that turned into a four-way battle between horses representing different countries. It was announced that Almeraq had finished ahead of Satono Reve by a nose, while Joliestar finished head short behind Satono Reve and French-trained Stolen Kiss head behind Joliestar. Satono Reve had suffered a heartbreaking runner-up finish for the second straight year in this race.

Ryan Moore commented after the race:

"He ran a very good race. He was in excellent condition. We had to wait a while in the stalls, but he broke strongly and showed good speed. It was an unlucky defeat, but he fought all the way to the line." (Note: Original text: 「とてもいいレースをしてくれた。コンディションも良かった。ゲートで待たされたが、いいスピードで力強く出てくれた。アンラッキーな負け方だったが、最後までファイトしてくれた」)

After his participation in Queen Elizabeth II Jubilee Stakes he was offered a spot in The Everest (October 17, Randwick Racecourse, Australia), but the offer was declined. Instead, on July 6, it was announced that he would compete in the July Cup (July 11, Newmarket Racecourse, England), with Lemaire set to partner him.

In the July Cup he became the first favorite to win, and got off to a good start. After the first furlong he took the lead over the nine-horse pack in the center of the field, similar to how Agnes World ran this race 26 years ago. Long-shot Comanche Brave, ridden by Billy Loughnane, targeted Satono Reve and followed him in the early stages of the race. At the fourth furlong Satono Reve accelerated and moved into first place. However, on two final furlongs Comanche Brave surged decisively forward and overtook him. Satono Reve's early acceleration on a difficult uphill section of the course caused him to lose his strength toward the end, and he had to fight with everything he had to hold his position but was passed by the second favorite, Venetian Sun, and finished third, losing by just a neck.

About the race Lemaire said:

"He was a bit distracted by what was going on around him. Even so, he ran with a beautiful stride, and the race itself wasn’t bad, but he couldn’t shift into high gear as much as I’d hoped, and he lacked that final burst of speed." (Note: Original text: 「周りを気にするところがありました。それでも奇麗なストライドで走ってレースの内容自体は悪くなかったけど思ったほどギアが上がらず、最後の伸びを欠いてしまいました」)

After the July Cup, Satono Reve raced the City of York Stakes on August 22, but finished 9th. After returning to Japan his connections announced that Satono Reve would be retired to stand stud at Shadai Stallion Station, with the horse planned to be sent there directly once his quarantine was finished.

== Racing form ==
Satono Reve has run in 20 races and won nine of them with seven placed finishes. This data is based on JBIS, netkeiba, SCMP, SkySports and British Horseracing Authority.

Date	Distance (Condition)	Race	Class	Course	Field	HN	Odds (Favored)	Finish	Time	Winning (Losing) Margin	Jockey	Winner (2nd Place)	Ref
2022 – three-year-old season
Apr 10	1600 m (Firm)	Three Year Old		Nakayama	16	8	2.0 (1)	1st	1:34.6	1/2 length	Shu Ishibashi	(Iwakuni)	
Jul 2	1200 m (Good)	Oshamambe Tokubetsu	1 Win	Hakodate	14	5	3.4 (2)	2nd	1:09.7	(head)	Suguru Hamanaka	Raketa	
Jul 17	1200 m (Soft)	Three Year Old and Up	1 Win	Hakodate	15	8	2.1 (1)	1st	1:12.3	1 length	Suguru Hamanaka	(Hinokuni)	
Oct 1	1200 m (Firm)	Katsuura Tokubetsu	2 Win	Nakayama	14	8	2.7 (1)	1st	1:07.7	2 lengths	Suguru Hamanaka	(Morino Dream)	
2023 – four-year-old season
Apr 29	1200 m (Firm)	Suzaku Stakes	3 Win	Kyoto	18	12	2.2 (1)	1st	1:07.7	1/2 length	Suguru Hamanaka	(Il Cuore)	
2024 – five-year-old season
Feb 25	1400 m (Soft)	Hankyu Hai	GIII	Hanshin	18	9	8.2 (4)	4th	1:21.6	(2 1/4 lengths)	Ryoya Kozaki	Win Marvel	
Apr 14	1200 m (Firm)	Shunrai Stakes	L	Nakayama	16	13	1.9 (1)	1st	1:07.1	head	Joao Moreira	(Thermal Wind)	
Jun 9	1200 m (Firm)	Hakodate Sprint Stakes	GIII	Hakodate	16	4	3.6 (2)	1st	1:08.4	1 1/4 lengths	Suguru Hamanaka	(Win Greatest)	
Aug 25	1200 m (Firm)	Keeneland Cup	GIII	Sapporo	16	10	4.3 (2)	1st	1:07.9	1 1/2 lengths	Damian Lane	(A Shin Spotter)	
Sep 29	1200 m (Firm)	Sprinters Stakes	GI	Nakayama	16	12	3.0 (1)	7th	1:07.4	(2 1/4 lengths)	Damian Lane	Lugal	
Dec 8	1200 m (Good)	Hong Kong Sprint	G1	Sha Tin	14	9	12.5 (3)	3rd	1:08.27	(3/4 length)	Joao Moreira	Ka Ying Rising	
2025 – six-year-old season
Mar 30	1200 m (Firm)	Takamatsunomiya Kinen	GI	Chukyo	18	10	3.8 (2)	1st	1:07.9	3/4 length	Joao Moreira	(Namura Clair)	
Apr 27	1200 m (Good)	Chairman's Sprint Prize	G1	Sha Tin	13	2	6.4 (2)	2nd	1:08.23	(2 1/4 lengths)	Joao Moreira	Ka Ying Rising	
Jun 21	6f (Good to Firm)	Queen Elizabeth II Jubilee Stakes	G1	Ascot	14	11	3.0 (1)	2nd	1:11.3	(1/2 length)	Joao Moreira	Lazzat	
Sep 28	1200 m (Firm)	Sprinters Stakes	GI	Nakayama	16	7	2.2 (1)	4th	1:07.2	(1 3/4 lengths)	Joao Moreira	Win Carnelian	
Dec 14	1200 m (Firm)	Hong Kong Sprint	G1	Sha Tin	13	2	15.7 (2)	9th	1:08.98	(8 lengths)	Ryan Moore	Ka Ying Rising	
2026 – seven-year-old season
Mar 29	1200 m (Firm)	Takamatsunomiya Kinen	GI	Chukyo	18	9	3.5 (1)	1st	R1:06.3	2 lengths	Christophe Lemaire	(Red Mon Reve)	
Apr 26	1200 m (Good)	Chairman's Sprint Prize	G1	Sha Tin	8	2	90.0 (2)	2nd	1:07.77	(4 1/4 lengths)	Joao Moreira	Ka Ying Rising	
Jun 20	6f (Good to Firm)	Queen Elizabeth II Jubilee Stakes	G1	Ascot	19	14	4.0 (2)	2nd	1:11.8	(nose)	Ryan Moore	Almeraq	
Jul 11	6f (Good to Firm)	July Cup	G1	Newmarket	11	7	3.0 (1)	3rd	1:10.2	(1 1/4 lengths)	Christophe Lemaire	Comanche Brave	
Aug 22	7f (Good to Soft)	City of York Stakes	G1	York	14	8	13.0 (6)	9th	1:25.97	(6 lengths)	Joao Moreira	Notable Speech	

- R indicates that it was a record time finish

Legend:
Turf

== Pedigree ==
Pedigree of Satono Reve, bay stallion, 2019
Sire Lord Kanaloa(JPN) b. 2008	King Kamehameha b. 2001	Kingmambo	Mr. Prospector
Sire Lord Kanaloa(JPN) b. 2008	King Kamehameha b. 2001	Kingmambo	Miesque
Sire Lord Kanaloa(JPN) b. 2008	King Kamehameha b. 2001	Manfath	Last Tycoon
Sire Lord Kanaloa(JPN) b. 2008	King Kamehameha b. 2001	Manfath	Pilot Bird
Sire Lord Kanaloa(JPN) b. 2008	Lady Blossom b. 1996	Storm Cat	Storm Bird
Sire Lord Kanaloa(JPN) b. 2008	Lady Blossom b. 1996	Storm Cat	Terlingua
Sire Lord Kanaloa(JPN) b. 2008	Lady Blossom b. 1996	Saratoga Dew	Cormorant
Sire Lord Kanaloa(JPN) b. 2008	Lady Blossom b. 1996	Saratoga Dew	Super Luna
Dam Cilege(JPN) ch. 2001	Sakura Bakushin O b. 1989	Sakura Yutaka O	Tesco Boy
Dam Cilege(JPN) ch. 2001	Sakura Bakushin O b. 1989	Sakura Yutaka O	Angelica
Dam Cilege(JPN) ch. 2001	Sakura Bakushin O b. 1989	Sakura Hagoromo	Northern Taste
Dam Cilege(JPN) ch. 2001	Sakura Bakushin O b. 1989	Sakura Hagoromo	Clear Amber
Dam Cilege(JPN) ch. 2001	Megami Guerlain b. 1992	Shady Heights	Shirley Heights
Dam Cilege(JPN) ch. 2001	Megami Guerlain b. 1992	Shady Heights	Vaguely
Dam Cilege(JPN) ch. 2001	Megami Guerlain b. 1992	Mogami Guelain	Mogami
Dam Cilege(JPN) ch. 2001	Megami Guerlain b. 1992	Mogami Guelain	Miss Guelain

- Satono Reve's half brother, Hakusan Moon, won the three graded races, most notably the 2013 Centaur Stakes where he beat Lord Kanaloa, Satono Reve's sire.
