= Kosei Miura =

Japanese jockey (born 1989)

Kousei Miura
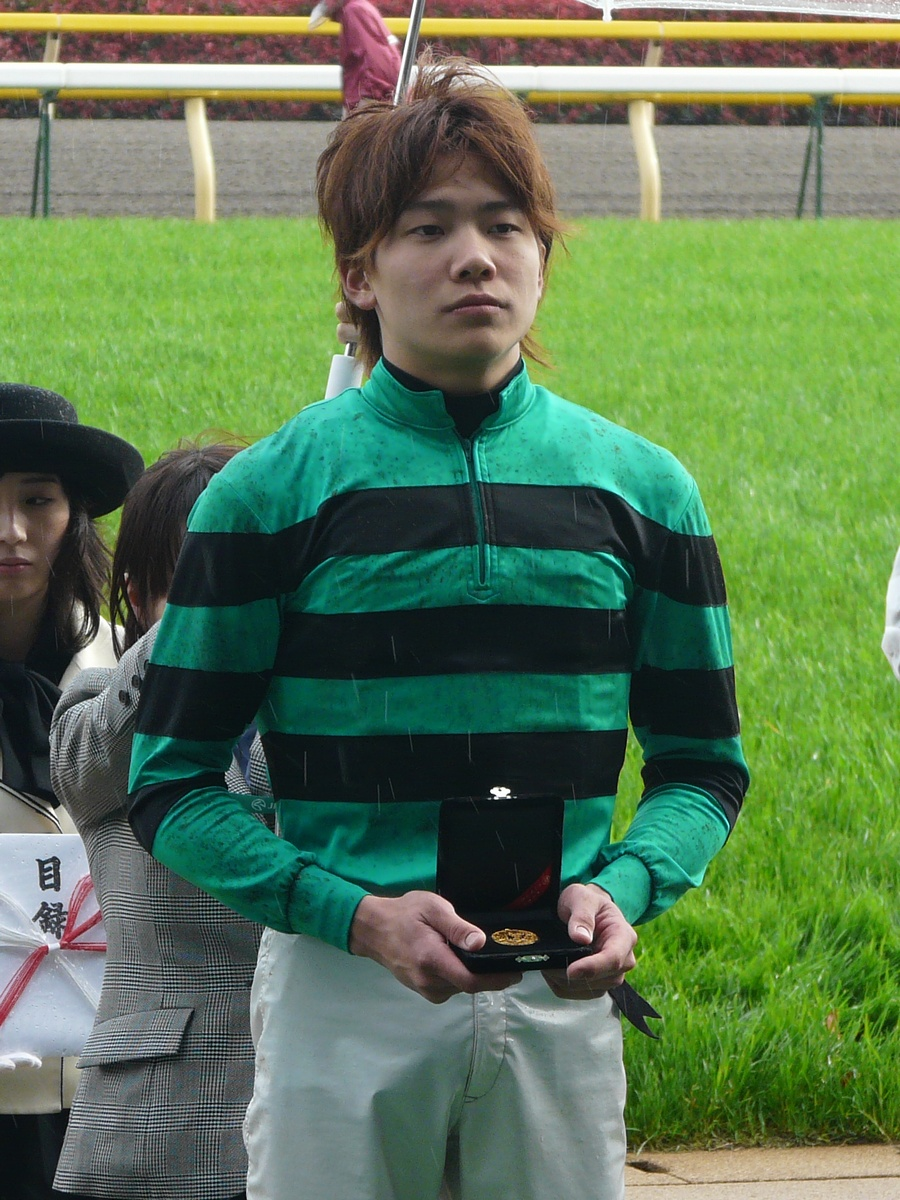
- Kousei Miura at the 2011 Flora S ceremony

Personal information
- Native name: 三浦皇成
- Nationality: Japanese
- Born: December 19, 1989 (age 36) Nerima, Tokyo, Japan
- Occupation: Jockey
- Height: 167 cm (5 ft 6 in)
- Weight: 50 kg (110 lb)
- Spouse: Aki Hoshino (m. 2011)
- Children: 1

Horse racing career
- Sport: Horse racing

Racing awards
- JRA Award for Best Jockey (newcomer) (2008)

Kousei Miura (三浦 皇成, Miura Kōsei; born December 19, 1989, in Nerima, Tokyo, Japan) is a Japanese jockey who is affiliated with the Japan Racing Association. He won the 2008 JRA Award for Newcomer Jockey with the Most Victories after winning 91 races in a single year as a rookie jockey, surpassing Yutaka Take's previous record of 69 victories.

Miura has also been awarded the 2014 Hokkaido Horse Racing Press Club Award.

Miura won his first Grade I race at the JRA in the 2025 Sprinters Stakes with Win Carnelian.
