= Hajime Satomi =

Japanese businessman (born 1942)

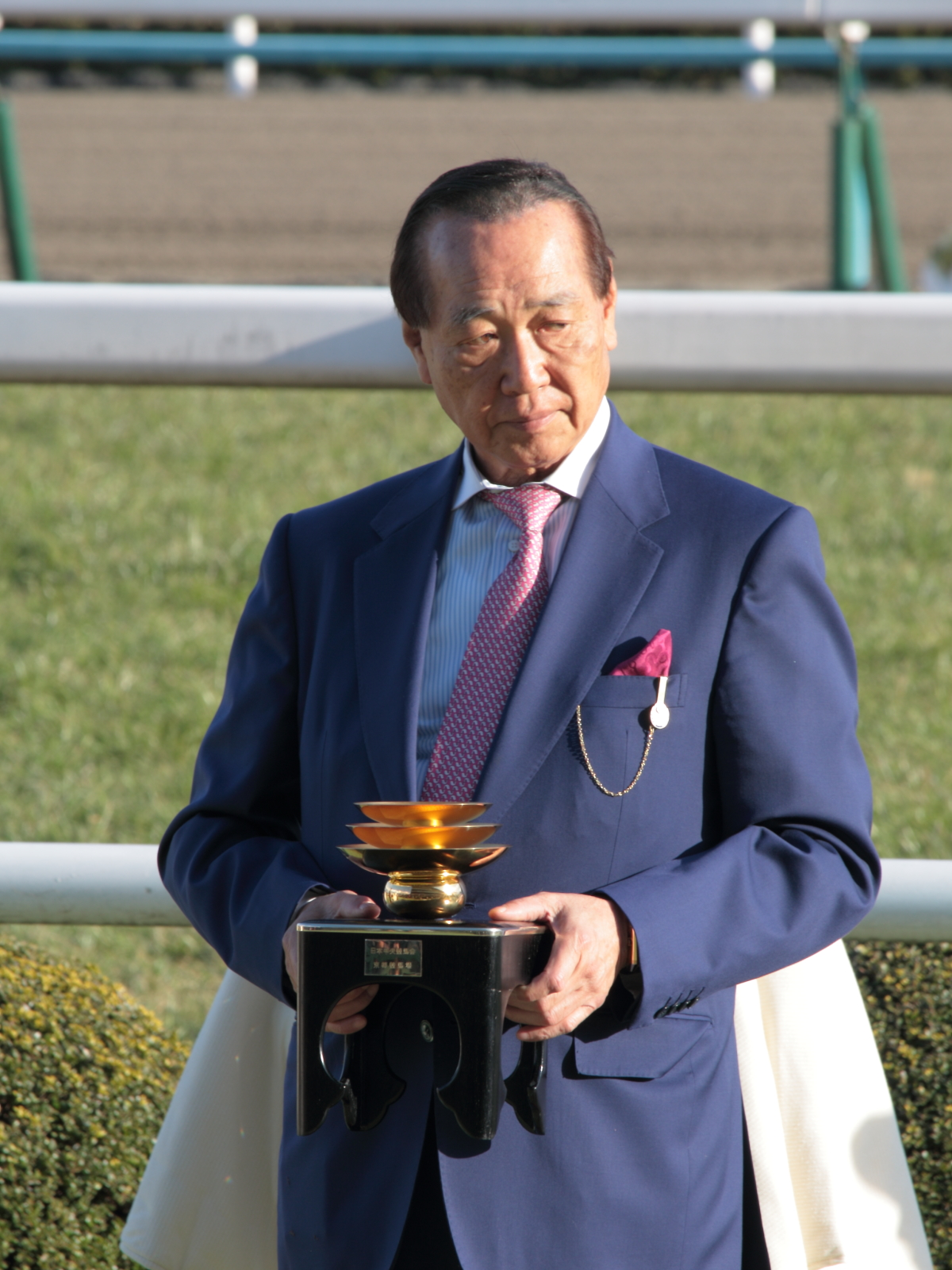
- Hajime Satomi at the 56th Kisaragi Sho award ceremony on February 7, 2016
- Born: January 16, 1942 (age 84); Fukushima, Gunma, Empire of Japan
- Occupations: Chairman, Sega Sammy Holdings
- Years active: 1964–present
- Children: Haruki Satomi

Hajime Satomi (里見 治, Satomi Hajime; born January 16, 1942) is a Japanese businessman. Satomi is known as the founder of Sammy Corporation, which merged with the Japan-based video game and arcade game producer Sega to form the holding company Sega Sammy Holdings. He is among the 50 richest people in Japan, and is a top-ranked owner of Thoroughbred horses, such as Satono Diamond.

== History ==
Hajime Satomi withdrew from Aoyama Gakuin University in November of 1975 and founded Sammy Corporation.

Sammy experienced significant growth when it began manufacturing machines for the pachislot and pachinko industry (one of Japan's most popular forms of gambling) and was successfully listed on the First Section of the Tokyo Stock Exchange in March 2001. Sammy Corporation is now the leading manufacturer of pachislot and pachinko machines.

With 22% shares bought in 2003, Sammy then bought a controlling share 1.1 billion dollars in Sega in 2004. Hajime Satomi heads the newly combined $4.5 billion (sales) group, now called Sega Sammy Holdings Inc. with its main businesses being those of Sammy Corporation and Sega Corporation. He succeeded Hisao Oguchi, who became vice chairman and chief creative officer of the new board. Satomi's interest in Sega came from his relationship with the previous owner of Sega, Isao Okawa, who helped him stay afloat during difficult times and gave Satomi a 8 billion yen loan, from which Satomi never missed a payment. Okawa being impressed, asked if he could do something about Sega.

Satomi played a role in managing Sega IP at times. Talking to Sega employees in the first years of Sega Sammy, he ensured to Toshihiro Nagoshi that he will be able to release Yakuza when it was not fully greenlit by Sega. He also was persistent into getting the Sonic the Hedgehog movie franchise started.

Son of Hajime Satomi, Haruki Satomi, succeeded his father in the year of 2017 as Representative Director, President and COO, fully stepping down from the CEO role in 2021. Haruki's decision to sell Sega's arcade location business in 2022 was not something Hajime would have done, but he did not intervene, delegating key decisions to his son.

== Incident with yakuza ==
In January 2015, a shooting incident occurred at the residence of Satomi. The incident took place at approximately 8:35 AM and was reported to the Tokyo Metropolitan Police by a security guard who heard gunfire and discovered three unused bullet casings at the scene. Security camera footage captured two individuals on a motorcycle near the residence around the time of the incident. Tokyo police arrested Takahiro Yamamoto, a 54-year-old member of the Kobe Yamaguchi-gumi, a faction of the Yamaguchi-gumi, Japan's largest yakuza syndicate. Authorities accused Yamamoto of firing a single bullet at Satomi's residence and discarding additional ammunition at the scene. Investigators believe that Yamamoto ordered Takao Matsushima and Hiroaki Yoshikawa to carry out the crime. Both individuals were subsequently arrested and interrogated by police. The motive behind the attack remains unclear, whether the intent was to harm Satomi or serve as an act of intimidation.
