= Kohei Matsuyama =

Japanese jockey (born 1990)

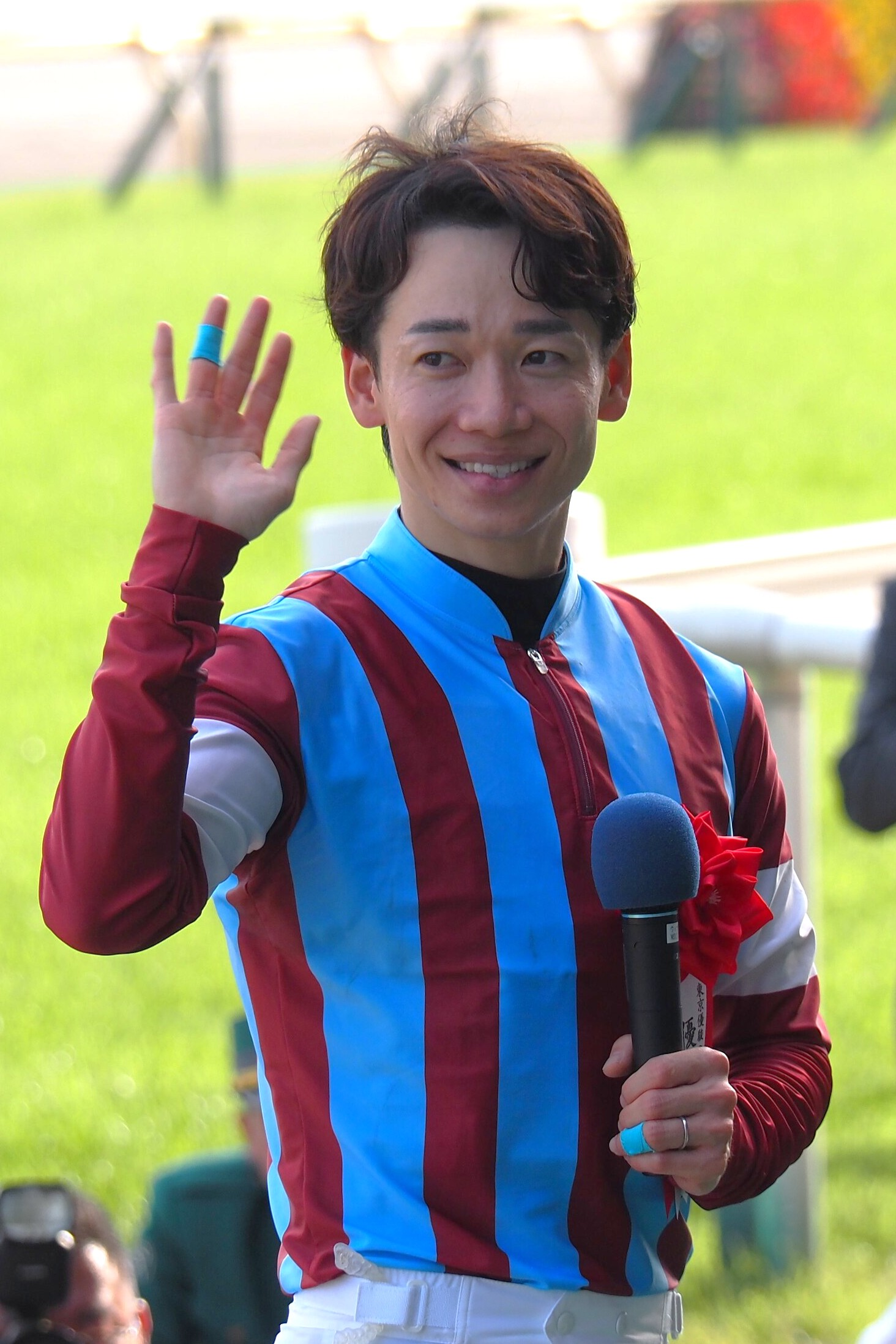
- Matsuyama after the 2026 Tokyo Yushun

Personal information
- Native name: 松山弘平
- Born: March 1, 1990 (age 36) Kobe, Hyogo, Japan
- Height: 167 cm (5 ft 6 in)
- Weight: 47 kg (104 lb)

Horse racing career
- Sport: Horse racing
- Career wins: 1312 (JRA); 31 (NAR)

Major racing wins
- Satsuki Shō, Oka Sho, Yushun Himba, Tokyo Yushun, Shūka Sho, Champions Cup, NHK Mile Cup, Hanshin Juvenile Fillies, Hopeful Stakes

Racing awards
- JRA Best Jockey (Newcomer) (2009); Most Valuable Jockey (2023)

Significant horses
- Al Ain, Daring Tact, T O Keynes, Outrange, Icon Tailor, Panja Tower, Star Anise, Lovcen

Kohei Matsuyama (松山弘平; born March 1, 1990) is a Japanese jockey.

== Early life ==
Matsuyama developed an interest in the sport after his father and grandfather, who were horse racing fans, took him to watch horse racing at Hanshin Racecourse. Matsuyama would go on to enroll in the JRA's Horse Racing School in 2006, before graduating in 2009 and acquiring his jockey license.

== Career ==
Matsuyama rode and won his first race when he rode Tomiken Primary at a maiden race held in Kokura Racecourse on March 1, 2009. He was awarded the JRA Best Jockey (Newcomer) in that year's JRA Award.

Matsuyama won his first graded race when he won the Chunichi Shimbun Hai with Smart Gear on March 4, 2012.

In 2015, Matsuyama won his first JpnI race when he won the Japan Breeding Farms' Cup Sprint with Corin Berry.

Matsuyama won his first Grade I race when he won the Satsuki Shō in 2017 with Al Ain, with this victory also marking the first jockey born in the Heisei era to win a Grade I race in Japan.

In 2020, Matsuyama won the Japanese Triple Tiara when he rode Daring Tact to win all three legs of the Tiara.

== Major wins ==
- Champions Cup - T O Keynes (2021)
- Hanshin Juvenile Fillies - Star Anise (2025)
- Hopeful Stakes - Lovcen (2025)
- Japan Breeding Farms' Cup Classic - T O Keynes (2022), Outrange (2026)
- Japan Breeding Farms' Cup Sprint - Corin Berry (2015)
- Japan Breeding Farms' Cup Ladies' Classic - Icon Tailor (2023)
- NHK Mile Cup - Panja Tower (2025)
- Oka Sho - Daring Tact (2020), Star Anise (2026)
- Satsuki Shō - Al Ain (2017), Lovcen (2026)
- Shūka Sho - Daring Tact (2020)
- Teio Sho - T O Keynes (2021)
- Tōkyō Yūshun - Lovcen (2026)
- Yushun Himba - Daring Tact (2020)
