= Marvelous Crown =

Japanese-bred Thoroughbred racehorse

Marvelous Crown; マーベラスクラウン
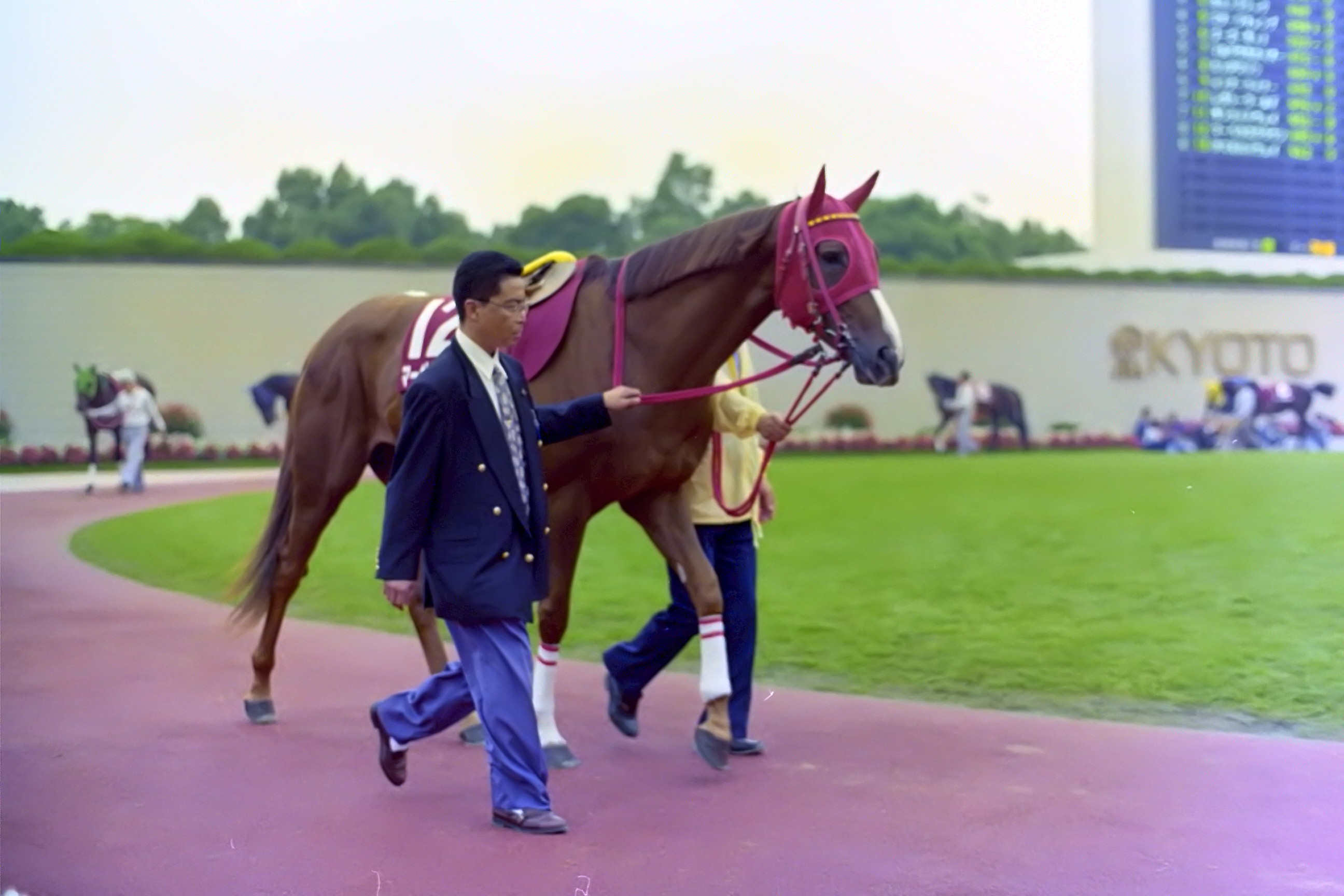
- Marvelous Crown at Kyoto Racecourse in 1995
- Sire: Miswaki
- Grandsire: Mr. Prospector
- Dam: Maurita
- Damsire: Harbor Prince
- Sex: Gelding
- Foaled: 19 March 1990
- Country: Japan
- Colour: Chestnut
- Breeder: Hayata Bokujo
- Owner: Sadao Sasahara
- Racing colours
- Trainer: Makoto Osawa
- Jockey: Katsumi Minai
- Record: 22: 7-5-2
- Earnings: ¥412,928,000

Major wins
- Kinko Sho (1994); Kyoto Daishoten (1994); Japan Cup (1994)

Marvelous Crown (Japanese: マーベラスクラウン, 19 March 1990 – 2 June 2007) was a Japanese Thoroughbred racehorse best known for winning the 1994 Japan Cup. He showed promise as a juvenile in 1992 but became increasingly temperamental and was gelded. After castration his temperament became calmer and on his return to the racetrack ten months later he quickly won three of his four races in the following year. As a four-year-old he showed steady improvement, winning the Grade III Kinko Sho and the Grade II Kyoto Daishoten before defeating a strong international field in the Japan Cup. He remained in training until 1997 but made only five more appearances before his career was ended by injury. He died in 2007.

== Background ==
Marvelous Crown was a chestnut gelding with a white blaze bred in Japan by Hayata Bokujo. He was sired by Miswaki, a Florida-bred stallion who won the Prix de la Salamandre in 1980. Miswaki went on to become a very successful breeding stallion, siring many important winners including Urban Sea and Black Tie Affair. Marvelous Crown's dam Maurita was a New Zealand-bred mare who won the New Zealand Oaks in 1982 and also produced the Hollywood Turf Handicap-winner Grand Flotilla.

During his racing career Marvelous Crown was owned by Sadao Sasahara and trained by Makoto Osawa.

== Racing career ==
=== 1992: two-year-old season ===
Marvelous Crown began his racing career by winning a maiden race over 1200 metres on the dirt at Hanshin Racecourse on 19 September 1992. When moved up in distance to 1600 metres and switched to turf at Kyoto Racecourse in October he finished third to Biwa Hayahide a colt who was voted Japanese Horse of the Year in the following year. In his two other starts in 1992, Marvelous Crown finished fourth at Kyoto in November and second when moved up to 2000 metres at Hanshin in December. Marvelous Crown began to show serious behavioural problems and was becoming dangerous to handle: his owner therefore took the decision to have him gelded.

=== 1993: three-year-old season ===
As a gelding, Marvelous Crown was ineligible to contest many of the major Japanese races for three-year-olds including the Satsuki Sho, Tokyo Yushun and Kikuka Sho. He did not appear as a three-year-old until 16 October 1993 when he won a race over 1600 metres at Kyoto, beating Center the Eagle and fourteen others. At the same track in November he won the Kitaoji Tokubetsu and the Hiei Stakes, both over 2000 metres. On his final appearance of the season he was moved up in class and distance for the Grade II Naruo Kinen over 2500 metres at Hanshin on 11 December and finished second of the sixteen runners behind Roubles Act.

=== 1994: four-year-old season ===
At Hanshin in January 1994 Marvelous Crown finished second to Eishin Tennessee in the Grade III Sports Nippon Sho Kim Pai over 2000 metres and then ran fourth over 2500 metres in the Grade II NIkkei Shinshun Hai. Later in spring he finished second to North Flight in the Yomiuri Milers Cup at Chukyo Racecourse, sixth in the Sankei Osaka Hai and second to Golden Hour in the Niigata Daishoten. After six consecutive defeats the gelding recorded his first major success when he defeated Fuji One Man Cross, Towa Darling and seven others in the Grade III Tokai TV Hai Kinko Sho over 1800 metres at Chukyo on 19 June. At the same course in July he ended the first part of his four-year-old campaign by finishing third to Nice Nature and Star Ballerina in the Takamatsunomiya Hai.

On 9 October Marvelous Crown was one of ten horses to contest the Grade II Kyoto Daishoten over 2500 metres at Hanshin. He won from Ayrton Symboli and Machikane Allegro in a record time of 2:31.0. The thirteenth running of the Japan Cup at Tokyo Racecourse saw four Japanese-trained horses face ten challengers from abroad in front of 165,930 spectators. The North American challenge comprised Sandpit (the 7/2 favourite), Paradise Creek, Fraise, Grand Flotilla (Marvelous Crown's older half-brother) and Johann Quatz (winner of the Prix Lupin when trained in France). The European contingent comprised Hernando, Apple Tree (Grand Prix de Saint-Cloud, Coronation Cup) and Raintrap (Canadian International Stakes). The other overseas runners were Jeune from Australia and Rough Habit from New Zealand. Starting at odds of 9.6/1 Marvelous Crown, with Katsumi Minai in the saddle, was the most fancied of the Japanese horses ahead of Royce and Royce, Nice Nature and Fujiyama Kenzan. Sandpit went to the front in the early stages and established a clear lead as Minai settled Marvelous Crown on the inside in third place alongside Johann Quatz and Fujiyama Kenzan. Sandpit gave way in the straight and Paradise Creek took the lead from Royce and Royce, but Marvelous Crown continued to make along the rail. The Japanese gelding caught the American challenger in the final stride and won by a nose with Royce and Royce taking third ahead of Hernando. Hinai admitted "I was not sure if I won until I saw the scoreboard".

=== 1995, 1996 & 1997: later career ===
Marvelous Crown remained in training but made few appearances and never threatened to repeat his form of 1994. As a five-year-old his best effort in three races was finishing fourth behind Kanetsu Cross in the Naruo Kinen. He returned after an absence of a year to run sixth on dirt at Urawa in December 1996 and was pulled-up with an injury on his final start at Funabashi on 27 January 1997.

Marvelous Crown did not race again and lived in retirement in Hokkaido before dying on 2 June 2007 at the age of seventeen.

== Racing form ==
The following racing form is based on information available on JBIS search and netkeiba.

Date	Track	Race	Grade	Distance (Condition)	Entry	HN	Odds (Favored)	Finish	Time	Margins	Jockey	Winner (Runner-up)
1992 – two-year-old season
Sep 19	Hanshin	2YO debut		1200m（Fast）	10	8	2.3（1）	1st	1:14.6	–0.3	Katsumi Minai	(Shirokita Arashi)
Oct 10	Kyoto	Momiji Stakes	OP	1600m（Firm）	10	1	10.8（4）	3rd	1:34.6	0.3	Katsumi Minai	Biwa Hayahide
Nov 1	Kyoto	Kigiku Sho	ALW (1W)	1600m（Firm）	15	6	1.7（1）	4th	1:36.2	0.4	Katsumi Minai	Sanei Kid
Dec 5	Hanshin	Erica Sho	ALW (1W)	2000m（Firm）	8	1	2.8（2）	2nd	2:04.2	0.3	Katsumi Minai	Wako Chikako
1993 – three-year-old season
Oct 16	Kyoto	Horikawa Tokubetsu	ALW (1W)	1600m（Firm）	16	8	3.7（2）	1st	1:34.1	0.0	Mikio Matsunaga	(Center the Eagle)
Nov 6	Kyoto	Kitaoji Tokubetsu		2000m（Firm）	13	6	2.0（1）	1st	2:00.0	0.0	Mikio Matsunaga	(Power Shinzan)
Nov 20	Kyoto	Hiei Stakes		2000m（Firm）	11	7	2.4（1）	1st	2:01.6	–0.1	Mikio Matsunaga	(Hokusetsu Ginga)
Dec 11	Hanshn	Naruo Kinen	2	2500m（Firm）	16	15	2.9（1）	2nd	2:36.3	0.0	Mikio Matsunaga	Roubles Act
1994 – four-year-old season
Jan 5	Hanshin	Kyoto Kimpai	3	2000m（Firm）	16	7	2.4（1）	2nd	2:03.0	0.2	Mikio Matsunaga	Eishin Tennessee
Jan 23	Hanshin	Nikkei Shinshun Hai	2	2500m（Firm）	16	16	3.0（1）	4th	2:36.5	1.0	Mikio Matsunaga	Monsieur Siecle
Mar 6	Chukyo	Yomiuri Milers Cup	2	1700m（Firm）	11	7	7.2（3）	2nd	1:40.6	0.0	Katsumi Minai	North Flight
Apr 3	Hanshin	Sankei Osaka Hai	2	2000m（Firm）	14	8	3.6（2）	6th	2:02.0	0.8	Katsumi Minai	Nehai Caesar
May 15	Niigata	Niigata Daishoten	3	2200m（Firm）	14	7	2.1（1）	2nd	2:15.2	0.1	Katsumi Minai	Golden Hour
Jun 19	Chukyo	Kinko Sho	3	1800m（Good）	10	10	2.2（1）	1st	1:48.1	–0.2	Katsumi Minai	(Fuji One Man Cross)
Jul 10	Chukyo	Takamatsunomiya Hai	2	2000m（Firm）	13	6	6.2（4）	3rd	2:00.9	0.2	Yutaka Take	Nice Nature
Oct 9	Hanshin	Kyoto Daishoten	2	2500m（Firm）	10	3	5.4（3）	1st	R2:31.0	0.0	Katsumi Minai	(Ayrton Symboli)
Nov 27	Tokyo	Japan Cup	1	2400m（Firm）	14	4	10.6（6）	1st	2:23.6	0.0	Katsumi Minai	(Paradise Creek)
1995 – five-year-old season
Oct 8	Kyoto	Kyoto Daishoten	2	2400m（Firm）	13	12	10.4（3）	10th	2:26.1	0.8	Katsumi Minai	Hishi Amazon
Nov 19	Kyoto	Mile Championship	1	1600m（Firm）	18	2	19.9（7）	16th	1:35.5	1.8	Seiki Tabara	Trot Thunder
Dec 9	Hanshin	Naruo Kinen	2	2500m（Firm）	12	12	12.2（5）	4th	2:32.1	0.8	Seiki Tabara	Kanetsu Cross
1996 – six-year-old season
Dec 4	Urawa	Urawa Kinen	Grade-1	2000m（Fast）	9	7	0.0（6）	6th	2:08.8	3.3	Takaharu Kuwajima	Hokuto Vega
1997 – seven-year-old season
Jan 27	Funabashi	Hochi Grand Prix Cup	Grade-1	1800m（Fast）	12	11	0.0（7）	DNF	–	–	Takashi Harita	Kikuno Win

Legend:
Turf Dirt

- R meant it was a track record finish

== Pedigree ==
Pedigree of Marvelous Crown (JPN), chestnut gelding 1990
Sire Miswaki (USA) 1978	Mr. Prospector (USA); 1970	Raise a Native	Native Dancer
Sire Miswaki (USA) 1978	Mr. Prospector (USA); 1970	Raise a Native	Raise You
Sire Miswaki (USA) 1978	Mr. Prospector (USA); 1970	Gold Digger	Nashua
Sire Miswaki (USA) 1978	Mr. Prospector (USA); 1970	Gold Digger	Sequence
Sire Miswaki (USA) 1978	Hopespringseternal (USA); 1971	Buckpasser	Tom Fool
Sire Miswaki (USA) 1978	Hopespringseternal (USA); 1971	Buckpasser	Busanda
Sire Miswaki (USA) 1978	Hopespringseternal (USA); 1971	Rose Bower	Princequillo
Sire Miswaki (USA) 1978	Hopespringseternal (USA); 1971	Rose Bower	Lea Lane
Dam Maurita (NZ) 1978	Harbor Prince (USA); 1969	Prince John	Princequillo
Dam Maurita (NZ) 1978	Harbor Prince (USA); 1969	Prince John	Not Afraid
Dam Maurita (NZ) 1978	Harbor Prince (USA); 1969	Hornpipe	Hornbeam
Dam Maurita (NZ) 1978	Harbor Prince (USA); 1969	Hornpipe	Sugar Bun
Dam Maurita (NZ) 1978	Cathmoi (NZ); 1972	Alvaro	Rockefella
Dam Maurita (NZ) 1978	Cathmoi (NZ); 1972	Alvaro	Aldegonde
Dam Maurita (NZ) 1978	Cathmoi (NZ); 1972	Untried	The Summit
Dam Maurita (NZ) 1978	Cathmoi (NZ); 1972	Untried	Cordial (Family 13-a)

- Marvelous Crown was inbred 4 × 4 to Princequillo, meaning that this stallion appears twice in the fourth generation of his pedigree.
