= Vega (horse) =

Japanese Thoroughbred racehorse (1990–2006)

Vega ベガ
- Breed: Thoroughbred
- Sire: Tony Bin
- Grandsire: Kampala
- Dam: Antique Value
- Damsire: Northern Dancer
- Sex: Mare
- Foaled: 8 March 1990
- Died: 16 August 2006 (aged 16)
- Country: Japan
- Color: Bay
- Breeder: Shadai Farm
- Owner: Kazuko Yoshida
- Racing colors
- Trainer: Hiroyoshi Matsuda
- Jockey: Yutaka Take
- Record: 9: 4-1-1
- Earnings: ¥300,771,000

Major wins
- Japanese Classic Tiara Race wins: Oka Sho (1993); Yushun Himba (1993)

Awards
- JRA Award for Best Three-Year-Old Filly (1993)

Vega (Japanese: ベガ, Hepburn: Bega, 8 March 1990 – 16 August 2006) was a Japanese Thoroughbred racehorse who won the first two legs of the Japanese Triple Tiara, the Oka Sho and the Yushun Himba on 1993. She was also known for being the dam of the 1999 Tōkyō Yūshun winner, Admire Vega.

== Background ==
Vega was born on March 8, 1990, on Shadai Farm. She was sired by Tony Bin, an influential sire who also sired other notable Japanese racehorses such as Air Groove, Jungle Pocket, and North Flight. Her dam, Antique Value, was sired by Northern Dancer, who was known as one of the most important sires in the history of Thoroughbred racing.

== Racing Record ==
Vega was active from 1993 to 1994 where she competed in a total of 9 races and placed in 1st place four times. Below is her racing statistics taken from netkeiba.

Date	Race	Grade	Distance	Surface	Track	Field	Finish	Time	Margin	Jockey	Winner (Runner-up)
1993 – four-year-old season
Jan 9	4YO Debut		1800m	Turf	Kyoto	16	2nd	1:49.5	0.4	Yoshizumi Hashimoto	Princess Mail
Jan 24	4YO Debut		2000m	Turf	Kyoto	15	1st	2:02.5	-0.7	Yutaka Take	(Kyowa Je T'Aime)
Mar 13	Tulip Sho	OP	1600m	Turf	Hanshin	16	1st	1:36.8	-0.5	Yutaka Take	(Belle Charmante)
Apr 11	Oka Sho	G1	1600m	Turf	Hanshin	18	1st	1:37.2	0.0	Yutaka Take	(Yukino Bijin)
May 23	Yushun Himba	G1	2400m	Turf	Tokyo	18	1st	2:27.3	-0.3	Yutaka Take	(Yukino Bijin)
Nov 14	Queen Elizabeth 2 Commemorative Cup	G1	2400m	Turf	Kyoto	18	3rd	2:25.4	0.4	Yutaka Take	Hokuto Vega
Dec 26	Arima Kinen	G1	2500m	Turf	Nakayama	14	9th	2:32.3	1.4	Yutaka Take	Tokai Teio
1994 – five-year-old season
Apr 3	Sankei Osaka Hai	G2	2000m	Turf	Hanshin	14	9th	2:02.2	1.0	Yutaka Take	Nehai Caesar
Jun 12	Takarazuka Kinen	G1	2200m	Turf	Hanshin	14	13th	2:14.9	3.7	Yutaka Take	Biwa Hayahide

== Pedigree ==
Pedigree of Vega, bay mare, 1990
Sire Tony Bin 1983	Kampala; 1976	Kalamoun	Zeddaan
Sire Tony Bin 1983	Kampala; 1976	Kalamoun	Khairunissa
Sire Tony Bin 1983	Kampala; 1976	State Pension	Only For Life
Sire Tony Bin 1983	Kampala; 1976	State Pension	Lorelei
Sire Tony Bin 1983	Severn Bridge; 1965	Hornbeam	Hyperion
Sire Tony Bin 1983	Severn Bridge; 1965	Hornbeam	Thicket
Sire Tony Bin 1983	Severn Bridge; 1965	Priddy Fair	Preciptic
Sire Tony Bin 1983	Severn Bridge; 1965	Priddy Fair	Campanette
Dam Antique Value 1979	Northern Dancer; 1961	Nearctic	Nearco
Dam Antique Value 1979	Northern Dancer; 1961	Nearctic	Lady Angela
Dam Antique Value 1979	Northern Dancer; 1961	Natalma	Native Dancer
Dam Antique Value 1979	Northern Dancer; 1961	Natalma	Almahmoud
Dam Antique Value 1979	Moonscape; 1967	Tom Fool	Menow
Dam Antique Value 1979	Moonscape; 1967	Tom Fool	Gaga
Dam Antique Value 1979	Moonscape; 1967	Brazen	Bold Ruler
Dam Antique Value 1979	Moonscape; 1967	Brazen	Amoret

== Breeding records ==
	Birth Year	Name	Sex	Color	Sire	Trainer	Owner	Major Wins
1	1996	Admire Vega	Stallion	Bay	Sunday Silence	Mitsuru Hashida	Riichi Kondo	Tōkyō Yūshun, Kyoto Shimbun Hai, Radio Tampa Hai Sansai Stakes
2	1997	Admire Boss	Stallion	Dark Bay	Sunday Silence	Mitsuru Hashida	Riichi Kondo	St Lite Kinen
3	1999	Admire Don	Stallion	Bay	Timber Country	Hiroyoshi Matsuda	Riichi Kondo	February Stakes, Asahi Hai Futurity Stakes, Japan Breeding Farms' Cup Classic (3 times), Teio Sho, Mile Championship Nambu Hai, Elm Stakes
4	2000	(Stillborn)	-	-	Sunday Silence	-	-	-
5	2003	Captain Vega	Stallion	Dark Bay	Sunday Silence	Hiroyoshi Matsuda	Kazuko Yoshida	5 wins out of 45 starts
6	2005	Historic Star	Mare	Bay	Falbrav	-	-	Unraced, foaled Harp Star
