= North Flight =

Japanese-bred Thoroughbred racehorse (1990–2018)

North Flight ノースフライト
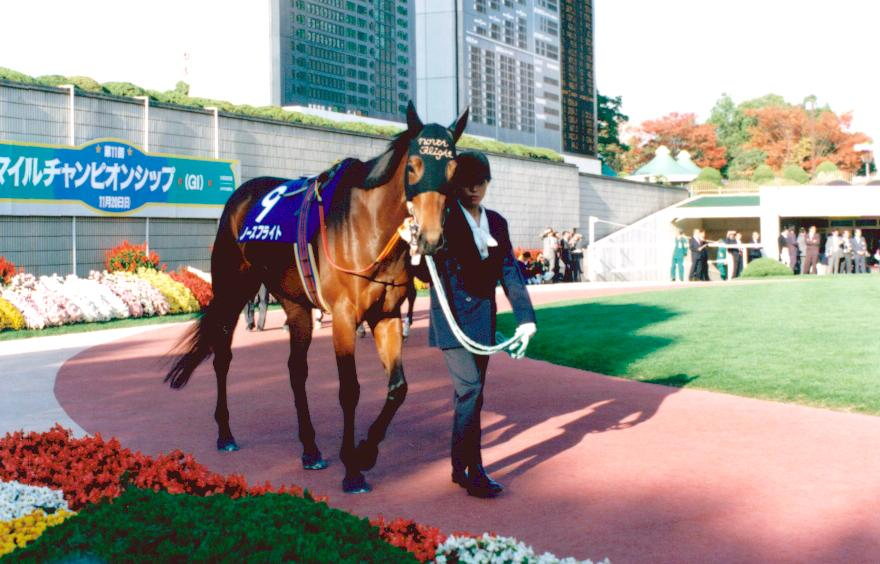
- North Flight at the parade ring of the 1994 Mile Championship
- Breed: Thoroughbred
- Sire: Tony Bin
- Grandsire: Kampala
- Dam: Shadai Flight
- Damsire: Hitting Away
- Sex: Mare
- Foaled: 12 April 1990
- Died: 22 January 2018 (aged 27)
- Country: Japan
- Color: Bay
- Breeder: Taihoku Stud Co., Ltd.
- Owner: Taihoku Farm Co. Ltd.
- Racing colors
- Trainer: Keiji Kato
- Jockey: Masato Nishizono; Yutaka Take; Koichi Tsunoda
- Record: 11: 8-2-0
- Earnings: ¥458,094,000

Major wins
- Fuchu Himba Stakes (1993); Hanshin Himba Tokubetsu (1993); Kyoto Himba Tokubetsu (1994); Yomiuri Milers Cup (1994); Yasuda Kinen (1994); Mile Championship (1994)

Awards
- JRA Award for Best Older Filly or Mare (1994)

North Flight (Japanese: ノースフライト, Hepburn: Nōsu Furaito; 12 April 1990 – 22 January 2018) was a Japanese Thoroughbred racehorse and broodmare. She made her debut in the Japan Racing Association in 1993. The following year, in 1994, she won the Yasuda Kinen and the Mile Championship and was named the JRA Award for Best Older Filly or Mare that same year. In particular, she posted a perfect 5-for-5 record in mile races, earning her the title “Queen of the Mile,” and was affectionately known to fans as “Fuu-chan.” After retiring from racing in 1995, she became a broodmare. Although none of her offspring achieved significant success as racehorses, her son, Miscast, sired Beat Black, who won the 2012 Tenno Sho (Spring).

== Background ==
North Flight was foaled on April 12, 1990, in Taihoku Stud located in Hokkaido, Japan. Her dam Shadai Flight delivered her without any human assistance, and by the time Saito discovered her in the morning, North Flight was already standing. According to Saito, she possessed such excellent conformation that “she showed nothing but the best traits of her sire” and “I even thought she might be a colt.” However, as this was the first year of Tony Bin’s offspring, they had gained a reputation in horse-breeding circles for being frail and unreliable; consequently, despite North Flight possessing a physique above average, no buyer came forward. Out of necessity, the ranch ended up retaining ownership of North Flight. The name “North Flight” was derived by combining “North” from Ohkita Ranch with “Flight,” a part of her dam's name.

Although she was a healthy horse growing steadily, her training progress was slow. It wasn't until she turned four that she was transferred to a training facility in Nara Prefecture, and in February of that year, she entered the stable of Keiji Kato at the Ritto Training Center in Shiga Prefecture. While she was undergoing training at Ritto, Tony Bin's offspring—led by Vega and Winning Ticket—were performing exceptionally well in the Classic series against his fellow 4-year-olds. However, at this point, Saito did not have high expectations for North Flight's racing ability and simply believed that “even if she’s no good as a racehorse, she has value as a stud.”

== Racing career ==
=== 1993: four-year-old season ===
North Flight made her debut on May 1 in a race for unraced fillies at Niigata Racecourse with Masato Nishizono in the saddle. Favored as the top choice that day, she secured her maiden victory by a margin of nine lengths. About three months later, in the Adachiyama Tokubetsu, Yutaka Take took the reins, and she again won convincingly by eight lengths. Based on her performance in those two races, some began to call her “the horse that could prevent Vega from achieving the Triple Crown,” and Yutaka Take, one of her jockeys, commented, “To run this well with only one race under her belt and coming off a layoff shows she’s in a league of her own,” adding, “She might become a rival to Vega this fall.”

However, in the Shubun Tokubetsu, she suffered a fever and hives during her preparation, indicating she was not in peak condition. Compounded by the fact that she went into heat on race day, she finished in 5th place, the worst result of her career. Since she needed to accumulate additional prize money to qualify for the Queen Elizabeth II Cup, she competed in the Fuchu Himba Stakes on October 16. Ridden by Koichi Tsunoda and backed as the fourth favorite on race day, she tracked the leaders from a good position before pulling away with ease in the home stretch, securing her first graded stakes victory in only her fourth career start. This made her a leading contender for the Queen Elizabeth II Cup; however, since all three of her wins had come over distances around 1,600 meters and her only defeat had been at 2,000 meters, some observers expressed concerns about her ability to handle the 2,400-meter distance of the Queen Elizabeth II Cup.

In the Queen Elizabeth II Cup on November 14, she was rated as the fifth favorite, partly due to these distance concerns. In the race, she ran in the middle of the pack and briefly took the lead in the final straight, but was immediately overtaken on the inside by Hokuto Vega, the ninth favorite, and finished second, one and a half lengths behind. Jockey Kakuta commented, “When she broke away, I thought we could win, but I hadn’t noticed Hokuto Vega at all.” At the end of the year, ridden by Yutaka Take, she won the Hanshin Fillies’ Special, ending the season with her second graded stakes victory.

=== 1994: five-year-old season ===
In 1994, her first year as a 5-year-old, North Flight began her campaign with the Kyoto Himba Tokubetsu, winning by a margin of six lengths. At that time, both Yutaka Take and Kato expressed the impression that North Flight was a miler, and from then on, she would pursue a miler's career path. In the subsequent Yomiuri Milers Cup, she faced colts for the first time but defeated Marvelous Crown by a neck, winning in record time. Takeshi praised the performance, saying, “It was a stronger performance than the margin of victory suggests. I think it was a very comfortable win.” After the race, the stable explicitly announced that the horse would run in the Yasuda Kinen, the spring championship for milers, but Takeshi asked Kato to postpone his decision on whether he would ride North Flight in the Yasuda Kinen until after the Keio Cup Spring Cup, another preparatory race. In the Keio Cup Spring Cup, Ski Paradise, a French-trained horse ridden by Take, won the race, finishing ahead of the three other foreign horses in the field, who placed second through fourth.

On May 15, she competed in the Grade 1 Yasuda Kinen, which had become an international race the previous year. In addition to Ski Paradise, the foreign contingent included a lineup of proven Group 1-caliber horses such as Sayedati, winner of the 1,000 Guineas Stakes and the Prix Jacques Le Marois; Dolphin Street, winner of the Prix de l’Étoile; and Zaiten, winner of the Middle Park Stakes, creating a field “that was on par with the Japan Cup.” Takahashi rode Ski Paradise, who was the race favorite, while Koichi Tsunoda—who had also ridden North Flight in the Queen Elizabeth II Cup—rode North Flight, the fifth favorite. When the race began, North Flight got off to a slow start and was forced to race from the back of the pack; however, as the front-runners battled it out, the pace remained extremely fast, with the 1,000-meter split clocked at 56.9 seconds—just 0.5 seconds off the Japanese record. North Flight closed in on the leading pack from the rear at the final turn, took the lead around the 200-meter mark of the home stretch, and went on to win her first GI title by a margin of two and a half lengths over the runner-up, Towa Darling. The winning time of 1 minute 33.2 seconds was the second-fastest in the race's history (at the time). This was also the first Grade I victory for trainer Kato. Kato described it as “a race to be proud of,” while jockey Kakuta praised North Flight, saying, “To run this strongly against the world’s top horses—she really is an amazing horse.”

Since the horse had been brought to peak condition “at the very last minute,” North Flight entered a rest period after the spring race and spent the summer at Northern Farm Kuko Ranch in Hokkaido. After returning to the stable in the fall, the plan was to head straight to the Mile Championship in November, but because the horse's condition improved more quickly than expected, she began her campaign with the Swan Stakes, a lead-up race. Also competing in this race was Sakura Bakushin O, the previous year's Sprinters’ Stakes winner who had finished fourth in the Yasuda Kinen; thus, the “Sprint King” and the “Mile Queen” faced off over 1,400 meters—a distance slightly longer or shorter than their respective optimal distances. North Flight, competing at the shortest distance of her career, appeared to struggle slightly to keep up with the pack during the race and was unable to break away smoothly from the field at the final turn. Although she made a strong push down the stretch, she finished second, 1 1/4 lengths behind Sakura Bakushin O. Notably, his finishing time of 1 minute 19.9 seconds was the first time a 1,400-meter race had been run in under 1 minute 20 seconds—a Japanese record at the time—and remained the Hanshin Racecourse record until it was broken by Isla Bonita in 2017.

On November 20, he competed in his target race, the Mile Championship. Prior to the race, it was announced that this would be his final start before retirement. It was a rematch with Sakura Bakushin O, but North Flight was considered the favorite over the mile distance and was backed as the top choice at odds of 1.7 to 1. Sakura Bakushin O followed at 3.3 to 1, while the third favorite, Fujino Macken O, trailed far behind at odds of over 11 to 1. When the race began, Sakura Bakushin O settled into third place, with North Flight right behind him. The pace picked up coming out of the third turn, and Sakura Bakushin O took the lead at the entrance to the home stretch, but North Flight caught him midway through the stretch and won by a length and a half. The winning time of 1 minute 33.0 seconds set a new course record, breaking the previous mark by 0.3 seconds. She became only the second horse—and the first in nine years since Nihon Pillow Winner in 1985—to win both the Yasuda Kinen and the Mile Championship in the same calendar year.

Kato remarked, “I hear people say it’s a shame to retire her, but considering the tough conditions ahead, I think this is the right time.” Saito of Ohkita Farm also stated, “Everyone tells me it’s a shame, but she still has work to do, so I think this is for the best.” On November 30, North Flight was withdrawn from the racing registry and returned to Ohkita Farm to begin her breeding career.

The following January 1995, she was selected as the JRA Award for Best Older Filly or Mare for that year. Additionally, in the JRA's Free Handicap, she was assigned 60 kilograms—the highest rating ever given to a mare in the short-distance category. Although she won the Yasuda Kinen and the Mile Championship, Sakura Bakushin O was selected as the JRA Award for Best Sprinter or Miler. Keijirō Ōkawa pointed out that Yamanin Zephyr, who had been selected as the Best Short-Distance Horse the previous year, had lost to Sakura Bakushin O in that year's Sprinters’ Stakes; based on that logic, he argued, it was strange that North Flight—who had defeated Sakura Bakushin O and won two Grade I races that year—was not selected. “It means that, even though the evaluation criteria are inconsistent, reporters are casting their votes based on their own arbitrary judgments,” he said, voicing his dissatisfaction. He later revealed that at the time, he himself had told the JRA, “Unless you properly explain to reporters whether a horse that wins a 1,600-meter race should be included in the ‘sprinter’ category or not, they'll be confused.” That year, Narita Brian—who became only the fifth horse in Central Racing history to achieve the Triple Crown—was selected as Horse of the Year; however, since only one vote was cast for North Flight, he was not elected by a unanimous vote.

== Retirement ==
Starting with Northern Taste, her first breeding partner, North Flight was bred to numerous top-ranked stallions, but aside from Miscast (sired by Sunday Silence), who won the 2001 Principal Stakes, she did not produce any horses that competed at the open class level. Miscast became a stallion after retirement and sired Beat Black, who won the 2012 Tenno Sho (Spring). Kikoushi, a colt from her first crop, served as a lead horse at Hanshin Racecourse from 2006 to 2011. Additionally, among the descendants of his second foal, Vermeer Blue, is Date no Shogun, winner of the 2023 Haiseiko Kinen and the 2024 Kuroshio Cup; and among the descendants of his fourth foal, Es Flight, is Meisho Zuiun, winner of the 2026 BSN Stakes and a two-time third-place finisher in graded stakes races.

She retired from breeding after failing to conceive in 2011. She subsequently spent the remainder of her life as a retired racehorse at Ohkita Farm in Urakawa Town, Hokkaido, but died on January 22, 2018, due to heart failure.

=== Breeding record ===
c = colt, f = filly

No.	Name	Foaled	Sex	Color	Sire	Races	Wins	Remarks
1st	Kikoushi	1996	c	Bay	Northern Taste	38	4	Retired
2nd	Vermeer Blue	1997	f	Bay	Northern Taste	25	3	Retired
3rd	Miscast	1998	c	Bay	Sunday Silence	24	5	Retired, broodsire
4th	S Flight	1999	f	Dark Bay	Sunday Silence	2	0	Retired, broodmare
5th	(unnamed)	2000	c	Bay	Brian's Time			Did not run
6th	Pabula	2001	f	Bay	Brian's Time	25	3	Retired
7th	Merveilleuse	2003	f	Dark bay	El Condor Pasa	6	1	Retired
	(death after birth)	2004			Taiki Shuttle			
	(infertility)	2005			Special Week			
8th	Hauoli	2006	f	Bay	King Kamehameha	12	3	Retired, broodmare
9th	Quatroze Flight	2007	c	Bay	Symboli Kris S	3	0	Retired
	(infertility)	2008			Dance in the Dark			
10th	Miracle Moon	2009	f	Dark bay	Admire Moon	18	1	Retired
	(death after birth)	2010			King Kamehameha			
	(infertility)	2011			King Kamehameha			
	(infertility)	2012			Conduit			

== In popular culture ==
An anthropomorphized version of North Flight appears as a character in the Japanese multimedia franchise Umamusume: Pretty Derby, voiced by Maria Sashide. She is depicted as a passionate, classy fashionista with a specialization in mile-distance races, which earned her the nickname "Queen of Miles", in contrast to her rival Sakura Bakushin O being the "King of Sprints". Both are noted to have never won against their rival in their respective specialty distances, though the player can change this. The extremely close and borderline-romantic bond between the two, as seen in the spinoff manga Umamusume: Star Blossom and in an in-game limited event, are references to how, historically, the respective owners of both horses briefly discussed the prospects of breeding them together.

== Racing record ==
The table below shows her racing career, which was taken from netkeiba.com.

Date	Age	Race	Distance	Surface	Track	Finish	Field	Jockey	Time	Margin	Winner (Runner-up)
May 1, 1993	4	3YO Unraced	1600m	Turf	Niigata	1st	14	Masato Nishizono	1:36.2	–1.5	(Southern Great)
Jul 25, 1993	4	Adachiyama Tokubetsu	1700m	Turf	Kokura	1st	12	Yutaka Take	1:41.3	–1.3	(Romance Tosho)
Sep 18, 1993	4	Shubun Tokubetsu	2000m	Turf	Hanshin	5th	11	Yutaka Take	2:03.0	1.2	Shimano Yamahime
Oct 17, 1993	4	Fuchu Himba Stakes	1600m	Turf	Tokyo	1st	16	Koichi Tsunoda	1:34.7	–0.1	(Persian Spot)
Nov 19, 1993	4	Queen Elizabeth 2 Commemorative Cup	2400m	Turf	Kyoto	2nd	18	Koichi Tsunoda	2:25.1	0.1	Hokuto Vega
Dec 19, 1993	4	Hanshin Himba Tokubetsu	2000m	Turf	Kyoto	1st	13	Yutaka Take	2:02.8	–0.2	(Best Dancing)
Jan 30, 1994	5	Kyoto Himba Tokubetsu	1600m	Turf	Hanshin	1st	13	Yutaka Take	1:36.8	–1.0	(Favor One)
Mar 6, 1994	5	Yomiuri Milers Cup	1700m	Turf	Chukyo	1st	11	Yutaka Take	1:40.6	0.0	(Marvelous Crown)
May 15, 1994	5	Yasuda Kinen	1600m	Turf	Tokyo	1st	16	Koichi Tsunoda	1:33.2	–0.4	(Towa Darling)
Oct 29, 1994	5	Swan Stakes	1400m	Turf	Hanshin	2nd	16	Koichi Tsunoda	1:20.1	0.2	Sakura Bakushin O
Nov 20, 1994	5	Mile Championship	1600m	Turf	Kyoto	1st	14	Koichi Tsunoda	1:33.0	–0.2	(Sakura Bakushin O)

== Pedigree ==
Pedigree of North Flight, bay mare 1990
Sire Tony Bin 1983	Kampala; 1976	Kalamoun	Zeddaan
Sire Tony Bin 1983	Kampala; 1976	Kalamoun	Khairunissa
Sire Tony Bin 1983	Kampala; 1976	State Pension	Only For Life
Sire Tony Bin 1983	Kampala; 1976	State Pension	Lorelei
Sire Tony Bin 1983	Severn Bridge; 1965	Hornbeam	Hyperion
Sire Tony Bin 1983	Severn Bridge; 1965	Hornbeam	Thicket
Sire Tony Bin 1983	Severn Bridge; 1965	Priddy Fair	Preciptic
Sire Tony Bin 1983	Severn Bridge; 1965	Priddy Fair	Campanette
Dam Shadai Flight 1973	Hitting Away; 1958	Ambiorix	Tourbillon
Dam Shadai Flight 1973	Hitting Away; 1958	Ambiorix	Labendula
Dam Shadai Flight 1973	Hitting Away; 1958	Striking	War Admiral
Dam Shadai Flight 1973	Hitting Away; 1958	Striking	Baby League
Dam Shadai Flight 1973	Forward Flight; 1967	Porterhouse	Endeavour
Dam Shadai Flight 1973	Forward Flight; 1967	Porterhouse	Red Stamp
Dam Shadai Flight 1973	Forward Flight; 1967	Bashful Girl	Khaled
Dam Shadai Flight 1973	Forward Flight; 1967	Bashful Girl	But Beautiful
