= Tony Bin =

Thoroughbred racehorse

- Tony Bin at the 1988 Prix de l'Arc de Triomphe.
- Breed: Thoroughbred
- Sire: Kampala (GB)
- Grandsire: Kalamoun
- Dam: Severn Bridge (GB)
- Damsire: Hornbeam
- Sex: Stallion
- Foaled: 7 April 1983
- Died: 10 March 2000 (aged 16)
- Country: Ireland
- Colour: Bay
- Breeder: Pat O'Callaghan
- Owner: Luciano Gaucci
- Trainer: Luigi Camici
- Record: 27: 15-5-4
- Earnings: £1.189.885

Major wins
- Premio Presidente della Repubblica (1987, 1988); Gran Premio di Milano (1987, 1988); Gran Premio del Jockey Club (1987); Premio Federico Tesio (1988); Prix de l'Arc de Triomphe (1988)

Awards
- Timeform rating 134 (1988); Leading older male in Europe (1988); Leading sire in Japan (1994)
- Last updated on 17 September 2011

Tony Bin (7 April 1983 – 10 March 2000) was an Irish-bred Thoroughbred racehorse who competed in Europe for his Italian owner from a base in Milan and became a leading sire in Japan.

== Background ==
Bred by Pat O'Callaghan, Tony Bin was foaled on 7 April 1983. He was a son of Rathbarry Stud's Kampala and out of the mare Severn Bridge by Hornbeam. The colt was a descendant of the great Nearco through both his sire and his dam. O'Callaghan sold him for 3,000 guineas to the Allevamento White Star breeding and racing operation of Italian businessman Luciano Gaucci. He was named for a poor Italian painter living in Paris, who he first met at the Louvre while trying to replicate a painting of the Mona Lisa. After chatting, the artist invited Luciano to the attic he lived in, where Gaucci subsequently purchased one of his paintings for ₤1 million.

== Racing career ==
Tony Bin was trained by Luigi Camici. At age two, his best result in a major race was a third in the GI Gran Criterium at Milan's San Siro Racecourse. As a three-year-old in 1986, he finished second in the GI Gran Premio del Jockey Club.

In 1987 at age four, Tony Bin won some of Italy's most prestigious Group One events, including the Gran Premio del Jockey Club, Premio Presidente della Repubblica and Gran Premio di Milano, repeating as winner of the latter two in 1988. Sent to race in France and England, he ran second in the 1988 Grand Prix de Saint-Cloud and third to Mtoto in the 1988 King George VI and Queen Elizabeth Stakes. In October, he beat Mtoto in France's most prestigious race, the Prix de l'Arc de Triomphe.

== Assessment ==
At the end of the 1988 season, Tony Bin was officially rated the equal of Mtoto as the best older male horse in Europe, one pound behind the filly Miesque. Timeform also could not divide Tony Bin and Mtoto, awarding both horses a rating of 134 and making them the best older horses of either sex, one pound ahead of Miesque and the British filly Indian Skimmer.

== Stud record ==
Tony Bin was sold for US$4 million to Zenya Yoshida Japan. He stood at stud at their Shadai Stallion Station in Shiraoi, Hokkaido, where he met with considerable success. The leading sire in Japan in 1994, Tony Bin produced progeny that includes:

- Air Groove (1993) – Horse of the Year and 1997 Champion Older Mare in Japan. In July 2004, her foal (later named The Sunday Fusaichi) by Dance in the Dark sold for ¥490,000,000 (US$4.54 million), making it the world's highest-priced foal and the most expensive horse ever sold at auction in Japan. Air Groove also foaled Admire Groove and Rulership (winner of the 2012 Q.E.II Cup), the former of which in turn foaled Duramente.
- Offside Trap (1991) – Winner of the 1998 Autumn Tenno Sho.
- Jungle Pocket (1998) – winner of the Tokyo Yushun and Japan Cup, voted the 2001 Japanese Horse of the Year and rated that year by Timeform as the third best three-year-old colt in the world. Sire of Tosen Jordan.
- Lady Pastel (1998) – winner of the 2001 Yushun Himba.
- Narita Century (1999) – Japanese stakes winner of US$2,466,527.
- North Flight (1990) – winner of Yasuda Kinen and Mile Championship.
- Sakura Chitose O (1990) – winner of 1995 Tenno Sho (Autumn)
- Telegnosis (1999) – winner of GI NHK Mile Cup with career earnings of more than US$3 million.
- Vega (1990) – winner of the 1993 Oka Sho (Japanese 1000 Guineas) and Yushun Himba (Japanese Oaks); dam of 1999 Tokyo Yushun winner Admire Vega.
- Winning Ticket (1990) – winner of the 1993 Tokyo Yushun (Japanese Derby).

Tony Bin sired other Grade I millionaire winners and was also the damsire of the Japanese colt Heart's Cry, winner of the 2006 Dubai Sheema Classic, who handed Deep Impact his first-ever loss in winning the 2005 Arima Kinen.

Tony Bin died unexpectedly of heart failure on 10 March 2000 at age 16.

== Pedigree ==
Pedigree of Tony Bin (IRE), bay stallion 1983
| Sire Kampala (GB) 1976 | Kalamoun; 1970 | Zeddaan | Grey Sovereign |
| Sire Kampala (GB) 1976 | Kalamoun; 1970 | Zeddaan | Vareta |
| Sire Kampala (GB) 1976 | Kalamoun; 1970 | Khairunissa | Prince Bio |
| Sire Kampala (GB) 1976 | Kalamoun; 1970 | Khairunissa | Palariva |
| Sire Kampala (GB) 1976 | State Pension; 1967 | Only for Life | Chanteur |
| Sire Kampala (GB) 1976 | State Pension; 1967 | Only for Life | Life Sentence |
| Sire Kampala (GB) 1976 | State Pension; 1967 | Lorelei | Prince Chevalier |
| Sire Kampala (GB) 1976 | State Pension; 1967 | Lorelei | Rock Goddess |
| Dam Severn Bridge (GB) 1965 | Hornbeam; 1953 | Hyperion | Gainsborough |
| Dam Severn Bridge (GB) 1965 | Hornbeam; 1953 | Hyperion | Selene |
| Dam Severn Bridge (GB) 1965 | Hornbeam; 1953 | Thicket | Nasrullah |
| Dam Severn Bridge (GB) 1965 | Hornbeam; 1953 | Thicket | Thorn Wood |
| Dam Severn Bridge (GB) 1965 | Priddy Fair (IRE); 1956 | Preciptic | Precipitation |
| Dam Severn Bridge (GB) 1965 | Priddy Fair (IRE); 1956 | Preciptic | Artistic |
| Dam Severn Bridge (GB) 1965 | Priddy Fair (IRE); 1956 | Campanette | Fair Trial |
| Dam Severn Bridge (GB) 1965 | Priddy Fair (IRE); 1956 | Campanette | Calluna (Family: 19-b) |

== In popular culture ==
In the anime and manga series, Umamusume: Cinderella Gray, a character based on Tony Bin is named Toni Bianca, who is featured as part of the Japan Cup arc. She is voiced by Yūko Kaida.
