= Hokuto Vega =

Japanese thoroughbred racehorse

Hokuto Vega ホクトベガ
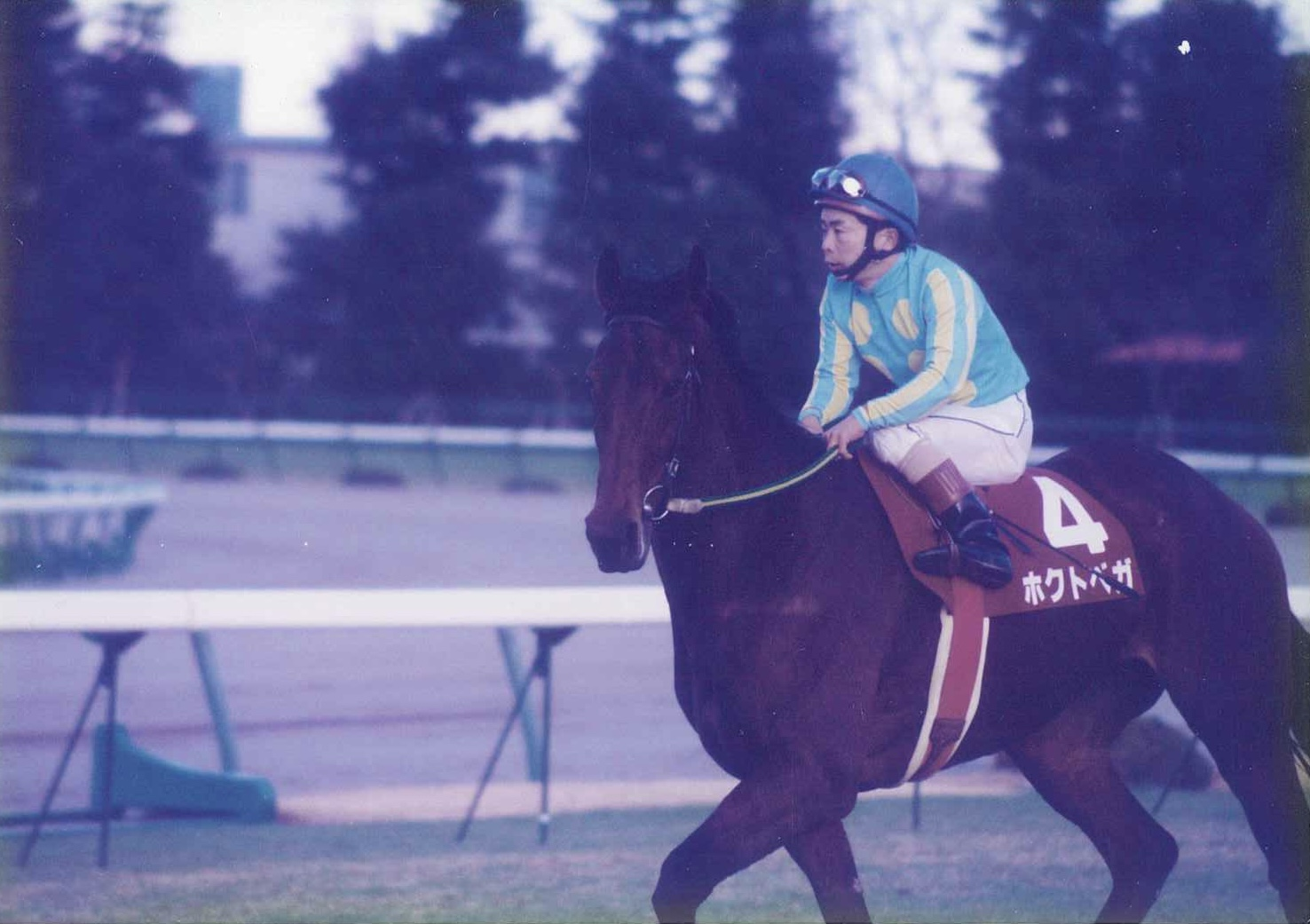
- Hokuto Vega in December 1995
- Breed: Thoroughbred
- Sire: Nagurski
- Grandsire: Nijinsky
- Dam: Takeno Falcon
- Damsire: Philip of Spain
- Sex: Mare
- Foaled: March 26, 1990
- Died: April 3, 1997 (aged 7)
- Country: Japan
- Colour: Bay
- Breeder: Sakai Farm
- Owner: Kanamorimori Corporation
- Racing colours
- Trainer: Takao Nakano
- Jockey: Kazuhiro Kato; Norihiro Yokoyama
- Record: 42: 16-5-4
- Earnings: 888,126,000 ¥ $8,300,301

Major wins
- Flower Cup (1993); Sapporo Kinen (1994); Empress Hai (1995, 1996); Kawasaki Kinen (1996, 1997); February Stakes (1996); Diolite Kinen (1996); Gunma Kinen (1996); Teio Sho (1996); Mile Championship Nambu Hai (1996); Urawa Kinen (1996); Japanese Classic Tiara Race wins: Queen Elizabeth II Commemorative Cup (1993)

Awards
- JRA Award for Best Dirt Horse (1996)

Hokuto Vega (Japanese: ホクトベガ, Hepburn: Hokuto Bega; March 26, 1990 – April 3, 1997) was a Japanese Thoroughbred racehorse and the winner of the 1993 Queen Elizabeth II Cup. She was badly injured in a fall during the 1997 Dubai World Cup at what was her retirement race and had to be euthanized. She was famous by having an early great career on turf before successfully switching to dirt on the later half.

== Career ==
Hokuto Vega's first race was on January 5, 1993, at Nakayama, where she came in first. She picked up her next win at the 1993 Cattleya Sho on February 20. She competed in her first graded race on March 20, 1993, when she won the 1993 Flower Cup. This win helped her gain entry into the 1993 Oka Sho, where she came in 5th place. On May 23, 1993, she competed in the Grade-1 Yushun Himba, where she came in 6th. She came in 2nd place at the October 3, 1993, Grade-3 Queen Stakes. On November 14, 1993, she scored a major upset by winning the 1993 Grade-1 Queen Elizabeth II Cup, the biggest win of her career.

In 1994, she faced a winless season except for victories at the June 12th Sapporo Nikkei Open and the Grade-3 Sapporo Kinen. It wasn't until June 13th, 1995, that she secured her sole victory of the year, winning the 1995 Empress Hai.

She had her most successful racing season in 1996. She won 8 of the 10 races she competed in during the 1996 season. Her wins in 1996 included victories at the Kawasaki Kinen, the February Stakes, the Diolite Kinen, the Gunma Kinen, the Grade-1 Teio Sho, the Grade-1 Mile Championship Nambu Hai and the Urawa Kinen. In November, she attempted to repeat her win in the Queen Elizabeth II Cup, with the race newly being open to fillies and mares of all ages 3 and over, but came up short behind three younger mares, with the first place being Dance Partner. At the end of the year, she was awarded the JRA Award for Best Dirt Horse.

Hokuto Vega's 8 year old season in 1997 started off strong. She repeated her win in the Kawasaki Kinen on February 5, becoming the only filly or mare to win the race twice. A couple months later, Hokuto Vega was invited to the second running of the Dubai World Cup, which was scheduled to be her retirement race. She broke well from the gates and settled in the back of the pack, but rounding the corner into the final straight, she suddenly fell, colliding with Bijou d'Inde. She had a poor prognosis, and was euthanized shortly after as a result. Due to quarantine regulations, her body was never repatriated to Japan. As she died before she could become a broodmare, she produced no foals. Shortly after her death, Kawasaki Racecourse established the Sparking Lady Cup, also called the Hokuto Vega Memorial in her honor, which is run over a 1600 meter dirt track.

== Racing form ==
Hokuto Vega raced in 42 races and achieved 16 wins with nine more placed finish. The data available is based on JBIS and netkeiba.com.

Date	Track	Race	Grade	Distance (Condition)	Entry	HN	Odds (Favored)	Finish	Time	Margins	Jockey	Winner (Runner-up)
1993 – three-year-old season
Jan 5	Nakayama	3YO debut		1400m（Fast）	16	2	3.7（2）	1st	1:12.5	–1.5	Kazuhiro Kato	(Izumi Blue)
Jan 16	Nakayama	Shuchiku Sho	ALW (1W)	1800m（Muddy）	9	9	1.5（1）	2nd	1:52.4	0.1	Kazuhiro Kato	Saikyo Hozan
Feb 20	Tokyo	Cattleya Sho	ALW (1W)	1600m（Fast）	16	12	1.9（1）	1st	1:37.8	–0.5	Kazuhiro Kato	(Sanei Record)
Mar 20	Nakayama	Flower Cup	3	1800m（Firm）	14	3	2.9（2）	1st	1:49.7	–0.1	Kazuhiro Kato	(Tai Juliet)
Apr 11	Hanshin	Oka Sho	1	1600m（Firm）	18	16	16.2（6）	5th	1:37.7	0.5	Kazuhiro Kato	Vega
May 23	Tokyo	Yushun Himba	1	2400m（Firm）	18	14	10.2（5）	6th	2:28.2	0.9	Kazuhiro Kato	Vega
Oct 3	Nakayama	Queen Stakes	3	2000m（Firm）	14	10	3.3（2）	2nd	2:02.6	0.3	Kazuhiro Kato	Yukino Bijin
Oct 24	Kyoto	Rose Stakes	2	2000m（Firm）	14	3	5.5（3）	3rd	2:00.7	0.5	Kazuhiro Kato	Star Ballerina
Nov 14	Kyoto	QE II Cup	1	2400m（Firm）	18	1	30.4（9）	1st	2:24.9	–0.2	Kazuhiro Kato	(North Flight)
Dec 18	Nakayama	Turquoise Stakes	OP	1800m（Firm）	9	2	3.7（2）	3rd	1:49.8	0.4	Kazuhiro Kato	Yukino Bijin
1994 – four-year-old season
Jan 15	Hanshin	Heian Stakes	3	1800m（Fast）	16	12	5.3（2）	10th	1:54.3	1.5	Kazuhiro Kato	Toyo Lyphard
Feb 27	Nakayama	Nakayama Himba Stakes	3	1800m（Firm）	11	9	3.6（2）	4th	1:48.3	0.7	Kazuhiro Kato	Hokkai Seres
Apr 23	Tokyo	Keio Hai Spring Cup	2	1400m（Firm）	16	9	12.1（5）	5th	1:21.9	0.5	Kazuhiro Kato	Ski Paradise
Jun 12	Sapporo	Sapporo Nikkei Open	OP	1800m（Firm）	12	5	2.3（1）	1st	R1:47.2	–0.3	Kazuhiro Kato	(Mogami Saruno)
Jul 3	Sapporo	Sapporo Kinen	3	2000m（Firm）	13	10	2.0（1）	1st	2:00.9	–0.1	Kazuhiro Kato	(A. P. Grand Prix)
Aug 21	Sapporo	Hakodate Kinen	3	2000m（Firm）	14	3	2.9（1）	3rd	2:02.1	0.5	Kazuhiro Kato	Wako Chikako
Oct 9	Tokyo	Mainichi Okan	2	1800m（Firm）	11	8	26.5（11）	9th	1:45.4	0.8	Kazuhiro Kato	Nehai Caesar
Nov 13	Tokyo	Fuji Stakes	OP	1800m（Firm）	11	3	6.6（2）	6th	1:47.6	0.7	Kazuhiro Kato	Sakura Chitose O
Dec 18	Hanshin	Hanshin Himba Stakes	2	2000m（Firm）	13	6	16.3（6）	5th	2:01.2	0.6	Kazuhiro Kato	Memory Jasper
1995 – five-year-old season
Jan 22	Nakayama	American Jockey Club Cup	2	2200m（Firm）	10	1	57.1（6）	2nd	2:14.5	0.1	Kazuhiro Kato	Sakura Chitose O
Feb 26	Nakayama	Nakayama Himba Stakes	3	1800m（Good）	10	6	3.2（1）	2nd	1:49.5	0.1	Kazuhiro Kato	Alpha Cute
Mar 12	Nakayama	Nakayama Kinen	2	1800m（Good）	12	8	10.3（2）	8th	1:50.8	0.5	Kazuhiro Kato	Fujiyama Kenzan
Apr 22	Tokyo	Keio Hai Spring Cup	2	1400m（Firm）	18	16	25.6（11）	3rd	1:21.5	0.2	Norihiro Yokoyama	Dumaani
May 14	Tokyo	Yasuda Kinen	1	1600m（Firm）	18	10	10.1（3）	5th	1:33.5	0.3	Norihiro Yokoyama	Heart Lake
Jun 13	Kawasaki	Empress Hai	Grade-1	2000m（Muddy）	7	7	0.0（1）	1st	2:06.5	–3.6	Norihiro Yokoyama	(Aqua Raiden)
Aug 20	Sapporo	Hakodate Kinen	3	2000m（Soft）	16	3	8.5（5）	11th	2:03.5	1.1	Hitoshi Matoba	Inter My Way
Oct 8	Tokyo	Mainichi Okan	2	1800m（Soft）	14	5	21.6（8）	7th	1:49.2	0.8	Eizaburo Otsuka	Sugano Oji
Oct 29	Tokyo	Tenno Sho (Autumn)	1	2000m（Firm）	17	18	77.0（15）	16th	2:00.2	1.4	Norihiro Yokoyama	Sakura Chitose O
Nov 19	Niigata	Fukushima Kinen	3	2000m（Firm）	16	12	13.7（8）	2nd	2:01.9	0.0	Eiji Nakadate	Meiner Bridge
Dec 17	Hanshin	Hanshin Himba Stakes	2	2000m（Firm）	12	4	12.8（5）	5th	2:00.8	0.5	Eiji Nakadate	Samani Beppin
1996 – six-year-old season
Jan 24	Kawasaki	Kawasaki Kinen	Grade-1	2000m（Fast）	12	9	0.0（2）	1st	2:07.5	–1.0	Norihiro Yokoyama	(Life Asahi)
Feb 17	Tokyo	February Stakes	2	1600m（Fast）	15	5	4.6（3）	1st	1:36.5	–0.6	Norihiro Yokoyama	(I Owe You)
Mar 20	Funabashi	Diolite Kinen	Grade-1	2400m（Fast）	8	8	0.0（1）	1st	2:31.3	–0.5	Norihiro Yokoyama	(Spectacle)
May 5	Takasaki	Gunma Kinen	Grade-1	1500m（Muddy）	12	2	0.0（1）	1st	R1:33.6	–0.5	Norihiro Yokoyama	(Hikari Rufas)
Jun 19	Ohi	Teio Sho	Grade-1	2000m（Fast）	15	10	0.0（1）	1st	2:04.2	–0.4	Norihiro Yokoyama	(I Owe You)
Jul 15	Kawasaki	Empress Hai	Grade-1	2000m（Fast）	6	2	0.0（1）	1st	2:06.7	–1.5	Norihiro Yokoyama	(Speed Iris)
Oct 10	Morioka	Mile Championship Nambu Hai	Grade-1	1600m（Fast）	12	2	0.0（1）	1st	1:38.3	–1.3	Hitoshi Matoba	(Heisei Silver)
Nov 10	Kyoto	QE II Cup	1	2200m（Firm）	16	2	8.5（4）	4th	2:14.4	0.1	Hitoshi Matoba	Dance Partner
Dec 4	Urawa	Urawa Kinen	Grade-1	2000m（Fast）	9	8	0.0（1）	1st	2:05.5	–0.2	Norihiro Yokoyama	(Kyoto City)
Dec 22	Nakayama	Arima Kinen	1	2500m（Firm）	14	9	31.3（9）	9th	2:36.0	2.2	Shinji Fujita	Sakura Laurel
1997 – seven-year-old season
Jan 24	Kawasaki	Kawasaki Kinen	Grade-1	2000m（Good）	11	7	0.0（1）	1st	2:06.7	–0.6	Norihiro Yokoyama	(Kyoto City)
Apr 3	Nad Al Sheba	Dubai World Cup	L	2000m（Fast）	12	8	–	DNF	–	–	Norihiro Yokoyama	Singspiel

Legend:
Turf Dirt

- R means it was a record time finish
- All "Grade-1" ranked race was labeled as listed in international level

== Pedigree ==
Pedigree of Hokuto Vega (JPN), 1990
Sire Nagurski (CAN) 1981	Nijinsky (CAN); 1967	Northern Dancer	Nearctic
Sire Nagurski (CAN) 1981	Nijinsky (CAN); 1967	Northern Dancer	Natalma
Sire Nagurski (CAN) 1981	Nijinsky (CAN); 1967	Flaming Page	Bull Page
Sire Nagurski (CAN) 1981	Nijinsky (CAN); 1967	Flaming Page	Flaring Top
Sire Nagurski (CAN) 1981	Deceit (USA); 1968	Prince John	Princequillo
Sire Nagurski (CAN) 1981	Deceit (USA); 1968	Prince John	Not Afraid
Sire Nagurski (CAN) 1981	Deceit (USA); 1968	Double Agent	Double Jay
Sire Nagurski (CAN) 1981	Deceit (USA); 1968	Double Agent	Conniver
Dam Takeno Falcon (JPN) 1982	Philip of Spain (GB); 1969	Tudor Melody	Tudor Minstrel
Dam Takeno Falcon (JPN) 1982	Philip of Spain (GB); 1969	Tudor Melody	Matelda
Dam Takeno Falcon (JPN) 1982	Philip of Spain (GB); 1969	Lerida	Matador
Dam Takeno Falcon (JPN) 1982	Philip of Spain (GB); 1969	Lerida	Zepherin
Dam Takeno Falcon (JPN) 1982	Cool Fair (JPN); 1978	Yellow God	Red God
Dam Takeno Falcon (JPN) 1982	Cool Fair (JPN); 1978	Yellow God	Sally Deans
Dam Takeno Falcon (JPN) 1982	Cool Fair (JPN); 1978	Sharkskin	Silver Shark
Dam Takeno Falcon (JPN) 1982	Cool Fair (JPN); 1978	Sharkskin	Atrevida
