= Sakura Chitose O =

Japanese Thoroughbred racehorse (1990–2014)

Sakura Chitose O サクラチトセオー
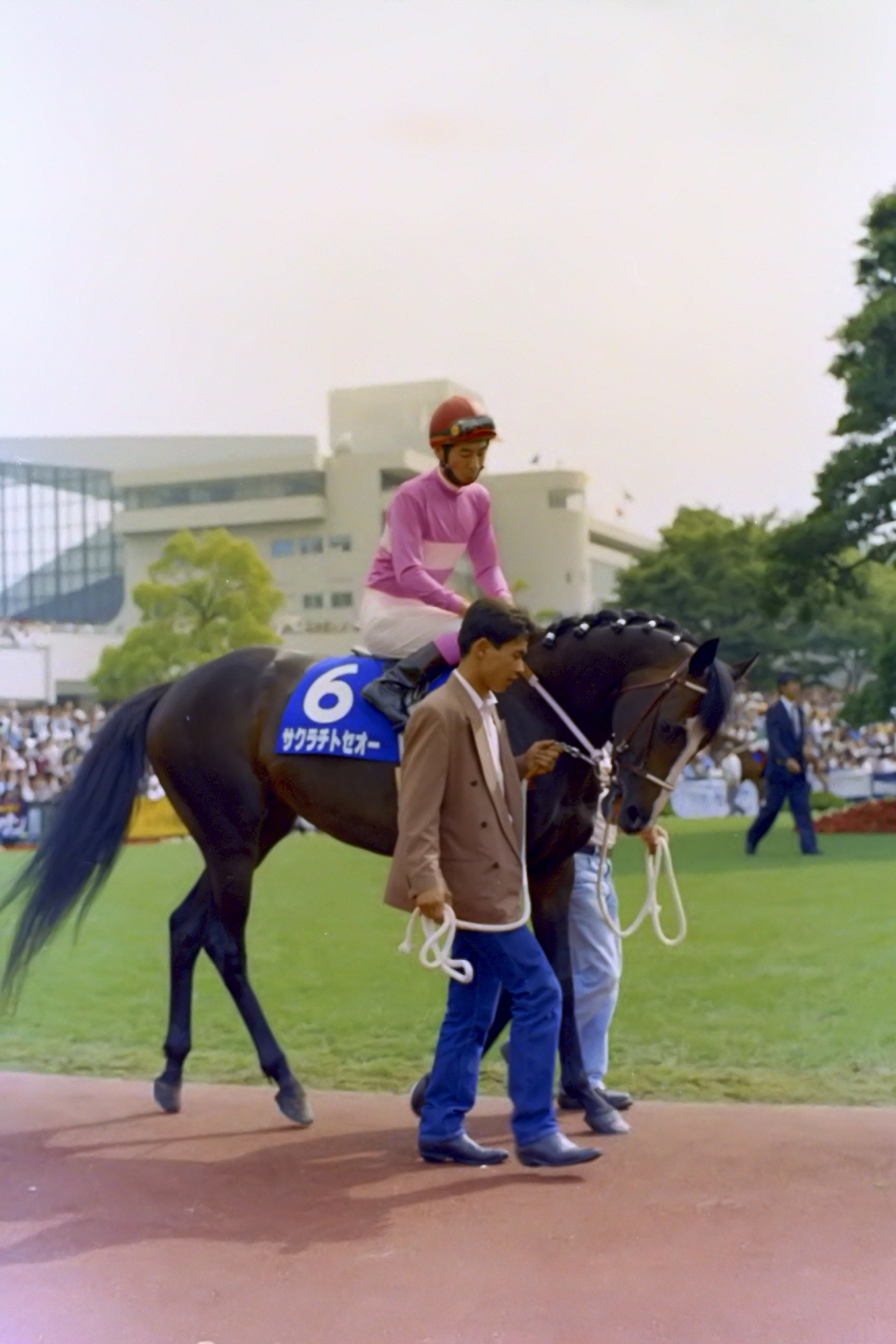
- Sakura Chitose O at the 1995 Takarazuka Kinen.
- Breed: Thoroughbred
- Sire: Tony Bin
- Grandsire: Kampala
- Dam: Sakura Clear
- Damsire: Northern Taste
- Sex: Stallion
- Foaled: 11 May 1990
- Died: 30 January 2014 (aged 23)
- Country: Japan
- Colour: Bay
- Breeder: Tanioka Bokujo
- Owner: Sakura Commerce Co.
- Racing colours
- Trainer: Katsutaro Sakai
- Jockey: Futoshi Kojima; Hitoshi Matoba
- Record: 21: 9-3-3
- Earnings: ¥520,979,000

Major wins
- Nakayama Kinen (1994); Keio Hai Autumn Handicap (1994); American JCC (1995); Tenno Sho (Autumn) (1995)

Awards
- JRA Award for Best Older Male Horse (1995)

Sakura Chitose O (Japanese: サクラチトセオー, Hepburn: Sakura Chitose Ō; 11 May 1990 – 30 January 2014) was a Japanese Thoroughbred racehorse and sire. He competed from 1992 to 1995, recording nine wins in twenty-one starts, including the Tenno Sho (Autumn) in 1995. He received the JRA Award for Best Older Colt or Horse for his performances that year.

== Background ==
Sakura Chitose O was a bay horse bred in Shizunai, Hokkaido, by Tanioka Bokujo. He was sired by Tony Bin, an Irish-bred stallion who won the 1988 Prix de l'Arc de Triomphe before standing in Japan. His dam, Sakura Clear, was a daughter of the influential sire Northern Taste.

He was owned by Sakura Commerce Co. and trained by Katsutaro Sakai at the JRA's Miho Training Center. Throughout his racing career, he was primarily ridden by Futoshi Kojima.

== Racing career ==
=== 1992–1993: Early career ===
Sakura Chitose O debuted on October 11, 1992, at Tokyo Racecourse, winning his maiden race on the turf. He won a subsequent allowance race at Nakayama Racecourse in December.

In the spring of 1993, he contested the NHK Hai (GII), finishing third behind My Shinzan. He subsequently entered the Tokyo Yushun (Japanese Derby, GI) in May, where he finished eleventh behind Winning Ticket.

=== 1994: Four-year-old season ===
Returning in 1994, Sakura Chitose O won the Nakayama Kinen (GII) in March, securing his first graded stakes victory. In September, he contested the Keio Hai Autumn Handicap (GIII). Ridden by Hitoshi Matoba, he won the race and set a new Japanese record for 1600 meters on turf with a time of 1:32.1.

He finished sixth in his first attempt at the Tenno Sho (Autumn) in October, and sixth in the Arima Kinen (GI) in December.

=== 1995: Five-year-old season ===
Sakura Chitose O began his 1995 campaign by winning the American JCC (GII) in January. In May, he contested the Yasuda Kinen (GI). Starting as the favorite, he finished second, losing by a nose to the UAE-trained horse Heart Lake.

In June, he ran in the Takarazuka Kinen (GI). During the race, he was positioned near Rice Shower when the latter suffered a catastrophic injury and fell. Sakura Chitose O avoided physical contact but was visibly affected by the incident, losing his momentum and finishing seventh behind Dantsu Seattle.

On October 29, 1995, Sakura Chitose O entered the Tenno Sho (Autumn) (GI) at Tokyo Racecourse. Ridden by Kojima, he was positioned near the rear of the field for the majority of the race. In the final straight, he accelerated on the outside, overtaking the leader Genuine in the final strides to win by a nose. This victory marked his first GI win and made him and his half-sister Sakura Candle (who won the Queen Elizabeth II Cup that same year) the seventh pair of siblings to win GI races in Japan since the grading system was introduced in 1984.

He made his final start in the Arima Kinen (GI) on December 24, 1995, finishing third behind Mayano Top Gun. He was officially retired following this race.

== Statistics ==
The following table details all 21 starts of Sakura Chitose O's racing career based on official netkeiba and JBIS records.

Date	Distance (Condition)	Race	Class	Course	Odds (Favourite)	Field	Finish	Time	Winning (Losing) Margin	Winner (2nd Place)	Jockey	Ref
1992 – two-year-old season
Oct 11	Turf 1600 m (Firm)	3-Y-O Newcomer	Maiden	Tokyo	3.4 (1st)	15	1st	1:36.3	–0.2	(Hashino Hayato)	Futoshi Kojima	
Dec 19	Turf 1600 m (Firm)	Hiiragi Sho	Allowance	Nakayama	5.0 (2nd)	15	1st	1:35.0	–0.7	(Hashino Hayato)	Futoshi Kojima	
1993 – three-year-old season
May 1	Turf 2400 m (Firm)	Aoba Sho	Open	Tokyo	–	16	Scratched	–	–	Stage Champ	Futoshi Kojima	
May 9	Turf 2000 m (Firm)	NHK Hai	GII	Tokyo	8.8 (3rd)	13	3rd	2:01.5	0.8	My Shinzan	Futoshi Kojima	
May 30	Turf 2400 m (Firm)	Tokyo Yushun	GI	Tokyo	21.1 (6th)	18	11th	2:27.9	2.4	Winning Ticket	Futoshi Kojima	
1994 – four-year-old season
Feb 5	Dirt 1400 m (Fast)	Setsubun Sho	Allowance	Tokyo	1.5 (1st)	16	3rd	1:26.3	0.1	Royal Harbor	Futoshi Kojima	
Feb 20	Turf 1600 m (Firm)	TV Saitama Hai	Allowance	Tokyo	4.2 (2nd)	15	1st	1:34.6	–0.4	(Kioi Smart)	Futoshi Kojima	
Mar 13	Turf 1800 m (Firm)	Nakayama Kinen	GII	Nakayama	6.7 (3rd)	14	1st	1:48.9	–0.2	(Fujiyama Kenzan)	Futoshi Kojima	
Apr 10	Turf 2000 m (Firm)	April Stakes	Open	Nakayama	1.3 (1st)	10	2nd	2:00.1	0.0	Under King	Futoshi Kojima	
May 1	Turf 2300 m (Firm)	Metropolitan Stakes	Open	Tokyo	1.4 (1st)	10	1st	2:20.9	–0.3	(Mermaid Tavern)	Futoshi Kojima	
Jun 12	Turf 2200 m (Firm)	Takarazuka Kinen	GI	Hanshin	21.6 (4th)	14	6th	2:12.6	1.4	Biwa Hayahide	Futoshi Kojima	
Sep 11	Turf 1600 m (Firm)	Keio Hai Autumn Handicap	GIII	Nakayama	3.8 (2nd)	14	1st	R1:32.1	–0.1	(Air Real)	Hitoshi Matoba	
Oct 30	Turf 2000 m (Firm)	Tenno Sho (Autumn)	GI	Tokyo	11.9 (4th)	13	6th	1:59.1	0.5	Nehai Caesar	Futoshi Kojima	
Nov 13	Turf 1800 m (Firm)	Fuji Stakes	Open	Tokyo	1.3 (1st)	11	1st	1:46.9	–0.6	(Stabilizer)	Futoshi Kojima	
Dec 25	Turf 2500 m (Firm)	Arima Kinen	GI	Nakayama	17.9 (5th)	14	6th	2:33.3	1.1	Narita Brian	Futoshi Kojima	
1995 – five-year-old season
Jan 22	Turf 2200 m (Firm)	American JCC	GII	Nakayama	3.9 (2nd)	10	1st	2:14.4	–0.1	(Hokuto Vega)	Futoshi Kojima	
Mar 12	Turf 1800 m (Good)	Nakayama Kinen	GII	Nakayama	1.4 (1st)	12	2nd	1:50.4	0.1	Fujiyama Kenzan	Futoshi Kojima	
May 14	Turf 1600 m (Firm)	Yasuda Kinen	GI	Tokyo	3.3 (1st)	18	2nd	1:33.2	0.0	Heart Lake	Futoshi Kojima	
Jun 4	Turf 2200 m (Good)	Takarazuka Kinen	GI	Kyoto	4.4 (1st)	17	7th	2:10.9	0.7	Dantsu Seattle	Futoshi Kojima	
Oct 8	Turf 1800 m (Soft)	Mainichi Okan	GII	Tokyo	4.1 (2nd)	14	4th	1:49.0	0.6	Sugano Oji	Futoshi Kojima	
Oct 29	Turf 2000 m (Firm)	Tenno Sho (Autumn)	GI	Tokyo	5.3 (2nd)	17	1st	1:58.8	–0.0	(Genuine)	Futoshi Kojima	
Dec 24	Turf 2500 m (Firm)	Arima Kinen	GI	Nakayama	7.0 (4th)	12	3rd	2:34.0	0.4	Mayano Top Gun	Futoshi Kojima	

== Stud career ==
Following his retirement, Sakura Chitose O stood at the Shizunai Stallion Station in Hokkaido. He later moved to Rex Stud in Shinhidaka. He sired 5 graded stakes winners during his stud career. He was retired from stud duties in 2011 and spent his remaining years as a pensioner at Shinwa Bokujo. He died of old age on January 30, 2014, at the age of 23.

== In popular culture ==
Sakura Chitose O is depicted as an anthropomorphic character in the multimedia franchise Umamusume: Pretty Derby, developed by Cygames, voiced by Riko Akechi.

== Notable progeny ==
- 1997 crop
  - Leger Regulus – Radio Nikkei Sho Nisai Stakes (GIII)
- 1999 crop
  - Namura Thanks – Diamond Stakes (GIII)
- 2001 crop
  - Namura Rouge – Hanshin Spring Jump (J-GII)

== Pedigree ==
Pedigree of Sakura Chitose O (JPN)
Sire Tony Bin (IRE) 1983	Kampala (GB); 1976	Kalamoun	Zeddaan
Sire Tony Bin (IRE) 1983	Kampala (GB); 1976	Kalamoun	Khairunissa
Sire Tony Bin (IRE) 1983	Kampala (GB); 1976	State Pension	Only For Life
Sire Tony Bin (IRE) 1983	Kampala (GB); 1976	State Pension	Lorelei
Sire Tony Bin (IRE) 1983	Severn Bridge (GB); 1965	Hornbeam	Hyperion
Sire Tony Bin (IRE) 1983	Severn Bridge (GB); 1965	Hornbeam	Thicket
Sire Tony Bin (IRE) 1983	Severn Bridge (GB); 1965	Priddy Fair	Preciptic
Sire Tony Bin (IRE) 1983	Severn Bridge (GB); 1965	Priddy Fair	Campanette
Dam Sakura Clear (JPN) 1982	Northern Taste (CAN); 1971	Northern Dancer	Nearctic
Dam Sakura Clear (JPN) 1982	Northern Taste (CAN); 1971	Northern Dancer	Natalma
Dam Sakura Clear (JPN) 1982	Northern Taste (CAN); 1971	Lady Victoria	Victoria Park
Dam Sakura Clear (JPN) 1982	Northern Taste (CAN); 1971	Lady Victoria	Lady Angela
Dam Sakura Clear (JPN) 1982	Clare Bridge (USA); 1967	Quadrangle	Cohoes
Dam Sakura Clear (JPN) 1982	Clare Bridge (USA); 1967	Quadrangle	Tap Day
Dam Sakura Clear (JPN) 1982	Clare Bridge (USA); 1967	Abeyance Lass	Ambiorix
Dam Sakura Clear (JPN) 1982	Clare Bridge (USA); 1967	Abeyance Lass	Vulcania

== See also ==
- Thoroughbred racing in Japan
- Tenno Sho
