= Yukino Bijin =

Japanese Thoroughbred racehorse (1990-2016)

Yukino Bijin ユキノビジン
- Yukino Bijin racing at the 1993 Queen Elizabeth II Cup.
- Breed: Thoroughbred
- Sire: Sakura Yutaka O (JPN)
- Grandsire: Tesco Boy (GB)
- Dam: Fatima (JPN)
- Damsire: Royal Ski (USA)
- Sex: Mare
- Foaled: March 10, 1990
- Died: July 22, 2016 (aged 26)
- Country: Japan
- Color: Chestnut
- Breeder: Murata Farm
- Owner: Yukikatsu Arai
- Racing colors
- Trainer: Toshio Kubota
- Jockey: Masahiko Onodera; Isao Sugawara; Toshihiko Kobayashi; Tomio Yasuda; Yukio Okabe
- Record: 10: 6-2-0
- Earnings: ¥159,000,000 JPY

Major wins
- Queen Stakes (1993)

Yukino Bijin (Japanese: ユキノビジン, Hepburn: Yukino Bijin; March 10, 1990 – July 22, 2016) was a Japanese Thoroughbred racehorse and broodmare. Her major victory was the 1993 Queen Stakes. In the same year’s Oka Sho and Yushun Himba, she finished second behind Vega in both races. With a chestnut coat resembling that of her sire, Sakura Yutaka O, and a pure white, ribbon-like braid in her mane, she was highly popular among female fans and was described as a "beautiful girl" and a "good-looking horse."

== Racing career ==
=== 1992: three-year-old season ===
On August 10, 1992, Yukino Bijin made her debut at Morioka Racecourse with Masahiko Onodera in the saddle and won his debut race. Although her background in regional racing would later receive significant attention, she was originally scheduled to join a central racing stable from the start. However, there happened to be no available stalls at Toshio Kubota’s stable where she was supposed to be housed and her owner, Yukikatsu Arai, expressed his intention to "run her on dirt as a 3-year-old." Consequently, she made her debut at Iwate Racecourse on the condition that she would "remain there until a stall became available at Kubota’s stable." Writer Reiko Matsunaga described this situation as "a regional racing 'temporary star.'" She won her second and third races under jockey Isao Sugawara, making it three consecutive victories, and entered the Nambu Koma Sho; however, in that race, she finished fifth behind Ebisu Sakura who would go on to win the Kikata Sho.

=== 1993: four-year-old season ===
At age four, Yukino Bijin was transferred to the Central circuit. Her first race after the transfer was the Crocus Stakes, but she was rated low as the ninth favorite in a field of ten. Furthermore, the owner’s plan to have Yukio Okabe ride her after the transfer had not materialized by this point, so she was ridden by Tomio Yasuda. In the race, she defied the odds, leading from start to finish and beating the second-place finisher, Biko Alpha, by three lengths to win her Central debut. Her next race came after a long layoff: the Oka Sho in April. Entering the race as the fifth favorite, she finished second, tied with Vega on time. In the subsequent Yushun Himba, she again raced near the front but allowed Vega to claim the Fillies’ Double Crown, finishing second for the second consecutive time. During the spring of her four-year-old season, the condition of her hip joint was not ideal; however, the fact that she was able to put up a close fight against Vega under those circumstances suggested that she had the potential for even greater success if her condition improved. After the Yushun Himba, there were plans for her to run in the Radio Nikkei Sho, but she was instead sent to rest. In the fall, she resumed racing with the Queen Stakes, where she won by two lengths over Hokuto Vega, living up to her status as the favorite. In her first race under jockey Okabe, the Queen Elizabeth II Cup, she finished in 10th behind Hokuto Vega, but in the Turquoise Stakes at the end of the year, she secured victory by a length and a half over Alpha Cute. After that, due in part to a fracture in the pastern of her left front leg, she never raced again, and in September 1994, she was removed from the race register and retired to become a broodmare.

== Retirement ==
=== Breeding career ===
After her racing career ended, Yukino Bijin began her breeding career at Murata Ranch, producing a total of 12 foals (9 colts and 3 fillies) over the course of 15 years. However, she never produced a winner of a graded stakes race at either the national or regional levels. Although her conception rate was good, she suffered from poor hoof health, and her legs would ache when she became pregnant; consequently, she retired from breeding in 2010 and continued to live at Murata Ranch as a horse of meritorious service.

c = colt, f = filly

No.	Name	Foaled	Sex	Color	Sire	Races	Wins	Remarks
1st	Kanetsu Leaf	1996	c	Chestnut	Northern Taste	4	0	
2nd	Yukino Quasar	1997	c	Chestnut	Generous	44	3	
3rd	Yukino Attack	1998	c	Chestnut	Forty Niner	41	1	
4th	Yukino Charm	1999	f	Bay	Pilsudski	14	1	Broodmare
5th	Yukino Aether	2001	c	Dark bay	Oath	6	3	
6th	Royal Halo	2003	c	Chestnut	Black Tuxedo			Did not run
7th	Maruhachi Doran	2004	c	Dark bay	Winning Ticket	33	2	
8th	Laurel Wens	2005	c	Bay	Commander in Chief	23	0	
9th	(unnamed)	2006	c	Dark bay	Manhattan Cafe			Pedigree unregistered
10th	Fujino Bowgun	2007	c	Bay	Commander in Chief	8	0	
11th	Haru Zion	2008	f	Chestnut	Timber Country	8	0	Broodmare
12th	Coindol	2009	f	Dark bay	Lincoln	19	4	Broodmare

=== Death & memorial ===
In 2016, she failed to recover even during the time of year when her coat would typically begin to shine, and she died of old age in the pasture on July 22. She was 26 years old at the time of her death. In the spring of 2018, following the accidental death of Charm Asleep, another Murata Farm-bred horse who had won the South Kanto Fillies’ Triple Crown. A memorial plaque was erected for her at Yushun Memorial Park alongside that of Charm Asleep, partly as a gesture of gratitude to the fans.

== In popular culture ==
An anthropomorphized version of Yukino Bijin appears as a character in the Japanese multimedia franchise Umamusume: Pretty Derby, voiced by Nozomi Yamamoto. She is characterized as a sincere, hardworking girl from the rural northern countryside of the Iwate Prefecture, whose humble beginnings working on her family's farm gave her an Iwate dialect (localized as a Southern accent in the global release of the mobile game). Her motivation for racing stems from her dream of becoming an ideal cosmopolitan city girl with the guidance of her role model, Gold City.

== Racing form ==
The following racing form is based on information available on JBIS search and netkeiba.com.

Date	Age	Racecourse	Race	Grade	Distance	Gate	Odds	Fav.	Fin.	Time	Margin	Jockey	Winner (Runner-Up)
Aug 10, 1992	3	Morioka	Three-Year-Old Newcomer	Maiden	D 850m	2		1	1st	0:53.0	-1.0	Masahiko Onodera	(Mitaka Passer)
Aug 31, 1992	3	Morioka	Three-Year-Old Thoroughbreds		D 1420m	4		1	1st	1:33.8	-1.0	Isao Sugawara	(Tohoku Grass)
Sep 14, 1992	3	Morioka	Beginners C1		D 1100m	1		1	1st	1:09.5	-0.6	Isao Sugawara	(Sakamoto Rookie)
Oct 10, 1992	3	Mizusawa	Nambu Koma Sho	Listed	D 1600m	9		2	5th	1:46.5	0.5	Toshihiko Kobayashi	Ebisu Sakura
Feb 27, 1993	4	Nakayama	Crocus Stakes	OP	T 1600m	8	34.3	9	1st	1:34.9	-0.5	Tomio Yasuda	(Biko Alpha)
Apr 11, 1993	4	Hanshin	Oka Sho	G1	T 1600m	2	15.6	5	2nd	1:37.2	0.0	Tomio Yasuda	Vega
May 23, 1993	4	Tokyo	Yushun Himba	G1	T 2400m	9	8.8	3	2nd	2:27.6	0.3	Tomio Yasuda	Vega
Oct 3, 1993	4	Nakayama	Queen Stakes	G3	T 2000m	13	2.4	1	1st	2:02.3	-0.3	Tomio Yasuda	(Hokuto Vega)
Nov 14, 1993	4	Kyoto	Queen Elizabeth II Cup	G1	T 2400m	9	4.0	3	10th	2:26.2	1.3	Yukio Okabe	Hokuto Vega
Dec 18, 1993	4	Nakayama	Turquoise Stakes	OP	T 1800m	6	1.9	1	1st	1:49.4	-0.2	Yukio Okabe	(Alpha Cute)

Legend
D = Dirt
T = Turf

== Pedigree ==
Pedigree of Yukino Bijin (JPN)
Sire Sakura Yutaka O (JPN)	Tesco Boy (GB)	Princely Gift (GB)	Nasrullah (GB)
Sire Sakura Yutaka O (JPN)	Tesco Boy (GB)	Princely Gift (GB)	Blue Gem (GB)
Sire Sakura Yutaka O (JPN)	Tesco Boy (GB)	Suncourt (GB)	Hyperion (GB)
Sire Sakura Yutaka O (JPN)	Tesco Boy (GB)	Suncourt (GB)	Inquisition (GB)
Sire Sakura Yutaka O (JPN)	Angelica (JPN)	Never Beat (GB)	Never Say Die (USA)
Sire Sakura Yutaka O (JPN)	Angelica (JPN)	Never Beat (GB)	Bride Elect (GB)
Sire Sakura Yutaka O (JPN)	Angelica (JPN)	Star Highness (JPN)	Your Highness (GB)
Sire Sakura Yutaka O (JPN)	Angelica (JPN)	Star Highness (JPN)	Star Roch (JPN)
Dam Fatima (JPN)	Royal Ski (USA)	Raja Baba (USA)	Bold Ruler (USA)
Dam Fatima (JPN)	Royal Ski (USA)	Raja Baba (USA)	Missy Baba (USA)
Dam Fatima (JPN)	Royal Ski (USA)	Coz o'Nijinsky (USA)	Involvement (USA)
Dam Fatima (JPN)	Royal Ski (USA)	Coz o'Nijinsky (USA)	Gleam (USA)
Dam Fatima (JPN)	Beauty One (JPN)	Dapper Dan (USA)	Ribot (GB)
Dam Fatima (JPN)	Beauty One (JPN)	Dapper Dan (USA)	So Chic (USA)
Dam Fatima (JPN)	Beauty One (JPN)	Miss Jane (JPN)	Limbo (USA)
Dam Fatima (JPN)	Beauty One (JPN)	Miss Jane (JPN)	Jane (JPN), (Family: 6-a)
