= Kyoto Himba Stakes =

Kyoto Himba Stakes 京都牝馬ステークス
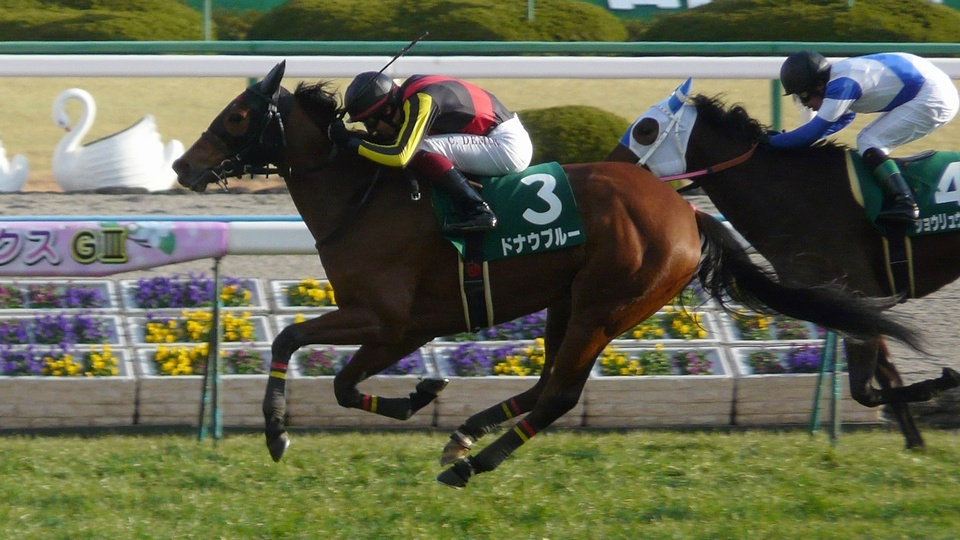
- Donau Blue wins the 2012 Kyoto Himba Stakes
- Class: Grade 3
- Location: Kyoto Racecourse
- Inaugurated: 1966
- Race type: Thoroughbred Flat racing

Race information
- Distance: 1400 metres
- Surface: Turf
- Track: Right-handed
- Qualification: 4-y-o+ fillies and mares
- Weight: 55 kg
- Purse: ¥ 82,380,000 (as of 2024): 1st: ¥ 38,000,000; 2nd: ¥ 15,000,000; 3rd: ¥ 10,000,000

The Kyoto Himba Stakes (Japanese 京都牝馬ステークス) is a defunct Grade 3 horse race organized by Japan Racing Association (JRA) for Thoroughbred fillies and mares aged four and over, run in February over a distance of 1400 metres on turf at Kyoto Racecourse.

The Kyoto Himba Stakes was first run in 1966 and has held Grade 3 status since 1984. The distance was usually 1600 metres before being cut to 1400 metres in 2016. The race was run at Chukyo Racecourse in 1979 and at Hanshin Racecourse in 1980, 1990 and 1994. The race was discontinued in 2025 due to Aichi Hai replacing its schedule in the calendar as well as Kokura Himba Stakes being created to replace the former's schedule.

== Winners since 1990 ==
Year	Winner	Age	Jockey	Trainer	Owner	Time
1990	Rikiai Northern	6	Yutaka Take	Izumi Shimizu	Yukio Takayama	1:34.3
1991	Daiichi Ruby	5	Hiroshi Kawachi	Yuji Ito	Haruo Tsujimoto	1:34.8
1992	Scarlet Bouquet	5	Teruhiko Chida	Yuji Ito	Katsumi Yoshida	1:34.8
1993	Nuevo Tosho	7	Koichi Tsunoda	Sakae Watanabe	Tosho Sangyo	1:34.0
1994	North Flight	5	Yutaka Take	Keiji Kato	Taihoku Farm Co. Ltd.	1:36.8
1995	Sistina	7	Eiji Nakadate	Masakatsu Sakai	Yoshikatsu Murakami	1:33.3
1996	Syourinomegami	6	Olivier Peslier	Kunihiko Take	Yoshio Asakawa	1:34.3
1997	Eishin Berlin	6	Katsumi Minai	Masanori Sakaguchi	Toyomitsu Hirai	1:35.4
1998	Biwa Heidi	6	Olivier Peslier	Mitsumasa Hamada	Biwa Co., Ltd.	1:34.7
1999	Maruka Komachi	5	Yuichi Fukunaga	Shuji Kitahashi	Kawacho Sangyo	1:35.2
2000	Stinger	4	Olivier Peslier	Kazuo Fujisawa	Teruya Yoshida	1:34.9
2001	Grace Namura	5	Tetsuya Kobayashi	Tetsuya Meno	Nobushige Namura	1:35.2
2002	Behind The Mask	6	Yuichi Fukunaga	Shuji Kitahashi	Sunday Racing Co. Ltd.	1:36.0
2003	Happy Path	5	Olivier Peslier	Kazuo Fujisawa	Shadai Race Horse Co. Ltd.	1:34.6
2004	Cheers Message	4	Masaru Honda	Masazo Ryoke	Kiyoko Kitamura	1:34.1
2005	Azuma Sanders	4	Yusuke Fujioka	Kenichi Fujioka	Tetsuji Azuma	1:35.0
2006	Meine Samantha	6	Yasunari Iwata	Hitoshi Nakamura	Thoroughbred Club Ruffian Co. Ltd.	1:33.5
2007	Dia de la Novia	5	Yasunari Iwata	Katsuhiko Sumii	Carrot Farm Co. Ltd.	1:33.0
2008	Admire Kiss	5	Katsumi Ando	Hiroyoshi Matsuda	Riichi Kondo	1:36.0
2009	Celebrita	4	Yutaka Take	Yoshiyuki Arakawa	Mishima Stable	1:35.1
2010	Hikaru Amaranthus	4	Mirco Demuro	Yasuo Ikee	Kyoko Takahashi	1:36.4
2011	Shoryu Moon	4	Suguru Hamanaka	Shozo Sasaki	Wataru Ueda	1:33.7
2012	Donau Blue	4	Cristian Demuro	Sei Ishizaka	Sunday Racing Co. Ltd.	1:33.8
2013	Hana's Goal	4	Suguru Hamanaka	Kazuhiro Kato	Michael Tabart	1:34.3
2014	Uliuli	4	Suguru Hamanaka	Hideaki Fujiwara	Kaneko Makoto Holdings Co. Ltd.	1:33.0
2015	Keiai Elegant	6	Hiroyuki Uchida	Mitsuhiro Ogata	Kazuhiro Kameda	1:33.9
2016	Queens Ring	4	Mirco Demuro	Keiji Yoshimura	Chizu Yoshida	1:22.9
2017	Let's Go Donki	5	Yasunari Iwata	Tomoyuki Umeda	Hirosaki Toshihiro HD Co. Ltd.	1:22.5
2018	Miss Panthere	4	Norihiro Yokoyama	Mitsugu Kon	Chiyono Terada	1:23.0
2019	Dea Regalo	5	Kenichi Ikezoe	Masahito Otake	Sunday Racing Co. Ltd.	1:21.0
2020	Sound Chiara	5	Kohei Matsuyama	Akio Adachi	Yuichi Masuda	1:23.2
2021	Iberis^{[a]}	5	Manabu Sakai	Koichi Tsunoda	Koichi Maeda	1:20.0
2022	Lotus Land^{[a]}	5	Mirai Iwata	Yasuyuki Tsujino	Kobayashi Eiichi Holdings LLC.	1:19.7
2023	La La Christine^{[a]}	5	Akira Sugawara	Takashi Saito	Fujii Kosan	1:20.4
2024	So Dazzling	4	Yutaka Take	Hidetaka Otonashi	Shadai Race Horse Co. Ltd.	1:20.3

^{a} The 2021, 2022 and 2023 runnings took place at Hanshin while Kyoto was closed for renovation.

== Earlier winners ==
- 1966 - Miss Hatsurai O
- 1967 - Maya Midori
- 1968 - Hiro Daikoku
- 1969 - Rikiryu Shingeki
- 1970 - Kunino Hana
- 1971 - Yamani Venus
- 1972 - Seven Arrow
- 1973 - Lady Sport
- 1974 - Aiteishiro
- 1975 - Kabari Danae
- 1976 - Green Fight
- 1977 - Linen Jo O
- 1978 - Inter Gloria
- 1979 - Inter Gloria
- 1980 - Hagino Top Lady
- 1981 - Royal Suzuran
- 1982 - Miss Radical
- 1983 - Toa Mysterious
- 1984 - Calstone Dancer
- 1985 - Fire Dancer
- 1986 - Dominus Rose
- 1987 - Pot Tesco Lady
- 1988 - Mayano Jo O
- 1989 - Rikiai Northern

== See also ==
- Horse racing in Japan
- List of Japanese flat horse races
