= Lauda Sion (horse) =

Japanese racehorse

Lauda Sion; ラウダシオン
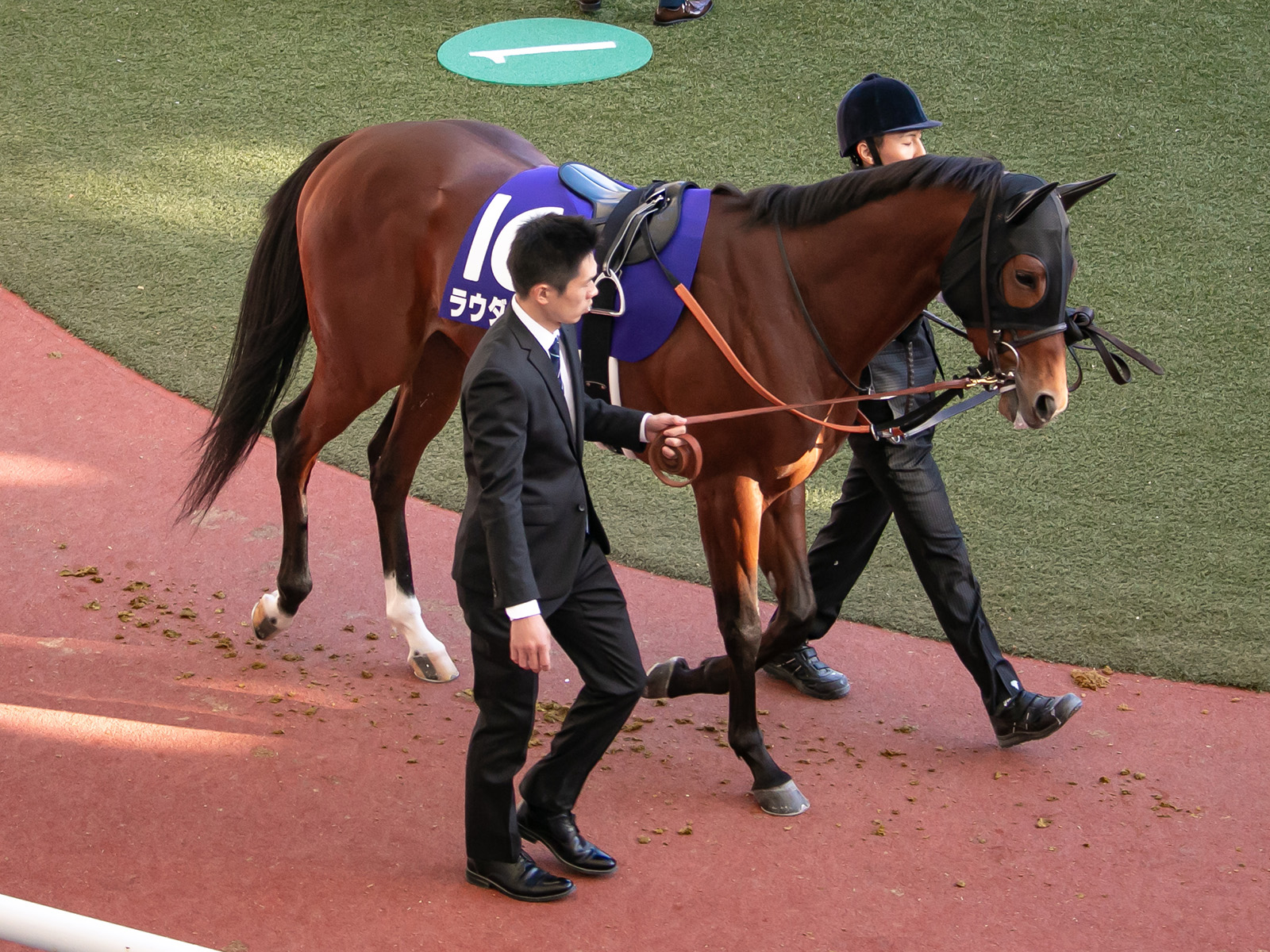
- Lauda Sion at Hanshin in December 2019
- Sire: Real Impact
- Grandsire: Deep Impact
- Dam: Antiphona
- Damsire: Songandaprayer
- Sex: Stallion
- Foaled: 2 February 2017
- Country: Japan
- Colour: Bay
- Breeder: Shiraoi Farm/ Shunsuke Yoshida
- Owner: Silk Racing Co. Ltd.
- Racing colours
- Trainer: Takashi Saito
- Jockey: Mirco Demuro
- Record: 26: 5-2-3
- Earnings: ¥301,468,400

Major wins
- Crocus Stakes (2020); NHK Mile Cup (2020); Keio Hai Spring Cup (2021)

Lauda Sion (Japanese: ラウダシオン, foaled 2 February 2017) is a Japanese Thoroughbred racehorse. He showed promise as a two-year-old in 2019 when he won two of four races and finished third in the Kokura Nisai Stakes. In the following year he won the Crocus Stakes and ran second in the Falcon Stakes before taking the Grade 1 NHK Mile Cup.

== Background ==
Lauda Sion is a bay colt with a small white star and white socks on his hind legs bred in Japan by the Shadai Corporation's Shiraoi Farm. He entered the ownership of Silk Racing was sent into training with Takashi Saito. The colt's name is derived from Lauda Sion, a Christian hymn written by Thomas Aquinas.

He was from the first crop of foals sired by Real Impact who won the Yasuda Kinen in Japan and the George Ryder Stakes in Australia. Lauda Sion's dam, the Kentucky-bred Antiphona, showed modest racing ability winning one minor race from six starts in Japan. She was a great-granddaughter of the broodmare Carol's Christmas (foaled 1977) whose other descendants have included Olympio (Hollywood Derby), Pyro and Tapizar.

== Racing career ==
=== 2019: two-year-old season ===
Lauda Sion made a successful racecourse debut at Hanshin Racecourse on 22 June when he won an event for previously unraced juveniles over 1200 metres of firm ground. After an absence of over two months he returned to the track and was stepped up in class to contest the Grade 3 Kokura Nisai Stakes over 1200 metres at Kokura Racecourse and started at odds of 7.5/1 in a fourteen-runner field. Ridden by Yutaka Take he finished third behind Meiner Grit and Triple Ace, beaten a neck and half a length. On 12 October over 1400 metres on heavy ground at Kyoto Racecourse the colt was ridden by Christophe Lemaire when he started favourite for the Momiji Stakes and won by one and a half lengths from Lotus Land. For his final run of the season Lauda Sion was moved up to the highest class for the Grade 1 Asahi Hai Futurity Stakes over 1600 metres at Hanshin on 15 December and went off a 17/1 outsider. Before the race Saito said "He has been a little unruly in the gate previously, so he has had practice with this and getting a good start, and he does seem more relaxed now... The horse generally gives everything he's got, and having raced at Hanshin before, I’m looking forward to what he can do here". In the event, Lauda Sion was never in serious contention and came home eighth of the sixteen runners, six and a quarter lengths behind the winner Salios.

In the official Japanese rankings for two-year-olds of 2019, Lauda Sion was given a rating of 103, making him the 28th best juvenile colt of the year.

=== 2020: three-year-old season ===
On 1 February, Lauda Sion began his second campaign in the Listed Crocus Stakes over 1400 metres at Tokyo Racecourse and started the 4.5/1 third favourite behind Absolutismo and Armbrust. Partnered by Take he led from the start and won by two lengths from Harmony Magellan with Zenno Justa one and a quarter lengths back in third. On 14 March the colt started the 1.7/1 favourite for the Grade 3 Falcon Stakes over 1400 metres at Chukyo Racecourse and finished second, beaten one and a half lengths by Shine Garnet.

In the Grade 1 NHK Mile Cup at Tokyo on 10 May Lauda Sion was ridden by Mirco Demuro and started at odds of 28.6/1 in an eighteen-runner field. Before the race Saito commented "It's a stretch, but I think he can handle 1,600 meters. He's more settled than he was before, a lot more mature and his balance is good now too. I think he can wait patiently enough. The competition is tough but I'm hoping he'll run a good race". The filly Resistencia started favourite while the other contenders included Taisei Vision (Arlington Cup), Satono Impresa (Mainichi Hai), Luftstrom (New Zealand Trophy), Shine Garnet and Harmony Magellan. Lauda Sion broke quickly and settled in second place behind Resistencia before moving ahead of the filly in the straight. He drew away in the closing stages to win by one and a half lengths from Resistenceia with another filly, Gilded Mirror, taking third ahead of Taisei Vision. After the race Demuro said "I knew that the track today ran better for front runners, and considering that he's usually an evenly-paced colt, I planned to keep him well up in front. He's always quick out of the gate so we were able to secure a good position and I felt he had plenty to outrun [Resistencia] in the final stages."

Lauda Sion returned to the track after an absence of over five months in the Grade 2 Fuji Stakes over 1600 metres at Tokyo on 24 October. He raced in third place for most of the way he took the lead in the straight but was overtaken in the closing stages and beaten one and a quarter lengths into second place by the four-year-old Vin de Garde. The colt then contested the Mile Championship over the same distance at Hanshin on 22 November but after tracking the leader Resistencia and turning into the straight in second place he faded badly in the closing stages and finished unplaced behind Gran Alegria.

=== 2021: four-year-old season ===
Lauda Sion started the season with a race in the Silk Road Stakes. He ran well in this sprint race as he changed his speed well in the straight and finished in third place. This result encouraged the team to try him for the Takamatsunomiya Kinen. This decision was not a good move as he fallen out the lead pack 200 metres from the line even though he had a good start. He ended up in 14th-place. On May, he ran in the Keio Hai Spring Cup. When the race began, he got off to a good start and secured second place. Lauda Sion then took the lead just over a furlong from the finish and shaking off Travesura, who was closing in from behind to claim his first victory in a year and his second graded race win. Then, the team picked him to race in the Yasuda Kinen. He started well and marked the leader at 3rd position mostly but he lost out in the final 200 metres and finished in last place at 14th. On the second part of his career, he ran in three more races and finished unplaced in all three.

=== 2022 – 2023: Later seasons and retirements ===
In 2022, He went to the middle seas as he raced in 1351 Turf Sprint and Al Quoz Sprint competitions. He finished in fourth and ninth respectively on the overseas trip. When he returned back, he tried to defend his title back in the Keio Hai Spring Cup. This time, he went off with a good start but failed to unleash his power on the final phase and ended up in fifth place. Just like the previous years, he slumped in the autumn campaign except on the season-closer race where he finished at third place in the Hanshin Cup.

Lauda Sion tried for the overseas campaign again in the next season. This time, he ran in the 1351 Turf Sprint and the Godolphin Mile. He finished in ninth and eleventh-place respectively on those races. On May 11th, it was announced that after his third participation in the Keio Hai Spring Cup, he would be transferred to Australia and began his career a stud, thus ending his racing career. At that race, he ran straight into second place when he broke away early, but was overtaken by the following horses and finished in seventh place. After his transferred, he did race once again in the Doveton Stakes, a listed race in the Caulfield Racecourse. Jockeyed by Damian Lane, they finished in 12th-place on that race. After the race, he would be retired and assigned as a stud at Larneuk Stud in Victoria, Australia.

== Racing form ==
Lauda Sion won five races out of 26 starts. This data is available in JBIS, netkeiba, racingpost and Racing Australia.

Date	Track	Race	Grade	Distance (Condition)	Entry	HN	Odds (Favored)	Finish	Time	Margins	Jockey	Winner (Runner-up)
2019 – two-year-old season
Jun 22	Hanshin	2yo Newcomer		1,200 m (Firm)	8	7	1.5 (1)	1st	1:10.7	–0.2	Yuichi Fukunaga	(Reinforce)
Sep 1	Kokura	Kokura Nisai Stakes	3	1,200 m (Soft)	14	3	8.5 (4)	3rd	1:10.6	0.1	Yutaka Take	Meiner Grit
Oct 12	Kyoto	Momiji Stakes	OP	1,400 m (Heavy)	11	10	2.6 (1)	1st	1:24.1	–0.2	Christophe Lemaire	(Lotus Land)
Dec 15	Hanshin	Asahi Hai Futurity Stakes	1	1,600 m (Firm)	16	16	18.0 (6)	8th	1:34.0	1.0	Christophe Lemaire	Salios
2020 – three-year-old season
Feb 1	Tokyo	Crocus Stakes	L	1,400 m (Firm)	10	9	5.5 (3)	1st	1:21.2	–0.3	Yutaka Take	(Harmony Magellan)
Mar 14	Chukyo	Falcon Stakes	3	1,400 m (Soft)	18	10	2.7 (1)	2nd	1:21.5	0.2	Yutaka Take	Shine Garnet
May 10	Tokyo	NHK Mile Cup	1	1,600 m (Firm)	18	11	29.6 (9)	1st	1:32.5	–0.2	Mirco Demuro	(Resistencia)
Oct 24	Tokyo	Fuji Stakes	2	1,600 m (Firm)	12	11	6.2 (3)	2nd	1:33.6	0.2	Mirco Demuro	Vin de Garde
Nov 22	Hanshin	Mile Championship	1	1,600 m (Firm)	17	6	32.6 (6)	15th	1:33.2	1.2	Yutaka Take	Gran Alegria
2021 – four-year-old season
Jan 31	Chukyo	Silk Road Stakes	3	1,200 m (Firm)	18	12	4.7 (2)	3rd	1:08.5	0.2	Mirco Demuro	Shivaji
Mar 28	Chukyo	Takamatsunomiya Kinen	1	1,200 m (Soft)	18	10	7.1 (5)	14th	1:10.1	0.9	Mirco Demuro	Danon Smash
May 15	Tokyo	Keio Hai Spring Cup	2	1,400 m (Firm)	17	10	4.1 (1)	1st	1:19.8	0.0	Mirco Demuro	(Travesura)
Jun 6	Tokyo	Yasuda Kinen	1	1,600 m (Firm)	14	7	27.9 (7)	14th	1:34.5	2.8	Mirco Demuro	Danon Kingly
Sep 12	Chukyo	Centaur Stakes	2	1,200 m (Firm)	17	3	14.6 (5)	13th	1:08.2	1.0	Mirco Demuro	Resistencia
Oct 23	Tokyo	Fuji Stakes	2	1,600 m (Firm)	17	8	12.0 (6)	8th	1:33.9	0.7	Mirco Demuro	Songline
Dec 25	Hanshin	Hanshin Cup	2	1,400 m (Firm)	18	4	19.5 (7)	11th	1:21.3	1.0	Mirco Demuro	Grenadier Guards
2022 – five-year-old season
Feb 26	King Abdulaziz	1351 Turf Sprint	3	1,351 m (Firm)	14	6	20/1 (10)	4th	1:18.8	0.8	Cristian Demuro	Songline
Mar 26	Meydan	Al Quoz Sprint	1	1,200 m (Firm)	16	9	28/1 (8)	9th	1:10.2	1.4	Cristian Demuro	A Case of You
May 14	Tokyo	Keio Hai Spring Cup	2	1,400 m (Firm)	12	10	13.8 (7)	5th	1:20.5	0.3	Mirco Demuro	Meikei Yell
Aug 25	Saga	Summer Champion	JPN3	1,400 m (Muddy)	12	6	8.2 (4)	12th	1:30.1	4.6	Mirco Demuro	Shamal
Oct 22	Tokyo	Fuji Stakes	2	1,600 m (Firm)	15	12	43.5 (10)	8th	1:33.1	1.1	Akira Sugawara	Serifos
Dec 24	Hanshin	Hanshin Cup	2	1,400 m (Firm)	18	3	44.9 (11)	3rd	1:20.3	0.1	Bauyrzhan Murzabayev	Diatonic
2023 – six-year-old season
Feb 25	King Abdulaziz	1351 Turf Sprint	3	1,351 m (Firm)	11	4	16/1 (8)	9th	1:18.4	0.9	Bauyrzhan Murzabayev	Bathrat Leon
Mar 25	Meydan	Godolphin Mile	2	1,600 m (Fast)	14	9	33/1 (11)	11th	1:40.1	4.4	Bauyrzhan Murzabayev	Isolate
May 13	Tokyo	Keio Hai Spring Cup	2	1,400 m (Firm)	18	14	18.6 (9)	7th	1:20.7	0.4	Yasunari Iwata	Red Mon Reve
Dec 2	Caulfield	Doveton Stakes	L	1,200 m (Soft)	12	1	9.5 (4)	12th	1:13.6	2.9	Damian Lane	Ghaanati

Legend:
Turf Dirt

== Pedigree ==
Pedigree of Lauda Sion (JPN), bay colt, 2017
Sire Real Impact (JPN) 2008	Deep Impact (JPN); 2002	Sunday Silence (USA)	Halo
Sire Real Impact (JPN) 2008	Deep Impact (JPN); 2002	Sunday Silence (USA)	Wishing Well
Sire Real Impact (JPN) 2008	Deep Impact (JPN); 2002	Wind In Her Hair (IRE)	Alzao (USA)
Sire Real Impact (JPN) 2008	Deep Impact (JPN); 2002	Wind In Her Hair (IRE)	Burghclere (GB)
Sire Real Impact (JPN) 2008	Tokio Reality (USA); 1994	Meadowlake	Hold Your Peace
Sire Real Impact (JPN) 2008	Tokio Reality (USA); 1994	Meadowlake	Suspicious Native
Sire Real Impact (JPN) 2008	Tokio Reality (USA); 1994	What A Reality	In Reality
Sire Real Impact (JPN) 2008	Tokio Reality (USA); 1994	What A Reality	What Will Be
Dam Antiphona (USA) 2008	Songandaprayer (USA); 1998	Unbridled's Song	Unbridled
Dam Antiphona (USA) 2008	Songandaprayer (USA); 1998	Unbridled's Song	Trolley Song
Dam Antiphona (USA) 2008	Songandaprayer (USA); 1998	Alizea	Premiership
Dam Antiphona (USA) 2008	Songandaprayer (USA); 1998	Alizea	Fancy Medallion
Dam Antiphona (USA) 2008	Snatched (USA); 2004	Cat Thief	Storm Cat
Dam Antiphona (USA) 2008	Snatched (USA); 2004	Cat Thief	Train Robbery
Dam Antiphona (USA) 2008	Snatched (USA); 2004	Christmas Star	Star de Naskra
Dam Antiphona (USA) 2008	Snatched (USA); 2004	Christmas Star	Carols Christmas (Family: 8-d)
