= Crocus Stakes =

Japanese thoroughbred race

Crocus Stakes クロッカスステークス
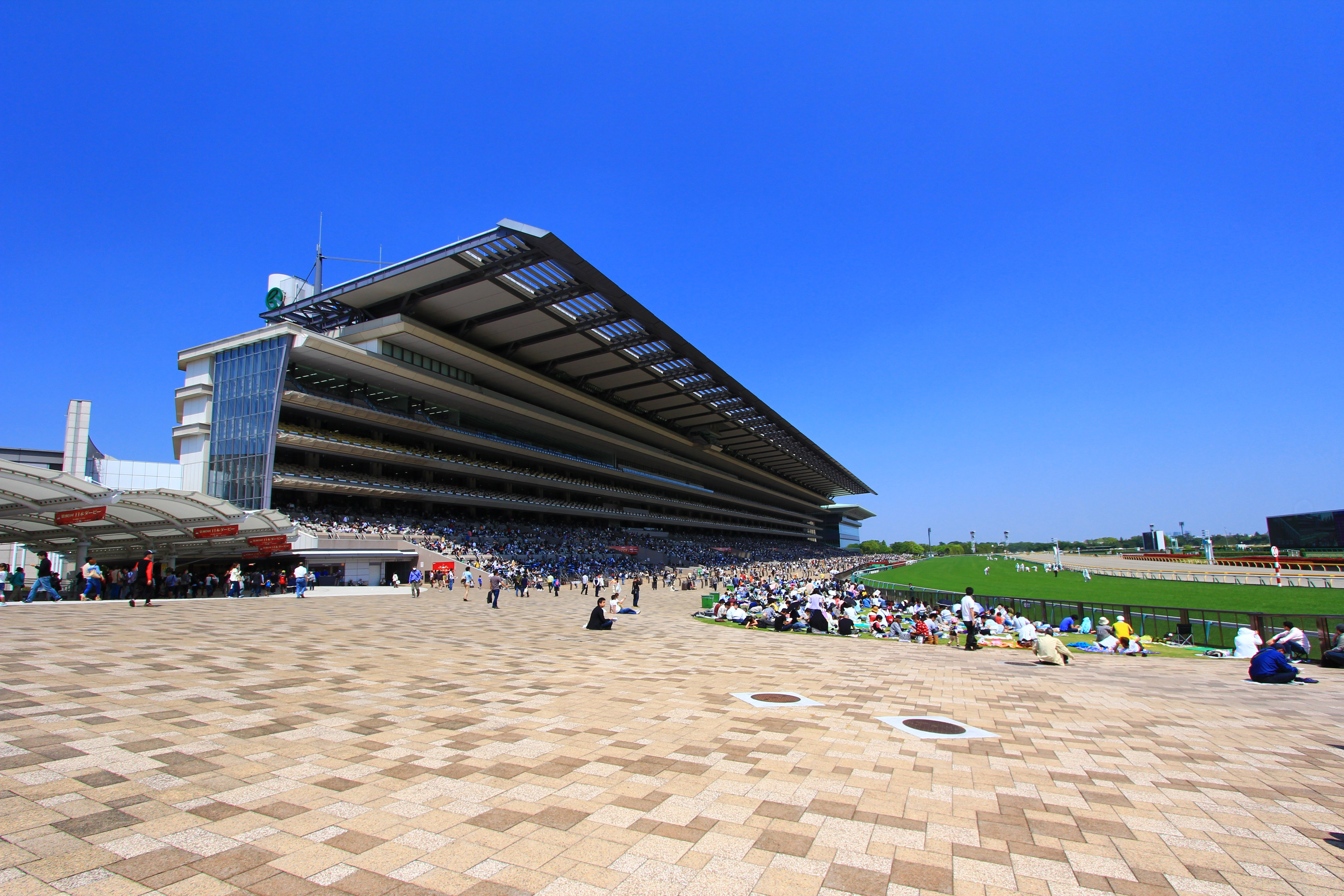
- Tokyo Racecourse
- Class: Listed
- Location: Tokyo Racecourse
- Inaugurated: February 26th, 1989
- Race type: Thoroughbred - Flat racing

Race information
- Distance: 1,400 meters
- Surface: Turf
- Qualification: Three-year-olds
- Weight: 53kg-56kg
- Purse: ¥ 43,200,000 (as of 2024): 1st: ¥ 20,000,000; 2nd: ¥ 8,000,000; 3rd: ¥ 5,000,000

The Crocus Stakes (in Japanese: クロッカスステークス), is a Japanese horse race for three-year-old Thoroughbreds run at Tokyo Racecourse.

== Race details ==
The race debuted on February 26, 1989. The race is for three-year-olds and is a 1,400 meter turf race. The race has usually been run in either January or February. The race is designated as listed race and open to international horses since 2019.

== Winners since 2015 ==
Winners since 2015 include:

Year	Winner	Jockey	Trainer	Owner	Time
2015	Nishino Rush	Hironobu Tanabe	Yasuhito Tamura	Shigeyuki Nishiyama	1:22.7
2016	Tosho Drafter	Hironobu Tanabe	Koji Kayano	Tosho Sangyo	1:21.7
2017	Time Trip	Keita Tosaki	Masatoshi Kikukawa	Yuko Nakamura	1:22.2
2018	Ryono Tesoro	Hayato Yoshida	Ryo Takei	Kenji Ryotokuji	1:22.3
2019	Dixie Knight	Oisin Murphy	Sakae Kunieda	Carrot Farm	1:22.2
2020	Lauda Sion	Yutaka Take	Takashi Saito	Silk Racing	1:21.2
2021	Stripe	Hironobu Tanabe	Kazuyuki Ogata	Toshio Sato	1:22.2
2022	Toshin Macau	Keita Tosaki	Mizuki Takayanagi	Sato	1:21.8
2023	Yakushima	Christophe Lemaire	Ryo Terashima	Godolphin	1:21.1
2024	Logi Leon	Kousei Miura	Masaaki Koga	Masaaki Kumeda	1:20.9
2025	Craspedia	Ryoya Kozaki	Hiroki Kawashima	Yoshihiro Tsukada	1:22.9
2026	Hornero	Chirstophe Lemaire	Keisuke Miyata	Carrot Farm	1:20.7

== Past winners ==
Past winners include:

- 1989:Hitting Eight
- 1990:Futaba Asakaze
- 1991: Nihon Pillow Luck
- 1992: Reward Garcon
- 1993: Yukino Bijin
- 1994: Fujino Makken O
- 1995: Gary Gold
- 1996: Dandy Commando
- 1997: Speed World
- 1998: Sugino Cutie
- 1999: Red Chili Pepper
- 2000: Kinishi Stone
- 2001: Little Soldier
- 2002: Cafe Bostonian
- 2003: Tosen Orion
- 2004: Seeking the Dia
- 2005: Paris Brest
- 2006: Admire Carib
- 2007: Surplus Singer
- 2008: Marubutsu Easter
- 2009: San Carlo
- 2010: Impress Winner
- 2011: Forever Mark
- 2012: Sacred Reve
- 2013: Sea Breeze Life
- 2014: Meiner Diavel

== See also ==
- Horse racing in Japan
- List of Japanese flat horse races
