= Kokura Himba Stakes =

Kokura Himba Stakes 小倉牝馬ステークス
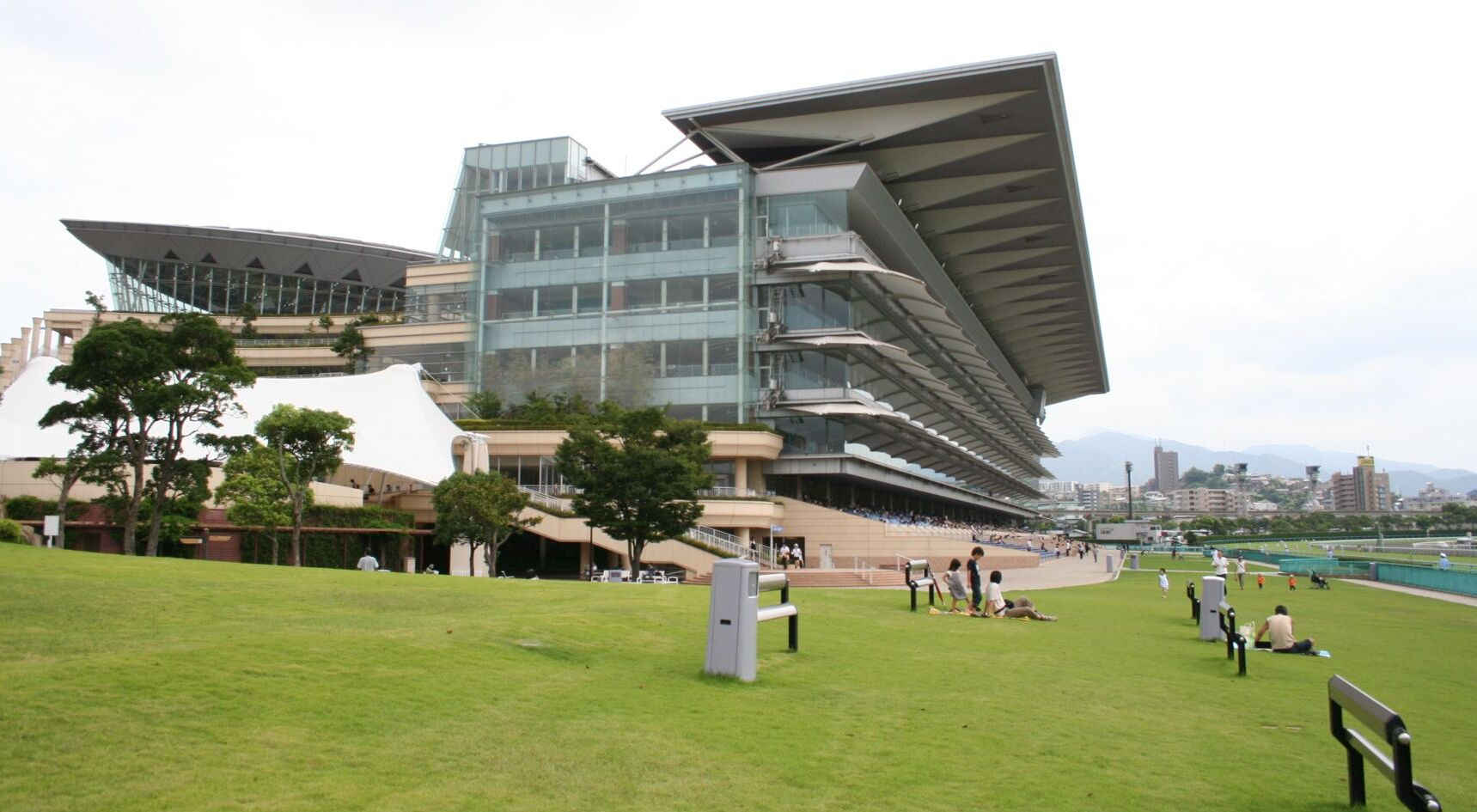
- Kokura Racecourse
- Class: Grade 3
- Location: Kokura Racecourse
- Inaugurated: January 25, 2025
- Race type: Thoroughbred Flat racing

Race information
- Distance: 2,000 meters
- Surface: Turf
- Track: Right-handed
- Qualification: 4-y-o + fillies and mares
- Weight: Handicap
- Purse: ¥ 82,380,000 (as of 2026): 1st: ¥ 38,000,000; 2nd: ¥ 15,000,000; 3rd: ¥ 10,000,000

The Kokura Himba Stakes (小倉牝馬ステークス) is a Grade 3 (GIII) flat horse race in Japan.

== Background ==
The Kokura Himba Stakes is a Grade III Thoroughbred handicap race in Japan, restricted exclusively to mares aged four years and older. It is held annually in late January at Kokura Racecourse over a distance of 2,000 meters on turf. Eligible entrants must have raced at least once between January 20, 2024, and January 22, 2025, and unraced or maiden horses are excluded. The field includes JRA-trained mares, up to two certified NAR (local) mares, and foreign-trained mares with priority entry. As a handicap race, weights are assigned by the racing secretary based on each mare’s past performance. The first-place prize in 2026 was ¥38 million.

== History ==
The Kokura Himba Stakes is a newly established race, with its inaugural running held on January 25, 2025, at Kokura Racecourse. It was created as part of a major restructuring of JRA’s stakes calendar announced on September 23, 2024. Specifically, it inherits the timing (January), grade (GIII), distance (2,000m), surface (turf), and handicap format of the former Aichi Hai, which had been run at Chukyo Racecourse. Concurrently, the Aichi Hai itself was reconfigured to adopt the conditions of the former Kyoto Himba Stakes, moving to March and shortening to 1,400 meters.

Although it carries forward the competitive role of the Aichi Hai, the Kokura Himba Stakes is officially designated as a brand-new stakes race, with its first edition counted as “第1回” (1st running) per the Spring 2025 racing program announced on November 17, 2024. The inaugural 2025 edition resulted in a dead heat between two mares: Verehrung (牝5) and Scintillation (牝6), both trained by prominent JRA stables and ridden by veteran jockeys.

== Past winners ==
Year	Winner	Age	Length (in m)	Jockey	Trainer	Owner	Time
2025 (dh)	Verehrung	5	T2000	Yuji Tannai	Shoichiro Wada	Thoroughbred Club Ruffian Co. Ltd.	1:58.4
2025 (dh)	Scintillation	6	T2000	Makoto Sugihara	Masakazu Ikegami	Silk Racing Co. Ltd.	1:58.4
2026	Jocelyn	4	T2000	Christophe Lemaire	Yūichi Shikato	Kazumi Yoshida	1:58.1

== See also ==
- Horse racing in Japan
- List of Japanese flat horse races

=== Netkeiba ===
- 2025 en, 2026 en
