= Queen Stakes =

Queen Stakes クイーンステークス
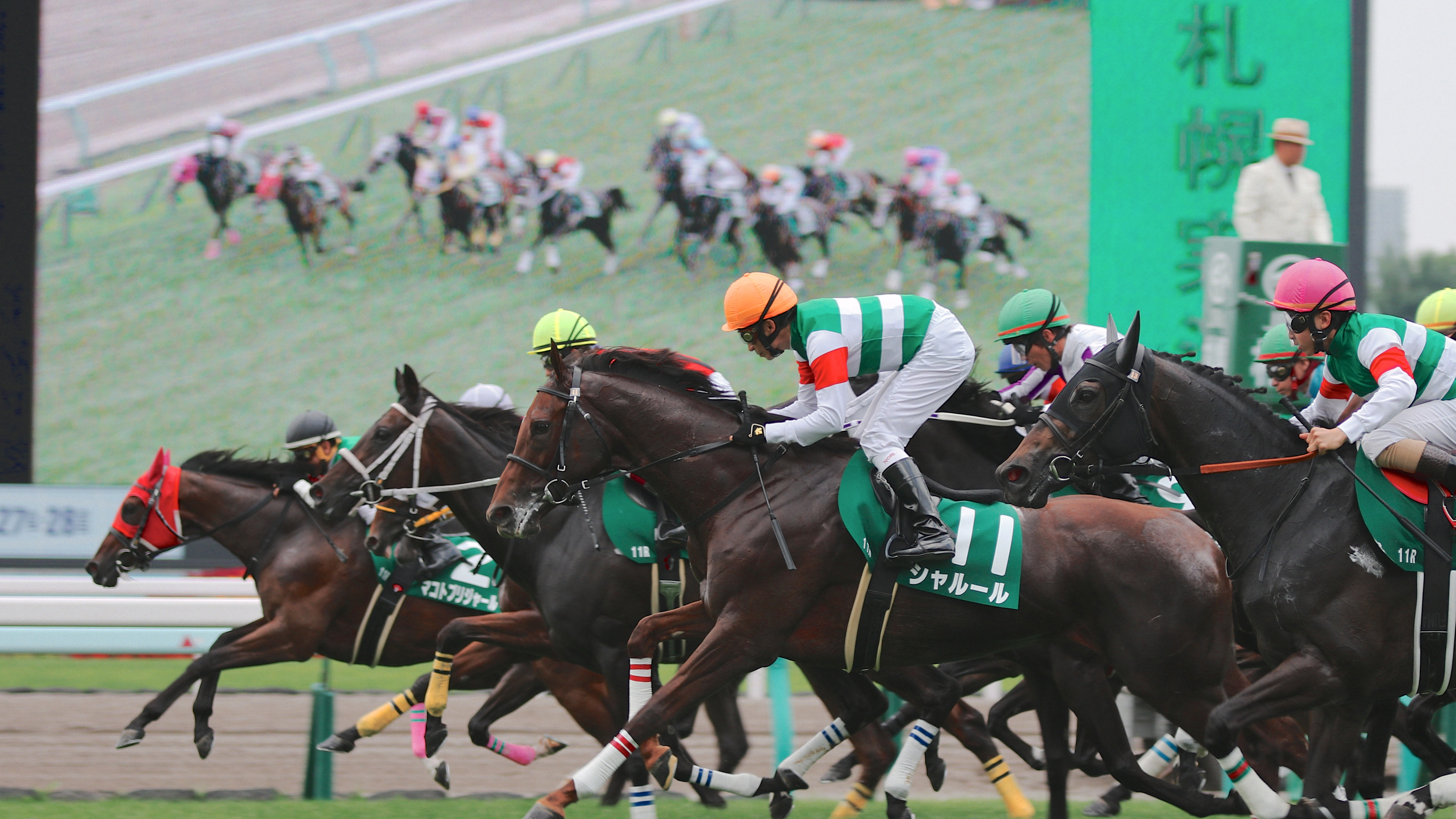
- The finish of the 2016 Queen Stakes
- Class: Grade 3
- Location: Sapporo Racecourse
- Inaugurated: 1953
- Race type: Thoroughbred Flat racing

Race information
- Distance: 1800 meters
- Surface: Turf
- Track: Right-handed
- Qualification: 3-y-o+ fillies and mares
- Weight: Special Weight
- Purse: ¥ 82,380,000 (as of 2024): 1st: ¥ 38,000,000; 2nd: ¥ 15,000,000; 3rd: ¥ 10,000,000

The Queen Stakes (Japanese クイーンステークス) is a Japanese Grade 3 horse race for Thoroughbred fillies and mares aged three and over, run in late July or early August over a distance of 1800 meters on turf at Sapporo Racecourse.

The Queen Stakes was first run in 1953 and has held Grade 3 status since 1984. The distance of the race was originally 2000 meters but was reduced to 1800 meters in 1996. The race was usually run at either Tokyo Racecourse or Nakayama Racecourse before moving to its current venue in 2000.

== Weight ==
51 kg for three-year-old, 55 kg for four-year-old and above.

Allowances:

- 2 kg for southern hemisphere bred three-year-old
- 1 kg for southern hemisphere bred four-year-old

Penalties (excluding two-year-old race performance):

- If a graded stakes race has been won within a year:
  - 3 kg for a grade 1 win
  - 2 kg for a grade 2 win
  - 1 kg for a grade 3 win
- If a graded stakes race has been won for more than a year:
  - 2 kg for a grade 1 win
  - 1 kg for a grade 2 win

== Winners since 2000 ==
Year	Winner	Age	Jockey	Trainer	Owner	Time
2000	To The Victory	4	Shinji Fujita	Yasuo Ikee	Makoto Kaneko	1:46.8
2001	Yamakatsu Suzuran	4	Kenichi Ikezoe	Kaneo Ikezoe	Hiroyasu Yamada	1:47.4
2002	Mitsuwa Top Lady	5	Teruhiko Chida	Sakae Watanabe	Takasho	1:48.1
2003	Osumi Haruka	3	Shinji Kawashima	Masatoshi Ando	Hidenori Yamaji	1:47.7
2004	Osumi Haruka	4	Shinji Kawashima	Masatoshi Ando	Hidenori Yamaji	1:47.5
2005	Les Clefs d'Or	4	Masayoshi Ebina	Yasuo Ikee	Sunday Racing	1:46.7
2006	Daring Heart	4	Shinji Fujita	Hideaki Fujiwara	Shadai Race Horse	1:46.7
2007	Asahi Rising	4	Yoshitomi Shibata	Masaaki Koga	Masamitsu Terauchi	1:46.7
2008	Yamaninmerveilleux	6	Yuichi Shibayama	Hironori Kurita	Hajime Doi	1:48.1
2009	Piena Venus	5	Yoshihiro Furukawa	Katsumi Minai	Kenzo Mototani	1:48.2
2010	Apricot Fizz	3	Yutaka Take	Futoshi Kojima	Shadai Race Horse	1:47.6
2011	Aventura	3	Kenichi Ikezoe	Katsuhiko Sumii	Carrot Farm	1:46.6
2012	I'm Yours	3	Kenichi Ikezoe	Takahisa Tezuka	Your Story	1:47.2
2013	I'm Yours	4	Keita Tosaki	Takahisa Tezuka	Your Story	1:49.4
2014	Quatre Feuilles	5	Yuichi Fukunaga	Katsuhiko Sumii	Lord Horse Club	1:45.7
2015	Meisho Suzanna	6	Daisaku Matsuda	Yoshitada Takahashi	Yoshitaka Matsumoto	1:47.1
2016	Makoto Brillar	6	Hirofumi Shii	Ippo Sameshima	Diamant	1:47.7
2017	Aerolithe	3	Norihiro Yokoyama	Takanori Kikuzawa	Sunday Racing	1:45.7
2018	Deirdre	4	Christophe Lemaire	Mitsuru Hashida	Toji Morita	1:46.2
2019	Mikki Charm	4	Yuga Kawada	Mitsumasa Nakauchida	Mizuki Noda	1:47.0
2020	Red Anemos	4	Hayato Yoshida	Yasuo Tomomichi	Tokyo Horse Racing	1:45.9
2021	Terzetto	4	Christophe Lemaire	Shoichiro Wada	Silk Racing	1:47.8
2022	Terzetto	5	Kenichi Ikezoe	Shoichiro Wada	Silk Racing	1:47.8
2023	Dura	3	Arata Saito	Yasuyuki Takahashi	Cypress Holdings	1:46.7
2024	Koganeno Sora	3	Yuji Tannai	Takanori Kikuzawa	Big Red Farm	1:47.4
2025	Argine	5	Yuga Kawada	Mitsumasa Nakauchida	Lord Horse Club	1:46.0
2026	Coconuts Brown	6	Yuichi Kitamura	Hiroyuki Uemura	Takayuki Shimokobe	1:46.1

== Earlier winners ==
- 1953 - Cheerio
- 1954 - Komano Hana
- 1955 - Blessing
- 1956 - Akatsuki
- 1957 - Miss Seiha
- 1958 - Miss Marusa
- 1959 -Miss Higashi O
- 1960 - Chidori
- 1961 - Ezokozan
- 1962 - Ryu Z
- 1963 - Miss Toyopet
- 1964 - Flower Wood
- 1965 - Kikuno Suzuran
- 1966 - Kiyo Shigeru
- 1967 - Mejiro Asahi
- 1968 - Hardware
- 1969 - Meiji Aster
- 1970 - Harbor Games
- 1971 - Poppy Onward
- 1972 - Takaihoma
- 1973 - Hida Kogane
- 1974 - Toko Elsa
- 1975 - Anselmo
- 1976 - Nissho Dia
- 1977 - Pretty Akatsuki
- 1978 - Ban Passer
- 1979 - Hazama Fast
- 1980 - Takeno Happy
- 1981 - Super Fast
- 1982 - Victoria Crown
- 1983 - Sweet Brest
- 1984 - Happy Uroton
- 1985 - Asakusa Scale
- 1986 - Royal Silky
- 1987 - Strong Lady
- 1988 - Free Talk
- 1989 - Mejiro Monterey
- 1990 - Winners Gold
- 1991 - Inazuma Cross
- 1992 - Shinko Lovely
- 1993 - Yukino Bijin
- 1994 - Hishi Amazon
- 1995 - Sakura Candle
- 1996 - Rainbow Queen
- 1997 - Promotion
- 1998 - Air Deja Vu
- 1999 - Air Zion

== See also ==
- Horse racing in Japan
- List of Japanese flat horse races
