= Turquoise Stakes =

Turquoise Stakes ターコイズステークス
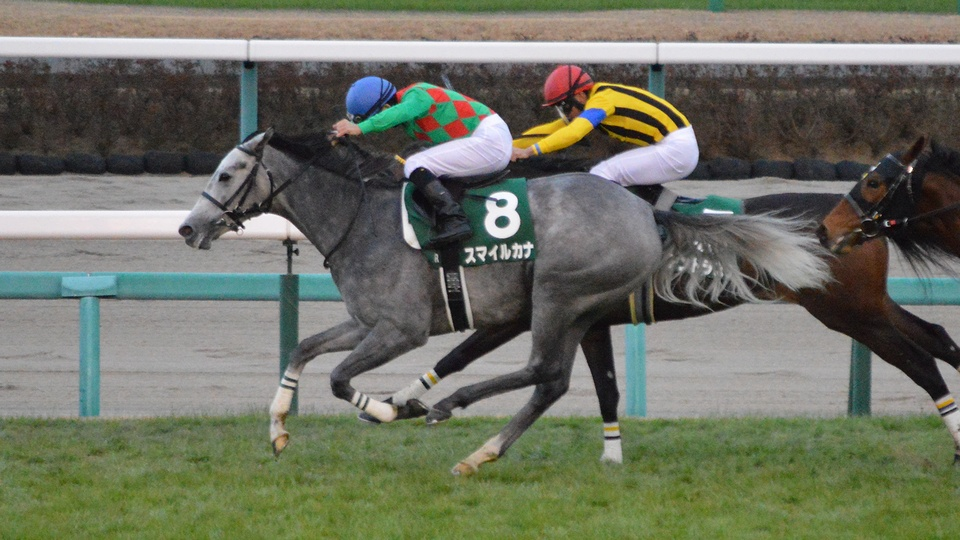
- Smile Kana wins the 2020 Turquoise Stakes
- Class: Grade 3
- Location: Nakayama Racecourse
- Inaugurated: 2015
- Race type: Thoroughbred Flat racing

Race information
- Distance: 1600 metres
- Surface: Turf
- Track: Right-handed
- Qualification: 3-y-o+ fillies and mares
- Weight: Handicap
- Purse: ¥ 82,380,000 (as of 2025): 1st: ¥ 38,000,000; 2nd: ¥ 15,000,000; 3rd: ¥ 10,000,000

The Turquoise Stakes (Japanese ターコイズステークス) is a Japanese Grade 3 horse race for Thoroughbred fillies and mares aged three and over. It is run in December over a distance of 1600 metres on turf at Nakayama Racecourse, in Funabashi, Chiba.

It was first run in 2015 and has held Grade 3 status since 2017.

== Winners since 2015 ==
Year	Winner	Age	Jockey	Trainer	Owner	Time
2015	Sing With Joy	3	Keita Tosaki	Yasuo Tomomichi	Shadai Race Horse	1:35.7
2016	Magic Time	5	Christophe Lemaire	Tadashige Nakagawa	Sunday Racing	1:33.6
2017	Miss Panthere	3	Norihiro Yokoyama	Mitsugu Kon	Chiyono Terada	1:34.2
2018	Miss Panthere	4	Norihiro Yokoyama	Mitsugu Kon	Chiyono Terada	1:32.7
2019	Contra Check	3	Christophe Lemaire	Kazuo Fujisawa	Carrot Farm	1:32.2
2020	Smile Kana	3	Daichi Shibata	Yoshiyasu Takahashi	Shigeyuki Okada	1:34.6
2021	Miss New York	4	Mirco Demuro	Haruki Sugiyama	Takaaki Farm	1:32.8
2022	Miss New York	5	Mirco Demuro	Haruki Sugiyama	Takaaki Farm	1:33.5
2023	Fierce Pride	5	Christophe Lemaire	Sakae Kunieda	Godolphin	1:32.7
2024	Argine	4	Atsuya Nishimura	Mitsumasa Nakauchida	Lord Horse Club	1:33.2
2025	Drop of Light	6	Fuma Matsuwaka	Yuichi Fukunaga	Makio Okada	1:33.0

== Earlier Winners ==
- 1982 - Peerless Lady
- 1983 - Dyna Carle
- 1984 - Liberty Bell
- 1985 - Asakusa Scale
- 1986 - Metis
- 1987 - Mejiro Fulmar
- 1988 - Kuri Rotary
- 1989 - Lady Gossip
- 1990 - Yukino Sunrise
- 1991 - Kyoei Tap
- 1992 - Scarlet Bouquet
- 1993 - Yukino Bijin
- 1994 - Brand Noble
- 1995 - Spring Verbena
- 1996 - Kurokami
- 1997 - Luminescence
- 1998 - Reward Ninfa
- 1999 - Sakura Akatsuki
- 2000 - Christmas Tree
- 2001 - Taiki Twinkle
- 2002 - Chocot
- 2003 - Chunyi
- 2004 - Winglet
- 2005 - Meine Sorcerous
- 2006 - Cosmo Marvelous
- 2007 - Cosmo Marvelous
- 2008 - Zarema
- 2009 - Wedding Fujiko
- 2010 - Kauai Lane
- 2011 - Meine Princess
- 2012 - Sound of Heart
- 2013 - Lei Carla
- 2014 - Minaret

== See also ==
- Horse racing in Japan
- List of Japanese flat horse races
