= Only For Life =

British-bred Thoroughbred racehorse

Only for Life
- Sire: Chanteur
- Grandsire: Chateau Bouscaut
- Dam: Life Sentence
- Damsire: Court Martial
- Sex: Stallion
- Foaled: 1960
- Country: United Kingdom
- Colour: Bay
- Breeder: Hanstead Stud
- Owner: Monica Sheriffe
- Trainer: Jeremy Tree
- Record: 10:3-3-1

Major wins
- 2000 Guineas (1963); King Edward VII Stakes (1963)

Only for Life (1960–1985) was a British Thoroughbred racehorse and sire. In a career that lasted from September 1962 to summer 1964 he ran ten times and won three races. A horse who was particularly effective on soft ground, Only for Life recorded his most significant victory when he won the 2000 Guineas at Newmarket in 1963 as a 33/1 outsider. His other major win came in June that year in the King Edward VII Stakes at Royal Ascot. He was retired to stud in 1964 and was later exported to Japan where he died in 1985.

== Background ==
Only for Life, originally named Dartmoor Ditty, was a bay horse bred in Hertfordshire, England by the Hanstead Stud. He was sired by the Coronation Cup winner Chanteur out of the mare Life Sentence, a useful sprinter who won races at Newmarket and Manchester. As a yearling he was sent to the sales where he was bought for 1,600 guineas by the trainer Jeremy Tree on behalf of Monica Sheriffe. Tree, who trained at Beckhampton in Wiltshire was reportedly motivated by having briefly owned Life Sentence and winning the Goodwood Cup with her half-brother Double Bore.

== Racing career ==
=== 1962: two-year-old season ===
Only for Life was slow to mature and did not appear until September. On his debut he was not strongly fancied but won the Clarence House Stakes over six furlongs at Ascot. He then finished unplaced in the Houghton Stakes at Newmarket in September.

=== 1963: three-year-old season ===
Only for Life's first appearance as a three-year-old gave little sign that he had Classic potential as he finished a well-beaten third on heavy ground in the Greenham Stakes over seven furlongs at Newbury in April. The ground was soft again at Newmarket for the 2000 Guineas two weeks later, and Only for Life started at odds of 33/1 (almost 100/1 with The Tote) in a field of twenty-one runners, with Crocket being made the 5/2 favourite. Ridden by Jimmy Lindley, Only for Life took the lead two furlongs from the finish but was overtaken by the Irish colt Ionian and appeared to be beaten before staying on again in the closing stages to cross the line apparently level. The judge scrutinised the photograph of the finish for five minutes before announcing Only for Life the winner by a short head. The winning time of 1:45.0 was the slowest since 1937.

Only for Life had never been entered for the Epsom Derby and had his next run at Royal Ascot. He ran in the King Edward VII Stakes (the race formerly known as the Ascot Derby) over one and a half miles and won by two lengths. Over the same course and distance in July he contested Britain's most prestigious weight-for-age race, the King George VI and Queen Elizabeth Stakes. He finished unplaced, beaten more than fifteen lengths by the Irish Derby winner Ragusa. Only for Life met Ragusa again in the Great Voltigeur Stakes at York in August and, racing on his favoured soft ground, produced a much better effort, running the Irish colt to a head after a strongly-contested finish.

By September, the ground was much firmer, but Only for Life started second favourite the St. Leger Stakes at Doncaster, a race that was run amid tight security following a series of doping scandals. He failed to produce his best form in finishing tailed-off behind Ragusa.

=== 1964: four-year-old season ===
Only for Life stayed in training at four and began promisingly with a second place to Royal Avenue in the John Porter Stakes at Newbury in April. He made only one other appearance that year however, finishing second in the Paradise Stakes at Ascot before being retired from racing.

== Assessment ==
In their book, A Century of Champions, based on the Timeform rating system, John Randall and Tony Morris rated Only for Life an "inferior" winner of the 2000 Guineas.

== Stud career ==
Only for Life was retired to stand at stud in Ireland. After two seasons he was sold and exported to Japan, where he remained until his death on 13 May 1985. Before he left Europe he sired The Elk, who was trained by Jeremy Tree for Monica Sheriffe to win the Observer Gold Cup in 1968, and the filly State Pension who finished second in The Oaks. Probably the best of his Japanese progeny was Ichifuji Isami who won the spring Tenno Sho in 1975.

== Pedigree ==
Pedigree of Only for Life (GB), bay stallion, 1960
Sire Chanteur (FR) 1942	Chateau Bouscaut; 1927	Kirkcubbin	Captivation
Sire Chanteur (FR) 1942	Chateau Bouscaut; 1927	Kirkcubbin	Avon Hack
Sire Chanteur (FR) 1942	Chateau Bouscaut; 1927	Ramondie	Neil Gow
Sire Chanteur (FR) 1942	Chateau Bouscaut; 1927	Ramondie	La Rille
Sire Chanteur (FR) 1942	La Diva; 1937	Blue Skies	Blandford*
Sire Chanteur (FR) 1942	La Diva; 1937	Blue Skies	Blue Pill
Sire Chanteur (FR) 1942	La Diva; 1937	La Traviata	Alcantara
Sire Chanteur (FR) 1942	La Diva; 1937	La Traviata	Tregaron
Dam Life Sentence (GB) 1949	Court Martial; 1942	Fair Trial	Fairway
Dam Life Sentence (GB) 1949	Court Martial; 1942	Fair Trial	Lady Juror
Dam Life Sentence (GB) 1949	Court Martial; 1942	Instantaneous	Hurry On
Dam Life Sentence (GB) 1949	Court Martial; 1942	Instantaneous	Picture
Dam Life Sentence (GB) 1949	Borobella; 1942	Bois Roussel	Vatout
Dam Life Sentence (GB) 1949	Borobella; 1942	Bois Roussel	Plucky Liege
Dam Life Sentence (GB) 1949	Borobella; 1942	Annabel	Blandford*
Dam Life Sentence (GB) 1949	Borobella; 1942	Annabel	Arabella (Family:14-c)

- Only for Life was inbred 4 × 4 to Blandford, meaning that this stallion appears twice in the fourth generation of his pedigree.
