= Agnes Tachyon =

Japanese Thoroughbred racehorse

Agnes Tachyon アグネスタキオン
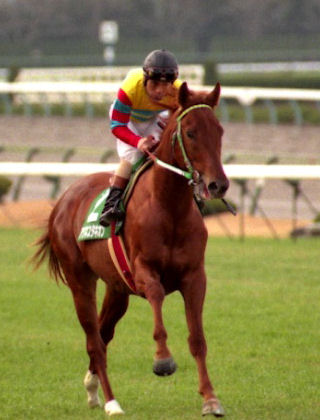
- Agnes Tachyon in the Radio Tampa Cup 3-year-old Stakes in December 2000.
- Breed: Thoroughbred
- Sire: Sunday Silence (USA)
- Grandsire: Halo (USA)
- Dam: Agnes Flora (JPN)
- Damsire: Royal Ski (USA)
- Sex: Stallion
- Foaled: 13 April 1998
- Died: 22 June 2009 (aged 11)
- Country: Japan
- Colour: Chestnut
- Breeder: Takao Watanabe
- Owner: Takao Watanabe
- Racing colours
- Trainer: Hiroyuki Nagahama
- Jockey: Hiroshi Kawachi
- Record: 4: 4–0–0
- Earnings: ¥222,082,000

Major wins
- Radio Tampa Hai Sansai Stakes (2000); Yayoi Sho (2001); Japanese Classic Race wins: Satsuki Shō (2001)

Awards
- Leading sire in Japan (2008)

Agnes Tachyon (Japanese: アグネスタキオン, Hepburn: Agunesu Takion; 13 April 1998 – 22 June 2009) was a Japanese Thoroughbred racehorse and a leading sire in Japan. His major wins include the Satsuki Shō, and the Yayoi Sho. He ran undefeated from 2000 until 2001, and was widely anticipated to win the year's Classic Triple Crown. However shortly after winning the Satsuki Shō, a bowed tendon suddenly ended his racing career, leading to newspapers referring to him as a 'phantom' Triple Crown winner.

After retiring from racing, Agnes Tachyon had a successful stud career, siring many graded stakes-winning horses. He was named 2008's leading sire in Japan, ending his sire Sunday Silence's twelve-year streak as Japan's leading sire.

== Background ==
Agnes Tachyon was sired by Sunday Silence and his dam Agnes Flora (by Royal Ski); Agnes Flora won the Oka Sho, and his granddam, Agnes Lady, won the Yushun Himba (Japanese Oaks), while Sunday Silence had won the 1989 Kentucky Derby and Preakness Stakes, and was Japan's leading sire from 1995 to 2007. Agnes Tachyon was the younger brother of the 2000 Tōkyō Yūshun winner Agnes Flight.The name "Tachyon" is derived from tachyonic particles, hypothetical particles which travel faster than the speed of light.

Agnes Flora had mated with Sunday Silence several times before Agnes Tachyon's birth, with their first time occurring in Agnes Flora's first year as a broodmare, 1992. At the time, Sunday Silence had not yet sired any runners at Shadai, as it was his second year season as a stallion. In the following year, 1993, their first foal was born, a colt. As successful horses from Sunday Silence had begun gaining popularity, this first foal was named "Agnes Takao", using Watanabe Takao's name. Agnes Takao was entrusted to trainer Mitsumasa Hamada, but he could not perform as expected due to inherited leg weaknesses from his mother. After mating twice with Tony Bin, Sunday Silence was once again chosen as Agnes Flora's mating partner in 1996, resulting in Agnes Flight being born on 2 March 1997 at Shadai Farm. Agnes Flora and Sunday Silence were paired again later the same year, leading to Agnes Tachyon's birth in 1998.

== Racing career ==
=== 2000: 2-year-old season ===
He made his debut relatively late, in a maiden race over 2,000 meters on the turf at Hanshin Racecourse in December 2000. Although he attracted much attention, being the full brother of Agnes Flight, his training times were not particularly impressive, so he was only the third favorite. However, in the race, he recorded a final three-furlong split in a 33-second range, winning by a commanding three-and-a-half-lengths margin over the runner-up, Libroadcast. The favorite, Born King, finished fifth.

In the subsequent Radio Tampa Hai Sansai Stakes for 3-Year-Olds (now the Hopeful Stakes), the competition was even tougher, but he went on to win, setting a record time for a 2-year-old over 2,000m. Jungle Pocket finished second by two and a half lengths, and Kurofune came in third—a high-level contest in which future G1 winners took the top three spots. Despite adopting a strategy known as "early move", or sensing the slow pace, he began to surge as early as the third turn, and was neck-and-neck for the lead by the fourth turn. He recorded the fastest final three furlongs of any horse in the field, at 34.1 seconds. After the race, jockey Kawachi was recorded saying, "I'm convinced this horse is in a league of its own." Trainer Nagahama highly praised Agnes Tachyon's performance, stating, "His racing style is better than his older brother's."

In the selection for Best 2-Year-Old Colt, a press vote where the winner of the Asahi Hai Stakes had historically been chosen, Agnes Tachyon garnered an exceptional 119 votes. However, was defeated by Asahi Hai winner Mejiro Bailey, who received 147 votes.

=== 2001: 3-year-old season ===
Agnes Tachyon's owner had described him as having the potential to win the Triple Crown, and so he was entered into the Yayoi Sho, a major trial race for the Satsuki Sho, since both races are run over the same distance. On a heavy track, he won by five lengths over the second-place finisher, Born King, while the future Kikuka-shō winner, Manhattan Cafe, finished fourth.

Having performed so well in the qualifier race, and with Agnes Gold (who had been considered a top contender alongside Agnes Tachyon) withdrawn due to injury, he entered the Satsuki Sho as the overwhelming favorite. He started the race with a win-only betting support rate of 59.4%, the second-highest in history at the time. He won the race by easily kicking off in the final spurt from a good mid-pack position, in fourth or fifth place.

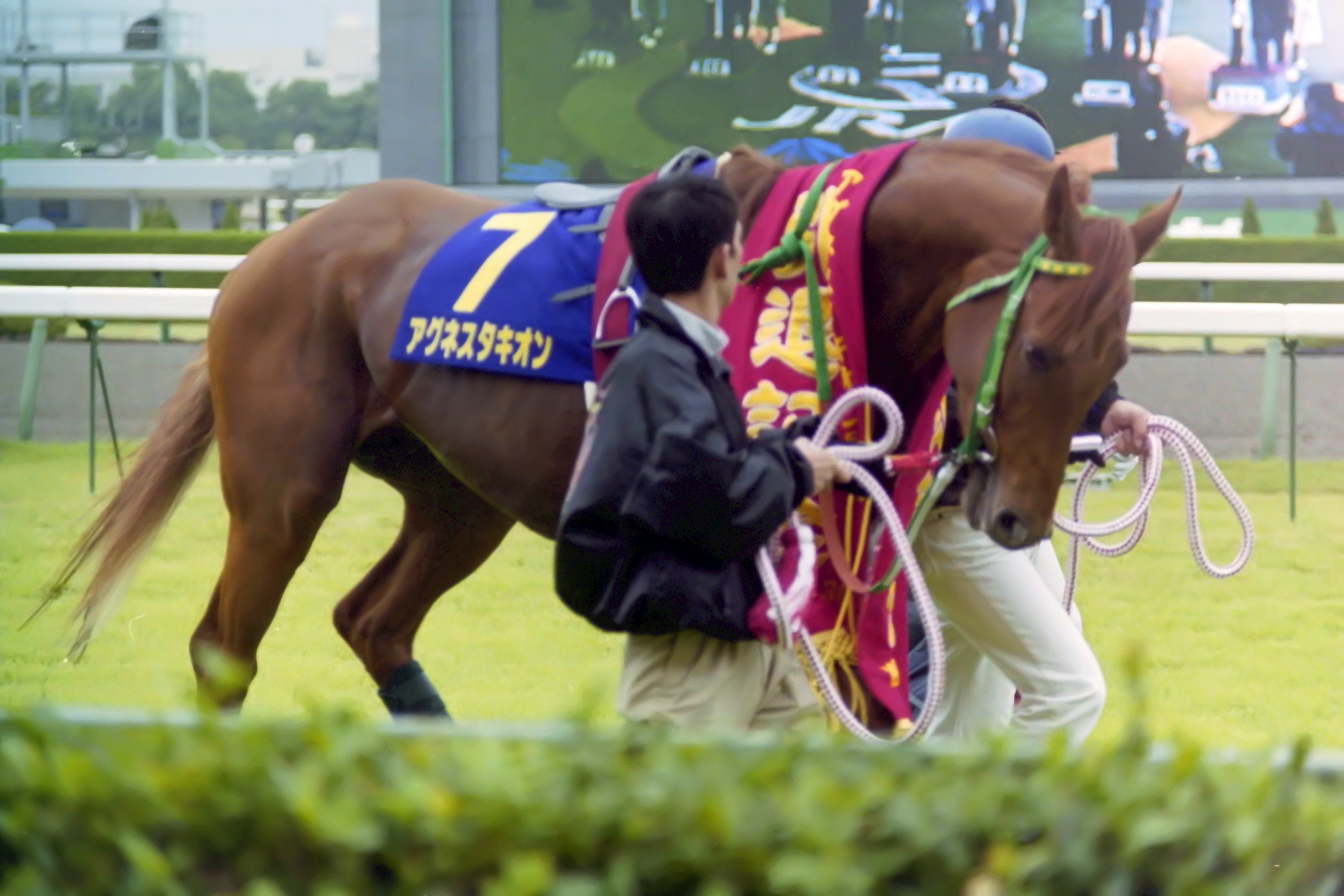
Agnes Tachyon at his retirement ceremony

With this, he had won all four of his highly competitive races, and, since each victory had been achieved without any real threat, expectations were high for him to win the Triple Crown. However, on 2 May, he developed superficial flexor tendonitis in his left front leg and had to withdraw from the Japanese Derby. Nagahama, who had expressed concern even while celebrating his Satsuki Sho victory, saying, "I'm happy, but I'm worried he might end up like Agnes Gold (who fractured his leg)" saw his fears become a reality.

He was subsequently sent to Shadai Farm for pasture rest, and following discussions among his trainer and owner, the decision was made to retire him. His retirement was announced to the public on 29 August. A retirement ceremony was held at Hanshin Racecourse on 30 September.

== Stud record ==
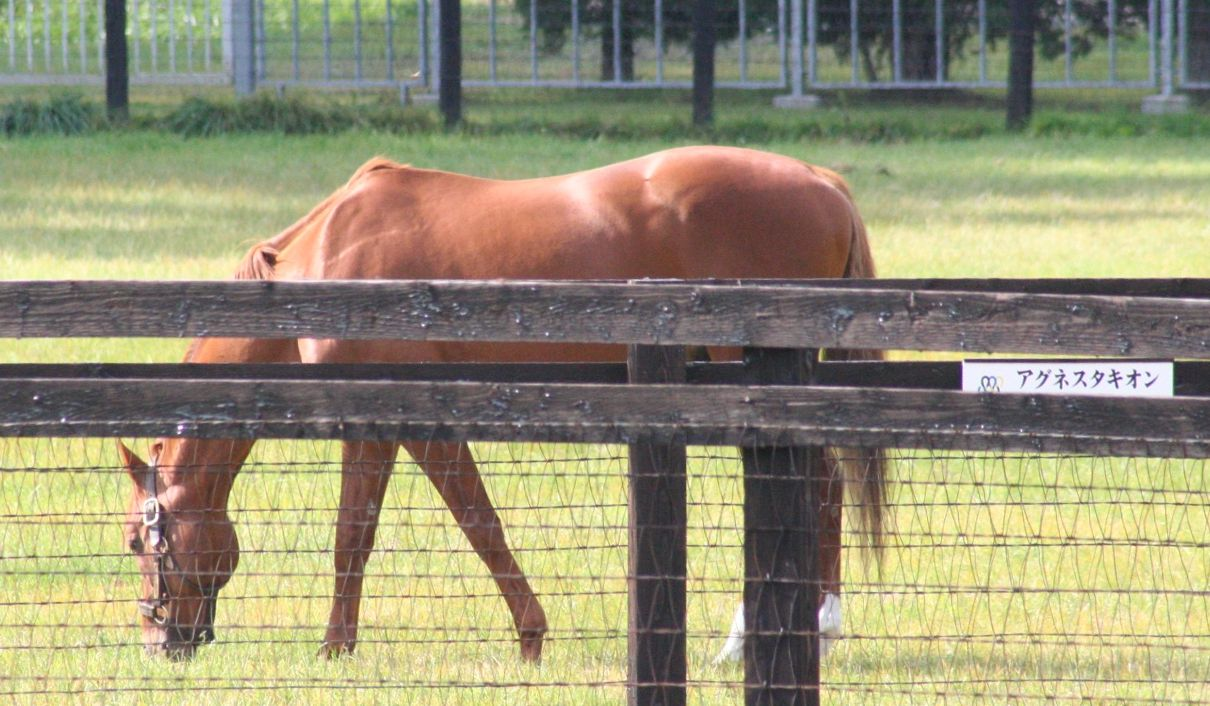
Agnes Tachyon at the Shadai Stallion Station in 2008

Agnes Tachyon was assigned to the stud duty at Shadai Stallion Station. By 2008, he had produced many great foals, such as Daiwa Scarlet and Deep Sky. He was awarded as the leading sire in Japan that same year. He died the year after from heart failure, at the age of eleven years old.

=== Notable progeny ===
c = colt, f = filly, g = gelding
bold = grade 1 stakes

Grade One winners
Foaled	Name	Sex	Major Wins
2003	Logic	c	**NHK Mile Cup**
2004	Daiwa Scarlet	f	**Oka Sho**, **Shūka Sho**, **Queen Elizabeth II Cup**, Osaka Hai, **Arima Kinen**
2005	Captain Thule	c	**Satsuki Shō**, Daily Hai Nisai Stakes, Asahi Challenge Cup
2005	Deep Sky	c	**Tokyo Yūshun**, **NHK Mile Cup**
2005	Little Amapola	f	**Queen Elizabeth II Cup**, Queen Cup, Aichi Hai
2008	Reve d'Essor	f	Daily Hai Nisai Stakes, **Hanshin Juvenile Fillies**, Tulip Sho

Other winners
Foaled	Name	Sex	Major Wins
2003	Lanzarote	c	Procyon Stakes
2003	Shonan Tachyon	c	Niigata Nisai Stakes
2004	Admire Aura	c	Yayoi Sho, Kyōto Kinen, Shinzan Kinen
2004	Meine Canna	f	Fukushima Himba Stakes
2004	Shonan Talent	f	Flower Cup
2005	Admire Commando	g	Aoba Sho
2005	Copano Jingu	c	Meguro Kinen
2005	Daiwa Wild Boar	c	St Lite Kinen
2005	Rainbow Pegasus	c	Kisaragi Sho, Sekiya Kinen
2006	Broad Street	f	Rose Stakes
2006	Germinal	f	Fairy Stakes
2006	Hikaru Amaranthus	f	Kyoto Himba Stakes
2006	I Am Kamino Mago	f	Hanshin Himba Stakes
2007	Quark Star	c	St Lite Kinen
2007	Ridill	c	Swan Stakes, Daily Hai Nisai Stakes
2007	Sunrise Prince	c	New Zealand Trophy
2008	I Am Actress	f	Unicorn Stakes
2008	Northern River	c	Sakitama Hai, Arlington Cup, Capella Stakes
2008	Red Davis	g	Shinzan Kinen, Mainichi Hai, Naruo Kinen
2009	Grandezza	c	Spring Stakes, Tanabata Sho, Sapporo Nisai Stakes
2009	Omega Heartland	f	Flower Cup
2009	Osumi Ichiban	c	Diolite Kinen, Hyogo Championship
2009	Red Claudia	f	Queen Sho
2009	Sound of Heart	f	Hanshin Himba Stakes
2010	Jebel Musa	c	Elm Stakes
2010	Red Arion	g	Yomiuri Milers Cup, Sekiya Kinen

== In popular culture ==
An anthropomorphized version of Agnes Tachyon appears as a character in the Japanese multimedia franchise Umamusume: Pretty Derby, voiced by Sumire Uesaka. She is depicted as a mad scientist obsessed with pushing the physical limits of Umamusume, with her implied motive being that she wishes to overcome the limitations of her fragile legs using scientific methods. She has a preference for sugary tea, and is obsessed with her research to the point of rarely leaving the laboratory she shares with her friendly rival Manhattan Cafe, who she often pesters to be her "guinea pig" in her experiments. A film featuring Agnes Tachyon named Umamusume: Pretty Derby – Beginning of a New Era depicts her real-life counterpart's racing career and was released in Japan on 24 May 2024.

== Racing form ==
Agnes Tachyon won four races out of four starts. This data is available on JBIS and netkeiba. He raced on turf track in all of his races.

Date	Age	Racecourse	Race	Grade	Distance (Condition)	Entry	HN	Odds (Favored)	Finish	Time	Margins	Jockey	Runner-up
2 December 2000	2	Hanshin	2YO Newcomer		2,000 m (Firm)	10	4	5.8 (3)	1st	2:04.3	–0.6	Hiroshi Kawachi	Rebroadcast
23 December 2000	2	Hanshin	Radio Tampa Hai Sansai Stakes	G3	2,000 m (Firm)	12	2	4.5 (2)	1st	R2:00.8	–0.4	Hiroshi Kawachi	Jungle Pocket
4 March 2001	3	Nakayama	Hochi Hai Yayoi Sho	G2	2,000 m (Heavy)	8	1	1.2 (1)	1st	2:05.7	–0.8	Hiroshi Kawachi	Born King
15 April 2001	3	Nakayama	Satsuki Sho	G1	2,000 m (Firm)	18	7	1.3 (1)	1st	2:00.3	–0.2	Hiroshi Kawachi	Dantsu Flame

- R indicated that it was a record time finish

== Pedigree ==
Pedigree of Agnes Tachyon (JPN), chestnut stallion, 1998
Sire Sunday Silence (USA) 1986	Halo (USA); 1969	Hail to Reason; 1958	Turn-to
Sire Sunday Silence (USA) 1986	Halo (USA); 1969	Hail to Reason; 1958	Nothirdchance
Sire Sunday Silence (USA) 1986	Halo (USA); 1969	Cosmah; 1953	Cosmic Bomb
Sire Sunday Silence (USA) 1986	Halo (USA); 1969	Cosmah; 1953	Almahmoud
Sire Sunday Silence (USA) 1986	Wishing Well; 1975	Understanding; 1963	Promised Land
Sire Sunday Silence (USA) 1986	Wishing Well; 1975	Understanding; 1963	Pretty Ways
Sire Sunday Silence (USA) 1986	Wishing Well; 1975	Mountain Flower; 1964	Montparnasse
Sire Sunday Silence (USA) 1986	Wishing Well; 1975	Mountain Flower; 1964	Edelweiss
Dam Agnes Flora (JPN) 1987	Royal Ski; 1974	Raja Baba; 1968	Bold Ruler
Dam Agnes Flora (JPN) 1987	Royal Ski; 1974	Raja Baba; 1968	Missy Baba
Dam Agnes Flora (JPN) 1987	Royal Ski; 1974	Coz o'Nijinsky; 1969	Involvement
Dam Agnes Flora (JPN) 1987	Royal Ski; 1974	Coz o'Nijinsky; 1969	Gleam
Dam Agnes Flora (JPN) 1987	Agnes Lady (JPN); 1976	Remand; 1965	Alcide
Dam Agnes Flora (JPN) 1987	Agnes Lady (JPN); 1976	Remand; 1965	Admonish
Dam Agnes Flora (JPN) 1987	Agnes Lady (JPN); 1976	Ikoma Eikan (JPN); 1967	Sallymount
Dam Agnes Flora (JPN) 1987	Agnes Lady (JPN); 1976	Ikoma Eikan (JPN); 1967	Heatherlands (GB) (Family: 1-l)

== See also ==
- Fuji Kiseki – 1994 Asahi Hai Sansai Stakes winner; shared a similar undefeated career in 4 starts and retiring after a leg injury.
- List of leading Thoroughbred racehorses
