= Reve d'Essor =

Japanese Thoroughbred racehorse

Reve d'Essor; レーヴディソール
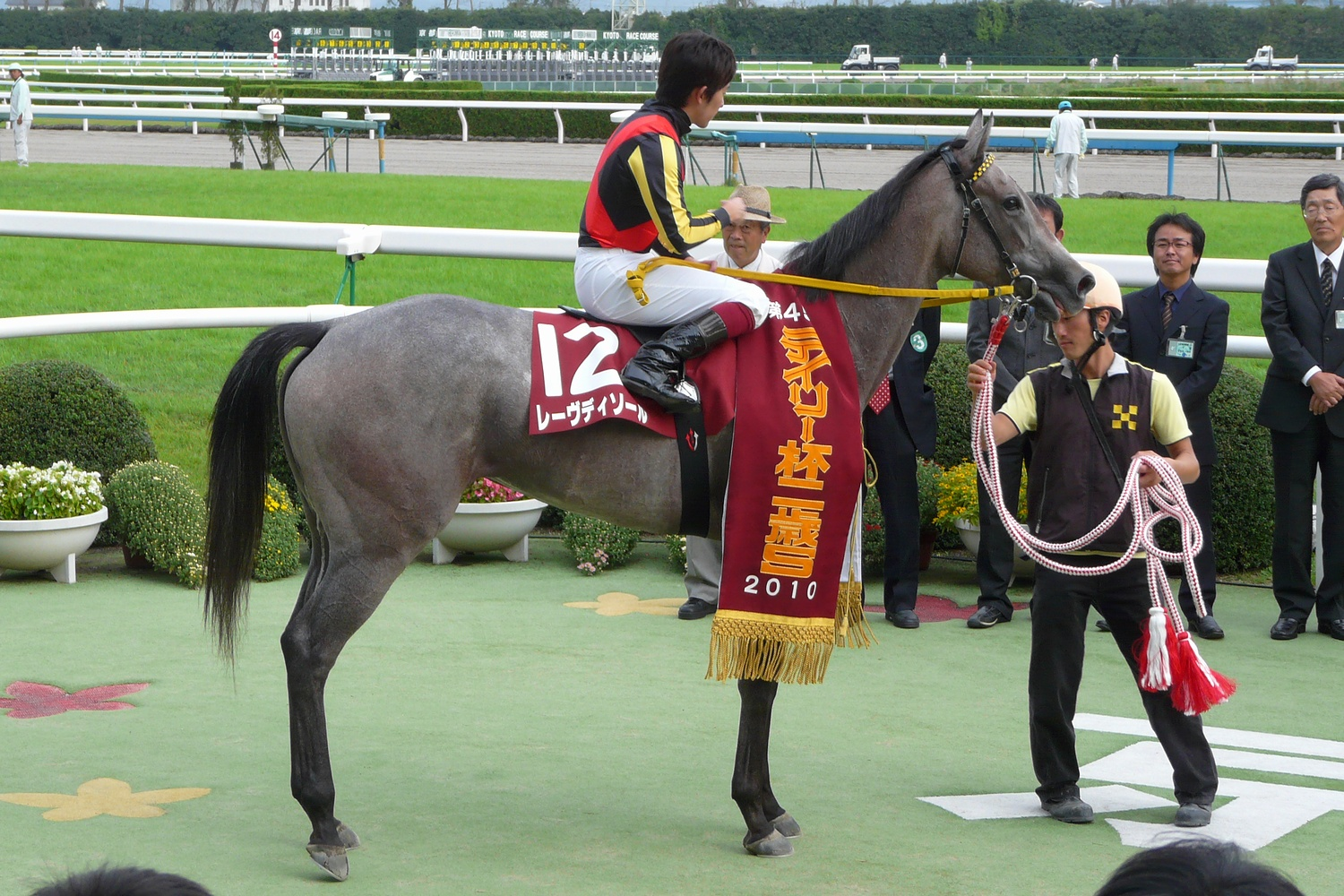
- Reve d'Essor in 2010
- Sire: Agnes Tachyon
- Grandsire: Sunday Silence
- Dam: Reve d'Oscar
- Damsire: Highest Honor
- Sex: Mare
- Foaled: 8 April 2008
- Country: Japan
- Colour: Grey
- Breeder: Northern Farm
- Owner: Sunday Racing
- Racing colours
- Trainer: Hiroyoshi Matsuda
- Jockey: Yuichi Fukunaga
- Record: 6: 4-0-0
- Earnings: 154,933,000 JPY

Major wins
- Daily Hai Nisai Stakes (2010); Hanshin Juvenile Fillies (2010); Tulip Sho (2011)

Awards
- JRA Award for Best Two-Year-Old Filly (2010)

Reve d'Essor (Japanese レーヴディソール, foaled 8 April 2008) is a Japanese Thoroughbred racehorse and broodmare. She was the best juvenile filly in Japan in 2010 when she was unbeaten in three races including the Daily Hai Nisai Stakes and Hanshin Juvenile Fillies. She won the Tulip Sho on her three-year-old debut before her career was disrupted by injury. She failed to recapture her best form in two subsequent races and was retired from racing at the end of the year.

== Background ==
Reve d'Essor is a grey mare bred in Hokkaido by Northern Farm. During her racing career she carried the black, yellow, pink and red colours of Sunday Racing and was trained by Hiroyoshi Matsuda. She was ridden in all of her races by Yuichi Fukunaga.

She was from the seventh crop of foals sired by the undefeated Agnes Tachyon who won the Satsuki Sho in 2001. He went on to become a successful breeding stallion whose other foals included Deep Sky, Daiwa Scarlet, Logic (NHK Mile Cup), Captain Thule (Satsuki Sho) and Little Amapola (Queen Elizabeth II Commemorative Cup).

Reve d'Essor's dam Reve d'Oscar showed top class form in Europe, winning the Prix Saint-Alary in 2000. After being exported to Japan she became a successful broodmare whose other foals included the Aoba Sho winner Reve Mistral. She was a full-sister to Reve d'Iman, the dam of Bethrah.

== Racing career ==
=== 2010: two-year-old season ===
Reve d'Essor began her racing career in a 1500 metre contest for previously unraced juveniles at Sapporo Racecourse on 11 September. She started favourite against thirteen opponents and won from Northern River, a colt who went on to win the Arlington Cup and the Capella Stakes. On 16 October at Kyoto Racecourse the filly was stepped up in class for the Grade 2 Daily Hai Nisai Stakes over 1600 metres and went off the 1.4/1 favourite in a twelve-runner field. She was only eighth on the final turn but finished strongly to win by one and a quarter lengths and a length from the colts Admire Sagace and Meisho Naruto. Grand Prix Boss who was voted Japan's champion two-year-old colt, finished seventh. She became the first filly to win the race since Seeking The Pearl in 1996.

Reve d'Essor made her first appearance in all-female competition on 12 December when she contested the Grade 1 Hanshin Juvenile Fillies over 1600 metres at Hanshin Racecourse. She was made the 0.6/1 favourite against seventeen opponents including Dance Fantasia (unbeaten in two races), Aventura, Whale Capture, Meine Isabel (Niigata Nisai Stakes) and Marumo Sarah (Fairy Stakes). As in her previous starts, Reve d'Essor came from well off the pace with a strong late run (described as an "explosive charge") and won by a length from Whale Capture.

In the official ratings for Japanese two-year-olds Reve d'Essor was rated the best juvenile filly of the year, two pounds ahead of Whale Capture and four pounds below the top-rated colt Grand Prix Boss. In January 2011 Reve d'Essor was unanimously awarded the JRA Award for Best Two-Year-Old Filly at the JRA Awards for 2010, receiving all 285 of the votes.

=== 2011: three-year-old season ===
On 5 March at Hanshin, Reve d'Essor made her debut in the 1600 metres Tulip Sho, a race which serves as a trial for the Oka Sho, which is run in early April and is the traditional start to the annual classic races for three-year-olds in Japan. Starting at odds of 1/10 she was restrained as usual in the early stages before taking the lead in the straight and drawing away to win easily by four lengths from Rice Terrace. Later that month the filly sustained a leg injury in training and was off the track until autumn.

After an absence of six months, Reve d'Essor returned at Kyoto in November to contest the Queen Elizabeth II Commemorative Cup, a race which saw her pitted against older fillies and mares for the first time. She started the 6.3/1 third favourite but never looked likely to win and suffered her first defeat as she came home eleventh of the eighteen runners, almost nine lengths behind the winner Snow Fairy. On 18 December Reve d'Essor was made odds-on favourite for the Aichi Hai over 2000 metres at Kokura Racecourse, but finished fourth behind Fumino Imagine. She was planned to race in the Kyoto Kinen but withdrew due to the right hind hock injury. This injury later got worse as the diagnosis found that she had an avulsion fracture on her front leg. These two simultaneous injury pushed forward for her immediate retirement and she would assigned as a broodmare at the Northern Farm.

In the Japanese rankings for 2011, Reve d'Essor was rated the second best three-year-old filly, four pounds behind Aventura.

== Racing form ==
Reve d'Essor won four races in six starts. This data is available in JBIS and netkeiba.

Date	Track	Race	Grade	Distance (Condition)	Entry	HN	Odds (Favored)	Finish	Time	Margins	Jockey	Winner (Runner-up)
2010 – two-year-old season
Sep 11	Sapporo	2yo Newcomer		1,500 m (Firm)	14	1	1.4 (1)	1st	1:32.3	–0.2	Eiji Nakadate	(Northern River)
Oct 16	Kyoto	Daily Hai Nisai Stakes	2	1,600 m (Firm)	12	12	2.4 (1)	1st	1:33.6	–0.2	Yuichi Fukunaga	(Admire Sagase)
Dec 12	Hanshin	Hanshin Juvenile Fillies	1	1,600 m (Firm)	18	11	1.6 (1)	1st	1:35.7	–0.1	Yuichi Fukunaga	(Whale Capture)
2011 – three-year-old season
Mar 5	Hanshin	Tulip Sho	3	1,600 m (Firm)	12	8	1.1 (1)	1st	1:34.5	–0.7	Yuichi Fukunaga	(Rice Terrace)
Nov 13	Kyoto	Queen Elizabeth II Cup	1	2,200 m (Firm)	18	8	7.3 (3)	11th	2:12.9	1.3	Yuichi Fukunaga	Snow Fairy
Dec 18	Kokura	Aichi Hai	3	2,000 m (Firm)	16	13	1.7 (1)	4th	1:59.7	0.3	Yuichi Fukunaga	Fumino Imagine

Legend:
Turf

== Breeding record ==
After her retirement from racing, Reve d'Essor became a broodmare. As of 2026, she had produced ten foals:

- Alabaster, a grey colt, foaled in 2013, sired by Harbinger. Won one race.
- Reve de la Mere, grey filly, 2016, by Lord Kanaloa. Failed to win in two races.
- Reve du Roi, bay gelding, 2017, by King Kamehameha. Did not win any races.
- Reve du Monde, bay filly, 2018, by King Kamehameha. Did not win any races.
- Reve de Noel, 2019, gray filly, by Lord Kanaloa. Did not win any races.
- Riazor, 2021, bay filly, by Lord Kanaloa. Did not win any races.
- Unnamed bay colt, 2022, by Harbinger. Unraced.
- Spe Luce, 2023, gray colt, by Rey de Oro. Two win in seven races. Active.
- Eclat de Leon, 2024, bay colt, by Leontes. One win in one race. Active.
- Unnamed bay filly, 2025, by Schnell Meister. Unraced

== Pedigree ==
Pedigree of Reve d'Essor (JPN), grey mare 2008
Sire Agnes Tachyon (JPN) 1998	Sunday Silence (USA); 1986	Halo	Hail to Reason
Sire Agnes Tachyon (JPN) 1998	Sunday Silence (USA); 1986	Halo	Cosmah
Sire Agnes Tachyon (JPN) 1998	Sunday Silence (USA); 1986	Wishing Well	Understanding
Sire Agnes Tachyon (JPN) 1998	Sunday Silence (USA); 1986	Wishing Well	Mountain Flower
Sire Agnes Tachyon (JPN) 1998	Agnes Flora (JPN); 1987	Royal Ski (USA)	Raja Baba
Sire Agnes Tachyon (JPN) 1998	Agnes Flora (JPN); 1987	Royal Ski (USA)	Coz O'Nijinsky
Sire Agnes Tachyon (JPN) 1998	Agnes Flora (JPN); 1987	Agnes Lady	Remand (GB)
Sire Agnes Tachyon (JPN) 1998	Agnes Flora (JPN); 1987	Agnes Lady	Ikoma Eikan
Dam Reve d'Oscar (FR) 1997	Highest Honor (FR); 1983	Kenmare	Kalamoun (GB)
Dam Reve d'Oscar (FR) 1997	Highest Honor (FR); 1983	Kenmare	Belle of Ireland (GB)
Dam Reve d'Oscar (FR) 1997	Highest Honor (FR); 1983	High River	Riverman (USA)
Dam Reve d'Oscar (FR) 1997	Highest Honor (FR); 1983	High River	Hairbrush (USA)
Dam Reve d'Oscar (FR) 1997	Numidie (FR); 1988	Baillamont (USA)	Blushing Groom (FR)
Dam Reve d'Oscar (FR) 1997	Numidie (FR); 1988	Baillamont (USA)	Lodeve (GB)
Dam Reve d'Oscar (FR) 1997	Numidie (FR); 1988	Yamuna	Green Dancer (USA)
Dam Reve d'Oscar (FR) 1997	Numidie (FR); 1988	Yamuna	Yeovil (Family: 1-p)
