= Northern River =

Northern River may refer to:

- Northern River (horse), a Japanese Thoroughbred racehorse
- Northern River (painting), a 1914–15 painting by Tom Thomson

== See also ==
- Northern Rivers, the most northeasterly region of the Australian state of New South Wales
