= Nanako Fujita =

Japanese jockey (born 1997)

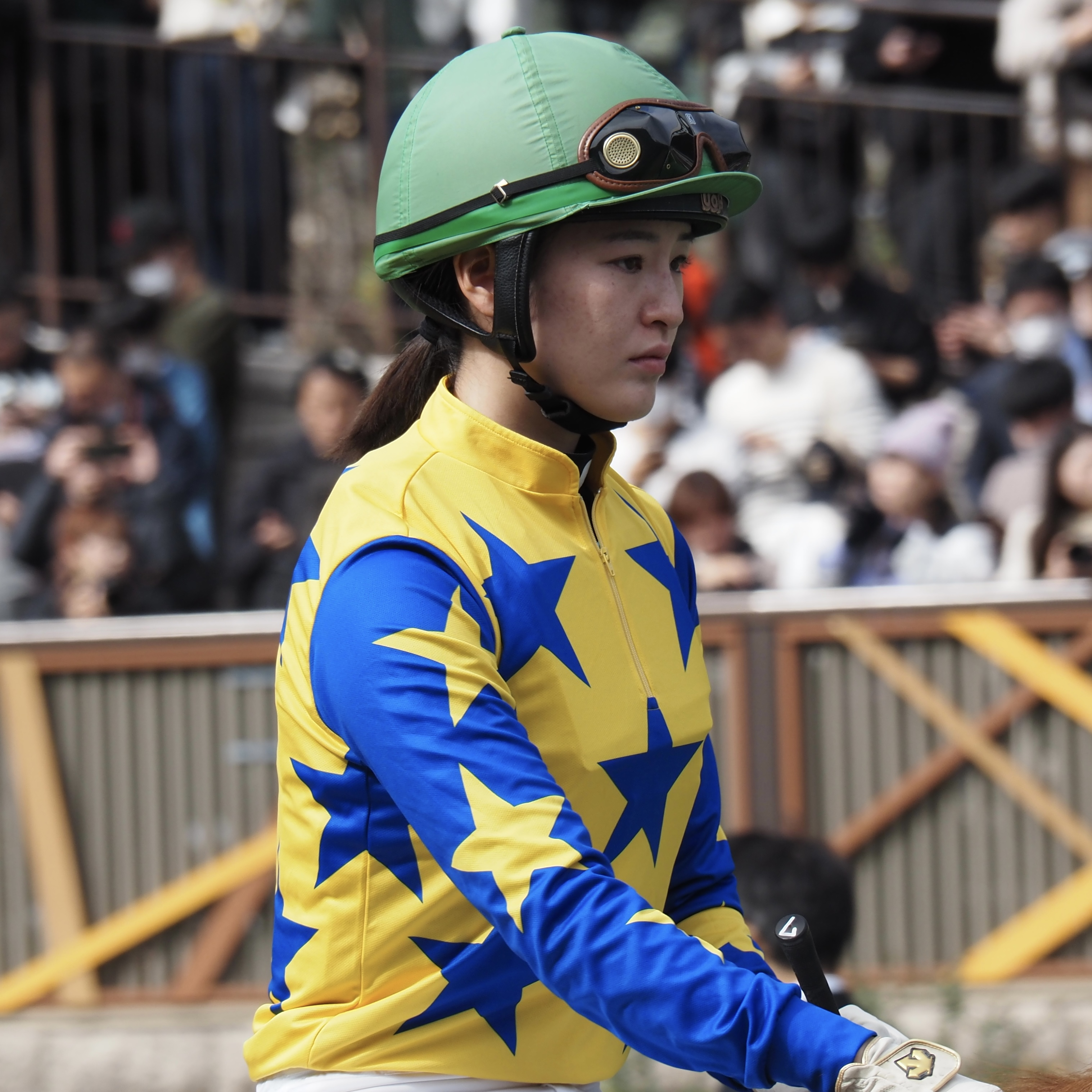
- Fujita in 2024

Personal information
- Native name: 藤田菜七子
- Born: 9 August 1997 (age 29) Moriya, Ibaraki, Japan
- Occupation: Jockey
- Height: 157.4 cm (5 ft 2 in)
- Weight: 45.6 kg (101 lb)

Horse racing career
- Sport: Horse racing
- Career wins: 116 JRA wins

Nanako Fujita (Japanese: 藤田菜七子, romanized: Fujita Nanako; born 9 August 1997) is a retired Japanese jockey. When she earned her jockey license in 2016, she became the first woman to receive a jockey license in Japan in 16 years. Fujita enjoyed a rising career, quickly becoming the country's most successful female jockey. In 2024, she stunned her fan base after retiring from racing suddenly over a controversy regarding phone use.

== Biography ==
Nanako Fujita grew up in Moriya, Ibaraki Prefecture. Her family was not involved in the horse racing industry. After discovering horse racing on television in the sixth grade, Fujita decided to become a jockey. In 2013, Fujita enrolled in jockey school at age 15. She made her racing debut three years later.

=== Racing career ===
When Fujita was granted a jockey's license in 2016, she became the first female jockey to debut in Japan in 16 years. Her appearance made headlines in the Japanese racing scene, as she became the only female jockey racing at the time. She marked her first win on 24 March 2016. That year she participated in the Ladies' World Championship in the United Arab Emirates.

By 2017 she broke the record for the most wins in a season by a Japan Racing Association (JRA) female jockey, with 14 wins. That year, she took part in the 2017 International Mixed Doubles Jockey Challenge in Macau.

In 2018 she set the record for the most career wins by a JRA female jockey when she marked 35 wins.

2019 would become her most successful racing year. In 2019, she became the first JRA female jockey to compete in a Grade 1 stakes race, when competing in the February Stakes. Later that year, she would become the first female jockey to win a Graded race in Japan when she won the Capella Stakes. On 30 June 2019, she won the Women Jockey's World Cup for Japan in Stockholm, Sweden at Bro Park. Later that summer, she travelled to the United Kingdom to race in the Shergar Cup at Ascot Racecourse. She would mark 43 wins that year.

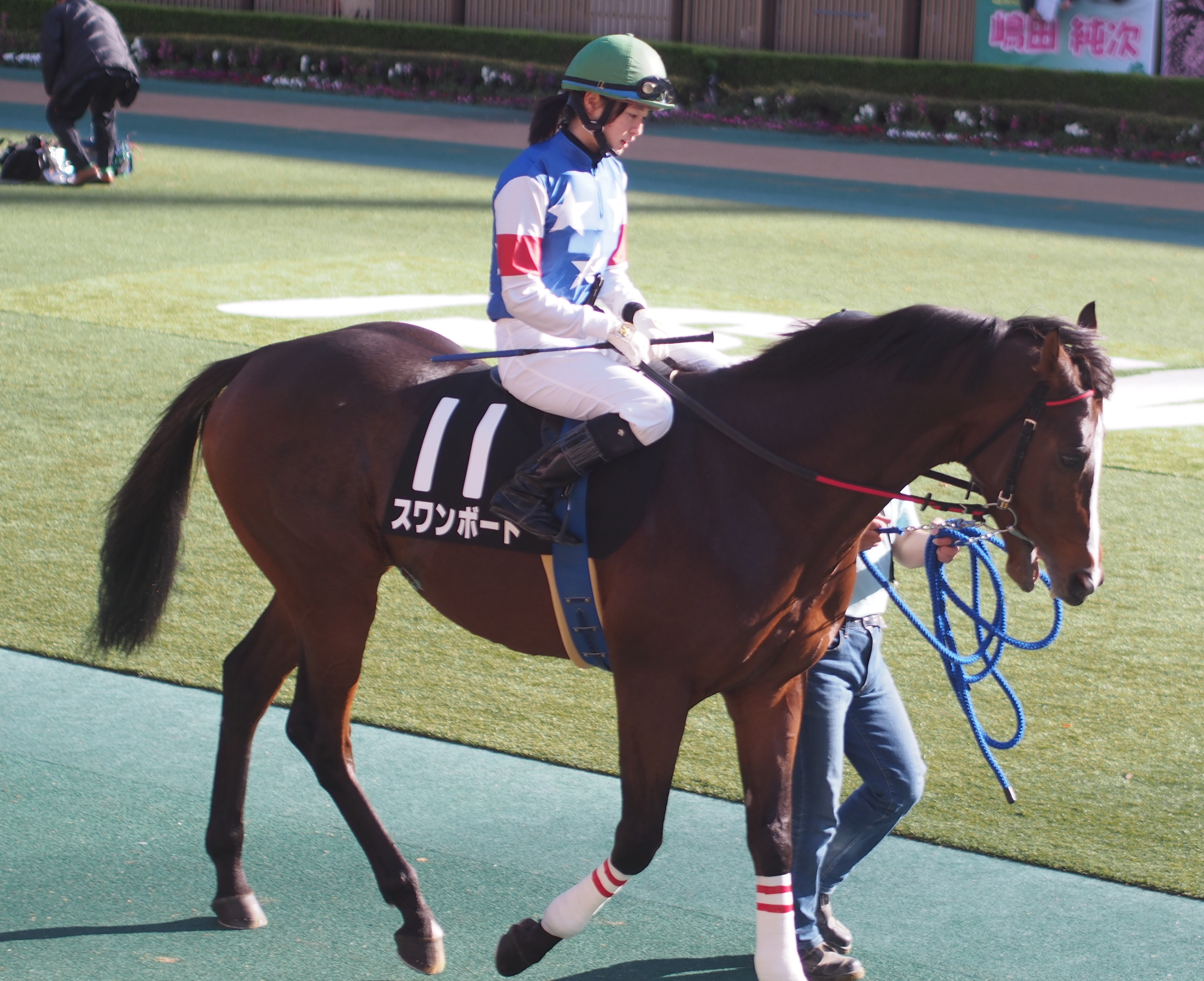
Fujuta pictured in 2017.

In 2021, Fujita took part in the International Jockeys Challenge in Riyadh. She placed fourth in the event. Prior to the 2020 Summer Olympics in Tokyo, Fujita participated in the torch relay.

Fujita's 2024 season would be plagued with injuries. In July, she announced her upcoming marriage to a JRA racing official. On 10 August 2024, Fujita participated in the 2024 Shergar Cup at Ascot. She would mark six wins across the season.

=== Cellphone accusation and retirement ===
On 7 October 2024, Bunshun accused Fujita of breaching mobile phone rules that prohibit jockeys from using cellular phones when they are in lockdown during a racing weekend. JRA rules require jockeys to be sequestered from 9pm on Friday evening until Sunday while participating at race meets. Under the policy commonly deemed "jockey jail", jockeys are not permitted to use their phones during this time for any reason, even to talk to their families. The accusations leveled by Bunshun against Fujita concerned infractions Fujita had previously admitted to the JRA previously the year earlier.

On 10 October 2024, the JRA formally sanctioned Fujita, referring her to an arbitration committee retroactively. The next day, Fujita announced she was quitting the sport, and returned her jockey license.

Upon her retirement, Fujita had 166 JRA winners, more than any female rider in Japan.

In April 2025, Fujita made her first public appearance after her retirement. Appearing at Monbetsu Racecourse, Fujita apologized for "causing you all so much trouble".
