= Dantsu Flame =

Japanese Thoroughbred racehorse (1998–2005)

Dantsu Flame ダンツフレーム
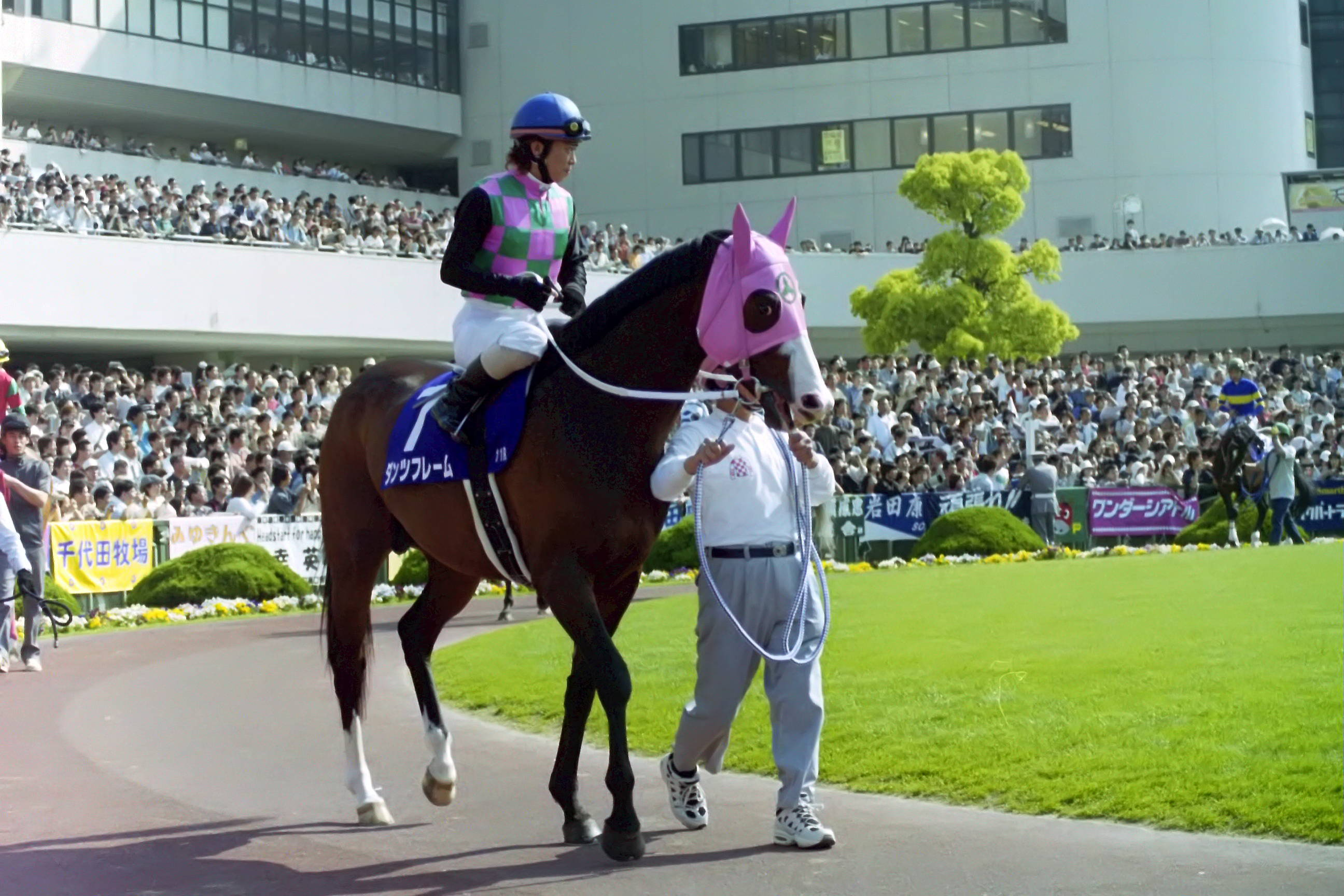
- Dantsu Flame in 2003.
- Breed: Thoroughbred
- Sire: Brian's Time
- Grandsire: Roberto
- Dam: Inter Pyrenees
- Damsire: Sanquirico
- Sex: Stallion
- Foaled: April 19, 1998; Urakawa, Hokkaido
- Died: August 28, 2005 (aged 7); Nasushiobara, Tochigi Prefecture
- Country: Japan
- Colour: Bay
- Breeder: Nobuoka Bokujo
- Owner: Tetsuji Yamamoto
- Racing colours
- Trainer: Kenji Yamauchi; Tokuchi Utsunomiya; Kazuo Okada
- Jockey: Shinji Fujita; Yutaka Take; Hiroshi Kawachi; Kenichi Ikezoe
- Record: 26: 6-6-0
- Earnings: ¥511,428,000

Major wins
- Arlington Cup (2001); Takarazuka Kinen (2002); Niigata Daishoten (2003); Japanese Triple Crown Placements; Satsuki Sho 2nd (2001); Japanese Derby 2nd (2001)

Dantsu Flame (Japanese: ダンツフレーム, Hepburn: Dantsu Fureemu; 19 April 1998 – 28 August 2005) was a Japanese thoroughbred racehorse. He competed from 2000 to 2005, recording six wins in twenty-six starts, including the Takarazuka Kinen in 2002.

== Background ==
Dantsu Flame was a bay horse bred in Urakawa, Hokkaido, by Nobuoka Bokujo. He was sired by Brian's Time, an American-bred stallion who stood in Japan. His dam, Inter Pyrenees, was a daughter of Sanquirico.

In August 1999, he was offered at the Hokkaido Select Sale and purchased for ¥25 million by Tetsuji Yamamoto. He was sent into training with Kenji Yamauchi at the JRA's Ritto Training Center.

== Racing career ==
=== 2000: Two-year-old season ===
Dantsu Flame debuted on June 10, 2000, in a maiden race on the dirt at Hakodate Racecourse, finishing second. He won his next start on July 1 at Hakodate. Transitioning to turf, he won the Kikyo Stakes at Hanshin Racecourse on September 16 and the Nojigiku Stakes on September 30.

=== 2001: Three-year-old season ===
In his first start of 2001, Dantsu Flame finished second in the Kisaragi Sho (GIII) at Kyoto Racecourse. He subsequently won the Arlington Cup (GIII) at Hanshin, defeating Kitasan Channel by a nose.

He contested the Satsuki Sho (GI) in April, finishing second to Agnes Tachyon. In May, he ran in the Tokyo Yushun (Japanese Derby, GI) and finished second to Jungle Pocket. After a summer break, he finished fourth in the Kobe Shimbun Hai (GII) and fifth in the Kikuka Sho (GI). He concluded his three-year-old season by finishing fifth in the Mile Championship (GI).

=== 2002: Four-year-old season ===
Returning in May 2002, Dantsu Flame finished fourth in the Keio Hai Spring Cup (GII). He then contested the Yasuda Kinen (GI) in June, finishing second by a nose to Admire Cozzene.

On June 23, 2002, Dantsu Flame entered the Takarazuka Kinen (GI) at Hanshin. Ridden by Shinji Fujita, he raced in mid-pack before advancing on the final turn. He engaged in a close struggle with Tsurumaru Boy in the final strides, winning by a nose to secure his first GI victory.

In the autumn, he finished fifth in the Mainichi Okan (GII), fourteenth in the Tennō Shō (Autumn) (GI), and seventeenth in the Mile Championship (GI).

=== 2003: Five-year-old season ===
Dantsu Flame began his 2003 campaign by finishing fourth in the Yomiuri Milers Cup (GII) and fifth in the Tennō Shō (Spring) (GI). On May 18, he contested the Niigata Daishoten (GIII) at Niigata Racecourse. Carrying top weight of 59 kg, he won the race by a margin of 0.2 seconds over Toughness Star.

He finished fifth in the Yasuda Kinen and seventh in the Takarazuka Kinen. In September, it was announced that he had developed superficial flexor tendonitis in his right foreleg. He was retired from JRA racing on September 27, 2003.

=== 2004–2005: Regional racing and retirement ===
Initially slated to stand as a breeding stallion, Dantsu Flame's tendonitis healed sufficiently for him to return to competition in the regional NAR circuit. He transferred to the stables of Tokuchi Utsunomiya at Arao Racecourse and later Kazuo Okada at Urawa Racecourse.

He made his NAR debut on October 20, 2004, at Arao, finishing second. He subsequently competed in three dirt graded races: the Urawa Kinen (9th), the Tokyo Daishoten (14th), and the Kawasaki Kinen (11th).

He was officially retired for a second time on June 10, 2005, and sent to the Chiho Keiba Kyoyo Center in Nasushiobara, to be retrained as a riding horse. Shortly after his arrival, he was diagnosed with severe pneumonia. Dantsu Flame died from the illness on August 28, 2005, at the age of 7. A tombstone was erected in his name there, however his grave is currently not open to visits from the public.

== In popular culture ==
An anthropomorphized version of Dantsu Flame appears as a character in the Japanese multimedia franchise Umamusume: Pretty Derby, voiced by Haruna Fukushima. She is depicted as a somewhat naive and kindhearted girl who, despite appearing confident in her abilities, suffers internally from low self-esteem and is often underestimated compared to her stronger classmates, similar to her real-life counterpart. Dantsu Flame has a strong love of dairy products, most notably cheese, referencing her real-life counterpart's dam Inter Pyrenees being named after the cheese Tomme des Pyrénées. She is featured as a supporting character in the spin-off film Umamusume: Pretty Derby – Beginning of a New Era, which was released in Japan on May 24, 2024.

== Statistics ==
The following table details all 26 starts of Dantsu Flame's racing career based on official netkeiba and JBIS records.

Date	Distance (Condition)	Race	Class	Course	Odds (Favourite)	Field	Finish	Time	Winning (Losing) Margin	Winner (2nd Place)	Jockey	Ref
2000 – two-year-old season
Jun 10	Dirt 1000 m (Good)	3-Y-O Newcomer	Maiden	Hakodate	2.5 (1st)	12	2nd	1:01.0	0.7	Meiner Japan	Shinji Fujita	
Jul 1	Dirt 1000 m (Good)	3-Y-O Newcomer	Maiden	Hakodate	1.8 (1st)	8	1st	1:00.9	–0.1	(Tashiro Spring)	Shinji Fujita	
Sep 16	Turf 1400 m (Good)	Kikyo Stakes	Open	Hanshin	1.4 (1st)	10	1st	1:21.9	–0.6	(Homan Miyabi)	Yutaka Take	
Sep 30	Turf 1600 m (Good)	Nojigiku Stakes	Open	Hanshin	1.2 (1st)	9	1st	1:35.4	–0.1	(Linear Muse)	Hiroshi Kawachi	
2001 – three-year-old season
Feb 11	Turf 1800 m (Good)	Kisaragi Sho	GIII	Kyoto	6.5 (3rd)	12	2nd	1:48.0	0.1	Agnes Gold	Yutaka Take	
Feb 24	Turf 1600 m (Good to Soft)	Arlington Cup	GIII	Hanshin	1.2 (1st)	14	1st	1:35.9	–0.0	(Kitasan Channel)	Yutaka Take	
Apr 15	Turf 2000 m (Good)	Satsuki Sho	GI	Nakayama	16.8 (3rd)	18	2nd	2:00.5	0.2	Agnes Tachyon	Shinji Fujita	
May 27	Turf 2400 m (Soft)	Tokyo Yushun	GI	Tokyo	6.1 (3rd)	18	2nd	2:27.2	0.2	Jungle Pocket	Hiroshi Kawachi	
Sep 23	Turf 2000 m (Good)	Kobe Shimbun Hai	GII	Hanshin	6.1 (3rd)	12	4th	1:59.7	0.2	Air Eminem	Yuichi Fukunaga	
Oct 21	Turf 3000 m (Good)	Kikuka Sho	GI	Kyoto	4.2 (2nd)	15	5th	3:07.7	0.5	Manhattan Cafe	Yutaka Take	
Nov 18	Turf 1600 m (Good)	Mile Championship	GI	Kyoto	8.6 (5th)	18	5th	1:33.7	0.5	Zenno El Cid	Yutaka Take	
2002 – four-year-old season
May 12	Turf 1400 m (Good)	Keio Hai Spring Cup	GII	Tokyo	7.8 (4th)	18	4th	1:20.6	0.3	God of Chance	Kenichi Ikezoe	
Jun 2	Turf 1600 m (Good)	Yasuda Kinen	GI	Tokyo	6.2 (2nd)	18	2nd	1:33.3	0.0	Admire Cozzene	Kenichi Ikezoe	
Jun 23	Turf 2200 m (Good)	Takarazuka Kinen	GI	Hanshin	2.4 (1st)	12	1st	2:12.9	–0.0	(Tsurumaru Boy)	Shinji Fujita	
Oct 6	Turf 1800 m (Good)	Mainichi Okan	GII	Nakayama	5.4 (4th)	9	5th	1:46.7	0.6	Magnaten	Shinji Fujita	
Oct 27	Turf 2000 m (Good)	Tenno Sho (Autumn)	GI	Nakayama	15.4 (8th)	18	14th	1:59.6	1.1	Symboli Kris S	Shinji Fujita	
Nov 17	Turf 1600 m (Good)	Mile Championship	GI	Kyoto	19.8 (8th)	18	17th	1:34.0	1.2	Tokai Point	Kenichi Ikezoe	
2003 – five-year-old season
Apr 19	Turf 1600 m (Good)	Yomiuri Milers Cup	GII	Hanshin	18.0 (5th)	13	4th	1:32.4	0.5	Lohengrin	Kenichi Ikezoe	
May 4	Turf 3200 m (Good)	Tenno Sho (Spring)	GI	Kyoto	19.5 (9th)	18	5th	3:17.3	0.3	Hishi Miracle	Shinji Fujita	
May 18	Turf 2000 m (Good)	Niigata Daishoten	GIII	Niigata	3.6 (1st)	16	1st	1:58.3	–0.2	(Toughness Star)	Masaru Honda	
Jun 8	Turf 1600 m (Good)	Yasuda Kinen	GI	Tokyo	5.1 (3rd)	18	5th	1:32.3	0.2	Agnes Digital	Shinji Fujita	
Jun 29	Turf 2200 m (Good)	Takarazuka Kinen	GI	Hanshin	26.0 (7th)	17	7th	2:12.5	0.5	Hishi Miracle	Shinji Fujita	
2004– six-year-old season
Oct 20	Dirt 1500 m (Heavy)	Kannazuki Tokubetsu	Open	Arao	N/A (1st)	10	2nd	1:39.0	1.0	Shigeru Kaminari	Ryuji Yoshida	
Dec 1	Dirt 2000 m (Good)	Urawa Kinen	GII	Urawa	N/A (2nd)	11	9th	2:10.2	3.1	Moere Treasure	Fumio Matoba	
Dec 29	Dirt 2000 m (Soft)	Tokyo Daishoten	GI	Ohi	N/A (9th)	14	14th	2:09.1	6.5	Adjudi Mitsuo	Joji Sawaragi	
2005– seven-year-old season
Jan 26	Dirt 2100 m (Soft)	Kawasaki Kinen	GI	Kawasaki	N/A (8th)	12	11th	2:19.4	5.2	Time Paradox	Joji Sawaragi	

== Pedigree ==
Pedigree of Dantsu Flame (JPN)
Sire Brian's Time 1985	Roberto; 1969	Hail to Reason	Turn-to
Sire Brian's Time 1985	Roberto; 1969	Hail to Reason	Nothirdchance
Sire Brian's Time 1985	Roberto; 1969	Bramalea	Nashua
Sire Brian's Time 1985	Roberto; 1969	Bramalea	Rarelea
Sire Brian's Time 1985	Kelley's Day; 1977	Graustark	Ribot
Sire Brian's Time 1985	Kelley's Day; 1977	Graustark	Flower Bowl
Sire Brian's Time 1985	Kelley's Day; 1977	Golden Trail	Hasty Road
Sire Brian's Time 1985	Kelley's Day; 1977	Golden Trail	Sunny Vale
Dam Inter Pyrenees 1990 F.no: 21-a	Sanquirico; 1985	Lypheor	Lyphard
Dam Inter Pyrenees 1990 F.no: 21-a	Sanquirico; 1985	Lypheor	Klaizia
Dam Inter Pyrenees 1990 F.no: 21-a	Sanquirico; 1985	Nell's Briquette	Lanyon
Dam Inter Pyrenees 1990 F.no: 21-a	Sanquirico; 1985	Nell's Briquette	Double's Nell
Dam Inter Pyrenees 1990 F.no: 21-a	Monte Maria; 1981	Never Beat	Never Say Die
Dam Inter Pyrenees 1990 F.no: 21-a	Monte Maria; 1981	Never Beat	Bride Elect
Dam Inter Pyrenees 1990 F.no: 21-a	Monte Maria; 1981	Kineusu Maria	Romulus
Dam Inter Pyrenees 1990 F.no: 21-a	Monte Maria; 1981	Kineusu Maria	Maria d'Oro

- Dantsu Flame was an inbred by 4 x 5 to Ribot (Romulus's sire), 5 x 5 to Big Game (Bride Elect's and Maria d'Oro's sire) and 5 x 5 to Nasrullah (Nashua's and Never Say Die's sire).

== See also ==
- Thoroughbred racing in Japan
- Takarazuka Kinen
