= Eishin Preston =

American-bred Thoroughbred racehorse

Eishin Preston エイシンプレストン
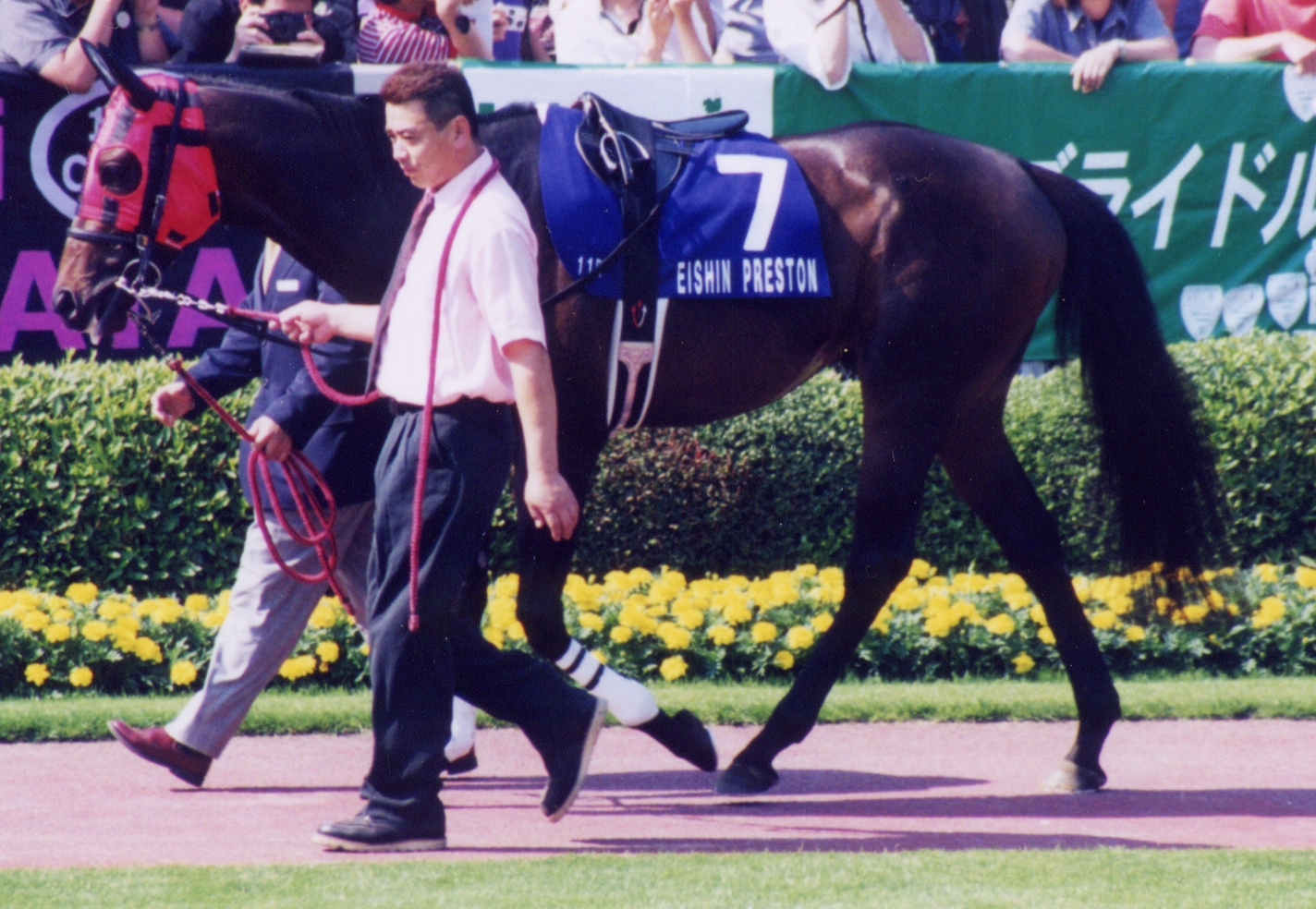
- Eishin Preston in 2001
- Sire: Green Dancer
- Grandsire: Nijinsky
- Dam: Warranty Applied
- Damsire: Monteverdi
- Sex: Stallion
- Foaled: April 9, 1997
- Died: February 2, 2025 (aged 28); Eishin Bokujo
- Country: United States
- Colour: Bay
- Breeder: Joseph E. Gehl
- Owner: Toyomitsu Hirai
- Racing colours
- Trainer: Shuji Kitahashi
- Jockey: Yuichi Fukunaga
- Record: 32: 10-5-2
- Earnings: 491,067,000 JPY + 24,600,000 HKD

Major wins
- Asahi Hai Sansai Stakes (1999); Arlington Cup (2000); New Zealand Trophy (2000); Kitakyushu Kinen (2001); Mainichi Okan (2001); Hong Kong Mile (2001); Queen Elizabeth II Cup (2002 & 2003)

Awards
- JRA Award for Best Two-Year-Old Colt (1999)
- Last updated on May 2, 2025

Eishin Preston (Japanese: エイシンプレストン, Chinese: 栄進寳蹄) ( April 9, 1997 – February 2, 2025) was an American-bred Thoroughbred racehorse who competed in Japan and Hong Kong and later became a breeding stallion.

Sired by Green Dancer, 1991's leading sire in France and a son of English Triple Crown champion, Nijinsky, Eishin Preston's damsire Monteverdi was the son of Lyphard, who, like Nijinsky, was a son of Northern Dancer.

Eishin Preston won important graded stakes races in Japan under trainer Shuji Kitahashi. At Kyoto Racecourse, he was second in the 2001 and 2002 Mile Championship. Sent to compete at Hong Kong's Sha Tin Racecourse, he won the 2001 Hong Kong Mile then came back in 2002 and 2003 to win back-to-back runnings of the Queen Elizabeth II Cup.

== Racing career ==
=== 1999: two-year-old season ===
He started his career in the 1600 m race at the Kyoto Racecourse, where he finished in second place by four lengths behind Daitaku Riva. He won his next race on the same racecourse and same distance before ran in the Asahi Hai Sansai Stakes. At the race, he chased Legend Hunter after cutting through the inside track and reached the line first for his first graded stakes win. At the end of the year, he won the JRA Award for Best Two-Year-Old Colt award.

=== 2000: three-year-old season ===
In this year, he started slow at the Kisaragi Sho with a ninth-place finish but bounce back with two wins on a trot at the Arlington Cup and New Zealand Trophy. He was meant to join the NHK Mile Cup next but a fracture was discovered before the race, which subsided him for the next six months. He came back in the Swan Stakes and Mile Championship in which he finished in sixth and fifth place respective.

=== 2001: four-year-old season ===
For this season, his career split into two different halves. For the first half of the year, Eishin Preston went winless in six races where his best finish would be the second place at the Lord Derby Challenge Trophy, two lengths behind Checkmate. The season switched for the better as he won the Yonago Stakes in June, the Kitakyushu Kinen in July and also the Mainichi Okan in October with a third-place finish in the Sekiya Kinen in August. The next race he aimed for is the Mile Championship. In this race, he ran well in the middle pack. He tried to surge away at the final stint but the slow pace and tight pack blocked his path. He managed to get away through the outside but it was too late to catch the leader, Zenno El Cid who went on to win the race by three quarters of a length over him who scored the second place. He closed the season with a run at the Hong Kong Mile. Although he was the sixth favorite, he made a sharp move from the middle of the pack to win by 0.5 seconds, marking his first overseas G1 victory. This day would be the blessed day for the Japan endeavours as Stay Gold and Agnes Digital also won the Hong Kong Vase and Hong Kong Cup respectively.

=== 2002: five-year-old season ===
Eishin Preston opened his five-year-old season with a fifth-place finish in the Nakayama Kinen. Riding on a high note finish from the last year Hong Kong trip, Eishin Preston ran in the Queen Elizabeth II Cup in April. This time, his main rival would be his compatriot, Agnes Digital who was fresh from his win at the February Stakes. When the gate opened, Eishin Preston calmly start the race and proceeded to laying around the middle pack on eighth position. At the fourth corner, the favourite Grandera accelerated but he was marked well by Agnes Digital. Meanwhile, Eishin Preston transitioned to the outside track and dueled with Agnes Digital to the line in which he won the race just by 0.1 second. After this race, he went six races without a win in which he got a second place in both Mainichi Okan and Mile Championship, losing to Magnaten and Tokai Point respectively. He ended his season with a fifth place at the Hong Kong Cup. His jockey, Yuichi Fukunaga said that he was too casual and optimistic before it begin and that attitude cost them the race.

=== 2003: six-year-old season ===
Eishin Preston attempted a dirt race as this season opener but it did work out as he finished in 16th place with a margin of 6.2 seconds behind the winner, Gold Allure. His next race would be to defend the Queen Elizabeth II Cup in Hong Kong. Despite the overwhelming SARS pandemic at that time, Eishin Preston safely went to Hong Kong. On the race day, Eishin Preston started well and managed to move to the outside on the final 200 metres and bursted ahead and won the race by 1.3 lengths. Then, he took a break and return on the autumn campaign. He only finished in third place in the Mainichi Okan as his best performance in the next three races where he failed to win a single one. In his final race of his career before retiring, he finished in seventh-place at the Hong Kong Cup. Eishin Preston's racing registration was terminated and was assigned to be stud at Rex Stud in Shizunai, Hokkaido on December 24, 2003. In all his career races (32 starts), he was jockeyed by a single jockey - Yuichi Fukunaga.

== Racing form ==
Eishin Preston won 10 races and finished in podium seven times out of 32 starts. This data is available in JBIS, netkeiba and HKJC.

Date	Track	Race	Grade	Distance (Condition)	Entry	HN	Odds (Favored)	Finish	Time	Margins	Jockey	Winner (Runner-up)
1999 – two-year-old season
Nov 6	Kyoto	2yo Newcomer		1,600 m (Firm)	13	8	3.0 (2)	2nd	1:35.9	0.7	Yuichi Fukunaga	Daitaku Riva
Nov 20	Kyoto	2yo Newcomer		1,600 m (Firm)	9	7	2.3 (2)	1st	1:35.6	–0.9	Yuichi Fukunaga	(Admire Saber)
Dec 12	Hanshin	Asahi Hai Sansai Stakes	1	1,600 m (Firm)	16	10	8.5 (4)	1st	1:34.7	–0.1	Yuichi Fukunaga	(Legend Hunter)
2000 – three-year-old season
Feb 13	Kyoto	Kisaragi Sho	3	1,800 m (Firm)	12	5	2.4 (1)	9th	1:48.6	0.6	Yuichi Fukunaga	Silver Cockpit
Feb 26	Hanshin	Arlington Cup	3	1,600 m (Firm)	12	12	2.5 (1)	1st	1:35.7	–0.1	Yuichi Fukunaga	(Purple Ebisu)
Apr 8	Tokyo	New Zealand Trophy	2	1,600 m (Firm)	15	12	1.9 (1)	1st	1:34.4	0.0	Yuichi Fukunaga	(Machikane Hokushin)
Oct 28	Kyoto	Swan Stakes	2	1,400 m (Firm)	17	17	9.6 (5)	6th	1:21.0	0.6	Yuichi Fukunaga	Daitaku Yamato
Nov 19	Kyoto	Mile Championship	1	1,600 m (Firm)	18	2	5.7 (4)	5th	1:33.2	0.6	Yuichi Fukunaga	Agnes Digital
2001 – four-year-old season
Jan 5	Kyoto	Kyoto Kimpai	3	1,600 m (Firm)	16	16	4.0 (2)	14th	1:34.5	1.1	Yuichi Fukunaga	Daitaku Riva
Jan 29	Tokyo	Negishi Stakes	3	1,400 m (Muddy)	13	2	26.0 (9)	12th	1:24.5	2.4	Yuichi Fukunaga	Nobo True
Feb 25	Nakayama	Nakayama Kinen	2	1,800 m (Firm)	13	9	23.7 (6)	5th	1:48.8	1.1	Yuichi Fukunaga	American Boss
Apr 1	Nakayama	Lord Derby Challenge Trophy	3	1,600 m (Good)	14	10	5.6 (3)	2nd	1:35.5	0.3	Yuichi Fukunaga	Checkmate
May 13	Tokyo	Keio Hai Spring Cup	2	1,400 m (Firm)	18	6	6.5 (3)	6th	1:20.4	0.3	Yuichi Fukunaga	Stinger
Jun 3	Tokyo	Yasuda Kinen	1	1,600 m (Firm)	18	7	22.9 (10)	10th	1:34.1	1.1	Yuichi Fukunaga	Black Hawk
Jun 23	Hanshin	Yonago Stakes	OP	1,600 m (Firm)	12	2	3.5 (2)	1st	1:34.8	–0.2	Yuichi Fukunaga	(Top Protector)
Jul 15	Kokura	Kitakyushu Kinen	3	1,800 m (Firm)	9	2	4.6 (2)	1st	1:48.3	–0.3	Yuichi Fukunaga	(Rosado)
Aug 5	Niigata	Sekiya Kinen	3	1,600 m (Firm)	9	6	3.6 (1)	3rd	1:32.2	0.4	Yuichi Fukunaga	Magnaten
Oct 7	Tokyo	Mainichi Okan	2	1,800 m (Firm)	12	12	8.8 (5)	1st	1:45.3	–0.1	Yuichi Fukunaga	(Rosado)
Nov 18	Kyoto	Mile Championship	1	1,600 m (Firm)	18	9	6.5 (2)	2nd	1:33.3	0.1	Yuichi Fukunaga	Zenno El Cid
Dec 16	Sha Tin	Hong Kong Mile	1	1,600 m (Firm)	14	3	24.0 (6)	1st	1:34.8	–0.5	Yuichi Fukunaga	(Electronic Unicorn)
2002 – five-year-old season
Feb 24	Nakayama	Nakayama Kinen	2	1,800 m (Firm)	14	9	2.9 (1)	5th	1:45.9	0.5	Yuichi Fukunaga	Tokai Point
Apr 21	Sha Tin	Queen Elizabeth II Cup	1	2,000 m (Good)	14	3	4.6 (2)	1st	2:02.5	–0.1	Yuichi Fukunaga	(Agnes Digital)
Jun 2	Tokyo	Yasuda Kinen	1	1,600 m (Firm)	18	13	2.9 (1)	5th	1:33.6	0.3	Yuichi Fukunaga	Admire Cozzene
Oct 6	Tokyo	Mainichi Okan	2	1,800 m (Firm)	9	2	4.2 (3)	2nd	1:46.4	0.3	Yuichi Fukunaga	Magnaten
Oct 27	Nakayama	Tenno Sho (Autumn)	1	2,000 m (Firm)	18	6	7.6 (5)	8th	1:59.2	0.7	Yuichi Fukunaga	Symboli Kris S
Nov 17	Kyoto	Mile Championship	1	1,600 m (Firm)	18	6	9.6 (3)	2nd	1:32.8	0.0	Yuichi Fukunaga	Tokai Point
Dec 15	Sha Tin	Hong Kong Cup	1	2,000 m (Firm)	12	3	3.8 (2)	5th	2:07.2	0.1	Yuichi Fukunaga	Precision
2003 – six-year-old season
Feb 23	Tokyo	February Stakes	1	1,800 m (Good)	16	14	18.5 (6)	16th	1:57.1	6.2	Yuichi Fukunaga	Gold Allure
Apr 27	Sha Tin	Queen Elizabeth II Cup	1	2,000 m (Firm)	12	1	2.4 (1)	1st	2:03.8	–0.3	Yuichi Fukunaga	(Elegant Fashion)
Oct 12	Tokyo	Mainichi Okan	2	1,800 m (Good)	11	5	9.7 (3)	3rd	1:46.2	0.5	Yuichi Fukunaga	Balance of Game
Nov 2	Tokyo	Tenno Sho (Autumn)	1	2,000 m (Firm)	18	2	7.5 (3)	4th	1:58.5	0.5	Yuichi Fukunaga	Symboli Kris S
Dec 14	Sha Tin	Hong Kong Cup	1	2,000 m (Firm)	14	4	9.3 (4)	7th	2:02.2	1.3	Yuichi Fukunaga	Falbrav

Legend:
Turf Dirt

== Stud record and death ==
Eishin Preston managed to cover up 132 mares and who in turn foaled out 87 progenies. None of his offsprings manage to win graded stakes. He retired from stud in 2019 and spent the rest of his life at the Eishin Bokujo. Eishin Preston died on February 2, 2025, at the age of 28. Fukunaga, who was now a trainer expressed his tribute to him by saying "He was a different horse in Hong Kong, rising to the next level.", denoting his stellar record (5 races, 3 wins) at the Sha Tin Racecourse.

== Pedigree ==
Pedigree of Eishin Preston
Sire Green Dancer b. 1972	Nijinsky b. 1967	Northern Dancer	Nearctic
Sire Green Dancer b. 1972	Nijinsky b. 1967	Northern Dancer	Natalma
Sire Green Dancer b. 1972	Nijinsky b. 1967	Flaming Page	Bull Page
Sire Green Dancer b. 1972	Nijinsky b. 1967	Flaming Page	Flaring Top
Sire Green Dancer b. 1972	Green Valley dk. b. 1967	Val de Loir	Vieux Manoir
Sire Green Dancer b. 1972	Green Valley dk. b. 1967	Val de Loir	Vali
Sire Green Dancer b. 1972	Green Valley dk. b. 1967	Sly Pola	Spy Song
Sire Green Dancer b. 1972	Green Valley dk. b. 1967	Sly Pola	Ampola
Dam Warranty Applied ch. 1986	Monteverdi ch. 1977	Lyphard	Northern Dancer
Dam Warranty Applied ch. 1986	Monteverdi ch. 1977	Lyphard	Goofed
Dam Warranty Applied ch. 1986	Monteverdi ch. 1977	Janima	Match
Dam Warranty Applied ch. 1986	Monteverdi ch. 1977	Janima	Jennifer
Dam Warranty Applied ch. 1986	Implied Warranty ch. 1979	Blood Royal	Ribot
Dam Warranty Applied ch. 1986	Implied Warranty ch. 1979	Blood Royal	Natashka
Dam Warranty Applied ch. 1986	Implied Warranty ch. 1979	Garden Fresh	Better Self
Dam Warranty Applied ch. 1986	Implied Warranty ch. 1979	Garden Fresh	Rosy Fingered

- Eishin Preston is inbred 3 x 4 to Northern Dancer, meaning that this horse appears in both the 3rd and 4th generations of his pedigree.
