= Umamusume: Pretty Derby – Beginning of a New Era =

2024 film by Ken Yamamoto

- Theatrical release poster
- Japanese: ウマ娘 プリティーダービー 新時代の扉
- Revised Hepburn: Umamusume Puritī Dābī Shinjidai no Tobira
- Directed by: Ken Yamamoto
- Screenplay by: Kiyoko Yoshimura
- Based on: Umamusume: Pretty Derby by Cygames
- Produced by: Yutaka Akita
- Starring: Yuri Fujimoto; Sumire Uesaka; Yui Ogura; Haruna Fukushima; Sora Tokui; Eriko Matsui; Kenichi Ogata
- Cinematography: Akane Fushihara; Yūki Kawashita
- Edited by: Kashiko Kimura
- Music by: Masaru Yokoyama
- Production company: CygamesPictures
- Distributed by: Toho
- Release date: May 24, 2024 (Japan)
- Running time: 108 minutes
- Country: Japan
- Language: Japanese
- Box office: $10 million

Umamusume: Pretty Derby – Beginning of a New Era (Note: Japanese: ウマ娘 プリティーダービー 新時代の扉, Hepburn: Umamusume Puritī Dābī Shinjidai no Tobira) is a 2024 Japanese animated sports drama film directed by Ken Yamamoto from a screenplay by Kiyoko Yoshimura. Based on the multimedia franchise Umamusume: Pretty Derby that centers on the titular anthropomorphic racehorses, it is produced by CygamesPictures and stars Yuri Fujimoto, Sumire Uesaka, Yui Ogura, Haruna Fukushima, Sora Tokui, Eriko Matsui, and Kenichi Ogata. The film is loosely based on events surrounding the 2001 Japanese Classic Races and follows Jungle Pocket in her journey to become one of the strongest racers while facing strong competition.

Umamusume: Pretty Derby – Beginning of a New Era was released in Japan on May 24, 2024, and grossed over US$8.6 million in its initial box office run. It was released in North America by GAGA Corporation on February 27, 2026, grossing US$1.2 million in a limited theatrical run.

== Plot ==
Delinquent racer Jungle Pocket travels to the racetrack with her friends to watch a Twinkle Series race, where she witnesses Fuji Kiseki win. Inspired by her performance, Jungle Pocket decides to become a Twinkle Series racer herself and enrolls at Tracen Academy to join Fuji Kiseki's team led by the trainer Tanabe. Jungle Pocket wins her preliminary races, allowing her to enter her first high-profile race at the Hopeful Stakes.

While entering the racetrack, Jungle Pocket meets the eccentric Agnes Tachyon. Jungle Pocket remains confident in winning the Hopeful Stakes, only for Agnes Tachyon to defeat her in an upset. Between her loss and witnessing the formidable T. M. Opera O win the Arima Kinen, Jungle Pocket is inspired to get stronger to defeat them. She makes a direct challenge to Agnes Tachyon and declares her as her rival, during which she becomes acquainted with Dantsu Flame and Manhattan Cafe.

Agnes Tachyon slyly accepts Jungle Pocket's rivalry and monitors Jungle Pocket's training and subsequent races to further her research. Agnes Tachyon also defeats Manhattan Cafe at the Yayoi Sho, where she becomes concerned with her body's condition. As Jungle Pocket trains for her upcoming races, Fuji Kiseki opens up on being forced to retire before the Japanese Derby due to a leg injury, adding that she hopes Jungle Pocket can win the race to fulfill her promise of making Tanabe a "Derby Trainer".

Jungle Pocket holds her rematch against Agnes Tachyon at the Satsuki Shō with Dantsu Flame, though she is soundly beaten again. Agnes Tachyon later announces her indefinite hiatus from the Twinkle Series. An angered and anguished Jungle Pocket confronts Agnes Tachyon on abandoning their rivalry, where Agnes Tachyon responds with becoming more interested in research than racing. As Jungle Pocket leaves with Dantsu Flame and Manhattan Cafe, Agnes Tachyon vaguely remarks she wants to see Jungle Pocket surpass her.

Tanabe meets with a frustrated Jungle Pocket and surmises that Agnes Tachyon suffered a leg injury from trying to surpass the limits of an Umamusume, before encouraging her to continue training. Jungle Pocket and Dantsu Flame later duel in the Japanese Derby as Agnes Tachyon watches on, hoping her provocations will push Jungle Pocket to her limits. Jungle Pocket wins the race and fulfills Fuji Kiseki and Tanabe's promise, while Agnes Tachyon realizes she will be left behind by her rivals winning in her stead and becomes reclusive.

Despite her victory and brief stint of fame, Jungle Pocket remains haunted by the inability to prove herself against Agnes Tachyon and feeling she is not strong enough, causing her to fall into a slump and lose the Kikuka-shō to Manhattan Cafe. Seeing Jungle Pocket's troubles, Fuji Kiseki reminds her of the reason she started racing by challenging her to a duel. Jungle Pocket later visits a lonely Agnes Tachyon, reiterating her desire to go up against her in spite of her self-doubt, before leaving to train for the Japan Cup.

At the Japan Cup, a determined Jungle Pocket faces off against T. M. Opera O and a contingent of strong domestic and international Umamusume, where she overcomes her self-doubt at the final stretch and wins. Agnes Tachyon witnesses Jungle Pocket's drive to race and is inspired to end her hiatus. At a future race, Jungle Pocket and Agnes Tachyon have an opportunity for a rematch with Dantsu Flame and Manhattan Cafe, and the four later perform their Winning Live Concert.

== Voice cast ==
Character	Voice actor
Jungle Pocket (ジャングルポケット, Janguru Poketto)	Yuri Fujimoto
Agnes Tachyon (アグネスタキオン, Agunesu Takion)	Sumire Uesaka
Manhattan Cafe (マンハッタンカフェ, Manhattan Kafe)	Yui Ogura
Dantsu Flame (ダンツフレーム, Dantsu Furēmu)	Haruna Fukushima
T. M. Opera O (テイエムオペラオー, Tei Emu Opera Ō)	Sora Tokui
Fuji Kiseki (フジキセキ)	Eriko Matsui
Trainer Tanabe (タナベトレーナー, Tanabe Torēnā)	Kenichi Ogata
Narita Top Road (ナリタトップロード, Narita Toppu Rōdo)	Kanna Nakamura
Meisho Doto (メイショウドトウ, Meishou Dotou)	Misaki Watada
Ru (ルー, Rū)	Miyuki Sakurai
Shima (シマ)	Yurie Igoma
Mai (メイ, Mei)	Saya Hitomi
Nana Izumoto (泉本 奈々, Izumoto Nana)	Rina Honnizumi

== Production ==
On December 28, 2023, an anime film that is part of the Umamusume: Pretty Derby multimedia franchise, titled Umamusume: Pretty Derby – Beginning of a New Era, was announced through a teaser visual and trailer. It would be produced by CygamesPictures and directed by Ken Yamamoto, with Kiyoko Yoshimura writing the script, Tetsuya Kobari serving as scenario director and story organizer, Jun Yamazaki designing the characters and serving as chief animation director, and Masaru Yokoyama composing the music.

In several interviews leading up to the film's North American release, Ken Yamamoto shared various details about its production. Yamamoto revealed the film had been in production for three years, adding that it began prior to the development of the franchise's OVA Road to the Top. He remarked that despite the film being part of an existing franchise, he experienced a "high degree of creative freedom" due to the franchise's nature of treating its characters' storylines as standalone narratives, granting the team the opportunity to incorporate drama and other genres into the story.

Yamamoto has cited the real-life Agnes Tachyon's dominance during his brief racing career as the deciding factor to have his contemporary Jungle Pocket as the film's protagonist, framing their rivalry as having major ramifications to Jungle Pocket's character. He also elaborated the importance of humanizing characters who are the anthropomorphic representations of racehorses, adding that he felt Agnes Tachyon and Fuji Kiseki, among others, are integral to the film's story.

When asked on how the film's races were animated, Yamamoto remarks that he used jockey cams recorded during real-life horse races as source material. He also shared that the team coordinated thoroughly to convey its grounded nature using motion, color palettes, and editing, while also expressing the narrative purpose of each represented race.

On March 22, 2024, the film's official website also revealed the main theme song, titled "Ready!! Steady!! Derby!!". The song is performed by Yuri Fujimoto, Sumire Uesaka, Yui Ogura, and Haruna Fukushima as their respective characters.

== Release ==
The film was released in Japanese theaters on May 24, 2024. The film was promoted alongside Godzilla x Kong: The New Empire as part of a collaboration. It was later announced that the film would also see a theatrical release in Taiwan and Hong Kong, with Medialink licensing the film in the aforementioned regions.

In January 2026, it was announced that the film would receive a theatrical release in North America, with GAGA Corporation licensing and releasing the film with English subtitles. It is the first anime film to be distributed by GAGA Corporation in North America. It was released on February 27, 2026, screening in 600 theaters.

It was announced on March 20, 2026, that the film would receive a theatrical release in Australia and New Zealand through Sugoi Co with the film being released on April 17, 2026.

It was also announced that the film would finally release theatrically in Indonesia's select movie theater chains through Moxienotion, slated to be released on early May 2026.

== Reception ==
=== Box office ===
Umamusume: Pretty Derby – Beginning of a New Era debuted at first in gross, earning over ¥354 million (about $2.25 million) on its opening weekend, and at second in attendance. The film has earned ¥1.4 billion (about $8.7 million) in its run in Japanese theaters. In its North American release, the film opened at #13 in the box office, making $896,293 in its opening weekend and grossed $1,272,838 overall in its run.

=== Critical response ===
On the Japanese review aggregator website Filmarks, the film received an average rating of 4.14/5.0, out of 962 reviews.

English-language reviewers reacted positively to the film. Richard Eisenbeis from Anime News Network gave it a B+; he commended how the film reinterprets the 2000-2001 Japanese horse racing season with emotional and psychological complexity, adding depth to the main leads in Jungle Pocket and Agnes Tachyon. However, he noted that certain characters who were the leads' real-life racing contemporaries, notably Manhattan Cafe and Dantsu Flame, felt lacking in their character development, remarking that they "seem shoehorned in because they were around in real life". Elijah Gonzales from The A.V. Club also rated the film a B+ grade, concluding that despite these drawbacks and the confusing nature of the races to viewers unfamiliar with the franchise, the film "captures the irrational passion of sports in all its hooved glory." The Student Life writer Joon Kim said the movie "will leave a good impression on many viewers" and praised the story, visuals, and sound design, as well as the portrayal of Jungle Pocket and Agnes Tachyon's rivalry. However, he felt the film was held back from being "umazing" because of the "flat" side characters, which he felt weren't "nearly given as much time to shine" as the main characters.

== See also ==
- List of films about horse racing
