= Niigata Daishoten =

Niigata Daishoten 新潟大賞典
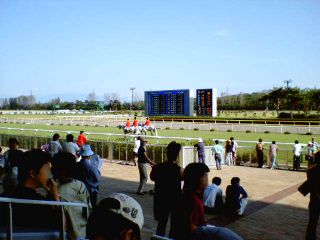
- Niigata Racecourse from the stands
- Class: Grade 3
- Location: Niigata Racecourse
- Inaugurated: 1979
- Race type: Thoroughbred Flat racing

Race information
- Distance: 2000 metres
- Surface: Turf
- Track: Left-handed
- Qualification: 4-y-o+
- Weight: Handicap
- Purse: ¥ 92,980,000 (as of 2025): 1st: ¥ 43,000,000; 2nd: ¥ 17,000,000; 3rd: ¥ 11,000,000

The Niigata Daishoten (Japanese 新潟大賞典) is a Grade 3 horse race organized by Japan Racing Association (JRA) for Thoroughbreds aged four and over. It is run in late April or early May over a distance of 2000 metres on turf at Niigata Racecourse.

The Niigata Daishoten was first run in its current form in 1979 and has held Grade 3 status since 1984. The race was run at Fukushima Racecourse in 1985, 1990, 1995, 2000 and 2001. It was run over 2200 metres in 1984, from 1986 to 1989 and from 1991 to 1994.

== Winners since 2000 ==
Year	Winner	Age	Jockey	Trainer	Owner	Time
2000	Tayasu Meadow	5	Yukihiro Dohi	Keiji Kato	Kanichi Yokose	2:01.0
2001	Silent Hunter	8	Yutaka Yoshida	Yokichi Okubo	Hiroyoshi Usuda	1:59.5
2002	King Fidelia	4	Hideaki Miyuki	Hiroshi Takeda	Mamoru Kato	1:58.8
2003	Dantsu Flame	5	Masaru Honda	Kenji Yamauchi	Tetsuji Yamamoto	1:58.3
2004	Meiner Amundsen	5	Naohiro Onishi	Kiyotaka Tanaka	Thoroughbred Club Ruffian	2:00.5
2005	Air Selecao	5	Shinji Fujita	Yuji Ito	Lucky Field	1:58.9
2006	Osumi Grass One	4	Hirofumi Shii	Masatoshi Ando	Osumi	1:59.1
2007	Bright Tomorrow	5	Hatsuhiro Kowata	Sei Ishikaza	Sunday Racing	1:57.7
2008	Osumi Grass One	6	Yuga Kawada	Yoshiyuki Arakawa	Osumi	1:58.5
2009	Shingen	6	Shinji Fujita	Hirofumi Toda	Teruhito Hanaki	1:56.9
2010	Golden Dahlia	6	Yoshitomi Shibata	Yoshitaka Ninomiya	Hachiro Tanaka	1:57.7
2011	Sacred Valley	5	Genki Maruyama	Yutaka Takahashi	Katsumi Yoshida	1:58.4
2012	Hit The Target	4	Yoshihiro Furukawa	Keiji Kato	Shinji Maeda	1:59.0
2013	Passion Dance	5	Kota Fukioka	Yasuo Tomomichi	Kaneko Makoto Holdings	1:56.9
2014	Yule Singing	4	Hayato Yoshida	Kazuhiro Seishi	Shadai Race Horse	1:59.2
2015	D'Accord	7	Futoshi Komaki	Kazuya Nakatake	North Hills	1:59.6
2016	Passion Dance	8	Akihide Tsumura	Yasuo Tomomichi	Kaneko Makoto Holdings	1:57.8
2017	Sunday Wizard	5	Shu Ishibashi	Ryuji Okubo	Yuko Tatsumi	1:58.6
2018	Suzuka Devious	7	Kousei Miura	Mitsuru Hashida	Keiji Nagai	2:00.0
2019	Mer de Glace	4	Damian Lane	Hisashi Shimizu	Carrot Farm	1:58.6
2020	Tosen Surya	5	Kazuo Yokoyama	Jiro Ono	Takaya Shimakawa	1:58.6
2021	Sanrei Pocket	6	Katsuma Sameshima	Yoshitada Takahashi	Keiji Nagai	1:59.3
2022	Red Galant	7	Yasunari Iwata	Takayuki Yasuda	Tokyo Horse Racing	1:57.7
2023	Karate	7	Akira Sugawara	Yasuyuki Tsujino	Hikaru Odagiri	2:03.8
2024	Yamanin Salvum	5	Arata Saito	Naoya Nakamura	Hajime Doi	2:00.1
2025	Sirius Colt	4	Yoshihiro Furukawa	Katsuharu Tanaka	Masatake Iida	2:00.5
2026	Gran Dia	7	Atsuya Nishimura	Mitsumasa Nakauchida	Carrot Farm	1:58.9

== Earlier winners ==
- 1979 - Cherry Ryu
- 1980 - Fast Amon
- 1981 - Juji Arrow
- 1982 - Hase Shinobu
- 1983 - Kiyo Hidaka
- 1984 - Micron Tenro
- 1985 - Kane Kuroshio
- 1986 - Super Gura Third
- 1987 - Sette Juno
- 1988 - Make A Smart
- 1989 - Memory Vica
- 1990 - Yuwa Forte
- 1991 - Tosho Balkan
- 1992 - Mejiro Palmer
- 1993 - Hashino Kenshiro
- 1994 - Golden Hour
- 1995 - Irish Dance
- 1996 - Maillot Jaune
- 1997 - Maillot Jaune
- 1998 - Silent Hunter
- 1999 - Brilliant Road

== See also ==
- Horse racing in Japan
- List of Japanese flat horse races
