= Northern River (horse) =

Japanese thoroughbred racehorse

Northern River ノーザンリバー
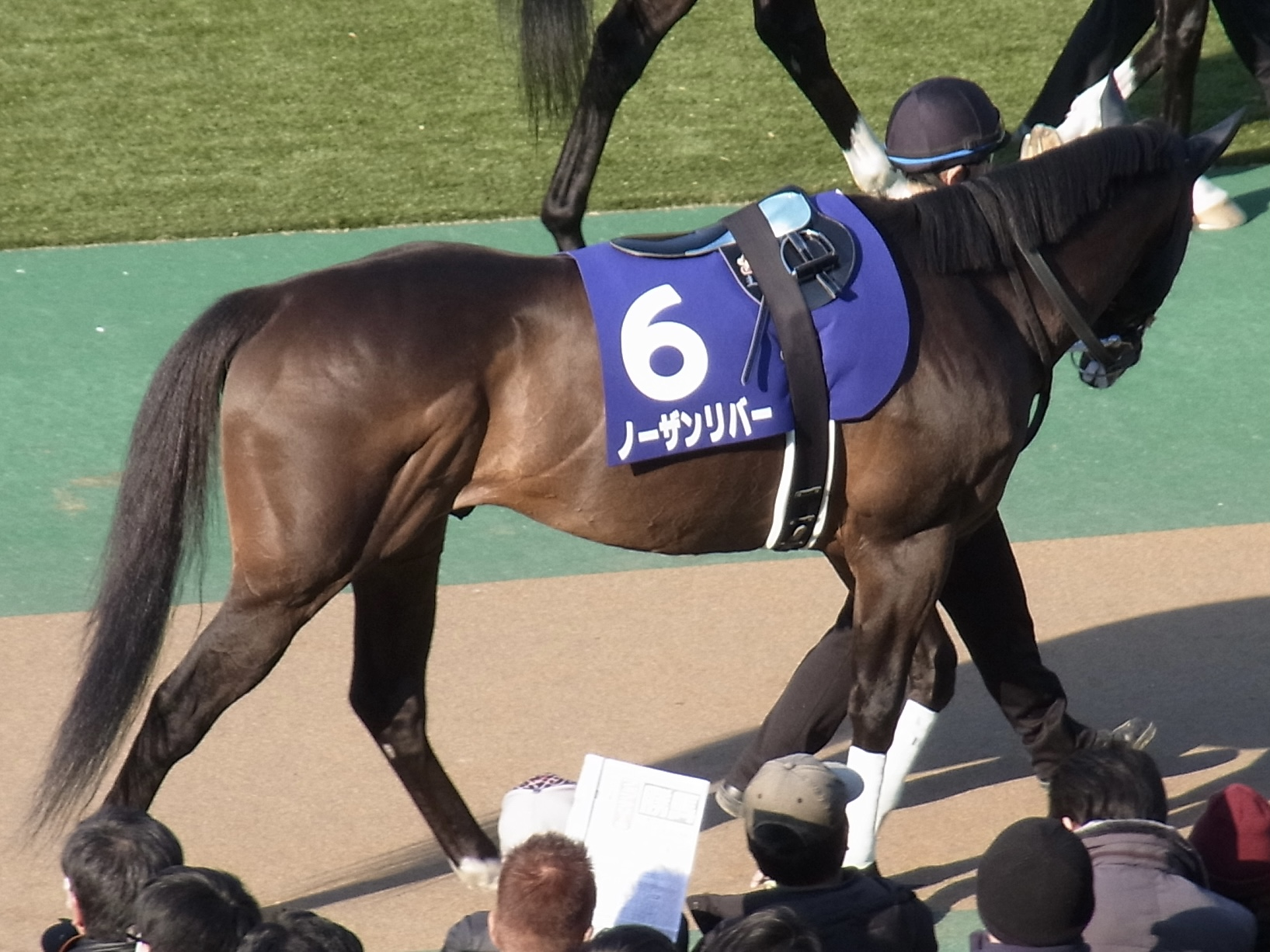
- Northern River at the paddock of the 2014 February Stakes
- Breed: Thoroughbred
- Sire: Agnes Tachyon
- Grandsire: Sunday Silence
- Dam: Soninke
- Damsire: Machiavellian
- Sex: Stallion
- Foaled: April 12, 2008
- Country: Japan
- Colour: Bay
- Breeder: Northern Farm
- Owner: Masamichi Hayashi
- Racing colours
- Trainer: Hidekazu Asami
- Jockey: Masayoshi Ebina
- Record: 28: 10-4-3
- Earnings: ¥316,876,000

Major wins
- Arlington Cup (2011); Capella Stakes (2013); Tokyo Sprint (2014); Tokyo Hai (2014); Sakitama Hai (2014, 2015)

Northern River (Japanese:ノーザンリバー, Hepburn: Nōzan Ribā; foaled April 12, 2008) is a Japanese retired Thoroughbred racehorse, a breeding stallion and the winner of the 2011 Arlington Cup.

== Background ==
Northern River was bred in Northern Farm out of Soninke, an English bred broodmare sired by Machiavellian, the 1989 Prix Morny winner. He himself was sired by the 2008 leading sire in Japan and 2001 Satsuki Sho winner, Agnes Tachyon. In the 2009 select sale for yearlings, he was labeled as hip number ten and sold to Masamichi Hayashi for 58,800,000 ¥. He was the first horse that Hayashi bought once he received his racehorses' owner license.

The meaning behind the horse's name is "to carry on the long-standing history of the breeding farm (Northern) and to express the wish for it to reach the open sea (River)."

== Racing career ==
His brother is Renforcer, who won the 2011 Elm Stakes and 2012 Diolite Kinen.

Northern River's first race was on September 11, 2010, at Sapporo, where he came in 2nd. Northern River picked up his win in Kyoto on January 16, 2011. He then picked up another win 2 week later in Kyoto, and then won the 2011 Arlington Cup.

This win helped earn Northern River a place in the Grade-1, 2011 Satsuki Sho, where he finished in a disappointing 15th place. He attempted another Grade-1 race in May 2011, where he came in 17th at the 2011 Tokyo Yūshun.

He did not race in 2012. In 2013, he picked up another win at the 2013 Fukakusa Stakes in Kyoto. Later in November, he picked up another win at Kyoto. He then scored a Grade-3 win, by winning the 2013 Capella Stakes.

He spent 2014 competing in graded races. In February, he came in 4th at the 2014 February Stakes, and then won the Tokyo Hai in April, and won the Sakitama Hai in Urawa in May. He then picked up his last win on the year in October at the 2014 Tokyo Hai.

2015 was his last year in racing. He placed 3rd at the Tokyo Sprint in April, then won the Sakitama Hai in May. He then retired after an 8th place finish at the 2015 Japan Breeding farms' Cup Sprint.

== Racing form ==
Northern River won ten races and placed in another seven out of 28 starts. This data is available based on JBIS and netkeiba.

Date	Track	Race	Grade	Distance (Condition)	Entry	HN	Odds (Favored)	Finish	Time	Margins	Jockey	Winner (Runner-up)
2010 – two-year-old season
Sep 11	Sapporo	2yo Newcomer		1,500 m (Firm)	14	9	7.6 (2)	2nd	1:32.5	0.2	Hirofumi Shii	Reve d'Essor
Dec 25	Hanshin	2yo Maiden		1,600 m (Firm)	18	14	6.0 (4)	3rd	1:36.5	0.1	Yutaka Take	Caldo Brezza
2011 – three-year-old season
Jan 16	Kyoto	3yo Maiden		1,400 m (Fast)	16	4	2.9 (2)	1st	1:26.1	–1.3	Yutaka Take	(Melot)
Jan 30	Kyoto	3yo Allowance	1W	1,400 m (Fast)	15	7	1.6 (1)	1st	1:26.1	–0.4	Hirofumi Shii	(Kimon Red)
Feb 26	Hanshin	Arlington Cup	GIII	1,600 m (Firm)	13	12	8.0 (4)	1st	1:34.2	–0.1	Yutaka Take	(Kyoei Basara)
Apr 24	Tokyo	Satsuki Sho	GI	2,000 m (Firm)	18	3	26.1 (9)	15th	2:02.2	1.6	Hirofumi Shii	Orfevre
May 29	Tokyo	Tokyo Yushun	GI	2,400 m (Heavy)	18	18	101.1 (16)	17th	2:35.1	4.6	Nicola Pinna	Orfevre
2013 – five-year-old season
Mar 16	Hanshin	Naniwa Stakes	ALW (3W)	1,200 m (Fast)	15	8	44.3 (9)	6th	1:11.9	0.3	Hirofumi Shii	Dasher One
Mar 31	Nakayama	Harukaze Stakes	ALW (3W)	1,200 m (Fast)	16	1	3.2 (1)	2nd	1:10.9	0.0	Ryuji Wada	Laugh Away
May 19	Kyoto	Fukakusa Stakes	ALW (3W)	1,200 m (Fast)	16	16	1.9 (1)	1st	1:10.7	–0.2	Hideaki Miyuki	(K G Hayabusa)
Jul 14	Fukushima	Baden-Baden Cup	OP	1,200 m (Good)	16	2	6.5 (4)	6th	1:10.9	0.4	Hiroyuki Uchida	Meiner Eternel
Aug 14	Morioka	Cluster Cup	JPNIII (Note: All JPN graded races are graded as "Listed" internationally)	1,200 m (Fast)	14	10	5.1 (4)	3rd	1:09.6	0.1	Yutaka Take	Love Michan
Sep 14	Hanshin	Enif Stakes	OP	1,400 m (Fast)	12	11	4.1 (3)	5th	1:23.7	0.3	Hideaki Miyuki	Admire Sagace
Oct 5	Tokyo	Perseus Stakes	OP	1,400 m (Sloppy)	16	8	9.3 (5)	4th	1:23.0	0.6	Hiroyuki Uchida	Gorski
Nov 24	Kyoto	Kyoto Autumn Leaf Premium	OP	1,400 m (Fast)	16	2	7.3 (4)	1st	1:23.4	0.0	Ryuji Wada	(Narita Super One)
Dec 8	Nakayama	Capella Stakes	GIII	1,200 m (Fast)	16	1	11.2 (6)	1st	1:10.7	0.0	Yoshitomi Shibata	(Snow Dragon)
2014 – six-year-old season
Feb 2	Tokyo	Negishi Stakes	GIII	1,400 m (Fast)	16	9	19.7 (8)	2nd	1:23.5	0.1	Masayoshi Ebina	Gorski
Feb 23	Tokyo	February Stakes	GI	1,600 m (Fast)	16	6	74.5 (11)	4th	1:36.4	0.4	Keita Tosaki	Copano Rickey
Apr 2	Ohi	Tokyo Sprint	JPNIII	1,200 m (Fast)	16	13	1.5 (1)	1st	1:10.7	–0.6	Masayoshi Ebina	(Sei Crimson)
Apr 29	Nagoya	Kakitsubata Kinen	JPNIII	1,400 m (Sloppy)	12	8	1.2 (1)	2nd	1:27.2	0.0	Masayoshi Ebina	Tagano Zingaro
May 28	Urawa	Sakitama Hai	JPNII	1,400 m (Muddy)	12	3	1.8 (1)	1st	1:26.7	–0.1	Masayoshi Ebina	(Tokino Excellent)
Jul 13	Chukyo	Procyon Stakes	GIII	1,400 m (Good)	16	13	7.2 (3)	4th	1:22.8	0.2	Masayoshi Ebina	Best Warrior
Oct 1	Ohi	Tokyo Hai	JPNII	1,200 m (Fast)	11	5	1.4 (1)	1st	1:10.2	–0.1	Masayoshi Ebina	(Dream Valentino)
Nov 3	Morioka	JBC Sprint	JPNI	1,200 m (Muddy)	16	1	1.9 (1)	5th	1:09.3	0.3	Masayoshi Ebina	Dream Valentino
Dec 14	Nakayama	Capella Stakes	GIII	1,200 m (Fast)	15	3	5.6 (3)	12th	1:10.8	1.3	Kousei Miura	Danon Legend
2015 – seven-year-old season
Apr 8	Ohi	Tokyo Sprint	JPNIII	1,200 m (Sloppy)	14	13	5.4 (3)	3rd	1:11.3	0.7	Masayoshi Ebina	Danon Legend
May 27	Urawa	Sakitama Hai	JPNII	1,400 m (Fast)	11	10	2.6 (1)	1st	1:26.7	–0.8	Masayoshi Ebina	(Trois Bonheur)
Nov 3	Morioka	JBC Sprint	JPNI	1,200 m (Sloppy)	16	7	20.1 (6)	8th	1:11.9	1.0	Masayoshi Ebina	Corin Berry

Legend:
Dirt Turf

== Stud career ==
Northern River's descendants include:

c = colt, f = filly, g = gelding

Foaled	Name	Sex	Major Wins
2017	Bon Bon Chocolat	f	Rusu Hai Hidaka Sho
2017	In The Future	c	Gold Wing Sho
2017	Storm Dog	g	Tokai Gold Cup

== Pedigree ==
Pedigree of Northern River (JPN), 2008
Sire Agnes Tachyon (JPN) 1998	Sunday Silence (USA); 1986	Halo	Hail to Reason
Sire Agnes Tachyon (JPN) 1998	Sunday Silence (USA); 1986	Halo	Cosmah
Sire Agnes Tachyon (JPN) 1998	Sunday Silence (USA); 1986	Wishing Well	Understanding
Sire Agnes Tachyon (JPN) 1998	Sunday Silence (USA); 1986	Wishing Well	Mountain Flower
Sire Agnes Tachyon (JPN) 1998	Agnes Flora (JPN); 1987	Royal Ski	Raja Baba
Sire Agnes Tachyon (JPN) 1998	Agnes Flora (JPN); 1987	Royal Ski	Coz o'Nijinsky
Sire Agnes Tachyon (JPN) 1998	Agnes Flora (JPN); 1987	Agnes Lady	Remand
Sire Agnes Tachyon (JPN) 1998	Agnes Flora (JPN); 1987	Agnes Lady	Ikoma Eikan
Dam Soninke (GB) 1996	Machiavellian (USA); 1987	Mr. Prospector	Raise a Native
Dam Soninke (GB) 1996	Machiavellian (USA); 1987	Mr. Prospector	Gold Digger
Dam Soninke (GB) 1996	Machiavellian (USA); 1987	Coup de Folie	Halo
Dam Soninke (GB) 1996	Machiavellian (USA); 1987	Coup de Folie	Raise the Standard
Dam Soninke (GB) 1996	Sonic Lady (USA); 1983	Nureyev	Northern Dancer
Dam Soninke (GB) 1996	Sonic Lady (USA); 1983	Nureyev	Special
Dam Soninke (GB) 1996	Sonic Lady (USA); 1983	Stumped	Owen Anthony
Dam Soninke (GB) 1996	Sonic Lady (USA); 1983	Stumped	Luckhurst
