= New Zealand Trophy =

New Zealand Trophy ニュージーランドトロフィー
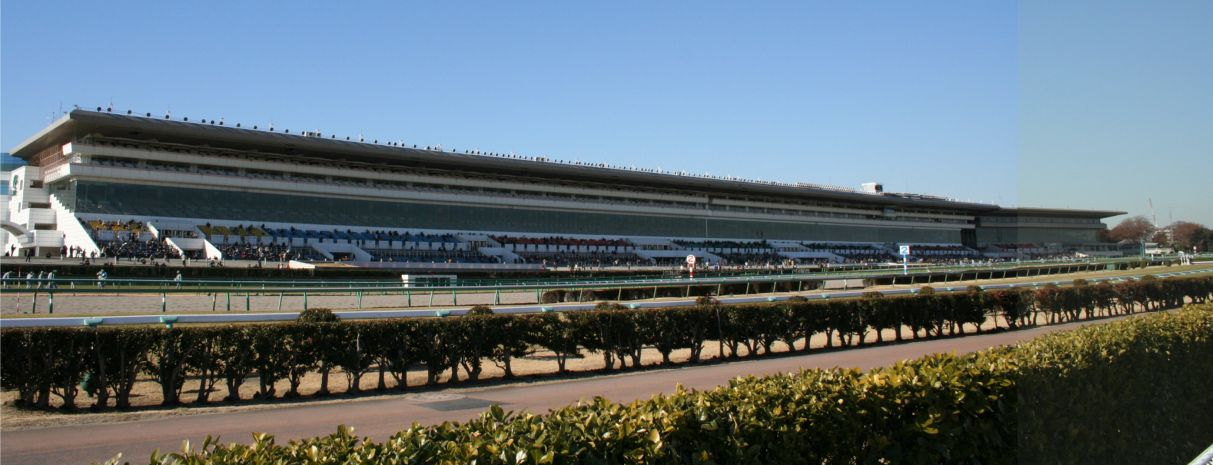
- Nakayama Racecourse
- Class: Grade 2
- Location: Nakayama Racecourse
- Race type: Thoroughbred Flat racing

Race information
- Distance: 1600 metres
- Surface: Turf
- Track: Right-handed
- Qualification: 3-y-o
- Weight: 57 kg Allowance: Fillies 2 kg
- Purse: ¥ 117,540,000 (as of 2025): 1st: ¥ 54,000,000; 2nd: ¥ 22,000,000; 3rd: ¥ 14,000,000

The New Zealand Trophy (Japanese ニュージーランドトロフィー) is a Grade 2 flat horse race in Japan for three-year-old Thoroughbreds. It is run over a distance of 1600 metres at Nakayama Racecourse in April.

The New Zealand Trophy was first run in 1983, when it was held at Tokyo Racecourse, and was elevated to Grade 3 status in 1984 before being promoted to Grade 2 in 1987. Since 1996, the race serves as a trial race for the NHK Mile Cup. Following the inauguration of the NHK Mile Cup in 1996, the race was shortened to 1400 meters, before returning to 1600m and moved to Nakayama in 2000.

Among the winners of the race have been Oguri Cap, Eishin Preston and El Condor Pasa.

== Winners ==
Year	Winner	Jockey	Trainer	Owner	Time
1983	Upsetter	Yukio Okabe	Kazuo Tanaka	Horseman	1:37.0
1984	Nippo Swallow	Nobuhiro Ebina	Kinzo Kubota	Yuichi Yamaishi	1:37.8
1985	Maruyo Plaid	Seiji Sakuta	Kohei Take	Haruyuki Nomura	1:38.6
1986	Nippo Teio	Hiroyuki Gohara	Kinzo Kubota	Yuichi Yamaishi	1:36.8
1987	Yuwa James	Tomio Yasuda	Kohei Take	Yuwa	1:35.2
1988	Oguri Cap	Hiroshi Kawachi	Tsutomu Setoguchi	Isoo Sahashi	1:34.0
1989	Aquavit	Masato Shibata	Isao Shimada	Nasuno Bokujo	1:35.1
1990	Music Time	Yukio Okabe	Yasuhisa Matsuyama	Zenya Yoshida	1:34.9
1991	Weiss Cedar	Yoshitomi Shibata	Yutaka Masumoto	Hideo Sugiura	1:35.3
1992	Shinko Lovely	Yukio Okabe	Kazuo Fujisawa	Osamu Yasuda	1:34.9
1993	Toyo Lyphard	Masahiro Matsunaga	Yoshiharu Matsunaga	Toyo Club	1:34.6
1994	Hishi Amazon	Eiji Nakadate	Takao Nakano	Masaichiro Abe	1:35.8
1995	Shake Hand	Junichi Serizawa	Yoshio Oki	Maeko Farm	1:35.3
1996	Fabulous La Fouine	Shinji Fujita	Hiroyuki Nagahama	Kazuko Yoshida	1:22.4
1997	Seeking The Pearl	Yutaka Take	Hideyuki Mori	Tomoko Uenaka	1:21.1
1998	El Condor Pasa	Hitoshi Matoba	Yoshitaka Ninomiya	Takashi Watanabe	1:22.2
1999	Zachariah	Hitoshi Matoba	Yoshitaka Ninomiya	Hidekazu Date	1:23.4
2000	Eishin Preston	Yuichi Fukunaga	Shuji Kitahashi	Toyomitsu Hirai	1:34.4
2001	Kitasan Channel	Ryo Takahashi	Kojiro Hashiguchi	Ono Shoji	1:35.7
2002	Taiki Lion	Yoshitomi Shibata	Kiyotaka Tanaka	Taiki Farm	1:32.1
2003	Eishin Tsurugizan	Norihiro Yokoyama	Hideaki Fujiwara	Toyomitsu Hirai	1:34.6
2004	Seeking The Dia	Yutaka Take	Hideyuki Mori	Yoichi Aoyama	1:33.5
2005	Meiner Hearty	Hiroyuki Uchida	Hitoshi Nakamura	Thoroughbred Club Ruffian	1:33.4
2006	Meiner Scherzi	Yoshitomi Shibata	Ryuichi Inaba	Thoroughbred Club Ruffian	1:33.5
2007	Toho Racer	Hiroki Goto	Yoshihiko Kawamura	Toho Bussan	1:33.9
2008	Satono Progress	Norihiro Yokoyama	Sakae Kunieda	Hajime Satomi	1:35.0
2009	San Carlo	Yutaka Yoshida	Yokichi Okubo	Shadai Race Horse	1:33.8
2010	Sunrise Prince	Norihiro Yokoyama	Hidetaka Otonashi	Takao Matsuoka	1:32.9
2011 ^{[1]}	Eishin Osman	Hideaki Miyuki	Masahiro Matsuaga	Toyomitsu Hirai	1:34.5
2012	Curren Black Hill	Shinichiro Akiyama	Osamu Hirata	Takashi Suzuki	1:33.2
2013	A Shin Top	Hiroyuki Uchida	Masato Nishizono	Eishindo	1:34.8
2014	Shonan Achieve	Hiroki Goto	Sakae Kunieda	Tetsuhide Kunimoto	1:33.3
2015	Yamakatsu Ace	Kenichi Ikezoe	Kaneo Ikezoe	Kazuo Yamada	1:34.8
2016	Dantsu Prius	Genki Maruyama	Kenji Yamauchi	Tetsuji Yamamoto	1:33.9
2017	Jo Strictly	Andrasch Starke	Hisashi Shimizu	Keiko Ueda	1:36.0
2018	Katsuji	Kohei Matsuyama	Kaneo Ikezoe	Kanayama Holdings	1:34.2
2019	Wide Pharaoh	Hiroyuki Uchida	Katsuhiko Sumii	Masanobu Habata	1:34.2
2020	Luftstrom	Shu Ishibashi	Noriyuki Hori	Sunday Racing	1:33.0
2021	Bathrat Leon	Yusuke Fujioka	Yoshito Yahagi	Hiroo Race	1:33.1
2022	Jean Gros	Yutaka Take	Hideyuki Mori	Susumu Fujita	1:33.5
2023	Eeyan	Mirco Demuro	Daishi Ito	Nisshin Industry	1:33.7
2024	Ecoro Bloom	Takeshi Yokoyama	Yukihiro Kato	Masatoshi Haramura	1:34.4
2025	Immigrant Song	Yukito Ishikawa	Tetsuhide Tsuji	Katsumi Yoshida	1:32.4
2026	Reservation	Yusuke Hara	Takeshi Matsushita	Isami Nakamura	1:33.3

^{1} The 2011 race took place at Hanshin Racecourse.

== See also ==
- Horse racing in Japan
- List of Japanese flat horse races
