= Daily Hai Nisai Stakes =

Daily Hai Nisai Stakes デイリー杯2歳ステークス
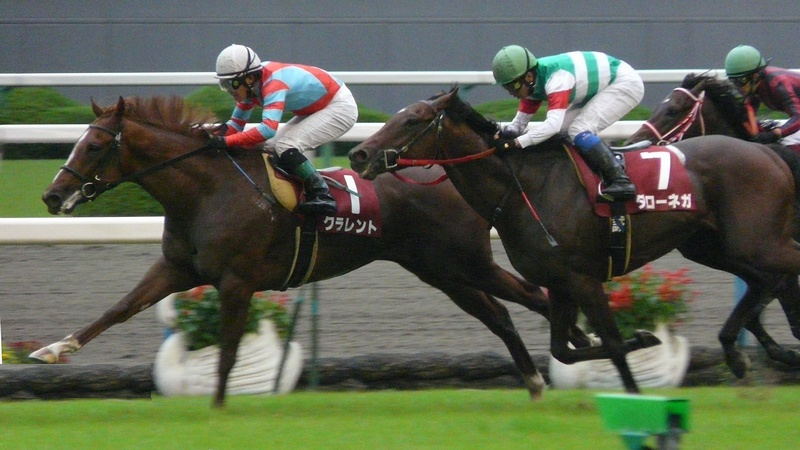
- 2011 Daily Hai Nisai Stakes
- Class: Grade 2
- Location: Kyoto Racecourse
- Inaugurated: 1966
- Race type: Thoroughbred Flat racing

Race information
- Distance: 1,600 meters
- Surface: Turf
- Track: Right-handed
- Qualification: 2-y-o colts and fillies
- Weight: 56 kg Allowance: Fillies 2 kg
- Purse: ¥ 86,400,000 (as of 2026): 1st: ¥ 40,000,000; 2nd: ¥ 16,000,000; 3rd: ¥ 10,000,000

The Daily Hai Nisai Stakes (Japanese デイリー杯2歳ステークス) is a Grade 2 flat horse race in Japan for two-year-old Thoroughbreds. It is run over a distance of 1,600 meters at Kyoto Racecourse in November.

The Daily Hai Nisai Stakes was first run in 1966 and was elevated to Grade 2 status in 1984. It was usually run over 1,400 meters until 1996. It serves as a trial race for the Asahi Hai Futurity Stakes and the Hopeful Stakes.

== Winners since 2000 ==
Year	Winner	Jockey	Trainer	Owner	Time
2000	Fujino Tenby	Katsumi Ando	Nakayama Yoshinobu	Seisuke Ohashi	1.34.6
2001	Fast Tateyama	Yasuhiko Yasuda	Isao Yasuda	Yukio Tsuji	1:34.9
2002	Silk Bravo	Hiroki Goto	Shoichi Matsumoto	Silk	1.33.9
2003	Meisho Bowler	Yuichi Fukunaga	Toshiaki Shirai	Yoshio Matsumoto	1.34.1
2004	Peer Gynt	Futoshi Komaki	Kojiro Hashiguchi	Sunday Racing	1:34.3
2005	Maruka Shenck	Yuichi Fukunaga	Tsutomu Setoguchi	Kawacho Sangyo	1:37.2
2006	Osumi Daido	Yutaka Take	Tadashi Nakao	Osumi	1:34.3
2007	Captain Thule	Yuga Kawada	Hideyuki Mori	Shadai Race Horse	1:35.6
2008	Schon Wald	Yuichi Kitamura	Inao Okada	Sunday Racing	1:33.2
2009	Ridill	Futoshi Komaki	Kojiro Hashiguchi	Koji Maeda	1:33.7
2010	Reve d'Essor	Yuichi Fukunaga	Hiroyoshi Matsuda	Sunday Racing	1:33.6
2011	Clarente	Futoshi Komaki	Kojiro Hashiguchi	Shinji Maeda	1:34.9
2012	T M Inazuma	Kenichi Ikezoe	Nobuharu Fukushima	Masatsugu Takezono	1:34.7
2013	Horai Akiko	Ryuji Wada	Katsumi Minai	Kohei Hashimoto	1:33.2
2014	Tagano Espresso	Yasunari Iwata	Tadao Igarashi	Ryoji Yagi	1:35.1
2015	Air Spinel	Yutaka Take	Kazuhide Sasada	Lucky Field	1:35.9
2016	Jeune Ecole	Yuichi Fukunaga	Takayuki Yasuda	Sunday Racing	1:34.6
2017	Gendarme	Andrea Atzeni	Yasutoshi Ikee	Koji Maeda	1:36.3
2018	Admire Mars	Mirco Demuro	Yasuo Tomomichi	Riichi Maeda	1:35.4
2019	Red Bel Jour	Yutaka Take	Hideaki Fujiwara	Tokyo Horse Racing	1:34.5
2020	Red Bel Aube ^{[a]}	Yuichi Fukunaga	Hideaki Fujiwara	Tokyo Horse Racing	1:32.4
2021	Serifos ^{[a]}	Yusuke Fujioka	Mitsumasa Nakauchida	G1 Racing	1:35.1
2022	All Parfait ^{[a]}	Takuya Ono	Yuji Wada	Ryoichi Endo	1:33.2
2023	Jantar Mantar	Katsuma Sameshima	Tomokazu Takano	Shadai Race Horse	1:34.5
2024	Run for Vow	Ryusei Sakai	Yuichi Fukunaga	Yoshiro Kubota	1:34.7
2025	Admire Quads	Ryusei Sakai	Yasuo Tomomichi	Junko Kondo	1:33.1
2026	Brad Barows	Kohei Matsuyama	Haruki Sugiyama	Hirotsugu Inokuma	1:34.3

^{a} The 2020, 2021 and 2022 races took place at Hanshin Racecourse over a distance of 1,600 meters.

== Earlier winners ==
- 1966 - Yama Pit
- 1967 - Koyu
- 1968 - Fine Happy
- 1969 - Tanino Moutier
- 1970 - Shibakusa
- 1971 - Fukuryu Hikari
- 1972 - Kishu Laurel
- 1973 - Kitano Kachidoki
- 1974 - Nyr King O
- 1975 - Kitano Kaiun
- 1976 - Atair Knight
- 1977 - Bambton Court
- 1978 - Nihon Pillow Policy
- 1979 - Lafontaice
- 1980 - Sunny Ciboulette
- 1981 - Lead Eighty
- 1982 - Nihon Pillow Winner
- 1983 - Long Hayabusa
- 1984 - Tanino Bouquet
- 1985 - Yamanin Falcon
- 1986 - Dyna Thank You
- 1987 - Daitaku Longchamp
- 1988 - Idol Marie
- 1989 - Yamanin Global
- 1990 - Northern Driver
- 1991 - Nishino Flower
- 1992 - Biwa Hayahide
- 1993 - Bodyguard
- 1994 - Maxim Charade
- 1995 - Rose Colour
- 1996 - Seeking the Pearl
- 1997 - Bold Emperor
- 1998 - Eishin Cameron
- 1999 - Legend Hunter

== See also ==
- Horse racing in Japan
- List of Japanese flat horse races
