= Aichi Hai =

Aichi Hai 愛知杯
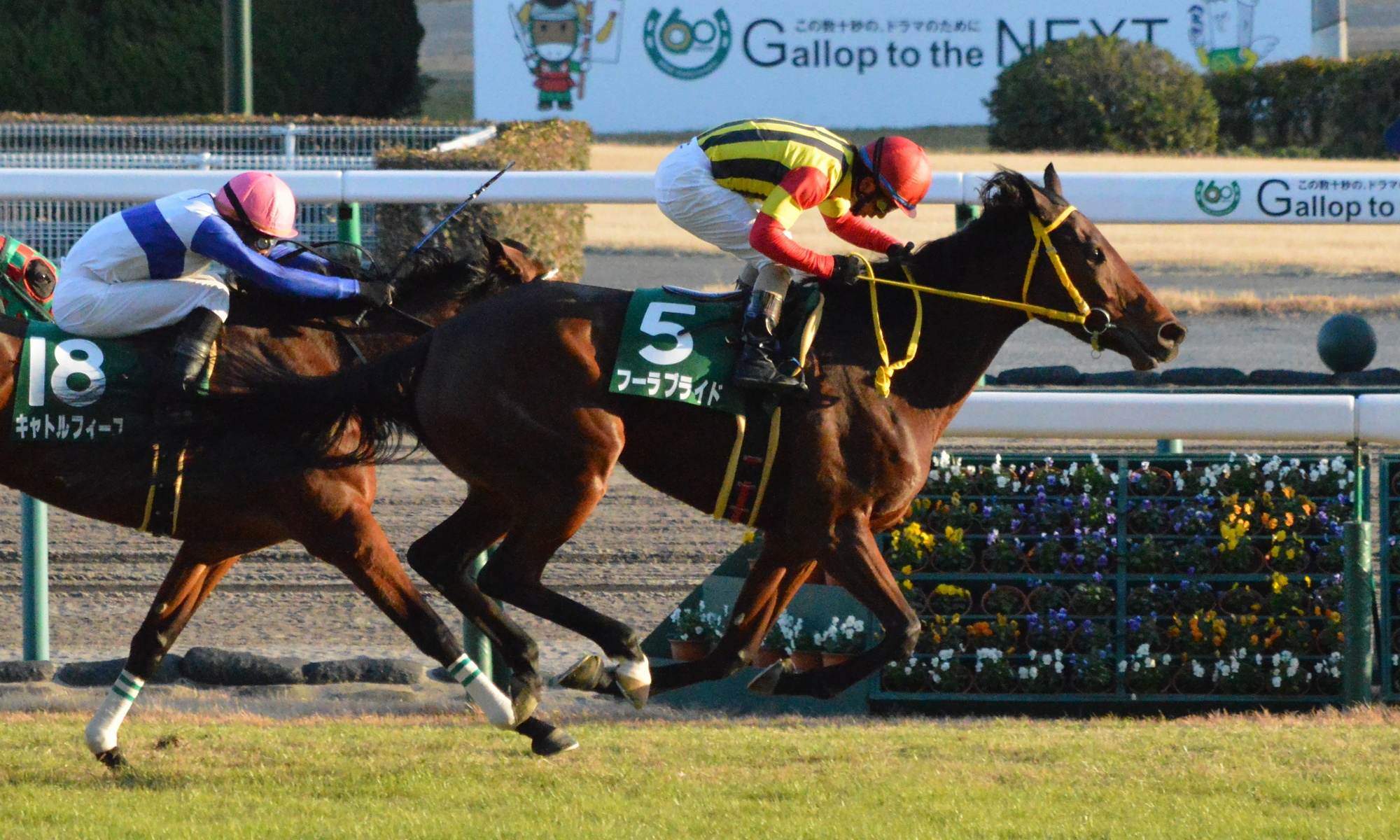
- Hula Bride wins the 2013 Aichi Hai
- Class: Grade 3
- Location: Chukyo Racecourse
- Inaugurated: 1963
- Race type: Thoroughbred Flat racing

Race information
- Distance: 1,400 meters
- Surface: Turf
- Track: Left-handed
- Qualification: 4-y-o+ fillies and mares
- Weight: Handicap
- Purse: ¥ 82,380,000 (as of 2025): 1st: ¥ 38,000,000; 2nd: ¥ 15,000,000; 3rd: ¥ 10,000,000

The Aichi Hai (Japanese 愛知杯) is a Grade 3 horse race for Thoroughbred fillies and mares aged four and over, run in March over a distance of 1,400 meters on turf at Chukyo Racecourse.

The Aichi Hai was first run in 1963 at 2,000 meters and has held Grade 3 status since 1984. The Aichi Hai was run in December until 2014 and was open to three-year-olds before being changed to January: the change meant that the race was not run in 2015. The race was open to both male and female horses up to 2003. Since 2025, the race schedule was moved from January to March and run at a distance of 1,400 meters.

== Winners since 2000 ==
Year	Winner	Age	Jockey	Trainer	Owner	Time
2000	Tunante	5	Hideaki Miyuki	Shoichi Matsumoto	Shadai Race Horse	1:58.6
2001	Grand Shinzan	7	Katsumi Ando	Masayuki Sakata	Fumiaki Motoyagi	1:59.8
2002	Tokai Pulsar	6	Minoru Yoshida	Shigeki Matsumoto	Masanori Uchimura	2:00.3
2003	Kazeni Fukarete	4	Minoru Yoshida	Shozo Sasaki	Yuichi Odagiri	1:59.7
2004	Memory Keanu	4	Shinichiro Akiyama	Sachio Yukubo	Shinzan Club	2:00.6
2005	Meine Sorceress	4	Yukio Abe	Shozo Sasaki	Thoroughbred Club Ruffian	2:01.3
2006	Admire Kiss	3	Yutaka Take	Hiroyoshi Matsuda	Riichi Kondo	1:58.6
2007	Dia De La Novia	5	Christophe Lemaire	Katsuhiko Sumii	Carrot Farm	1:58.9
2008	Seraphic Romp	4	Hokuto Miyazaki	Yoshinori Muto	Ichiro Inoue	1:59.2
2009	Little Amapola	4	Eiji Nakadate	Hiroyuki Nagahama	Shadai Race Horse	1:59.7
2010*	Seraphic Romp	6	Hokuto Miyazaki	Yoshinori Muto	Ichiro Inoue	1:59.5
2011*	Fumino Imagine	5	Keisuke Dazai	Masaru Honda	Taniji	1:59.4
2012	A Shin Memphis	4	Haruhiko Kawasu	Kenji Nonaka	Eishindo	2:03.6
2013	Hula Bride	4	Manabu Sakai	Kazuyoshi Kihara	Kazuko Yoshida	2:02.1
2014	Dia De La Madre	4	Kota Fujioka	Katsuhiko Sumii	Carrot Farm	2:04.4
2015	no race					
2016	Bounce Shasse	5	Hironobu Tanabe	Kazuo Fujisawa	Carrot Farm	1:58.8
2017	Maximum de Paris	5	Yasunari Iwata	Shigeki Matsumo	Green Farm	2:01.4
2018	Eterna Minoru	5	Hirofumi Shii	Masaru Honda	Minoru Yoshioka	2:00.1
2019	One Breath Away	6	Akihide Tsumura	Masaaki Koga	Sunday Racing	2:00.0
2020*	Denko Ange	7	Yoshitomi Shibata	Yoshiyuki Arakawa	Yasuhiro Tanaka	2:01.1
2021	Magic Castle	4	Keita Tosaki	Sakae Kunieda	Shadai Race Horse	1:58.7
2022	Ruby Casablanca	5	Yutaka Take	Naosuke Sugai	Kaneko Makoto Holdings	2:01.0
2023	Art House	4	Yuga Kawada	Mitsumasa Nakauchida	H.H. Sheikh Mohammed	2:03.1
2024*	Mikki Gorgeous	4	Yuga Kawada	Takayuki Yasuda	Mizuki Noda	1:57.9
2025	Wide Latour	4	Yuichi Kitamura	Hideaki Fujiwara	Masanobu Habata	1:20.2
2026	Ai Sansan	4	Hideaki Miyuki	Yoshitake Hashida	Koji Oka	1:19.6

* Races were run at Kokura Racecourse.

== Earlier winners ==
- 1963 - Vandal
- 1964 - Kotaro
- 1965 - Aoba
- 1966 - Paladin
- 1967 - Kabutozan
- 1968 - Race canceled
- 1969 - Glove Turf
- 1970 - Ouja
- 1971 - Three Beat
- 1972 - Shinzan Misaki
- 1973 - Silver Land
- 1974 - Silver Land
- 1975 - Ina Boles
- 1976 - Hard Lark; Tokan Takeshiba (dead heat)
- 1977 - Tokan Takeshiba
- 1978 - Hashi Kotobuki
- 1979 - Great Titan
- 1980 - Western George
- 1981 - Hiyoshi Shikainami
- 1982 - Y.M.Arrow
- 1983 - Arrow Bohemian
- 1984 - Kikuno Pegasus
- 1985 - Long Quick
- 1986 - Peter Hauler
- 1987 - Peter Hauler
- 1988 - Katsu Tokushin
- 1989 - Great Monte
- 1990 - White Arrow
- 1991 - Yamanin Seattle
- 1992 - Nuevo Tosho
- 1993 - Homare Okan
- 1994 - Tenzan Yutaka
- 1995 - Sound Barrier
- 1996 - Foundry Shori
- 1997 - Sakura Expert
- 1998 - Kanetoshi Governor
- 1999 - Bamboo Mariachi

== See also ==
- Horse racing in Japan
- List of Japanese flat horse races
