= Capella Stakes =

Japanese horse race

Capella Stakes カペラステークス
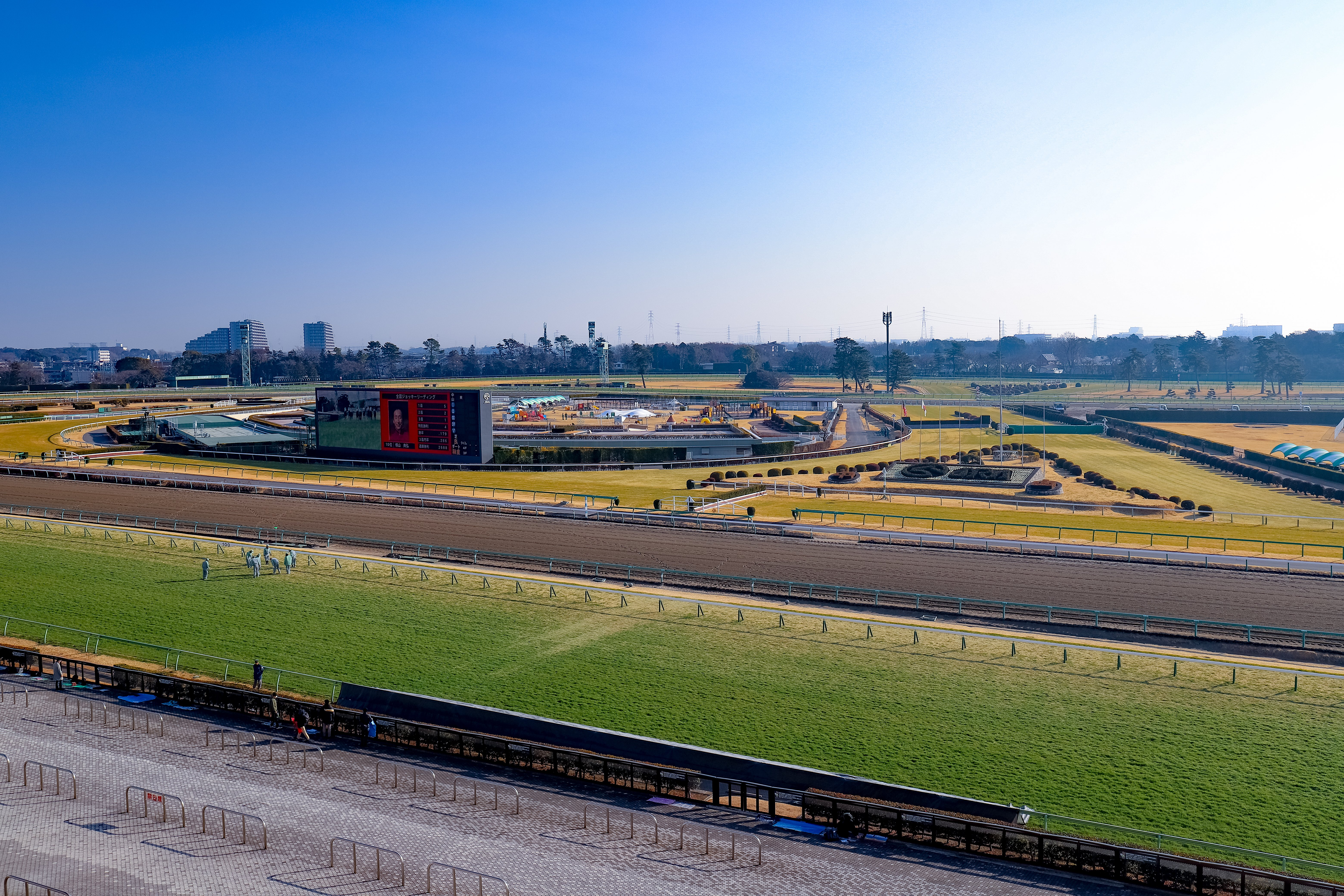
- Nakayama Racecourse
- Class: Grade 3
- Location: Nakayama Racecourse
- Inaugurated: 2008
- Race type: Thoroughbred Flat racing

Race information
- Distance: 1200 metres
- Surface: Dirt
- Track: Right-handed
- Qualification: 3-y-o+
- Weight: Special Weight
- Purse: ¥ 82,380,000 (as of 2025): 1st: ¥ 38,000,000; 2nd: ¥ 15,000,000; 3rd: ¥ 10,000,000

The Capella Stakes (Japanese カペラステークス) is a Grade 3 horse race in Japan for Thoroughbreds aged three and above. Organized by the Japan Racing Association, it is run in December over a distance of 1200 metres on dirt at Nakayama Racecourse.

The race was first run in 2008 and has held Grade 3 status since 2009.

== Weight ==
56 kg for three-year-olds, 57 kg for four-year-olds and above.

Allowances:

- 2 kg for fillies / mares
- 1 kg for southern hemisphere bred three-year-olds

Penalties (excluding two-year-old race performance):

- If a graded stakes race has been won within a year:
  - 3 kg for a grade 1 win (2 kg for fillies / mares)
  - 2 kg for a grade 2 win (1 kg for fillies / mares)
  - 1 kg for a grade 3 win
- If a graded stakes race has been won for more than a year:
  - 2 kg for a grade 1 win (1 kg for fillies / mares)
  - 1 kg for a grade 2 win

== Winners since 2008 ==
| Year | Winner | Age | Jockey | Trainer | Owner | Time |
|---|---|---|---|---|---|---|
| 2008 | Victory Tetsuni | 4 | Norihiro Yokoyama | Hideyuki Mori | Yoshinori Sakae | 1:08.7 |
| 2009 | Million Disk | 5 | Issei Murata | Yoshiyuki Arakawa | Shadai Race Horse | 1:09.6 |
| 2010 | Sei Crimson | 4 | Hideaki Miyuki | Toshiyuki Hattori | Seiki Kaneda | 1:09.7 |
| 2011 | Keiai Gerbera | 5 | Shinichiro Akiyama | Osamu Hirata | Keiai Orthopedic Appliance Co., Ltd. | 1:09.1 |
| 2012 | Silk Fortune | 6 | Norihiro Yokoyama | Norio Fujisawa | Silk | 1:10.8 |
| 2013 | Northern River | 5 | Yoshitomi Shibata | Hidekazu Asami | Masamichi Hayashi | 1:10.7 |
| 2014 | Danon Legend | 4 | Kyosuke Maruta | Akira Murayama | Danox | 1:09.5 |
| 2015 | Kikuno Storm | 6 | Hiroyuki Uchida | Naohiro Yoshida | Goro Kikuchi | 1:09.7 |
| 2016 | Nobo Baccara | 4 | Hiroyuki Uchida | Shoichi Temma | LS.M | 1:10.2 |
| 2017 | Dios Corrida | 3 | Akihide Tsumura | Yoshitada Takahashi | Shoji Nojima | 1:11.0 |
| 2018 | Copano Kicking | 3 | Daichi Shibata | Akira Murayama | Sachiaki Kobayashi | 1:10.2 |
| 2019 | Copano Kicking | 4 | Nanako Fujita | Akira Murayama | Sachiaki Kobayashi | 1:09.3 |
| 2020 | Justin | 4 | Ryusei Sakai | Yoshito Yahagi | Yoshio Oda | 1:09.8 |
| 2021 | Dancing Prince | 5 | Kousei Miura | Keisuke Miyata | Chizu Yoshida | 1:09.5 |
| 2022 | Remake | 3 | Yuichi Fukunaga | Koichi Shintani | Koji Maeda | 1:08.9 |
| 2023 | T M Tokkyu | 5 | Akihide Tsumura | Kazuyoshi Kihara | Masatsugu Takezono | 1:09.3 |
| 2024 | Gabby's Sister | 3 | Hayato Yoshida | Kazutomo Mori | Kazuhiko Nagashima | 1:10.1 |
| 2025 | T O Elvis | 3 | Katsuma Sameshima | Daisuke Takayanagi | Tomoya Ozasa | 1:08.6 |

== See also ==
- Horse racing in Japan
- List of Japanese flat horse races
