= Churchill Downs Cup =

Horse race in Japan

Churchill Downs Cup チャーチルダウンズカップ
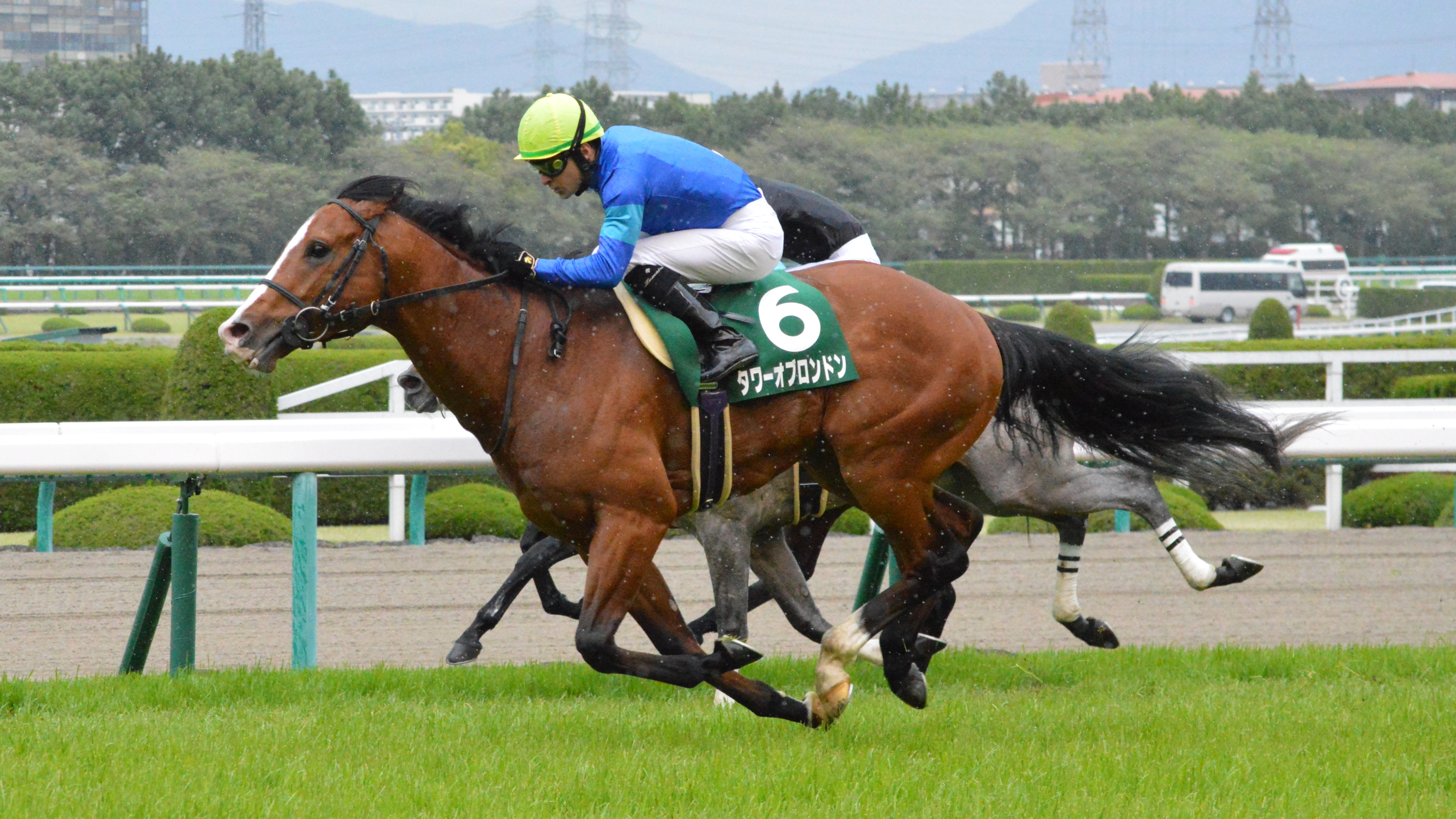
- 2018 winner Tower of London
- Class: Grade 3
- Location: Hanshin Racecourse
- Inaugurated: 1992
- Race type: Thoroughbred Flat racing

Race information
- Distance: 1600 metres
- Surface: Turf
- Track: Right-handed
- Qualification: 3-y-o
- Weight: 57 kg Allowance: Fillies 2 kg
- Purse: ¥ 87,960,000 (as of 2025): 1st: ¥ 41,000,000; 2nd: ¥ 16,000,000; 3rd: ¥ 10,000,000

The Churchill Downs Cup (Japanese: チャーチルダウンズカップ) is a Grade 3 horse race organized annually by the Japan Racing Association (JRA) for three-year-old Thoroughbreds. It is run in April over a distance of 1600 metres at Hanshin Racecourse.

The race was first run in 1992 and has held Grade 3 status ever since. It serves as a trial race for the NHK Mile Cup. Past winners of the race have included Eishin Preston, Tanino Gimlet, Just A Way and Mikki Isle. Formerly named Arlington Cup, it was renamed to Churchill Downs Cup in 2025.

== Past winners ==
Year	Winner	Jockey	Trainer	Owner	Time
1992	El Casa River	Taisei Yamada	Ryohei Tanaka	Crear	1:37.5
1993	Grand Shingeki	Yukihiro Doi	Ichizo Iwamoto	Mitsugu Tsurumoto	1:38.3
1994	Merci Stage	Toru Kawakita	Yukihau Ono	Yasuo Nagai	1:42.9
1995	Eishin Berlin	Katsumi Minai	Masanori Sakaguchi	Toyomitsu Hirai	1:34.3
1996	Sugino Hayakaze	Hirokazu Tajima	Yukiharu Shikato	Yoshio Sugie	1:33.9
1997	Brave Tender	Mikio Matsunaga	Yasuo Ikee	Koji Maeda	1:36.1
1998	Dublin Lion	Olivier Peslier	Hidetaka Tadokoro	Seisuke Hata	1:34.6
1999	Eishin Cameron	Yutaka Take	Masanori Sakaguchi	Toyomitsu Hirai	1:35.8
2000	Eishin Preston	Yuichi Fukunaga	Shuji Kitahashi	Toyomitsu Hirai	1:35.7
2001	Dantsu Flame	Yutaka Take	Kenji Yamauchi	Tetsuji Yamaji	1:37.9
2002	Tanino Gimlet	Yutaka Take	Kunihide Mastura	Yuzo Tanimizu	1:33.9
2003	Win Kluger	Koshiro Take	Shigeki Matsumoto	Win	1:36.8
2004	Seeking The Dia	Yutaka Take	Hideyuki Mori	Yoichi Aoyama	1:35.8
2005	Big Planet	Yutaka Take	Katsumi Minai	Big	1:34.3
2006	Suteki Shinsukesun	Olivier Peslier	Hideyuki Mori	Yoshinori Sakae	1:34.7
2007	Tosen Captain	Hirofumi Shii	Toshifumi Nakajima	Takaya Shimakawa	1:33.9
2008	Dantsu Kissui	Shinji Fujita	Masaru Honda	Tetsuji Yamamoto	1:34.6
2009	Double Wedge	Futoshi Komaki	Masayuki Kawashima	Tomio Fukami	1:35.6
2010	Cosmo Sensor	Shu Ishibashi	Masato Nishizono	Big Red Farm	1:34.8
2011	Northern River	Yutaka Take	Hidekazu Asami	Masamichi Hayashi	1:34.2
2012	Just A Way	Yuichi Fukunaga	Naosuke Sugai	Akatsuki Yamatoya	1:36.3
2013	Copano Richard	William Buick	Toru Miya	Sachiaki Kobayashi	1:34.8
2014	Mikki Isle	Suguru Hamanaka	Hidetaka Otonashi	Mizuki Noda	1:34.0
2015	Young Man Power	Masami Matsuoka	Takahisa Tezuka	Juichi Hoshino	1:35.9
2016	Rainbow Line	Mirco Demuro	Hidekazu Asami	Masahiro Mita	1:34.1
2017	Persian Knight	Mirco Demuro	Yasutoshi Ikee	G1 Racing	1:34.1
2018	Tower of London	Christophe Lemaire	Kazuo Fujisawa	Godolphin	1:33.4
2019	Iberis ^{[a]}	Suguru Hamanaka	Koichi Tsunoda	Koji Maeda	1:34.2
2020	Taisei Vision	Shu Ishibashi	Masayuki Nishimura	Seiho Tanaka	1:34.3
2021	Ho O Amazon	Yuga Kawada	Yoshito Yahagi	Yoshio Kozasa	1:34.2
2022	Danon Scorpion	Yuga Kawada	Takayuki Yasuda	Danox	1:32.7
2023	Obamburumai	Yutaka Take	Keiji Yoshimura	Koji Oka	1:33.9
2024	Di Speranza	João Moreira	Tatsuya Yoshioka	Turf Sports	1:34.1
2025	Lance of Chaos	Seinosuke Yoshimura	Yutaka Okumura	Yoshinori Itsukage	1:32.2
2026	Ask Ikigomi	Ryusei Sakai	Hideaki Fujiwara	Hirosaki Toshihiro Holdings	1:34.1

^{a} The 2019 winner Iberis was a filly.

== See also ==
- Horse racing in Japan
- List of Japanese flat horse races
