= Embroidery (horse) =

Japanese racehorse

Embroidery エンブロイダリー
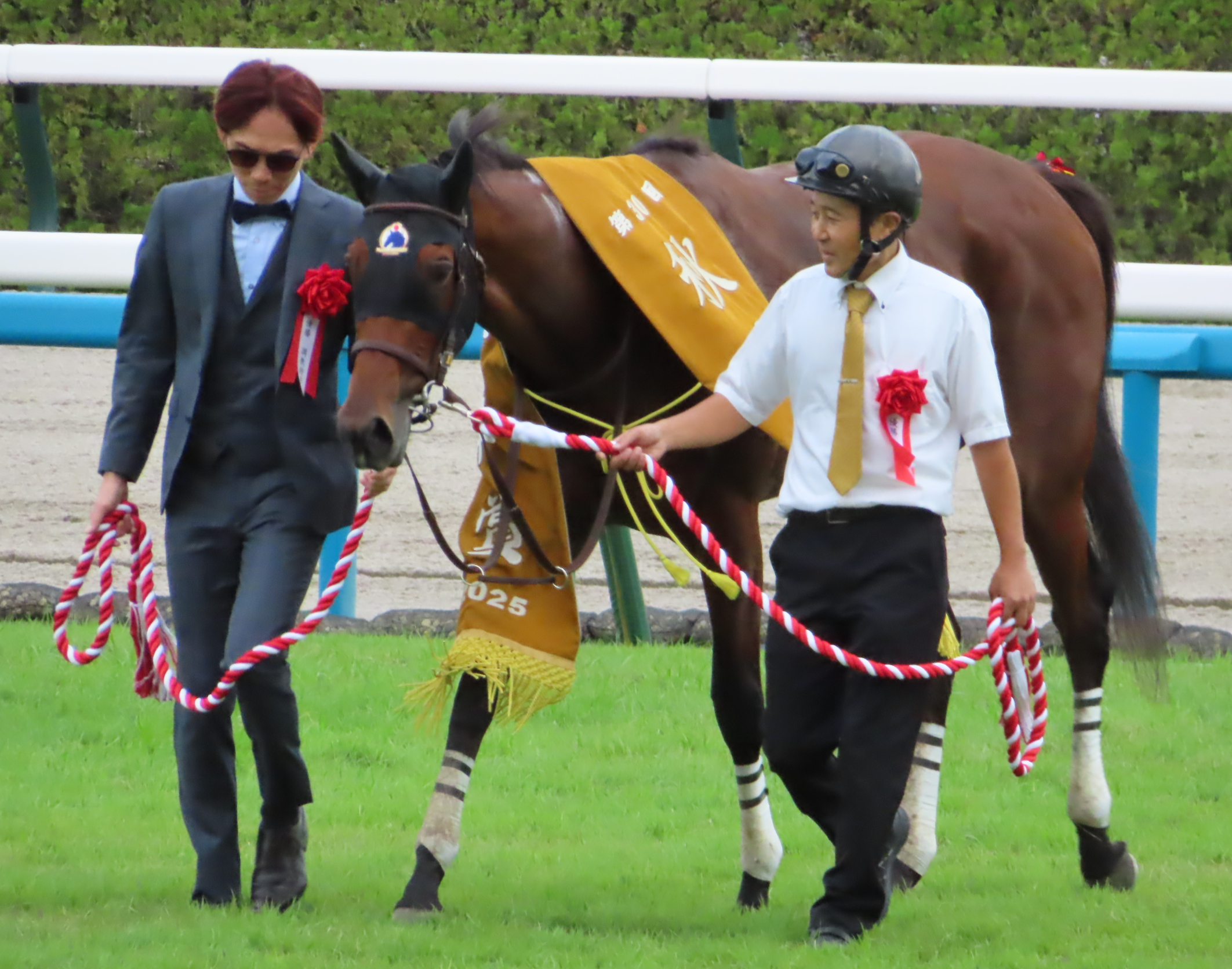
- 2025 Shuka Sho
- Sire: Admire Mars
- Grandsire: Daiwa Major
- Dam: Rottenmeier
- Damsire: Kurofune
- Sex: Filly
- Foaled: February 1, 2022 (age 4)
- Country: Japan
- Color: Bay
- Breeder: Northern Farm
- Owner: Silk Racing
- Racing colours
- Trainer: Kazutomo Mori
- Jockey: Christophe Lemaire
- Record: 12: 7-2-0
- Earnings: 620,903,000 JPY

Major wins
- Queen Cup (2025); Hanshin Himba Stakes (2026); Victoria Mile (2026); Japanese Classic Tiara Race wins: Oka Sho (2025); Shūka Sho (2025)

Awards
- JRA Award for Best Three-Year-Old Filly (2025)
- Last updated on November 22, 2026

Embroidery (Japanese: エンブロイダリー, Hepburn: Enburoidarī; foaled February 1, 2022) is an active Japanese Thoroughbred racehorse best known for winning the 2025 Oka Sho, 2025 Shūka Sho, and 2026 Victoria Mile. At the end of her 2025 season, she was awarded the JRA Award for Best Three-Year-Old Filly.

== Racing career ==
=== 2024: two-year-old season ===
Embroidery debuted on June 2, 2024, in a 2-year-old maiden race at Tokyo Racecourse over a distance of 1,600 meters. Closing sharply along the rail in the stretch, she narrowly lost by half a length to Million Rose, finishing second. Her next start came in a 2-year-old maiden race at Niigata Racecourse on July 27. Breaking sharply to take the lead, she dictated a slow pace before accelerating in the stretch to win by 7 lengths, securing her maiden victory in a record time of 1:45.5, breaking Niigata’s previous 1,800 meter turf course record for two-year-olds by 0.9 seconds. On September 29, she started as the favorite in the Saffron Sho but finished 5th after a slow start. She rebounded on November 16 in a 2yo 1-win class race, claiming her second career victory.

=== 2025: three-year-old season ===
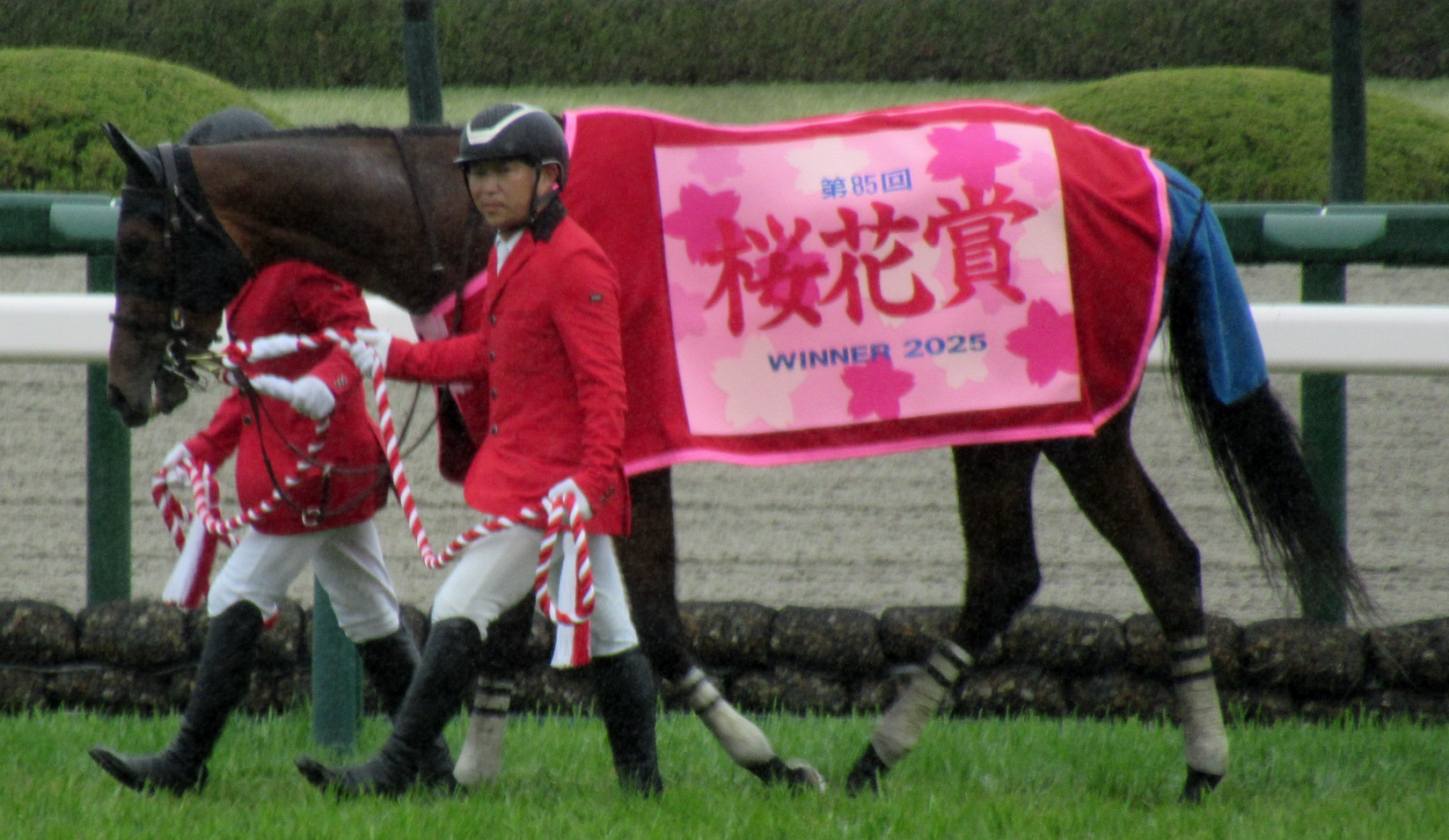
Embroidery at the Oka Sho

Embroidery opened her 3-year-old campaign in the Queen Cup on February 15, marking her graded stakes debut. Tracking second early, she surged clear in the stretch to win by two-and-a-half horse lengths in a race-record time of 1:32.2. This victory also made her the first graded stakes winner sired by Admire Mars.

On April 13, she contested the Oka Sho (Japanese 1000 Guineas) at Hanshin Racecourse. Racing mid-pack, she threaded through traffic in the stretch to win decisively, securing her first grade 1 title and extending her graded stakes winning streak. Notably, Admire Mars, a first-year sire with his first crop of foals, became the first freshman stallion since Epiphaneia (sire of Daring Tact, 2020 Oka Sho winner) to produce a Japanese classic winner.

Following her Oka Sho triumph, Embroidery was sent to Northern Farm Tennei for a brief rest. On April 25, her owners, Silk Racing, announced via their official website that she would target the Yushun Himba (Japanese Oaks) at Tokyo Racecourse on May 25. At the race, Embroidery who came as the first favourite, could not see the distance well, hit the wall and stalled at ninth position.

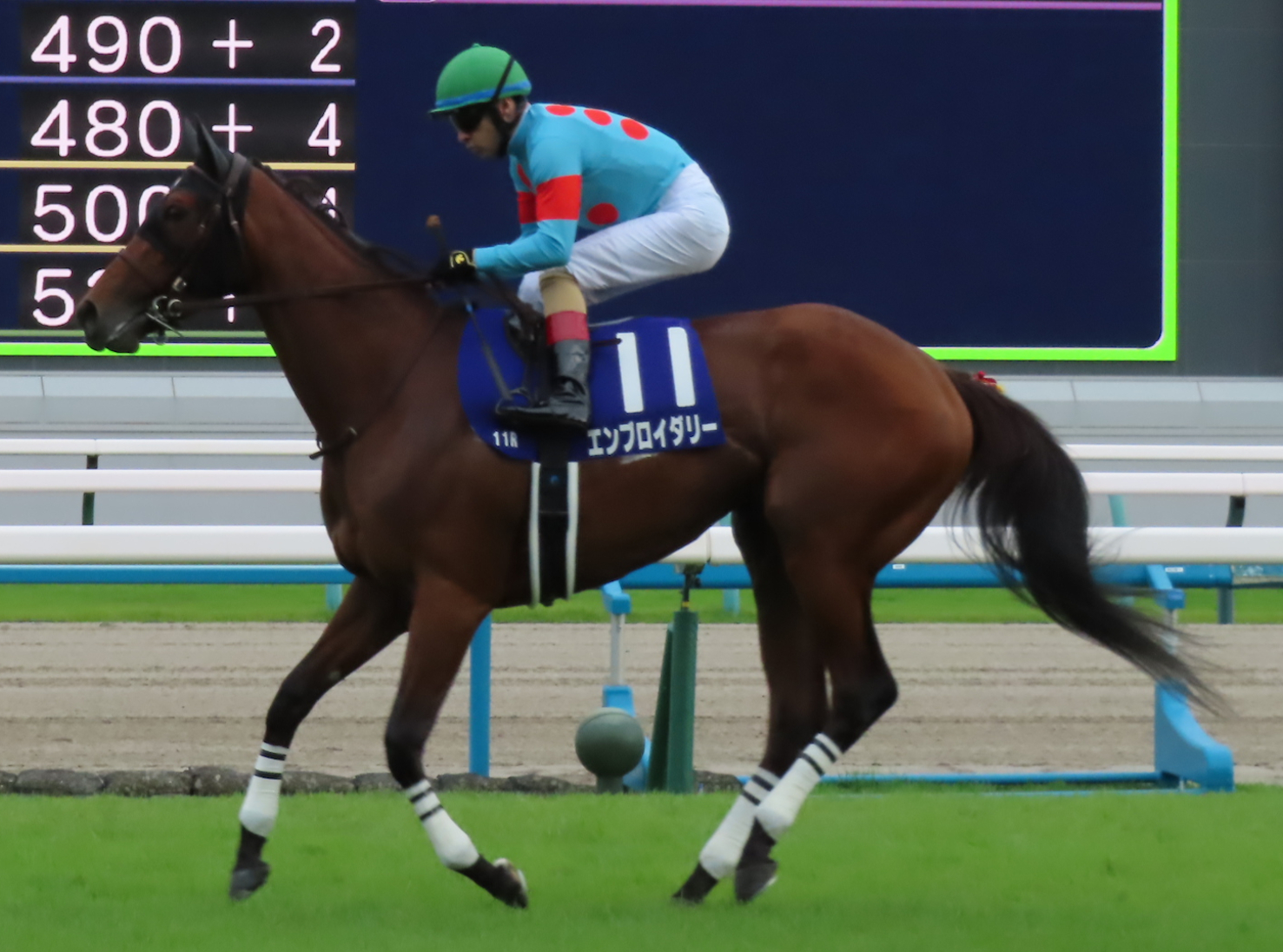
Embroidery before the Shuka Sho

Later on this year, Embroidery's next race was decided to be the Shuka Sho in Kyoto. The race was held on October 19. When the race start, Embroidery settled out early and held on to the second place before finally putting her foot down and passing Erika Express, who was jockeyed by Yutaka Take, on the final straight and took home her second tiara. Embroidery closed her year with a run at the Hong Kong Mile in Sha Tin but as she move outside from the middle pack and fade away from two furlong out, she ended up in eleventh-place five and three-quarters length behind Voyage Bubble who won the race.

=== 2026: four-year-old season ===
Embroidery started this season with a run back at the Hanshin Himba Stakes on April. Her trainer, Mori claimed that although Embroidery speed during training is not especially fast, she finished it with something in hand. He also said that she came back physically stronger now and more complete than before. This claimed was proven on the race day as she started strong from the gate, took the lead and held on to it until the finish line. She won the race by a neck over the last year Oaks winner, Kamunyak. Two months later, she ran at the Victoria Mile. From the start, Embroidery broke well from stall 12 and eased back her pace at the sixth position behind the pack which was led by Erika Express. Racing wide around the corners, she advanced steadily up the hill in the early stretch and after taking the lead at the 200 metre marker, Embroidery accelerated to the front strongly and easily pulled away for a comfortable one-and-a-quarter-length victory over Kamunyak in second race in a row. Lemaire said that he felt the horse's response was strong enough after climbing the hill which ensuring that the win was in their hands. He further noted that Embroidery was calm and well prepared for the race from the barrier until finish.

== Racing statistics ==
Below data is based on data available on JBIS Search, and NetKeiba.

Date	Track	Race	Grade	Distance (Condition)	Entry	HN	Odds (Favored)	Finish	Time	Margins	Jockey	Winner (Runner-up)
2024 – two-year-old season
Jun 2	Tokyo	2YO Debut		1,600 m (Good)	12	4	2.5 (1)	2nd	1:36.5	0.1	João Moreira	Million Rose
Jul 27	Niigata	2YO Maiden		1,800 m (Firm)	6	3	1.1 (1)	1st	R1:45.5 (Note: Broke the two-year-old track record)	-1.2	Christophe Lemaire	(Agnes Sanki)
Sep 29	Nakayama	Saffron Sho	1 Win	1,600 m (Firm)	9	6	1.2 (1)	5th	1:35.3	0.1	Christophe Lemaire	Kurino Mei
Nov 16	Tokyo	2YO 1WIN	1 Win	1,400 m (Firm)	10	8	1.7 (1)	1st	1:22.7	-0.2	Christophe Lemaire	(Bonne Soiree)
2025 – three-year-old season
Feb 15	Tokyo	Queen Cup	GIII	1,600 m (Firm)	14	7	4.9 (3)	1st	R1:32.2 (Note: Broke the race record)	-0.4	Christophe Lemaire	(Ma Puce)
Apr 13	Hanshin	Oka Sho	GI	1,600 m (Good)	18	7	5.0 (3)	1st	1:33.1	0.0	João Moreira	(Arma Veloce)
May 25	Tokyo	Yushun Himba	GI	2,400 m (Firm)	18	9	3.3 (1)	9th	2:26.7	1.0	Christophe Lemaire	Kamunyak
Oct 19	Kyoto	Shūka Sho	GI	2,000 m (Firm)	18	11	5.5 (2)	1st	1:58.3	-0.1	Christophe Lemaire	(Erika Express)
Dec 14	Sha Tin	Hong Kong Mile	GI	1,600 m (Good)	14	14	7.2 (4)	11th	1:34.30	0.87	Christophe Lemaire	Voyage Bubble
2026 – four-year-old season
Apr 11	Hanshin	Hanshin Himba Stakes	GII	1,600 m (Firm)	10	1	2.8 (1)	1st	R1:31.6 (Note: Broke the race record (since reinstatement to 1600 metres))	0.0	Christophe Lemaire	(Kamunyak)
May 17	Tokyo	Victoria Mile	GI	1,600 m (Firm)	18	12	1.9 (1)	1st	1:30.9	-0.2	Christophe Lemaire	(Kamunyak)
Nov 22	Kyoto	Mile Championship	GI	1,600 m (Firm)	18	2	5.7 (3)	2nd	1:31.9	0.1	Christophe Lemaire	Erdenali

Legend:
Turf

== Pedigree ==
Pedigree of Embroidery (JPN), bay filly, 2022
Sire Admire Mars ch. 2016	Daiwa Major ch. 2001	Sunday Silence (USA)	Halo
Sire Admire Mars ch. 2016	Daiwa Major ch. 2001	Sunday Silence (USA)	Wishing Well
Sire Admire Mars ch. 2016	Daiwa Major ch. 2001	Scarlet Bouquet	Northern Taste (CAN)
Sire Admire Mars ch. 2016	Daiwa Major ch. 2001	Scarlet Bouquet	Scarlet Ink (USA)
Sire Admire Mars ch. 2016	Via Medici (IRE) ch. 2007	Medicean (GB)	Machiavellian (USA)
Sire Admire Mars ch. 2016	Via Medici (IRE) ch. 2007	Medicean (GB)	Mystic Goddess (USA)
Sire Admire Mars ch. 2016	Via Medici (IRE) ch. 2007	Via Milano (FR)	Singspiel (IRE)
Sire Admire Mars ch. 2016	Via Medici (IRE) ch. 2007	Via Milano (FR)	Salvinaxia
Dam Rottenmeier b. 2013	Kurofune (USA) gr. 1998	French Deputy	Deputy Minister
Dam Rottenmeier b. 2013	Kurofune (USA) gr. 1998	French Deputy	Mitterand
Dam Rottenmeier b. 2013	Kurofune (USA) gr. 1998	Blue Avenue	Classic Go Go
Dam Rottenmeier b. 2013	Kurofune (USA) gr. 1998	Blue Avenue	Eliza Blue
Dam Rottenmeier b. 2013	Adelheid b. 2007	Agnes Tachyon	Sunday Silence (USA)
Dam Rottenmeier b. 2013	Adelheid b. 2007	Agnes Tachyon	Agnes Flora
Dam Rottenmeier b. 2013	Adelheid b. 2007	Biwa Heidi	Caerleon (USA)
Dam Rottenmeier b. 2013	Adelheid b. 2007	Biwa Heidi	Aghsan (IRE) (Family: 16-c)

- Her dam, Rottenmeier, won the Wasurenagusa Sho in 2016, she also finished third in the Daily Hai Queen Cup that same year.
- Her great granddam, Biwa Heidi, won the 1995 Hanshin Sansai Himba Stakes.
- Her granddam, Adelheid, is a full sister to Admire Aura, half sister to Admire Japan, Buena Vista, Tosen Reve, Joie de Vivre and Sangreal.
