= Biwa Heidi =

Japanese Thoroughbred racehorse

Biwa Heidi ビワハイジ
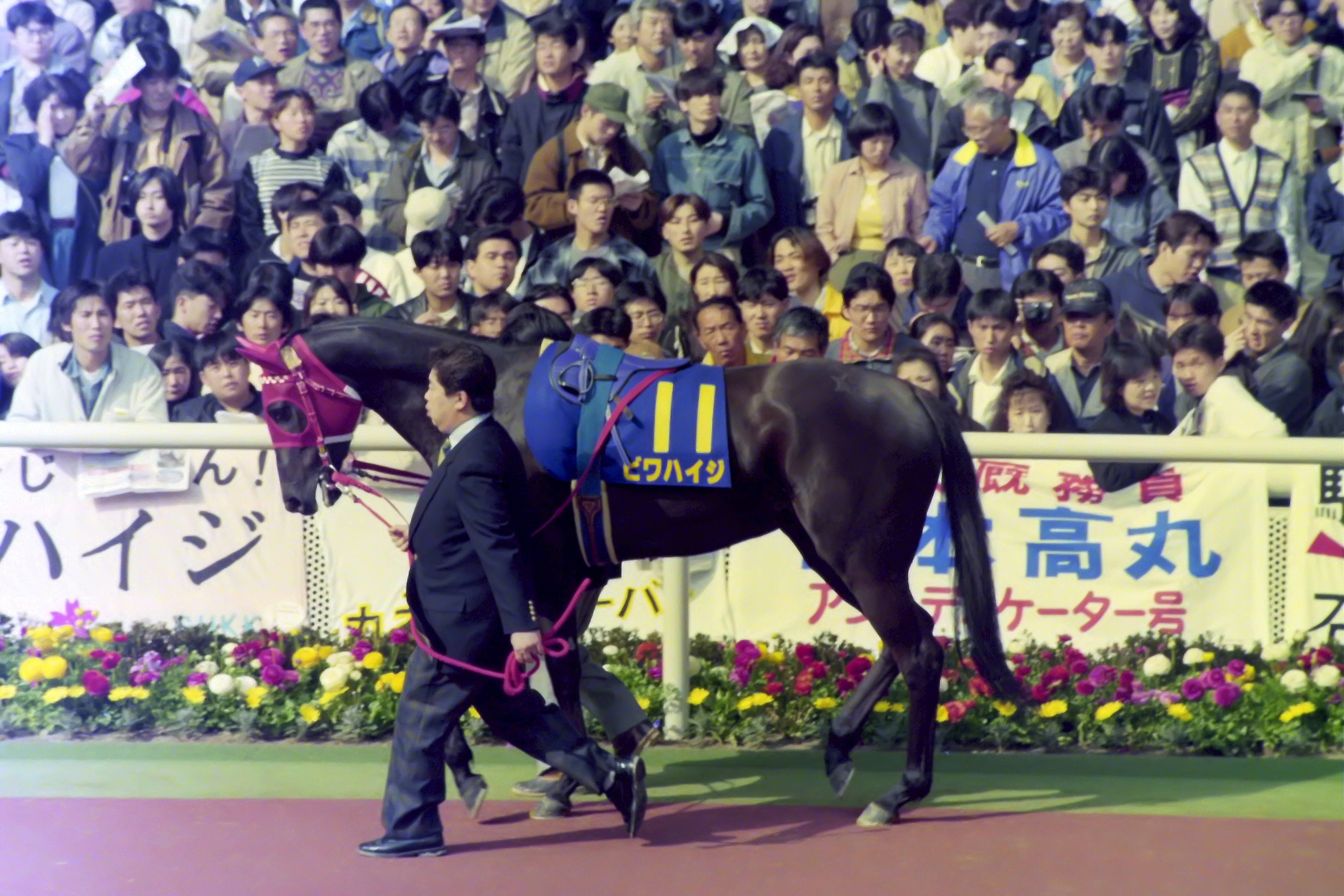
- Biwa Heidi at the 1996 Oka Sho
- Breed: Thoroughbred
- Sire: Caerleon
- Grandsire: Nijinsky
- Dam: Aghsan
- Damsire: Lord Gayle
- Sex: Mare
- Foaled: 7 March 1993
- Died: 25 February 2022 (aged 28)
- Country: Japan
- Colour: Dark bay/Brown
- Breeder: Hayata Farms
- Owner: Biwa co.ltd
- Racing colours: →
- Trainer: Mitsumasa Hamada
- Jockey: Koichi Tsunoda; Olivier Peslier
- Record: 10: 4-1-0
- Earnings: 153,280,000 JPY

Major wins
- Sapporo Sansai Stakes (1995); Hanshin Sansai Stakes (1995); Kyoto Himba Stakes (1998)

Awards
- JRA Award for Best Three-Year-Old Filly (1995)

Honours
- IFHA International Protected Names (broodmares)

Biwa Heidi (Japanese ビワハイジ, Hepburn: Biwa Haiji; 7 March 1993 – 25 February 2022) was a Japanese thoroughbred racehorse and a prolific broodmare. In her racing career, she won the 1995 Hanshin Sansai Stakes, famously beating future Horse of the Year, Air Groove by a half length. After retiring from racing, she would also be known as a prolific broodmare, foaling six graded race winners; most notably Buena Vista and Joie de Vivre.

With her success as a broodmare, her name is designated as an internationally protected name by the International Federation of Horseracing Authorities.

== Background ==
Biwa Heidi was foaled out of Aghsan by Lord Gayle who was an Irish broodmare that was purchased and brought into Japan by Koichiro Hayata (Hayata Farms owner). During the transfer, She was already pregnant with her, sired by Caerleon and moved to the Hayata Farms in Niikappu, Hokkaido where she was born.

Her future trainer, Mitsumasa Hamada then convinced his friend, Isamu Nakajima who was the president of Biwa co.ltd. to purchase her from Hayata Farms who also at the time owned 1993 Japanese Horse of the Year, Biwa Hayahide. Her name was the combination of the stable crown name Biwa and Heidi which was a tribute to a Japanese animated series, Heidi, Girl of the Alps.

== Racing career ==
Biwa Heidi ran in a maiden race (1000 meters on turf) at Sapporo Racecourse on 10 June 1995. Yutaka Take rode her in the first maiden race of the 1993-foaled generation, and she was the 1.5-to-1 favorite. She took the lead and made a move from the outside in the straight, beating two other horses that were closing in from the inside and outside by half a length to claim her first victory. One month later, on 30 July, she was the third favourite in her first-ever graded race start, which was the Sapporo Sansai Stakes, a G3 race. She took the lead from the start, drew level with the leader at the final corner, and then widened the gap to cross the finish line first. She won her first graded stakes race by three and a half lengths. Following her victory, she took a break, gained some weights and returned to racing four months later at the Hanshin Sansai Stakes. In this race, she was being assigned to a new jockey, Koichi Tsunoda. In this race, Tsunoda propelled Biwa Heidi to lead the race from wire-to-wire and finished first at the line by a half length lead against Air Groove. This was her first G1 race win and she was undefeated in three starts so far. At the end of the year, she was awarded the JRA Award for Best Three-Year-Old Filly by the Japan Racing Association.

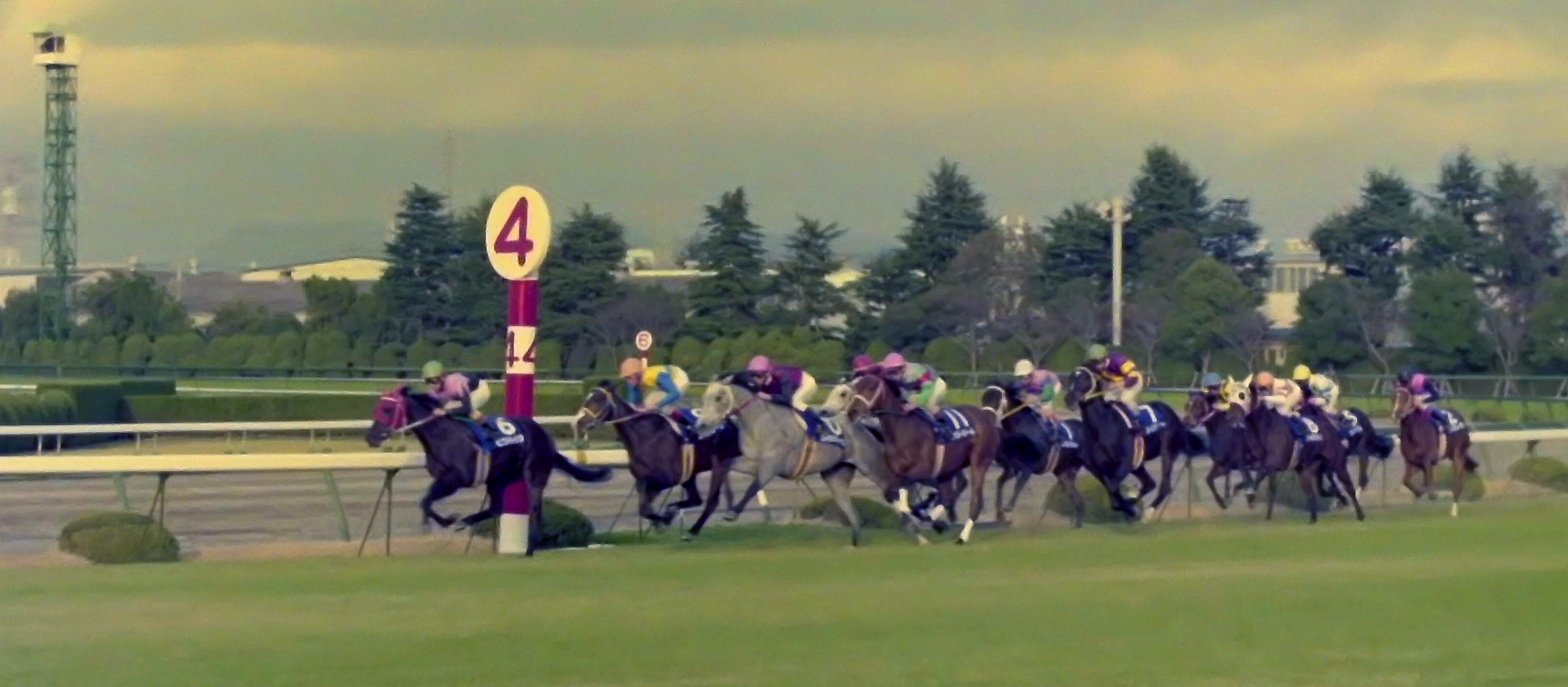
Biwa Heidi (purple silks, green helmet) leading the 47th Hanshin Sansai Stakes and closely chased by Air Groove (yellow silks, blue sleeves, orange helmet)

In 1996, Biwa Heidi and Air Groove battled out again in the Tulip Sho. This time, Biwa Heidi was the favourite at 2.3 odds whilst Air Groove was the second favourite at 2.7 odds. Mirroring the previous start, Biwa Heidi took the lead early on but Olivier Peslier, who replaced Michael Kinane on Air Groove this time, swept around the outside at the third corner, overtook Biwa Heidi and bursted forward to win the race by a five lengths margin. On 4th of April, Biwa Heidi ran in the Oka Sho and became the heavy favourite after a last-minute withdrawal by Air Groove, who had caught a cold. Unfortunately, she also had gone through molting and estrus just before the race but continued to run despite being in poor health. She took a short lead before falling down the pecking order and ended up in 15th-place. Her owner, Nakajima, pushed her to run in the Tokyo Yushun next instead of Yushun Himba due to his regret of watching Biwa Hayahide finished in second place behind Winning Ticket in 1993, the decision which was opposed fiercely by Hamada. She ran poorly, finished in 13th place and suffered a fracture that subsided her for the rest of the year.

She returned to racing in October 1997, but the year proved unfruitful for her as she placed outside of the podium in all of her three starts that year. She continued racing in 1998 at the Kyoto Himba Stakes with the same jockey that beat her at the Tulip Sho; Olivier Peslier. Starting from the far outside gate, she took the lead and ran away with the race, entering the straight without needing to use the whip and crossing the finish line first. She won by two lengths, her first victory in two years and her third graded stakes win. However, she suffered a bone spur in her left foreleg after the race, which ended her career as a racehorse.

== Racing form ==
Biwa Heidi won four races in ten starts. This data is available based on JBIS and netkeiba.

Date	Track	Race	Grade	Distance (Condition)	Entry	HN	Odds (Favored)	Finish	Time	Margins	Jockey	Winner (Runner-up)
1995 – two-year-old season
Jun 10	Sapporo	2yo Debut		1,000 m (Firm)	9	4	1.5 (1)	1st	0:58.8	–0.1	Yutaka Take	(Cobalt Wind)
Jul 30	Sapporo	Sapporo Sansai Stakes	3	1,200 m (Good)	15	5	6.1 (3)	1st	1:12.0	–0.6	Yutaka Take	(Kiss Pasion)
Dec 3	Hanshin	Hanshin Sansai Stakes	1	1,600 m (Firm)	11	6	8.7 (4)	1st	1:35.3	–0.1	Koichi Tsunoda	(Air Groove)
1996 – three-year-old season
Mar 2	Hanshin	Tulip Sho	3	1,600 m (Good)	14	14	2.3 (1)	2nd	1:35.0	0.8	Koichi Tsunoda	Air Groove
Apr 7	Hanshin	Oka Sho	1	1,600 m (Firm)	18	11	4.8 (2)	15th	1:37.0	2.6	Koichi Tsunoda	Fight Gulliver
Jun 3	Tokyo	Tokyo Yushun	1	2,400 m (Firm)	17	14	71.8 (10)	13th	2:27.9	1.9	Koichi Tsunoda	Fusaichi Concorde
1997 – four-year-old season
Oct 18	Kyoto	Cassiopeia Stakes	OP	2,000 m (Firm)	8	4	9.6 (5)	5th	2:01.4	0.7	Koichi Tsunoda	Yutosei
Nov 9	Kyoto	Queen Elizabeth II Cup	1	2,200 m (Firm)	15	9	23.0 (5)	7th	2:12.9	0.4	Koichi Tsunoda	Erimo Chic
Dec 14	Hanshin	Hanshin Himba Stakes	2	1,600 m (Firm)	16	16	8.9 (4)	7th	1:35.1	0.6	Koichi Tsunoda	Air Wings
1998 – five-year-old season
Jan 31	Kyoto	Kyoto Himba Stakes	3	1,600 m (Firm)	13	13	3.8 (3)	1st	1:34.7	–0.3	Olivier Peslier	(Run for the Dream)

Legend:
Turf

== Broodmare career and death ==
At first, she was a broodmare at the Hayata Farm. However, due to Hayata Farm declaring bankruptcy, as well as her owner's death, all of the horses Nakajima owned including Biwa Heidi were moved into Northern Farm, coordinated by Katsumi Yoshida.

=== Breeding record ===
Biwa Heidi mated in 18 attempts and produced 12 foals. Six of them were graded race winners.
Bold: Grade 1 winner progeny

Foal Number	Name	Date of Birth	Sex	Color	Sire	Owner	Trainer	Record	Ref
1	Biwa World	2 May 1999	Gelding	Bay	Brian's Time	Biwa co. ltd.	Mitsumasa Hamada (Ritto)	24: 3-5-8	
	Unfertilized				Sunday Silence				
2	Fine Cela	12 March 2001	Mare	Brown	Sunday Silence	Kazumi Yoshida	Takashi Kubota (Miho)	15: 6-2-2	
3	Admire Japan	16 April 2002	Stallion	Chestnut	Sunday Silence	Riichi Kondo	Hiroyoshi Matsuda (Ritto)	10: 2-2-2; Graded Wins: 2005 Keisei Hai	
	Unfertilized				Brian's Time				
4	Admire Aura	19 February 2004	Stallion	Bay	Agnes Tachyon	Riichi Kondo	Hiroyoshi Matsuda (Ritto)	16: 4-2-3; Graded Wins: 2007 Shinzan Kinen; 2008 Yayoi Sho; 2008 Kyoto Kinen	
5	Admire Tenka	25 February 2005	Stallion	Bay	Agnes Tachyon	Riichi Kondo	Hiroyoshi Matsuda (Ritto)	unraced	
6	**Buena Vista**	14 March 2006	Mare	Dark Bay	Special Week	Sunday Racing	Hiroyoshi Matsuda (Ritto)	23: 9-8-3; Graded Wins: 2008 Hanshin Juvenile Fillies; 2009 Tulip Sho; 2009 Oka Sho; 2009 Yushun Himba; 2010 Kyoto Kinen; 2010 Victoria Mile; 2010 Tenno Sho (Autumn); 2011 Japan Cup; Notes: 2010 Japanese Horse of the Year	
7	Adelheid	15 March 2007	Mare	Bay	Agnes Tachyon	Sunday Racing	Hiroyoshi Matsuda (Ritto)	1:0-0-0; Notes: Granddam to Embroidery	
8	Tosen Reve	21 March 2008	Stallion	Bay	Deep Impact	Takaya Shimakawa	Yasutoshi Ikee (Ritto)	33: 8-0-4; Graded Wins: 2012 Epsom Cup	
9	**Joie de Vivre**	13 May 2009	Mare	Bay	Deep Impact	Sunday Racing	Hiroyoshi Matsuda (Ritto)	7: 2-0-1; Graded Wins: 2011 Hanshin Juvenile Fillies; Notes: Died whilst in active career	
	unfertilized				Special Week				
10	Sang Real	8 May 2011	Mare	Brown	Zenno Rob Roy	Sunday Racing	Manabu Ikezoe (Ritto)	13: 2-0-0; Graded Wins: 2014 Flora Stakes Notes: foaled Melchior (2024 Bluebird Cup)	
	unfertilized								
11	Erbschaft	15 May 2013	Stallion	Brown	Deep Impact	Kazuyoshi Urano	Yuichi Saito (NAR)	66: 8-6-9	
	unfertilized								
12	Primera Vista	17 March 2015	Mare	Chestnut	Orfevre	Sunday Racing	Hiroyasu Tanaka (Miho)	13: 2-0-0	
	stillborn				Rulership				

=== Retiring and death ===
She retired from breeding in 2015 and spent the rest of her life in the Northern Farm. On 25 February 2022, Biwa Heidi died due to old age two weeks before her 29th birthday. Northern Farm manager, Fumihiko Nakajima quoted on the death:

"We are filled with gratitude for the many successful horses she has produced, including Buena Vista. After retiring from breeding in 2015, she watched over her foals as a lead horse. It is a great pity that she passed away so suddenly while enjoying a healthy retirement. We hope she rests in peace."

== Pedigree ==
Pedigree of Biwa Heidi (JPN), dark bay mare, 1993
Sire Caerleon (USA) 1980	Nijinsky II	Northern Dancer	Nearctic
Sire Caerleon (USA) 1980	Nijinsky II	Northern Dancer	Natalma
Sire Caerleon (USA) 1980	Nijinsky II	Flaming Page	Bull Page
Sire Caerleon (USA) 1980	Nijinsky II	Flaming Page	Flaring Top
Sire Caerleon (USA) 1980	Foreseer	Round Table	Princequillo
Sire Caerleon (USA) 1980	Foreseer	Round Table	Knights Daughter
Sire Caerleon (USA) 1980	Foreseer	Regal Gleam	Hail to Reason
Sire Caerleon (USA) 1980	Foreseer	Regal Gleam	Miz Carol
Dam Aghsan (IRE) 1985	Lord Gayle	Sir Gaylord	Turn-to
Dam Aghsan (IRE) 1985	Lord Gayle	Sir Gaylord	Somethingroyal
Dam Aghsan (IRE) 1985	Lord Gayle	Sticky Case	Court Martial
Dam Aghsan (IRE) 1985	Lord Gayle	Sticky Case	Run Honey
Dam Aghsan (IRE) 1985	Santa Luciana	Luciano	Henry the Seventh
Dam Aghsan (IRE) 1985	Santa Luciana	Luciano	Light Arctic
Dam Aghsan (IRE) 1985	Santa Luciana	Suleika	Ticino
Dam Aghsan (IRE) 1985	Santa Luciana	Suleika	Schwarzblaurot (Family: 16-c)

- Biwa Heidi was an inbred by 4 x 5 to Princequillo (Somethingroyal's sire) and 4 x 5 to Turn-to (Hail to Reason's sire).
