= Admire Japan =

Japanese Thoroughbred racehorse (foaled 2002)

Admire Japan; アドマイヤジャパン
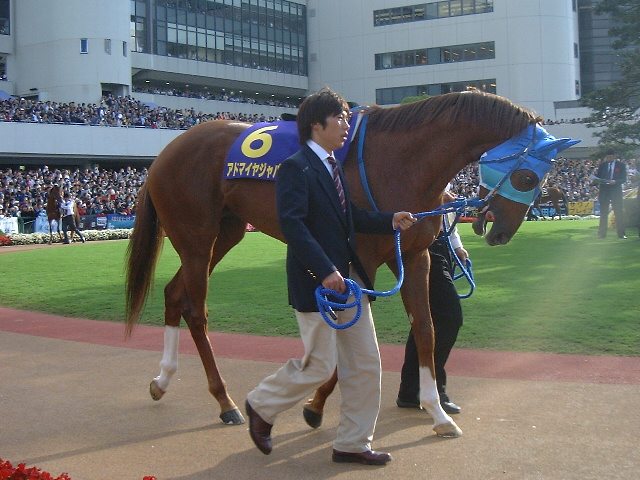
- Admire Japan at the 2005 Kikuka Shō
- Breed: Thoroughbred
- Sire: Sunday Silence
- Grandsire: Halo
- Dam: Biwa Heidi
- Damsire: Caerleon
- Sex: Stallion
- Foaled: 16 April 2002 (age 24)
- Country: Japan
- Colour: Chestnut
- Breeder: Hayata Farm Niikappu Branch
- Owner: Riichi Kondo
- Racing colours
- Trainer: Hiroyoshi Matsuda
- Jockey: Norihiro Yokoyama; Katsumi Ando; Hideaki Miyuki; Yasunari Iwata
- Record: 10: 2-2-2
- Earnings: ¥168,630,000

Major wins
- Keisei Hai (2005)

Admire Japan (Japanese: アドマイヤジャパン, Adomaiya Japan; foaled 16 April 2002) is a retired Japanese Thoroughbred racehorse and former sire. He recorded two wins from ten starts between 2004 and 2006, including the Keisei Hai in 2005. Although he failed to defeat the undefeated Triple Crown winner Deep Impact in their five meetings, he finished second in the Kikuka Shō and third in the Satsuki Shō, establishing himself as one of the leading colts of his generation. His name combines the owner's prefix "Admire" with "Japan".

== Background ==
Admire Japan is a chestnut stallion bred in Niikappu, Hokkaido, by the Hayata Farm Niikappu Branch. He was sired by Sunday Silence, the leading sire in Japan at the time, and his dam was Biwa Heidi, the winner of the 1995 Hanshin Juvenile Fillies. His half-siblings include the Grade 1 winners Buena Vista and Joie de Vivre, as well as the graded stakes winners Admire Aura, Tosen Reve, and Sang Real. He was owned by Riichi Kondo and trained by Hiroyoshi Matsuda at the JRA's Ritto Training Center.

== Racing career ==
=== 2004: two-year-old season ===
Admire Japan debuted on 5 December 2004 in a 2-year-old newcomer race over 2000 metres on turf at Hanshin Racecourse. Ridden by Katsumi Ando, he was the most favoured to win and won the race by 0.3 seconds from All in Sunday. He was immediately stepped up to graded stakes level on 25 December in the Radio Tampa Hai Nisai Stakes at Hanshin. Ridden by Norihiro Yokoyama, he finished third behind Vermilion.

=== 2005: three-year-old season ===
He began his three-year-old campaign on 16 January in the Keisei Hai at Nakayama Racecourse, defeating Six Sense by 0.2 seconds to record his first graded stakes victory. On 6 March, he contested the Yayoi Sho at Nakayama, where he faced Deep Impact for the first time. He finished second, beaten a neck by the eventual Triple Crown winner. In the Satsuki Shō on 17 April, he started the race as the 3rd favoured and finished third, 3.5 lengths behind Deep Impact.

On 29 May, he ran in the Tōkyō Yūshun at Tokyo Racecourse with Hideaki Miyuki as his jockey, but finished tenth behind Deep Impact. After a summer break, he finished fifth in the Kobe Shimbun Hai at Hanshin on 25 September, again behind Deep Impact. On 23 October, he contested the Kikuka Shō at Kyoto Racecourse. Starting 6th favourite, he took the lead early in the straight and held on for second place, finishing 0.3 seconds behind Deep Impact but four lengths clear of the third-place finisher Rosenkreuz. He ended his season on 27 November in the Japan Cup at Tokyo, finishing eleventh behind Alkaased.

=== 2006: four-year-old season ===
Admire Japan returned on 2 April in the Sankei Osaka Hai at Hanshin. Ridden by Yasunari Iwata, he was the 2nd favoured to win but finished ninth behind Company. He was subsequently diagnosed with a bowed tendon in his right foreleg and was retired to stud in September 2006.

== Race record ==
The following table details all 10 starts of Admire Japan's racing career based on official JBIS and netkeiba records. Record current as of his final start on 2 April 2006.

Date	Distance (Condition)	Race	Class	Course	Odds (Favourite)	Field	Finish	Time	Jockey	Winning (Losing) Margin	Winner (2nd Place)	Ref
2004 – two-year-old season
Dec 5	Turf 2000 m (Good)	2-Y-O Newcomer	Maiden	Hanshin	2.5 (1st)	15	1st	1:46.9	Katsumi Ando	–0.3	(All in Sunday)	
Dec 25	Turf 2000 m (Good)	Radio Tampa Hai Nisai Stakes	GIII	Hanshin	5.8 (3rd)	9	3rd	2:03.8	Norihiro Yokoyama	0.3	Vermilion	
2005 – three-year-old season
Jan 16	Turf 2000 m (Heavy)	Keisei Hai	GIII	Nakayama	2.6 (1st)	10	1st	2:07.4	Norihiro Yokoyama	–0.2	(Six Sense)	
Mar 6	Turf 2000 m (Good)	Yayoi Sho	GII	Nakayama	12.3 (3rd)	10	2nd	2:02.2	Norihiro Yokoyama	0.0	Deep Impact	
Apr 17	Turf 2000 m (Good)	Satsuki Shō	GI	Nakayama	15.5 (3rd)	18	3rd	1:59.8	Norihiro Yokoyama	0.6	Deep Impact	
May 29	Turf 2400 m (Good)	Tōkyō Yūshun	GI	Tokyo	38.8 (6th)	18	10th	2:25.3	Hideaki Miyuki	2.0	Deep Impact	
Sep 25	Turf 2000 m (Good)	Kobe Shimbun Hai	GII	Hanshin	21.1 (3rd)	13	5th	1:59.9	Norihiro Yokoyama	1.5	Deep Impact	
Oct 23	Turf 3000 m (Good)	Kikuka Shō	GI	Kyoto	50.3 (6th)	16	2nd	3:04.9	Norihiro Yokoyama	0.3	Deep Impact	
Nov 27	Turf 2400 m (Good)	Japan Cup	GI	Tokyo	11.9 (4th)	18	11th	2:23.2	Norihiro Yokoyama	1.1	Alkaased	
2006 – four-year-old season
Apr 2	Turf 2000 m (Heavy)	Sankei Osaka Hai	GII	Hanshin	4.1 (2nd)	12	9th	2:05.8	Yasunari Iwata	1.3	Company	

== Stud career ==
Admire Japan entered stud in 2007 at the Breeders Stallion Station in Hidaka, Hokkaido. His first crop debuted in 2010, and Apollo Genie became his first JRA winner on 3 July at Fukushima. In September 2013, he was transferred to the Yushun Stallion Station. He was retired from stud duty in July 2018. While he did not sire any major stakes winners in Japan, he found success as a broodmare sire when his granddaughter Circle of Life won the Hanshin Juvenile Fillies in 2021. His other notable progeny include Grandes Bal, Shigeru Sakuranbo and Katsugeki Japan, who won regional stakes races.

== After stud career ==
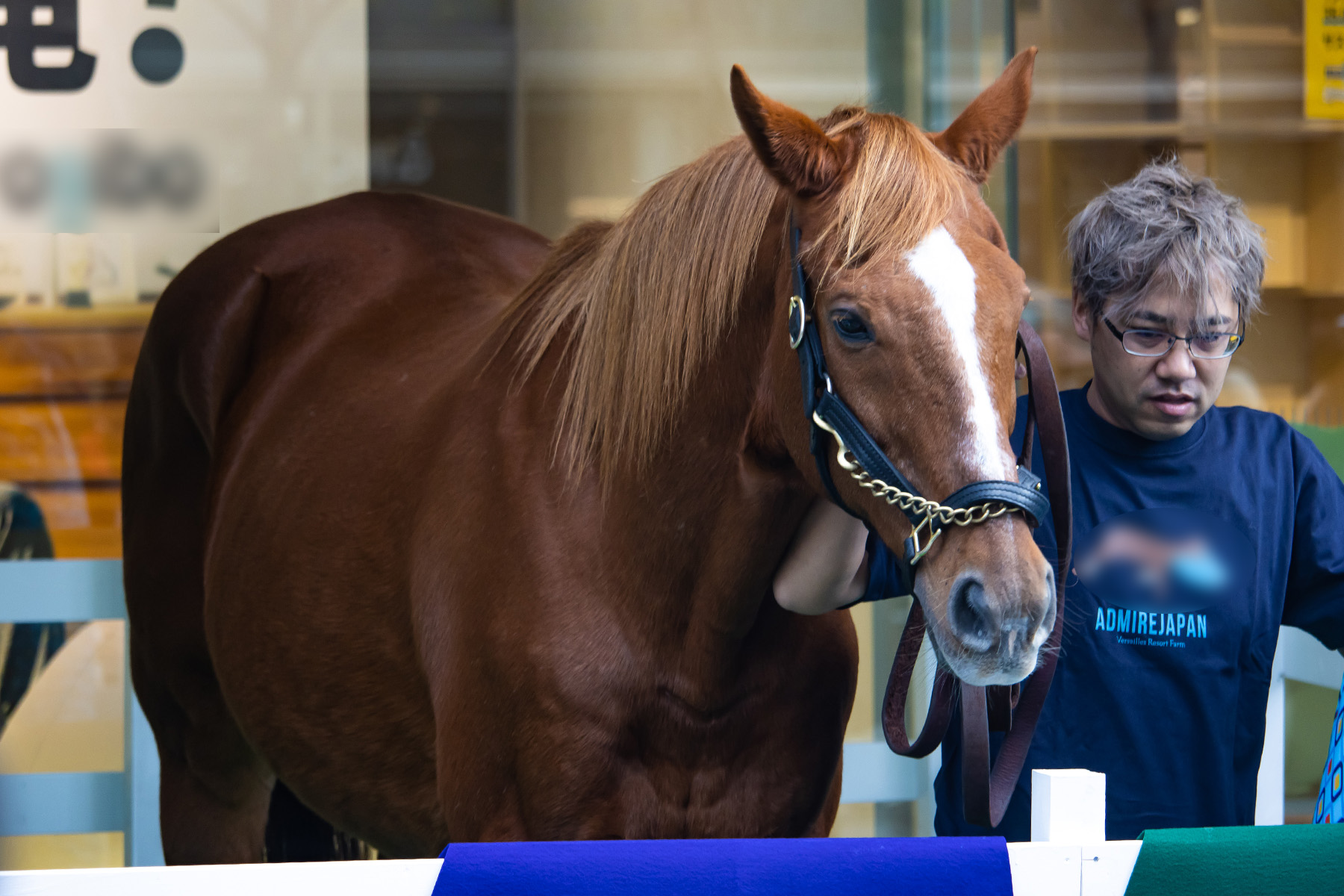
Admire Japan at a Yogibo event at their Osaka store in October 2023

In November 2018, Admire Japan became a welfare recipient under the JRA's retired horse program at the Adachi Yo O Farm in Niikappu. In July 2019, he moved to Versailles Resort Farm. In June 2020, former jockey Shinji Fujita rode him, noting his spirited behavior. He was temporarily moved to Higashi-Kanto Baji High School for retraining in July 2020, before returning to Versailles Resort Farm in November.

In May 2022, Versailles Resort Farm posted a video of Admire Japan relaxing his head on a Yogibo beanbag sofa. The video went viral, garnering millions of views and widespread media attention. In August 2022, he signed an official advertising contract with Yogibo for a reported 10 million yen (equivalent to 12 years of carrots), with an indefinite contract period.

== Pedigree ==
Pedigree of Admire Japan (JPN)
Sire Sunday Silence (USA) 1986	Halo (USA); 1969	Hail to Reason	Turn-to
Sire Sunday Silence (USA) 1986	Halo (USA); 1969	Hail to Reason	Nothirdchance
Sire Sunday Silence (USA) 1986	Halo (USA); 1969	Cosmah	Cosmic Bomb
Sire Sunday Silence (USA) 1986	Halo (USA); 1969	Cosmah	Almahmoud
Sire Sunday Silence (USA) 1986	Wishing Well (USA); 1975	Understanding	Promised Land
Sire Sunday Silence (USA) 1986	Wishing Well (USA); 1975	Understanding	Pretty Ways
Sire Sunday Silence (USA) 1986	Wishing Well (USA); 1975	Mountain Flower	Montparnasse
Sire Sunday Silence (USA) 1986	Wishing Well (USA); 1975	Mountain Flower	Edelweiss
Dam Biwa Heidi (JPN) 1993	Caerleon (USA); 1980	Nijinsky	Northern Dancer
Dam Biwa Heidi (JPN) 1993	Caerleon (USA); 1980	Nijinsky	Flaming Page
Dam Biwa Heidi (JPN) 1993	Caerleon (USA); 1980	Foreseer	Round Table
Dam Biwa Heidi (JPN) 1993	Caerleon (USA); 1980	Foreseer	Regal Gleam
Dam Biwa Heidi (JPN) 1993	Aghsan (FR); 1985	Lord Gayle	Sir Gaylord
Dam Biwa Heidi (JPN) 1993	Aghsan (FR); 1985	Lord Gayle	Sticky Case
Dam Biwa Heidi (JPN) 1993	Aghsan (FR); 1985	Santa Luciana	Luciano
Dam Biwa Heidi (JPN) 1993	Aghsan (FR); 1985	Santa Luciana	Suleika

- Admire Japan is inbred 3 × 5 to Hail to Reason and 4 × 5 to Turn-to.
- His dam Biwa Heidi won the 1995 Hanshin Juvenile Fillies.
- His half-siblings include Buena Vista, Admire Aura, Tosen Reve, Joie de Vivre and Sang Real.

== See also ==
- Thoroughbred racing in Japan
