= Admire Aura =

Japanese Thoroughbred racehorse

Admire Aura アドマイヤオーラ
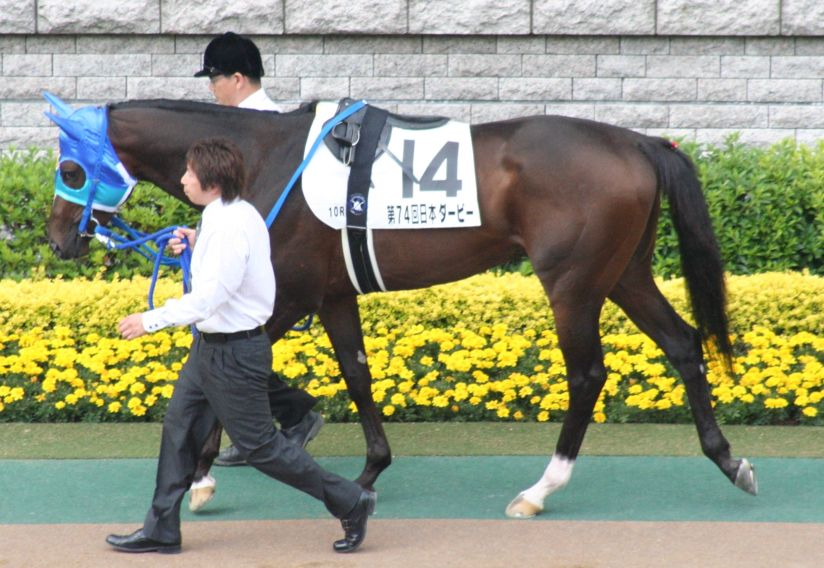
- Admire Aura at the parade ring of the 2007 Tokyo Yushun
- Breed: Thoroughbred
- Sire: Agnes Tachyon
- Grandsire: Sunday Silence
- Dam: Biwa Heidi
- Damsire: Caerleon
- Sex: Stallion
- Foaled: 19 February 2004
- Died: 3 March 2015 (aged 11)
- Country: Japan
- Color: Bay
- Breeder: Northern Farm
- Owner: Riichi Kondo
- Racing colors
- Trainer: Hiroyoshi Matsuda
- Jockey: Katsumi Ando
- Record: 16: 4-2-3
- Earnings: ¥276,865,000

Major wins
- Kyōto Kinen (2008); Yayoi Sho (2007); Shinzan Kinen (2007)
- Last updated on December 20, 2025

Admire Aura (Japanese: アドマイヤオーラ, Hepburn: Adomaiya Ōra; 19 February 2004 – 3 March 2015) was a Japanese Thoroughbred racehorse. He was active from 2006 to 2010 and earned 276,865,000 yen during his racing career.

== Background ==
Admire Aura was born on February 19, 2004, on Northern Farm located in Abira, Hokkaido. He was sired by Agnes Tachyon, an undefeated Japanese racehorse who also sired other racehorses such as Daiwa Scarlet and Deep Sky. His grandsire, Sunday Silence, was a leading sire in Japan for thirteen consecutive years, from 1995 to 2007. His dam is Biwa Heidi who was sired by Caerleon, who was also a leading sire in Great Britain and Ireland in 1988 and 1991. Biwa Heidi was a successful broodmare who not only foaled Admire Aura, but also Buena Vista and Joie de Vivre, both of whom won Grade I races in Japan, as well as Rottenmeier, who foaled Embroidery.

== Racing Record ==
Admire Aura competed in a total of 16 races, 4 of which he won. Below is the table of his racing statistics, which was taken from JBIS and netkeiba.

Date	Race	Distance	Surface	Track	Finish	Field	Jockey	Winner (Runner-up)
2006 – two-year-old season
Nov 4	2YO DEBUT	1600m	Turf	Kyoto	1st	10	Yutaka Take	(Good Luck Hour)
Dec 16	Chukyo Nisai Stakes	1800m	Turf	Chukyo	2nd	8	Yutaka Take	Daiwa Scarlet
2007 – three-year-old season
Jan 8	Shinzan Kinen	1600m	Turf	Kyoto	1st	10	Yasunari Iwata	(Daiwa Scarlet)
Mar 4	Yayoi Sho	2000m	Turf	Nakayama	1st	14	Yutaka Take	(Coconut Punch)
Apr 15	Satsuki Sho	2000m	Turf	Nakayama	4th	18	Yutaka Take	Victory
May 27	Tokyo Yushun	2400m	Turf	Tokyo	3rd	18	Yasunari Iwata	Vodka
Dec 8	Naruo Kinen	1800m	Turf	Hanshin	3rd	16	Katsumi Ando	Higher Game
2008 – four-year-old season
Jan 5	Kyoto Kimpai	1600m	Turf	Kyoto	2nd	16	Katsumi Ando	Eishin Deputy
Feb 23	Kyoto Kinen	2200m	Turf	Kyoto	1st	16	Katsumi Ando	(Admire Fuji)
Mar 29	Dubai Duty Free	1777m	Turf	Nad Al Sheba	9th	16	Katsumi Ando	Jay Peg
May 31	Kinko Sho	2000m	Turf	Chukyo	6th	17	Katsumi Ando	Eishin Deputy
Jun 29	Takarazuka Kinen	2200m	Turf	Hanshin	14th	14	Katsumi Ando	Eishin Deputy
2009 – five-year-old season
Jan 5	Kyoto Kimpai	1600m	Turf	Kyoto	4th	16	Katsumi Ando	Tamamo Support
Feb 21	Kyōto Kinen	2200m	Turf	Kyoto	Scratched		Katsumi Ando	Asakusa Kings
2010 – six-year-old season
May 29	Kinko Sho	2000m	Turf	Kyoto	5th	14	Katsumi Ando	Earnestly
Jun 27	Fukushima TV Open	1800m	Turf	Fukushima	3rd	16	Hiroyuki Uchida	Battle Banyan
Aug 1	Kokura Kinen	2000m	Turf	Kokura	Scratched		Katsumi Ando	Nihonpillow Regalo
Aug 29	Niigata Kinen	1800m	Turf	Niigata	17th	17	Hiroki Goto	Narita Crystal

== Stud record ==
c = colt, f = filly
bold = GI/JpnI stakes

Grade winners
Foaled	Name	Sex	Major Wins
2012	Cross Krieger	c	Leopard Stakes, Hyogo Championship
2012	Nobo Baccara	c	Sakitama Hai, Procyon Stakes, Capella Stakes, Kakitsubata Kinen
2015	Arctos	c	Sakitama Hai, Procyon Stakes, **Mile Championship Nambu Hai** (2x)

== Pedigree ==
Pedigree of Admire Aura, bay horse, 2004
Sire Agnes Tachyon 1998	Sunday Silence; 1986	Halo	Hail To Reason
Sire Agnes Tachyon 1998	Sunday Silence; 1986	Halo	Cosmah
Sire Agnes Tachyon 1998	Sunday Silence; 1986	Wishing Well	Understanding
Sire Agnes Tachyon 1998	Sunday Silence; 1986	Wishing Well	Mountain Flower
Sire Agnes Tachyon 1998	Agnes Flora; 1987	Royal Ski	Raja Baba
Sire Agnes Tachyon 1998	Agnes Flora; 1987	Royal Ski	Coz o'Nijinsky
Sire Agnes Tachyon 1998	Agnes Flora; 1987	Agnes Lady	Remand
Sire Agnes Tachyon 1998	Agnes Flora; 1987	Agnes Lady	Ikoma Eikan
Dam Biwa Heidi 1993	Caerleon; 1980	Nijinsky	Northern Dancer
Dam Biwa Heidi 1993	Caerleon; 1980	Nijinsky	Flaming Page
Dam Biwa Heidi 1993	Caerleon; 1980	Foreseer	Round Table
Dam Biwa Heidi 1993	Caerleon; 1980	Foreseer	Regal Gleam
Dam Biwa Heidi 1993	Aghsan; 1985	Lord Gayle	Sir Gaylord
Dam Biwa Heidi 1993	Aghsan; 1985	Lord Gayle	Sticky Case
Dam Biwa Heidi 1993	Aghsan; 1985	Santa Luciana	Luciano
Dam Biwa Heidi 1993	Aghsan; 1985	Santa Luciana	Suleika
