= Onyankopon =

Onyankopon may refer to:

- An alternative name for Nyame, the God of the Akan people of Ghana
- Onyankopon, a character in the manga series Attack on Titan
- Onyankopon, winner of the 2022 Keisei Stakes
