= JRA Award for Best Two-Year-Old Filly =

Japanese thoroughbred horse racing award

The JRA Award for Best Two-Year-Old Filly is a title awarded annually by the Japan Racing Association (JRA) to an outstanding horse of that category in Japanese Thoroughbred horse racing. Since 1987 the honor has been part of the JRA Awards.

== Winners ==
| Year | Horse | Trainer | Owner |
|---|---|---|---|
| 1987 | Shino Cross | Nishizuka Tokachi | Hiroshi Fukui |
| 1988 | Idol Marie | Mitsumasa Hamada | Shadai Racing |
| 1989 | Sakura Saezuri | Katsutaro Sakai | Sakura Commerce |
| 1990 | Northern Driver | Akio Tsurudome | Shadai Racing |
| 1991 | Nishino Flower | Masahiro Matsuda | Masayuki Nishiyama |
| 1992 | Suehiro Jo O | Takeshi Yoshinaga | Kobayashi Otojiro |
| 1993 | Hishi Amazon | Takao Nakano | Abe Masaichiro |
| 1994 | Yamanin Paradise | Hidekazu Asami | Doi Shoji Co Ltd. |
| 1995 | Biwa Heidi | Mitsumasa Hamada | Biwa Co Ltd. |
| 1996 | Mejiro Dober | Yokichi Okubo | Mejiro Shoji |
| 1997 | Ein Bride | Toru Miya | Miyoji Araki |
| 1998 | Stinger | Kazuo Fujisawa | Teruya Yoshida |
| 1999 | Yamakatsu Suzaran | Kaneo Ikezoe | Hiroyasu Yamada |
| 2000 | T M Ocean | Katsuichi Nishiura | Masatsugu Takezono |
| 2001 | Tamuro Cherry | Masato Nishizono | Tuen Taniguchi |
| 2002 | Peace of World | Masahiro Sakaguchi | Tadahi Iida |
| 2003 | Yamanin Sucre | Hidekazu Asami | Hajime Doi |
| 2004 | Shonan Peintre | Yokichi Okubo | T Kunimoto |
| 2005 | T M Precure | Tadao Igarashi | Masatsugu Takezono |
| 2006 | Vodka | Katsuhiko Sumii | Yuzo Tanimizu |
| 2007 | Tall Poppy | Katsuhiko Sumii | Carrot Farm |
| 2008 | Buena Vista | Hiroshi Matsuda | Sunday Racing |
| 2009 | Apapane | Sakae Kunieda | Kaneko Makoto Holdings Co Ltd |
| 2010 | Reve d'Essor | Hiroshi Matsuda | Sunday Racing |
| 2011 | Joie de Vivre | Hiroshi Matsuda | Sunday Racing |
| 2012 | Robe Tissage | Naosuke Sugai | Silk Co.Ltd |
| 2013 | Red Reveur | Naosuke Sugai | Tokyo Horse Racing Co. Ltd |
| 2014 | Shonan Adela | Yoshitaka Ninomiya | Tetsuhide Kunimoto |
| 2015 | Major Emblem | Yasuhito Tamura | Sunday Racing Co Ltd |
| 2016 | Soul Stirring | Kazuo Fujisawa | Shadai Race Horse Co Ltd |
| 2017 | Lucky Lilac | Mikio Matsunaga | Sunday Racing Co Ltd |
| 2018 | Danon Fantasy | Mitsumasa Nakauchida | Danox Co Ltd |
| 2019 | Resistencia | Takeshi Matsushita | Carrot Farm |
| 2020 | Sodashi | Naosuke Sugai | Kaneko Makoto Holdings |
| 2021 | Circle of Life | Sakae Kunieda | Masatake Iida |
| 2022 | Liberty Island | Mitsumasa Nakauchida | Sunday Racing |
| 2023 | Ascoli Piceno | Yoichi Kuroiwa | Sunday Racing |
| 2024 | Arma Veloce | Hiroyuki Uemura | Teruo Ono |
| 2025 | Star Anise | Tomokazu Takano | Katsumi Yoshida |
