= Joie de Vivre (horse) =

Japanese Thoroughbred racehorse

Joie de Vivre; ジョワドヴィーヴル
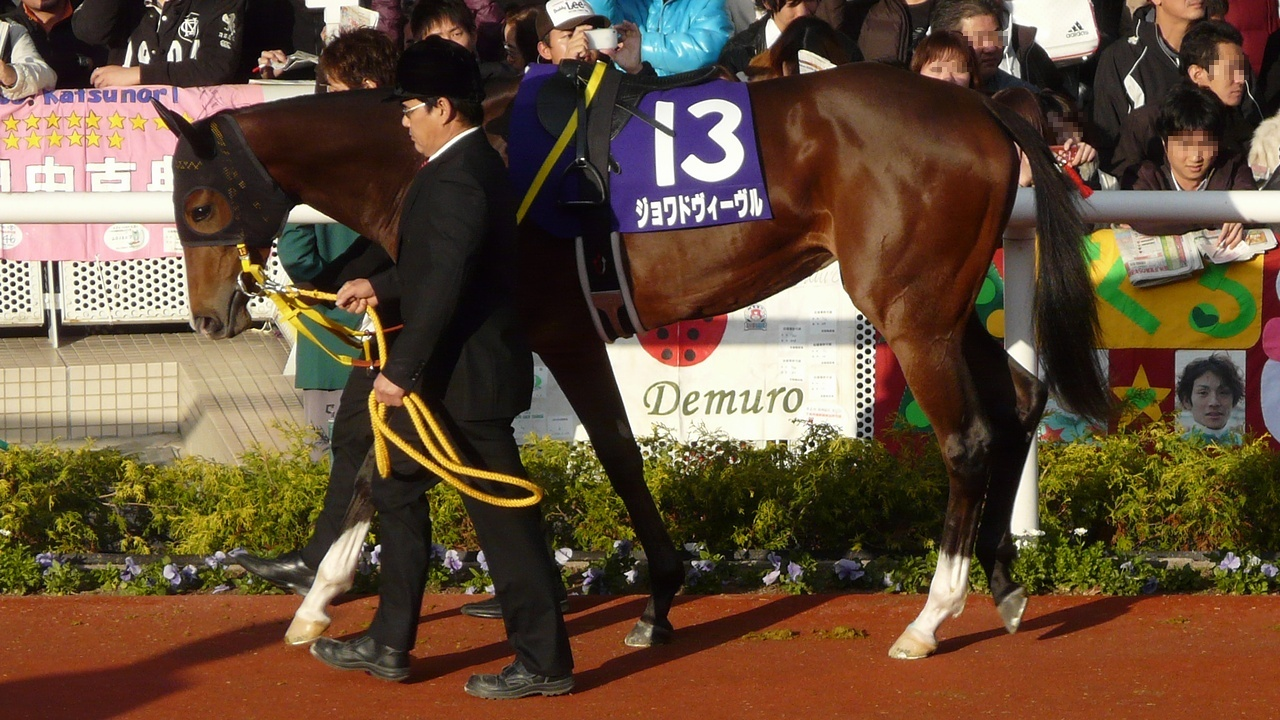
- Joie de Vivre in 2011
- Sire: Deep Impact
- Grandsire: Sunday Silence
- Dam: Biwa Heidi
- Damsire: Caerleon
- Sex: Mare
- Foaled: 13 May 2009
- Died: May 29, 2013 (aged 4)
- Country: Japan
- Colour: Bay
- Breeder: Northern Farm
- Owner: Sunday Racing
- Racing colours
- Trainer: Hiroyoshi Matsuda
- Jockey: Yuichi Fukunaga
- Record: 7: 2-0-1
- Earnings: 95,948,000 JPY

Major wins
- Hanshin Juvenile Fillies (2011)

Awards
- JRA Award for Best Two-Year-Old Filly (2011)

Joie de Vivre (Japanese ジョワドヴィーヴル, May 13, 2009 – May 29, 2013) was a Japanese Thoroughbred racehorse. As a two-year-old in 2011 she was rated the best filly of her generation in Japan, after winning both of her races including the Hanshin Juvenile Fillies. In the following spring she ran third in the Tulip Sho and sixth in the Oka Sho before her season was curtailed by injury. She returned in 2013 but failed to win, with her best effort coming on her final start when she finished a close fourth in the Victoria Mile. She died later that year after suffering a fracture during training.

== Background ==
Joie de Vivre was a bay mare bred in Hokkaido by Northern Farm. During her racing career she carried the black, yellow, pink and red colours of Sunday Racing and was trained by Hiroyoshi Matsuda. She was ridden in most of her races by Yuichi Fukunaga. She was a small mare, weighing no more than 436 kg during her racing career.

She was from the second crop of foals sired by Deep Impact, who was the Japanese Horse of the Year in 2005 and 2006, winning races including the Tokyo Yushun, Tenno Sho, Arima Kinen and Japan Cup. Deep Impact's other progeny include Gentildonna, Harp Star, Kizuna, A Shin Hikari, Marialite and Saxon Warrior.

Joie de Vivre's dam Biwa Heidi showed top class form as a juvenile, winning the Hanshin Juvenile Fillies in 1995. As a broodmare she also produced the outstanding racemare Buena Vista. Her dam, the Irish mare Aghsan, was a half-sister to the dam of Manhattan Cafe.

== Racing career ==
=== 2011: two-year-old season ===
On 12 November at Kyoto Racecourse, Joie de Vivre made her track debut in a contest for previously unraced juveniles over 1600 metres and won ahead of the colt Temujin and sixteen others. The filly was then stepped up to the highest class for the Grade 1 Hanshin Juvenile Fillies over the same distance at Hanshin Racecourse four weeks later. She started the 5.8/1 fourth choice in the betting behind Sound of Heart (unbeaten in four races), Epice Arome (Kokura Nisai Stakes) and La Scintillante while the other fourteen runners included Fine Choice (Hakodate Nisai Stakes) and I'm Yours (Fantasy Stakes). After racing in mid-division Joie de Vivre produced a strong run on the outside in the straight to take the lead and drew away in the last 100 metres to win by two and a half lengths from I'm Yours.

In the official ratings for Japanese two-year-olds Joie de Vivre was rated the best juvenile filly of the year, five pounds ahead of I'm Yours and Sound of Heart and three pounds below the top-rated colt Alfredo. In January 2012 Joie de Vivre was awarded the JRA Award for Best Two-Year-Old Filly at the JRA Awards for 2011, receiving 283 of the 285 votes.

=== 2012: three-year-old season ===
Joie de Vivre made her first appearance of 2012 on 3 March at Hanshin when she started the 0.3/1 favourite for the 1600 metre Tulip Sho, a race which serves as a trial for the Oka Sho. After racing in mid-division she made progress on the wide outside in the straight but sustained her first defeat as she came home third, beaten two and a half lengths and a neck by Hana's Goal and Epice Arome. Despite her defeat, the filly started favourite in an eighteen-runner field for the Oka Sho five weeks later. She raced towards the rear of the field and although she made progress in the closing stages she was unable to catch the leaders and finished sixth, just under three lengths behind the winner Gentildonna.

=== 2013: four-year-old season ===
After a ten-month absence, Joie de Vivre returned in February at Kyoto when she finished seventh behind Tosen Ra in the Grade 2 Kyoto Kinen over 2200 metres. She was dropped to Grade 3 class for the Chunichi Shimbun Hai at Chukyo Racecourse on 9 March but came home sixth, three lengths behind the winner Satono Apollo. On 12 May Joie de Vivre was dropped back to 1600 metres for the Grade 1 Victoria Mile at Tokyo Racecourse and started at odds of 12.7/1 in an eighteen-runner field. Ridden by Yuga Kawada she came from the rear of the field with a strong late run to finish fourth behind Verxina, Whale Capture and Meine Isabel, beaten a length by the winner. She was then trained for the Naruo Kinen, but was injured during training on May 29. She was found to have an open fracture of the left tibia. Her prognosis was poor and she was euthanized at the clinic. She died at the age of four.

== Racing form ==
Joie de Vivre won two races in seven starts. This data is available in JBIS and netkeiba.

Date	Track	Race	Grade	Distance (Condition)	Entry	HN	Odds (Favored)	Finish	Time	Margins	Jockey	Winner (Runner-up)
2011 – two-year-old season
Nov 12	Kyoto	2yo Newcomer		1,600 m (Firm)	18	9	1.3 (1)	1st	1:36.7	–0.2	Yuichi Fukunaga	(Temujin)
Dec 11	Hanshin	Hanshin Juvenile Fillies	1	1,600 m (Firm)	18	13	6.8 (4)	1st	1:34.9	–0.4	Yuichi Fukunaga	(I'm Yours)
2012 – three-year-old season
Mar 2	Hanshin	Tulip Sho	3	1,600 m (Firm)	14	5	1.3 (1)	3rd	1:36.0	0.5	Yuichi Fukunaga	(Hana's Goal)
Apr 8	Hanshin	Oka Sho	1	1,600 m (Firm)	18	17	2.3 (1)	6th	1:35.2	0.6	Yuichi Fukunaga	Gentildonna
2013 – four-year-old season
Feb 10	Kyoto	Kyoto Kinen	2	2,200 m (Firm)	11	8	9.9 (7)	7th	2:13.9	1.4	Yuichi Fukunaga	Tosen Ra
Mar 9	Chukyo	Chunichi Shimbun Hai	3	2,000 m (Firm)	18	11	9.0 (6)	6th	2:00.0	0.4	Keita Tosaki	Satono Apollo
May 12	Tokyo	Victoria Mile	1	1,600 m (Firm)	18	3	13.7 (4)	4th	1:32.6	0.2	Yuga Kawada	Verxina

Legend:
Turf

== Pedigree ==
Pedigree of Joie de Vivre (JPN), bay mare 2009
Sire Deep Impact (JPN) 2002	Sunday Silence (USA); 1986	Halo	Hail to Reason
Sire Deep Impact (JPN) 2002	Sunday Silence (USA); 1986	Halo	Cosmah
Sire Deep Impact (JPN) 2002	Sunday Silence (USA); 1986	Wishing Well	Understanding
Sire Deep Impact (JPN) 2002	Sunday Silence (USA); 1986	Wishing Well	Mountain Flower
Sire Deep Impact (JPN) 2002	Wind in Her Hair (IRE); 1991	Alzao (USA)	Lyphard
Sire Deep Impact (JPN) 2002	Wind in Her Hair (IRE); 1991	Alzao (USA)	Lady Rebecca (GB)
Sire Deep Impact (JPN) 2002	Wind in Her Hair (IRE); 1991	Burghclere (GB)	Busted
Sire Deep Impact (JPN) 2002	Wind in Her Hair (IRE); 1991	Burghclere (GB)	Highclere
Dam Biwa Heidi (JPN) 1993	Caerleon (USA); 1980	Nijinsky (CAN)	Northern Dancer
Dam Biwa Heidi (JPN) 1993	Caerleon (USA); 1980	Nijinsky (CAN)	Flaming Page
Dam Biwa Heidi (JPN) 1993	Caerleon (USA); 1980	Foreseer	Round Table
Dam Biwa Heidi (JPN) 1993	Caerleon (USA); 1980	Foreseer	Regal Gleam
Dam Biwa Heidi (JPN) 1993	Aghan (IRE); 1985	Lord Gayle (USA)	Sir Gaylord
Dam Biwa Heidi (JPN) 1993	Aghan (IRE); 1985	Lord Gayle (USA)	Sticky Case (GB)
Dam Biwa Heidi (JPN) 1993	Aghan (IRE); 1985	Santa Luciana (GER)	Luciano (GB)
Dam Biwa Heidi (JPN) 1993	Aghan (IRE); 1985	Santa Luciana (GER)	Suleika (Family: 16-c)
