= Shinzan Kinen =

Shinzan Kinen シンザン記念
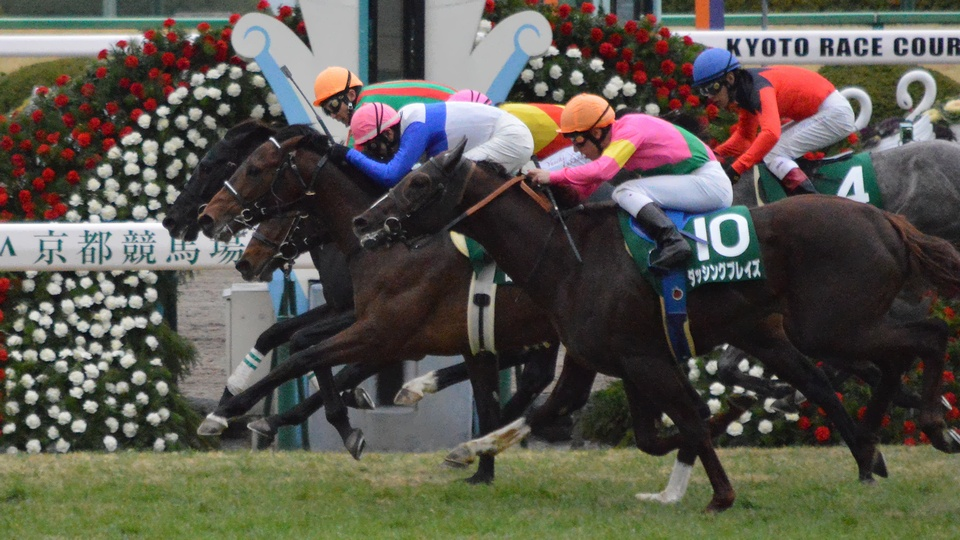
- Guanciale wins the 2015 Shinzan Kinen
- Class: Grade 3
- Location: Kyoto Racecourse
- Inaugurated: January 15, 1967
- Race type: Thoroughbred - Flat racing

Race information
- Distance: 1,600 meters
- Surface: Turf
- Track: Right-handed
- Qualification: 3-y-o
- Weight: 57 kg
- Purse: ¥ 87,960,000 (as of 2026): 1st: ¥ 41,000,000; 2nd: ¥ 16,000,000; 3rd: ¥ 10,000,000

The Shinzan Kinen (シンザン記念) is a Grade 3 (GIII) flat horse race in Japan.

== Namesake ==
The race was named in honor of Shinzan, Japan’s second Triple Crown winner (1964), who also won the Tenno Sho (Autumn) and Arima Kinen in 1965, earning the title “Five-Crown Horse.”

== Background ==
The Shinzan Kinen is a Grade III Thoroughbred race in Japan open to 3-year-old horses of either sex. It is held annually in early January at Kyoto Racecourse over a distance of 1,600 meters on turf (outer course). Eligible entrants include JRA-trained horses, up to two certified NAR (local) horses, and foreign-trained horses with priority entry. The race is run under weight-for-age conditions: colts and geldings carry 57 kg, while fillies receive a 2 kg allowance (55 kg). The first-place prize in 2026 is ¥41 million. The race is officially titled the “Nikkan Sports Sho Shinzan Kinen”, sponsored by Nikkan Sports Nishi-Nihon (Osaka-based), and the winner receives the Nikkan Sports Newspaper Prize.

== History ==
The Shinzan Kinen was inaugurated on January 15, 1967, as a 4-year-old (now 3-year-old) restricted stakes race to commemorate the legendary horse Shinzan. Although the Chukyo Owners’ Association, where Shinzan’s owner, Kosaku Hashimoto, was a member, had lobbied for the race to be held at Chukyo Racecourse, the JRA chose Kyoto, leading instead to the creation of the Chukyo Daishoten as a compromise. The race has been held almost exclusively at Kyoto over 1,600m since its inception, with only a few exceptions: it was run at Hanshin in 1980 and 1994, and temporarily relocated to Chukyo from 2021 to 2023 and again in 2025 due to Kyoto Racecourse renovations and Hanshin stand refurbishment.

It was elevated to Grade III status in 1984 under JRA’s grading system. International participation expanded gradually: foreign-bred horses were allowed from 1995, NAR horses from 1996, and foreign-trained horses from 2009, when it became an international GIII event with up to 9 foreign runners permitted. In 2024, the race formally adopted fixed weight-for-age (57 kg / 55 kg), replacing earlier variable systems.

Although several descendants of Shinzan have competed, including Shinzan Homare (1967), Shingun (1971), and Reigning Land (2015), none have ever won the race named in his honor.

== Past winners ==
Year	Winner	Age	Length (in m)	Jockey	Trainer	Owner	Time
1967	Taigyo	3	T1600	Kunihiko Take	Heizo Take	Yoshio Nakayama	1:39.0
1968	Hikari O	3	T1600	Masazo Ryoke	Yoshio Tanaka	Ichisaburo Matsumoto	1:41.0
1969	Fine Happy	3	T1600	Yoshinori Yanada	Juubee Tsubo	Hisahiro Yoshida	1:38.8
1970	High Prince	3	T1600	Shigetada Takahashi	Isamu Sato	Kazunori Yoshimine	1:36.9
1971	Fi Dor	3	T1600	Yoshito Matsumoto	Bungo Takeda	Obara Kikue	1:42.3
1972	Shinmoedake	3	T1600	Norihito Fujioka	Isao Tanoue	Mitsuyoshi Kubo	1:38.5
1973	Dicta Boy	3	T1600	Masami Shibata	Tadashi Fuse	Shigeo Imai	1:38.8
1974	Naniwa Light	3	T1600	Eiji Shimizu	Mitsuo Ogino	Aya Nishida	1:37.0
1975	Erimo George	3	T1600	Yoichi Fukunaga	Masaaki Okubo	Shinichi Yamamoto	1:38.4
1976	Bambton Shade	3	T1600	Toshifumi Kubo	Shuji Ito	Shozo Higuchi	1:39.3
1977	Tenzan Sakura	3	T1600	Hiroshi Kawachi	Yoshiharu Matsunaga	Saburo Hirano	1:38.1
1978	Lovely Tosho	3	T1600	Hideo Koyauchi	Tameo Toyama	Tosho Sangyo Co. Ltd.	1:37.0
1979	Teruno Eight	3	T1600	Akihiro Iida	Hisao Shimizu	Teruhiko Nakamura	1:37.2
1980	Noto Diver	3	T1600	Tadashi Kayo	Shuji Kitahashi	Noto	1:38.4
1981	Hirono Wakakoma	3	T1600	Hiroshi Kawachi	Shuji Ito	Yuko Ito	1:35.8
1982	Silk Tenzan O	3	T1600	Kiyoaki Ito	Shuji Ito	Shinichi Nakayama	1:36.8
1983	Mejiro Mont Cenis	3	T1600	Eiji Shimizu	Masaaki Okubo	Mejiro Shoji Co. Ltd.	1:36.7
1984	Kitayama Zakura	3	T1600	Sadahiro Kojima	Tameo Toyama	Tatsuya Fujimoto	1:36.3
1985	Life Tateyama	3	T1600	Shigetoshi Saruhashi	Isao Yasuda	Yukio Tsuji	1:37.5
1986	Fresh Voice	3	T1600	Shigeo Koshoji	Naoyuki Sakai	Kazuo Enjo	1:37.3
1987	Yamanin Arden	3	T1600	Nobuyuki Tajima	Yasuo Ikee	Koji Doi	1:38.4
1988	Rugger Black	3	T1600	Yoshiyuki Muramoto	Masaaki Okubo	Keiji Okumura	1:37.2
1989	Foundry Popo	3	T1600	Katsuichi Nishiura	Tatsuo Natsumura	Tomio Mito	1:37.4
1990	Nichido Thunder	3	T1600	Hiroshi Masui	Toshiaki Shirai	Toshio Yamada	1:36.0
1991	Milford Slew	3	T1600	Hiroshi Kawachi	Kotaro Tanaka	Kiyoshi Noritake	1:35.7
1992	Mayano Petrews	3	T1600	Seiki Tabara	Masahiro Sakaguchi	Yu Tadokoro	1:35.8
1993	Amber Lion	3	T1600	Hidetaka Tadokoro	Yukiharu Shikato	Ribot Co. Ltd.	1:35.9
1994	Kokuo Namura	3	T1600	Hiroyuki Uemura	Akihiko Nomura	Nobushige Namura	1:36.8
1995	Meisho Tesoro	3	T1600	Katsuhito Uegomori	Kaoru Hoshikawa	Yoshio Matsumoto	1:34.5
1996	Generalist	3	T1600	Mikio Matsunaga	Shoji Yamamoto	Maeko Farm Ltd.	1:34.5
1997	Seeking the Pearl	3	T1600	Yutaka Take	Shozo Sasaki	Tomoko Uenaka	1:34.6
1998	Dantsu Sirius	3	T1600	Hirofumi Shii	Kenji Yamauchi	Tetsuji Yamamoto	1:36.8
1999	Fusaichi Airedale	3	T1600	Yutaka Take	Kunihide Matsuda	Fusao Sekiguchi	1:34.6
2000	Daitaku Riva	3	T1600	Ryo Takahashi	Kojiro Hashiguchi	Taiyo Farm Ltd.	1:35.4
2001	Derby Regno	3	T1600	Hideaki Miyuki	Shigetada Takahashi	Derby Co. Ltd.	1:35.4
2002	Tanino Gimlet	3	T1600	Yutaka Take	Kunihide Matsuda	Yuzo Tanimizu	1:34.8
2003	Silent Deal	3	T1600	Yutaka Take	Yasuo Ikee	Makoto Kaneko	1:34.8
2004	Great Journey	3	T1600	Yutaka Take	Yasuo Ikee	North Hills Management Ltd.	1:35.4
2005	Peer Gynt	3	T1600	Yutaka Take	Kojiro Hashiguchi	Sunday Racing Ltd.	1:35.7
2006	Go Go Kirishima	3	T1600	Mamoru Ishibashi	Yasuo Umeda	Shinichiro Nishimura	1:34.4
2007	Admire Aura	3	T1600	Yasunari Iwata	Hiroyoshi Matsuda	Riichi Kondo	1:35.1
2008	Dream Signal	3	T1600	Yasunari Iwata	Masato Nishizono	Saison Race Horse Co. Ltd.	1:35.4
2009	Antonio Barows	3	T1600	Koichi Tsunoda	Hiroshi Takeda	Hiroji Inokuma	1:35.3
2010	Garbo	3	T1600	Kenichi Ikezoe	Hidekatsu Shimizu	Kazuyoshi Ishikawa	1:34.3
2011	Red Davis	3	T1600	Suguru Hamanaka	Hidetaka Otonashi	Tokyo Horse Racing Co. Ltd.	1:34.0
2012	Gentildonna	3	T1600	Christophe Lemaire	Sei Ishizaka	Sunday Racing Ltd.	1:34.3
2013	A Shin Top	3	T1600	Suguru Hamanaka	Masato Nishizono	Eishindo Co. Ltd.	1:34.3
2014	Mikki Isle	3	T1600	Suguru Hamanaka	Hidetaka Otonashi	Mizuki Noda	1:33.8
2015	Guanciale	3	T1600	Yutaka Take	Yoshihito Kidate	Toshihiro Matsumoto	1:34.8
2016	Logi Cry	3	T1600	Suguru Hamanaka	Naosuke Sugai	Masaaki Kumeda	1:34.1
2017	Kyohei	3	T1600	Ryo Takakura	Hiroshi Miyamoto	Takao Seya	1:37.6
2018	Almond Eye	3	T1600	Keita Tosaki	Sakae Kunieda	Silk Racing Ltd.	1:37.1
2019	Val d'Isere	3	T1600	Yuichi Kitamura	Kunihiko Watanabe	G1 Racing Co. Ltd.	1:35.7
2020	Sanctuaire	3	T1600	Christophe Lemaire	Kazuo Fujisawa	Carrot Farm Ltd.	1:35.9
2021^{[a]}	Pixie Knight	3	T1600	Yuichi Fukunaga	Hidetaka Otonashi	Silk Racing Ltd.	1:33.3
2022^{[a]}	Matenro Orion	3	T1600	Norihiro Yokoyama	Mitsuku Kon	Chiyono Terada	1:34.1
2023^{[a]}	Light Quantum	3	T1600	Yutaka Take	Koshiro Take	Shadai Race Horse Ltd.	1:33.7
2024	Noble Roger	3	T1600	Yuga Kawada	Tatsuya Yoshioka	Normandy Thoroughbred Racing Co. Ltd.	1:34.5
2025^{[b]}	Lila Emblem	3	T1600	Suguru Hamanaka	Koshiro Take	G Riviere Racing Co. Ltd.	1:34.6
2026	Thunderstruck	3	T1600	Thore Hammer-Hansen	Tetsuya Kimura	Carrot Farm Ltd.	1:33.4

^{a} The Runnings from 2021 to 2023 were held at Chukyo Racecourse due to construction at Kyoto Racecourse.
^{b} The 2025 running was held at Chukyo Racecourse due to construction at Hanshin Racecourse.

== Gallerie ==
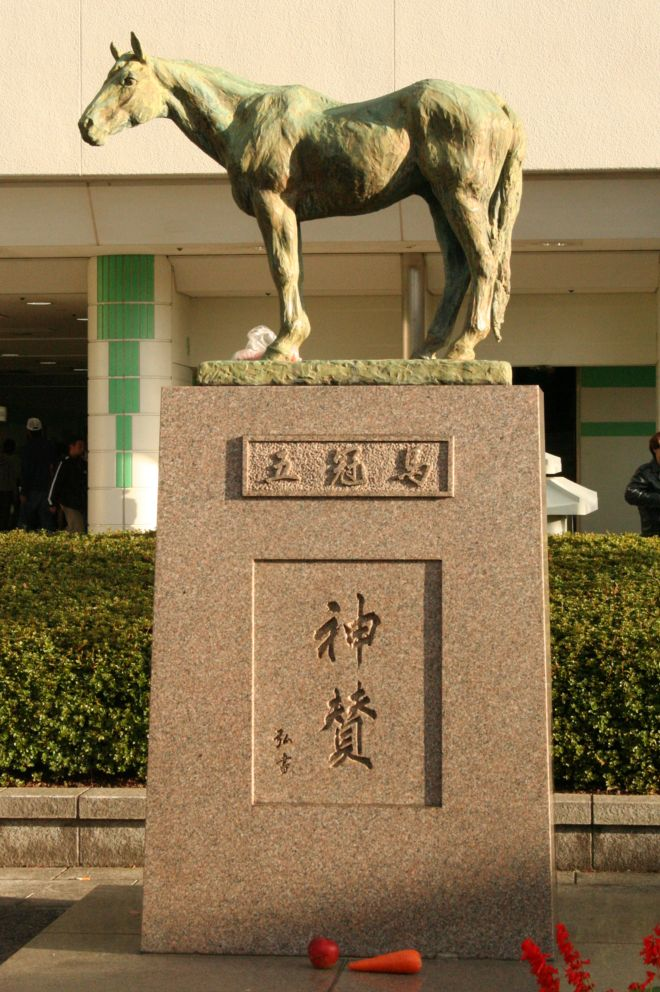
Statue of Shinzan

== See also ==
- Horse racing in Japan
- List of Japanese flat horse races

=== Netkeiba ===
- 1967 en, 1968 en, 1969 en, 1970 en, 1971 en, 1972 en, 1973 en, 1974 en, 1975 en, 1976 en, 1977 en, 1978 en, 1979 en, 1980 en, 1981 en, 1982 en, 1983 en, 1984 en, 1985 en, 1986 en, 1987 en, 1988 en, 1989 en, 1990 en, 1991 en, 1992 en, 1993 en, 1994 en, 1995 en, 1996 en, 1997 en, 1998 en, 1999 en, 2000 en, 2001 en, 2002 en, 2003 en, 2004 en, 2005 en, 2006 en, 2007 en, 2008 en, 2009 en, 2010 en, 2011 en, 2012 en, 2013 en, 2014 en, 2015 en, 2016 en, 2017 en, 2018 en, 2019 en, 2020 en, 2021 en, 2022 en, 2023 en, 2024 en, 2025 en, 2026 en
