= Kakitsubata Kinen =

Kakitsubata Kinen かきつばた記念
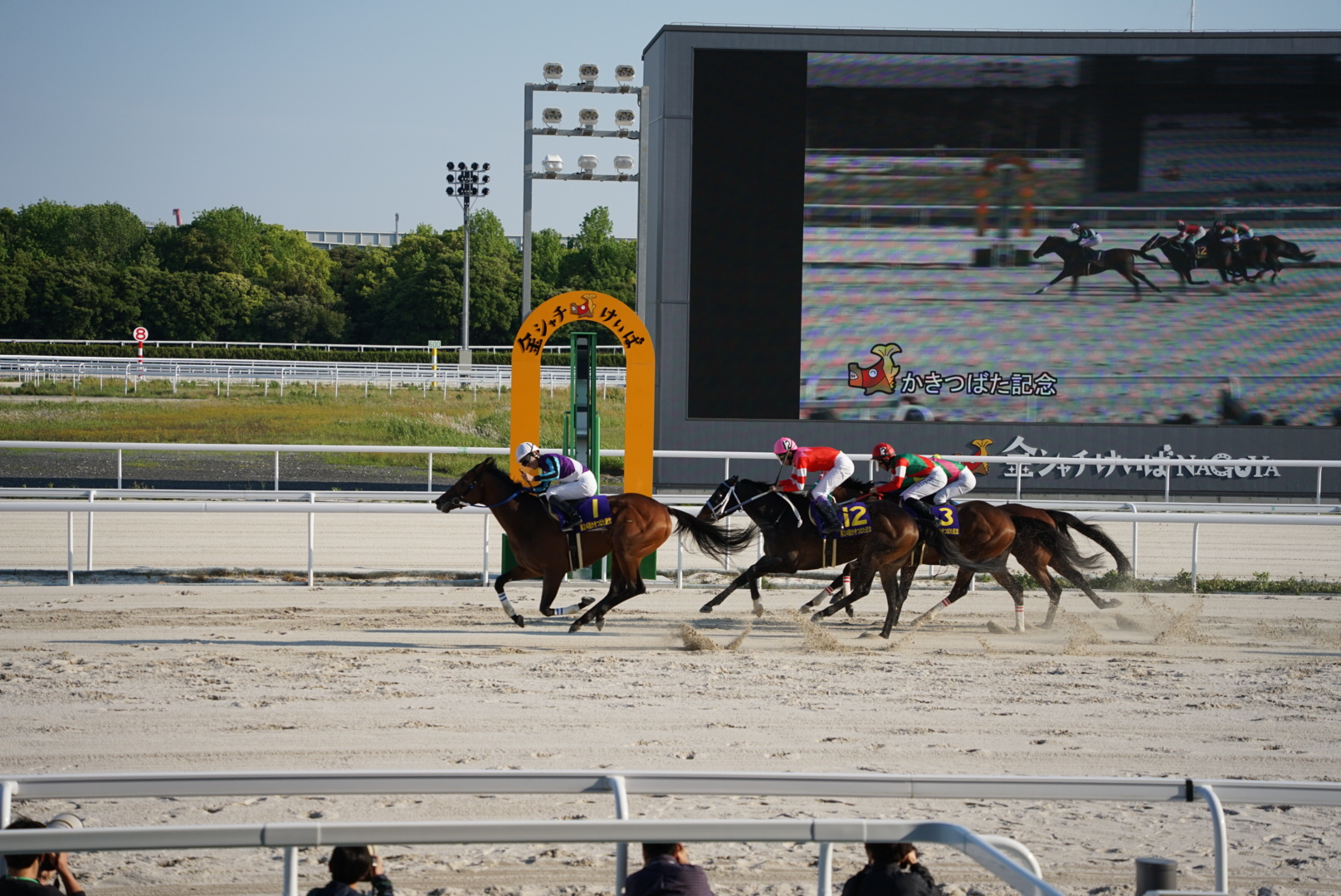
- The 24th Kakitsubata Kinen (2022); Winner: Igniter
- Class: Domestic Grade III (JpnIII) / International Listed
- Location: Nagoya Racecourse
- Inaugurated: May 4, 1999
- Race type: Thoroughbred Flat racing

Race information
- Distance: 1500 metres
- Surface: Dirt
- Track: Left-handed
- Qualification: 4-y-o and older (JRA/NAR exchange)
- Weight: Grade-based: 57 kg (55 kg for fillies)
- Purse: ¥ 54,300,000 (as of 2026); 1st: ¥ 30,000,000; 2nd: ¥ 10,500,000; 3rd: ¥ 6,000,000

The Kakitsubata Kinen (かきつばた記念) is a dirt Grade III (JpnIII) flat horse race in Japan, organized by the Aichi Prefecture Racing Association and held at Nagoya Racecourse. Since 2024, the official name is the Chunichi Shimbun Hai Kakitsubata Kinen (中日新聞杯 かきつばた記念), with the Chunichi Shimbun newspaper providing the winner's trophy.

The race is named after the kakitsubata (燕子花), the prefectural flower of Aichi Prefecture.

== Overview ==
The Kakitsubata Kinen was established in 1999 as a nationally designated exchange graded stakes race for JRA and NAR horses. From the 1st to the 23rd edition, it was run over 1,400 metres at the former Nagoya Racecourse. Since 2022, following the relocation of Nagoya Racecourse, the distance has been 1,500 metres. Since 2024, it is run annually in late February.

=== Conditions and prize money (2026) ===
Eligibility
Thoroughbreds aged 4 years and older (JRA and NAR exchange). The winner of the Umidzuki Hai receives priority entry.
Weight
Grade-based. Base weight 57 kg (55 kg for fillies). GI/JpnI winners carry an additional 3 kg, GII/JpnII winners 2 kg, GIII/JpnIII winners 1 kg.
Prize money
1st: ¥30,000,000; 2nd: ¥10,500,000; 3rd: ¥6,000,000; 4th: ¥4,500,000; 5th: ¥3,000,000; 6th and below: ¥300,000
Subsidiary prizes
Chunichi Shimbun Award, JRA Chairman's Award, Japan Horse Owners' Association Federation Chairman's Encouragement Award, NAR Chairman's Award, NAR Breeding Farm Award, Japan Local Racing Horse Owners' Promotion Association Chairman's Award, Aichi Prefecture Horse Owners' Association Chairman's Award, Aichi Prefecture Racing Association Administrator's Award, Race Steward Chairman's Award.

== History ==
- 1999 – Established as a nationally designated exchange graded stakes (Unified GIII) for horses aged 5 to 10 years.
- 2001 – Age condition changed to "4 to 9 years" following the international standardization of horse age notation.
- 2004 – Eligibility changed to "4 years and older."
- 2007 – Grade notation changed to JpnIII following Japan's promotion to Part I country status.
- 2017 – Weight conditions changed from grade-based to handicap.
- 2020 – Held without spectators due to the COVID-19 pandemic and the state of emergency declared under the Special Measures Act.
- 2022 – Distance changed from 1,400 m to 1,500 m following the relocation of Nagoya Racecourse. Total betting turnover of ¥962,160,400 set a new record for the race.
- 2024 – As part of the nationwide dirt racing system reform, the race was moved from early May to late February, weight conditions were changed from handicap back to grade-based, and the official name was changed to "Chunichi Shimbun Hai Kakitsubata Kinen."
- 2026 – Base weight set at 57 kg (55 kg for fillies).

== Past winners ==
All editions run on dirt. Editions 1–23 held at the former Nagoya Racecourse (1,400 m); editions 24–28 held at the current Nagoya Racecourse (1,500 m).

Ed.	Date	Course	Dist.	Winner	Sex/Age	Org.	Time	Jockey	Trainer	Owner
1	1999-05-04	Nagoya	1400m	Meisho Motonari	C5	JRA	1:26.2	Yasuhiko Yasuda	Isao Yasuda	Yoshio Matsumoto
2	2000-05-04	Nagoya	1400m	Gold Tiara	F4	JRA	1:26.1	Yutaka Take	Kunihide Matsuda	Kazuko Yoshida
3	2001-05-03	Nagoya	1400m	Broad Appeal	F7	JRA	R1:25.5	Kent Desormeaux	Kunihide Matsuda	Makoto Kaneko
4	2002-05-06	Nagoya	1400m	South Vigorous	C6	JRA	R1:23.9	Yoshitomi Shibata	Yasutaka Takahashi	Hisashi Nanba
5	2003-05-01	Nagoya	1400m	Biwa Shinseiki	C5	JRA	1:25.5	Norihiro Yokoyama	Hiroshi Matsuda	Biwa Co. Ltd.
6	2004-05-03	Nagoya	1400m	Maruka Senryo	C6	Nagoya	1:25.0	Minoru Yoshida	Satoru Setoguchi	Kazuko Onishi
7	2005-05-03	Nagoya	1400m	Yoshino Ichibanboshi	C4	Nagoya	1:27.2	Minoru Yoshida	Isao Nishiki	Masaaki Noda
8	2006-05-03	Nagoya	1400m	Rocky Appeal	C8	Kawasaki	1:27.2	Seiji Yamazaki	Hiroyoshi Yamazaki	Makoto Kaneko
9	2007-05-03	Nagoya	1400m	Meisho Butler	F7	JRA	1:27.8	Yutaka Take	Shigetada Takahashi	Yoshio Matsumoto
10	2008-05-06	Nagoya	1400m	Kongo Rikishio	C6	JRA	1:27.1	Shinji Fujita	Kenji Yamauchi	Hisao Kanaoka
11	2009-05-04	Nagoya	1400m	Smart Falcon	C4	JRA	1:25.5	Yasunari Iwata	Ken Ozaki	Toru Okawa
12	2010-05-03	Nagoya	1400m	Smart Falcon	C5	JRA	1:25.3	Yasunari Iwata	Ken Ozaki	Toru Okawa
13	2011-05-03	Nagoya	1400m	Sei Crimson	C5	JRA	1:25.9	Hideaki Miyuki	Toshiyuki Hattori	Shigeki Kaneda
14	2012-05-04	Nagoya	1400m	Sei Crimson	C6	JRA	1:26.1	Yasunari Iwata	Toshiyuki Hattori	Shigeki Kaneda
15	2013-04-29	Nagoya	1400m	T Up Wild	C7	JRA	1:26.4	Shu Ishibashi	Katsuichi Nishiura	Noboru Tanaka
16	2014-04-29	Nagoya	1400m	Tagano Zingaro	C7	Hyogo	1:27.2	Ken Kimura	Masashi Atarashi	Hideyuki Yagi
17	2015-05-04	Nagoya	1400m	Corin Berry	F4	JRA	1:25.1	Kohei Matsuyama	Masami Shibata	Keiko Ito
18	2016-05-03	Nagoya	1400m	Nobo Baccara	C4	JRA	1:27.0	Mirco Demuro	Shoichi Tenma	LS.M Co. Ltd.
19	2017-05-03	Nagoya	1400m	Tokei Tiger	C6	Hyogo	1:26.8	Shoichi Kawahara	Asao Sumiyoshi	Nobuhiko Kimura
20	2018-04-30	Nagoya	1400m	Success Energy	C4	JRA	1:25.9	Kohei Matsuyama	Naruhito Kitade	Tetsu Takashima
21	2019-05-01	Nagoya	1400m	Gold Queen	F4	JRA	1:25.1	Yoshihiro Furukawa	Tomoyasu Sakaguchi	Mitsuhiko Kato
22	2020-05-04	Nagoya	1400m	Raptus	G4	JRA	1:25.3	Hideaki Miyuki	Masahiro Matsunaga	Hidaka Breeders Union
23	2021-05-03	Nagoya	1400m	Raptus	G5	JRA	1:25.2	Hideaki Miyuki	Masahiro Matsunaga	Hidaka Breeders Union
24	2022-05-03	Nagoya	1500m	Igniter	C4	Hyogo	R1:31.8	Manabu Tanaka	Masashi Atarashi	Yoshimi Noda
25	2023-05-02	Nagoya	1500m	Wilson Tesoro	C4	JRA	R1:31.1	Yuga Kawada	Hitoshi Kotegawa	Ryotokuji Kenji Holdings
26	2024-02-29	Nagoya	1500m	Sunrise Hawk	G5	JRA	1:32.6	Mirco Demuro	Mitsunori Makiura	Life House Co. Ltd.
27	2025-02-24	Nagoya	1500m	Lord Fons	C5	JRA	1:33.5	Kazuo Yokoyama	Shogo Yasuda	Lord Horse Club
28	2026-02-23	Nagoya	1500m	Danon Figo	C4	JRA	1:32.2	Yuga Kawada	Yasuo Tomomichi	Danox Co. Ltd.

- R = course record

== See also ==
- Horse racing in Japan
- List of Japanese flat horse races
- Procyon Stakes
- Hokkaido Sprint Cup
