= Kyōto Kinen =

Kyōto Kinen 京都記念
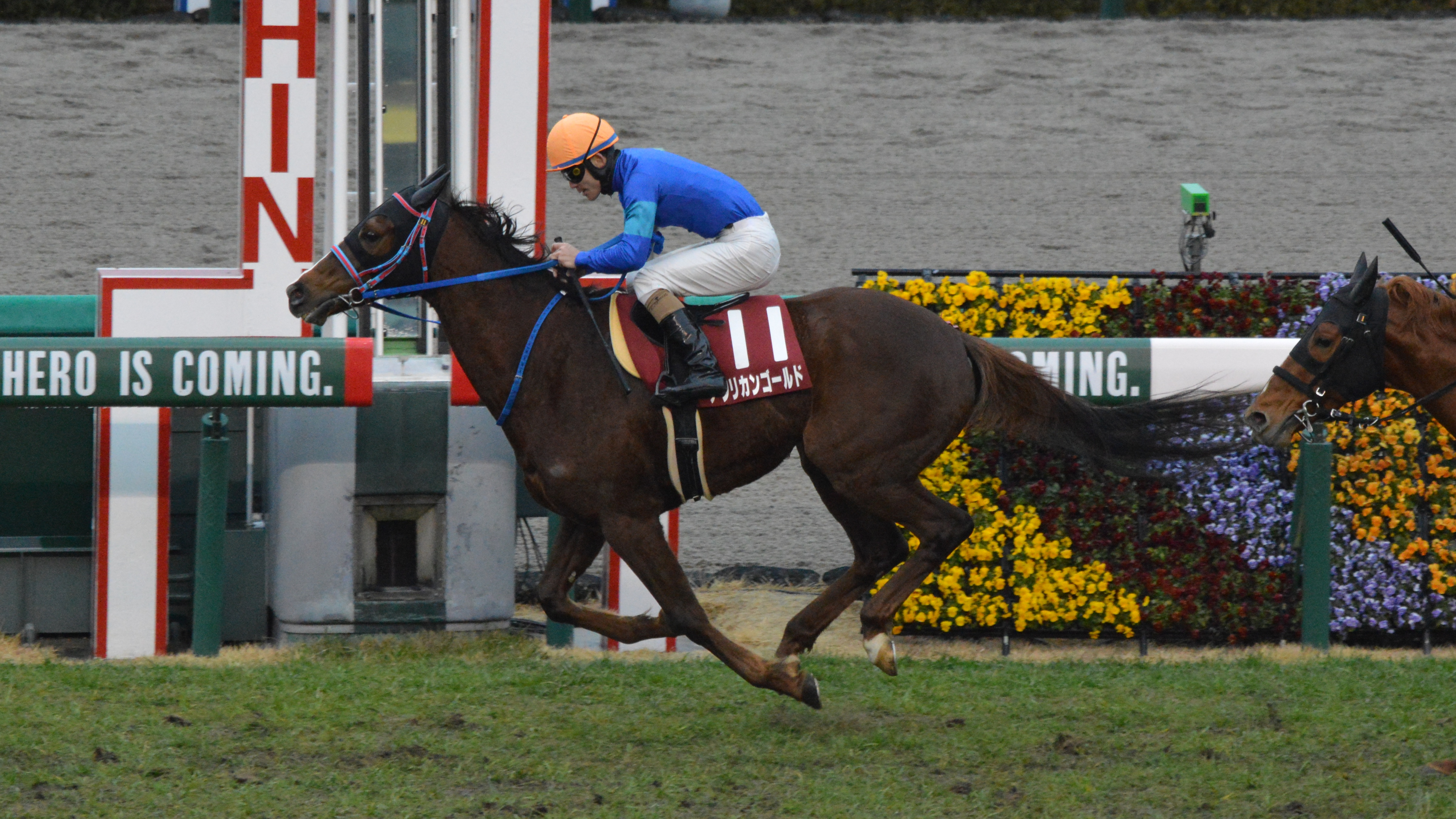
- African Gold winning the Kyoto Kinen in 2022
- Class: Grade 2
- Location: Kyoto Racecourse, Kyoto, Kyoto, Japan
- Inaugurated: May 17, 1942
- Race type: Thoroughbred Flat racing
- Website: japanracing.jp/

Race information
- Distance: 2200 meters
- Surface: Turf
- Track: Right-handed
- Qualification: 4-y-o & Up, Thoroughbreds
- Weight: Special Weight
- Purse: ¥ 134,620,000 (as of 2026): 1st: ¥ 62,000,000; 2nd: ¥ 25,000,000; 3rd: ¥ 16,000,000

The Kyōto Kinen (京都記念, Kyōto Kinen) is a Grade II race in Japan that is open to international horses. It is held in mid-February at Kyoto Racecourse in Kyoto, Japan.

The race was first run in 1942. It was not run from 1944 to 1947 due to World War II. Initially, the race was run over 3,500 metres (about 2 miles or 1.5 furlongs) and the present race is run over 2,200 metres (about 11 furlongs).

Kyōto Kinen has been rated as a Grade II race since 1984 and was opened for foreign-trained horses at that time, although foreign horses did not run the race until recently.

It is a popular prep race for the Spring Tenno Sho. Takeshiba O, Ten Point, Biwa Hayahide and T. M. Opera O are horses that won both the Kyōto Kinen and the Tenno Sho. Some horses run this race before going to Dubai. In 2007, Admire Moon won this race and the Dubai Duty Free.

== Weight ==
56 kg for four-year-olds, 57 kg for five-year-olds and above.

Allowances:

- 2 kg for fillies / mares
- 1 kg for southern hemisphere bred four-year-olds

Penalties (excluding two-year-old race performance):

- If a graded stakes race has been won within a year:
  - 2 kg for a grade 1 win (1 kg for fillies / mares)
  - 1 kg for a grade 2 win
- If a graded stakes race has been won for more than a year:
  - 1 kg for a grade1 win

== Autumn part ==
Initially, Kyōto Kinen was held twice a year in spring and autumn. The autumn race was abolished 1984 when Japanese domestic race grading was started.

Before the autumn part was abolished, some horses ran both races and five horses won both. Notably, Final Score (1954) and Sky Leader (1974) won both races in the same year.

== Results and records ==
=== Most wins by a horse ===
- Satono Crown (2016, 2017)

=== Most wins by a jockey ===
- 5 – Yutaka Take (2006, 2007, 2012, 2013, 2023)

=== Most wins by a trainer ===
- 5 – Hiroyoshi Matsuda (2001, 2006, 2007, 2008, 2010)

=== Most wins by an owner ===
- 3 – Sunday Racing (2010, 2019, 2020)

=== Record winning time ===
- 2:11.5 Lovely Day (2015) (Kyoto)
- 2:10.4 Loves Only You (2021) (Hanshin)

== List of recent winners ==
Year	Winner	Age	Jockey	Trainer	Owner	Time
2000	T. M. Opera O	4	Ryuji Wada	Ichizō Iwamoto	Masatsugu Takezono	2:13.8
2001	Maquereau	4	Yasuhiko Yasuda	Hiroyoshi Matsuda	Katsumi Yoshida	2:12.3
2002	Narita Top Road	6	Kunihiko Watanabe	Yoshio Oki	Hidenori Yamaji	2:11.8
2003	My Sole Sound	4	Masaru Honda	Katsuichi Nishiura	Kiyoshi Sano	2:16.5
2004	Silk Famous	5	Hirofumi Shii	Ippo Sameshima	Silk Co. Ltd.	2:12.8
2005	Narita Century	6	Hirokazu Tajima	Norio Fujisawa	Hidenori Yamaji	2:15.7
2006	Six Sense	4	Yutaka Take	Hiroyuki Nagahama	Shadai Race Horse	2:13.5
2007	Admire Moon	4	Yutaka Take	Hiroyoshi Matsuda	Riichi Kondō & Katsumi Yoshida	2:17.2
2008	Admire Aura	4	Katsumi Andō	Hiroyoshi Matsuda	Riichi Kondō	2:13.6
2009	Asakusa Kings	5	Hirofumi Shii	Ryūji Ōkubo	Keiko Tahara	2:14.6
2010	Buena Vista	4	Norihiro Yokoyama	Hiroyoshi Matsuda	Sunday Racing Co. Ltd.	2:14.4
2011	To the Glory	4	Umberto Rispoli	Yasuo Ikee	Carrot Farm	2:13.9
2012	Trailblazer	5	Yutaka Take	Yasuo Ikee	Yoko Maeda	2:12.4
2013	Tosen Ra	5	Yutaka Take	Hideaki Fujiwara	Takaya Shimakawa	2:12.5
2014	Desperado	6	Norihiro Yokoyama	Akio Adachi	Hiroyuki Tanaka	2:16.0
2015	Lovely Day	5	Keita Tosaki	Yasutoshi Ikee	Makoto Kaneko	2:11.5
2016	Satono Crown	4	Mirco Demuro	Noriyuki Hori	Hajime Satomi	2:17.7
2017	Satono Crown	5	Mirco Demuro	Noriyuki Hori	Hajime Satomi	2:14.1
2018	Clincher	4	Yusuke Fujioka	Hiroshi Miyamoto	Koji Maeda	2:16.3
2019	Danburite	5	Fuma Matsuwaka	Hidetaka Otonashi	Sunday Racing	2:14.8
2020	Chrono Genesis	4	Yuichi Kitamura	Takashi Saito	Sunday Racing	2:16.4
2021	Loves Only You^{[a]}	5	Yuga Kawada	Yoshito Yahagi	DMM Dream Club	2:10.4
2022	African Gold^{[a]}	7	Kyosuke Kokubun	Masato Nishizono	Godolphin	2:11.9
2023	Do Deuce^{[a]}	4	Yutaka Take	Yasuo Tomomichi	Kieffers Co. Ltd.	2:10.9
2024	Pradaria	5	Kenichi Ikezoe	Manabu Ikezoe	Nagoya Yuho Co. Ltd.	2:12.1
2025	Yoho Lake	7	Mirai Iwata	Yasuo Tomomichi	Kaneko Makoto Holdings Co. Ltd.	2:15.7
2026	June Take	5	Yusuke Fujioka	Hidenori Take	Jun Yoshikawa	2:12.7

^{a} The 2021, 2022 and 2023 runnings took place at Hanshin while Kyoto was closed for renovation.

== Previous Winners ==
- 1942 - Marues
- 1943 - Hayatake
- 1944 - no race
- 1945 - no race
- 1946 - no race
- 1947 - no race
- 1948 - Matsu Midori
- 1949 - Hamakaze
- 1950 - Nishitatsupu
- 1951 - Owens
- 1952 - Sachihomare
- 1953 - Kiyo Strong
- 1954 - Final Score
- 1955 - Sekaiichi
- 1956 - Sekai O
- 1957 - Takakura O
- 1958 - Rising Winner
- 1959 - Iriyu
- 1960 - Fusari Yu
- 1961 - Tygon O
- 1962 - Marni Roll
- 1963 - Motoichi
- 1964 - Ryu Forel
- 1965 - Young Hero
- 1966 - Hatsurai O
- 1967 - Yamaniryu
- 1968 - Nihon Pillow Homare
- 1969 - Takeshiba O
- 1970 - Yokozuna
- 1971 - Continental
- 1972 - Shunsaku Ryu
- 1973 - Hamano Parade
- 1974 - Skyleader
- 1975 - Tanino Chikara
- 1976 - Nara Sanzan
- 1977 - Ten Point
- 1978 - Elimo George
- 1979 - Koichi Saburo
- 1980 - Agnes Lady
- 1981 - Robinson City
- 1982 - Arena O
- 1983 - Masahiko Boy
- 1984 - Kyoei Ascent
- 1985 - Mejiro Thomas
- 1986 - Suda Hawk
- 1987 - Shin Chest
- 1988 - Kashima Wing
- 1989 - Dyna Carpenter
- 1990 - Nice Nice Nice
- 1991 - Prince Shin
- 1992 - Osumi Roch
- 1993 - Paris Harley
- 1994 - Biwa Hayahide
- 1995 - Wako Chikako
- 1996 - T.M. Jumbo
- 1997 - Yutosei
- 1998 - Midnight Bet
- 1999 - Emocion

== See also ==
- Horse racing in Japan
- List of Japanese flat horse races
