= Keisei Hai =

Keisei Hai 京成杯
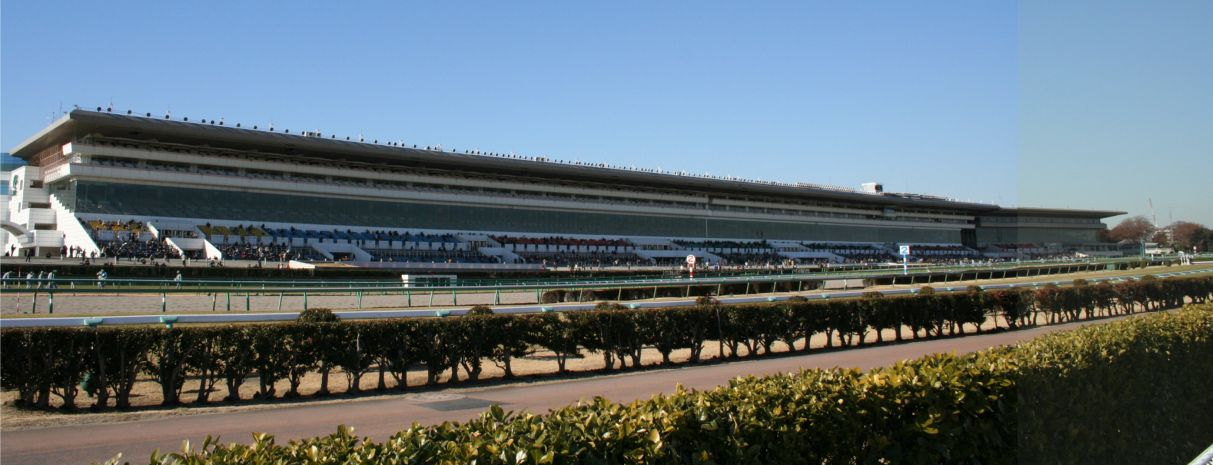
- Nakayama Racecourse Grandstand
- Class: Grade 3
- Location: Nakayama Racecourse
- Inaugurated: January 15, 1961
- Race type: Thoroughbred Flat racing

Race information
- Distance: 2000 metres
- Surface: Turf
- Track: Right-handed
- Qualification: 3-y-o
- Weight: 57 kg, fillies allowed 2 kg
- Purse: ¥ 87,960,000 (as of 2026): 1st: ¥ 41,000,000; 2nd: ¥ 16,000,000; 3rd: ¥ 10,000,000

The Keisei Hai (京成杯) is a Grade 3 (GIII) flat horse race in Japan.

== Background ==
The Keisei Hai is a Grade III Thoroughbred race in Japan open to 3-year-old horses of either sex. It is held annually in mid-January at Nakayama Racecourse over a distance of 2,000 meters on turf (inner course). Eligible entrants must have raced at least once and cannot be unraced or maiden horses. The field includes JRA-trained horses, up to two certified NAR (local) horses, and foreign-trained horses with priority entry. The race is run under weight-for-age conditions: colts and geldings carry 57 kg, while fillies carry 55 kg. The first-place prize in 2026 was ¥41 million.

The race is officially titled the “Keisei Hai”, named after its sponsor, Keisei Electric Railway, which operates the Keisei Main Line serving Nakayama Racecourse. The winner receives the Keisei Electric Railway Co., Ltd. Prize. The race is particularly valued as a preparatory step for the Satsuki Sho (Japanese 2000 Guineas), the first race of Japan’s Triple Crown, which takes place in April over the same 2,000-meter distance at Nakayama.

== History ==
The Keisei Hai was inaugurated on January 15, 1961, as a 4-year-old (now 3-year-old) restricted stakes race over 1,600 meters on turf (outer course) at Nakayama Racecourse. In 1999, as part of a JRA-wide restructuring of 3-year-old race distances, the event was extended to 2,000 meters and moved to the inner turf course, aligning it with the Satsuki Sho (Japanese 2000 Guineas). The race was designated Grade III in 1984 with the introduction of JRA’s official grading system.

International participation expanded gradually: foreign-bred horses were allowed from 1984, NAR horses from 1996, and foreign-trained horses from 2009, when it became an international GIII event, initially with 8 foreign runners, later increased to 9 in 2015. Due to external factors, the race has occasionally been relocated: it was held at Tokyo Racecourse from 1970 to 1978 and again in 1996 and 2002, primarily due to scheduling adjustments. The 1972 edition was postponed to March due to an outbreak of equine influenza.

In 2024, the race formally adopted fixed weight-for-age (57/55 kg), standardizing conditions for all entrants.

== Past winners ==
Year	Winner	Age	Length (in m)	Jockey	Trainer	Owner	Time
1961	Monte Carlo	3	T1600	Seisuke Sato	Shiro Akiyama	Kihachi Mouri	1:40.6
1962	O Hayabusa	3	T1600	Katsuhiko Fujimoto	Tomiyoshi Fujimoto	Masahiko Kasagi	1:39.8
1963	Kane no Hikaru	3	T1600	Takemi Kaga	Shotaro Abe	Yoshiaki Kanesashi	1:37.5
1964	Tokino Parade	3	T1600	Yoshio Nohira	Kazuo Tanaka	Suzuichi Iguchi	1:40.5
1965	Mejiro Mangetsu	3	T1600	Takemi Kaga	Shotaro Abe	Toyokichi Kitano	1:38.5
1966	Speed Symboli	3	T1600	Akira Tsuda	Tomihisa Nohira	Tomohiro Wada	1:40.2
1967	Hougetsu O	3	T1600	Takehisa Kaga	Sueji Yamaoka	Yoshizo Shimazu	1:39.3
1968	Light World	3	T1600	Hiroshi Higuchi	Suetaro Mitsui	Gengo Okubo	1:39.6
1969	Gallop	3	T1600	Yuji Nohira	Shiro Akayama	Nobuko Enomoto	1:39.2
1970	Arrow Express	3	T1600	Masato Shibata	Santa Takamatsu	Hidekazu Date	1:37.1
1971	Yashima Raiden	3	T1600	Masanori Ito	Tokichi Ogata	Shohei Kobayashi	1:38.1
1972	Hide Hayate	3	T1600	Yoichi Fukunaga	Shuji Ito	Hideo Ito	1:35.8
1973	Kamino Tesio	3	T1600	Takemi Kaga	Hideo Takahashi	Masayasu Hotehama	1:37.2
1974	Western Dash	3	T1600	Masanori Ito	Tokichi Ogata	Nishikawa Shoji Co. Ltd.	1:36.9
1975	Tesco Gabby	3	T1600	Yasuo Sugawara	Yoshio Nakazumi	Tadao Nagashima	1:37.5
1976	Climb Kaiser	3	T1600	Takehisa Kaga	Yoshiaki Sato	Mito Co. Ltd.	1:36.4
1977	Hishi Speed	3	T1600	Futoshi Kojima	Yoshio Takagi	Masanobu Abe	1:36.7
1978	Take Den	3	T1600	Yukio Okabe	Takaaki Motoishi	Denichi Takeichi	1:37.1
1979	First Ammon	3	T1600	Masato Yoshinaga	Kichisaburo Matsuyama	Ichi Sugaura	1:37.3
1980	Harbour Shade	3	T1600	Isao Shimada	Tsuguyoshi Sasaki	Harbor Co. Ltd.	1:42.1
1981	Tenmon	3	T1600	Isao Shimada	Yukio Inaba	Hachie Hara	1:36.8
1982	Aswan	3	T1600	Masato Yoshinaga	Kichisaburo Matsuyama	Zenya Yoshida	1:36.7
1983	Blue Durban	3	T1600	Hiroaki Sugiura	Toshio Nihonyanagi	Tokusuke Fukushima	1:37.7
1984	Hatsuno Amoi	3	T1600	Yasutomo Sugawara	Yoshio Nakamura	Hatsutaro Nakagawa	1:36.2
1985	Sakura Sunny O	3	T1600	Futoshi Kojima	Katsutaro Sakai	Sakura Commerce Co. Ltd.	1:35.6
1986	Dyna Fairy	3	T1600	Sueo Masuzawa	Yasuhiro Suzuki	Shadai Race Horse Ltd.	1:35.1
1987	Super Phantom	3	T1600	Masato Shibata	Mitsugu Nakamura	Masahiro Hiranoi	1:35.7
1988	Tosho Mario	3	T1600	Masato Shibata	Shinji Okuhira	Tosho Sangyo Co. Ltd.	1:35.4
1989	Speak Reason	3	T1600	Tomio Yasuda	Mitsuhiro Ogata	Mitsuru Takezaki	1:36.3
1990	No More Speedy	3	T1600	Tomio Yasuda	Yasuhisa Matsuyama	Teruya Yoshida	1:35.2
1991	Dynamite Daddy	3	T1600	Sueo Masuzawa	Yasuhiro Suzuki	Seiichi Ikeya	1:34.8
1992	A.P. Jet	3	T1600	Hitoshi Matoba	Takaaki Motoishi	Delmar Club Co. Ltd.	1:35.2
1993	Osumi Point	3	T1600	Hiroki Hashimoto	Toshiaki Shirai	Hidenori Yamaji	1:35.8
1994	Biko Pegasus	3	T1600	Hitoshi Matoba	Tsugio Yanagida	Legend Ltd.	1:33.9
1995	Mighty Force	3	T1600	Mikio Matsunaga	Keiji Kato	Diners Club Japan Co. Ltd.	1:35.1
1996	Sakura Speed O	3	T1600	Futoshi Kojima	Katsutaro Sakai	Sakura Commerce Co. Ltd.	1:34.6
1997	Speed World	3	T1600	Hitoshi Matoba	Kazuo Konishi	Ichikawa Real Estate Co. Ltd.	1:36.3
1998	Mandarin Star	3	T1600	Yoshitomi Shibata	Keiji Takachii	Eiichiro Okawa	1:36.8
1999	Osumi Bright	3	T2000	Masayoshi Ebina	Tadashi Nakao	Hidenori Yamaji	2:01.5
2000	Meiner Vintage	3	T2000	Yoshitomi Shibata	Shozo Sasaki	Thoroughbred Club Ruffian Co. Ltd.	2:04.0
2001	Born King	3	T2000	David Harrison	Kunihide Matsuda	Makoto Kaneko	2:03.2
2002 (dh)	Yamamin Seraphim	3	T2000	Koshiro Take	Taira Furukawa	Turf Sport Ltd.	2:00.4
2002 (dh)	Roman Empire	3	T2000	Masayoshi Ebina	Hidekazu Asami	Hajime Doi	2:00.4
2003	Suzuka Dream	3	T2000	Masayoshi Ebina	Mitsuru Hashida	Keiji Nagai	2:01.7
2004	Focal Point	3	T2000	Norihiro Yokoyama	Michifumi Kono	Shadai Race Horse Ltd.	1:59.2
2005	Admire Japan	3	T2000	Norihiro Yokoyama	Hiroyoshi Matsuda	Riichi Kondo	2:07.4
2006	Jalisco Light	3	T2000	Hiroshi Kitamura	Kazuo Fujisawa	Kazumi Yoshida	2:03.2
2007	Sun Zeppelin	3	T2000	Masami Matsuoka	Makoto Saito	Nobuyuki Kato	2:01.6
2008	Meiner Charles	3	T2000	Masami Matsuoka	Ryuichi Inaba	Thoroughbred Club Ruffian Co. Ltd.	2:02.9
2009	Early Robusto	3	T2000	Yuichi Fukunaga	Masaru Honda	Mishima Bokujo	2:02.7
2010	Eishin Flash	3	T2000	Norihiro Yokoyama	Hideaki Fujiwara	Toyomitsu Hirai	2:03.6
2011	Fateful War	3	T2000	Katsuhara Tanaka	Shinichi Ito	Shadai Race Horse Ltd.	2:00.9
2012	Best Deal	3	T2000	Norihiro Yokoyama	Sakae Kunieda	Shadai Race Horse Ltd.	2:00.6
2013	Fame Game	3	T2000	Fran Berry	Yoshitada Munakata	Sunday Racing Co. Ltd.	2:02.3
2014	Pray and Real	3	T2000	Daichi Shibata	Hiroaki Kawazu	Shigeyuki Okada	2:01.1
2015	Beruf	3	T2000	Yuga Kawada	Yasutoshi Ikee	Sunday Racing Co. Ltd.	2:02.3
2016	Prophet	3	T2000	Shane Foley	Yasutoshi Ikee	Carrot Racing Co. Ltd.	2:01.4
2017	Komano Impulse	3	T2000	Hironobu Tanabe	Masatatsu Kikukawa	Yoshinobu Hasegawa	2:02.5
2018	Generale Uno	3	T2000	Hironobu Tanabe	Eiichi Yano	G Riviere Racing Co. Ltd.	2:01.2
2019	Last Draft	3	T2000	Christophe Lemaire	Hirofumi Toda	Sunday Racing Co. Ltd.	2:01.2
2020	Crystal Black	3	T2000	Yutaka Yoshida	Fumimasa Takahashi	Isamu Okada	2:02.1
2021	Gratias	3	T2000	Christophe Lemaire	Yukihiro Kato	Three H Racing	2:03.1
2022	Onyankopon	3	T2000	Akira Sugawara	Shigeyuki Kojima	Kunio Tabara	2:01.3
2023	Sol Oriens	3	T2000	Takeshi Yokoyama	Takahisa Tezuka	Shadai Race Horse Ltd.	2:02.2
2024	Danon Decile	3	T2000	Norihiro Yokoyama	Shogo Yasuda	Danox Co. Ltd.	2:00.5
2025	Nishino Agent	3	T2000	Akihide Tsumura	Naoto Chiba	Shigeyuki Nishiyama	1:59.9
2026	Green Energy	3	T2000	Keita Tosaki	Yuki Uehara	Takafumi Suzue	1:59.3

== See also ==
- Horse racing in Japan
- List of Japanese flat horse races

=== Netkeiba ===
- 1994 en, 1995 en, 1996 en, 1997 en, 1998 en, 1999 en, 2000 en, 2001 en, 2002 en, 2003 en, 2004 en, 2005 en, 2006 en, 2007 en, 2008 en, 2009 en, 2010 en, 2011 en, 2012 en, 2013 en, 2014 en, 2015 en, 2016 en, 2017 en, 2018 en, 2019 en, 2020 en, 2021 en, 2022 en, 2023 en, 2024 en, 2025 en, 2026 en
