= Hanshin Juvenile Fillies =

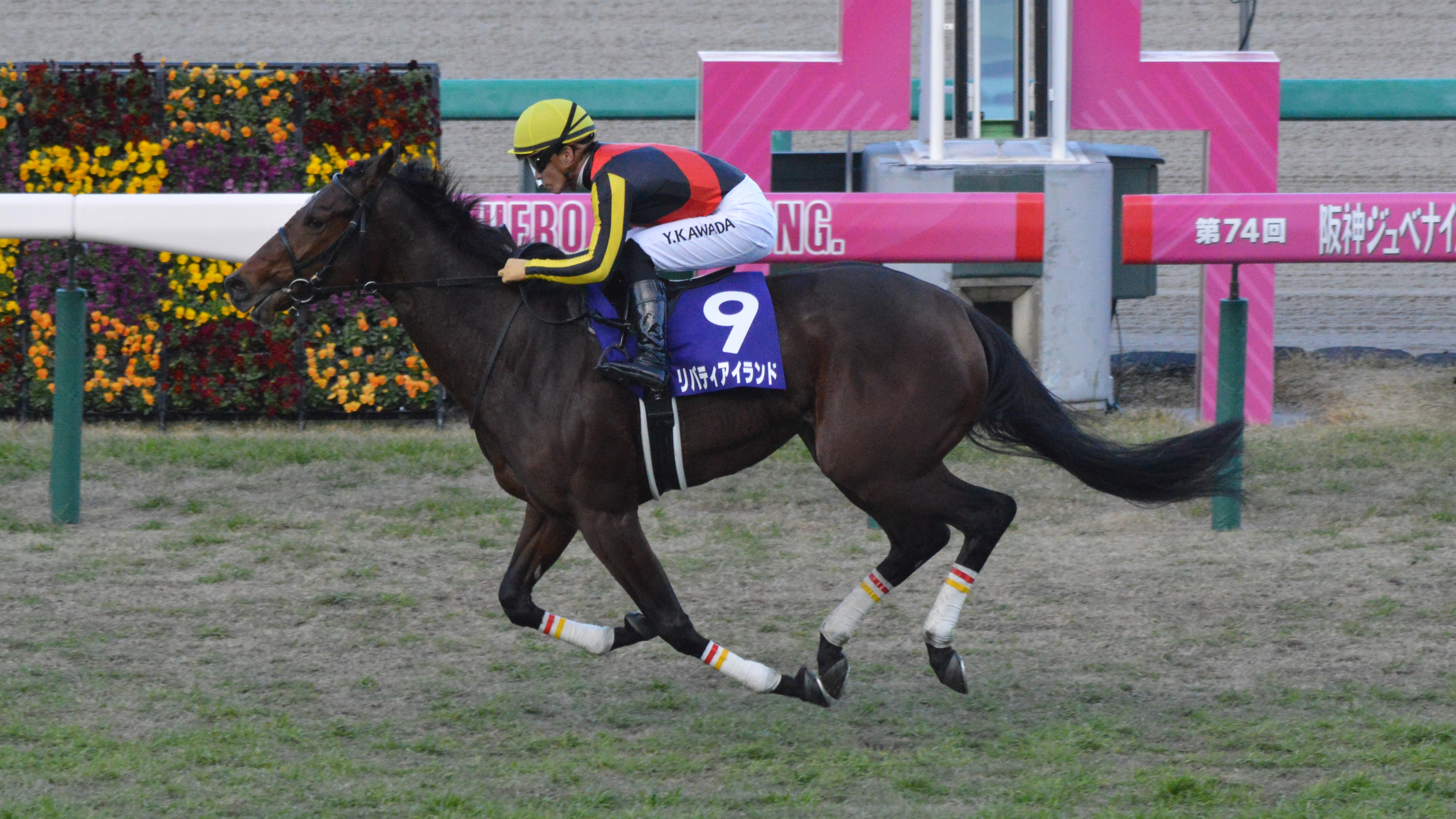
- 2022 Hanshin Juvenile Fillies winner Liberty Island
- Class: Grade 1
- Location: Hanshin Racecourse; Takarazuka, Hyogo, Japan
- Inaugurated: December 18, 1949
- Race type: Thoroughbred - Flat racing

Race information
- Distance: 1,600 meters (about 8 furlongs / one mile)
- Surface: Turf
- Track: Right-handed (outer course)
- Qualification: Two-Year-Old Fillies
- Weight: Northern Hemisphere-breds 55 kg (121 lbs); Southern Hemisphere-breds 52 kg (115 lbs)
- Purse: ¥ 140,200,000 (as of 2025): 1st: ¥ 65,000,000; 2nd: ¥ 26,000,000; 3rd: ¥ 16,000,000

The Hanshin Juvenile Fillies (阪神ジュベナイルフィリーズ) is a one-mile turf stakes race for thoroughbred fillies two years old. It is considered the de facto year-end championship for two-year-old fillies in Japan. Prior to 1991, the race was called the Hanshin Sansai Stakes and was not restricted in gender.

== Qualifying races ==
The two races below are designated qualifying races, where the horses that finish first and second in each place earn a slot in the race.

- Artemis Stakes
- Fantasy Stakes

== Winners ==
Year	Winner	Jockey	Trainer	Owner	Time
1991	Nishino Flower	Masao Sato	Masahiro Matsuda	Masayuki Nishiyama	1:36.2
1992	Suehiro Jo O	Hiromasa Tamogi	Takeshi Yoshinaga	Otojiro Kobayashi	1:37.9
1993	Hishi Amazon	Eiji Nakadate	Takayoshi Nakano	Masaichiro Abe	1:35.9
1994	Yamanin Paradise	Yutaka Take	Kunikazu Asami	Doi Shoji	1:34.7
1995	Biwa Heidi	Koichi Tsunoda	Mitsumasa Hamada	Biwa	1:35.3
1996	Mejiro Dober	Yutaka Yoshida	Yokichi Okubo	Mejiro Shoji Inc.	1:34.6
1997	Ein Bride	Yoshihiro Furukawa	Toru Miya	Miyoji Araki	1:35.8
1998	Stinger	Norihiro Yokoyama	Kazuo Fujisawa	Teruya Yoshida	1:37.0
1999	Yamakatsu Suzuran	Michael Kinane	Kaneo Ikezoe	Hiroyasu Yamada	1:35.6
2000	T. M. Ocean	Masaru Honda	Katsuichi Nishuira	Masatsugu Takezono	1:34.6
2001	Tamuro Cherry	Olivier Peslier	Masato Nishizono	Tamuro Taniguchi	1:35.1
2002	Peace of World	Yuichi Fukunaga	Masahiro Sakaguchi	Tadashi Iida	1:34.7
2003	Yamanin Sucre	Hirofumi Shii	Hidekazu Asami	Hajime Doi	1:35.9
2004	Shonan Peintre	Yutaka Yoshida	Yokichi Okubo	Tetsuhide Kunimoto	1:35.2
2005	T M Precure	Shigefumi Kumazawa	Tadao Igarashi	Masatsugu Takezono	1:37.3
2006	Vodka	Hirofumi Shii	Katsuhiko Sumii	Yuzo Tanimizu	1:33.1
2007	Tall Poppy	Kenichi Ikezoe	Katsuhiko Sumii	Carrot Farm	1:33.8
2008	Buena Vista	Katsumi Ando	Hiroyoshi Matsuda	Sunday Racing Co. Ltd	1:35.2
2009	Apapane	Masayoshi Ebina	Sakae Kunieda	Kaneko Makoto Holdings	1:34.9
2010	Reve d'Essor	Yuichi Fukunaga	Hiroyoshi Matsuda	Sunday Racing Co. Ltd	1:35.7
2011	Joie de Vivre	Yuichi Fukunaga	Hiroyoshi Matsuda	Sunday Racing Co. Ltd	1:34.9
2012	Robe Tissage	Shinichiro Akiyama	Naosuke Sugai	Silk Co. Ltd.	1:34.2
2013	Red Reveur	Keita Tosaki	Naosuke Sugai	Tokyo Horse Racing Co. Ltd	1:33.9
2014	Shonan Adela	Masayoshi Ebina	Yoshitaka Ninomiya	Tetsuhide Kunimoto	1:34.4
2015	Major Emblem	Christophe Lemaire	Yasuhito Tamura	Sunday Racing Co. Ltd	1:34.5
2016	Soul Stirring	Christophe Lemaire	Kazuo Fujisawa	Shadai Race Horse Co. Ltd	1:34.0
2017	Lucky Lilac	Shu Ishibashi	Mikio Matsunaga	Sunday Racing	1:34.3
2018	Danon Fantasy	Cristian Demuro	Mitsumasa Nakauchida	Danon Co Ltd	1:34.1
2019	Resistencia	Yuichi Kitamura	Takeshi Matsushita	U Carrot Farm	1:32.7
2020	Sodashi	Hayato Yoshida	Naosuke Sugai	Kaneko Makoto Holdings	1:33.1
2021	Circle of Life	Mirco Demuro	Sakae Kunieda	Masatake Iida	1:33.8
2022	Liberty Island	Yuga Kawada	Mitsumasa Nakauchida	Sunday Racing	1:33.1
2023	Ascoli Piceno	Hiroshi Kitamura	Yoichi Kuroiwa	Sunday Racing	1:32.6
2024^{[a]}	Arma Veloce	Mirai Iwata	Hiroyuki Uemura	Teruo Ono	1:33.4
2025	Star Anise	Kohei Matsuyama	Tomokazu Takano	Katsumi Yoshida	1:32.6^{[b]}

- ^{a} The 2024 running took place at Kyoto while Hanshin was closed for a year due to a grandstand renovation.
- ^{b} Set the current race record

== Previous Winners ==
- 1949 - Wizard
- 1950 - Mineharu
- 1951 - Iron Flower
- 1952 - Wakakusa
- 1953 - Yashima Apollo
- 1954 - Raiden Oh
- 1955 - Tosamore
- 1956 - Miss Onward
- 1957 - Meiji Midori
- 1958 - International
- 1959 - Kodama
- 1960 - Ryulight
- 1961 - Chitose Harbor
- 1962 - Kotaro
- 1963 - Prima Donna
- 1964 - Eight Crown
- 1965 - Nihon Pillow Ace
- 1966 - Mejiro Taiyo
- 1967 - Marchs
- 1968 - Riki Eikan
- 1969 - Tanino Moutier
- 1970 - Long One
- 1971 - Hide Hayate
- 1972 - Kishu Laurel
- 1973 - Kitano Kachidoki
- 1974 - Raijin
- 1975 - Ten Point
- 1976 - Ryu Kiko
- 1977 - Bambton Court
- 1978 - Tamamo Asahi
- 1979 - Lafontaice
- 1980 - Sunny Ciboulette
- 1981 - Lead Eighty
- 1982 - Daizen King
- 1983 - Long Hayabusa
- 1984 - Daigo Totsugeki
- 1985 - Katsuragi Heiden
- 1986 - Gold City
- 1987 - Soccer Boy
- 1988 - Lucky Guerlain
- 1989 - Kogane Taifu
- 1990 - Ibuki Maikagura

== See also ==
- Horse racing in Japan
- List of Japanese flat horse races
