= Caerleon (horse) =

American-bred, Irish-trained Thoroughbred racehorse and sire (1980–1998)

- Sire: Nijinsky
- Grandsire: Northern Dancer
- Dam: Foreseer
- Damsire: Round Table
- Sex: Stallion
- Foaled: 1980
- Country: United States
- Colour: Bay
- Breeder: Claiborne Farm
- Owner: Robert Sangster
- Trainer: Vincent O'Brien
- Record: 8: 4-2-0

Major wins
- Anglesey Stakes (1982); Prix du Jockey Club (1983); Benson & Hedges Gold Cup (1983)

Awards
- Leading sire in Great Britain & Ireland (1988, 1991); Timeform rating: 132
- Last updated on 28 April 2022

Caerleon (27 March 1980 – 2 February 1998) was an American-bred, Irish-trained Thoroughbred racehorse who won Group One races in France and Great Britain. He was twice champion sire in Great Britain and Ireland. Bred by Seth Hancock at his famous Claiborne Farm in Kentucky, he was a son of the 1970 British Triple Crown winner Nijinsky. His dam was Foreseer, a daughter of U.S. Racing Hall of Fame inductee, Round Table.

Caerleon was purchased at the Keeneland Yearling Sale by leading British owner, Robert Sangster. As a two-year-old, he made two starts at the Curragh Racecourse in Ireland for trainer Vincent O'Brien, earning wins in his debut and the Anglesey Stakes. At age three, he won the French Derby at Chantilly Racecourse in France and the Benson & Hedges Gold Cup at York Racecourse in England. Back at the Curragh, he ran second to Shareef Dancer in the Irish Derby.

== Stud record ==
Caerleon was retired to stud duty at Coolmore Stud for the 1984 season. In North America, he was known as Caerleon II. An immediate success, he became the leading sire in Great Britain and Ireland in 1988 and again in 1991. During his career at stud, Caerleon sired 101 stakes winners including:

- Caerwent (b. 1985) - won G1 National Stakes
- Corwyn Bay (b. 1986) - Anglesey Stakes, Cartier Million, Ancient Title Stakes
- Kostroma (b. 1986) - multiple G1 winner in the U.S. who set a world record for 1 1/8 miles on grass
- Shinko Lovely (b. 1989) - won the Mile Championship (1993)
- Lady Carla (1993) - won Epsom Oaks
- Missionary Ridge (b. 1987) - won G1 Pacific Classic Stakes, career earnings US$1,864,498
- Generous (b. 1988) - won 1991 the Derby and the Irish Derby; 1991 European champion and world's highest-rated racehorse
- Only Royale (b. 1989) - won G1 Yorkshire Oaks (2x)
- Moonax (b. 1991) - won G1s St. Leger Stakes, Prix Royal-Oak, 1994 European Champion Stayer
- Overbury (b. 1991) - won the Queen Elizabeth II Cup in Hong Kong, the G2 American Derby at Arlington Park in Chicago
- Auriette (b. 1992) - won Honeymoon Handicap (1995), Santa Barbara Handicap (1996)
- Biwa Heidi (b. 1993) - won the Hanshin Sansai Stakes (1995)
- Fusaichi Concorde (b. 1993) - won the Tōkyō Yūshun (1996)
- Grape Tree Road (b. 1993) - won G1 Grand Prix de Paris
- Coretta (b. 1994) - won La Prevoyante Handicap (2x), Long Island Handicap, Orchid Handicap
- Cape Verdi (b. 1995) - won G1 1000 Guineas
- Sunspangled (1996) - won Fillies' Mile
- Marienbard (b. 1997) - Won G1s Prix de l'Arc de Triomphe, Grosser Preis von Baden, Deutschland-Preis, career earnings £1,257,152
- Warrsan (b. 1998) - won G1s Coronation Cup (2x) and Grosser Preis von Baden (2x). Career earnings of £1,654,749
- Preseli (1999) - won Moyglare Stud Stakes

Caerleon was also the damsire of:

- Mutafaweq - wins include the St. Leger Stakes and Canadian International
- Taiki Shuttle - 1998 Japanese Horse of the Year and Japan Racing Association Hall of Fame inductee
- Nashoba's Key - multiple Grade 1 winner and 2007 California Horse of the Year
- Buena Vista - Winner of multiple Grade I races, including the 2011 Japan Cup
- Red Desire - Winner of the 2011 Shūka Shō

Caerleon died at age eighteen on 2 February 1998, at Coolmore Stud in Ireland.
