= Meisho Doto =

Irish-bred Thoroughbred racehorse

Meisho Doto メイショウドトウ
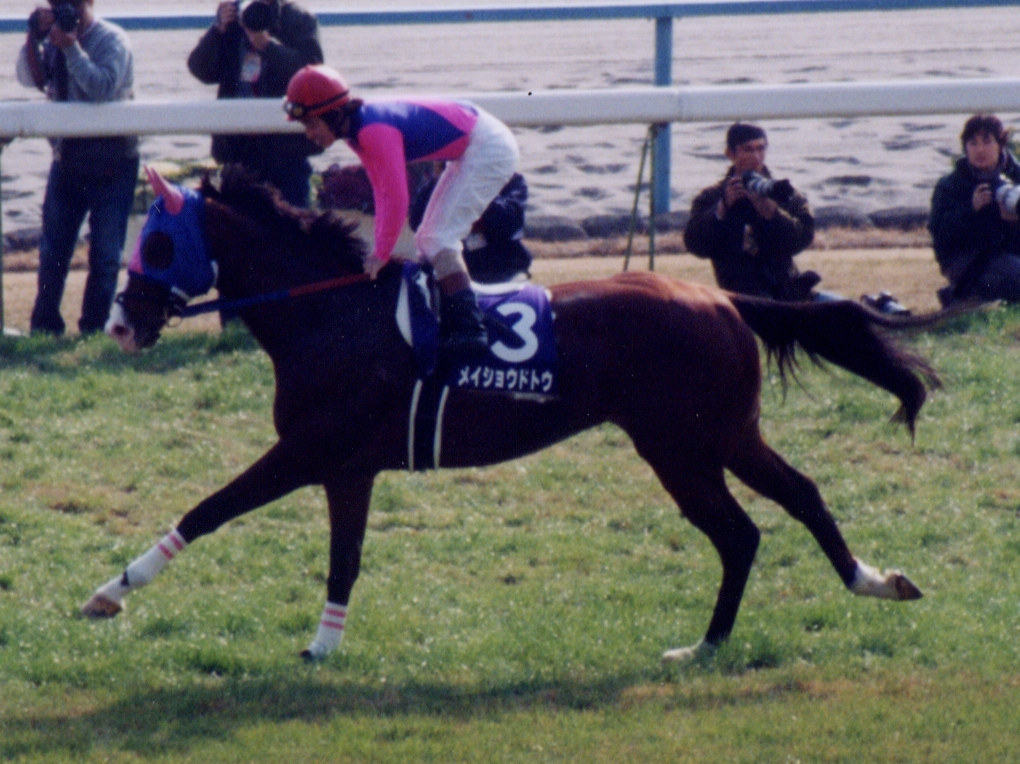
- Meisho Doto at Kyoto Racecourse, 13 January 2002
- Breed: Thoroughbred
- Sire: Bigstone
- Grandsire: Last Tycoon
- Dam: Princess Reema
- Damsire: Affirmed
- Sex: Stallion
- Foaled: March 25, 1996 (age 30)
- Country: Ireland
- Colour: Bay
- Breeder: P. Hardy
- Owner: Yoshio Matsumoto
- Racing colours
- Trainer: Isao Yasuda
- Jockey: Yasuhiko Yasuda
- Record: 27: 10-8-2
- Earnings: 921,330,000 JPY

Major wins
- Takarazuka Kinen (2001); Kinko Sho (2001); Nikkei Sho (2001); Sankei Sho All Comers (2000); Chukyo Kinen (2000)

Meisho Doto (Japanese: メイショウドトウ, Hepburn: Meishou Dotou; foaled March 25, 1996) is a retired Irish-bred, Japanese-trained Thoroughbred racehorse and sire. During his racing career, he came second in 5 Grade 1 races behind his rival T. M. Opera O, and became known as a "silver collector". In 2001, he defeated his rival at the Takarazuka Kinen and won his first and only G1 race.

== Background ==
Yoshio Matsumoto purchased the horse for 4 million yen after another owner retired from owning horses. Meisho Doto's damsire was champion American racehorse Affirmed, who was the eleventh winner of the American Triple Crown. Meisho Doto was sired by Sussex Stakes and Queen Elizabeth II Stakes winner Bigstone.

== Racing career ==
=== 1999: four-year-old season (Note: Meisho Doto's racing career uses both new and old horse age notation. Before 2000, horses in Japan were 1 year old at the time of birth. Because of this, Meisho Doto was able to run in races for four-year-olds despite technically being five years old.) ===
Meisho Doto's first race was a debut race over 1800m on dirt at Kyoto Racecourse. He was ridden by Yasuhiko Yasuda and came second behind Tai Sosa. He won his next debut race on the same track ten days after his last race.

He ran next in an allowance race for four-year-olds who had previously won a race and came fourth. In April, Meisho Doto ran in the Kaido Sho at Chukyo Racecourse, another allowance race for horses who had won only one race, and came first. His next four races, the Hong Kong Jockey Race Trophy, the Poplar Stakes, the Okurayama Tokubetsu, and the Doshin Sports Sho, resulted in defeat for Meisho Doto. However, his performance improved in the autumn with consecutive victories in the Sagano Tokubetsu and the Doncaster Stakes. Meisho Doto's potential was limited due to being unable to race in the Classic Triple Crown (the Satsuki Sho, the Japanese Derby, and the Kikuka Sho) because he was not foaled in Japan. He was also unable to race in the NHK Mile Cup, a race established for the purpose of giving foreign horses in Japan a G1 race to aim for before restrictions on foreign horses were lifted, because of his delayed debut; a racehorse must be three years of age to run in the NHK Mile Cup.

=== 2000: five-year-old season ===
Meisho Doto's first race in his five-year-old season was the G2 Nikkei Shinshun Hai. This was Meisho Doto's first graded race, and he came second behind Marvelous Timer by half a length. In his second graded race, the Chukyo Kinen, he defeated Brilliant Road by three lengths and won the race in record time. After finishing third in the Nikkei Sho and first in the Metropolitan Stakes, he won his next major race with the Kinko Sho.

His next race would be the Takarazuka Kinen, where he was the sixth favorite out of eleven horses. The first favourite was previous Satsuki Sho winner T. M. Opera O, followed by the second favourite Grass Wonder who had won the previous year's Takarazuka Kinen. Meisho Doto ran aggressively in this race and stayed at second throughout, however he was overtaken by T. M. Opera O and came second by a neck. That year's Takarazuka Kinen was framed as "TM Opera O vs. Grass Wonder's summit decisive battle", however Meisho Doto, who could not run in the Classic Triple Crown (compared to T. M. Opera O who had run in all Classic Triple Crown races and placed in the top 3 each time), gained significant recognition due to his performance. Grass Wonder ended up finishing in sixth place, and would retire due to a fracture being discovered after the race.

Meisho Doto's racing improved as the horse matured. In the autumn, he was favoured as the first favourite in the Sankei Sho All Comers and won by one and three quarter lengths, making it his third graded race win. On 29 November, he would run in the Tenno Sho (autumn).

On the day of the Tenno Sho, Meisho Doto's previous performances in the All Comers and the Takarazuka Kinen were evaluated, and he became the second favourite behind T. M. Opera O. However, he came second to T. M. Opera O for a second time, being beaten by 2 and a half lengths.

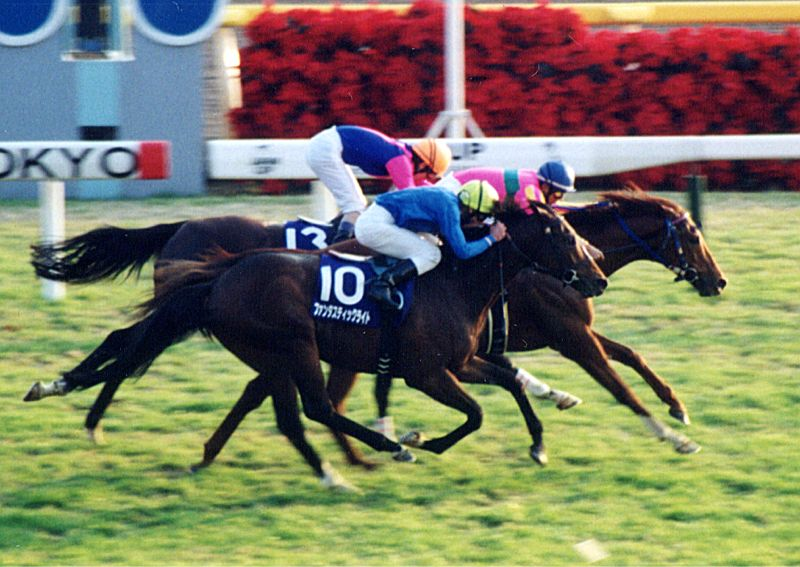
T. M. Opera O (blue helmet), Fantastic Light (yellow helmet) and Meisho Doto (orange helmet) in the Japan Cup

In his subsequent race, the Japan Cup, his popularity was overshadowed by successful overseas horses such as Fantastic Light being ridden by Frankie Dettori, Air Shakur, a two-time classic winner, and Japanese Derby winner Agnes Flight. This resulted in him starting as the fifth favourite with odds of 16/1. The race began with Stay Gold taking the lead from the start, with Meisho Doto staying with the leading group. In the final straight, T. M. Opera O made his move slightly ahead of the now leading Meisho Doto, and the three horses, including Fantastic Light, battled for first place, with Meisho Doto finishing second, just a neck behind T. M. Opera O. T. M. Opera O had now narrowly defeated Meisho Doto three times.

Before the Arima Kinen, after facing defeat to T. M. Opera O and finishing second in three consecutive G1 races, Meisho Doto's main jockey Yasuda stated, "There is no difference in the horse's abilities. I will ride to win," showing a desire for revenge. On the day of the race, the odds heavily favoured T. M. Opera O, making him the first favourite at odds of 1.7, while Meisho Doto was the second favourite at 6.8 times the stake, and Narita Top Road, the Kikka-sho champion of the same generation, followed as the third favourite at 7.6 times the stake. In the race, Meisho Doto came around the fourth corner from the outside and entered the straight, chasing down Daiwa Texas, who had taken the lead from the middle of the field. Conversely, T. M. Opera O found no clear path at the fourth corner and entered the straight behind Meisho Doto, but managed to squeeze through a narrow gap between Meisho Doto and Toho Shiden on the inside, getting ahead of Meisho Doto. Meisho Doto then followed T. M. Opera O and caught up to Daiwa Texas, leading to a final showdown between the two, but finished second, just a nose behind T. M. Opera O. As a result, Meisho Doto ended up placing second to T. M. Opera O in all three autumn classic races.

=== 2001: six-year-old season ===
Those associated with Meisho Doto expressed a strong desire to "defeat T. M. Opera O" after he had taken away the horse's chance for an Autumn Triple Crown victory. In the Nikkei Sho on January 16, the first race of 2001, Meisho Doto showed overwhelming popularity with odds of 1.1. He triumphed in this race, defeating Matikane Kinnohosi in a struggle for first on the final straight, marking his fourth major graded victory.

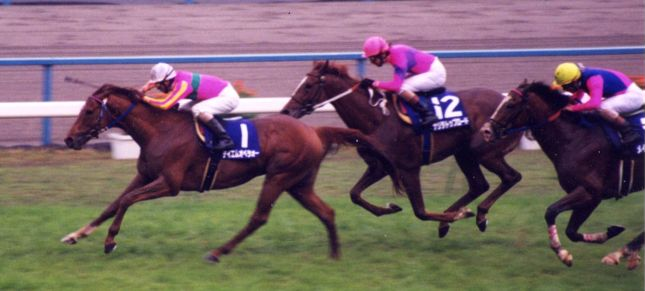
Left to right: T. M. Opera O (first), Narita Top Road (third) and Meisho Doto (second) at the Tenno Sho

On the day of the Tenno Sho (Spring), Meisho Doto was the third favourite behind Narita Top Road and T. M. Opera O with odds of 6.5. Even with Meisho Doto being sired by champion miler Bigstone, the 3200m distance of the Tenno Sho was believed to be unsuitable for him, as he had never ran such a distance before. However, Meisho Doto's camp was hopeful as T. M. Opera O's winning streak had been broken at the Osaka Hai, with the horse finishing fourth. Narita Top Road's landslide victory at the Hanshin Daishoten had pushed him into second favourite.

In the race, after experiencing four consecutive losses at the hands of T. M. Opera O, Meisho Doto conserved energy behind the horse. Meisho Doto overtook the leading Narita Top Road with 100m remaining, and finished second behind T. M. Opera O who had broken off from the pack. Meisho Doto had now came second to T. M. Opera O five times in a row. However, jockey Yasuhiko Yasuda stated after the race, "This was the first time at this distance, and I was half in doubt about whether stamina would hold out. The horse performed well. There was definitely something gained today. With this, I can turn the tables next time."

At the Takarazuka Kinen on June 24, the Meisho Doto camp stated that "I thought this was the only place to be," with the Takarazuka Kinen being the sixth race between Meisho Doto and T. M. Opera O. T. M. Opera O was the first favourite with odds of 1.5, while Meisho Doto was the second favourite with odds of 3.4. The odds for the two horses being in the perfecta was 2.1. Jockey Yasuda, who showed confidence in getting revenge against T. M. Opera O after the Tenno Sho (Spring), thought that challenging T. M. Opera O in an acceleration battle would not be favourable based on their past matchups, and he revealed before the race that he would take a forward strategy. In the race, as declared beforehand, he took an aggressive approach, moving first at the third corner, and took the lead before turning the final corner, passing the leading Hot Secret on the inside. On the other hand, T. M. Opera O struggled under the pressure of other horses at the fourth corner and could not find a path through. Although he made a strong push from the outside in the final straight, Meisho Doto shook off the pursuit and won by a margin of one and a quarter lengths. This marked the first victory in a G1 race for Meisho Doto.

After the race, Yasuda expressed his joy, stating, "I was so happy that I could have quit being a jockey," and when he emerged from the weighing room, applause erupted from the connections and reporters. Additionally, Yasuda Isao, who trained Meisho Doto, remarked, "I was frustrated about losing by a narrow margin. He was in good condition, and I thought this was his best chance in terms of distance," savouring the victory. With this victory, Meisho Doto became a racehorse that brought a G1 win to the owner, Yoshio Matsumoto, for the first time in 28 years. Furthermore, it marked the first G1 title for trainer Yasuda and became his only G1 title in his lifetime.

After winning the Takarazuka Kinen, he entered the autumn's first race, the Tenno Sho (Autumn), as a G1 horse, being the second favourite with odds of 3.4. When the race started, the horse expected to lead, Silent Hunter, had a poor start, allowing Meisho Doto to take the lead, followed by the favourite T. M. Opera O and the third favourite Stay Gold forming the leading pack. Although Meisho Doto entered the final straight in the lead, he lacked stretch and was passed by T. M Opera O who surged from the centre. However, Agnes Digital, who came from the widest outside, overtook both Meisho Doto and T. M. Opera O, with Meisho Doto finishing in third place.

In the following Japan Cup, the favourite was T. M. Opera O and the second favourite was Jungle Pocket, the Derby winner of that year, while Meisho Doto was running as the third favourite. Stay Gold was the fourth favourite, followed by Narita Top Road in fifth. The race unfolded with the top horses conserving their energy, and Meisho Doto made a strong push from the inside in the final straight, closing in on the leader. With 400 meters remaining, T. M. Opera O took the lead, but Meisho Doto could not fully extend, and Jungle Pocket made a surge from the outside, clinching the victory and becoming the first Derby horse to also win the Japan Cup in the same year. Meisho Doto finished in fifth place, 0.8 seconds behind the top two.

In the Arima Kinen held on December 23, which was considered the retirement race for Meisho Doto, he was the second favourite with odds of 5.5, against the first favourite, T.M. Opera O, who had odds of 1.8. Following them was Manhattan Cafe, who had just won the Kikuka Sho that year and was the third favourite with odds of 7.1. This race was both Meisho Doto's retirement race and T.M. Opera O's retirement race. The race was led by To the Victory, with Meisho Doto running on the outside of the front pack, while T.M. Opera O and Manhattan Cafe stayed behind them. Similar to the Takarazuka Kinen, where Meisho Doto successfully maintained a leading strategy, he began to accelerate early from the turn between the third and fourth corners, entering the final straight in the middle of the track. However, he did not fully extend in the straight and was overtaken by Manhattan Cafe, who showed a strong finish from the outside. Although he was nearly passed by T.M. Opera O, who had been chasing behind, Meisho Doto managed to hold his position at the front before the finish line, securing fourth place.

Shortly after the start of 2002, a joint retirement ceremony was held for T.M. Opera O and Meisho Doto.

== Retirement ==
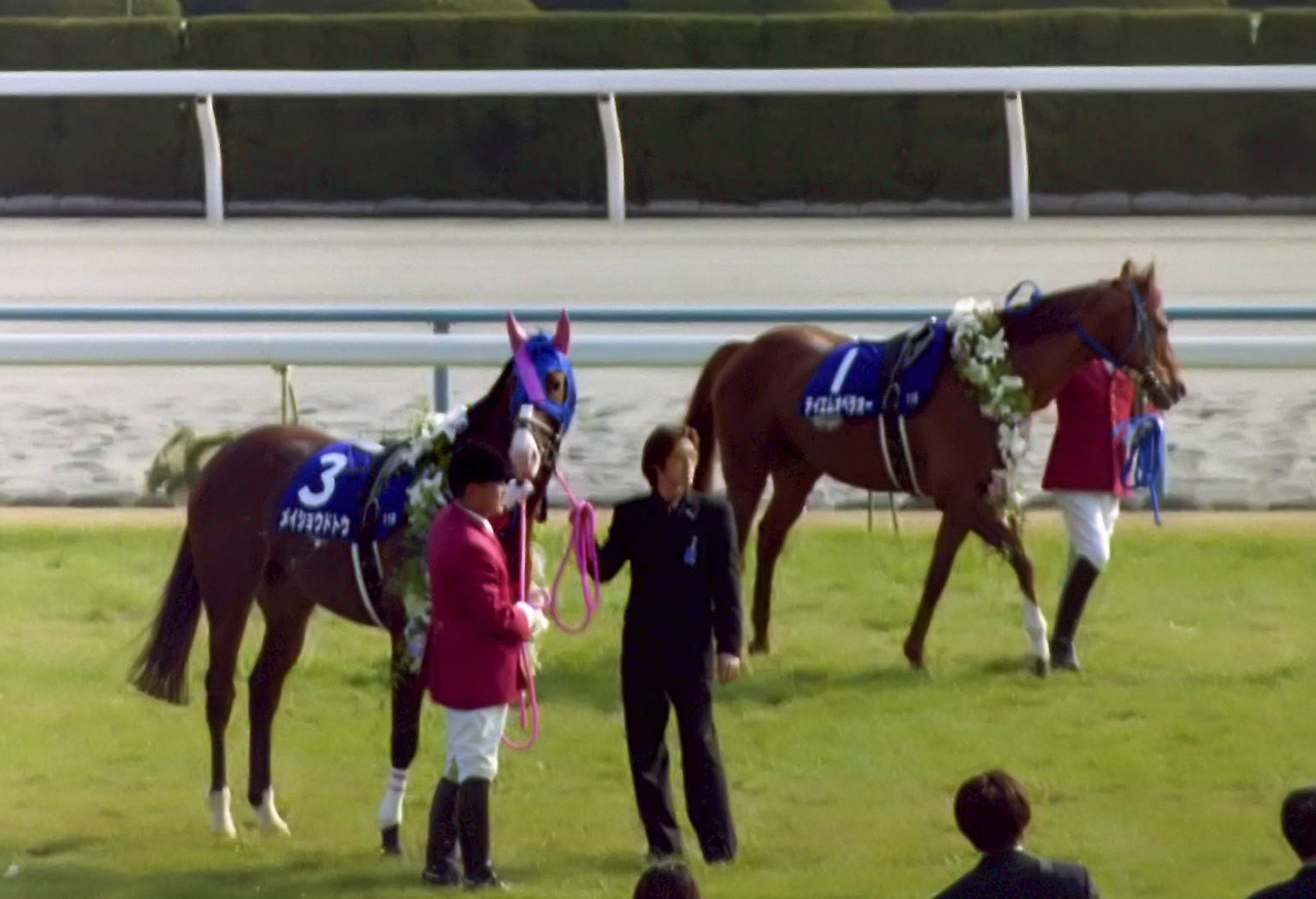
Meisho Doto (left) and T. M. Opera O (right) at their joint retirement ceremony

After retirement, he became a breeding stallion at East Stud alongside T.M. Opera O, and during 10 years of service, there were 270 registered offspring, with 241 of them having raced. Subsequently, as he aged and the number of breedings decreased, owner Yoshio Matsumoto planned to take care of him for life. However, the certified NPO organization Retirement Horse Association requested him to be transferred to Matsumoto as the "face" of the association, which Matsumoto accepted. Therefore, starting in 2017, he has been spending his remaining years as a foster horse of the Retirement Horse Association. In 2018, he became a candidate for the Grant Program for Retired Famous Horses and moved from East Stud to Versailles Farm on November 29. Since then, he has taken on a role in the awareness-raising activities of the Retirement Horse Association along with Nice Nature, who holds a position similar to that of a public relations director, and Taiki Shuttle, who became a foster horse around the same time. On June 16, 2021, he was relocated to Northern Lake in Shinkan Town, Hokkaido, along with Taiki Shuttle. He and Taiki Shuttle would become close and were often seen together until the latter's passing in 2022. Meisho Doto has since inherited Taiki Shuttle's blanket and can be seen wearing it on cold days.

At Northern Lake, interactions with Meto, a former stray cat now kept as the farm's mascot, have become a hot topic, particularly a video of Meto riding on the back of Meisho Doto for the first time, which has surpassed one million views on YouTube. In December 2023, a photo book documenting the interactions between the two, titled 'Boss Cat Meto and Meisho Doto: The Miracle of the Retired Racehorse Farm Northern Lake' (Tatsumi Publishing, ISBN 978-4777830749), was released.

== In popular culture ==
An anthropormorphized version of Meisho Doto appears as a character in the Japanese multimedia franchise Umamusume: Pretty Derby, voiced by Misaki Watada. She is depicted as a painfully shy and clumsy girl from a wealthy family with low self-confidence, yet nevertheless tries to change for the better with help from her close friend, role model, and rival T. M. Opera O. She has made appearances as a side character in the ONA and later film Umamusume Pretty Derby: Road to the Top, as well as in the film Umamusume: Pretty Derby – Beginning of a New Era. The popularity of both the series and the character has been credited with playing a critical role in raising funds for Northern Lake Farm to restore their horse stables, which had fallen into a state of dilapidation by late 2025. The fundraiser concluded at over ¥126,000,000, well exceeding the target of ¥15,000,000.

== Racing record ==
Date	Age	Track	Race	Grade	Distance (condition)	Field	Finish	Time	Jockey	1st Place (2nd Place)
6 Jan 1999	3	Kyoto	Four Year Old Newcomers		1800m (Fast)	8	2	1.56.6	Yasuhiko Yasuda	Tai Sosa
16 Jan 1999	3	Kyoto	Four Year Old Newcomers		1800m (Fast)	9	1	1.55.7	Yasuhiko Yasuda	(Miracle Gift)
20 Mar 1999	3	Hanshin	Four Year Old Allowance		1800m (Muddy)	15	4	1.52.7	Yasuhiko Yasuda	Tai Robbery
18 Apr 1999	3	Chukyo	Kaido Sho		1700m (Good)	16	1	1.46.9	Yasuhiko Yasuda	(Dynamic Win)
23 May 1999	3	Chukyo	Hong Kong Jockey Club Trophy	OP	1700m (Fast)	16	8	1.46.9	Yasuhiko Yasuda	My Season
5 Sep 1999	3	Sapporo	Poplar Stakes		1500m (Firm)	11	8	1.30.7	Yasuhiko Yasuda	Princess Carla
18 Sep 1999	3	Sapporo	Okurayama Tokubetsu		1800m (Firm)	10	4	1.51.4	Yasuhiko Yasuda	Cheers Beauty
25 Sep 1999	3	Sapporo	Doshin Sports Sho		2000m (Soft)	14	2	2.05.7	Yasuhiko Yasuda	Erimo Pure
16 Oct 1999	3	Kyoto	Sagano Tokubetsu		2000m (Firm)	13	1	2.02.2	Yasuhiko Yasuda	(Violet Pearl)
14 Nov 1999	3	Kyoto	Doncaster Stakes		1800m (Firm)	11	1	1.46.9	Yasuhiko Yasuda	(Lord Successor)
26 Dec 1999	3	Hanshin	Rokko Stakes	OP	2000m (Firm)	11	11	2.04.3	Yasuhiko Yasuda	Tunante
16 Jan 2000	4	Kyoto	Nikkei Shinshun Hai	G2	2400m (Firm)	14	2	2.24.4	Koshiro Take	Marvelous Timer
5 Mar 2000	4	Chukyo	Chukyo Kinen	G3	2000m (Firm)	14	1	R1.59.1	Yasuhiko Yasuda	(Brilliant Road)
26 Mar 2000	4	Nakayama	Nikkei Sho	G2	2500m (Firm)	10	3	2.35.8	Yasuhiko Yasuda	Leo Ryuho
29 Apr 2000	4	Tokyo	Metropolitan Stakes	OP	2300m (Firm)	9	1	2.18.5	Yasuhiko Yasuda	(Craftsmanship)
27 May 2000	4	Chukyo	Kinko Sho	G2	2000m (Good)	11	1	1.58.5	Yasuhiko Yasuda	(Jo Big Bang)
25 Jun 2000	4	Hanshin	Takarazuka Kinen	G1	2200m (Good)	11	2	2.13.8	Hiroshi Kawachi	T. M. Opera O
24 Sep 2000	4	Nakayama	Sankei Sho All Comers	G2	2200m (Soft)	9	1	2.15.8	Hitoshi Matoba	(Sakura Namiki O)
29 Oct 2000	4	Tokyo	Tennō Shō (Autumn)	G1	2000m (Soft)	16	2	2.00.3	Hitoshi Matoba	T. M. Opera O
26 Nov 2000	4	Tokyo	Japan Cup	G1	2400m (Good)	16	2	2.26.1	Yasuhiko Yasuda	T. M. Opera O
24 Dec 2000	4	Nakayama	Arima Kinen	G1	2500m (Good)	16	2	2.34.1	Yasuhiko Yasuda	T. M. Opera O
24 Mar 2001	5	Nakayama	Nikkei Sho	G2	2500m (Good)	10	1	2.33.7	Yasuhiko Yasuda	(Matikanekinnohoshi)
29 Apr 2001	5	Kyoto	Tennō Shō (Spring)	G1	3200m (Good)	12	2	3.16.3	Yasuhiko Yasuda	T. M. Opera O
24 Jun 2001	5	Hanshin	Takarazuka Kinen	G1	2200m (Good)	12	1	2.11.7	Yasuhiko Yasuda	(T. M. Opera O)
28 Oct 2001	5	Tokyo	Tennō Shō (Autumn)	G1	2400m (Good)	13	3	2.02.6	Yasuhiko Yasuda	Agnes Digital
25 Nov 2001	5	Tokyo	Japan Cup	G1	2400m (Good)	15	5	2.24.6	Yasuhiko Yasuda	Jungle Pocket
23 Dec 2001	5	Nakayama	Arima Kinen	G1	2500m (Good)	13	4	2.33.3	Yasuhiko Yasuda	Manhattan Cafe

== Pedigree ==
Pedigree of Meisho Doto (IRE), bay stallion, 1996
Sire Bigstone (IRE) 1990	Last Tycoon (IRE); 1983	Try My Best	Northern Dancer
Sire Bigstone (IRE) 1990	Last Tycoon (IRE); 1983	Try My Best	Sex Appeal
Sire Bigstone (IRE) 1990	Last Tycoon (IRE); 1983	Mill Princess	Mill Reef
Sire Bigstone (IRE) 1990	Last Tycoon (IRE); 1983	Mill Princess	Irish Lass
Sire Bigstone (IRE) 1990	Batave (IRE); 1982	Posse	Forli
Sire Bigstone (IRE) 1990	Batave (IRE); 1982	Posse	In Hot Pursuit
Sire Bigstone (IRE) 1990	Batave (IRE); 1982	Bon Appetit	Major Portion
Sire Bigstone (IRE) 1990	Batave (IRE); 1982	Bon Appetit	Sweet Solera
Dam Princess Reema (USA) 1984	Affirmed (USA); 1975	Exclusive Native	Raise a Native
Dam Princess Reema (USA) 1984	Affirmed (USA); 1975	Exclusive Native	Exclusive
Dam Princess Reema (USA) 1984	Affirmed (USA); 1975	Won't Tell You	Crafty Admiral
Dam Princess Reema (USA) 1984	Affirmed (USA); 1975	Won't Tell You	Scarlet Ribbon
Dam Princess Reema (USA) 1984	First Fling (USA); 1977	Nijinsky	Northern Dancer
Dam Princess Reema (USA) 1984	First Fling (USA); 1977	Nijinsky	Flaming Page
Dam Princess Reema (USA) 1984	First Fling (USA); 1977	Fast Approach	First Landing
Dam Princess Reema (USA) 1984	First Fling (USA); 1977	Fast Approach	Pinny Gray
