= Aventura (horse) =

Japanese Thoroughbred racehorse

Aventura; アヴェンチュラ
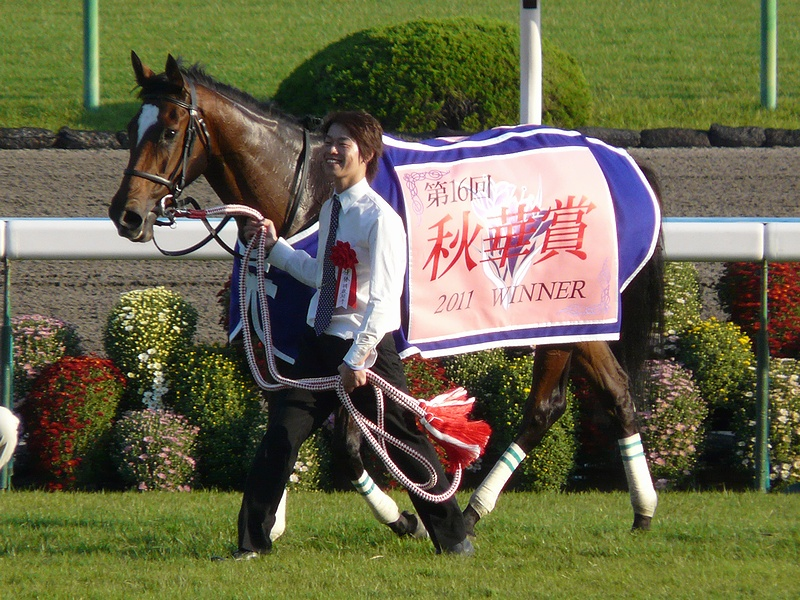
- Aventura after winning the Shuka Sho
- Sire: Jungle Pocket
- Grandsire: Tony Bin
- Dam: Admire Sunday
- Damsire: Sunday Silence
- Sex: Mare
- Foaled: 7 March 2008
- Country: Japan
- Colour: Bay
- Breeder: Northern Farm
- Owner: U Carrot Farm
- Racing colours
- Trainer: Katsuhiko Sumii
- Jockey: Yasunari Iwata; Kenichi Ikezoe
- Record: 7: 4-2-0
- Earnings: 216,348,000 JPY

Major wins
- Queen Stakes (2011); Japanese Classic Tiara Race wins: Shuka Sho (2011)

Awards
- JRA Award for Best Three-Year-Old Filly (2011)

Aventura (Japanese: アヴェンチュラ, foaled 7 March 2008) is a Japanese Thoroughbred racehorse and broodmare. As a juvenile in 2010 she showed very promising form, winning on her debut before running second in the Sapporo Nisai Stakes and fourth in the Hanshin Juvenile Fillies. She missed the first half of the next season but then won the Isaribi Stakes and the Queen Stakes before recording her biggest victory in the Shuka Sho. She sustained her only defeat of the year on her final start when she was beaten a neck by Snow Fairy in the Queen Elizabeth II Commemorative Cup. Her achievements saw her being awarded the 2011 JRA Award for Best Three-Year-Old Filly.

== Background ==
Aventura is a bay mare with a large white star bred in Hokkaido by Northern Farm. During her racing career she carried the green, white and red colours of U Carrot Farm and was trained by Katsuhiko Sumii.

She was from the 6th crop of foals sired by Jungle Pocket who won the Tokyo Yushun and the Japan Cup in 2001. He went on to become a successful breeding stallion whose other foals included Jaguar Mail (Tenno Sho), and Jungle Rocket (New Zealand Oaks).

Aventura's dam Admire Sunday showed high class form, winning three race and finishing second in the Hanshin Himba Stakes. As a broodmare she also produced Aventura's full sister Tall Poppy who won the Yushun Himba in 2008. She was a granddaughter of the undefeated French mare Madelia.

== Racing career ==
=== 2010: two-year-old season ===
Aventura began her racing career in a contest for previously unraced juveniles over 1600 metres at Hanshin Racecourse on 20 June and won from Eishin Osman, a colt who went on to win the New Zealand Trophy. After a three-month break she was moved up in class for the Grade 3 Sapporo Nisai Stakes and finished second, three quarters of a length behind the colt All As One. On 12 December at Hanshin, Aventura was one of eighteen contenders for the Grade 1 Hanshin Juvenile Fillies over 1600 metres and started the 8.9/1 third choice in the betting. Ridden by Ryuji Wada she was restrained towards the rear before making steady progress in the straight and finished fourth behind Reve d'Essor, Whale Capture and Rice Terrace, beaten two and a half lengths behind the winner.

In the official Japanese rankings for 2010, Aventura was rated the fourth-best juvenile filly, five pounds behind the top-rated Reve d'Essor.

=== 2011: Three-year-old season ===
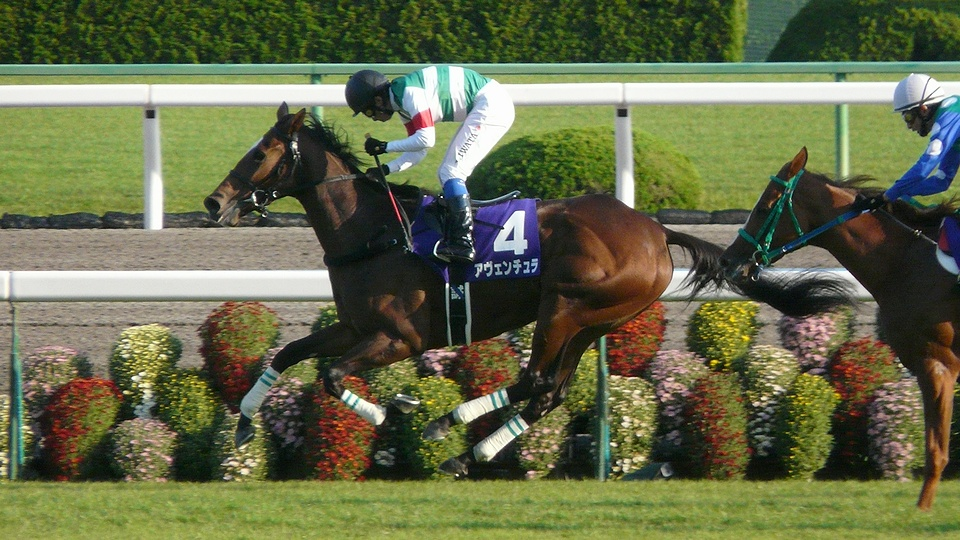
Aventura wins the Shuka Sho

Aventura missed the first half of the 2011 season after sustaining a leg fracture. She made her first appearance of the year on 30 July at Hakodate Racecourse when she won the Isaribi Stakes from the four-year-old Silk Earnest and ten others. Kenichi Ikezoe took the ride two weeks later when the filly was made the 1.7/1 favourite for the Grade 3 Queen Stakes at Sapporo. After racing in fourth or fifth place for most of the way she took the lead in the straight and won by a neck from Cosmo Nemo Shin.

On 16 October, with Yasunari Iwata in the saddle, Aventura started second favourite behind Whale Capture (who had won the Rose Stakes on her last start) in the Grade 1 Shuka Sho over 2000 metres at Kyoto Racecourse. The other sixteen runners included Marcellina (Oka Sho), Meine Isabel (Niigata Nisai Stakes), Erin Court (Yushun Himba) and Calmato (Shion Stakes). After racing in third place behind the front-running outsider Memorial Year, Aventura took the lead in the straight and won by one and a quarter lengths from Kyowa Jeanne with Whale Capture the same distance back in third. Iwata commented:

"It is the first time I have ridden her but I didn't feel any concerns".

Aventura made her final run of the year in the Queen Elizabeth II Commemorative Cup over 2200 metres at Kyoto on 13 November when she started second favourite behind the British-trained four-year-old Snow Fairy who had won the race in 2010. After racing in mid-division she finished strongly to take second place, a neck behind Snow Fairy, with Apapane, Whale Capture, Reve d'Essor, Erin Court, Dancing Rain and Saint Emilion finishing behind. Aventura suffered a fracture of both third carpal bones during this race. This injury needed a long period of time to recover. So, the team decided to retire her and assigned her to broodmare duty at the Northern Farm.

In the Japanese rankings for 2011, Aventura was rated best three-year-old filly, four pounds ahead of Whale Capture and Reve d'Essor. In January 2012 Aventura topped the poll for the JRA Award for Best Three-Year-Old Filly, taking 268 of the 285 votes.

== Racing form ==
Aventura won four races out of seven starts. This data is available in JBIS and netkeiba.

Date	Track	Race	Grade	Distance (Condition)	Entry	HN	Odds (Favored)	Finish	Time	Margins	Jockey	Winner (Runner-up)
2010 – two-year-old season
Jun 20	Hanshin	2yo Newcomer		1,600 m (Firm)	12	2	3.7 (2)	1st	1:35.7	–0.6	Yuichi Fukunaga	(Eishin Osman)
Oct 2	Sapporo	Sapporo Nisai Stakes	3	1,800 m (Firm)	14	11	4.5 (2)	2nd	1:49.9	0.1	Kenichi Ikezoe	All as One
Dec 12	Hanshin	Hanshin Juvenile Fillies	1	1,600 m (Firm)	18	1	9.9 (3)	4th	1:36.1	0.4	Ryuji Wada	Reve d'Essor
2011 – three-year-old season
Jul 30	Hakodate	Isaribi Stakes	ALW (3W)	1,800 m (Firm)	12	4	3.3 (2)	1st	1:47.9	–0.4	Kenichi Ikezoe	(Silk Earnest)
Aug 14	Sapporo	Queen Stakes	3	1,800 m (Firm)	14	9	2.7 (1)	1st	1:46.6	0.0	Kenichi Ikezoe	(Cosmo Nemo Shin)
Oct 16	Kyoto	Shuka Sho	1	2,000 m (Good)	18	14	3.1 (2)	1st	1:58.2	–0.2	Yasunari Iwata	(Kyowa Jeanne)
Nov 13	Kyoto	QE II Cup	1	2,200 m (Firm)	18	1	4.8 (2)	2nd	2:11.6	0.0	Yasunari Iwata	Snow Fairy

== Breeding record ==
Aventura was retired from racing to become a broodmare. As of 2026, she has produced ten foals:

- Desafiante, a bay filly, foaled in 2015, sired by King Kamehameha
- unnamed bay colt, 2016, by Harbinger
- Kaiser Line, bay colt, 2017, by Epiphaneia
- Safar, bay gelding, 2018, by King Kamehameha
- Travolgente, dark bay colt, 2020, by Lord Kanaloa
- Accession, chestnut colt, 2021, by Rey de Oro
- Navigatore, bay colt, 2022, by Lord Kanaloa
- Spill It, chestnut colt, 2023, by Bricks and Mortar
- unnamed bay filly, 2025, by Saturnalia
- unnamed bay filly, 2026, by Schnell Meister

== Pedigree ==
Pedigree of Aventura (JPN), bay mare 2008
Sire Jungle Pocket (JPN) 1998	Tony Bin (IRE); 1983	Kampala (GB)	Kalamoun
Sire Jungle Pocket (JPN) 1998	Tony Bin (IRE); 1983	Kampala (GB)	State Pension
Sire Jungle Pocket (JPN) 1998	Tony Bin (IRE); 1983	Severn Bridge (GB)	Hornbeam
Sire Jungle Pocket (JPN) 1998	Tony Bin (IRE); 1983	Severn Bridge (GB)	Priddy Fair
Sire Jungle Pocket (JPN) 1998	Dance Charmer (USA); 1990	Nureyev	Northern Dancer (CAN)
Sire Jungle Pocket (JPN) 1998	Dance Charmer (USA); 1990	Nureyev	Special
Sire Jungle Pocket (JPN) 1998	Dance Charmer (USA); 1990	Skilful Joy	Nodouble
Sire Jungle Pocket (JPN) 1998	Dance Charmer (USA); 1990	Skilful Joy	Skilful Miss
Dam Admire Sunday (JPN) 1995	Sunday Silence (USA); 1986	Halo	Hail To Reason
Dam Admire Sunday (JPN) 1995	Sunday Silence (USA); 1986	Halo	Cosmah
Dam Admire Sunday (JPN) 1995	Sunday Silence (USA); 1986	Wishing Well	Understanding
Dam Admire Sunday (JPN) 1995	Sunday Silence (USA); 1986	Wishing Well	Mountain Flower
Dam Admire Sunday (JPN) 1995	Moon Indigo (USA); 1986	El Gran Senor	Northern Dancer (CAN)
Dam Admire Sunday (JPN) 1995	Moon Indigo (USA); 1986	El Gran Senor	Sex Appeal
Dam Admire Sunday (JPN) 1995	Moon Indigo (USA); 1986	Madelia (FR)	Caro (IRE)
Dam Admire Sunday (JPN) 1995	Moon Indigo (USA); 1986	Madelia (FR)	Moonmadness (USA) (Family 1-p)

- Aventura was inbred 4 × 4 to Northern Dancer, meaning that this stallion appears twice in the fourth generation of her pedigree.
