= Bigstone =

Irish-bred Thoroughbred racehorse

- Sire: Last Tycoon
- Grandsire: Try My Best
- Dam: Batave
- Damsire: Posse
- Sex: Stallion
- Foaled: 8 February 1990
- Country: Ireland
- Colour: Bay
- Breeder: Dayton Ltd
- Owner: Daniel Wildenstein
- Trainer: Élie Lellouche
- Record: 14:5-3-2
- Earnings: £578,226

Major wins
- Prix Omnium (1993); Sussex Stakes (1993); Queen Elizabeth II Stakes (1993); Prix d'Ispahan (1994); Prix de la Forêt (1994)

Bigstone (8 February 1990) was an Irish-bred, French-trained Thoroughbred racehorse and sire. As a three-year-old he became the only French-trained horse to win both of Britain's most important all-aged mile races, the Sussex Stakes and the Queen Elizabeth II Stakes. Unraced as a two-year-old, Bigstone raced fourteen times, winning five times in a racing career which lasted from March 1993 until November 1994. After his successes in England in 1993 he added two more Group One races in France as a four-year-old, winning the Prix d'Ispahan and the Prix de la Forêt. He was then retired to stud where he had mixed success as a sire of winners.

== Background ==
Bigstone was a bay horse with a white star bred in Ireland by Dayton Ltd, a breeding operation owned by Daniel Wildenstein. He was sired by Last Tycoon, an Irish-bred, French-trained horse who won the King's Stand Stakes, Nunthorpe Stakes and Breeders' Cup Mile in 1986. At stud, he also sired Ezzoud, Marju and Lady Of Chad (Prix Marcel Boussac). His dam Batave, was a good sprinter who finished second to Last Tycoon in the Prix de Saint-Georges, and was a granddaughter of the 1000 Guineas and Oaks Stakes winner Sweet Solera.

== Racing career ==
=== 1993: three-year-old season ===
Bigstone, who had raced twice at two, finishing second on each occasion, made a winning reappearance at three in the Listed Prix Omnium over 1600 metres at Saint-Cloud on 30 March. A month later he was moved up in class and distance for the Group Two Prix Greffulhe over 2100 metres at Longchamp Racecourse. Ridden by Dominique Boeuf, he finished second to the André Fabre-trained Hunting Hawk. He was then moved up to Group One class and sustained two narrow defeats: he was beaten a neck by Le Balafre when favourite for the Prix Jean Prat and finished second by a nose by Fort Wood in the Grand Prix de Paris.

On 28 July, Bigstone was sent to England to contest the Sussex Stakes over one mile at Goodwood Racecourse and started a 14/1 outsider in a field which included Culture Vulture, Sayyedati and the favourite Zafonic. Boeuf settled the colt in the middle of the field before taking the lead a furlong from the finish and winning by one and a half lengths from Sayyedati. Boeuf's celebrations after his first win in Britain were described as being "so frenzied he almost fell from the saddle". Lellouche admitted that he had not been confident of beating Zafonic but said that "we will not be afraid in future". In September at Deauville Racecourse, Bigstone started favourite for the Prix Jacques Le Marois but was beaten in a three-way photo-finish by Kingmambo and Ski Paradise, with the British-trained colt Barathea in fourth place.

Bigstone returned to England for the Queen Elizabeth II Stakes at Ascot Racecourse on 25 September when his opponents included Kingmambo, Barathea and Sayyedati. Ridden for the first time by the Irish jockey Pat Eddery, he started at odds of 100/30 on "good to soft" ground. Eddery restrained the colt towards the rear of the nine runner field before making headway in the straight. He took the lead a furlong from the finish and won by one and a half lengths from Barathea with Kingmambo two and a half lengths back in third. On his final appearance of the season, Bigstone was sent to the United States to contest the Breeders' Cup Mile on firm ground at Santa Anita Park. Ridden again by Eddery he finished sixth of the thirteen runners behind Lure.

=== 1994: four-year-old season ===
Bigstone began his four-year-old season in the Group One Prix d'Ispahan over 1850 metres at Longchamp in May. Ridden by Olivier Peslier, he won by a neck from the British-trained five-year-old Muhtarram with the favourite Hatoof in fourth place. He then sustained three consecutive defeats, finishing eighth behind Distant View in the Sussex Stakes, fourth behind Ski Paradise in the Prix du Moulin and third to the 66/1 outsider Maroof in the Queen Elizabeth II Stakes.

In October, Bigstone moved down in distance for the 1400 metre Prix de la Forêt at Longchamp. Ridden by Peslier, he raced in fourth place before taking the lead inside the last 200 metres and won by a short neck from the British-trained four-year-old Missed Flight despite swerving to the right in the final strides. The unplaced horses included Ski Paradise, Las Meninas, Lemon Souffle and the Haydock Sprint Cup winner Lavinia Fontana. Bigstone ended his career with a second attempt at the Breeders' Cup Mile, but again failed to show his best form, finishing eighth of the fourteen runners behind Barathea.

== Stud record ==
Bigstone stood as a breeding stallion at the Coolmore Stud in Ireland before being sold to Y P Chen and exported to China in 2001. The most successful of his offspring was Meisho Doto, an Irish-bred, Japanese-trained horse who won the Takarazuka Kinen and finished second in the Arima Kinen, Japan Cup and Tennō Shō. Bigstone also sired Meteor Storm, an American-trained horse who won the Manhattan Handicap, W. L. McKnight Handicap and San Luis Rey Handicap.

== Pedigree ==
Pedigree of Bigstone (IRE), bay stallion, 1990
Sire Last Tycoon (IRE) 1983	Try My Best (USA); 1975	Northern Dancer	Nearctic
Sire Last Tycoon (IRE) 1983	Try My Best (USA); 1975	Northern Dancer	Natalma
Sire Last Tycoon (IRE) 1983	Try My Best (USA); 1975	Sex Appeal	Buckpasser
Sire Last Tycoon (IRE) 1983	Try My Best (USA); 1975	Sex Appeal	Best In Show
Sire Last Tycoon (IRE) 1983	Mill Princess (IRE); 1977	Mill Reef	Never Bend
Sire Last Tycoon (IRE) 1983	Mill Princess (IRE); 1977	Mill Reef	Milan Mill
Sire Last Tycoon (IRE) 1983	Mill Princess (IRE); 1977	Irish Lass	Sayajirao
Sire Last Tycoon (IRE) 1983	Mill Princess (IRE); 1977	Irish Lass	Scollata
Dam Batave (IRE) 1982	Posse (USA); 1977	Forli	Aristophanes
Dam Batave (IRE) 1982	Posse (USA); 1977	Forli	Trevisa
Dam Batave (IRE) 1982	Posse (USA); 1977	In Hot Pursuit	Bold Ruler
Dam Batave (IRE) 1982	Posse (USA); 1977	In Hot Pursuit	Lady Be Good
Dam Batave (IRE) 1982	Bon Appetit (GB); 1967	Major Portion	Court Martial
Dam Batave (IRE) 1982	Bon Appetit (GB); 1967	Major Portion	Better Half
Dam Batave (IRE) 1982	Bon Appetit (GB); 1967	Sweet Solera	Solonaway
Dam Batave (IRE) 1982	Bon Appetit (GB); 1967	Sweet Solera	Miss Gammon (Family: 11-f)
