= Jungle Pocket =

Japanese-bred Thoroughbred racehorse

Jungle Pocket ジャングルポケット
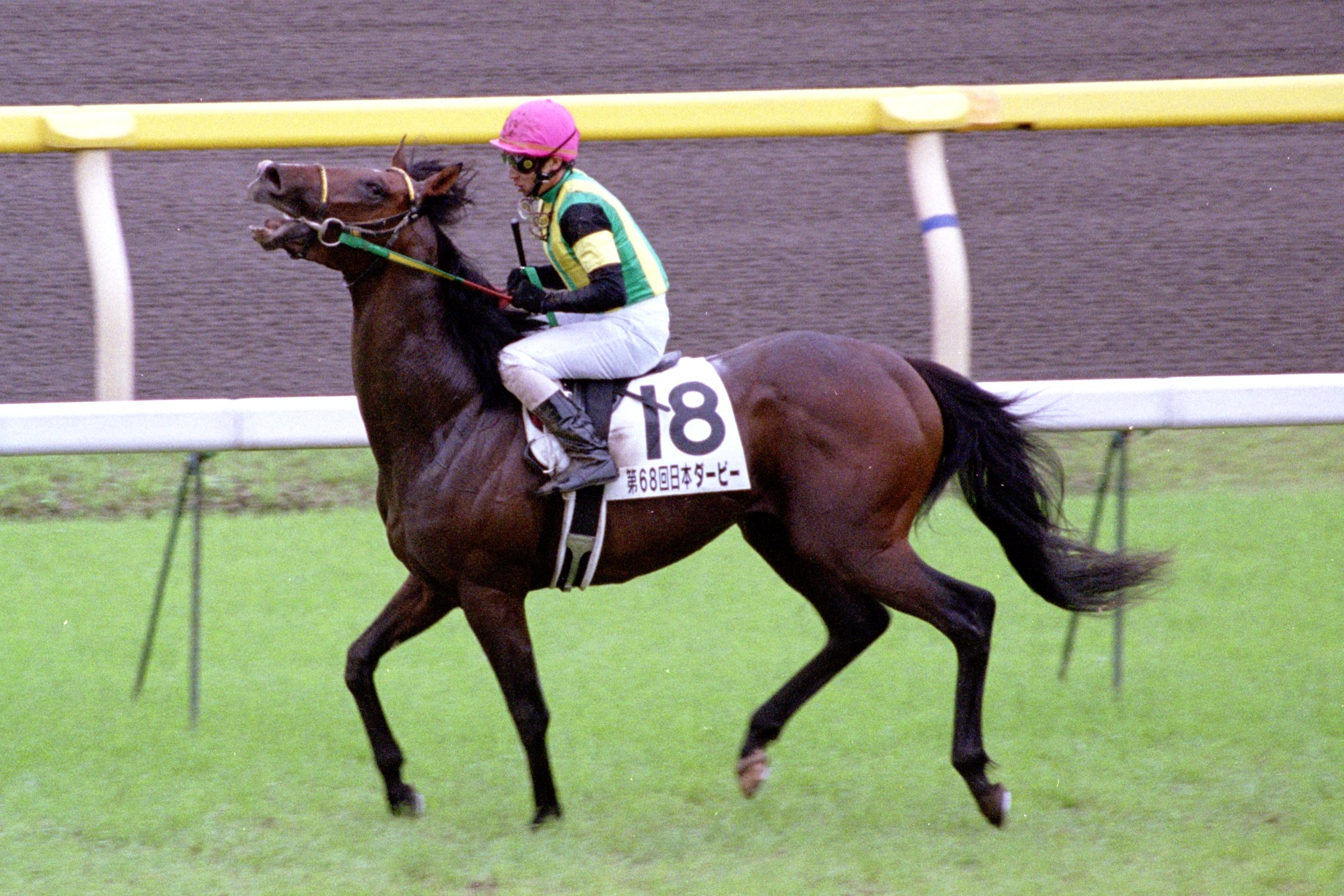
- Jungle Pocket after winning the Tōkyō Yūshun on May 27, 2001.
- Breed: Thoroughbred
- Sire: Tony Bin (IRE)
- Grandsire: Kampala (GB)
- Dam: Dance Charmer (USA)
- Damsire: Nureyev (USA)
- Sex: Stallion
- Foaled: May 7, 1998
- Died: March 2, 2021 (aged 22)
- Country: Japan
- Colour: Bay
- Breeder: Northern Farm
- Owner: Yomoji Saito; Kazuko Yoshida
- Racing colours
- Trainer: Sakae Watanabe
- Jockey: Koichi Tsunoda; Olivier Peslier
- Record: 13: 5-3-2
- Earnings: ¥704,258,000

Major wins
- Sapporo Nisai Stakes (2000); Kyodo News Service Hai (2001); Japan Cup (2001); Japanese Classic Race wins: Tokyo Yushun (2001)

Awards
- Japanese Champion 3-Year-Old Colt (2001); Japanese Horse of the Year (2001)

Honours
- Timeform rating: 131

Jungle Pocket (Japanese: ジャングルポケット, Hepburn: Janguru Poketto; 7 May 1998 – 2 March 2021) was a Japanese Thoroughbred racehorse and sire. In a racing career which lasted from 2000 until 2002 he won five of his thirteen races and ¥704,258,000 in prize money. As a two-year-old he showed promising form by winning two races including the Grade III Sapporo Nisai Stakes in record time. In the following year he won the Tokyo Yushun (Japanese Derby) and defeated an international field to win the Japan Cup. His achievements saw him voted Japanese Champion 3-Year-Old Colt and Japanese Horse of the Year for 2001. After failing to win in 2002 he was retired to stud and has had considerable success as a breeding stallion.

== Background ==
Jungle Pocket was a bay horse standing 16 hands high with a narrow white blaze bred in Japan by Northern Farm. He was sired by the Irish-bred, Italian-trained Tony Bin who won the Prix de l'Arc de Triomphe in 1988 before being exported to stand as a breeding stallion in Japan. Tony Bin's other progeny included Air Groove (Yushun Himba, Tenno Sho), Lady Pastel (Yushun Himba), North Flight (Yasuda Kinen, Mile Championship), Telegnosis (NHK Mile Cup) and Sakura Chitose O (Tenno Sho). His dam Dance Charmer was an unraced daughter of Nureyev. The colt raced in the ownership of Yomoji Saito and was trained during his racing career by Sadao Watanabe. The horse was reportedly named after an episode of the NHK children's television series Okaasan to Issho.

== Racing career ==
=== 2000: two-year-old season ===
Jungle Pocket began his racing career by winning a maiden race over 1800 metres at Sapporo Racecourse on 2 September, beating Tagano Teio and six others. Three weeks later he was moved up in class and faced twelve opponents in the Grade III Sapporo Sansai Stakes over the same course and won from Tagano Teio in a record time of 1:49.6. In the Grade III Radio Tampa Hai Sansai Stakes over 2000 metres at Hanshin Racecourse on 23 December he finished second of the twelve runners behind Agnes Tachyon.

=== 2001: three-year-old season ===
On his three-year-old debut, Jungle Pocket contested the Kyodo Tsushin Hai over 1800 metres at Tokyo Racecourse on 4 February and won from Pregio and ten others. He was then moved up to Grade I class for the Satsuki Sho over 2000 metres at Nakayama Racecourse on 15 April and finished third behind Agnes Tachyon and Dantsu Flame. On 27 May at Tokyo, Jungle Pocket was one of eighteen colts to contest the Tokyo Yushun (Japanese Derby) over 2400 metres. Agnes Tachyon had sustained a career-ending injury, but Dantsu Flame was in the field along with the American-bred Kurofune, winner of the NHK Mile Cup. Ridden by Koichi Tsunoda, Jungle Pocket won by one and a half lengths from Dantsu Flame, with a gap of two and a half lengths back to Dancing Color in third.

After a break of eight weeks, Jungle Pocket returned for the Grade II Sapporo Kinen in August and finished third behind Air Eminem and Fight Commander. Another lengthy absence was followed by a return to Grade I level for the Kikuka-sho over 3000 metres at Kyoto on 21 October and a fourth-place finish behind Manhattan Cafe, Meiner Despot and Air Eminem.

On 25 November, in front of 115,196 spectators at Tokyo, Jungle Pocket was one of fifteen horses to contest the 21st running of the Japan Cup. Ridden by the French jockey Olivier Peslier, he was made 3.2/1 second favourite behind T. M. Opera O, a five-year-old who had won seven previous Grade I races, six of which he won consecutively in the year 2000. The race attracted a strong North American contingent comprising With Anticipation (Man o' War Stakes), Timboroa (Joe Hirsch Turf Classic Invitational Stakes), Cagney (Carleton F. Burke Handicap) and White Heart (Turf Classic Stakes). The other overseas runners were Indigenous from Hong Kong, Golan from Britain and Paolini (Dubai Duty Free) from Germany. The most fancied of the other Japanese runners were Meisho Doto, Stay Gold and Narita Top Road. Peslier restrained the colt towards the rear of the field before switching to the outside to make his challenge in the straight. He caught T. M. Opera O in the final strides and won by a neck, with a gap of three and a half lengths back to Narita Top Road in third. After the race Peslier commented "I'm on top of the world – It is the most marvellous thrill for me to win the Japan Cup because I have ridden in Japan many times and so I'm really delighted. Jungle Pocket is the Derby winner and I am really proud of the way he has run today in this field. I was bumped a little at the start, and he then raced quite a long way back, but he settled well and I got a good run through".

In January 2001 Jungle Pocket was voted Japanese Champion 3-Year-Old Colt and Japanese Horse of the Year in the JRA Awards for 2001.

=== 2002: four-year-old season ===
Jungle Pocket remained in training as a four-year-old in 2002 but failed to win in four races. He made his first appearance in the Hanshin Daishoten in March and finished second to Narita Top Road. In the following month he produced his best performance of the year when he finished a neck second to Manhattan Cafe in the spring version of the Tenno Sho over 3200 metres with Narita Top Road in third place.

Before his last two races the colt entered the ownership of Kazuko Yoshida. In the autumn he finished fifth to Falbrav in the Japan Cup (run that year over 2200 metres at Nakayama) and ended his career by finishing seventh of fourteen behind Symboli Kris S in the Arima Kinen on 22 December.

== Stud record ==
Jungle Pocket was retired from racing to become a breeding stallion at the Yoshida family's Shadai Stallion Station. He later stood in New Zealand and Australia before being moved to the Breeders Stallion Station in Japan where he was based from 2013. He retired from stud duty in 2020, and died on 2 March 2021 after months of deteriorating health.

One of the last crops of Jungle Pocket, a filly named Omataseshimashita, is owned by Shinji Saito, a member of the comedy trio Jungle Pocket (named after the horse) and she has competed in NAR races.

=== Major winners ===
c = colt, f = filly, g = gelding

Grade One winners
Foaled	Name	Sex	Major Wins
2004	Jaguar Mail	c	Tennō Shō (Spring)
2004	Queen Spumante	f	Queen Elizabeth II Commemorative Cup
2005	Tall Poppy	f	Hanshin Juvenile Fillies, Yushun Himba
2005	Oken Bruce Lee	c	Kikuka-shō, Kyōto Daishōten
2005	Jungle Rocket	f	New Zealand Oaks
2006	Tosen Jordan	c	Copa Republica Argentina, American Jockey Club Cup, Sapporo Kinen, Tenno Sho (Autumn)
2008	Aventura	f	Queen Stakes, Shūka Shō
2010	Awardee	c	Sirius Stakes, Nagoya Daishoten, Antares Stakes, Nippon TV Hai, Japan Breeding Farms' Cup Classic
2012	Dear Domus	c	Hokkaido Nisai Yushun, Zen-Nippon Nisai Yushun

Other winners
Foaled	Name	Sex	Major Wins
2004	Fusaichi Ho O	c	Tokyo Sports Hai Nisai Stakes, Radio Nikkei Hai Nisai Stakes, Kyodo Tsushin Hai
2004	Tascata Sorte	c	Kyoto Shimbun Hai, Chukyo Kinen, Sapporo Kinen
2004	Tosen Captain	c	Arlington Cup, Hakodate Kinen
2006	Schon Wald	g	Daily Hai Nisai Stakes
2007	Apricot Fizz	f	Queen Cup, Queen Stakes
2007	Daiwa Falcon	c	Fukushima Kinen (twice)
2008	Magical Pocket	c	Hakodate Nisai Stakes
2008	Verde Green	c	Sankei Sho All Comers, American Jockey Club Cup
2009	Air Saumur	c	Naruo Kinen, Mainichi Ōkan
2010	Derby Fizz	c	Hakodate Kinen
2010	Tyrian Purple	f	Niigata Jump Stakes
2014	Mozu Attraction	g	Elm Stakes
2015	Sanrei Pocket	c	Niigata Daishoten

== In popular culture ==
The Japanese comedy trio Jungle Pocket was named after the horse, with one of the members, Shinji Saito being a fan of the horse.

An anthropomorphized version of Jungle Pocket appears as a character in the Japanese multimedia franchise Umamusume: Pretty Derby, voiced by Yuri Fujimoto. Initially a delinquent, she is inspired to enroll at Tracen Academy after watching a race won by Fuji Kiseki, who becomes her idol. Her rivalries with Agnes Tachyon and Dantsu Flame mirror her real-life counterpart's career, as is her habit of loudly roaring upon winning G1 races, referring to the horse's neighing fit after the 2001 Tokyo Yushun. A theatrical film featuring the character as the protagonist, titled Umamusume: Pretty Derby – Beginning of a New Era, was released in Japan on May 24, 2024.

== Racing form ==
Jungle Pocket won five races out of 13 starts. This data is available on JBIS and netkeiba.

Date	Racecourse	Race	Grade	Distance (Condition)	Entry	HN	Odds (Favored)	Finish	Time	Margins	Jockey	Winner (Runner-up)
2000 – two-year-old season
Sep 2	Sapporo	2yo Newcomer		1,800 m (Good)	8	6	9.8 (5)	1st	1:52.0	–0.1	Teruhiko Chida	(Tagano Teio)
Sep 23	Sapporo	Sapporo Sansai Stakes	3	1,800 m (Firm)	13	7	9.2 (5)	1st	R1:49.6	–0.2	Teruhiko Chida	(Tagano Teio)
Dec 23	Hanshin	Radio Tampa Hai Sansai Stakes	3	2,000 m (Firm)	12	4	4.8 (3)	2nd	2:01.2	0.4	Koichi Tsunoda	Agnes Tachyon
2001 – three-year-old season
Feb 4	Tokyo	Kyodo News Service Hai	3	1,800 m (Firm)	12	8	1.4 (1)	1st	1:47.9	–0.3	Koichi Tsunoda	(Pregio)
Apr 15	Nakayama	Satsuki Sho	1	2,000 m (Firm)	18	1	3.7 (2)	3rd	2:00.6	0.3	Koichi Tsunoda	Agnes Tachyon
May 27	Tokyo	Tokyo Yushun	1	2,400 m (Soft)	18	18	2.3 (1)	1st	2:27.0	–0.2	Koichi Tsunoda	(Dantsu Flame)
Aug 19	Sapporo	Sapporo Kinen	2	2,000 m (Firm)	9	7	1.3 (1)	3rd	2:00.5	0.4	Koichi Tsunoda	Air Eminem
Oct 21	Kyoto	Kikuka Sho	1	3,000 m (Firm)	15	13	2.3 (1)	4th	3:07.6	0.4	Koichi Tsunoda	Manhattan Cafe
Nov 25	Tokyo	Japan Cup	1	2,400 m (Firm)	15	6	4.2 (2)	1st	2:23.8	0.0	Olivier Peslier	(T. M. Opera O)
2002 – four-year-old season
Mar 17	Hanshin	Hanshin Daishoten	2	3,000 m (Firm)	9	8	2.2 (2)	2nd	3:08.2	0.3	Futoshi Komaki	Narita Top Road
Apr 28	Kyoto	Tenno Sho (Spring)	1	3,200 m (Firm)	11	7	3.5 (3)	2nd	3:19.5	0.0	Yutaka Take	Manhattan Cafe
Nov 24	Nakayama	Japan Cup	1	2,200 m (Firm)	16	10	4.2 (3)	5th	2:12.5	0.3	Yutaka Take	Falbrav
Dec 22	Nakayama	Arima Kinen	1	2,500 m (Good)	14	9	4.5 (3)	7th	2:33.9	1.3	Shinji Fujita	Symboli Kris S

Legend:
Turf

- R indicated that it was a record time finish.

== Pedigree ==
Pedigree of Jungle Pocket (JPN), bay stallion, 1998
Sire Tony Bin (IRE) 1983	Kampala (GB); 1969	Kalamoun	Zeddaan
Sire Tony Bin (IRE) 1983	Kampala (GB); 1969	Kalamoun	Khairunissa
Sire Tony Bin (IRE) 1983	Kampala (GB); 1969	State Pension	Only for Life
Sire Tony Bin (IRE) 1983	Kampala (GB); 1969	State Pension	Lorelei
Sire Tony Bin (IRE) 1983	Severn Bridge (GB); 1966	Hornbeam	Hyperion
Sire Tony Bin (IRE) 1983	Severn Bridge (GB); 1966	Hornbeam	Thicket
Sire Tony Bin (IRE) 1983	Severn Bridge (GB); 1966	Priddy Fair	Preciptic
Sire Tony Bin (IRE) 1983	Severn Bridge (GB); 1966	Priddy Fair	Campanette
Dam Dance Charmer (USA) 1989	Nureyev (USA); 1977	Northern Dancer	Nearctic
Dam Dance Charmer (USA) 1989	Nureyev (USA); 1977	Northern Dancer	Natalma
Dam Dance Charmer (USA) 1989	Nureyev (USA); 1977	Special	Forli
Dam Dance Charmer (USA) 1989	Nureyev (USA); 1977	Special	Thong
Dam Dance Charmer (USA) 1989	Skillful Joy (USA); 1978	Nodouble	Noholme
Dam Dance Charmer (USA) 1989	Skillful Joy (USA); 1978	Nodouble	Abla-Jay
Dam Dance Charmer (USA) 1989	Skillful Joy (USA); 1978	Skillful Miss	Daryls Joy
Dam Dance Charmer (USA) 1989	Skillful Joy (USA); 1978	Skillful Miss	Poliniss (Family 11-g)

== See also ==
- Fuji Kiseki - 1994 Asahi Hai Sansai Stakes winner; shared a common owner, trainer, and jockey
