= Air Shakur =

Japanese thoroughbred racehorse and sire

Air Shakur エアシャカール
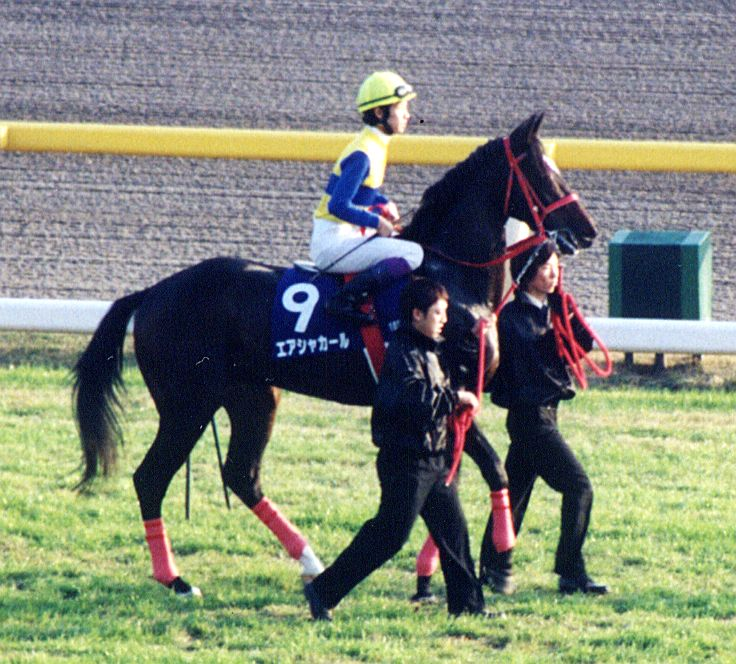
- Air Shakur in November 2000 at Tokyo Racecourse.
- Breed: Thoroughbred
- Sire: Sunday Silence
- Grandsire: Halo
- Dam: I Dreamed a Dream
- Damsire: Well Decorated
- Sex: Stallion
- Foaled: February 26, 1997
- Died: March 13, 2003 (aged 6)
- Country: Japan
- Colour: Dark bay
- Breeder: Shadai Farm
- Owner: Lucky Field Co., Ltd.
- Racing colours
- Trainer: Hideyuki Mori
- Jockey: Yutaka Take
- Record: 20:4-6-1
- Earnings: ¥545,050,000

Major wins
- Japanese Classic Race wins: Satsuki Sho (2000); Kikuka Sho (2000)

Awards
- JRA Award for Best Three-Year-Old Colt (2000)

Air Shakur (Japanese: エアシャカール, Hepburn: Ea Shakāru; February 26, 1997 – March 13, 2003) was a Japanese Thoroughbred racehorse and sire. He won the 2000 Satsuki Shō and Kikuka Shō, achieving two of the Triple Crown wins and was selected as the JRA Award for Best three-Year-Old Colt (Note: The award is now known as the JRA Award for Best Three-Year-Old Colt. In Japan, horses were 1 year old at the time of birth until 2000. It is necessary to keep this in mind when reading horse racing materials before 2000, as a horse that is "three years old" is really only 2 years old, and et cetera.) that year. In the Tokyo Yūshun (Japanese Derby), he narrowly missed winning by a nose of 7 cm, earning him the title of "quasi-Triple Crown winner." After becoming an older horse in 2001, he struggled to win races and was retired after finishing ninth in the 2002 Arima Kinen.

== Background ==
Air Shakur was sired by 13-year leading sire in Japan Sunday Silence, who also sired famous Japanese racehorses Fuji Kiseki, Silence Suzuka, Stay Gold, and Special Week, along with many other successful progeny. Estimates put the amount won by Sunday Silence's progeny in Japan at approximately 80 billion Japanese yen. Air Shakur also had famous American racehorse Native Dancer in his damsire's line. Native Dancer was voted third in the Blood-Horse magazine list of the Top 100 Racehorses of the 20th Century. Air Shakur also had twice Prix de l'Arc de Triomphe winner and undefeated racehorse Ribot in his mother's line. His name comes from the prefix 'Air' and the real name of the American hip-hop MC and actor Tupac Shakur.

When Yutaka Take rode the horse during training before its maiden race, he said, 'I thought this horse would definitely become one that could win a graded race in the future,' and described the horse's aura as 'like a smaller version of Special Week.' On the other hand, the horse had a very fiery temperament. Take commented on this, saying, 'He was a horse that seemed to have collected all the bad traits of Sunday Silence's offspring. He simply wouldn't run straight, and he was extremely difficult to ride,' and he even said, 'I want to see what's going on in his head.' Due to his tendency to be distracted, the entire stable staff ended up taking care of him. At that time, it was common for each staff member to be responsible for two horses, but trainer Hideyuki Mori said, 'We abolished the responsibility system.' Although now mainstream, abolishing the responsibility system was unusual at that time.

== Racing career ==
=== 1999: Two-year-old season ===
The horse's former name was Air Scudetto. Air Shakur made his debut on October 31, 1999, in a maiden race at Tokyo Racecourse. Although it finished fifth in the maiden race, he secured his first victory in his second start in a winless race. After that, he won the Hopeful Stakes, (Note: Not to be confused with the American or current Japanese Hopeful Stakes, this refers to Central Horse Racing's Open Special Race's Hopeful Stakes that was discontinued in 2013. The current Hopeful Stakes in Japan is not a promotion of this race, and is instead a different race that was moved and renamed.) ending his two-year-old season with two wins in four races and emerged as one of the candidates for the Classics.

=== 2000: Three-year-old season ===
In early 2000, as a three-year-old, Air Shakur placed second in the Yayoi Sho before running in the Satsuki Sho. He narrowly defeated Daitaku Riva by a neck, claiming his first GI victory. After the Satsuki Sho, there were plans announced for him to compete in the King George VI & Queen Elizabeth Diamond Stakes.

In the Tokyo Yushun (Japanese Derby), he narrowly lost by just 7 cm to Agnes Flight, finishing second. After the Derby, he participated as scheduled in the King George VI & Queen Elizabeth Diamond Stakes at Ascot Racecourse but finished fifth behind Bonjour (horse).

In the autumn, Air Shakur started his campaign with the Kobe Shimbun Hai but finished third, unable to make a move in the inside lanes and unable to catch up in the straight, which was such a complete defeat that jockey Yutaka Take commented, "No growth is seen in its temperament." However, in the main race, the Kikuka Sho, he wore a ring bit to prevent veering inward and ran along the inside rail throughout the race, managing to edge out Toho Shiden by a neck to claim victory. Remarkably, Air Shakur became a dual crown horse, winning both the Satsuki Sho and the Kikuka Sho.

After the Kikuka Sho, Air Shakur ran in the Japan Cup. The highly anticipated matchup against T. M. Opera O, who had been on a six-race winning streak including three G1 victories that year, ended with a disastrous 14th-place finish for Air Shakur. Additionally, in this race, his generation peers, Derby winner Agnes Flight (13th), NHK Mile Cup winner Eagle Cafe (15th), and Oaks winner Silk Primadonna (16th, last place), all suffered defeats.

=== Four-year-old season and beyond ===
In 2001, when Yutaka Take moved his riding base overseas, Masayoshi Ebina became the main jockey for Air Shakur. In the Sankei Osaka Hai, he started off well with a second-place finish behind Toho Dream, but in the next race, the Tenno Sho (Spring), he finished 8th, and he also lost 5th place in the Takarazuka Kinen. By autumn, he suffered from transport-induced pneumonia and was unable to race.

At age five, Air Shakur made a comeback in the Sankei Osaka Hai, finishing 2nd and showing signs of recovery. In the following Kinko Sho, his partnership with Yutaka Take was restored, making him the favorite, but he was defeated by Tsurumaru Boy, finishing 2nd. Afterwards, in the Takarazuka Kinen, he shared the spotlight with Dantsu Flame but finished 4th. In autumn, he managed to place on the board with a 4th in the Tenno Sho (Autumn), but suffered a heavy defeat, finishing 12th in the Japan Cup. He also had no significant success in the Arima Kinen, finishing 9th, and retired after this race.

== Retirement ==
After retiring from racing, he became a stallion and was kept at the Breeders Stallion Station, but on March 13, 2003, three months after his retirement, he suffered a broken left hind leg in an accident while grazing and was euthanised.

== Stud career ==
Air Shakur had four offspring (all fillies), three of which entered central horse racing. On October 24, 2006, one of these four, Air Miracle, earned a victory in Hokkaido racing, marking the first win for an Air Shakur offspring. Then, on July 28, 2007, Air Fergie won an ungraded race at Hakodate Racecourse, giving Air Shakur's progeny their first JRA victory. However, of the three that entered central racing, only Air Fergie managed to win; the other two never won, and all four were eventually deregistered without achieving significant success. Among the offspring, Air Fergie and Maji Blanche became broodmares, but their progeny were skewed toward male horses, and as a result, the bloodline has already become extinct.

== In popular culture ==
An anthropomorphized version of Air Shakur appears as a character in the Japanese multimedia franchise Umamusume: Pretty Derby, voiced by Minami Tsuda. She is an intimidating and cold, yet calculating and logical analyst skilled with computer programming and disc jockeying. While normally a gruff perfectionist, she goes out of her way to help her friends, in particular her roommate Meisho Doto and willing research subject Fine Motion.

== Racing form ==
Air Shakur won four races out of 20 starts. This data is available in JBIS, netkeiba and racingpost.

Date	Racecourse	Race	Grade	Distance (Condition)	Entry	HN	Odds (Favored)	Finish	Time	Margins	Jockey	Winner (Runner-up)
1999 – two-year-old season
Oct 31	Tokyo	2YO Newcomer		2,000 m (Firm)	13	2	3.4 (2)	5th	2:04.3	0.6	Yutaka Take	Yuwa Caesar
Nov 21	Kyoto	2YO Maiden		1,600 m (Firm)	14	2	3.2 (1)	1st	1:36.4	–0.1	Yutaka Take	(Eishin Momotaro)
Dec 11	Hanshin	2YO Allowance	1W	1,600 m (Firm)	11	4	2.9 (1)	2nd	1:36.7	0.1	Mirco Demuro	Purple Ebisu
Dec 26	Nakayama	Hopeful Stakes	OP	2,000 m (Firm)	13	4	2.7 (1)	1st	2:05.9	0.0	Yutaka Take	(Meiner Pharaoh)
2000 – three-year-old season
Mar 5	Nakayama	Yayoi Sho	2	2,000 m (Firm)	16	16	7.3 (4)	2nd	2:02.5	0.2	Yutaka Take	Fusaichi Zenon
Apr 16	Nakayama	Satsuki Sho	1	2,000 m (Good)	18	16	3.4 (2)	1st	2:01.8	0.0	Yutaka Take	(Daitaku Riva)
May 28	Tokyo	Tokyo Yushun	1	2,400 m (Firm)	18	2	2.0 (1)	2nd	2:26.2	0.0	Yutaka Take	Agnes Flight
Jul 29	Ascot	KGVI & QE Stakes	1	12 f (Firm)	7	7	10/1 (3)	5th	2:31.3	1.3	Yutaka Take	Montjeu
Sep 24	Hanshin	Kobe Shimbun Hai	2	2,000 m (Firm)	12	4	1.7 (1)	3rd	2:02.0	0.4	Yutaka Take	Fusaichi Sonic
Oct 22	Kyoto	Kikuka Sho	1	3,000 m (Firm)	18	15	2.8 (2)	1st	3:04.7	0.0	Yutaka Take	(Toho Shiden)
Nov 26	Tokyo	Japan Cup	1	2,400 m (Firm)	16	9	9.5 (3)	14th	2:28.2	2.1	Yutaka Take	T M Opera O
2001 – four-year-old season
Apr 1	Hanshin	Sankei Osaka Hai	2	2,000 m (Firm)	14	3	13.2 (4)	2nd	1:58.5	0.1	Masayoshi Ebina	Toho Dream
Apr 29	Kyoto	Tenno Sho (Spring)	1	3,200 m (Firm)	12	10	7.2 (4)	8th	3:17.9	1.7	Masayoshi Ebina	T M Opera O
Jun 24	Hanshin	Takarazuka Kinen	1	2,200 m (Firm)	12	8	13.4 (3)	5th	2:12.3	0.6	Masayoshi Ebina	Meisho Doto
2002 – five-year-old season
Mar 31	Hanshin	Sankei Osaka Hai	2	2,000 m (Firm)	14	1	4.4 (3)	2nd	1:59.5	0.4	Mirco Demuro	Sunrise Pegasus
May 25	Chukyo	Kinko Sho	2	2,000 m (Firm)	18	18	1.8 (1)	2nd	1:58.5	0.2	Yutaka Take	Tsurumaru Boy
Jun 23	Hanshin	Takarazuka Kinen	1	2,200 m (Firm)	12	4	2.9 (2)	4th	2:13.2	0.3	Kent Desormeaux	Dantsu Flame
Oct 27	Nakayama	Tenno Sho (Autumn)	1	2,000 m (Firm)	18	14	8.6 (6)	4th	1:58.8	0.3	Yutaka Take	Symboli Kris S
Nov 24	Nakayama	Japan Cup	1	2,200 m (Firm)	16	16	19.7 (7)	12th	2:13.4	1.2	Katsuharu Tanaka	Falbrav
Dec 22	Nakayama	Arima Kinen	1	2,500 m (Good)	14	4	21.1 (7)	9th	2:34.1	1.5	Norihiro Yokoyama	Symboli Kris S

Legend:
Turf

== Pedigree ==
Pedigree of Air Shakur (JPN), dark bay stallion, 1994
Sire Sunday Silence (USA) 1986	Halo (USA); 1969	Hail to Reason	Turn-To
Sire Sunday Silence (USA) 1986	Halo (USA); 1969	Hail to Reason	Nothirdchance
Sire Sunday Silence (USA) 1986	Halo (USA); 1969	Cosmah	Cosmic Bomb
Sire Sunday Silence (USA) 1986	Halo (USA); 1969	Cosmah	Almahmoud
Sire Sunday Silence (USA) 1986	Wishing Well (USA); 1975	Understanding	Promised Land
Sire Sunday Silence (USA) 1986	Wishing Well (USA); 1975	Understanding	Pretty Ways
Sire Sunday Silence (USA) 1986	Wishing Well (USA); 1975	Mountain Flower	Montparnasse
Sire Sunday Silence (USA) 1986	Wishing Well (USA); 1975	Mountain Flower	Edelweiss
Dam I Dreamed a Dream (USA) 1987	Well Decorated (USA); 1978	Raja Baba	Bold Ruler
Dam I Dreamed a Dream (USA) 1987	Well Decorated (USA); 1978	Raja Baba	Missy Baba
Dam I Dreamed a Dream (USA) 1987	Well Decorated (USA); 1978	Paris Breeze	Majestic Prince
Dam I Dreamed a Dream (USA) 1987	Well Decorated (USA); 1978	Paris Breeze	Tudor Jet
Dam I Dreamed a Dream (USA) 1987	Hidden Trail (USA); 1975	Gleaming	Herbager
Dam I Dreamed a Dream (USA) 1987	Hidden Trail (USA); 1975	Gleaming	A Gleam
Dam I Dreamed a Dream (USA) 1987	Hidden Trail (USA); 1975	Tobacco Trail	Ribot
Dam I Dreamed a Dream (USA) 1987	Hidden Trail (USA); 1975	Tobacco Trail	On the Trail (Family:F4-r)

- Air Deja Vu, who finished second in the 1998 Yushun Himba (Oaks), is his half-sister.
- Air Messiah, who won the 2005 Shuka Sho, is his niece.
