= Madelia (horse) =

French-bred Thoroughbred racehorse

- Sire: Caro
- Grandsire: Fortino
- Dam: Moonmadness
- Damsire: Tom Fool
- Sex: Mare
- Foaled: 1974
- Country: France
- Colour: Chestnut
- Breeder: Daniel Wildenstein
- Owner: Daniel Wildenstein
- Trainer: Angel Penna, Sr.
- Record: 4 starts, 4 wins
- Earnings: ₣1,385,000

Major wins
- Poule d'Essai des Pouliches (1977); Prix Saint-Alary (1977); Prix de Diane (1977)

Awards
- French Champion Three-Year-Old Filly (1977)
- Last updated on 2 November 2010

Madelia (1974–2004) was an undefeated French Thoroughbred racehorse that was the French Champion Three-Year-Old Filly in 1977.

== Breeding ==
She was by the multiple Group One (G1) winner, Caro, her dam, Moonmadness was by the good American racehorse and sire, Tom Fool. Madelia was bred and raced by leading French horseman, Daniel Wildenstein, and trained by the Argentine-born and future U. S. Racing Hall of Fame trainer, Angel Penna, Sr.

== Racing record ==
Madelia made her racing debut on April 18, 1977 with a win in a 1,600 meter (1 mile) event at Saint-Cloud Racecourse. She then won the Poule d'Essai des Pouliches and the Prix Saint-Alary at Longchamp Racecourse and, in her final start, at Chantilly Racecourse, won the Classic Prix de Diane.

== Breeding record ==
Retired undefeated to serve as a broodmare for her owner, between 1980 and 1991 Madelia produced ten foals. While at stud, she was bred to leading sires including Northern Dancer, Affirmed, Exclusive Native, Spectacular Bid, El Gran Senor, Nureyev, Blushing Groom, Chief's Crown, and Alysheba. While none of her offspring were able to replicate their mare by winning any classics, Madelia did produce some useful racehorses. Her first foal, Magdalena (Northern Dancer), finished third in the 1983 Coronation Stakes at Royal Ascot and her second foal, Claude Monet (Nureyev) won the 1984 Dante Stakes. Marignan (Blushing Groom) came closest to emulating his classic winning dam when finishing second in the 1992 Prix du Jockey Club while Moonlight Dance (Alysheba) became the broodmare's sole Group One winner when taking the Prix Saint-Alary in 1994 - a race won by Madelia seventeen years earlier. Madelia also found success as a grand-dam with the aforementioned Moonlight Dance producing Millionaia, runner up in the 2004 Prix de Diane, and Fencing Master, second in the 2009 Dewhurst Stakes. Madelia's unraced filly Moon Indigo (El Gran Senor), after being covered by Sunday Silence, gave birth to Admire Sunday who finished second in the 1998 Hanshin Himba Stakes. After her retirement to stud, she produced the classic winning Tall Poppy, classic placed Fusaichi Ho O and champion Japanese three-year-old filly Aventura.

Madelia died at the age of thirty from old age.

== Pedigree ==
Pedigree of Madelia (FR), Chestnut mare, 1974
Sire Caro (IRE) Gr. 1967	Fortino II (FR); Gr. 1959	Grey Sovereign	Nasrullah
Sire Caro (IRE) Gr. 1967	Fortino II (FR); Gr. 1959	Grey Sovereign	Kong
Sire Caro (IRE) Gr. 1967	Fortino II (FR); Gr. 1959	Ranavalo	Relic
Sire Caro (IRE) Gr. 1967	Fortino II (FR); Gr. 1959	Ranavalo	Navarra
Sire Caro (IRE) Gr. 1967	Chambord (GB); Ch. 1955	Chamoissaire	Precipitation
Sire Caro (IRE) Gr. 1967	Chambord (GB); Ch. 1955	Chamoissaire	Snowberry
Sire Caro (IRE) Gr. 1967	Chambord (GB); Ch. 1955	Life Hill	Solario
Sire Caro (IRE) Gr. 1967	Chambord (GB); Ch. 1955	Life Hill	Lady of the Snows
Dam Moonmadness (USA) Ch. 1963	Tom Fool (USA); B. 1949	Menow	Pharamond
Dam Moonmadness (USA) Ch. 1963	Tom Fool (USA); B. 1949	Menow	Alcibiades
Dam Moonmadness (USA) Ch. 1963	Tom Fool (USA); B. 1949	Gaga	Bull Dog
Dam Moonmadness (USA) Ch. 1963	Tom Fool (USA); B. 1949	Gaga	Alpoise
Dam Moonmadness (USA) Ch. 1963	Sunset (GB); Ch. 1950	Hyperion	Gainsborough
Dam Moonmadness (USA) Ch. 1963	Sunset (GB); Ch. 1950	Hyperion	Selene
Dam Moonmadness (USA) Ch. 1963	Sunset (GB); Ch. 1950	Fair Ranger	Bois Roussel
Dam Moonmadness (USA) Ch. 1963	Sunset (GB); Ch. 1950	Fair Ranger	Point Duty (Family: 1)

== See also ==
- List of leading Thoroughbred racehorses
