= Tall Poppy =

Japanese Thoroughbred racehorse

Tall Poppy トールポピー
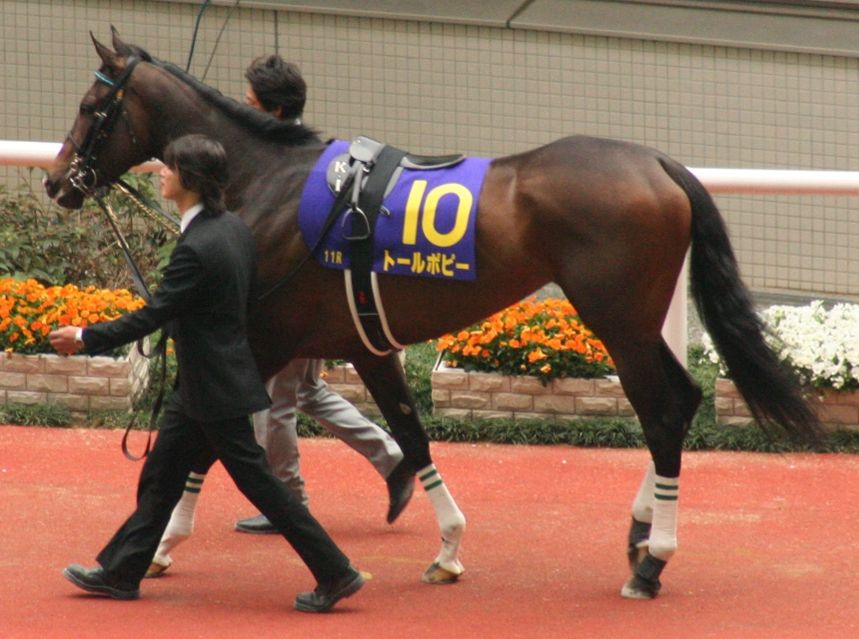
- Tall Poppy in April 2008
- Breed: Thoroughbred
- Sire: Jungle Pocket
- Grandsire: Tony Bin
- Dam: Admire Sunday
- Damsire: Sunday Silence
- Sex: Mare
- Foaled: 30 January 2005
- Died: 22 June 2012 (aged 7)
- Country: Japan
- Colour: Bay
- Breeder: Northern Farm
- Owner: U Carrot Farm
- Racing colours
- Trainer: Katsuhiko Sumii
- Jockey: Kenichi Ikezoe
- Record: 14: 3-3-0
- Earnings: 217,992,000 JPY

Major wins
- Hanshin Juvenile Fillies (2007); Japanese Classic Tiara Race wins: Yushun Himba (2008)

Awards
- JRA Award for Best Two-Year-Old Filly (2007)
- Last updated on 26 March 2024

Tall Poppy (Japanese: トールポピー, Hepburn: Tōru Popī; 30 January 2005 - 22 June 2012) was a Japanese Thoroughbred racehorse and broodmare. In 2007 she took the JRA Award for Best Two-Year-Old Filly after winning two of her four races including the Hanshin Juvenile Fillies. In the following year she ran second in the Tulip Sho before recording her biggest win in the Yushun Himba. She finished unplaced in seven subsequent races and was retired from racing in 2010.

== Background ==
Tall Poppy was a bay mare with a large white star bred in Hokkaido by Northern Farm. During her racing career she carried the green, white and red colours of U Carrot Farm and was trained by Katsuhiko Sumii.

She was from the third crop of foals sired by Jungle Pocket who won the Tokyo Yushun and the Japan Cup in 2001. He went on to become a breeding stallion whose other foals included Jaguar Mail (Tenno Sho).

Tall Poppy's dam Admire Sunday showed high class form, winning three races and finishing second in the Hanshin Himba Stakes. As a broodmare she also produced Tall Poppy's full sister Aventura who won the Shuka Sho in 2011. She was a granddaughter of the undefeated French mare Madelia.

== Racing career ==
=== 2007: two-year-old season ===
Tall Poppy began her racing career on 8 July at Hanshin Racecourse in a contest for previously unraced juveniles over 1800 metres in which she finished second to Earnestly, a colt who went on to win several major races including the Takarazuka Kinen. After a break of over three months she returned to the track in October for a maiden race at Kyoto Racecourse and recorded her first victory as she narrowly prevailed from the colt Shining Day. On 11 November at the same track, the filly ran second to the colt Yamanin Kingly (later to win the Sapporo Kinen) in the Kigiku Sho.

At Hanshin on 2 December Tall Poppy raced against all-female competition for the first time when she contested the Hanshin Juvenile Fillies. Ridden by Kenichi Ikezoe, she started the 5.6/1 third favourite behind Odile and Aim At Vip (first and second in the Fantasy Stakes) in an eighteen-runner field. After turning into the straight in eighth place she produced a strong late run to win by a neck and half a length from Reve d'Amour and Aim At Vip.

In the official Japanese rankings for 2007, Tall Poppy was rated the best juvenile filly, one pound ahead of Reve d'Amour and four pounds behind the top-rated colt Goshawk Ken. In January 2008 at the JRA Awards for 2007 Tall Poppy took the JRA Award for Best Two-Year-Old Filly.

=== 2008: three-year-old season ===
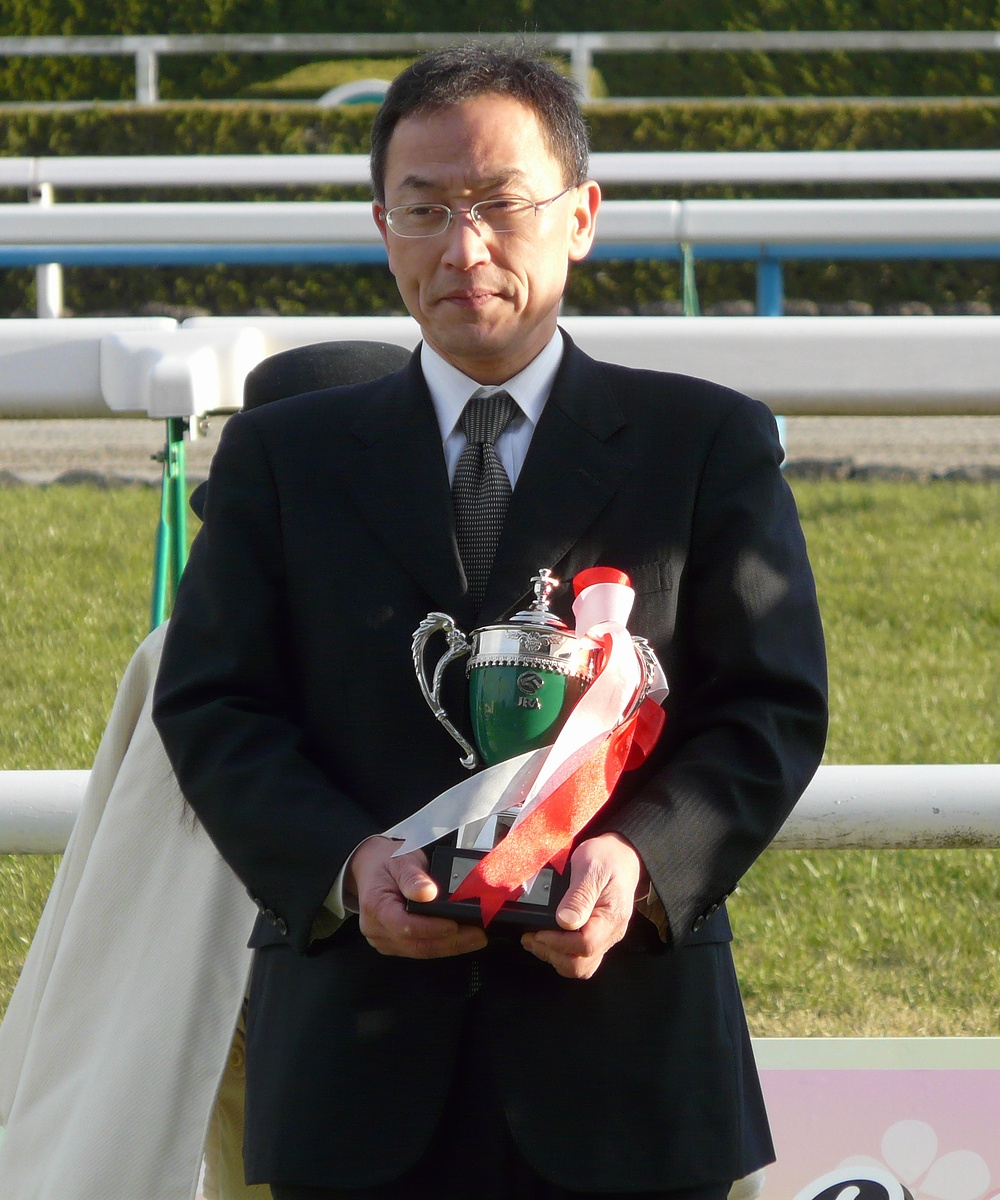
Tall Poppy's trainer Katsuhiko Sumii

On 8 March at Hanshin, Tall Poppy made her first appearance as a three-year-old in the 1600 metre Tulip Sho (a trial race for the Oka Sho) and finished a close second to Air Pascale. In the Oka Sho over the same course and distance five weeks later she started joint-favourite with the Daily Hai Queen Cup winner Little Amapola in a seventeen-runner field. The race resulted in a "blanket finish" which saw the outsider Reginetta narrowly prevailing from F T Maia and So Magic, and although Tall Poppy came home eighth she was only two and a half lengths behind the winner.

The 69th running of the Yushun Himba over 2400 metres at Tokyo Racecourse on 25 May attracted a field of eighteen, and Tall Poppy was made the 8.7/1 fourth choice in the betting behind Little Amapola, Red Agate (Flora Stakes) and So Magic. The other runners included Black Emblem (Flower Cup), Reginetta, Odile, F T Maia, Air Pascale and Meine Ratsel (Fillies' Revue). After racing in mid division Tall Poppy made a strong run up the inside in the straight and got up in the final strides to win by a head from F T Maia. An enquiry was held into possible interference caused by Tall Poppy as she made her challenge but after 30 minutes of deliberation the judges left the result unchanged.

After a break of almost four months Tall Poppy returned in the Rose Stakes over 1800 metres at Hanshin in September and finished sixth behind Meiner Ratsel. In the Shuka Sho over 2000 metres at Kyoto saw Tall Poppy start the 2.6/1 favourite but come home tenth of the eighteen runners behind Black Emblem. This race resulted in another bunched finish with less than six lengths covering the first sixteen to cross the line and Tall Poppy was only three and a quarter lengths behind the winner.

=== 2009 & 2010: four & five-year-old seasons ===
Tall Poppy began her third campaign by running unplaced behind Kiss To Heaven in the Nakayama Himba Stakes over 1800 metres at Nakayama Racecourse on 15 March. She was then off the track for seven months before returning in autumn. She failed to recapture her best form as she finished unplaced in the Fuchu Himba Stakes, the Turquoise Stakes and the Aichi Hai.

Tall Poppy remained in training as a five-year-old but made only one appearance, finishing seventeenth of the eighteen runners in the Hanshin Himba Stakes on 10 April. She was subsequently retired from racing the following day.

== Racing form ==
Tall Poppy won three races in 14 starts. This data is available in JBIS and netkeiba.

Date	Track	Race	Grade	Distance (Condition)	Entry	HN	Odds (Favored)	Finish	Time	Margins	Jockey	Winner (Runner-up)
2007 – two-year-old season
Jul 8	Hanshin	2YO debut		1800m（Firm）	15	4	3.3（2）	2nd	1:49.0	0.3	Kenichi Ikezoe	Earnestly
Oct 20	Kyoto	2YO maiden		2000m（Soft）	11	5	2.2（1）	1st	2:02.2	0.0	Kenichi Ikezoe	(Shining Day)
Nov 11	Kyoto	Kigiku Sho	ALW (1W)	1800m（Firm）	13	4	5.6（2）	2nd	1:47.5	0.0	Kenichi Ikezoe	Yamanin Kingly
Dec 2	Hanshin	Hanshin Juvenile Fillies	1	1600m（Firm）	18	15	6.6（3）	1st	1:33.8	0.0	Kenichi Ikezoe	(Reve d'Amour)
2008 – three-year-old season
Mar 8	Hanshin	Tulip Sho	3	1600m（Firm）	16	2	2.2（1）	2nd	1:35.8	0.0	Kenichi Ikezoe	Air Pascale
Apr 13	Hanshin	Oka Sho	1	1600m（Firm）	17	10	3.8（1）	8th	1:34.8	0.4	Kenichi Ikezoe	Reginetta
May 25	Tokyo	Yushun Himba	1	2400m（Good）	18	15	9.7（4）	1st	2:28.0	0.0	Kenichi Ikezoe	(F T Maia)
Sep 21	Hanshin	Rose Stakes	2	1800m（Soft）	18	1	4.0（2）	6th	1:48.0	0.7	Kenichi Ikezoe	Meine Ratsel
Oct 19	Kyoto	Shuka Sho	1	2000m (Firm）	18	11	3.6（1）	10th	1:58.9	0.5	Kenichi Ikezoe	Black Emblem
2009 – four-year-old season
Mar 15	Nakayama	Nakayama Himba Stakes	3	1800m（Good）	16	16	6.5（3）	10th	1:49.8	0.7	Kenichi Ikezoe	Kiss to Heaven
Oct 18	Tokyo	Fuchu Himba Stakes	3	1800m（Firm）	18	3	7.8（5）	12th	1:46.0	1.4	Kenichi Ikezoe	Mood Indigo
Dec 6	Nakayama	Turquoise Stakes	OP	1600m（Good）	14	14	8.3（5）	12th	1:34.2	1.2	Kenichi Ikezoe	Wedding Fujiko
Dec 19	Chukyo	Aichi Hai	3	2000m（Firm）	18	14	35.4（12）	16th	2:01.3	1.6	Daisaku Matsuda	Little Amapola
2010 – five-year-old season
Apr 10	Hanshin	Hanshin Himba Stakes	2	1400m（Firm）	18	14	62.2（12）	17th	1:21.9	1.7	Kenichi Ikezoe	I Am Kamino Mago

Legend:
Turf

== Breeding record ==
After her retirement from racing, Tall Poppy became a broodmare at Northern Farm, but produced only two recorded foals before her death:

- Oriental Poppy, a bay filly, foaled in 2011, sired by King Kamehameha. Failed to win in four races.
- unnamed bay filly, 2012, by King Kamehameha.

On 22 June 2012, Tall Poppy died at Northern Farm due to volvulus.

== Pedigree ==
Pedigree of Tall Poppy (JPN), bay mare 2005
Sire Jungle Pocket (JPN) 1998	Tony Bin (IRE); 1983	Kampala (GB)	Kalamoun
Sire Jungle Pocket (JPN) 1998	Tony Bin (IRE); 1983	Kampala (GB)	State Pension
Sire Jungle Pocket (JPN) 1998	Tony Bin (IRE); 1983	Severn Bridge (GB)	Hornbeam
Sire Jungle Pocket (JPN) 1998	Tony Bin (IRE); 1983	Severn Bridge (GB)	Priddy Fair
Sire Jungle Pocket (JPN) 1998	Dance Charmer (USA); 1990	Nureyev	Northern Dancer (CAN)
Sire Jungle Pocket (JPN) 1998	Dance Charmer (USA); 1990	Nureyev	Special
Sire Jungle Pocket (JPN) 1998	Dance Charmer (USA); 1990	Skilful Joy	Nodouble
Sire Jungle Pocket (JPN) 1998	Dance Charmer (USA); 1990	Skilful Joy	Skilful Miss
Dam Admire Sunday (JPN) 1995	Sunday Silence (USA); 1986	Halo	Hail To Reason
Dam Admire Sunday (JPN) 1995	Sunday Silence (USA); 1986	Halo	Cosmah
Dam Admire Sunday (JPN) 1995	Sunday Silence (USA); 1986	Wishing Well	Understanding
Dam Admire Sunday (JPN) 1995	Sunday Silence (USA); 1986	Wishing Well	Mountain Flower
Dam Admire Sunday (JPN) 1995	Moon Indigo (USA); 1986	El Gran Senor	Northern Dancer (CAN)
Dam Admire Sunday (JPN) 1995	Moon Indigo (USA); 1986	El Gran Senor	Sex Appeal
Dam Admire Sunday (JPN) 1995	Moon Indigo (USA); 1986	Madelia (FR)	Caro (IRE)
Dam Admire Sunday (JPN) 1995	Moon Indigo (USA); 1986	Madelia (FR)	Moonmadness (USA) (Family 1-p)

- Tall Poppy was inbred 4 × 4 to Northern Dancer, meaning that this stallion appears twice in the fourth generation of her pedigree.
