= Agnes Flora =

Japanese Thoroughbred racehorse

Agnes Flora アグネスフローラ
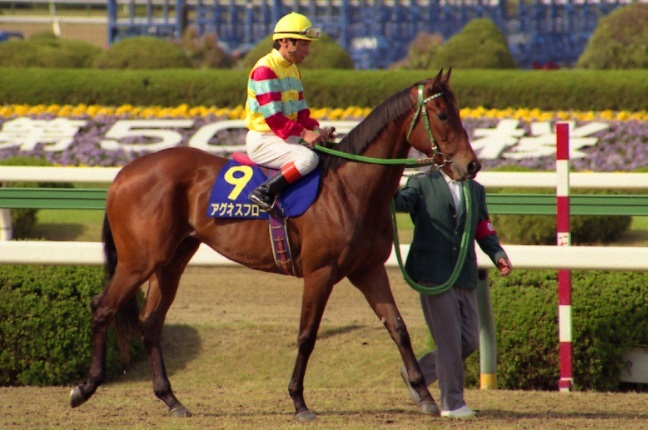
- Agnes Flora at the Oka Sho
- Breed: Thoroughbred
- Sire: Royal Ski
- Grandsire: Raja Baba
- Dam: Agnes Lady
- Damsire: Remand
- Sex: Mare
- Foaled: June 18, 1987
- Died: August 8, 2005 (aged 18)
- Country: Japan
- Color: Bay
- Breeder: Masayoshi Orite
- Owner: Takao Watanabe
- Racing colors
- Trainer: Hiroyuki Nagahama
- Jockey: Hiroshi Kawachi
- Record: 6: 5-1-0
- Earnings: ¥160,484,400

Major wins
- Tulip Sho (1990); Japanese Classic TiaraRace wins: Oka Sho (1990)

Awards
- 1990 JRA Award for Best Three-Year-Old Filly

Agnes Flora (Japanese: アグネスフローラ, Hepburn: Agunesu Furōra; born June 18, 1987, died August 8, 2005) was a Japanese racehorse known for winning the Grade 1 Oka Sho in 1990. She is also known as the dam of Agnes Flight and Agnes Tachyon, the former a Derby winner and the latter the Leading Sire of Japan in 2008.

She was most prominently known for her win at the Oka Sho in 1990. She also won the Tulip Sho and Elfin Stakes in Japan. At the end of the year, Agnes Flora won the JRA Award for Best Three-Year-Old Filly.

== Background ==
Born in 1987 at Orite farm in Mitsuishi, Hokkaido, Agnes Flora was the sixth foal of Agnes Lady. Her Sire, Royal Sky, was a stallion who had produced numerous offspring proficient at sprint to mile length races, and the mating was intended to avenge the dam's defeat in the Oka Sho (Japanese 1,000 Guineas), in which she had finished sixth. Farm manager Masayoshi Orite later remarked of the filly in her early years, "Among all of Agnes Lady's foals up to that point, she was certainly the best-made horse. She had a supple frame and plenty of width, and there was nothing to fault about her."

== Racing career ==
=== 1989: Three-year-old season ===
Upon reaching the racing age of three in 1989, she was entered into the stable of Hiroyuki Nagahama, who had previously trained her dam. She was assigned the same head groom, Tetsuo Okawa, and the jockey who rode her in training, Hiroshi Kawauchi. Kawauchi held the filly's potential in extremely high regard and declared to those around him, "I'll win the newcomer race by nine lengths on this horse." In her debut race at Hanshin Racecourse on December 9, she was the second favorite, but won by a ten-length margin over the runner-up. At this point, Nagahama and Kawauchi begun to formulate a schedule targeting the Oka Shō.

=== 1990: Four-year-old season ===
Agnes Flora begun her 1990 campaign on January 15, winning an allowance race by three lengths. She experienced her first race on heavy terrain shortly thereafter; on February 4, she contested the Elfin Stakes. Despite struggling to navigate on the corners, she rallied from a good position and surged to victory on the final stretch.

In the Tulip Sho, a preparatory race for the Oka Sho, she was granted sole-entry designation and easily overtook the front-running Kerry Bag before the finish to achieve her fourth consecutive victory.

On April 8, in the Oka Sho, she was voted as the favorite to win. The race saw several horses contesting the lead, resulting in a fast pace—the first 800 meters were covered in 45.9 seconds, despite the softened track—while Kawauchi positioned Agnes Flora around eighth place in the midfield. At the final turn, the front-running pace-setting horses began to tire-out, while Sweet Mituna, who had bumped heels with a horse ahead, and Legacy Wise, who suffered an injury, caused their jockeys to fall; several horses, including Agnes Flora, were forced to maneuver to the outside. On the final straight, Kerry Bag took the lead, but Flora, having regained her composure, closed in from the outside to catch her at the 200-meter mark, winning by one-and-a-fourth lengths.

Owner Toshio Watanabe, with tears in his eyes, remarked in a post-ceremony interview, "Eleven years was a long time." The victory allowed Watanabe to achieve the "Fillies' Triple Crown" as an owner, complementing Agnes Tesco's victory in the Queen Elizabeth II Cup, and Agnes Lady's win in the Japanese Oaks. It also marked Kawauchi's third Oka Sho victory, a record at the time.

After the race, Kawauchi praised Flora, referring to the incident at the final corner: "She veered to the outside and was shaken a bit, but she recovered remarkably well. She is a truly gutsy horse."

Next, aiming for the Fillies' Classic Double and a second consecutive dam-offspring Classic triumph, following the precedent of Kurifuji and Yamaichi, she proceeded to the Yushun Himba. Despite concerns regarding the 2400-meter distance stemming from her sire's pedigree, she was voted the favorite on race day. Towa Ruby set a strong early pace, with a 58.6-second split for the first 1000 meters, once again leading to a fast tempo as in the Oka Sho. Agnes Flora again positioned herself in the midfield before advancing on the leaders from the final turn into the straight. In the final straight, she overtook Kerry Bag and took the lead, as she had in the Oka Sho; however, she was outrun in the last 100 meters by Eishin Sunny, who had been reserved at the rear, and finished second by a ¾-length margin.

Following the race, a fracture was discovered in her left foreleg, and she was sent for rest. The fracture was minor, and she was being prepared for a fall campaign aimed at the Queen Elizabeth II Cup; however, during that recovery period, she developed tendinitis in her superficial flexor tendon. She was unable to return to training, and was retired from racing.

== Racing form ==
Agnes Flora won five out of six starts in her career. This data available is based on JBIS and netkeiba.

Date	Track	Race	Grade	Distance (Condition)	Entry	HN	Odds (Favored)	Finish	Time	Margins	Jockey	Winner (Runner-up)
1989 – two-year-old season
Dec 9	Hanshin	2yo Newcomer		1,200 m (Firm)	8	4	2.5 (2)	1st	1:10.1	–1.6	Hiroshi Kawachi	(Lead Classic)
1990 – three-year-old season
Jan 15	Kyoto	Wakana Sho	ALW (1W)	1,400 m (Firm)	14	7	2.0 (1)	1st	1:23.3	–0.5	Hiroshi Kawachi	(Golden Hour)
Feb 4	Hanshin	Elfin Stakes	OP	1,600 m (Heavy)	10	6	2.3 (1)	1st	1:37.0	–0.1	Hiroshi Kawachi	(Coniston)
Mar 11	Hanshin	Tulip Sho	OP	1,600 m (Firm)	10	5	1.6 (1)	1st	1:36.4	–0.2	Hiroshi Kawachi	(Kelly Bag)
Apr 8	Hanshin	Oka Sho	1	1,600 m (Soft)	18	9	2.2 (1)	1st	1:37.1	–0.2	Hiroshi Kawachi	(Kelly Bag)
May 20	Tokyo	Yushun Himba	1	2,400 m (Firm)	20	20	2.5 (1)	2nd	2:26.1	0.1	Hiroshi Kawachi	Eishin Sunny

Legend:
Turf

== Broodmare career and death ==
In retirement, Agnes Flora was a strong broodmare, producing the 2000 Tokyo Yushun winner Agnes Flight and the 2001 Satsuki Sho winner Agnes Tachyon, the latter of whom became a prominent sire who sired the Arima Kinen winner Daiwa Scarlet and the dual Grade 1 winner (Tokyo Yushun, NHK Mile Cup) Deep Sky.

Agnes Flora died on August 8, 2005 from laminitis.

== Pedigree ==
Pedigree of Agnes Flora
Sire Royal Ski 1974	Raja Baba 1968	Bold Ruler	Nasrullah
Sire Royal Ski 1974	Raja Baba 1968	Bold Ruler	Miss Disco
Sire Royal Ski 1974	Raja Baba 1968	Missy Baba	My Babu
Sire Royal Ski 1974	Raja Baba 1968	Missy Baba	Uvira
Sire Royal Ski 1974	Coz Onijinsky 1969	Involvement	Intent
Sire Royal Ski 1974	Coz Onijinsky 1969	Involvement	Lea Lane
Sire Royal Ski 1974	Coz Onijinsky 1969	Gleam	Tournoi
Sire Royal Ski 1974	Coz Onijinsky 1969	Gleam	Flaring Top
Dam Agnes Lady 1976 (FNo: 1-l)	Remand 1965	Alcide	Alycidon
Dam Agnes Lady 1976 (FNo: 1-l)	Remand 1965	Alcide	Chenille
Dam Agnes Lady 1976 (FNo: 1-l)	Remand 1965	Admonish	Palestine
Dam Agnes Lady 1976 (FNo: 1-l)	Remand 1965	Admonish	Warning
Dam Agnes Lady 1976 (FNo: 1-l)	Ikoma Eikan 1967	Sallymount	Tudor Minstrel
Dam Agnes Lady 1976 (FNo: 1-l)	Ikoma Eikan 1967	Sallymount	Queen of Shiraz
Dam Agnes Lady 1976 (FNo: 1-l)	Ikoma Eikan 1967	Heatherlands	Tenerani
Dam Agnes Lady 1976 (FNo: 1-l)	Ikoma Eikan 1967	Heatherlands	Dark Brocane
