= Sweet Solera =

Irish-bred Thoroughbred racehorse

- Sire: Solonaway
- Grandsire: Solferino
- Dam: Miss Gammon
- Damsire: Grandmaster
- Sex: Mare
- Foaled: 1958
- Country: Ireland
- Colour: Chestnut
- Breeder: Mrs D. M. Walker
- Owner: Mrs Magnus Castello
- Trainer: Reginald Day
- Record: 8: 6-1-1
- Earnings: £40,165

Major wins
- Cherry Hinton Stakes (1960); 1,000 Guineas Trial Stakes (1961); Thirsk Classic Trial (1961); 1000 Guineas (1961); Epsom Oaks (1961)

Honours
- Timeform top-rated European three-year-old filly (1961); Timeform rating: 129; Sweet Solera Stakes at Newmarket

Sweet Solera (1958–1978) was an Irish-bred, British-trained Thoroughbred racehorse. In a racing career lasting from June 1960 until June 1961, the unfashionably-bred filly ran eight times and won six races. As a two-year-old she was beaten in her first two races, but her five-lengths win in the Cherry Hinton Stakes at Newmarket Racecourse was enough to see her rated among the best juveniles of the year. Sweet Solera was unbeaten in four races including the 1000 Guineas at Newmarket and Oaks at Epsom. She was then retired to stud, and had some success as a broodmare.

== Background ==
Sweet Solera was a "big, handsome" chestnut filly with a broad white blaze and a long white sock on her left hind leg, bred in Ireland by Mrs D. M Walker. Her sire, Solonaway won the Irish 2,000 Guineas over a mile, but was better known as a sprinter. In the year of Sweet Solera's birth he was exported to Japan, where he became Champion sire in 1966. Her dam, Miss Gammon, won three minor races and was a half-sister of Royal Rasher, who won the Del Mar Oaks in 1957. She was a member of Thoroughbred Family 11-f which also produced Colombo, Aunt Edith and Meadow Court. An unusual feature of Sweet Solera's pedigree was the presence in the fourth generation of Call Boy: the 1927 Epsom Derby winner was almost sterile and sired very few foals.

Sweet Solera's pedigree was not considered an impressive one and when she was sent as a yearling to the October sales at Newmarket she was bought for 1,850 guineas by the trainer Reg Day, acting on behalf of Mrs S. M. Castello. Day, who began training racehorses as a teenager in 1900, prepared the filly for racing at his Terrace House stables at Newmarket, Suffolk.

== Racing career ==
Sweet Solera's two-year-old season lasted less than two months. She began her racing career at Kempton Park in June 1960 when she finished second in the Rivermead Stakes. Later that month she was moved up in class to contest the Queen Mary Stakes at Royal Ascot and finished third behind Cynara. In July Sweet Solera recorded her first success when she won the Princess Stakes at Newmarket, beating Ambergris by three lengths. The runner-up subsequently boosted the form when she defeated colts in the Champagne Stakes at Doncaster. In the Cherry Hinton Stakes at the same course she was an impressive winner, beating Palatina by five lengths. Sweet Solera was being prepared for a run in the Cheveley Park Stakes in October when she contracted a respiratory infection which brought an end to her season. At the end of the year she was given a weight of 128 pounds, the fifth highest in the Free Handicap, a rating of the season's best two-year-olds. The top weight of 133 pounds was given to the French-trained filly Opaline, who had won the Cheveley Park Stakes in Sweet Solera's absence.

On her three-year-old debut, Sweet Solera won the 1000 Guineas Trial Stakes at Kempton Park on 3 April, beating Who Can Tell, who subsequently won the Fred Darling Stakes. Twelve days later, she was then tried against colts for the first and only time in the Thirsk Classic Trial over one mile at Thirsk Racecourse. She won by three-quarters of a length from the colt Henry The Seventh, but appeared fortunate not to be disqualified, having hampered the runner-up in the closing stages. Henry the Seventh went on to win several major races including the Eclipse Stakes. In the 1000 Guineas over the Rowley Mile at Newmarket, Sweet Solera was ridden by Bill Rickaby and started the 4/1 joint favourite with Mystify in a field of fourteen fillies. She won by one and a half lengths from Ambergris with a gap of six lengths back to Indian Melody in third. The time of 1:38.14 was over a second faster than that recorded by the colt Rockavon in the previous day's 2000 Guineas. Despite doubts about her stamina over the one and a half mile distance, Sweet Solera started 11/4 favourite for the Oaks at Epsom a month later. The race saw a duplication of the Newmarket form, with Sweet Solera beating Ambergris by one and a half lengths. Sweet Solera never raced again.

== Retirement ==
The best of Sweet Solera's offspring was Bon Appetit, a filly sired by Major Portion, who won the Prix Vanteaux in 1970. Bon Appetit's daughter Batave, a Group-placed sprinter, produced the colt Bigstone, whose wins included the Sussex Stakes and the Queen Elizabeth II Stakes. Sweet Solera died in 1978.

== Assessment and honours ==
Sweet Solera was given a Timeform rating of 129 in 1960 and 127 in 1961, when she was the highest rated three-year-old filly in Europe.

In their book, A Century of Champions, based on the Timeform rating system, John Randall and Tony Morris rated Sweet Solera an "average" winner of the 1000 Guineas and Oaks.

The Group Three Sweet Solera Stakes for two-year-old fillies is run at Newmarket in August.

== Pedigree ==
Pedigree of Sweet Solera (IRE), chestnut mare, 1958
Sire Solonaway (GB) 1946	Solferino; 1940	Fairway	Phalaris
Sire Solonaway (GB) 1946	Solferino; 1940	Fairway	Scapa Flow
Sire Solonaway (GB) 1946	Solferino; 1940	Sol Speranza	Ballyferis
Sire Solonaway (GB) 1946	Solferino; 1940	Sol Speranza	Sunbridge
Sire Solonaway (GB) 1946	Anyway; 1935	Grand Glacier	Grand Parade
Sire Solonaway (GB) 1946	Anyway; 1935	Grand Glacier	Glaspia
Sire Solonaway (GB) 1946	Anyway; 1935	The Widow Murphy	Pomme-de-Terre
Sire Solonaway (GB) 1946	Anyway; 1935	The Widow Murphy	Waterwitch
Dam Miss Gammon (GB) 1947	Grandmaster; 1942	Atout Maitre	Vatout
Dam Miss Gammon (GB) 1947	Grandmaster; 1942	Atout Maitre	Royal Mistress
Dam Miss Gammon (GB) 1947	Grandmaster; 1942	Homorarium	Colorado Kid
Dam Miss Gammon (GB) 1947	Grandmaster; 1942	Homorarium	Emolument
Dam Miss Gammon (GB) 1947	Rasher; 1942	His Grace	Blandford
Dam Miss Gammon (GB) 1947	Rasher; 1942	His Grace	Malva
Dam Miss Gammon (GB) 1947	Rasher; 1942	Bacona	Call Boy
Dam Miss Gammon (GB) 1947	Rasher; 1942	Bacona	Etona (Family 11-f)
