= Agnes Flight =

Japanese Thoroughbred racehorse

Agnes Flight アグネスフライト
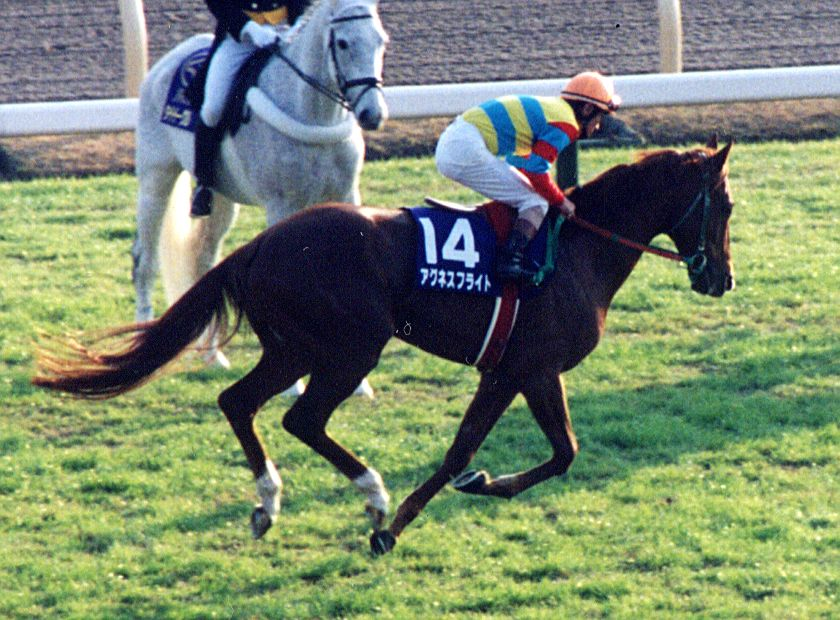
- Tokyo Racecourse (26 November 2000)
- Breed: Thoroughbred
- Sire: Sunday Silence
- Grandsire: Halo
- Dam: Agnes Flora
- Damsire: Royal Ski
- Sex: Stallion
- Foaled: March 2, 1997
- Died: January 11, 2023 (aged 25)
- Country: Japan
- Colour: Chestnut
- Breeder: Shadai Farm
- Owner: Takao Watanabe
- Racing colours
- Trainer: Hiroyuki Nagahama
- Jockey: Hiroshi Kawachi
- Record: 14: 4-2-0
- Earnings: ¥299,193,000

Major wins
- Kyoto Shimbun Hai (2000); Japanese Classic Race wins: Tokyo Yushun (2000)

Agnes Flight (Japanese: アグネスフライト, Hepburn: Agunesu Furaito; 2 March 1997 – 11 January 2023) was a Japanese Thoroughbred racehorse. He was sired by Sunday Silence covering Agnes Flora, and is therefore a full-brother to Agnes Tachyon.

== Racing career ==
As a three-year-old, Agnes Flight, ridden by Hiroshi Kawachi, started the campaign by winning his debut race. He got his second career win at the Wakakusa Stakes after placing in 12th-place on his second race which was the Wakaba Stakes. After three races, he sat tight on 19th in the Tokyo Yushun's qualifying roster. In order to be able to jump up the standings, he need to at least placed in top two at the Kyoto Shimbun Hai. In the race, he started late and fell behind the pack but he pulled out a finishing sprint from the third corner on the outside to win the race by three lengths ahead. This result qualified him for the Tokyo Yushun. At the race, he started at the back on 18th position, marking Air Shakur, the Satsuki Sho winner on the 14th place. At the third corner, Air Shakur started to break out and Agnes Flight tailed him when he moved. In seemingly good gap at the final straight, Air Shakur seemingly slowed down at the final stretch. This opened an opportunity for Agnes Flight to chase him down to the wire and he succeeded. He won the Tokyo Yushun (Japanese Derby) by a nose in the end. In the photo finish, it was decided that those two horses were only 7 cm apart at the line. This win marked an occasion where three horses in three separate linear generation won a classic as his grand dam (Agnes Lady) and his dam (Agnes Flora) won the Yushun Himba and Oka Sho in 1979 and 1990 respectively. He continued that momentum by finishing in second place at the Kobe Shimbun Hai. He closed the season with a fifth place in the Kikuka Sho, where Air Shakur won the race and sealed the double crown, and a 13th-place finish in the Japan Cup, 1.5 seconds behind T M Opera O.

During his four-year-old season, Agnes Flight came second in the Kyōto Kinen as his best finishes. At the next race in the Sankei Osaka Hai where he finished tenth, he started to develop tendonitis on his legs and was forced to withdraw from racing and take a long break. He returned on the next year Tenno Sho (Autumn) and another Japan Cup where his finished down in 15th and 16th place respectively. He continued racing in 2003, where he finished in sixth at the Kyoto Kinen. His final race of his career meant to be at the Hanshin Daishoten in which he placed 13th. On May 10th 2003, a retirement ceremony was held at Kyoto Racecourse, the venue for the Kyoto Shimbun Hai, where Agnes Flight appeared wearing the number 4 jersey worn when he won the Tokyo Yushun. Kawachi, who turned trainer recently, demonstrated his running style on a short straight courses as a tribute that day. Overall, he started 14 times during his career, won four times, and came second twice.

== Racing form ==
Agnes Flight won four races out of 14 starts. This data is available in JBIS and netkeiba.

Date	Racecourse	Race	Grade	Distance (Condition)	Entry	HN	Odds (Favored)	Finish	Time	Margins	Jockey	Winner (Runner-up)
2000 – three-year-old season
Feb 6	Kyoto	2YO Newcomer		1,600 m (Firm)	15	3	6.1 (2)	1st	1:37.1	–0.7	Hiroshi Kawachi	(Southern Suzuka)
Mar 18	Hanshin	Wakaba Stakes	OP	2,000 m (Firm)	16	8	4.6 (2)	12th	2:03.6	1.2	Hiroshi Kawachi	Kurino King O
Apr 15	Hanshin	Wakakusa Stakes	OP	2,200 m (Firm)	12	3	7.4 (3)	1st	2:18.4	–0.1	Hiroshi Kawachi	(Jin Warabeuta)
May 6	Kyoto	Kyoto Shimbun Hai	2	2,000 m (Firm)	14	13	3.4 (2)	1st	1:59.8	–0.5	Hiroshi Kawachi	(Maruka Mirror)
May 28	Tokyo	Tokyo Yushun	1	2,400 m (Firm)	18	4	5.1 (3)	1st	2:26.2	0.0	Hiroshi Kawachi	(Air Shakur)
Sep 24	Hanshin	Kobe Shimbun Hai	2	2,000 m (Firm)	12	11	4.6 (2)	2nd	2:01.9	0.3	Hiroshi Kawachi	Fusaichi Sonic
Oct 22	Kyoto	Kikuka Sho	1	3,000 m (Firm)	18	6	1.9 (1)	5th	3:05.6	0.9	Hiroshi Kawachi	Air Shakur
Nov 26	Tokyo	Japan Cup	1	2,400 m (Firm)	16	14	13.8 (4)	13th	2:27.6	1.5	Hiroshi Kawachi	T M Opera O
2001 – four-year-old season
Feb 17	Kyoto	Kyoto Kinen	2	2,200 m (Firm)	14	14	3.4 (2)	2nd	2:12.4	0.1	Hiroshi Kawachi	Maquereau
Apr 1	Hanshin	Sankei Osaka Hai	2	2,000 m (Firm)	14	5	8.0 (3)	10th	1:59.7	1.3	Hiroshi Kawachi	Toho Dream
2002 – five-year-old season
Oct 27	Nakayama	Tenno Sho (Autumn)	1	2,000 m (Firm)	18	2	88.4 (16)	15th	1:59.8	1.3	Masaki Katsuura	Symboli Kris S
Nov 24	Nakayama	Japan Cup	1	2,200 m (Firm)	16	6	76.9 (15)	16th	2:14.7	2.5	Hiroki Goto	Falbrav
2003 – six-year-old season
Feb 22	Kyoto	Kyoto Kinen	2	2,200 m (Good)	16	8	10.5 (5)	6th	2:16.8	0.3	Hiroshi Kawachi	My Sole Sound
Mar 23	Hanshin	Hanshin Daishoten	2	3,000 m (Firm)	15	6	34.3 (10)	13th	3:07.2	1.3	Mikio Matsunaga	Daitaku Bertram

Legend:
Turf

== Later life ==
In 2004, Agnes Flight was sent to stand at stud at Hidaka Stallion Station. He stood there until 2011. He later became a training horse for new recruits at the Shadai Farm before being pensioned at the Shadai Blue Grass Farm in 2015. Agnes Flight was euthanized on 11 January 2023 after being unable to stand despite efforts, due to his age.

== Pedigree ==
Pedigree of Agnes Flight (JPN), chestnut stallion, 1997
Sire Sunday Silence (USA) 1986	Halo (USA); 1969	Hail to Reason; 1958	Turn-to
Sire Sunday Silence (USA) 1986	Halo (USA); 1969	Hail to Reason; 1958	Nothirdchance
Sire Sunday Silence (USA) 1986	Halo (USA); 1969	Cosmah; 1953	Cosmic Bomb
Sire Sunday Silence (USA) 1986	Halo (USA); 1969	Cosmah; 1953	Almahmoud
Sire Sunday Silence (USA) 1986	Wishing Well; 1975	Understanding; 1963	Promised Land
Sire Sunday Silence (USA) 1986	Wishing Well; 1975	Understanding; 1963	Pretty Ways
Sire Sunday Silence (USA) 1986	Wishing Well; 1975	Mountain Flower; 1964	Montparnasse
Sire Sunday Silence (USA) 1986	Wishing Well; 1975	Mountain Flower; 1964	Edelweiss
Dam Agnes Flora (JPN) 1987	Royal Ski; 1974	Raja Baba	Bold Ruler
Dam Agnes Flora (JPN) 1987	Royal Ski; 1974	Raja Baba	Missy Baba
Dam Agnes Flora (JPN) 1987	Royal Ski; 1974	Coz o'Nijinsky; 1969	Involvement
Dam Agnes Flora (JPN) 1987	Royal Ski; 1974	Coz o'Nijinsky; 1969	Gleam
Dam Agnes Flora (JPN) 1987	Agnes Lady (JPN); 1976	Remand; 1965	Alcide
Dam Agnes Flora (JPN) 1987	Agnes Lady (JPN); 1976	Remand; 1965	Admonish
Dam Agnes Flora (JPN) 1987	Agnes Lady (JPN); 1976	Ikoma Eikan (JPN)	Sallymount
Dam Agnes Flora (JPN) 1987	Agnes Lady (JPN); 1976	Ikoma Eikan (JPN)	Heatherlands (GB) (Family: 1-l)
