= Kenichi Ikezoe =

Japanese horse jockey (born 1979)

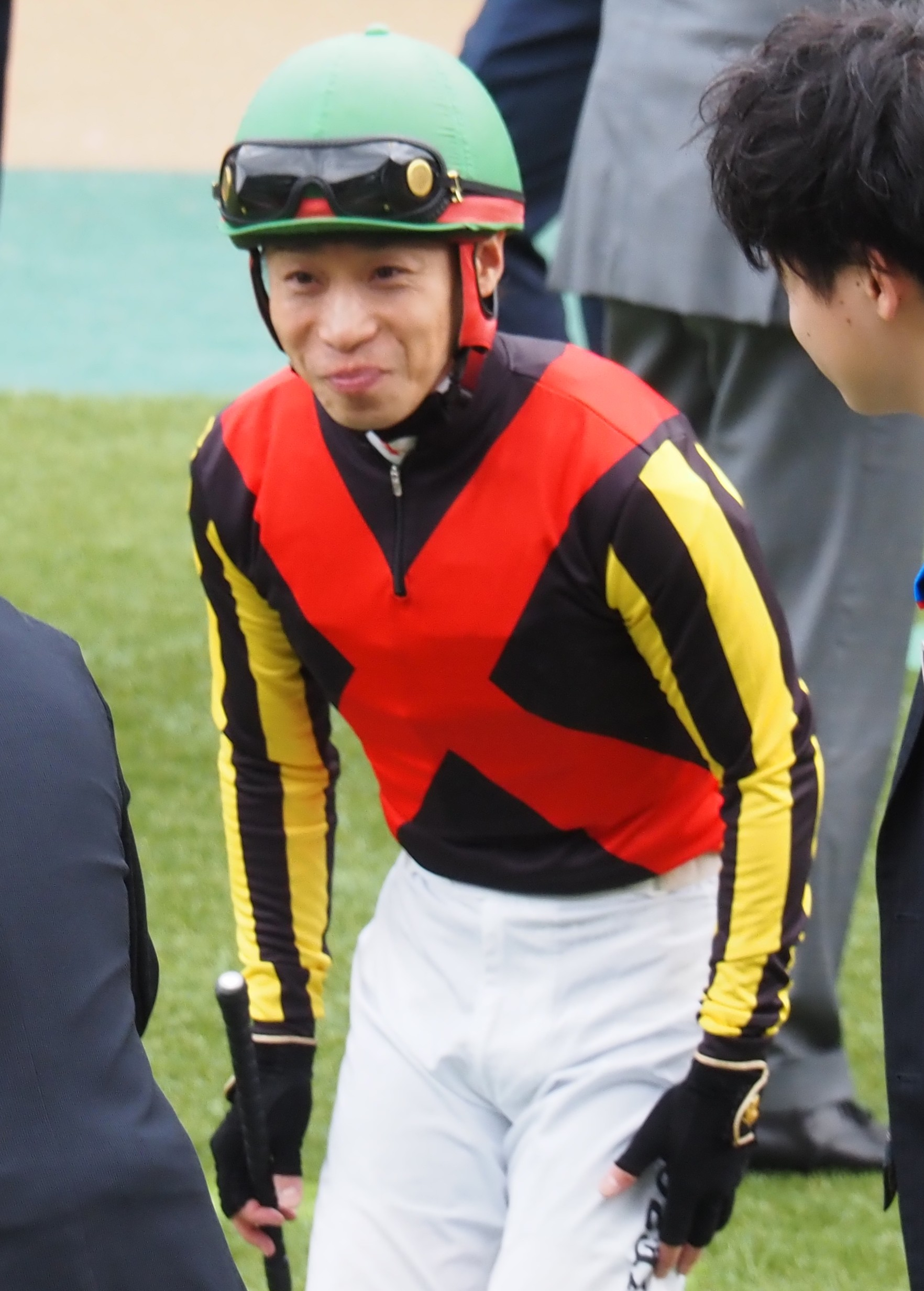
- Ikezoe at the 2025 Tokyo Yushun

Personal information
- Native name: 池添謙一
- Nationality: Japanese
- Born: 23 July 1979 (age 47) Shiga Prefecture
- Occupation: Jockey
- Height: 162 cm (5 ft 4 in)
- Weight: 50.0 kg (110 lb)

Horse racing career
- Sport: Horse racing
- Career wins: 1349 (JRA); 20 (NAR)

Significant horses
- Arrow Carry, Durandal, Sweep Tosho, Dream Journey, Tall Poppy, Curren Chan, Orfevre, Eishin Apollon, Shonan Pandora, Sinhalite, Blast Onepiece

Kenichi Ikezoe (Japanese: 池添謙一, romanized: ikezoe ken'ichi, born July 23, 1979) is a Japanese jockey affiliated with the Ritto Training Center of the Japan Racing Association. Dubbed "The Grand Prix Man (of the Heisei era)", Kenichi is the older brother of horse trainer Manabu Ikezoe, and has won the Arima and Takarazuka Kinen, the two races considered to be the Grand Prix races in Japanese horse racing, 7 times in total.

== Profile ==
Ikezoe enrolled in the Horse Racing School after wanting to be like Yutaka Take. He made his jockey debut on the 2nd race held at Hanshin on March 1, 1998; where he rode Natural Color and came in 6th out of 12 horses. On the 14th of that same month, Ikezoe won his first race with Tayasu Social at Chukyo. Later that year, Ikezoe won his first graded race at the Kitakyushu Kinen, which was held at Hanshin that year due to the usual Kokura Racecourse going through renovations. Ikezoe won 38 races that year, earning him the JRA Award for Best Jockey (newcomer).

Ikezoe rode his first race abroad on July 13, 2001, at the Deauville-La Touques Racecourse with Hathaari. Originally, Take was supposed to ride the horse, but because he had injured himself in the race prior, Ikezoe was chosen as a last-minute replacement. As he was not prepared to ride any horses that day, he had to borrow Take and Olivier Peslier's horse gear for the race. Ikezoe worked on the stable and horse training from the day after.

Ikezoe won his first Grade 1 race on April 7, 2002, when he rode Arrow Carry at that year's Oka Sho. That year, he was invited by Mirco Demuro to race in the Italian 1,000 Guineas. His horse was the 18th most favored to win out of the 20 entrants, but managed to come in second place behind Demuro.

In 2003, Ikezoe won the Sprinters Stakes and Mile Championship with Durandal, and the following year won the Mile Championship once again with the same horse. That same year, Ikezoe won the Shuka Sho with Sweep Tosho. The horse would go on to also win the Takarazuka Kinen and the Queen Elizabeth II Cup in 2005.

On September 9, 2007, Ikezoe became the 73rd jockey ever to win a total of 500 JRA races. He would also win the Hanshin Juvenile Fillies that same year with Tall Poppy.

On May 25, 2008, Ikezoe and Tall Poppy won the Yushun Himba, winning his 9th Grade 1 race. However, he was issued a 2-day suspension as the horse had suddenly veered towards the inside on the final stretch, which was deemed a dangerous riding by the judges. Ikezoe himself seemed to be aware that he interfered with the other horse, as during the winner interview, he said that he "gave the other horses unnecessary trouble".

On June 28, 2009, Ikezoe won the Takarazuka Kinen with Dream Journey. Later that year, the two would go on to also win the Arima Kinen.

On April 24, 2011, Ikezoe won his first Triple Crown race as he won the Satsuki Sho with Orfevre. One month later, the two won the second leg of the Triple Crown, the Japanese Derby, making Ikezoe a Derby jockey after 7 attempts in his 14 year long career. On October 2, Ikezoe won the Sprinters Stakes with Curren Chan, leading the filly to her first Grade 1 victory after 3 consecutive graded race victories. On that same day, Ikezoe became leading jockey of Sapporo Racecourse for the season as the racecourse finished all of its scheduled races with Ikezoe having the most victories at 18. On October 23, Ikezoe became a Triple Crown jockey as the two won the Kikuka Sho, making Orfevre the 7th Triple Crown horse ever. This victory also made Ikezoe the youngest jockey ever at just 32 years old, although there was a moment after the race where the horse veered off to the outer railings and shook Ikezoe off. This victory made Ikezoe the 6th person ever to win all 5 of the Classic races in Japan. On November 20 of that same year, Ikezoe became Eishin Apollon's replacement jockey for the Mile Championship after the horse's regular jockey, Hironobu Tanabe, was suspended on unrelated matters. This was the first time Ikezoe rode the horse since the Satsuki Sho from a year before, but they were able to pace well in a good position and finished first. On December 25, Orfevre and Ikezoe won the Arima Kinen after earning the 2nd most fan votes and being the most favored to win, making it the first time since Narita Brian to win 4 Grade 1 races as a 3 year old. Ikezoe ended the season with 6 Grade 1 wins out of a 14 graded race victory, ending the year on a high note.

From January 5 to 6, Ikezoe entered the Meydan Masters International Jockey Championship that was held at Meydan Racecourse in Dubai. On his second race, the third race of the sixth, he rode and won with Street Act, marking his first win of the year with his first ever victory abroad. On March 25 of that same year, he and Curren Chan won the Takamatsunomiya Kinen after taking the lead early on and leading the pack for the rest of the race. On June 24 of that same year, Orfevre and Ikezoe won their 5th Grade 1 race after winning the Takarazuka Kinen.

In early 2013, Ikezoe announced that he would travel to France from April to June of that year in order to be offered to ride Orfevre in France for that year's Prix de l'Arc de Triomphe. However, he came back to Japan earlier than planned after it was announced that Christophe Soumillon would ride Orfevre, just like he did in the year before. He would, however, ride Orfevre in the Arima Kinen of that year, which was announced to be his final race. Orfevre would win the race with an 8 length lead as 120,000 fans came to watch his final race.

Ikezoe did not win a single graded race in 2014, ending his 14 year long streak of winning at least one graded race. He rode Curren Mirotic for that year's Hong Kong Vase, but finished in 5th place.

On March 7, 2015, Ikezoe became the 29th jockey to enter in a total of 10,000 races with him riding Culminar for that day's Tulip Sho. Later that year, on November 29, he rode Shonan Pandora in the Japan Cup. The horse started from gate 15 like his previous race which had him finish in 4th place, but was able to come out of the pack on the final stretch, and after going neck and neck against two other entrants, he and the horse was able to win the Japan Cup by a neck.

Ikezoe won the Yushun Himba for the second time in 2016 with Sinhalite. On July 24, Ikezoe became the leading jockey of the season for Hakodate Racecourse, after winning a total of 13 races out of all the races held that season. On August 6, Ikezoe entered the Shergar Cup held at Ascot as a member of the Rest of the World Team. While he was unable to win in a race, he was able to score points in 3 out of the 5 races he entered; placing himself 3rd highest and contributed to the team's victory that season。Ikezoe won his 1,000th JRA race on December 4 of that year after winning the Tanzanite Stakes with Sunrise Major.。

On April 9, 2017, Ikezoe won the Oka Sho for the first time in 15 years with Reine Minoru after taking the lead and staying in the lead for the rest of the race.

Starting from early 2018, Ikezoe moved his training base from Ritto to Miho. On December 23 of that year, he entered the Arima Kinen with Blast Onepiece, and after placing himself in the outer area of the pack, he took the lead on the final stretch and won the race by a neck, becoming the jockey with the most Arima wins, and also the first time he won a Grade 1 race with a horse based in Miho Training Center.

On November 17, 2019, Ikezoe substituted Yuichi Fukunaga, who was given a suspension, as jockey for Indy Champ for the Mile Championship. Ikezoe placed the horse in 5th of the pack during the race, and after entering the final stretch he managed to align the horse with another horse on the outside, and then widened the gap in the last furlong, winning him the fourth win of that race.

On June 7, 2020, he entered the Yasuda Kinen with Gran Alegria. At around the 3rd corner a chunk of turf was kicked up by another horse in front of him and hit near his right eye, nearly causing a concussion. In spite of the accident, he was able to win the race for the first time. Ikezoe then became the 6th jockey ever to win at least one graded race of all 10 JRA racecourses after winning the Fukushima Kinen with Bio Spark.

On March 21, 2021, Ikezoe won the Spring Stakes with Victipharus. Because the horse was trained by his brother, Manabu, this race marked the first time that a trainer/jockey sibling won a graded race together.

On June 5, 2022, he won the Yasuda Kinen for a second time in his career with Songline. On November 26, the horse he was riding at the 7th race of the Hanshin Racecourse tripped, causing him to fall off the horse. He was diagnosed to have a bruise on his lower back, causing him to cancel all his races for the day and the next. Later on it was revealed that he had broken his bone.

== Personal life ==
Ikezoe's father, Kaneo, was also a JRA jockey and horse trainer. When he was a jockey, he was mainly racing in steeplechase races, and was one of the more prominent jockeys as he had won graded races there too.

Ikezoe's brother, Manabu, is also a horse trainer. Their sister is Ikezoe's valet. In November 2008, Ikezoe married tarento Akari Hori.

== Major wins ==
Japan

- Arima Kinen - (4) - Dream Journey (2009), Orfevre (2011, 2013), Blast Onepiece (2018)
- Hanshin Juvenile Fillies - (1) - Tall Poppy (2007)
- Japan Cup - (1) - Shonan Pandora (2015)
- Oka Sho - (1) - Reine Minoru (2017)
- Kikuka Sho - (1) - Orfevre (2011)
- Mile Championship - (4) - Durandal (2003, 2004), Eishin Apollon (2011), Indy Champ (2019)
- Queen Elizabeth II Cup - (1) - Sweep Tosho (2005)
- Satsuki Sho - (1) - Orfevre (2011)
- Shuka Sho - (1) - Sweep Tosho (2004)
- Sprinters Stakes - (2) - Durandal (2003), Curren Chan (2011)
- Takarazuka Kinen (3) - Sweep Tosho (2005), Dream Journey (2009), Orfevre (2012)
- Tokyo Yushun - (1) - Orfevre (2011)
- Yasuda Kinen - (2) - Gran Alegria (2020), Songline (2022)
- Yushun Himba - (2) - Tall Poppy (2008), Sinhalite (2016)
- Zen-Nippon Nisai Yushun - (1) - Pride Kim (2004)
