= Aston Machan =

Japanese racehorse (2004–2008)

Aston Machan アストンマーチャン
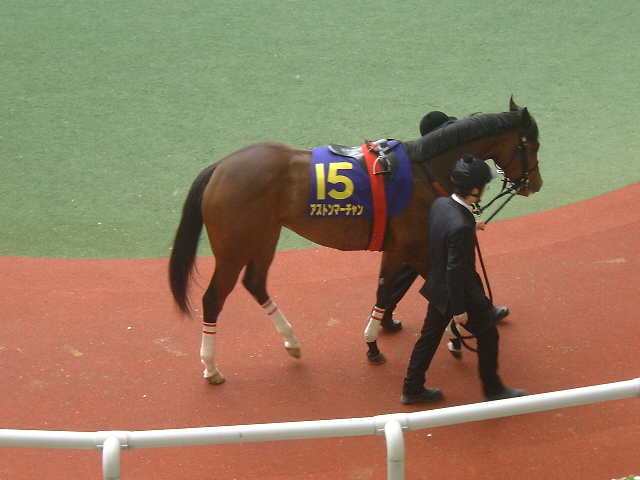
- Aston Machan at the parade ring of the 2007 Oka Shō.
- Breed: Thoroughbred
- Sire: Admire Cozzene (JPN)
- Grandsire: Cozzene (USA)
- Dam: Rustling Copse (USA)
- Damsire: Woodman (USA)
- Sex: Mare
- Foaled: March 5, 2004
- Died: April 21, 2008 (aged 4)
- Country: Japan
- Color: Bay
- Breeder: Shadai Farm
- Owner: Mayumi Tosa
- Racing colors
- Trainer: Sei Ishizaka
- Jockey: Eiji Nakadate; Yutaka Take
- Record: 11: 5-2-0
- Earnings: ¥248,997,000

Major wins
- Kokura Nisai Stakes (2006); Fantasy Stakes (2006); Fillies' Revue (2007); Sprinters Stakes (2007)

Aston Machan (Japanese: アストンマーチャン, Hepburn: Asuton Maachan; 5 March 2004 – 21 April 2008) was a Japanese Thoroughbred racehorse and multiple graded stakes winner. Owned by Mayumi Tosa and trained primarily by Sei Ishizaka, Aston Machan partook mostly in sprint-length races, and competed against leading racehorses such as Daiwa Scarlet and Vodka. In the 2007 Sprinters Stakes, she led from start to finish against older horses to claim her only Group 1 title, becoming only the second 3-year-old filly after Nishino Flower in 1992 to win the race since the JRA's introduction of the grading system. Aston Machan's career was cut short in the spring of her four-year-old season, when she contracted Colitis-X from unknown causes and died prematurely from acute heart failure.

== Background ==
Aston Machan was foaled on Shadai Farm on 5 March 2004. She was sired by Admire Cozzene who was sired by Cozzene, an American-bred racehorse who won the Breeders' Cup Mile in 1985 and was an outstanding sire. Her dam, Rustling Copse, was an American-bred racehorse sired by Woodman.

As Aston Machan was a first-year foal by Admire Cozzene, there was a risk that her characteristics would be difficult to assess and she might fail to find a buyer. However, she was bought by Mayumi Tosa, a veterinarian, making her Tosa’s second horse. Tosa was the one to name her, using a combination of the British automobile brand Aston Martin and her nickname from her student days, “Ma-chan.” It was ultimately decided that Sei Ishizaka would train her. She was reportedly a “model student” at the farm and grew up without any major incidents.

== Racing career ==
=== 2006: two-year-old season ===
On 22 July 2006, Aston Machan made her debut in a maiden race at Kokura Racecourse. Ridden by Yutaka Take and starting as the second favorite, she was beaten by a neck by the top favorite, Charman Reine, and finished second. Takahashi attributed the loss to the horse drifting wide, while Ishizaka analyzed the drifting by noting that he was surprised by how the horse appeared on the Turf Vision screen. Also at Kokura, in a maiden race on August 6, Ryuji Wada took over as jockey, and Aston Machan started as the favorite at odds of 1.3. Running in second place, she overtook the pacesetter by half a length to claim her first victory.

In the Kokura Nisai Stakes on September 3, she was ridden by Ryota Samejima and started as the third favorite. Starting from an outside gate, she settled into second place, took the lead entering the final turn, and crossed the finish line first with a two-and-a-half-length lead, securing her first graded stakes victory. This marked the first graded stakes win for both Ryota Samejima in his second year as a jockey, and Admire Cozzenen, in the first year of his offspring’s racing careers.

Due to fatigue from three races at Kokura, Aston Machan was sent to pasture for two months at the Yamamoto Training Center in Yamamoto Town, Miyagi Prefecture. During this time, Ishizaka acknowledged that Aston Machan’s demeanor and appearance had completely changed. She made her comeback in the Fantasy Stakes on November 5. With Take back in the saddle, she went off as the third favourite. Positioned in the middle of the pack, she began to move up from the third turn. She rounded the final turn in third place and entered the home stretch with plenty of momentum. With 200 meters to go, she was neck-and-neck with Excuse, who had closed in, and the front-runner Admire Pluto, but Aston Machan pulled away to run unchallenged. By the time she crossed the finish line, she had opened up a five-length lead over Excuse, who finished second. Her winning time of 1 minute 20.3 seconds broke the Fantasy Stakes record by 0.9 seconds and the JRA 2-year-old record by 0.5 seconds, marking her second consecutive graded stakes victory. Incidentally, it was revealed after the race that she had lost a shoe during the race.

External Video Link
- 2006 Hanshin Juvenile Fillies; Race video from the JRA official YouTube channel

Next, she competed in the Hanshin Juvenile Fillies on December 3 where she was backed as the favorite at 1.6 odds. With the second favorite, Luminous Harbor, at 8.9 odds, Aston Machan was the clear choice for many bettors. She settled into third place on the inside of the track from the start and took the lead in the home stretch. With 200 meters to go, she was running unchallenged with a lead of about three lengths over the field, but Vodka, the fourth favorite, closed in from the outside, and the two crossed the finish line neck and neck. Vodka was declared the winner by a neck while Aston March finished second. After the race, she was sent to pasture.

In the year-end JRA Awards voting, she received 16 out of 289 votes in the JRA Award for Outstanding 2-Year-Old Filly category, but Vodka received 271 votes and was named the JRA Award for Outstanding 2-Year-Old Filly.

=== 2007–2008: three & four-year-old seasons ===
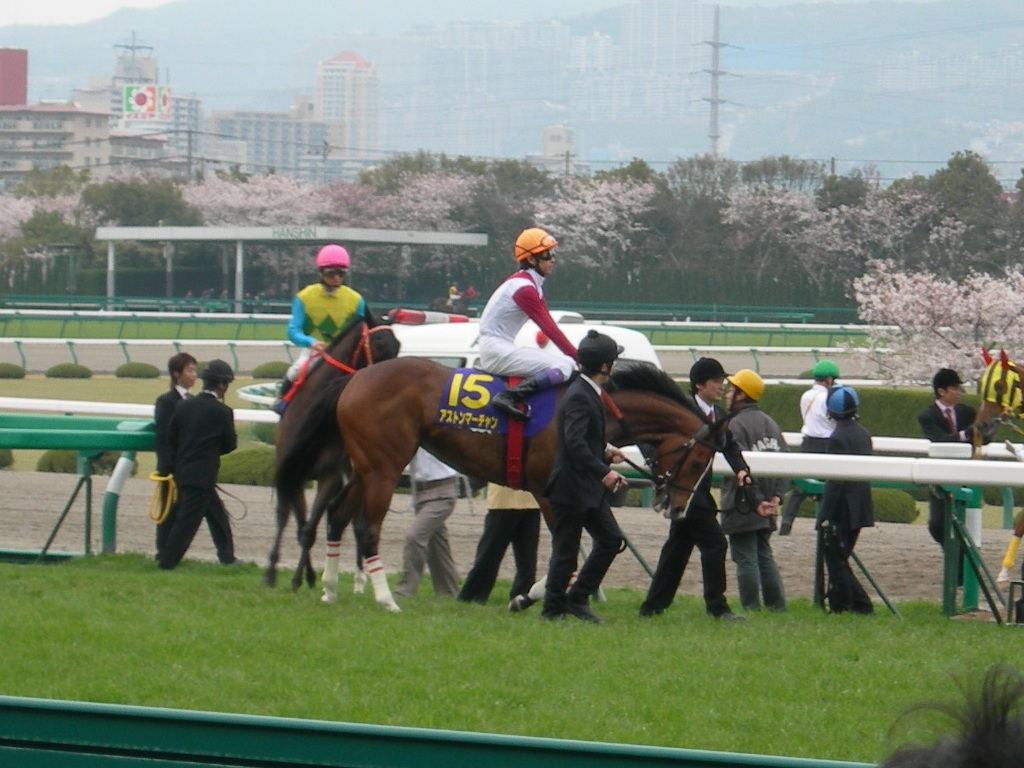
Aston Machan entering the main track for the 2007 Oka Shō.

On 11 March 2007, Aston Machan made her year's debut in the Fillies' Revue, a trial race for the Oka Sho. Since top rivals such as Vodka had moved on to the Tulip Sho, she was favored as the top choice at odds of 1.1. Running in third or fourth place, she broke away down the stretch and won by two and a half lengths. In the subsequent Oka Sho, she started as the second favorite behind Vodka. She moved into second place coming out of the turn but failed to finish strongly, finishing seventh—one second behind the battle between Vodka and the third favorite, Daiwa Scarlet. Take commented, “Because she was tensing her whole body, she wasn’t able to run in her usual form,” while her training assistant, Kazuya Ueda, attributed the defeat to her appetite and physical condition in the days leading up to the race. Subsequently, Ishizaka concluded that the horse was better suited to short distances, set his sights on the fall Sprinters Stakes, and decided to skip the NHK Mile Cup and the Yushun Himba, sending her to Shadai Farm for pasture rest.

As a warm-up for the Sprinters Stakes, Aston Machan was entered in the Kitakyushu Kinen on 12 August. Although it was her first race against older horses, Aston Machan was backed as the 1.8 favorite. Ridden by Yasunari Iwata, she settled into a good position but failed to finish strongly in the home stretch, finishing sixth.

External Video Link
- 2007 Sprinters Stakes; Race video from the JRA official YouTube channel

Aston Machan competed in the Sprinters Stakes on 30 September. In preparation for the race, Ishizaka increased the horse’s hill work from one session per day to two to strengthen her physique and succeeded in increasing Aston Machan’s weight by 10 kilograms from her previous race. Since Takeshi was riding Suzuka Phoenix, the winner of the spring Takamatsunomiya Kinen, Ishizaka selected veteran jockey Eiji Nakadate to ride Aston Machan; Suzuka Phoenix was the second favorite, while Aston Machan was the third favorite.

Believing that she would be unable to fully demonstrate its speed on the heavy track in the rain, Ishizaka instructed Nakadate: “Given this track condition, it doesn’t matter whether you’re on the inside or outside. Even if it doesn’t work out, take the inside route.” True to those instructions, she overtook Lohengrin—who had gotten off to a good start—and took the lead on the inside of the track, setting a pace that put her three lengths ahead of the field. With no challengers closing in from behind, she entered the home stretch in a runaway lead. Although Aston Machan herself did not accelerate, she responded to Nakadate’s left-handed whip and held on tenaciously, crossing the finish line three-quarters of a length ahead of the chasing pack. After crossing the line, Nakadate made a victory gesture with his right hand. This was Aston Marchan’s first GI victory and her fourth graded stakes win. Since the race was elevated to Group I status, she became only the second 3-year-old filly in history to win the race, following Nishino Flower in 1992. For Nakadate, this was his first Group I victory since winning the 1994 Queen Elizabeth II Cup with Hishi Amazon, while for Ishizaka, it was his first Sprinters’ Stakes victory since 2000, when he won with Daitaku Yamato.

In the Swan Stakes on 27 October, she faded in the final stretch and finished 14th. Although she had been provisionally entered in the Hong Kong Sprint, she was withdrawn on 23 October due to equine influenza, which would have required a one-month quarantine period, and was sent to pasture. In 2008, at the age of four, she made her comeback in the Silk Road Stakes on 10 February. With Take back in the saddle, she was the favorite but finished a disappointing 10th. Ishizaka then set his sights on the Takamatsunomiya Kinen.

== Death ==
On 3 March, with the Takamatsunomiya Kinen only one month away, Aston Machan was withdrawn from the race due to poor health. Shortly thereafter, she developed Colitis-X of unknown cause, and was admitted to the Racehorse Clinic at the Ritto Training Center. However, on 21 April 2008, Aston Machan died of acute heart failure with Ishizaka by her side. Ishizaka expressed regret, saying, “[Aston Machan] won the Sprinters Stakes, but her care afterward was poor, and the stress caused her to fall ill."

== In popular culture ==
An anthropomorphized version of Aston Machan appears as a character in the Japanese multimedia franchise Umamusume: Pretty Derby, voiced by Honoka Inoue. She is depicted as the daughter of a doctor who has a habit of photobombing and aims to become the world's most beloved mascot. Due to having spent much of her time around patients who developed memory disorders prior to their deaths, she is accustomed to it but also developed a fear of being forgotten. During her career story, she is promptly forgotten by everyone around her after she wins the Takamatsunomiya Kinen in reference to her real-life counterpart being overshadowed by the likes of Vodka and Daiwa Scarlet after her premature death.

== Racing record ==
Racing exclusively on turf tracks, Aston Machan raced in a total of 11 races, winning 5 and placing 2nd on two races. All results are derived from netkeiba.

Date	Age	Race (Group)	Distance	Track	Finish	Field	Jockey	Winner (Runner-up)
22 Jul 2006	2	2YO debut	1200m	Kokura	2nd	13	Yutaka Take	Charmant Reine
6 Aug 2006	2	2YO maiden	1200m	Kokura	1st	13	Ryuji Wada	(Entrain)
3 Sep 2006	2	Kokura Nisai Stakes (G3)	1200m	Kokura	1st	14	Ryota Sameshima	(Nishino Mao)
5 Nov 2006	2	Fantasy Stakes (G3)	1400m	Kyoto	1st	14	Yutaka Take	(Excuse)
3 Dec 2006	2	Hanshin Juvenile Fillies (G1)	1600m	Hanshin	2nd	18	Yutaka Take	Vodka
11 Mar 2007	3	Fillies' Revue (G2)	1400m	Hanshin	1st	16	Yutaka Take	(Amano Cherry Run)
8 Apr 2007	3	Oka Sho (G1)	1600m	Hanshin	7th	18	Yutaka Take	Daiwa Scarlet
12 Aug 2007	3	Kitakyushu Kinen (G3)	1200m	Kokura	6th	16	Yasunari Iwata	Kyowa Roaring
30 Sep 2007	3	Sprinters Stakes (G1)	1200m	Nakayama	1st	16	Eiji Nakadate	(Sans Adieu)
27 Oct 2007	3	Mainichi Broadcast Swan Stakes (G2)	1400m	Kyoto	14th	18	Eiji Nakadate	Super Hornet
10 Feb 2008	4	Silk Road Stakes (G3)	1200m	Kyoto	10th	16	Yutaka Take	Fine Grain

== Pedigree ==
Pedigree of Aston Machan, bay mare, 2004
Sire Admire Cozzene 1996	Cozzene; 1980	Caro	Fortino
Sire Admire Cozzene 1996	Cozzene; 1980	Caro	Chambord
Sire Admire Cozzene 1996	Cozzene; 1980	Ride The Trails	Prince John
Sire Admire Cozzene 1996	Cozzene; 1980	Ride The Trails	Wildwook
Sire Admire Cozzene 1996	Admire McArdy; 1991	Northern Taste	Northern Dancer
Sire Admire Cozzene 1996	Admire McArdy; 1991	Northern Taste	Lady Victoria
Sire Admire Cozzene 1996	Admire McArdy; 1991	Mrs McArdy	Tribal Chief
Sire Admire Cozzene 1996	Admire McArdy; 1991	Mrs McArdy	Hanina
Dam Rustling Copse 1993	Woodman; 1983	Mr. Prospector	Raise a Native
Dam Rustling Copse 1993	Woodman; 1983	Mr. Prospector	Gold Digger
Dam Rustling Copse 1993	Woodman; 1983	Playmate	Buckpasser
Dam Rustling Copse 1993	Woodman; 1983	Playmate	Intriguing
Dam Rustling Copse 1993	Fieldy; 1983	Northfields	Northern Dancer
Dam Rustling Copse 1993	Fieldy; 1983	Northfields	Little Hut
Dam Rustling Copse 1993	Fieldy; 1983	Gramy	Tapioca
Dam Rustling Copse 1993	Fieldy; 1983	Gramy	Gracile
