= Admire Cozzene =

Japanese Thoroughbred racehorse (1996–2017)

Admire Cozzene アドマイヤコジーン
- Admire Cozzene after winning the 1998 Asahi Hai Sansai Stakes.
- Breed: Thoroughbred
- Sire: Cozzene
- Grandsire: Caro
- Dam: Admire McArdy
- Damsire: Northern Taste
- Sex: Stallion
- Foaled: 8 April 1996
- Died: 6 June 2017 (aged 21)
- Country: Japan
- Color: Gray
- Breeder: Taiki Farm
- Owner: Riichi Kondo
- Racing colors
- Trainer: Mitsuru Hashida
- Jockey: Hiroki Goto
- Record: 23: 6-3-2
- Earnings: ¥381,264,000; HK$800,000

Major wins
- Tokyo Sports Hai Sansai Stakes (1998); Asahi Hai Futurity Stakes (1998); Tokyo Shimbun Hai (2002); Hankyu Hai (2002); Yasuda Kinen (2002)

Awards
- JRA Award for Best Two-Year-Old Colt (1998); JRA Award for Best Sprinter or Miler (2002)

Admire Cozzene (Japanese: アドマイヤコジーン, Hepburn: Adomaiya Kojīn, 8 April 1996 – 6 June 2017) was a Japanese Thoroughbred racehorse and sire. After winning the Asahi Hai Sansai Stakes in 1998, he took a long hiatus and returned to racing in 2000. He then proceeded to win the Yasuda Kinen in 2002 and accumulated a total of ¥381,264,000 along with HK$800,000 from placing fourth in Hong Kong Mile after his racing career.

== Background ==
Admire Cozzene was a gray horse standing at 158 centimeters (about 15.2 hands) tall. He was foaled by Admire McArdy on April 8, 1996, at the Taiki Farm. His sire, Cozzene, is an American-bred racehorse.

He was trained by Mitsuru Hashida, the same trainer of other Japanese racehorses such as Silence Suzuka, Admire Vega, and Deirdre.

== Racing career ==
=== 1998: Three-year-old season (Note: Prior to Japan's conversion to the international age system for racehorses in 2001, they used an old age notation called "kazoedoshi", where horses are considered one year old at birth. Because of this, they are one year older compared to horses from other countries, despite biologically having the same age.) ===
Admire Cozzene made his debut race on October 17 at the Kyoto Racecourse and finished in third place. At this next race, he won by nine lengths against Tai Crusher. Following his first victory, he also won the Tokyo Sports Hai Sansai Stakes by one and a half lengths. At his last race, the G1 Asahi Hai Sansai Stakes, he finished first among fourteen runners.

=== 1999: Four-year-old season ===
During his training at the end of January 1999, he injured his right hind leg, forcing him to miss the Classics. Moreover, as he was just starting to recover, he suffered from avulsion fracture on his left hind leg, further delaying his return for a year and seven months.

=== 2000: Five-year-old season ===
After returning from his hiatus, he failed to win any races this season as he was still suffering from periostitis. At his first race, he only placed fourth. On the Hakodate Kinen, despite being the favorite horse with the odds of 3.1, he only managed to finish in sixth place. After placing 11th at the Sapporo Kinen, his losing streak continues, finishing in eighth consecutively and 11th once again at his last race at that season.

=== 2001: Six-year-old season ===
In his third season, he started by finishing in third at the Hankyu Hai, a length behind the second place and the favorite horse, Black Hawk. At the Lord Derby Challenge Trophy, he placed sixth with a time of 1:36.1. In his next race, he ran in an open race and managed to win in second, losing to Ramjet City by a neck. On the next open races, he both placed in seventh. Lastly, he ran in Hakodate Sprint Stakes and finished in 12th.

=== 2002: Seven-year-old season ===
For his last racing season, he made a comeback by finishing first in the Tokyo Shimbun Hai. He also won the race he previously lost, the Hankyu Hai, by three and a half lengths. Although he lost in the Takamatsunomiya Kinen against Shonan Kampf, he finally won a G1 race again at the Yasuda Kinen by a neck against the horse of the same bracket as his, Dantsu Flame. After that, he finished in second against Believe at the Sprinters Stakes. At his next race, the Mile Championship, he placed in seventh despite being the favorite horse. In his last race, he competed in Hong Kong Mile, where he finished in fourth.

== Stud career ==
Admire Cozzene became a sire in 2003 at the Shadai Stallion Station and was moved to the Rex Stud in 2011. He has sired a total of 471 foals. His temperament during his stud career was described as noisy, but has calmed down a lot. His coat reportedly also turned completely white. Moreover, he had a lot of enthusiastic fans and his gentle features were said to attract many female fans.Some of his progenies are listed below.

Legend:

- c: colt
- f: filly
- bold: G1 stakes

Foaled	Name	Sex	Major wins
2004	Aston Machan	f	Kokura Nisai Stakes, Fantasy Stakes, Fillies' Revue, **Sprinters Stakes**
2006	Metro North	c	Hokkaido Nisai Yushun
2007	Majin Prosper	c	CBC Sho (2x), Hankyu Hai
2008	Hanohano	c	Kyoraku Stakes
2008	Snow Dragon	c	**Sprinters Stakes**

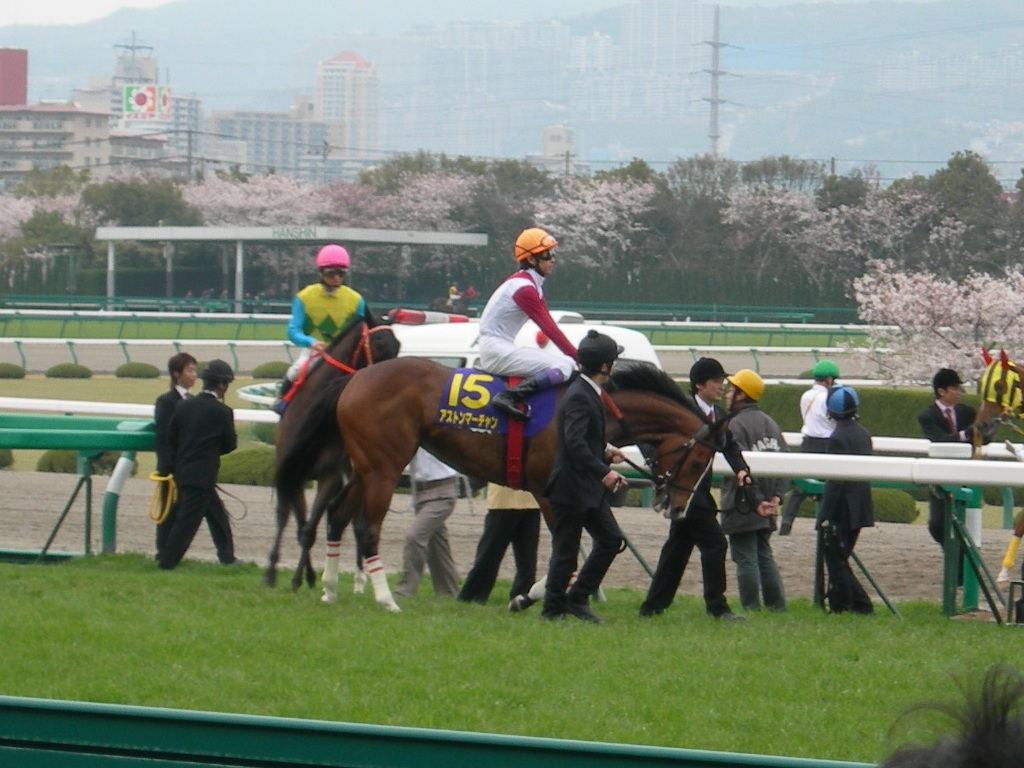
Aston Machan

== Retirement and death ==
According to Rex Co., Ltd., Admire Cozzene received a lot of breeding applications after Snow Dragon's success, though his condition was unfit for breeding and was subsequently retired. He was then moved to Crown Hidaka Farm located in Monbetsu, Hidaka Town in 2015 where he spent his retirement.

He later passed away on June 6, 2017 due to an aortic rupture. Kono Shoichiro, the public relations officer at the Crown Hidaka Farm, said, "We are deeply saddened by his passing. He seemed just as healthy and energetic as ever on the day of his death. It was so sudden that all of our staff were shocked. We have received condolences from fans, and we are reminded once again that he was a horse that was supported by so many fans. By coincidence, a foal of Admire Cozzene was born early that morning, and we hope that he, along with the other foals born this year, will perform well in Cozzene's place."

== Racing record ==
Admire Cozzene had a total of 26 starts, six of which he won where two were G1 races. Although he primarily competed in turf races, he also ran in dirt race twice, with both placing him low. He ran in races with distance ranging from 1,200 to 2,000 meters and was ridden by eight different jockeys throughout his career.

Date	Track	Race	Grade	Distance (Condition)	Bracket (Position)	Entry	Odds (Favored)	Finish	Time	Margin	Jockey	Winner (Runner-up)
**1998 – three-year-old season**
Oct 17	Kyoto	3YO Debut		1400m (Heavy)	1 (1)	9	2.7 (2)	3rd	1:26.9	0.4	Katsumi Minai	Fornalina
Nov 1	Kyoto	3YO Debut		1600m (Firm)	7 (9)	12	2.6 (1)	1st	1:36.1	-1.4	Michael Roberts	(Tai Crusher)
Nov 21	Tokyo	Tokyo Sports Hai Sansai Stakes	G3	1800m (Firm)	4 (4)	10	2.0 (1)	1st	1:49.5	-0.2	Katsumi Minai	(Big Viking)
Dec 13	Nakayama	Asahi Hai Sansai Stakes	G1	1600m (Firm)	5 (8)	14	3.3 (1)	1st	1:35.3	0.0	Michael Roberts	(Eishin Cameron)
**2000 – five-year-old season**
Jul 9	Hakodate	UHB Hai	OP	1800m (Firm)	2 (2)	10	5.3 (3)	4th	1:49.7	0.4	Norihiro Yokoyama	Daiwa Caerleon
Jul 23	Hakodate	Hakodate Kinen	G3	2000m (Good)	8 (16)	16	3.1 (1)	6th	2:03.1	0.4	Norihiro Yokoyama	Craftsmanship
Aug 20	Sapporo	Sapporo Kinen	G2	2000m (Firm)	8 (14)	14	5.4 (3)	11th	2:01.0	1.1	Hiroki Goto	Daiwa Caerleon
Oct 21	Tokyo	Fuji Stakes	G3	1600m (Firm)	6 (11)	16	15.5 (10)	8th	1:34.5	0.6	Hiroki Goto	Daiwa Caerleon
Nov 25	Kyoto	Keihan Hai	G3	1800m (Firm)	6 (12)	18	12.8 (7)	8th	1:45.8	0.6	Junichi Serizawa	Joten Brave
Dec 9	Hanshin	Sirius Stakes	G3	1400m (Fast)	4 (8)	16	15.2 (4)	11th	1:24.4	1.1	Hiroyuki Uemura	Meiner Brian
**2001 – six-year-old season**
Feb 25	Hanshin	Hankyu Hai	G3	1200m (Firm)	4 (6)	14	42.1 (9)	3rd	1:09.0	0.3	Hiroyuki Uemura	Daitaku Yamato
Apr 1	Nakayama	Lord Derby Challenge Trophy	G3	1600m (Good)	5 (9)	14	10.5 (4)	6th	1:36.1	0.4	Hiroyuki Uemura	Checkmate
Apr 22	Fukushima	Fukushima Mimpo Hai	OP	1200m (Firm)	4 (8)	16	4.5 (2)	2nd	1:09.8	0.0	Hiroyuki Uemura	Ramjet City
May 6	Kyoto	Ritto Stakes	OP	1200m (Fast)	6 (8)	12	12.5 (7)	7th	1:11.5	0.5	Hiroyuki Uemura	Gold Maker
Jun 10	Hakodate	UHB Hai	OP	1200m (Firm)	7 (9)	11	4.8 (3)	7th	1:10.5	0.5	Hiroyuki Uemura	Taiki Treasure
Jul 1	Hakodate	Hakodate Sprint Stakes	G3	1200m (Good)	4 (6)	14	29.8 (9)	12th	1:12.0	2.5	Hiroyuki Uemura	Mejiro Darling
**2002 – seven-year-old season**
Jan 27	Tokyo	Tokyo Shimbun Hai	G3	1600m (Heavy)	7 (9)	12	44.8 (10)	1st	1:37.7	-0.1	Hiroki Goto	(Divine Light)
Feb 24	Hanshin	Hankyu Hai	G3	1200m (Firm)	2 (3)	16	5.7 (2)	1st	1:07.9	-0.6	Hiroki Goto	(Dantsu Cast)
Mar 24	Chukyo	Takamatsunomiya Kinen	G1	1200m (Firm)	5 (9)	18	3.6 (2)	2nd	1:09.0	0.6	Hiroki Goto	Shonan Kampf
Jun 2	Tokyo	Yasuda Kinen	G1	1600m (Firm)	8 (18)	18	15.8 (7)	1st	1:33.3	0.0	Hiroki Goto	(Dantsu Flame)
Sep 29	Niigata	Sprinters Stakes	G1	1200m (Firm)	7 (9)	11	5.7 (3)	2nd	1:07.8	0.1	Hiroki Goto	Believe
Nov 17	Kyoto	Mile Championship	G1	1600m (Firm)	6 (12)	18	2.7 (1)	7th	1:33.1	0.3	Hiroki Goto	Tokai Point
Dec 15	Sha Tin	Hong Kong Mile	G1	1600m (Firm)	(3)	12	6.1 (3)	4th	1:35.1	0.2	Yutaka Take	Olympic Express

Dirt

== Pedigree ==
Pedigree of Admire Cozzene, gray horse, foaled 8 April 1996
Sire Cozzene gr. 1980 (USA)	Caro gr. 1967 (IRE)	Fortino (FR)	Grey Sovereign (USA)
Sire Cozzene gr. 1980 (USA)	Caro gr. 1967 (IRE)	Fortino (FR)	Ranavalo (FR)
Sire Cozzene gr. 1980 (USA)	Caro gr. 1967 (IRE)	Chambord (GB)	Chamossaire (GB)
Sire Cozzene gr. 1980 (USA)	Caro gr. 1967 (IRE)	Chambord (GB)	Life Hill (GB)
Sire Cozzene gr. 1980 (USA)	Ride the Trails b. 1971 (USA)	Prince John (USA)	Princequillo (IRE)
Sire Cozzene gr. 1980 (USA)	Ride the Trails b. 1971 (USA)	Prince John (USA)	Not Afraid (USA)
Sire Cozzene gr. 1980 (USA)	Ride the Trails b. 1971 (USA)	Wildwook (USA)	Sir Gaylord (USA)
Sire Cozzene gr. 1980 (USA)	Ride the Trails b. 1971 (USA)	Wildwook (USA)	Blue Canoe (USA)
Dam Admire McArdy ch. 1991 (JPN)	Northern Taste ch. 1971 (CAN)	Northern Dancer (CAN)	Nearctic (ITY)
Dam Admire McArdy ch. 1991 (JPN)	Northern Taste ch. 1971 (CAN)	Northern Dancer (CAN)	Natalma (USA)
Dam Admire McArdy ch. 1991 (JPN)	Northern Taste ch. 1971 (CAN)	Lady Victoria (CAN)	Victoria Park (CAN)
Dam Admire McArdy ch. 1991 (JPN)	Northern Taste ch. 1971 (CAN)	Lady Victoria (CAN)	Lady Angela (GB)
Dam Admire McArdy ch. 1991 (JPN)	Mrs McArdy b. 1974 (GB)	Tribal Chief (GB)	Princely Gift (GB)
Dam Admire McArdy ch. 1991 (JPN)	Mrs McArdy b. 1974 (GB)	Tribal Chief (GB)	Mwanza (GB)
Dam Admire McArdy ch. 1991 (JPN)	Mrs McArdy b. 1974 (GB)	Hanina (GB)	Darling Boy (GB)
Dam Admire McArdy ch. 1991 (JPN)	Mrs McArdy b. 1974 (GB)	Hanina (GB)	Blue Sash (GB) (Family: 14-b)
