= Believe (horse) =

Japanese-bred Thoroughbred racehorse

Believe ビリーヴ
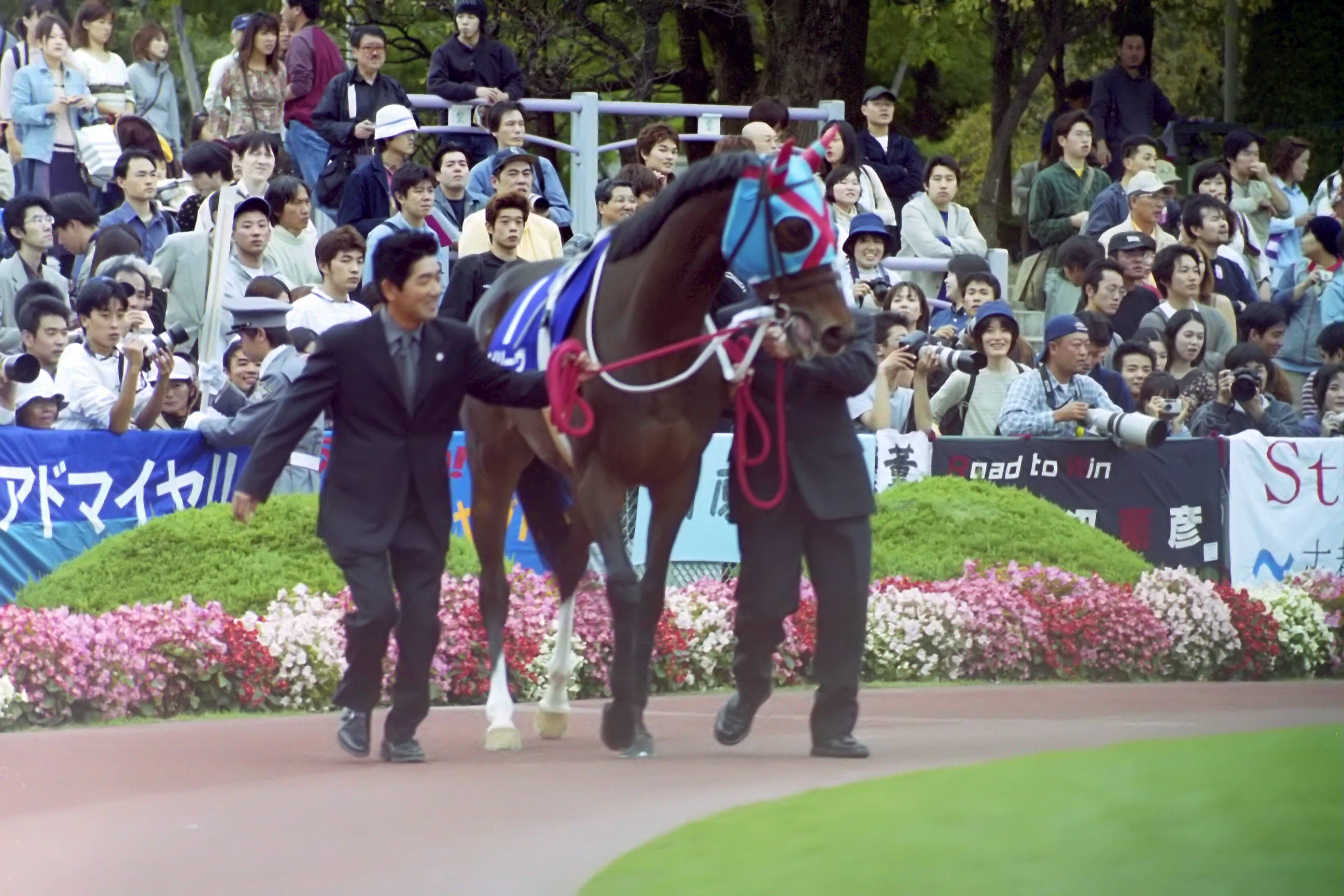
- Believe at her retirement ceremony at Kyoto Racecourse in 2003.
- Breed: Thoroughbred
- Sire: Sunday Silence (USA)
- Grandsire: Halo (USA)
- Dam: Great Christine (USA)
- Damsire: Danzig (USA)
- Sex: Mare
- Foaled: April 26, 1998 (age 28)
- Country: Japan
- Color: Bay
- Breeder: Uemizu Bokujo
- Owner: Koji Maeda
- Racing colors
- Trainer: Shigeki Matsumoto
- Jockey: Yuichi Fukunaga; Yasunari Iwata; Yutaka Take; Katsumi Ando
- Record: 28: 10-3-5
- Earnings: ¥460,313,000

Major wins
- Centaur Stakes (2002); Sprinters Stakes (2002); Takamatsunomiya Kinen (2003); Hakodate Sprint Stakes (2003)

Awards
- JRA Award for Best Older Filly or Mare (2003)

Believe (Japanese: ビリーヴ, Hepburn: Birīvu, foaled 26 April 1998) is a retired Japanese Thoroughbred racehorse and broodmare who was active in the early 2000s. She was known for winning the Sprinters Stakes in 2002 and the Takamatsunomiya Kinen in 2003. In her final season, she was awarded the JRA Award for Best Older Filly or Mare. Her total earnings were ¥460,313,000.

== Background ==
Believe is a bay mare foaled on 26 April 1998 by Great Christine, a daughter of Danzig. She was sired by Sunday Silence, the leading sire in Japan from 1995 until 2007.

She was purchased for ¥63,000,000 at the 1998 JRA Select Sale.

== Racing career ==
=== 2000: two-year-old season ===
She made her debut under Yuichi Fukunaga on November 11 when she led the race from the start and won by two and half lengths over Mad Party. She raced once again one month later, finishing in sixth place. In her second race, Fukunaga stated that "1600 meters is a little too long for her. 1400 meters would be better," which foreshadowed that all her future wins would come in 1200-meter races.

=== 2001: three-year-old season ===
In 2001, Believe started in eight races and managed to win two and finish in third place twice. Her win for the year came at one three-year-old allowance race in May and also the Daigo Tokubetsu in November. She ran in two graded races for the year, the Flower Cup and Falcon Stakes, in which she disappointingly finished in eighth and ninth, respectively. Considering Fukunaga ran her primarily in a front-running strategy to this point, he said, "If she can learn to run from behind, I'm looking forward to seeing what she can do in the future."

=== 2002: four-year-old season ===
At the beginning of this season, Believe started pretty well with three podium finishes under Fukunaga before switching the jockey to Katsumi Ando on her third season start. For her fourth race of the year at the Yodobayashi Stakes, she went with Yasunari Iwata. This change worked as she was having a good race at third position before recorded the fastest final three furlong speed (alongside two others) to win the race by six lengths over Resurreccion. She would be back to Fukunaga at the next race which would be Keio Hai Spring Cup and finished in third place, the first podium she got on a graded race. Fukunaga then ride her for two more races and won the Sasebo Stakes in July before reassigned the job to Iwata again. Iwata rode Believe to two more win at the Kitakyushu Tankyori Stakes and the Centaur Stakes, which was her first graded stakes win.

On September 29, Believe would run at the Sprinters Stakes, which was her first grade 1 race start. This year edition would be held at the Niigata Racecourse instead of Nakayama. Believe who was ridden by Yutaka Take this time around, settled in early phase on third position once the gate opened. Then, Take tried to squeeze between Shonan Kampf and Admire Cozzene but her path forward became narrow. Suddenly, the tide was over in an instant as Take masterfully changed the course to the inside and unleashed a burst of speed at the end. Both of the horses tried to recover but failed as Believe won her first G1 sprint race. For the post race comment, Take said "It was a tight spot, but she didn't flinch and went into the pack. She's a really great horse. Please give the horse some praise today. I just rode her normally." She closed her season with a run at the Hong Kong Sprint, in which she only managed to finish 12th-place in her first oversea race.

=== 2003: five-year-old season ===
She started the year with a run at the Hankyu Hai. In this race, she was unable to run well and only finished in ninth place behind the winner, Shonan Kampf. Then in March, Believe ran at the Takamatsunomiya Kinen. Since the race coincided with the Dubai World Cup, Take, who was also assigned for Gold Allure, was unable to ride her for the day. The task was given instead to Ando, who rode her at the beginning of the previous season. The race began with the first favourite, Shonan Kampf, storming into the lead whilst Believe followed closely behind in third place on the inside, marking him. The split time for the first 600 m was 32.9 seconds, which was really fast. At this pace, Shonan Kampf couldn't keep up as he fell down the order at the final 100 metres. As the horses that had been ahead dropped out one after another, Believe managed to make a strong finishing burst and crossed the finish line first. This was Ando first grade 1 race win in his career and he became Believe main jockey for the rest of the season.

Ando and Believe finished outside the podium at the next two races (eighth at the Keio Hai Spring Cup and 12th at the Yasuda Kinen). Then, she won at the Hakodate Sprint Stakes after securing a good position at the start and finished strongly two lengths in front of Agnes Sonic. For her final two races of her career before retiring, she finished second at the two races she won the previous year which were the Centaur Stakes and Sprinters Stakes. She lost both race by the slimmest of nose margin against Tenshino Kiseki and Durandal respectively. At the end of the season, she was inaugurated with the best award for older filly and mare by the Japanese Racing Association.

== Breeding career ==
Following her retirement from racing, Believe was sent to the United States to assume broodmare duties at Lane's End Farm. She has produced seven foals from 2005 to 2015. Her youngest and most notable progeny is Gendarme who won the Sprinters Stakes in 2022, which marked the first occasion where a mother and her son won the same race, twenty years apart. On February 24, 2025, Gendarme suffered a fracture of the femur in his left hind leg and was subsequently euthanized.

c = colt, f = filly, g = gelding

No.	Name	Foaled	Sex	Color	Sire	Wins	Races	Remarks
1st	Faridat	2005	c	Brown	Kingmambo	5	53	Retired
2nd	Kazanlik	2007	c	Bay	Kingmambo	1	13	Retired
3rd	Corundum	2008	g	Dark Bay	A.P. Indy	7	84	Retired
4th	Vrai Roi	2010	g	Bay	A.P. Indy	0	4	Retired
5th	Fiducia	2012	f	Bay	Medaglia d'Oro	7	26	Retired, broodmare
6th	Elisheva	2013	f	Bay	Smart Strike	4	20	Retired, broodmare
7th	Gendarme	2015	c	Dark Bay	Kitten's Joy	7	30	Retired, breeding stallion

== In popular culture ==
An anthropomorphized version of Believe appears as a character in the Japanese multimedia franchise Umamusume: Pretty Derby, voiced by Misaki Akiyama.

== Racing record ==
Throughout her career, she won 10 out of her 28 races, two of which are G1 races. She also ran in Hong Kong Sprint but was unsuccessful. She was ridden by seven different jockeys.

Date	Track	Race	Grade	Distance (Condition)	Bracket (Position)	Entry	Odds (Favored)	Finish	Time	Margin	Jockey	Winner (Runner-up)
2000 – two-year-old season
Nov 11	Kyoto	2YO Debut		1200m (Firm)	2 (2)	12	1.5 (1)	1st	1:10.5	-0.4	Yuichi Fukunaga	(Mad Party)
Dec 10	Hanshin	2YO	ALW (1 Win)	1600m (Firm)	1 (1)	12	3.8 (2)	6th	1:36.6	0.7	Yuichi Fukunaga	Millennium Bio
2001 – three-year-old season
Jan 6	Kyoto	Wakana Sho	ALW (1 Win)	1200m (Fast)	5 (10)	16	6.9 (3)	9th	1:14.8	0.3	Mikio Matsunaga	Koei Marvelous
Jan 27	Kyoto	Kanzakura Sho	ALW (1 Win)	1200m (Heavy)	4 (8)	16	8.4 (4)	4th	1:12.1	0.5	Mikio Matsunaga	Toyo Lincoln
Mar 17	Nakayama	Flower Cup	G3	1800m (Firm)	7 (14)	16	22.7 (11)	8th	1:51.0	0.8	Jotaro Horai	Time Fair Lady
May 4	Kyoto	Azusa Sho	ALW (1 Win)	1600m (Firm)	8 (18)	18	6.9 (3)	3rd	1:34.9	0.2	Yuichi Fukunaga	Soleil Dance
May 19	Chukyo	3YO	ALW (1 Win)	1200m (Firm)	2 (4)	18	4.4 (2)	1st	1:08.3	-0.1	Yuichi Fukunaga	(Gold Disc)
Jun 10	Chukyo	Falcon Stakes	G3	1200m (Firm)	3 (6)	17	19.9 (9)	9th	1:09.6	0.7	Yuichi Fukunaga	Rusunai Christie
Nov 10	Kyoto	Daigo Tokubetsu	ALW (2 Win)	1200m (Firm)	2 (2)	13	8.5 (6)	1st	1:08.8	-0.2	Yuichi Fukunaga	(Check the Luck)
Dec 15	Hanshin	Sasegawa Stakes	ALW (3 Win)	1600m (Firm)	6 (12)	16	8.5 (6)	3rd	1:34.2	0.3	Futoshi Komaki	Meisho Kio
2002 – four-year-old season
Feb 17	Kyoto	Yamashiro Stakes	ALW (3 Win)	1200m (Firm)	2 (2)	10	3.7 (1)	2nd	1:08.2	0.4	Yuichi Fukunaga	Shonan Kampf
Mar 10	Hanshin	Mukogawa Stakes	ALW (3 Win)	1600m (Firm)	8 (15)	15	5.3 (4)	3rd	1:34.0	0.8	Yuichi Fukunaga	Grass World
Mar 24	Nakayama	Funabashi Stakes	ALW (1 Win)	1200m (Firm)	6 (6)	11	2.5 (1)	3rd	1:08.2	0.4	Katsumi Ando	Happy Maximum
Apr 14	Hanshin	Yodoyabashi Stakes	ALW (3 Win)	1200m (Firm)	7 (14)	16	3.9 (1)	1st	1:07.7	-1.0	Yasunari Iwata	(Resurreccion)
May 12	Tokyo	Keio Hai Spring Cup	G2	1400m (Firm)	8 (17)	18	14.9 (7)	3rd	1:20.5	0.2	Yuichi Fukunaga	God of Chance
Jun 8	Chukyo	TV Aichi Open	OP	1200m (Firm)	5 (9)	18	1.9 (1)	7th	1:09.3	0.7	Yuichi Fukunaga	Native Heart
Jul 20	Kokura	Sasebo Stakes	ALW (3 Win)	1200m (Firm)	8 (10)	11	1.9 (1)	1st	1:07.7	-0.1	Yuichi Fukunaga	(Osumi Erst)
Aug 17	Kokura	Kitakyushu Tankyori Stakes	ALW (3 Win)	1200m (Firm)	6 (6)	10	2.0 (1)	1st	1:07.8	-0.4	Yasunari Iwata	(Osumi Erst)
Sep 8	Hanshin	Centaur Stakes	G3	1200m (Firm)	1 (1)	12	2.0 (1)	1st	1:07.1	-0.7	Yasunari Iwata	(Paian)
Sep 29	Niigata	Sprinters Stakes	G1	1200m (Firm)	4 (4)	11	2.2 (1)	1st	1:07.7	-0.1	Yutaka Take	(Admire Cozzene)
Dec 15	Sha Tin	Hong Kong Sprint	G1	1000m (Firm)	(11)	14	4.7	12th	0:58.1	1.7	Yutaka Take	All Thrills Too
2003 – five-year-old season
Mar 2	Hanshin	Hankyu Hai	G3	1200m (Good)	6 (10)	15	3.7 (2)	9th	1:09.6	1.1	Yutaka Take	Shonan Kampf
Mar 30	Chukyo	Takamatsunomiya Kinen	G1	1200m (Firm)	1 (1)	18	10.1 (3)	1st	1:08.1	-0.2	Katsumi Ando	(Sunningdale)
May 18	Tokyo	Keio Hai Spring Cup	G2	1400m (Firm)	6 (9)	13	6.9 (4)	4th	1:21.8	0.8	Katsumi Ando	Telegnosis
Jun 8	Tokyo	Yasuda Kinen	G1	1600m (Firm)	3 (5)	18	22.4 (9)	12th	1:32.8	0.7	Katsumi Ando	Agnes Digital
Jul 6	Hakodate	Hakodate Sprint Stakes	G3	1200m (Firm)	6 (7)	11	1.7 (1)	1st	1:09.3	-0.3	Katsumi Ando	(Agnes Sonic)
Sep 14	Hanshin	Centaur Stakes	G3	1200m (Firm)	2 (2)	13	1.8 (1)	2nd	1:07.8	0.0	Katsumi Ando	Tenshino Kiseki
Oct 5	Nakayama	Sprinters Stakes	G1	1200m (Firm)	6 (11)	15	2.2 (1)	2nd	1:08.0	0.0	Katsumi Ando	Durandal

Turf Dirt

== Pedigree ==
Pedigree of Believe, bay mare, 26 April 1998
Sire Sunday Silence br. 1986 (USA)	Halo dk.b. 1969 (USA)	Hail To Reason (USA)	Turn-to (IRE)
Sire Sunday Silence br. 1986 (USA)	Halo dk.b. 1969 (USA)	Hail To Reason (USA)	Nothirdchance (USA)
Sire Sunday Silence br. 1986 (USA)	Halo dk.b. 1969 (USA)	Cosmah (USA)	Cosmic Bomb (USA)
Sire Sunday Silence br. 1986 (USA)	Halo dk.b. 1969 (USA)	Cosmah (USA)	Almahmoud (USA)
Sire Sunday Silence br. 1986 (USA)	Wishing Well b. 1975 (USA)	Understanding (USA)	Promised Land (USA)
Sire Sunday Silence br. 1986 (USA)	Wishing Well b. 1975 (USA)	Understanding (USA)	Pretty Ways (USA)
Sire Sunday Silence br. 1986 (USA)	Wishing Well b. 1975 (USA)	Mountain Flower (USA)	Montparnasse (ARG)
Sire Sunday Silence br. 1986 (USA)	Wishing Well b. 1975 (USA)	Mountain Flower (USA)	Edelweiss (USA)
Dam Great Christine b. 1987 (USA)	Danzig b. 1977 (USA)	Northern Dancer (CAN)	Nearctic (CAN)
Dam Great Christine b. 1987 (USA)	Danzig b. 1977 (USA)	Northern Dancer (CAN)	Natalma (USA)
Dam Great Christine b. 1987 (USA)	Danzig b. 1977 (USA)	Pas de Nom (USA)	Admiral's Voyage (USA)
Dam Great Christine b. 1987 (USA)	Danzig b. 1977 (USA)	Pas de Nom (USA)	Petitioner (GB)
Dam Great Christine b. 1987 (USA)	Great Lady M. gr. 1975 (USA)	Icecapade (USA)	Nearctic (CAN)
Dam Great Christine b. 1987 (USA)	Great Lady M. gr. 1975 (USA)	Icecapade (USA)	Shenanigans (USA)
Dam Great Christine b. 1987 (USA)	Great Lady M. gr. 1975 (USA)	Sovereign Lady (USA)	Young Emperor (GB)
Dam Great Christine b. 1987 (USA)	Great Lady M. gr. 1975 (USA)	Sovereign Lady (USA)	Sweety Kid (USA) (Family: 22-d)

Inbreeding:

- Nearctic: M4 x M4
