= Durandal (horse) =

Japanese Thoroughbred racehorse (1999–2013)

Durandal デュランダル
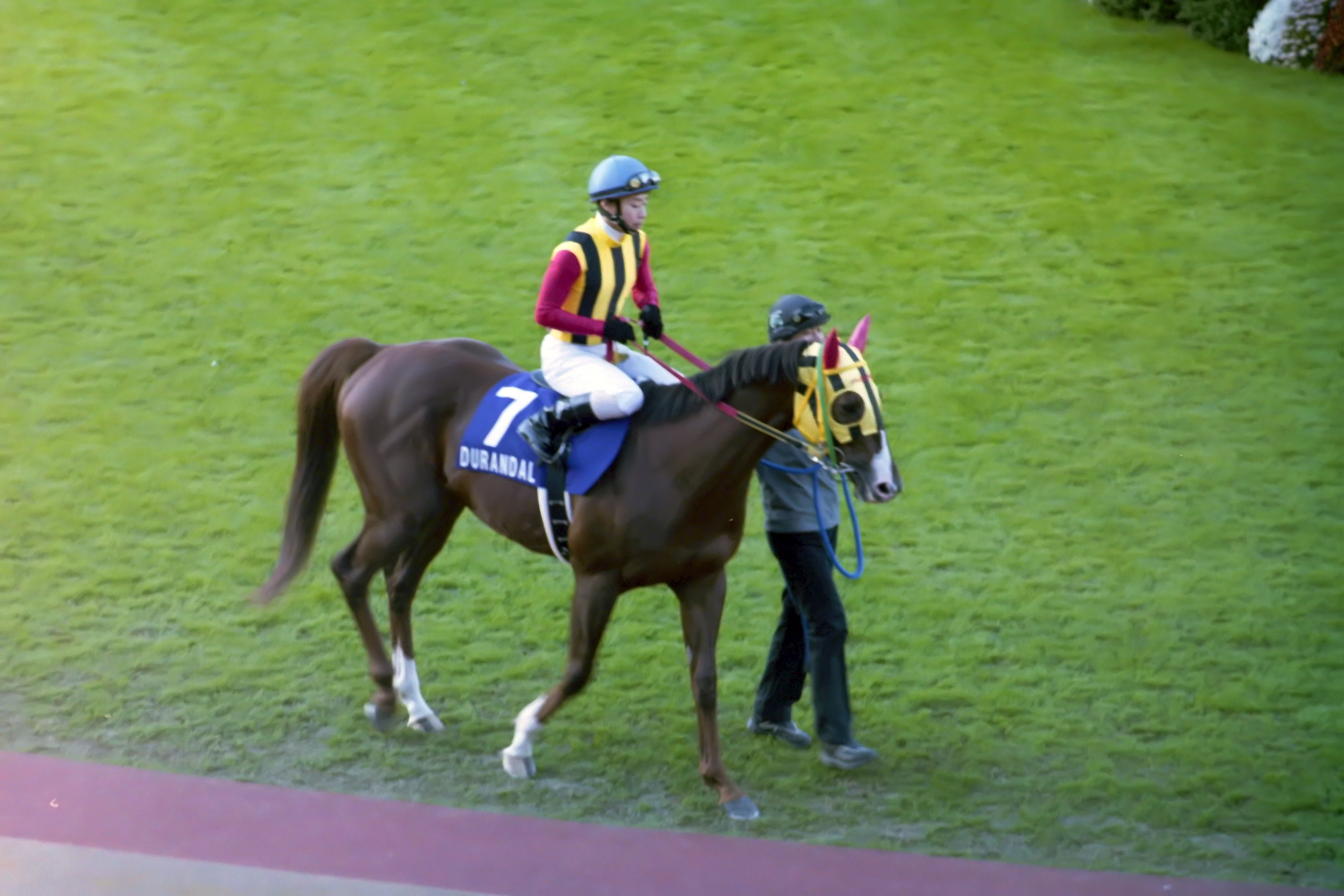
- Durandal at the 2004 Mile Championship.
- Breed: Thoroughbred
- Sire: Sunday Silence (USA)
- Grandsire: Halo (USA)
- Dam: Sawayaka Princess (JPN)
- Damsire: Northern Taste (CAN)
- Sex: Stallion
- Foaled: May 25, 1999
- Died: July 7, 2013 (aged 14)
- Country: Japan
- Color: Chestnut
- Breeder: Shadai Farm
- Owner: Teruya Yoshida
- Racing colors
- Trainer: Masahiro Takaguchi
- Jockey: Masayoshi Ebina; Kenichi Ikezoe
- Record: 18: 8-4-1
- Earnings: ¥503,232,000

Major wins
- Sprinters Stakes (2003); Mile Championship (2003, 2004)

Awards
- JRA Award for Best Sprinter or Miler (2003, 2004)

Durandal (Japanese: デュランダル, Hepburn: Durandaru, 25 May 1999 – 7 July 2013) was a Japanese-bred Thoroughbred racehorse and sire who was known for his success in sprint or mile races. In his racing career from 2001 to 2005, he won 8 races, notably the G1 grade races Sprinters Stakes and the Mile Championship consecutively. He was then awarded the JRA Award for Best Sprinter or Miler for 2003 and 2004.

== Background ==
Durandal was born on May 25, 1999, at Shadai Farm in Chitose, Hokkaido. His dam, Sawayaka Princess, one of Northern Taste's foals, had won four races on both turf and dirt at short distances during her racing career, His sire, Sunday Silence, had already been named Japan’s Leading Sire at that time, and this was his fifth mating with Sawayaka Princess. The horse’s name was inspired by the royal connotations of his dam’s name, and the majestic image of his sire. He was named “Durandal” after the sacred sword bestowed upon the hero Roland by Charlemagne in the French epic poem, the Song of Roland.

== Racing career ==
=== 2001–2002: two & three-year-old seasons ===
In December 2001, Durandal made his debut in a maiden race at Hanshin Racecourse. Ridden by Yutaka Take, he lived up to his status as the favorite (win odds of 1.4) and secured the victory. However, he subsequently developed osteochondroma and, with no clear prospect of recovery, was sidelined for an extended period. He returned in August 2002 and, starting with his second race back—the Chikushi Tokubetsu—won three consecutive conditional races.

In his first-ever GI start, the Mile Championship on November 7, 2002, he ran as the seventh favorite at 19.5-to-1 odds. Although he showed a strong late charge from the back of the pack in a tightly contested race, he finished in 10th place. In light of this defeat, Durandal’s team concluded that “he is not a horse capable of competing in GI races” and decided to enter him in two open races. In the December Stakes on December 14, jockey Masayoshi Ebina rode him in a relatively forward position, but he finished fourth.

=== 2003: four-year-old season ===
In the New Year’s Stakes in January 2003, Ebina remained in the saddle; however, unlike in his previous race, Durandal made a late charge from the back of the pack to win the race, securing his first victory in an open race. In the subsequent Nakayama Kinen on March 2, with Yoshitomi Shibata taking over as jockey, he started as the fifth favorite but suffered a crushing defeat, finishing ninth in a field of 11.

After the defeat in the Nakayama Kinen, the horse was given a rest and returned to racing in the Centaur Stakes on September 14, switching to jockey Kenichi Ikezoe, who would ride him until his retirement. Durandal started as the fourth favorite, while his full sister, Maruka Sawayaka, started as the tenth favorite. In the race, he ran from the back of the pack, biding his time, and in the final stretch, he closed in on the front-runners Tenshi no Kiseeki and Believe from behind but finished in third place.

In the wake of this defeat, trainer Masahiro Sakaguchi had been considering entering the horse in the Port Island Stakes, an Open race, for its next start, but jockey Ikezoe suggested, “Let’s go for the Sprinters’ Stakes,” urging him to enter the Grade I race. Ikezoe reasoned, “Since we lost the Centaur Stakes due to my own mistake, if I can ride him well, we might have a chance in a GI race,” and appealed directly to Sakaguchi; the team accepted this and decided to enter the race. However, leading up to the race, Sakaguchi remained concerned about Durandal’s temperament and stated, “Just making the board would be enough.”

In the Sprinters’ Stakes on October 5, Believe—a two-time GI winner making her retirement race—was the favorite at 2.2-to-1 odds, while Durandal was the fifth favorite at 8.1-to-1 odds. In the race, he started from the very back of the field, with Tenshin no Kiseeki and Believe leading the front group, followed by popular contenders such as Lady Blonde and Admire Max. As the field entered the home stretch from the final turn, Believe broke away to take the lead, but Durandal made a furious charge from the far outside and overtook Believe just before the finish line to claim his first graded stakes and Grade I victory. In this race, he recorded a final three-furlong split of 33.1 seconds, the fastest among the 15 runners. After the race, Ikezoe commented, “This horse’s second and third strides are a bit slow. After that, it was business as usual. The response when I gave the go-ahead was incredible. (Omitted) His finishing kick is top-class. I definitely don’t think he’s just a 1,200-meter horse, so I’m looking forward to seeing what he does next,” while Sakaguchi remarked, “On a course with a hill, 1,200 meters is fine, but on a flat course, I think a slightly longer distance would suit him better,” hinting at their confidence in his finishing kick and their intention to challenge him at even longer distances.

As indicated in their comments following the Sprinters Stakes victory, the team selected the Mile Championship, scheduled for November 23, as his next race. That year’s Mile Championship was held without a clear favorite, as Agnes Digital—the winner of that year’s Yasuda Kinen—and Admire Max—the runner-up—had each chosen different races and opted not to run. As a result, Sidewinder, who had finished second in the preliminary Fuji Stakes, was the favorite, while Fine Motion, who had won the previous year’s Shuka Sho and Queen Elizabeth II Cup, was the second favorite. Although Durandal had officially become a Grade I winner with his previous victory, his performance over the past year—including a 10th-place finish in the previous year’s Mile Championship, a 4th-place finish in the December Stakes, and a 9th-place finish in the Nakayama Kinen—had been lackluster in races over 1,600 meters, leading to whispers of concerns about his ability to handle the distance; consequently, he entered the race as the fifth favorite. However, the training staff had high hopes for him, as he was showing a healthy appetite—unlike before the previous year’s Mile Championship, when he had eaten very little—and had performed well in training. In the race, the pacesetting Gallant Arrow refused to relinquish the lead even as the field entered the home stretch, while Fine Motion, Balance of Game, and others closed in from the center of the track. Durandal, who had moved out to the far outside, was in 15th place as he entered the home stretch, but he accelerated down the stretch to overtake the field, crossing the finish line first by three-quarters of a length ahead of second-place finisher Fine Motion. He became the second horse in history, following 1997’s Taiki Shuttle, to win both the Sprinters Stakes and the Mile Championship. While Fine Motion, who recorded the second-fastest final three-furlong split among all runners in this race at 34.1 seconds, Durandal clocked the fastest time of 33.5 seconds. Furthermore, in recognition of his two consecutive Group 1 victories, he was selected as the JRA Award’s Best Sprinter in 2003.

=== 2004: five-year-old season ===
In 2004, the campaign began with the Takamatsunomiya Kinen held at Chukyo Racecourse. At that time, Chukyo Racecourse had not yet undergone renovations, so it featured conditions often considered disadvantageous for closing horses—a “flat” track and a “tight” turn—and Sakaguchi cited this as a cause for concern. Furthermore, this was Durandal’s first race on a left-handed course, and the short 314-meter home stretch was also problematic for his running style. On the other hand, in the day’s odds, Durandal was the favorite at 3.6-to-1 for the win, followed by Sunningdale as the second favorite at 4.3-to-1. In the race, Durandal closed from the back of the pack down the stretch but fell just a neck short of Sunningdale, finishing second. After the race, jockey Ikezoe said, “It’s frustrating. My horse showed the best speed. My horse is the strongest. It’s just that a horse that raced more skillfully (Sunningdale) won today; it was by no means a loss due to a lack of ability,” he said, revealing his frustration while showing absolute confidence in the horse’s ability. Later, Ikezoe spoke about this race in relation to Durandal’s temperament, noting that because Durandal was a horse that only needed to accelerate in the home stretch, he was not well-suited to the Chukyo Racecourse before its renovation, where the home stretch was short.

After finishing second in the Takamatsunomiya Kinen, the team had planned to run in the Yasuda Kinen next, but the horse developed a cracked hoof on his right front leg and was withdrawn from the race. As a result, he was sent to Shadai Farm for pasture rest a little earlier than planned, and a farrier was flown in from the United States to treat the cracked hoof by securing it with wire.

Thanks in part to the efforts of Durandal’s team, a return to racing was on the horizon by fall, and he entered the Sprinters’ Stakes on October 3 without any preparatory races following his long layoff. On race day at Nakayama Racecourse, rain fell, resulting in a heavy track; furthermore, for Durandal—whose strength lay in making his move down the stretch from the far outside—starting from gate 1 in the first stall made positioning particularly difficult. In the race, the fifth-favorite, Carston Light O, broke away from the inside gate, while the top favorite, Sunningdale, and the second favorite, Durandal, settled in at the back of the pack. Durandal moved up along the far outside with 600 meters to go. However, in contrast to the horses behind him who struggled on the heavy track, he was unable to close the gap on Carston Light O, who continued to lead. Durandal was the only horse to surge from the far outside and break away from the second-place group to close in on the leader, but he ultimately finished second, four lengths behind Carston Light O.

Although he lost the Sprinters Stakes, his connections were encouraged by Durandal’s performance—finishing second in a Grade I race held on a heavy track after returning from a long layoff due to a leg injury. For his next race, they selected the Mile Championship, scheduled for November 21, which had been upgraded to an international Grade I race that year. Fine Motion, who had finished in the top two in the previous year’s Mile Championship, was the second favorite, while Lacti, competing from the UK, was the third favorite; Durandal, as the defending champion, was backed as the top favorite. During the race, he followed his typical racing style by staying at the back of the pack and biding his time, then caught and passed Dance in the Mood from the outside to take the lead with 100 meters to go, holding on to that position until he crossed the finish line. With this victory, Durandal became the fourth horse in history to win the Mile Championship two years in a row. After the race, Sakaguchi remarked, “The biggest reason for the win is that Ikezoe has the horse under control,” praising the jockey for securing the victory by fully understanding Durandal’s running style and characteristics.

In an interview following his back-to-back Mile Championship victories, Sakaguchi revealed that he was considering entering the Hong Kong Mile, scheduled two weeks later, and later accepted an invitation to run from the Hong Kong Jockey Club. Durandal was awarded the highest rating of 10 points by 11 out of 13 handicappers. On race day, December 11, although the track condition at Sha Tin Racecourse was announced as “Good to Firm” (equivalent to “Good” in Japan), heavy watering caused some horses to lose their balance. In the race, he was unable to demonstrate his signature powerful closing kick on the soft track and finished fifth. That year, Durandal was recognized for his strong performances in short-distance Grade 1 races and was selected as the JRA Award’s Best Short-Distance Horse for the second consecutive year.

=== 2005: six-year-old season ===
In 2005, Durandal developed laminitis, one of the most fatal diseases for horses. Although it was thought he would be unable to continue his racing career and he entered a long layoff, he made his comeback on October 2 of that year in the Sprinters’ Stakes—his first race in 10 months. Despite the long layoff, he was the second favorite at 3.8-to-1 odds, while the favorite was Silent Witness—the two-time consecutive winner of the Hong Kong Sprint—at 2.0-to-1 odds. In the race, he stayed in the rear before unleashing the fastest final three-furlong split of his career at 32.7 seconds, but fell just short of Silent Witness, finishing in second place. Notably, this final three-furlong time remains the fastest in the history of the Sprinters Stakes as of 2026. Looking back on the race years later, Ikezoe remarked, “Even though it was his first race in about 10 months, he finished second right off the bat behind Silent Witness. I was truly impressed—he really was a remarkable horse.”

He then competed in the Mile Championship on November 20, aiming to become the first horse in history to win three consecutive Group 1 races organized by the Japan Racing Association. He was the overwhelming favorite at 1.5-to-1 odds on race day and recorded the fastest final stretch time among the field but finished eighth behind Hat Trick. He retired from racing after this race and began his career as a stallion at Shadai Stallion Station.

== Stud career ==
Durandal became a stud at the Shadai Stallion Station in Abira, Hokkaido. From 2005 until 2013, he bred with 857 mares, produced 513 foals, registered 488 out of them, and earned ¥5,616,913,000 in progeny winnings with AEI of 0.95.

On July 7, 2013, he was found dead in his stall. Miki Endo of Thoroughbred Breeders’ Club Co., Ltd. announced that the cause of death was suspected to be a heart attack.

=== Notable progeny ===
Below data is based on JBIS Stallion Reports.

c = colt, f = filly
bold = grade 1 stakes

Foaled	Name	Sex	Major Wins
2007	Fragarach	c	Chukyo Kinen (twice)
2007	Jewel of Nile	f	Kokura Nisai Stakes
2008	Erin Court	f	**Yushun Himba**
2008	Sanrei Duke	c	Tokyo High-jump, Hanshin Spring Jump
2010	Sweet Salsa	f	Fukushima Himba Stakes
2011	Pray and Real	c	Keisei Hai

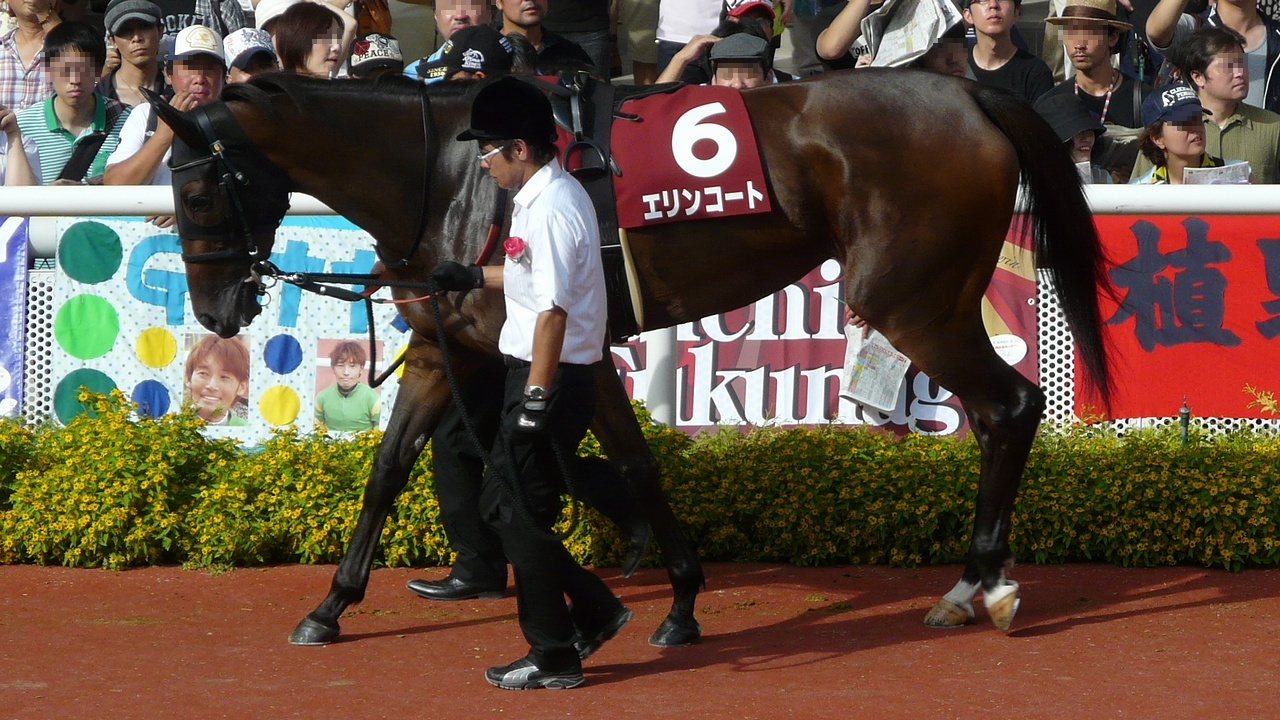
Erin Court

== In popular culture ==
An anthropomorphized version of Durandal appears as a character in the Japanese multimedia franchise Umamusume: Pretty Derby, voiced by Kana Nogi.She is depicted as a knightly, chivalrous girl, as well as the roommate and rival of Calstone Light O, who models herself after medieval knights and views her races as “wielding a holy sword,” seeking to develop her late-race spurt into a “keenly-cutting blade.” In reality, her knightly persona developed from her early childhood of reading about knighthood from adventure tales, which gradually developed into a means to receive praise from those closest to her, such as the player trainer.

== Racing record ==
Durandal's racing statistics taken from both netkeiba and JBIS are shown below.

Date	Age	Race	Grade	Distance	Surface	Condition	Track	Entry	Finish	Time	Margin	Jockey	Winner (Runner-up)
Dec 8, 2001	2	2YO DEBUT		1200m	Turf	Firm	Hanshin	12	1st	1:10.2	-0.2	Yutaka Take	(Hokusetsu Queen)
Aug 10, 2002	3	Arita Tokubetsu	ALW (1 Win)	1200m	Turf	Firm	Kokura	11	2nd	1:08.7	0.3	Yuichi Fukunaga	Monday Musume
Aug 25, 2002	3	Chikushi Tokubetsu	ALW (2 Win)	1200m	Turf	Firm	Kokura	9	1st	1:08.9	-0.3	Hiroshi Kawachi	(Wonder Jolie)
Sep 22, 2002	3	Moonlight Handicap	ALW (2 Win)	1600m	Turf	Firm	Hanshin	12	1st	1:35.4	0.0	Yutaka Take	(Bill and Coo)
Oct 27, 2002	3	Hakushu Stakes	ALW (3 Win)	1200m	Turf	Firm	Nakayama	14	1st	1:07.8	0.0	Yutaka Take	(Keeneland Swan)
Nov 17, 2002	3	Mile Championship	G1	1600m	Turf	Firm	Kyoto	18	10th	1:33.3	0.5	Hirofumi Shii	Tokai Point
Dec 14, 2002	3	December Stakes	OP	1800m	Turf	Firm	Nakayama	10	4th	1:47.5	0.7	Masayoshi Ebina	Lohengrin
Jan 18, 2003	4	New Year Stakes	OP	1600m	Turf	Firm	Nakayama	11	1st	1:33.1	-0.1	Masayoshi Ebina	(Kaori Giovanni)
Mar 2, 2003	4	Nakayama Kinen	G2	1800m	Turf	Soft	Nakayama	12	9th	1:50.2	2.6	Yoshitomi Shibata	Lohengrin
Sep 14, 2003	4	Centaur Stakes	G3	1200m	Turf	Firm	Hanshin	13	3rd	1:08.0	0.2	Kenichi Ikezoe	Tenshino Kiseki
Oct 5, 2003	4	Sprinters Stakes	G1	1200m	Turf	Firm	Nakayama	15	1st	1:08.0	0.0	Kenichi Ikezoe	(Believe)
Nov 23, 2003	4	Mile Championship	G1	1600m	Turf	Firm	Kyoto	18	1st	1:33.3	-0.1	Kenichi Ikezoe	(Fine Motion)
Mar 28, 2004	5	Takamatsunomiya Kinen	G1	1200m	Turf	Firm	Chukyo	18	2nd	1:07.9	0.0	Kenichi Ikezoe	Sunningdale
Oct 3, 2004	5	Sprinters Stakes	G1	1200m	Turf	Heavy	Nakayama	16	2nd	1:10.6	0.7	Kenichi Ikezoe	Calstone Light O
Nov 21, 2004	5	Mile Championship	G1	1600m	Turf	Firm	Kyoto	16	1st	1:33.3	-0.3	Kenichi Ikezoe	Dance in the Mood
Dec 12, 2004	5	Hong Kong Mile	G1	1600m	Turf	Firm	Sha Tin	14	5th	1:34.8	0.2	Kenichi Ikezoe	Firebreak
Oct 2, 2005	6	Sprinters Stakes	G1	1200m	Turf	Firm	Nakayama	16	2nd	1:07.5	0.2	Kenichi Ikezoe	Silent Witness
Nov 20, 2005	6	Mile Championship	G1	1600m	Turf	Firm	Kyoto	17	8th	1:32.5	0.4	Kenichi Ikezoe	Hat Trick

== Pedigree ==
Pedigree of Durandal, chestnut horse, 1999
Sire Sunday Silence br. 1986	Halo dk.b. 1969	Hail To Reason	Turn-to
Sire Sunday Silence br. 1986	Halo dk.b. 1969	Hail To Reason	Nothirdchance
Sire Sunday Silence br. 1986	Halo dk.b. 1969	Cosmah	Cosmic Bomb
Sire Sunday Silence br. 1986	Halo dk.b. 1969	Cosmah	Almahmoud
Sire Sunday Silence br. 1986	Wishing Well b. 1975	Understanding	Promised Land
Sire Sunday Silence br. 1986	Wishing Well b. 1975	Understanding	Pretty Ways
Sire Sunday Silence br. 1986	Wishing Well b. 1975	Mountain Flower	Montparnasse
Sire Sunday Silence br. 1986	Wishing Well b. 1975	Mountain Flower	Edelweiss
Dam Sawayaka Princess ch. 1986	Northern Taste ch. 1971	Northern Dancer	Nearctic
Dam Sawayaka Princess ch. 1986	Northern Taste ch. 1971	Northern Dancer	Natalma
Dam Sawayaka Princess ch. 1986	Northern Taste ch. 1971	Lady Victoria	Victoria Park
Dam Sawayaka Princess ch. 1986	Northern Taste ch. 1971	Lady Victoria	Lady Angela
Dam Sawayaka Princess ch. 1986	Scotch Princess ch. 1970	Creme dela Creme	Olympia
Dam Sawayaka Princess ch. 1986	Scotch Princess ch. 1970	Creme dela Creme	Judy Rullah
Dam Sawayaka Princess ch. 1986	Scotch Princess ch. 1970	Meadow Saffron	High Perch
Dam Sawayaka Princess ch. 1986	Scotch Princess ch. 1970	Meadow Saffron	Meadow Music

- Durandal's half-brother, Saikyo Sunday, won a graded stakes race, the Chunichi Sports Award 4-Year-Old Stakes.
- Durandal's half-sister, Maruka Sawayaka, recorded five wins in 39 starts, primarily in short-distance races.
