= Gildoran =

Irish-bred Thoroughbred racehorse

- Sire: Rheingold
- Grandsire: Faberge
- Dam: Durtal
- Damsire: Lyphard
- Sex: Stallion
- Foaled: 6 June 1980
- Country: Ireland
- Colour: Bay
- Owner: Robert Sangster
- Trainer: Barry Hills
- Record: 22:7-3-2

Major wins
- Sagaro Stakes (1984); Ascot Gold Cup (1984, 1985); Goodwood Cup (1984)

Awards
- Gilbey Racing Champion Stayer (1984); Timeform rating: 117 (1983), 123 (1984), 117 (1985)

Gildoran (foaled 6 June 1980) was an Irish-bred, British-trained Thoroughbred racehorse and stallion. A specialist stayer he won the Ascot Gold Cup in 1984 and 1985. His other wins included the Sagaro Stakes and the Goodwood Cup. In all, he won seven races in a twenty-two race career which lasted from 1983 until 1985, during which he showed an aptitude for extreme distances and fast ground. He made little impact at stud.

== Background ==
Gildoran was a bay horse with a white star and stripe. He was one of the best horses sired by Rheingold, the winner of the 1973 Prix de l'Arc de Triomphe. Gildoran was the first foal of his dam Durtal, a top-class racemare who won the Cheveley Park Stakes in 1976. As a daughter of the influential broodmare Derna, Durtal was closely related to many leading racehorses including Detroit, Zabeel and Carnegie. Throughout his racing career Gildoran was owned by Robert Sangster and trained at Lambourn in Berkshire by Barry Hills

== Racing career ==
=== 1982 & 1983: early career ===
Gildoran raced twice without success over seven furlongs as a two-year-old in 1982. In 1983 he ran eight times, winning a maiden race over twelve furlongs at Newmarket Racecourse, an apprentice riders' race at Bath Racecourse and a handicap race over one and three quarter mile at Goodwood. He finished unplaced in the Ebor Handicap at York Racecourse in August and was then moved up in class and distance to contest the Doncaster Cup over two and a quarter miles in September. He produced his best performance of the season, finishing second by two and a half lengths to the five-year-old Karadar.

=== 1984: four-year-old season ===
Gildoran began his third season by finishing unplaced in a handicap at Newmarket and then recorded his first important success when he won the Group Three Sagaro Stakes over two miles at Ascot Racecourse. Ridden by Steve Cauthen he started at odds of 11/2 and won from Society Boy and Another Sam. He was then assigned a weight of 139 pounds in the Chester Cup and finished unplaced behind Contester. In June Gildoran was sent to Royal Ascot where he started at odds of 10/1 for the Gold Cup over two and a half miles. The summer of 1984 was unusually hot and dry in England and the race was run on exceptionally fast ground. Gildoran overtook Karadar on the turn into the straight but was soon challenged by the six-year-old Irish runner Ore. Gildoran looked likely to be overtaken, but rallied strongly in the final furlong to win by a length from Ore in a new course record time of 4:18.81. Ridden by Cauthen and starting at odds of 9/4, Gildoran met Ore and Karadar again in the Goodwood Cup in July. Gildoran turned the race into a procession, winning very easily by eight lengths from Ore who was in turn twelve lengths clear of Karadar in third. Gildoran then attempted to complete the Stayers' Triple Crown when he started the 1/2 favourite for the Doncaster Cup. Running on softer ground than he had encountered in the summer, Gildoran finished last of the four runners behind Petrizzo, who was controversially disqualified in favour of the runner-up Wagoner. On his final appearance of the season he ran very poorly when unplaced behind Old Country in the Jockey Club Cup at Newmarket.

=== 1985: five-year-old season ===
After finishing unplaced on his debut as a five-year-old, Gildoran finished second to Longboat in the Sagaro Stakes and fourth to Destroyer in the Henry II Stakes at Sandown Park Racecourse. On 20 June, Gildoran attempted to win a second Gold Cup at Royal Ascot against a field which included Old Country, Longboat, Destroyer and Petrizzo as well as the Yorkshire Cup winner Ilium and the Grand Prix de Paris winner Yawa. Ridden by the Australian jockey Brent Thomson, Gildoran started the 5/2 joint-favourite with Old Country. He took the lead from the start and held a three length lead turning into the straight. He was strongly challenged in the closing stages by Longboat and Destroyer but stayed on strongly to win by half a length. At Goodwood in July he led for most of the way before finishing third behind Valuable Witness. He was then aimed at the Doncaster Cup but sustained a tendon injury in training and was retired from racing.

== Assessment ==
The independent Timeform organisation gave Gildoran a peak rating of 123 in 1984: he was rated 117 in 1983 and 1985. In 1984 he was named Champion Stayer by Gilbey Racing.

In their book A Century of Champions, based on a modified version of the Timeform system, John Randall and Tony Morris rated Gildoran as a "poor" winner of the Gold Cup.

== Stud record ==
Gildoran was retired from racing to become a breeding stallion. He had little success a sire of winners on the flat, but did produce several good National Hunt horses including Well Ridden (Arkle Novice Chase) and Macs Gildoran (Johnstown Novice Hurdle).

== Pedigree ==
Pedigree of Gildoran (IRE), bay, 1980
Sire Rheingold (IRE) 1969	Faberge (FR); 1961	Princely Gift	Nasrullah
Sire Rheingold (IRE) 1969	Faberge (FR); 1961	Princely Gift	Blue Gem
Sire Rheingold (IRE) 1969	Faberge (FR); 1961	Spring Offensive	Legend of France
Sire Rheingold (IRE) 1969	Faberge (FR); 1961	Spring Offensive	Batika
Sire Rheingold (IRE) 1969	Athene (GB); 1960	Supreme Court	Precipitation
Sire Rheingold (IRE) 1969	Athene (GB); 1960	Supreme Court	Forecourt
Sire Rheingold (IRE) 1969	Athene (GB); 1960	Necelia	Nearco
Sire Rheingold (IRE) 1969	Athene (GB); 1960	Necelia	Cecily
Dam Durtal (IRE) 1974	Lyphard (USA); 1969	Northern Dancer	Nearctic
Dam Durtal (IRE) 1974	Lyphard (USA); 1969	Northern Dancer	Natalma
Dam Durtal (IRE) 1974	Lyphard (USA); 1969	Goofed	Court Martial
Dam Durtal (IRE) 1974	Lyphard (USA); 1969	Goofed	Barra
Dam Durtal (IRE) 1974	Derna (FR); 1961	Sunny Boy	Jock
Dam Durtal (IRE) 1974	Derna (FR); 1961	Sunny Boy	Fille de Soleil
Dam Durtal (IRE) 1974	Derna (FR); 1961	Miss Barberie	Norseman
Dam Durtal (IRE) 1974	Derna (FR); 1961	Miss Barberie	Vaneuse (Family 16-c)
