= Cozzene =

American-bred Thoroughbred racehorse

- Sire: Caro
- Grandsire: Fortino
- Dam: Ride the Trails
- Damsire: Prince John
- Sex: Stallion
- Foaled: 1980
- Died: 2008
- Country: United States
- Colour: Gray
- Breeder: John A. Nerud
- Owner: John A. Nerud
- Trainer: Jan H. Nerud
- Record: 24: 10-5-5
- Earnings: $978,152

Major wins
- Cliff Hanger Handicap (1984); Longfellow Handicap (1985); Oceanport Handicap (1985); Breeders' Cup wins: Breeders' Cup Mile (1985)

Awards
- American Champion Male Turf Horse (1985)
- Last updated on September 14, 2008

Cozzene (May 8, 1980 – October 7, 2008) was an American Champion Thoroughbred racehorse and outstanding sire. He was bred and raced by U.S. Racing Hall of Fame inductee John A. Nerud and trained by his son, Jan.

Cozzene began racing at age three, winning three of six starts. At age four he won three more races from ten starts and ran third in the Breeders' Cup Mile. In 1985, the then five-year-old Cozzene had his best year in racing with wins in won four of eight starts. The previous year, in the inaugural running of the Breeders' Cup Mile at Hollywood Park Racetrack, Cozzene had finished third but came back to win the November 2, 1985 edition at Aqueduct Racetrack . His 1985 performances earned him the 1985 Eclipse Award for American Champion Male Turf Horse.

== Stallion Career ==
Retired to stud duty, in 1996 Cozzene was the Leading sire in North America and in 2002 the Leading International Sire. He stands at Gainesway Farm in Lexington, Kentucky. During his career he has sired thirty-one graded stakes winners and fourteen millionaires including:

- Cozzene's Prince (b. 1987) - millionaire 1993 Canadian Champion Older Male Horse
- Fearless Revival (b. 1987) - Dam of Pivotal
- Star of Cozzene (b. 1988) - multiple Grade 1 winner and earner of more than $2.3 million
- Environment Friend (b. 1988) - English Champion, winner of Eclipse Stakes
- Tikkanen (b. 1991) - won Breeders' Cup Turf, earner of more than $1.5 million
- Alphabet Soup (b. 1991) - won 1996 Breeders' Cup Classic, earned more than $2.9 million
- Eishin Berlin (b. 1992) - earner of more than $3.5 million in Japan
- Chorwon (b. 1993) - millionaire, won three straight runnings of the Louisville Handicap
- Admire Cozzene (b. 1996) - earner of more than $3.1 million and champion in Japan
- Zoftig (b.1997) - Winner of the Selene Stakes
- Star Over The Bay (b. 1998) - multiple stakes winner of $917,353
- Mizzen Mast (b.1998) - winner of the Malibu Stakes, Strub Stakes, and Prix de Guiche

=== Sire Sons ===
Cozzene is the grandsire of several graded stakes winners via his sons. They include:

- Mizzen Mast (b.1998) is the sire of the following Grade I winners:
  - Mizdirection - Twice winner of the Breeders' Cup Turf Sprint
  - Caravel - Winner of the Breeders' Cup Turf Sprint
  - Mast Track - Winner of the Hollywood Gold Cup Stakes
  - Flotilla - Winner of the Breeders' Cup Juvenile Fillies Turf and Poule d'Essai des Pouliches
  - Lighthouse - Winner of the Coolmore Classic
  - Sailor's Valentine - Winner of the Ashland Stakes
  - Full Mast - Winner of the Prix Jean-Luc Lagardère
  - Midships - Winner of the Charles Whittingham Stakes
  - Ultimate Eagle - Winner of the Hollywood Derby
- Alphabet Soup (b.1991)
  - Alphabet Kisses - Winner of the La Brea Stakes
  - Egg Drop - Winner of the Matriarch Stakes
  - Our New Recruit - Winner of the Dubai Golden Shaheen
  - Alpha Bettor - Canadian Champion Older Male Horse
  - Phantom Light - Canadian Champion Older Male Horse
- Admire Cozzene (b.1996)
  - Aston Machan - Winner of the Sprinters Stakes
  - Snow Dragon - Winner of the Sprinters Stakes

== Death ==
Cozzene was euthanized on October 7, 2008 at Gainesway Farm in Kentucky. The stallion had had melanoma, a disease many gray horses get, for years but it had not caused him any pain until recently.

== Pedigree ==
Pedigree of Cozzene, gray stallion, May 8, 1980
Sire Caro (IRE) gray 1967	Fortino II (FR) gray 1959	Grey Sovereign (GB)	Nasrullah
Sire Caro (IRE) gray 1967	Fortino II (FR) gray 1959	Grey Sovereign (GB)	Kong (GB)
Sire Caro (IRE) gray 1967	Fortino II (FR) gray 1959	Ranavalo II (FR)	Relic
Sire Caro (IRE) gray 1967	Fortino II (FR) gray 1959	Ranavalo II (FR)	Navarra (ITY)
Sire Caro (IRE) gray 1967	Chambord chestnut 1955	Chamossaire (GB)	Precipitation (GB)
Sire Caro (IRE) gray 1967	Chambord chestnut 1955	Chamossaire (GB)	Snowberry (GB)
Sire Caro (IRE) gray 1967	Chambord chestnut 1955	Life Hill	Solario (GB)
Sire Caro (IRE) gray 1967	Chambord chestnut 1955	Life Hill	Lady of the Snows (GB)
Dam Ride the Trails bay 1971	Prince John chestnut 1953	Princequillo	Prince Rose (GB)
Dam Ride the Trails bay 1971	Prince John chestnut 1953	Princequillo	Cosquilla
Dam Ride the Trails bay 1971	Prince John chestnut 1953	Not Afraid	Count Fleet
Dam Ride the Trails bay 1971	Prince John chestnut 1953	Not Afraid	Banish Fear
Dam Ride the Trails bay 1971	Wildwook bay 1965	Sir Gaylord	Turn-To
Dam Ride the Trails bay 1971	Wildwook bay 1965	Sir Gaylord	Somethingroyal
Dam Ride the Trails bay 1971	Wildwook bay 1965	Blue Canoe	Jet Pilot
Dam Ride the Trails bay 1971	Wildwook bay 1965	Blue Canoe	Portage (family 4-m)
