= Durtal (horse) =

Irish-bred Thoroughbred racehorse

- Sire: Lyphard
- Grandsire: Northern Dancer
- Dam: Derna
- Damsire: Sunny Boy
- Sex: Mare
- Foaled: 9 April 1974
- Country: Ireland
- Colour: Bay
- Breeder: Societe Aland
- Owner: Robert Sangster
- Trainer: Barry Hills
- Record: 8:4-3-1

Major wins
- Rose of Lancaster Stakes (1976); Cheveley Park Stakes (1976); Fred Darling Stakes (1977)

Awards
- Timeform rating 120 (1976), 121 (1977); Top-rated British two-year-old filly (1976)

Durtal (9 April 1974 – 1996) was an Irish-bred, British-trained Thoroughbred racehorse and broodmare. She was the best British-trained two-year-old filly of 1976 when she won three of her five races including the Cheveley Park Stakes, and finished second in both the Lowther Stakes and the Champagne Stakes. In the following year she won the Fred Darling Stakes and finished second in the Poule d'Essai des Pouliches before being injured shortly before the start of the Oaks Stakes, a race for which she had been favourite. After one more race she was retired from racing and became a successful broodmare, producing the dual Ascot Gold Cup winner Gildoran and the Royal Hunt Cup winner True Panache.

== Background ==
Durtal was a bay mare with a white blaze and three white socks bred in Ireland by Ecurie Aland, a breeding operation owned by the Head family. She was from the first crop of foals sired by Lyphard, an American-bred stallion who raced in France, winning the Prix Jacques Le Marois and Prix de la Forêt in 1972. Lyphard went on to become a very successful breeding stallion in both Europe and North America, siring Three Troikas, Dancing Brave and Manila. Durtal's dam Derna, failed to win a race, but was a highly successful broodmare who had already produced Valderna, the grand-dam of Zabeel and later produced the Prix de l'Arc de Triomphe winner Detroit.

As a yearling, Durtal was sent to the sales and bought for ₣145,000 by the British businessman Robert Sangster, the filly was sent into training with Barry Hills at Lambourn in Berkshire. The filly was named after Durtal, a commune in the Maine-et-Loire department in western France.

== Racing career ==
=== 1976: two-year-old season ===
Durtal began her racing career in a maiden race over five furlongs at Newcastle Racecourse in June and won by four lengths from Hand Canter. Only one horse, a filly named Grain of Truth, opposed Durtal when she ran in the Rose of Lancaster Stakes over six furlongs at Haydock Park Racecourse. She won easily by seven lengths, staying on so strongly that her jockey had great difficulty pulling her up after the finish. At York Racecourse in August, Durtal was moved up in class to contest the Lowther Stakes. The field split into two groups, and although Durtal finished ahead of the stands side group (on the right-hand side from the jockeys' viewpoint) she was beaten half a length by Icena, who was racing on the opposite side of the course.

In September, Durtal was moved up in distance and matched against colts in the Champagne Stakes over seven furlongs at Doncaster Racecourse. After setting the early pace she proved no match for the colt J O Tobin, who beat her by four lengths, but she finished seven lengths clear of the other runners. At Newmarket Racecourse in October, Durtal, ridden by Lester Piggott started at odds of 5/1 for the Cheveley Park Stakes, then the only Group One race of the season in the United Kingdom restricted to two-year-old fillies. The French-trained Haneena, disqualified after winning the Prix d'Arenberg, started favourite, whilst the other leading contenders included Regal Ray (Moyglare Stud Stakes), Be Easy (Molecomb Stakes) and Piney Ridge (National Stakes). Piggott sent Durtal into the lead from the start and she was never seriously challenged, winning by three lengths and two lengths from Be Easy and Rings, with Haneena in fourth.

=== 1977: three-year-old season ===
On her three-year-old debut, Durtal started 8/13 favourite for the Fred Darling Stakes over seven furlongs at Newbury Racecourse. She was restrained by Piggott until the final quarter mile when she went to the front and quickly went clear of her rivals to win impressively by five lengths from Miss Pinkie. Timeform described her win as "one of the most impressive performances we saw all year". Durtal did not run in the 1000 Guineas, being aimed instead at the French equivalent, the Poule d'Essai des Pouliches over 1600 metres at Longchamp Racecourse, a race which offered a large bonus for horses bred by French-based breeders. Durtal turned into the straight in fifth place before moving up to take the lead but was overtaken in the closing stages by Madelia and dead-heated with Beaune for second place, three lengths behind the winner.

At Epsom Downs Racecourse, Durtal was made favourite for the 199th running of the Oaks over one and a half miles. Durtal appeared agitated in the paddock, and on moving onto the racecourse she bolted and her saddle slipped sideways. Piggott was unseated after being "hung up" by the stirrup and the filly crashed into a rail sustaining injuries which necessitated her withdrawal from the race, which was won in her absence by Dunfermline. Durtal never fully recovered from her injuries, and in her only subsequent appearance she finished last of the three runners behind Noirima and No Cards in the Marlborough House Stakes over one mile at Ascot Racecourse in October.

== Assessment ==
There was no International Classification of European two-year-olds in 1976: the official handicappers of Britain, Ireland and France compiled separate rankings for horses which competed in those countries. In the British Free Handicap, Durtal was allotted a weight of 120 pounds, making her the best filly of the season, thirteen pounds behind the top colt J O Tobin. The independent Timeform organisation gave her a rating of 120, ten pounds behind the Irish-trained filly Cloonlara. In their annual Racehorses of 1976 Timeform described her as "sure to figure prominently in the classics, especially the Oaks". In the following year, Durtal was given a rating of 121 by Timeform, twelve pounds below their top three-year-old filly Dunfermline. In the official International Classification, Durtal was rated eight pounds behind the leading three-year-old fillies Dunfermline and Madelia.

== Breeding career ==
Durtal produced at least eleven foals between 1980 and 1995:

- Gildoran (bay colt, foaled in 1980, sired by Rheingold), won seven races including the Ascot Gold Cup in 1984 and 1985
- Well Defined (chestnut filly, 1982, by Hello Gorgeous)
- Follies Bergeres (bay filly, 1984, by Pas de Seul), failed to win in England, later a broodmare in Australia and New Zealand
- True Panache (bay colt, 1985, by Mr. Prospector), won the Royal Hunt Cup in 1989
- Warring Nations (bay colt, 1986, by Seattle Slew), failed to win in six races
- Regimental Arms (bay colt, 1987, by Sir Ivor), won one race
- Lady Isis (brown filly, 1988, by Riverman), won one race
- River Defences (bay colt, 1989, by Riverman), won one race
- Porte des Iles (chestnut filly, 1991, by Kris), failed to win in eight races
- Chalamont (chestnut filly, 1993, by Kris), won two races, grand-dam of Roderic O'Connor, and Lake Forest (Golden Eagle).
- Charroux (bay filly, 1995, by Darshaan) failed to win in three races – dam of winners

== Pedigree ==
Pedigree of Durtal, bay mare, 1974
Sire Lyphard (USA) 1969	Northern Dancer (CAN); 1961	Nearctic	Nearco
Sire Lyphard (USA) 1969	Northern Dancer (CAN); 1961	Nearctic	Lady Angela
Sire Lyphard (USA) 1969	Northern Dancer (CAN); 1961	Natalma	Native Dancer
Sire Lyphard (USA) 1969	Northern Dancer (CAN); 1961	Natalma	Almahmoud
Sire Lyphard (USA) 1969	Goofed (USA); 1960	Court Martial	Fair Trial
Sire Lyphard (USA) 1969	Goofed (USA); 1960	Court Martial	Instantaneous
Sire Lyphard (USA) 1969	Goofed (USA); 1960	Barra	Formor
Sire Lyphard (USA) 1969	Goofed (USA); 1960	Barra	La Favorite
Dam Derna (FR) 1961	Sunny Boy (FR); 1944	Jock	Asterus
Dam Derna (FR) 1961	Sunny Boy (FR); 1944	Jock	Naic
Dam Derna (FR) 1961	Sunny Boy (FR); 1944	Fille de Soleil	Solario
Dam Derna (FR) 1961	Sunny Boy (FR); 1944	Fille de Soleil	Fille de Salut
Dam Derna (FR) 1961	Miss Barberie (FR); 1950	Norseman	Umidwar
Dam Derna (FR) 1961	Miss Barberie (FR); 1950	Norseman	Tara
Dam Derna (FR) 1961	Miss Barberie (FR); 1950	Vaneuse	Vatellor
Dam Derna (FR) 1961	Miss Barberie (FR); 1950	Vaneuse	Diseuse (Family 16-c)
