= Mrs McArdy =

British-bred Thoroughbred racehorse

- Sire: Tribal Chief
- Grandsire: Princely Gift
- Dam: Hanina
- Damsire: Darling Boy
- Sex: Mare
- Foaled: 1974
- Country: United Kingdom
- Colour: Bay
- Breeder: Lord Grimthorpe
- Owner: Edith Kettlewell
- Trainer: Mick Easterby
- Record: 16:8-0-1 (in Europe)

Major wins
- Tote Free Handicap (1977); 1000 Guineas (1977); Fen Ditton Stakes (1977); Strensall Stakes (1977)

Awards
- Timeform rating 101 (1976), 123 (1977)

Mrs McArdy (1974 – 5 August 1991) was a British Thoroughbred racehorse and broodmare best known for winning the classic 1000 Guineas in 1977. She won four minor races as a two-year-old in 1977 before emerging as a top-class performer in the following year. As a three-year-old, she won the Tote Free Handicap before winning the Guineas as a 16/1 outsider. She went on to win the Fen Ditton Stakes when conceding weight to colts and older horses and then took the Strensall Stakes. She was exported to race in the United States but failed to reproduce her European form. After her retirement from racing, she had some success as a broodmare.

== Background ==
Mrs McArdy was a "shapely, attractive" bay mare with a large white star bred by Christopher Beckett, 4th Baron Grimthorpe, at his Westow Hall stud near York. She was arguably the best horse sired by Tribal Chief, a sprinter who won the New Stakes and the Norfolk Stakes as a two-year-old in 1969. Her dam, Hanina, was a poor racehorse but was a granddaughter of Star of India, the outstanding British two-year-old of 1955.

In 1975, Lord Grimthorpe sold all his bloodstock, with most being bought by trainer Mick Easterby. Easterby sold the horses on but kept Mrs McArdy and trained at her at his farm near Sheriff Hutton in Yorkshire. He later sold the filly privately to Edith Kettlewell, the wife of a hotelier.

== Racing career ==
=== 1976: two-year-old season ===
Campaigned exclusively in the North of England, Mrs McArdy made little impact in the earliest part of her racing career, finishing unplaced in her first four races before winning a maiden race over five furlongs at Newcastle Racecourse. She then made steady improvement, winning a nursery handicap race over six furlongs at Thirsk and the Prince of Wales's Nursery over a mile at Doncaster, receiving fifteen pounds from the runner-up, Fair Season. On her final appearance of the season, she took her winning run to four with a victory in a minor race over six furlongs at Redcar Racecourse in September, beating Sarasingh by three quarters of a length.

=== 1977: three-year-old season ===
On her first appearance as a three-year-old, Mrs McArdy finished unplaced in the seven furlong Tote Spring Handicap at Doncaster in March. She began to show good form in training gallops, however, and was strongly fancied when she ran in the Tote Free Handicap at Newmarket Racecourse in April. Carrying 112 pounds and ridden by the lightweight jockey Taffy Thomas, she won by two and a half lengths from the colts Baudelaire and Brighthelmstone. Two weeks later, Mrs McArdy, ridden by Eddie Hide, started at odds of 16/1 for the 165th running of the 1000 Guineas over the Rowley Mile course at Newmarket. Cloonlara, the leading two-year-old filly of 1976, started 6/4 favourite, with the other leading contenders appearing to be Freeze The Secret, Sanedtki, Flota Armada, River Dane, Icena, Miss Pinkie, and Danseuse Etoile. Durtal, regarded as the best British filly of her generation, was withdrawn on the eve of the race. Hide tracked Cloonlara before sending Mrs McArdy into the lead two furlongs from the finish. Mrs McArdy established a decisive advantage and was never seriously challenged in the closing stages, winning by two lengths from Freeze The Secret, with Sanedtki narrowly beating Cloonlara for third.

Mrs McArdy was then moved up in distance to contest the Oaks Stakes over one and a half mile at Epsom Downs Racecourse in June. As she was the daughter of a sprinter, there was serious doubt about her ability to stay the distance. She was in contention until early in the straight but then rapidly faded and finished thirteenth of the fourteen runners behind Dunfermline. Unusually for a British classic winner, Mrs McArdy was then asked to concede weight to colts and older horses in a handicap race (the Fen Ditton Stakes) over a mile at Newmarket in July. Carrying 133 pounds, she took the lead approaching the final furlong and won by two and a half lengths. Timeform described her performance as "a striking achievement". Mrs McArdy became agitated before the start of the Sussex Stakes at Goodwood Racecourse and failed to reproduce her best form, finishing sixth behind Artaius. In August, the filly was assigned top weight in the Strensall Stakes over seven furlongs at York Racecourse. She took the lead two furlongs from the finish and won by a length and a half from the Molecomb Stakes winner Be Easy, despite being eased down by Eddie Hide in the closing stages. On her final appearance of the season, she finished third to Boldboy in the Sanyo Stakes over seven furlongs at Doncaster in September.

== Later career ==
In December 1977, Mrs McArdy was sent to the Tattersalls horses-in-training sale and was bought for 154,000 guineas by Bertram R. Firestone and exported to race in the United States. The price was a record for the sale.

Mrs McArdy ran five times in North America, failing to win and finishing second once before being retired from racing.

== Assessment ==
In 1976, the independent Timeform organisation gave Mrs McArdy a rating of 103, twenty-seven pounds below their top-rated two-year-old filly, Cloonlara. In the Free Handicap, a rating of the best two-year-olds to race in Britain in 1976, the filly was assigned a weight of 105 pounds, 28 pounds below the top colt, J. O. Tobin, and fifteen pounds below the leading filly, Durtal. In the following year, she was given a rating of 123 by Timeform, fourteen pound behind their top-rated horse, Alleged, and ten pounds below their leading three-year-old filly, Dunfermline. In the official International Classification for three-year-olds, she was rated thirteen pounds behind Alleged and five pounds inferior to leading fillies Dunfermline and Madelia.

In their book A Century of Champions, based on the Timeform rating system, John Randall and Tony Morris rated Mrs McArdy an "average" winner of the 1000 Guineas.

== Breeding record ==
Mrs McArdy was based as a broodmare in Europe for several years before being exported to Japan. She died at the Taiki Farm in Japan on 5 August 1991. Her progeny included:

- Rising Spirits (chestnut filly, 1985, by Cure the Blues), won once as a two-year-old, dam of Gino's Spirits (Noble Damsel Handicap)
- Citidancer (brown colt, 1986, by Lomond), won five races including two at Group Three level, runner-up in the Irish Champion Stakes
- Golden Coast (colt, 1988 by Ahonoora), won one race
- Lady President (brown mare, 1989, by Dominion), won two races
- Admire McArdy (chestnut filly, 1991, by Northern Taste), unraced, dam of Admire Cozzene (Yasuda Kinen)

== Pedigree ==
Pedigree of Mrs McArdy (GB), bay mare, 1974
Sire Tribal Chief (GB) 1967	Princely Gift (GB); 1951	Nasrullah	Nearco
Sire Tribal Chief (GB) 1967	Princely Gift (GB); 1951	Nasrullah	Mumtaz Begum
Sire Tribal Chief (GB) 1967	Princely Gift (GB); 1951	Blue Gem	Blue Peter
Sire Tribal Chief (GB) 1967	Princely Gift (GB); 1951	Blue Gem	Sparkle
Sire Tribal Chief (GB) 1967	Mwanza (GB); 1961	Petition	Fair Trial
Sire Tribal Chief (GB) 1967	Mwanza (GB); 1961	Petition	Art Paper
Sire Tribal Chief (GB) 1967	Mwanza (GB); 1961	Lake Tanganyika	Ujiji
Sire Tribal Chief (GB) 1967	Mwanza (GB); 1961	Lake Tanganyika	Blue Girl
Dam Hanina (GB) 1965	Darling Boy (GB); 1958	Darius	Dante
Dam Hanina (GB) 1965	Darling Boy (GB); 1958	Darius	Yasna
Dam Hanina (GB) 1965	Darling Boy (GB); 1958	Sugar Bun	Mahmoud
Dam Hanina (GB) 1965	Darling Boy (GB); 1958	Sugar Bun	Galatea
Dam Hanina (GB) 1965	Blue Sash (GB); 1958	Djebe	Djebel
Dam Hanina (GB) 1965	Blue Sash (GB); 1958	Djebe	Catherine
Dam Hanina (GB) 1965	Blue Sash (GB); 1958	Star of India	Court Martial
Dam Hanina (GB) 1965	Blue Sash (GB); 1958	Star of India	Eastern Grandeur (Family: 14-b)
