= Hankyu Hai =

Hankyu Hai 阪急杯
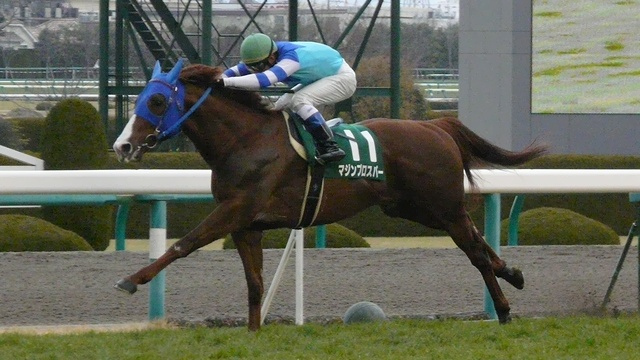
- Majin Prosper wins the 2012 Hankyu Hai
- Class: Grade 3
- Location: Hanshin Racecourse
- Inaugurated: 1957
- Race type: Thoroughbred Flat racing

Race information
- Distance: 1400 metres
- Surface: Turf
- Track: Right-handed
- Qualification: 4-y-o+
- Weight: 56 kg
- Purse: ¥ 92,980,000 (as of 2026): 1st: ¥ 43,000,000; 2nd: ¥ 17,000,000; 3rd: ¥ 11,000,000

The Hankyu Hai (Japanese 阪急杯) is a Grade 3 horse race for Thoroughbreds aged four and over, run in February over a distance of 1400 metres on turf at Hanshin Racecourse. The race serves as a trial for the Takamatsunomiya Kinen, which is run in late March. Since 2014, the winner of the race is given a slot of entry for the Takamatsunomiya Kinen.

The Hankyu Hai was first run in 1957 and has held Grade 3 status since 1984. The race was run at Kyoto Racecourse in 1959, 1966, 1969, 1991 and 1995. It was run over a variety of distances before being run over 1400 metres for the first time in 1981: it was run over 1200 metres from 1996 to 2005.

== Weight ==
57 kg for four-year-olds and above.

Allowances:

- 2 kg for fillies / mares
- 1 kg for southern hemisphere bred three-year-olds

Penalties (excluding two-year-old race performance):

- If a graded stakes race has been won within a year:
  - 2 kg for a grade 1 win (1 kg for fillies / mares)
  - 1 kg for a grade 2 win
- If a graded stakes race has been won for more than a year:
  - 1 kg for a grade1 win

== Winners since 2000 ==
Year	Winner	Age	Jockey	Trainer	Owner	Time
2000	Black Hawk	6	Norihiro Yokoyama	Sakae Kunieda	Makoto Kaneko	1:08.7
2001	Daitaku Yamato	7	Mirco Demuro	Sei Ishizaka	Taiyo Farm	1:08.7
2002	Admire Cozzene	6	Hiroki Goto	Mitsuru Hashida	Riichi Kondo	1:07.9
2003	Shonan Kampf	5	Shinji Fujita	Yokichi Okubo	Tetsuhide Kunimoto	1:08.5
2004	Sunningdale	5	Minoru Yoshida	Tsutomu Setoguchi	Shigeki Goto	1:08.5
2005	Keeneland Swan	6	Hirofumi Shii	Hideyuki Mori	Toyomitsu Hirai	1:08.5
2006	Blue Shotgun	7	Mikio Matsunaga	Kohei Take	Ogifushi Racing Club	1:22.5
2007	Precise Machine (DH)	8	Katsumi Ando	Kiyoshi Hagiwara	Seiichi Iketani	1:20.5
2007	Eishin Dover (DH)	5	Hideaki Miyuki	Ken Kozaki	Toyomitsu Hirai	1:20.5
2008	Laurel Guerreiro	4	Hirofumi Shii	Mitsugu Kon	Laurel Racing	1:20.7
2009	B B Guldan	5	Katsumi Ando	Masazo Ryoke	Bando Farm	1:21.1
2010	A Shin Forward	5	Yasunari Iwata	Masato Nihizono	Eishindo	1:21.4
2011	San Carlo	5	Yutaka Yoshida	Yokichi Okubo	Shadai Race Horse	1:20.1
2012	Majin Prosper	5	Suguru Hamanaka	Hidemasa Nakao	Kazuhiro Sasaki	1:22.0
2013	Lord Kanaloa	5	Yasunari Iwata	Takayuki Yasuda	Lord Horse Club	1:21.0
2014	Copano Richard	4	Suguru Hamanaka	Toru Miya	Sachiaki Kobayashi	1:20.7
2015	Daiwa Maggiore	6	Mirco Demuro	Yoshito Yahagi	Keizo Oshiro	1:23.8
2016	Mikki Isle	5	Kohei Matsuyama	Hidetaka Otonashi	Mizuki Noda	1:19.9
2017	Talking Drum	7	Hideaki Miyuki	Makoto Saito	Michiko Shimokobe	1:21.4
2018	Diana Halo	5	Yutaka Take	Nobuharu Fukushima	Komahide	1:20.1
2019	Smart Odin	6	Yusuke Fujioka	Yasutoshi Ikee	Toru Okawa	1:20.3
2020	Best Actor	6	Suguru Hamanaka	Yuichi Shikato	Shadai Race Horse	1:20.3
2021	Resistencia	4	Yuichi Kitamura	Takeshi Matsushita	Carrot Farm	1:19.2
2022	Diatonic	7	Yasunari Iwata	Takayuki Yasuda	Silk	1:19.9
2023	Aguri	4	Kazuo Yokoyama	Takayuki Yasuda	Masahiro Miki	1:19.5
2024	Win Marvel	5	Kohei Matsuyama	Masashi Fukayama	Win	1:21.2
2025 (Note: The race was contested at Kyoto Racecourse due to renovations at Hanshin Racecourse)	Kangchenjunga	5	Hideaki Miyuki	Yasushi Shono	Masanobu Habata	1:21.7
2026	Sonshi	5	Yuga Kawada	Mitsumasa Nakauchida	Susumu Fujita	1:18.9 (Note: Set the current track record)

== Earlier winners ==
- 1957 - Takakura O
- 1958 - Yamanin
- 1959 - Homare Ryu
- 1960 - Minshu
- 1961 - Caesar
- 1962 - Miss Keiko
- 1963 - Gokai
- 1964 - Passport
- 1965 - Ballymoss Nisei
- 1966 - Hatsurai O
- 1967 - Nihon Pillow Ace
- 1968 - Apo Onward
- 1969 - Takano Kinen
- 1970 - Hirozuki
- 1971 - Tomei
- 1972 - Fast Bamboo
- 1973 - Sakae Kaho
- 1974 - Keiryu Shingeki
- 1975 - Silver Nero
- 1976 - Yamanin Faber
- 1977 - Center Good
- 1978 - Three Fire
- 1979 - Lead Swallow
- 1980 - Teruno Eight
- 1981 - Satsuki Rainbow
- 1982 - Bambton Harley
- 1983 - Happy Progress
- 1984 - Gouache Out
- 1985 - Shadai Sophia
- 1986 - Long Hayabusa
- 1987 - St Caesar
- 1988 - Sankin Hayate
- 1989 - Horino Raiden
- 1990 - Senryo Yakusha
- 1991 - Jo Roaring
- 1992 - Hokusei Ciboulette
- 1993 - Legacy Field
- 1994 - Gold Mountain
- 1995 - Bodyguard
- 1996 - Towa Winner
- 1997 - Shinko Forest
- 1998 - Masa Lucky
- 1999 - Kyoei March

== See also ==
- Horse racing in Japan
- List of Japanese flat horse races
