= Rheingold (horse) =

Irish-bred Thoroughbred racehorse

- Racing silks of Henry K. Zeisel
- Sire: Faberge
- Grandsire: Princely Gift
- Dam: Athene III
- Damsire: Supreme Court
- Sex: Stallion
- Foaled: 1969
- Country: Ireland
- Colour: Bay
- Breeder: Dr. James Russell
- Owner: Henry K. Zeisel. Racing silks: Royal blue, gold sash and sleeves.
- Trainer: Barry Hills
- Record: 17: 9-4-1
- Earnings: US$901,099 (equivalent)

Major wins
- Dante Stakes (1972); Grand Prix de Saint-Cloud (1972 & 1973); Prix Ganay (1973); Hardwicke Stakes (1973); John Porter Stakes (1973); Grand Prix Prince Rose (1973); Prix de l'Arc de Triomphe (1973)

Awards
- Timeform rating: 137
- Last updated on February 9, 2007

Rheingold (1969–1990) was an Irish Thoroughbred racehorse best known as the winner of France's most prestigious race, the Prix de l'Arc de Triomphe.

== Background ==
A descendant of the extremely important sire Nearco through both his sire and his dam, Rheingold showed promise racing at age two when he finished second in the 1971 Champagne and Dewhurst Stakes. He was bred by Dr. James Russell at Bansha Castle, County Tipperary in Ireland.

== Racing career ==
In 1972, Rheingold was beaten a short head by Roberto in The Derby. He then won the Grand Prix de Saint-Cloud against older horses and finished fourth in the inaugural Benson & Hedges Gold Cup in which Roberto beat the celebrated Brigadier Gerard. The following year, Rheingold won the Prix Ganay, and finished second in the King George VI and Queen Elizabeth Stakes to the great French filly, Dahlia. He won his second straight Grand Prix de Saint-Cloud under jockey Yves Saint-Martin and in the autumn defeated the future French Horse Racing Hall of Fame filly Allez France to win the Prix de l'Arc de Triomphe under Lester Piggott, who was winning the race for the first time.

== Stud record ==
Rheingold was retired after the 1973 racing season and stood at stud in Ireland from 1974 to 1979. Among his progeny, he was the sire of two-time Ascot Gold Cup winner, Gildoran and Noir et Or whose wins included the Grade I Grand Prix Prince Rose and Prix du Conseil de Paris.

In 1980 Rheingold was sold to a Japanese breeding operation where he died in 1990.
