= Sprinters Stakes =

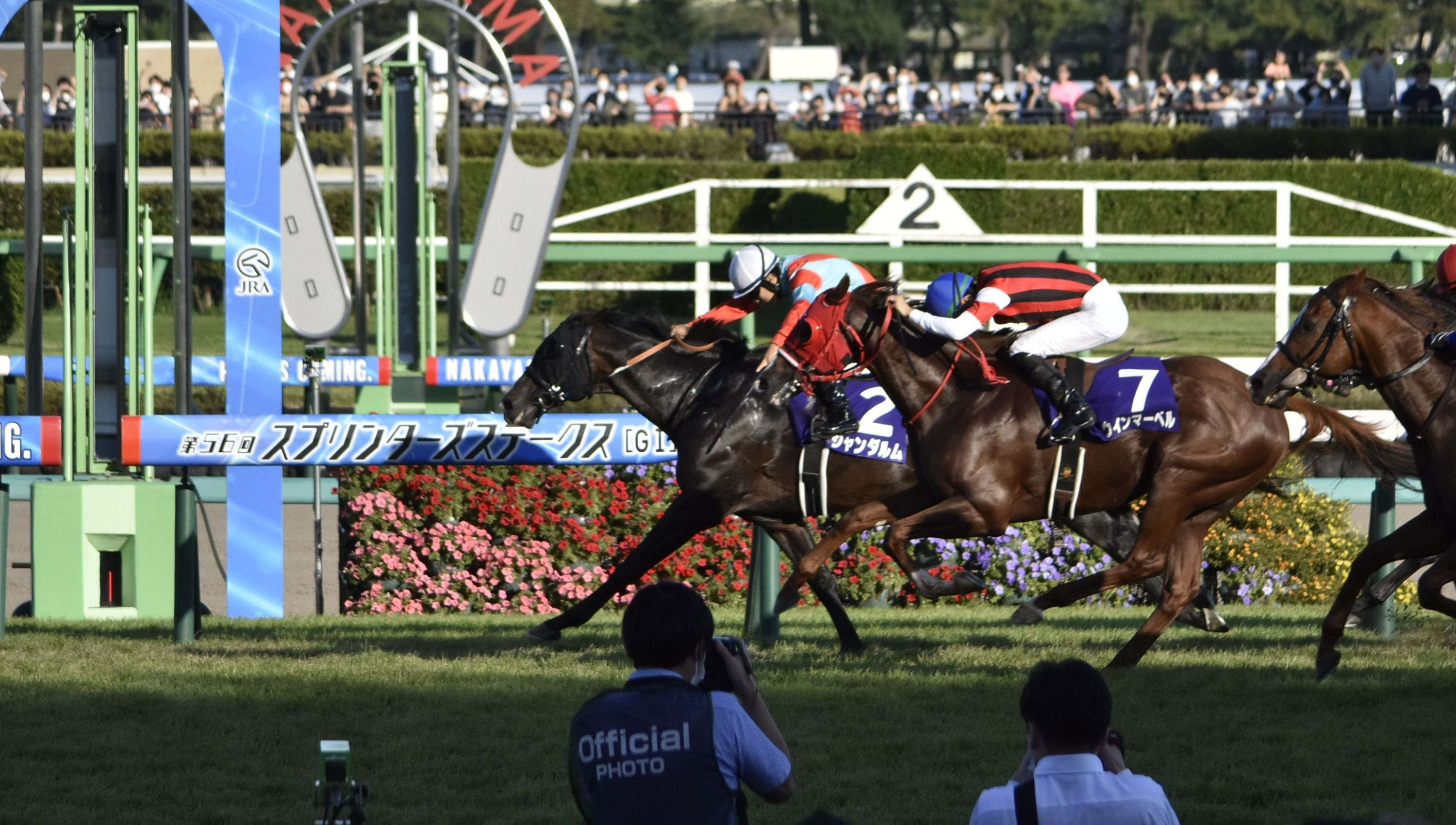
- 2022 Sprinters Stakes winner Gendarme
- Class: Grade 1
- Location: Nakayama Racecourse; 2002 & 2014: Niigata Racecourse
- Inaugurated: July 9, 1967
- Race type: Thoroughbred
- Website: japanracing.jp - Centaur Stakes & Sprinters Stakes

Race information
- Distance: 1,200 meters (About 6 furlongs)
- Record: 1:06.7, Lord Kanaloa (2012)
- Surface: Turf
- Track: Right-handed; 2002 & 2014: Left-handed
- Qualification: 3-y-o+, Thoroughbreds
- Weight: 3-y-o 56 kg / 4-y-o+ 58 kg Allowance: Fillies 2 kg
- Purse: ¥ 367,700,000 (as of 2024): 1st: ¥ 170,000,000; 2nd: ¥ 68,000,000; 3rd: ¥ 43,000,000
- Bonuses: see Global Sprint Challenge

The Sprinters Stakes (スプリンターズステークス) is a Grade 1 flat horse race in Japan open to thoroughbreds which are three-years-old or above. It is run over a distance of 1,200 metres (approximately 6 furlongs) at Nakayama Racecourse, and it takes place annually in late September or early October.

It was first run in 1967, and was given Domestic Grade 3 status when race grading was introduced to Japan in 1984. This was elevated to Domestic Grade 2 in 1987, Domestic Grade 1 in 1990, and to its present level in 2006. Horses trained outside Japan have been eligible to run in the race since 1994. Prior to 2000 the race was run in December, the week before the Arima Kinen (Grand Prix).

It is now the seventh leg in the ten-race Global Sprint Challenge series, preceded by the July Cup in Britain and followed by The Age Classic in Australia.

The 2014 running of the Sprinters Stakes was held at Niigata Racecourse, since Nakayama Racecourse was closed for renovations to the grandstand. The race was previously held in Niigata in 2002.

== Trial races ==
Trial races provide automatic berths to the winning horses.

| Race | Grade | Racecourse | Distance | Condition |
|---|---|---|---|---|
| Keeneland Cup | GIII | Sapporo | 1,200 metres | Winner |
| Centaur Stakes | GII | Hanshin | 1,200 metres | Winner |

== Records ==
Speed record:

- 1.06.7 – Lord Kanaloa (2012)

Most wins by a horse (2):

- Lord Kanaloa (2012, 2013)
- Red Falx (2016, 2017)
- Meiwa Kimiko (1977, 1978)
- Sakura Bakushin O (1993, 1994)
- Sakura Iwai (1974, 1975)

Most wins by a jockey (5):

- Futoshi Kojima (1974, 1975, 1980, 1993, 1994)

Most wins by a trainer (4):

- Katsutaro Sakai (1973, 1981, 1993, 1994)

Most wins by an owner (6):

- Sakura Commerce (1974, 1975, 1980, 1981, 1993, 1994)

== Winners since 1990 ==
| Year | Winner | Age | Jockey | Trainer | Owner | Time |
|---|---|---|---|---|---|---|
| 1990 | Bamboo Memory | 5 | Yutaka Take | Kunihiko Take | Shinichi Takeda | 1:07.8 |
| 1991 | Daiichi Ruby | 4 | Hiroshi Kawachi | Yuji Ito | Haruo Tsujimoto | 1:07.6 |
| 1992 | Nishino Flower | 3 | Hiroshi Kawachi | Masahiro Matsuda | Masayuki Nishiyama | 1:07.7 |
| 1993 | Sakura Bakushin O | 4 | Futoshi Kojima | Katsutaro Sakai | Sakura Commerce | 1:07.9 |
| 1994 | Sakura Bakushin O | 5 | Futoshi Kojima | Katsutaro Sakai | Sakura Commerce | 1:07.1 |
| 1995 | Hishi Akebono | 3 | Koichi Tsunoda | Masaru Sayama | Masaichiro Abe | 1:08.1 |
| 1996 | Flower Park | 4 | Seiki Tabara | Shouichi Matsumoto | Katsumi Yoshida | 1:08.8 |
| 1997 | Taiki Shuttle | 3 | Yukio Okabe | Kazuo Fujisawa | Taiki Farm Co. | 1:07.8 |
| 1998 | Meiner Love | 3 | Yutaka Yoshida | Ryuichi Inaba | Thoroughbred Club Ruffian | 1:08.6 |
| 1999 | Black Hawk | 5 | Norihiro Yokoyama | Sakae Kunieda | Makoto Kaneko | 1:08.2 |
| 2000 | Daitaku Yamato | 6 | Teruo Eda | Sei Ishizaka | Kazuo Nakamura | 1:08.6 |
| 2001 | Trot Star | 5 | Masayoshi Ebina | Eiji Nakano | Minoru Takano | 1:07.0 |
| 2002 | Believe ^{[1]} | 4 | Yutaka Take | Shigeki Matsumoto | Koji Maeda | 1:07.7 |
| 2003 | Durandal | 4 | Kenichi Ikezoe | Masahiro Sakaguchi | Teruya Yoshida | 1:08.0 |
| 2004 | Calstone Light O | 6 | Naohiro Onishi | Hiroyuki Oneda | Sadamitsu Shimizu | 1:09.9 |
| 2005 | Silent Witness | 6 | Felix Coetzee | Tony Cruz | Archie & Betty da Silva | 1:07.3 |
| 2006 | Takeover Target | 7 | Jay Ford | Joe Janiak | Joe & Ben Janiak | 1:08.1 |
| 2007 | Aston Machan | 3 | Eiji Nakadate | Sei Ishizaka | Mayumi Tosa | 1:09.4 |
| 2008 | Sleepless Night | 4 | Hiroyuki Uemura | Kojiro Hashiguchi | Sunday Racing | 1:08.0 |
| 2009 | Laurel Guerreiro | 5 | Shinji Fujita | Mitsugu Kon | Laurel Racing | 1:07.5 |
| 2010 | Ultra Fantasy | 8 | Alex Lai Hoi-wing | Ricky Yiu Poon-fai | The Hon T F Lam | 1:07.4 |
| 2011 | Curren Chan | 4 | Kenichi Ikezoe | Takayuki Yasuda | Takashi Suzuki | 1:07.4 |
| 2012 | Lord Kanaloa | 4 | Yasunari Iwata | Takayuki Yasuda | Lord Horse Club | 1:06.7 |
| 2013 | Lord Kanaloa | 5 | Yasunari Iwata | Takayuki Yasuda | Lord Horse Club | 1:07.2 |
| 2014 | Snow Dragon ^{[1]} | 6 | Takuya Ono | Noboru Takagi | Makio Okada | 1:08.8 |
| 2015 | Straight Girl | 6 | Keita Tosaki | Hideaki Fujiwara | Hirosaki Toshihiro Hd Co Ltd | 1:08.1 |
| 2016 | Red Falx | 5 | Mirco Demuro | Tomohito Ozeki | Tokyo Horse Racing Co. Ltd | 1:07.6 |
| 2017 | Red Falx | 6 | Mirco Demuro | Tomohito Ozeki | Tokyo Horse Racing Co. Ltd | 1:07.6 |
| 2018 | Fine Needle | 5 | Yuga Kawada | Yoshitada Takahashi | Godolphin | 1:08.3 |
| 2019 | Tower Of London | 4 | Christophe Lemaire | Kazuo Fujisawa | Godolphin | 1:07.1 |
| 2020 | Gran Alegria | 4 | Christophe Lemaire | Kazuo Fujisawa | Sunday Racing | 1:08.3 |
| 2021 | Pixie Knight | 3 | Yuichi Fukunaga | Hidetaka Otonashi | Silk Racing | 1:07.1 |
| 2022 | Gendarme | 7 | Kiwamu Ogino | Yasutoshi Ikee | Koji Maeda | 1:07.8 |
| 2023 | Mama Cocha | 4 | Yuga Kawada | Yasutoshi Ikee | Kaneko Makoto Holdings | 1:08.0 |
| 2024 | Lugal | 4 | Atsuya Nishimura | Haruki Sugiyama | Yoshimasa Ema | 1:07.0 |
| 2025 | Win Carnelian | 8 | Kousei Miura | Yuichi Shikato | Win Co. Ltd. | 1:06.9 |
| 2026 | Puro Magic | 5 | Mirai Iwata | Shogo Yasuda | Three H Racing Co. Ltd. | 1:09.2 |

^{1} The 2002 and 2014 race took place at Niigata Racecourse.

== Past winners ==
- 1967 - Onward Hill
- 1968 - Suzu Hayate
- 1969 - Takeshiba O
- 1970 - Tamami
- 1971 - Kensachi
- 1972 - Noboru Toko
- 1973 - Kyoei Green
- 1974 - Sakura Iwai
- 1975 - Sakura Iwai
- 1976 - Jumbo King
- 1977 - Meiwa Kimiko
- 1978 - Meiwa Kimiko
- 1979 - Sunny Flower
- 1980 - Sakura God
- 1981 - Sakura Shingeki
- 1982 - Brocade
- 1983 - Shin Wolf
- 1984 - Happy Progress
- 1985 - Marutaka Storm
- 1986 - Dokan Tesco
- 1987 - King Frolic
- 1988 - Dyna Actress
- 1989 - Winning Smile

== See also ==
- Horse racing in Japan
- List of Japanese flat horse races
