= Princely Gift =

British-bred Thoroughbred racehorse and sire (1951–1973)

- Sire: Nasrullah
- Grandsire: Nearco
- Dam: Blue Gem
- Damsire: Blue Peter
- Sex: Stallion
- Foaled: 1951
- Country: United Kingdom
- Colour: Bay
- Breeder: Alfer Allnatt
- Owner: Victor Sassoon
- Trainer: Noel Murless
- Record: 23:9-4-4

Major wins
- Challenge Stakes (1954); Hungerford Stakes (1955); Portland Handicap (1955)

Awards
- Timeform rating: 137
- Last updated on 23 September 2025

Princely Gift (1951–1973) was a British Thoroughbred racehorse and sire. In a racing career which lasted from 1953 until 1955 he ran twenty-three times and won nine races. After showing decent form in his first two seasons, he improved significantly in the summer of 1955 and ended his career with a record-breaking win in the Portland Handicap. Having been awarded one of the highest Timeform figures of the decade, Princely Gift was retired to stud at the end of the season and had considerable success as a sire of winners.

== Background ==
Princely Gift was a bay horse with no white markings bred by Major Alfred Allnat. He was one of the last crop of European foals sired by Nasrullah before the stallion was exported to the United States. His dam, Blue Gem was a daughter of the Derby winner Blue Peter, giving Princely Gift a pedigree more typical of a middle-distance horse rather than of the sprinter he became. As a yearling, Princely Gift was sent to the sales where he was bought for 5,000 guineas by Sir Victor Sassoon. The colt was sent into training with Noel Murless at Newmarket, Suffolk.

== Racing career ==
As a two-year-old, Princely Gift showed good form, notably when finishing second, beaten a short head by the future 2000 Guineas winner Darius in the July Stakes. He also finished second in a valuable race at York and won the Clearwell Stakes at Newmarket. In the Free Handicap, a ranking of the season's best British juveniles, he was given a weight of 121 pounds, twelve pounds below the top-rated Our Babu. At the end of the season he was sent to the sales but failed to reach his reserve price and remained in Sassoon's ownership.

In 1954 Princely Gift established himself a good sprint handicapper by winning the Ditton Sprint at Sandown Park, giving the twenty-six time champion jockey Gordon Richards the last win of his career. Towards the end of the season, Princely Gift began to show improved form and at Newmarket in October he recorded his first important weight-for-age win. Ridden by Lester Piggott, he won the six furlong Challenge Stakes at odds of 2/1.

Princely Gift's early form in 1955 was unremarkable and he ran poorly in the Wokingham Stakes at Royal Ascot. From this point on he showed his best form and won his three remaining races impressively. In July he won the Chichester Stakes at Goodwood and in the following month he added a victory in the Hungerford Stakes over seven furlongs at Newbury Racecourse. At Doncaster in September he was assigned a weight of 130 pounds Portland Handicap. He won easily by four lengths, setting a new course record.

== Assessment ==
The independent Timeform awarded Princely Gift a peak rating of 137 in 1955, making him their highest-rated older horse of the season and the equal third highest British-trained horses of the 1950s. Despite his lofty rating, he was not the top sprinter of the year, that honour going to the three-year-old Pappa Fourway (139).

In their book A Century of Champions, based on a modified version of the Timeform system, John Randall and Tony Morris rated Princely Gift the second best British or Irish-trained horse of his generation, behind Derby winner Never Say Die. He was also rated the eleventh-best British or Irish-trained sprinter of the 20th century.

== Stud record ==
Princely Gift proved to be a highly successful breeding stallion. His best winners included Floribunda, So Blessed (July Cup, Nunthorpe Stakes), Faberge (second in the 2,000 Guineas, sire of Rheingold and Giacometti), Tesco Boy (six times Leading sire in Japan), Tribal Chief (New Stakes, sire of Mrs McArdy) and Sun Prince (St. James's Palace Stakes, Queen Anne Stakes). Princely Gift died in 1973.

== Pedigree ==
Pedigree of Princely Gift (GB), bay stallion, 1951
Sire Nasrullah (GB) 1940	Nearco (ITY); 1935	Pharos	Phalaris
Sire Nasrullah (GB) 1940	Nearco (ITY); 1935	Pharos	Scapa Flow
Sire Nasrullah (GB) 1940	Nearco (ITY); 1935	Nogara	Havresac
Sire Nasrullah (GB) 1940	Nearco (ITY); 1935	Nogara	Catnip
Sire Nasrullah (GB) 1940	Mumtaz Begum (FR); 1932	Blenheim	Blandford
Sire Nasrullah (GB) 1940	Mumtaz Begum (FR); 1932	Blenheim	Malva
Sire Nasrullah (GB) 1940	Mumtaz Begum (FR); 1932	Mumtaz Mahal	The Tetrarch
Sire Nasrullah (GB) 1940	Mumtaz Begum (FR); 1932	Mumtaz Mahal	Lady Josephine
Dam Blue Gem (GB) 1943	Blue Peter (GB); 1936	Fairway	Phalaris
Dam Blue Gem (GB) 1943	Blue Peter (GB); 1936	Fairway	Scapa Flow
Dam Blue Gem (GB) 1943	Blue Peter (GB); 1936	Fancy Free	Stefan the Great
Dam Blue Gem (GB) 1943	Blue Peter (GB); 1936	Fancy Free	Celiba
Dam Blue Gem (GB) 1943	Sparkle (GB); 1935	Blandford	Swynford
Dam Blue Gem (GB) 1943	Sparkle (GB); 1935	Blandford	Blanche
Dam Blue Gem (GB) 1943	Sparkle (GB); 1935	Gleam	Galloper Light
Dam Blue Gem (GB) 1943	Sparkle (GB); 1935	Gleam	Eagerford (Family 13-a)

- Princely Gift was inbred 3 x 4 to Blandford, meaning that this stallion appears in both the third and fourth generations of his pedigree. He was also inbred 4 x 4 to Phalaris.
