= Kokura Nisai Stakes =

Kokura Nisai Stakes 小倉2歳ステークス
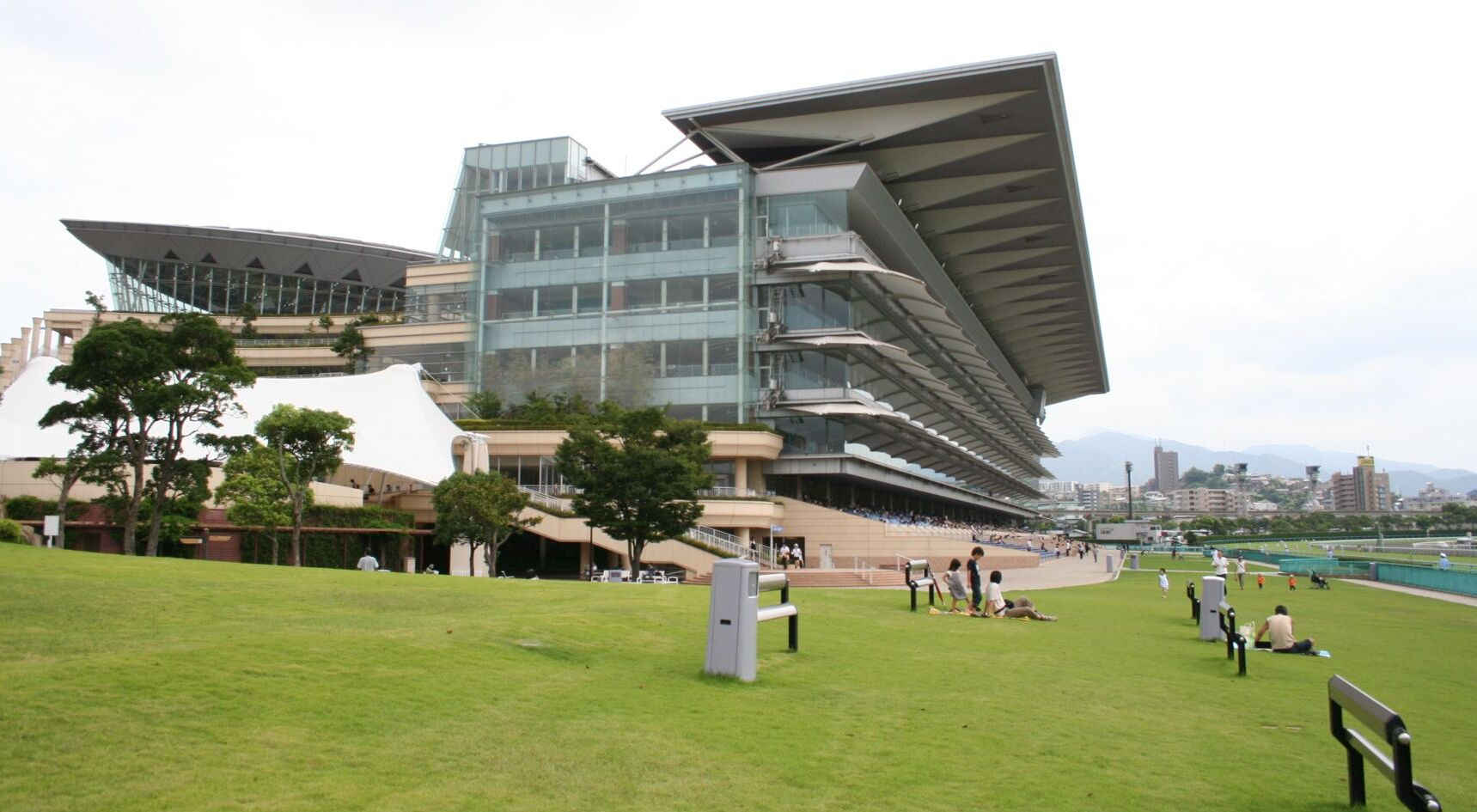
- The Grandstand at Kokura
- Class: Grade 3
- Location: Kokura Racecourse
- Inaugurated: 1961
- Race type: Thoroughbred Flat racing

Race information
- Distance: 1200 metres
- Surface: Turf
- Track: Right-handed
- Qualification: 2-y-o
- Weight: 55 kg
- Purse: ¥ 66,860,000 (as of 2024): 1st: ¥ 31,000,000; 2nd: ¥ 12,000,000; 3rd: ¥ 8,000,000

The Kokura Nisai Stakes (Japanese 小倉2歳ステークス) is a defunct Grade 3 horse race in Japan for two-year-old Thoroughbreds. Organized by Japan Racing Association, it is run in September over a distance of 1200 metres at Kokura Racecourse, Kitakyushu, in Fukuoka Prefacture.

The race was first run in 1961 and was promoted to Grade 3 status in 1984.

The race was discontinued in 2024, with the Chukyo Nisai Stakes replacing the race.

== Winners since 2000 ==
Year	Winner	Jockey	Trainer	Owner	Time
2000	Riki Serenade	Yuichi Fukunaga	Tsutomu Setoguchi	Shigeki Goto	1:11.1
2001	Tamuro Cherry	Takao Koike	Masato Nishizono	Tamuro Taniguchi	1:10.6
2002	Maple Road	Jun'ichi Serizawa	Hidetaka Tadokoro	Turf Sport	1:09.8
2003	Meisho Bowler	Yuichi Fukunaga	Toshiaki Shirai	Yoshio Matsumoto	1:09.3
2004	Cosmo Valenti	Koshiro Take	Tadashi Kayo	Misako Okada	1:08.2
2005	Alluring Voice	Yutaka Take	Akihiko Nomura	Sunday Racing	1:09.1
2006	Aston Machan	Ryota Sameshima	Sei Ishizaka	Mayumi Tosa	1:08.4
2007	Marubutsu Easter	Ryuji Wada	Hiroaki Sugiura	Tsuyoshi Osawa	1:09.3
2008	De Gratia	Suguru Hamanaka	Hiroshi Miyamoto	Sunday Racing	1:09.1
2009	Jewel of Nile	Ryota Sameshima	Yoshiyuki Arakawa	Green Farm	1:09.0
2010	Brown Wild	Suguru Hamanaka	Masanori Sakaguchi	Capital Club	1:08.7
2011	Epice Arome	Suguru Hamanaka	Sei Ishizaka	Katsumi Yoshida	1:08.8
2012	Meiner Eternel	Ryuji Wada	Masato Nishizono	Thoroughbred Club Ruffian	1:07.9
2013	Horai Akiko	Ryuji Wada	Katsumi Minai	Kohei Matsumoto	1:08.8
2014	Omi Alice	Yusaku Kokubun	Norio Fujisawa	Yoshizumi Iwasaki	1:08.4
2015	Shuji	Yasunari Iwata	Kojiro Hashiguchi	Koji Yasuhara	1:08.9
2016	Reine Minoru	Suguru Hamanaka	Masaru Honda	Minoru Yoshioka	1:08.0
2017	Asakusa Genki	Yutaka Take	Hidetaka Otonashi	Keiko Tahara	1:09.1
2018	Fantasist	Yutaka Take	Tomoyuki Umeda	Toshihiro Hirosaki	1:08.9
2019	Meiner Grit	Yusaku Kokubun	Naohiro Yoshida	Thoroughbred Club Ruffian	1:10.5
2020	Meikei Yell	Yutaka Take	Hidenori Take	Nagoya Keiba	1:09.6
2021	Namura Clair	Suguru Hamanaka	Kodai Hasegawa	Mutsuhiro Namura	1:07.9
2022	London Plan	Kohei Matsuyama	Hiroshi Miyamoto	Takayuki Shimokobe	1:08.1
2023	Ask One Time	Mirai Iwata	Tomoyuki Umeda	Toshihiro Hirosaki	1:08.6
2024 (Note: The race took place at Chukyo Racecourse)	A Shin Wand	Hideaki Miyuki	Ryuji Okubo	Eishindo	1:09.0

== Earlier winners ==
- 1984 - Dyna Super
- 1985 - Kyowa Shinzan
- 1986 - Sankin Hayate
- 1987 - Pot Naopoleon
- 1988 - Dandy Apollo
- 1989 - Hagino High Touch
- 1990 - T M Lisme
- 1991 - Zinc Tamon O
- 1992 - Maruka Iris
- 1993 - Nagara Flash
- 1994 - Eishin Sansan
- 1995 - Eishin Itto O
- 1996 - Godspeed
- 1997 - Takeichi Kento
- 1998 - Koei Roman
- 1999 - Alluring Act

== See also ==
- Horse racing in Japan
- List of Japanese flat horse races
