= Fusaichi Pandora =

Japanese Thoroughbred racehorse (2003–2017)

Fusaichi Pandora フサイチパンドラ
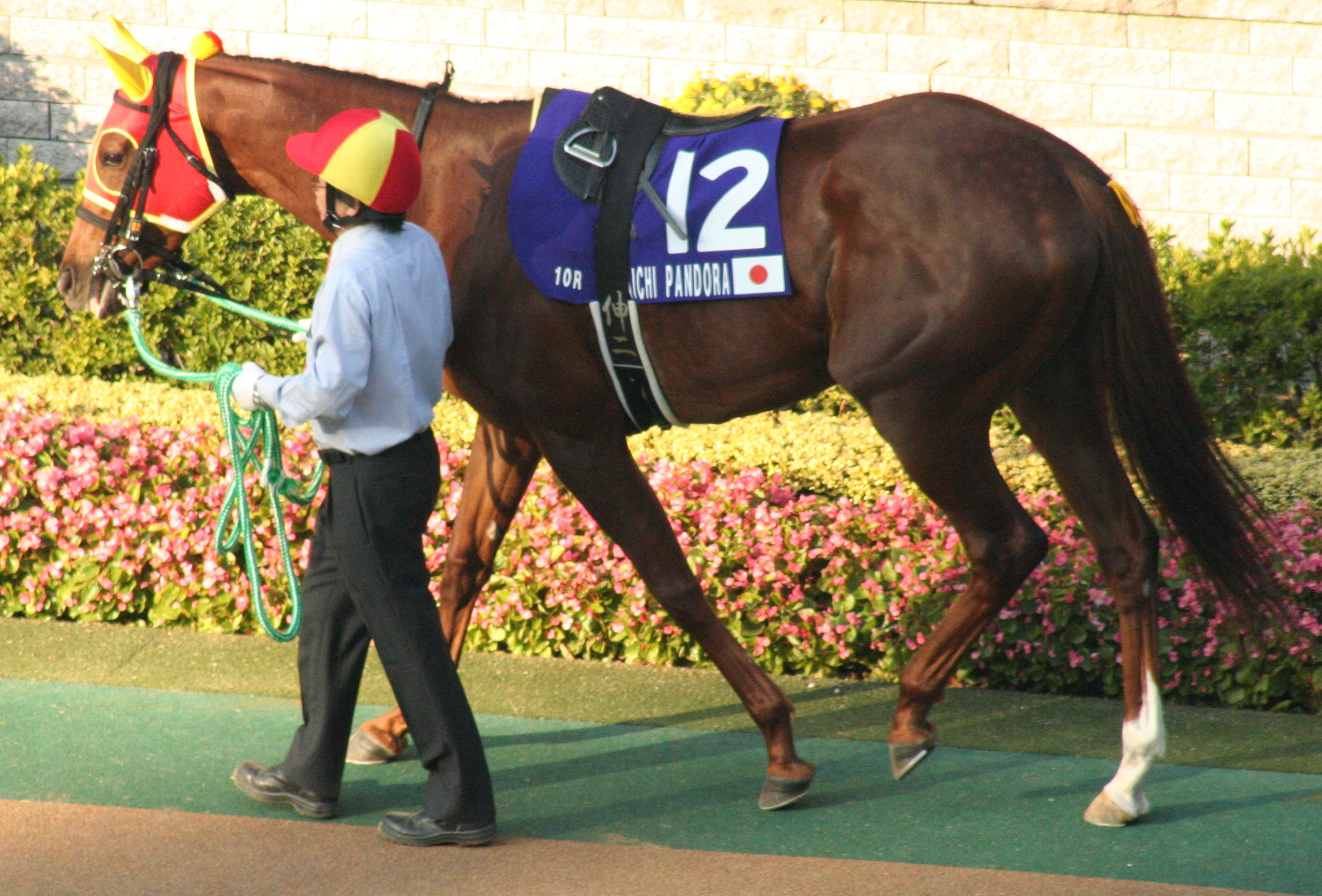
- Fusaichi Pandora in November 2007.
- Breed: Thoroughbred
- Sire: Sunday Silence
- Grandsire: Halo
- Dam: Lotta Lace
- Damsire: Nureyev
- Sex: Mare
- Foaled: February 27, 2003
- Died: October 28, 2017 (aged 14)
- Country: Japan
- Colour: Chestnut
- Breeder: Northern Farm
- Owner: Fusao Sekiguchi
- Racing colours
- Trainer: Toshiaki Shirai
- Jockey: Koichi Tsunoda; Yuichi Fukunaga; Shinji Fujita; Christophe Lemaire
- Record: 21: 4-4-4
- Earnings: ¥378,113,000

Major wins
- Queen Elizabeth II Cup (2006); Sapporo Kinen (2007)

Fusaichi Pandora (Japanese: フサイチパンドラ, Hepburn: Fusaichi Pandora; 27 February 2003 – 28 October 2017) was a Japanese Thoroughbred racehorse and broodmare. She competed from 2005 to 2007, recording four wins in twenty-one starts, including the Queen Elizabeth II Cup in 2006 and the Sapporo Kinen in 2007. As a broodmare, she foaled the Japanese Triple Tiara winner Almond Eye.

== Background ==
Fusaichi Pandora was a chestnut mare bred in Abira, Hokkaido, by Northern Farm. She was sired by Sunday Silence, and her dam was Lotta Lace, a daughter of Nureyev. She was purchased for ¥91.35 million by Fusao Sekiguchi at the 2003 Select Sale and sent into training with Toshiaki Shirai at the JRA's Ritto Training Center.

== Racing career ==
=== 2005: Two-year-old season ===
Fusaichi Pandora debuted on 12 November in a maiden race on the turf at Kyoto Racecourse, winning by a margin of 1.0 seconds. She subsequently finished third in the Hanshin Juvenile Fillies (GI) and a 5-million-yen allowance race at Hanshin Racecourse.

=== 2006: Three-year-old season ===
She began her 2006 campaign by finishing sixth in the Elfin Stakes (Open) and won the Kinsenka Sho (Allowance) in February. She finished second in the Flower Cup (GIII) and fourteenth in the Oka Sho (GI). On May 21, she contested the Yushun Himba (Japanese Oaks, GI) at Tokyo Racecourse, finishing second to Kawakami Princess.

In the autumn, she finished third in the Rose Stakes (GII) and the Shuka Sho (GI). On November 12, she entered the Queen Elizabeth II Cup (GI) at Kyoto. She finished second, but was awarded the victory after the first-place finisher, Kawakami Princess, was demoted to twelfth place due to interference in the final straight. This marked the second time in JRA history that a GI race was decided by disqualification. She concluded her season by finishing fifth in the Japan Cup (GI).

=== 2007: Four-year-old season ===
Fusaichi Pandora finished second in the Empress Hai (JpnII) on the dirt at Kawasaki Racecourse in February. She struggled in her subsequent turf starts, finishing unplaced in the Nikkei Sho (GII), Myllers Cup (GII), and Victoria Mile (GI).

On September 2, she contested the Sapporo Kinen (JpnII) at Sapporo Racecourse. Ridden by Shinji Fujita, she took the early lead and won the 2000-meter race, securing her first graded stakes victory on the track. She later finished second in the Queen Elizabeth II Cup behind Daiwa Scarlet and ninth in the Japan Cup.

She was scheduled to make her final start in the Arima Kinen (GI) at Nakayama Racecourse on December 23, but was scratched on the morning of the race due to lameness in her left hind leg. She was officially retired on December 26, 2007.

== Statistics ==
The following table details all 21 starts and 1 scheduled entry of Fusaichi Pandora's racing career based on official netkeiba and JBIS records.

| Date | Distance (Condition) | Race | Class | Course | Odds (Favourite) | Field | Finish | Time | Winning (Losing) Margin | Winner (2nd Place) | Jockey | Ref |
|---|---|---|---|---|---|---|---|---|---|---|---|---|
2005 – two-year-old season
| Nov 12 | Turf 1800 m (Good) | 2-Y-O Newcomer | Maiden | Kyoto | 2.1 (1st) | 18 | 1st | 1:48.1 | –1.0 | (Tokai Wonder) | Koichi Tsunoda | |
| Dec 4 | Turf 1600 m (Firm) | Hanshin Juvenile Fillies | GI | Hanshin | 4.0 (2nd) | 18 | 3rd | 1:37.6 | 0.3 | T M Precure | Koichi Tsunoda | |
| Dec 25 | Turf 1600 m (Firm) | 2-Y-O Allowance | Allowance | Hanshin | 1.3 (1st) | 15 | 3rd | 1:36.1 | 0.4 | Shells Ray | Koichi Tsunoda | |
2006 – three-year-old season
| Feb 4 | Turf 1600 m (Firm) | Elfin Stakes | Open | Kyoto | 1.7 (1st) | 13 | 6th | 1:36.1 | 1.3 | San Victoire | Koichi Tsunoda | |
| Feb 25 | Turf 1600 m (Firm) | Kinsenka Sho | Allowance | Nakayama | 1.8 (1st) | 16 | 1st | 1:35.1 | –0.5 | (Yuno Blacky) | Koichi Tsunoda | |
| Mar 18 | Turf 1800 m (Firm) | Flower Cup | GIII | Nakayama | 2.0 (1st) | 16 | 2nd | 1:49.1 | 0.2 | Kiss to Heaven | Koichi Tsunoda | |
| Apr 9 | Turf 1600 m (Firm) | Oka Shō | GI | Hanshin | 6.6 (2nd) | 18 | 14th | 1:36.4 | 1.8 | Kiss to Heaven | Koichi Tsunoda | |
| May 21 | Turf 2400 m (Firm) | Yushun Himba | GI | Tokyo | 12.6 (5th) | 18 | 2nd | 2:26.3 | 0.1 | Kawakami Princess | Yuichi Fukunaga | |
| Sep 17 | Turf 2000 m (Firm) | Rose Stakes | GII | Chukyo | 3.0 (2nd) | 17 | 3rd | 1:59.0 | 0.8 | Admire Kiss | Yuichi Fukunaga | |
| Oct 15 | Turf 2000 m (Firm) | Shūka Shō | GI | Kyoto | 11.7 (4th) | 18 | 3rd | 1:58.5 | 0.3 | Kawakami Princess | Yuichi Fukunaga | |
| Nov 12 | Turf 2200 m (Firm) | Queen Elizabeth II Cup | GI | Kyoto | 26.2 (7th) | 15 | 1st | 2:11.6 | 0.0 | (Sweep Tosho) | Yuichi Fukunaga | |
| Nov 26 | Turf 2400 m (Firm) | Japan Cup | GI | Tokyo | 52.6 (8th) | 11 | 5th | 2:25.9 | 0.8 | Deep Impact | Yuichi Fukunaga | |
2007 – four-year-old season
| Feb 28 | Dirt 2100 m (Standard) | Empress Hai | JpnII | Kawasaki | 2.1 (1st) | 13 | 2nd | 2:16.7 | 0.3 | Tosen Jo O | Yuichi Fukunaga | |
| Mar 24 | Turf 2500 m (Firm) | Nikkei Sho | GII | Nakayama | 8.1 (4th) | 14 | 9th | 2:33.0 | 1.2 | Nevre Bouchon | Yuichi Fukunaga | |
| Apr 14 | Turf 1600 m (Firm) | Myllers Cup | GII | Hanshin | 30.8 (12th) | 15 | 9th | 1:33.4 | 1.2 | Kongo Rikio | Yuichi Fukunaga | |
| May 13 | Turf 1600 m (Firm) | Victoria Mile | GI | Tokyo | 22.2 (6th) | 18 | 12th | 1:33.5 | 1.0 | Koiuta | Yuichi Fukunaga | |
| Aug 12 | Turf 1800 m (Firm) | Queen Stakes | GIII | Sapporo | 6.5 (3rd) | 11 | 5th | 1:47.1 | 0.4 | Asahi Rising | Yuichi Fukunaga | |
| Sep 2 | Turf 2000 m (Firm) | Sapporo Kinen | GII | Sapporo | 9.8 (5th) | 16 | 1st | 2:00.1 | 0.0 | (Agnes Ark) | Shinji Fujita | |
| Sep 17 | Dirt 1700 m (Good) | Elm Stakes | GIII | Sapporo | 5.5 (4th) | 13 | 11th | 1:45.1 | 1.8 | Meisho Tokon | Yusuke Fujioka | |
| Nov 11 | Turf 2200 m (Firm) | Queen Elizabeth II Cup | GI | Kyoto | 8.3 (3rd) | 14 | 2nd | 2:12.0 | 0.1 | Daiwa Scarlet | Christophe Lemaire | |
| Nov 25 | Turf 2400 m (Firm) | Japan Cup | GI | Tokyo | 74.8 (12th) | 18 | 9th | 2:25.7 | 1.0 | Admire Moon | Shinji Fujita | |
| Dec 23 | Turf 2500 m (Firm) | Arima Kinen | GI | Nakayama | – | 16 | Scratched | – | – | Matsurida Gogh | Shinji Fujita | |

== Broodmare career ==
Following her retirement, Fusaichi Pandora returned to Northern Farm to become a broodmare. She produced nine foals before her death on October 28, 2017, at the age of 14. Her most notable progeny is Almond Eye, who won the Japanese Fillies' Triple Crown in 2018, set a record of nine Grade 1-win, awarded two times Japanese Horse of the Year and being inducted into the JRA Hall of Fame in 2023.

c = colt, f = filly

| No. | Name | Foaled | Sex | Color | Sire | Owner | Races | Wins | Remarks |
|---|---|---|---|---|---|---|---|---|---|
| 1st | Supervia | 2009 | c | Dark bay | Symboli Kris S | Kazuhiro Sasaki | 23 | 2 | Retired, riding horse |
| 2nd | Pyxis | 2010 | f | Black | Symboli Kris S | Carrot Farm | 8 | 1 | Retired, broodmare |
| 3rd | Sun Elpis | 2011 | f | Chestnut | King Kamehameha | Masahiro Mita | 12 | 1 | Retired, broodmare |
| 4th | Pandora's Hope | 2012 | f | Dark bay | King Kamehameha | Yasushi Kubota | 11 | 2 | Retired, broodmare |
| 5th | Danon Yell | 2013 | c | Bay | Harbinger | Danox | 4 | 1 | Retired, riding horse |
| 6th | Pan de Ring | 2014 | f | Chestnut | King Kamehameha | | | | Did not run, broodmare |
| 7th | Almond Eye | 2015 | f | Bay | Lord Kanaloa | Silk Racing | 15 | 11 | Retired, broodmare |
| 8th | Unakite | 2016 | f | Chestnut | Johannesburg | Silk Racing | 17 | 2 | Retired, broodmare |
| 9th | Satono Esperanza | 2017 | c | Bay | Rulership | Satomi Horse Company | 5 | 1 | Deceased |

== In popular culture ==
An anthropomorphized version of Fusaichi Pandora appears as a character in the Japanese multimedia franchise Umamusume: Pretty Derby, voiced by Moe Kahara. She is depicted as a spoiled, carefree girl from the Junior Division who was constantly showered with praise and pampered by her family, and regularly refers to herself as a genius as a result. In a reversal of their real-life relationship, Almond Eye is her senior and close friend whom she often pampers herself.

== Pedigree ==
Pedigree of Fusaichi Pandora (JPN), chestnut filly, 2003
| Sire Sunday Silence (USA) 1986 | Halo; 1969 | Hail to Reason | Turn-to |
| Sire Sunday Silence (USA) 1986 | Halo; 1969 | Hail to Reason | Nothirdchance |
| Sire Sunday Silence (USA) 1986 | Halo; 1969 | Cosmah | Cosmic Bomb |
| Sire Sunday Silence (USA) 1986 | Halo; 1969 | Cosmah | Almahmoud |
| Sire Sunday Silence (USA) 1986 | Wishing Well; 1975 | Understanding | Promised Land |
| Sire Sunday Silence (USA) 1986 | Wishing Well; 1975 | Understanding | Pretty Ways |
| Sire Sunday Silence (USA) 1986 | Wishing Well; 1975 | Mountain Flower | Montparnasse |
| Sire Sunday Silence (USA) 1986 | Wishing Well; 1975 | Mountain Flower | Edelweiss |
| Dam Lotta Lace (USA) 1992 | Nureyev; 1977 | Northern Dancer | Nearctic |
| Dam Lotta Lace (USA) 1992 | Nureyev; 1977 | Northern Dancer | Natalma |
| Dam Lotta Lace (USA) 1992 | Nureyev; 1977 | Special | Forli |
| Dam Lotta Lace (USA) 1992 | Nureyev; 1977 | Special | Thong |
| Dam Lotta Lace (USA) 1992 | Sex Appeal; 1970 | Buckpasser | Tom Fool |
| Dam Lotta Lace (USA) 1992 | Sex Appeal; 1970 | Buckpasser | Busanda |
| Dam Lotta Lace (USA) 1992 | Sex Appeal; 1970 | Best in Show | Traffic Judge |
| Dam Lotta Lace (USA) 1992 | Sex Appeal; 1970 | Best in Show | Stolen Hour |

- Fusaichi Pandora is inbred 4 × 5 to Almahmoud.

== See also ==
- Thoroughbred racing in Japan
- Queen Elizabeth II Cup
