= Black Hawk (racehorse) =

British-bred, Japanese-trained Thoroughbred racehorse (1994–2015)

Black Hawk ブラックホーク
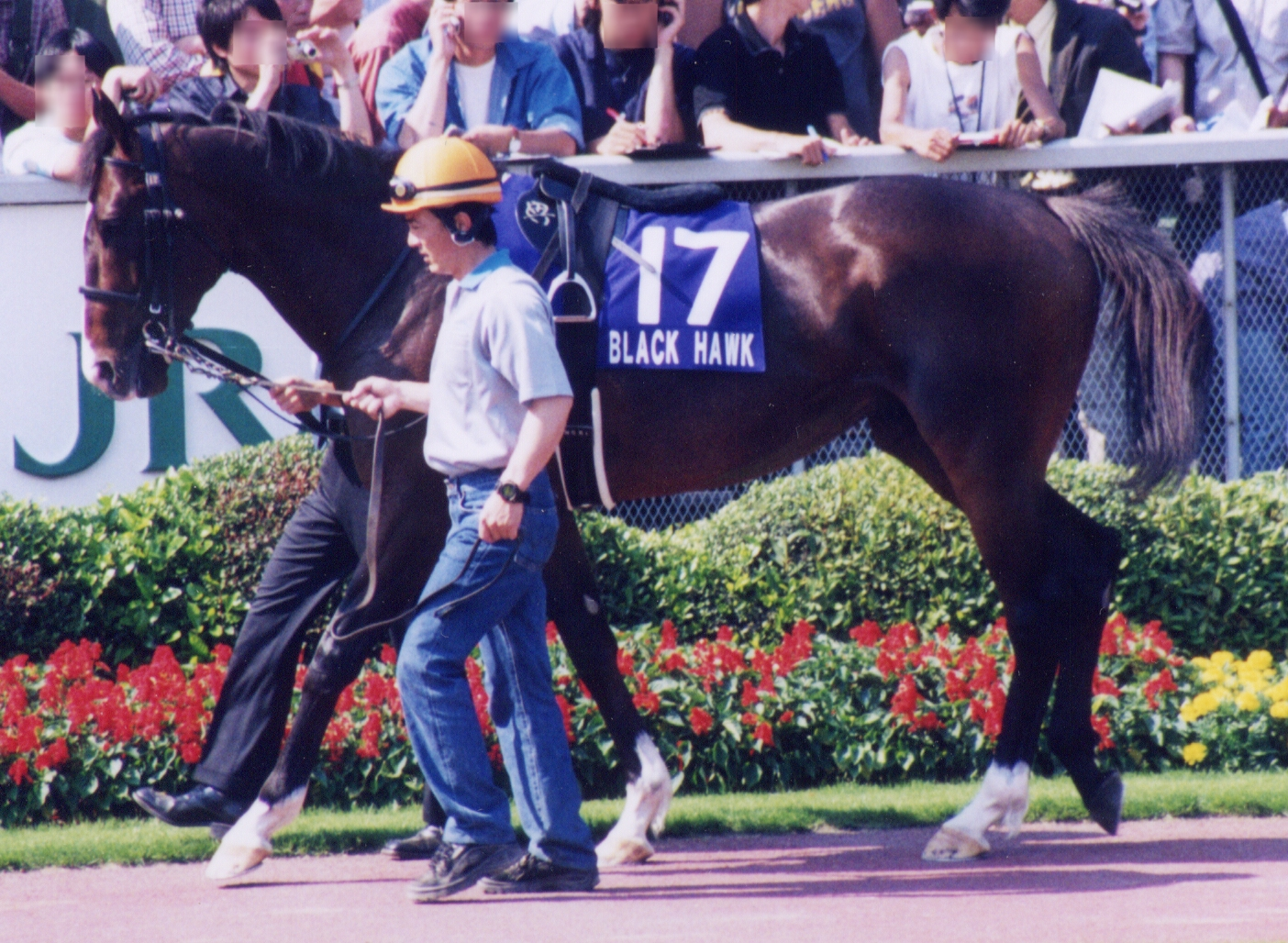
- Black Hawk at the 2001 Yasuda Kinen
- Breed: Thoroughbred
- Sire: Nureyev
- Grandsire: Northern Dancer
- Dam: Silver Lane
- Damsire: Silver Hawk
- Sex: Stallion
- Foaled: 14 May 1994
- Died: 22 May 2015 (aged 21)
- Country: United Kingdom
- Color: Bay
- Breeder: Watership Down Stud
- Owner: Kaneko Makoto Holdings Co.
- Racing colours
- Trainer: Sakae Kuneida
- Jockey: Norihiro Yokoyama
- Record: 28: 9-8-6
- Earnings: ¥652,670,000

Major wins
- Lord Derby Challenge Trophy (1998); Swan Stakes (1999); Sprinters Stakes (1999); Hankyu Hai (2000); Yasuda Kinen (2001)
- Last updated on 20 May 2026

Black Hawk (ブラックホーク, Hepburn: Burakku Hōku, 14 May 1994 – 22 June 2015) was a British-bred, Japanese-trained Thoroughbred racehorse who was active during the late 1990s to early 2000s. As a five year old in 1999, he won his first G1 and G3 race — the Sprinters Stakes and the Swan Stakes, respectively. Later on, he also won the Yasuda Kinen in 2001 before retiring with a total earnings of ¥652,670,000.

== Background ==
Black Hawk was bay horse foaled by Silver Lane, a daughter of Silver Hawk, on 14 May 1994. He was sired by Nureyev, who also foaled other racehorses such as Heart Lake, Theatrical, Sonic Lady, and Miesque.

He was bred on the Watership Down Stud, located in Berkshire, England.

== Racing career ==
=== 1997: three-year-old season ===
Black Hawk started his debut on 1997 in a mile race at Nakayama Racecourse in which he ran at the front, took the lead at the second bend and held the lead until the end to win by one-and-a-quarter-length over Great Clear. He was scratched in his third race, got his second win at his fifth race at the Yaezakura Sho and ending his debut season with a second place finish at the Komakusa Sho.

=== 1998: four-year-old season ===
In this season, Black Hawk gained his third career win in his second start of year at the Shunko Sho on February. From that point, he etched a three-winning-streak in a row including his first graded race win at the Lord Derby Challenge Trophy, where he stayed at the middle group before bursted forward for the lead and overtook the front running Keiwan Viking to win by one-and-three-quarters-of-a-length. On the next race, he placed in third at the Keio Hai Spring Cup before finished disappointingly at 11th-place in the Yasuda Kinen afterward. He then took a full year break after those two starts.

=== 1999: five-year-old season ===
This year would become his best season so far as he finished in podiums in all five starts and also won his first G1 race. First, he finished in second place at the Sekiya Kinen in August. Then, he placed third at the Keisei Hai Autumn Handicap before winning the Swan Stakes in October by two lengths over Broad Appeal. He then finished third at the Mile Championship next in which his normal jockey, Norihiro Yokoyama declared that "This horse is a sprinter". Because of this remark, Yokoyama for this point on became his only jockey and entered the Sprinters Stakes in December. Yokoyama rode him on the middle before surged forward at the final straight, passed Agnes World who was jockeyed by Yutaka Take to take the win by a neck at the line.

=== 2000: six-year-old season ===
He started strong in this year in his first start when he settled into a good third position and pulled away early in the straight to claim victory at the Hankyu Hai. This win turned out to be the highest point for the rest of the season as he would finished second in three races (Centaur Stakes, Keio Hai Spring Cup and CBC Sho) and only managed third place in the Sprinters Stakes behind Daitaku Yamato and Agnes World. He also finished unplaced in both mile races he participated in, the Yasuda Kinen and the Mile Championships.

=== 2001: seven-year-old season ===
In the first two starts of the year, Black Hawk ran well and placed in second at the Hankyu Hai and notably, Takamatsunomiya Kinen in which he lost only by half-a-length behind Trot Star. After a third place at the Keio Hai Spring Cup, Black Hawk entered the Yasuda Kinen for the second time. In this occasion, he waited at the back of the field for most of the race per instruction of his owner, Makoto Kaneko himself. Then, Yokoyama urged Black Hawk to make a late surge from the outside in the straight, overtaking every single horse and winning his second G1 race by one length over Breaktime in second place. There was a plan to send him for Hong Kong expedition but it was halted as Black Hawk developed leg problems that were severe enough to force him to be retired from racing afterward.

== Racing form ==
Black Hawk won nine races and placed 14 times out of 28 starts. This data is available based on JBIS and netkeiba.

Date	Track	Race	Grade	Distance (Condition)	Entry	HN	Odds (Favored)	Finish	Time	Margins	Jockey	Winner (Runner-up)
1997 – three-year-old season
Jan 6	Nakayama	3YO debut		1,600 m (Soft)	16	4	1.7（1）	1st	1:39.8	−0.2	Yukio Okabe	(Great Clear)
Feb 1	Tokyo	Saintpaulia Sho	ALW (1W)	1,800 m (Firm)	14	7	3.9（1）	3rd	1:49.1	0.6	Yukio Okabe	Inter Punch
Feb 16	Tokyo	Haruna Sho	ALW (1W)	1,400 m (Soft)	13	11	–	Scratched	–	–	Yukio Okabe	Meisho Dengeki
Apr 19	Niigata	Warabi Sho	ALW (1W)	1,600 m (Good)	15	9	3.1（1）	2nd	1:35.7	0.0	Hisaaki Kobayashi	Yuki Fuji
May 4	Tokyo	Yaezakura Sho	ALW (1W)	1,600 m (Firm)	6	5	2.0（1）	1st	1:36.8	–0.2	Norihiro Yokoyama	(Doo-Wop)
Jun 1	Tokyo	Komakusa Sho	ALW (2W)	2,000 m (Firm)	15	5	2.5（1）	2nd	2:01.6	0.0	Norihiro Yokoyama	Toa Stealth
1998 – four-year-old season
Feb 1	Kyoto	Ujigawa Tokubetsu	ALW (2W)	1,400 m (Firm)	16	11	7.6（3）	4th	1:22.5	0.5	Koichi Tsunoda	Rey Seattle
Feb 21	Tokyo	Shunko Sho	ALW (2W)	1,600 m (Good)	16	15	2.6（1）	1st	1:34.8	0.0	Norihiro Yokoyama	(Green Blitz)
Mar 15	Nakayama	Bloodstone Stakes	ALW (3W)	1,600 m (Firm)	14	1	3.5（2）	1st	1:35.3	–0.5	Norihiro Yokoyama	(Nippo Atlas)
Apr 11	Nakayama	Lord Derby Challenge Trophy	3	1,600 m (Good)	11	2	3.8（2）	1st	1:34.3	–0.3	Yukio Okabe	(Keiwan Viking)
May 16	Tokyo	Keio Hai Spring Cup	2	1,400 m (Firm)	16	13	8.6（4）	3rd	1:20.7	0.6	Hiroki Goto	Taiki Shuttle
Jun 14	Tokyo	Yasuda Kinen	1	1,600 m (Heavy)	17	13	11.5（2）	11th	1:39.5	2.0	Hiroki Goto	Taiki Shuttle
1999 – five-year-old season
Aug 8	Niigata	Sekiya Kinen	3	1,600 m (Firm)	18	14	5.8（3）	2nd	1:32.0	0.4	Masayoshi Ebina	Reward Ninfa
Sep 12	Nakayama	Keisei Hai Autumn Handicap	3	1,600 m (Firm)	15	3	1.8（1）	3rd	1:32.9	0.1	Yoshitomi Shibata	Sunrise Atlas
Oct 30	Kyoto	Swan Stakes	2	1,400 m (Firm)	12	8	1.6（1）	1st	1:20.2	–0.3	Masayoshi Ebina	(Broad Appeal)
Nov 21	Kyoto	Mile Championship	1	1,600 m (Firm)	18	15	3.8（2）	3rd	1:33.2	0.4	Yutaka Take	Air Jihad
Dec 19	Nakayama	Sprinters Stakes	1	1,200 m (Firm)	16	10	3.8（2）	1st	1:08.2	0.0	Norihiro Yokoyama	(Agnes World)
2000 – six-year-old season
Feb 27	Hanshin	Hankyu Hai	3	1,200 m (Firm)	12	3	1.6（1）	1st	1:08.7	–0.2	Norihiro Yokoyama	(Divine Light)
Mar 26	Chukyo	Takamatsunomiya Kinen	1	1,200 m (Firm)	17	16	2.2（1）	4th	1:08.7	0.1	Norihiro Yokoyama	King Halo
May 14	Tokyo	Keio Hai Spring Cup	2	1,400 m (Firm)	18	13	4.4（2）	2nd	1:21.3	0.3	Norihiro Yokoyama	Stinger
Jun 4	Tokyo	Yasuda Kinen	1	1,600 m (Firm)	18	8	4.9（2）	9th	1:34.6	0.7	Norihiro Yokoyama	Fairy King Prawn
Sep 10	Hanshin	Centaur Stakes	3	1,200 m (Firm)	16	14	2.4（1）	2nd	1:07.6	0.0	Norihiro Yokoyama	Behind The Mask
Oct 1	Nakayama	Sprinters Stakes	1	1,200 m (Good)	16	2	4.2（2）	3rd	1:08.8	0.2	Norihiro Yokoyama	Daitaku Yamato
Nov 19	Kyoto	Mile Championship	1	1,600 m (Firm)	18	18	4.9（2）	8th	1:33.2	0.6	Norihiro Yokoyama	Agnes Digital
Dec 16	Chukyo	CBC Sho	2	1,200 m (Firm)	16	8	4.5（2）	2nd	1:08.1	0.2	Norihiro Yokoyama	Trot Star
2001 – seven-year-old season
Feb 25	Hanshin	Hankyu Hai	3	1,200 m (Firm)	14	3	2.3（1）	2nd	1:08.8	0.1	Norihiro Yokoyama	Daitaku Yamato
Mar 25	Chukyo	Takamatsunomiya Kinen	1	1,200 m (Firm)	18	13	4.0（3）	2nd	1:08.5	0.1	Norihiro Yokoyama	Trot Star
May 13	Tokyo	Keio Hai Spring Cup	2	1,400 m (Firm)	18	12	2.5（1）	3rd	1:20.2	0.1	Norihiro Yokoyama	Stinger
Jun 3	Tokyo	Yasuda Kinen	1	1,600 m (Firm)	18	17	20.1（9）	1st	1:33.0	–0.2	Norihiro Yokoyama	(Breaktime)

Legend:
Turf

== Stud career and death ==
Black Hawk became a stud at Shadai Stallion Station in 2002, moving to Breeders' Stallion Station in 2007 and transferred again to Honda Tsuchihisa farm located in Kumamoto from 2011. He was also occasionally became a shuttle stud in Australia. In his career as a stud between 2002 until 2015, he bred with 842 mares, produced 495 foals, registered 470 foals, earned 2,869,842,500 ¥ in progeny winnings with AEI of 0.55.

=== Notable progeny ===
c = colt, f = filly

Grade winners
Foaled	Name	Sex	Major Wins
2004	Couverture	f	Keeneland Cup
2005	Celebrita	f	Kyoto Himba Stakes

On 22 July 2015, Black Hawk died due to heart attack at Honda Tsuchihisa Farm. He was 21 years old.

== Pedigree ==
Pedigree of Black Hawk, bay horse, 14 May 1994
Sire Nureyev b. 1977 (USA)	Northern Dancer b. 1961 (CAN)	Nearctic (CAN)	Nearco (ITY)
Sire Nureyev b. 1977 (USA)	Northern Dancer b. 1961 (CAN)	Nearctic (CAN)	Lady Angela (GB)
Sire Nureyev b. 1977 (USA)	Northern Dancer b. 1961 (CAN)	Natalma (USA)	Native Dancer (USA)
Sire Nureyev b. 1977 (USA)	Northern Dancer b. 1961 (CAN)	Natalma (USA)	Almahmoud (USA)
Sire Nureyev b. 1977 (USA)	Special b. 1969 (USA)	Forli (ARG)	Aristophanes (GB)
Sire Nureyev b. 1977 (USA)	Special b. 1969 (USA)	Forli (ARG)	Trevisa (ARG)
Sire Nureyev b. 1977 (USA)	Special b. 1969 (USA)	Thong (USA)	Nantallah (USA)
Sire Nureyev b. 1977 (USA)	Special b. 1969 (USA)	Thong (USA)	Rough Shod (GB)
Dam Silver Lane dk.b. 1985 (USA)	Silver Hawk b. 1979 (USA)	Roberto (USA)	Hail To Reason (USA)
Dam Silver Lane dk.b. 1985 (USA)	Silver Hawk b. 1979 (USA)	Roberto (USA)	Bramalea (USA)
Dam Silver Lane dk.b. 1985 (USA)	Silver Hawk b. 1979 (USA)	Gris Vitesse (USA)	Amerigo (GB)
Dam Silver Lane dk.b. 1985 (USA)	Silver Hawk b. 1979 (USA)	Gris Vitesse (USA)	Matchiche (FR)
Dam Silver Lane dk.b. 1985 (USA)	Strait Lane dk.b. 1974 (USA)	Chieftain (USA)	Bold Ruler (USA)
Dam Silver Lane dk.b. 1985 (USA)	Strait Lane dk.b. 1974 (USA)	Chieftain (USA)	Pocahontas (USA)
Dam Silver Lane dk.b. 1985 (USA)	Strait Lane dk.b. 1974 (USA)	Level Sands (USA)	Mahmoud (FR)
Dam Silver Lane dk.b. 1985 (USA)	Strait Lane dk.b. 1974 (USA)	Level Sands (USA)	Crawfish (USA) (Family: 5-g)
