= Goodbye Halo =

American-bred Thoroughbred racehorse

- Goodbye Halo racing alongside Winning Colors at the 1988 Las Virgenes Stakes.
- Breed: Thoroughbred
- Sire: Halo
- Grandsire: Hail To Reason
- Dam: Pound Foolish
- Damsire: Sir Ivor
- Sex: Mare
- Foaled: February 12, 1985
- Died: August 23, 2014
- Country: United States
- Colour: Chestnut
- Breeder: Dr. William O. Reed
- Owner: Arthur B. Hancock III & Alex Campbell Jr.
- Trainer: Jose Martin (1987); Charles E. Whittingham (1987–1989)
- Record: 24: 11–5–4
- Earnings: $1,706,702

Major wins
- Demoiselle Stakes (1987); Hollywood Starlet Stakes (1987); Santa Ynez Stakes (1988); Las Virgenes Stakes (1988); Kentucky Oaks (1988); Mother Goose Stakes (1988); Coaching Club American Oaks (1988); El Encino Stakes (1989); La Cañada Stakes (1989); Chula Vista Handicap (1989)

Goodbye Halo (February 12, 1985 – August 23, 2014) was an American Thoroughbred racehorse and broodmare. A daughter of the noted sire Halo, she won 10 graded stakes races over a race career spanning from ages two to four. Following her racing career, she was sent to Japan for broodmare duty and most notably produced the sire King Halo.

== Background ==
Goodbye Halo was a chestnut mare bred in Kentucky by Dr. William O. Reed. Reed was an equine surgeon who most notably performed surgery on Ruffian following her breakdown during her match race with Foolish Pleasure. In addition to practicing veterinary medicine, Reed also bred racehorses at his Mare Haven Farm near Lexington, Kentucky. Goodbye Halo was sired by Halo, a good turf runner who won the 1974 United Nations Handicap and three other stakes races. At stud at Windfields Farm in Maryland and later Stone Farm in Kentucky, Halo sired 62 stakes winners including Sunday Silence, Glorious Song, Devil's Bag, Saint Ballado, Misty Gallore, and Coup de Folie.

As a yearling, Goodbye Halo sold for $47,000 to Lion Crest Stable, acting as an agent.

== Racing career ==
=== 1987: two-year-old season ===
Goodbye Halo won her first race, a maiden special weight at Belmont Park on October 11, 1987, by eight lengths. Just six days later, her connections entered her in the Frizette Stakes, where she finished eighth. Despite that loss, she came back to win the Grade 1 Demoiselle Stakes. Following her win in the Demoiselle, Goodbye Halo left the barn of her original trainer Jose Martin and was sent to the West Coast to join the barn of Charlie Whittingham.

Goodbye Halo's connections opted to skip the Breeders' Cup Juvenile Fillies and send her to the Hollywood Starlet Stakes, which she won by 3 1/2 lengths. In the voting for American Champion Two-Year-Old Filly, she finished second to Breeders' Cup Juvenile Fillies winner Epitome.

=== 1988: three-year-old season ===
Goodbye Halo began her three-year-old season with a victory in the Grade 3 Santa Ynez Stakes on February 3, 1988. The 123-pound highweight and odds-on favorite, she went out to an early lead and easily won by five lengths in a final time of 1:23 2/5 for seven furlongs.

On February 20, she also won the Las Virgenes Stakes, in which she defeated future Kentucky Derby winner Winning Colors by a neck. On March 13, she finished third in the Santa Anita Oaks to Winning Colors.

Goodbye Halo was then shipped to Churchill Downs for the Kentucky Oaks. She and stablemate Jeanne Jones, coupled for betting purposes, were sent off as 0.9–1 favorites. Goodbye Halo ultimately won the race over Jeanne Jones, with Willa On the Move third. She then spent the summer of 1988 racing in New York. In the Grade 1 Mother Goose Stakes on June 10, Goodbye Halo stalked the early pace-setters from the outside and took the lead in the stretch, winning by 1 1/4 lengths over 36–1 longshot Make Change. She also won the Coaching Club American Oaks and finished fourth in the Grade 1 Alabama Stakes.

In October, Goodbye Halo ran third in the Las Palmas Handicap before being shipped back to Churchill Downs for the Breeders' Cup Distaff. She finished third behind the undefeated Personal Ensign and 1988 Kentucky Derby winner Winning Colors. She finished her 1988 campaign back in California with a second-place run in the Dahlia Handicap and a fifth-place finish in the Matriarch Stakes, both at Hollywood Park.

=== 1989: four-year-old season ===
Goodbye Halo's four-year-old season began with wins in the El Encino Stakes and La Cañada Stakes at Santa Anita. Two weeks after her win in the La Cañada, she finished second in the Santa Margarita Invitational Handicap. In April, she was sent to Oaklawn Park for the Apple Blossom Handicap, where she finished second.

Returning to California for the summer, Goodbye Halo ran second in the Hawthorne Handicap and third in the Vanity Handicap, both at Hollywood Park. On September 2, she won the Grade 2 Chula Vista Handicap. Following that win, she was again shipped east for a second-place finish in the Spinster Stakes at Keeneland to Bayakoa. Goodbye Halo stumbled at the start and was unable to catch Bayakoa, who was loose on the lead and won the race by 11 1/2 lengths. Goodbye Halo closed out her career finishing sixth in the Breeders' Cup Distaff, held at Gulfstream Park.

== Retirement ==
In January 1990, Goodbye Halo was offered at Keeneland January as a broodmare prospect, where she was bought for $2.1 million by Morio Sakurai and was subsequently sent to Japan.

In 1995, Goodbye Halo produced King Halo, who went on to become a Japanese Group 1 winner and sire. Sired by Dancing Brave, he won the Takamatsunomiya Kinen as a five-year-old before retiring to stud, where he sired Group 1 winners Laurel Guerreiro and Kawakami Princess, as well as Chateau Blanche, who is the dam of Equinox.

== Pedigree ==
Pedigree of Goodbye Halo, chestnut mare, foaled February 12, 1985
Sire Halo black 1969	Hail To Reason br. 1958	Turn-To b. 1951	Royal Charger
Sire Halo black 1969	Hail To Reason br. 1958	Turn-To b. 1951	Source Sucree
Sire Halo black 1969	Hail To Reason br. 1958	Nothirdchance b. 1948	Blue Swords
Sire Halo black 1969	Hail To Reason br. 1958	Nothirdchance b. 1948	Galla Colors
Sire Halo black 1969	Cosmah b. 1953	Cosmic Bomb dkb/br. 1944	Pharamond
Sire Halo black 1969	Cosmah b. 1953	Cosmic Bomb dkb/br. 1944	Banish Fear
Sire Halo black 1969	Cosmah b. 1953	Almahmoud ch. 1947	Mahmoud
Sire Halo black 1969	Cosmah b. 1953	Almahmoud ch. 1947	Arbitrator
Dam Pound Foolish bay 1979	Sir Ivor b. 1965	Sir Gaylord dkb/br. 1959	Turn-To
Dam Pound Foolish bay 1979	Sir Ivor b. 1965	Sir Gaylord dkb/br. 1959	Somethingroyal
Dam Pound Foolish bay 1979	Sir Ivor b. 1965	Attica ch. 1953	Mr. Trouble
Dam Pound Foolish bay 1979	Sir Ivor b. 1965	Attica ch. 1953	Athenia
Dam Pound Foolish bay 1979	Squander b. 1974	Buckpasser b. 1963	Tom Fool
Dam Pound Foolish bay 1979	Squander b. 1974	Buckpasser b. 1963	Busanda
Dam Pound Foolish bay 1979	Squander b. 1974	Discipline b. 1962	Princequillo
Dam Pound Foolish bay 1979	Squander b. 1974	Discipline b. 1962	Lady Be Good (Family 8-h)

Goodbye Halo is inbred 3x4 to Turn-to, meaning that Turn-to appears once in the third generation and once in the fourth generation of her pedigree.
