= Kawakami Princess =

Japanese Thoroughbred racehorse (2003–2023)

Kawakami Princess カワカミプリンセス
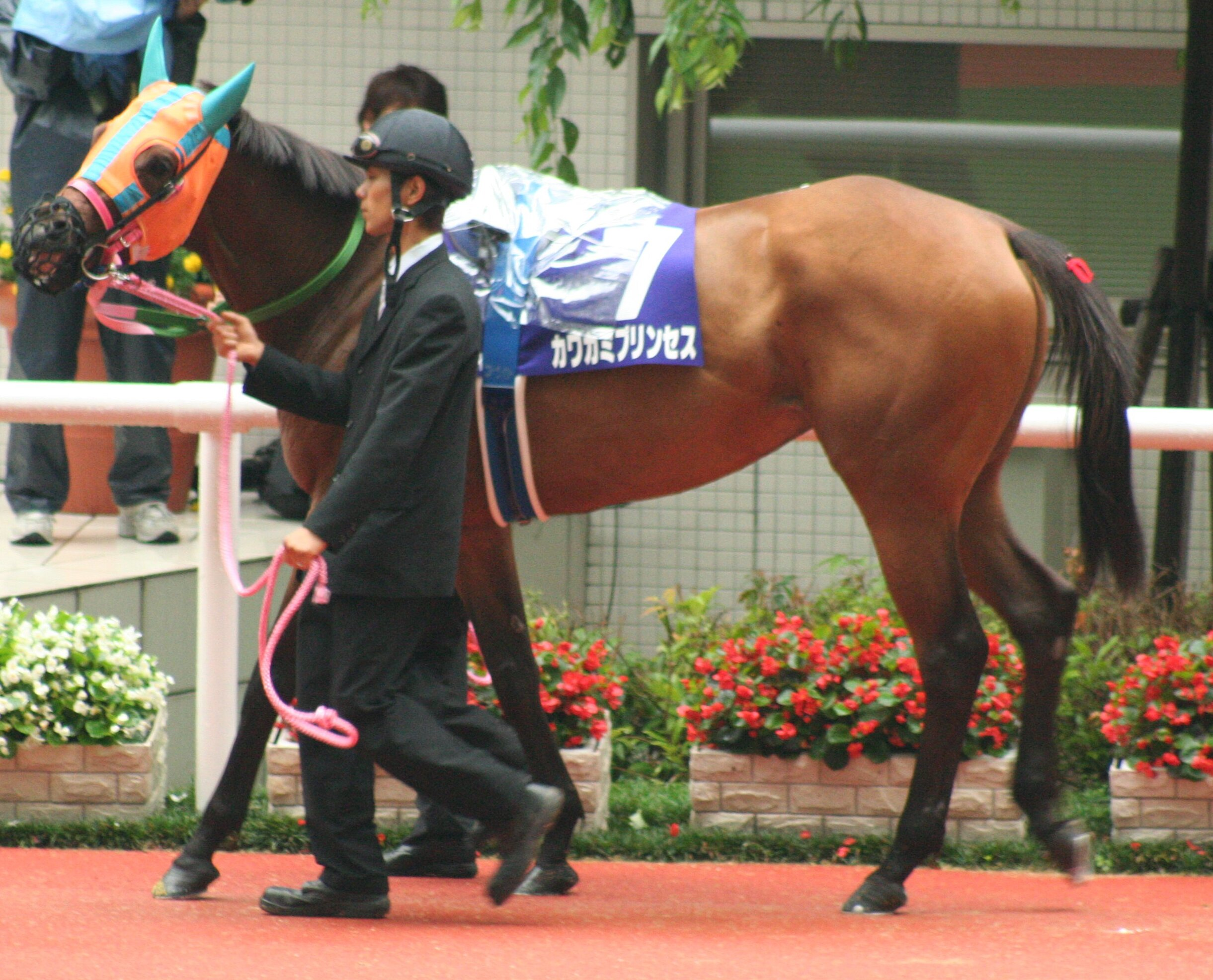
- Kawakami Princess at the 2007 Takarazuka Kinen
- Breed: Thoroughbred
- Sire: King Halo
- Grandsire: Dancing Brave
- Dam: Takano Secretary
- Damsire: Seattle Slew
- Sex: Mare
- Foaled: 5 June 2003
- Died: September 11, 2023 (aged 20); Mitsuishi, Hokkaido, Japan
- Country: Japan
- Colour: Bay
- Breeder: Mitsuishi Kawakami Bokujo
- Owner: Mitsuishi Kawakami Bokujo
- Racing colours
- Trainer: Katsuichi Nishiura
- Jockey: Masaru Honda; Koshiro Take; Norihiro Yokoyama
- Record: 17: 5-2-2
- Earnings: ¥350,892,000

Major wins
- Japanese Classic Tiara Race wins: Yushun Himba (2006); Shuka Sho (2006)

Awards
- JRA Award for Best Three-Year-Old Filly (2006); JRA Award for Best Japanese-Bred Horse (2006)

Kawakami Princess (Japanese: カワカミプリンセス, Hepburn: Kawakami Purinsesu; 5 June 2003 – 11 September 2023) was a Japanese Thoroughbred racehorse and broodmare. She competed from 2006 to 2009, recording five wins in seventeen starts, including the Yushun Himba (GI) and Shuka Shō (GI) in 2006. She won both races undefeated, becoming the first horse to win the Yushun Himba and Shuka Shō without a prior defeat. She was named JRA Award for Best Three-Year-Old Filly and JRA Award for Best Japanese-Bred Horse in 2006.

== Background ==
Kawakami Princess was a bay mare bred in Mitsuishi, Hokkaido, by Mitsuishi Kawakami Bokujo. She was sired by King Halo, a son of Dancing Brave, and her dam was Takano Secretary, an American-bred mare by Seattle Slew. Her dam's granddam was Summer Secretary, a daughter of the 1973 American Triple Crown winner Secretariat. Her racing name combines the "Kawakami" prefix of her breeder with "Princess." She was owned by Mitsuishi Kawakami Bokujo and sent into training with Katsuichi Nishiura at the JRA's Ritto Training Center.

== Racing career ==
=== 2006: Three-year-old season ===
Kawakami Princess debuted on February 26, 2006, in a maiden race on the turf at Hanshin Racecourse, ridden by Masaru Honda, winning by 1.25 lengths. She won the Kunshiran Sho (Allowance) at Hanshin in March and the Sweet Pea Stakes (Open) at Tokyo Racecourse in April.

On May 21, she won the Yushun Himba (GI) at Tokyo by 0.75 lengths, defeating Fusaichi Pandora, becoming the first horse to win the race undefeated since Miss Onward in 1957. On October 15, she won the Shuka Shō (GI) at Kyoto Racecourse by 0.5 lengths, defeating Asahi Rising, completing the Filly Triple Crown double undefeated.

On November 12, she finished first past the post in the Queen Elizabeth II Cup (GI) at Kyoto but was demoted to twelfth place after being found to have interfered with Yamanin Sucre in the straight. Fusaichi Pandora was declared the winner.

=== 2007–2009: Later career ===
Kawakami Princess finished tenth in the Victoria Mile (GI) at Tokyo in May 2007 and sixth in the Takarazuka Kinen (GI) at Hanshin in June. She was then sidelined for over a year after fracturing a sesamoid bone in training in July 2007.

She returned in May 2008, finishing third in the Kinko Shō (GII) at Chukyo Racecourse. She finished second in the Fuchu Himba Stakes (GIII) at Tokyo in October and second in the Queen Elizabeth II Cup (GI) at Kyoto in November, beaten 1.5 lengths by Little Amapola. She finished seventh in the Arima Kinen (GI) at Nakayama Racecourse in December.

In 2009, she finished fourth in the Kyoto Kinen (GII), third in the Sankei Shō Osaka Hai (GII) at Hanshin, and failed to place in her remaining three starts. She was retired from racing on November 19, 2009.

== Broodmare career ==
Following her retirement, Kawakami Princess returned to Mitsuishi Kawakami Bokujo as a broodmare. She produced ten foals between 2012 and 2021. She died on September 11, 2023, at the age of 20.

c = colt, f = filly, g = gelding

No.	Name	Foaled	Sex	Color	Sire	Races	Wins	Remarks
	(infertility)	2011			Deep Sky			
1st	Minnano Princess	2012	f	Dark bay	Commands	15	2	Broodmare
2nd	Muge Princess	2013	f	Bay	Empire Maker	15	1	Broodmare
3rd	Haruno Hidamari	2014	f	Bay	Empire Maker	5	0	Broodmare
4th	Casuapiani	2015	g	Bay	Henny Hughes	75	8	Retired
5th	Queen Hearts	2016	f	Bay	King Kamehemeha	3	0	Broodmare
6th	Grand Prix Arzan	2017	c	Chestnut	Henny Hughes	9	1	Retired
7th	George Burrows	2018	g	Dark bay	Daiwa Major	24	2	Retired
8th	Tigre	2019	c	Bay	Duramente	35	1	Retired
9th	Kawakami Elegance	2020	f	Chesnut	Declaration of War	20	1	Broodmare
10th	Love and Lucky	2021	f	Bay	California Chrome	22	7	Active

== In popular culture ==
An anthropomorphized version of Kawakami Princess appears as a character in the Japanese multimedia franchise Umamusume: Pretty Derby, voiced by Karin Takahashi. She is portrayed as a rowdy yet elegant tomboy with exceptional physical strength who looks up to King Halo, her real-life sire, and seeks to be a first-rate racer just like her. She is also devoted to searching for her ideal "prince" that she can pick up and have stand by her side as an equal, a quality inspired by her favorite magical girl anime, "Princess Fighter." A running gag in the franchise centers around her tendency to damage or destroy her surroundings and her inability to control her own strength.

== Statistics ==
The following table details all 17 starts of Kawakami Princess's racing career based on official netkeiba and JBIS records.

Date	Distance (Condition)	Race	Class	Course	Odds (Favourite)	Field	Finish	Time	Jockey	Winning (Losing) Margin	Winner (2nd Place)	Ref
2006 – three-year-old season
Feb 26	Turf 1400 m (Heavy)	3-Y-O Newcomer	Maiden	Hanshin	33.0 (9th)	15	1st	1:25.4	Masaru Honda	–0.2	(Meisho Topper)	
Mar 26	Turf 1400 m (Firm)	Kunshiran Sho	Allowance	Hanshin	11.3 (6th)	18	1st	1:23.0	Masaru Honda	–0.2	(South Tida)	
Apr 30	Turf 1800 m (Firm)	Sweet Pea Stakes	Open	Tokyo	2.2 (1st)	18	1st	1:48.4	Masaru Honda	–0.1	(Yamanin Fabuleux)	
May 21	Turf 2400 m (Firm)	Yushun Himba	GI	Tokyo	6.7 (3rd)	18	1st	2:26.2	Masaru Honda	–0.1	(Fusaichi Pandora)	
Oct 15	Turf 2000 m (Firm)	Shūka Shō	GI	Kyoto	3.6 (2nd)	18	1st	1:58.2	Masaru Honda	–0.1	(Asahi Rising)	
Nov 12	Turf 2200 m (Firm)	Queen Elizabeth II Cup	GI	Kyoto	2.7 (1st)	15	12th (demoted)	2:11.4	Masaru Honda	–	Fusaichi Pandora	
2007 – four-year-old season
May 13	Turf 1600 m (Firm)	Victoria Mile	GI	Tokyo	2.1 (1st)	18	10th	1:33.4	Koshiro Take	0.9	Koiuta	
Jun 24	Turf 2200 m (Good)	Takarazuka Kinen	GI	Hanshin	10.2 (6th)	18	6th	2:13.2	Koshiro Take	0.8	Admire Moon	
2008 – five-year-old season
May 31	Turf 2000 m (Good)	Kinko Sho	GII	Chukyo	10.0 (5th)	17	3rd	1:59.3	Koshiro Take	0.2	Eishin Deputy	
Oct 19	Turf 1800 m (Firm)	Fuchu Himba Stakes	GIII	Tokyo	2.3 (1st)	18	2nd	1:45.6	Norihiro Yokoyama	0.1	Blumenblatt	
Nov 16	Turf 2200 m (Firm)	Queen Elizabeth II Cup	GI	Kyoto	1.8 (1st)	18	2nd	2:12.3	Norihiro Yokoyama	0.2	Little Amapola	
Dec 28	Turf 2500 m (Firm)	Arima Kinen	GI	Nakayama	19.0 (6th)	14	7th	2:32.5	Norihiro Yokoyama	1.0	Daiwa Scarlet	
2009 – six-year-old season
Feb 21	Turf 2200 m (Firm)	Kyōto Kinen	GII	Kyoto	3.3 (2nd)	12	4th	2:14.9	Norihiro Yokoyama	0.3	Asakusa Kings	
Apr 5	Turf 2000 m (Firm)	Sankei Shō Ōsaka Hai	GII	Hanshin	11.5 (4th)	12	3rd	2:00.0	Norihiro Yokoyama	0.3	Dream Journey	
May 17	Turf 1600 m (Firm)	Victoria Mile	GI	Tokyo	7.1 (2nd)	18	8th	1:33.9	Norihiro Yokoyama	1.5	Vodka	
Oct 18	Turf 1800 m (Firm)	Fuchu Himba Stakes	GIII	Tokyo	4.4 (1st)	18	6th	1:45.5	Norihiro Yokoyama	0.9	Mood Indigo	
Nov 15	Turf 2200 m (Firm)	Queen Elizabeth II Cup	GI	Kyoto	15.1 (5th)	18	9th	2:15.2	Norihiro Yokoyama	1.6	Queen Spumante	

== Pedigree ==
Pedigree of Kawakami Princess (JPN), bay filly, 2003
Sire King Halo (JPN) 1995	Dancing Brave (USA); 1983	Lyphard	Northern Dancer
Sire King Halo (JPN) 1995	Dancing Brave (USA); 1983	Lyphard	Goofed
Sire King Halo (JPN) 1995	Dancing Brave (USA); 1983	Navajo Princess	Drone
Sire King Halo (JPN) 1995	Dancing Brave (USA); 1983	Navajo Princess	Olmec
Sire King Halo (JPN) 1995	Goodbye Halo (USA); 1985	Halo	Hail to Reason
Sire King Halo (JPN) 1995	Goodbye Halo (USA); 1985	Halo	Cosmah
Sire King Halo (JPN) 1995	Goodbye Halo (USA); 1985	Pound Foolish	Sir Ivor
Sire King Halo (JPN) 1995	Goodbye Halo (USA); 1985	Pound Foolish	Squander
Dam Takano Secretary (USA) 1996	Seattle Slew (USA); 1974	Bold Reasoning	Boldnesian
Dam Takano Secretary (USA) 1996	Seattle Slew (USA); 1974	Bold Reasoning	Reason to Earn
Dam Takano Secretary (USA) 1996	Seattle Slew (USA); 1974	My Charmer	Poker
Dam Takano Secretary (USA) 1996	Seattle Slew (USA); 1974	My Charmer	Fair Charmer
Dam Takano Secretary (USA) 1996	Summer Secretary (USA); 1985	Secretariat	Bold Ruler
Dam Takano Secretary (USA) 1996	Summer Secretary (USA); 1985	Secretariat	Somethingroyal
Dam Takano Secretary (USA) 1996	Summer Secretary (USA); 1985	Golden Summer	Key to the Mint
Dam Takano Secretary (USA) 1996	Summer Secretary (USA); 1985	Golden Summer	Summer Guest

- Kawakami Princess is inbred 4 × 5 to Hail to Reason, 4 × 5 to Bold Ruler, and 5 × 5 to Sir Gaylord.
- Her dam's granddam Golden Summer was a daughter of Key to the Mint and Summer Guest, the 1972 Coaching Club American Oaks winner.

== See also ==
- Thoroughbred racing in Japan
- Yushun Himba
- Shūka Shō
