= King Halo =

Japanese thoroughbred racehorse

King Halo キングヘイロー
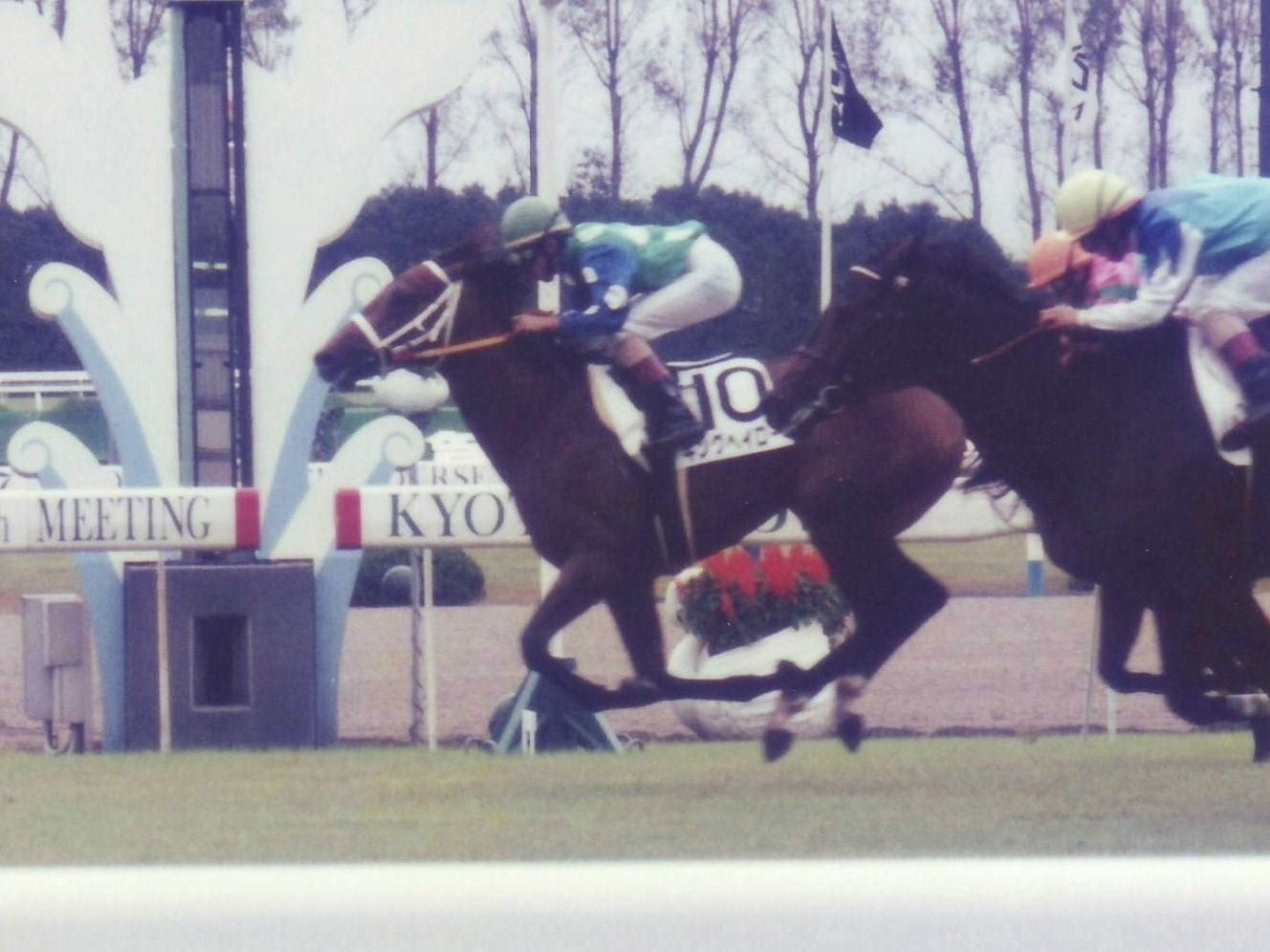
- King Halo winning his maiden race on October 5, 1997.
- Breed: Thoroughbred
- Sire: Dancing Brave (USA)
- Grandsire: Lyphard (USA)
- Dam: Goodbye Halo (USA)
- Damsire: Halo (USA)
- Sex: Stallion
- Foaled: April 28, 1995
- Died: March 19, 2019 (aged 23)
- Country: Japan
- Color: Bay
- Breeder: Kyowa Bokujo
- Owner: Kichio Asakawa
- Racing colors
- Trainer: Masahiro Sakaguchi
- Jockey: Yuichi Fukunaga; Yoshitomi Shibata
- Record: 27:6-4-4-13
- Earnings: ¥500,266,000

Major wins
- Tokyo Sports Hai Sansai Stakes (1997); Tokyo Shimbun Hai (1999); Nakayama Kinen (1999); Takamatsunomiya Kinen (2000)

King Halo (Japanese: キングヘイロー, Hepburn: Kingu Heirō; April 28, 1995 – March 19, 2019) was a Japanese Thoroughbred racehorse and sire.

King Halo won the GI 2000 Takamatsunomiya Kinen, as well as the GII 1999 Nakayama Kinen and the GIII 1997 Tokyo Sports Hai Sansai Stakes and 1999 Tokyo Shimbun Hai. The horse also showed strength in other distances, as he had come in fifth in the 1998 Kikuka-shō. After retiring from racing, King Halo had a successful stud career.

== Racing career ==
=== 1997: Two-year old season ===
King Halo was sired by Dancing Brave, who was touted to be one of Europe's strongest horse in the 1980s, out of Goodbye Halo, who had won 7 GI races in the United States. According to King Halo's jockey, Yuichi Fukunaga, the horse was originally scheduled to be ridden by Yutaka Take. However, the schedule could not be kept as he decided to ride Genuine instead for the Mainichi Okan, which was held at a different race track. When Take called in to tell Masahiro Sakaguchi, King Halo's trainer, that he couldn't make the race, Fukunaga just so happened to be present, and was asked if he could ride the horse, to which he accepted. From the horse's debut race, Fukunaga, who was only in his second year as a jockey at the time, would ride King Halo for all of his three year old races except for one.

After winning both his debut race and the Kigiku Sho, the horse moved on to the Tokyo Sports Hai Sansai Stakes, which he also won with a two-and-a-half-lengths lead against second place horse Meiner Love. This was the first group race victory for both the horse and jockey. The horse would become the favored at the Radio Tampa Hai Sansai Stakes, but finished second after Lord Ax passed him on the final stretch.

=== 1998: Three-year old season ===
King Halo started the season with the Yayoi Sho, which was a trial race for the Satsuki Sho. The horse was the most favored here as well, but couldn't catch runner Seiun Sky or Kisaragi Sho winner Special Week, finishing third with a four-length gap behind the two. At the Satsuki Sho, King Halo ran in front of Special Week and tried to catch up on Seiun Sky but was unable to catch up, finishing at second place. At the following Tōkyō Yūshun, King Halo took the lead and ran, but as the race became the second fastest pace at the time, the horse lost momentum at the final stretch, finishing at an unimpressive 14th place.

In autumn, the horse was briefly ridden by Yukio Okabe for the Kobe Shimbun Hai, where the horse went neck-and-neck with Bold Emperor but finished 3rd. Later at the Kyoto Shimbun Hai, the horse pressured Special Week but lost to him by a neck. Later, he did not perform well at the long-distance races, with him finishing 5th at the Kikuka Sho and 6th at the Arima Kinen.

=== 1999: Four-year old season ===
King Halo won two group races in a row in the 1999 season, the Tokyo Shimbun Hai and Nakayama Kinen, with Yoshitomi Shibata as his new jockey. It was hoped that the horse would become the face of the mile races after Taiki Shuttle retired, but failed to do so as he finished 11th at the Yasuda Kinen and 8th at Takarazuka Kinen. Norihiro Yokoyama rode King Halo for the Mainichi Okan but finished 5th, and the horse returned to Shibata for the Autumn Tenno Sho but finished 7th, leading to the horse to return to Fukunaga for the Mile Championship. In anticipation for the race, Fukunaga shaved his head to show commitment. However, while they were able to pass Take's Black Hawk, he was unable to beat Air Jihad. Fukunaga continued to ride King Halo for the following Sprinters Stakes, but finished third behind Black Hawk and Agnes World.

=== 2000: Five-year old season ===
King Halo's first race of the season was the February Stakes. He was the most favored given his pedigree and hopes for paving a new path. However, the horse was in post position 1, which meant that the horse would have sand all over him, leading to the horse to not go forward, leading to the horse to finish at 13th place. Sakaguchi was met with criticism over this, but his desire to make the horse a GI horse was unwavering. For the next Takamatsunomiya Kinen, the horse returned to Shibata, who won the race from the outside passing the likes of Agnes World and Black Hawk at the very last moment. Sakaguchi had cried in front of the camera upon the victory. In a twist of irony, King Halo's original jockey, Fukunaga, was riding the second-place horse, Divine Light.

After the Takamatsunomiya Kinen, the horse came in third at the Yasuda Kinen, the highest for any Japanese horse of that race, with Fukunaga back as his jockey. In autumn, Shibata once again rode King Halo, but did not make an impressive showing with him finishing 7th on both the Sprinters Stakes and the Mile Championship. However, drove itself in to fourth place at his final race, the Arima Kinen.

While King Halo was only able to win a sprint race out of all of his GI races, the horse was able to show mixed results for mile, medium, and stayer races.

== Post-retirement ==
King Halo entered stud in 2001 at the Yushun Stallion Station. With the horse's pedigree and service fee of around 1,000,000 JPY, the horse covered over a hundred mares per year; leading to the horse entering 5th place in the First Season Sire Ranking of 2004. One of the horse's first year crop, Nishino Dokomademo, won an open race, before finishing second at the Aoba Sho and going on to finish 6th at the Japanese Derby. Later on, Go Go Kirishima won the 2006 Shinzan Kinen, marking the first time a King Halo crop won a group race. Later on that same year, Kawakami Princess won the Yushun Himba, becoming the first King Halo crop to win a GI race. The horse then went on to win the Shūka Sho undefeated, and went on to finish first the Queen Elizabeth II Cup before being dropped to 12th due to interference. In 2009 Laurel Guerreiro won the Takamatsunomiya Kinen, the same race his sire won nine years prior.

With the horse running in various distances, King Halo has sired various types of horses. Similarly, the horses King Halo sired was stronger in the winter season and weaker in the summer season. On top of that, many of his sires run with his neck high. King Halo's service fee went up as his crops won races, with the service fee for 2007 going up to 3,500,000JPY after Kawakami Princess (among others) won numerous races.

The 12th race held at Chukyo Racecourse on March 28, 2010, which was designated as a JRA Premium Race, King Halo earned the most votes, and as such was given the sub-name "King Halo Memorial".

On March 19, 2019, King Halo died due to old age at the Yushun Stallion Station (Niikappu, Hokkaido). Five days later, Yuichi Fukunaga won the 49th Takamatsunomiya Kinen with Mr Melody, a victory which Fukunaga dedicated to his former partner.

== Stud statistics ==
=== GI race winners ===
Bold indicates a GI race

- 2003:
  - Kawakami Princess (**Yushun Himba**, **Shūka Sho**)
- 2004:
  - Laurel Guerreiro (**Sprinters Stakes**, **Takamatsunomiya Kinen**, Tokyo Shimbun Hai, Hankyu Hai)
- 2008:
  - Medeia (**JBC Ladies' Classic**, Ladies Prelude, TCK Jo O Hai (Twice), Marine Cup, Sparking Lady Cup）

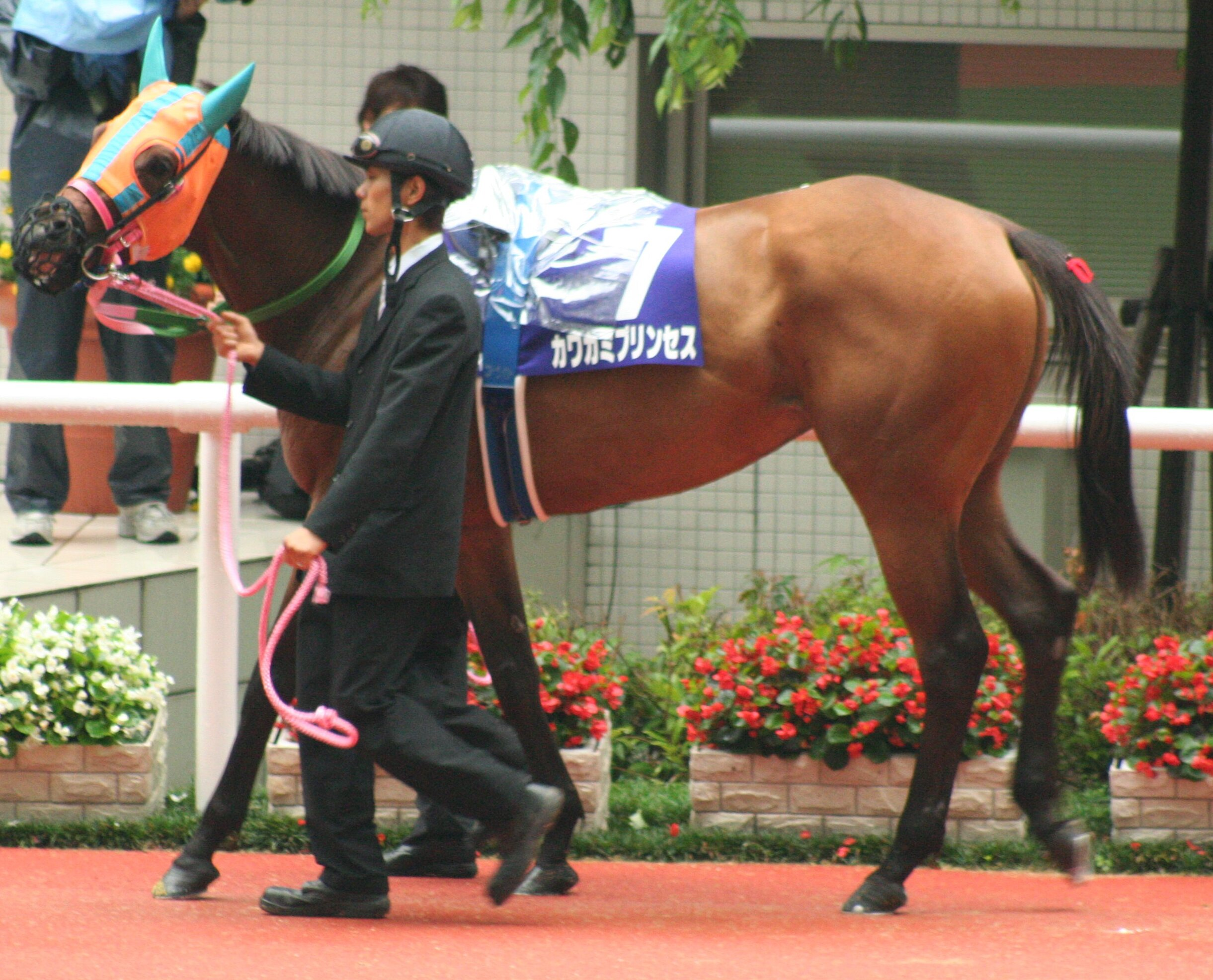
Kawakami Princess

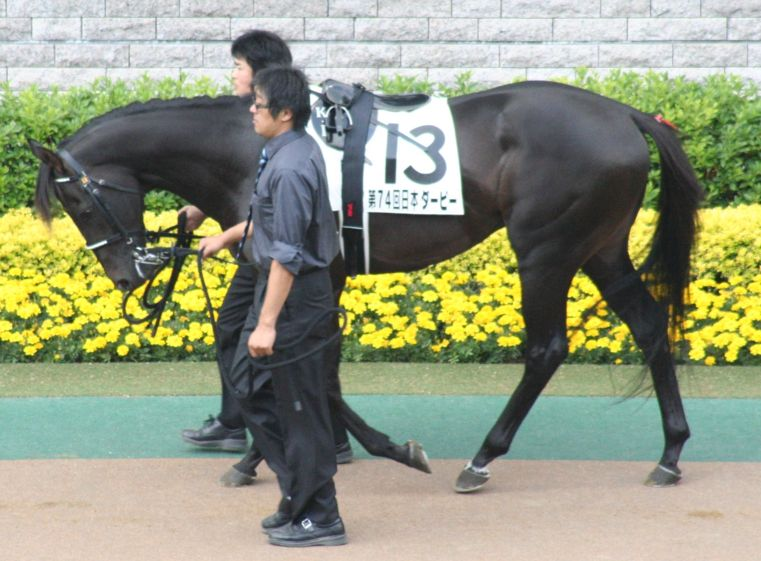
Laurel Guerreiro

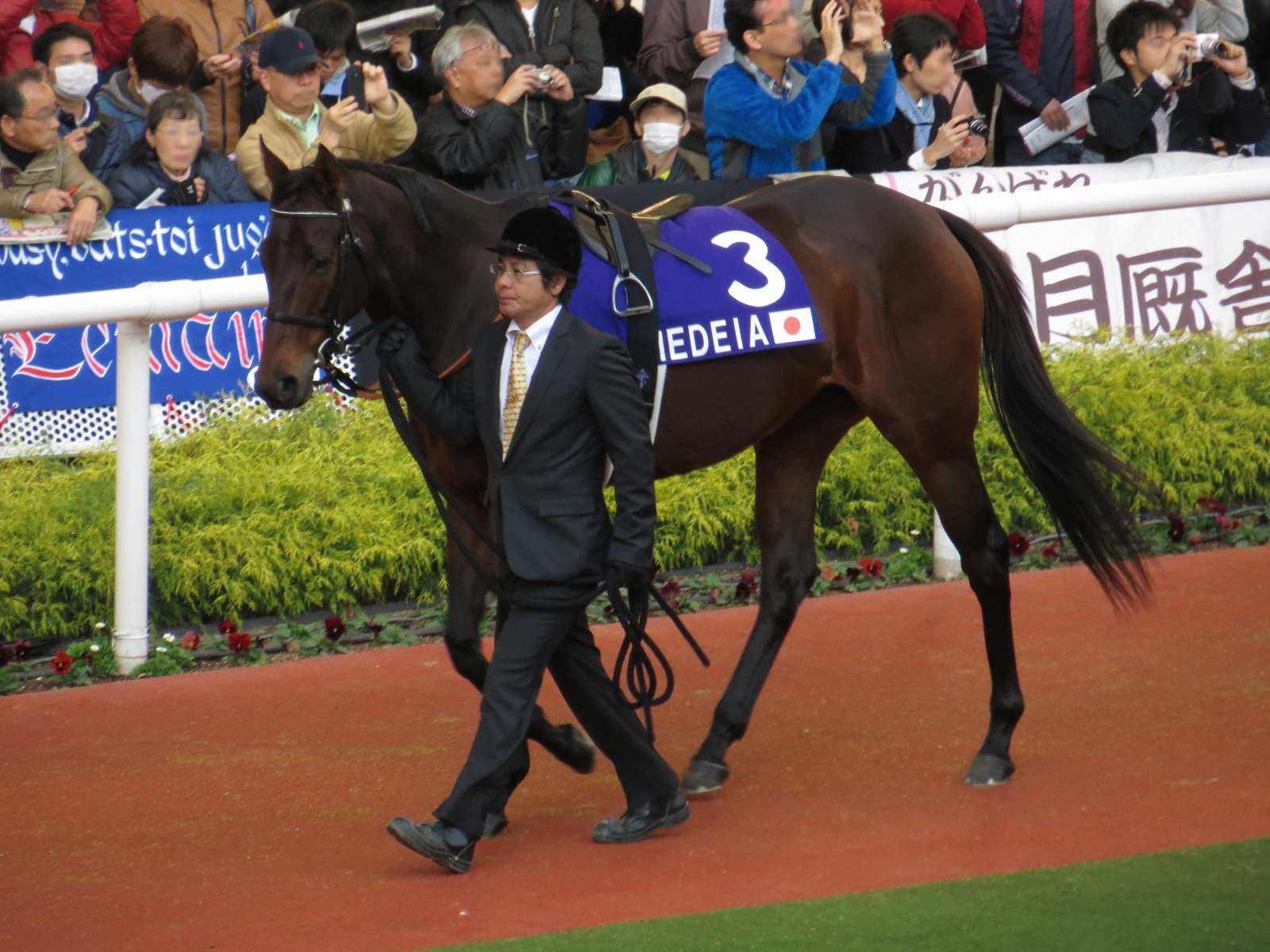
Medeia

=== Group Race winners ===
*indicates NAR group races

- 2002:
  - King's Zone (Summer Champion, Autumn Sprint Cup*, Mile Souha* (Four times winner), Tokai Oka Sho*, Michinoku Daishoten*, Shian Mor Kinen*, Nagoya Kinen*, Meiko Hai*)
- 2003:
  - Kikuno Arrow (Diolite Kinen)
  - Go Go Kirishima (Shinzan Kinen)
- 2009:
  - Courir Kaiser (American Jockey Club Cup)
- 2010:
  - Kitasan Mikazuki (Tokyo Hai (twice), Tokyo Sprint, Platina Cup*, After 5 Star Sho* (Three times), NAR Grand Prix 2018 Horse of the Year/Best older colt/Best sprinter
  - Chateau Blanche (Mermaid Stakes)
- 2013:
  - Diana Halo (Hanshin Cup, Kitakyushu Kinen, Hankyu Hai
  - Daimei Princess (Ibis Summer Dash, Kitakyushu Kinen)
- 2015:
  - Vision of Love (Shiori Stakes)
- 2018:
  - Reframing (Kokura Kinen)

=== NAR Group Race winners ===
- 2002:
  - Queen of Queen (Gold Junior, Wakakusa Sho, Spring Cup, Tokai Kikuka Sho, March Cup, Hyogo Queen Cup, Spring Soha, Oguri Cap Kinen, Beautiful Dreamer Cup)
- 2004:
  - Saint Sailing (Iwate Derby Diamond Cup, Kozukata Sho, Akuriguro Sho, Kinpai (Iwate Keiba)）
- 2006:
  - King Bamboo（Hochi Grand Prix Cup）
  - Maruhachi Getty（Toreno Sho, Kinpai (Fukuyama Keiba)）
- 2007:
  - Shining Sayaka (Beautiful Dreamer Cup)
  - Mayano Ryujin (MRO Kinsho)
- 2008:
  - Oe Raijin (Hyogo Wakagoma Sho, Sonoda Junior Cup, Sonoda Youth Cup, Hyogo Derby, Kuroshio Hai, Gifu Kinpai, Hyogo Daishoten (Twice), Sonoda Kinpai, Hochi Allstar Cup)
- 2009:
  - Ju One Bright (Princess Cup, Young Champion)
  - Kikuno Grado (Owari Nagoya Hai)
  - Musashi King O (Katsushima Okan)
  - Memory Jitterbug (Hakugin Soha, Tokai Gold Cup, Autumn Cup, Winter Soha, March Cup)
- 2010:
  - Ichiryu (Oka Sho (Urawa))
- 2011:
  - Watari King O (Crown Cup)
- 2014:
  - King Jaguar (Yamabiko Sho, Iwate Derby Diamond Cup, Ihatov Mile, Kozukata Sho)
  - Rice Eight (Kanazawa Sprint Cup)
- 2016:
  - Matsurida Leben (Opal Cup)
- 2017:
  - Ichi Raijin (Sonoda Junior Cup)
- 2018:
  - Giga King (Nanbu Koma Sho, Tokyo-wan Cup, Derby Grand Prix, Hochi Grand Prix Cup (twice), Furioso Legend Cup)

=== Damsires ===
- 2011:
  - King's Guard (2017 Procyon Stakes) by Sinister Minister
- 2014:
  - Jo Strictly (2017 New Zealand Trophy by Jo Cappuchino
- 2017:
  - Deep Bond (2020 Kyoto Shimbun Hai, 2021 and 2022 Hanshin Daishoten, 2021 Prix Foy) by Kizuna
  - Coral Tsukki (2019 Edelweiss Sho) by Sinister Minister
- 2018:
  - Pixie Knight (2021 Shinzan Kinen and **Sprinters Stakes**）by Maurice
  - Weiss Meteor (2021 Radio Nikkei Sho) by King Kamehameha
  - Meisho Murakumo (2021 Leopard Stakes) by Neo Universe
  - Asamano Itazura (2021 St Lite Kinen) by Victoire Pisa
  - Diktaean (2023 Urawa Kinen, 2023 Nagoya Grandprix, 2024 Hakusan Daishoten, 2025 Korea Cup, 2025 **Tokyo Daishoten**) by King Kamehameha
- 2019:
  - Water Navillera (2021 Fantasy Stakes) by Silver State
  - Equinox (2021 Tokyo Sports Hai Nisai Stakes, 2022 2023 **Tenno Sho (Autumn)**, 2022 **Arima Kinen**, 2023 **Dubai Sheema Classic**, 2023 **Takarazuka Kinen**, 2023 **Japan Cup**) by Kitasan Black
  - King's Sword (2023 **JBC Classic**, 2024 **Teio Sho**) by Sinister Minister
  - Feengrotten (2022 Radio Nikkei Sho) by Black Tide
- 2020:
  - Dura (2022 Sapporo Nisai Stakes, 2023 Queen Stakes) by Duramente
- 2022:
  - Matenro Command (2025 Hyogo Championship, 2026 Kurofune Sho, 2026 Tokai Stakes) by Drefong

== In popular culture ==
An anthropomorphized version of King Halo appears as a character in the Japanese multimedia franchise Umamusume: Pretty Derby, voiced by Iori Saeki. While outwardly appearing as a haughty and confident competitor, inwardly King Halo suffers from generational trauma due to her mother, a retired champion runner, being emotionally neglectful and the harshest critic of her racing career. However, this trauma instead gave King Halo great empathy and compassion, as seen in her becoming a pseudo-maternal figure for her roommate Haru Urara and her fan club of junior Tracen Academy students led by Kawakami Princess, who was sired by her real-life counterpart.

== Racing form ==
Date	Age	Racecourse	Race	Group	Odds （Favored）	Finished	Track and Distance	Time	Jockey	Weight	Winner (2nd Place)
Oct 5, 1997	2	Kyoto	Maiden Race		2.9（2nd）	1st	Turf 1600m	1:37.0	Yuichi Fukunaga	53	（Admire Dios）
Oct 25, 1997	2	Kyoto	Kigiku Sho	Allowance (1 Win)	5.6（3rd）	1st	Turf 1800m	1:48.8	Yuichi Fukunaga	53	（Koei Tenkaichi）
Nov 15, 1997	2	Tokyo	Tokyo Sports Hai Sansai Stakes	GIII	2.4（1st）	1st	Turf 1800m	R1:48.0	Yuichi Fukunaga	54	（Meiner Love）
Dec 22, 1997	2	Hanshin	Radio Tampa Hai Sansai Stakes	GIII	1.4（1st）	2nd	Turf 2000m	2:04.0	Yuichi Fukunaga	54	Lord Ax
Mar 8, 1998	3	Nakayama	Yayoi Sho	GII	2.1（1st）	3rd	Turf 2000m	2:02.6	Yuichi Fukunaga	55	Special Week
Apr 19, 1998	3	Nakayama	Satsuki Sho	GI	6.8（3rd）	2nd	Turf 2000m	2:01.4	Yuichi Fukunaga	57	Seiun Sky
Jun 7, 1998	3	Tokyo	Tōkyō Yūshun	GI	3.9（2nd）	14th	Turf 2400m	2:28.4	Yuichi Fukunaga	57	Special Week
Sep 20, 1998	3	Hanshin	Kobe Shimbun Hai	GII	1.9（1st）	3rd	Turf 2000m	2:02.2	Yukio Okabe	57	Kanetoshi Governor
Oct 18, 1998	3	Kyoto	Kyoto Shimbun Hai	GII	8.4（3rd）	2nd	Turf 2200m	2:15.1	Yuichi Fukunaga	57	Special Week
Nov 8, 1998	3	Kyoto	Kikuka-shō	GI	10.3（3rd）	5th	Turf 3000m	3:03.9	Yuichi Fukunaga	57	Seiun Sky
Dec 27, 1998	3	Nakayama	Arima Kinen	GI	26.7（10th）	6th	Turf 2500m	2:32.9	Yuichi Fukunaga	55	Grass Wonder
Feb 7, 1999	4	Tokyo	Tokyo Shimbun Hai	GIII	2.1（1st）	1st	Turf 1600m	1:33.5	Yoshitomi Shibata	57	（Keiwan Viking）
Mar 14, 1999	4	Nakayama	Nakayama Kinen	GII	1.8（1st）	1st	Turf 1800m	1:47.5	Yoshitomi Shibata	57	（Daiwa Texas）
Jun 13, 1999	4	Tokyo	Yasuda Kinen	GI	6.0（2nd）	11th	Turf 1600m	1:35.1	Yoshitomi Shibata	58	Air Jihad
Jul 11, 1999	4	Hanshin	Takarazuka Kinen	GI	26.7（5th）	8th	Turf 2200m	2:14.6	Yoshitomi Shibata	58	Grass Wonder
Oct 10, 1999	4	Tokyo	Mainichi Ōkan	GII	10.5（2nd）	5th	Turf 1800m	1:46.2	Norihiro Yokoyama	58	Grass Wonder
Oct 31, 1999	4	Tokyo	Tenno Sho (Autumn)	GI	4.3（3rd）	7th	Turf 2000m	1:58.6	Yoshitomi Shibata	58	Special Week
Nov 21, 1999	4	Kyoto	Mile Championship	GI	8.0（4th）	2nd	Turf 1600m	1:33.0	Yuichi Fukunaga	57	Air Jihad
Dec 19, 1999	4	Nakayama	Sprinters Stakes	GI	7.8（4th）	3rd	Turf 1200m	1:08.4	Yuichi Fukunaga	57	Black Hawk
Feb 20, 2000	5	Tokyo	February Stakes	GI	5.1（1st）	13th	Dirt 1600m	1:37.2	Yoshitomi Shibata	57	Wing Arrow
Mar 26, 2000	5	Chukyo	Takamatsunomiya Kinen	GI	12.7（4th）	1st	Turf 1200m	1:08.6	Yoshitomi Shibata	57	（Divine Light）
May 14, 2000	5	Tokyo	Keio Hai Spring Cup	GII	6.5（3rd）	11th	Turf 1400m	1:22.0	Yoshitomi Shibata	59	Stinger
Jun 4, 2000	5	Tokyo	Yasuda Kinen	GI	7.7（3rd）	3rd	Turf 1600m	1:34.1	Yuichi Fukunaga	58	Fairy King Prawn
Oct 1, 2000	5	Nakayama	Sprinters Stakes	GI	15.0（6th）	7th	Turf 1200m	1:09.6	Yoshitomi Shibata	57	Daitaku Yamato
Oct 28, 2000	5	Kyoto	Swan Stakes	GII	5.2（3rd）	12th	Turf 1400m	1:21.5	Yoshitomi Shibata	59	Daitaku Yamato
Nov 19, 2000	5	Kyoto	Mile Championship	GI	7.7（5th）	7th	Turf 1600m	1:33.2	Yoshitomi Shibata	57	Agnes Digital
Dec 24, 2000	5	Nakayama	Arima Kinen	GI	39.9（9th）	4th	Turf 2500m	2:34.3	Yoshitomi Shibata	56	T M Opera O

- The R indicates a record victory

== Pedigree ==
Pedigree of King Halo
Sire Dancing Brave (USA) b. 1983	Lyphard (USA) b. 1969	Northern Dancer (CAN)	Nearctic (CAN)
Sire Dancing Brave (USA) b. 1983	Lyphard (USA) b. 1969	Northern Dancer (CAN)	Natalma (USA)
Sire Dancing Brave (USA) b. 1983	Lyphard (USA) b. 1969	Goofed (USA)	Court Martial (GB)
Sire Dancing Brave (USA) b. 1983	Lyphard (USA) b. 1969	Goofed (USA)	Barra (FR)
Sire Dancing Brave (USA) b. 1983	Navajo Princess (USA) b. 1974	Drone (USA)	Sir Gaylord (USA)
Sire Dancing Brave (USA) b. 1983	Navajo Princess (USA) b. 1974	Drone (USA)	Cap and Bells (USA)
Sire Dancing Brave (USA) b. 1983	Navajo Princess (USA) b. 1974	Olmec (USA)	Pago Pago (AUS)
Sire Dancing Brave (USA) b. 1983	Navajo Princess (USA) b. 1974	Olmec (USA)	Chocolate Beau (USA)
Dam Goodbye Halo (USA) ch. 1985	Halo (USA) d.b. 1969	Hail to Reason (USA)	Turn-to (IRE)
Dam Goodbye Halo (USA) ch. 1985	Halo (USA) d.b. 1969	Hail to Reason (USA)	Nothirdchance (USA)
Dam Goodbye Halo (USA) ch. 1985	Halo (USA) d.b. 1969	Cosmah (USA)	Cosmic Bomb (USA)
Dam Goodbye Halo (USA) ch. 1985	Halo (USA) d.b. 1969	Cosmah (USA)	Almahmoud (USA)
Dam Goodbye Halo (USA) ch. 1985	Pound Foolish (USA) b. 1979	Sir Ivor (USA)	Sir Gaylord (USA)
Dam Goodbye Halo (USA) ch. 1985	Pound Foolish (USA) b. 1979	Sir Ivor (USA)	Attica (USA)
Dam Goodbye Halo (USA) ch. 1985	Pound Foolish (USA) b. 1979	Squander (USA)	Buckpasser (USA)
Dam Goodbye Halo (USA) ch. 1985	Pound Foolish (USA) b. 1979	Squander (USA)	Discipline
