= Agnes World =

American-bred Thoroughbred racehorse

Agnes World アグネスワールド
- Agnes World racing at the 1999 CBC Sho.
- Breed: Thoroughbred
- Sire: Danzig
- Grandsire: Northern Dancer
- Dam: Mysteries
- Damsire: Seattle Slew
- Sex: Stallion
- Foaled: 28 April 1995
- Country: United States
- Colour: Dark Bay or Brown
- Breeder: Calumet Farm
- Owner: Takao Watanabe; Takao Watanabe & Teruya Yoshida
- Racing colours
- Trainer: Hideyuki Mori
- Jockey: Yutaka Take
- Record: 20: 8-6-1
- Earnings: Japan: 348,409,000 ¥ Overseas: $3,365,680

Major wins
- Hakodate Sansai Stakes (1997); Zen-Nippon Sansai Yushun (1997); Prix de l'Abbaye de Longchamp (1999); CBC Sho (1999); July Cup (2000)

Agnes World (Japanese: アグネスワールド, Hepburn: Agunesu Wārudo; 28 April 1995 – 20 August 2012) was an American-bred, Japanese-trained Thoroughbred racehorse and sire, best known for his performances over sprint distances in Europe. Bred in Kentucky, he was sold for over $1 million as a yearling and exported to Japan.

As a juvenile in 1997 he won three of his four races including the Grade III Hakodate Sansai Stakes, but was off the course for almost a year after sustaining an injury in early 1998. In 1999 he showed winning form over sprint distances in Japan before being sent to France, where he won the Prix de l'Abbaye in October. He remained in training as a five-year-old and showed his best form yet in Europe, winning the July Cup, becoming the first Japanese-trained horse to win a race in the United Kingdom. He was retired to stud at the end of the season and stood as a breeding stallion in Japan, the United Kingdom, and Australia.

== Background ==
Agnes World was a dark bay or brown horse bred in Kentucky by Calumet Farm. He had a small, irregular white star in the shape of a "<" and two white socks. His sire Danzig, who ran only three times before his career was ended by injury, was a highly successful stallion who sired the winners of more than fifty Grade I/Group One races. His offspring include the champions Chief's Crown, Dayjur and Lure as well as Danehill, leading breeding sire and member of the Australian Racing Hall of Fame. Agnes World's dam, Mysteries, failed to win a race, but showed high-class form when finishing third to Snow Bride in the Musidora Stakes. As a broodmare she also produced Hishi Akebono and Mysterial, the dam of Dubai Destination.

As a yearling, the colt was sent to the Keeneland July sale and was bought for $1,050,000 by Takao Watanabe. He was exported to Japan and sent into training with Hideyuki Mori. He was ridden in most of his races by Yutaka Take.

== Racing career ==
=== 1997 & 1998: early career ===
Agnes World began his racing career with a win in a maiden race over 1200 metres at Hakodate Racecourse on 7 June 1997. In July he was stepped up in class for the Grade III Hakodate Sansai Stakes over the same course and distance and won again, beating Saratoga Beauty in a record time of 1:09.8. After the mid-season break, the colt returned to contest Japan's most prestigious race for two-year-olds, the Grade I Asahi Hai Futurity Stakes over 1600 metres at Nakayama Racecourse and finished fourth behind Grass Wonder. On his final start of the year, Agnes World won over 1600 metres on dirt at Kawasaki Racecourse on 27 December.

On his three-year-old debut, Agnes World finished second to Dantsu Sirius in the Grade III Nikkan Sports Sho Shinzan Kinen at Kyoto Racecourse in January, but was subsequently injured and missed the rest of the season.

=== 1999: four-year-old season ===
After an absence of almost a year, Agnes World returned to finish sixth in the Grade III Garnet Stakes at Nakayama on 18 January and then finished second in a minor stakes race over 1200 metres at Kyoto. In April, over the same course and distance, he finished second to Meiner Love in the Grade III Silk Road Stakes. For his next two races he was moved up to the highest class: he finished fifth to Masa Lucky in the Takamatsunomiya Kinen at Chukyo and eighth behind Air Jihad in the Yasuda Kinen at Tokyo Racecourse. The colt returned to winning form when he was dropped in class for two sprint races at Kokura Racecourse. In July he won the Kitakyushu Tankyori Stakes in a record time of 1:06.5 and in the following month he added a win in the Kokura Nikkei Open.

After his wins at Kokura, Agnes World, accompanied by his stablemate Dojima Muteki, was sent to Europe to be prepared for a run in the Group One Prix de l'Abbaye at Longchamp Racecourse on 3 October. He entered the race without a prep race in Europe and was racing over 1000 metres, a distance he had never previously attempted. The Godolphin colt Bertolini started favourite ahead of Sainte Marine (Prix du Gros Chêne) and Imperial Beauty (World Trophy) with the Japanese duo next in the betting on 6.8/1. The other runners included Keos (Prix de Ris-Orangis, Prix de Seine-et-Oise), Arkadian Hero (Mill Reef Stakes), Black Rock Desert (Prix de Saint-Georges), Mitcham (King's Stand Stakes), Averti (King George Stakes), Sampower Star (Duke of York Stakes) and Yorkies Boy (Palace House Stakes). Agnes World was always among the leaders and went to the front approaching the last 400 metres. He was driven out by Yutaka Take to win by a short neck from Imperial Beauty with Keos a length and half way in third place.

Agnes World returned to Japan for his last two races of 1999. At Kokura in November he recorded his first major win in Japan for sixteen months when he defeated Masa Lucky by half a length in the Grade II CBC Sho. On his final appearance of the season he contested the Sprinters Stakes in December and finished second, beaten a neck by the five-year-old Black Hawk.

=== 2000: five-year-old season ===
On his first run as a five-year-old Agnes World made his second attempt to win the Takamatsunomiya Kinen and finished third, beaten a neck and the same by King Halo and Divine Light.

In the summer of 2000, the horse was sent to Europe to contest two major sprint races in the United Kingdom. He was again accompanied by Dojima Muteki as well as Air Shakur who was being prepared for a run in the King George VI and Queen Elizabeth Stakes. At Royal Ascot on 20 June, a week after his arrival in Britain, he started a 16/1 outsider in a twenty-three runner field for the King's Stand Stakes and finished second, one and a half lengths behind Nuclear Debate. On 13 July at Newmarket Racecourse, Agnes World started 4/1 favourite for the July Cup over six furlongs. On the eve of the race Masa Matsuda, who had handled the horse's preparation was interviewed by The Guardian and said "at three and four years, he was good at home when he galloped, but when he got to the races he was like a child, because he was very nervous. All the time he was biting me or kicking me. But now he is like an adult. He is more relaxed when he goes racing, and is getting better all the time". Agnes World's main rivals in the betting were Lincoln Dancer (Sandy Lane Stakes), Primo Valentino (Middle Park Stakes), Lend A Hand (Gran Criterium, Hungerford Stakes, Duke of York Stakes), Monashee Mountain (Tetrarch Stakes) and Pipalong (Palace House Stakes). Yutaka Take tracked the leaders as Primo Valentino made the running before making his challenge in the last quarter mile. Lincoln Dancer took the lead a furlong out, but Agnes World overhauled the leader in the final strides to win by a short head, with Pipalong another short head away in third. His victory was the first Group One victory in Britain for a horse trained in Japan. Commenting through an interpreter, Take said "My horse felt good before the race so I felt confident. I always thought he would be good enough. It is a great pleasure for me to win and I am very happy". The JRA spokesman Yukio Nakayama said "It was 130 years ago that the British people introduced horseracing to Japan. We have imported many, many horses from here, and now we have won a race here".

Agnes World returned to Japan for the Sprinters' Stakes on 1 October in which he finished strongly to take second, one and a half lengths behind the front-running 257/1 outsider Daitaku Yamato. In November, the horse was sent to the United States to contest the Breeders' Cup Sprint at Churchill Downs. Racing on dirt for the first time since December 1997 he never looked likely to win and finished eighth of the fourteen runners behind Kona Gold.

== Racing form ==
The data available is based on JBIS, netkeiba and Racing Post.

Date	Track	Race	Grade	Distance (Condition)	Entry	HN	Odds (Favored)	Finish	Time	Margins	Jockey	Winner (Runner-up)
1997 – two-year-old season
Jun 7	Hakodate	3YO debut		1200m（Firm）	7	7	1.9（1）	1st	1:11.0	−0.8	Yutaka Take	(Meiner Classic)
Jul 27	Hakodate	Hakodate Sansai Stakes	3	1200m（Firm）	10	7	2.0（2）	1st	1:09.8	−0.3	Yutaka Take	(Saratoga Beauty)
Dec 7	Nakayama	Asahi Hai Sansai Stakes	1	1600m（Firm）	15	2	12.0（3）	4th	1:34.7	1.1	Yutaka Take	Grass Wonder
Dec 29	Kawasaki	Zen-Nippon Sansai Yushun	Jpn2 (Note: The Zen-Nippon Sansai Yushun is classified as a local, Japanese Group 2 event. Internationally as a Listed event.)	1600m（Fast)	11	6	0.0（1）	1st	1:41.7	–0.5	Yutaka Take	(Intelli Power)
1998 – three-year-old season
Jan 18	Kyoto	Shinzan Kinen	3	1600m（Heavy）	15	5	1.4（1）	2nd	1:37.7	0.9	Yutaka Take	Dantsu Sirius
1999 – four-year-old season
Jan 10	Nakayama	Garnet Stakes	3	1200m (Fast）	16	4	37.5（8）	6th	1:11.1	0.8	Norihiro Yokoyama	Washington Color
Feb 21	Kyoto	Yodo Tankyori Stakes	OP	1200m（Firm）	16	15	3.9（3）	2nd	1:09.3	0.2	Yutaka Take	Tokio Perfect
Apr 25	Kyoto	Silk Road Stakes	3	1200m（Firm）	14	2	6.0（3）	2nd	1:09.0	0.3	Norihiro Yokoyama	Meiner Love
May 23	Chukyo	Takamatsunomiya Kinen	1	1200m（Firm）	16	14	4.8（2）	5th	1:08.4	0.4	Norihiro Yokoyama	Masa Lucky
Jun 13	Tokyo	Yasuda Kinen	1	1600m（Firm）	14	3	36.8（7）	8th	1:34.6	1.3	Koshiro Take	Air Jihad
Jul 17	Kokura	Kitakyushu Tankyori Stakes	OP	1200m（Firm）	12	10	1.4（1）	1st	R1:06.5	–0.7	Yutaka Take	(Daitaku Kamikaze)
Aug 29	Kokura	Kokura Nikkei Open	OP	1200m（Firm）	15	4	1.2（1）	1st	1:07.8	–0.2	Futoshi Komaki	(Meisho Ayame)
Oct 3	Longchamp	Prix de l'Abbaye de Longchamp	1	1000m（Heavy）	14	1	68/10（4）	1st	1:01.4	–0.1	Yutaka Take	(Imperial Beauty)
Nov 27	Kokura	CBC Sho	2	1200m（Firm）	17	10	1.2（1）	1st	1:07.5	–0.1	Yutaka Take	(Masa Lucky)
Dec 19	Nakayama	Sprinters Stakes	1	1200m（Firm）	16	5	2.6（1）	2nd	1:08.2	0.0	Yutaka Take	Black Hawk
2000 – five-year-old season
Mar 26	Chukyo	Takamatsunomiya Kinen	1	1200m (Firm）	17	5	2.7（2）	3rd	1:08.7	0.1	Yutaka Take	King Halo
Jun 20	Ascot	King's Stand Stakes	2	5f (Firm）	23	2	16/1（10）	2nd	1:01.3	0.2	Yutaka Take	Nuclear Debate
Jul 13	Newmarket	July Cup	1	6f (Soft）	10	1	4/1（1）	1st	1:13.1	0.0	Yutaka Take	(Lincoln Dancer)
Oct 1	Nakayama	Sprinters Stakes	1	1200m (Good）	16	9	2.1（1）	2nd	1:08.8	0.2	Yutaka Take	Daitaku Yamato
2001 – six-year-old season
Nov 4	Churchill Downs	Breeders' Cup Sprint	1	3/4 miles (Fast）	14	11	197/10（7）	8th	1:09.0	1.3	Yutaka Take	Kona Gold

Legend:
Turf Dirt

== Stud record ==
Agnes World was retired from racing to become a breeding stallion. He began his stud career in Japan and later stood in Europe at the Dalham Hall Stud as well as being shuttled to Australia for the Southern hemisphere breeding season. The most successful of his offspring has been the Australian-bred Wonderful World, who won the Caulfield Guineas in 2006. His last reported foals were born in 2006. Agnes World died in Japan on 20 August 2012.

== Pedigree ==
Pedigree of Agnes World (USA), bay or brown stallion, 1995
Sire Danzig (USA) 1977	Northern Dancer (CAN); 1961	Nearctic	Nearco
Sire Danzig (USA) 1977	Northern Dancer (CAN); 1961	Nearctic	Lady Angela
Sire Danzig (USA) 1977	Northern Dancer (CAN); 1961	Natalma	Native Dancer
Sire Danzig (USA) 1977	Northern Dancer (CAN); 1961	Natalma	Almahmoud
Sire Danzig (USA) 1977	Pas de Nom (USA); 1968	Admiral's Voyage	Crafty Admiral
Sire Danzig (USA) 1977	Pas de Nom (USA); 1968	Admiral's Voyage	Olympia Lou
Sire Danzig (USA) 1977	Pas de Nom (USA); 1968	Petitioner	Petition
Sire Danzig (USA) 1977	Pas de Nom (USA); 1968	Petitioner	Steady Aim
Dam Mysteries (USA) 1986	Seattle Slew (USA); 1974	Bold Reasoning	Boldnesian
Dam Mysteries (USA) 1986	Seattle Slew (USA); 1974	Bold Reasoning	Reason To Earn
Dam Mysteries (USA) 1986	Seattle Slew (USA); 1974	My Charmer	Poker
Dam Mysteries (USA) 1986	Seattle Slew (USA); 1974	My Charmer	Fair Charmer
Dam Mysteries (USA) 1986	Phydilla (FR); 1978	Lyphard	Northern Dancer
Dam Mysteries (USA) 1986	Phydilla (FR); 1978	Lyphard	Goofed
Dam Mysteries (USA) 1986	Phydilla (FR); 1978	Godzilla	Gyr
Dam Mysteries (USA) 1986	Phydilla (FR); 1978	Godzilla	Gently (Family: 6-b)

- Agnes World was inbred 2 x 4 to Northern Dancer, meaning that this stallion appears in both the second and fourth generations of his pedigree.
