= Saint Ballado =

Canadian Thoroughbred racehorse

- Sire: Halo
- Grandsire: Hail to Reason
- Dam: Ballade
- Damsire: Herbager
- Sex: Stallion
- Foaled: 1989
- Country: Canada
- Colour: Brown
- Breeder: Windfields Farm
- Owner: Taylor Made Farm and Aaron and Marie Jones
- Trainer: Clint C. Goodrich
- Record: 9: 4-2-0
- Earnings: $302,820

Major wins
- Arlington Classic (1992); Sheridan Stakes (1992)

Awards
- Leading sire in North America (2005)

Saint Ballado (1989-2002) was a Canadian-bred Thoroughbred race horse, best known as the sire of Horse of the Year Saint Liam and champion Ashado. Saint Ballado was the leading sire in North America of 2005.

== Background ==
Saint Ballado was bred in Ontario by Windfields Farm. He was sired by Halo, himself a leading sire whose other offspring included the great Sunday Silence. Saint Ballado's dam, Ballade, was the 1992 Canadian Broodmare of the Year. A daughter of Herbager, she had previously produced champions Glorious Song and Devil's Bag.

In 1990, Saint Ballado was purchased at a Keeneland yearling sale for $90,000 by Clint Goodrich as agent for Tartan Farms. The price was thought to be low for the full brother to the champions Glorious Song and Devil's Bag, but bidders were put off by his conformation (he was notably back at the knees and had upright pasterns). In 1991, Saint Ballado was purchased privately from Tartan Farms by trainer Clint Goodrich and his two partners, Robert Lothenbach and Stephan Herold, for $150,000.

== Race career ==
Saint Ballado's race record spanned only nine starts with four wins to his credit, two of them at the stakes level. In August 1991, he started in his first race, finishing second in a maiden race at Arlington Park. However, he was given time off due to his lingering physical immaturity and did not break his maiden until January 1992 in what was his second lifetime start. By his fourth race, he had his second win. He was then moved into stakes races and was unplaced in two Grade II events, the Jim Beam and Blue Grass Stakes. Goodrich moved him back to Arlington Park and entered him in the Grade III Sheridan Stakes, which he won by seven lengths. Saint Ballado was then entered in the Arlington Classic, then a Grade II stakes. He won the race by 4 and a half lengths pulling away. In his next start though, he finished fourth in the Grade I Haskell Invitational at Monmouth Park. Saint Ballado retired after the Haskell, his career possibly cut short by his conformation faults.

== Breeding career ==
In 1993, Saint Ballado began his breeding career in Florida at Ocala Stud Farms. Because of his indifferent race record and the lack of success of Devil's Bag at stud, his initial stud fee was only $2,500. At the time of his death in 2002, his stud fee had jumped to $125,000, over 50 times his original fee. By that time, he had been purchased from the original racing partnership of Goodrich, Lothenbach and Herold by breeder Aaron U. Jones for a reported (USD) $6.5M and relocated to Taylor Made Farm in Kentucky. In 2005, Saint Ballado was awarded Leading Sire of the Year with his progeny earning over $9.2 million that year alone. His offspring also did very well in yearlings sales. For example, Word of Mouth sold for $2.6 million, and Warhol sold for $4 million.

Saint Ballado sired 68 stakes winners from 717 named foals. His most notable offspring include:

- Saint Liam: Champion Older Male 2005 and Horse of the Year 2005
- Ashado: Champion 3-Y-O Filly 2004; Champion Older Female 2005
- Captain Bodgit: Grade 1 Winner (Florida Derby)
- Yankee Victor: Grade 1 Winner (Metropolitan Handicap)
- Sunriver: Grade 1 Winner (Hollywood Turf Cup Stakes)
- Sister Act: Grade 1 Winner (Hempstead Handicap)

== Death ==
Saint Ballado was euthanized in October 2002 after "surgery to correct clinical signs associated with a compressive cervical myelopathy." He died as a relatively young stallion at the age of 13 and was buried at Taylor Made Farm, where he spent his last years standing at stud.

== Pedigree ==
Pedigree of Saint Ballado, dark bay horse, May 14, 1989
Sire Halo	Hail to Reason	Turn-to	Royal Charger
Sire Halo	Hail to Reason	Turn-to	Source Sucree
Sire Halo	Hail to Reason	Nothirdchance	Blue Swords
Sire Halo	Hail to Reason	Nothirdchance	Galla Colors
Sire Halo	Cosmah	Cosmic Bomb	Pharamond
Sire Halo	Cosmah	Cosmic Bomb	Banish Fear
Sire Halo	Cosmah	Almahmoud	Mahmoud*
Sire Halo	Cosmah	Almahmoud	Arbitrator
Dam Ballade	Herbager	Vandale (FR)	Plassy (GB)
Dam Ballade	Herbager	Vandale (FR)	Vanille (FR)
Dam Ballade	Herbager	Flagette (FR)	Escamillo (FR)
Dam Ballade	Herbager	Flagette (FR)	Fidgette (FR)
Dam Ballade	Miss Swapsco	Cohoes	Mahmoud*
Dam Ballade	Miss Swapsco	Cohoes	Belle of Troy
Dam Ballade	Miss Swapsco	Soaring	Swaps
Dam Ballade	Miss Swapsco	Soaring	Skylarking (family 12-c)

- Saint Ballado is inbred 4s × 4d to the stallion Mahmoud, meaning that he appears once in the fourth generation on the sire side and once in the fourth generation on the dam of his pedigree.
