= Lord Derby Challenge Trophy =

Lord Derby Challenge Trophy ダービー卿チャレンジトロフィー
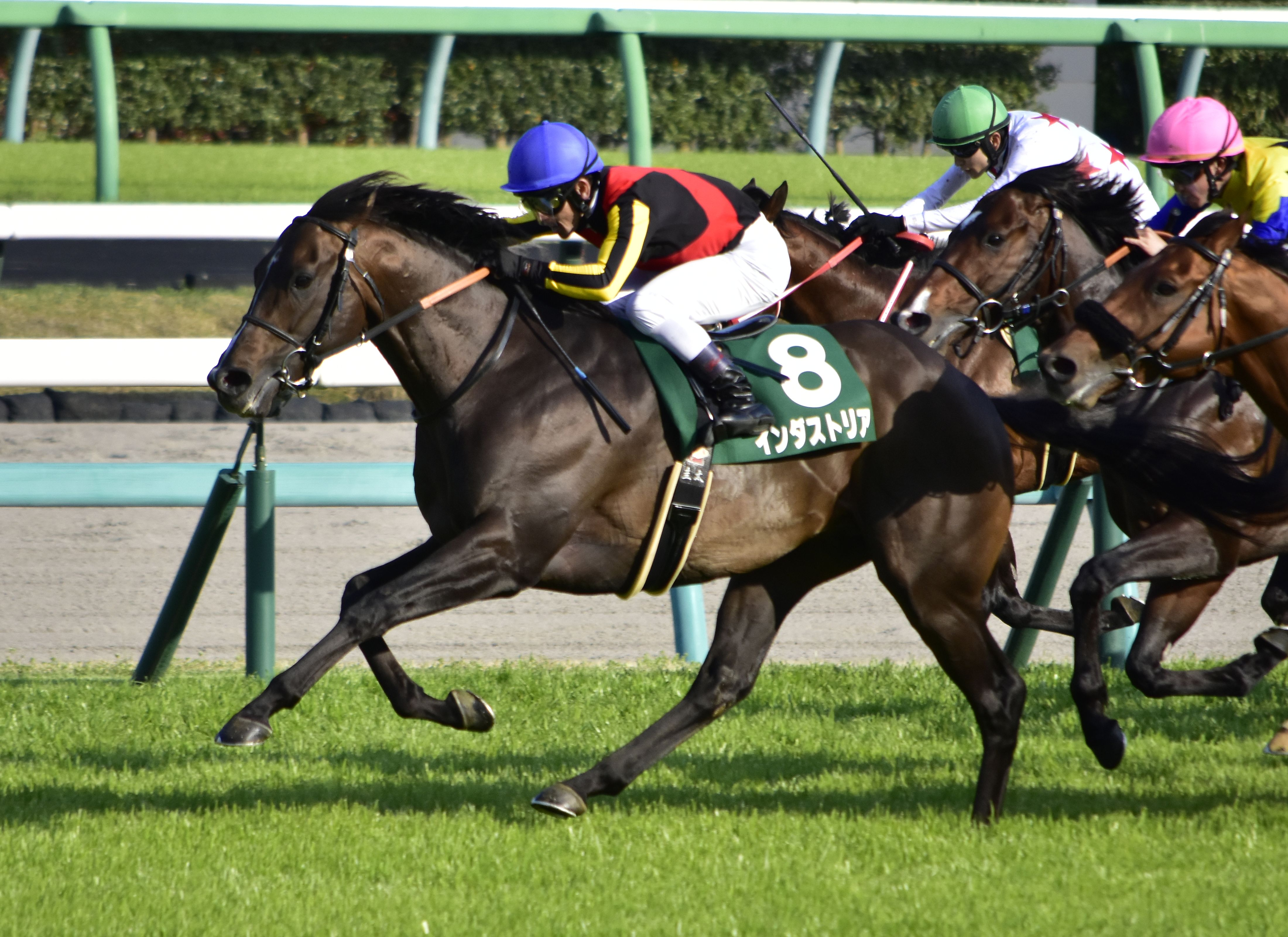
- Industria, winner of the 2023 Lord Derby Challenge Trophy
- Class: Grade 3
- Location: Nakayama Racecourse
- Inaugurated: 1969
- Race type: Thoroughbred Flat racing

Race information
- Distance: 1600 metres
- Surface: Turf
- Track: Right-handed
- Qualification: 4-y-o+
- Weight: Handicap
- Purse: ¥ 87,960,000 (as of 2025): 1st: ¥ 41,000,000; 2nd: ¥ 16,000,000; 3rd: ¥ 10,000,000

The Lord Derby Challenge Trophy (Japanese ダービー卿チャレンジトロフィー) is a Japanese Grade 3 horse race for Thoroughbreds aged four and over. Organized by Japan Racing Association, it is run in March over a distance of 1600 metres on turf at Nakayama Racecourse.

It was first run in 1969 and has held Grade 3 status since 1984. The race was run at Tokyo Racecourse until 1980 and was run over 1800 metres until 1979.

== Winners since 2000 ==
Year	Winner	Age	Jockey	Trainer	Owner	Time
2000	Fusaichi Airedale	4	Yutaka Take	Kunihide Matsuda	Fusao Sekiguchi	1:33.0
2001	Check Mate	6	Shinji Fujita	Kenji Yamauchi	Tomiro Fukami	1:35.2
2002	Grass World	6	Shinji Fujita	Katsumi Suzuki	Hanzawa	1:32.4
2003	Dantsu Judge	4	Ryuji Wada	Kenji Yamauchi	Tetsuji Yamamoto	1:33.9
2004	Meiner Morgen	4	Hiroki Goto	Masahiro Horii	Thoroughbred Club Ruffian	1:33.4
2005	Daiwa Major	4	Yoshitomi Shibata	Hiroyuki Uehara	Keizo Oshiro	1:32.3
2006	Great Journey	5	Tetsuzo Sato	Yasuo Ikee	North Hills Management	1:32.4
2007	Picaresque Coat	5	Shinichiro Akiyama	Yasutoshi Ikee	Kaneko Makoto Holdings	1:33.1
2008	Silent Pride	5	Norihiro Yokoyama	Sakae Kunieda	Shadai Race Horse	1:34.2
2009	Take Mikazuchi	4	Yoshitomi Shibata	Satoshi Oehara	Shadai Race Horse	1:33.7
2010	Showa Modern	6	Hiroki Goto	Hiroaki Sugiura	Keiichi Yamagishi	1:34.3
2011	Blitzen	5	Yoshitomi Shibata	Yoshitaka Ninomiya	Hiroo Race	1:33.3
2012	Garbo	5	Shu Ishibashi	Hidekatsu Shimizu	Kazuyoshi Ishikawa	1:33.5
2013	Tokei Halo	4	Masami Matsuoka	Hisashi Shimizu	Nobuhiko Kimura	1:32.6
2014	Curren Black Hill	5	Shinichiro Akiyama	Osamu Hirata	Takashi Suzuki	1:34.6
2015	Maurice	4	Keita Tosaki	Noriyuki Hori	Kazumi Yoshida	1:32.2
2016	Magic Time	5	Andrasch Starke	Tadanari Nakagawa	Sunday Racing	1:32.8
2017	Logi Chalice	5	Hiroyuki Uchida	Sakae Kunieda	Masaaki Kumeta	1:34.7
2018	He's In Love	5	Kota Fujioka	Kenichi Fujioka	Silk Racing	1:32.2
2019	Fiano Romano	5	Yuga Kawada	Tomokazu Takano	Kazumi Yoshida	1:31.7
2020	Kluger	8	Shu Ishibashi	Tomokazu Takano	Carrot Farm	1:32.8
2021	Terzetto	4	Mirco Demuro	Shoichiro Wada	Silk Racing	1:32.6
2022	Time To Heaven	4	Takuya Ono	Hirofumi Toda	DMM Dream Club	1:32.3
2023	Industria	4	Keita Tosaki	Keisuke Miyata	Sunday Racing	1:33.2
2024	Parallel Vision	5	Keita Tosaki	Sakae Kunieda	Carrot Farm	1:32.9
2025	Trovatore	4	João Moreira	Yuichi Shikato	Sunday Racing	1:32.4
2026	Suzu Khalom	6	Takashi Fujikake	Kazuya Makita	Tatsuro Mori	1:33.4

== Earlier winners ==
- 1969 - Suzuno Tsubasa
- 1970 - Kurishiba
- 1971 - Josetsu
- 1972 - Toku Zakura
- 1973 - Yushio
- 1974 - Zao Ryujin
- 1975 - Yamabuki O
- 1976 - Merci Shadai
- 1977 - Great Seikan
- 1978 - Model Sport
- 1979 - Mark Hiryu
- 1980 - Nichido Arashi
- 1981 - Takeno Happy
- 1982 - Tosho God
- 1983 - Tudenham King
- 1984 - Tosho Pegasus
- 1985 - Suzu Parade
- 1986 - Suzu Parade
- 1987 - Windstoss
- 1988 - Windstoss
- 1989 - Ivy Toko
- 1990 - Yamano Tampopo
- 1991 - Nice Power
- 1992 - Tomoe Regent
- 1993 - Tomoe Regent
- 1994 - Sakura Bakushin O
- 1995 - Ogi Tiffany
- 1996 - Fujino Makken O
- 1997 - Royal Suzuka
- 1998 - Black Hawk
- 1999 - Keiwan Viking

== See also ==
- Horse racing in Japan
- List of Japanese flat horse races
