= Air Jihad =

Japanese Thoroughbred racehorse

Air Jihad エアジハード
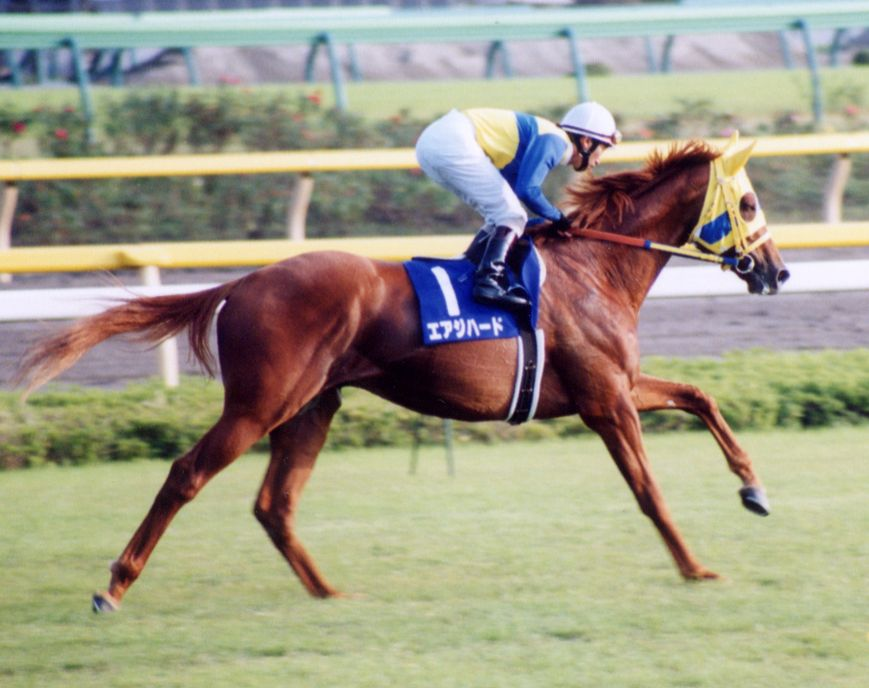
- Air Jihad in Tokyo Racecourse on October 1999
- Breed: Thoroughbred
- Sire: Sakura Yutaka O
- Grandsire: Tesco Boy
- Dam: Icy Goggle
- Damsire: Royal Ski
- Sex: Stallion
- Foaled: April 9, 1995 (age 31)
- Country: Japan
- Color: Chesnut
- Breeder: Shadai Farm
- Owner: Lucky Field Co. Ltd.
- Racing colors
- Trainer: Masanori Ito
- Jockey: Masayoshi Ebina; Hiroki Hashimoto
- Record: 12: 7-2-1
- Earnings: ¥360,004,000

Major wins
- Fuji Stakes (1998); Yasuda Kinen (1999); Mile Championship (1999)

Awards
- JRA Award for Best Sprinter or Miler (1999); JRA Best Horse By Home-Bred Sire (1999)

Air Jihad (Japanese: エアジハード, Hepburn: Ea Jihādo, born 9 April 1995) is a retired Japanese Thoroughbred racehorse and sire. During his racing career, he won two G1 races, the Yasuda Kinen and the Mile Championship in the same year. Because of this, he was awarded the JRA Award for Best Sprinter or Miler in 1999, along with the JRA Best Horse By Home-Bred Sire. His total earnings were 360,004,000 JPY after he retired.

== Background ==
Air Jihad is a chestnut horse foaled by Icy Goggle. He was born on April 9, 1995, at the Shadai Farm, sired by Sakura Yutaka O. His grandsire, Tesco Boy, was a British-bred racehorse and the leading sire in Japan six times.

== Stud Career ==
Air Jihad had sired a total of 380 registered foals, one of which—Showa Modern—is a 2010 Yasuda Kinen winner.

=== Notable progeny ===
Below data is based on JBIS Stallion Reports.

bold = grade 1 stakes

c = colt, f = filly

**Foaled**	**Name**	**Sex**	**Major Wins**
2001	Agnes Raspberry	f	Hakodate Sprint Stakes
2001	Nanayo Himawari	c	March Stakes
2004	Showa Modern	c	Lord Derby Challenge Trophy, **Yasuda Kinen**

== Racing Record ==
In Air Jihad's racing career from 1997 to 1999, he competed in a total of 12 races where he won seven. The table below shows his racing statistics.

Date	Race	Grade	Distance	Surface	Condition	Track	Entry	Finish	Time	Margin	Jockey	Winner (Runner-up)
**1997 – three-year-old season**
Dec 7	3YO Debut		1200m	Turf	Firm	Nakayama	10	1st	1:10.8	-0.6	Yutaka Take	(Ferdeen)
**1998 – four-year-old season**
Feb 1	Cattleya Sho	ALW (1 Win)	1200m	Dirt	Fast	Tokyo	15	1st	1:13.6	-0.2	Yutaka Take	(I Am a Brother)
Mar 22	Fuji TV Sho Spring Stakes	G2	1800m	Turf	Good	Nakayama	15	4th	1:50.1	0.3	Yutaka Take	Courir Cyclone
May 17	NHK Mile Cup	G1	1600m	Turf	Good	Tokyo	17	8th	1:34.5	0.8	Hiroki Hashimoto	El Condor Pasa
Oct 18	3YO & UP		1600m	Turf	Soft	Tokyo	9	1st	1:36.4	-0.2	Hiroki Hashimoto	(Conquista Crown)
Nov 14	Okutama Stakes	ALW (3 Win)	1400m	Turf	Firm	Tokyo	14	1st	1:22.2	-0.1	Hiroki Hashimoto	(Wakasa Baron)
Nov 28	Fuji Stakes	G3	1400m	Turf	Firm	Tokyo	15	1st	1:23.0	0.0	Hiroki Hashimoto	(Prest Symboli)
**1999 – five-year-old season**
Apr 25	Tanigawadake Stakes	OP	1600m	Turf	Firm	Niigata	15	2nd	1:32.5	0.0	Hiroki Hashimoto	Narita Protector
May 15	Keio Hai Spring Cup	G2	1400m	Turf	Firm	Tokyo	18	2nd	1:20.6	0.1	Masayoshi Ebina	Grass Wonder
Jun 13	Yasuda Kinen	G1	1600m	Turf	Firm	Tokyo	14	1st	1:33.3	0.0	Masayoshi Ebina	(Grass Wonder)
Oct 31	Tennō Shō (Autumn)	G1	2000m	Turf	Firm	Tokyo	17	3rd	1:58.2	0.2	Masayoshi Ebina	Special Week
Nov 21	Mile Championship	G1	1600m	Turf	Firm	Tokyo	18	1st	1:32.8	-0.2	Masayoshi Ebina	(King Halo)

== Pedigree ==
Pedigree of Air Jihad, chestnut horse, 1995
Sire Sakura Yutaka O ch. 1982	Tesco Boy dk.b. 1963	Princely Gift	Nasrullah
Sire Sakura Yutaka O ch. 1982	Tesco Boy dk.b. 1963	Princely Gift	Blue Gem
Sire Sakura Yutaka O ch. 1982	Tesco Boy dk.b. 1963	Suncourt	Hyperion
Sire Sakura Yutaka O ch. 1982	Tesco Boy dk.b. 1963	Suncourt	Inquisition
Sire Sakura Yutaka O ch. 1982	Angelica dk.b. 1970	Never Beat	Never Say Die
Sire Sakura Yutaka O ch. 1982	Angelica dk.b. 1970	Never Beat	Bride Elect
Sire Sakura Yutaka O ch. 1982	Angelica dk.b. 1970	Star Highness	Your Highness
Sire Sakura Yutaka O ch. 1982	Angelica dk.b. 1970	Star Highness	Star Roch
Dam Icy Goggle ch. 1987	Royal Ski ch. 1974	Raja Baba	Bold Ruler
Dam Icy Goggle ch. 1987	Royal Ski ch. 1974	Raja Baba	Missy Baba
Dam Icy Goggle ch. 1987	Royal Ski ch. 1974	Coz o'Nijinsky	Involvement
Dam Icy Goggle ch. 1987	Royal Ski ch. 1974	Coz o'Nijinsky	Gleam
Dam Icy Goggle ch. 1987	Shadai Ivor b. 1979	Northern Taste	Northern Dancer
Dam Icy Goggle ch. 1987	Shadai Ivor b. 1979	Northern Taste	Lady Victoria
Dam Icy Goggle ch. 1987	Shadai Ivor b. 1979	Sour Orange	Delta Judge
Dam Icy Goggle ch. 1987	Shadai Ivor b. 1979	Sour Orange	Lady Attica
