= Halo (horse) =

American Thoroughbred racehorse

- Halo, muzzled, standing in a field
- Breed: Thoroughbred
- Sire: Hail To Reason
- Grandsire: Turn-To
- Dam: Cosmah
- Damsire: Cosmic Bomb
- Sex: Stallion
- Foaled: February 7, 1969
- Died: November 28, 2000 (aged 31)
- Country: United States
- Colour: Black Bay
- Breeder: John R. Gaines
- Owner: Cragwood Stable
- Trainer: MacKenzie Miller
- Record: 31: 9–8–5
- Earnings: $259,553

Major wins
- Lawrence Realization Stakes (1972); Tidal Handicap (1974); United Nations Handicap (1974)

Awards
- Leading sire in North America (1983, 1989)

Halo (February 7, 1969 – November 28, 2000) was an American Thoroughbred racehorse and an important Champion sire.

== Background ==
Bred in Kentucky by John R. Gaines, founder of the Breeders Cup, Halo was out of the mare Cosmah (who was the Kentucky Broodmare of the Year in 1974), which made him a half-brother to the Hall of Fame filly Tosmah. His sire was Hail To Reason, the U.S. Champion 2-Year-Old Colt and a great-grandson of the extremely important sire Nearco.

Purchased by Charles W. Engelhard, Jr., owner of Nijinsky, Halo raced under his Cragwood Stable banner.

== Racing career ==
After having little success at age two racing on dirt tracks, in his three-year-old campaign his U.S. Racing Hall of Fame trainer MacKenzie Miller switched him to racing on turf, where he achieved better results. Although never a superstar horse, Halo raced for four years and in 1974, at age five, won the Grade I United Nations Handicap.

== Stud record ==
After retiring from racing, in 1975 Halo was sent to stand at stud at the Maryland division of Windfields Farm, where his progeny included Sunny's Halo and, through his mating with the mare Ballade, Devil's Bag, Glorious Song, and Saint Ballado. In 1984, new majority owners moved Halo to stand at Arthur B. Hancock III's Stone Farm in Paris, Kentucky, where he continued to produce notable offspring, the star of which was Sunday Silence. In all, Halo sired seven champions and 62 stakes winners including two Kentucky Derby winners. Twice, he was the leading sire in North America.

During his stallion career, Halo became infamous for his sullen demeanor (often attributed to him being handled by an abusive caretaker with a rake during his racing career), and was known for his penchant to bite his handlers when they were distracted. On one occasion, Halo threw his stud groom Randy Mitchell to the ground and started aggressively biting Mitchell's stomach repeatedly, requiring multiple stitches. He was also allegedly known to drown birds in his waterbucket. As such, Halo was usually kept muzzled.

Halo was pensioned in 1997 and he died at Stone Farm from a heart attack on November 28, 2000, at age 31.

== Offspring ==
Halo was the sire of:

- Devil's Bag – won Champagne Stakes, Laurel Futurity, voted 1983 U.S. Champion 2-Year-Old Colt
- Glorious Song – 1980 & 1981 Canadian Champion Older Female Horse, 1980 United States Champion Older Female Horse, 1980 Canadian Horse of the Year
- Goodbye Halo – filly won seven Grade I stakes, earned in excess of $1.7 million
- Jolie's Halo – won three Grade I stakes, equaled track record in winning the Philip H. Iselin Handicap, earned in excess of $1.2 million
- Lively One – won Grade I Swaps Stakes, earned in excess of $1.5 million
- Present Value – multiple stakes winner, earned in excess of $1.1 million
- Saint Ballado – won 1992 Arlington Classic Stakes, sire of Saint Liam and Ashado
- Southern Halo – Leading Sire in Argentina for eleven years, sire of 170 stakes winners.
- Sunday Silence – won 1989 Kentucky Derby, Preakness Stakes, Breeders' Cup Classic. The U.S. Racing Hall of Fame inductee is the most successful sire in the world by progeny earnings which was estimated on $800 million.
- Sunny's Halo – won 1983 Kentucky Derby

Grandsire of:

- Agnes Tachyon – Leading sire in Japan (2008); sire of Daiwa Scarlet and Deep Sky
- Answer Lively – 1998 U.S. Champion 2-Year-Old Colt
- Ashado – Kentucky Oaks, Breeders' Cup Distaff winner, 2004 U.S. Champion 3-Yr-Old filly, 2005 U.S. Champion Older Female Horse
- Deep Impact – won 2005 Japanese Triple Crown, Japan Horse of the Year (2005, 2006), Leading sire of Japan (2012–22); sire of Gentildonna and Contrail
- Devil His Due – multiple Grade I stakes winner, earned in excess of $3.9 million
- Heart's Cry – won the Dubai Sheema Classic and Arima Kinen; sire of Just A Way
- Manhattan Cafe – Leading sire in Japan (2009)
- Saint Liam – won Breeders' Cup Classic, 2005 U.S. Horse of the Year
- Special Week – multiple Grade I winner; sire of Buena Vista
- Stay Gold – won the Dubai Sheema Classic and Hong Kong Vase; sire of Orfevre, Gold Ship, and Oju Chosan
- Taiki Shuttle – 1998 Japan Horse of the Year
- Team – Multiple Grade I winner, 1998 Argentinian Horse of the Year
- Zenno Rob Roy – Multiple Grade I winner, 2004 Japan Horse of the Year

Damsire of:

- Coup de Genie – multiple Group I winner, 1993 Champion 2-Year-Old Filly in France
- King Halo – foaled by Goodbye Halo; won the Takamatsunomiya Kinen in 2000
- Machiavellian – 1989 Champion 2-Year-Old Colt in France
- Pine Bluff – winner of the 1992 Arkansas Derby and Preakness Stakes
- Rahy – sired Champions Fantastic Light, Serena's Song and was the Leading broodmare sire in Great Britain & Ireland
- Singspiel – won Canadian International Stakes and Japan Cup (1996), Dubai World Cup (1997). Voted 1996 U.S. Champion Male Turf Horse

== Pedigree ==
Pedigree of Halo, black stallion, foaled February 7, 1969
Sire Hail To Reason brown 1958	Turn-To b. 1951	Royal Charger ch. 1942	Nearco
Sire Hail To Reason brown 1958	Turn-To b. 1951	Royal Charger ch. 1942	Sun Princess
Sire Hail To Reason brown 1958	Turn-To b. 1951	Source Sucree br. 1940	Admiral Drake
Sire Hail To Reason brown 1958	Turn-To b. 1951	Source Sucree br. 1940	Lavendula
Sire Hail To Reason brown 1958	Nothirdchance b. 1948	Blue Swords b. 1940	Blue Larkspur
Sire Hail To Reason brown 1958	Nothirdchance b. 1948	Blue Swords b. 1940	Flaming Swords
Sire Hail To Reason brown 1958	Nothirdchance b. 1948	Galla Colors b. 1943	Sir Gallahad
Sire Hail To Reason brown 1958	Nothirdchance b. 1948	Galla Colors b. 1943	Rouge Et Noir
Dam Cosmah bay 1953	Cosmic Bomb dkb/br. 1944	Pharamond br. 1925	Phalaris
Dam Cosmah bay 1953	Cosmic Bomb dkb/br. 1944	Pharamond br. 1925	Selene
Dam Cosmah bay 1953	Cosmic Bomb dkb/br. 1944	Banish Fear br. 1932	Blue Larkspur
Dam Cosmah bay 1953	Cosmic Bomb dkb/br. 1944	Banish Fear br. 1932	Herodiade
Dam Cosmah bay 1953	Almahmoud ch. 1947	Mahmoud gr. 1933	Blenheim
Dam Cosmah bay 1953	Almahmoud ch. 1947	Mahmoud gr. 1933	Mah Mahal
Dam Cosmah bay 1953	Almahmoud ch. 1947	Arbitrator b. 1937	Peace Chance
Dam Cosmah bay 1953	Almahmoud ch. 1947	Arbitrator b. 1937	Mother Goose (Family 2-d)

Halo is inbred 4x4 to Blue Larkspur, meaning Blue Larkspur appears twice in the fourth generation of his pedigree.
