= Yoshitomi Shibata =

Japanese Horse racing jockey (born 1966)

Yoshitomi Shibata 柴田善臣
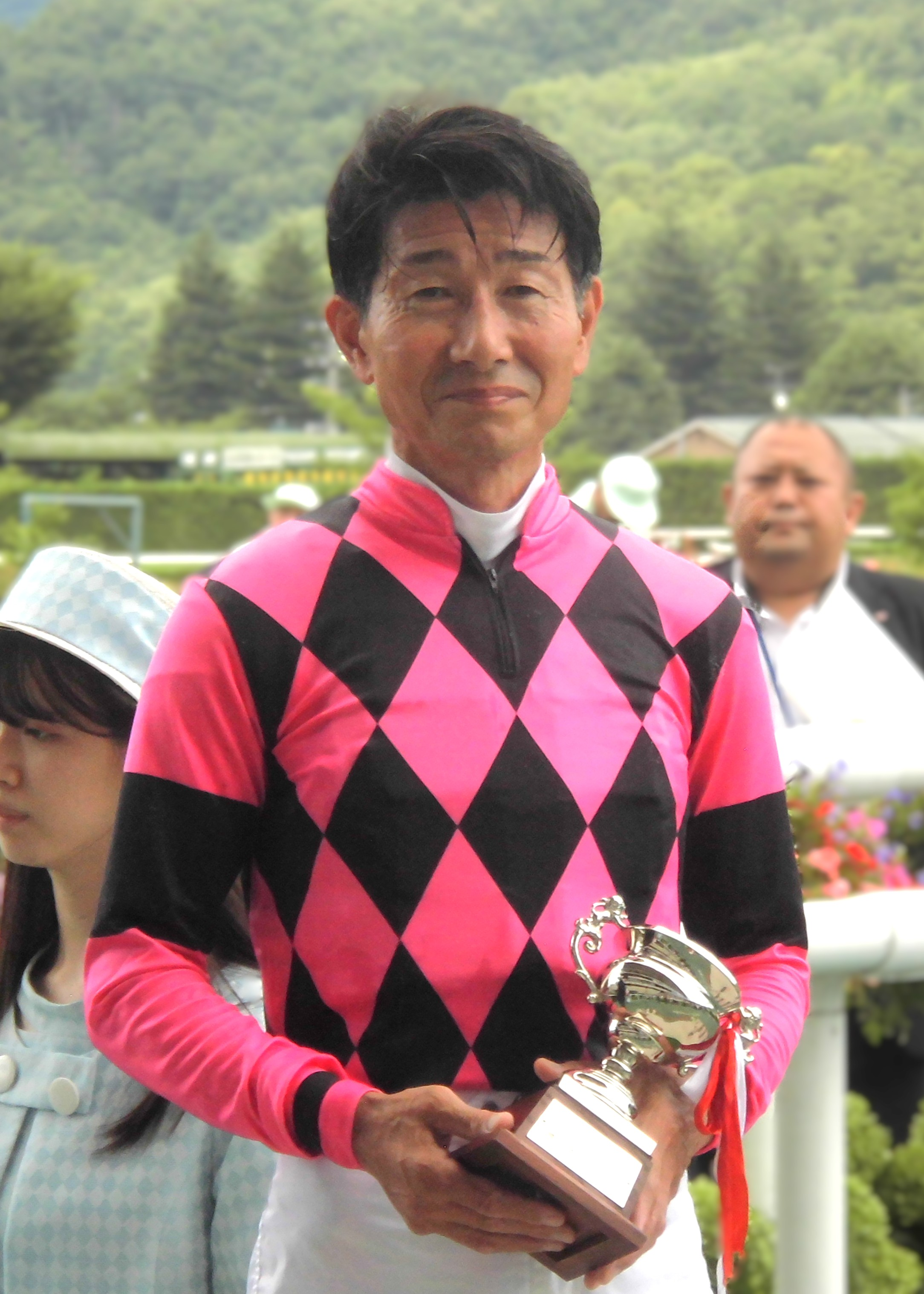

Personal information
- Nationality: Japanese
- Born: July 30, 1966 (age 60) Tōhoku, Aomori
- Occupation: Jockey
- Height: 164 cm (5 ft 5 in)
- Weight: 53 kg (117 lb)

Horse racing career
- Sport: Horse racing
- Career wins: 2,341 (JRA) + 118 (NAR), as of Apr 16, 2026

Yoshitomi Shibata (柴田 善臣, Shibata Yoshitomi) (born July 30, 1966, in Tōhoku, Aomori) is a retired Japanese Horse racing jockey. He is a three-time champion jockey of Kantō, riding to 2,000 victories in his career.

He comes from a racing family; most notably his uncle Masato Shibata, who was a prolific jockey who won over 4,000 races during his career. He rode his first winner in 1985, on Izumi-Sanei at Nakayama. He was Japanese champion apprentice in 1985. He won his first grade race in 1988, riding Soushin-Houju in the Nakayama Himba Stakes.

He earned his 2000th career victory at Nakayama while riding Nakayama Knight, on 17 December 2011.

On November 5, 2022, Shibata became the oldest JRA jockey to win a race after he won a race at the Fukushima Race Course while riding Billecart, a record he would break 2 weeks later at the Fukushima Min'yu Cup with Verdad Imeru. That same year Shibata was awarded the Medal with Yellow Ribbon, becoming the first active JRA jockey to win a Medal.

On September 15, 2026, it was announced that Shibata would retire from jockey duty after suffering a torn rotator cuff injury in April. He raced in 22,311 starts, won 2,341 of them in the central races, including nine G1s, and placed him as the sixth-most winning JRA jockey ever. He was also officially the first 60-year-old jockey, despite never riding a horse at said age. A retirement ceremony is scheduled for Shibata at Tokyo Racecourse on November 1, which would also be the same day that the Autumn Tenno Sho is held there.

== Major wins ==
- Tenno Sho (Autumn) - (2) - Yamanin Zephyr (1993), Offside Trap (1998)
- Takarazuka Kinen - (1) - Nakayama Festa (2010)
- Queen Elizabeth II Commemorative Cup - (1) - Rainbow Dahlia (2012)
- Yasuda Kinen - (2) - Yamanin Zephyr (1993), Just A Way(2014)
- Takamatsunomiya Kinen - (2) - King Halo (2000), Oreha Matteruze (2006)
- NHK Mile Cup - (1) - Taiki Fortune (1996)
- Japan Dirt Derby - (1) - Cafe Olympus (2004)
- Japan Breeding farm's Cup Sprint - (1) - South Vigorous (2003)
