= Cosmah =

American thoroughbred racehorse

- Breed: Thoroughbred
- Sire: Cosmic Bomb
- Grandsire: Pharamond
- Dam: Almahoud
- Damsire: Mahmoud
- Sex: Filly
- Foaled: 1953
- Country: USA
- Color: Bay
- Breeder: Henry H. Knight
- Owner: Eugene Mori
- Trainer: Frank J. Zitto
- Record: 30:9-5-2
- Earnings: $85,525

Major wins
- Astarita Stakes (1955); Gardenia Trial Stakes (1955)

Cosmah (April 4, 1953 – 1979) was an American Thoroughbred racehorse. While not known for her racing career, she is well known for being the dam of Tosmah and Halo, both of whom were top level race winners.

== Racing career ==
Cosmah won the 1955 Astarita Stakes, her lone black-type win, due to the disqualification of another horse named Dark Vintage.

== Broodmare ==
Cosmah's descendants include:

- Tosmah (1961), filly: Frizette Stakes, Astarita Stakes, Mermaid Stakes, Arlington Classic, Beldame Stakes
- Maribeau (1962), colt: Fountain of Youth Stakes
- Halo (1969) colt: Lawrence Realization Stakes, Tidal Handicap, United Nations Handicap
- Queen Sucree (1966), filly: Dam of 16 foals out of which were 10 winners. Many of her offspring were successful broodmares and sires. One of Queen Sucrees daughters was Princess Sucree, dam of Group 2 winner Rasheek and third dam of Group 2 winner Hyper.

Cosmah's other descendants include:

Through Tosmah: 1973 New Jersey Futurity winner La Guidecca.

Through Halo: Sunny's Halo, Sunday Silence, Devil's Bag, Glorious Song, Southern Halo, Saint Ballado and Goodbye Halo

Through Queen Sucree: 1974 Kentucky Derby winner, Cannonade.

== Pedigree ==
Pedigree of Cosmah (USA), 1953
Sire Cosmic Bomb (USA) 1944	Pharamond (GB); 1925	Phalaris	Polymelus
Sire Cosmic Bomb (USA) 1944	Pharamond (GB); 1925	Phalaris	Bromus
Sire Cosmic Bomb (USA) 1944	Pharamond (GB); 1925	Selene	Chaucer
Sire Cosmic Bomb (USA) 1944	Pharamond (GB); 1925	Selene	Serenissima
Sire Cosmic Bomb (USA) 1944	Banish Fear (USA); 1932	Blue Larkspur	Black Servant
Sire Cosmic Bomb (USA) 1944	Banish Fear (USA); 1932	Blue Larkspur	Blossom Time
Sire Cosmic Bomb (USA) 1944	Banish Fear (USA); 1932	Herodiade	Over There
Sire Cosmic Bomb (USA) 1944	Banish Fear (USA); 1932	Herodiade	Herodias
Dam Almahmoud (USA) 1947	Mahmoud (FR); 1933	Blenheim	Blandford
Dam Almahmoud (USA) 1947	Mahmoud (FR); 1933	Blenheim	Malva
Dam Almahmoud (USA) 1947	Mahmoud (FR); 1933	Mah Mahal	Gainsborough
Dam Almahmoud (USA) 1947	Mahmoud (FR); 1933	Mah Mahal	Mumtaz Mahal
Dam Almahmoud (USA) 1947	Arbitrator (USA); 1937	Peace Chance	Chance Shot
Dam Almahmoud (USA) 1947	Arbitrator (USA); 1937	Peace Chance	Peace
Dam Almahmoud (USA) 1947	Arbitrator (USA); 1937	Mother Goose	Chicle
Dam Almahmoud (USA) 1947	Arbitrator (USA); 1937	Mother Goose	Flying Witch (family: 2-d)
