= Cosmic Bomb (horse) =

American-bred Thoroughbred racehorse

- Sire: Pharamond
- Grandsire: Phalaris
- Dam: Banish Fear
- Damsire: Blue Larkspur
- Sex: Stallion
- Foaled: 1944
- Country: United States
- Colour: Dark Bay/Brown
- Owner: William G. Helis, Sr.
- Trainer: Willie Booth
- Record: 27: 11-5-3
- Earnings: US$248,890

Major wins
- Cowdin Stakes (1946); Arlington Futurity (1946); Discovery Handicap (1947); Lawrence Realization Stakes (1947); Trenton Handicap (1947); Roamer Handicap (1947)
- Last updated on May 6, 2010

Cosmic Bomb (foaled 1944) was an American Thoroughbred racehorse whose wins included races that today would be graded events. He is also remembered as the sire of broodmare Cosmah, the 1974 Kentucky Broodmare of the Year who produced Halo, who in turn sired 1983 Kentucky Derby winner Sunny's Halo and U.S. Racing Hall of Fame inductee Sunday Silence. Cosmah also produced Queen Sucree, the dam of Kentucky Derby winner Cannonade.

Cosmic Bomb sired a number of stakes race winners including Federal Hill, winner of the 1956 Kentucky Jockey Club Stakes, the 1957 Louisiana Derby and the 1957 Derby Trial Stakes. Federal Hill set a world record 1:15.00 for six and a half furlongs on dirt at Gulfstream Park.

== Pedigree ==
Pedigree of Cosmic Bomb, Bay stallion (USA), 1944
Sire Pharamond (GB) (1925)	Phalaris (GB) (1913)	Polymelus (GB) (1902)	Cyllene (GB) (1895)
Sire Pharamond (GB) (1925)	Phalaris (GB) (1913)	Polymelus (GB) (1902)	Maid Marian (GB) (1886)
Sire Pharamond (GB) (1925)	Phalaris (GB) (1913)	Bromus (GB) (1905)	Sainfoin (GB) (1887)
Sire Pharamond (GB) (1925)	Phalaris (GB) (1913)	Bromus (GB) (1905)	Cheery (GB) (1892)
Sire Pharamond (GB) (1925)	Selene (GB) (1919)	Chaucer (GB) (1900)	St. Simon (GB) (1881)
Sire Pharamond (GB) (1925)	Selene (GB) (1919)	Chaucer (GB) (1900)	Canterbury Pilgrim (GB) (1893)
Sire Pharamond (GB) (1925)	Selene (GB) (1919)	Serenissima (GB) (1913)	Minoru (GB) (1906)
Sire Pharamond (GB) (1925)	Selene (GB) (1919)	Serenissima (GB) (1913)	Gondolette (GB) (1902)
Dam Banish Fear (1932)	Blue Larkspur (1926)	Black Servant (1918)	Black Toney (IRE) (1911)
Dam Banish Fear (1932)	Blue Larkspur (1926)	Black Servant (1918)	Padula (1906)
Dam Banish Fear (1932)	Blue Larkspur (1926)	Blossom Time (1920)	North Star (GB) (1914)
Dam Banish Fear (1932)	Blue Larkspur (1926)	Blossom Time (1920)	Vaila (IRE) (1911)
Dam Banish Fear (1932)	Herodiade (1923)	Over There (IRE) (1916)	Spearmint (GB) (1903)
Dam Banish Fear (1932)	Herodiade (1923)	Over There (IRE) (1916)	Summer Girl (GB) (1906)
Dam Banish Fear (1932)	Herodiade (1923)	Herodias (GB) (1916)	The Tetrarch (IRE) (1911)
Dam Banish Fear (1932)	Herodiade (1923)	Herodias (GB) (1916)	Honora (GB) (1907)
