= Soul Rush (horse) =

Japanese racehorse

Soul Rush ソウルラッシュ
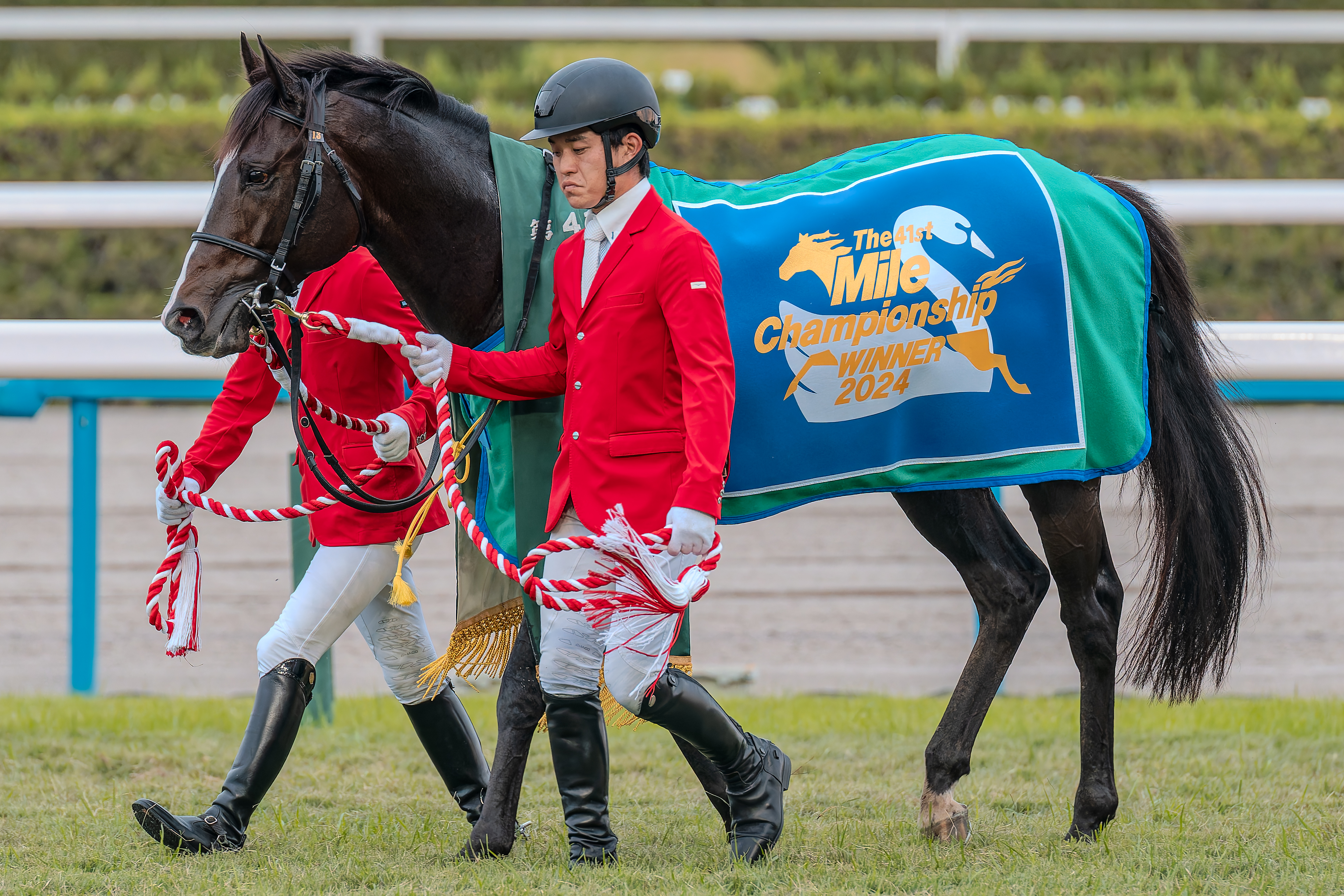
- Soul Rush after winning the 2024 Mile Championship.
- Breed: Thoroughbred
- Sire: Rulership (JPN)
- Grandsire: King Kamehameha (JPN)
- Dam: Eternal Bouquet (JPN)
- Damsire: Manhattan Cafe (JPN)
- Sex: Stallion
- Foaled: March 28, 2018 (age 8)
- Country: Japan
- Color: Bay
- Breeder: Shimokobe Farm
- Owner: Tatsue Ishikawa
- Racing colours
- Trainer: Yasutoshi Ikee
- Jockey: Taisei Danno; Cristian Demuro; Suguru Hamanaka; Kohei Matsuyama
- Record: 29: 9-5-5
- Earnings: ¥1,461,265,500 (Note: Earnings earned overseas are converted to JPY using the formula provided by JRA. 2023, 2024, 2025.); JPN: 683,710,000 JPY; HK: 17,040,000 HKD; UAE: 2,900,000 USD

Major wins
- Yomiuri Milers Cup (2022, 2024); Keisei Hai Autumn Handicap (2023); Mile Championship (2024); Dubai Turf (2025)

Awards
- JRA Award for Best Miler (2024)
- Last updated on December 14, 2025

Soul Rush (Japanese: ソウルラッシュ, Hepburn: Souru Rasshu; foaled March 28, 2018) is a retired Japanese Thoroughbred racehorse best known for his victories in the 2024 Mile Championship and the 2025 Dubai Turf. He won the JRA Award for Best Sprinter or Miler in 2024.

== Racing career ==
=== 2020: two-year-old season ===
Soul Rush debuted on December 13, 2020, in a 2-year-old maiden race at Chukyo Racecourse (2000m, turf). Racing mid-pack early, he surged ahead in the final stretch to win by two lengths.

=== 2021: three-year-old season ===
In his second career start, the Asunaro Sho, he finished sixth. Subsequent races saw mixed results: fourth in the Shinryoku Sho (a six-horse field), sixth in a 1-win class dirt race, fourth, and seventh in another. After a four-month break, he returned to win a 1-win class mile race by one and a half lengths with a powerful late sprint. He capped the year with a victory in the Christmas Cup, securing his third win by half a length.

=== 2022: four-year-old season ===
Soul Rush began his four-year-old season with a dominant three-length victory in the Shunkyo Stakes, earning him open-class status. On April 24, he contested his first graded stakes race, the Group 2 Milers Cup at Hanshin Racecourse. Despite being sixth in betting odds, he rallied from the rear to overtake leaders Besten Dank and Ho O Amazon, clinching his first group win and extending his streak to four. His jockey Suguru Hamanaka celebrated his 1,100th JRA victory with this triumph. More than a month later, his debut in group 1 company, the Yasuda Kinen, ended in a disappointing 13th place. His first defeat at a distance of 1600 meters. After a summer break, he returned to finish a close second in the Fuji Stakes while carrying 3 kilograms more than the winner and fourth in the Mile Championship, marking his first top-five finish at group 1.

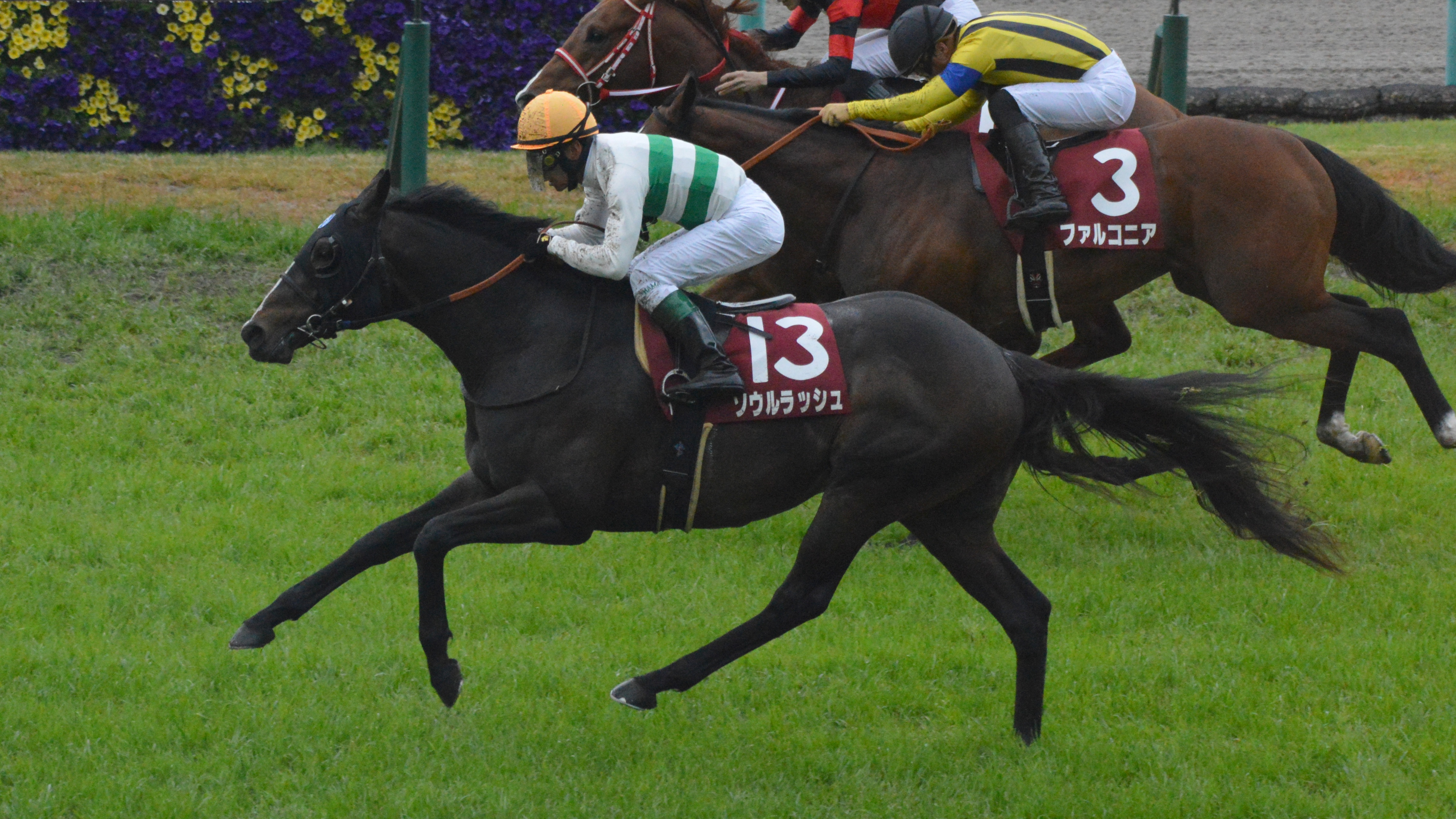
2022 Milers Cup

=== 2023: five-year-old season ===
Soul Rush aimed to defend his title in the Milers Cup but settled for third behind Schnell Meister and Gaia Force. More than a month later, a poor start in the Yasuda Kinen led to a ninth-place finish. He rebounded in the Keisei Hai Autumn Handicap, where he tracked in third to fourth position early and overtook Win Greatest at the wire to win by a neck, while carrying the top weight of 59 kilograms, for his first graded stakes victory in more than a year. In the Mile Championship, partnered with João Moreira for the first time, he surged through traffic in the stretch to take the lead but was narrowly passed by Namur at the line, settling for second place by a neck. In the Hong Kong Mile, he finished fourth behind Golden Sixty after he was unable to race smoothly.

=== 2024: six-year-old season ===
Soul Rush’s campaign began with a jockey change: originally scheduled Kohei Matsuyama was replaced by Taisei Danno due to Matsuyama’s injury ahead of the Milers Cup. From mid-pack, he powered through from the outside stretch to win by one and three-fourth lengths, securing his third group title and first victory in the race since 2022. In the Yasuda Kinen, he closed from the rear but finished third, about half a length behind Hong Kong’s Romantic Warrior. After a four-month break, he placed second in the Fuji Stakes, edged by Jun Blossom in a tight finish. On November 17, he dominated the Mile Championship, unleashing a blistering late charge from mid-rear to win by two and a half lengths over Elton Barows, claiming his maiden group 1 title on his seventh attempt. Cartier Racing Award Top Older Horse winner Charyn placed fifth. Jockey Danno was fined ¥50,000 for a premature celebratory pose before the finish line, which was deemed a breach of professional conduct. He concluded the year with a second place finish in the Hong Kong Mile, unable to overtake Voyage Bubble late.

=== 2025: seven-year-old season ===
Soul Rush opened his seven-year-old season with a third place finish in the Nakayama Kinen, hampered by a narrow path in the stretch.

On April 5, he triumphed in the Dubai Turf under Cristian Demuro. Saving ground in mid-pack before surging past Romantic Warrior in the final strides to win by a close nose. This victory marked his second group 1 title, his first overseas win, and the first international group 1 win for his trainer Yasutoshi Ikee.

Coming back home, he ran in the Yasuda Kinen for the fourth time in his career but ultimately finished third behind Jantar Mantar. Four days later it was announced that he had fractured his metacarpal bone and would need to rest until autumn.

In the autumn campaign, he raced in the Fuji Stakes. He finished in third place behind Gaia Force and Jantar Mantar. The next month, he ran in the Mile Championship which was the race he won in previous year. He broke sharply from the start and stayed mostly at seventh position but only managed to improve by one position in the end, finishing in sixth. His final race of the season would be the Hong Kong Mile. In the race, he ran excellently and gained the lead at 200 meter mark before Zac Purton who rode on Voyage Bubble, wrestled back the lead 50 meter to the line for the win.

On January 8 in the next year, he was officially retired from racing and removed from the JRA registry. Soul Rush would be assigned into the stud job at Breeders' Stallion Station in Hidaka, Hokkaido.

== Racing statistics ==
Below data is based on data available on JBIS Search, NetKeiba, Hong Kong Jockey Club, and Emirates Racing Authority.

Date	Track	Race	Grade	Distance (Condition)	Entry	HN	Odds (Favored)	Finish	Time	Margins	Jockey	Winner (Runner-up)
2020 – two-year-old season
Dec 13	Chukyo	2YO Debut		2,000 m (Firm)	11	11	4.2 (2)	1st	2:03.1	-0.3	Kiwamu Ogino	(Leighton Hill)
2021 – three-year-old season
Feb 14	Kokura	Asunaro Sho	1 win	2,000 m (Firm)	12	8	6.8 (4)	6th	2:01.3	0.8	Kiwamu Ogino	World Revival
Apr 24	Tokyo	Shinryoku Sho	1 win	2,300 m (Firm)	6	6	4.5 (3)	4th	2:19.1	0.7	Hironobu Tanabe	Albilla
May 16	Chukyo	3YO 1Win	1 win	1,800 m (Good)	15	5	7.1 (3)	6th	1:54.5	1.0	Kiwamu Ogino	Sweep the Board
Sep 11	Chukyo	3YO+ 1Win	1 win	2,000 m (Firm)	12	7	5.3 (4)	4th	1:59.8	0.4	Mirai Iwata	Jack d'Or
Oct 3	Chukyo	3YO+ 1Win	1 win	2,200 m (Firm)	16	9	5.8 (3)	7th	2:13.2	0.7	Kanichiro Fujii	T O Royal
Dec 4	Chukyo	3YO+ 1Win	1 win	1,600 m (Firm)	16	16	3.9 (2)	1st	1:33.6	-0.2	Suguru Hamanaka	(Memory Effect)
Dec 25	Nakayama	Christmas Cup	2 win	1,600 m (Good)	16	8	2.1 (1)	1st	1:34.1	-0.1	Suguru Hamanaka	(Win Charlotte)
2022 – four-year-old season
Mar 27	Nakayama	Shunkyo Stakes	3 win	1,600 m (Yielding)	16	8	2.2 (1)	1st	1:34.1	-0.3	Suguru Hamanaka	(Win Charlotte)
Apr 24	Hanshin	Milers Cup	GII	1,600 m (Good)	15	13	7.8 (6)	1st	1:33.3	-0.1	Suguru Hamanaka	(Ho O Amazon)
Jun 5	Tokyo	Yasuda Kinen	GI	1,600 m (Firm)	18	14	10.0 (6)	13th	1:32.9	0.6	Suguru Hamanaka	Songline
Oct 22	Tokyo	Fuji Stakes	GII	1,600 m (Firm)	15	13	4.4 (3)	2nd	1:32.1	0.1	Kohei Matsuyama	Serifos
Nov 20	Hanshin	Mile CS	GI	1,600 m (Firm)	17	11	7.7 (5)	4th	1:32.8	0.3	Kohei Matsuyama	Serifos
2023 – five-year-old season
Apr 23	Kyoto	Milers Cup	GII	1,600 m (Firm)	15	15	4.5 (3)	3rd	1:31.6	0.1	Kohei Matsuyama	Schnell Meister
Jun 4	Tokyo	Yasuda Kinen	GI	1,600 m (Firm)	18	10	10.8 (6)	9th	1.32.2	0.8	Kohei Matsuyama	Songline
Sep 10	Nakayama	Keisei Hai AH	GIII	1,600 m (Firm)	11	2	3.7 (2)	1st	1:31.6	0.0	Kohei Matsuyama	(Win Greatest)
Nov 19	Kyoto	Mile CS	GI	1,600 m (Firm)	16	1	5.8 (3)	2nd	1:32.5	0.0	João Moreira	Namur
Dec 10	Sha Tin	HK Mile	GI	1,600 m (Good)	14	5	12.0 (5)	4th	1:34.58	0.48	João Moreira	Golden Sixty
2024 – six-year-old season
Apr 21	Kyoto	Milers Cup	GII	1,600 m (Good)	17	14	2.4 (1)	1st	1:32.5	-0.3	Taisei Danno	(Serifos)
Jun 2	Tokyo	Yasuda Kinen	GI	1,600 m (Good)	18	10	4.0 (2)	3rd	1:32.4	0.1	João Moreira	Romantic Warrior
Oct 19	Tokyo	Fuji Stakes	GII	1,600 m (Firm)	17	11	3.2 (1)	2nd	1:32.2	0.1	Taisei Danno	Jun Blossom
Nov 17	Kyoto	Mile CS	GI	1,600 m (Firm)	17	13	5.3 (4)	1st	1:32.0	-0.4	Taisei Danno	(Elton Barows)
Dec 8	Sha Tin	HK Mile	GI	1,600 m (Firm)	14	1	4.0 (3)	2nd	1:33.53	0.19	João Moreira	Voyage Bubble
2025 – seven-year-old season
Mar 2	Nakayama	Nakayama Kinen	GII	1,800 m (Firm)	16	8	2.8 (1)	3rd	1:45.0	0.2	Taisei Danno	Sixpence
Apr 5	Meydan	Dubai Turf	GI	1,800 m (Good)	11	9	16.2 (4)	1st	1:45.84	0.0	Cristian Demuro	(Romantic Warrior)
Jun 8	Tokyo	Yasuda Kinen	GI	1,600 m (Firm)	18	13	3.3 (1)	3rd	1:33.0	0.3	Suguru Hamanaka	Jantar Mantar
Oct 18	Tokyo	Fuji Stakes	GII	1,600 m (Firm)	14	6	7.2 (4)	3rd	1:32.1	0.4	Taisei Danno	Gaia Force
Nov 23	Kyoto	Mile CS	GI	1,600 m (Firm)	18	17	5.2 (2)	6th	1:31.7	0.4	Cristian Demuro	Jantar Mantar
Dec 14	Sha Tin	HK Mile	GI	1,600 m (Firm)	14	1	7.3 (3)	2nd	1:33.54	0.07	Cristian Demuro	Voyage Bubble

Legend:
Turf Dirt

== Pedigree ==
Pedigree of Soul Rush (JPN), bay colt, 2018
Sire Rulership b. 2007	King Kamehameha b. 2001	Kingmambo (USA)	Mr. Prospector
Sire Rulership b. 2007	King Kamehameha b. 2001	Kingmambo (USA)	Miesque
Sire Rulership b. 2007	King Kamehameha b. 2001	Manfath (IRE)	Last Tycoon
Sire Rulership b. 2007	King Kamehameha b. 2001	Manfath (IRE)	Pilot Bird (GB)
Sire Rulership b. 2007	Air Groove b. 1993	Tony Bin (IRE)	Kampala (GB)
Sire Rulership b. 2007	Air Groove b. 1993	Tony Bin (IRE)	Severn Bridge (GB)
Sire Rulership b. 2007	Air Groove b. 1993	Dyna Carle	Northern Taste (CAN)
Sire Rulership b. 2007	Air Groove b. 1993	Dyna Carle	Shadai Feather
Dam Eternal Bouquet dk.b. 2013	Manhattan Cafe br. 1998	Sunday Silence (USA)	Halo
Dam Eternal Bouquet dk.b. 2013	Manhattan Cafe br. 1998	Sunday Silence (USA)	Wishing Well
Dam Eternal Bouquet dk.b. 2013	Manhattan Cafe br. 1998	Subtle Change (IRE)	Law Society (USA)
Dam Eternal Bouquet dk.b. 2013	Manhattan Cafe br. 1998	Subtle Change (IRE)	Santa Luciana (GER)
Dam Eternal Bouquet dk.b. 2013	Cat Ali (USA) b. 1999	Storm Cat	Storm Bird (CAN)
Dam Eternal Bouquet dk.b. 2013	Cat Ali (USA) b. 1999	Storm Cat	Terlingua
Dam Eternal Bouquet dk.b. 2013	Cat Ali (USA) b. 1999	Careless Kitten	Caro (IRE)
Dam Eternal Bouquet dk.b. 2013	Cat Ali (USA) b. 1999	Careless Kitten	T.C. Kitten (Family: 8-c)

- His dam's half-brother, Hiraboku Deep, won the 2013 Aoba Sho.
- His granddam Cat Ali's cousin, Hennessey, won the 1995 Hopeful Stakes.
