= Sixpence (horse) =

Japanese Thoroughbred racehorse

Sixpence シックスペンス
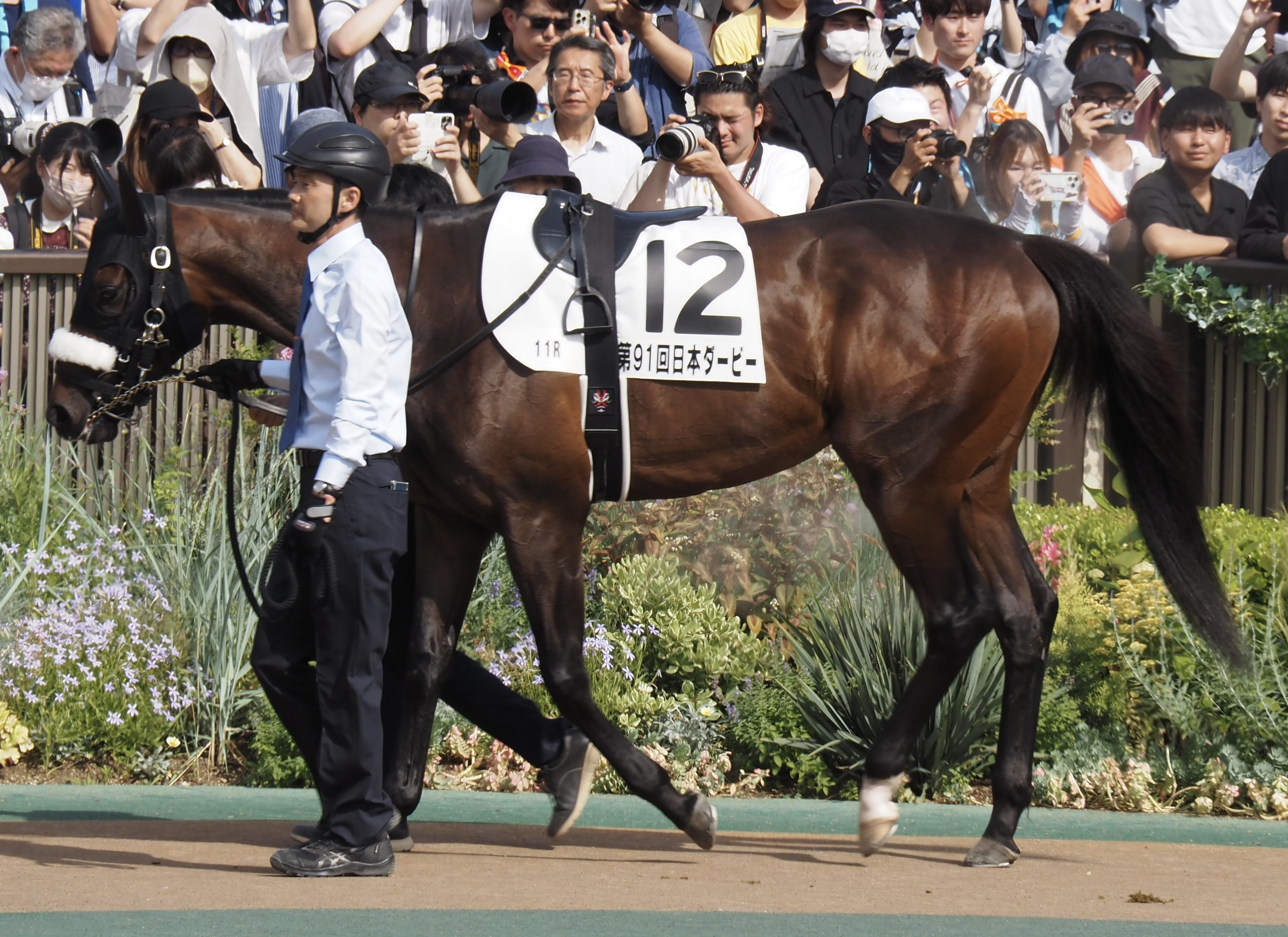
- Sixpence at the paddock of 2024 Tokyo Yushun
- Sire: Kizuna
- Grandsire: Deep Impact
- Dam: Finley'sluckycharm
- Damsire: Twirling Candy
- Sex: Stallion
- Foaled: 17 April 2021 (age 5)
- Country: Japan
- Colour: Bay
- Breeder: Northern Farm
- Owner: Carrot Farm
- Racing colours
- Trainer: Sakae Kunieda →Hiroyasu Tanaka
- Jockey: Christophe Lemaire; Yutaka Take
- Record: 15 : 6-1-0
- Earnings: 420,697,000 JPY

Major wins
- Spring Stakes (2024); Mainichi Ōkan (2024); Nakayama Kinen (2025); Yasuda Kinen (2026)
- Last updated on 7 June 2026

Sixpence (Japanese: シックスペンス; foaled 17 April 2021) is an active Japanese thoroughbred racehorse who won multiple group races, including the 2026 Yasuda Kinen.

He is named after the traditional British coin.

== Background ==
Sixpence was bred by Northern Farm in Japan, and was foaled on 17 April 2021. He was sired by Kizuna, who won the 2013 Japanese Derby, and out of the dam Finley's Lucky Charm, who won the 2018 Madison Stakes. He is trained by Hiroyasu Tanaka for owner Carrot Farm.

== Racing career ==
=== 2-year-old season (2023) ===
On September 10, 2023 he made his debut in a 2-year-old maiden race over 1600m on turf at Nakayama, with Christophe Lemaire aboard him. He stayed in the front mostly at third position before sprinting forward at the end phase to win by a head against Atarayo. He closed the season with a run at the Hiiragi Sho with Yukito Ishikawa as his jockey. In this race, he chased the leading group and easily pulled away in the straight to win by a length and a half, securing his second consecutive victory.

=== 3-year-old season (2024) ===
Sixpence started his new season when he won the Spring Stakes by three and a half lengths ahead of Allegro Brillante, under Lemaire again. Despite earning the automatic berth to the Satsuki Sho, it was announced that he would forego that race and go straight for the Tokyo Yushun instead, as he was found to be lame after the Spring Stakes. He ran in the Tokyo Yushun on May 26, but his run went wild and uncontrollable as he failed to accelerate in the final straight and finished in ninth.

He took a rest during the summer and returned for the autumn campaign at the Mainichi Okan in Tokyo. In this race, he bounced back to form when he made a strong run in the end to overtake Ho O Biscuits before the line, winning by a neck and getting his second graded stakes win. He was meant to be prepared to race the Mile Championship in November but his trainer, Sakae Kunieda, cancelled the participation after they found his gait irregular due to inflammation of his right front hoof. He decided that Sixpence would be focusing on treatment for the rest of the season.

=== 4-year-old season (2025) ===
In his return, Sixpence trained for the upcoming Nakayama Kinen in March. He stayed in the middle of the pack for the majority of the race, triggered his finishing burst on the inside track, overtook Ecoro Walz and won the race by a nose in record time. Then, he ran in both Osaka Hai and Yasuda Kinen but he failed to make impressions and trigger another gear in either race, finishing in seventh and 12th respectively.

In autumn, Kunieda diverted him for a campaign on dirt track and aiming for the Mile Championship Nambu Hai in Morioka. Despite changing jockey once again with Norifumi Mikamoto on the saddle, he made a good debut on the new track as he finished in second place four lengths behind the winner, Wilson Tesoro. Sixpence closed the season with a run at the Champions Cup where he rallied the lead early but faded out as the race went on and finished in 11th place.

=== 5-year-old season (2026) ===
Despite his poor previous run on dirt, Sixpence would participate in the February Stakes for his season opener. When the race began, he set up the pace after 300 metres. He ran gamely along the way but faded out at 100 metres to the line and ended up in ninth place. At the end of February, Kunieda retired from training, leading to his stable's dissolution. Sixpence would be transferred to Hiroyasu Tanaka's stable. Following the transfer, he would switch back to turf races, running in the Yomiuri Milers Cup. On the race, he tracked in the middle of the pack during the race but failed to take the lead and finished seventh. His jockey for the day, Keita Tosaki, quoted, "He had much better balance compared to the previous race and ran well. The pace was fast, but he was able to handle it and came through at the end." He was then registered for the Yasuda Kinen next, but with an initially unspecified jockey. After Admire Zoom, another horse who had registered for the Yasuda Kinen, suffered a right front hoof injury a few days before the race, the horse's jockey Yutaka Take would elect to ride Sixpence instead for that race. Starting from the fourth gate, Sixpence quickly seized second position as World's End shot out to a three-length lead. They held that order into the long Tokyo homestretch with World's End tenaciously clinging to the lead up to the final 50 meters. Take then rode the horse up outside the World's End and came to even terms as the favourite, Gaia Force, closed fast on his outside. Sixpence won by a neck with World's End and Gaia Force in a dead heat for second and third. After the race, Take reflected and quoted about the race:

I think we did a really good job. It was a last-minute ride, but I'm happy we were able to deliver the result. Before the race, I had a long discussion with trainer Hiroyasu Tanaka, and he told me, 'We've been training him so he can stick on even if he races forward."

This would be the first G1 win for Sixpence and also the fourth Yasuda Kinen win for Take himself, which he last won back in 2009 with Vodka. For future races, Carrot Farm representative Machiko Kuroda already registered the horse to run at the Prix Jacques Le Marois in Deauville-La Touques Racecourse, but would assess his condition and discuss with Tanaka first. On 28 June, Carrot Farm officially confirmed on their website that Sixpence would indeed head to the Prix Jacques Le Marois, with Take continuing to jockey him. On the day, Sixpence and his fellow compatriot, Strauss raced along the outside rail, separated from the rest of the field. In the late race, Sixpence faded away from the race and finished tenth. Both Take and Tanaka thought the horse might have some breathing problems before the race, which probably the cause of him slowing down at the end.

== Racing form ==
Sixpence won six races out of 14 starts. This data is available based on JBIS and netkeiba.

Date	Course	Race	Class	Distance (Condition)	Field	HN	Odds (Favored)	Finish	Time	Winning (Losing) Margin	Jockey	Winner (2nd Place)	Ref
2023 – two-year-old season
Sep 10	Nakayama	Two Year Old Debut		Turf 1,600 m (Firm)	13	6	1.5 (1)	1st	1:37.1	head	Christophe Lemaire	(Atarayo)	
Dec 17	Nakayama	Hiiragi Sho	1 Win	Turf 1,600 m (Firm)	9	6	3.2 (2)	1st	1:35.5	1 1/2 lengths	Yukito Ishikawa	(Pod Theo)	
2024 – three-year-old season
Mar 17	Nakayama	Spring Stakes	GII	Turf 1,800 m (Firm)	10	4	2.9 (1)	1st	1:49.4	3 1/2 lengths	Christophe Lemaire	(Allegro Brillante)	
May 26	Tokyo	Tokyo Yushun	GI	Turf 2,400 m (Firm)	17	12	8.3 (3)	9th	2:25.3	(6 lengths)	Yuga Kawada	Danon Decile	
Oct 6	Tokyo	Mainichi Okan	GII	Turf 1,800 m (Firm)	14	11	3.5 (1)	1st	1:45.1	neck	Christophe Lemaire	(Ho O Biscuits)	
2025 – four-year-old season
Mar 2	Nakayama	Nakayama Kinen	GII	Turf 1,800 m (Firm)	16	1	3.1 (2)	1st	R1:44.8	nose	Christophe Lemaire	(Ecoro Walz)	
Apr 6	Hanshin	Osaka Hai	GI	Turf 2,000 m (Firm)	15	10	4.8 (1)	7th	1:56.6	(2 3/4 lengths)	Takeshi Yokoyama	Bellagio Opera	
Jun 8	Tokyo	Yasuda Kinen	GI	Turf 1,600 m (Firm)	18	1	4.4 (3)	12th	1:33.4	(4 lengths)	Christophe Lemaire	Jantar Mantar	
Oct 13	Morioka	Mile Championship Nambu Hai	JpnI	Dirt 1,600 m (Fast)	16	14	9.5 (5)	2nd	1:34.9	(4 lengths)	Norifumi Mikamoto	Wilson Tesoro	
Dec 7	Chukyo	Champions Cup	GI	Dirt 1,800 m (Fast)	16	11	10.2 (5)	11th	1:51.5	(8 1/4 lengths)	Christophe Lemaire	W Heart Bond	
2026 – five-year-old season
Feb 22	Tokyo	February Stakes	GI	Dirt 1,600 m (Fast)	16	5	17.4 (6)	9th	1:36.4	(6 1/4 lengths)	Keita Tosaki	Costa Nova	
Apr 26	Kyoto	Yomiuri Milers Cup	GII	Turf 1,600 m (Firm)	18	16	7.8 (4)	7th	1:32.1	(2 lengths)	Keita Tosaki	Admire Zoom	
Jun 7	Tokyo	Yasuda Kinen	GI	Turf 1,600 m (Firm)	17	4	21.6 (8)	1st	1:32.1	neck	Yutaka Take	(World's End)	
Jun 7	Tokyo	Yasuda Kinen	GI	Turf 1,600 m (Firm)	17	4	21.6 (8)	1st	1:32.1	neck	Yutaka Take	(Gaia Force)	
Aug 16	Deauville	Prix Jacques le Marois	GI	Turf 1,600 m (Good to Soft)	10	3	20.4 (7)	10th	1:39.55	(21 3/4 lengths)	Yutaka Take	Rayif	
Nov 22	Kyoto	Mile Championship	GI	Turf 1,600 m (Firm)	18	4	36.5 (10)	18th	1:33.5	(11 1/2 lengths)	Alexis Pouchin	Erdenali	

- Domestic grade races (Jpn) was labeled as Listed internationally.
- R on the time indicates that this was a record time

== Pedigree ==
Pedigree of Sixpence (JPN), bay stallion, 2021
Sire Kizuna (JPN) 2010	Deep Impact (JPN); 2002	Sunday Silence (USA)	Halo
Sire Kizuna (JPN) 2010	Deep Impact (JPN); 2002	Sunday Silence (USA)	Wishing Well
Sire Kizuna (JPN) 2010	Deep Impact (JPN); 2002	Wind in Her Hair (IRE)	Alzao (USA)
Sire Kizuna (JPN) 2010	Deep Impact (JPN); 2002	Wind in Her Hair (IRE)	Burghclere (GB)
Sire Kizuna (JPN) 2010	Catequil (CAN); 1990	Storm Cat (USA)	Storm Bird (CAN)
Sire Kizuna (JPN) 2010	Catequil (CAN); 1990	Storm Cat (USA)	Terlingua
Sire Kizuna (JPN) 2010	Catequil (CAN); 1990	Pacific Princess (USA)	Damascus (USA)
Sire Kizuna (JPN) 2010	Catequil (CAN); 1990	Pacific Princess (USA)	Fiji (GB)
Dam Finley'sluckycharm (USA) 2013	Twirling Candy (USA); 2007	Candy Ride	Ride the Rails
Dam Finley'sluckycharm (USA) 2013	Twirling Candy (USA); 2007	Candy Ride	Candy Girl
Dam Finley'sluckycharm (USA) 2013	Twirling Candy (USA); 2007	House of Danzig	Chester House
Dam Finley'sluckycharm (USA) 2013	Twirling Candy (USA); 2007	House of Danzig	Danzig Crown
Dam Finley'sluckycharm (USA) 2013	Day of Victory (USA); 2005	Victory Gallop	Cryptoclearance
Dam Finley'sluckycharm (USA) 2013	Day of Victory (USA); 2005	Victory Gallop	Victorous Lil
Dam Finley'sluckycharm (USA) 2013	Day of Victory (USA); 2005	Gather the Day	Dayjur
Dam Finley'sluckycharm (USA) 2013	Day of Victory (USA); 2005	Gather the Day	Gather The Clan

- Sixpence was inbred M4 × M4 to Cryptoclearance and M5 × M5 to Danzig.
