= Keisei Hai Autumn Handicap =

Keisei Hai Autumn Handicap 京成杯オータムハンデキャップ
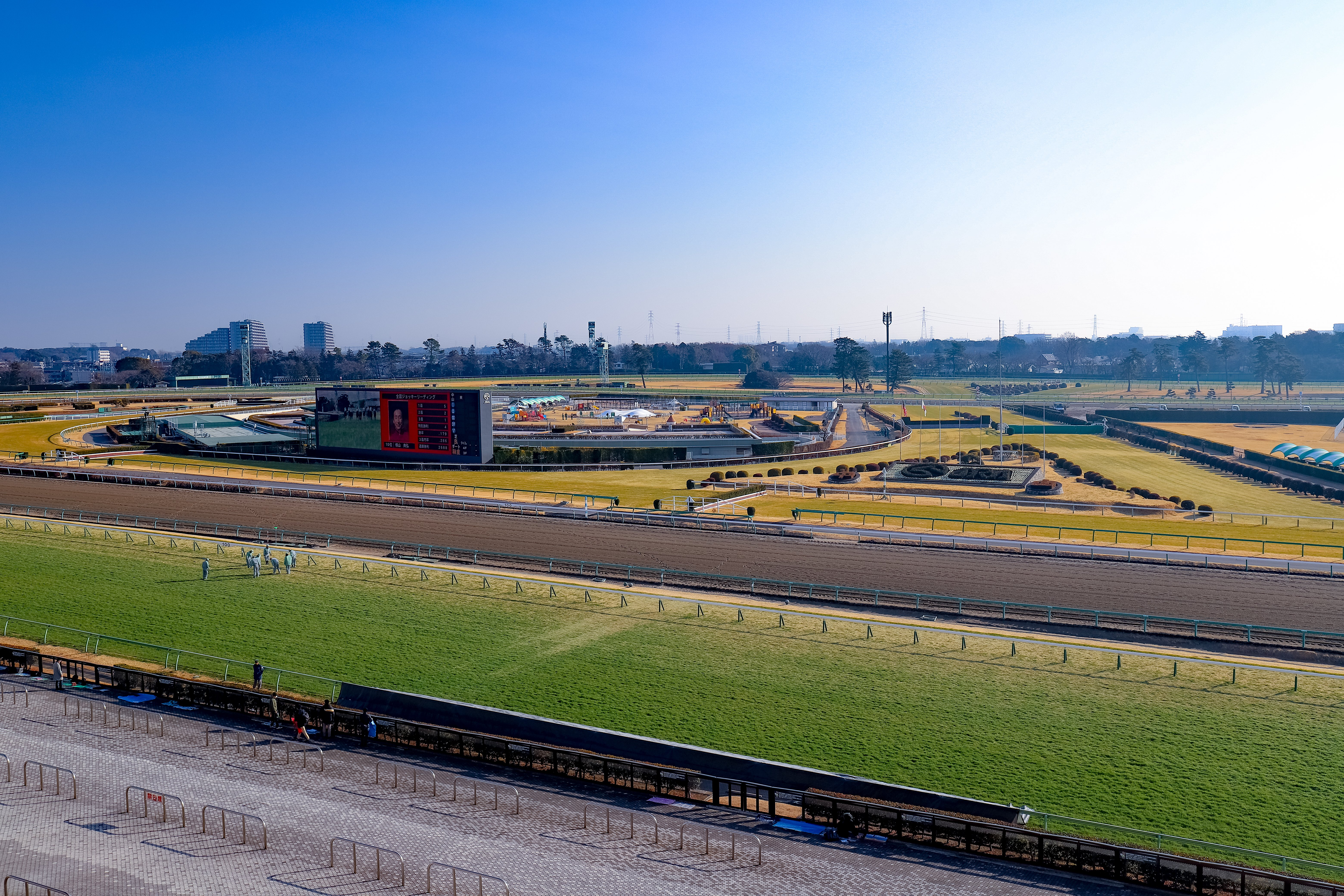
- Nakayama Racecourse
- Class: Grade 3
- Location: Nakayama Racecourse
- Inaugurated: 1956
- Race type: Thoroughbred Flat racing

Race information
- Distance: 1600 metres
- Surface: Turf
- Track: Right-handed
- Qualification: 3-y-o+
- Weight: Handicap
- Purse: ¥ 87,960,000 (as of 2025): 1st: ¥ 41,000,000; 2nd: ¥ 16,000,000; 3rd: ¥ 10,000,000

The Keisei Hai Autumn Handicap (Japanese 京成杯オータムハンデキャップ) is a Japanese Grade 3 horse race for Thoroughbreds aged three and over, run in September over a distance of 1600 metres on turf at Nakayama Racecourse.

It was first run in 1956 and has held Grade 3 status since 1984. The race was switched back and forth between Nakayama and Tokyo and run over several different distances in its early years before settling at its current venue and distance in 1984. The 1988 edition however took place at Niigata Racecourse.

== Winners since 2000 ==
| Year | Winner | Age | Jockey | Trainer | Owner | Time |
|---|---|---|---|---|---|---|
| 2000 | Symboli Indy | 4 | Yukio Okabe | Kazuo Fujisawa | Symboli Stud | 1:34.5 |
| 2001 | Zenno El Cid | 4 | Norihiro Yokoyama | Kazuo Fujisawa | Shinobu Osako | 1:31.5 |
| 2002 | Breaktime | 5 | Mikio Matsunaga | Shoji Yamamoto | North Hills Management | 1:31.9 |
| 2003 | Breaktime | 6 | Mikio Matsunaga | Shoji Yamamoto | North Hills Management | 1:33.9 |
| 2004 | Meiner Morgen | 4 | Hiroki Goto | Masahiro Horii | Thoroughbred Club Ruffian | 1:32.8 |
| 2005 | Meiner Morgen | 5 | Yoshitomi Shibata | Masahiro Horii | Thoroughbred Club Ruffian | 1:33.3 |
| 2006 | Suteki Shinsukekun | 3 | Hiroki Goto | Hideyuki Mori | Yoshinori Sakae | 1:32.0 |
| 2007 | Kings Trail | 5 | Katsuharu Tanaka | Kazuo Fujisawa | Sunday Racing | 1:32.6 |
| 2008 | Kiss To Heaven | 5 | Shinji Fujita | Hirofumi Toda | Kazuko Yoshida | 1:32.1 |
| 2009 | Zarema | 5 | Hiroyuki Uchida | Hidetaka Otonahi | Teruya Yoshida | 1:32.1 |
| 2010 | Fireflaught | 4 | Akihide Tsumura | Michihiro Ogasa | Hiroyoshi Usuda | 1:32.8 |
| 2011 | Fifth Petal | 5 | Norihiro Yokoyama | Yukihiro Kato | Carrot Farm | 1:31.9 |
| 2012 | Leo Active | 3 | Norihiro Yokoyama | Hiroaki Sugiura | Hiroyuki Tanaka | 1:30.7 |
| 2013 | Excellente Cave | 4 | Keita Tosaki | Noriyuki Hori | Teruya Yoshida | 1:31.8 |
| 2014 | Clarente | 5 | Hironobu Tanabe | Kojiro Hahiguchi | Shinji Maeda | 1:33.3 |
| 2015 | Fra Angelico | 7 | Hironobu Tanabe | Makoto Saito | Sunday Racling | 1:33.3 |
| 2016 | Lord Quest | 3 | Kenichi Ikezoe | Shigeyuki Kojima | Lord Horse Club | 1:33.0 |
| 2017 | Grand Silk | 5 | Hironobu Tanabe | Hirofumi Toda | Silk Racing | 1:31.6 |
| 2018 | Mikki Glory | 5 | Christophe Lemaire | Sakae Kunieda | Noda Mizuki | 1:32.4 |
| 2019 | Trois Etoiles | 4 | Norihiro Yokoyama | Takayuki Yasuda | Shadai Race Horse | 1:30.3 |
| 2020 | Trois Etoiles | 5 | Norihiro Yokoyama | Takayuki Yasuda | Shadai Race Horse | 1:33.9 |
| 2021 | Catedral | 5 | Keita Tosaki | Manabu Ikezoe | Carrot Farm | 1:32.0 |
| 2022 | Falconia | 5 | Hayato Yoshida | Tomokazu Takano | Shadai Race Horse | 1:33.6 |
| 2023 | Soul Rush | 5 | Kohei Matsuyama | Yasutoshi Ikee | Tatsue Ishikawa | 1:31.6 |
| 2024 | Ascoli Piceno | 3 | Christophe Lemaire | Yoichi Kuroiwa | Sunday Racing | 1:30.8 |
| 2025 | Ho O Las Cases | 7 | Takuya Kowata | Noboru Takagi | Yoshihisa Ozasa | 1:31.3 |
| 2026 | Piko Rose | 4 | Kosei Miura | Daishi Ito | Bijoupiko Co. Ltd. | 1:32.0 |

== Earlier winners ==
- 1956 - Higashi Terao
- 1957 - Tametomo
- 1958 - Topaz
- 1959 - Haku Kurama
- 1960 - Yamatono Hana
- 1961 - Star Roch
- 1962 - Asayuki
- 1963 - Toki Queen
- 1964 - Hayato O
- 1965 - Soryu
- 1966 - Hama Tesso
- 1967 - Speed King
- 1968 - Sweet Flag
- 1969 - Light World
- 1970 - Kurishiba
- 1971 - Pearlton
- 1972 - Toyo Asahi
- 1973 - Rafale
- 1974 - Sugano Homare
- 1975 - Nasuno Chigusa
- 1976 - Raiba Foot
- 1977 - Kashu Chikara
- 1978 - Karlsbad
- 1979 - Bingo Garoo
- 1980 - Sakura Shingeki
- 1981 - Sakura Shingeki
- 1982 - Juji Arrow
- 1983 - Kiyo Hidaka
- 1984 - Yoshido Eden
- 1985 - Erebus
- 1986 - Island Goddess
- 1987 - Dyna Gulliver
- 1988 - Hokuto Helios
- 1989 - Material
- 1990 - Oratorio
- 1991 - Valiente
- 1992 - Toshi Green
- 1993 - Meistersinger
- 1994 - Sakura Chitose O
- 1995 - Dojima Muteki
- 1996 - Crown City
- 1997 - Kurokami
- 1998 - Shinko Splendor
- 1999 - Sunrise Atlas

== See also ==
- Horse racing in Japan
- List of Japanese flat horse races
