= 1351 Turf Sprint =

Thoroughbred Horse Race in Saudi Arabia

- Class: Group 2
- Location: Riyadh, Saudi Arabia
- Inaugurated: 2020
- Race type: Thoroughbred – Flat racing
- Website: https://jcsa.sa/en/saudi-cup/

Race information
- Distance: 1,351 meters
- Surface: Turf
- Track: King Abdulaziz Racetrack
- Weight: https://jcsa.sa/en/racing/rules/
- Purse: $2,000,000

1351 Turf Sprint (Arabic: كأس ال 1351 للسرعة) is a Group 2 flat throughbred horse race held at King Abdulaziz Racetrack in Riyadh, Saudi Arabia.

== Race details ==
The race was founded by the Saudi Arabia Jockey Club in 2020. 1351 Turf Sprint is a part of Saudi Cup Night. It is run at 1,351 meters on turf, open to four-year-old thoroughbreds and above, with a prize money of $2 million as in 2026.

The 1351 Turf Sprint was named after the founding of the Kingdom of Saudi Arabia in 1351 of Islamic Year (1932).

== History ==
The 1351 Turf Sprint was officially inaugurated in 2020 by the Jockey Club of Saudi Arabia as undercard race of the Saudi Cup.

In 2022 the race then promoted to International Group 3 race and the prize money increased to $1.5 million.

In 2024 the race was promoted again to International Group 2 and the prize money has been increased to $2 million.

== Winners ==
Year	Winner	Foaled	Age	Jockey	Trainer	Owner	Time
2020	Dark Power	Ireland	6	Frankie Dettori	Allan Smith	Al Adiyat Racing	1:19.63
2021	Space Blues	Ireland	5	William Buicks	Charlie Appleby	Godolphin	1:20.03
2022	Songline	Japan	4	Christophe Lemaire	Toru Hayashi	Sunday Racing Co.Ltd	1:18.00
2023	Bathrat Leon	Japan	5	Ryusei Sakai	Yoshito Yahagi	Hiroo Race Co.Ltd	1:17.49
2024	Annaf	Ireland	5	Rossa Ryan	Micheal Appbleby	Fosnic Racing	1:17.875
2025	Ascoli Piceno	Japan	4	Christophe Lemaire	Yoichi Kuroiwa	Sunday Racing Co.Ltd	1:17.879
2026	Reef Runner	United States	5	Irad Ortiz Jr.	David Fawkes	Alex and JoAnn Lieblong	1:18.238

== Records ==
Speed Record

- 1:17.49 — Bathrat Leon (2023)

Most Wins by Jockey

- 2 — Christophe Lemaire (2022,2025)

== See also ==
- Horse in Saudi Arabia
