= Gaia Force =

Japanese-bred Thoroughbred racehorse

Gaia Force ガイアフォース
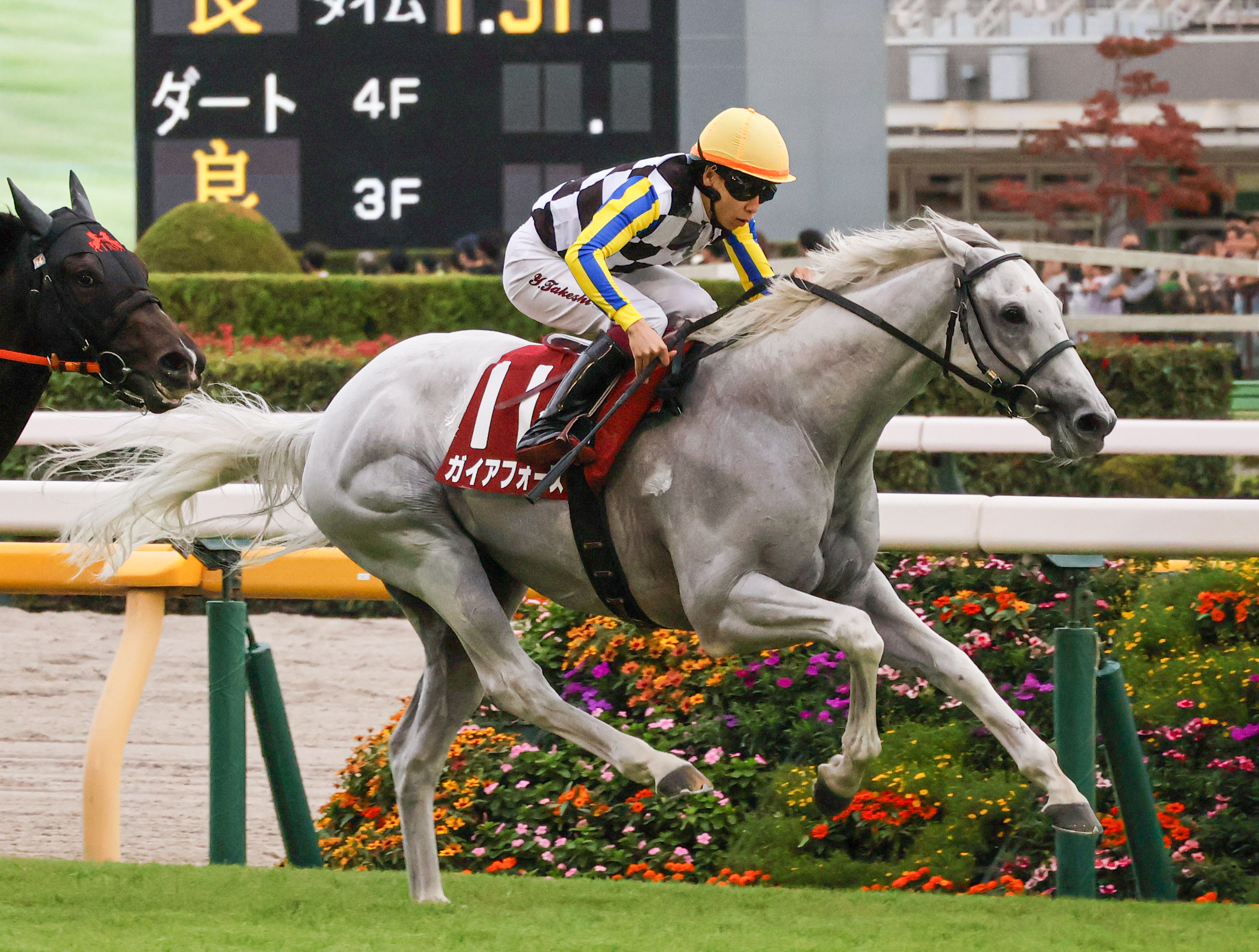
- Gaia Force winning the 2025 Fuji Stakes
- Breed: Thoroughbred
- Sire: Kitasan Black
- Grandsire: Black Tide
- Dam: Natale
- Damsire: Kurofune
- Sex: Stallion
- Foaled: February 21, 2019 (age 7); Abira, Hokkaido, Japan
- Country: Japan
- Color: Gray
- Breeder: Oiwake Farm
- Owner: KR Japan
- Racing colours
- Trainer: Haruki Sugiyama
- Jockey: Kohei Matsuyama; Atsuya Nishimura; Yoshihito Nagaoka; Takeshi Yokoyama
- Record: 22: 4-7-0
- Earnings: 505,740,000 JPY

Major wins
- St Lite Kinen (2022); Fuji Stakes (2025)
- Last updated on December 30, 2025

Gaia Force (Japanese: ガイアフォース, Hepburn: Gaia Fōsu; foaled February 21, 2019) is an active Japanese racehorse.

== Background ==
Gaia Force was born on February 21, 2019, at the Oiwake Farm. He was sired by Kitasan Black, who won 7 Grade I races in his career and also produced Equinox that season. His dam, Natale, was a Kurofune progeny who won several NAR graded races in her career including the Crown Cup and the Totsuka Kinen in 2011, as well as the ORO Cup in 2012 and 2013.

Gaia Force was sold at the JRHA Select Sale's Foal Session for 30,000,000 JPY to KR Japan. He was then sent to the Haruki Sugiyama stable at Ritto Training Center for training.

The name Gaia Force is derived from "the force of the Greek god Gaia."

== Racing career ==
=== 2021: two-year-old season ===
Gaia Force debuted at a maiden race of 1800 meters for 2 year olds at Kokura Racecourse with Kohei Matsuyama as his jockey, where he was beaten by a neck by future Derby winner Do Deuce.

=== 2022: three-year-old season ===
After taking a six months long break, Gaia Force was entered in to a maiden race of 2000 meters at Hanshin Racecourse, where he handily won the race by four lengths. He was then sent to the Azusa Sho, where he was the most favored to win, but could not catch up to Saint Camellia and finished second. His next race, the Kunisaki Tokubetsu, saw him taking the lead at the fourth corner and finishing the race with a seven length lead, setting a course record of 1:56.8. He was then entered in to his first graded race, the St Lite Kinen, where the horse would contest the lead from the middle of the pack and go neck-and-neck with Ask Victor More before beating him by a head, earning him his first graded race victory. The horse was then sent to contest his first Grade I race, the Kikuka-shō, where he was once again the most favored to win, but lost after losing momentum on the final stretch. Sugiyama later commented "The starting gate was everything. The horse was surrounded when it mattered the most. The horse never raced this kind of race and lost concentration halfway through. Maybe it also had to do with the distance."

=== 2023: four-year-old season ===
Gaia Force started his four year old season with the American Jockey Club Cup. He was once again the most favored to win, but could not take the lead and finished fifth. After a three months break, Gaia Force ran his first mile race, the Yomiuri Milers Cup, on April 23, with Atsuya Nishimura as his new jockey. Gaia Force was placed in the back of the pack before catching up with the lead on the home stretch, ultimately finishing second behind Schnell Meister by a neck. Nishimura later commented "He was doing pretty well despite being his first mile race, and showed good legs. He's also maneuverable, so I think it would be all right even if the distance becomes longer". On June 4, he ran the Yasuda Kinen, where he finished fourth behind Songline after trying to catch up to the leader. After this he ran several races with Nishimura, placing 4th to 6th in all of his races that season.

=== 2024: five-year-old season ===
Gaia Force started the season with his first dirt race, the February Stakes; with Yoshihito Nagaoka as his new jockey. Gaia Force ran 8th in the pack, before picking up the pace and finishing second place after Sekifu and Tagano Beauty contested the position. After the race, Nagaoka commented "The horse seemed worried about the kick-backs along the way, but the horse managed to persevere. The pace was smooth and worked in favor for the horse, and the horse ran well, and didn't do too bad on the dirt track"

After the February Stakes, the horse was briefly planned to race the Queen Elizabeth Stakes held at Randwick Racecourse in Australia, but a fracture in the left metacarpal scrapped such plans. When interviewed, Sugiyama stated that if the horse healed well, the horse would race the Yasuda Kinen on June 2.

The horse made a successful recovery, and was entered to contest the Yasuda Kinen, where his jockey trailed the Hong Kong challenger Romantic Warrior but was blocked on the final stretch and finished fourth behind Romantic Warrior.

Gaia Force would finish the season with the Champions Cup but finished 15th after a bad start from the outside.

=== 2025: six-year-old season ===
Gaia Force was once again entered to the February Stakes but finished 7th. Following this, Gaia Force was sent to his first race abroad, the Champions Mile held at Hong Kong's Sha Tin Racecourse, but finished 9th there.

On June 8th, Gaia Force once again raced the Yasuda Kinen. He was only the 9th most favored to win, but made headway on the final stretch, finishing second behind Jantar Mantar. Gaia Force's jockey, Seinosuke Yoshimura, commented "putting on blinkers [on the horse] worked out" after the race.

On September 5, the Chuo Keiba PR Center announced that a plush toy of him would be created after he received the second most votes in the active racehorse category for the "Idol Horse Audition 2025."

On October 18, Gaia Force was entered in to the Fuji Stakes, where he ran second for most of the race, before taking the lead on the final stretch, earning his first victory in over 3 years. On November 23, Gaia Force entered the Mile Championship, where the horse trailed Jantar Mantar, and raced out of the pack on the final stretch. While he could not beat Jantar Mantar, Gaia Force managed to finish second.

=== 2026: seven-year-old season ===
The first race he would join would be the Dubai Turf in March. He was supposed to be ridden by Yokoyama but changed to Ryusei Sakai just before the race. In the race, Gaia Force took the lead early on in the front for the majority of the race but fade out in the end section and finished in sixth place. When Gaia Force returned to Japan, he would be racing in the Yasuda Kinen in early June. At the early phase of the race, Gaia Force who came as the favourite settled himself in mid-division around ninth or tenth position and turned in the fastest finishing speed from 400 meters out to reach contention at the top of the hill, but was just short of reaching the leader, Sixpence by a neck margin while crossing the wire in a dead heat for second place with World's End.

== Racing statistics ==
The following data is based on information available on JBIS-Search, netkeiba.com, the Hong Kong Jockey Club and Emirates Racing Authority.

Date	Track	Race	Grade	Distance (condition)	Entry	HN	Odds (Favored)	Finish	Time	Margins	Jockey	Winner (Runner-up)
2021 – two-year-old season
Sep 5	Kokura	2YO Debut Race		1800 m (Firm)	13	10	9.3 (3)	2nd	1:50.3	0.1	Kohei Matsuyama	Do Deuce
2022 – three-year-old season
Mar 12	Hanshin	3YO Maiden Race		2000 m (Firm)	16	15	2.5 (1)	1st	2:00.4	-0.7	Kohei Matsuyama	(Black Shield)
May 14	Chukyo	Azusa Sho	1-Win	2000 m (Soft)	9	6	1.6 (1)	2nd	1:59.8	0.2	Kohei Matsuyama	Saint Camellia
Jul 3	Kokura	Kunisaki Tokubetsu	1-Win	2000 m (Firm)	10	2	1.4 (1)	1st	1:56.8 (Note: Set a race record for the event)	-1.1	Kohei Matsuyama	(Success Drake)
Sep 19	Nakayama	St Lite Kinen	2	2200 m (Good)	13	9	5.1 (3)	1st	2:11.8	0.0	Kohei Matsuyama	(Ask Victor More)
Oct 23	Kyoto	Kikuka-shō	1	3000 m (Firm)	18	1	3.5 (1)	8th	3:04.0	1.6	Kohei Matsuyama	Ask Victor More
2023 – four-year-old season
Jan 22	Nakayama	American Jockey Club Cup	2	2200 m (Firm)	14	10	1.8 (1)	5th	2:14.0	0.5	Christophe Lemaire	North Bridge
Apr 23	Kyoto	Yomiuri Milers Cup	2	1600 m (Firm)	15	7	8.2 (4)	2nd	1:31.5	0.0	Atsuya Nishimura	Schnell Meister
Jun 4	Tokyo	Yasuda Kinen	1	1600 m (Firm)	18	7	19.0 (8)	4th	1:31.6	0.2	Atsuya Nishimura	Songline
Sep 24	Nakayama	Sankei Sho All Comers	2	2200 m (Firm)	15	7	4.9 (2)	5th	2:12.4	0.4	Atsuya Nishimura	Rousham Park
Oct 29	Tokyo	Tenno Sho (Autumn)	1	2000 m (Firm)	11	5	45.4 (7)	5th	1:56.2	1.0	Atsuya Nishimura	Equinox
Dec 2	Hanshin	Challenge Cup	3	2000 m (Firm)	13	6	2.4 (1)	6th	1:59.2	0.4	Atsuya Nishimura	Bellagio Opera
2024 – five-year-old season
Feb 18	Tokyo	February Stakes	1	1600 m (Fast)	16	7	13.5 (5)	2nd	1:35.9	0.2	Yoshihito Nagaoka	Peptide Nile
Jun 2	Tokyo	Yasuda Kinen	1	1600 m (Firm)	18	2	11.6 (5)	4th	1:32.6	0.3	Yoshihito Nagaoka	Romantic Warrior
Dec 1	Chukyo	Champions Cup	1	2000 m (Fast)	16	16	13.7 (5)	15th	1:53.7	1.0	Yoshihito Nagaoka	Lemon Pop
2025 – six-year-old season
Feb 23	Tokyo	February Stakes	1	1600 m (Fast)	16	15	11.9 (6)	7th	1:36.5	1.0	Yoshihito Nagaoka	Costa Nova
Apr 27	Sha Tin	Champions Mile	1	1600 m (Good)	13	3	47.0 (7)	9th	1:33.9	0.7	Yuga Kawada	Red Lion
Jun 8	Tokyo	Yasuda Kinen	1	1600 m (Firm)	18	7	32.2 (9)	2nd	1:32.9	0.2	Seinosuke Yoshimura	Jantar Mantar
Oct 18	Tokyo	Fuji Stakes	2	1600 m (Firm)	14	11	7.1 (3)	1st	1:31.7	-0.1	Takeshi Yokoyama	(Jantar Martar)
Nov 23	Kyoto	Mile Championship	1	1600 m (Firm)	18	6	8.6 (4)	2nd	1:31.6	0.3	Takeshi Yokoyama	Jantar Mantar
2026 – seven-year-old season
Mar 28	Meydan	Dubai Turf	1	1800 m (Good)	11	2	12.5 (4)	6th	1:48.1	0.6	Ryusei Sakai	Ombudsman
Jun 7	Tokyo	Yasuda Kinen	1	1600 m (Firm)	17	14	2.9 (1)	2nd	1:32.1	0.0	Takeshi Yokoyama	Sixpence
Nov 22	Kyoto	Mile Championship	1	1600 m (Firm)	18	11	10.4 (6)	6th	1:32.1	0.3	Atsuya Nishimura	Erdenali

Legend:
Turf Dirt

== Pedigree ==
Pedigree of Gaia Force
Sire Kitasan Black 2012 Bay	Black Tide; 2001 Dark Bay	Sunday Silence	Halo
Sire Kitasan Black 2012 Bay	Black Tide; 2001 Dark Bay	Sunday Silence	Wishing Well
Sire Kitasan Black 2012 Bay	Black Tide; 2001 Dark Bay	Wind in Her Hair	Alzao
Sire Kitasan Black 2012 Bay	Black Tide; 2001 Dark Bay	Wind in Her Hair	Burghclere
Sire Kitasan Black 2012 Bay	Sugar Heart; 2005 Bay	Sakura Bakushin O	Sakura Yutaka O
Sire Kitasan Black 2012 Bay	Sugar Heart; 2005 Bay	Sakura Bakushin O	Sakura Hagoromo
Sire Kitasan Black 2012 Bay	Sugar Heart; 2005 Bay	Otome Gokoro	Judge Angelucci
Sire Kitasan Black 2012 Bay	Sugar Heart; 2005 Bay	Otome Gokoro	Tizly
Dam Natale 2008 Gray	Kurofune; 1998 Gray	French Deputy	Deputy Minister
Dam Natale 2008 Gray	Kurofune; 1998 Gray	French Deputy	Mitterand
Dam Natale 2008 Gray	Kurofune; 1998 Gray	Blue Avenue	Classic Go Go
Dam Natale 2008 Gray	Kurofune; 1998 Gray	Blue Avenue	Eliza Blue
Dam Natale 2008 Gray	Rosy Charm; 2001 Bay	Dance in the Dark	Sunday Silence
Dam Natale 2008 Gray	Rosy Charm; 2001 Bay	Dance in the Dark	Dancing Key
Dam Natale 2008 Gray	Rosy Charm; 2001 Bay	Christmas Rose	Northern Taste
Dam Natale 2008 Gray	Rosy Charm; 2001 Bay	Christmas Rose	November Rose
