= Niigata Nisai Stakes =

Niigata Nisai Stakes 新潟2歳ステークス
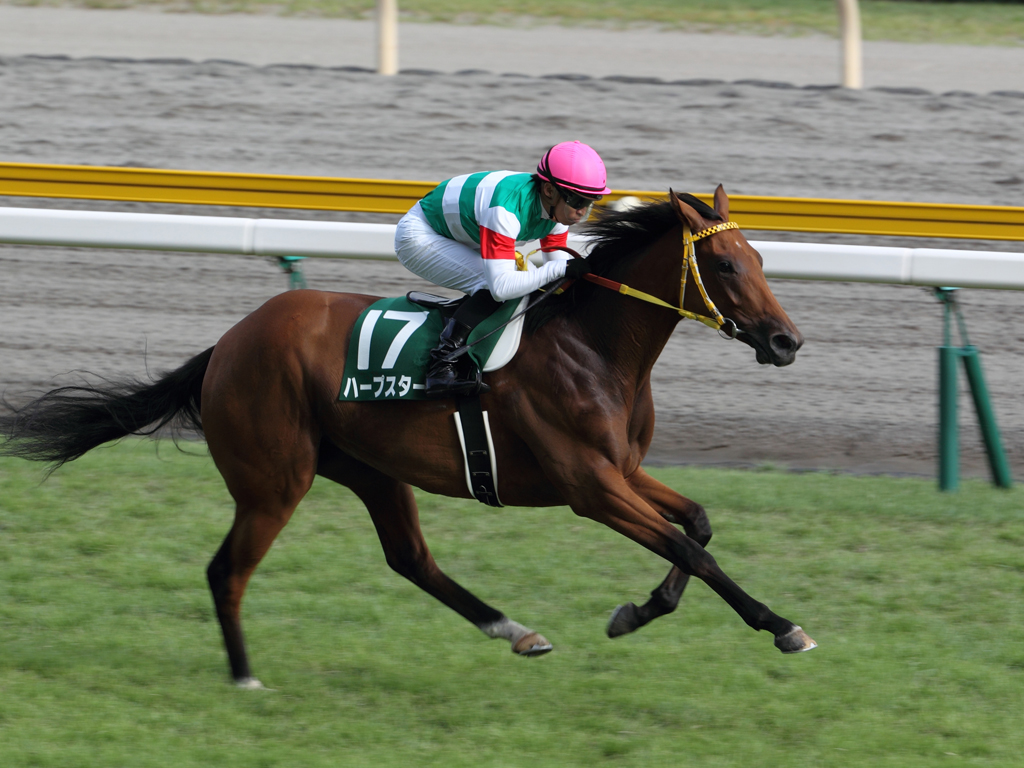
- Harp Star wins the Niigata Nisai Stakes in 2013
- Class: Grade 3
- Location: Niigata Racecourse
- Inaugurated: 1968
- Race type: Thoroughbred Flat racing

Race information
- Distance: 1600 metres
- Surface: Turf
- Track: Left-handed
- Qualification: 2-y-o
- Weight: 55 kg
- Purse: ¥ 66,860,000 (as of 2025): 1st: ¥ 31,000,000; 2nd: ¥ 12,000,000; 3rd: ¥ 8,000,000

The Niigata Nisai Stakes (Japanese 新潟2歳ステークス) is a Grade 3 horse race for two-year-old Thoroughbreds run in August over a distance of 1600 metres at Niigata Racecourse in Chūbu, Japan.

The race was first run in 1968 and was promoted to Grade 3 status in 1984. Originally run over 1200 metres the race was increased in distance to 1400 metres 1997 and to its current distance in 2002. It was run over 1200 metres at Nakayama Racecourse in 1996 and 2000.

== Winners since 2000 ==
Year	Winner	Jockey	Trainer	Owner	Time
2000	Daiwa Rouge	Hiroshi Kitamura	Hiroyuki Uehara	Daiwa Co., ltd	1:11.1
2001	Balance of Game	Hatsuhiro Kowata	Yoshitada Munakata	Hiroyuki Sonobe	1:21.7
2002	Wana	Katsuharu Tanaka	Yoshitada Munakata	Yuchi Odagiri	1:33.8
2003	Daiwa Bandit	Masayoshi Ebina	Sueo Masuzawa	Daiwa Co., ltd	1:35.0
2004	Meiner Recolte	Hiroki Goto	Masahiro Horii	Thoroughbred Club Ruffian	1:34.8
2005	Shonan Tachyon	Katsuharu Tanaka	Hiroyuki Uehara	Tetsuhide Kunimoto	1:35.0
2006	Gold Aguli	Katsumi Ando	Hirofumi Toda	Star Horsemen's Club	1:35.2
2007	F T Maia	Masayoshi Ebina	Susumu Yano	Fumio Yoshino	1:34.1
2008	Seiun Wonder	Yasunari Iwata	Masazo Ryoke	Takao Otani	1:35.4
2009	Shimmei Fuji	Yasunari Iwata	Takayuki Yasuda	Hoichi Oda	1:34.4
2010	Meine Isabel	Masami Matsuoka	Takahiro Mizuno	Thoroughbred Club Ruffian	1:34.5
2011	Monstre	Yoshitomi Shibata	Tomohito Ozeki	Koji Maeda	1:33.8
2012	Sarastro	Masami Matsuoka	Yoshinori Muto	Kazue Takahashi	1:33.5
2013	Harp Star	Yuga Kawada	Hiroyoshi Matsuda	Carrot Farm	1:34.5
2014	Musee Sultan	Yoshitomi Shibata	Satoshi Oehara	Hitoshi Takahashi	1:33.4
2015	Lord Quest	Hironobu Tanabe	Shigeyuki Kojima	Lord Horse Club	1:33.8
2016	Vous Etes Jolie	Yuichi Fukunaga	Mitsumasa Nakauchida	Shadai Race Horse	1:34.3
2017	Frontier	Yasunari Iwata	Mitsumasa Nakauchida	Sunday Racing	1:34.6
2018	Cadence Call	Shu Ihibashi	Takayuki Yasuda	Sunday Racing	1:35.5
2019	Woman's Heart	Kota Fujioka	Katsuichi Nishiura	Godolphin	1:35.0
2020	Shock Action	Keita Tosaki	Ryuji Okubo	Godolphin	1:34.6
2021	Serifos	Yuga Kawada	Mitsumasa Nakauchida	G1 Racing	1:33.8
2022	Kita Wing	Keita Tosaki	Shigeyuki Kojima	Milfarm	1:35.9
2023	Ascoli Piceno	Hiroshi Kitamura	Yoichi Kuroiwa	Sunday Racing	1:33.8
2024	Total Clarity	Yuichi Kitamura	Manabu Ikezoe	Carrot Farm	1:34.2
2025	Realize Sirius	Akihide Tsumura	Takahisa Tezuka	Yosuke Imafuku	1:33.4
2026	Lotschberg	Hironobu Tanabe	Takashi Kubota	Katsuko Muraki	1:34.7

== Earlier winners ==
- 1968 - Suiten Isuzu
- 1969 - Hida President
- 1970 - Kiyo hHaya
- 1971 - Toku Zakura
- 1972 - Bell Royal
- 1973 - Inter Jumbo
- 1974 - Gold Boy
- 1975 - Spirit Swaps
- 1976 - Tokino Katatora
- 1977 - Takeden
- 1978 - Fast Amon
- 1979 - Riki Wave
- 1980 - Kinsei Power
- 1981 - Victoria Crown
- 1982 - Steel Asa
- 1983 - Mariquita
- 1984 - Dyna Shoot
- 1985 - Dyna Acorn
- 1986 - Cool Heart
- 1987 - Green Molly
- 1988 - Meiner Mut
- 1989 - Daikatsu Ryusei
- 1990 - Big Fight
- 1991 - Uto Jane
- 1992 - Pegasus
- 1993 - Excellence Robin
- 1994 - Tosho Phenoma
- 1995 - Tayasu Da Vinci
- 1996 - Personality One
- 1997 - Courir Cyclone
- 1998 - Rosado
- 1999 - Gaily Funky

== See also ==
- Horse racing in Japan
- List of Japanese flat horse races
