= Ask Victor More =

Japanese-bred thoroughbred racehorse (2019–2023)

Ask Victor More; アスクビクターモア
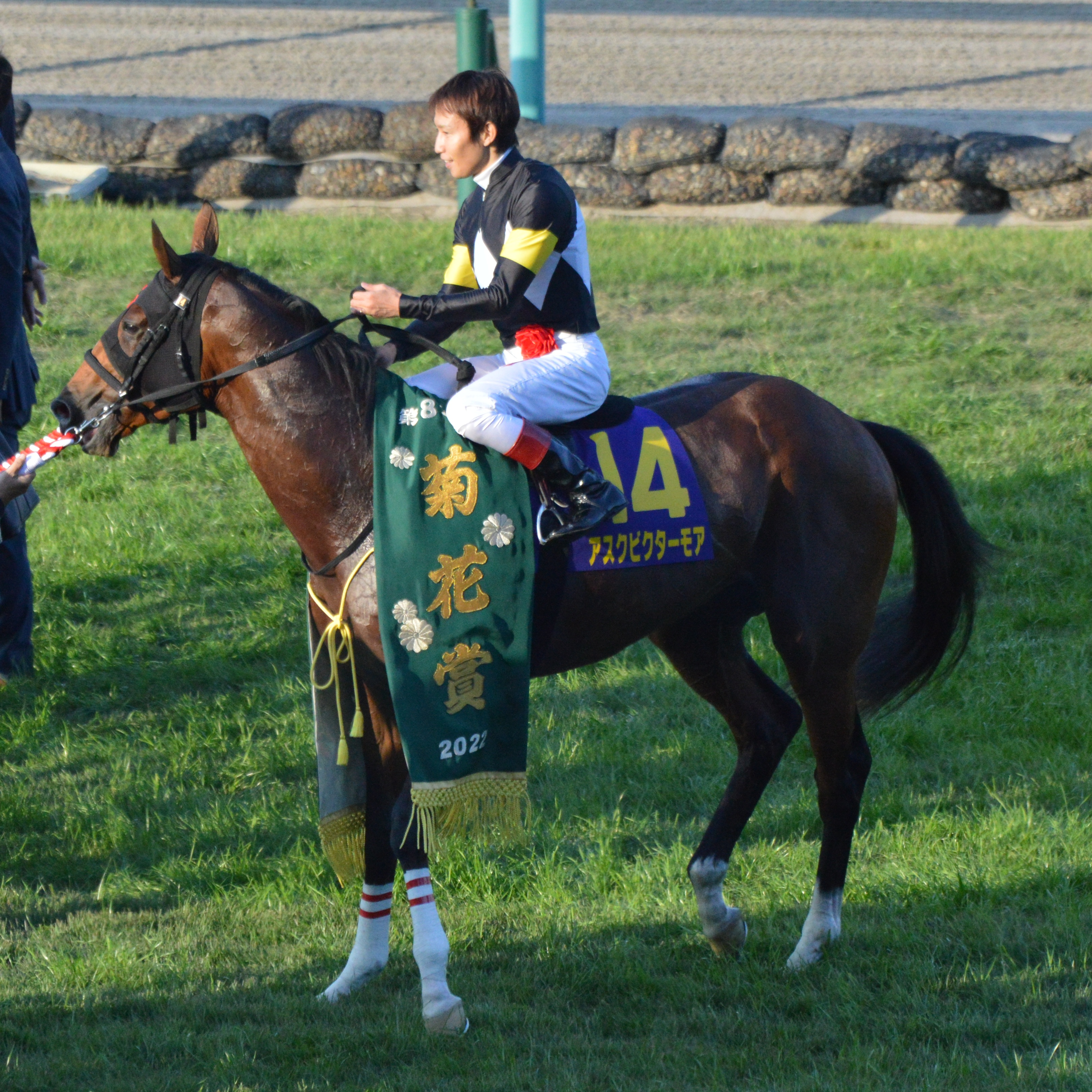
- Ask Victor More after winning the Kikuka-shō
- Breed: Thoroughbred
- Sire: Deep Impact
- Grandsire: Sunday Silence
- Dam: Kartica
- Damsire: Rainbow Quest
- Sex: colt
- Foaled: April 1, 2019
- Died: August 8, 2023 (aged 4)
- Country: Japan
- Colour: Bay
- Breeder: Shadai Farm
- Owner: Toshihiro Hirosaki HD
- Racing colours
- Trainer: Yasuhito Tamura
- Jockey: Hironobu Tanabe
- Record: 12: 4-1-3
- Earnings: ¥345,275,000

Major wins
- Yayoi Sho (2022); Japanese Classic Race wins: Kikuka-shō (2022)
- Last updated on August 31, 2023

Ask Victor More (Japanese: アスクビクターモア; April 1, 2019 – August 8, 2023) was a Japanese Thoroughbred racehorse that won the 2022 Kikuka-shō and Yayoi Sho.

== Racing career ==
=== Background ===
Ask Victor More was foaled on April 1, 2019, at the Shadai Farm in Chitose, Hokkaido. At the 2020 Yearlings Sale, the horse was purchased by Toshihiro Hirosaki for a total of 187 million yen, and became co-owned by Hirosaki and Teruya Yoshida. After training, he was sent to the stable of Yasuhito Tamura at Miho Training Center.

=== 2021: Two-year old season ===
Ask Victor More ran his first race, an 1800-meter race at Tokyo Racecourse, at a maiden race on June 26 with Keita Tosaki as his jockey. The horse was the most favored to win, but finished third behind Geoglyph, who would later win the Satsuki Shō. Ask Victor More would earn his first win at another maiden race at Nakayama Racecourse on September 20.

Ask Victor More entered the Ivy Stakes, a Listed race, the following month. The horse was once again started as the most favored to win, but ended up finishing third to future Derby winner Do Deuce.

=== 2022: Three-year-old season ===
Ask Victor More's jockey was switched to Hironobu Tanabe for his first race of the year at an allowance race, where he managed to score his second victory.

Later on, Ask Victor More entered the Yayoi Sho on March 6 with Tanabe continuing his role as the horse's jockey. Do Deuce, who had gone on to win the Asahi Hai Futurity Stakes undefeated and won the JRA Award for Best Two-Year-Old Colt since the last time the two raced together, was the most favored, while Ask Victor More himself was the third most favored. The race proceeded at a slow pace, with Ask Victor More running at second place; before the horse overtook the lead on the final stretch, and outrunning Do Deuce by a neck even as he was making his final push, marking the horse's first group race victory. As Ask Victor More was the only Deep Impact crop in that race, this win marked the 7th win by the offspring of Deep Impact in the Yayoi Sho, overtaking Sunday Silence's record of the 6 wins by its crop, as well as the 6th consecutive victory for any Deep Impact crop to enter that race.

Following his victory, the horse entered the Satsuki Shō held on April 17. The horse, who was the 6th most favored, ran from the inside, and finished 5th even as he was being pressured from Desierto. Tanabe recalled after the race that "he anticipated Desierto to take the lead, but the horse ran out of the gate so smoothly and no one was in front of them so he took the lead."

After this, the horse was entered into the Tōkyō Yūshun. He was the 7th most favoured, and the horse pursued the Desierto, who had been in the lead, and took the lead on the final 400 meters. He ended up finishing third, as both Do Deuce and Equinox had passed him soon after. Tanabe commented that "the horse would have been at a disadvantage when it came to sharpness, so I thought I had to be more proactive. I thought I had a chance since the horse still had some strength left after the final curve, but I was passed on the climb" and that "we lost, but it was productive". Ask Victor More's trainer, Yasuhito Tamura, commented "The horse ran as planned. On a regular year, he would've won the race based on the time. I have no regrets."

After taking a summer break, Ask Victor More started the autumn leg of the season with the St Lite Kinen on September 19. He started the race as the most favored, and placed himself in third. He went neck-and-neck against Gaia Force on the final stretch and briefly overtook him, but ultimately lost to Gaia Force by a head.

After the St Lite Kinen, Ask Victor More entered the final leg of the Classic races of Japan, the Kikuka-shō, a 3000-meter long race that was held at Hanshin Racecourse that year. He was the second most favored horse of that race behind Gaia Force. After starting the race, he placed himself behind Seiun Hades before taking the lead in between the 3rd and 4th corners of the second lap, and managed to stave off Boldog Hos by a nose. For both Tanabe and Tamura, it was their first Kikuka-shō win. Ask Victor More's time was 3:02.4, which broke the course record that was set by Narita Top Road at the 2001 Hanshin Daishoten by 0.1 second. The victory also marked the fifth Kikuka-shō win for any Deep Impact crop (a record for any sire) and also the 24th Classic win, the most out of any sire.

=== 2023: Four-year-old season ===
Ask Victor More took the rest of the 2022 season off, before starting off his four-year-old season off with the Nikkei Sho, before entering the Spring Tenno Sho, as was previously announced by Tamura. Tamura commented that "the horse gained 20 kilograms in weight but doesn't feel heavy at all. The head of Yamamoto (Training Center) told me he was confident with the horse's condition. I wanted to use a race that covered 2500 meters at Nakayama with the Arima Kinen in mind."

However, the horse finished at 9th at the Nikkei Sho, and 11th at the Tenno Sho. After finishing at 11th place at the Takarazuka Kinen, the horse went on a break.

It was on this break where Ask Victor More, who was preparing for the autumn season, died on August 8 due to organ failure caused by a heat stroke. He was 4.

== Racing statistics ==
The following information is based on data from JBIS Search and netkeiba.com. All races that Ask Victor More participated in were turf races.

Date	Track	Race	Grade	Distance (condition)	Entry	HN	Odds (favored)	Finish	Time	Margin	Jockey	Winner (Runner-up)
2021 – two-year-old season
Jun 26	Tokyo	Debut Race		1800m (Firm)	10	10	1.9 (1st)	3rd	1:48.5	0.3	Keita Tosaki	Geoglyph
Sep 20	Nakayama	Maiden Race		1800m (Firm)	13	10	2.3 (2nd)	1st	1:49.1	-0.2	Keita Tosaki	(Asahi)
Oct 23	Tokyo	Ivy Stakes	L	1800m (Firm)	8	2	2.2 (1st)	3rd	1:49.4	0.1	Keita Tosaki	Do Deuce
2022 – three-year-old season
Jan 5	Nakayama	3YO+ Allowance (1 win)		2000m (Firm)	9	8	1.9 (1st)	1st	2:01.9	0.0	Hironobu Tanabe	(L'Evangile)
Mar 6	Nakayama	Yayoi Sho	GII	2000m (Firm)	11	10	6.7 (3rd)	1st	2:00.5	0.0	Hironobu Tanabe	(Do Deuce)
Apr 17	Nakayama	Satsuki Shō	GI	2000m (Firm)	18	2	9.9 (6th)	5th	2:00.1	-0.4	Hironobu Tanabe	Geoglyph
May 29	Tokyo	Tōkyō Yūshun	GI	2400m (Firm)	18	3	24.7 (7th)	3rd	2:22.2	-0.3	Hironobu Tanabe	Do Deuce
Sep 19	Nakayama	St Lite Kinen	GII	2200m (Good)	13	7	2.6 (1st)	2nd	2:11.8	0.0	Hironobu Tanabe	Gaia Force
Oct 23	Hanshin	Kikuka-shō	GI	3000m (Firm)	18	14	4.1 (2nd)	1st	3:02.4	0.0	Hironobu Tanabe	(Boldog Hos)
2023 – four-year-old season
Mar 25	Nakayama	Nikkei Sho	GII	2500m (Heavy)	12	9	2.3 (1st)	9th	2:39.4	-2.6	Hironobu Tanabe	Titleholder
Apr 30	Kyoto	Tenno Sho (Spring)	GI	3200m (Good)	17	6	6.9 (4th)	11th	3:18.0	-1.9	Takeshi Yokoyama	Justin Palace
June 25	Hanshin	Takarazuka Kinen	GI	2200m (Firm)	17	12	14.3 (4th)	11th	2:12.3	-1.1	Takeshi Yokoyama	Equinox

== Pedigree ==
Pedigree of Ask Victor More
Sire Deep Impact bay 2002	Sunday Silence black bay 1986	Halo	Hail to Reason
Sire Deep Impact bay 2002	Sunday Silence black bay 1986	Halo	Cosmah
Sire Deep Impact bay 2002	Sunday Silence black bay 1986	Wishing Well	Understanding
Sire Deep Impact bay 2002	Sunday Silence black bay 1986	Wishing Well	Mountain Flower
Sire Deep Impact bay 2002	Wind in Her Hair; Bay 1991	Alzao	Lyphard
Sire Deep Impact bay 2002	Wind in Her Hair; Bay 1991	Alzao	Lady Rebecca
Sire Deep Impact bay 2002	Wind in Her Hair; Bay 1991	Burghclere	Busted
Sire Deep Impact bay 2002	Wind in Her Hair; Bay 1991	Burghclere	Highclere
Dam Kardica Bay 2007	Rainbow Quest bay 1981	Blushing Groom	Red God
Dam Kardica Bay 2007	Rainbow Quest bay 1981	Blushing Groom	Runaway Bride
Dam Kardica Bay 2007	Rainbow Quest bay 1981	I Will Follow	Herbager
Dam Kardica Bay 2007	Rainbow Quest bay 1981	I Will Follow	Where You Lead
Dam Kardica Bay 2007	Cayman Sunset chestnut 1997	Night Shift	Northern Dancer
Dam Kardica Bay 2007	Cayman Sunset chestnut 1997	Night Shift	Ciboulette
Dam Kardica Bay 2007	Cayman Sunset chestnut 1997	Robinia	Roberto
Dam Kardica Bay 2007	Cayman Sunset chestnut 1997	Robinia	Royal Graustark

- 2016 Coronation Stakes winner Qemah is a half-sister to Ask Victor More.
- Pretty Gorgeous, winner of the British Fillies' Mile, is a cousin to Ask Victor More, as she was foaled by Kartica's half-sister.
