= Ascoli Piceno (horse) =

Japanese racehorse

Ascoli Piceno アスコリピチェーノ
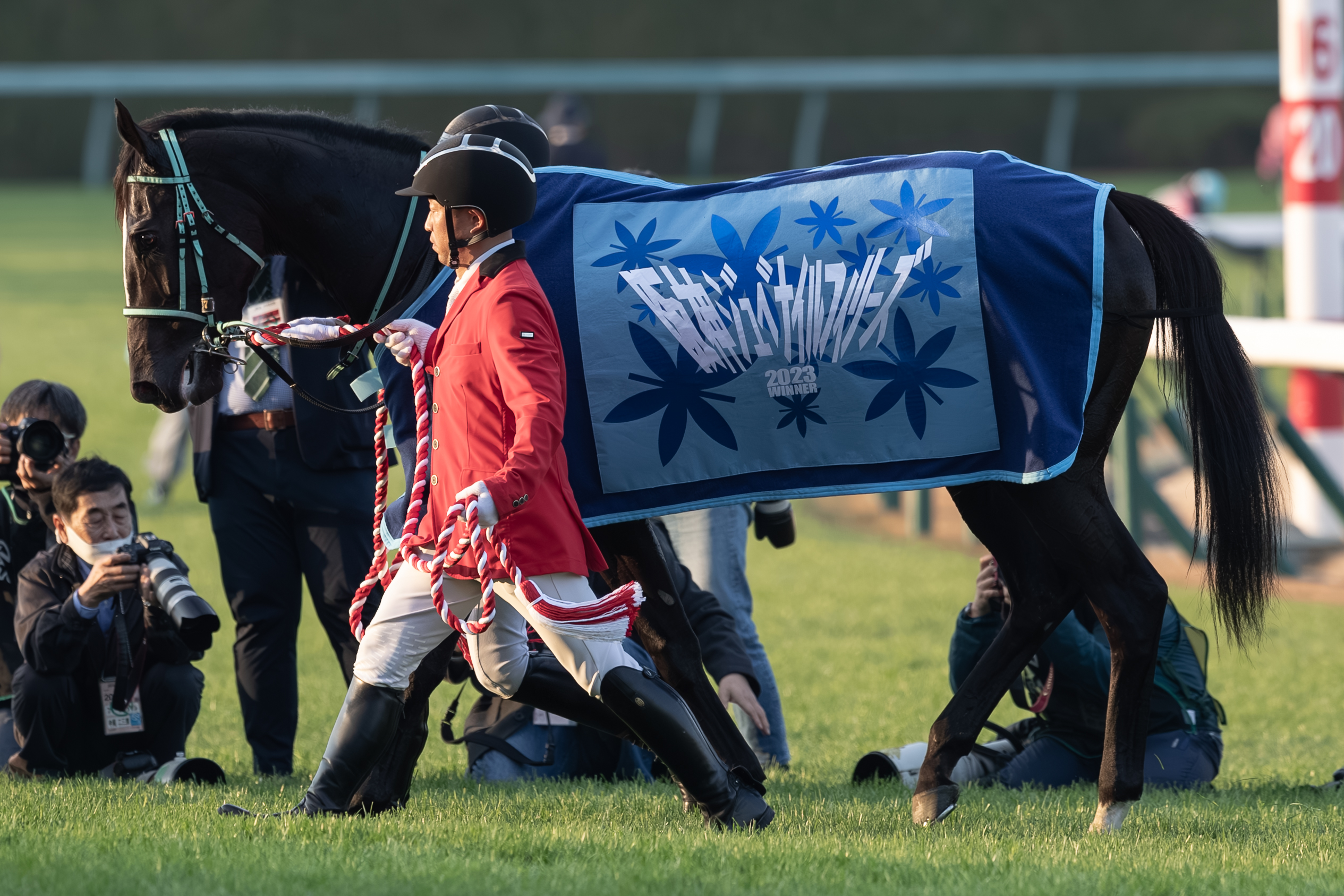
- Ascoli Piceno after winning the 2023 Hanshin Juvenile Fillies
- Sire: Daiwa Major
- Grandsire: Sunday Silence
- Dam: Ascolti
- Damsire: Danehill Dancer
- Sex: Mare
- Foaled: February 24, 2021 (age 5)
- Country: Japan
- Color: Dark Bay
- Breeder: Northern Farm
- Owner: Sunday Racing Co. Ltd.
- Racing colors
- Trainer: Yoichi Kuroiwa
- Jockey: Christophe Lemaire
- Record: 12:6-2-0
- Earnings: 588,306,500 JPY (Note: Earnings earned overseas are converted to JPY using the formula provided by JRA. 2024, 2025.); JPN: 396,995,000 JPY; AUS: 30,000 AUD; KSA: 1,200,000 USD

Major wins
- Niigata Nisai Stakes (2023); Hanshin Juvenile Fillies (2023); Keisei Hai Autumn Handicap (2024); 1351 Turf Sprint (2025); Victoria Mile (2025)

Awards
- JRA Award for Best Two-Year-Old Filly (2023)

Ascoli Piceno (Japanese: アスコリピチェーノ, Hepburn: Asukori Pichēno; Foaled February 24, 2021) is a retired Japanese Thoroughbred racehorse. She won the Hanshin Juvenile Fillies in 2023, and the Victoria Mile in 2025.

She was named after Ascoli Piceno, a city in Italy. She was awarded the JRA Award for Best Two-Year-Old Filly for 2023.

== Racing career ==
=== 2023: two-year-old season ===
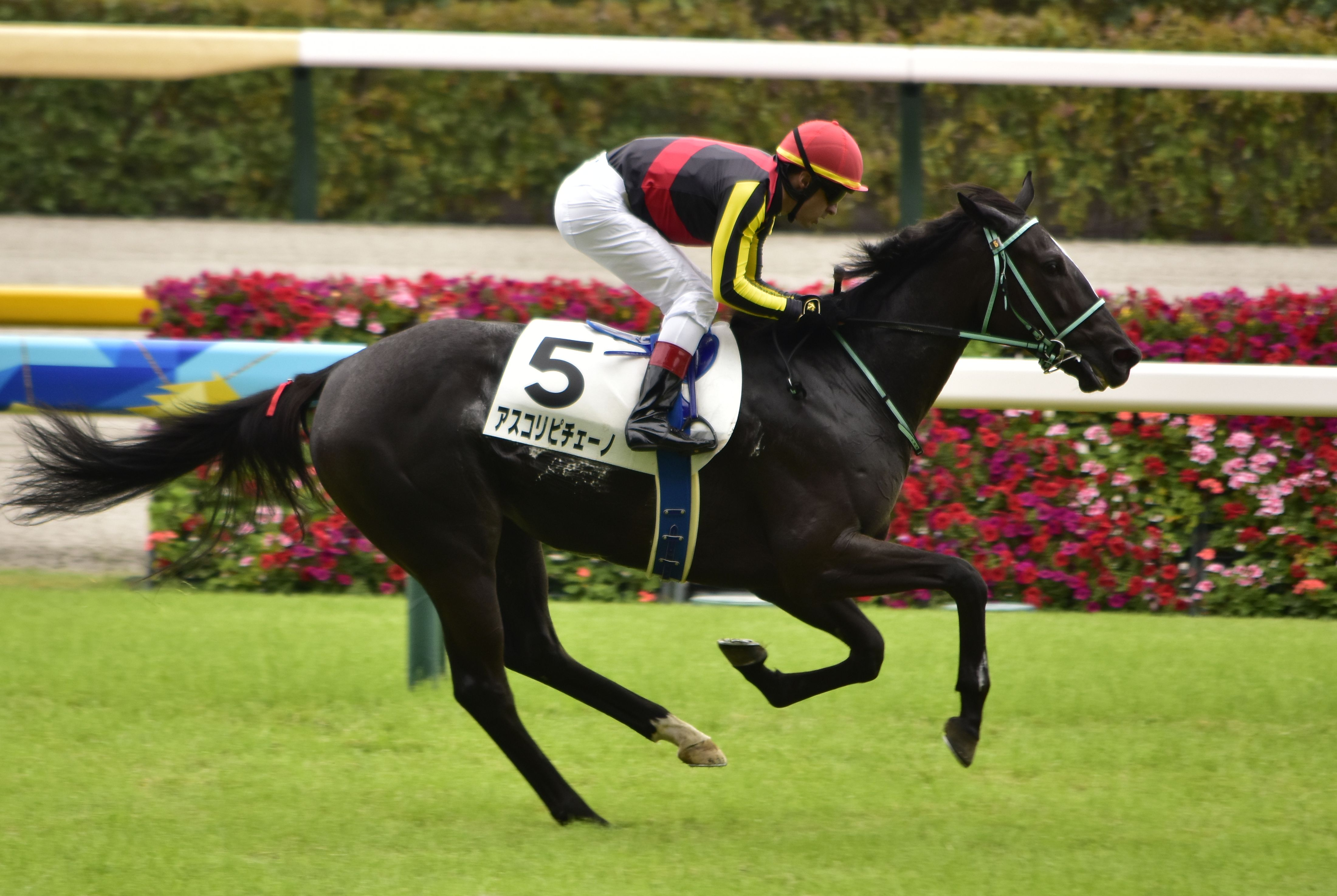
Ascoli Piceno in her debut race

Ascoli Piceno debuted at the Tokyo Racecourse on June 24, 2023, in a two-year-old newcomer race on turf at the distance of 1,400m. She was ridden by Christophe Lemaire, who let her settle at the back of the pack, then took the lead on the final straight, winning by two-and-a-half lengths. Two months later, on August 27, she raced in the Niigata Nisai Stakes for her first graded stakes race challenge. Ridden by Hiroshi Kitamura, she settled in the middle of the pack. On the final straight, she chased down the runaway horse Shonan Manuela and won by a length, successfully achieving her first graded stakes win.

For the last race of her two-year-old season, she was signed-up for the Hanshin Juvenile Fillies held at Hanshin Racecourse on December 10. This was her first grade-one stakes race. Ridden by Hiroshi Kitamura again, she settled in midfield. Entering the final straight, after passing a group of horses, she overtook Corazon Beat in the final furlong and held off the fast-finishing Stellenbosch, winning the race by a neck. She achieved her first grade-one stakes victory while breaking the race record.

=== 2024: three-year-old season ===
Ascoli Piceno started her three year old season with the first leg of the Triple Tiara, the Oka Shō. She ran in the middle of the pack, and followed Stellenbosch into the home stretch, but was never able to take her over and finished second; with the same horse that she beat at the Hanshin Juvenile Fillies handing her the first defeat of her career. She was then entered in to the NHK Mile Cup, where she was blocked by a swerving horse, and while she made her attempt to catch up to Jantar Mantar, she still lost to him by two-and-a-half lengths. On top of this, because the horse had also swerved and interfered with Captaincy and Bond Girl's paths, her jockey Lemaire was fined 30,000 yen.

After taking a four months break, Ascoli Piceno returned to racing with the Keisei Hai Autumn Handicap, which was her first race with older horses. During the race she ran among the pack and after coming in to the home stretch with a smooth turn, she surged to the top, winning her third graded race of her career. Her victory also made her the first three-year-old filly to win the race since 1985 when Erebus won the race.

On November 12, Ascoli Piceno ran her first race abroad, the Golden Eagle held at Rosehill Gardens Racecourse in Australia. Ridden by João Moreira, she ran on the outside but was unable to make gains and finished at twelfth, failing to secure a back-to-back win for a Japanese horse since Obamburumai.

=== 2025: four-year-old season ===
Ascoli Piceno started her four-year-old season in Saudi Arabia with the 1351 Turf Sprint, an under card race of the Saudi Cup Night. The horse ran third of the pack for most of the race, before contesting the lead on the final stetch and passing front-runner and fellow Japanese Win Marvel just before the wire, winning her fourth graded race.

After returning to Japan, she was then entered in to the Victoria Mile, where she would start from gate number 17, which was on the outside of the race track. She would have a poor start, but on the final stretch she would pick up speed and overtake Queen's Walk who had taken the lead earlier, before winning the race by a neck. This would mark her fifth graded race victory, her second Grade I win, and also the 11th consecutive year that Lemaire won a JRA Grade I race.

Following this race, she was sent to France to contest the Prix Jacques Le Marois. During the race she ran second along the outside rail, but was blocked by other horses towards the end, finishing sixth. She would then return to Japan to race in the Mile Championship, where she finished at seventh place.

=== 2026: five-year-old season ===
Ascoli Piceno started the season with the Hanshin Himba Stakes but finished tenth. Following this defeat, she was returned to Miho Training Center, where she went through a medical examination, where it was discovered that her left gluteal muscles were stiffeniing. A few days later, an additional examination was conducted on her pelvis, and while no problems were discovered on her pelvis, her gluteal muscle fibers were showing signs of bleeding; resulting her to be sent to pasture at the Northern Farm Tenei before going through additional examination several weeks later. In the additional examination, it was noted that there was a possibility that the horse's pelvis was fractured. Unsure of how long it would take for the horse to be able to race again, her connections announced the horse would retire from racing on May 22 to become a broodmare at Northern Farm.

== Racing statistics ==
Below data is based on data available on JBIS Search, Netkeiba, Racing Post, and Racing Australia.

Date	Track	Race	Grade	Distance (Condition)	Entry	HN	Odds (Favored)	Finish	Time	Margins	Jockey	Winner (Runner-up)
2023 – two-year-old season
Jun 24	Tokyo	2yo Newcomer		1,400 m (Firm)	16	5	1.7 (1)	1st	1:22.8	-0.4	Christophe Lemaire	(Red Senor)
Aug 27	Niigata	Niigata Nisai Stakes	3	1,600 m (Firm)	12	12	3.7 (1)	1st	1:33.8	-0.2	Hiroshi Kitamura	(Shonan Manuela)
Dec 10	Hanshin	Hanshin Juvenile Fillies	1	1,600 m (Firm)	18	7	5.9 (3)	1st	1:32.6 (Note: Set a stakes record for the event)	0.0	Hiroshi Kitamura	(Stellenbosch)
2024 – three-year-old season
Apr 7	Hanshin	Oka Sho	1	1,600 m (Firm)	18	9	3.5 (1)	2nd	1:32.3	0.1	Hiroshi Kitamura	Stellenbosch
May 5	Tokyo	NHK Mile Cup	1	1,600 m (Firm)	18	14	2.9 (1)	2nd	1:32.8	0.4	Christophe Lemaire	Jantar Mantar
Sep 8	Nakayama	Keisei Hai Autumn Handicap	3	1,600 m (Firm)	16	10	1.5 (1)	1st	1:30.8	0.2	Christophe Lemaire	(Time to Heaven)
Nov 2	Rosehill	Golden Eagle		1,500 m (Good)	20	19	3.10 (1)	12th	--	--	João Moreira	Lake Forest
2025 – four-year-old season
Feb 22	King Abdulaziz	1351 Turf Sprint	2	1,351 m (Firm)	13	3	--	1st	1:17.879	0.019	Christophe Lemaire	(Win Marvel)
May 18	Tokyo	Victoria Mile	1	1,600 m (Firm)	18	17	2.5 (1)	1st	1:32.1	0.0	Christophe Lemaire	(Queen's Walk)
Aug 17	Deauville	Prix Jacques Le Marois	1	1,600 m (Soft) (Note: Good to soft)	10	2	3.6 (1)	6th	1:34.77	0.54	Christophe Lemaire	Diego Velazquez
Nov 23	Kyoto	Mile Championship	1	1,600 m (Firm)	18	5	7.5 (3)	7th	1:31.9	0.6	Christophe Lemaire	Jantar Mantar
2026 – five-year-old season
Apr 11	Hanshin	Hanshin Himba Stakes	2	1,600 m (Firm)	10	6	3.3 (2)	10th	1:33.7	2.1	Ryusei Sakai	Embroidery

Legend:
Turf

== Pedigree ==
Pedigree of Ascoli Piceno (JPN), dark bay filly, 2021
Sire Daiwa Major ch. 2001	Sunday Silence (USA) br. 1986	Halo	Hail To Reason
Sire Daiwa Major ch. 2001	Sunday Silence (USA) br. 1986	Halo	Cosmah
Sire Daiwa Major ch. 2001	Sunday Silence (USA) br. 1986	Wishing Well	Understanding
Sire Daiwa Major ch. 2001	Sunday Silence (USA) br. 1986	Wishing Well	Mountain Flower
Sire Daiwa Major ch. 2001	Scarlet Bouquet ch. 1988	Northern Taste (CAN)	Northern Dancer
Sire Daiwa Major ch. 2001	Scarlet Bouquet ch. 1988	Northern Taste (CAN)	Lady Victoria
Sire Daiwa Major ch. 2001	Scarlet Bouquet ch. 1988	Scarlet Ink (USA)	Crimson Satan
Sire Daiwa Major ch. 2001	Scarlet Bouquet ch. 1988	Scarlet Ink (USA)	Consentida
Dam Ascolti dk. b. 2011	Danehill Dancer (IRE) b. 1993	Danehill (USA)	Danzig (horse)
Dam Ascolti dk. b. 2011	Danehill Dancer (IRE) b. 1993	Danehill (USA)	Razyana
Dam Ascolti dk. b. 2011	Danehill Dancer (IRE) b. 1993	Mira Adonde (USA)	Sharpen Up (GB)
Dam Ascolti dk. b. 2011	Danehill Dancer (IRE) b. 1993	Mira Adonde (USA)	Lettre d'Amour
Dam Ascolti dk. b. 2011	Listen (IRE) b. 2005	Sadler's Wells (USA)	Northern Dancer (CAN)
Dam Ascolti dk. b. 2011	Listen (IRE) b. 2005	Sadler's Wells (USA)	Fairy Bridge
Dam Ascolti dk. b. 2011	Listen (IRE) b. 2005	Brigid (USA)	Irish River (FR)
Dam Ascolti dk. b. 2011	Listen (IRE) b. 2005	Brigid (USA)	Luv Luvin' (Family: 9-b)

- Her grand dam from the damside won the Fillies' Mile in 2007.
- Her dam's sister Touching Speech won the Rose Stakes in 2015.
- Other close relatives include Henrythenavigator, who won four group-one races including the 2008 2000 Guineas Stakes; Magician, winner of the 2013 Irish 2,000 Guineas and Breeders' Cup Turf; and Fashionista, winner of the 2020 JBC Ladies' Classic.
