= Tatsue Ishikawa =

Japanese businessman and racehorse owner

- 石川達絵
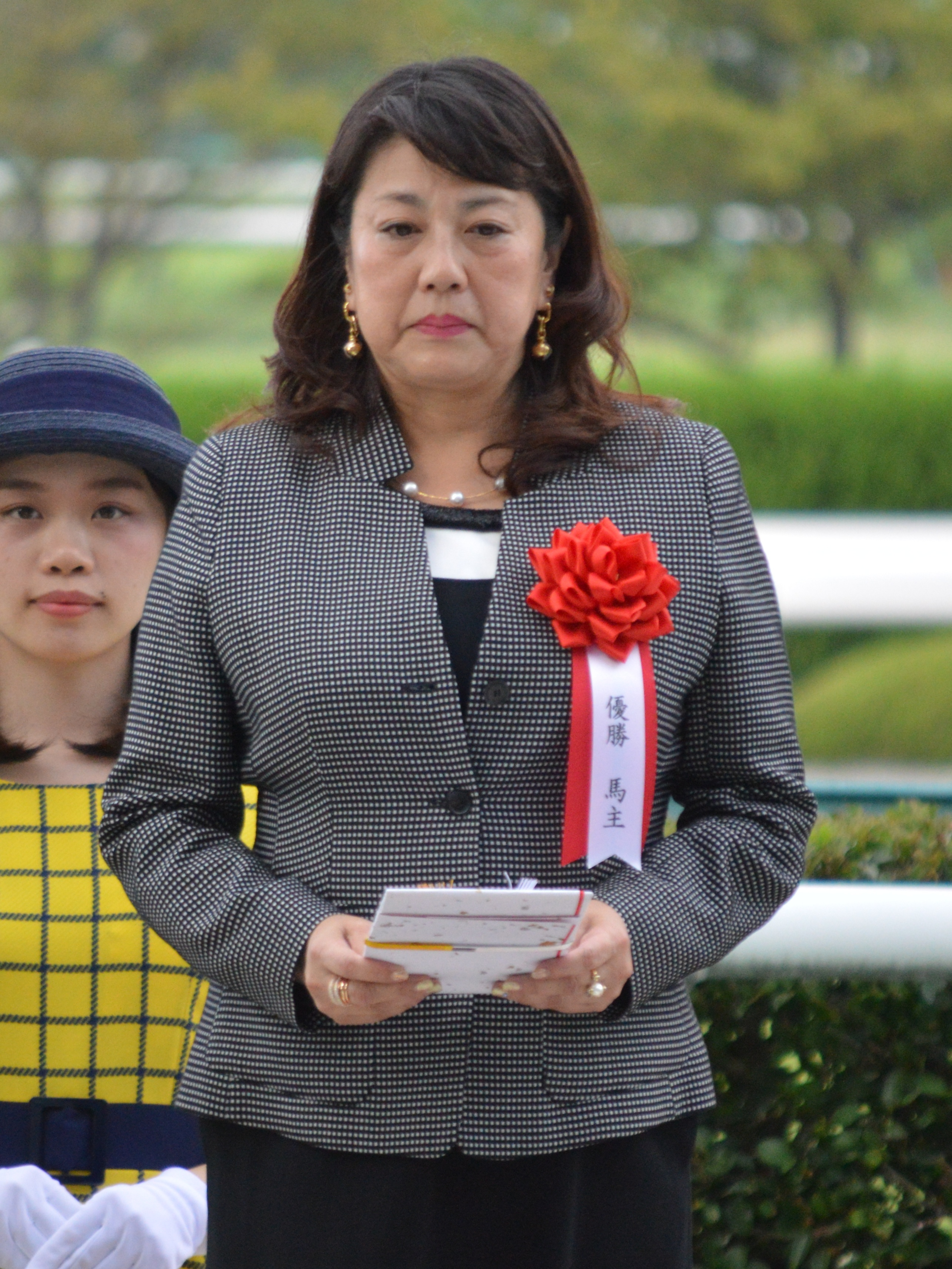
- Ishikawa in 2018 (Rose Stakes)
- Born: August 3, 1962 (age 63); Tokyo, Japan
- Known for: Businesswoman, racehorse owner

Tatsue Ishikawa (石川達絵) is a Japanese businesswoman and racehorse owner.

She is the CEO of Digimerce, a company that develops applications of smartphones and video game devices.

== Biography ==
Born in Tokyo in 1962, she founded Digimerce in 2005 after branching out of Barows.

== As a racehorse owner ==
In 2003, Ishikawa became a racehorse owner in Ohi Racecourse, before becoming a racehorse owner in the JRA in 2009.

In 2017, Ishikawa had her first graded race and Grade I win when Kiseki won the Kikuka-shō.

She does not use any particular eponyms, and her horses are often simply named. However, for what would become one of her most famous horse, Kiseki, she initially applied for various names but was rejected, before applying for "Kiseki" on a whim and being approved.

=== Significant horses ===
- Kiseki (2017 Kikuka-shō)
- Cantabile (2018 Rose Stakes, Flower Cup)
- Big Ribbon (2023 Mermaid Stakes)
- Soul Rush (2024 Mile Championship, 2025 Dubai Turf)
- Shohei (2025 Kyoto Shimbun Hai, 2026 American Jockey Club Cup)

== See also ==
- Roger Barows - Racehorse owned by Hirotsugu Inokuma, who is the CEO of Barows
