= Yomiuri Milers Cup =

Yomiuri Milers Cup マイラーズカップ
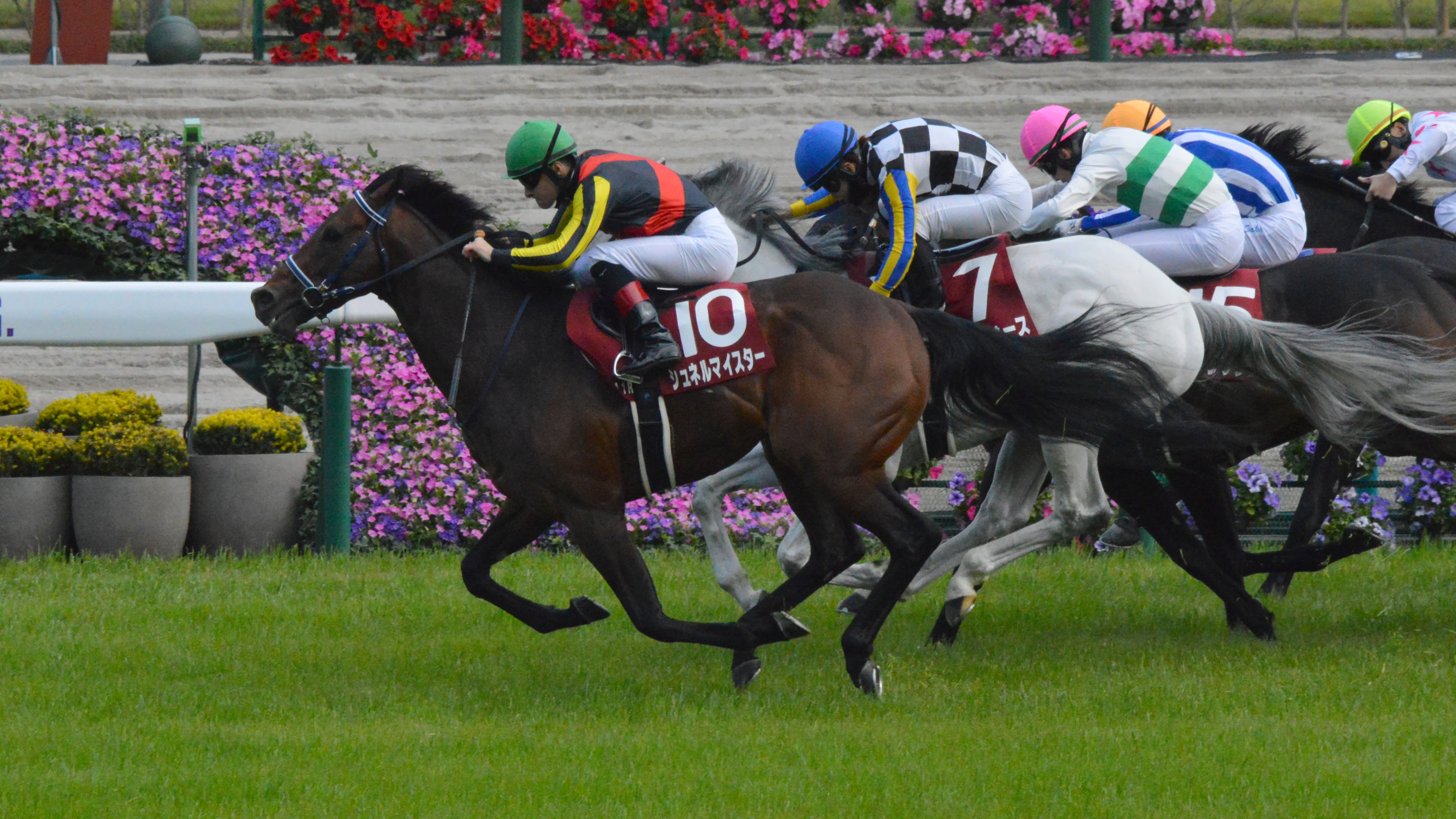
- 2023 Yomiuri Milers Cup winner Schnell Meister
- Class: Grade 2
- Location: Kyoto Racecourse
- Race type: Thoroughbred Flat racing

Race information
- Distance: 1600 metres
- Surface: Turf
- Track: Right-handed
- Qualification: 4-y-o+
- Weight: Special Weight
- Purse: ¥ 128,140,000 (as of 2024): 1st: ¥ 59,000,000; 2nd: ¥ 24,000,000; 3rd: ¥ 15,000,000

The Yomiuri Milers Cup (Japanese マイラーズカップ) is a Grade 2 flat horse race in Japan for Thoroughbreds of at least four years of age. It was run over a distance of 1600 metres at Hanshin Racecourse until 2011 in April but is now run at Kyoto Racecourse over the same distance. The race serves as a major trial for the Yasuda Kinen.

The Milers Cup was first run in 1970 and was elevated to Grade 2 status in 1984.

Among the winners of the race have been Daiwa Major, Company, Grand Prix Boss and Isla Bonita.

== Race details ==
The race is run at Kyoto Racecourse over a distance of 1,800 meters on dirt, using the outer curve.

=== Weight ===
57 kg for four-year-olds and above.
Allowances:

- 2 kg for fillies / mares
- 1 kg for southern hemisphere bred three-year-olds

Penalties (excluding two-year-old race performance):

- If a graded stakes race has been won within a year:
  - 2 kg for a grade 1 win (1 kg for fillies / mares)
  - 1 kg for a grade 2 win
- If a graded stakes race has been won for more than a year:
  - 1 kg for a grade 1 win

== Winners since 2000 ==
Year	Winner	Age	Jockey	Trainer	Owner	Time
2000	Meiner Max	6	Tetsuzo Sato	Hitoshi Nakamura	Thoroughbred Club Ruffian	1:34.3
2001	Joten Brave	4	Masayoshi Ebina	Ikuo Aizawa	Hisao Tanabe	1:32.8
2002	Millennium Bio	4	Yoshitomi Shibata	Masazo Ryoke	Bio	1:32.6
2003	Lohengrin	4	Hiroki Goto	Masanori Ito	Shadai Race Horse	1:31.9
2004	My Sole Sound	4	Masaru Honda	Katuichi Nishiura	Kiyoshi Sano	1:32.9
2005	Lohengrin	6	Norihiro Yokoyama	Masanori Ito	Shadai Race Horse	1:33.5
2006	Daiwa Major	5	Katsumi Ando	Hiroyuki Uehara	Keizo Oshiro	1:36.2
2007	Kongo Rikishio	5	Shinji Fujita	Kenji Yamauchi	Hisao Kaneoka	1:32.2
2008	Company	7	Norihiro Yokoyama	Hidetaka Otonahi	Hideko Kondo	1:33.6
2009	Super Hornet	6	Yusuke Fujioka	Yoshito Yahagi	Masamitsu Tajima	1:33.9
2010	Reach The Crown	4	Katsumi Ando	Kojiro Hashiguchi	Hiroyoshi Usuda	1:32.9
2011	Silport	6	Futoshi Komaki	Masato Nishizono	Takeo Hyakuman	1:32.3
2012	Silport	7	Futoshi Komaki	Masato Nishizono	Goichi Kawasaki	1:33.2
2013	Grand Prix Boss	5	Suguru Hamanaka	Yoshito Yahagi	Grand Prix	1:32.6
2014	World Ace	5	Andrasch Starke	Yasutoshi Ikee	Sunday Racing	1:31.4
2015	Red Arion	5	Haruhiko Kawasu	Kojiro Hashiguchi	Tokyo Horse Racing	1:32.6
2016	Kluger	4	Kohei Matsuyama	Tomokazu Takano	Carrot Farm	1:32.6
2017	Isla Bonita	6	Christophe Lemaire	Hironori Kurita	Shadai Race Horse	1:32.2
2018	Sungrazer	4	Yuichi Fukunaga	Hidekazu Asami	G1 Racing	1:31.3
2019	Danon Premium	4	Yuga Kawada	Mitsumasa Nakauchida	Danox	1:32.6
2020	Indy Champ	5	Yuichi Fukunaga	Hidetaka Otonashi	Silk Racing	1:32.4
2021^{[a]}	Cadence Call	5	Yoshihiro Furukawa	Takayuki Yasuda	Sunday Racing	1:31.4
2022^{[a]}	Soul Rush	4	Suguru Hamanaka	Yasutoshi Ikee	Tatsue Ishikawa	1:33.3
2023	Schnell Meister	5	Christophe Lemaire	Takahisa Tezuka	Sunday Racing	1:31.5
2024	Soul Rush	6	Taisei Danno	Yasutoshi Ikee	Tatsue Ishikawa	1:32.5
2025	Long Run	7	Yasunari Iwata	Yusuke Wada	Akira Umezawa	1:31.7
2026	Admire Zoom	4	Yutaka Take	Yasuo Tomomichi	Junko Kundo	1:31.7

^{a} The 2021 and 2022 runnings took place at Hanshin while Kyoto was closed for redevelopment.

== Earlier winners ==
- 1970 - Tomei
- 1971 - Tomei
- 1972 - Long One
- 1973 - Tai Tehm
- 1974 - Machikane Hachiro
- 1975 - Kitano Kachidoki
- 1976 - Silverland
- 1977 - Gold Eagle
- 1978 - Inter Gloria
- 1979 - Bambton Court
- 1980 -Nichido Arashi
- 1981 - Katsurano Haiseiko
- 1982 - Kazushige
- 1983 - Long Hien
- 1984 - Roller King
- 1985 - Nihon Pillow Winner
- 1986 - Long Hayabusa
- 1987 - Concert Master
- 1988 - Mr Boy
- 1989 - Mystic Star
- 1990 - Mejiro Worth
- 1991 - Daitaku Helios
- 1992 - Daitaku Helios
- 1993 - Nishino Flower
- 1994 - North Flight
- 1995 - Big Shori
- 1996 - Nihon Pillow Prince
- 1997 - Osumi Tycoon
- 1998 - Big Sunday
- 1999 - Egao O Misete

== See also ==
- Horse racing in Japan
- List of Japanese flat horse races
