= Jantar Mantar (horse) =

Japanese racehorse

Jantar Mantar ジャンタルマンタル
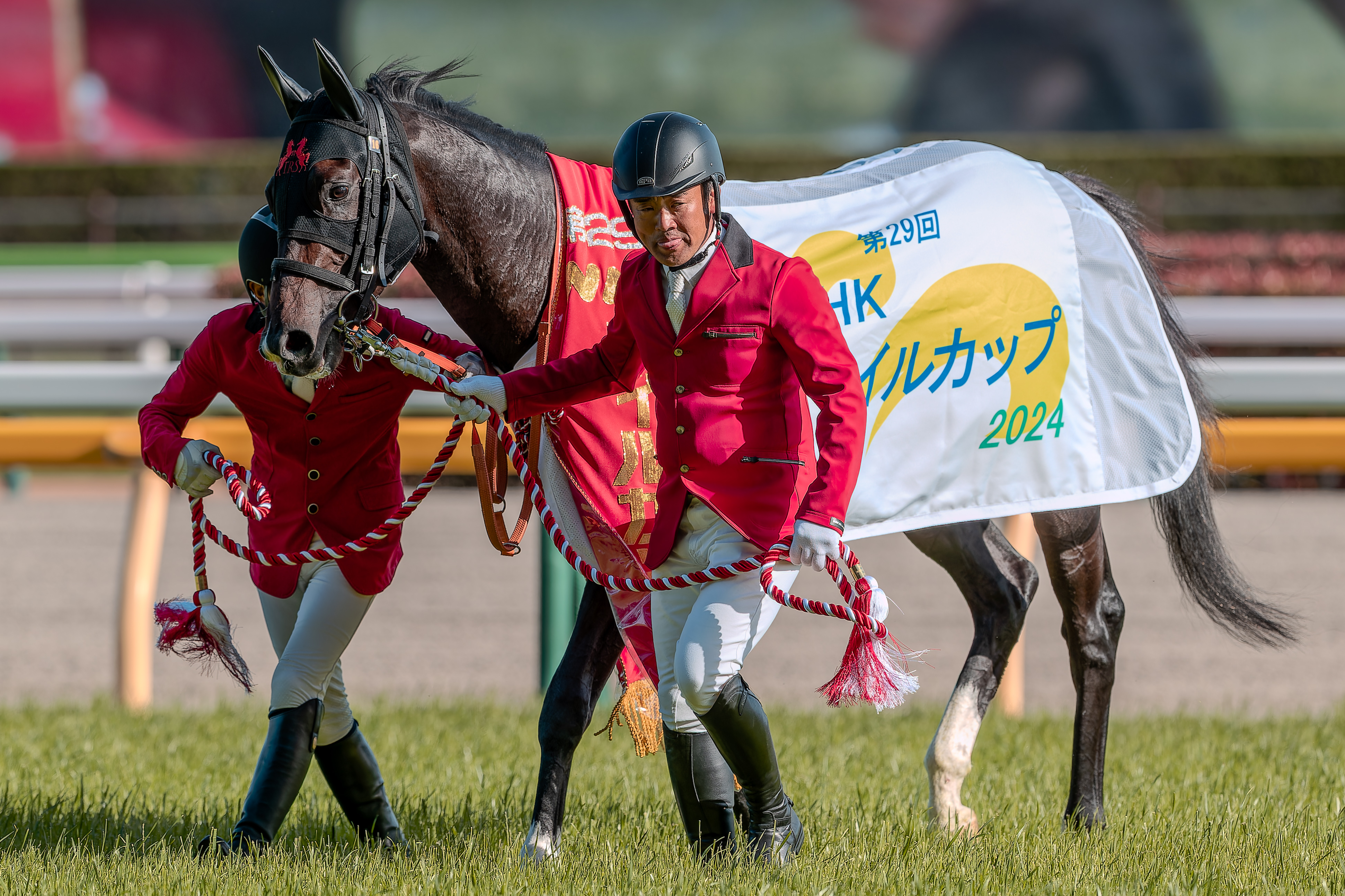
- Jantar Mantar after winning the 2024 NHK Mile Cup
- Sire: Palace Malice
- Grandsire: Curlin
- Dam: India Mantuana
- Damsire: Wilburn
- Sex: Colt
- Foaled: March 21, 2021 (age 5)
- Country: Japan
- Color: Dark Bay
- Breeder: Shadai Farm
- Owner: Shadai Race Horse Co. Ltd.
- Racing colours
- Trainer: Tomokazu Takano
- Jockey: Yuga Kawada
- Record: 11:6-2-1
- Earnings: 712,498,000 JPY

Major wins
- Daily Hai Nisai Stakes (2023); Asahi Hai Futurity Stakes (2023); NHK Mile Cup (2024); Yasuda Kinen (2025); Mile Championship (2025)

Awards
- JRA Award for Best Two-Year-Old Colt (2023); JRA Award for Best Miler (2025)
- Last updated on April 27, 2026

Jantar Mantar (Japanese: ジャンタルマンタル, foaled March 21, 2021) is a retired Japanese Thoroughbred racehorse and current stud. His major wins include the 2023 Asahi Hai Futurity Stakes, the 2024 NHK Mile Cup, and the 2025 Yasuda Kinen and Mile Championship.

He was named after the Jantar Mantar, a type of astronomical observatory in India that is designed to be used by the naked eye instead of a telescope. He was awarded the JRA Award for Best Two-Year-Old Colt for 2023 and the JRA Award for Best Miler in 2025. Jantar Mantar also holds the current speed record for the Mile Championship.

== Racing career ==
=== 2023: two-year-old season ===
Jantar Mantar debuted at the Kyoto Racecourse on October 8, 2023, in a two-year-old newcomer race on turf at a distance of 1,800 meters. Ridden by Katsuma Sameshima, he was the second favored horse. After settling in a good position from the start of the race, he broke away at the final stretch to win by two and a half horse lengths over Keep Calm.

On December 17, he made his first grade one stakes race debut at the Asahi Hai Futurity Stakes at Hanshin Racecourse. Ridden by Yuga Kawada, he was the most favored horse to win the race. Settling near the rail at the middle of the pack early on, he moved up near the front by the fourth corner as the race progressed. Then at the final straight, he quickly broke away from the pack and successfully held off the fast-finishing Ecoro Walz to win the race and clinch his first grade one win.

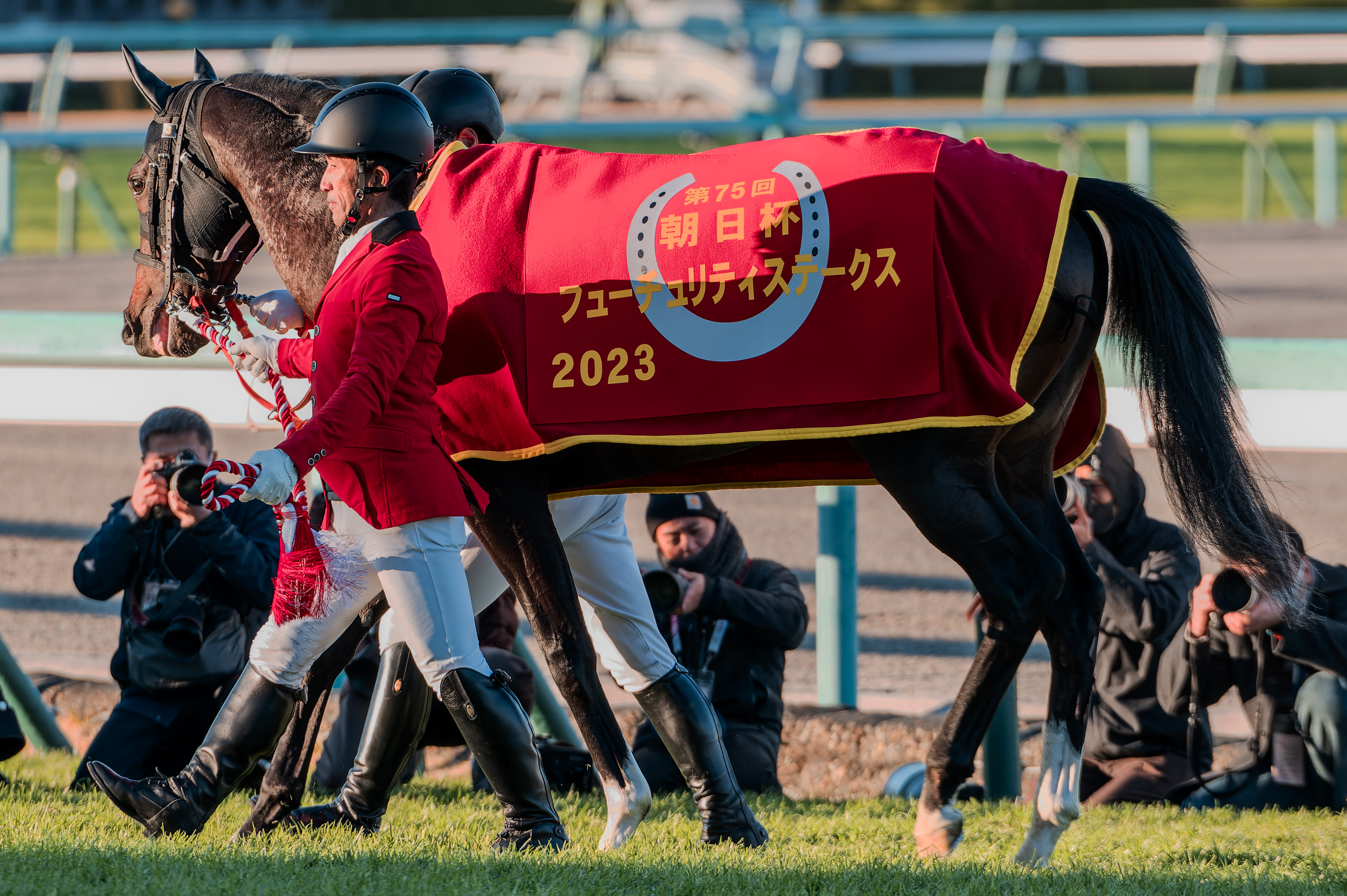
Jantar Mantar after winning the 2023 Asahi Hai Futurity Stakes

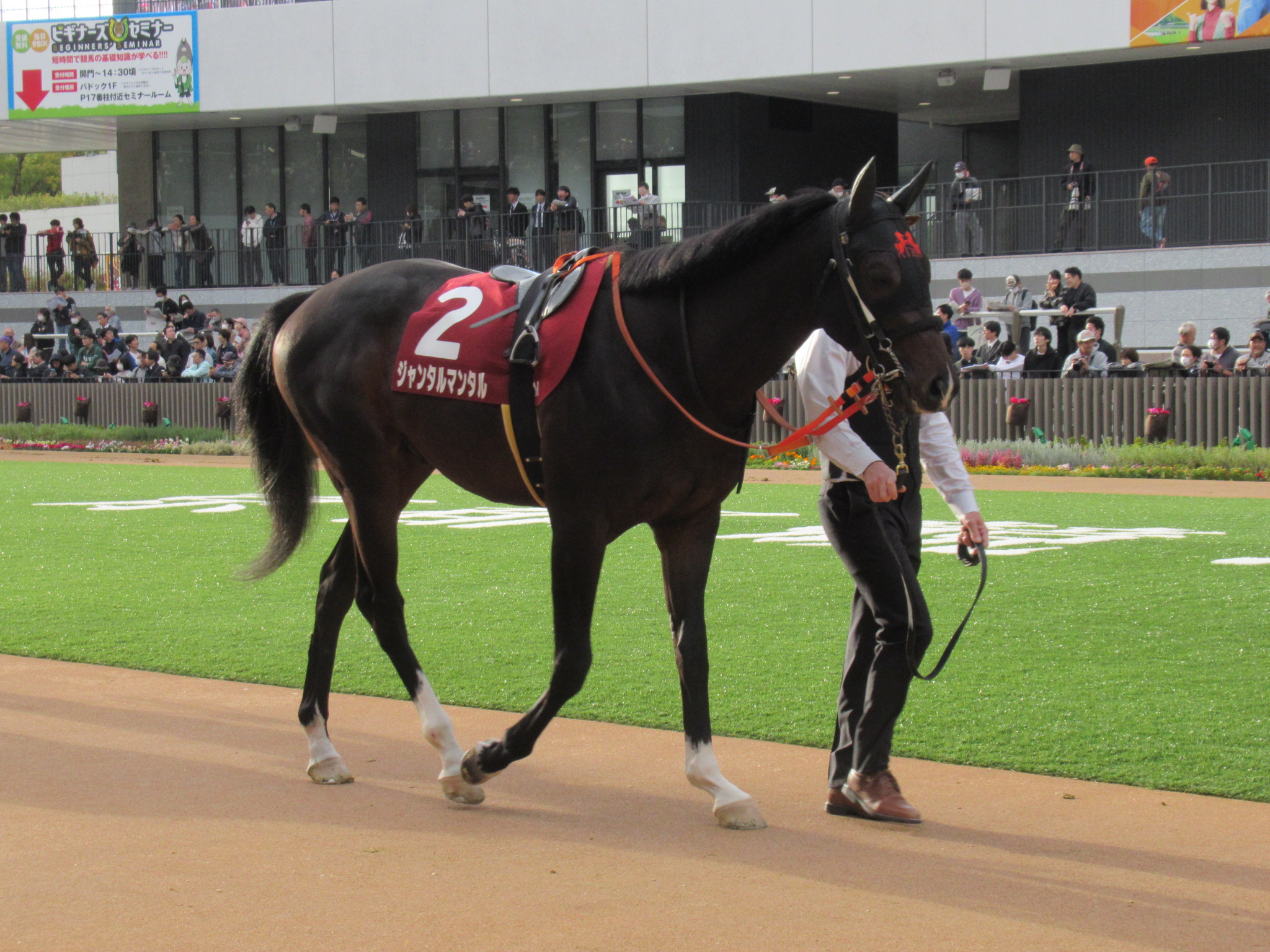
Jantar Mantar at the 2023 Daily Hai Nisai Stakes paddock

=== 2024: three-year-old season ===
Jantar Mantar first race as a three-year-old was the Kyodo Tsushin Hai, moving back up to a distance of 1,800 meters at Tokyo Racecourse. He settled in midfield throughout the race but failed to chase down Justin Milano, who moved up early, and finished in second place.

Two months later, he once again moved up in distance to race at the Satsuki Shō (Japanese 2000 Guineas) over 2,000 meters at Nakayama Racecourse. After keeping up with Meisho Tabaru, he moved up to the front early in the final stretch but was overtaken by Justin Milano and Cosmo Kuranda and ended up in third place.

Three weeks later, he dropped down in distance to a mile to race in the NHK Mile Cup at Tokyo Racecourse. He broke off well from the gates and settled in a good position up front. In the final straight, he pulled away from the pack and maintained the lead to win the race, holding off Ascoli Piceno. After the race, he was set up for Fuji Stakes but was forced to withdraw after developing a fever. He was invited to run in Hong Kong Mile next but due to a lengthy rest period and having just recovered from the fever, he ran poorly, was hit by horses on both sides during the race, and finished in 13th place.

=== 2025: four-year-old season ===
He returned to Ritto Training Center in May in order to prepare for Yasuda Kinen. During the race, Jantar Mantar was quick out of the gate and raced prominently in third behind Mad Cool. His jockey, Yuga Kawada, then started to accelerate after the 400 meter pole, and maintained a position at the front to win by one and a half lengths. This marked the first occasion where the winner of the NHK Mile Cup also won the Yasuda Kinen in the same season. His owner registered him in the Prix Jacques le Marois and Prix du Moulin de Longchamp but later cancelled the trip and prepared for the Fuji Stakes, which he had missed in 2024 due to a fever. Jantar Mantar ran well in this race but was overtaken by Gaia Force around 400 metres from the finish and placed second.

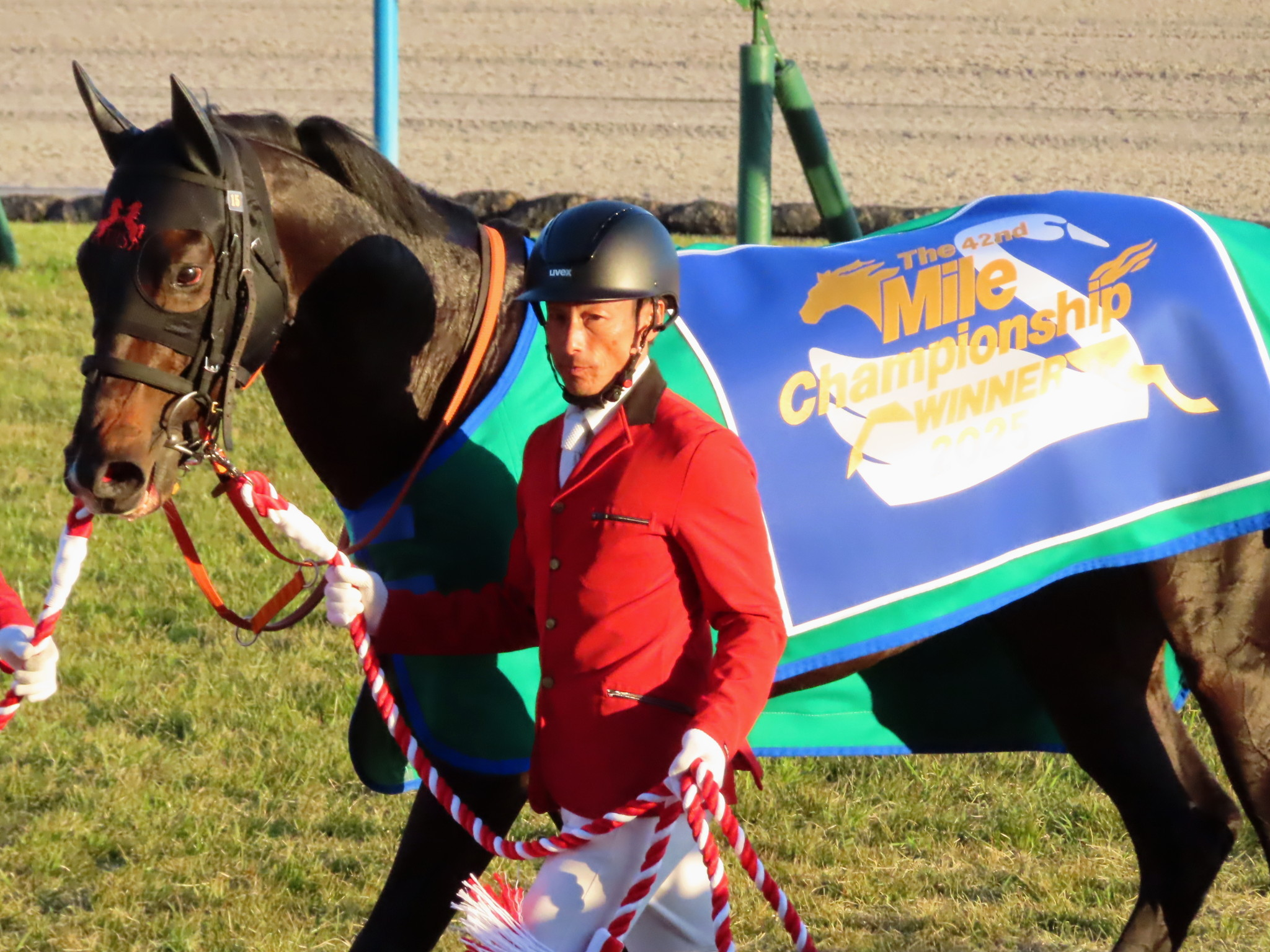
Jantar Mantar after winning the 2025 Mile Championship

This result qualified him for the second major mile race in Japan, the Mile Championship. In the race, Jantar Mantar stayed in around third as Toshin Macau ran out from the pack into the first position. As Toshin Macau began to lose speed, Jantar Mantar began to accelerate and was in the lead 300 meters away from the finish. He extended his lead and defeated the second-place Gaia Force by three-quarters of a length. He became the first horse to win all four Japanese mile races available for colts and also set a new speed record for the Mile Championship, with a finishing time of 1:31.3. He also became the ninth horse after Nihon Pillow Winner, North Flight, Taiki Shuttle, Air Jihad, Daiwa Major, Maurice, Indy Champ and Gran Alegria to win the Yasuda Kinen (spring mile race) and the Mile Championship (autumn mile race) in the same season. At the end of the 2025 racing season in Japan, he was awarded the 2025 JRA Award for Best Miler.

=== 2026: five-year-old season ===
Jantar Mantar kicked off the new season with a run at the Champions Mile. On the race day, he moved slowly from the gate in the beginning but picked up the pace and moved onto the front group. However, his strides weakened in the final straight and finished 13th. His trainer, Takano felt disappointed on his performance and hoped he shown more spirit in his running but still grateful he finished the race safely. On June 30, 2026, it was announced that Jantar Mantar would be retiring. According to his team, his physical recovery after the Champions Mile was not progressing, leading to the decision to retire him. He is now set to stand stud at Shadai Stallion Station.

== Racing statistics ==
The statistics below are based on data available on JBIS Search, and NetKeiba.

Date	Track	Race	Grade	Distance (Condition)	Entry	HN	Odds (Favored)	Finish	Time	Margins	Jockey	Winner (Runner-up)
2023 – two-year-old season
Oct 8	Kyoto	2yo Newcomer		1,800 m (Firm)	12	3	5.2 (2)	1st	1:47.4	-0.4	Katsuma Sameshima	(Keep Calm)
Nov 11	Kyoto	Daily Hai 2yo S	2	1,600 m (Good)	11	2	3.9 (1)	1st	1:34.5	-0.3	Katsuma Sameshima	(Enya Love Faith)
Dec 17	Hanshin	Asahi Hai FS	1	1,600 m (Firm)	17	3	2.7 (1)	1st	1:33.8	-0.1	Yuga Kawada	(Ecoro Walz)
2024 – three-year-old season
Feb 11	Tokyo	Kyodo Tsushin Hai	3	1,800 m (Firm)	10	9	2.5 (1)	2nd	1:48.2	0.2	Yuga Kawada	Justin Milano
Apr 14	Nakayama	Satsuki Shō	1	2,000 m (Firm)	17	8	6.1 (3)	3rd	1:57.2	0.1	Yuga Kawada	Justin Milano
May 5	Tokyo	NHK Mile Cup	1	1,600 m (Firm)	18	16	2.9 (2)	1st	1:32.4	-0.4	Yuga Kawada	(Ascoli Piceno)
Dec 8	Sha Tin	Hong Kong Mile	1	1,600 m (Good)	14	12	10.0 (4)	13th	1:34.80	1.46	Yuga Kawada	Voyage Bubble
2025 – four-year-old season
Jun 8	Tokyo	Yasuda Kinen	1	1,600 m (Firm)	18	10	4.3 (2)	1st	1:32.7	-0.2	Yuga Kawada	(Gaia Force)
Oct 18	Tokyo	Fuji Stakes	2	1,600 m (Firm)	14	14	1.9 (1)	2nd	1:31.8	0.1	Yuga Kawada	Gaia Force
Nov 23	Kyoto	Mile Championship	1	1,600 m (Firm)	18	15	1.8 (1)	1st	R1:31.3	-0.3	Yuga Kawada	(Gaia Force)
2026 – five-year-old season
Apr 26	Sha Tin	Champions Mile	1	1,600 m (Firm)	14	1	3.0 (1)	13th	1:33.99	1.62	Yuga Kawada	My Wish

Legend:
Turf

- R indicated that it was a record time.

== Pedigree ==
Pedigree of Jantar Mantar (JPN), dark bay colt, 2021
Sire Palace Malice (USA) b. 2010	Curlin ch. 2004	Smart Strike (CAN)	Mr. Prospector (USA)
Sire Palace Malice (USA) b. 2010	Curlin ch. 2004	Smart Strike (CAN)	Classy 'n Smart
Sire Palace Malice (USA) b. 2010	Curlin ch. 2004	Sherriff's Deputy	Deputy Minister (CAN)
Sire Palace Malice (USA) b. 2010	Curlin ch. 2004	Sherriff's Deputy	Barbarika
Sire Palace Malice (USA) b. 2010	Palace Rumour b. 2003	Royal Anthem	Theatrical (IRE)
Sire Palace Malice (USA) b. 2010	Palace Rumour b. 2003	Royal Anthem	In Neon
Sire Palace Malice (USA) b. 2010	Palace Rumour b. 2003	Whisperifyoudare	Red Ransom
Sire Palace Malice (USA) b. 2010	Palace Rumour b. 2003	Whisperifyoudare	Stellar Affair
Dam India Mantuana (USA) dk. b. 2014	Wilburn b. 2008	Bernardini	A.P. Indy
Dam India Mantuana (USA) dk. b. 2014	Wilburn b. 2008	Bernardini	Cara Rafaela
Dam India Mantuana (USA) dk. b. 2014	Wilburn b. 2008	Moonlight Sonata	Carson City
Dam India Mantuana (USA) dk. b. 2014	Wilburn b. 2008	Moonlight Sonata	Wheatly Way
Dam India Mantuana (USA) dk. b. 2014	Speed Wagon blk. 2003	Tomorrows Cat	Storm Cat
Dam India Mantuana (USA) dk. b. 2014	Speed Wagon blk. 2003	Tomorrows Cat	Tomorrow's Child
Dam India Mantuana (USA) dk. b. 2014	Speed Wagon blk. 2003	Rajica	El Baba
Dam India Mantuana (USA) dk. b. 2014	Speed Wagon blk. 2003	Rajica	Brassica (Family: 9-e)
