= JRA Award for Best Older Filly or Mare =

Japanese thoroughbred horse racing award

The JRA Award for Best Older Filly or Mare is a title awarded annually by the Japan Racing Association (JRA) to an outstanding horse of that category in Japanese Thoroughbred horse racing. Since 1987 the honor has been part of the JRA Awards.

== Records ==
Most successful horse (2 wins):

- Dyna Actress – 1987, 1988
- Mejiro Dober – 1998, 1999
- Vodka – 2008, 2009
- Buena Vista – 2010, 2011
- Gentildonna – 2013, 2014
- Lys Gracieux – 2018, 2019

== Winners ==
| Year | Horse | Trainer | Owner | Age |
|---|---|---|---|---|
| 1987 | Dyna Actress | Susumu Yano | Shadai Racing | 4 |
| 1988 | Dyna Actress | Susumu Yano | Shadai Racing | 5 |
| 1989 | Louisiana Pit | Yoshio Nakamura | Hidemoto Oshima | 4 |
| 1990 | Passing Shot | Mitsuru Hashida | Tadaharu Morimoto | 5 |
| 1991 | Daiichi Ruby | Yuji Ito | Haruo Tsujimoto | 4 |
| 1992 | Ikuno Dictus | Fukushima Nobuharu | Noriaki Katsuno | 5 |
| 1993 | Shinko Lovely | Kazuo Fujisawa | Osamu Yasuda | 5 |
| 1994 | North Flight | Keiji Kato | Taihoku Bokujo | 4 |
| 1995 | Hishi Amazon | Takao Nakano | Abe Masaichiro | 4 |
| 1996 | Dance Partner | Toshiaki Shirai | Katsumi Yoshida | 5 |
| 1997 | Air Groove | Yasunori Ito | Lucky Field Co Ltd | 4 |
| 1998 | Mejiro Dober | Okubo Yokichi | Mejiro Shoji Co. Ltd. | 4 |
| 1999 | Mejiro Dober | Okubo Yokichi | Mejiro Shoji Co. Ltd. | 5 |
| 2000 | Phalaenopsis | Mitsumasa Hamada | North Hills Management | 5 |
| 2001 | To the Victory | Yasuo Ikee | Makoto Kaneko | 5 |
| 2002 | Diamond Biko | Kazuo Fujisawa | Shinobu Oosako | 4 |
| 2003 | Believe | Shigeki Matsumoto | Koji Maeda | 5 |
| 2004 | Admire Groove | Mitsuru Hashida | Riichi Kondo | 4 |
| 2005 | Sweep Tosho | Akio Tsurudome | Tosho Sangyo | 4 |
| 2006 | Dance in the Mood | Kazuo Fujisawa | Shadai Racing | 5 |
| 2007 | Koiuta | Masashi Okuhira | Maekawa Kikaku | 4 |
| 2008 | Vodka | Katsuhiko Sumii | Yuzo Tanimizu | 4 |
| 2009 | Vodka | Katsuhiko Sumii | Yuzo Tanimizu | 5 |
| 2010 | Buena Vista | Hiroyoshi Matsuda | Sunday Racing | 4 |
| 2011 | Buena Vista | Hiroyoshi Matsuda | Sunday Racing | 5 |
| 2012 | Curren Chan | Takayuki Yasuda | Takashi Suzuki | 5 |
| 2013 | Gentildonna | Sei Ishizaka | Sunday Racing Co. Ltd. | 4 |
| 2014 | Gentildonna | Sei Ishizaka | Sunday Racing Co. Ltd. | 5 |
| 2015 | Shonan Pandora | Tomokazu Takano | Tetsuhide Kunimoto | 4 |
| 2016 | Marialite | Takashi Kubota | U Carrot Farm | 5 |
| 2017 | Vivlos | Yasuo Tomomichi | Kazuhiro Sasaki | 4 |
| 2018 | Lys Gracieux | Yoshito Yahagi | U Carrot Farm | 4 |
| 2019 | Lys Gracieux | Yoshito Yahagi | U Carrot Farm | 5 |
| 2020 | Almond Eye | Sakae Kunieda | Silk Racing Co | 5 |
| 2021 | Loves Only You | Yoshito Yahagi | DMM Dream Club Co., Ltd | 5 |
| 2022 | Geraldina | Takashi Saito | Sunday Racing Co. Ltd. | 4 |
| 2023 | Songline | Toru Hayashi | Sunday Racing Co. Ltd. | 5 |
| 2024 | Stunning Rose | Tomokazu Takano | Sunday Racing Co. Ltd. | 5 |
| 2025 | Regaleira | Tetsuya Kimura | Sunday Racing Co. Ltd. | 4 |
