= Seeking the Pearl =

Japanese Thoroughbred racehorse (1994-2005)

Seeking the Pearl シーキングザパール
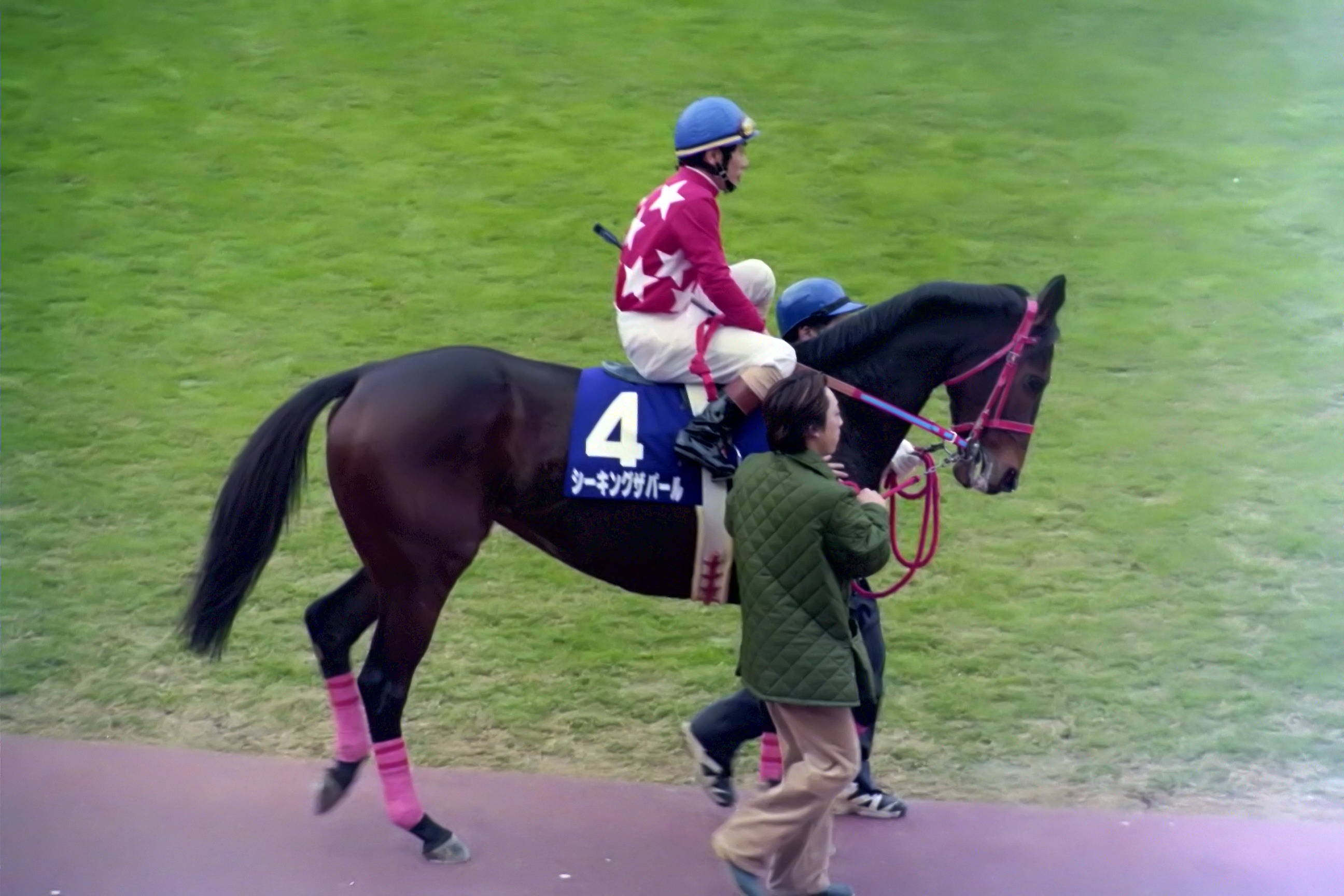
- Seeking the Pearl at the paddock during the 1998 Mile Championship.
- Breed: Thoroughbred
- Sire: Seeking the Gold
- Grandsire: Mr. Prospector
- Dam: Page Proof
- Damsire: Seattle Slew
- Sex: Mare
- Foaled: April 14, 1994
- Died: June 10, 2005 (aged 11)
- Country: United States
- Colour: Bay
- Breeder: Lazy Lane Stables
- Owner: Tomoko Uenaka →Masako Uenaka →Jayeff B Stables
- Racing colours
- Trainer: Shozo Sasaki →Hideyuki Mori →Alan E. Goldberg
- Jockey: Yutaka Take →John R. Velazquez →Mark T. Johnston
- Record: 21: 8-2-3
- Earnings: ¥487,860,000; JPN: ¥474,144,000; FR: 500,000 F USA: US$18,774

Major wins
- Daily Hai Sansai Stakes (1996); Nikkan Sports Sho Shinzan Kinen (1997); Flower Cup (1997); New Zealand Trophy Yonsai Stakes (1997); NHK Mile Cup (1997); Silk Road Stakes (1998); Prix Maurice de Gheest (1998)

Seeking the Pearl (Japanese: シーキングザパール, Hepburn: Shiikingu Za Paaru; 14 April 1994 - 10 June 2005) was an American-bred, Japanese-trained Thoroughbred racehorse and broodmare. She won the NHK Mile Cup in 1997 and the Prix Maurice de Gheest in 1998. She is the first ever Japanese-trained horse to win an overseas G1 and also the first to win a French G1.

== Background ==
Seeking the Pearl was a bay mare bred by Lazy Lane Stables, founded by American banker, publisher and philanthropist; Joe L. Allbritton in Upperville, Virginia. She was sired by Seeking the Gold, who also sired Dubai Millenium, the 1999 Prix Jacques Le Marois, and 2000 Dubai World Cup winner. Her dam, Page Proof is an American-bred mare by the 1977 American Triple Crown winner Seattle Slew.

In July 1995, she was entered into the Keeneland July Select Yearling Sale, where she was initially labeled as RNA (Reserve Not Attained), which means she went unsold. Following the auction, she was personally inspected by Masako Uenaka in her stall, where she saw the yearling poking her head outside her stall. Uenaka stated that "While most young horses look anxious, she seemed to be deep in thought. She looked very intelligent." She also described this as a "fateful encounter" which ultimately convinced her to purchase the yearling for $185,000 USD.

Before transporting her to Japan, the filly was sent to Stone Farm in Paris, Kentucky where she spent four months undergoing development. During her time in the farm, her handles noted that she was "a strong and beautiful horse."

In November 1995. she was transported to Japan and trained at Northern Farm in Hayakita, Hokkaido. In May 1996, she entered the stable of Shozo Sasaki at the Ritto Training Center in Shiga Prefecture.

Her name, Seeking the Pearl is a direct reference to her sire Seeking the Gold. The pearl in her name however came from Masako Uenaka's birthstone. Because of that, her daughter Tomoko Uenaka intended a double meaning. She interpreted the name to mean "the horse found you."

== Breeding career and death ==
After retirement, she became a broodmare at Claiborne Farm in Kentucky, and on her first season she was covered by Storm Cat and gave birth to Seeking the Dia, who won 5 graded stakes races and placed second in 9 different grade 1 races in Japan before becoming a successful sire in Chile. She would also go on to foal Dive (by Storm Cat) and Seeknfind (by Giant's Causeway) as a broodmare. Seeknfind would go on to foal Apollo Ti Amo, who won the Best Older Horse Award from Kochi Racecourse in 2023.

On June 10, 2005, Seeking the Pearl was found dead in her pasture at Lane's End Farm. The exact cause of her death was unknown but her connections said that she "showed no signs of injury or struggle, indicating her death had been sudden, perhaps caused by lightning." She was pregnant with a foal of Giant's Causeway when she died.

== In popular culture ==
An anthropomorphized version of Seeking the Pearl appears as a character in the Japanese multimedia franchise Umamusume: Pretty Derby, voiced by Ayaka Fukuhara. She is depicted as an eccentric, dauntless, and fashionable North American transfer student who views life as brimming with infinite possibilities. She developed many outstanding qualities, such as being multilingual and having a preference for foreign racing, as a result of her experiences traveling around the world since her childhood, alluding to her real-life counterpart's successes in winning overseas G1 races. The circumstances of her real-world self's death are also reflected in her character, such as her mentioning that she was nearly struck by lightning once and her poor racing performance in rainy weather and/or heavy surfaces during gameplay.

== Racing record ==
Seeking the Pearl won 8 out of 21 entries, including one overseas win. Placed second twice, and placed third thrice. This data is available is netkeiba, JBIS, IrishRacing, and Equibase.

Date	Age	Racecourse	Race	Grade	Distance; (Condition)	Entry	HN	Odds; (Favoured)	Finish	Time	Winning (Losing); Margin	Jockey	Winner (Runner-Up)
20 Jul, 1996	2	Kokura	2yo Newcomer		1200m (Firm)	8	5	1.2 (1)	1st	1:09.7	7 lengths	Yutaka Take	(Tenzan Osuzu)
1 Sep, 1996	2	Nakayama	Niigata Sansai Stakes	3	1200m (Firm)	12	12	2.3 (2)	3rd	1:10.8	(3 1/4 lengths)	Yutaka Take	Personality One
19 Oct, 1996	2	Kyoto	Daily Hai Sansai Stakes	2	1400m (Firm)	16	2	1.5 (1)	1st	1:21.3	5 lengths	Yutaka Take	(Mejiro Bright)
1 Dec, 1996	2	Hanshin	Hanshin Sansai Himba Stakes	1	1600m (Firm)	10	1	1.5 (1)	4th	1:35.3	(4 1/2 lengths)	Yutaka Take	Mejiro Dober
15 Jan, 1997	3	Kyoto	Nikkan Sports Sho Shinzan Kinen	3	1600m (Firm)	12	11	2.0 (1)	1st	1:34.6	3 lengths	Yutaka Take	(Hokko Beauty)
15 Mar, 1997	3	Nakayama	Flower Cup	3	1800m (Good)	15	6	1.7 (1)	1st	1:51.6	1 3/4 lengths	Yutaka Take	(Hokko Beauty)
20 Apr, 1997	3	Tokyo	New Zealand Trophy Yonsai Stakes	2	1400m (Firm)	18	16	1.8 (1)	1st	1:21.1	1 1/2 lengths	Yutaka Take	(Brave Tender)
11 May, 1997	3	Tokyo	NHK Mile Cup	1	1600m (Firm)	18	13	2.0 (1)	1st	1:33.1	1 3/4 lengths	Yutaka Take	(Brave Tender)
21 Sep, 1997	3	Hanshin	Kansai Telecasting Corp. Sho Rose Stakes	2	2000m (Firm)	11	7	1.4 (1)	3rd	2:01.9	(2 lengths)	Yutaka Take	Kyoei March
26 Apr, 1998	4	Kyoto	Silk Road Stakes	3	1200m (Firm)	12	1	6.5 (4)	1st	1:08.6	neck	Yutaka Take	(Masa Lucky)
24 May, 1998	4	Chukyo	Takamatsunomiya Kinen	1	1200m (Good)	16	5	2.6 (1)	4th	1:09.3	(1 1/4 lengths)	Yutaka Take	Shinko Forest
14 Jun, 1998	4	Tokyo	Yasuda Kinen	1	1600m (Heavy)	17	14	14.8 (4)	10th	1:39.2	(10 1/2 lengths)	Yutaka Take	Taiki Shuttle
9 Aug, 1998	4	Deauville	Prix Maurice de Gheest	1	1300m (Good to Firm)	12	3	9/1 (5)	1st	R1:14.70	1/2 length	Yutaka Take	(Jim and Tonic)
6 Sep, 1998	4	Longchamp	Prix du Moulin de Longchamp	1	1600m (Soft)	7	1	12/1 (5)	5th	1:43.3	(12 lengths)	Yutaka Take	Desert Prince
22 Nov, 1998	4	Kyoto	Mile Championship	1	1600m (Firm)	13	4	6.7 (2)	8th	1:34.3	(6 1/2 lengths)	Hiroshi Kawachi	Taiki Shuttle
20 Dec, 1998	4	Nakayama	Sprinters Stakes	1	1200m (Firm)	15	3	10.5 (2)	2nd	1:08.6	(head)	Yutaka Take	Meiner Love
23 Jan, 1999	5	Santa Anita	Santa Monica Handicap	1	7f (Fast)	8	7	11.40/1 (6)	4th	1:23.25	(3 lengths)	Yutaka Take	Stop Traffic
23 May, 1999	5	Chukyo	Takamatsunomiya Kinen	1	1200m (Firm)	16	2	4.5 (1)	2nd	1:08.2	(1 1/4 lengths)	Yutaka Take	Masa Lucky
13 Jun, 1999	5	Tokyo	Yasuda Kinen	1	1600m (Firm)	14	1	11.4 (3)	3rd	1:33.7	(2 1/2 lengths)	Yutaka Take	Air Jihad
2 Oct, 1999	5	Belmont Park	Noble Damsel Stakes	3	1 mile (Good)	8	4	1.60 (1)	4th	1:34.5	(5 1/2 lengths)	John R. Velazquez	Khumba Mela
17 Oct, 1999	5	Laurel Park	Laurel Dash Stakes	3	6f (Firm)	10	9	2.00 (1)	7th	1:13.8	(5 lengths)	Mark T. Johnston	Grapeshot

Legend:
Turf Dirt

- R indicated that it was a record finish time.

== Pedigree ==
Pedigree of Seeking the Pearl (USA), dark bay mare 1994
Sire Seeking the Gold (USA) 1985	Mr. Prospector (USA); 1970	Raise a Native (USA); 1961	Native Dancer (USA); 1950
Sire Seeking the Gold (USA) 1985	Mr. Prospector (USA); 1970	Raise a Native (USA); 1961	Raise You (USA); 1946
Sire Seeking the Gold (USA) 1985	Mr. Prospector (USA); 1970	Gold Digger (USA); 1962	Nashua (USA); 1952
Sire Seeking the Gold (USA) 1985	Mr. Prospector (USA); 1970	Gold Digger (USA); 1962	Sequence (USA); 1946
Sire Seeking the Gold (USA) 1985	Con Game (USA); 1974	Buckpasser (USA); 1963	Tom Fool (USA); 1949
Sire Seeking the Gold (USA) 1985	Con Game (USA); 1974	Buckpasser (USA); 1963	Busanda (USA); 1947
Sire Seeking the Gold (USA) 1985	Con Game (USA); 1974	Broadway (USA); 1959	Hasty Road (USA); 1951
Sire Seeking the Gold (USA) 1985	Con Game (USA); 1974	Broadway (USA); 1959	Flitabout (USA); 1945
Dam Page Proof (USA) 1988 F.no: 17-b	Seattle Slew (USA); 1974	Bold Reasoning (USA); 1968	Boldnesian (USA); 1963
Dam Page Proof (USA) 1988 F.no: 17-b	Seattle Slew (USA); 1974	Bold Reasoning (USA); 1968	Reason to Earn (USA); 1963
Dam Page Proof (USA) 1988 F.no: 17-b	Seattle Slew (USA); 1974	My Charmer (USA); 1969	Poker (USA); 1963
Dam Page Proof (USA) 1988 F.no: 17-b	Seattle Slew (USA); 1974	My Charmer (USA); 1969	Fair Charmer (USA); 1959
Dam Page Proof (USA) 1988 F.no: 17-b	Barb's Bold (USA); 1978	Bold Forbes (USA); 1973	Irish Castle (USA); 1967
Dam Page Proof (USA) 1988 F.no: 17-b	Barb's Bold (USA); 1978	Bold Forbes (USA); 1973	Comely Nell (USA); 1962
Dam Page Proof (USA) 1988 F.no: 17-b	Barb's Bold (USA); 1978	Goofed (USA); 1960	Court Martial (GB); 1942
Dam Page Proof (USA) 1988 F.no: 17-b	Barb's Bold (USA); 1978	Goofed (USA); 1960	Barra II (FR); 1950

- Seeking The Pearl was an inbred by 5 x 5 to Bold Ruler (Boldnesian's and Irish Castle's sire).
