= Kyoei March =

Japanese Thoroughbred racehorse

Kyoei March キョウエイマーチ
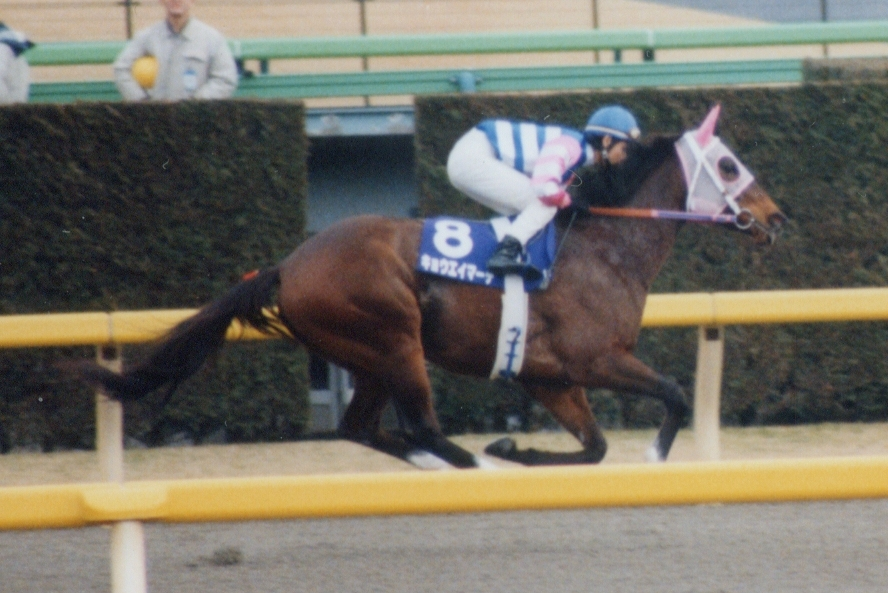
- Kyoei March racing at the 2000 February Stakes.
- Breed: Thoroughbred
- Sire: Dancing Brave (USA)
- Grandsire: Lyphard (USA)
- Dam: Inter Charmant (JPN)
- Damsire: Bravest Roman (USA)
- Sex: Mare
- Foaled: April 19, 1994
- Died: May 9, 2007 (aged 13)
- Country: Japan
- Color: Bay
- Breeder: International Stud Co. Ltd
- Owner: Tomee Matsuoka
- Racing colors: →
- Trainer: Akihiko Nomura
- Jockey: Mikio Matsunaga; Shinichiro Akiyama
- Record: 28: 8-4-3
- Earnings: ¥500.44 mil yen (JRA) ¥27.00 mil yen (NAR)

Major wins
- Hochi Hai Yonsai Himba Tokubetsu (1997); Rose Stakes (1997); Hankyu Hai (1999); Kyoto Kimpai (2000); Japanese Classic Tiara Race wins: Oka Sho (1997)

Kyoei March (Japanese: キョウエイマーチ, Hepburn: Kyōei Māchi; April 19, 1994 – May 9, 2007) was a Japanese racehorse and broodmare. She was the 1997 winner of the Oka Sho. Her other victories included the 1997 Hochi Hai Yonsai Himba Tokubetsu and Rose Stakes, the 1999 Hankyu Hai, and the 2000 Kyoto Kimpai.

== Background ==
Kyoei March was foaled on April 19, 1994, at International Ranch in Monbetsu, Hokkaido, as the second foal of Inter Charmant. Shortly after birth, it was discovered that she suffered from perichondritis, a skin condition that affected her legs, but thanks to persistent and dedicated treatment, she managed to make it to her debut. In September 1996, Kyoei March entered the Akihiko Nomura stable in Ritto Training Center.

== Racing career ==
=== 1996: three-year-old season ===
Kyoei March made her debut on November 30 in a maiden race over 1,200 meters on the dirt at Hanshin Racecourse. She won by a landslide, finishing 1.7 seconds ahead of the rest of the field. The horse that finished third in that race was Matikanefukukitaru, who would later win the Kikuka Sho. She finished third in the subsequent Senryo Sho, ending the year with a record of 1 win in 2 starts.

=== 1997: four-year-old season ===
At the start of the new year, Kyoei March won the Kambai Sho and the Elfin Stakes back-to-back and established herself as a contender for the Classics. In March, she competed in the Hochi Hai Yonsai Himba Tokubetsu, a trial race for the Oka Sho. She easily took the lead and, thanks to her superior speed, won by a landslide, setting a race record with a margin of seven lengths, the largest in the race’s history over the second-place finisher, Season Princess. Kyoei March was subsequently named the top contender for the Oka Sho.

In the Oka Sho, she was named the favorite, edging out the 2-year-old champion, Mejiro Dober. In the Oka Sho, she started from the wide No. 18 post, which is considered a disadvantage and faced several concerns, including a heavy track due to persistent rain. However, she smoothly took the lead at the fourth turn and, showing no signs of tiring in the home stretch, pulled away from the field with her superior speed to win convincingly by four lengths over second-place Mejiro Dober, claiming the Oka Sho title. Jockey Mikio Matsunaga claimed his first Oka Sho victory, while trainer Akihiko Nomura secured his first Grade I victory. For the breeder, International Farm, this also marked the first GI victory for a horse bred on their own farm.

In the subsequent Yushun Himba, Kyoei March was the favorite as the Oka Sho winner. Although she took the lead as usual, she lost speed in the home stretch and finished in 11th, as Mejiro Dober claimed the Yushun Himba title. Incidentally, Kyoei March never won another race involving long-distance transport after that; all of her victories during her racing career were at local racetracks in the Kansai region (Kyoto Racecourse and Hanshin Racecourse).

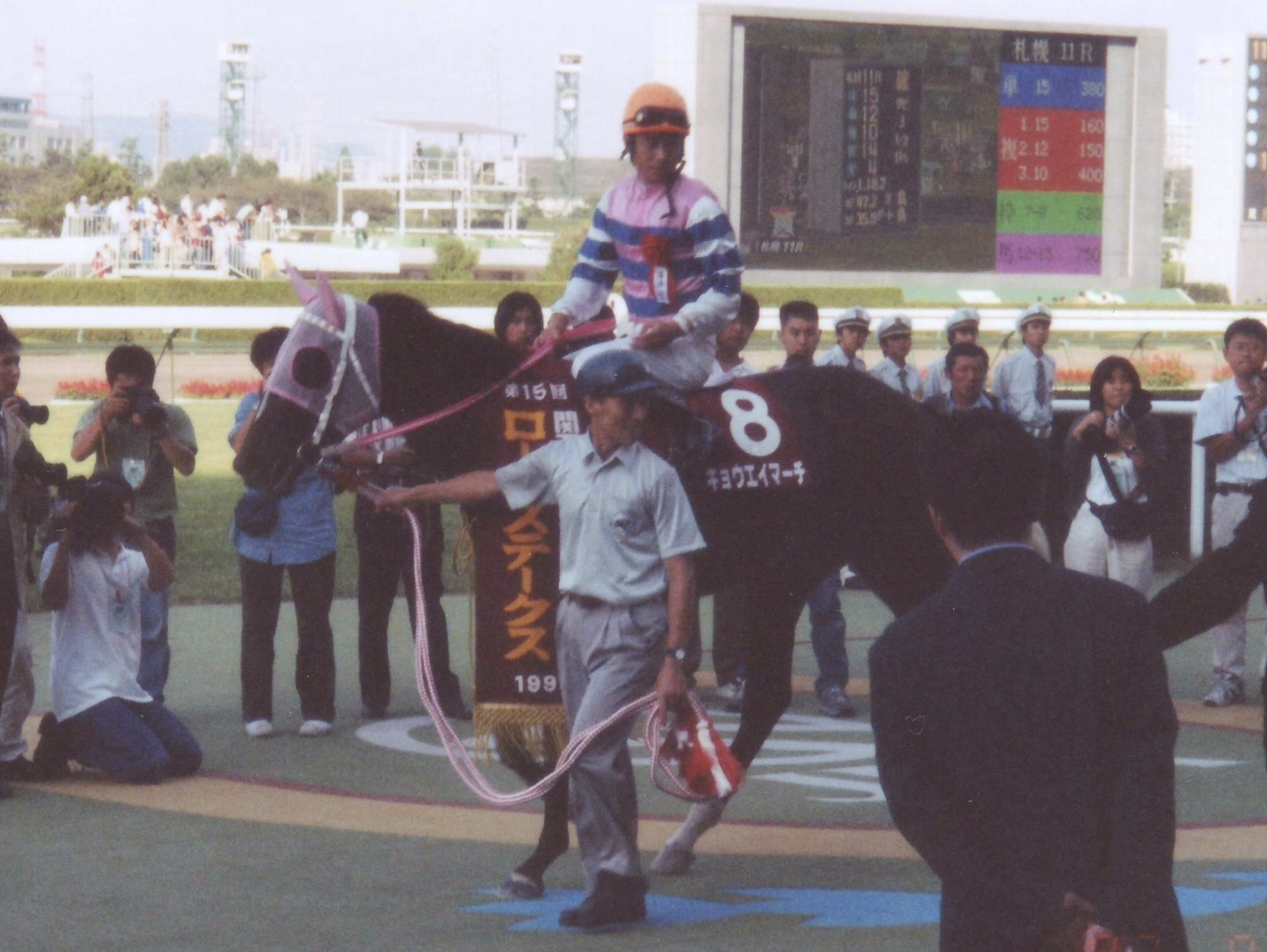
Kyoei March after winning the 1997 Rose Stakes.

In her first race of the fall, the Rose Stakes—her return from a layoff—she defeated Seeking the Pearl, who was the favorite, but in the Shuka Sho, she finished second again, beaten by Mejiro Dober. From then on, she focused almost exclusively on short-distance races, so although she was considered a rival to Mejiro Dober, this ultimately turned out to be their final showdown.

After the Shuka Sho, Kyoei March, considering her distance suitability, ran in the Mile Championship rather than the Queen Elizabeth II Cup. She won a pace battle against Silence Suzuka and held on at the front despite an astonishingly fast pace of 56.5 seconds for the first 1,000 meters, but was overtaken by Taiki Shuttle just before the finish line, finishing in second place. In the following Sprinters Stakes, she was the second favorite but suffered a crushing defeat, finishing 11th, bringing her season to a close.

=== 1998: five-year-old season ===
As she entered her older horse years, Kyoei March was unable to secure a victory, finishing third in the Yomiuri Milers Cup, 11th in the Silk Road Stakes, and sixth in the Swan Stakes. To foster the development of young jockeys, her regular jockey was changed from Matsunaga to Shinichiro Akiyama. However, even with Akiyama as her regular jockey, she finished 6th in the Mile Championship and 4th in the Hanshin Fillies’ Special, and Kyoei March was unable to secure a victory that year.

=== 1999: six-year-old season ===
Although there were rumors of retirement, Kyoei March decided to continue her racing career and took the February Stakes. In that race, she led from the start and held on until midway through the home stretch, finishing in 5th place. In her next start, the Yomiuri Milers Cup, she held on to finish 2nd, securing a place in the top two for the first time in a long while. Then, in the Hankyu Hai, she claimed her first graded stakes victory since the Rose Stakes in 1997. She finished 4th in the Takamatsunomiya Kinen, demonstrating that she could still compete in sprint races. However, in the Yasuda Kinen, she got off to a slow start and finished ninth, after which she was sent to rest.

In the fall, she returned to racing in the Nambu Hai, where she finished second. Although she finished 5th in the Mile Championship and 13th in the Sprinters Stakes, Kyoei March continued to compete in top-tier short-distance races on both turf and dirt, and in both national and regional circuits.

=== 2000: seven-year-old season ===
Kyoei March competed in the Kyoto Kimpai, which had been shortened to 1,600 meters that year. Despite carrying a de facto top handicap of 57 kg, she won convincingly, finishing 5 lengths ahead of the second-place finisher, Admire Kaiser. She and Kiss to Heaven, who won the Nakayama Fillies’ Stakes, are the only Oka Sho winners to have won a graded stakes race at age 6 (formerly 7).

Afterward, Kyoei March was unable to win, finishing 11th in the February Stakes and 3rd in the Kurofune Sho. She retired after finishing 6th in the Yomiuri Milers Cup and became a broodmare. Matsunaga remarked that, out of her 28 career starts, she was only in third place or lower at the final turn on three occasions, leaving a lasting impression of possessing speed and front-running ability unlike anything he had ever experienced before.

== Retirement ==
She had been stabled at Northern Farm Hayakita since 2001, but on May 9, 2007, she died from a colic episode during the birth of her final foal, Imperial March. She was 13 years old at the time of her death.

Although her offspring were not unattractive, many inherited the leg problems she herself had suffered from. Her second foal, Vite Vaincre, was forced to undergo surgery before reaching the age of two and ended his career winless after a total of 11 starts in both national and regional races. Her first foal, Vite Marcher, her third foal, Triumph March, and her fourth foal, Imperial March, were unable to make their debuts in two-year-old races due to physical frailty, among other factors, so there were many cases where they could not be raced smoothly. Furthermore, she was not blessed with many fillies; her first foal, Vite Marcher, is the only one carrying on the Kyoei March female line. Vite Marcher would later foal Marche Lorraine, winner of four inter-regional graded stakes races and the winner of the 2021 Breeders' Cup Distaff, as well as Badenweiler, winner of the 2022 Mercury Cup.

Furthermore, Vite Marcher’s second foal, Sambre et Meuse, entered the breeding ranks, and among her offspring, her third foal, Namur, excelled on the filly Triple Crown route with a third-place finish in the Yushun Himba and a second-place finish in the Shūka Shō; as a mature mare, she went on to win the Mile Championship. The Kyoei March female line is expanding through Vite Marcher.

In the JRA Premium Race “Hanshin Spring Premium,” held as the 12th race at Hanshin Racecourse on April 11, 2010, this horse received the most votes, leading to the race being held under the additional name “Kyoei March Memorial.”

== Racing record ==
The following racing form is based on information available on JBIS search and netkeiba.com.

Date	Age	Track	Race	Grade	Type/Distance	Field	Finish	Time	Jockey	Winner (2nd Place)
Nov 30, 1996	3	Hanshin	3YO Debut		Dirt 1200m	13	1st	1:13.4	Mikio Matsunaga	(Erimo Shiten O)
Dec 22, 1996	3	Hanshin	Senryo Sho	1W	Turf 1600m	16	3rd	1:36.7	Yoshizumi Hashimoto	Hokko Beauty
Jan 12, 1997	4	Kyoto	Kambai Sho	1W	Dirt 1400m	9	1st	1:24.9	Mikio Matsunaga	(Tagano Lapis)
Feb 16, 1997	4	Kyoto	Elfin Stakes	OP	Turf 1600m	15	1st	1:36.7	Mikio Matsunaga	(Hokko Beauty)
Mar 9, 1997	4	Hanshin	Hochi Hai Yonsai Himba Tokubetsu	G2	Turf 1400m	16	1st	1:21.4	Mikio Matsunaga	(She's Princess)
Apr 6, 1997	4	Hanshin	Oka Shō	G1	Turf 1600m	18	1st	1:36.9	Mikio Matsunaga	(Mejiro Dober)
May 25, 1997	4	Tokyo	Yushun Himba	G1	Turf 2400m	16	11th	2:31.2	Mikio Matsunaga	Mejiro Dober
Sep 21, 1997	4	Hanshin	Rose Stakes	G2	Turf 2000m	11	1st	2:01.6	Mikio Matsunaga	(Maple Syrup)
Oct 19, 1997	4	Kyoto	Shūka Shō	G1	Turf 2000m	18	2nd	2:00.5	Mikio Matsunaga	Mejiro Dober
Nov 16, 1997	4	Kyoto	Mile Championship	G1	Turf 1600m	18	2nd	1:33.7	Mikio Matsunaga	Taiki Shuttle
Dec 14, 1997	4	Nakayama	Sprinters Stakes	G1	Turf 1200m	16	11th	1:09.7	Mikio Matsunaga	Taiki Shuttle
Mar 8, 1998	5	Hanshin	Yomiuri Milers Cup	G2	Turf 1600m	11	3rd	1:34.0	Mikio Matsunaga	Big Sunday
Apr 26, 1998	5	Kyoto	Silk Road Stakes	G3	Turf 1200m	12	11th	1:09.5	Mikio Matsunaga	Seeking the Pearl
Oct 31, 1998	5	Kyoto	Swan Stakes	G2	Turf 1400m	14	6th	1:23.0	Mikio Matsunaga	Royal Suzuka
Nov 22, 1998	5	Kyoto	Mile Championship	G1	Turf 1600m	13	6th	1:34.3	Shinichiro Akiyama	Taiki Shuttle
Dec 20, 1998	5	Hanshin	Sankei Sports Hai Himba Stakes	G2	Turf 1600m	13	4th	1:35.2	Shinichiro Akiyama	Egao o Misete
Jan 31, 1999	6	Tokyo	February Stakes	G1	Dirt 1600m	16	5th	1:36.8	Shinichiro Akiyama	Meisei Opera
Mar 7, 1999	6	Hanshin	Yomiuri Milers Cup	G2	Turf 1600m	14	2nd	1:35.7	Shinichiro Akiyama	Egao o Misete
Apr 10, 1999	6	Hanshin	Hankyu Hai	G3	Turf 1200m	16	1st	1:08.6	Shinichiro Akiyama	(Broad Appeal)
May 23, 1999	6	Chukyo	Takamatsunomiya Kinen	G1	Turf 1200m	16	4th	1:08.2	Mikio Matsunaga	Masa Lucky
Jun 13, 1999	6	Tokyo	Yasuda Kinen	G1	Turf 1600m	14	9th	1:34.7	Shinichiro Akiyama	Air Jihad
Oct 11, 1999	6	Morioka	Mile Championship Nambu Hai	Jpn1	Dirt 1600m	12	2nd	1:38.9	Shinichiro Akiyama	Nihon Pillow Jupiter
Nov 21, 1999	6	Kyoto	Mile Championship	G1	Turf 1600m	18	5th	1:33.4	Shinichiro Akiyama	Air Jihad
Dec 19, 1999	6	Nakayama	Sprinters Stakes	G1	Turf 1200m	16	13th	1:09.8	Shinichiro Akiyama	Black Hawk
Jan 5, 2000	7	Kyoto	Kyoto Kimpai	G3	Turf 1600m	16	1st	1:33.4	Shinichiro Akiyama	(Admire Kaiser)
Feb 20, 2000	7	Tokyo	February Stakes	G1	Dirt 1600m	16	11th	1:36.8	Shinichiro Akiyama	Wing Arrow
Mar 21, 2000	7	Kochi	Kurofune Sho	Jpn3	Dirt 1400m	12	3rd	1:28.8	Shinichiro Akiyama	Be My Nakayama
Apr 15, 2000	7	Hanshin	Yomiuri Milers Cup	G2	Turf 1600m	18	6th	1:34.8	Shinichiro Akiyama	Meiner Max

- Jpn graded races were labelled as Listed internationally.

== Pedigree ==
Pedigree of Kyoei March (JPN)
Sire Dancing Brave	Lyphard	Northern Dancer	Nearctic
Sire Dancing Brave	Lyphard	Northern Dancer	Natalma
Sire Dancing Brave	Lyphard	Goofed	Court Martial
Sire Dancing Brave	Lyphard	Goofed	Barra
Sire Dancing Brave	Navajo Princess	Drone	Sir Gaylord
Sire Dancing Brave	Navajo Princess	Drone	Cap and Bells
Sire Dancing Brave	Navajo Princess	Olmec	Pago Pago
Sire Dancing Brave	Navajo Princess	Olmec	Chocolate Beau
Dam Inter Charmant	Bravest Roman	Never Bend	Nasrullah
Dam Inter Charmant	Bravest Roman	Never Bend	Lalun
Dam Inter Charmant	Bravest Roman	Roman Song	Roman
Dam Inter Charmant	Bravest Roman	Roman Song	Quiz Song
Dam Inter Charmant	Tokino Shrilly	Stintino	Sheshoon
Dam Inter Charmant	Tokino Shrilly	Stintino	Cynara
Dam Inter Charmant	Tokino Shrilly	Tomi Nishiki	Your Highness
Dam Inter Charmant	Tokino Shrilly	Tomi Nishiki	Suzuki Narubi
