= Mejiro Dober =

Japanese Thoroughbred racehorse

Mejiro Dober メジロドーベル
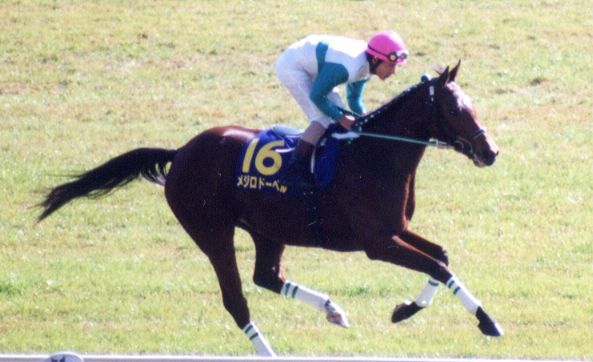
- Mejiro Dober racing at the 1997 Yushun Himba in Tokyo Racecourse.
- Breed: Thoroughbred
- Sire: Mejiro Ryan
- Grandsire: Amber Shadai
- Dam: Mejiro Beauty
- Damsire: Partholon
- Sex: Mare
- Foaled: May 6, 1994 (age 32)
- Country: Japan
- Colour: Bay
- Breeder: Mejiro Stud
- Owner: Mejiro Shouji Co Ltd
- Racing colours
- Trainer: Yokichi Okubo
- Jockey: Yutaka Yoshida
- Record: 21: 10-3-1
- Earnings: ¥733,422,000 ($4,596,096 USD)

Major wins
- Hanshin Juvenile Fillies (1996); Sankei Sho All Comers (1997); Fuchu Himba Stakes (1998); Queen Elizabeth II Cup (1998, 1999); Japanese Classic Tiara Race wins: Yushun Himba (1997); Shūka Sho (1997)

Awards
- JRA Award for Best Two-Year-Old Filly (1996); JRA Award for Best Three-Year-Old Filly (1997); JRA Award for Best Horse By Home-bred Sire (1997); JRA Award for Best Older Filly or Mare (1998, 1999)

Mejiro Dober (Japanese: メジロドーベル, Hepburn: Mejiro Dōberu; foaled May 6, 1994) is a retired Japanese Thoroughbred racehorse and broodmare. Her major victories include the Hanshin Juvenile Fillies in 1996, the Yushun Himba and the Shuka Sho in 1997, and the Queen Elizabeth II Cup in 1998 and 1999. She received the JRA Award for Best Two-Year-Old Filly, JRA Award for Best Three-Year-Old Filly, JRA Award for Best Horse By Home-bred Sire, and JRA Award for Best Older Filly or Mare consecutively in the years she raced. Yutaka Yoshida rode her in all her races, and she compiled a career record of 10 wins in 21 starts. She was the first racehorse in history to receive annual awards for four consecutive years, and her five wins in JRA Grade I races held the record for the most Grade I wins by a filly until 2009 when Vodka broke the record by achieving seven Grade I wins.

== Background ==
Mejiro Dober was foaled on May 6, 1994, at Mejiro Farm in Date, Hokkaido. Her sire, Mejiro Ryan, was the winner of the 1991 Takarazuka Kinen, and she was part of his first crop of foals. Her dam, Mejiro Beauty, was highly regarded as a promising prospect, but she retired after only two wins due to injury.

The year before, Mejiro Beauty had given birth to a colt sired by Sunday Silence; however, that colt developed severe jaundice immediately after birth and died from an infection following repeated blood transfusions, due to neonatal isoerythrolysis. As a result, a blood sample from Mejiro Beauty was sent for testing. The results revealed that Mejiro Beauty had a rare blood type that was compatible with only about 22 percent of Japanese stallions at the time. By that point, Mejiro Ryan had already mated Mejiro Beauty, and Mejiro Ryan was a stallion not compatible with Mejiro Beauty's blood type. Due to neonatal isoerythrolysis, drinking the dam's milk before developing immunity by colostrum can cause life-threatening anemia. After Mejiro Dober was born, she was given colostrum from Mejiro Roland, a one-eyed broodmare who gave birth around the same time. Following the perils at birth, she suffered a leg fracture in early 1995. It was a severe condition in which bone fragments were floating within the joint, but surgery was performed and successfully completed with the full cooperation of the veterinary staff at Shadai Stallion Station in Abira, Hokkaido.

Although Mejiro Farm had achieved great racing success in the early 1990's with horses such as Mejiro Ryan, Mejiro McQueen, and Mejiro Palmer, the farm had not been able to produce notable horses following that generation. After deliberation, Mejiro Farm decided to reform their practices including improving pasture management, grazing methods, and training facilities. Mejiro Dober and Mejiro Bright were among the first to be trained under the farm's new reforms. In February of her two-year-old season, Mejiro Dober was transferred to Tenko Farm in Fukushima Prefecture, specifically under Yoshikichi Okubo's stable, who had been in charge for caring for Dober's maternal line for a lengthy amount of time.

== Racing career ==
=== 1996: two-year-old season ===
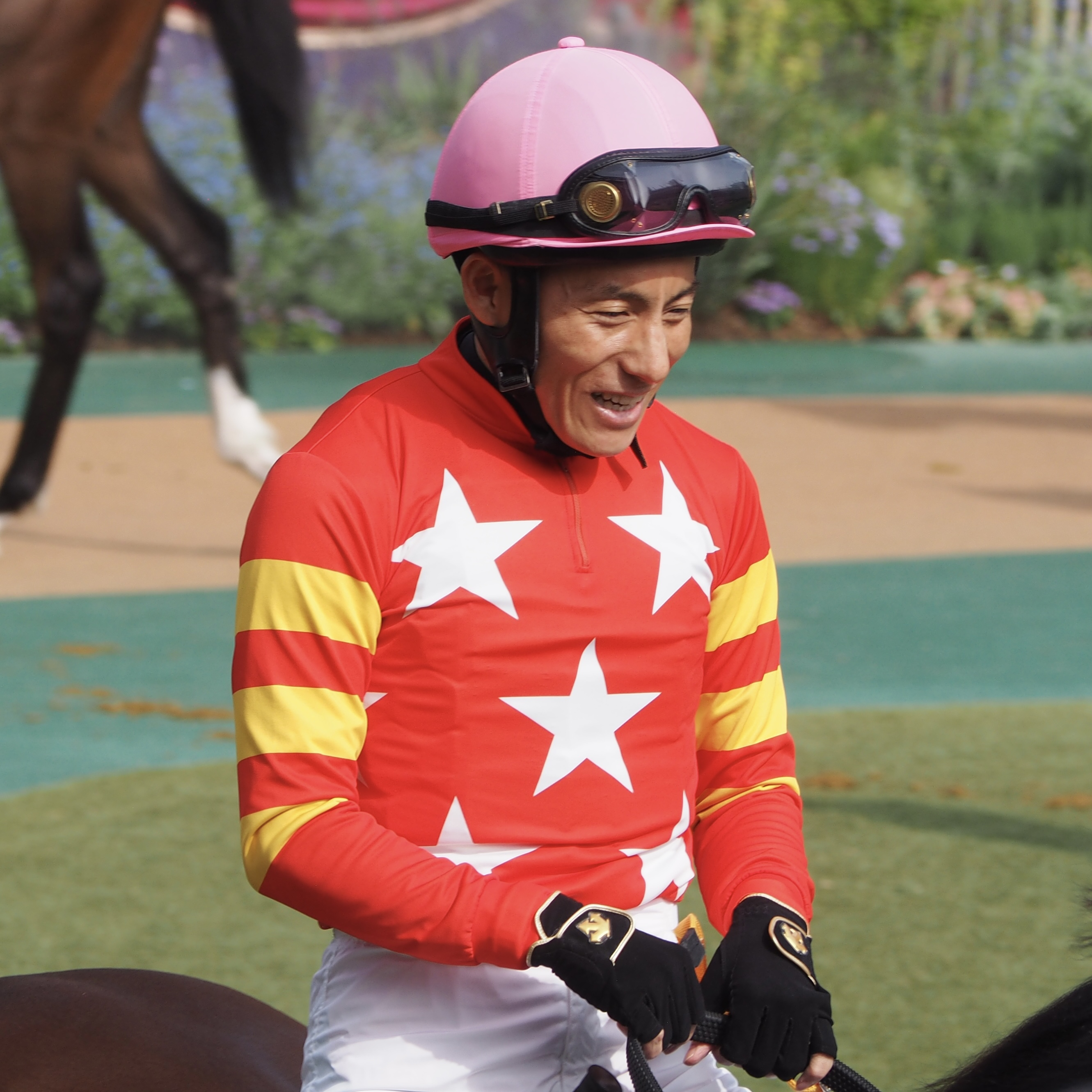
Mejiro Dober's jockey Yutaka Yoshida at the 2023 Yushun Himba.

Mejiro Dober made her debut on July 13, 1996, in a maiden race held at Niigata Racecourse. The jockey was Yutaka Yoshida, a young rider in his third year with the Okubo stable. Although she was the fourth favorite that day, Mejiro Dober broke away from the pack in the home stretch after running in a good position and claimed her first victory. In the subsequent Niigata Sansai Stakes, she made her first attempt at a graded stakes race but finished fifth after being boxed in during the race. However, she went on to win the Saffron Sho and the Ichō Stakes in succession, earning a reputation as one of the top fillies in the Kanto region even among colts.

In December, Mejiro Dober competed in the Hanshin Juvenile Fillies, the championship race for 3-year-old fillies. On the day of the race, Seeking the Pearl was the overwhelming favorite at 1.5-to-1, while Mejiro Dober was the second favorite at 5.8-to-1. The race unfolded with the field stretched out in a long line, with Seeking the Pearl in third place and Mejiro Dober in fifth. From the third turn to the final turn, Mejiro Dober moved up to the leading group; leaving Seeking the Pearl, who lacked a finishing kick, behind, she pulled away in the home stretch and won by two lengths over the second-place finisher, She's Princess. Her winning time of 1 minute 34.6 seconds set a new race record, beating the previous mark set by the 1994 winner, Yamanin Paradise, by 0.1 seconds. This was the first Grade I victory for both Yoshida and Okubo, and it marked the first victory by a Kanto-based horse in ten years, since Mejiro Ramonu.

With this victory, she concluded her season and was named the year's JRA Award for Best Two-Year-Old Filly in January of the following year. Furthermore, her sire, Mejiro Ryan, ranked second in the 3-year-old debut sire rankings. Amidst the prominent success of offspring by imported sires and foreign-bred horses, he garnered attention as a rising star among domestically bred sires.

=== 1997: three-year-old season ===
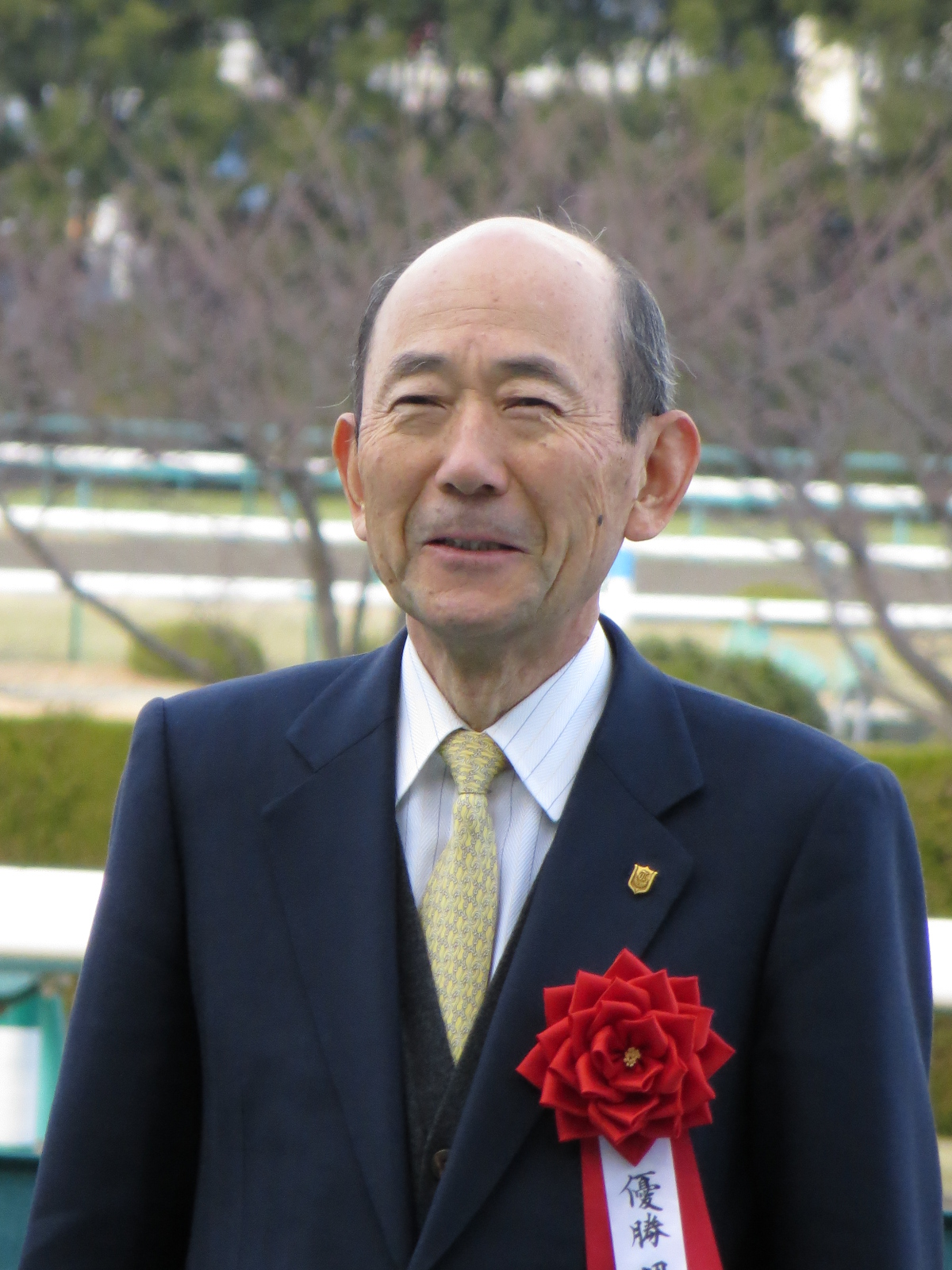
Mejiro Dober's trainer Yokichi Okubo in 2012

In 1997, Mejiro Dober began her campaign in March with the Tulip Sho, in preparation for the Oka Sho, the first leg of the Triple Tiara. She was the favorite at 1.3-to-1 odds, but during the race, she could not handle the slow pace; defying jockey Yoshida's attempts to rein her in, she ran with her head held high and finished third. In an interview conducted before the race, Okubo remarked, "This mare's bloodline tends to be a bit too spirited—she has a tendency to want to run—so the biggest challenge will be how she responds when the pace slows down." The Oka Sho was held on April 6 and due to rain was run on a heavy track. Kyoei March, who had won four of her five career starts was the 2.6-to-1 favorite, while Mejiro Dober was the 3.4-to-1 second favorite. While Kyoei March took the lead early, Mejiro Dober raced from the back of the pack. Mejiro Dober moved up from the final turn and made a strong push down the home stretch, but Kyoei March, who had pulled away early, finished 4 lengths ahead, leaving Mejiro Dober in second place.

On May 25, in the Yushun Himba, the second leg of the Triple Tiara, Kyoei March and Mejiro Dober were the favorites, with the former at 2.2-to-1 as the top choice and the latter at 2.9-to-1 as the second favorite. Regarding the distance of 2,400 meters—800 meters longer than the Oka Sho—while Mejiro Dober was considered to have no concerns in terms of pedigree, there was the question of whether she could maintain harmony with jockey Yoshida given her temperament. In front of a crowd of 150,000 spectators, Mejiro Dober—who was kept wearing a blindfold until just before the start—appeared extremely calm, unlike during the Oka Sho when she had been somewhat restless. When the race began, Kyoei March surged to the front as if pushed forward, while Mejiro Dober, just as in her previous race, settled into a position at the rear and ran in perfect harmony with Yoshida throughout the race. In the final straight, she burst forward from the center of the track and won by two and a half lengths over the second-place finisher, Nana Yo Wing. Kyoei March lost speed rapidly over the final 300 meters and finished 11th. Mejiro Dober's great-grandmother, Mejiro Bosatsu, had been trained by Okubo's father, Sueyoshi, and had finished second in the 1966 Oaks; for those familiar with that era, this victory served as redemption for that defeat. Okubo said, "Up until the fourth turn, she was in perfect rhythm—I'd give that a 95 out of 100—so I was confident she'd pick up speed in the home stretch. In the Oka Sho, she lost ground by taking the outside route, so even though we lost, I believed we were the stronger horse." Yoshida added, "I was certain we had won by the middle of the home stretch. Since she's the Champion Three-Year-Old, to be honest, I felt a sense of relief. This proved that our loss in the Oka Sho was solely due to the course loss."

After a summer break, the fall target became the Shuka Sho, the final leg of the Fillies' Triple Crown. Leading up to that race, Mejiro Dober, Kyoei March, and Seeking the Pearl—who, though a foreign-bred horse and therefore ineligible for the Oka Sho and Oaks, had won the G1 NHK Mile Cup—were regarded as the "Big Three". For her first race of the fall, Okubo, taking into account the time between that race and the main event, selected the Sankei Sho All Comers, where she would face older colts. While this race typically attracted top contenders looking ahead to the Tenno Sho (Autumn), that year's field was relatively weak, with Abukuma Polo, regarded as the leading contender. Consequently, Mejiro Dober was backed as the favorite at 2.1-to-1 odds. During the race, just as in the Tulip Sho, she struggled to settle with jockey Yoshida; however, when Yoshida refrained from forcing Mejiro Dober back and let her take the lead, he regained his composure and held on to win by leading from start to finish.

On October 19, in the Shuka Sho, Seeking the Pearl was absent due to a tracheal condition, and the race was viewed as a showdown between the two top contenders, Mejiro Dober and Kyoei March, who had each won their respective preliminary races. On race day, Mejiro Dober's odds stood at 1.7, making her the favorite for the first time, ahead of Kyoei March. In the race, Kyoei March ran in second place while Mejiro Dober settled in the middle of the pack; in the final straight, Mejiro Dober caught Kyoei March—who had taken the lead—with 100 meters to go and won by two and a half lengths, thus becoming a Double Tiara winner. Nobumichi Iwasaki, General Affairs Director at Mejiro Farm, who attended the race on behalf of the farm, commented, "I think it was a fantastic Grade I race where the two horses, who had also competed in the spring, clashed head-to-head in a battle of strength." After this race, Kyoei March shifted to a short-distance racing career between 1200 to 1600 metres, making this their final head-to-head matchup.

At the end of the year, in a fan vote to select entrants for the Arima Kinen Grand Prix, she received 132,690 votes, placing third behind Air Groove and Bubble Gum Fellow (who did not run). On race day, despite being a 4-year-old filly, she was the third favorite behind Marvelous Sunday and Air Groove. In the race, she ran from the middle to the back of the pack, moved up to the leading group at the final turn, but failed to gain momentum in the home stretch and finished eighth behind Silk Justice. In that year's annual awards, she won two categories: JRA Award for Best Three-Year-Old Filly and JRA Award for Best Horse By Home-bred Sire. Meanwhile, Air Groove who won the Tenno Sho (Autumn), finished second in the Japan Cup, and placed third in the Arima Kinen was selected as Horse of the Year, marking the first time in 26 years that a filly had received the honor.

=== 1998: four-year-old season ===
In 1998, Mejiro Dober began her spring campaign with the Nikkei Shinshun Hai where she finished in 8th place. In April, she participated in the Sankei Osaka Hai in where she faced Air Groove. On race day, Air Groove was the overwhelming favorite at 1.2-to-1 odds, while Mejiro Dober was the third favorite. The race unfolded at a slow pace which she struggled with, and she also suffered the misfortune of losing her path in the home stretch, but she still finished second, just three-quarters of a length behind Air Groove. However, she finished fifth in both the subsequent Meguro Kinen and Takarazuka Kinen and Mejiro Dober was sent to rest.

After training at Hakodate Racecourse, Mejiro Dober began his fall campaign with the Fuchu Himba Stakes. Carrying 58 kilograms, she was pushed to the wire by Grace Admire, who finished just a nose behind, but secured her first victory since the Shuka Sho. His next race was the Queen Elizabeth II Cup on November 15. Air Groove, who had skipped the Tenno Sho (Autumn), was entered in this race; her camp had publicly stated that it was a "stepping stone to the Japan Cup". On race day, she was the favorite at odds of 1.4 to 1, while Mejiro Dober was the second favorite at 4.6 to 1. When the race began, Mejiro Dober raised her head during the slow-paced first half, once again failing to settle with jockey Yoshida. However, she soon settled down, broke away along the inside rail from the final turn, and finished a length and a quarter ahead of second-place finisher Run for the Dream and three-quarters of a length ahead of Air Groove, becoming the first filly in history to win her fourth Grade I race. Her final three furlongs (the last 600 meters) were clocked at 33.5 seconds, an extraordinary time for that era. Although she defeated Air Groove in their fourth head-to-head matchup, it was the first time in two years and one month that Air Groove had been beaten by a filly.

Her primary goal that fall was the Queen Elizabeth II Cup, but at the end of the year, she was selected to run in the Arima Kinen for the second consecutive year after finishing third in the fan vote. However, she failed to settle with jockey Yoshida and finished ninth without putting on a show. Incidentally, Air Groove, who finished fifth in that race, retired after this performance. At the annual awards ceremony that year, Mejiro Dober was named recipient of the JRA Award for Best Older Filly or Mare, edging out Air Groove and Seeking the Pearl, who had won the Prix Maurice de Geste in France, becoming the first Japanese-trained horse to win a European G1 race.

=== 1999: five-year-old season ===
Mejiro's Dober's final season, 1999, began with the Nakayama Fillies' Stakes. Although the field was considered a walk in the park for Mejiro Dober, she was defeated by Naritaru Na Park the ninth favorite, who carried a 5.5-kilogram weight advantage—marking the first time since the Oaks that she had been beaten by a filly other than Air Groove. Furthermore, she subsequently sustained an injury to the left side of her hindquarters, forcing her to take her first extended break from racing. She made her comeback in the Mainichi Okan in the fall but finished sixth there as well. However, she regained her form in the lead-up to the Queen Elizabeth II Cup her primary goal for the fall and by race day, she was in even better condition than the previous year.

On November 14, she competed in the Queen Elizabeth II Cup aiming for a repeat victory. The previous year's double-tiara filly, Phalaenopsis, was the favorite, with Mejiro Dober as the second favorite and the previous year's Oaks winner, Erimo Excel, as the third favorite, creating an atmosphere of a "big three" showdown. The race unfolded at a slow pace, with the three favorites running side by side on the backstretch. However, starting at the 600-meter mark, both Phalaenopsis and Erimo Excel were unable to maintain a smooth run due to contact with other horses. Mejiro Dober broke away and held off the charging Fusaichi Airedale by three-quarters of a length to take first place, achieving the first back-to-back victory in the race's history. She extended her own record for G1 victories by a filly to "5", placing her in a tie for second place overall with Narita Brian, behind only Symboli Rudolf's seven wins. As of 2024, her five G1 victories in fillies-only races tie her with Apapane for the all-time record. Furthermore, her four consecutive GI victories tied her with Mejiro McQueen, owned by the same owner, for first place in that category. Yoshida commented, "Last year, I was strongly focused on defeating Air Groove, but this time I was in the position of being the one being chased. Given the pressure that came with that, this is a truly joyful victory." Owner Toshio Kitano added, "She put on the best possible race, fitting for her final outing. I think she surpassed Mejiro Ramonu in this race as well", he remarked.

Although a start in the Arima Kinen had been considered prior to the race, Mejiro Dober retired after this victory, having ended her career on a high note. On November 21, a retirement ceremony was held at Tokyo Racecourse, where she made her final public appearance wearing the No. 16 race number she had worn when she won the Oaks. On December 3, she headed to, Mejiro Farm, to begin her breeding career. In that year's annual awards, she was selected as the recipient of the JRA Award for Best Older Filly or Mare for the second consecutive year. She became the first horse in the history of Central Racing to receive annual awards for four consecutive years. Furthermore, in the "Great Poll for the Greatest Horses of the 20th Century" organized by the Japan Racing Association in 2000, she was ranked 19th, and her name was also included in the "Top 100 Horses of the 20th Century" list published in the JRA's public relations magazine, Yushun.

== Retirement ==
=== Breeding career ===
As a broodmare, Mejiro Dober was bred to numerous top stallions, including Sunday Silence and his successors, but none of her direct offspring went on to achieve notable success. Her sixth foal, Mejiro Daibosatsu, a son of the 2005 Triple Crown winner Deep Impact generated much buzz and high expectations as the "12-Crown Baby" alongside Mejiro Dober’s five Grade I victories, but ultimately finished with a record of one win in 16 starts.

c = colt, f = filly

No.	Name	Foaled	Sex	Color	Sire	Races	Wins	Remarks
1st	Mejiro Hilary	2001	f	Bay	El Condor Pasa			Did not run, broodmare
2nd	Mejiro Lourdes	2002	f	Liver chestnut	Sunday Silence			Did not run, broodmare
3rd	Mejiro Allegretto	2003	f	Bay	Agnes Tachyon	6	0	Deceased
4th	Mejiro Charade	2006	f	Bay	Manhattan Cafe	2	1	Broodmare
5th	Mejiro Audrey	2007	f	Bay	Special Week	14	2	Broodmare
6th	Mejiro Daibosatsu	2008	c	Bay	Deep Impact	16	1	Riding horse, broodsire
7th	Reine de Briller	2012	f	Chestnut	Zenno Rob Roy	30	4	Broodmare
8th	Ho O Dream	2014	c	Bay	Rulership	18	4	Retired, lead horse
9th	(unnamed)	2015	f	Bay	King Kamehameha			
10th	Pinscher	2016	c	Bay	Rulership	15	1	Retired, broodsire

=== Lake Villa Farm ===
In April 2011, Mejiro Farm decided to dissolve due to poor financial performance. The horses, including Mejiro Dober, were transferred to Lake Villa Farm—a new operation established by Nobumichi Iwasaki, the managing director of Mejiro Farm, who took over the facilities—where they continued to be stabled. Nobumichi and his son Yoshihisa Iwasaki, who had worked tirelessly to launch the farm, expressed their aspirations, stating, “We want to prove that it’s not the horses’ fault that Dober’s bloodline isn’t producing winners. And we want to rebuild the Mejiro brand from the ground up.” In May 2014, Shonan Lagoon—a son of Mejiro Charade, the fourth foal out of Mejiro Dober—won the Aoba Sho, marking the first graded stakes victory for a descendant of Mejiro Dober and the first such victory for a horse bred by Lake Villa Farm. The horse was trained by Yokichi Okubo, who was set to retire the following February, and Okubo said through tears, "This is the victory that makes me happiest." This also marked Okubo’s final graded stakes victory.

In 2016, she was retired from breeding and has since served as a lead horse, guiding herds of weaned yearlings. As of June 2026, following the death of Taiki Fortune in February 2025, she is the oldest living JRA flat Grade I winner.

== In popular culture ==
An anthropomorphized version of Mejiro Dober appears as a character in the Japanese multimedia franchise Umamusume: Pretty Derby, voiced by Hikari Kubota. She is depicted as a reticent, sheltered girl and a closeted otaku and shōjo manga artist. She is also the only trainee in the mobile game to have different interactions with the player trainer depending on their chosen gender, being friendly and confident around female trainers, while she exhibits some androphobia and extreme shyness around male trainers. However, she gradually develops a deeper bond towards the player trainer as she develops trust in their abilities, regardless of gender.

== Racing record ==
Date	Age	Track	Name	Grade	Distance (Condition)	Field	Finished	Time	Jockey	Winner (2nd Place)
Jul 13, 1996	2	Niigata	2YO debut		1000m (Firm)	4	1st	0:58.2	Yutaka Yoshida	(Central Heidi)
Sep 1, 1996	2	Nakayama	Niigata Sansai Stakes	3	1200m (Firm)	5	5th	1:11.4	Yutaka Yoshida	Personality One
Oct 6, 1996	2	Tokyo	Saffron Sho	ALW	1400m (Firm)	2	1st	1:23.5	Yutaka Yoshida	(Daiwa Angela)
Oct 27, 1996	2	Tokyo	Icho Stakes	OP	1600m (Firm)	7	1st	1:35.0	Yutaka Yoshida	(Sky Baron)
Dec 1, 1996	2	Hanshin	Hanshin Juvenile Fillies	1	1600m (Firm)	6	1st	1:34.6	Yutaka Yoshida	(She's Princess)
Mar 1, 1997	3	Hanshin	Tulip Sho	3	1600m (Good)	6	3rd	1:38.1	Yutaka Yoshida	Orange Peel
Apr 6, 1997	3	Hanshin	Oka Sho	1	1600m (Heavy)	16	2nd	1:37.6	Yutaka Yoshida	Kyoei March
May 25, 1997	3	Tokyo	Yushun Himba	1	2400m (Soft)	16	1st	2:27.7	Yutaka Yoshida	(Nanayo Wing)
Sep 14, 1997	3	Nakayama	Sankei Sho All Comers	2	2200m (Firm)	6	1st	2:16.6	Yutaka Yoshida	(Yashima Sovereign)
Oct 19, 1997	3	Kyoto	Shūka Sho	1	2000m (Firm)	10	1st	2:00.1	Yutaka Yoshida	(Kyoei March)
Dec 21, 1997	3	Nakayama	Arima Kinen	1	2500m (Firm)	15	8th	2:36.0	Yutaka Yoshida	Silk Justice
Jan 25, 1998	4	Kyoto	Nikkei Shinshun Hai	2	2400m (Firm)	11	8th	2:27.3	Yutaka Yoshida	Erimo Dandy
Apr 5, 1998	4	Hanshin	Sankei Ōsaka Hai	2	2000m (Firm)	4	2nd	2:01.4	Yutaka Yoshida	Air Groove
Jun 13, 1998	4	Tokyo	Meguro Kinen	2	2500m (Soft)	6	5th	2:35.8	Yutaka Yoshida	Going Suzuka
Jul 12, 1998	4	Hanshin	Takarazuka Kinen	1	2200m (Firm)	3	5th	2:12.4	Yutaka Yoshida	Silence Suzuka
Oct 18, 1998	4	Tokyo	Fuchu Himba Stakes	3	1800m (Soft)	10	1st	1:49.3	Yutaka Yoshida	(Grace Admire)
Nov 15, 1998	4	Kyoto	Queen Elizabeth II Cup	1	2200m (Firm)	1	1st	2:12.8	Yutaka Yoshida	(Run for the Dream)
Dec 27, 1998	4	Nakayama	Arima Kinen	1	2500m (Firm)	14	9th	2:33.2	Yutaka Yoshida	Grass Wonder
Feb 28, 1999	5	Nakayama	Nakayama Himba Stakes	3	1800m (Firm)	11	2nd	1:48.7	Yutaka Yoshida	Narita Luna Park
Oct 10, 1999	5	Tokyo	Mainichi Ōkan	2	1800m (Firm)	1	6th	1:46.4	Yutaka Yoshida	Grass Wonder
Nov 14, 1999	5	Kyoto	Queen Elizabeth II Cup	1	2200m (Firm)	6	1st	2:13.5	Yutaka Yoshida	(Fusaichi Airedale)

== Pedigree ==
Pedigree of Mejiro Dober
Sire Mejiro Ryan	Amber Shadai	Northern Taste	Northern Dancer
Sire Mejiro Ryan	Amber Shadai	Northern Taste	Lady Victoria
Sire Mejiro Ryan	Amber Shadai	Clear Amber	Ambiopoise
Sire Mejiro Ryan	Amber Shadai	Clear Amber	One Clear Call
Sire Mejiro Ryan	Mejiro Chaser	Mejiro Samman	Charlottesville
Sire Mejiro Ryan	Mejiro Chaser	Mejiro Samman	Paradisea
Sire Mejiro Ryan	Mejiro Chaser	Cheryl	Snob
Sire Mejiro Ryan	Mejiro Chaser	Cheryl	Chanel
Dam Mejiro Beauty	Partholon	Milesian	My Babu
Dam Mejiro Beauty	Partholon	Milesian	Oatflake
Dam Mejiro Beauty	Partholon	Paleo	Pharis
Dam Mejiro Beauty	Partholon	Paleo	Calonice
Dam Mejiro Beauty	Mejiro Nagasaki	Never Beat	Never Say Die
Dam Mejiro Beauty	Mejiro Nagasaki	Never Beat	Bride Elect
Dam Mejiro Beauty	Mejiro Nagasaki	Mejiro Bosatsu	Montaval
Dam Mejiro Beauty	Mejiro Nagasaki	Mejiro Bosatsu	Mejiro Queen (Family 10-d)
