= Loves Only You =

Japanese Thoroughbred racehorse

Loves Only You ラヴズオンリーユー
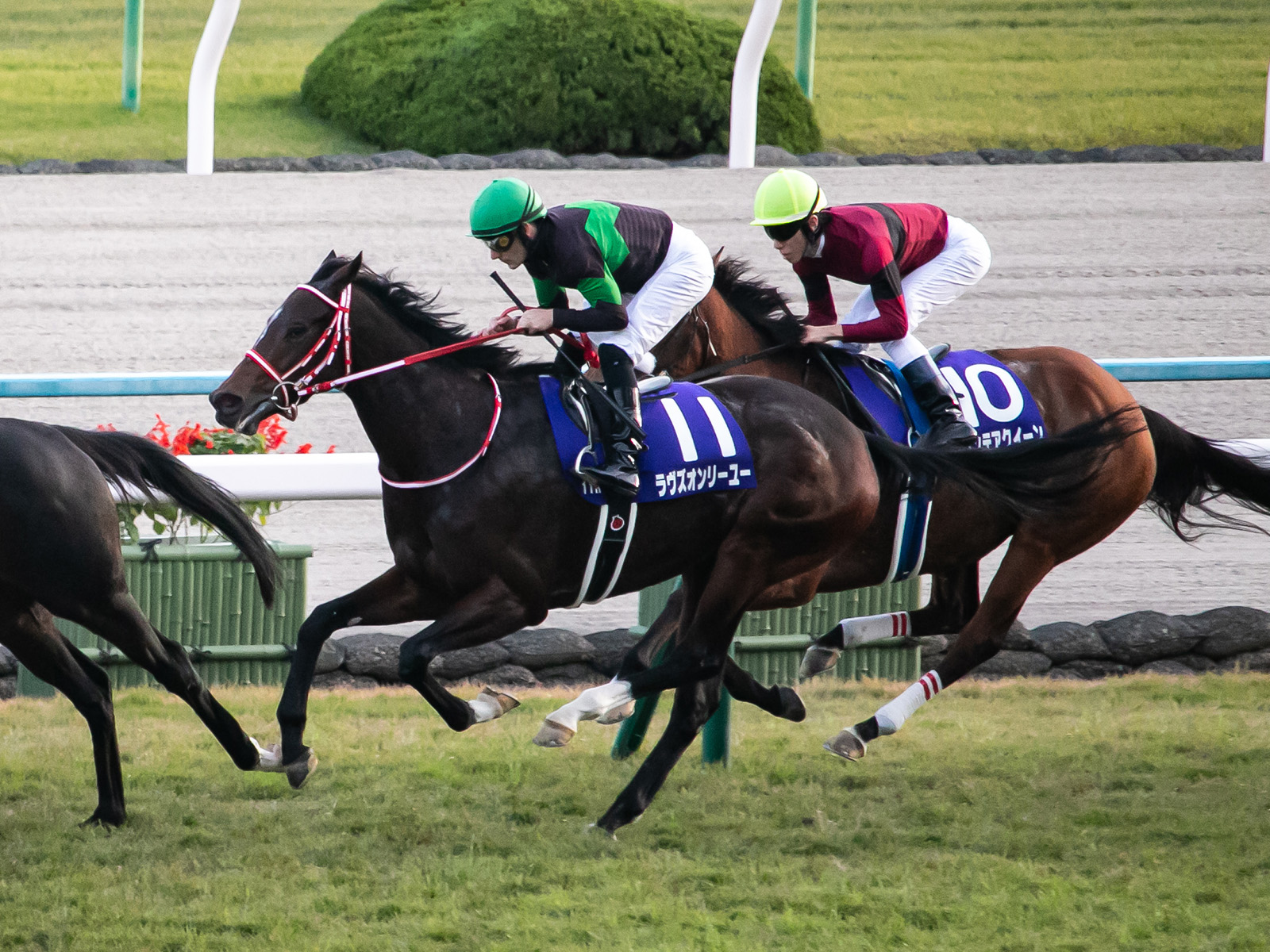
- Breed: Thoroughbred
- Sire: Deep Impact
- Grandsire: Sunday Silence
- Dam: Loves Only Me
- Damsire: Storm Cat
- Sex: Mare
- Foaled: March 26, 2016 (age 10)
- Country: Japan
- Colour: Bay
- Breeder: Northern Farm
- Owner: DMM Dream Club Co Ltd
- Racing colours
- Trainer: Yoshito Yahagi
- Jockey: Mirco Demuro; Yuga Kawada
- Record: 16: 8-2-3
- Earnings: ¥913,948,700; Japan : ¥338,749,000; UAE : $500,000 USD; HK : $31,350,000 HKD; USA : $1,040,000 USD

Major wins
- Kyoto Kinen (2021); Queen Elizabeth II Cup (2021); Hong Kong Cup (2021); Japanese Classic Tiara Race wins: Yushun Himba (2019); Breeders' Cup wins: Breeders' Cup Filly & Mare Turf (2021)

Awards
- American Champion Turf Female (2021); JRA Award for Best Older Filly or Mare (2021)

Honours
- NTRA Moment of the Year (2021)
- Last updated on 10 February 2021

Loves Only You (Japanese: ラヴズオンリーユー, Hepburn: Ravuzu Onrii Yuu; foaled 26 March 2016) is a Japanese Thoroughbred racehorse. She showed promise as a two-year-old when she won both her races. In the following spring she took the Wasurenagusa Sho before extending her unbeaten run to four by winning the Yushun Himba in record time. She sustained her first defeat in November 2019 when she ran third in the Queen Elizabeth II Cup. She failed to win in five starts as a four-year-old in 2020, but returned to her best form in 2021 when she won the Kyoto Kinen, Queen Elizabeth II Cup, the Breeders' Cup Filly & Mare Turf in the United States and the Hong Kong Cup. She was awarded an Eclipse Award as the American Champion Female Turf Horse for 2021, as well as the JRA Award for Best Older Filly or Mare of the same year.

== Background ==
Loves Only You is a bay mare with a short white blaze and a white socks on her left hind and forelegs bred in Hokkaido by Northern Farm. As a yearling in 2017 she was consigned to the Select Sale and was bought for ¥172,800,000 by DMM.com Co Ltd, as one of the horses that the company offered for shared ownership among users of the website. She was sent into training with Yoshito Yahagi.

She was from the ninth crop of foals sired by Deep Impact, who was the Japanese Horse of the Year in 2005 and 2006, winning races including the Tokyo Yushun, Tenno Sho, Arima Kinen and Japan Cup. Deep Impact's other progeny include Gentildonna, Harp Star, Kizuna, A Shin Hikari, Marialite and Saxon Warrior. Loves Only You's dam Loves Only Me, a half-sister to Rumplestiltskin, was trained in Ireland but never raced and was exported to Japan after being sold for $900,000 at Keeneland in November 2009. She was a granddaughter of the outstanding racehorse and broodmare Miesque. Loves Only Me has also produced Loves Only You's full brother Real Steel, winner of the Dubai Turf.

== Racing career ==
=== 2018: two-year-old season ===
On 3 November at Kyoto Racecourse Loves Only You began her track career in an event for previously unraced juveniles over 1800 metres and won from Arden Forest. Twenty-two days later at the same track the filly started the 1.3/1 favourite for the Shiragiku Sho over 1600 metres in which she was ridden by Yasunari Iwata and won by one and three quarter lengths from Rambling Alley.

=== 2019: three-year-old season ===
Loves Only You made her three-year-old debut in the Listed Wasurenagusa Sho over 2000 metres at Hanshin Racecourse on 7 April in which she was ridden by Mirco Demuro. Despite starting badly and meeting with interference she produced a strong late run and won by three lengths. Demuro later commented "It was an easy win... She got bumped a bit at the break and got upset and clamped down on the bit until the first turn. But, she's a very clever horse and calmed right down".

On 19 May Loves Only You was stepped up in class and distance for the Grade 1 Yushun Himba over 2400 metres at Tokyo Racecourse in which she was partnered by Demuro and started the 3/1 favourite. Second choice in the betting was Chrono Genesis (winner of the Queen Cup) while the other sixteen runners included Contra Check (Flower Cup), Danon Fantasy, Shigeru Pink Dia (runner-up in the Oka Sho), Victoria (Flora Stakes), Schon Glanz (Artemis Stakes), Figlia Pura (Fairy Stakes) and No One (Fillies' Revue). The outsider Jodie set the pace from Contra Check and Aile Voix while Loves Only You raced in mid division before moving to the outside to make her challenge in the straight. Curren Bouquetd'or went to the front approaching the last 400 metres but Loves Only You produced a sustained run on the outside to gain the advantage in the final strides and win by a neck with two and a half lengths back to Chrono Genesis in third. The winning time of 2:22.8 was a new race record. After the race Demuro said "I was a bit worried at the final corner since we were in a lower position than planned, but she showed an incredible burst of speed and stretched beautifully. She has a heart of steel".

It was intended to bring Loves Only You back in autumn for the Shuka Sho but she missed the race after being found to have an inflamed tendon. The filly eventually made her comeback in the Grade 1 Queen Elizabeth II Cup when she was matched against older fillies and mares for the first time. Starting the 1.5/1 favourite she raced in second place for most of the way but was unable to quicken in the straight and came home third behind Lucky Lilac and the front-running Crocosmia.

In January 2020, at the JRA Awards for 2019, Loves Only You finished runner-up to Gran Alegria in the poll to determine the JRA Award for Best Three-Year-Old Filly, taking 99 of the 274 votes.

=== 2020: four-year-old season ===
In the spring of 2020 Loves Only You was sent to Meydan Racecourse in Dubai to contest the Sheema Classic in March, but the meeting was abandoned owing to the COVID-19 pandemic. The filly returned to Japan and made her 2020 debut on 17 May when she started 8.5/1 third choice in the betting for the Victoria Mile at Tokyo, but after racing in mid-division she struggled to obtain a clear run and came home seventh behind Almond Eye and Sound Chiara. The filly dropped to Grade 3 class and matched against male opponents in the Naruo Kinen over 2000 metres at Hanshin on 6 June when she started the 0.8/1 favourite but was beaten a nose by the eight-year-old Perform A Promise.

After a five-month break Loves Only You returned to the track at Tokyo in October and finished fifth behind Salacia when favourite for the Grade 2 Fuchu Himba Stakes over 1800 metres. On 15 November the filly started the 4.5/1 third choice for the Queen Elizabeth II Cup over 2200 metres at Hanshin. After racing in eleventh place she produced a strong late run on the outside and finished third behind Lucky Lilac and Salacia, beaten half a length by the winner. The filly ended her season in the Arima Kinen over 2500 metres at Nakayama Racecourse when she started the 14.5/1 sixth choice in the betting and came home tenth of the sixteen runners behind Chrono Genesis, beaten six lengths by the winner.

=== 2021: five-year old season ===
Loves Only You started her 2021 season at the Kyoto Kinen, where she won her first race in 21 months after passing fellow stablemate Stay Foolish. She then returned to Dubai to once again run the Sheema Classic, where she finished third behind Mishriff and Chrono Genesis after briefly being in the lead. Loves Only You did not return to Japan after the Sheema Classic but instead went to Hong Kong to compete in the Queen Elizabeth II Cup. She entered the race with Vincent C Y Ho as her jockey, and won the race after beating the 2nd place by 3/4 lengths. With this win, this marked not only her second GI victory, but also finishing the race where the top four were Japanese-trained horses (Loves Only You, Glory Vase, Daring Tact, and Kiseki, in respective order).

Loves Only You returned to Japan for a brief period to race in the Sapporo Kinen with an American race in mind, where she finished in second place behind Sodashi. She was the most favored in that race, but was stuck in the back and had to run the fastest among the entrants for the last three furlongs to catch up.

Loves Only You was the third favored at 4.30 odds on the Breeders' Cup Filly & Mare Turf behind War Like Goddess and Love, who was the two filly crown winner of the previous year in England. The race started with Loves Only You and her jockey Yuga Kawada placing themselves in fourth or fifth place with Going to Vegas leading early. War Like Goddess and Love then each moved five wide to take the lead at the far turn, with My Sister Nat engaging the former in the final stretch, before Loves Only You passed them and won against My Sister Nat in a half-length lead. She was the first Japanese-trained horse to win the race, while her jockey and trainer also recorded their first victory in the event. This race also marked Kawada's first victory abroad.

After her victory at Del Mar, Loves Only You did not return to Japan but instead headed back to Hong Kong to compete in the Hong Kong Cup, which was announced to be her final race. During the race, she was briefly stuck among the crowd of horses but managed to push herself through, and won the race after passing Russian Emperor as Hishi Iguazu came up to her and narrowing the lead.

After winning her final race, Loves Only You returned to Japan. A retirement ceremony was held at the Tokyo Racecourse on January 30, 2022, before she was returned to the Northern Farm for the 2022 breeding season.

== Racing form ==
Loves Only You won eight races in 16 starts. This data is available on JBIS, netkeiba, racingpost and HKJC.

Date	Track	Race	Grade	Distance (Condition)	Entry	HN	Odds (Favored)	Finish	Time	Margins	Jockey	Winner (Runner-up)
2018 – two-year-old season
Nov 3	Kyoto	2yo Newcomer		1,800 m (Firm)	8	1	2.3 (2)	1st	1:50.9	–0.2	Christophe Lemaire	(Arden Forest)
Nov 25	Kyoto	Shiragiku Sho	ALW (1W)	1,600 m (Firm)	9	7	2.3 (1)	1st	1:33.6	–0.3	Yasunari Iwata	(Rambling Alley)
2019 – three-year-old season
Apr 7	Hanshin	Wasurenagusa Sho	L	2,000 m (Firm)	9	7	1.5 (1)	1st	2:00.6	–0.5	Mirco Demuro	(Le Timbre)
May 19	Tokyo	Yushun Himba	1	2,400 m (Firm)	18	13	4.0 (1)	1st	2:22.8	0.0	Mirco Demuro	(Curren Bouquetd'or)
Nov 10	Kyoto	QEII Cup	1	2,200 m (Firm)	18	11	2.5 (1)	3rd	2:14.3	0.2	Mirco Demuro	Lucky Lilac
2020 – four-year-old season
May 17	Tokyo	Victoria Mile	1	1,600 m (Firm)	16	1	9.5 (3)	7th	1:31.8	1.2	Mirco Demuro	Almond Eye
Jun 6	Hanshin	Naruo Kinen	3	2,000 m (Firm)	16	7	1.8 (1)	2nd	2:00.1	0.0	Mirco Demuro	Perform a Promise
Oct 17	Tokyo	Ireland Trophy	2	1,800 m (Soft)	8	5	2.3 (1)	5th	1:49.3	0.8	Mirco Demuro	Salacia
Nov 15	Hanshin	QEII Cup	1	2,200 m (Firm)	18	11	5.5 (3)	3rd	2:10.4	0.1	Mirco Demuro	Lucky Lilac
Dec 27	Nakayama	Arima Kinen	1	2,500 m (Firm)	16	4	15.5 (6)	10th	2:35.9	0.9	Mirco Demuro	Chrono Genesis
2021 – five-year-old season
Feb 14	Hanshin	Kyoto Kinen	2	2,200 m (Firm)	11	4	1.8 (1)	1st	R2:10.4	–0.2	Yuga Kawada	(Stay Foolish)
Mar 27	Meydan	Dubai Sheema Classic	1	2,410 m (Firm)	9	10	20/1 (5)	3rd	2:26.8	0.1	Oisin Murphy	Mishriff
Apr 25	Sha Tin	QEII Cup (HK)	1	2,000 m (Firm)	7	7	5.8 (4)	1st	2:01.2	–0.1	Vincent C Y Ho	(Glory Vase)
Aug 22	Sapporo	Sapporo Kinen	2	2,000 m (Firm)	13	4	1.9 (1)	2nd	1:59.6	0.1	Yuga Kawada	Sodashi
Nov 6	Del Mar	Breeders' Cup Filly & Mare Turf	1	1 3/8 miles (Firm)	12	8	43/10 (3)	1st	2:13.9	–0.1	Yuga Kawada	(My Sister Nat)
Dec 12	Sha Tin	Hong Kong Cup	1	2,000 m (Firm)	12	12	2.6 (1)	1st	2:00.7	0.0	Yuga Kawada	(Hishi Iguazu)

Legend:
Turf

- R indicated that it was a record finish time.

== Honors ==
Loves Only You was named the Best Older Filly or Mare of 2021 by the JRA for her victories abroad. She was also awarded the Eclipse Award as the American Champion Female Turf Horse in 2021 for her victory in the Breeders' Cup Filly & Mare Turf.

== Breeding career ==
Loves Only You gave birth to her first foal on February 27, 2023. The foal is a colt by Epiphaneia, the winner of the 2014 Japan Cup. The colt was later named Loves Premium.

c = colt, f = filly

No.	Name	Foaled	Sex	Color	Sire	Owner	Trainer	Races	Wins	Remarks
1st	Loves Premium	2023	c	Bay	Epiphaneia	DMM Dream Club	Yoshito Yahagi (Ritto)	8	0	Active
2nd	Odio Perdere	2024	c	Bay	Rey de Oro	DMM Dream Club	Yoshito Yahagi (Ritto)			Pre-debut
3rd	Laville le Coeur	2025	c	Bay	Maurice	DMM Dream Club	Yoshito Yahagi (Ritto)			Pre-debut
4th	(Loves Only You 2026)	2026	f	Bay	Maurice					

== In popular culture ==
An anthropomorphized version of Loves Only You appears as a character in the Japanese multimedia franchise Umamusume: Pretty Derby, voiced by Miyu Kubota. She is a popular online streamer and influencer whose dream is to share her "love" with her fans around the world through her livestreaming content and performance in racing. She regularly collaborates with her childhood friend Marche Lorraine, who draws art for her livestreams to make up for her poor artistic skills; Loves is also one of the few people Marche can speak with normally without using her hand puppet.

== Pedigree ==
Pedigree of Loves Only You (JPN), bay filly 2016
Sire Deep Impact (JPN) 2002	Sunday Silence (USA); 1986	Halo	Hail to Reason
Sire Deep Impact (JPN) 2002	Sunday Silence (USA); 1986	Halo	Cosmah
Sire Deep Impact (JPN) 2002	Sunday Silence (USA); 1986	Wishing Well	Understanding
Sire Deep Impact (JPN) 2002	Sunday Silence (USA); 1986	Wishing Well	Mountain Flower
Sire Deep Impact (JPN) 2002	Wind in Her Hair (IRE); 1991	Alzao (USA)	Lyphard
Sire Deep Impact (JPN) 2002	Wind in Her Hair (IRE); 1991	Alzao (USA)	Lady Rebecca (GB)
Sire Deep Impact (JPN) 2002	Wind in Her Hair (IRE); 1991	Burghclere (GB)	Busted
Sire Deep Impact (JPN) 2002	Wind in Her Hair (IRE); 1991	Burghclere (GB)	Highclere
Dam Loves Only Me (USA) 2006	Storm Cat (USA); 1983	Storm Bird (CAN)	Northern Dancer
Dam Loves Only Me (USA) 2006	Storm Cat (USA); 1983	Storm Bird (CAN)	South Ocean
Dam Loves Only Me (USA) 2006	Storm Cat (USA); 1983	Terlingua	Secretariat
Dam Loves Only Me (USA) 2006	Storm Cat (USA); 1983	Terlingua	Crimson Saint
Dam Loves Only Me (USA) 2006	Monevassia (USA); 1994	Mr. Prospector	Raise a Native
Dam Loves Only Me (USA) 2006	Monevassia (USA); 1994	Mr. Prospector	Gold Digger
Dam Loves Only Me (USA) 2006	Monevassia (USA); 1994	Miesque	Nureyev
Dam Loves Only Me (USA) 2006	Monevassia (USA); 1994	Miesque	Pasadoble (Family: 20)
