= Marche Lorraine (horse) =

Japanese thoroughbred

Marche Lorraine マルシュロレーヌ
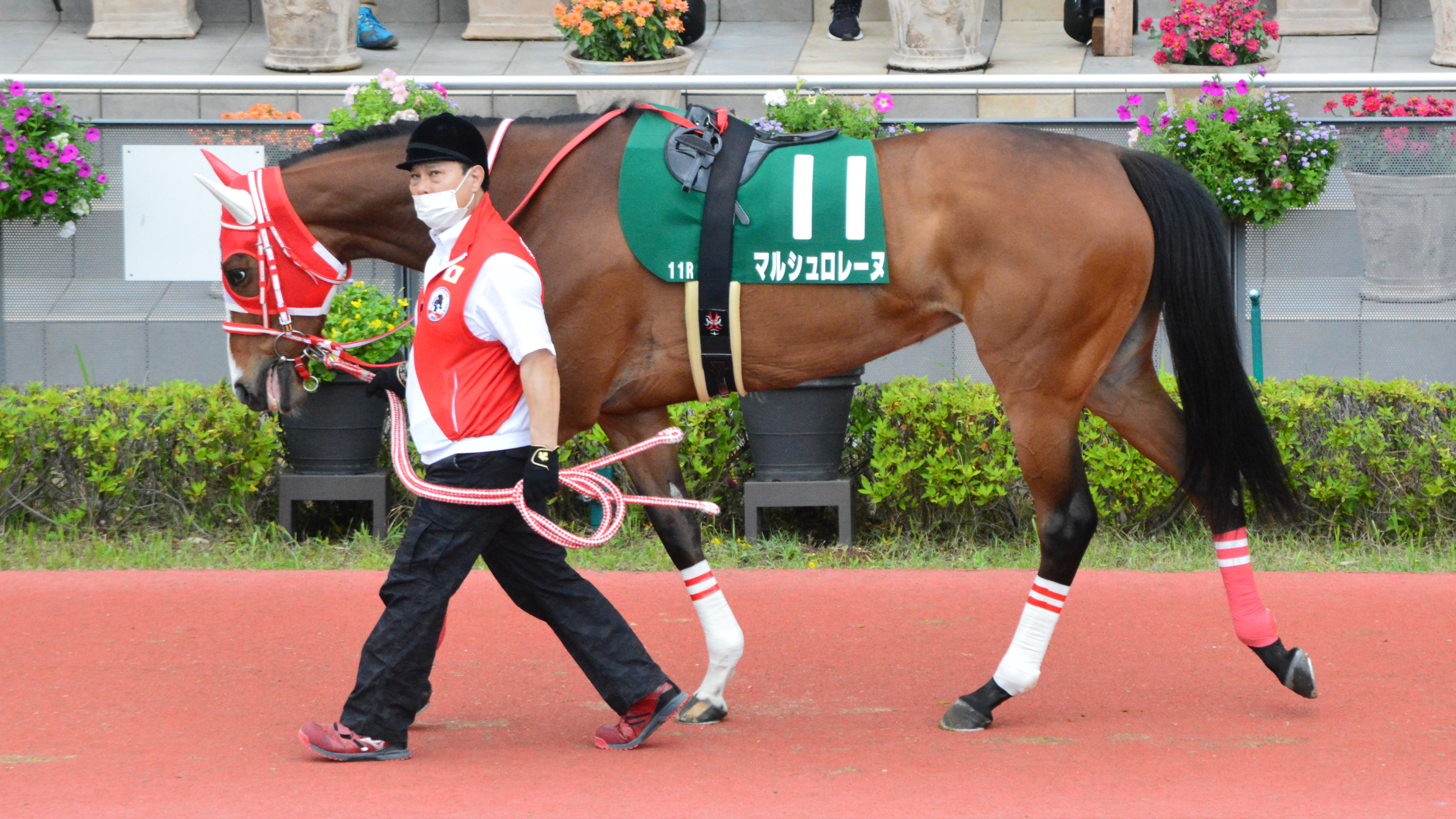
- Marche Lorraine in May 2021.
- Breed: Thoroughbred
- Sire: Orfevre (JPN)
- Grandsire: Stay Gold (JPN)
- Dam: Vite Marcher (JPN)
- Damsire: French Deputy (US)
- Sex: Mare
- Foaled: February 4, 2016 (age 10); Northern Farm, Abira, Hokkaido, Japan
- Country: Japan
- Color: Bay
- Breeder: Northern Farm
- Owner: Carrot Farm
- Racing colors
- Trainer: Yoshito Yahagi
- Jockey: Oisin Murphy; Yuga Kawada
- Record: 22: 9-2-2
- Earnings: 369,440,800 JPY; JPN：193,279,000 JPY (JRA)66,079,000 JPY (NAR)127,200,000 JPY; Abroad：1,640,000 USD (USA)1,040,000 USD (KSA)600,000 USD

Major wins
- Ladies' Prelude (2020); TCK Jo-o Hai (2021); Empress Hai (2021); Breeders' Gold Cup (2021); Breeders' Cup wins: Breeders' Cup Distaff (2021)

Awards
- NAR Grand Prix Special Award (2021)

Honours
- NTRA Moment of the Year (2021)

Marche Lorraine (Japanese: マルシュロレーヌ, Hepburn: Marushu Rorēnu; foaled February 4, 2016) is a retired Japanese Thoroughbred racehorse. She is known for being the first Japanese and non-North American trained horse to win the Breeders' Cup Distaff, the race that concludes the dirt filly races of that season, in 2021.

== Background ==
Marche Lorraine was born at the Northern Farm in Abira, Hokkaido on February 4, 2016. Her sire, Orfevre, won 6 G1s including 2011 triple crown and 2 Arima Kinen. Her dam, Vite Marcher, did not have a remarkable race career with only 1 win in her 9 starts, but her mother, Kyoei March, won five group races including the Oka Sho. Kyoei March only produced 4 crops before dying, and Vite Marcher was the only filly. The horse was offered for 75,000 JPY a share for a total of 30 million yen by Carrot Farm, a Hitokuchi Banushi organization that offers stakes in horse ownership.

Marche Lorraine's name is derived from the French patriotic song of the same name.

== Racing career ==
=== 2019: Three-year old season ===
After being sent to Yoshito Yahagi's stable at the Ritto Training Center, she made her debut at a maiden race on February 3 held at Kyoto Racecourse, where she came in 2nd behind I Love Tailor. She would win her first race after 5 starts. She finished that year with an additional victory, with her total wins at 2 out of 7 starts.

=== 2020: Four-year old season ===
Marche Lorraine won her 3rd win at her first race of the season, which was the Shikoku Shimbun Hai. She ran in group races but could not win before turning to dirt races after coming in second place at the Hakata Stakes on August 16.

After winning her first dirt race, she went on to run her first NAR race at the Ladies' Prelude, where she won the race with a 3 lengths lead, making it her first group race win. Later on she entered the Japan Breeding farm's Cup Ladies' Classic, where the horse became the most favored, but wound up in 3rd place to Fashionista.

=== 2021: Five-year old season ===
Marche Lorraine's first race of the season was the TCK Jo-o Hai, which she won. She also won her next race, the Empress Hai, where she passed the other horses from the rear. The horse was sent to run in mixed-gender races after this, and while she came in 3rd at the Heian Stakes, she finished at 8th at the Teio Sho. Marche Lorraine returned to filly-only races and won the Breeders' Gold Cup showing her strength once again.

Marche Lorraine finished her season with her first race abroad, with her entering the Breeders' Cup Distaff held at Del Mar Fairgrounds on November 6. She placed herself in the rear of the pack in the early stages of the race, and took the lead at around the 4th corner, where she went neck-and-neck against Dunbar Road before winning the race, making it her first G1 victory.。This race also marked the first victory of an international dirt G1 race abroad for a Japanese-trained horse. As a result, the horse was awarded the 2021 NAR Grand Prix Special Awards. She was also nominated for the American Champion Older Dirt Female Horse of the Eclipse Awards that year but lost to Letruska. Marche Lorraine was, however, awarded the National Thoroughbred Racing Association Moment of the Year together with Loves Only You.

=== 2022: Six-year old season ===
Marche Lorraine entered the Saudi Cup that year as her final race of her career before retiring to stud, with Christophe Soumillon as her jockey. She could not win that race and finished in 6th place. Her racehorse registration was withdrawn as of March 9 to become a broodmare at the Northern Farm Airport Farm. She was bred with Drefong for her first season.

== Racing statistics ==
The list below is based on information available at JBIS Search, netkeiba.com as well as equibase.com, Sakab Jockey Club, and Racing Post.

Date	Racecourse	Race	Group	Track and distance	Entry	PP	Odds (Favored)	Finished	Time	Jockey	1st place（2nd place）
2019 – three-year-old season
Feb 3	Kyoto	3-Year-Old Newcomer		Turf 1600m	16	16	8.9（4th）	2nd	1:37.0	Kenichi Ikezoe	I Love Tailor
Feb 23	Hanshin	3-Year-Old Maiden Race		Turf 1800m	14	9	6.3（5th）	5th	1:48.6	Ryusei Sakai	Danon Teio
May 25	Kyoto	3-Year-Old Maiden Race		Turf 1600m	18	18	9.1（4th）	9th	1:34.3	Kenichi Ikezoe	Midsummer House
Jul 21	Chukyo	3-Year-Old Maiden Race		Turf 1600m	16	1	3.9（3rd）	5th	1:36.3	Yuichi Fukunaga	Mani
Aug 10	Kokura	3-Year-Old Maiden Race		Turf 1800m	16	9	7.0（4th）	1st	1:47.0	Yuichi Fukunaga	（Essenza）
Oct 19	Niigata	3-Year-Old & Up C1W		Turf 1600m	18	18	6.6（2nd）	6th	1:36.4	Katsuharu Tanaka	Candy Storm
Nov 3	Fukushima	3-Year-Old & Up C1W		Turf 2000m	14	2	6.5（4th）	1st	1:59.8	Yukito Ishikawa	（La Raison）
2020 – four-year-old season
Mar 29	Hanshin	Shikoku Shimbun Hai	C2W	Turf 2000m	9	1	9.1（5th）	1st	2:01.4	Ryusei Sakai	（Rambling Alley）
Apr 25	Fukushima	Fukushima Himba Stakes	GIII	Turf 1800m	16	7	20.4（8th）	9th	1:47.8	Ryusei Sakai	Fairy Polka
May 16	Niigata	Pearl Stakes	C3W	Turf 1800m	14	3	9.4（4th）	12th	1:48.7 (34.4)	Yuta Nakatani	Andraste
Jun 14	Hanshin	Mermaid Stakes	GIII	Turf 2000m	16	15	29.2（13th）	6th	2:01.7 (37.0)	Ryo Takakura	Summer Scent
Aug 16	Kokura	Hakata Stakes	C3W	Turf 2000m	9	8	6.0（3rd）	2nd	1:57.9 (35.5)	Yutaka Take	Cathedral Bell
Sep 5	Kokura	Sakurajima Stakes	C3W	Dirt 1700m	14	3	3.8（2nd）	1st	1:43.7 (35.0)	Yuga Kawada	（Kurino Flash）
Oct 8	Ohi	Ladies Prelude	JpnII	Dirt 1800m	16	10	2.3（1st）	1st	1:52.1 (36.8)	Yuga Kawada	（Madras Check）
Nov 3	Ohi	JBC Ladies' Classic	JpnI	Dirt 1800m	15	13	1.3（1st）	3rd	1:51.7 (37.8)	Yuga Kawada	Fashionisa
2021 – five-year-old season
Jan 20	Ohi	TCK Jo-o Hai	JpnIII	Dirt 1800m	9	4	1.9（1st）	1st	1:53.7 (37.0)	Yuga Kawada	（Reine Blanche）
Mar 4	Kawasaki	Empress Hai	JpnII	Dirt 2100m	11	11	2.3（1st）	1st	2:14.1 (38.9)	Yuga Kawada	（Salsa Dione）
May 22	Chukyo	Heian Stakes	GIII	Dirt 1900m	16	11	5.6（3rd）	3rd	1:55.9 (37.1)	Yuga Kawada	Auvergne
Jun 30	Ohi	Teio Sho	JpnI	Dirt 2000m	13	12	55.0（9th）	8th	2:04.8 (38.7)	Taito Mori	T O Keynes
Aug 12	Monbetsu	Breeders Gold Cup	JpnIII	Dirt 2000m	8	5	1.5（1st）	1st	2:06.6 (36.5)	Yuga Kawada	（Linen Fashion）
Nov 6 (Note: PST)	Del Mar	BC Distaff	G1	Dirt 1 1/8 miles	11	10	51.0（9th）	1st	1:47.67	Oisin Murphy	（Dunbar Road）
2022 – six-year-old season
Feb 26	KAA	Saudi Cup	G1	Dirt 1800m	14	14	21.0（11th）	6th	1:52.75	Christophe Soumillon	Emblem Road

== Breeding career ==
c = colt, f = filly

No.	Name	Foaled	Sex	Color	Sire	Wins	Races	Remarks
1st	Marche Bonheur	2023	f	Chestnut	Drefong	0	7	Retired, broodmare
2nd	Stanislas	2024	c	Bay	Kitasan Black	0	1	Active
3rd	(Marche Lorraine 2025)	2025	c	Dark Bay	Kizuna			
4th	(Marche Lorraine 2026)	2026	c		Epiphaneia			

== In popular culture ==
An anthropomorphized version of Marche Lorraine appears as a character in the Japanese multimedia franchise Umamusume: Pretty Derby, voiced by Tsukino Chikasada. She is depicted as a highly talented artist, but struggles with extreme social anxiety that leaves her unable to communicate with others except through a hand puppet, who has a much more sociable and livelier personality. However, she is comfortable speaking normally around her schoolmates Orfevre and Loves Only You, who is also her childhood friend.

== Pedigree ==
Pedigree of Marche Lorraine
Sire Orfevre 2008 Ch.	Stay Gold; 1994 d.b	*Sunday Silence	Halo
Sire Orfevre 2008 Ch.	Stay Gold; 1994 d.b	*Sunday Silence	Wishing Well
Sire Orfevre 2008 Ch.	Stay Gold; 1994 d.b	Golden Sash	*Dictus
Sire Orfevre 2008 Ch.	Stay Gold; 1994 d.b	Golden Sash	Dyna Sash
Sire Orfevre 2008 Ch.	Oriental Art; 1997 Ch.	Mejiro McQueen	Mejiro Titan
Sire Orfevre 2008 Ch.	Oriental Art; 1997 Ch.	Mejiro McQueen	Mejiro Aurora
Sire Orfevre 2008 Ch.	Oriental Art; 1997 Ch.	Electro Art	*Northern Taste
Sire Orfevre 2008 Ch.	Oriental Art; 1997 Ch.	Electro Art	*Grandma Stevens
Dam Vite Marcher 2002 b.	*French Deputy; 1992 Ch.	Deputy Minister	Vice Regent
Dam Vite Marcher 2002 b.	*French Deputy; 1992 Ch.	Deputy Minister	Mint Copy
Dam Vite Marcher 2002 b.	*French Deputy; 1992 Ch.	Mitterand	Hold Your Peace
Dam Vite Marcher 2002 b.	*French Deputy; 1992 Ch.	Mitterand	Laredo Lass
Dam Vite Marcher 2002 b.	Kyoei March; 1994 b.	*Dancing Brave	Lyphard
Dam Vite Marcher 2002 b.	Kyoei March; 1994 b.	*Dancing Brave	Navajo Princess
Dam Vite Marcher 2002 b.	Kyoei March; 1994 b.	Inter Charmant	*Bravest Roman
Dam Vite Marcher 2002 b.	Kyoei March; 1994 b.	Inter Charmant	Tokino Shrilly

- Her half brother, Badenweiler, won the 2022 Mercury Cup and 2023 Saga Kinen.
- Marche Lorraine's niece, Namur, won the 2023 Mile Championship. Namur's sister, Ravel, won the Artemis Stakes and Challenge Cup.
- Marche Lorraine is the mareline descendant to Queen Narubi, making her a distant relative to Oguri Cap.
