= Taiki Shuttle =

American-bred Thoroughbred racehorse

Taiki Shuttle タイキシャトル
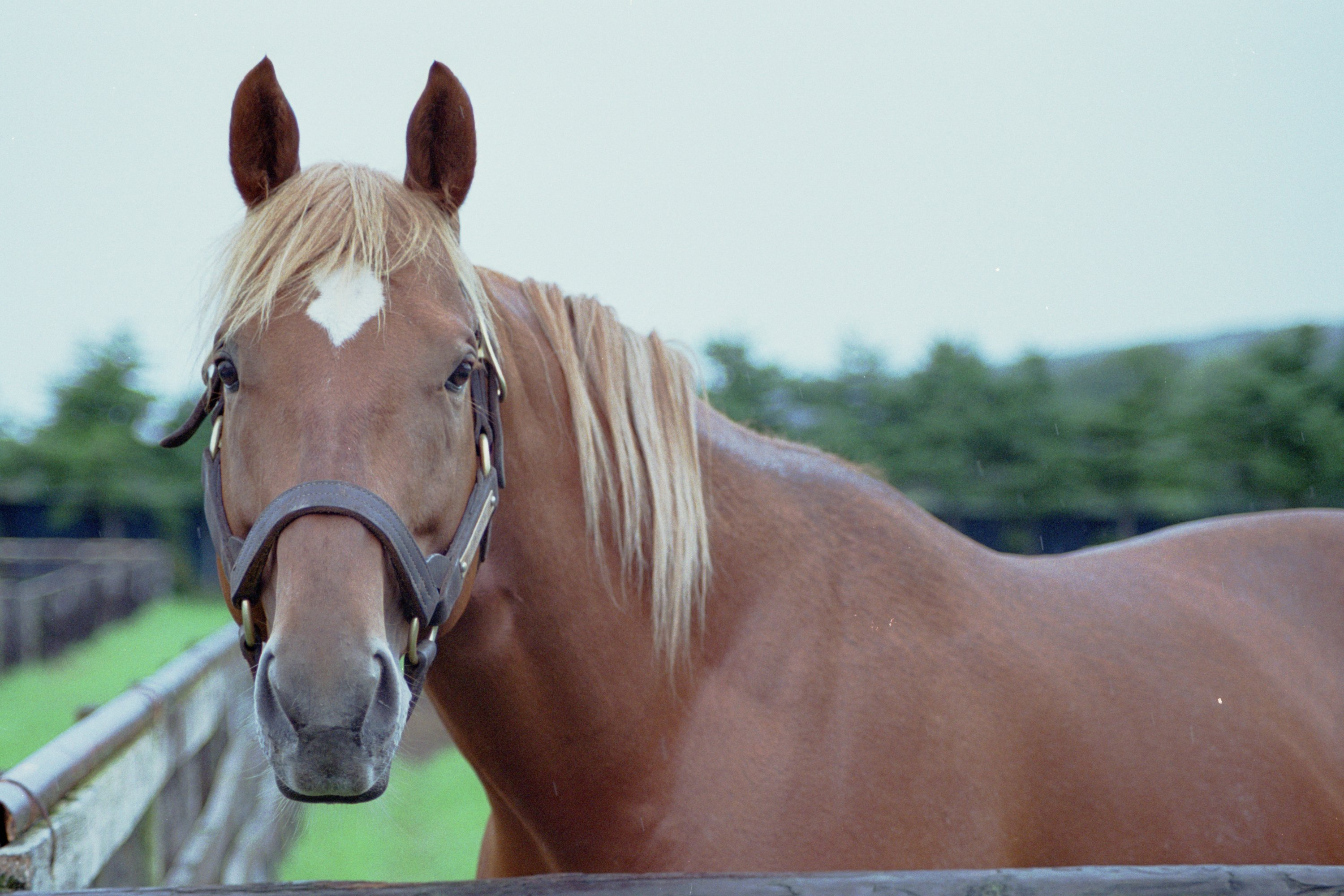
- Taiki Shuttle at Arrow Stud.
- Breed: Thoroughbred
- Sire: Devil's Bag (USA)
- Grandsire: Halo (USA)
- Dam: Welsh Muffin (USA)
- Damsire: Caerleon (USA)
- Sex: Stallion
- Foaled: March 23, 1994
- Died: August 17, 2022 (aged 28)
- Country: United States
- Colour: Chestnut
- Breeder: Taiki Farm
- Owner: Taiki Farm
- Racing colours
- Trainer: Kazuo Fujisawa
- Jockey: Yukio Okabe
- Record: 13: 11-1-1
- Earnings: ¥615,485,000; 1,000,000 F

Major wins
- Unicorn Stakes (1997); Swan Stakes (1997); Sprinters Stakes (1997); Mile Championship (1997, 1998); Keio Hai Spring Cup (1998); Yasuda Kinen (1998); Prix Jacques Le Marois (1998)

Awards
- JRA Award for Best Sprinter or Miler (1997, 1998); JRA Award for Best Older Male Horse (1998); Japanese Horse of the Year (1998)

Honours
- Japan Racing Association Hall of Fame (1999)

Taiki Shuttle (Japanese: タイキシャトル, Hepburn: Taiki Shatoru; March 23, 1994 – August 17, 2022) was an American-bred, Japanese-trained Thoroughbred racehorse and sire. He won races at the highest level both home and abroad, most notably winning the Mile Championship (twice), Yasuda Kinen, and Sprinters Stakes in Japan and the Prix Jacques Le Marois in France.

Taiki Shuttle was honored as the Japan Racing Association's (JRA) Champion Sprinter in both 1997 and 1998, and was named the Japan Horse of the Year in 1998, along with Champion Older Male Horse. In 1999, he was inducted into the JRA Hall of Fame.

Taiki Shuttle died due to advanced age on August 17, 2022. He had suffered a heart attack while he was sleeping.

== Background ==
Foaled in the United States, Taiki Shuttle was a flaxen chestnut horse with a large white star, bred and owned by Taiki Farm. Taiki Shuttle is a son of Devil's Bag, the 1983 American Champion Two-Year-Old Male Horse. His dam, Welsh Muffin, a daughter of Caerleon, was a stakes winner in Ireland.

Taiki Shuttle was originally slated to enter Fujisawa Stable's Miura training center in the fall of his juvenile year, but the schedule was delayed due to leg injury and hoof suppuration. He entered Fujisawa stable on February 5, 1997. Even after he entered the area, he was affected by an unresolved leg condition which deteriorated with training, so his debut was again delayed.

During his racing career he was trained by Kazuo Fujisawa.

== Racing career ==
=== 1997: three-year-old season ===
On April 19, 1997, his connections' patience paid off as Taiki Shuttle debuted in his maiden race at a 1600-meter dirt track, the Tokyo Racecourse. He won his next two races, including the Shobu Stakes on turf. He was defeated in his fourth start when running second to Tenzan Storm in the Bodaiju Stakes at Hanshin Racecourse. Next, Taiki Shuttle won his first graded stakes in the Group 3 Unicorn Stakes. He would not be defeated again until his final race.

He won the Group 2 Swan Stakes as a prep race for the Mile Championship, a prestigious mile race in Japan. He closed out the year with another win in the Sprinters Stakes. He was named Best Sprinter or Miler of 1997 by the Japanese Racing Association (JRA).

=== 1998: four-year-old season ===
Taiki Shuttle opened 1998 with a win in the Group 3 Keio Hai Spring Cup in May. The next month he won the Group 1 Yasuda Kinen. Taiki Shuttle was then shipped out to France to run in the Group 1 Prix Jacques Le Marois. He won the race and went on to win his second Mile Championship.

In his final career race, he tried to repeat a win in the Sprinters Stakes, but finished third behind Meiner Love.

Despite the loss, the JRA named Taiki Shuttle Horse of the Year, Best Sprinter or Miler, and Best Older Male of 1998.

== Honours ==
Taiki Shuttle was voted Japan's Champion Sprinter/ Miler in 1997 and 1998. In the latter year he has also named Japanese Champion Older Male Horse and Japanese Horse of the Year. He has been inducted into the Japan Racing Association Hall of Fame.

== Retirement and stud career ==
Taiki Shuttle stood his stallion career at stud at Arrow Stud in Shinhidaka (formerly Shizunai), Japan. He periodically shuttled to East Stud in Hokkaido.

Taiki Shuttle was pensioned from breeding and moved to Kimura Farm in 2018, a retirement facility for racehorses connected with East Stud and Versailles Farm. He was moved to the farm along with Meisho Doto, another pensioned stallion. The two underwent successful castration in January 2019.

On September 15, 2019, the manes of Taiki Shuttle and Rose Kingdom, a fellow JRA Champion, were mysteriously cut by an unknown person. It appeared that a sharp tool had been used to cut the hair, but the horses were otherwise unharmed. The farm filed a report with the Hokkaido Police and ceased visitation to the farm for security and investigative purposes. The suspect, 55 year old Kazuyo Tanaka from Kawaguchi, Saitama, was arrested the following year.

Taiki Shuttle, along with Meisho Doto, were moved from the Versailles Farm to the Northern Lake Farm on June 16, 2021. Taiki Shuttle would pass away at Northern Lake Farm the following year due to old age.

=== Notable progeny ===
Below data is based on JBIS Stallion Reports. c = colt, f = filly

bold = grade 1 stakes

Foaled	Name	Sex	Dam	Major Wins
2000	Win Kluger	c	Invite	**NHK Mile Cup**, Churchill Downs Cup
2001	Golden Cast	c	Return Bandam	Centaur Stakes (twice)
2001	Meisho Bowler	c	Nice Raise	**February Stakes,** Daily Hai Nisai Stakes, Negishi Stakes, Garnet Stakes (Japan), Kokura Nisai Stakes
2001	Winglet	f	Air Wings	Turquoise Stakes, Nakayama Himba Stakes
2001	Dear Chance	f	Maruka Moonlight	Mermaid Stakes (Japan)
2002	T M Churasan	f	Full Flings	Ibis Summer Dash
2002	Deep Summer	c	Chickaree	Yukan Fuji Sho Crystal Cup
2005	Satono Progress	c	Toyo Royal	New Zealand Trophy
2005	Summer Wind	c	Shin Wind	**Japan Breeding Farms' Cup Sprint**
2006	Red Spada	c	Barbicat	Keio Hai Spring Cup, Sekiya Kinen, Tokyo Shimbun Hai
2008	French Cactus	f	Brush With Tequila	Fillies' Revue

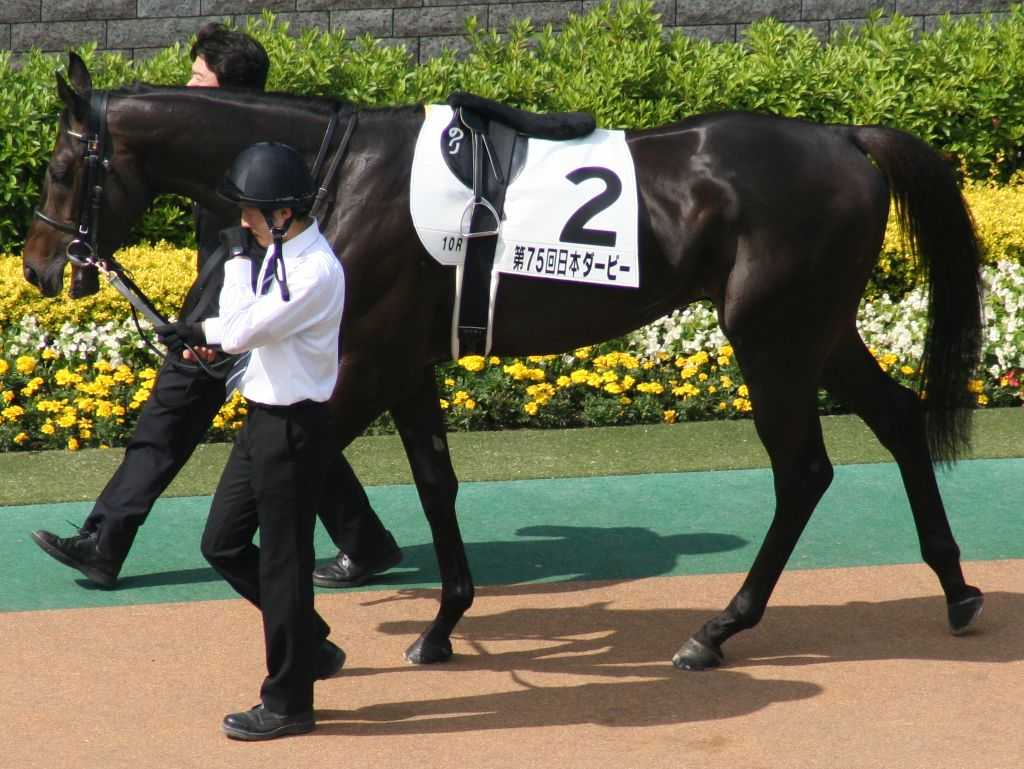
Win Kluger

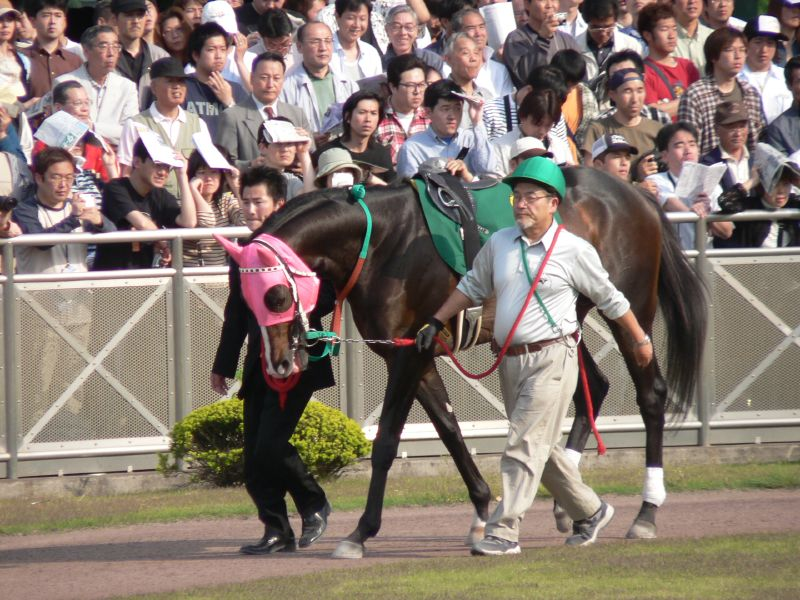
Meisho Bowler

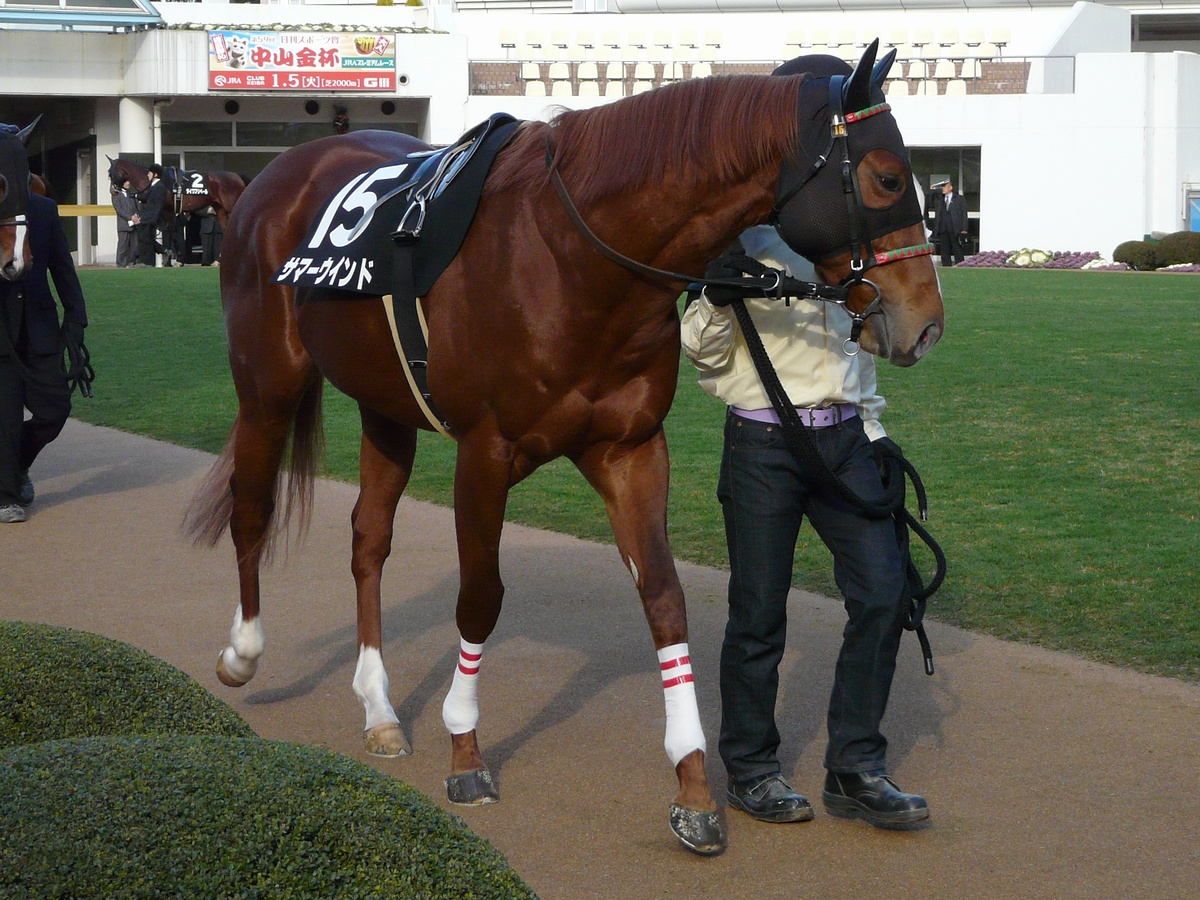
Summer Wind

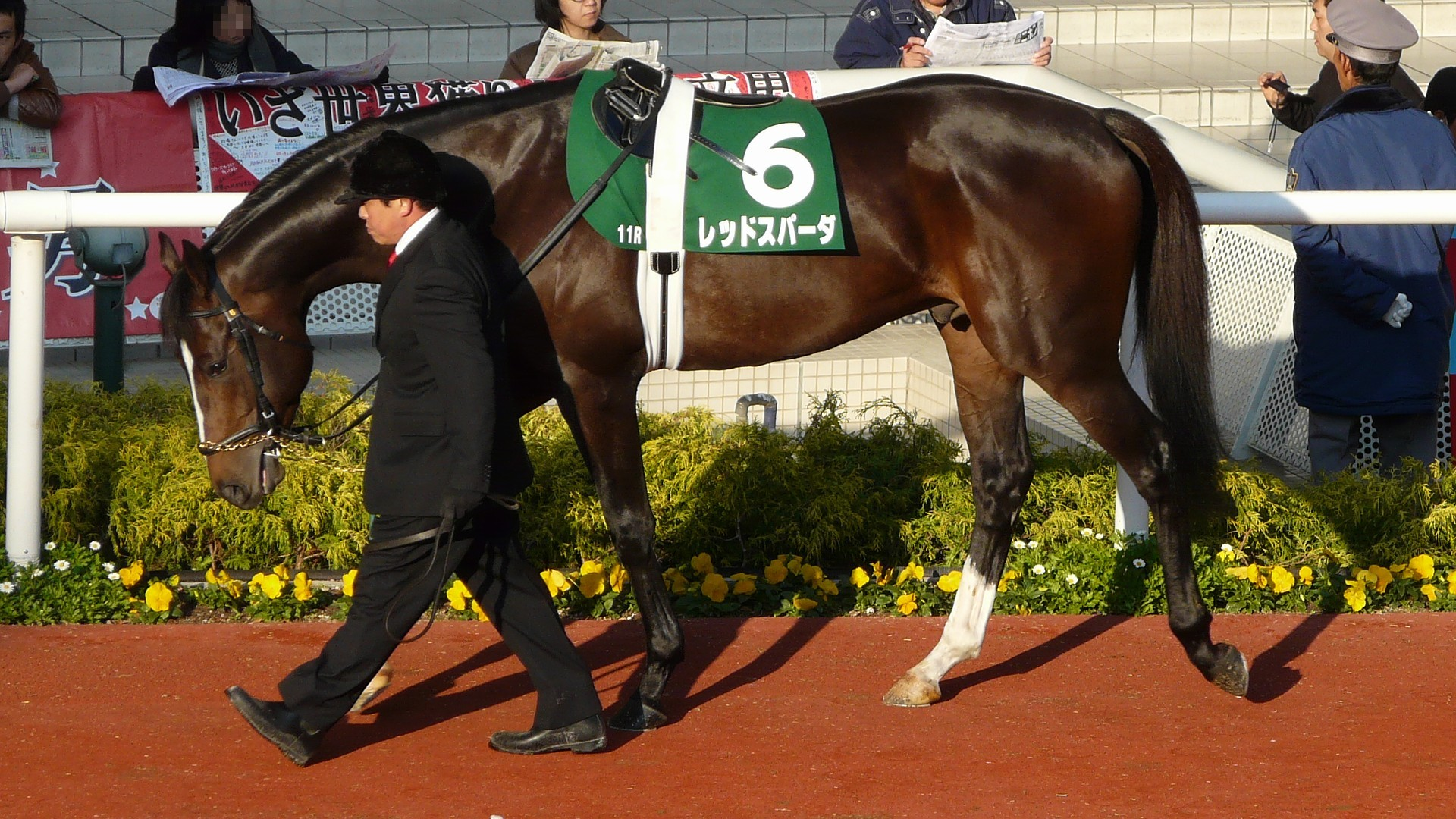
Red Spada

== In popular culture ==
An anthropomorphized version of Taiki Shuttle appears as a character in the Japanese multimedia franchise Umamusume: Pretty Derby, voiced by Yuka Ōtsubo. She is depicted as an outgoing, energetic, and friendly North American transfer student who enjoys barbecue, planning parties, and displaying affection by giving hugs, and is notable for often speaking English. However, she is rather simple-minded and dislikes being alone, oftentimes causing her to be clingy around close friends.

== Racing form ==
Taiki Shuttle won 11 races out of the 13 starts in which he placed second and third in another two. This data available is based on JBIS, netkeiba and irishracing.

Date	Age	Track	Race	Grade	Distance (Condition)	Entry	HN	Odds (Favored)	Finish	Time	Margins	Jockey	Winner (Runner-up)
Apr 19, 1997	3	Tokyo	3yo Newcomer		1,600 m (Fast)	16	10	2.8 (1)	1st	1:39.0	–0.7	Yukio Okabe	(Akashi Glisten)
May 3, 1997	3	Kyoto	3yo Allowance	1W	1,200 m (Fast)	16	3	2.1 (1)	1st	1:12.2	–0.2	Yukio Okabe	(Sound Cascade)
Jun 8, 1997	3	Tokyo	Shobu Stakes	OP	1,600 m (Firm)	9	8	3.0 (2)	1st	1:36.5	–0.2	Yukio Okabe	(Shinko Splendor)
Jul 6, 1997	3	Hanshin	Bodaiju Stakes	OP	1,600 m (Firm)	14	9	1.7 (1)	2nd	1:20.9	0.0	Yukio Okabe	Tenzan Storm
Oct 4, 1997	3	Tokyo	Unicorn Stakes	3	1,600 m (Fast)	16	3	5.1 (3)	1st	1:36.8	–0.4	Yukio Okabe	(Washington Color)
Oct 25, 1997	3	Kyoto	Swan Stakes	2	1,400 m (Firm)	16	9	4.8 (2)	1st	1:20.7	–0.1	Norihiro Yokoyama	(Sugino Hayakaze)
Nov 16, 1997	3	Kyoto	Mile Championship	1	1,600 m (Firm)	18	5	3.8 (2)	1st	1:33.3	–0.4	Norihiro Yokoyama	(Kyoei March)
Dec 14, 1997	3	Nakayama	Sprinters Stakes	1	1,200 m (Firm)	16	16	1.9 (1)	1st	1:07.8	–0.3	Yukio Okabe	(Sugino Hayakaze)
May 16, 1998	4	Tokyo	Keio Hai Spring Cup	2	1,400 m (Firm)	16	1	1.5 (1)	1st	R1:20.1	–0.2	Yukio Okabe	(Osumi Tycoon)
Jun 14, 1998	4	Tokyo	Yasuda Kinen	1	1,600 m (Heavy)	17	2	1.3 (1)	1st	1:37.5	–0.4	Yukio Okabe	(Oriental Express)
Aug 16, 1998	4	Deauville	Prix Jacques le Marois	1	1,600 m (Soft)	8	1	10/3 (1)	1st	1:37.4	–0.2	Yukio Okabe	(Among Men)
Nov 22, 1998	4	Kyoto	Mile Championship	1	1,600 m (Firm)	13	9	1.3 (1)	1st	1:33.3	–0.8	Yukio Okabe	(Big Sunday)
Dec 20, 1998	4	Nakayama	Sprinters Stakes	1	1,200 m (Firm)	15	13	1.1 (1)	3rd	1:08.6	0.0	Yukio Okabe	Meiner Love

Legend:
Turf Dirt

- R indicated that it was a record finish time.

== Pedigree ==
Pedigree of Taiki Shuttle
Sire Devil's Bag	Halo	Hail to Reason	Turn-to
Sire Devil's Bag	Halo	Hail to Reason	Nothirdchance
Sire Devil's Bag	Halo	Cosmah	Cosmic Bomb
Sire Devil's Bag	Halo	Cosmah	Almahmoud
Sire Devil's Bag	Ballade	Herbager	Vandale
Sire Devil's Bag	Ballade	Herbager	Flagette
Sire Devil's Bag	Ballade	Miss Swapsco	Cohoes
Sire Devil's Bag	Ballade	Miss Swapsco	Soaring
Dam Welsh Muffin	Caerleon	Nijinsky	Northern Dancer
Dam Welsh Muffin	Caerleon	Nijinsky	Flaming Page
Dam Welsh Muffin	Caerleon	Foreseer	Round Table
Dam Welsh Muffin	Caerleon	Foreseer	Regal Gleam
Dam Welsh Muffin	Muffitys	Thatch	Forli
Dam Welsh Muffin	Muffitys	Thatch	Thong
Dam Welsh Muffin	Muffitys	Contrail	Roan Rocket
Dam Welsh Muffin	Muffitys	Contrail	Azurine

Taiki Shuttle has a 3x5 inbreeding of Hail to Reason and a 5x5 inbreed of Mahmoud.

== See also ==
- List of racehorses
