= Yoshito Yahagi =

Japanese race horse trainer

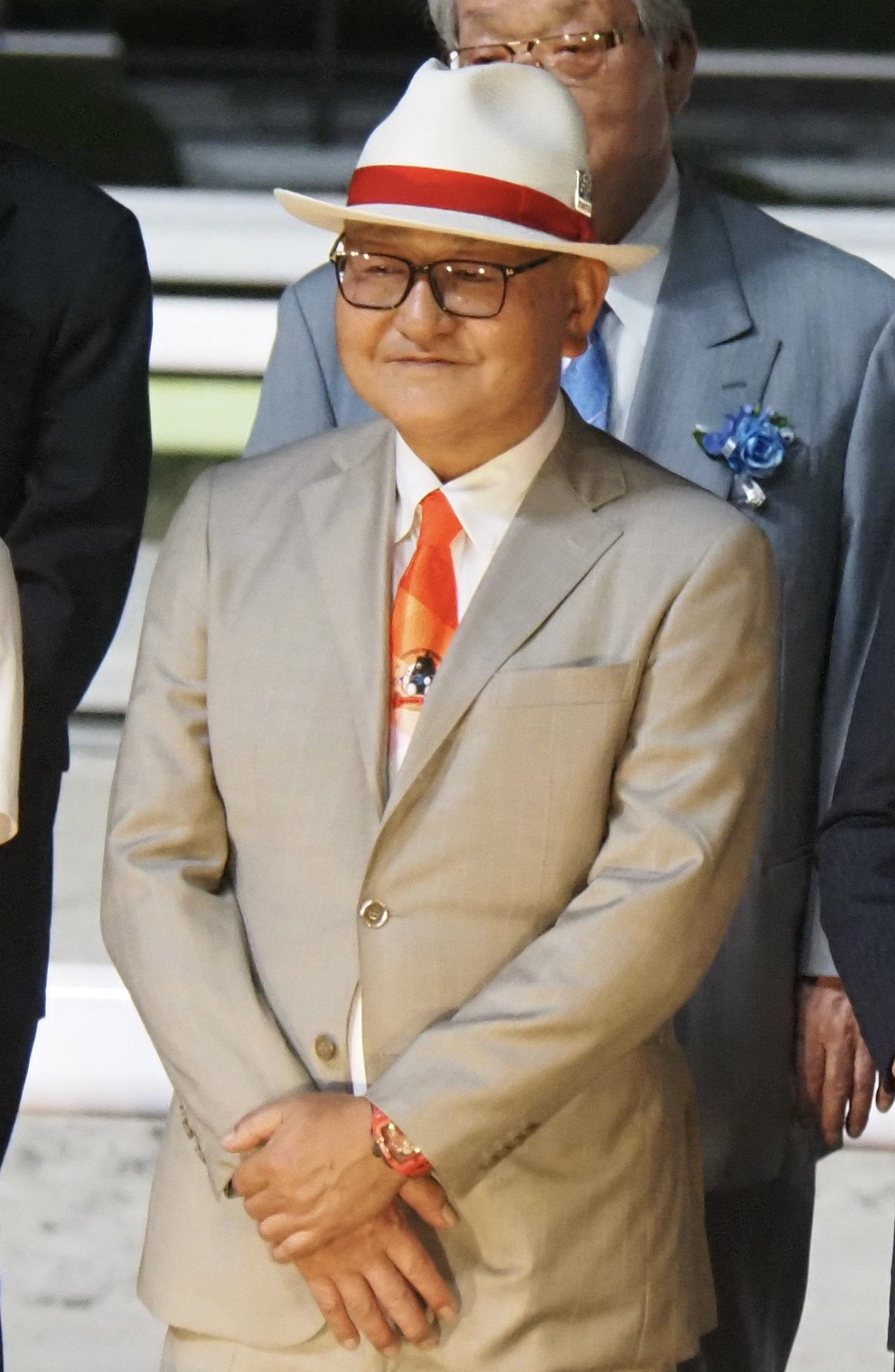
- Yahagi in 2024 (Japan Dirt Classic)

Personal information
- Native name: 矢作芳人
- Nationality: Japanese
- Born: 20 March 1961 (age 65) Shinagawa, Tokyo, Japan
- Occupation: Trainer
- Website: Official Website

Horse racing career
- Sport: Horse racing

Racing awards
- JRA Award for Best Trainer (races won) (2014, 2016, 2020, 2021; JRA Award for Best Trainer (money earned) (2019-2023); JRA Award for Best trainer (training technique) (2020, 2021)

Significant horses
- Grand Prix Boss, Deep Brillante, Real Steel, Mozu Ascot, Lys Gracieux, Loves Only You, Contrail, Marche Lorraine, Panthalassa, Forever Young

Yoshito Yahagi (Japanese: 矢作 芳人, Hepburn: Yahagi Yoshito; born March 20, 1961, in Tokyo, Japan) is a trainer of Thoroughbred race horses. He has been a licensed trainer in Japan since 2004 and since 2014 has won the training title three times.

After studying English at Athénée Français for six months, he went to Australia to learn horse training. He says he chose Australia because it was similar to Japan in that horse racing is dominated by speed on turf courses, the stable system, and the quarantine system are very strict and the environment internationally isolated.

He has trained Contrail, the 2020 Japanese Triple Crown winner. In the 2021 Breeders' Cup, Yahagi trained two winners—Filly & Mare Turf winner Loves Only You and Distaff winner Marche Lorraine. He became the first Japanese trainer to win any Breeders' Cup race. He was also the first Japanese trainer to win the Breeders' Cup Classic in 2025. He won the race with Forever Young, who has accumulated the second most earnings for a racehorse.

== Major wins ==
Japan

- Asahi Hai Futurity Stakes - (1) - Grand Prix Boss (2010)
- NHK Mile Cup - (1) - Grand Prix Boss (2011)
- Tokyo Yūshun (Japanese Derby) - (2) - Deep Brillante (2012), Contrail (2020)
- Japan Breeding farms' Cup Sprint - (1) - Taisei Legend (2012)
- Yasuda Kinen - (1) - Mozu Ascot (2018)
- Queen Elizabeth II Cup - (1) - Lys Gracieux (2018)
- Yushun Himba (Japanese Oaks) - (1) - Loves Only You (2019)
- Takarazuka Kinen - (1) - Lys Gracieux (2019)
- Arima Kinen - (1) - Lys Gracieux (2019)
- Hopeful Stakes - (1) - Contrail (2019)
- February Stakes - (1) - Mozu Ascot (2020)
- Satsuki Shō (Japanese 2000 Guineas) - (1) - Contrail (2020)
- Japan Dirt Derby - (1) - Danon Pharaoh (2020)
- Kikuka Shō (Japanese St. Leger) - (1) - Contrail (2020)
- Japan Cup - (1) - Contrail (2021)
- Tokyo Daishōten - (1) - Forever Young (2024)

(United Arab Emirates) UAE

- Dubai Turf - (2) - Real Steel (2016), Panthalassa (2022)

Australia

- Cox Plate - (1) - Lys Gracieux (2019)

Hong Kong

- Queen Elizabeth II Cup - (1) - Loves Only You (2021)
- Hong Kong Cup - (1) - Loves Only You (2021)

United States

- Breeders' Cup Filly & Mare Turf - (1) - Loves Only You (2021)
- Breeders' Cup Distaff - (1) - Marche Lorraine (2021)
- Breeders' Cup Classic - (1) - Forever Young (2025)
- Jockey Club Gold Cup - (1) - Forever Young (2026)

Saudi Arabia

- Saudi Cup - (3) - Panthalassa (2023), Forever Young (2025, 2026)

== Bibliography ==
- Yahagi, Yoshito (2008). 開成調教師 安馬を激走に導く厩舎マネジメント. Byakuya-Shobo. ISBN 978-4-86191-476-8.

== See also ==
- Ryusei Sakai - Jockey of the Yahagi stable
