= Daring Heart =

Japanese Thoroughbred racehorse (foaled 2002)

Daring Heart; デアリングハート
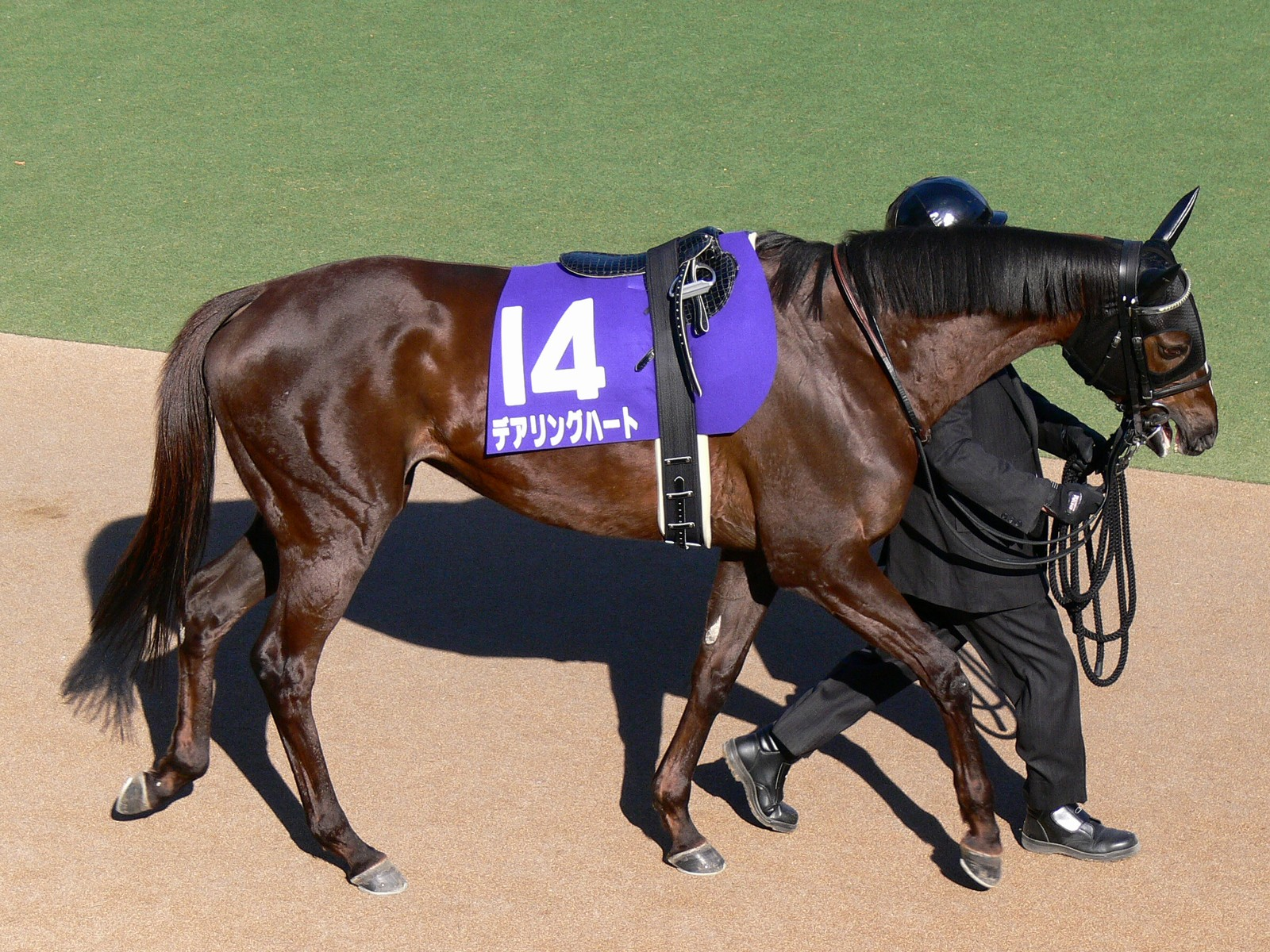
- Daring Heart at the 2008 February Stakes.
- Breed: Thoroughbred
- Sire: Sunday Silence
- Grandsire: Halo
- Dam: Daring Danzig
- Damsire: Danzig
- Sex: Mare
- Foaled: March 9, 2002 (age 24)
- Country: Japan
- Colour: Chestnut
- Breeder: Shadai Farm
- Owner: Shadai Race Horse
- Racing colours
- Trainer: Hideaki Fujiwara
- Jockey: Shinji Fujita; Koshiro Take; Hiroki Goto; Mirco Demuro; Mikio Matsunaga
- Record: 26: 4-4-4
- Earnings: ¥274,862,000

Major wins
- Queen Stakes (2006); Fuchu Himba Stakes (2006, 2007)

Daring Heart (Japanese: デアリングハート, Dearingu Hāto; foaled 9 March 2002) is a retired Japanese Thoroughbred racehorse and broodmare. She recorded four wins from twenty-six starts between 2004 and 2008, including the Queen Stakes in 2006 and the Fuchu Himba Stakes in 2006 and 2007. She placed in two Grade 1 races, finishing third in the 2005 Oka Sho and second in the 2005 NHK Mile Cup. She is the granddam of Daring Tact, the winner of the 2020 Japanese Fillies' Triple Crown. Her name means "brave heart".

== Background ==
Daring Heart is a chestnut mare foaled in Chitose, Hokkaido, by Shadai Farm. She was sired by Sunday Silence, and her dam was Daring Danzig, a mare by Danzig. She was owned by Shadai Race Horse and trained by Hideaki Fujiwara at the JRA's Ritto Training Center. Her notable stablemates at the Shadai Farm from the 2002 crop included Air Messiah, Maruka Rascal, Shadow Gate and Agnes Jedi.

== Racing career ==
=== 2004: two-year-old season ===
Daring Heart debuted on 9 October 2004 in a 2-year-old newcomer race over 1400 metres on turf at Kyoto Racecourse, finishing second behind Mayano Stardom with Koshiro Take. On 30 October, she won her maiden race over 1600 metres at Kyoto on turf by 0.4 seconds. On 5 December, she ran in the Hanshin Juvenile Fillies at Hanshin Racecourse, finishing fifth behind Shonan Peintre.

=== 2005: three-year-old season ===
She began the year with a third in the Kobai Stakes and a sixth in the Elfin Stakes at Kyoto. On 13 March, she finished second in the Fillies' Revue at Hanshin behind Rhein Kraft, earning priority entry to the Oka Sho. On 10 April, she started as the 10th favourite in the Oka Sho (GI) at Hanshin. Ridden by Mirco Demuro, she finished third, a neck behind the second-place Cesario, who in turn was beaten by Rhein Kraft by a head. On 8 May, she ran in the NHK Mile Cup at Tokyo Racecourse. Starting as the 10th favourite, she improved one place to finish second behind Rhein Kraft.

She then finished fourth in the GIII Queen Stakes, 12th in the Shuka Sho behind Air Messiah, and 15th in the Swan Stakes.

=== 2006: four-year-old season ===
Daring Heart began the year with a 12th in the Hanshin Himba Stakes and a sixth in the inaugural Victoria Mile. On 13 August, she contested the Queen Stakes at Sapporo Racecourse. Ridden by Shinji Fujita, she defeated the Grade 1 winner Yamanin Sucre to record her first graded stakes victory. On 15 October, she won the Fuchu Himba Stakes at Tokyo, recording her second consecutive graded win. She ended the year with a 13th in the Mile Championship behind Daiwa Major.

=== 2007: five-year-old season ===
She began the year with a sixth in the Lord Derby Challenge Trophy at Nakayama Racecourse. On 13 May, she finished third in the Victoria Mile at Tokyo behind Koiuta. After a ninth in the Epsom Cup and a seventh in the Queen Stakes, she won the Fuchu Himba Stakes at Tokyo on 14 October for the second consecutive year, defeating Asahi Rising. She then finished 12th in the Queen Elizabeth II Cup behind Daiwa Scarlet, and third in the Queen Sho at Funabashi Racecourse.

=== 2008: six-year-old season ===
Daring Heart began the year on 16 January in the TCK Jo-o Hai at Ohi Racecourse, finishing second behind Rapid Orange. On 24 February, she ran in the February Stakes on dirt at Tokyo, finishing seventh behind Vermilion. She was retired from racing on 28 February 2008 to become a broodmare.

== Broodmare career ==
Daring Heart retired to Shadai Farm as a broodmare. One of her foals, Daring Bird (by King Kamehameha), is the dam of Daring Tact who won the Japanese Triple Tiara in 2020. She was retired from broodmare duty on 11 November 2022.

=== Breeding record ===
c = colt, f = filly, g = gelding

No.	Name	Year	Sex	Color	Sire	Wins	Races	Remarks
1st	(Daring Heart 2009)	2009	f		Tanino Gimlet			
2nd	(Daring Heart 2010)	2010	f		King Kamehameha			
3rd	Daring Bird	2011	f	Dark Bay	King Kamehameha	0	1	Retired, broodmare
	(not foaled)	2012						
4th	Daring Edge	2013	f	Chestnut	King Kamehameha	1	18	Retired, broodmare
5th	Heart Rich	2014	c	Dark Bay	Harbinger	5	70	Retired
6th	Love Fanciful	2015	f	Bay	Harbinger	1	10	Retired, broodmare
	(unfertilized)				Lord Kanaloa			
7th	Eternal Heart	2017	f	Dark Bay	King Kamehameha	1	16	Retired, broodmare
8th	Daring Woman	2018	f	Bay	Lord Kanaloa	2	25	Retired, broodmare
	(not foaled)	2019			Lord Kanaloa			
9th	Awesome Darer	2020	g	Chestnut	Mind Your Biscuits	1	30	Active
10th	Bravery	2021	f	Chestnut	Mind Your Biscuits	0	4	Retired, broodmare
	(not foaled)	2022			Rey de Oro			
	(not foaled)	2023			Bricks and Mortar			

== In popular culture ==
An anthropomorphized version of Daring Heart appears as a character in the Japanese multimedia franchise Umamusume: Pretty Derby, voiced by Shio Kisui.

== Race record ==
The following table details all 26 starts of Daring Heart's racing career based on official JBIS and netkeiba records. Record current as of her final start on 24 February 2008.

Date	Distance (Condition)	Race	Class	Course	Odds (Favourite)	Field	Finish	Time	Jockey	Winning (Losing) Margin	Winner (2nd Place)	Ref
2004 – two-year-old season
Oct 9	Turf 1400 m (Yielding)	2-Y-O Newcomer	Maiden	Kyoto	3.4 (2nd)	10	2nd	1:24.8	Koshiro Take	0.2	Mayano Stardom	
Oct 30	Turf 1600 m (Good)	2-Y-O Maiden	Maiden	Kyoto	2.5 (1st)	14	1st	1:35.3	Koshiro Take	–0.4	(Toho Levin)	
Dec 5	Turf 1600 m (Good)	Hanshin Juvenile Fillies	GI	Hanshin	36.6 (11th)	18	5th	1:35.5	Koshiro Take	0.3	Shonan Peintre	
2005 – three-year-old season
Jan 16	Turf 1400 m (Good)	Kobai Stakes	Open	Kyoto	4.0 (2nd)	13	3rd	1:24.4	Koshiro Take	0.1	Erimo Final	
Feb 5	Turf 1600 m (Good)	Elfin Stakes	Open	Kyoto	6.0 (3rd)	12	6th	1:36.5	Koshiro Take	0.5	Air Messiah	
Mar 13	Turf 1400 m (Good)	Fillies' Revue	GII	Hanshin	28.4 (7th)	15	2nd	1:21.2	Koshiro Take	0.0	Rhein Kraft	
Apr 10	Turf 1600 m (Good)	Oka Sho	GI	Hanshin	20.0 (10th)	18	3rd	1:33.6	Mirco Demuro	0.1	Rhein Kraft	
May 8	Turf 1600 m (Good)	NHK Mile Cup	GI	Tokyo	36.6 (10th)	18	2nd	1:33.9	Hiroki Goto	0.3	Rhein Kraft	
Aug 14	Turf 1800 m (Good)	Queen Stakes	GIII	Sapporo	2.9 (1st)	14	4th	1:47.2	Hiroki Goto	0.5	Les Clefs d'Or	
Oct 16	Turf 2000 m (Good)	Shuka Sho	GI	Kyoto	20.6 (3rd)	18	12th	2:01.1	Hiroki Goto	1.9	Air Messiah	
Oct 29	Turf 1400 m (Heavy)	Swan Stakes	GII	Kyoto	7.3 (3rd)	18	15th	1:22.8	Mikio Matsunaga	1.3	Cosmo Sunbeam	
2006 – four-year-old season
Apr 8	Turf 1400 m (Good)	Hanshin Himba Stakes	GII	Hanshin	28.4 (7th)	12	12th	1:23.3	Mirco Demuro	2.1	Rhein Kraft	
May 14	Turf 1600 m (Yielding)	Victoria Mile	GI	Tokyo	82.9 (11th)	18	6th	1:34.6	Shinji Fujita	0.6	Dance in the Mood	
Jun 11	Turf 1800 m (Heavy)	Epsom Cup	GIII	Tokyo	27.2 (10th)	18	4th	1:49.5	Shinji Fujita	0.3	Top Gun Joe	
Aug 13	Turf 1800 m (Good)	Queen Stakes	GIII	Sapporo	5.1 (3rd)	14	1st	1:46.7	Shinji Fujita	–0.3	(Yamanin Sucre)	
Oct 15	Turf 1800 m (Good)	Fuchu Himba Stakes	GIII	Tokyo	4.8 (2nd)	16	1st	1:47.5	Hiroki Goto	–0.0	(Sanrei Jasper)	
Nov 19	Turf 1600 m (Good)	Mile Championship	GI	Kyoto	27.4 (7th)	18	13th	1:33.9	Shinji Fujita	1.2	Daiwa Major	
2007 – five-year-old season
Apr 1	Turf 1600 m (Good)	Lord Derby Challenge Trophy	GIII	Nakayama	11.6 (6th)	15	6th	1:33.7	Shinji Fujita	0.6	Picaresque Coat	
May 13	Turf 1600 m (Good)	Victoria Mile	JpnI	Tokyo	32.6 (8th)	18	3rd	1:32.6	Shinji Fujita	0.1	Koiuta	
Jun 10	Turf 1800 m (Yielding)	Epsom Cup	GIII	Tokyo	6.5 (3rd)	18	9th	1:49.2	Shinji Fujita	0.9	Eishin Deputy	
Aug 12	Turf 1800 m (Good)	Queen Stakes	JpnIII	Sapporo	7.1 (4th)	12	7th	1:47.2	Shinji Fujita	0.5	Asahi Rising	
Oct 14	Turf 1800 m (Good)	Fuchu Himba Stakes	GIII	Tokyo	7.8 (4th)	16	1st	1:45.4	Shinji Fujita	–0.3	(Asahi Rising)	
Nov 11	Turf 2200 m (Good)	Queen Elizabeth II Cup	GI	Kyoto	22.0 (8th)	13	12th	2:13.0	Shinji Fujita	1.1	Daiwa Scarlet	
Dec 5	Dirt 1800 m (Yielding)	Queen Sho	JpnIII	Funabashi	6.5 (4th)	14	3rd	1:52.5	Shinji Fujita	0.9	White Melody	
2008 – six-year-old season
Jan 16	Dirt 1800 m (Good)	TCK Jo-o Hai	JpnIII	Ohi	2.4 (1st)	14	2nd	1:54.3	Shinji Fujita	0.2	Rapid Orange	
Feb 24	Dirt 1600 m (Good)	February Stakes	GI	Tokyo	36.9 (10th)	16	7th	1:36.5	Shinji Fujita	1.2	Vermilion	

== Pedigree ==
Pedigree of Daring Heart (JPN)
Sire Sunday Silence (USA) 1986	Halo (USA); 1969	Hail to Reason	Turn-to
Sire Sunday Silence (USA) 1986	Halo (USA); 1969	Hail to Reason	Nothirdchance
Sire Sunday Silence (USA) 1986	Halo (USA); 1969	Cosmah	Cosmic Bomb
Sire Sunday Silence (USA) 1986	Halo (USA); 1969	Cosmah	Almahmoud
Sire Sunday Silence (USA) 1986	Wishing Well (USA); 1975	Understanding	Promised Land
Sire Sunday Silence (USA) 1986	Wishing Well (USA); 1975	Understanding	Pretty Ways
Sire Sunday Silence (USA) 1986	Wishing Well (USA); 1975	Mountain Flower	Montparnasse
Sire Sunday Silence (USA) 1986	Wishing Well (USA); 1975	Mountain Flower	Edelweiss
Dam Daring Danzig (USA) 1990	Danzig (USA); 1977	Northern Dancer	Nearctic
Dam Daring Danzig (USA) 1990	Danzig (USA); 1977	Northern Dancer	Natalma
Dam Daring Danzig (USA) 1990	Danzig (USA); 1977	Pas de Nom	Admiral's Voyage
Dam Daring Danzig (USA) 1990	Danzig (USA); 1977	Pas de Nom	Petitioner
Dam Daring Danzig (USA) 1990	Impetuous Gal (USA); 1975	Briartic	Nearctic
Dam Daring Danzig (USA) 1990	Impetuous Gal (USA); 1975	Briartic	Sweet Lady Briar
Dam Daring Danzig (USA) 1990	Impetuous Gal (USA); 1975	Impetuous Lady	Hasty Rord
Dam Daring Danzig (USA) 1990	Impetuous Gal (USA); 1975	Impetuous Lady	Escocesa

- Daring Heart is inbred 4 × 5 to Almahmoud and 4 × 4 to Nearctic (within the dam line).
- Her half-brothers Ection Park (by Forty Niner) and Pit Fighter (by Pulpit) both won graded stakes races.
