= Daring Tact =

Japanese-bred Thoroughbred racehorse

Daring Tact デアリングタクト
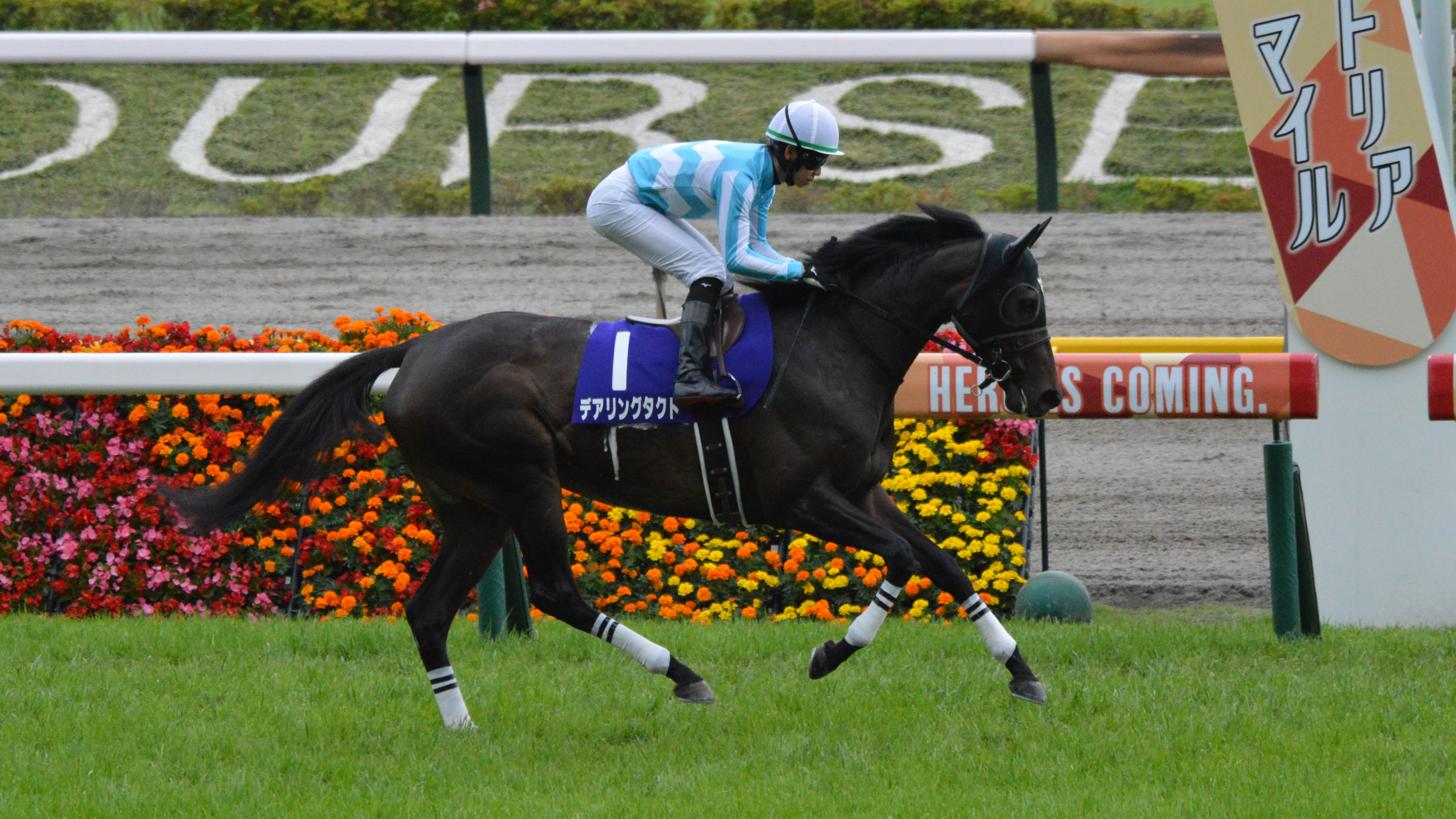
- Daring Tact racing at the 2022 Victoria Mile.
- Breed: Thoroughbred
- Sire: Epiphaneia (JPN)
- Grandsire: Symboli Kris S (USA)
- Dam: Daring Bird (JPN)
- Damsire: King Kamehameha (JPN)
- Sex: Mare
- Foaled: April 15, 2017 (age 9)
- Country: Japan
- Colour: Brown
- Breeder: Hasegawa Bokujo
- Owner: Normandy Thoroughbred Racing
- Racing colours
- Trainer: Haruki Sugiyama
- Jockey: Kohei Matsuyama
- Record: 13: 5-1-3
- Earnings: ¥644,132,400

Major wins
- Japanese Classic Tiara Race wins: Oka Sho (2020); Yushun Himba (2020); Shuka Sho (2020)

Awards
- 6th Japanese Triple Tiara Champion (2020); JRA Award for Best Three-Year-Old Filly (2020)

Daring Tact (Japanese: デアリングタクト, Hepburn: Dearingu Takuto; foaled 15 April 2017) is a retired champion Japanese Thoroughbred racehorse who became the sixth filly to win the Japanese Triple Tiara in 2020, and the first to win it whilst undefeated. After winning her only race as a two-year-old, she won the Elfin Stakes on her three-year-old debut and went on to record Grade 1 victories in the Oka Sho, Yushun Himba, and Shuka Sho to complete the Tiara's trifecta. She also came third in the 2020 Japan Cup to other Triple Crown winners Almond Eye and the then-undefeated Contrail.

== Background ==
Daring Tact is a brown mare with a small white star bred in Japan by the Hasegawa Bokujo. As a yearling in 2018 she was put up for auction at the Japan Racing Horse Association Select Sale of Yearlings and was bought for ¥12,960,000 by the Normandy Farm. She was sent into training with Haruki Sugiyama.

The first-crop daughter of 2014 Japan Cup victor Epiphaneia became the first filly in 40 years and third overall to claim the title in her third career start while she also became the first in 16 years and seventh overall undefeated filly to win the first leg.

She was from the first crop of foals sired by the 2014 Japan Cup victor Epiphaneia who also won the Kikuka Sho and was rated the second-best horse in the world in 2014. Daring Tact's dam Daring Bird showed no racing ability but was a daughter of Daring Heart who won the Queen Stakes and Fuchu Himba Stakes as well as being placed in the Oka Sho, NHK Mile Cup and Victoria Mile. Daring Heart was a daughter of the American-bred broodmare Daring Danzig, who was exported to Japan after being sold for $435,000 at Keeneland in November 1998.

== Racing career ==
=== 2019: two-year-old season ===
Daring Tact made her racecourse debut in a contest for previously unraced juveniles over 1600 metres on firm ground at Kyoto Racecourse on 16 November 2019 and won from the colt No Security.

=== 2020: three-year-old season ===
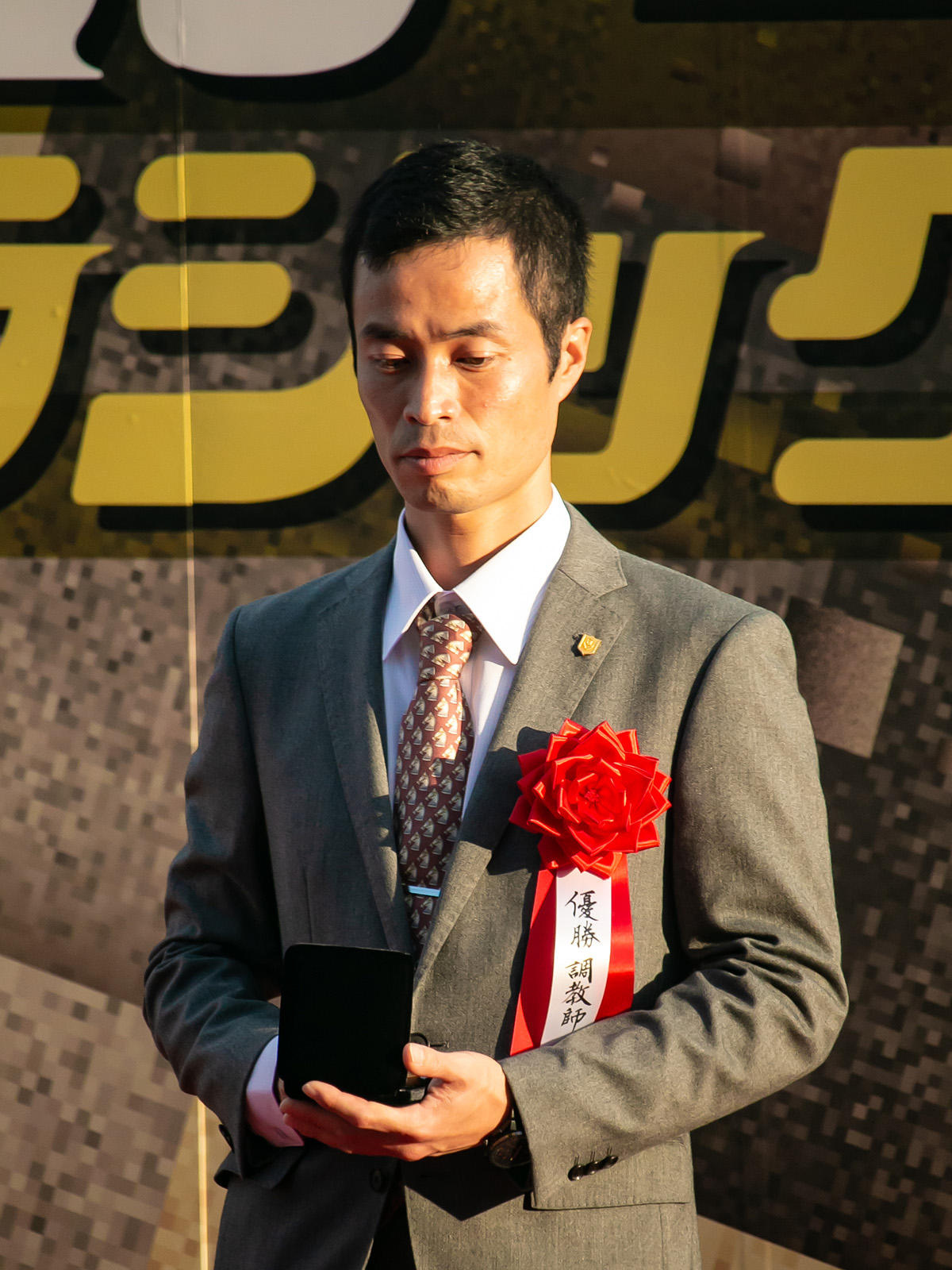
Daring Tact's trainer Haruki Sugiyama

On 8 February 2020 Daring Tact began her second campaign in the Listed Elfin Stakes over 1600 metres at Kyoto. She came from tenth place on final turn before showing "top-class acceleration" to take the lead 100 metres from the finish and drew away to win by four lengths. Her trainer Haruki Sugiyama later commented "She was agitated behind the gate and she didn’t break very well. She did settle during the trip however, and displayed a good turn of foot over the last furlong."

On 12 April at Hanshin Racecourse Daring Tact was stepped up in class to contest the 80th running of the Oka Sho over 1600 metres in which she was ridden by Kohei Matsuyama and went off the 3.2/1 second favourite behind Resistencia. The other sixteen runners included Sanctuaire (Shinzan Kinen), Ria Amelia (Artemis Stakes), Maltese Diosa (Tulip Sho), Miyamazakura (Queen Stakes), Smile Kana (Fairy Stakes), Woman's Heart (Niigata Nisai Stakes) and Epos (Fillies' Revue). In a race run in heavy rain, Daring Tact was restrained towards the rear of the field before making rapid progress on the wide outside on the final turn. She maintained her progress as the front-runners tired, overtook Resistencia inside the last 50 metres and was finishing to such effect that she won by one and a half lengths. Resistencia held on for second ahead of Smile Kana and Cravache d'Or. After the race Matsuyama said "I concentrated on her rhythm more than where to position her today. We were far behind the leaders and desperate in catching up but she responded beautifully and stretched incredibly all the way to the line."

At Tokyo Racecourse on 24 May Daring Tact was moved up in distance and started the 0.6/1 favourite for the 2400 metre Yushun Himba. Her opponents on this occasion included Des Ailes (Sweetpea Stakes), Cravache d'Or, Miyamazakura, Sanctuaire (Shinzan Kinen), Win Marilyn (Flora Stakes), Ria Amelia (Artemis Stakes), Smile Kana, Maltese Diosa, Woman's Heart and Ablaze (Flower Cup). Daring Tact started well before being settled towards the rear of the field as Smile Kana set the pace. The stablemates Win Mighty and Win Marilyn went past the early leaders in the straight and looked to have the race between then, but Daring Tact, having briefly struggled to obtain a clear run, accelerated through a narrow gap, gained the advantage in the final strides and won by half a length. Win Marilyn beat Win Mighty a neck for second with fourth place going to Ria Amelia. Matsuyama commented "we were bumped a few times, so I decided to keep her relaxed in a lower position than planned. She instantly kicked into gear once out of traffic in the straight and showed another amazing run down the middle of the lane. Her tremendous burst of speed was extraordinary. It was the first time I rode a favorite [in Grade 1 races] and I admit I felt the pressure, so I’m relieved".

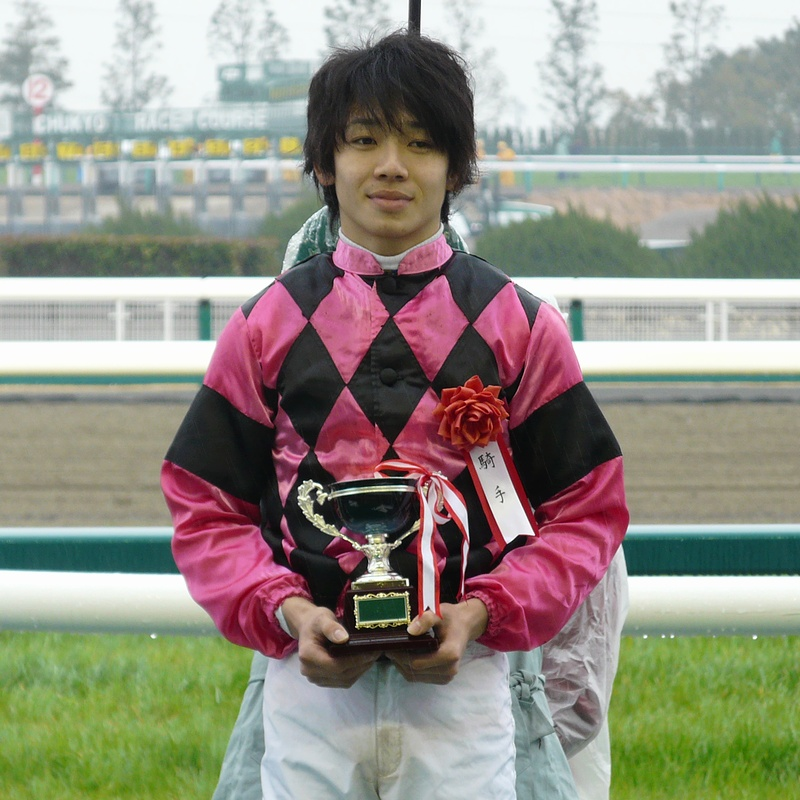
Kohei Matsuyama, who rode Daring Tact in 2020

After the summer break, Daring Tact returned to the track at Kyoto on 18 October and started 0.4/1 favourite for the Shuka Sho as she attempted to become the sixth filly to complete the Japanese Triple Tiara and the first to do so while still undefeated. The best fancied of her seventeen opponents were Ria Ameilia, Win Mighty, Maltese Diosa, Win Marilyn, Miyamazakura and Cravache d'Or. Matsuyama settled the favourite towards the rear as Maltese Diosa set a steady pace, before making a forward move approaching the final turn and swinging to the outside as the fillies entered the straight. Daring Tact gained the advantage 200 metres from the finish and won in "comfortable" style by one and a quarter lengths and three quarters of a length from the outsiders Magic Castle and Soft Fruit. After the race Matsuyama said "The filly seemed a bit nervous at the paddock but she broke well and we were able to race in good position and in good rhythm. There was some pressure as we were aiming for the first undefeated Triple Crown filly in JRA history but I'm delighted to be able to accomplish this remarkable feat. I want to thank the filly and offer her my congratulations. She has developed into a bold filly and I hope that she will remain undefeated."

On November 29, Daring Tact was matched against older horses for the first time when she started third favourite for the 40th edition of the Japan Cup over 2400 metres at Tokyo. She settled in seventh place before staying on strongly in the straight but sustained her first defeat as she came home third behind Almond Eye and Contrail while the other beaten runners included Glory Vase, World Premiere, Kiseki and Makahiki. Matsuyama commented "I think it was a good run to finish not far behind such strong horses, and I expect her to mature."

In January 2021, Daring Tact was unanimously voted Best Three-Year-Old Filly at the JRA Awards for 2020. In the 2020 World's Best Racehorse Rankings, Daring Tact was rated on 119, making her the equal 57th best racehorse in the world.

=== 2021: four-year-old season ===
The team announced that Daring Tact will join the Queen Elizabeth II Cup in Sha Tin Racecourse on April 25th. Before that race, Daring Tact participated in Kinko Sho at Chukyo Racecourse to acclimate her on colder temperature and the left-handed racecourse. She started from the first gate, running in sixth place throughout the race and made a move to the outside in the straight to close the gap, but was unable to catch the leading horse, Gibeon and finished second.

In Hong Kong, She had a good start and maintained her pace in third place for the majority but losing pace in the final straight and finished third behind two other Japanese horses, Loves Only You and Glory Vase. The fourth place in that race was Kiseki, making it a top four sweep finishes for Japanese horses. After this race, she was scheduled to race in Takarazuka Kinen but it was cancelled as Daring Tact suffered a right fore leg injury which sidelined her for at least nine months, making her out for the season.

=== 2022: five-year-old season ===
The plan for new season was for Daring Tact to return in Victoria Mile and try to shoot up a spot in Takarazuka Kinen. On May 15th, the race began and she chased mostly in the inside pack and secured the inside in the final stretch but failed to make it count and finished sixth on the day. On the promised day of Takarazuka Kinen, Sugiyama noted that the mile race she ran after her comeback was very tough on her due to her injuries and poor track conditions but she did well despite all of the circumstances that happened. When the race started, Daring Tact mingled mostly in tenth position behind Efforia before making a headway at 1000 metres mark, unleashing a late spurt and securing a third place finish with just a nose in front of Deep Bond.

Then, she ran in Sankei Sho All Comers. In this race, She failed to maintain her pace or secure a good position until the third corner and surpassed by Geraldina in the final stage to finish sixth. This race was a preparation for her next race in Queen Elizabeth II Cup in Hanshin. Sugiyama commented that her training was well conducted and her previous performance was good but still hoping for improvements in this race. The weather on that day did not favour her again as it was rainy and the track was heavy. Despite that, she made a good start and running smoothly in the middle phase which was good enough to take the lead momentarily. In the final phase, she dropped her momentum and finished sixth again for second consecutive races. Matsuyama apologized for a bad performance and claimed that Daring Tact had run as fast as she could on that day.

Her final race of the season will be the Japan Cup in which she was ridden by new foreign short-term license jockey, Tom Marquand. However, she could not exert her usual stretch acceleration as the pace is slower and it was a jam-packed herd near the finish line but still manage to place fourth behind Vela Azul (the winner), Shahryar and Weltreisende. Marquand quoted after the race saying that the pack does not open the spaces for most horses but he acknowledged Daring Tact's ability to weave through and escape the blockade during the race.

=== 2023: six-year-old season ===
It was announced that Daring Tact will continue to race in 2023. She was selected to join a Saudi Arabian's G3 races, Neom Turf Cup but the plan was halted due to the irregularities on her left front gait. She was supposed to be in recovery phase until the autumn campaign starts but after training on the 5th of October, she was found to be lame. X-rays and ultrasound scans revealed swelling and pain on palpation from the attachment of the suspensory ligament in her right forelimb to her body. This is recurring injury as she was sidelined with this after her third place finish in the Queen Elizabeth II Cup, two years prior. Following a deep discussion with the veterinarians, The Normandy Thoroughbred Racing decided to retire her on 6th of October due to this injury. On October 12, her registration as a racehorse was officially terminated.

== Breeding career ==
In October 2023, Daring Tact retired from racing to become a broodmare at Okada Stud in Shinhidaka, Hokkaido. She gave a birth to the first foal on March 8, 2025.

c = colt

No.	Name	Foaled	Sex	Color	Sire	Races	Wins	Remarks
1st	(Daring Tact 2025)	2025	c	Chestnut	Benbatl			
2nd	(Daring Tact 2026)	2026	c	Brown	Equinox			

== In popular culture ==
An anthropomorphized version of Daring Tact appears as a character in the Japanese multimedia franchise Umamusume: Pretty Derby, voiced by Hina Yōmiya. She is depicted as a headstrong girl who enjoys living in the wilderness, alluding to her real-life counterpart being raised in the Erimo Branch Farm in Shinhidaka, Hokkaido, known for its harsh natural conditions. She has a fondness for bears and finds them cute, though they fear her and often run away from her while she chases them to give them hugs, referencing an incident where the real-world Daring Tact chased away one attacking her farm. As her real-world counterpart's races took place during the COVID-19 pandemic, it is reflected within her career mode as characters wearing face masks and contracting COVID-19 themselves, the spectator stands being empty when running in the Triple Tiara races, and no concerts available after races. Her addition to the game was unprecedented as, at the time of her announcement to the game, she was still an active racehorse. As of the series' fifth anniversary, she has four consecutive generations of her pedigree appearing in the franchise – Daring Tact, her sire Epiphaneia, Epiphaneia's dam Cesario, and Cesario's sire Special Week – the longest consecutive pedigree of any horse represented at the time.

== Racing form ==
Below data is based on data available on JBIS Search and netkeiba.com.

Date	Age	Track	Race	Grade	Distance (Condition)	Entry	HN	Odds (Favored)	Finish	Time	Margins	Jockey	Winner (Runner-up)
Nov 16, 2019	2	Kyoto	2yo Newcomer		1,600 m (Firm)	11	3	4.8 (2)	1st	1:37.7	–0.2	Kohei Matsuyama	(No Security)
Feb 8, 2020	3	Kyoto	Elfin Stakes	L	1,600 m (Firm)	12	8	4.8 (3)	1st	1:33.6	–0.7	Kohei Matsuyama	(Wrightia)
Apr 12, 2020	3	Hanshin	Oka Sho	1	1,600 m (Soft)	18	9	4.2 (2)	1st	1:36.1	–0.2	Kohei Matsuyama	(Resistencia)
May 24, 2020	3	Tokyo	Yushun Himba	1	2,400 m (Firm)	18	4	1.6 (1)	1st	2:24.4	–0.1	Kohei Matsuyama	(Win Marilyn)
Oct 18, 2020	3	Kyoto	Shuka Sho	1	2,000 m (Good)	18	13	1.4 (1)	1st	2:00.6	–0.2	Kohei Matsuyama	(Magic Castle)
Nov 29, 2020	3	Tokyo	Japan Cup	1	2,400 m (Firm)	15	5	3.7 (3)	3rd	2:23.2	0.2	Kohei Matsuyama	Almond Eye
Mar 14, 2021	4	Chukyo	Kinko Sho	2	2,000 m (Soft)	10	1	1.4 (1)	2nd	2:01.8	0.0	Kohei Matsuyama	Gibeon
Apr 25, 2021	4	Sha Tin	Queen Elizabeth II Cup	1	2,000 m (Soft)	7	6	1.7 (1)	3rd	2:01.4	0.2	Kohei Matsuyama	Loves Only You
May 15, 2022	5	Tokyo	Victoria Mile	1	1,600 m (Firm)	18	1	8.4 (5)	6th	1:32.7	0.5	Kohei Matsuyama	Sodashi
Jun 26, 2022	5	Hanshin	Takarazuka Kinen	1	2,200 m (Firm)	17	7	7.3 (4)	3rd	2:10.3	0.6	Kohei Matsuyama	Titleholder
Sep 25, 2022	5	Nakayama	Sankei Sho All Comers	2	2,200 m (Firm)	13	8	2.0 (1)	6th	2:13.7	1.0	Kohei Matsuyama	Geraldina
Nov 13, 2022	5	Hanshin	Queen Elizabeth II Cup	1	2,200 m (Soft)	18	4	4.3 (1)	6th	2:14.0	1.0	Kohei Matsuyama	Geraldina
Nov 27, 2022	5	Tokyo	Japan Cup	1	2,400 m (Firm)	18	8	13.0 (5)	4th	2:23.9	0.2	Tom Marquand	Vela Azul

Legend:
Turf

== Pedigree ==
Pedigree of Daring Tact (JPN), brown mare, 2017
Sire Epiphaneia (JPN) 2010	Symboli Kris S (USA); 1999	Kris S	Roberto
Sire Epiphaneia (JPN) 2010	Symboli Kris S (USA); 1999	Kris S	Sharp Queen
Sire Epiphaneia (JPN) 2010	Symboli Kris S (USA); 1999	Tee Kay	Gold Meridian
Sire Epiphaneia (JPN) 2010	Symboli Kris S (USA); 1999	Tee Kay	Tri Argo
Sire Epiphaneia (JPN) 2010	Cesario (JPN); 2002	Special Week	Sunday Silence (USA)
Sire Epiphaneia (JPN) 2010	Cesario (JPN); 2002	Special Week	Campaign Girl
Sire Epiphaneia (JPN) 2010	Cesario (JPN); 2002	Kirov Premiere (GB)	Sadler's Wells (USA)
Sire Epiphaneia (JPN) 2010	Cesario (JPN); 2002	Kirov Premiere (GB)	Querida (IRE)
Dam Daring Bird (JPN) 2011	King Kamehameha (JPN); 2001	Kingmambo (USA)	Mr. Prospector
Dam Daring Bird (JPN) 2011	King Kamehameha (JPN); 2001	Kingmambo (USA)	Miesque
Dam Daring Bird (JPN) 2011	King Kamehameha (JPN); 2001	Manfath (IRE)	Last Tycoon
Dam Daring Bird (JPN) 2011	King Kamehameha (JPN); 2001	Manfath (IRE)	Pilot Bird (GB)
Dam Daring Bird (JPN) 2011	Daring Heart (JPN); 2002	Sunday Silence (USA)	Halo
Dam Daring Bird (JPN) 2011	Daring Heart (JPN); 2002	Sunday Silence (USA)	Wishing Well
Dam Daring Bird (JPN) 2011	Daring Heart (JPN); 2002	Daring Danzig (USA)	Danzig
Dam Daring Bird (JPN) 2011	Daring Heart (JPN); 2002	Daring Danzig (USA)	Impetuous Gal (CAN) (Family: 1-l)

- Daring Tact was inbred 3 × 4 to Sunday Silence, meaning that this stallion appears in both the third and fourth generations of her pedigree.
