= Air Messiah =

Japanese Thoroughbred racehorse

Air Messiah エアメサイア
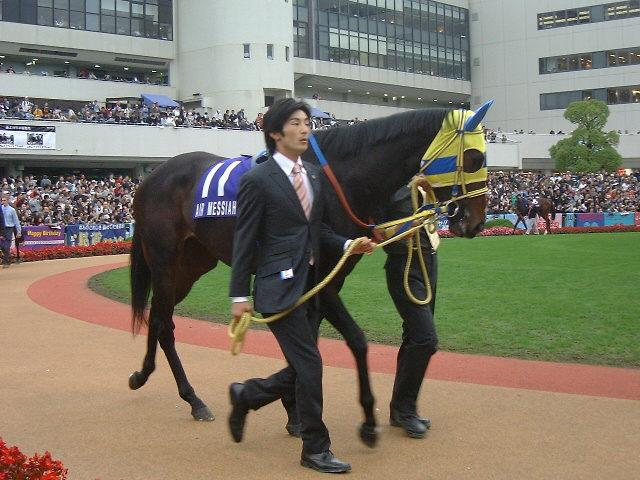
- Air Messiah at the paddock of the 2005 Queen Elizabeth II Cup.
- Breed: Thoroughbred
- Sire: Sunday Silence
- Grandsire: Halo
- Dam: Air Deja Vu
- Damsire: Northern Taste
- Sex: Mare
- Foaled: February 4, 2002
- Died: September 12, 2014 (aged 12)
- Country: Japan
- Colour: Bay
- Breeder: Shadai Farm
- Owner: Lucky Field Co., Ltd.
- Racing colours
- Trainer: Yuji Ito
- Jockey: Yutaka Take
- Record: 12: 4-4-2
- Earnings: ¥335,538,000

Major wins
- Rose Stakes (2005); Japanese Classic Tiara Race wins: Shuka Sho (2005)

Air Messiah (Japanese: エアメサイア, Hepburn: Ea Mesaia; 4 February 2002 – 12 September 2014) was a Japanese Thoroughbred racehorse and a broodmare. Her major wins include the Rose Stakes and Shuka Sho, both in 2005. Her name comes from the crown name Air, and Messiah, which means saviour in English.

== Racing career ==
She raced only once in 2004, winning her debut race. The next year, she placed second in Shiraume Sho and won the Elfin Stakes. Then, she went onto the Fillies' Revue, a major trial race for the Oka Sho, over 1400 metres at Hanshin on 19 February. She battled mostly with the eventual winner, Rhein Kraft and finished in third, a neck behind her. She also lost to Rhein Kraft in the Oka Sho, where she ineffectively tried to run on the outside track, but failed to catch up and ended up in fourth place. The next month in the Yushun Himba, she ran closely to the lead, but lost to Cesario by a neck. In the autumn campaign, she opened this section with a comfortable win in the Rose Stakes over Rhein Kraft when she overtook her just before the finish line. She repeated this feat again in the Shuka Sho wherein she chased the middle of the pack throughout the race, then took the lead early in the straight and won by a neck ahead of Rhein Kraft. She finished her season with a fifth-place finish in the Queen Elizabeth II Cup, ended the winning streak of Yutaka Take in this competition.

The next season, she started her year early in the Nakayama Kinen. Balance of Game ran out early in that race and won it by five lengths over Daiwa Major, whilst Air Messiah herself ended up in third place, one and three quarters length behind him. She had another battle with Rhein Kraft in the Hanshin Himba Stakes in which she lost by a neck to the line. In the inaugurated race of Victoria Mile, she ran mostly at the back and chased at the end of the race but just a bit short of Dance in The Mood and finished second, one and a quarter length behind. Air Messiah suffered an ingrown nail injury after the race, sidelining for the rest of the year. Her condition never improved, and she had to be retired on 28 February 2007.

== Broodmare career and death ==
She began broodmare duties at Shadai Farm in 2007, and foaled her first progeny in a following year. Her fourth progeny, Air Spinel, had a good career when he won three graded races (Kyoto Kimpai, Fuji Stakes and Daily Hai Nisai Stakes), whilst her final foal, Air Windsor, was the winner of the Challenge Cup. She died in an accident whilst grazing around on 12 September 2014.

c = colt, f = filly

No.	Name	Foaled	Sex	Color	Sire	Races	Wins	Major Wins	Remarks
1st	Air One Piece	2008	f	Chestnut	Rock of Gibraltar	13	4		Retired, broodmare
	(infertility)	2009			King Kamehameha				
2nd	Air Muscat	2010	f	Dark bay	Jungle Pocket	1	0		Retired, broodmare
3rd	Air Cuppage	2011	c	Bay	King Kamehameha	22	3		Retired
4th	Air Spinel	2013	c	Chestnut	King Kamehameha	31	4	Kyoto Kimpai, Fuji Stakes, Daily Hai Nisai Stakes	Retired, riding horse
5th	Air Windsor	2014	g	Dark bay	King Kamehameha	25	7	Challenge Cup	Retired, riding horse

== In popular culture ==
An anthropomorphized version of Air Messiah appears as a character in the Japanese multimedia franchise Umamusume: Pretty Derby, voiced by Yuna Nemoto. She is depicted as a steadfast, honest, and hardworking yet highly insecure girl who dreams of winning the Japanese Triple Tiara in honor of her mother, who fell just short of winning it as a runner-up during her racing career. She shares a close friendship and rivalry with her classmates Rhein Kraft, Cesario, and Daring Heart.

== Racing form ==
Air Messiah won four races and placed in another six out of 12 starts. All the data available is based on JBIS and Netkeiba.

Date	Track	Race	Grade	Distance (Condition)	Entry	HN	Odds (Favored)	Finish	Time	Margins	Jockey	Winner (Runner-up)
2004 – two-year-old season
Nov 16	Kyoto	2yo Newcomer		1,600 m (Firm)	15	5	1.4 (1)	1st	1:38.0	–0.2	Yutaka Take	(Bubble Fantasy)
2005 – three-year-old season
Jan 15	Kyoto	Shiraume Sho	ALW (1W)	1,600 m (Firm)	13	9	4.5 (2)	2nd	1:36.8	0.3	Yutaka Take	Dia de la Novia
Feb 5	Kyoto	Elfin Stakes	OP	1,600 m (Firm)	12	6	4.9 (2)	1st	1:36.0	0.0	Yutaka Take	(Judeite)
Mar 13	Hanshin	Fillies' Revue	2	1,400 m (Firm)	15	10	5.3 (3)	3rd	1:21.3	0.1	Yutaka Take	Rhein Kraft
Apr 10	Hanshin	Oka Sho	1	1,600 m (Firm)	18	15	6.5 (3)	4th	1:33.9	0.4	Yutaka Take	Rhein Kraft
May 22	Tokyo	Yushun Himba	1	2,400 m (Firm)	18	5	8.6 (2)	2nd	2:28.8	0.0	Yutaka Take	Cesario
Sep 18	Hanshin	Rose Stakes	2	2,000 m (Firm)	15	9	2.4 (2)	1st	2:00.1	–0.1	Yutaka Take	(Rhein Kraft)
Oct 16	Kyoto	Shuka Sho	1	2,000 m (Firm)	18	10	2.5 (2)	1st	1:59.2	0.0	Yutaka Take	(Rhein Kraft)
Nov 13	Hanshin	Queen Elizabeth II Cup	1	2,200 m (Firm)	18	11	2.5 (1)	5th	2:13.2	0.7	Yutaka Take	Sweep Tosho
2006 – four-year-old season
Feb 26	Nakayama	Nakayama Kinen	2	1,800 m (Soft)	12	12	8.2 (4)	3rd	1:50.0	1.1	Yutaka Take	Balance of Game
Apr 8	Hanshin	Hanshin Himba Stakes	2	1,400 m (Firm)	12	12	3.3 (2)	2nd	1:21.7	0.5	Yutaka Take	Rhein Kraft
May 14	Tokyo	Victoria Mile	1	1,600 m (Good)	18	18	5.4 (3)	2nd	1:34.2	0.2	Yutaka Take	Dance in the Mood

Legend:
Turf

== Pedigree ==
Pedigree of Air Messiah (JPN), bay mare, 2002
Sire Sunday Silence (USA) 1986	Halo (USA); 1969	Hail to Reason	Turn-to
Sire Sunday Silence (USA) 1986	Halo (USA); 1969	Hail to Reason	Nothirdchance
Sire Sunday Silence (USA) 1986	Halo (USA); 1969	Cosmah	Cosmic Bomb
Sire Sunday Silence (USA) 1986	Halo (USA); 1969	Cosmah	Almahmoud
Sire Sunday Silence (USA) 1986	Wishing Well (USA); 1975	Understanding	Promised Land
Sire Sunday Silence (USA) 1986	Wishing Well (USA); 1975	Understanding	Pretty Ways
Sire Sunday Silence (USA) 1986	Wishing Well (USA); 1975	Mountain Flower	Montparnasse
Sire Sunday Silence (USA) 1986	Wishing Well (USA); 1975	Mountain Flower	Edelweiss
Dam Air Deja Vu (JPN) 1995	Northern Taste (CAN); 1971	Northern Dancer	Nearctic
Dam Air Deja Vu (JPN) 1995	Northern Taste (CAN); 1971	Northern Dancer	Natalma
Dam Air Deja Vu (JPN) 1995	Northern Taste (CAN); 1971	Lady Victoria	Victoria Park
Dam Air Deja Vu (JPN) 1995	Northern Taste (CAN); 1971	Lady Victoria	Lady Angela
Dam Air Deja Vu (JPN) 1995	I Dreamed a Dream (USA); 1987	Well Decorated	Raja Baba
Dam Air Deja Vu (JPN) 1995	I Dreamed a Dream (USA); 1987	Well Decorated	Paris Breeze
Dam Air Deja Vu (JPN) 1995	I Dreamed a Dream (USA); 1987	Hidden Trail	Gleaming
Dam Air Deja Vu (JPN) 1995	I Dreamed a Dream (USA); 1987	Hidden Trail	Tobacco Trail (Family:4-r)

- Air Messiah was an inbred by 4 x 5 to Almahmoud (Natalma's dam) and by 5 x 4 to Lady Angela (Nearctic's dam)
- Air Messiah's dam, Air Deja Vu, is the half-sister of Air Shakur
