= Dance in the Mood =

Japanese Thoroughbred racehorse

Dance in the Mood ダンスインザムード
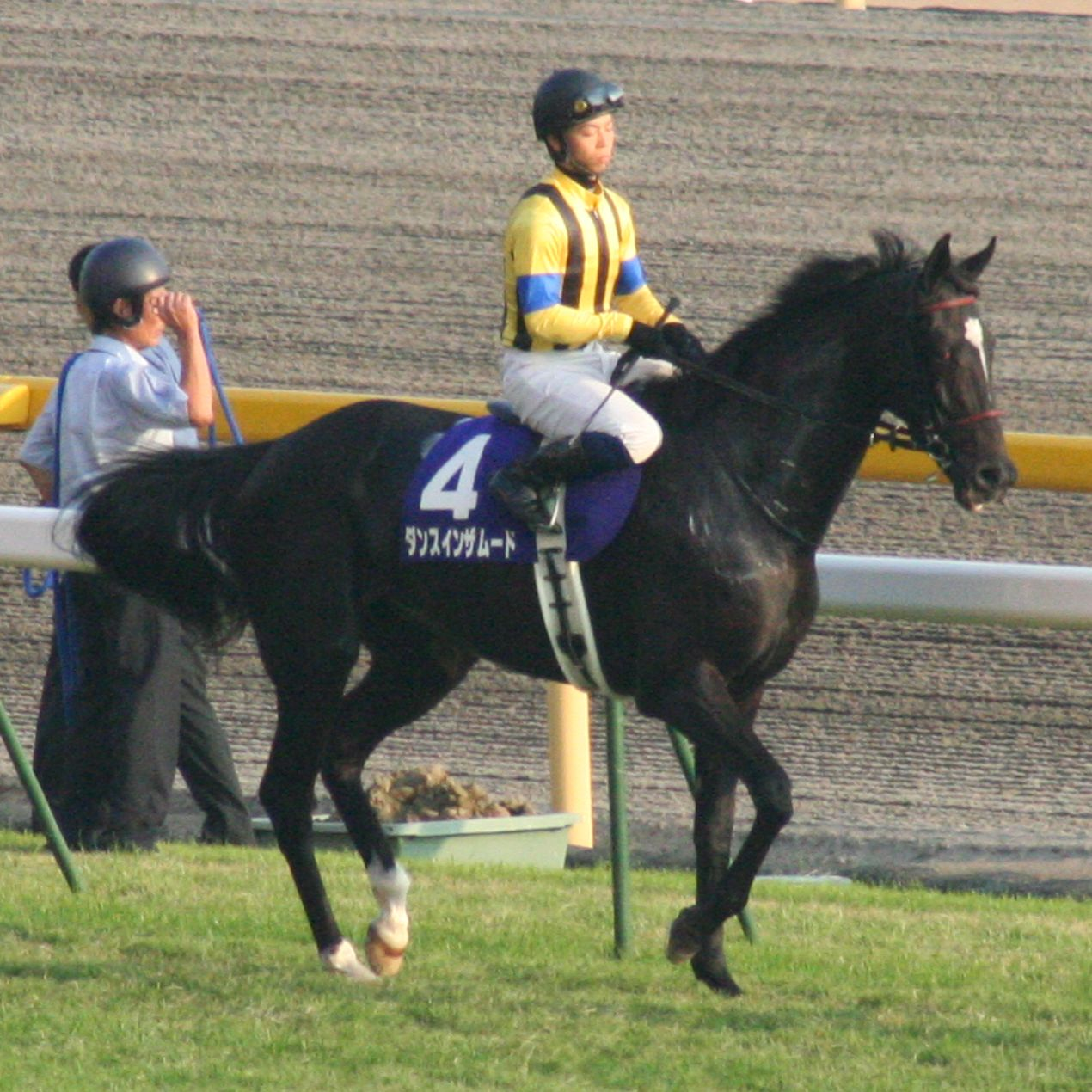
- Dance in the Mood in the 2006 Tenno Sho (Autumn)
- Sire: Sunday Silence
- Grandsire: Halo
- Dam: Dancing Key
- Damsire: Nijinsky II
- Sex: Mare
- Foaled: April 10, 2001
- Died: January 19, 2026 (aged 24)
- Country: Japan
- Colour: Dark Bay
- Breeder: Shadai Farm
- Owner: Shadai Race Horse Co. Ltd
- Racing colours
- Trainer: Kazuo Fujisawa
- Jockey: Yutaka Take; Hiroshi Kitamura
- Record: 25: 6-6-1
- Earnings: 602,018,700 JPY; JPN: 538,878,000 JPY; USA: 550,000 USD

Major wins
- Flower Cup (2004); Victoria Mile (2006); CashCall Mile Stakes (2006); Japanese Classic Tiara Race wins: Oka Shō (2004)

Awards
- JRA Award for Best Three-Year-Old Filly (2004); JRA Award for Best Older Filly or Mare (2006)

Dance in the Mood (Japanese: ダンスインザムード, Hepburn: Dansu in za Mūdo; April 10, 2001 – January 19, 2026) was a Japanese Thoroughbred racehorse and broodmare who won the Oka Shō in 2004, placed second in the American Oaks and won the JRA Award for Best Three-Year-Old Filly. She also won the 2006 Victoria Mile and won the JRA Award for Best Older Filly or Mare.

== Background ==
Dance in the Mood was a dark bay mare bred by Shadai Farm. She was from the 10th crop of foals sired by the 1989 Kentucky Derby, Preakness Stakes, and Breeders' Cup Classic winner Sunday Silence. Her dam, Dancing Key, is an outstanding mare by the 1970 English Triple Crown winner Nijinsky. Her foals include the 1996 Kikuka Sho winner Dance in the Dark, and Dance Partner, the winner of the 1995 Yushun Himba, and the 1996 Queen Elizabeth II Commemorative Cup. Dance in the Mood was a full sibling of both.

Her trainer, Kazuo Fujisawa, was exceptionally successful. Having produced three Japanese of the Year winners: Taiki Shuttle (1998), Symboli Kris S (2002, 2003), and Zenno Rob Roy (2004). But despite that, he was unable to win a classic race for 15 years until he won the Oka Shō with Dance in the Mood in 2004.

She is also the first-ever winner of the Victoria Mile since its inauguration in 2006.

== Racing career ==
=== 2003: two-year-old season ===
She made her debut in a mile race at the Nakayama Racecourse. Ridden by Olivier Peslier, she got off to a good start, led from the front, and won by a landslide, finishing 6 lengths ahead of the rest of the field.

=== 2004: three-year-old season ===
At the end of January, she joined the Wakatake Sho. Alongside Yukio Okabe, the horse who stayed mostly in the second position, pulled away from the rest of the competitors just before the finish line to win in the fastest time for the three-year-old in that year. Two months later, Dance in the Mood participated in the Oka Shō trial race, the Flower Cup with Yutaka Take in the saddle on the day. Along the race, she maintained her second position and took the lead at the final straight to win at the line by one and a quarter lengths over Yamanin Alabaster. This race qualified her for the Oka Shō in April. It was suggested that the race would be a battle between Move of Sunday, Sweep Tosho and herself. When the race began, Take rode her in the middle of the pack in the early phase. Reaching the fourth corner, the horse moved up the order and maintained her lead to win by two lengths over the seventh favourite, Azuma Sanders. For the second leg of the classic tiara race which was the Yushun Himba, Dance in the Mood would start from gate 5. Out of the gate, the horse tried to break early, but she veered side to side at the final straight and, unable to extend her lead, ended up in fourth place.

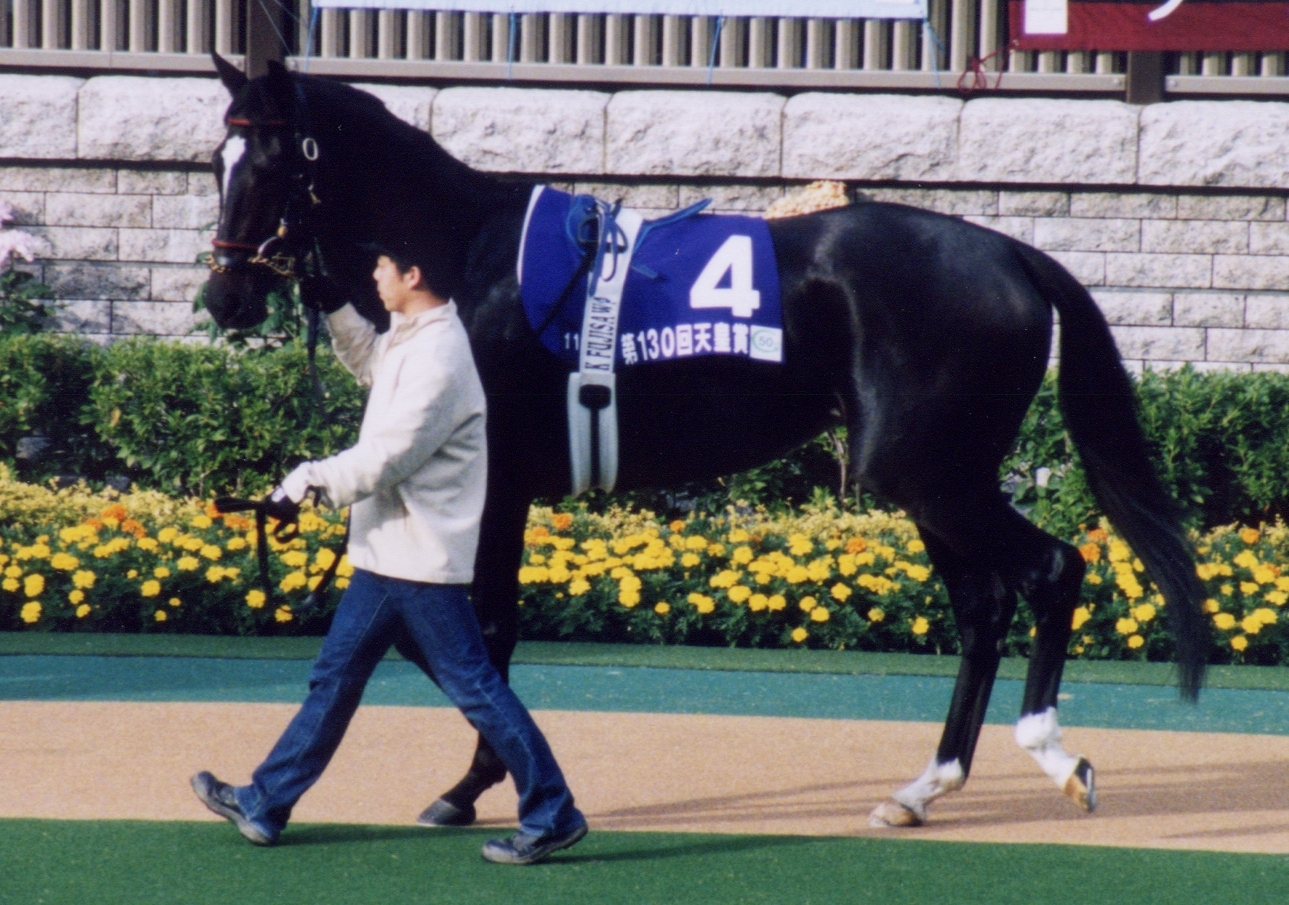
Dance in the Mood at the 2004 Tenno Sho (Autumn)

There was a proposal for her to compete at the Prix Jacques Le Marois in August before she was pivoted to the American Oaks instead. Early on, she ran well to get into the position for a final phase. Unfortunately, she was covered on the inside. She struggled to take the lead in the homestretch but somehow still finished in second place one length behind the winner, Ticker Tape. She returned to Japan to complete the final leg of the classic tiara, Shuka Sho. In this race, Take rode her to the front group early, and she tracked it well along the way. She tried to pull away after the third turn, failed to extend against her competitors after entering the straight, and finished fourth. The race turned out to be puzzling for Take, as he could not figure out why she was unable to accelerate in the end. Right after this race, her trainer, Fujisawa, sent her straight into the senior campaign, in which her first race would be the Tenno Sho (Autumn). Her jockey this time would be Christophe Lemaire. As usual, Dance in the Mood moved on for the early lead but soon no matched for Zenno Rob Roy, as he surpassed her to win the race by one and a quarter lengths ahead, whilst she finished in second. In November, she ran in the Mile Championship at Kyoto and started from gate 15, an outside gate. In this race, Lemaire positioned her in the middle pack before taking the lead towards the end. Meanwhile, Durandal, who had been tracked at the second-to-last position, moved to the far outside and outran all of the competition, overtook Dance in the Mood before the line to win by two lengths. Her back to back second place finish made her to be selected for the Hong Kong Cup in December. On the day, the horse gradually made ground in a slow-paced race, briefly took the lead after the fourth corner, lost all momentum halfway through the straight, fell down the order, and finished 13th. Due to her excellent performance for this season, she was awarded as the best three-year-old filly of the year by JRA.

=== 2005: four-year-old season ===
Dance in the Mood started the season pretty late this time, entering the Keio Hai Spring Cup in May. She performed badly this time around as she finished in ninth behind the winner, Asakusa Den'en. Her second race for the year would be the Yasuda Kinen at Tokyo. On race day, Dance in the Mood and Balance of Game made their bid early on the front, but she gassed out and dropped the pace massively to finish last in 18th place. Her bad form continued through summer as she finished in eighth place at the Queen Stakes and 12th at the Sapporo Kinen.

In the autumn, she started the second half of the season at the Fuchu Himba Stakes in August. This time around, his latest jockey, Hiroshi Kitamura, decided to calm her down at the back, contrary to her usual front-running style. She made a good surge at the end and finished in eighth place behind Yamanin Alabaster. Then, she joined the Tenno Sho (Autumn) for a second time. At the start, Dance in the Mood placed herself in fifth position. Entering the final straight, Kitamura dragged the horse inside and took the lead for a while before Zenno Rob Roy tagged her down and overtook the lead from the outside track. Before the finishing line, Heavenly Romance took the inside lane and surpassed both of them to win the race by a head over Zenno Rob Roy whilst Dance in the Mood finished third. She would end this season with a run at the Mile Championship, sticking with Hiroshi Kitamura as her jockey. In this race, Kitamura positioned the horse excellently before trying to pull off a lead at the end alongside Daiwa Major. In the end, they were caught by surging Rhein Kraft from the middle and the eventual winner, Hat Trick, from inside. The four of them had an intense drag race in which Dance in the Mood finished in fourth place at the line. Kitamura said she got a good start and good temperament in the race, noting on her maturity as a race horse.

=== 2006: five-year-old season ===
In this new season, the horse launched her season with a run at the Yomiuri Milers Cup in April. This time, Take made his comeback to ride this horse. On a slightly heavy track for the day, Dance in the Mood was closing in to the front at the end but only managed to finish in second place, three-quarters of a length behind the winner, Daiwa Major. A month later, a new mile competition was created exclusively for fillies and mares at the Tokyo Racecourse. This race was called the Victoria Mile which Dance in the Mood would be participated alongside the likes of Rhein Kraft, Air Messiah and Yamanin Alabaster. Kitamura, who returned as her jockey for this race, controlled her well in the middle of the pack throughout the race. Then, he propelled her to move inside and burst forward to take the lead at the straight. She maintained the lead and won the race by one and a quarter lengths over the second-place finisher, Air Messiah. This was her first win in two years and Kitamura's first GI title ever. Kitamura, who was overjoyed, felt grateful on the horse and thankful that he was able to repay Fujisawa's belief in him despite his own incompetence. She would close the first half of her season with a run at the Yasuda Kinen, with a future proposal for another overseas campaign in the summer. The race happened, and the winner was Bullish Luck, a Hong Kong-based horse to win this race since Fairy King Prawn did in 2000. He won the race by two and a half lengths over Asakusa Den'en whilst Dance in the Mood herself finished in respectable fifth place.

Fujisawa sent Dance in the Mood for another trip to America, once again, alongside Asahi Rising. She was sent to compete in the CashCall Mile Stakes, a GIII race at the Hollywood Park. The jockey assigned for her this time would be Victor Espinoza, a Mexican-born, American-based jockey. The strategy of using a locally based jockey this time worked out, as the horse won the race in a new record time. Fujisawa commented after her first overseas win, "The horse seemed to have plenty of energy left, so I decided to enter her in the race. The key to her victory was the significant mental growth she's undergone in the two years since her second-place finish in the American Oaks. I'm truly happy to have won with a Sunday Silence offspring in America. Next, we'll aim for the Autumn Tenno Sho." She returned home and prepared for the Mainichi Okan, a GII race before challenging the Tenno Sho (Autumn) for the third time. In the race, the horse got the lead early at the final straight but surpassed by Daiwa Major just before the line. She finished in second place by a neck. A few weeks later, her third attempt for the Tenno Sho was unsuccessful as she finished in sixth place behind the same horse who beat her at the Mainichi Okan, Daiwa Major. In November, she entered the Mile Championship, also for a third attempt. In this race, Take once again would return as her jockey. This race was meant to be another battle between her and Daiwa Major as they battled out, with Daiwa Major tracked on the inside whilst Dance in the Mood took the outside track for her bid. Daiwa Major won the race by a neck ahead of Dance in the Mood in second place. This occurrence signified that she lost to the same horse for three races in a row. At the end of the year, Fujisawa decided that Dance in the Mood would race in the Hong Kong Mile on December. On the day, she raced from the back as the gates opened. She tried to improve her position as the race went, but she lacked acceleration and speed on the day, finishing 12th by six and three quarters length behind the winner, The Duke. Take commented after the race, saying that the horse did not give a good response once he gave the signal to accelerate, despite her good pace beforehand. She did get a parting gift as the JRA awarded her the best older filly and mare of the year.

== Race record ==
Dance in the Mood won 6 of 25 entries, including one overseas win. Placed second six times, and third place once. This data is available is netkeiba, JBIS, and Equibase.

Date	Racecourse	Race	Grade	Distance (Condition)	Entry	HN	Odds (Favoured)	Finish	Time	Margin	Jockey	Winner (Runner-up)
2003 – two-year-old season
20 Dec	Nakayama	2yo newcomer		1600m (Firm)	16	2	1.3 (1)	1st	1:36.0	6 lengths	Olivier Peslier	(Jolly Dance)
2004 – three-year-old season
25 Jan	Nakayama	Wakatake Sho	ALW (1W)	1600m (Firm)	12	3	1.2 (1)	1st	1:34.3	3/4 length	Yukio Okabe	(Twinkle Veil)
20 Mar	Nakayama	Flower Cup	G3	1800m (Soft)	15	10	1.2 (1)	1st	1:50.9	1 1/4 lengths	Yutaka Take	(Yamanin Alabaster)
11 Apr	Hanshin	Oka Shō	G1	1600m (Firm)	18	9	2.9 (1)	1st	1:33.6	2 lengths	Yutaka Take	(Azuma Sanders)
23 May	Tokyo	Yushun Himba	G1	2400m (Good)	18	5	1.4 (1)	4th	2:27.8	(3 3/4 lengths)	Yutaka Take	Daiwa El Cielo
3 Jul	Hollywood Park	American Oaks	G1	1 1/4 miles (Firm)	13	6	1.4 (1)	2nd	2:01.6	(1 length)	Yutaka Take	Ticker Tape
17 Oct	Kyoto	Shuka Sho	G1	2000m (Firm)	18	2	1.7 (1)	4th	1:59.3	(5 1/2 lengths)	Yutaka Take	Sweep Tosho
31 Oct	Tokyo	Tenno Sho (Autumn)	G1	2000m (Good)	17	4	38.3 (13)	2nd	1:59.1	(1 1/4 lengths)	Christophe Lemaire	Zenno Rob Roy
21 Nov	Kyoto	Mile Championship	G1	1600m (Firm)	16	15	7.2 (4)	2nd	1:33.3	(2 lengths)	Christophe Lemaire	Durandal
12 Dec	Sha Tin	Hong Kong Cup	G1	2000m (Firm)	14	14	5.0 (2)	13th	2:04.9	(10 lengths)	Olivier Peslier	Alexander Goldrun
2005 – four-year-old season
15 May	Tokyo	Keio Hai Spring Cup	G2	1400m (Firm)	18	15	3.6 (1)	9th	1:21.4	(6 3/4 lengths)	Kent Desormeaux	Asakusa Den'en
5 Jun	Tokyo	Yasuda Kinen	G1	1600m (Firm)	18	5	7.5 (3)	18th	1:36.0	(20 3/4 lengths)	Kent Desormeaux	Asakusa Den'en
14 Aug	Sapporo	Hokkaido Shimbun Hai Queen Stakes	G3	1800m (Firm)	14	8	3.3 (2)	8th	1:47.8	(7 1/4 lengths)	Shinji Fujita	Les Clefs d'Or
21 Aug	Sapporo	Sapporo Kinen	G2	2000m (Firm)	14	12	6.0 (3)	12th	2:03.6	(16 1/4 lengths)	Norihiro Yokoyama	Heavenly Romance
16 Oct	Tokyo	Fuchu Himba Stakes	G3	1800m (Good)	17	4	5.3 (2)	8th	1:47.4	(4 1/4 lengths)	Hiroshi Kitamura	Yamanin Alabaster
30 Oct	Tokyo	Tenno Sho (Autumn)	G1	2000m (Firm)	18	12	53.9 (13)	3rd	2:00.1	(1/4 length)	Hiroshi Kitamura	Heavenly Romance
20 Nov	Kyoto	Mile Championship	G1	1600m (Firm)	17	8	17.8 (5)	4th	1:32.3	(1 1/4 lengths)	Hiroshi Kitamura	Hat Trick
2006 – five-year-old season
15 Apr	Hanshin	Yomiuri Milers Cup	G2	1600m (Good)	11	6	4.5 (2)	2nd	1:36.3	(3/4 length)	Yutaka Take	Daiwa Major
14 May	Tokyo	Victoria Mile	G1	1600m (Good)	18	1	3.9 (2)	1st	1:34.0	1 1/4 lengths	Hiroshi Kitamura	(Air Messiah)
4 Jun	Tokyo	Yasuda Kinen	G1	1600m (Firm)	18	2	7.3 (4)	5th	1:33.3	(4 lengths)	Hiroshi Kitamura	Bullish Luck
1 Jul	Hollywood Park	CashCall Mile Stakes	G3	1 mile (Firm)	8	2	3.4 (2)	1st	R1:33.3	1 3/4 length	Victor Espinoza	(Sweet Talker)
8 Oct	Tokyo	Mainichi Okan	G2	1800m (Firm)	16	10	5.5 (2)	2nd	1:45.5	(neck)	Hiroshi Kitamura	Daiwa Major
29 Oct	Tokyo	Tenno Sho (Autumn)	G1	2000m (Firm)	16	4	7.1 (5)	6th	1:59.3	(3 1/4 lengths)	Hiroshi Kitamura	Daiwa Major
19 Nov	Kyoto	Mile Championship	G1	1600m (Firm)	18	7	6.7 (3)	2nd	1:32.8	(neck)	Yutaka Take	Daiwa Major
10 Dec	Sha Tin	Hong Kong Mile	G1	1600m (Good to Firm)	14	14	9.2 (4)	12th	1:34.0	(6 lengths)	Yutaka Take	The Duke

Legend:

- R indicated that it was a record finish time.

== Retirement ==
On December 13, 2006, three days after the Hong Kong Mile race was taking place, Dance in the Mood was retired from racing to become a broodmare at Shadai Farm in Chitose, Hokkaido. Her most notable progeny is Dance Fantasia who won the Fairy Stakes in 2011.

Dance in the Mood retired from breeding on November 6, 2021. She spent the last remaining years at Shadai Farm, until her passing on January 19, 2026.

=== Breeding record ===
c = colt, f = filly, g = gelding

No.	Name	Year	Sex	Color	Sire	Wins	Races	Remarks
1st	Dance Fantasia	2008	f	Bay	Falbrav	3	29	Retired, broodmare
2nd	Satono President	2009	g	Dark Bay	Symboli Kris S	2	22	Retired, riding horse
3rd	Man in the Moon	2010	g	Gray	Chichicastenango	2	21	Retired, lead horse
4th	Shadow Dancer	2011	g	Dark Bay	White Muzzle	4	33	Retired
5th	Flawless Dancer	2012	f	Bay	Harbinger	1	13	Retired, broodmare
6th	Kaiserball	2013	f	Dark Bay	Empire Maker	5	21	Retired, broodmare
7th	Mood Maker	2014	c	Dark Bay	Empire Maker	0	2	Retired
8h	Chandelier Spin	2015	f	Brown	Novellist	0	5	Retired, broodmare
9th	Dance Delight	2016	c	Dark Bay	King Kamehameha	4	19	Retired, riding horse
	(infertility)				King Kamehameha			
10th	Informant	2018	c	Dark Bay	Novellist	8	130	Active
11th	Etoso	2019	f	Bay	King Kamehameha	0	4	Retired, broodmare
	(not foaled)	2020			Lord Kanaloa			
	(not foaled)	2021			Bricks and Mortar			
	(not foaled)	2022						

== Pedigree ==
Pedigree of Dance in the Mood (JPN), dark bay mare 2001
Sire Sunday Silence (USA) 1986	Halo (USA); 1969	Hail to Reason	Turn-To
Sire Sunday Silence (USA) 1986	Halo (USA); 1969	Hail to Reason	Nothirdchance
Sire Sunday Silence (USA) 1986	Halo (USA); 1969	Cosmah	Cosmic Bomb
Sire Sunday Silence (USA) 1986	Halo (USA); 1969	Cosmah	Almahmoud
Sire Sunday Silence (USA) 1986	Wishing Well (USA); 1975	Understanding	Promised Land
Sire Sunday Silence (USA) 1986	Wishing Well (USA); 1975	Understanding	Pretty Ways
Sire Sunday Silence (USA) 1986	Wishing Well (USA); 1975	Mountain Flower	Montparnasse
Sire Sunday Silence (USA) 1986	Wishing Well (USA); 1975	Mountain Flower	Edelweiss
Dam Dancing Key (USA) 1983	Nijinsky (CAN); 1967	Northern Dancer	Nearctic
Dam Dancing Key (USA) 1983	Nijinsky (CAN); 1967	Northern Dancer	Natalma
Dam Dancing Key (USA) 1983	Nijinsky (CAN); 1967	Flaming Page	Bull Page
Dam Dancing Key (USA) 1983	Nijinsky (CAN); 1967	Flaming Page	Flaring Top
Dam Dancing Key (USA) 1983	Key Partner (USA); 1976	Key to the Mint	Graustark
Dam Dancing Key (USA) 1983	Key Partner (USA); 1976	Key to the Mint	Key Bridge
Dam Dancing Key (USA) 1983	Key Partner (USA); 1976	Native Partner	Raise A Native
Dam Dancing Key (USA) 1983	Key Partner (USA); 1976	Native Partner	Dinner Partner (Family 7)
