= Royal Heroine Stakes =

- Class: Grade III
- Location: Santa Anita Park; Arcadia, California, USA
- Inaugurated: 1986 (as Royal Heroine Handicap at Hollywood Park Racetrack)
- Race type: Thoroughbred - Flat racing
- Website: Santa Anita Park

Race information
- Distance: 1 mile
- Surface: Turf
- Track: Left-handed
- Qualification: Four years old and older
- Weight: 124 lbs with allowances
- Purse: $100,000 (since 2024)

The Royal Heroine Stakes is a Grade III American Thoroughbred horse race for fillies and mares that are four years old or older, over a distance of one mile on the turf held annually in April at Santa Anita Park, Arcadia, California. The event currently carries a purse of $100,000.

== History ==
The event was named in honor of the great Champion filly, Royal Heroine, who won the inaugural running of the Breeders' Cup Mile at Hollywood Park Racetrack in North American record time.

The event was inaugurated on 12 December 1986 as the Royal Heroine Handicap held at Hollywood Park Racetrack for three year old fillies over the 1 1/16 miles distance and was won by Mary Jones Bradley's Miraculous who was ridden by US Hall of Fame jockey Gary Stevens and trained by US Hall of Fame trainer Charles E. Whittingham in a time of 1:41 4/5.

After an absence of 11 years, the event was renewed on 18 July 1998 as the Royal Heroine Stakes over the one mile distance with conditions for fillies and mares, three years old and older and was won by French bred mare Tuzla who won by a neck defeating the favorite Sonja's Faith (IRE) and four other runners in a time of 1:34.33. The following year, Tuzla would start the favorite and repeat winning by three-quarters of a length.

In 2001 the event was upgraded to a Grade III event.

In 2006 with the influx of sponsorship dollars from CashCall the events purse was raised to $750,000 and renamed to the CashCall Mile Stakes.

In 2007 the event was upgraded to a Grade II event and was an invitational event which reflected in the name. The sponsorship of CashCall ended in 2009 and the event was changed to the Royal Heroine Mile Stakes.

In 2014 with the closure of Hollywood Park Racetrack the event was moved to Santa Anita Park and scheduled in June. The conditions of the event in 2016 changed so that three year old fillies were not included.

In 2020 due to the COVID-19 pandemic in the United States, Santa Anita closed their track and the event was cancelled

In 2024 the event was downgraded by the Thoroughbred Owners and Breeders Association to Grade III status.

== Records ==
Speed record:

- 1 mile: 1:33.33 – Dance in the Mood (JPN) (2006)

Margins:

- 2 3/4 lengths – Vasilika (2019)

Most wins:

- 2 – Tuzla (FR) (1998, 1999)

Most wins by an owner:

- 2 – David Milch (1998, 1999)
- 2 – Jerry Hollendorfer (2014, 2019)

Most wins by a jockey:

- 4 – Corey Nakatani (1998, 1999, 2003, 2017)

Most wins by a trainer:

- 5 – Philip D'Amato (2015, 2021, 2022, 2024, 2025)

== Winners ==
Year	Winner	Age	Jockey	Trainer	Owner	Distance	Time	Purse	Grade	Ref
At Santa Anita Park – Royal Heroine Stakes
2026	Take A Breath (GB)	4	Emisael Jaramillo	Mark Glatt	Chivalry Thoroughbred Racing and Rancho Temescal Thoroughbred Partners	1 mile	1:35.95	$100,000	III	
2025	Public Assembly	4	Antonio Fresu	Philip D'Amato	Abbondanza Racing LLC, Medallion Racing and Lissa Ann McNulty	1 mile	1:36.13	$100,000	III	
2024	Uncorked (AUS)	5	Frankie Dettori	Philip D'Amato	The Elkstone Group	1 mile	1:34.06	$102,000	III	
2023	Closing Remarks	5	Joe Bravo	Carla Gaines	Harris Farms	1 mile	1:34.82	$200,500	II	
2022	Going Global (IRE)	4	Umberto Rispoli	Philip D'Amato	CYBT, Michael Dubb, Saul Gevertz, Michael Nentwig & Ray Pagano	1 mile	1:33.97	$196,000	II	
2021	Charmaine's Mia	5	Flavien Prat	Philip D'Amato	Agave Racing Stable & Rockin Robin Racing Stables	1 mile	1:33.76	$201,500	II	
2020	Race not held									
2019	Vasilika	4	Flavien Prat	Jerry Hollendorfer	All Schlaich Stables, Jerry Hollendorfer, Gatto Racing & George Todaro	1 mile	1:34.52	$200,702	II	
2018	Beau Recall (IRE)	4	Joel Rosario	Simon Callaghan	Slam Dunk Racing & Medallion Racing	1 mile	1:34.52	$201,380	II	
2017	Hillhouse High	6	Corey Nakatani	Richard Baltas	Golden Eagle Farm	1 mile	1:33.61	$200,690	II	
2016	Nancy From Nairobi (GB)	5	Abel Lezcano	John W. Sadler	Hronis Racing	1 mile	1:37.12	$203,105	II	
2015	Fanticola	5	Joseph Talamo	Philip D'Amato	Anthony Fanticola & Joseph Scardino	1 mile	1:36.76	$201,000	II	
2014	Parranda	5	Elvis Trujillo	Jerry Hollendorfer	Jerry Hollendorfer, Gillian Campbell, Dan Clark & Greg Skoda	1 mile	1:35.27	$201,250	II	
At Hollywood Park – Royal Heroine Mile Stakes
2013	Schiaparelli	5	Joseph Talamo	Mike Puype	Ran Jan Racing	1 mile	1:34.11	$150,000	II	
2012	Quiet Oasis (IRE)	4	Mario Gutierrez	Ben D. A. Cecil	Reddam Racing	1 mile	1:35.06	$150,000	II	
2011	Celtic Princess (BRZ)	7	Rafael Bejarano	Antonio C. Avila	Jessica Coudelaria	1 mile	1:33.74	$150,000	II	
2010	Gotta Have Her	6	Tyler Baze	Jenine Sahadi	Green Lantern Stables	1 mile	1:34.98	$150,000	II	
2009	Tuscan Evening (IRE)	4	Rafael Bejarano	Jerry Hollendorfer	William de Burgh	1 mile	1:33.71	$250,000	II	
CashCall Mile Stakes
2008	Diamond Diva (GB)	4	David R. Flores	James M. Cassidy	Three Chimneys Racing	1 mile	1:34.07	$750,000	II	
2007	Lady of Venice (FR)	4	Julien R. Leparoux	Patrick L. Biancone	Martin S. Schwartz	1 mile	1:33.56	$1,000,000	II	
2006	Dance in the Mood (JPN)	5	Victor Espinoza	Kazuo Fujisawa	Shadai Race Horse	1 mile	1:33.33	$750,000	III	
Royal Heroine Stakes
2005	Intercontinental (GB)	5	Jerry D. Bailey	Robert J. Frankel	Juddmonte Farms	1 mile	1:34.33	$200,000	III	
2004	Janeian (NZ)	6	Kent J. Desormeaux	W. Bret Calhoun	Greg L. England	1 mile	1:34.79	$109,700	III	
2003	Magic Mission (GB)	5	Corey Nakatani	Neil D. Drysdale	Maktoum bin Rashid Al Maktoum	1 mile	1:34.25	$112,200	III	
2002	Surya	4	Kent J. Desormeaux	Robert J. Frankel	Flaxman Holdings	1 mile	1:34.73	$114,800	III	
2001	Kalatiara (AUS)	4	Chris McCarron	Ron McAnally	Stonerside Stable	1 mile	1:34.41	$109,900	III	
2000	Tranquility Lake	5	Eddie Delahoussaye	Julio C. Canani	Pam & Martin Wygod	1 mile	1:33.98	$78,775	Listed	
1999	Tuzla (FR)	5	Corey Nakatani	Julio C. Canani	David Milch	1 mile	1:34.32	$70,400	Listed	
1998	Tuzla (FR)	4	Corey Nakatani	Julio C. Canani	David Milch	1 mile	1:34.33	$71,650	Listed	
1987–1997		Race not held								
Royal Heroine Handicap
1986	Miraculous	3	Gary L. Stevens	Charles E. Whittingham	Mary Jones Bradley	1 1/16 miles	1:41.80	$40,000		

== See also ==
- List of American and Canadian Graded races
