= Rhein Kraft =

Japanese Thoroughbred racehorse

Rhein Kraft ラインクラフト
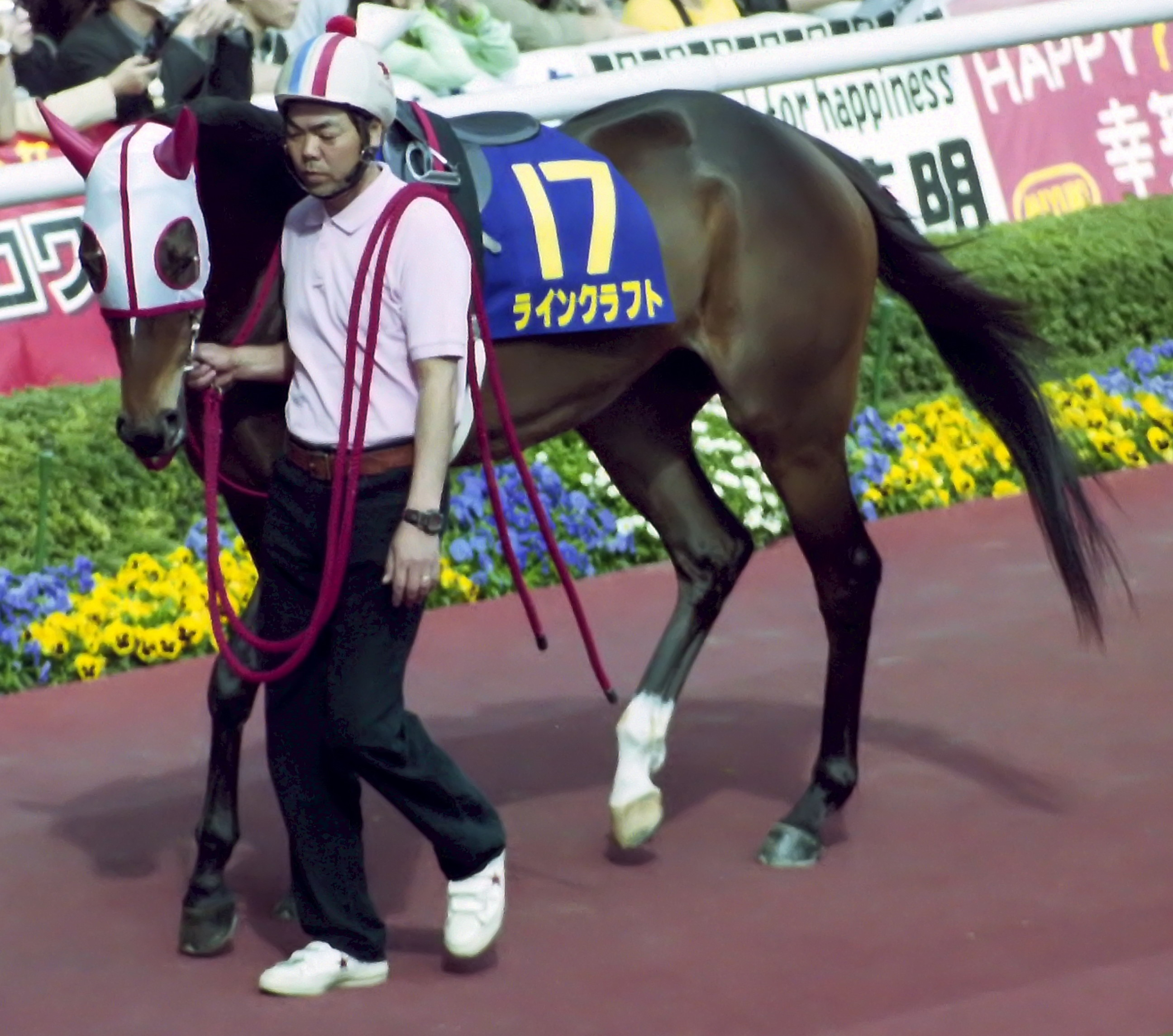
- Rhein Kraft at the 2005 Oka Shō.
- Breed: Thoroughbred
- Sire: End Sweep
- Grandsire: Forty Niner
- Dam: Must Be Loved
- Damsire: Sunday Silence
- Sex: Mare
- Foaled: April 4, 2002
- Died: August 18, 2006 (aged 4)
- Country: Japan
- Colour: Bay
- Breeder: Northern Farm
- Owner: Shigemasa Osawa
- Racing colours
- Trainer: Tsutomo Setoguchi
- Jockey: Yuichi Fukunaga
- Record: 13: 6-3-2
- Earnings: ¥505,630,000

Major wins
- Fantasy Stakes (2004); Fillies' Revue (2005); NHK Mile Cup (2005); Hanshin Himba Stakes (2006); Japanese Classic Tiara Race wins: Oka Shō (2005)

Rhein Kraft (Japanese: ラインクラフト, Hepburn: Rain Kurafuto; 4 April 2002–18 August 2006) was a Japanese Thoroughbred racehorse. She was one of the best juvenile fillies in Japan in 2004 when she won two of her three races including the Fantasy Stakes and ran third in the Hanshin Juvenile Fillies. She improved in the following year, winning the Fillies' Revue, Oka Sho and NHK Mile Cup as well as finishing second in the Shuka Sho and third in the Mile Championship. As a four-year-old she was narrowly beaten in the Takamatsunomiya Kinen and won the Hanshin Himba Stakes before dying of a heart attack in August 2006.

== Background ==
Rhein Kraft was a dark bay mare with an irregular white blaze bred in Japan by Northern Farm. During her racing career she was trained by Tsutomo Setoguchi and raced in the pink and green colours of Shigemasa Osawa. She was ridden in most of her races by Yuichi Fukunaga.

She was sired by End Sweep an American horse who won six races in the United States including the Grade III Jersey Shore Breeders' Cup Stakes in 1994 and was later imported to Japan to become a breeding stallion. His other progeny have included Admire Moon, Sweep Tosho and Swept Overboard (Metropolitan Handicap).

Rhein Kraft's dam Must Be Loved showed no racing ability, failing to win or place in three starts, but did better as a broodmare as she also produced Admire Royal (Procyon Stakes) and Florentino (Jefferson Cup Stakes). Her dam Dyna Shoot was a successful racemare who won the Keio Hai Nisai Stakes, Tanabata Sho and Niigata Nisai Stakes. She was a female-line descendant of the Californian broodmare Fancimine who was imported to Japan in 1971.

== Racing career ==
=== 2004: two-year-old season ===
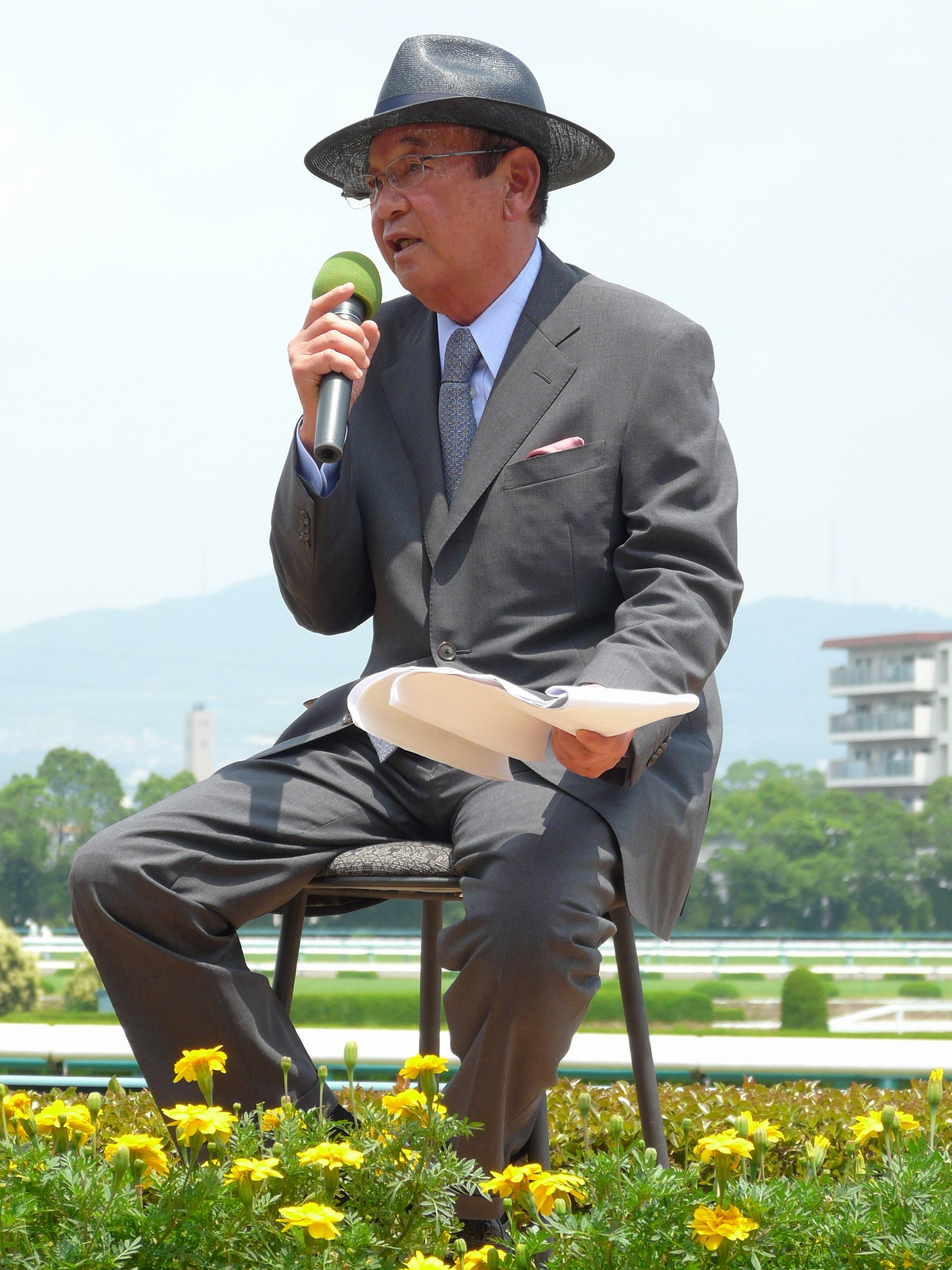
Rhein Kraft's trainer Tsutomu Setoguchi

Rhein Kraft made a successful track debut when she won a maiden race over 1400 metres at Kyoto Racecourse on 16 October. Three weeks later the filly was stepped up in class for the Grade 3 Fantasy Stakes over the same course and distance and won from Monroe Blond and eleven others. On 5 December at Hanshin Racecourse Rhein Kraft was moved up to the highest level to contest the Grade 1 Hanshin Juvenile Fillies over 1600 metres and finished a close third, beaten a head and a nose by Shonan Peintre and Ambroise.

In the official Japanese ratings for 2004, Rhein Kraft was rated the second-best two-year-old filly, level with Ambroise and a pound behind Shonan Peintre.

=== 2005: three-year-old season ===
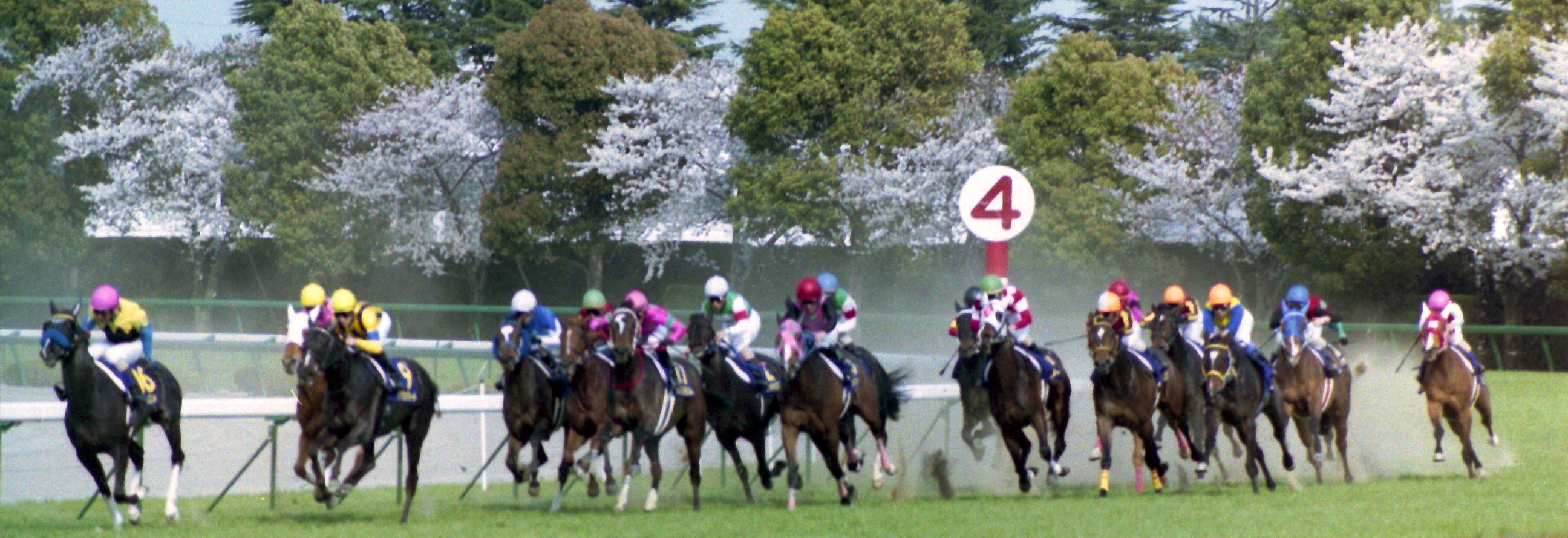
Rhein Kraft (6th horse from the left) running the Oka Sho

On her first appearance as a three-year-old, Rhein Kraft won the Grade 2 Fillies Revue, a major trial race for the Oka Sho, over 1400 metres at Hanshin on 19 February, beating Daring Heart and Air Messiah in a close finish. In the Oka Sho at the same track on 10 April Rhein Kraft started second favourite behind Cesario (Flower Cup), while the other sixteen runners included Shonan Peintre, Ambroise, Daring Heart, Air Messiah, Monroe Blond, Lailaps (Daily Hai Queen Cup), Felicia (Fairy Stakes) and Eishin Tender (Tulip Sho). Rhein Kraft was in contention from the start, went to the front in the straight, and held off a strong late challenge from Cesario to win by a head.

Four weeks after her win in the Oka Sho, Rhein Kraft was matched against male opponents in the NHK Mile Cup at Tokyo Racecourse. Daring Heart was again in opposition, while the sixteen colts in the race included Big Planet (Arlington Cup), Meiner Hearty (New Zealand Trophy), Peer Gynt (Daily Hai Nisai Stakes, Shinzan Kinen) and Deep Summer (Crystal Cup). Rhein Kraft was always going well and won "effortlessly" by one and three quarter lengths from Daring Heart.

After a four-month break Rhein Kraft returned in September when she finished second to Air Messiah in the Rose Stakes over 2000 metres at Hanshin. At Kyoto on 16 October she again ran second to Air Messiah when she was beaten a neck into second place in the Grade 1 Shuka Sho. On 20 November the filly faced older horses for the first time in the Mile Championship at Kyoto, a race in which she started at odds of 5.9/1 and finished third behind the four-year-old colts Hat Trick and Daiwa Major. She ended the season by finishing fourth behind the five-year-old mare Admire Groove in the Hanshin Himba Stakes in December.

In the official Japanese ratings for 2005, Rhein Kraft was rated the second-best three-year-old filly, level with Air Messiah and eight pounds behind Cesario.

=== 2006: four-year-old season ===
For her first appearance of 2006 Rhein Kraft was dropped back to sprint distances for the Takamatsunomiya Kinen over 1200 metres at Chukyo Racecourse on 26 March and finished second of the eighteen runners, beaten a neck by the six-year-old Orewa Matteruze. In the Hanshin Himba Stakes over 1400 metres on 18 April the filly recorded her first win in eleven months as she came home two and a half lengths in front of her old rival Air Messiah. In the Victoria Mile at Tokyo on 14 May Rhein Kraft came home ninth of the eighteen runners, beaten five and a quarter lengths behind the winner Dance In The Mood.

On August 18, Rhein Kraft suddenly died of acute heart failure during training at the Northern Farm Airport Farm. She was only 4 years old at the time of her death.

== In popular culture ==
An anthropomorphized version of Rhein Kraft appears as a character in the Japanese multimedia franchise Umamusume: Pretty Derby, voiced by Nanae Kojima. She is depicted as a sweet, optimistic girl who enjoys sunbathing and devoting herself to her goal of winning the Japanese Triple Tiara. She is featured as the protagonist of the second part of the mobile game's main story, alongside her mentor King Halo and her friends Cesario, Fusaichi Pandora, Daring Heart, and Air Messiah. Her real-life counterpart's premature death is referenced in her career mode and in the second chapter of the game's main story when she is severely injured and hospitalized, but miraculously survives.

== Racing form ==
Below data is based on data available on JBIS Search and netkeiba.com.

Date	Track	Race	Grade	Distance (Condition)	Entry	HN	Odds (Favored)	Finish	Time	Margins	Jockey	Winner (Runner-up)
2004 – two-year-old season
Oct 16	Kyoto	2yo Newcomer		1,400 m (Firm)	16	7	5.3 (3)	1st	1:21.8	–0.8	Yuichi Fukunaga	(Rusunai of Sakura)
Nov 7	Kyoto	Fantasy Stakes	3	1,400 m (Firm)	13	3	2.7 (2)	1st	1:21.6	–0.7	Yuichi Fukunaga	(Monroe Blond)
Dec 5	Hanshin	Hanshin Juvenile Fillies	1	1,600 m (Firm)	18	3	1.5 (1)	3rd	1:35.2	0.0	Yuichi Fukunaga	Shonan Peintre
2005 – three-year-old season
Mar 13	Hanshin	Fillies' Revue	2	1,400 m (Firm)	15	8	1.8 (1)	1st	1:21.2	0.0	Yuichi Fukunaga	(Daring Heart)
Apr 10	Hanshin	Oka Sho	1	1,600 m (Firm)	18	17	4.6 (2)	1st	1:33.5	0.0	Yuichi Fukunaga	(Cesario)
May 8	Tokyo	NHK Mile Cup	1	1,600 m (Firm)	18	12	3.9 (2)	1st	1:33.6	–0.3	Yuichi Fukunaga	(Daring Heart)
Sep 18	Hanshin	Rose Stakes	2	2,000 m (Firm)	15	10	2.2 (1)	2nd	2:00.2	0.1	Yuichi Fukunaga	Air Messiah
Oct 16	Kyoto	Shuka Sho	1	2,000 m (Firm)	18	5	1.8 (1)	2nd	1:59.2	0.0	Yuichi Fukunaga	Air Messiah
Nov 20	Kyoto	Mile Championship	1	1,600 m (Firm)	17	1	6.9 (2)	3rd	1:32.3	0.2	Yuichi Fukunaga	Hat Trick
Dec 18	Hanshin	Hanshin Himba Stakes	2	1,600 m (Firm)	11	2	1.6 (1)	4th	1:35.1	0.6	Yuichi Fukunaga	Admire Groove
2006 – four-year-old season
Mar 26	Chukyo	Takamatsunomiya Kinen	1	1,200 m (Firm)	18	14	4.7 (2)	2nd	1:08.0	0.0	Yuichi Fukunaga	Orewa Matteruze
Apr 8	Hanshin	Hanshin Himba Stakes	2	1,400 m (Firm)	12	4	1.7 (1)	1st	1:21.2	–0.5	Yuichi Fukunaga	(Air Messiah)
May 14	Tokyo	Victoria Mile	1	1,600 m (Good)	18	6	2.4 (1)	9th	1:34.8	0.8	Yuichi Fukunaga	Dance in the Mood

== Pedigree ==
Pedigree of Rhein Kraft (JPN), bay mare, 2002
Sire End Sweep (USA) 1991	Forty Niner (USA); 1985	Mr. Prospector	Raise a Native
Sire End Sweep (USA) 1991	Forty Niner (USA); 1985	Mr. Prospector	Gold Digger
Sire End Sweep (USA) 1991	Forty Niner (USA); 1985	File	Tom Rolfe
Sire End Sweep (USA) 1991	Forty Niner (USA); 1985	File	Continue
Sire End Sweep (USA) 1991	Broom Dance (USA); 1979	Dance Spell	Northern Dancer (CAN)
Sire End Sweep (USA) 1991	Broom Dance (USA); 1979	Dance Spell	Obeah
Sire End Sweep (USA) 1991	Broom Dance (USA); 1979	Witching Hour	Thinking Cap
Sire End Sweep (USA) 1991	Broom Dance (USA); 1979	Witching Hour	Enchanted Eve
Dam Must Be Loved (JPN) 1993	Sunday Silence (USA); 1986	Halo	Hail To Reason
Dam Must Be Loved (JPN) 1993	Sunday Silence (USA); 1986	Halo	Cosmah
Dam Must Be Loved (JPN) 1993	Sunday Silence (USA); 1986	Wishing Well	Understanding
Dam Must Be Loved (JPN) 1993	Sunday Silence (USA); 1986	Wishing Well	Mountain Flower
Dam Must Be Loved (JPN) 1993	Dyna Shoot (JPN); 1982	Northern Taste (CAN)	Northern Dancer
Dam Must Be Loved (JPN) 1993	Dyna Shoot (JPN); 1982	Northern Taste (CAN)	Lady Victoria
Dam Must Be Loved (JPN) 1993	Dyna Shoot (JPN); 1982	Shadai Mine	Hitting Away (USA)
Dam Must Be Loved (JPN) 1993	Dyna Shoot (JPN); 1982	Shadai Mine	Fancimine (USA) (Family:9-f)

- Rhein Kraft was inbred 4 × 4 to Northern Dancer, meaning that this stallion appears twice in the fourth generation of her pedigree.
