= Cesario (horse) =

Japanese-bred Thoroughbred racehorse (2002–2021)

Cesario シーザリオ
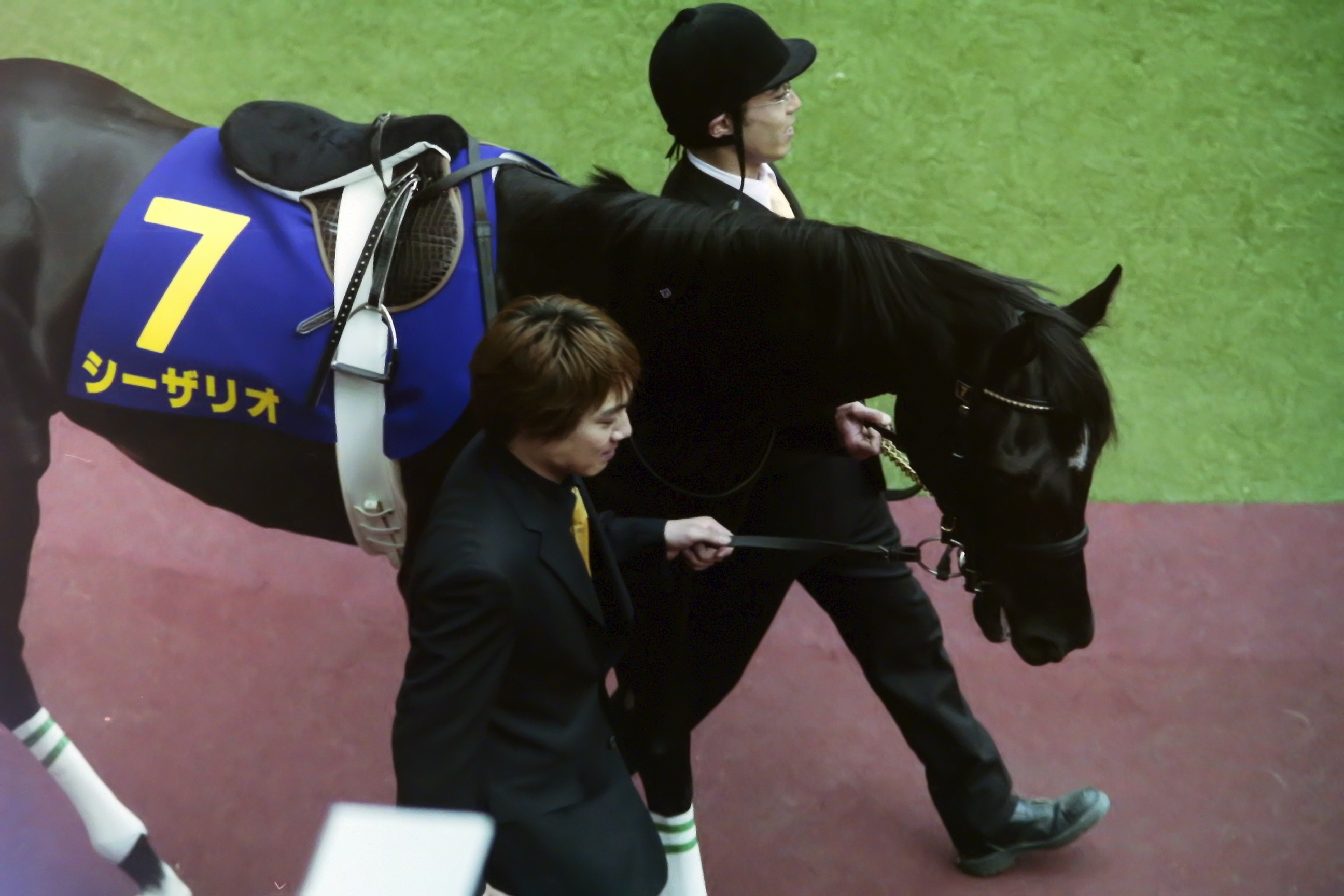
- Cesario at the paddock at the 2005 Oka Shō.
- Breed: Thoroughbred
- Sire: Special Week
- Grandsire: Sunday Silence
- Dam: Kirov Premiere
- Damsire: Sadler's Wells
- Sex: Mare
- Foaled: March 31, 2002
- Died: February 27, 2021 (aged 18)
- Country: Japan
- Colour: Black
- Breeder: Northern Farm
- Owner: Carrot Farm Co. Ltd.
- Racing colours
- Trainer: Katsuhiko Sumii
- Jockey: Yuichi Fukunaga
- Record: 6: 5–1–0
- Earnings: ¥274,433,400; JPN: ¥228,296,000 JPY; USA: $450,000 USD

Major wins
- Flower Cup (2005); American Oaks (2005); Japanese Classic Tiara Race wins: Yushun Himba (2005)

Awards
- JRA Award for Best Three-Year-Old Filly (2005); JRA Award for Best Horse By Home-bred Sire

Cesario (Japanese: シーザリオ, Hepburn: Shīzario; March 31, 2002 – February 27, 2021) was a champion Japanese Thoroughbred racehorse and broodmare who won the Yushun Himba (Japanese Oaks) and American Oaks in 2005.

== Background ==
Cesario's sire Special Week was a champion horse who won the Tokyo Yushun (Japanese Derby) in 1998, as well as the Tenno Sho (Spring), Tenno Sho (Autumn) and Japan Cup in 1999. Her dam, Kirov Premiere, a horse bred in Britain and trained in Ireland, also had good performance on turf who won the Group 3 race Rutgers Handicap in 1993.

The horse is named after the male alias assumed by Viola, the main protagonist of the play Twelfth Night by William Shakespeare.

== Racing career ==
=== 2004: Two-year-old season ===
Cesario's racing career started, with Yuichi Fukunaga in saddle, in a maiden race over 1600 meters held at Hanshin Racecourse on December 25.

=== 2005: Three-year-old season ===
Cesario began her second season with the 2000 meter race Kanchiku Sho, defeating Admire Fuji by a neck. Two months later she moved up in class and set her sights on a graded race debut with the Grade III Flower Cup, an 1800 meter race at Nakayama Racecourse. She won by two and half lengths, breaking the race's record in the process.

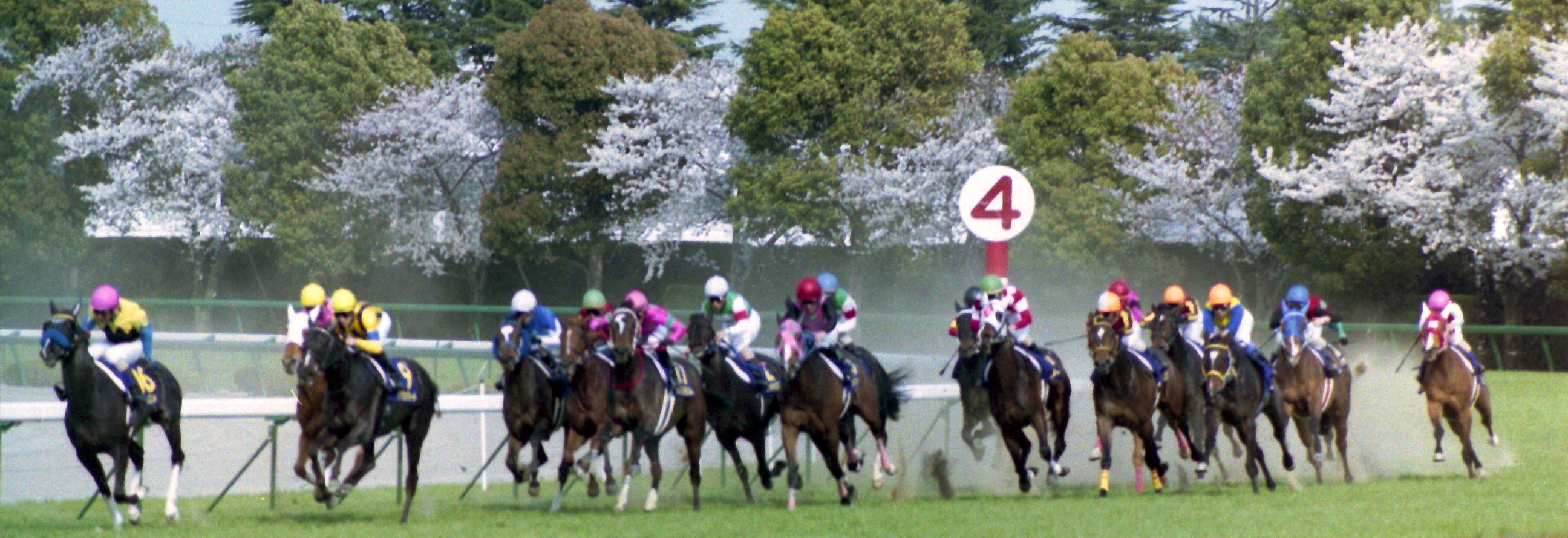
Oka Sho 2005, approaching the home straight

After becoming a graded race winner, her next race was the Oka Sho, the first race of Japanese Fillies' Triple Crown (Triple Tiara). As Fukunaga announced he would ride Rhein Kraft in the same race, Cesario's jockey was changed to Minoru Yoshida. The race was close, with Rhein Kraft defeating Cesario by a head.

Later, she raced in the second leg of Triple Tiara, which was the Grade I race Yushun Himba (Japanese Oaks) held at Tokyo Racecourse. As her main rival Rhein Kraft chose to join the NHK Mile Cup, Cesario could once again be ridden by Fukunaga in the race. She finished the last three furlongs in 33.3 seconds, winning her first Grade I crown by a neck.

Cesario's trainer Katsuhiko Sumii announced their plan to join the American Oaks. After a one-month break, she arrived at Hollywood Park on 20 June to compete with several strong rivals such as unbeaten horse Melhor Ainda, Premio Regina Elena (Italian 1,000 Guineas) winner Silver Cup and Oaks d'Italia runner up Hallowed Dream. Cesario won by four lengths and broke the record with a time of 1:59.03, becoming the first Japanese trained three-year-old horse to win an overseas Grade 1 race. Because of her great performance in this race, Cesario was described as a "Japanese Super Star" by a local race commenter.

After returning to Japan, Cesario originally planned to come back to America and participate in the Breeders' Cup Filly & Mare Turf held at Belmont Park in November. However, she showed symptoms of Suspensory Desmitis, causing the plans to be scrapped.

For her efforts in winning two Oaks titles, Cesario was given the JRA Award for Best Three-Year-Old Filly and JRA Award for Best Horse By Home-bred Sire.

=== 2006: Four-year-old Season ===
In the beginning of 2006, as Cesario showed a good recovery, Sumii planned to let her race in the inaugural Grade I race Victoria Mile. However, Cesario developed symptoms of Suspensory Desmitis again. As a result, Carrot Club decided to retire her to become a broodmare in order to avoid any future risk.

== Retirement ==
Cesario was retired to become a broodmare at Northern Farm. She had produced twelve foals, including Epiphaneia, Leontes and Saturnalia who won five Grade 1 races combined.

Her sons later achieved success as breeding stallions as they have produced multiple Grade 1 winners, such as Daring Tact, Efforia, Danon Decile, T O Royal, Museum Mile, Cavallerizzo and Rodeo Drive, among others. Additionally, Epiphaneia's full-sister, Rosalind, is the dam of Authority (by Orfevre), a two-time winner of the Copa Republica Argentina who also won the 2020 Aoba Sho and the 2022 Neom Turf Cup.

=== Breeding record ===
c = colt, f = filly, g = gelding

No.	Name	Year	Sex	Color	Sire	Wins	Races	Remarks
1st	Twelfth Night	2007	c	Dark Bay	King Kamehameha	1	1	Retired
2nd	Viola	2008	f	Brown	King Kamehameha			Did not race
	(not foaled)	2009			War Emblem			
3rd	Epiphaneia	2010	c	Bay	Symboli Kris S	6	14	Retired, breeding stallion
4th	Rosalind	2011	f	Dark Bay	Symboli Kris S	0	6	Retired, broodmare
5th	Claudio	2012	g	Bay	Harbinger	1	31	Retired
6th	Leontes	2013	c	Dark Bay	King Kamehameha	2	5	Retired, breeding stallion
7th	Globe Theatre	2014	c	Dark Bay	King Kamehameha	7	26	Retired
8th	Celia	2015	f	Brown	King Kamehameha	2	14	Retired, broodmare
9th	Saturnalia	2016	c	Dark Bay	Lord Kanaloa	6	10	Retired, breeding stallion
10th	First Folio	2017	f	Chestnut	King Kamehameha	4	18	Retired, broodmare
11th	Lupercalia	2018	c	Bay	Maurice	2	12	Retired
	(not foaled)	2019			Lord Kanaloa			
12th	Tempest	2020	f	Dark Bay	Lord Kanaloa	1	8	Retired, broodmare
	(died while in pregnancy)				Lord Kanaloa			

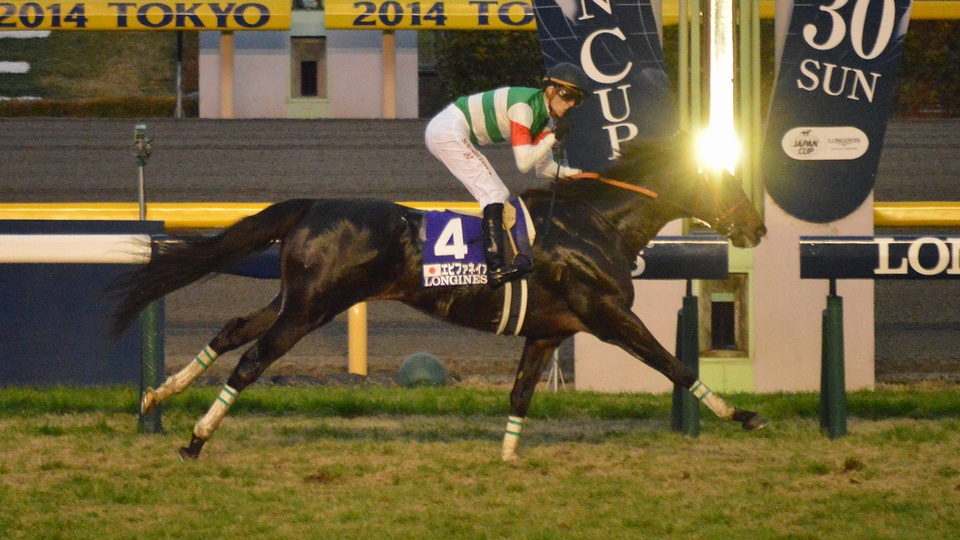
Epiphaneia

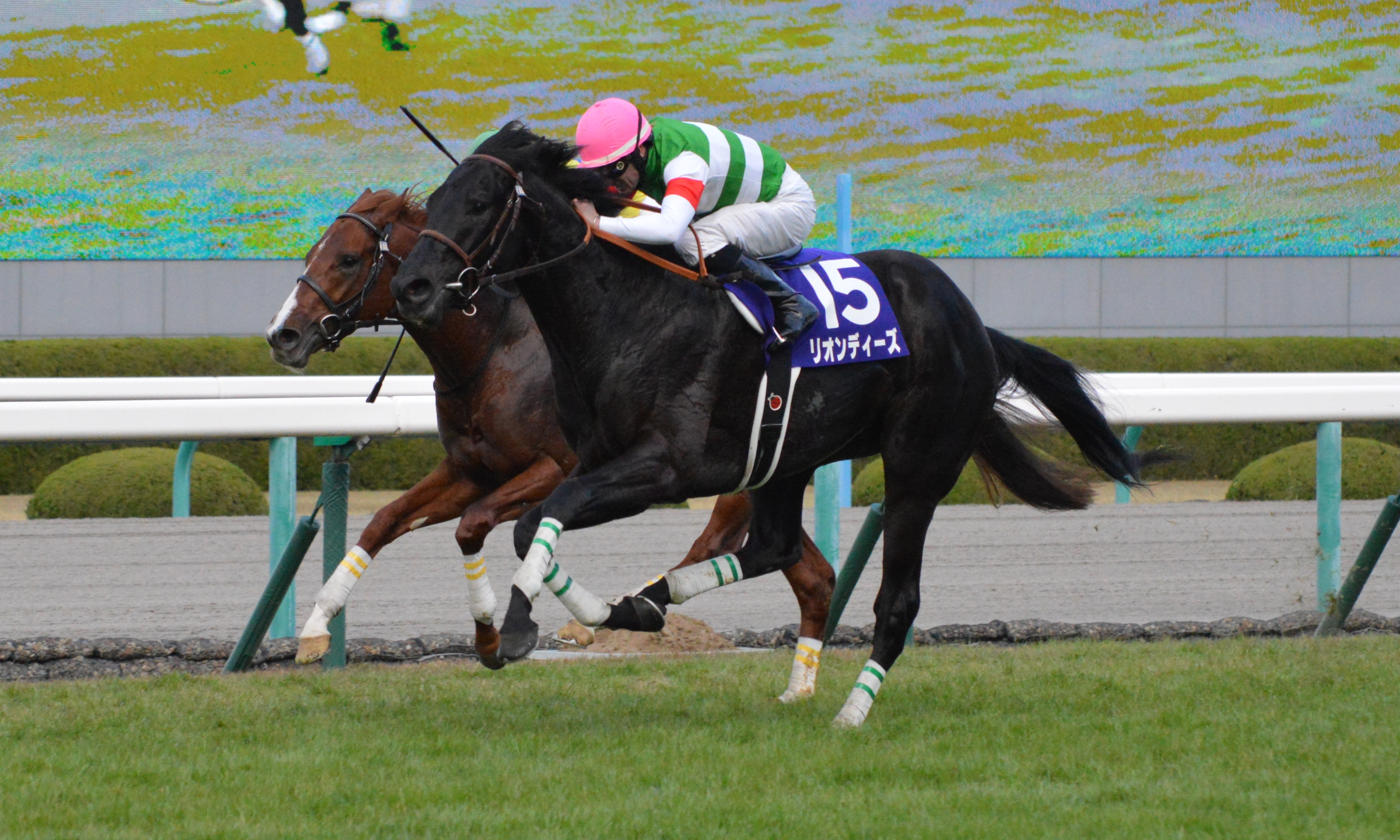
Leontes

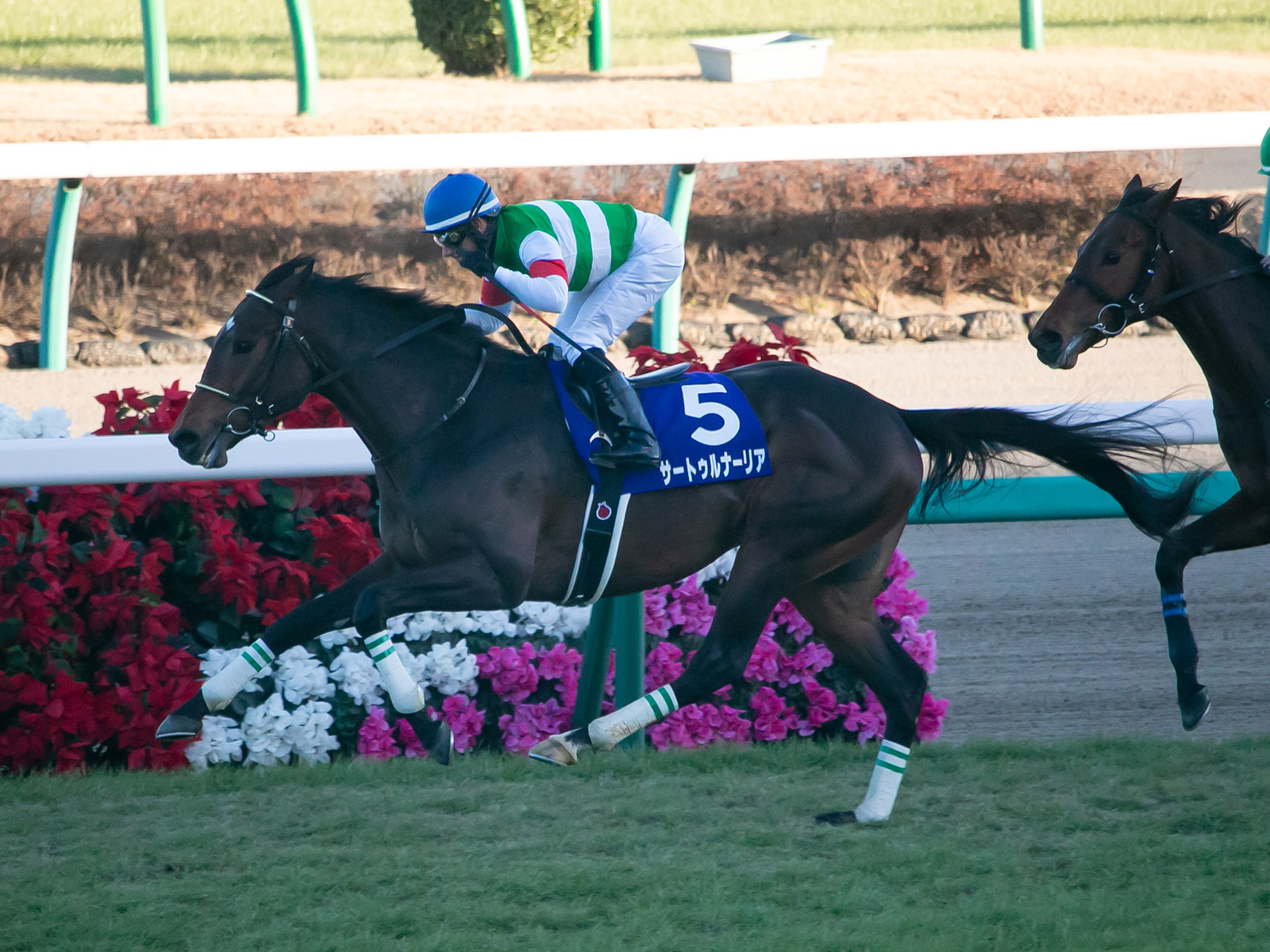
Saturnalia

=== Death ===
On February 27, 2021, Cesario died of hemorrhagic shock caused by arterial rupture in uterus during pregnancy.

== In popular culture ==
Standee of Cesario from Umamusume at Santa Anita Park in 2026

An anthropomorphized version of Cesario appears as a character in the Japanese multimedia franchise Umamusume: Pretty Derby, voiced by Haruka Sato. She is depicted as having a stoic, determined, and masculine persona during races, but has a much more cheerful, feminine, and lighthearted demeanor around her friends, which is likely an allusion to her real-life namesake being a male alias assumed by Viola, the female protagonist of Twelfth Night. She dreams of becoming a teacher dedicated to nurturing future generations of students, which references her real-life counterpart's successful career as a broodmare following her retirement.

== Racing statistics ==
Below data is based on data available on JBIS Search, netkeiba.com, and Equibase.

Date	Age	Track	Race	Grade	Distance (Condition)	Entry	HN	Odds (Favored)	Finish	Time	Margins	Jockey	Winner (Runner-up)
Dec 25, 2004	2	Hanshin	2yo Newcomer		1,600 m (Firm)	16	10	4.2 (2)	1st	1:36.7	-0.2	Yuichi Fukunaga	(Dantsu Queen Bee)
Jan 9, 2005	3	Nakayama	Kanchiku Sho	ALW	2,000 m (Firm)	16	11	10.3 (4)	1st	2:01.6	-0.0	Yuichi Fukunaga	(Admire Fuji)
Mar 19, 2005	3	Nakayama	Flower Cup	3	1,800 m (Firm)	14	2	1.4 (1)	1st	1:49.0	-0.4	Yuichi Fukunaga	(Slew Rate)
Apr 10, 2005	3	Hanshin	Oka Sho	1	1,600 m (Firm)	18	7	3.9 (1)	2nd	1:33.5	0.0	Minoru Yoshida	Rhein Kraft
May 22, 2005	3	Tokyo	Yushun Himba	1	2,400 m (Firm)	18	4	1.5 (1)	1st	2:28.8	-0.0	Yuichi Fukunaga	(Air Messiah)
Jul 3, 2005	3	Hollywood Park	American Oaks	1	1 1/4 mi (Firm) (Note: The distance of American Oaks is approximately 2,000 meters)	12	13	5.4 (2)	1st	1:59.03	--	Yuichi Fukunaga	(Melhor Ainda)

Legend:
Turf

== Pedigree ==
Pedigree of Cesario (JPN), black mare 2002
Sire Special Week (JPN) 1995	Sunday Silence (USA); 1987	Halo	Hail to Reason
Sire Special Week (JPN) 1995	Sunday Silence (USA); 1987	Halo	Cosmah
Sire Special Week (JPN) 1995	Sunday Silence (USA); 1987	Wishing Well	Understanding
Sire Special Week (JPN) 1995	Sunday Silence (USA); 1987	Wishing Well	Mountain Flower
Sire Special Week (JPN) 1995	Campaign Girl (JPN); 1987	Maruzensky	Nijinsky
Sire Special Week (JPN) 1995	Campaign Girl (JPN); 1987	Maruzensky	Shill
Sire Special Week (JPN) 1995	Campaign Girl (JPN); 1987	Lady Shiraoki	Saint Crespin
Sire Special Week (JPN) 1995	Campaign Girl (JPN); 1987	Lady Shiraoki	Miss Ashiyagawa
Dam Kirov Premiere (GB) 1990	Sadler's Wells (USA); 1981	Northern Dancer	Nearctic
Dam Kirov Premiere (GB) 1990	Sadler's Wells (USA); 1981	Northern Dancer	Natalma
Dam Kirov Premiere (GB) 1990	Sadler's Wells (USA); 1981	Fairy Bridge	Bold Reason
Dam Kirov Premiere (GB) 1990	Sadler's Wells (USA); 1981	Fairy Bridge	Special
Dam Kirov Premiere (GB) 1990	Querida (IRE); 1975	Habitat	Sir Gaylord
Dam Kirov Premiere (GB) 1990	Querida (IRE); 1975	Habitat	Little Hut
Dam Kirov Premiere (GB) 1990	Querida (IRE); 1975	Principia	Le Fabuleux
Dam Kirov Premiere (GB) 1990	Querida (IRE); 1975	Principia	Pia

== See also ==
- List of racehorses
