= Fuchu Himba Stakes =

Fuchu Himba Stakes 府中牝馬ステークス
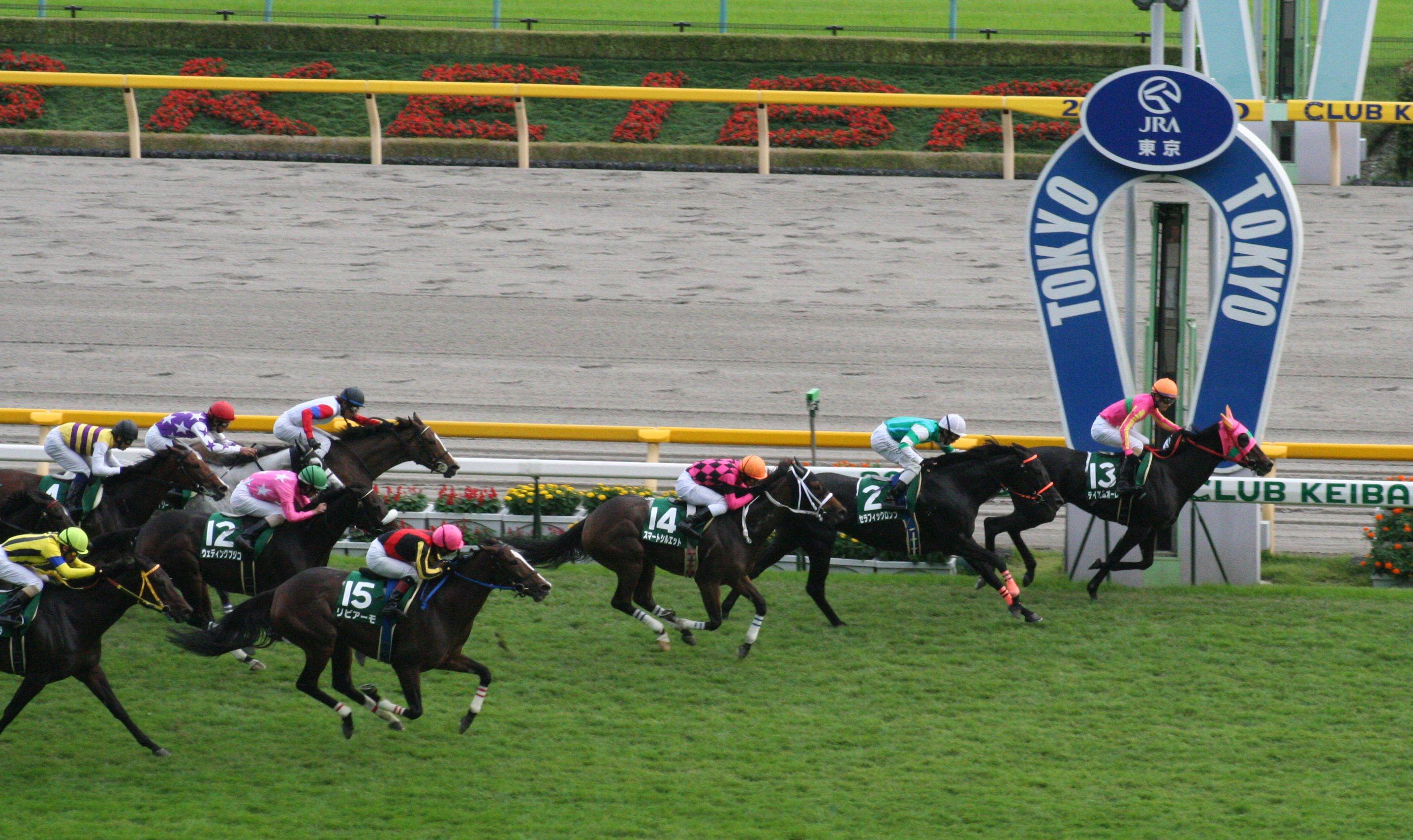
- 2010 Fuchu Himba Stakes
- Class: Grade 3
- Location: Tokyo Racecourse
- Inaugurated: 1984
- Race type: Thoroughbred Flat racing

Race information
- Distance: 1,800 meters
- Surface: Turf
- Track: Left-handed
- Qualification: 3-y-o + fillies and mares
- Weight: Special Weight
- Purse: ¥ 82,380,000 (as of 2025): 1st: ¥ 38,000,000; 2nd: ¥ 15,000,000; 3rd: ¥ 10,000,000

The Fuchu Himba Stakes (Japanese 府中牝馬ステークス) is a Japanese Grade 3 horse race for Thoroughbred fillies and mares aged three and over run in June over a distance of 1,800 meters at Tokyo Racecourse.

It was first run in 1953 and was promoted to Grade 3 in 1984 before being run as a Group 2 race since 2011. The race was usually contested over 1,600 meters before being moved up to 1,800 meters in 1996. The race used to serve as a trial for the Queen Elizabeth II Cup, with the winner awarded an entry slot for the race from 2014 to 2024. In 2025, with the creation of the Ireland Trophy and discontinuation of the Mermaid Stakes, the race schedule was moved from October to June, downgraded to Grade 3, and lost its Queen Elizabeth II Cup trial status.

== Weight ==
53 kg for three-year-olds, 55 kg for four-year-olds and above.

Allowances:

- 2 kg for southern hemisphere bred three-year-olds

Penalties (excluding two-year-old race performance):

- If a graded stakes race has been won within a year:
  - 2 kg for a grade 1 win
  - 1 kg for a grade 2 win
- If a graded stakes race has been won for more than a year:
  - 1 kg for a grade 1 win

== Winners since 2000 ==
Year	Winner	Age	Jockey	Trainer	Owner	Time
2000	To The Victory	4	Hirofumi Shii	Yasuo Ikee	Makoto Kaneko	1:48.3
2001	Maruka Candy	5	Yuichi Fukunaga	Shuji Kitahashi	Kawacho Sangyo	1:45.6
2002	Diamond Biko	4	Kazuhiro Kato	Kazuo Fujisawa	Shinobu Osako	1:46.0 ^{[1]}
2003	Lady Pastel	5	Masayoshi Ebina	Kiyotaka Tanaka	Lord Horse Club	1:46.6
2004	Osumi Haruka	4	Shinji Kawashima	Masatoshi Ando	Hidenori Yamaji	1:46.2
2005	Yamanin Alabaster	4	Teruo Eda	Shinobu Hoshino	Hajime Doi	1:46.7
2006	Daring Heart	4	Hiroki Goto	Hideaki Fujiwara	Shadai Race Horse	1:47.5
2007	Daring Heart	5	Shinji Fujita	Hideaki Fujiwara	Shadai Race Horse	1:45.4
2008	Blumenblatt	5	Yutaka Yoshida	Sei Ishizaka	Carrot Farm	1:45.5
2009	Mood Indigo	4	Katsuharu Tanaka	Yasuo Tomomichi	Kaneko Makoto Holdings	1:44.6
2010	T M Aurora	4	Kyosuke Kokubun	Tadao Igarashi	Masatsugu Takezono	1:46.4
2011	Italian Red	5	Eiji Nakadate	Sei Ishizaka	Tokyo Horse Racing	1:46.8
2012	Meine Isabel	4	Masami Matsuoka	Takahiro Mizuno	Thoroughbred Club Ruffian	1:45.5
2013	Whale Capture	5	Masayoshi Ebina	Kiyotaka Tanaka	Masaru Shimada	1:48.8
2014	Dia De La Madre	4	Kota Fujioka	Katsuhiko Sumii	Carrot Farm	1:45.7
2015	Nobori Diana	5	Christophe Lemaire	Masahiro Matsunaga	Yutaka Harada	1:46.3
2016	Queens Ring	4	Mirco Demuro	Keiji Yoshimura	Chizu Yoshida	1:46.6
2017	Crocosmia	4	Yasunari Iwata	Katsuichi Nishiura	Ryoichi Otsuka	1:48.1
2018	Deirdre	4	Christophe Lemaire	Mitsuru Hashida	Toji Morita	1:44.7
2019	Scarlet Color	4	Yasunari Iwata	Ryo Takahashi	Koji Maeda	1:44.5
2020	Salacia	5	Yuichi Kitamura	Manabu Ikezoe	Silk Racing	1:48.5
2021	Shadow Diva	5	Yuichi Fukunaga	Makoto Saito	Three H Racing	1:45.6
2022	Izu Jo No Kiseki	5	Yasunari Iwata	Koichi Ishizaka	Ichiro Izumi	1:44.5
2023	Divina	5	Mirco Demuro	Yasuo Tomomichi	Kazuhiro Sasaki	1:46.1
2024	Brede Weg	4	Christophe Lemaire	Keisuke Miyata	Sunday Racing	1:44.7
2025	Sekitoba East	4	Suguru Hamanaka	Hirofumi Shii	TN Racing	1:46.0
2026	Sekitoba East	5	Suguru Hamanaka	Hirofumi Shii	TN Racing	1:45.5

^{1} The 2002 race took place at Nakayama Racecourse.

== Earlier winners ==
- 1953 - Cheerio
- 1954 - My Dream
- 1955 - Tosei
- 1956 - Spring Sun
- 1957 - Mitsuru
- 1958 - Tajima
- 1959 - Hata Ford
- 1960 - Violet
- 1961 - Kuriban
- 1962 - Kikuno Hata
- 1963 - Hindo Thonella
- 1964 - Flower Wood
- 1965 - Flower Wood
- 1966 - Kiyotomi
- 1967 - Kiyozuki
- 1968 - Hakusetsu
- 1969 - Sweet Flag
- 1970 - Harbor Game
- 1971 - Tomei
- 1972 - Toku Zakura
- 1973 - Rinne Rund
- 1974 - Kamino Chidori
- 1975 - Anselmo
- 1976 - Bellona Sport
- 1977 - Seine Sport
- 1978 - Model Sport
- 1979 - Sunny Flower
- 1980 - Juji Arrow
- 1981 - Brocade
- 1982 - Sweet Native
- 1983 - Danish Girl
- 1984 - Dyna Mina
- 1985 - Western Five
- 1986 - Dyna Fairy
- 1987 - Love Chic Blues
- 1988 - Dyna Artemis
- 1989 - Louisiana Pit
- 1990 - Hikaru Dancer
- 1991 - Restoration
- 1992 - Janis
- 1993 - North Flight
- 1994 - Hokkai Seres
- 1995 - Samani Beppin
- 1996 - Sakura Candle
- 1997 - Kurokami
- 1998 - Mejiro Dober
- 1999 - Erimo Excel

== See also ==
- Horse racing in Japan
- List of Japanese flat horse races
