= Fillies' Revue =

Horse race in Japan

Fillies' Revue フィリーズレビュー
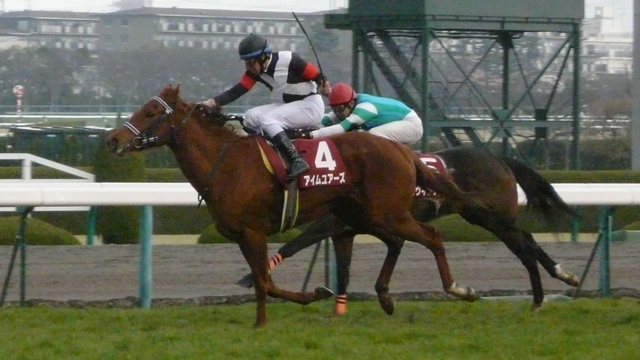
- I'm Yours wins the 2013 Fillies' Revue
- Class: Grade 2
- Location: Hanshin Racecourse, Takarazuka, Hyogo.
- Inaugurated: 1967
- Race type: Thoroughbred Flat racing

Race information
- Distance: 1400 metres
- Surface: Turf
- Track: Right-handed
- Qualification: 3-y-o fillies
- Weight: 55 kg
- Purse: ¥ 112,520,000 (as of 2025): 1st: ¥ 52,000,000; 2nd: ¥ 21,000,000; 3rd: ¥ 13,000,000

The Fillies' Revue (Japanese フィリーズレビュー) is a Grade 2 flat horse race in Japan for three-year-old Thoroughbred fillies run over a distance of 1,400 metres at Hanshin Racecourse, Takarazuka, Hyogo. The race is run in March and serves as a major trial race for the Oka Sho. The top three horses in the race earn the right to race at Oka Sho

It was first run in 1967. The race was run at Tokyo Racecourse in 1972. Among the winners of the race have been Meisho Mambo and the Oka Sho winners Hide Kotobuki, Tesco Gaby, Brocade, Mejiro Ramonu, Kyoei March, Rhein Kraft.

== Winners since 2000 ==
Year	Winner	Jockey	Trainer	Owner	Time
2000	Saiko Kirara	Shigeru Ishiyama	Mitsumasa Hamada	Nakamura	1:23.0
2001	Rosebud	Futoshi Komaki	Kojiro Hashiguchi	Shadai Race Horse	1:21.7
2002	Success Beauty	Shinji Fujita	Kenji Yamaguchi	Tetsu Takashima	1:21.6
2003	Yamakatsu Lily	Katsumi Ando	Shigeki Matsumoto	Hiroyasu Yamada	1:22.7
2004	Move of Sunday	Katsumi Ando	Shigeki Matsumoto	Shadai Race Horse	1:21.3
2005	Rhein Kraft	Yuichi Fukunaga	Tsutomu Setoguchi	Shigemasa Osawa	1:21.2
2006	Daiwa Passion	Hiroshi Hasegawa	Sueo Masuzawa	Keizo Oshiro	1:23.0
2007	Aston Machan	Yutaka Take	Sei Ishizaka	Mayumi Tosa	1:21.8
2008	Meine Ratsel	Kenichi Ikezoe	Tadao Igarashi	Thoroughbred Club Ruffian	1:22.5
2009	One Carat	Yusuke Fujioka	Kenichi Fujioka	Yoichi Aoyama	1:22.4
2010	Sound Barrier	Kunihiko Watanabe	Akio Adachi	Yuichi Masuda	1:22.8
2011	French Cactus	Hiroshi Kitamura	Masahiro Otake	Hidaka Breeders Union	1:22.3
2012	I'm Yours	Nicola Pinna	Takahisa Tezuka	Your Story	1:22.8
2013	Meisho Mambo	Yuga Kawada	Ahihiro Iida	Yoshio Matsumoto	1:22.1
2014	Bel Canto	Yutaka Take	Koichi Tsunoda	North Hills	1:22.3
2015	Queens Ring	Mirco Demuro	Keiji Yoshimura	Tetsuya Yoshida	1:22.5
2016	Solveig	Yuga Kawada	Ippo Sameshima	G1 Racing	1:22.1
2017	Karakurenai	Mirco Demuro	Takeshi Matsushita	Teruya Yoshida	1:21.0
2018	Liberty Heights	Yuichi Kitamura	Tomokazu Takano	Shadai Race Horse	1:21.5
2019	No One (DH)	Ryusei Sakai	Kazuhide Sasada	Yoshinori Fujita	1:22.0
2019	Pourville (DH)	Shinichiro Akiyama	Yasushi Shono	Tetsuya Yoshida	1:22.0
2020	Epos	Yasunari Iwata	Yoshihito Kitade	Fujiwara Farm	1:21.0
2021	Shigeru Pink Ruby	Ryuji Wada	Kunihiko Watanabe	Shigeru Morinaka	1:20.7
2022	Sublime Anthem	Kenichi Ikezoe	Hideaki Fujiwara	Sunday Racing	1:19.9
2023	Sing That Song	Hayato Yoshida	Tomokazu Takano	Shadai Race Horse	1:20.7
2024	Etes Vous Prets	Yusuke Fujioka	Kenichi Fujioka	Mohammed bin Rashid Al Maktoum	1:20.1
2025	Shonan Xanadu	Kenichi Ikezoe	Takeshi Matsushita	Tetsuhide Kunimoto	1:20.7
2026	Ghillies' Ball	Koji Nishizuka	Takahisa Tezuka	U.Carrot Farm	1:20.6

== Earlier winners ==
- 1967 - Yama Pit
- 1968 - Fine Rose
- 1969 - Hide Kotobuki
- 1970 - Tamami Karim
- 1971 - Erimo Jenny
- 1972 - Shimmoedake
- 1973 - Nitto Chidori
- 1974 - Ebisu All
- 1975 - Tesco Gaby
- 1976 - Squash Tholon
- 1977 - Daiwa Tesco
- 1978 - San M Jo O
- 1979 - Sea Bird Park
- 1980 - Shadai Dancer
- 1981 - Brocade
- 1982 - Tsuki Marie
- 1983 - Das Genie
- 1984 - Dyna Sugar
- 1985 - Erebus
- 1986 - Mejiro Ramonu
- 1987 - Kosei
- 1988 - Scarlet Ribbon
- 1989 - Kokusai Liebe
- 1990 - Eishin Sunny
- 1991 - Isono Roubles
- 1992 - Disco Hall
- 1993 - Yamahisa Laurel
- 1994 - Golden Jack
- 1995 - Raiden Leader
- 1996 - Little Audrey
- 1997 - Kyoei March
- 1998 - Max Can Do
- 1999 - Fusaichi Airedale

== See also ==
- Horse racing in Japan
- List of Japanese flat horse races
