= Ōka Shō =

Japanese horse race

Ōka Shō Japanese 1,000 Guineas 桜花賞
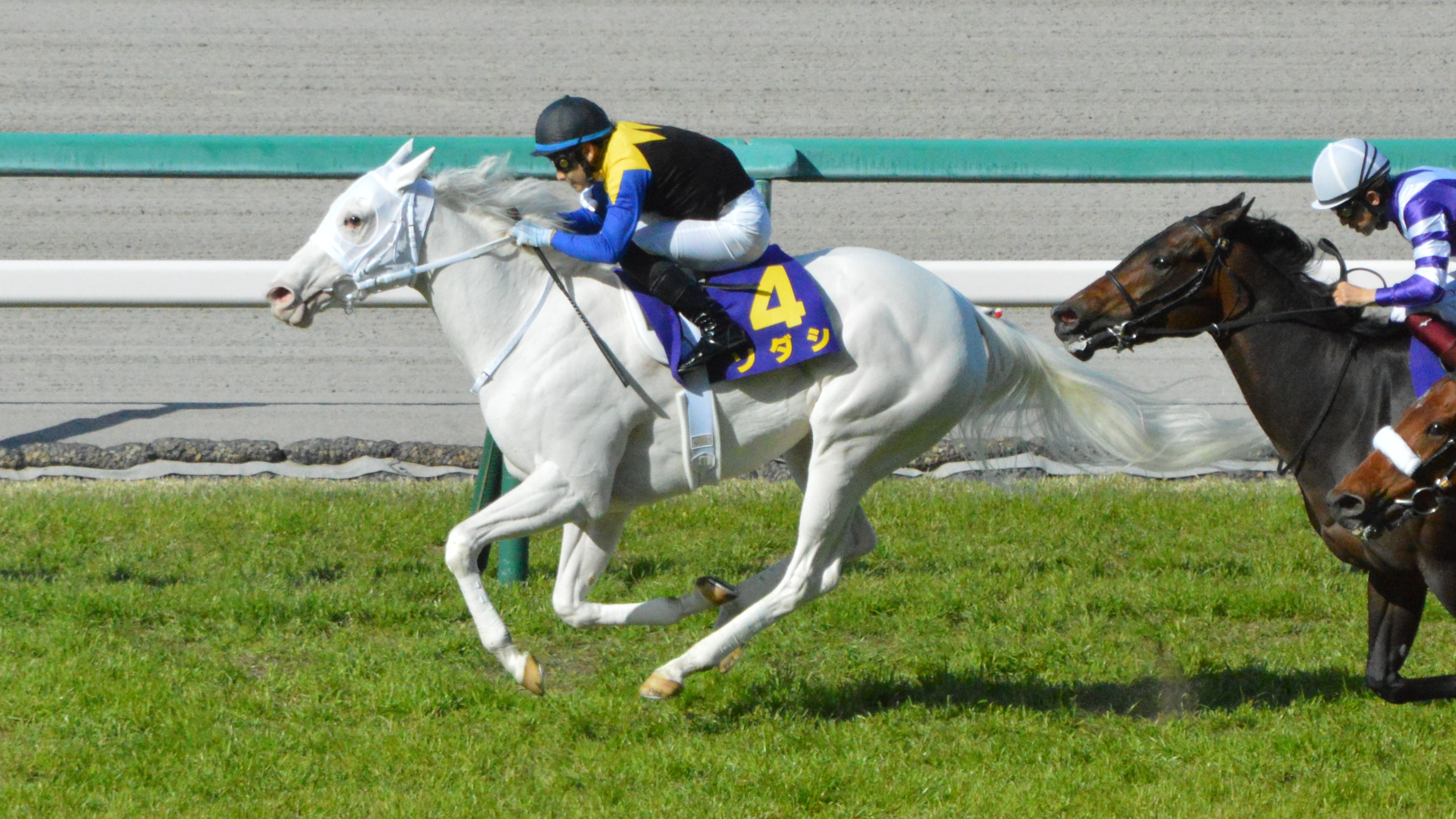
- 2021 Ōka Shō winner Sodashi
- Class: Grade 1
- Location: Hanshin Racecourse, Takarazuka, Hyōgo
- Inaugurated: April 9, 1939
- Race type: Thoroughbred Flat racing

Race information
- Distance: 1600 meters
- Surface: Turf
- Track: Right-handed (outer course)
- Qualification: 3-y-o, Fillies
- Weight: 55 kg
- Purse: ¥ 302,400,000 (as of 2025): 1st: ¥ 140,000,000; 2nd: ¥ 56,000,000; 3rd: ¥ 35,000,000
- Bonuses: Fillies Triple Crown; Winner of Ōka Shō, Yushun Himba, Shuka Sho ¥ 100,000,000

The Ōka Shō (桜花賞) is a Grade 1 flat horse race in Japan. The race is restricted to three-year-old Thoroughbred fillies and is run over a distance of 1,600 metres (approximately 1 mile) at Hanshin Racecourse in Takarazuka, Hyōgo. Run in early April, it is the traditional start to the annual classic races for three-year-olds in Japan.

The Ōka Shō was first contested in 1939 as Nakayama Yonsai Himba Tokubetsu (中山四歳牝馬特別) over a distance of 1,800 metres at Nakayama Racecourse, and is the Japanese equivalent of the English 1,000 Guineas.

The race was run at Nakayama Racecourse until 1944 when it was run at Tokyo Racecourse. After a two-year hiatus, the race was renamed to the Ōka Shō in 1947 and it was staged at Kyoto Racecourse over a distance of 1,600 metres from 1947 to 1949, then settled at Hanshin Racecourse since 1950. The race was also run at Kyoto in 1967, 1991 and 1995.

It is one of Japan's five Classic races, and the first of two restricted to fillies. It can also serve as the opening leg of the Japanese Triple Tiara, followed by the Yushun Himba (Japanese Oaks) and the Shuka Sho.

Winners of the Ōka Shō usually go on to contest the Yushun Himba, run in May, and the double has been completed by Swee Sue, Yamaichi, Miss Onward, Kane Keyaki, Tesco Gaby, Titania, Mejiro Ramonu, Max Beauty, Vega, Still In Love, Buena Vista, Apapane, Gentildonna, Almond Eye, Daring Tact, Stars On Earth and Liberty Island. Still In Love, Apapane, Gentildonna, Almond Eye, Daring Tact and Liberty Island also went on to take the Shuka Sho and secure the Japanese Triple Tiara, whereas Mejiro Ramonu became the only mare who won the Japanese Triple Tiara by winning its original third leg, the Queen Elizabeth II Cup.

== Trial races ==
Trial races provide automatic berths to the winning horses or placed horses as specified.

Race	Grade	Racecourse	Distance	Condition
Tulip Sho	GII	Hanshin	1,600 meters	Top 3 horses
Anemone Stakes	Listed	Nakayama	1,600 meters	Top 2 horses
Fillies' Revue	GII	Hanshin	1,400 meters	Top 3 horses

== Other step races ==
Races listed below does not provide automatic berths, but still important steps for this race.

Race	Grade	Racecourse	Distance
Fairy Stakes	GIII	Nakayama	1,600 meters
Kobai Stakes	Listed	Kyoto	1,400 meters
Elfin Stakes	Listed	Kyoto	1,600 meters
Queen Cup	GIII	Tokyo	1,600 meters
Flower Cup	GIII	Nakayama	1,800 meters

== Winners since 1990 ==
Year	Winner	Jockey	Trainer	Owner	Time
1990	Agnes Flora	Hiroshi Kawachi	Hiroyuki Nagahama	Takao Watanabe	1:37.1
1991	Sister Tosho	Koichi Tsunoda	Akio Tsurudome	Masaaki Fujita	1:33.7
1992	Nishino Flower	Hiroshi Kawachi	Masahiro Matsuda	Masayuki Nishiyama	1:37.5
1993	Vega	Yutaka Take	Hiroyushi Matsuda	Kazuko Yoshida	1:37.2
1994	Oguri Roman	Yutaka Take	Tsutomu Setoguchi	Koichi Oguri	1:36.4
1995	Wonder Perfume	Seiki Tabara	Masazo Ryoke	Nobuyuki Yamamoto	1:34.4
1996	Fight Gulliver	Seiki Tabara	Kentaro Nakao	Noboru Shinagawa	1:34.4
1997	Kyoei March	Mikio Matsunaga	Akihiko Nomura	M Matsuoka	1:36.9
1998	Phalaenopsis	Yutaka Take	Mitsumasa Hamada	North Hills Management Co	1:34.0
1999	Primo Ordine	Yuichi Fukunaga	Toyoji Nishihashi	Hidekazu Date	1:35.5
2000	Cheers Grace	Mikio Matsunaga	Kenji Yamauchi	Kazue Kitamura	1:34.9
2001	T. M. Ocean	Masaru Honda	Katsuichi Nishiura	Masatsugu Takezono	1:34.4
2002	Arrow Carry	Kenichi Ikezoe	Kenji Yamauchi	Hideharu Yano	1:34.3
2003	Still in Love	Hideaki Miyuki	Shoichi Matsumoto	North Hills Management Co.	1:33.9
2004	Dance in the Mood	Yutaka Take	Kazuo Fujisawa	Shadai Racehorse co.	1:33.6
2005	Rhein Kraft	Yuichi Fukunaga	Tsutomu Setoguchi	Shigemasa Ōsawa	1:33.5
2006	Kiss to Heaven	Katsumi Andō	Hirofumi Toda	Kazuko Yoshida	1:34.6
2007	Daiwa Scarlet	Katsumi Andō	Kunihide Matsuda	Keizo Ōshiro	1:33.7
2008	Reginetta	Futoshi Komaki	Hidekazu Asami	Shadai Racehorse	1:34.4
2009	Buena Vista	Katsumi Andō	Hiroyoshi Matsuda	Sunday Racing.	1:34.0
2010	Apapane	Masayoshi Ebina	Sakae Kunieda	Kaneko Makoto Holdings	1:33.3
2011	Marcellina	Katsumi Andō	Hiroyoshi Matsuda	Shadai Racehorse co.	1:33.9
2012	Gentildonna	Yasunari Iwata	Sei Ishizaka	Sunday Racing Co. Ltd	1:34.6
2013	Ayusan	Cristian Demuro	Takahisa Tezuka	Juichi Hoshin	1:35.0
2014	Harp Star	Yuga Kawada	Hiroyoshi Matsuda	U Carrot Farm	1:33.3
2015	Let's Go Donki	Yasunari Iwata	Tomoyuki Umeda	Toshihiro Hirosaki	1:36.0
2016	Jeweler	Mirco Demuro	Kenichi Fujioka	Yoichi Aoyama	1:33.4
2017	Reine Minoru	Kenichi Ikezoe	Masaru Honda	Minoru Yoshioka	1:34.5
2018	Almond Eye	Christophe Lemaire	Sakae Kunieda	Silk Racing	1:33.1
2019	Gran Alegria	Christophe Lemaire	Kazuo Fujisawa	Sunday Racing	1:32.7
2020	Daring Tact	Kohei Matsuyama	Haruki Sugiyama	Normandy Thoroughbred Racing	1:36.1
2021	Sodashi	Hayato Yoshida	Naosuke Sugai	Kaneko Makoto Holdings	1:31.1 (Note: Set the current race record)
2022	Stars On Earth	Yuga Kawada	Mizuki Takayanagi	Shadai Racehorse co.	1:32.9
2023	Liberty Island	Yuga Kawada	Mitsumasa Nakauchida	Sunday Racing	1:32.1
2024	Stellenbosch	João Moreira	Sakae Kunieda	Katsumi Yoshida	1:32.2
2025	Embroidery	João Moreira	Kazutomo Mori	Silk Racing	1:33.1
2026	Star Anise	Kohei Matsuyama	Tomokazu Takano	Katsumi Yoshida	1:31.5

== Earlier winners ==
- 1939 - Soul Lady
- 1940 - Tairei
- 1941 - Brand Sol
- 1942 - Banner Goal
- 1943 - Miss Theft
- 1944 - Yamaiwai
- 1945 - no race
- 1946 - no race
- 1947 - Browny
- 1948 - Hamakaze
- 1949 - Yashima Daughter
- 1950 - Tosa Mitsuru
- 1951 - Tsuki Kawa
- 1952 - Swee Sue
- 1953 - Kansei
- 1954 - Yamaichi
- 1955 - Yashima Belle
- 1956 - Miss Lilas
- 1957 - Miss Onward
- 1958 - Hoshu Queen
- 1959 - Kiyo Take
- 1960 - Tokino Kiroku
- 1961 - Sugi Hime
- 1962 - Kenho
- 1963 - Miss Masako
- 1964 - Kane Keyaki
- 1965 - Hatsuyuki
- 1966 - Wakakumo
- 1967 - Sea Ace
- 1968 - Koyu
- 1969 - Hide Kotobuki
- 1970 - Tamami
- 1971 - Nasuno Kaori
- 1972 - Achieve Star
- 1973 - Nitto Chodori
- 1974 - Takaeno Kaori
- 1975 - Tesco Gaby
- 1976 - Titania
- 1977 - Inter Gloria
- 1978 - Oyama Tesco
- 1979 - Horsemen Tesco
- 1980 - Hagino Top Lady
- 1981 - Brocade
- 1982 - Riesengross
- 1983 - Shadai Sophia
- 1984 - Diana Tholon
- 1985 - Erebus
- 1986 - Mejiro Ramonu
- 1987 - Max Beauty
- 1988 - Ara Hotoku
- 1989 - Shadai Kagura

== See also ==
- Horse racing in Japan
- List of Japanese flat horse races
