= Phalaenopsis (horse) =

Japanese Thoroughbred racehorse (1995–2016)

Phalaenopsis ファレノプシス
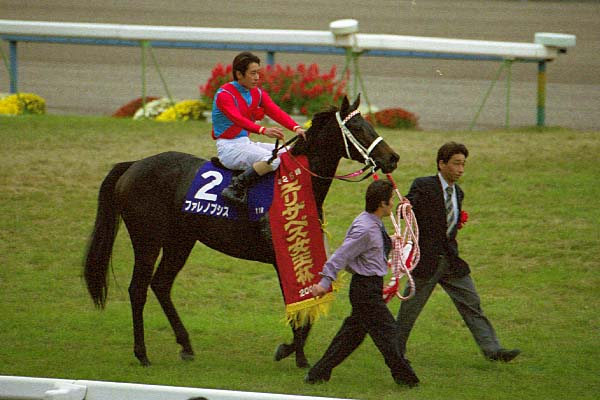
- Phalaenopsis after winning the 2000 Queen Elizabeth II Cup
- Breed: Thoroughbred
- Sire: Brian's Time (USA)
- Grandsire: Roberto (USA)
- Dam: Catequil (CAN)
- Damsire: Storm Cat (USA)
- Sex: Mare
- Foaled: April 4, 1995
- Died: July 1, 2016 (aged 21)
- Country: Japan
- Color: Dark bay
- Breeder: Maeko Farm Co. Ltd.
- Owner: North Hills Management Co. Ltd.
- Racing colors
- Trainer: Mitsumasa Hamada
- Jockey: Shigeru Ishiyama; Yutaka Take; Mikio Matsunaga; Masayoshi Ebina; Shigefumi Kumazawa
- Record: 16: 7-1-1
- Earnings: ¥466,510,000

Major wins
- Rose Stakes (1998); Queen Elizabeth II Cup (2000); Japanese Classic Tiara Race wins: Oka Sho (1998); Shuka Sho (1998)

Awards
- JRA Award for Best Three-Year-Old Filly (1998); JRA Award for Best Older Filly or Mare (2000)

Phalaenopsis (Japanese: ファレノプシス, Hepburn: Farenopushisu; April 4, 1995 – July 1, 2016) was a Japanese Thoroughbred racehorse and broodmare. She won the 1998 Oka Sho and Shuka Sho, as well as the 2000 Queen Elizabeth II Cup, among other races. She was named the JRA Award for Best Three-Year-Old Filly in 1998 and the JRA Award for Best Older Filly or Mare in 2000. Her name comes from the phalaenopsis orchid.

== Background ==
Phalaenopsis was born on April 4, 1995, at Maeko Farm in Niikappu, Hokkaido. Her sire, Brian's Time, was a leading sire in Japan who sired foals such as Narita Brian and Mayano Top Gun. Her dam Catequil was the half-sister of Pacificus, who foaled the aforementioned Narita Brian as well as Biwa Hayahide.

Although she was the subject of high expectations even before her birth due to her pedigree, Phalaenopsis had a weak constitution from foalhood and suffered from a tendency to freeze up, making training difficult; she also struggled with reverse body temperature. Furthermore, her hindquarters were extremely underdeveloped, leading some to believe she might never become a racehorse.

However, Phalaenopsis' condition improved rapidly around the spring of her three-year-old year, and in September, she entered the Hamada stable at Ritto Training Center. Initially, Hamada was skeptical of her ability, but as training continued, the condition of her hindquarters improved, and she began to show excellent movement.

== Racing career ==
=== 1997–1998: three & four-year-old seasons ===
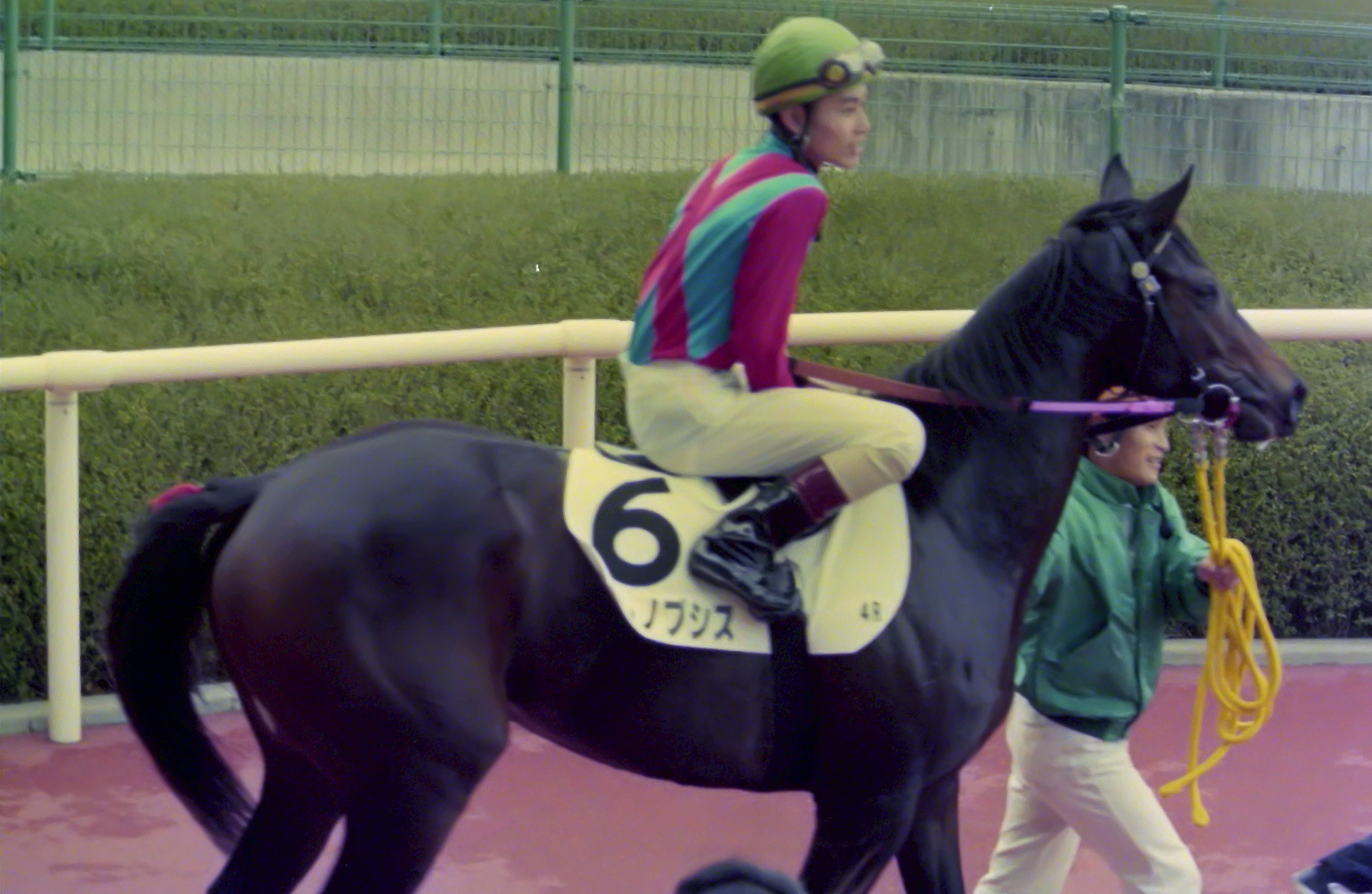
Phalaenopsis and her first jockey Shigeru Ishiyama after winning her maiden race.

On November 30, 1997, Phalaenopsis made her debut in a maiden race at Hanshin Racecourse. She was ridden by Shigeru Ishiyama, a young jockey from the Hamada stable. Out of consideration for the strain on her legs, she was entered in a dirt race, but she scored a decisive victory, finishing 9 lengths ahead of the runner-up in a time that set a new record for 2-year-olds. She followed that up with convincing wins in a conditions race and the Elfin Stakes, her first race of the new year. She was regarded as the top contender for the upcoming spring filly classics.

In March, Phalaenopsis made her first graded stakes appearance in the Tulip Sho, a trial race for the Oka Sho. She was the favorite, having beaten the previous year’s winner for the JRA Award for Best Three-Year-Old Filly, Ain Bride, and Dantsu Sirius, who had defeated the colts in the Shinzan Kinen. However, her weight had dropped to 414 kg, and after a slow start, she was boxed in by the pack from the middle of the race through the home stretch, finishing fourth behind Dantsu Sirius. In addition to her poor condition, it was determined that there had been a clear riding error, and Ishiyama was relieved of his duties after this race. Ahead of her first Classic race, the Oka Sho, Yutaka Take was brought in as her new jockey.

In the Oka Sho on April 12, she was the third favorite, and her condition had improved, with her weight up 10 kg from her previous race. In the race, she ran from the front of the middle pack and overtook London Bridge, who was holding on to the lead, in the home stretch to win. She achieved her first graded stakes victory in a Classic race. For Koji Maeda, the breeder and owner, this marked the first GI victory in the fourteen years since the ranch was founded.

In the Yushun Himba, where she aimed for the Classic double, there were concerns even before the race about her ability to handle the 2,400-meter distance. In the race, she was held back early and made a late charge down the stretch, but was unable to catch Erimo Excel and Air Deja Vu, finishing in third place. After the race, Take commented, "I didn’t think she’d handle the distance this well. It was a mistake," expressing regret that his cautious racing strategy, born of those concerns, had backfired.

Following Hamada’s instructions, she was not sent to pasture for the summer and remained at Ritto Training Center. She made her comeback on September 27 in the Rose Stakes, a trial race for the Shuka Sho, winning by taking the lead from the front, a complete reversal from her previous race. In the Shuka Sho, the final leg of the Fillies’ Triple Crown, she ceded the role of top favorite to Air Deja Vu, but after staying in the middle of the pack, she moved up alongside the leader entering the final turn and pushed ahead to win from the front all the way to the finish line, completing the Fillies’ Double Crown.

After the race, Hamada announced her entry into the Japan Cup, but due to concerns about her condition, she was withdrawn and entered a rest period. In January of the following year, she was named the JRA Award for Best Three-Year-Old Filly.

=== 1999–2000: five & six-year-old seasons ===
After a break, Phalaenopsis returned to racing in March of the following year. In the Yomiuri Milers Cup, she suffered a crushing defeat, finishing tenth. However, in her next start, the Keio Hai Spring Cup, she showed signs of a comeback by finishing 5th, just over a length behind the winner, Grass Wonder. However, while preparing for the Yasuda Kinen, she developed a fever and was sidelined.

Returning in the summer at the Sapporo Kinen, she finished second, half a length behind Seiun Sky, a double Classic winner from the same classic season. After a break, she competed in the Queen Elizabeth II Cup, her target for the fall, and was backed as the day’s favorite. However, he lost his path at a crucial point in the final straight and finished sixth. At the end of the year, she ran in the Arima Kinen, but suffered a crushing defeat, finishing eighth, bringing her season to a close.

Phalaenopsis continued her racing career into the following year, 2000. However, she had to withdraw from the February Stakes, which was scheduled to be her season opener, due to hives. In her subsequent return at the Yomiuri Milers Cup, she suffered a crushing defeat, finishing 10th, and subsequently developed leg problems after the race, forcing her to take a break. As in the previous year, she made her comeback in the Sapporo Kinen but finished seventh and developed fetlock inflammation after the race. Consequently, she headed straight to the Queen Elizabeth II Cup, just as she had the year before.

On November 12, she competed in the Queen Elizabeth II Cup. Her retirement had been announced following this race, and she entered the event in top form, described as “in peak condition.” With Mikio Matsunaga in the saddle and backed as the third favorite, she raced in fifth or sixth position amid a slow pace set by the second favorite, To the Victory. As they approached the final turn, she moved up to catch the front-runners, and in the home stretch, she overtook the tenacious Fusaichi Airedale just before the finish line to win by a half-length. This victory, her first in nearly two years since the Shuka Sho capped off her career.

On January 5 of the following year, a retirement ceremony was held at Kyoto Racecourse, where she made her final appearance for fans wearing the “No. 2” race number from the Queen Elizabeth II Cup. In keeping with her name, a lei woven from phalaenopsis orchids was draped over her during the commemorative photo session, and bouquets of phalaenopsis orchids were presented to those involved. That same month, in recognition of her victory in the Queen Elizabeth II Cup, she was named the JRA Award for Best Older Filly or Mare.

== Retirement ==
After her retirement, Phalaenopsis became a broodmare at her home stable, North Hills Management (now North Hills). She died on July 1, 2016, due to a subarachnoid hemorrhage.

=== Breeding record ===
The following list is based on information listed on JBIS-Search.

Year	Name	Sex	Coat	Sire	Owner	Trainer
2002	Spun Gold	Mare	Brown	Sunday Silence	North Hills Management	Mitsumasa Hamada (Ritto)
2003	Tinkle Heart	Mare	Brown	Sunday Silence	North Hills Management	Mitsumasa Hamada (Ritto)
2004	Lua Cheia	Mare	Dark Bay	Fuji Kiseki	North Hills Management →North Hills	Mitsumasa Hamada (Ritto) →Kazuya Nakatake (Ritto)
2005	Feuille	Mare	Chestnut	Dance in the Dark	North Hills Management	Hideyuki Mori (Ritto)
2006	A Diaphon	Mare	Dark Bay	Dance in the Dark	North Hills Management →North Hills	Kojiro Hashiguchi (Ritto)
2007	Ranunculus	Mare	Black	Special Week	North Hills Management →Koji Maeda	Yoshito Yahagi (Ritto)
2008	Not Foaled			Agnes Tachyon		
2009	Hourglass	Mare	Chestnut	Agnes Tachyon	North Hills	Kazuya Nakatake (Ritto)
2011	Cool Opening	Colt	Brown	Manhattan Cafe	Shinji Maeda	Kojiro Hashiguchi (Ritto) →Shinsuke Hashiguchi (Ritto)
2012	Climbing Rose	Mare	Brown	Manhattan Cafe	Koji Maeda	Koichi Tsunoda (Ritto)
2015	Vincent	Colt	Dark Bay	Heart's Cry	Koji Maeda	Shinsuke Hashiguchi (Ritto) →Masahiro Uesugi (Ohi)
2016	Reina Rosa	Mare	Dark Bay	Victoire Pisa	North Hills	Hisashi Shimizu (Ritto)

== In popular culture ==
An anthropomorphized version of Phalaenopsis appears as a character in the Japanese multimedia franchise Umamusume: Pretty Derby, by Haruna Asami. She is depicted as a resolute girl of the Junior Division who had a weak constitution in her childhood, but overcame it with the help from her training club and became a strong-willed racer. She is a childhood friend and cousin of Biwa Hayahide and Narita Brian, and roommates with Samson Big.

== Racing form ==
Date	Age	Racecourse	Race	Grade	Distance	Gate	Odds	Fav.	Fin.	Time	Margin	Jockey	Winner (Runner-Up)
Nov 30, 1997	3	Hanshin	Three-Year-Old Newcomer	Maiden	D 1200m	6	2.2	1	1st	1:11.5	-1.5	Shigeru Ishiyama	(Judi Urban)
Dec 14, 1997	3	Hanshin	Sazanka Sho	Pre-OP	T 1400m	15	1.8	1	1st	1:22.6	-0.4	Shigeru Ishiyama	(Amato Ben)
Feb 15, 1998	4	Kyoto	Elfin Stakes	OP	T 1600m	4	1.5	1	1st	1:36.6	-0.2	Shigeru Ishiyama	(Maruka Komachi)
Mar 7, 1998	4	Hanshin	Tulip Sho	G3	T 1600m	3	2.1	1	4th	1:37.2	0.3	Shigeru Ishiyama	Dantsu Sirius
Apr 12, 1998	4	Hanshin	Oka Sho	G1	T 1600m	9	6.2	3	1st	1:34.0	-0.2	Yutaka Take	(London Bridge)
May 31, 1998	4	Tokyo	Yushun Himba	G1	T 2400m	16	2.6	1	3rd	2:28.4	0.3	Yutaka Take	Erimo Excel
Sep 27, 1998	4	Hanshin	Rose Stakes	G2	T 2000m	5	1.6	1	1st	2:04.4	-0.1	Yutaka Take	(Biwa Good Luck)
Oct 25, 1998	4	Kyoto	Shuka Sho	G1	T 2000m	14	2.9	2	1st	2:02.4	-0.2	Yutaka Take	(Narita Luna Park)
Mar 7, 1999	5	Hanshin	Yomiuri Milers Cup	G2	T 1600m	12	6.2	5	10th	1:37.3	1.7	Mikio Matsunaga	Egao o Misete
May 15, 1999	5	Tokyo	Keio Hai Spring Cup	G2	T 1400m	6	10.5	6	5th	1:20.7	0.2	Yutaka Take	Grass Wonder
Aug 22, 1999	5	Sapporo	Sapporo Kinen	G2	T 2000m	8	5.6	2	2nd	2:00.2	0.1	Yutaka Take	Seiun Sky
Nov 14, 1999	5	Kyoto	Queen Elizabeth II Cup	G1	T 2200m	11	3.0	1	6th	2:13.8	0.3	Yutaka Take	Mejiro Dober
Dec 26, 1999	5	Nakayama	Arima Kinen	G1	T 2500m	12	68.8	9	8th	2:38.1	0.9	Masayoshi Ebina	Grass Wonder
Apr 15, 2000	6	Hanshin	Yomiuri Milers Cup	G2	T 1600m	8	10.3	5	10th	1:35.3	1.0	Shigefumi Kumazawa	Meiner Max
Aug 20, 2000	6	Sapporo	Sapporo Kinen	G2	T 2000m	3	2.7	1	7th	2:00.5	0.6	Mikio Matsunaga	Daiwa Caerleon
Nov 12, 2000	6	Kyoto	Queen Elizabeth II Cup	G1	T 2200m	2	6.4	3	1st	2:12.9	-0.1	Mikio Matsunaga	(Fusaichi Airedale)

== Pedigree ==
Pedigree of Phalaenopsis (JPN)
Sire Brian's Time (USA)	Roberto (USA)	Hail to Reason (USA)	Turn-to (IRE)
Sire Brian's Time (USA)	Roberto (USA)	Hail to Reason (USA)	Nothirdchance (USA)
Sire Brian's Time (USA)	Roberto (USA)	Bramalea (USA)	Nashua (USA)
Sire Brian's Time (USA)	Roberto (USA)	Bramalea (USA)	Rarelea (USA)
Sire Brian's Time (USA)	Kelley's Day (USA)	Graustark (USA)	Ribot (GB)
Sire Brian's Time (USA)	Kelley's Day (USA)	Graustark (USA)	Flower Bowl (USA)
Sire Brian's Time (USA)	Kelley's Day (USA)	Golden Trail (USA)	Hasty Road (USA)
Sire Brian's Time (USA)	Kelley's Day (USA)	Golden Trail (USA)	Sunny Vale (USA)
Dam Catequil (CAN)	Storm Cat (USA)	Storm Bird (CAN)	Northern Dancer (CAN)
Dam Catequil (CAN)	Storm Cat (USA)	Storm Bird (CAN)	South Ocean (CAN)
Dam Catequil (CAN)	Storm Cat (USA)	Terlingua (USA)	Secretariat (USA)
Dam Catequil (CAN)	Storm Cat (USA)	Terlingua (USA)	Crimson Saint (USA)
Dam Catequil (CAN)	Pacific Princess (USA)	Damascus (USA)	Sword Dancer (USA)
Dam Catequil (CAN)	Pacific Princess (USA)	Damascus (USA)	Kerala (USA)
Dam Catequil (CAN)	Pacific Princess (USA)	Fiji (GB)	Acropolis (GB)
Dam Catequil (CAN)	Pacific Princess (USA)	Fiji (GB)	Rififi (GB)

- Phalaenopsis' half-brothers Sunday Break (sired by Forty Niner) and Kizuna (sired by Deep Impact) won the 2002 Peter Pan Stakes and the 2013 Tokyo Yushun respectively.
- Phalaenopsis' dam Catequil is the half-sister of Pacificus, the dam of Biwa Hayahide and Narita Brian.
