= T. M. Ocean =

Japanese thoroughbred racehorse

T. M. Ocean テイエムオーシャン
- Sire: Dancing Brave
- Grandsire: Lyphard
- Dam: River Girl
- Damsire: Rivlia
- Sex: Mare
- Foaled: 9 April 1998 (age 28)
- Country: Japan
- Color: Bay (horse)
- Breeder: Toshiki Kawagoe
- Owner: Masatsugu Takezono
- Racing colors
- Trainer: Katsuichi Nishiura
- Jockey: Masaru Honda
- Record: 18: 7-1-4
- Earnings: 472,257,000 JPY

Major wins
- Hanshin Sansai Himba Stakes (2000); Tulip Sho (2001); Sapporo Kinen (2002); Japanese Classic Tiara Race wins: Oka Sho (2001); Shuka Sho (2001)

Awards
- JRA Award for Best Two-Year-Old Filly (2000); JRA Award for Best Three-Year-Old Filly (2001)

T. M. Ocean (Japanese: テイエムオーシャン, Hepburn: Tei Emu Ōshān; foaled 9 April 1998) is a Japanese thoroughbred racehorse and broodmare who won the Hanshin Juvenile Fillies in 2000 and swept two of the three crowns of the Japanese Triple Tiara in 2001, winning the Oka Sho and Shuka Sho. She was awarded the JRA Award for Best Two-Year-Old Filly and the JRA Award for Best Three-Year-Old Filly in the following year.

== Background ==
T. M. Ocean was a bay mare bred by Toshiki Kawagoe at Kawagoe Farm in Urakawa, Hokkaido. She was sired by Dancing Brave, winner of the 1986 2000 Guineas, Eclipse Stakes, King George VI and Queen Elizabeth Stakes, and Prix de l'Arc de Triomphe. Her dam River Girl was sired by Rivlia, who also sired the 1993 Satsuki Sho winner Narita Taishin. Her granddam Erebus was the 1985 Oka Sho winner.

Ten days after her birth, owner Masatsugu Takezono visited Kawagoe Farm. Upon seeing T. M. Ocean by chance, he noted that she was a small horse but looked like a promising runner. Despite the opposition of several trainers accompanying him, he still decided to purchase her.

== Racing record ==
T. M. Ocean won 7 out of 18 entries, placed second once, and third four times. This data is available in JBIS, and netkeiba.

Date	Racecourse	Race	Grade	Distance (Condition)	Entry	HN	Odds (Favoured)	Finish	Time	Margin	Jockey	Winner (Runner-up)
2000 – two-year-old season
5 Aug	Sapporo	2yo newcomer		1200m (Firm)	8	3	5.4 (3)	1st	1:10.6	2 1/2 lengths	Masaru Honda	(Win Radius)
26 Aug	Sapporo	Two-Year-Old 5,000,000 yen under	1-win	1200m (Soft)	14	4	1.6 (1)	1st	1:10.6	6 lengths	Masaru Honda	(Tax Shelter)
23 Sep	Sapporo	Sapporo Sansai Stakes	3	1800m (Firm)	13	3	2.5 (1)	3rd	1:49.9	(2 lengths)	Masaru Honda	Jungle Pocket
3 Dec	Hanshin	Hanshin Sansai Himba Stakes	1	1600m (Firm)	18	9	4.3(1)	1st	1:34.6	2 lengths	Masaru Honda	(Daiwa Rouge)
2001 – three-year-old season
3 Mar	Hanshin	Tulip Sho	3	1600m (Firm)	14	11	1.7 (1)	1st	1:35.3	4 lengths	Masaru Honda	(Point Flag)
8 Apr	Hanshin	Oka Sho	1	1600m (Firm)	18	8	1.3 (1)	1st	1:34.4	3 lengths	Masaru Honda	(Moonlight Tango)
20 May	Tokyo	Yushun Himba	1	2400m (Firm)	18	12	1.8 (1)	3rd	2:26.7	(2 1/2 lengths)	Masaru Honda	Lady Pastel
14 Oct	Kyoto	Shuka Sho	1	2000m (Firm)	18	2	2.4 (1)	1st	1:58.5	3/4 length	Masaru Honda	(Rosebud)
11 Nov	Kyoto	Queen Elizabeth II Commemorative Cup	1	2200m (Firm)	15	1	3.0 (1)	5th	2:11.3	(1/2 length)	Masaru Honda	To the Victory
23 Dec	Nakayama	Arima Kinen	1	2500m (Firm)	13	8	26.8 (8)	6th	2:33.5	(2 1/2 lengths)	Masaru Honda	Manhattan Cafe
2002 – four-year-old season
18 Aug	Sapporo	Sapporo Kinen	2	2000m (Firm)	16	14	5.1 (2)	1st	1:59.5	1 1/2 lengths	Masaru Honda	(Tokai Point)
27 Oct	Tokyo	Tenno Sho (Autumn)	1	2000m (Firm)	18	10	4.9 (1)	13th	1:59.5	(6 1/2 lengths)	Masaru Honda	Symboli Kris S
24 Nov	Nakayama	Japan Cup	1	2200m (Firm)	16	11	22.4 (10)	9th	2:13.0	(4 3/4 lengths)	Masaru Honda	Falbrav
23 Dec	Nakayama	Arima Kinen	1	2500m (Good)	14	5	33.2 (10)	10th	2:34.1	(9 3/4 lengths)	Masaru Honda	Symboli Kris S
2003 – five-year-old season
19 Apr	Hanshin	Yomiuri Milers Cup	2	1600m (Firm)	13	10	3.4 (2)	3rd	1:32.3	(2 3/4 lengths)	Masaru Honda	Lohengrin
31 May	Chukyo	Kinko Sho	2	2000m (Good)	14	13	5.2 (3)	9th	1:59.8	(5 1/4 lengths)	Masaru Honda	Tap Dance City
13 Jul	Hanshin	Mermaid Stakes	3	2000m (Soft)	10	2	2.9 (2)	2nd	2:04.3	(3 1/2 lengths)	Masaru Honda	Rosebud
17 Aug	Sapporo	Hokkaido Shimbun Hai Queen Stakes	3	1800m (Firm)	11	11	4.5 (1)	3rd	1:47.9	(1 length)	Masaru Honda	Osumi Haruka

Legend:
Turf

== Pedigree ==
Pedigree of T. M. Ocean (JPN), bay mare 1998
Sire Dancing Brave (USA) b. 1983	Lyphard (USA) b. 1969	Northern Dancer (CAN)	Nearctic (CAN)
Sire Dancing Brave (USA) b. 1983	Lyphard (USA) b. 1969	Northern Dancer (CAN)	Natalma (USA)
Sire Dancing Brave (USA) b. 1983	Lyphard (USA) b. 1969	Goofed (USA)	Court Martial (GB)
Sire Dancing Brave (USA) b. 1983	Lyphard (USA) b. 1969	Goofed (USA)	Barra (FR)
Sire Dancing Brave (USA) b. 1983	Navajo Princess (USA) b. 1974	Drone (USA)	Sir Gaylord (USA)
Sire Dancing Brave (USA) b. 1983	Navajo Princess (USA) b. 1974	Drone (USA)	Cap and Bells (USA)
Sire Dancing Brave (USA) b. 1983	Navajo Princess (USA) b. 1974	Olmec (USA)	Pago Pago (AUS)
Sire Dancing Brave (USA) b. 1983	Navajo Princess (USA) b. 1974	Olmec (USA)	Chocolate Beau (USA)
Dam River Girl (JPN) 1991 F. no: 12	Rivlia (USA); 1982	Riverman (FR); 1969	Never Bend (USA); 1960
Dam River Girl (JPN) 1991 F. no: 12	Rivlia (USA); 1982	Riverman (FR); 1969	River Lady (USA); 1963
Dam River Girl (JPN) 1991 F. no: 12	Rivlia (USA); 1982	Dahlia (USA); 1970	Vaguely Noble (IRE); 1965
Dam River Girl (JPN) 1991 F. no: 12	Rivlia (USA); 1982	Dahlia (USA); 1970	Charming Alibi (USA); 1963
Dam River Girl (JPN) 1991 F. no: 12	Erebus (JPN); 1982	Magnitude (IRE); 1975	Mill Reef (USA); 1968
Dam River Girl (JPN) 1991 F. no: 12	Erebus (JPN); 1982	Magnitude (IRE); 1975	Altesse Royale (IRE); 1968
Dam River Girl (JPN) 1991 F. no: 12	Erebus (JPN); 1982	Hokuei Ribbon(JPN)	Eagle (GB)
Dam River Girl (JPN) 1991 F. no: 12	Erebus (JPN); 1982	Hokuei Ribbon(JPN)	Queen Epolo (JPN)

- T. M. Ocean was an inbred by S4 x M5 to Court Martial and M4 x M5 to Never Bend
