= Daiwa Scarlet =

Japanese-bred Thoroughbred racehorse

Daiwa Scarlet ダイワスカーレット
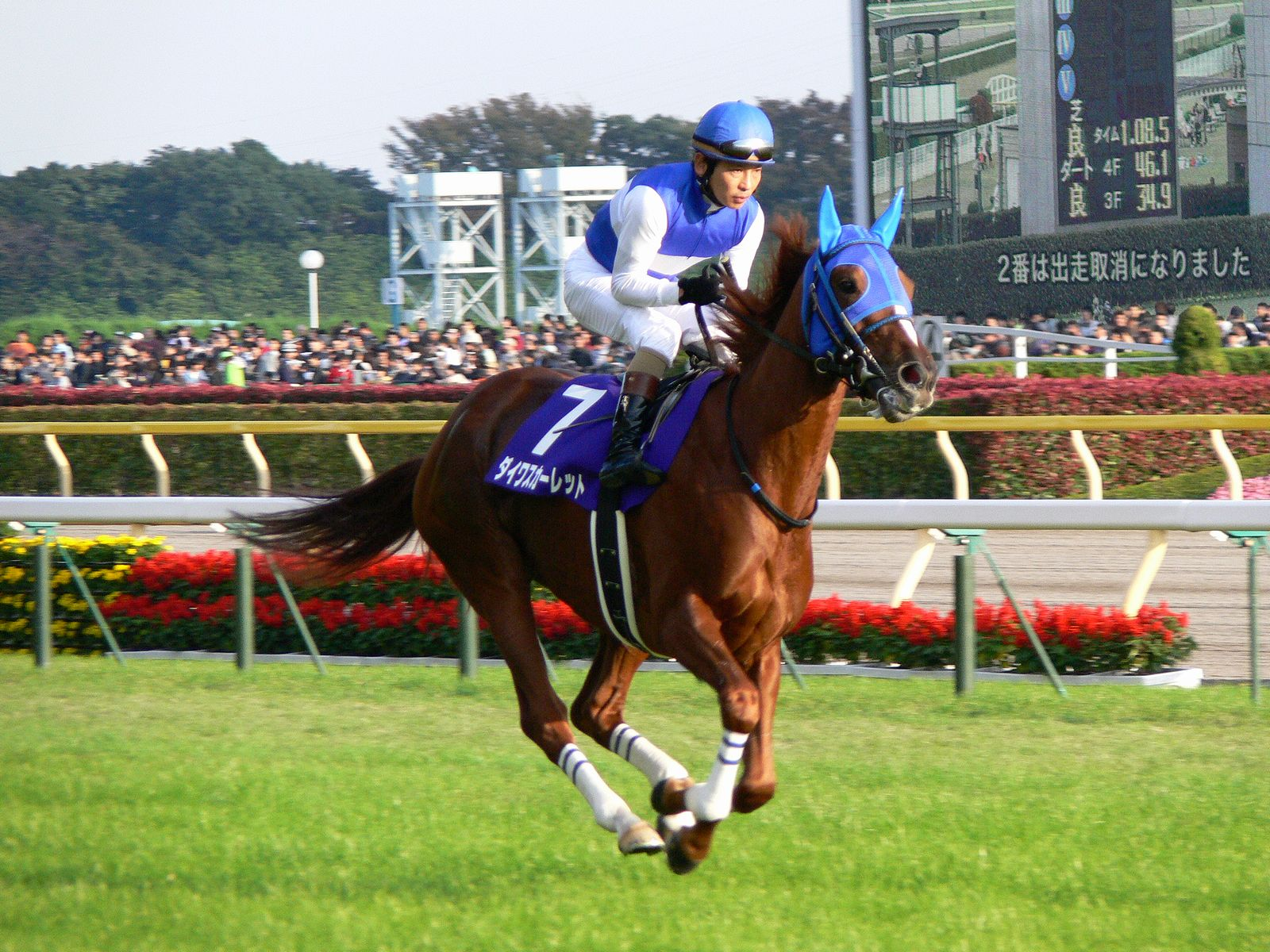
- Daiwa Scarlet at the 2008 Autumn Tennō Shō.
- Breed: Thoroughbred
- Sire: Agnes Tachyon (JPN)
- Grandsire: Sunday Silence (USA)
- Dam: Scarlet Bouquet (JPN)
- Damsire: Northern Taste (CAN)
- Sex: Mare
- Foaled: May 13, 2004 (age 22)
- Country: Japan
- Colour: Chestnut
- Breeder: Shadai Farm
- Owner: Keizo Oshiro
- Racing colours
- Trainer: Kunihide Matsuda
- Jockey: Katsumi Ando
- Record: 12: 8–4–0
- Earnings: ¥786,685,000

Major wins
- Rose Stakes (2007); Queen Elizabeth II Cup (2007); Sankei Osaka Hai (2008); Arima Kinen (2008); Japanese Classic Tiara Race wins: Oka Sho (2007); Shuka Sho (2007)

Awards
- JRA Award for Best Three-Year-Old Filly (2007); JRA Award for Best Horse By Home-bred Sire (2007) (Note: Daiwa Scarlet was the last horse to receive this award, as preferential treatment for "Home-bred Sire" was eliminated starting in 2008 due to the sufficient presence of foreign breeds. From 1971 to 2007, restrictions on foreign-bred horses in Japanese horse racing were implemented to protect the Japanese horse breeding industry from international free-trade.)

Daiwa Scarlet (Japanese: ダイワスカーレット, Hepburn: Daiwa Sukāretto; foaled May 13, 2004) is a retired Japanese Thoroughbred racehorse and broodmare who finished top two in all of her races, winning eight out of twelve of them; four of which were G1 races. Daiwa Scarlet was considered to be part of the "Big Three" of the 2007 Classic Racers along with Aston Machan and Vodka as fellow fillies.

Vodka, a JRA Hall of Fame horse and winner of the Japanese Derby was Scarlet's primary rival who she raced against on six occasions. Although she lost their first head-to-head matchup in the 2007 Tulip Sho, Daiwa Scarlet went on to win the Oka Sho and the Shuka Sho, becoming a Double Tiara champion. Scarlet also finished ahead of Vodka in that year’s Arima Kinen which finished with a large margin in between them. In the 2008 Tenno Sho (Autumn), Scarlet lost by a margin of 2 cm, concluding the competition against Vodka with a total of five G1 races: two victories, one draw and two defeats.

Daiwa Scarlet's career streak of finishing in the top two is the third-highest career place record in Japanese thoroughbred racing, behind Biwa Hayahide before losing the 1994 Autumn Tennō Shō, and Shinzan. Her other victories are the 2007 Queen Elizabeth II Cup where Vodka was scratched, and two G2 races: the 2007 Rose Stakes and the 2008 Sankei Osaka Hai. Scarlet was named the JRA Award for Best Three-Year-Old Filly, and she became the last horse to win the JRA Award for Best Horse by Home-bred Sire in 2007. Her last race was in the 2008 Arima Kinen where she became the first mare to win this race in 37 years, since Tomei in 1971. With her racing results ridden by Katsumi Ando in every race, she was nicknamed "Miss Perfect" due to her performance and her shape.

== Background ==
Daiwa Scarlet was foaled on 13 May 2004 at Shadai Farm. She is a chestnut mare by Agnes Tachyon, winner of the 2001 Satsuki Sho. Her dam, Scarlet Bouquet was a 4 times G3 race winner in 21 starts. She is also the half-sister to 2004 Satsuki Sho winner, Daiwa Major. Daiwa Scarlet was owned by Keizo Oshiro and trained by Kunihide Matsuda.

== Racing career ==
=== 2006: two-year-old season ===
Daiwa Scarlet debuted in November 2006 with her eventual one and only jockey, Katsumi Ando. She won her maiden race easily and ran another race at the end of the year, which was at the Chukyo Nisai Stakes. She also ended up winning that race.

=== 2007: three-year-old season ===
In January 2007, Daiwa Scarlet ran in the Shinzan Kinen, but was passed by Admire Aura, who she had beat in the last race, finishing second. The next race she ran in that year, the Tulip Sho, was the first time she raced against Vodka. Scarlet waited deliberately for Vodka's spurt to spurt with her in order to gauge her opponent. As a result, she ended up getting passed by Vodka and once again came in second place.

Daiwa Scarlet then participated in the next race, which was the Oka Sho. During the race, she got an early start based on the result of the previous race, and held off a chasing Vodka to win the race. This race made her the first racehorse sibling to win a Grade I race alongside her brother, Daiwa Major. Scarlet's next target was at the Oaks, but her now established rival, Vodka, was set to run in the Derby instead of the Oaks. On top of that, Daiwa Scarlet was supposed to be the big favorite for the race. However, she withdrew from the Oaks due to catching a cold. In September 2007, Daiwa Scarlet made her return in the Rose Stakes. She went up front as usual and got away with doing it. A month later, she ran in the Shuka Sho, racing a rematch with Vodka. In the race, she chased second and broke away in the stretch to finish first place, while Vodka came in third place. As a result of the race, Daiwa Scarlet earned the title of double crown mare. The next month she ran in the Queen Elizabeth II Cup. She was voted as the popular horse in the race, and as usual, she took her place at the front and broke away on the straight away. She then held off on the field to win the race.

She was chosen fourth in the year-end Arima Kinen fan vote with about 74,000 votes. The 2007 Arima Kinen was the first time she raced against her brother, Daiwa Major. In the race, Daiwa Scarlet ran her usual run, but although she was on the verge of winning, she ended up in second place behind Matsurida Gogh.

=== 2008: four-year-old season ===
The following year, there were plans for Daiwa Scarlet to run in the dirt Grade I February Stakes in Japan and then try for the Dubai World Cup. However, a woodchip had got her in the eye during training, and she was diagnosed with keratitis. As a result she had to be withdrawn from both races. Her return was swift however, and she raced in the Sankei Osaka Hai. The race included Meisho Samson, who was notable for four Grade I races, and Satsuki Sho winner, Victory. However, Daiwa Scarlet was picked as the favorite, and she lived up to expectations by winning the race.

While training for her next race, Scarlet broke a bone, so she took six months off. She returned in October for the Tenno Sho (Autumn). Her old rival, Vodka, and that year's derby winner, Deep Sky, also participated in the race. The race between these horses attracted a lot of attention. In the race, Daiwa Scarlet took the lead at the front, while Vodka and Deep Sky were chasing her on the straightaway. Vodka crossed Daiwa Scarlet, and Scarlet extended from the inside once again. It was a really close call, and both horses crossed the finish line. No one knew who won until a photo judgement was made, where it showed Vodka was two centimeters ahead of Scarlet. This was said to be Daiwa Scarlet's best race.

At the end of the year, Daiwa Scarlet ran in the Grand Prix Arima Kinen. She got off to a good start, took the lead, and stayed there to keep the rest of the racers at bay. She won the race, marking the first time in 37 years that a mare had won the Arima Kinen.

=== 2009: five-year-old season ===
The following year, the challenge of the Dubai World Cup began again. However, she developed a mild case of flexor tendonitis in training, and this was enough of a reason for her to be retired.

Daiwa Scarlet finished her racing career with a total of 8 wins (including 4 Group 1's) in 12 races with 4 runner-up finishes, a near perfect record. This is the Japanese second-best record in top two finishes for an entire career after Shinzan, who achieved 15 wins and 4 runner-ups in 19 races.

== Breeding career ==
Daiwa Scarlet eventually became a broodmare. Her first foal, Daiwa Reine, was born in 2010. She continued to produce several more offspring in the years that followed until and last child, her only colt Grand Scarlet was born in 2021. It was eventually announced in January 2024 that she would be retired from breeding.

=== Breeding records ===
From fourteen matings, Daiwa Scarlet delivered ten fillies and one colt from seven different sires, while her three pregnancies by two sires resulted unsuccessful; none of her eleven children won a graded race.

c = colt, f = filly

No.	Name	Date of Birth	Sex	Color	Sire	Owner	Trainer	Record	Ref
1st	Daiwa Reine	March 6, 2010	f	Dark bay	Chichicastenango	Keizo Oshiro	Kunihide Matsuda (Ritto)	4 races, 0 wins	
2nd	Daiwa Legend	April 4, 2011	f	Chesnut	King Kamehameha	Keizo Oshiro	Sakae Kunieda (Miho)	22 races, 4 wins Major win: Tomisato Tokubetsu (2015)	
3rd	Daiwa Miranda	March 13, 2012	f	Chesnut	Harbinger	Keizo Oshiro	Sakae Kunieda (Miho)	14 races, 2 wins	
4th	Daiwa With Me	March 7, 2013	f	Chesnut	King Kamehameha	Keizo Oshiro	Kunihide Matsuda (Ritto) → Shin Tachibana (Oi) → Shoichi Kawashima (Funabashi)	21 races, 2 wins	
5th	Daiwa Etoile	February 28, 2014	f	Dark bay	Empire Maker	Keizo Oshiro	Yuichi Shikato (Miho)	11 races, 3 wins	
6th	Daiwa Memory	March 7, 2015	f	Chesnut	Novellist	Keizo Oshiro	Sakae Kunieda (Miho)	16 races, 3 wins Major win: Teletama Hai (2019)	
	Unfertilized				King's Best				
7th	Daiwa Kunnana	February 21, 2017	f	Bay	Novellist	Keizo Oshiro → Teruya Yoshida	Masakazu Ikegami (Miho) → Katsunori Arayama (Kobayashi)	16 races, 3 wins Major win: Isawa Tokubetsu (2021)	
8th	Umbrella Date	February 24, 2018	f	Bay	Eishin Flash	Chizu Yoshida	Katsuhiko Sumii (Ritto) → Hideaki Fujiwara (Ritto)	11 races, 2 wins	
9th	Scarlet Aura	March 14, 2019	f	Bay	Lord Kanaloa	Shadai Race Horse Co., Ltd.	Mitsumasa Nakauchida (Ritto)	3 races, 0 wins	
10th	Scarlet Aria	April 6, 2020	f	Bay	Lord Kanaloa	Shadai Race Horse Co., Ltd.	Shogo Yasuda (Ritto)	2 races, 0 wins	
11th	Grand Scarlet	April 21, 2021	c	Bay	Lord Kanaloa	Shadai Race Horse Co., Ltd.	Ryuji Okubo (Ritto) → Morimoto Nobuharu (Nishiwaki)	6 races, 0 wins	
	Unfertilized				Bricks and Mortar				
	Stillborn				Bricks and Mortar				

== In popular culture ==
An anthropomorphized version of Daiwa Scarlet appears as a character in the Japanese multimedia franchise Umamusume Pretty Derby, voiced by Chisa Kimura. She is depicted as a young woman with auburn twin tails and a tiara, and is an archetypal tsundere and perfectionist who dreams of becoming number one in everything. Despite coming off as bratty and somewhat egotistical, she is highly competitive, strong-willed, and determined to put in as much effort as possible in order to win. She is the roommate and heated rival of Vodka, who she competed against during her classic year, and frequently bicker about any topic imaginable and make competitions out of every activity; despite being rivals, they show great care and concern for one another.

== Racing record ==
Daiwa Scarlet raced in 12 races and won 8 of them whilst finishing second in the other four. This data available is based on JBIS search, netkeiba.com and the JRA.

Date	Age	Racecourse	Race	Grade	Distance (condition)	Field	BK	HN	Odds (Favored)	Finish	Time	Margin	Jockey	Winner (Runner-up)
Nov 19, 2006	2	Kyoto	2YO Newcomer		2,000m (Firm)	12	3	3	1.8 (1st)	1st	2:04.1	–0.3 (1 3/4 lengths)	Katsumi Ando	(Cosmo Gromit)
Dec 16, 2006	2	Chukyo	Sports Hochi Hai Chukyo	OP	1,800m (Firm)	8	1	1	2.2 (1st)	1st	1:47.8	–0.1 (1/2 length)	Katsumi Ando	(Admire Aura)
Jan 8, 2007	3	Kyoto	Nikkan Sports Shinzan Kinen	3	1,600m (Firm)	10	7	8	1.9 (1st)	2nd	1:35.3	0.2 (1 1/2 lengths)	Katsumi Ando	Admire Aura
Mar 3, 2007	3	Hanshin	Tulip Sho	3	1,600m (Firm)	16	4	7	2.8 (2nd)	2nd	1:33.7	0.0 (Neck)	Katsumi Ando	Vodka
Apr 8, 2007	3	Hanshin	Oka Sho	1	1,600m (Firm)	18	8	18	5.9 (3rd)	1st	1:33.7	–0.2 (1 1/2 lengths)	Katsumi Ando	(Vodka)
Sep 16, 2007	3	Hanshin	Rose Stakes	2	1,800m (Firm)	14	4	5	1.6 (1st)	1st	1:46.1	–0.1 (1 1/2 lengths)	Katsumi Ando	(Bella Rheia)
Oct 14, 2007	3	Kyoto	Shūka Shō	1	2,000m (Firm)	18	7	13	2.8 (2nd)	1st	1:59.1	–0.2 (1 1/4 lengths)	Katsumi Ando	(Rain Dance)
Nov 11, 2007	3	Kyoto	Queen Elizabeth II Cup	1	2,200m (Firm)	13	5	7	1.9 (1st)	1st	2:11.9	–0.1 (3/4 lengths)	Katsumi Ando	(Fusaichi Pandora)
Dec 23, 2007	3	Nakayama	Arima Kinen	1	2,500m (Good)	15	4	7	8.1 (5th)	2nd	2:33.8	0.2 (1 1/4 lengths)	Katsumi Ando	Matsurida Gogh
Apr 6, 2008	4	Hanshin	Sankei Osaka Hai	2	2,000m (Firm)	11	7	9	2.0 (1st)	1st	1:58.7	–0.1 (3/4 lengths)	Katsumi Ando	(Eishin Deputy)
Nov 2, 2008	4	Tokyo	Tenno Sho (Autumn)	1	2,000m (Firm)	17	4	7	3.6 (2nd)	2nd	1:57.2	0.0 (Nose)	Katsumi Ando	Vodka
Dec 28, 2008	4	Nakayama	Arima Kinen	1	2,500m (Firm)	14	8	13	2.6 (1st)	1st	2:31.5	–0.3 (1 3/4 lengths)	Katsumi Ando	(Admire Monarch)

Legend:
Turf Dirt

== Pedigree ==
Pedigree of Daiwa Scarlet (JPN), chestnut mare, 2004
Sire Agnes Tachyon (JPN) 1998	Sunday Silence (USA); 1986	Halo	Hail to Reason
Sire Agnes Tachyon (JPN) 1998	Sunday Silence (USA); 1986	Halo	Cosmah
Sire Agnes Tachyon (JPN) 1998	Sunday Silence (USA); 1986	Wishing Well	Understanding
Sire Agnes Tachyon (JPN) 1998	Sunday Silence (USA); 1986	Wishing Well	Mountain Flower
Sire Agnes Tachyon (JPN) 1998	Agnes Flora (JPN); 1987	Royal Ski	Raja Baba
Sire Agnes Tachyon (JPN) 1998	Agnes Flora (JPN); 1987	Royal Ski	Coz o'Nijinsky
Sire Agnes Tachyon (JPN) 1998	Agnes Flora (JPN); 1987	Agnes Lady	Remand
Sire Agnes Tachyon (JPN) 1998	Agnes Flora (JPN); 1987	Agnes Lady	Ikoma Eikan
Dam Scarlet Bouquet (JPN) 1988	Northern Taste (CAN); 1971	Northern Dancer	Nearctic
Dam Scarlet Bouquet (JPN) 1988	Northern Taste (CAN); 1971	Northern Dancer	Natalma
Dam Scarlet Bouquet (JPN) 1988	Northern Taste (CAN); 1971	Lady Victoria	Victoria Park
Dam Scarlet Bouquet (JPN) 1988	Northern Taste (CAN); 1971	Lady Victoria	Lady Angela
Dam Scarlet Bouquet (JPN) 1988	Scarlet Ink (USA); 1971	Crimson Satan	Spy Song
Dam Scarlet Bouquet (JPN) 1988	Scarlet Ink (USA); 1971	Crimson Satan	Papila
Dam Scarlet Bouquet (JPN) 1988	Scarlet Ink (USA); 1971	Consentida	Beau Max
Dam Scarlet Bouquet (JPN) 1988	Scarlet Ink (USA); 1971	Consentida	La Menina (Family 4-d)
