= Liberty Island (horse) =

Japanese-bred Thoroughbred racehorse (2020–2025)

Liberty Island リバティアイランド
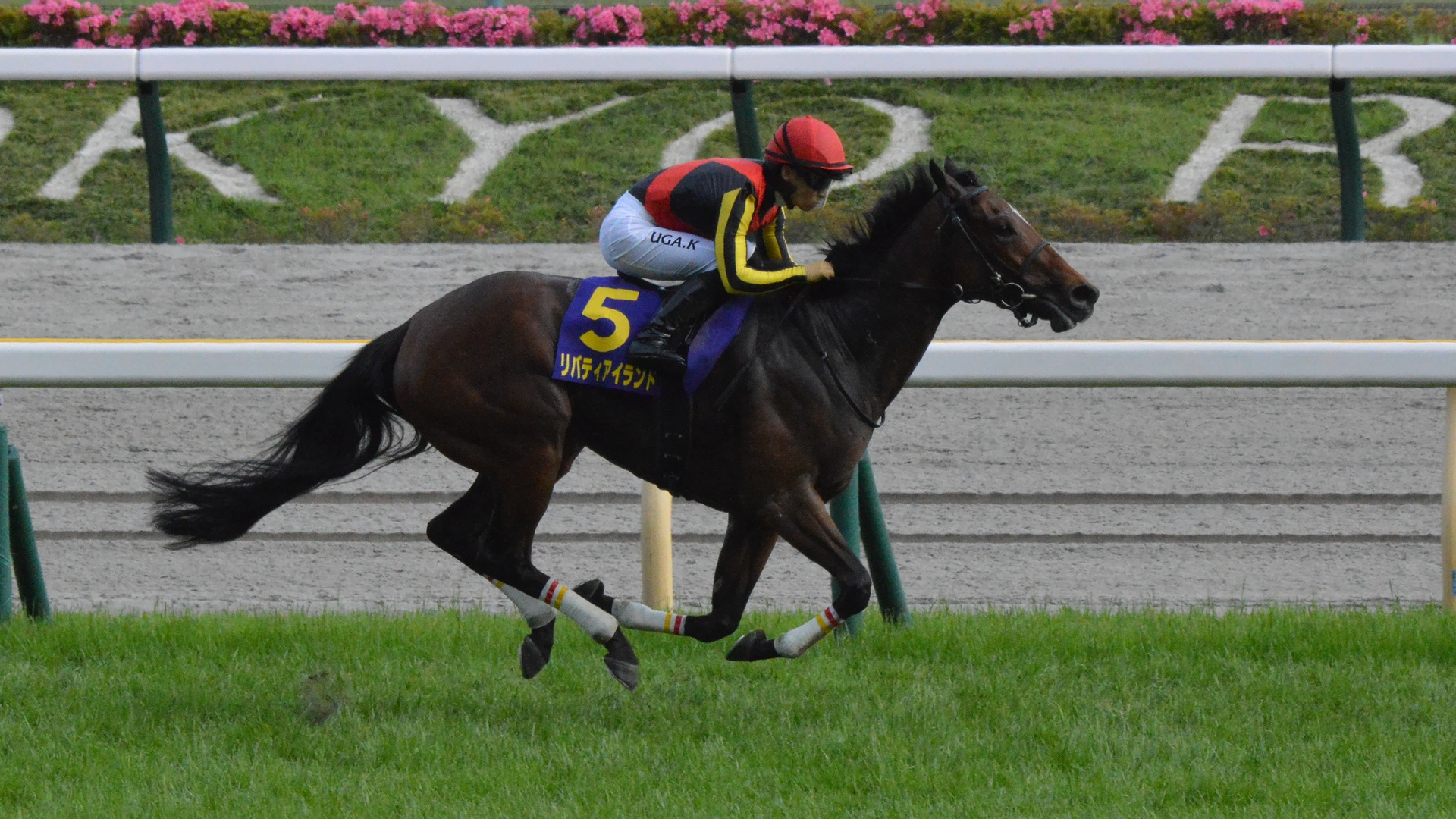
- Liberty Island at the 2023 Yushun Himba
- Breed: Thoroughbred
- Sire: Duramente
- Grandsire: King Kamehameha
- Dam: Yankee Rose
- Damsire: All American
- Sex: Filly
- Foaled: February 2, 2020
- Died: April 27, 2025 (aged 5)
- Country: Japan
- Colour: Bay
- Breeder: Northern Farm
- Owner: Sunday Racing
- Racing colours
- Trainer: Mitsumasa Nakauchida
- Jockey: Yuga Kawada
- Record: 12: 5-3-1
- Earnings: 989,199,200 JPY (Note: Earnings earned overseas are converted to JPY using the formula provided by JRA. 2024, 2025.); JPN: 744,440,000 JPY; UAE: 600,000 USD; HK: 8,400,000 HKD; UAE: 50,000 USD

Major wins
- Hanshin Juvenile Fillies (2022); Japanese Classic Tiara Race wins: Oka Sho (2023); Yushun Himba (2023); Shuka Sho (2023)

Awards
- 7th Japanese Triple Tiara Champion (2023); JRA Award for Best Two-Year-Old Filly (2022); JRA Award for Best Three-Year-Old Filly (2023)

Liberty Island (Japanese: リバティアイランド, Hepburn: Ribati Airando; February 2, 2020 – April 27, 2025) was a Japanese Thoroughbred racehorse who became the seventh filly to win the Japanese Triple Tiara in 2023. Her name is derived from the island of the same name in New York Harbor, where the Statue of Liberty is installed, as her dam was named "Yankee Rose".

Her major victories include the 2022 Hanshin Juvenile Fillies, the 2023 Oka Sho, Yushun Himba, and Shuka Sho. She was awarded the JRA Award for Best Two-Year-Old Filly for 2022 and the JRA Award for Best Three-Year-Old Filly for 2023.

Liberty Island died on April 27, 2025, at the age of 5. She was euthanized after sustaining a life-threatening injury while racing in the Queen Elizabeth II Cup at Sha Tin Racecourse.

== Racing career ==
=== 2022: two-year-old season ===
She made her debut at a 2-year-old debut race at Niigata Racecourse on July 30, 2022, at a distance of 1,600 meters. With Yuga Kawada as her jockey, she was favored at 2/1. She moved up from 7th place to beat Cruzeiro do Sul by 0.5 seconds, or three lengths. She ran the last three furlongs in 31.4 seconds (≒68.8 km/h). This was the same record pace that Ruggero set in May of that year in the Idaten Stakes, setting a tied record. After the race, Kawada commented, "Things went just like during training. She is a horse that I look forward to growing up."

It was briefly reported that she would race in the Niigata Nisai Stakes due to be held on August 28, but instead headed to the GIII Artemis Stakes. Starting from post position #3, she was favored with odds of 1.4. During the race, she ran among the pack and tried to go to the outside but was blocked and was unable to escape. At the end, she tried to catch up to Ravel on the outside but lost by a neck.

External videos
- 2022 阪神ジュベナイルフィリーズ レース映像 jraofficial（JRA公式YouTubeチャンネル）による動画

She was sent to the GI Hanshin Juvenile Fillies held on December 11 for her 3rd race, where she faced off Artemis Stakes winner Ravel and Cosmos Sho winner Moryana as well as Sapporo Nisai Stakes winner Dura and Doe Eyes, who was in second place of that same race. She was again the favorite, with odds of 2.6. Liberty Island was at 9th place and ran the first 800 meters at a pace of 45.2 seconds before advancing from the outside at the final stretch, passing the other horses at a pace of 35.5seconds for the last three furlongs, winning her first Grade I race with a 2-and-a-half length lead against second place Shinryokuka. This was the first time Kawada won the race, and this victory made him the third jockey to win all three of the GI races for two-year olds (the other two being the Asahi Hai Futurity Stakes and the Hopeful Stakes). After the race, Kawada commented, "I felt that she was not going to lose" and "between the paddock and the back of the gate, she focused even more, and she was looking even better. She showed such a great race that I really don't have much to say about it."

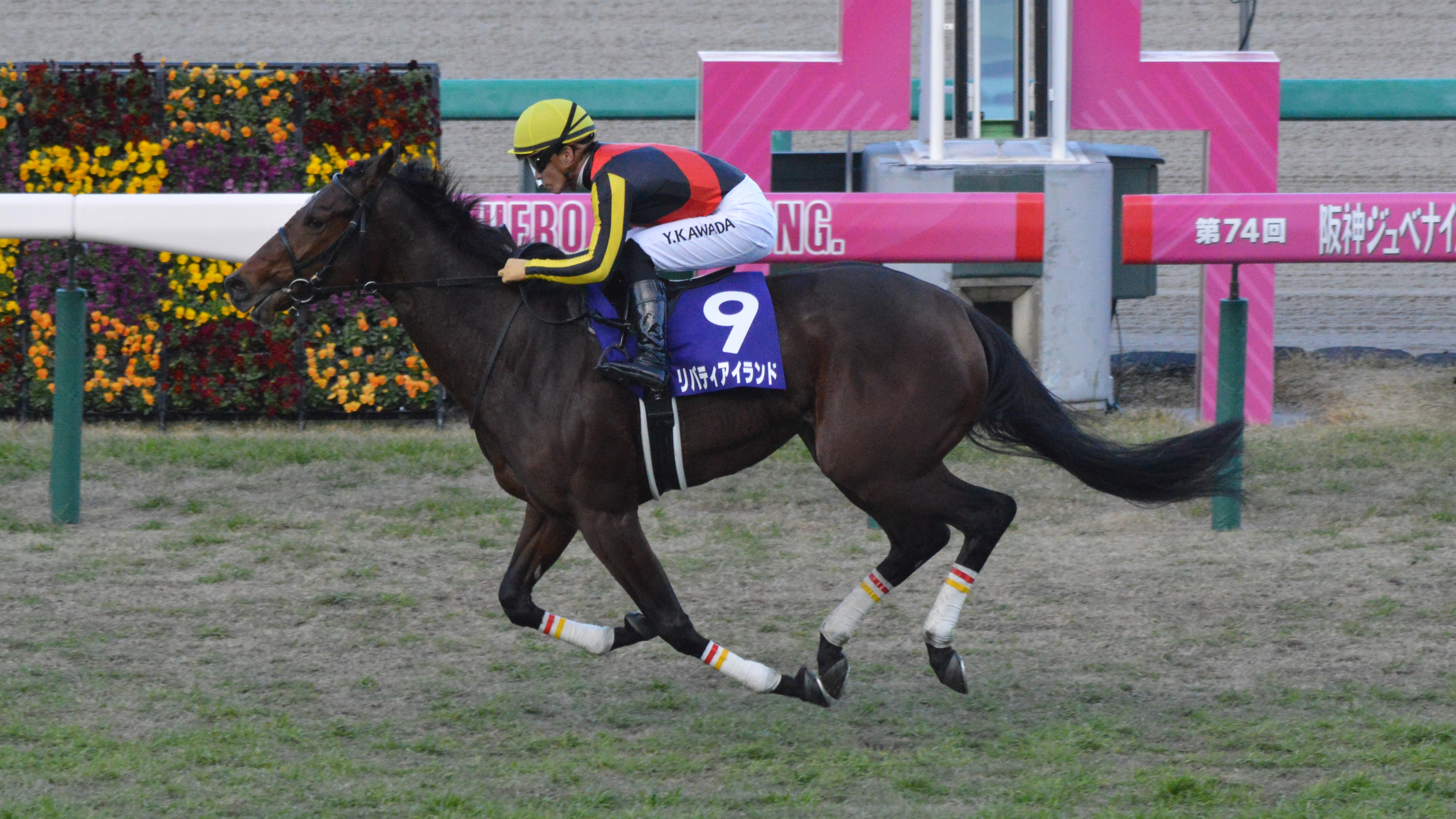
2022 Hanshin JF

=== 2023: three-year-old season ===
On January 10, the JRA Award was announced, and Liberty Island was voted Best Two-Year-Old Filly with all 288 votes voting for her. On January 20, her owner, Sunday Racing, announced on their website that she would head straight to the Oka Sho, the first leg of the Japanese Triple Tiara that would be held on April 9 as her first race of the season.

External videos
- 2023 Oka Sho race footage uploaded on JRA's official YouTube channel

As previously announced, Liberty Island was entered into the Oka Sho. She was once again the most favored at odds of 1.6 despite the four months long break, as well as facing off other contenders such as Tulip Sho winner Mozu Meimei, Fillies' Revue winner Sing That Song, Kona Coast, Perifania, and Harper. The horse had a minor setback at the gate, forcing her to race at the rear of the pack, with her still being at around the 16th place at the 4th corner. However, after going to the outside, she ran at a pace of 32.9 seconds for the last 3 furlongs, catching Kona Coast and Perifania and winning the race. Kawada became the 6th jockey to win the race two years in a row, as he had won the last Oka Sho with Stars On Earth. This victory was also the first classic victory for Liberty Island's trainer, Mitsumasa Nakauchida.

External videos
- 2023 Oka Sho jockey camera footage uploaded on JRA's official YouTube channel

The JRA had implemented jockey cameras in the spring of that year. At the Oka Sho, a camera was mounted on Kawada's helmet, and the filmed video was uploaded to YouTube on their official channel. The video, which contained moments of Kawada talking to his horse gently, went viral, being viewed over 200,000 times in the first 3 hours and becoming a trending topic on Twitter.

External videos
- 2023 Yushun Himba race footage uploaded on JRA's official YouTube channel

External videos
- 2023 Yushun Himba jockey camera footage uploaded on JRA's official YouTube channel

The horse was briefly sent to pasture before returning to the stable on April 29 in preparation for her next race, the Yushun Himba. The horse was entered into the race as planned with odds of 1.4, making her by far the most favored. She entered the starting gate calmly and made a good start. Rather than racing from the back of the pack like her previous race, she raced from the front. She placed herself around 6th place at around the 1000-meter mark, which was covered in exactly one minute. As the horse entered the final corner, she started to push forward. After passing Ravel at around the 200-meter mark, she lengthened her lead further, passing the finishing line with a six lengths lead against Harper and Dura. This lead was the largest gap at the Yushun Himba since 1984, when races were first graded, surpassing the five lengths lead that Gentildonna set in 2012.

Her 3rd GI victory marked the 2nd year in a row that two of the Triple Tiara races were won by the same horse, and the 17th ever in history. She also became the 13th horse for a horse named Best Two-Year-Old Filly to win the Yushun Himba. For Kawada, this was the second time he won the race since Gentildonna. This also became the first GI race Nakauchida won where the race was held at a distance of over 2,000 meters. After the race, Kawada told reporters that "he was able to race at a good rhythm" and that he "was glad that the horse became a Double Crown horse, and also proud that he was able to show the horse being strong."

On May 25, the JRA announced the rating for the Yushun Himba. Liberty Island earned 120 pounds, which made her the highest-rated in Yushun Himba history, with other Yushun Himba winners such as Gentildonna, Soul Stirring, Almond Eye, and Stars on Earth only earning 115. The following day, Liberty Island was sent to pasture at Northern Farm Shigaraki. It was also announced that the horse, rather than being sent to a trial race, would instead be going straight to the Shuka Sho in fall, with the intention of making her the first Triple Tiara winner since Daring Tact in 2020.

On October 15, she was entered into the Shuka Sho as previously announced, with the odds at 1.1, making her by far the most favored to win. After making a good start, she placed herself in the middle of the pack. At around the 3rd corner, she moved to the outside of the pack and started to make her move, and after taking the lead at the 4th corner, she crossed the finish line without letting any other horse contest the lead, making her the 7th horse ever to win the Japanese Triple Tiara, and the first since Daring Tact in 2020.

It was later announced that her next race would be the Japan Cup. It was also announced that as a second option, the horse was also pre-registered for the Hong Kong Cup.

At the Japan Cup, she was the second most favored to win behind Equinox. After making a good start, she placed herself around 4th or 5th place behind the front, while keeping a similar pace behind Equinox. After entering the final stretch, she pushed herself up and came up to 2nd at around the 150-meter mark, but was unable to catch up to Equinox, who had won against her by 4 lengths. This marked her first defeat since the Artemis Stakes, and the first defeat at a Grade 1 race. After the race, Kawada commented, "we gave all that we could and she made an excellent performance, but the best horse in the world was indeed the best, and was very strong. I do think it was a good experience for Liberty Island, and would be a good learning point going forward." Liberty Island's trainer, Nakauchida, also commented "I have no regrets entering this horse in this race. There's nothing pessimistic about her race. She raced well according to how the race went. I believe perhaps Liberty gave it her best shot for the first time." After the race, Shunsuke Yoshida of Sunday Racing, the owner of Liberty Island, stated that she would not be entered in to the Arima Kinen and spend the rest of the year off the races.

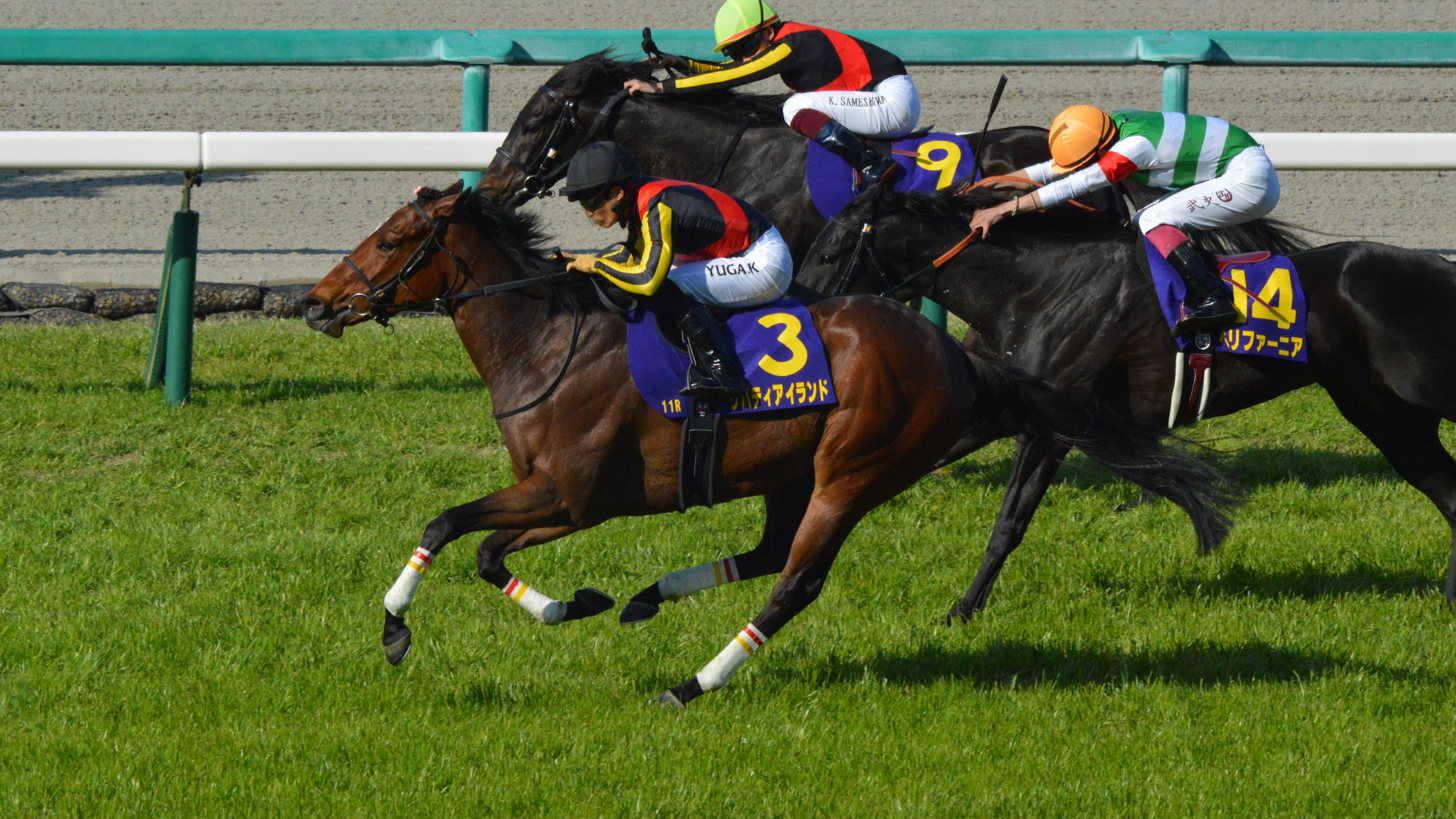
2023 Oka Sho

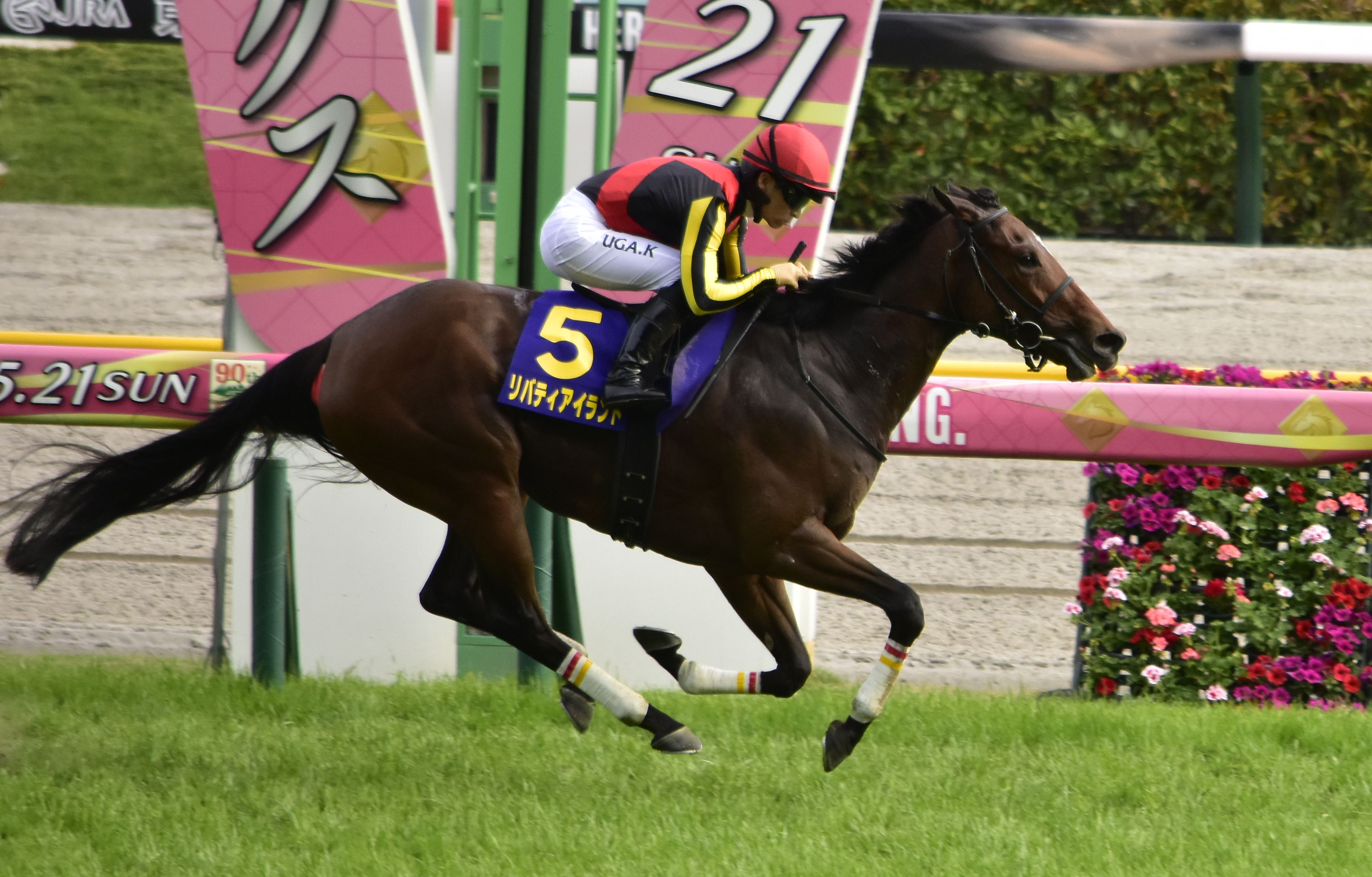
2023 Yushun Himba (Oaks)

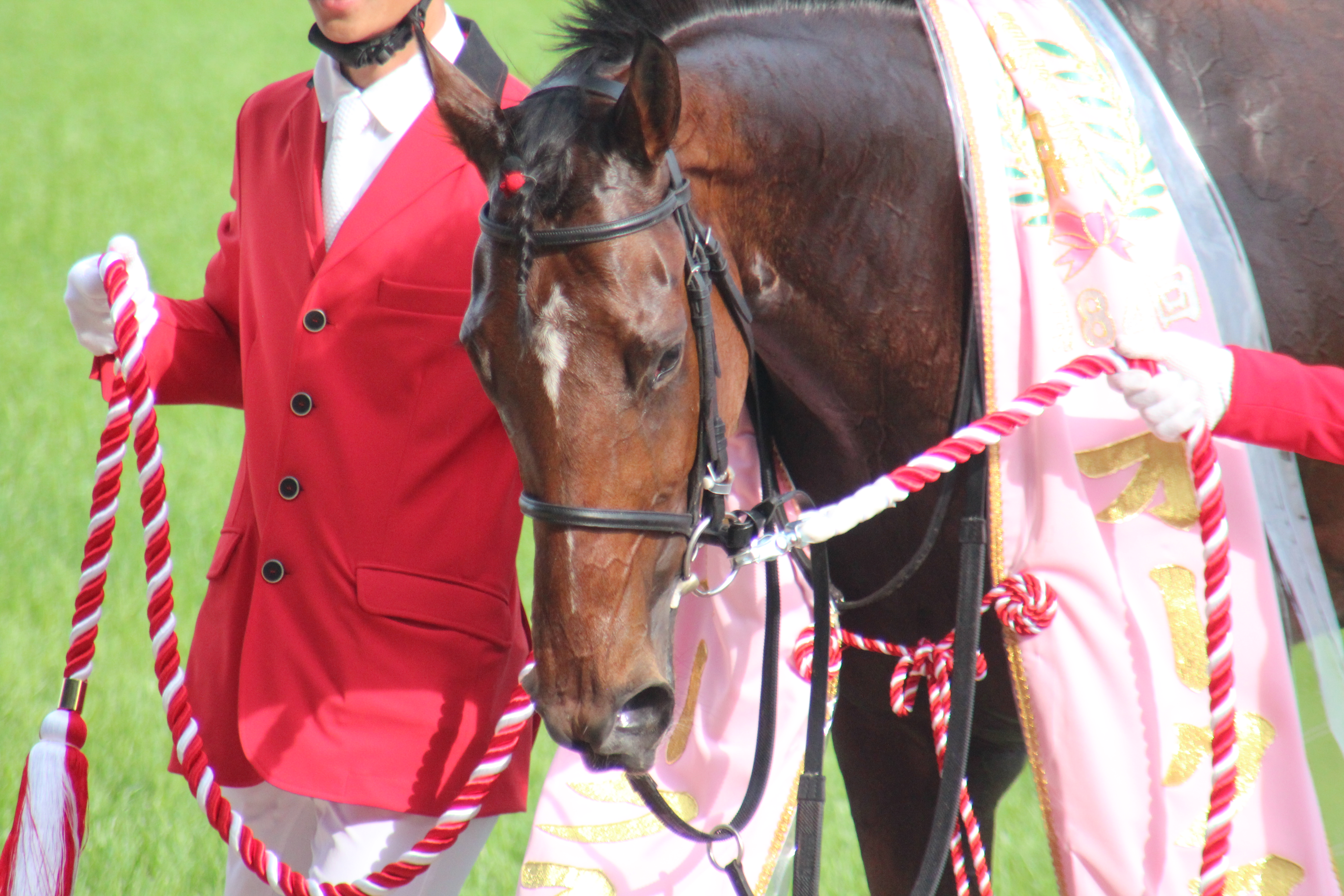
2023 Yushun Himba (Oaks) Ceremony

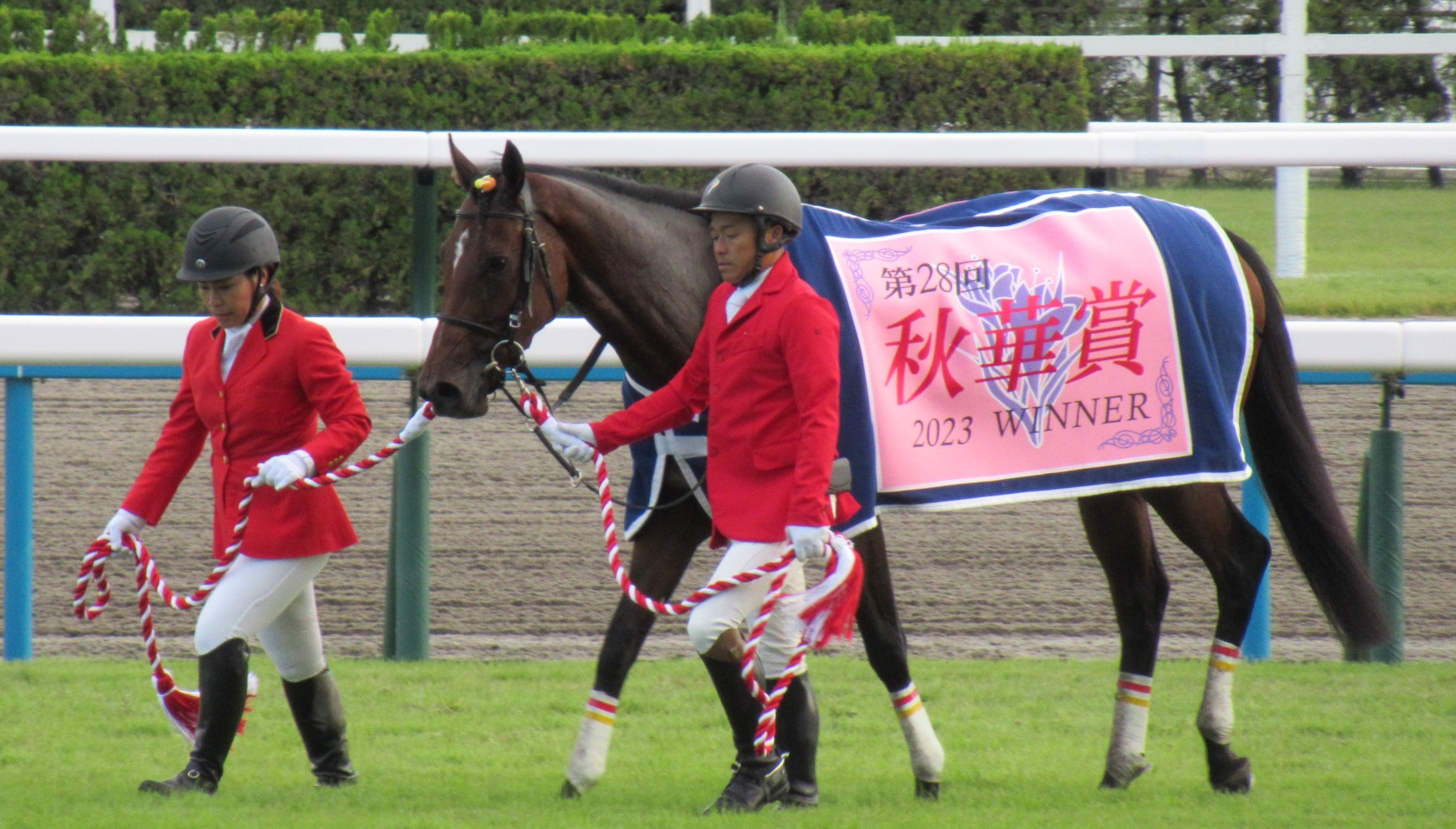
2023 Shuka Sho

=== 2024: four-year-old season ===
In this new season, Liberty Island ran her first race in the Dubai Sheema Classic, held at Meydan, Dubai. Nakauchida announced the entry on 14 January, and Kawada remained her jockey for her foreign expedition. She launched from gate 9 and positioned herself in the middle pack. She made her bid once the race entered the final straight, but she could not keep the speed on the inside and lost the battle in the final furlong against Rebel's Romance and her compatriot and teammate, Shahryar, to finish in third, three lengths behind. Post race, Nakauchida stated that the horse was in good condition prior to the race but she was less sharp that and could not unleash her usual closing speed. Two months after the race, she suffered a mild inflammation in her suspensory ligament, forcing her to take a complete break this spring to prepare for the fall.

She rested to recuperate, returned to Ritto Training Center in September, and prepared for her comeback in the Tenno Sho (Autumn) later in October. On the days leading up to the race, she showed no signs of decline despite finishing outside the top two for the first time in her latest race. As soon as the race began, she broke smoothly from the outer stall. She ran mostly in fourth position and entered the striking lane excellently, but she was gassed on the final 200 metres as she teetered off in the final stint to finish 13th. Kawada noted that this was the first time that Liberty Island lost the momentum in the end of the race despite having a good warm-up and early phase. To close out the season, she had two choices, which were the Japan Cup or the Hong Kong Cup. Nakauchida decided to pick the latter one because it gave more time for the horse to recover, as the Japan Cup was too soon after her latest race. Arriving in Hong Kong, Kawada stated that the horse was able to handle the quarantine phase and stay in good shape during the final workout. On the race day, she ran on the middle for most of the part but able to challenge the front with her final kick, surpassed her compatriot, Tastiera and finished in second place behind Romantic Warrior. Kawada spoke after the race, "She was in very good condition and ready for the race. I planned the race mainly to let her run comfortably, keeping in mind the strong winner, and the plan was to catch her from a little distance away. However, I couldn't get her to run alongside me, but she is one of Hong Kong's great champions after all, so I am grateful that I was able to give it my all."

=== 2025: five-year-old season ===
Nakauchida put her in an international race once more as her first race of the season. This time, she would participate in the Dubai Turf instead. In the race, she tracked the field in the middle as usual, but she could not find her trademark final closing speed and finished a distant eighth. Speaking about the race, Nakauchida said the horse was in good condition, had an excellent warm-up, running in a good rhythm, but sadly failed to execute the finishing kick she was known for. Right after this race, Nakauchida decided to send her out once more. This time was to Hong Kong in the Queen Elizabeth II Cup on 27 April.

==== Death in Hong Kong and her memorial ====
Before the race, her team was positive about her development and training, as they thought her speed was improving in the workout. This time around, she started from an outside stall - gate 11. In the race, she trailed at the back and gradually moved up as she approached the straight, but her gait became erratic, and she suddenly slowed down, causing Kawada to dismount and her race to be stopped. She was instantly treated and diagnosed on the spot. According to the final report by her owner, Sunday Racing, they found that Liberty Island had ruptured the medial and lateral sesamoid ligaments of her left foreleg, and her fetlock joint was subluxated, causing it to touch the ground. Due to this poor prognosis, she was immediately euthanized.

Her jockey, Kawada, spoke after the incident on his Instagram:

"I cannot express my feelings in words. I am so sorry that she met the worst possible end. I am so sorry that we took Liberty away from everyone. She tried her best until the very end. She endured without falling and protected me until the end. Even after she stopped, she behaved bravely and calmly. She was an incredibly strong and intelligent horse. I am truly grateful to the Hong Kong Jockey Club. I rode her in all 12 races. "So many memories come to mind, but it was all because she was there. I am nothing but grateful. And I am so sorry that this happened. Thank you so much to everyone who supported her."

From 3rd until 25th of May, memorial stands and condolence books were set up at racecourses and off-track betting facilities throughout the country on days when the JRA courses were racing. Due to the quarantine regulations, the remains were supposed to be buried locally but after negotiations between Sunday Racing representative, Shunsuke Yoshida and the Hong Kong Jockey Club, it was decided that the remains would be cremated, given a memorial services before being returned to Japan as ashes. Both Shunsuke Yoshida and Katsumi Yoshida decided to build a tombstone so that fans can visit and gave respect to her grave. On 6 August, the tombstone was built in the Northern Horse Park at Abira, Hokkaido, which was officially opened to the public two days later.

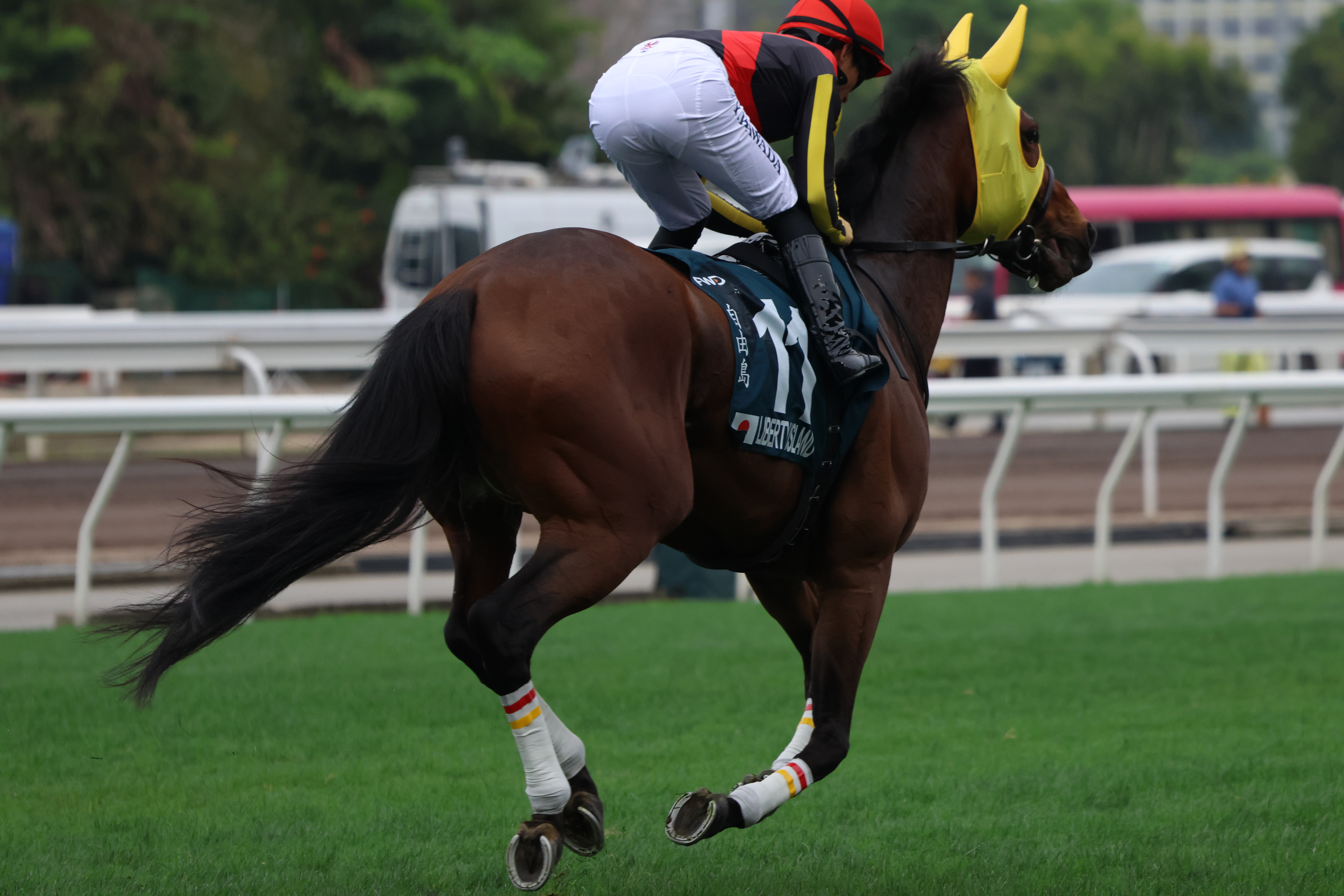
Liberty Island before the 2025 Queen Elizabeth II Cup

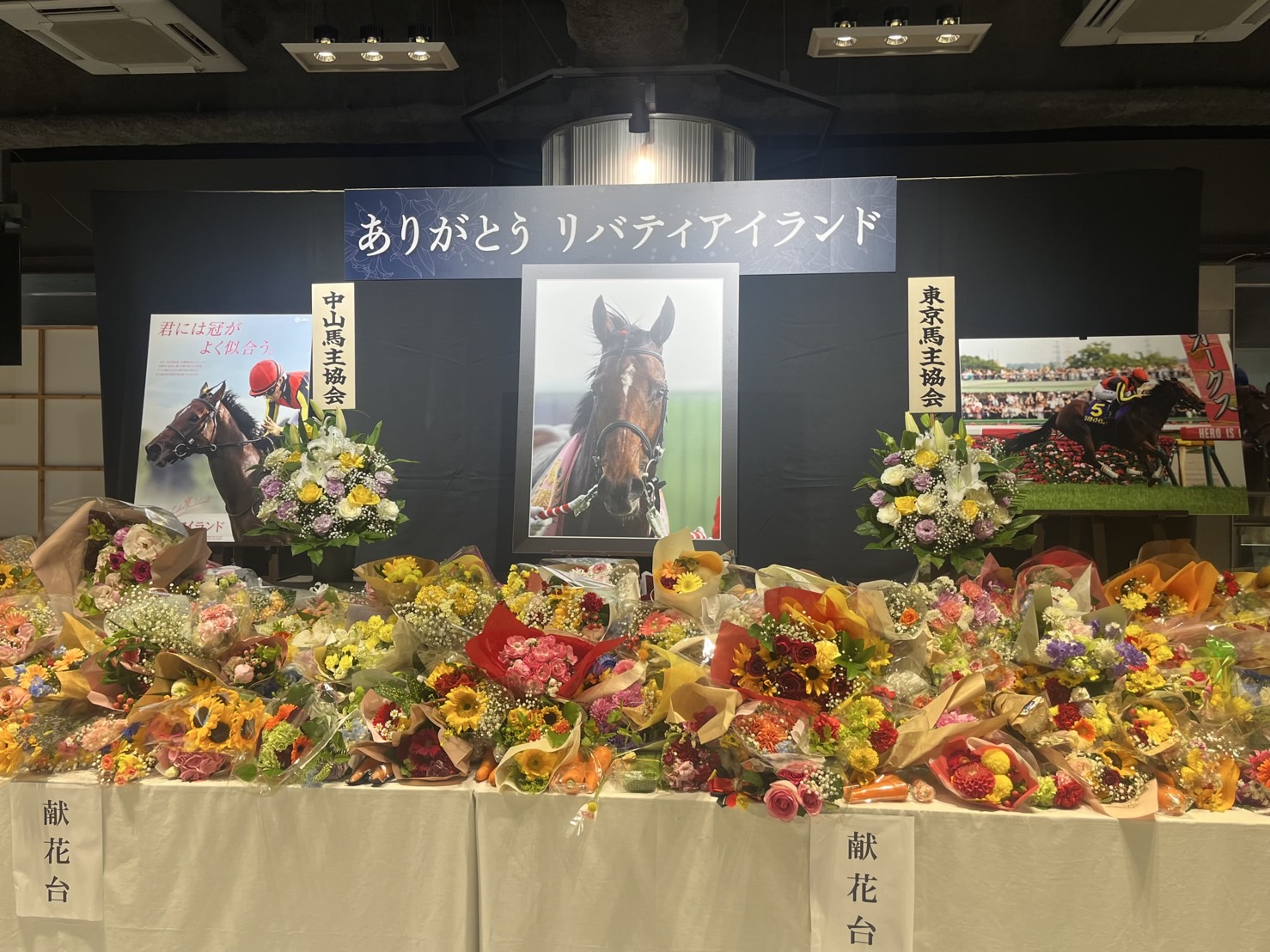
Memorial Altar of Liberty Island in Tokyo Racecourse

== Racing statistics ==
The below data is based on information available on JBIS Search, netkeiba.com, Emirates Racing Authority and Hong Kong Jockey Club.

Date	Track	Race	Grade	Distance Condition	Entry	HN	Odds (Favored)	Finish	Time	Margins	Jockey	Winner (Runner-up)
2022 – two-year-old season
Jul 30	Niigata	2YO Newcomer		1600 m (Firm)	12	2	2.1 (1)	1st	1:35.8	–0.5	Yuga Kawada	(Cruzeiro do Sul)
Oct 29	Tokyo	Artemis Stakes	3	1600 m (Firm)	10	3	1.4 (1)	2nd	1:33.9	0.1	Yuga Kawada	Ravel
Dec 11	Hanshin	Hanshin JF	1	1600 m (Firm)	18	9	2.6 (1)	1st	1:33.1	–0.4	Yuga Kawada	(Shinryokuka)
2023 – three-year-old season
Apr 9	Hanshin	Oka Sho	1	1600 m (Firm)	18	3	1.6 (1)	1st	1:32.1	–0.2	Yuga Kawada	(Kona Coast)
May 21	Tokyo	Yushun Himba	1	2400 m (Firm)	18	5	1.4 (1)	1st	2:23.1	–1.0	Yuga Kawada	(Harper)
Oct 15	Kyoto	Shūka Sho	1	2000 m (Good)	18	6	1.1 (1)	1st	2:01.1	–0.1	Yuga Kawada	(Masked Diva)
Nov 26	Tokyo	Japan Cup	1	2400 m (Firm)	18	1	3.7 (2)	2nd	2:22.5	0.7	Yuga Kawada	Equinox
2024 – four-year-old season
Mar 30	Meydan	Dubai Sheema Classic	1	2410 m (Firm)	12	12	2.8 (1)	3rd	2:27.16	0.4	Yuga Kawada	Rebel's Romance
Oct 27	Tokyo	Tenno Sho (Autumn)	1	2000 m (Firm)	15	12	2.3 (1)	13th	1:58.1	0.8	Yuga Kawada	Do Deuce
Dec 8	Sha Tin	Hong Kong Cup	1	2000 m (Good)	11	9	9.3 (2)	2nd	2:00.74	0.23	Yuga Kawada	Romantic Warrior
2025 – five-year-old season
Apr 5	Meydan	Dubai Turf	1	1800 m (Good)	11	5	8.5 (2)	8th	1:46.42	1.42	Yuga Kawada	Soul Rush
Apr 27	Sha Tin	QE II Cup	1	2000 m (Good)	11	11	6.0 (3)	DNF	--	--	Yuga Kawada	Tastiera

== Pedigree ==
Pedigree of Liberty Island
Sire Duramente 2012 b.	King Kamehameha; 2001 b.	Kingmambo	Mr. Prospector
Sire Duramente 2012 b.	King Kamehameha; 2001 b.	Kingmambo	Miesque
Sire Duramente 2012 b.	King Kamehameha; 2001 b.	Manfath	Last Tycoon
Sire Duramente 2012 b.	King Kamehameha; 2001 b.	Manfath	Pilot Bird
Sire Duramente 2012 b.	Admire Groove; 2000 b.	Sunday Silence	Halo
Sire Duramente 2012 b.	Admire Groove; 2000 b.	Sunday Silence	Wishing Well
Sire Duramente 2012 b.	Admire Groove; 2000 b.	Air Groove	Tony Bin
Sire Duramente 2012 b.	Admire Groove; 2000 b.	Air Groove	Dyna Carle
Dam Yankee Rose 2013 br.	All American; 2005 dk.b.	Red Ransom	Roberto
Dam Yankee Rose 2013 br.	All American; 2005 dk.b.	Red Ransom	Arabia
Dam Yankee Rose 2013 br.	All American; 2005 dk.b.	Milva	Strawberry Road
Dam Yankee Rose 2013 br.	All American; 2005 dk.b.	Milva	Tersa
Dam Yankee Rose 2013 br.	Condesaar; 2004 b.	Xaar	Zafonic
Dam Yankee Rose 2013 br.	Condesaar; 2004 b.	Xaar	Monroe
Dam Yankee Rose 2013 br.	Condesaar; 2004 b.	Condescendance	El Gran Senor
Dam Yankee Rose 2013 br.	Condesaar; 2004 b.	Condescendance	Condessa

- Liberty Island's dam, Yankee Rose, is an Australian racehorse who won the Spring Champion Stakes and the Sires' Produce Stakes.
- Liberty Island's great-granddam's half-brother is Biko Pegasus, who won the Keisei Stakes and Centaur Stakes. Their half-sister, Valira, is the granddam of CBC Sho winner Symboli Gran.
- Liberty Island's ancestors, Try My Best and El Gran Senor, are full brothers (sire: Northern Dancer, dam: Sex Appeal), making them technically an inbreeding of 5x4. She also has an inbreeding of Mr. Prospector by 4x5 and Hail To Reason by 5x5.
