= Shadai Kagura =

Japanese Thoroughbred racehorse (1986–2005)

Shadai Kagura シャダイカグラ
- Shadai Kagura at the paddock for the 1989 Queen Elizabeth II Cup.
- Breed: Thoroughbred
- Sire: Real Shadai
- Grandsire: Roberto
- Dam: Milly Bird
- Damsire: Faberge
- Sex: Mare
- Foaled: 23 March 1986
- Died: 4 April 2005 (aged 19); Biratori, Hokkaido, Japan
- Country: Japan
- Colour: Chestnut
- Breeder: Nojima Bokujo
- Owner: Shigeru Yoneda
- Racing colours
- Trainer: Yuji Ito
- Jockey: Yutaka Take
- Record: 11: 7-2-0
- Earnings: ¥232,369,000

Major wins
- Pegasus Stakes(1989); Rose Stakes (1989); Japanese Classic Tiara Race wins: Oka Shō (1989)

Awards
- Best 4-Year-Old Filly (1989)

Shadai Kagura (Japanese: シャダイカグラ, Hepburn: Shadai Kagura; 23 March 1986 – 4 April 2005) was a Japanese Thoroughbred racehorse and broodmare. She competed from 1988 to 1989, recording seven wins in eleven starts, including the Oka Shō (GI) in 1989. She also won the Rose Stakes (GII) and Pegasus Stakes (GIII) in 1989. She was named Best 4-Year-Old Filly in 1989. Her career ended when she suffered a suspensory ligament rupture during the Queen Elizabeth II Cup (GI), finishing last in her retirement race.

== Background ==
Shadai Kagura was a chestnut mare bred in Monbetsu, Hokkaido, by Nojima Bokujo. She was sired by Real Shadai, an American-bred son of Roberto who had raced in France before being imported to Japan as a stallion, and her dam was Milly Bird, a daughter of the French-bred stallion Faberge. Her racing name combines the "Shadai" prefix of her sire with the "Kagura" prefix used by owner Shigeru Yoneda. She was owned by Shigeru Yoneda and sent into training with Yuji Ito at the JRA's Ritto Training Center.

== Racing career ==
=== 1988: two-year-old season (three-year-old by Japanese reckoning) ===
Shadai Kagura debuted on June 19, 1988, in a maiden race on the dirt at Sapporo Racecourse, ridden by Masato Shibata, finishing second. She won a maiden race at Sapporo on July 3. After a break due to periostitis, she returned in October, winning the Rindo Sho (Allowance) at Kyoto Racecourse with Yutaka Take aboard, and the Kyoto 3-Year-Old Stakes (Open) at Kyoto in November. She finished second in the Radio Tampa Hai 3-Year-Old Filly Stakes (GIII) at Hanshin Racecourse in December.

=== 1989: three-year-old season ===
Shadai Kagura won the Elfin Stakes (Open) at Kyoto in February and the Pegasus Stakes (GIII) at Hanshin in March.

On April 9, she contested the Oka Shō (GI) at Hanshin. Drawn in the extreme outside post (18 of 18), she started slowly and was positioned at the rear. Take guided her through the inner rail on the final turn to recover ground, and she finished strongly to defeat Hokuto Venus by a neck. She became the first horse since Sugihime in 1961 to win the Oka Shō from the outside post.

On May 21, she finished second in the Yushun Himba (GI) at Tokyo Racecourse, beaten a neck by Light Color.

On October 22, she won the Rose Stakes (GII) at Kyoto by 1.5 lengths. On November 12, she contested the Queen Elizabeth II Cup (GI) at Kyoto as her retirement race. She was positioned in second place entering the third turn but suddenly decelerated and finished last (20th), beaten 7.6 seconds by Sand Piaris. She was found to have ruptured the suspensory ligament in her right foreleg.

== Statistics ==
The following table details all 11 starts of Shadai Kagura's racing career based on official netkeiba and JBIS records.

Date	Distance (Condition)	Race	Class	Course	Odds (Favourite)	Field	Finish	Time	Jockey	Winning (Losing) Margin	Winner (2nd Place)	Ref
1988 – two-year-old season
Jun 19	Dirt 1000 m (Soft)	3-Y-O Newcomer	Maiden	Sapporo	6.1 (4th)	7	2nd	1:00.1	Masato Shibata	1.2	Matsu Swift	
Jul 3	Dirt 1000 m (Firm)	3-Y-O Newcomer	Maiden	Sapporo	1.1 (1st)	5	1st	1:02.1	Masato Shibata	–0.1	(Super One)	
Oct 22	Turf 1400 m (Good)	Rindo Sho	Allowance	Kyoto	5.7 (3rd)	10	1st	1:24.8	Yutaka Take	–0.1	(Miss Junius)	
Nov 26	Turf 1600 m (Firm)	Kyoto Sansai Stakes	Open	Kyoto	3.2 (1st)	10	1st	1:37.8	Yutaka Take	–0.7	(Lucky Guerlain)	
Dec 11	Turf 1600 m (Firm)	Radio Tampa Hai Sansai Himba Stakes	GIII	Hanshin	1.6 (1st)	11	2nd	1:36.1	Yutaka Take	0.0	Tanino Target	
1989 – three-year-old season
Feb 5	Turf 1600 m (Firm)	Elfin Stakes	Open	Kyoto	1.6 (1st)	9	1st	1:36.2	Yutaka Take	–0.8	(Light Color)	
Mar 5	Turf 1600 m (Soft)	Pegasus Stakes	GIII	Hanshin	2.2 (1st)	14	1st	1:37.5	Yutaka Take	–0.2	(Narcisse Noir)	
Apr 9	Turf 1600 m (Good)	Oka Shō	GI	Hanshin	2.2 (1st)	18	1st	1:37.5	Yutaka Take	0.0	(Hokuto Venus)	
May 21	Turf 2400 m (Good)	Yushun Himba	GI	Tokyo	1.8 (1st)	24	2nd	2:29.0	Yutaka Take	0.0	Light Color	
Oct 22	Turf 2000 m (Good)	Rose Stakes	GII	Kyoto	1.6 (1st)	10	1st	2:01.5	Yutaka Take	–0.2	(Shinei Lotus)	
Nov 12	Turf 2400 m (Firm)	Queen Elizabeth II Cup	GI	Kyoto	2.2 (1st)	20	20th	2:36.4	Yutaka Take	7.6	Sand Peeress	

== Broodmare career ==
Following her retirement, Shadai Kagura returned to Nojima Bokujo as a broodmare. She produced seven named foals between 1991 and 2003, though her reproductive record was poor, with several miscarriages and barren years. She was moved to Biratori Bokujo in Biratori, Hokkaido, in 2002. She died of a ruptured aneurysm on April 4, 2005, at the age of 19.

== Pedigree ==
Pedigree of Shadai Kagura (JPN)
Sire Real Shadai (USA) 1979	Roberto (USA); 1969	Hail to Reason	Turn-to
Sire Real Shadai (USA) 1979	Roberto (USA); 1969	Hail to Reason	Nothirdchance
Sire Real Shadai (USA) 1979	Roberto (USA); 1969	Bramalea	Nashua
Sire Real Shadai (USA) 1979	Roberto (USA); 1969	Bramalea	Rarelea
Sire Real Shadai (USA) 1979	Desert Vixen (USA); 1970	In Reality	Intentionally
Sire Real Shadai (USA) 1979	Desert Vixen (USA); 1970	In Reality	My Dear Girl
Sire Real Shadai (USA) 1979	Desert Vixen (USA); 1970	Desert Trial	Moslem Chief
Sire Real Shadai (USA) 1979	Desert Vixen (USA); 1970	Desert Trial	Scotch Verdict
Dam Milly Bird (JPN) 1976	Faberge (FR); 1961	Princely Gift	Nasrullah
Dam Milly Bird (JPN) 1976	Faberge (FR); 1961	Princely Gift	Blanche
Dam Milly Bird (JPN) 1976	Faberge (FR); 1961	Spring Offensive	Charles o'Malley
Dam Milly Bird (JPN) 1976	Faberge (FR); 1961	Spring Offensive	Wild Arum
Dam Milly Bird (JPN) 1976	Lavatera (IRE); 1970	Le Haar	Roi Herode
Dam Milly Bird (JPN) 1976	Lavatera (IRE); 1970	Le Haar	Vahren
Dam Milly Bird (JPN) 1976	Lavatera (IRE); 1970	Begonia	Sundridge
Dam Milly Bird (JPN) 1976	Lavatera (IRE); 1970	Begonia	Americus Girl

- Shadai Kagura is inbred 5 × 4 to Nasrullah.
- Her half-sister Taisei Kagura (by Morning Frolic) is the granddam of Straight Girl, winner of the 2015 Victoria Mile (GI) and 2015 Sprinters Stakes (GI).

== See also ==
- Thoroughbred racing in Japan
- Oka Shō
- Yutaka Take
