= Rose Stakes =

Japanese horse race

Rose Stakes ローズステークス
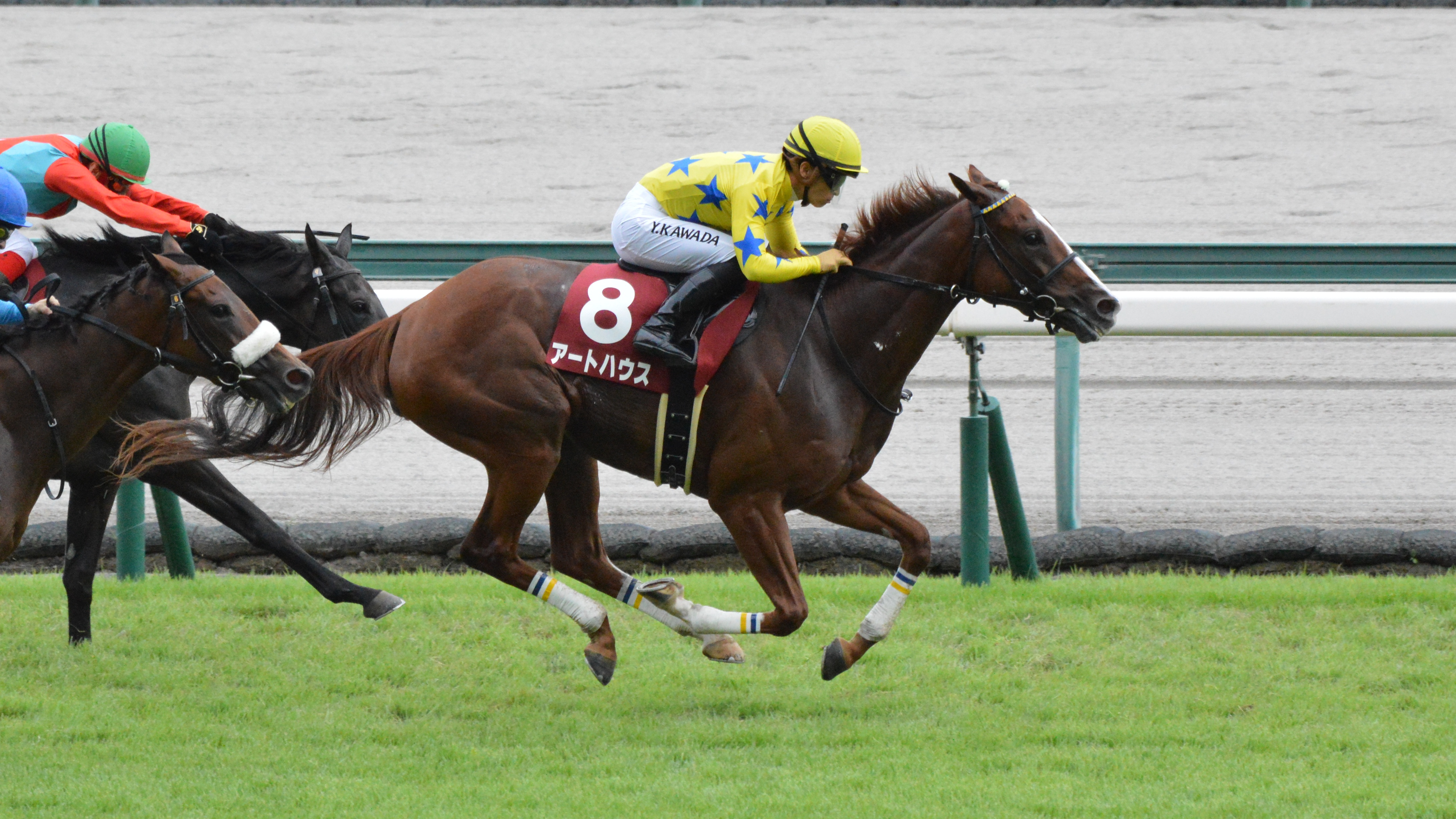
- Art House winning the 2022 Rose Stakes
- Class: Grade 2
- Location: Hanshin Racecourse
- Inaugurated: 1983
- Race type: Thoroughbred Flat racing

Race information
- Distance: 1800 metres
- Surface: Turf
- Track: Right-handed
- Qualification: 3-y-o fillies
- Weight: 55 kg
- Purse: ¥ 112,520,000 (as of 2025): 1st: ¥ 52,000,000; 2nd: ¥ 21,000,000; 3rd: ¥ 13,000,000

The Rose Stakes (Japanese ローズステークス) is a Japanese Grade 2 flat horse race in Hyōgo Prefecture for three-year-old Thoroughbred fillies. It is run over a distance of 1800 metres at Hanshin Racecourse in September, having been run over 2000 metres until 2006.

The Rose Stakes was first run in 1983 and was elevated to Grade 2 status in 1984. It serves as a trial race for the Shuka Sho, which is run in October and is the final leg of the Japanese Fillies' Triple Crown. Winners of the Rose Stakes have included Daiwa Scarlet, Gentildonna and Sinhalite.

== Winners since 2000 ==
Year	Winner	Jockey	Trainer	Owner	Time
2000	Nihon Pillow Swan	Yuichi Fukunaga	Tanaka Kotaro	Hyakutaro Kobayashi	2:00.3
2001	Diamond Biko	Mikio Matsunaga	Kazuo Fujisawa	Shinobu Osako	2:01.9
2002	Fine Motion	Mikio Matsunaga	Yuji Ito	Tatsuo Fushikida	2:00.1
2003	Admire Groove	Yutaka Take	Mitsuru Hashida	Riichi Kondo	2:01.5
2004	Les Clefs d'Or	Katsumi Ando	Yasuo Ikee	Sunday Racing	1:59.0
2005	Air Messiah	Yutaka Take	Yasunori Ito	Lucky Field	2:00.1
2006 (Note: The race took place at Chukyo Racecourse over 2,000 meters)	Admire Kiss	Yutaka Take	Hiroyoshi Matsuda	Riichi Kondo	1:58.2
2007	Daiwa Scarlet	Katsumi Ando	Kunihide Matsuda	Keizo Oshiro	1:46.1
2008	Meine Ratsel	Yuga Kawada	Tadao Igarashi	Thoroughbred Club Ruffian	1:47.3
2009	Broad Street	Shinji Fujita	Hideaki Fujiwara	Shimokobe Farm	1:44.7
2010	Animate Bio	Hiroki Goto	Koji Maki	Bio	1:45.8
2011	Whale Capture	Kenichi Ikezoe	Kiyotaka Tanaka	Ken Shimada	1:48.1
2012	Gentildonna	Yasunari Iwata	Sei Ishizaka	Sunday Racing	1:46.8
2013	Denim And Ruby	Hiroyuki Uchida	Katsuhiko Sumii	Kaneko Makoto Holdings	1:47.7
2014	Nuovo Record	Yasunari Iwata	Makoto Saito	Reiko Hara	1:46.0
2015	Touching Speech	Christophe Lemaire	Sei Ishizaka	Sunday Racing	1:45.2
2016	Sinhalite	Kenichi Ikezoe	Sei Ishizaka	Carrot Farm	1:46.7
2017	Rabbit Run	Ryuji Wada	Katsuhiko Sumii	Kazuko Yoshida	1:45.5
2018	Cantabile	Christophe Lemaire	Kazuya Nakatake	Tatsue Ishikawa	1:45.7
2019	Danon Fantasy	Yuga Kawada	Mitsumasa Nakauchida	Danox	1:44.4
2020	Ria Amelia	Yuga Kawada	Mitsumasa Nakauchida	Silk Racing	1:59.9
2021	Andvaranaut	Yuichi Fukunaga	Manabu Ikezoe	Sunday Racing	2:00.0
2022	Art House	Yuga Kawada	Mitsumasa Nakauchida	H. H. Sheikh Fahad	1:58.5
2023	Masked Diva	Mirai Iwata	Yasuyuki Tsujino	Shadai Race Horse	1:43.0 (Note: Set a course record)
2024	Queen's Walk	Yuga Kawada	Mitsumasa Nakauchida	Sunday Racing	1:59.9
2025	Kamunyak	Yuga Kawada	Yasuo Tomomichi	Kaneko Makoto Holdings	1:43.5
2026	Monroe Walk	Keita Tosaki	Hiroyuki Uemura	M's Racing	1:44.5

== Earlier winners ==
- 1983 - Long Grace
- 1984 - Long Leather
- 1985 - Takeno Hinami
- 1986 - Mejiro Ramonu
- 1987 - Max Beauty
- 1988 - Shiyono Roman
- 1989 - Shadai Kagura
- 1990 - Katsuno Jo
- 1991 - Rinden Lily
- 1992 - El Casa River
- 1993 - Star Ballerina
- 1994 - Hishi Amazon
- 1995 - Silent Happiness
- 1996 - Hishi Natalie
- 1997 - Kyoei March
- 1998 - Phalaenopsis
- 1999 - Hishi Pinnacle

== See also ==
- Horse racing in Japan
- List of Japanese flat horse races
