= JRA Award for Best Three-Year-Old Filly =

Japanese thoroughbred horse racing award

The JRA Award for Best Three-Year-Old Filly is a title awarded annually by the Japan Racing Association (JRA) to an outstanding horse of that category in Thoroughbred horse racing in Japan. Since 1987 the honor has been part of the JRA Awards.

== Winners ==
Year	Horse	Trainer	Owner
1987	Max Beauty	Yuji Ito	Y Tadokoro
1988	Ara Hotoku	Hozumi Shono	Araki Farm
1989	Shadai Kagura	Yuji Ito	Shigeru Yoneda
1990	Agnes Flora	Hiroyuki Nagahama	Takao Watanabe
1991	Sister Tosho	Akio Tsurudome	Tosho Industry
1992	Nishino Flower	Masahiro Matsuda	Masayuki Nishiyama
1993	Vega	Hiroshi Matsuda	Kazuko Yoshida
1994	Hishi Amazon	Takao Nakano	Abe Masaichiro
1995	Dance Partner	Toshiaki Shirai	Katsumi Yoshida
1996	Fabulous la Fouine	Hiroyuki Nagahama	Kazuko Yoshida
1997	Mejiro Dober	Yokichi Okubo	Mejiro Shoji
1998	Phalaenopsis	Mitsumasa Hamada	North Hills Management
1999	Umeno Fiber	Ikuo Aizawa	T Umezaki
2000	Cheers Grace	Kenji Yamauchi	Kazue Kitamura
2001	T M Ocean	Katsuichi Nishiura	Masatsugu Takezono
2002	Fine Motion	Yuji Ito	Tatsuo Fushikida
2003	Still in Love	Shoichi Matsumoto	North Hills Management
2004	Dance in the Mood	Kazuo Fujisawa	Shadai Race Horse
2005	Cesario	Katsuhiko Sumii	Carrot Farm
2006	Kawakami Princess	Katsuichi Nishiura	Mitsuishi Kawakami Bokujo
2007	Daiwa Scarlet	Kunihide Matsuda	Keizo Ōshiro
2008	Little Amapola	Hiroyuki Nagahama	Shadai Race Horse
2009	Buena Vista	Hiroshi Matsuda	Sunday Racing
2010	Apapane	Sakae Kunieda	Kaneko Makoto Holdings Co Ltd
2011	Aventura	Katsuhiko Sumii	Carrot Farm
2012	Gentildonna	Sei Ishizaka	Sunday Racing Co.
2013	Meisho Mambo	Akihiro Iida	Yoshio Matsumoto
2014	Harp Star	Akihiro Iida	Hiroyoshi Matsuda
2015	Mikki Queen	Yasutoshi Ikee	Mizuki Noda
2016	Sinhalite	Sei Ishizaka	U Carrot Farm
2017	Soul Stirring	Kazuo Fujisawa	Shadai Race Horse Co Ltd
2018	Almond Eye	Sakae Kunieda	Silk Racing Co, Ltd
2019	Gran Alegria	Kazuo Fujisawa	Sunday Racing
2020	Daring Tact	Haruki Sugiyama	Normandy Thoroughbred Racing
2021	Sodashi	Naosuke Sugai	Kaneko Makoto Holdings Co. Ltd.
2022	Stars On Earth	Mizuki Takayanagi	Shadai Race Horse
2023	Liberty Island	Mitsumasa Nakauchida	Sunday Racing
2024	Cervinia	Tetsuya Kimura	Sunday Racing
2025	Embroidery	Kazutomo Mori	Silk Racing Co, Ltd
