= Sapporo Kinen =

Sapporo Kinen 札幌記念
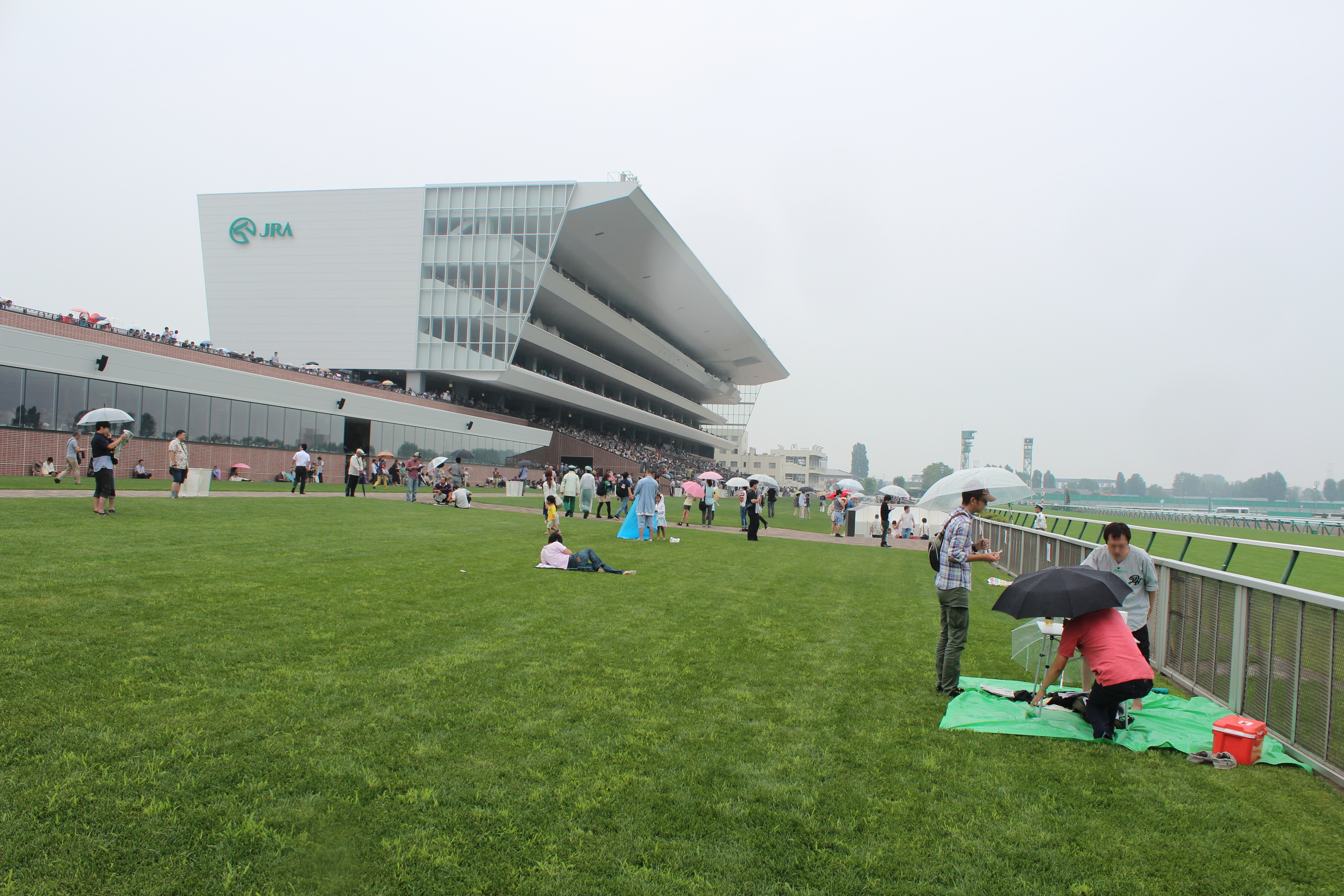
- Sapporo Racecourse
- Class: Grade 2
- Location: Sapporo Racecourse
- Inaugurated: 1965
- Race type: Thoroughbred Flat racing

Race information
- Distance: 2000 metres
- Surface: Turf
- Track: Right-handed
- Qualification: 3-y-o +
- Weight: 4-y-o+ 58 kg, 3-y-o 55 kg Allowance: Fillies & Mares 2 kg
- Purse: ¥ 151,700,000 (as of 2025): 1st: ¥ 70,000,000; 2nd: ¥ 28,000,000; 3rd: ¥ 18,000,000

The Sapporo Kinen (Japanese 札幌記念) is a Grade 2 Handicap horse race in Japan for Thoroughbreds aged three and above run in August over a distance of 2,000 metres at Sapporo Racecourse.

It was first run in 1965 and was promoted to Grade 3 in 1984. The race was elevated to Grade 2 class in 1997. The race serves as a trial race for the autumn edition of the Tenno Sho.

== Winners since 2000 ==
Year	Winner	Age	Jockey	Trainer	Owner	Time
2000	Daiwa Caerleon	7	Hiroki Tanaka	Yoshitaka Ninomiya	Daiwa Shoji	1:59.9
2001	Air Eminem	3	Masayoshi Ebina	Yuji Ito	Lucky Field	2:00.1
2002	T. M. Ocean	4	Masaru Honda	Katsuichi Nishiura	Masatsugu Takezono	1:59.5
2003	Sakura President	3	Yutaka Take	Futoshi Kojima	Sakura Commerce	2:00.3
2004	Fine Motion	5	Yutaka Take	Yuji Ito	Tatsuo Fushikida	2:00.4
2005	Heavenly Romance	5	Mikio Matsunaga	Shoji Yamamoto	North Hills Management	2:01.1
2006	Admire Moon	3	Yutaka Take	Hiroyoshi Matsuda	Riichi Kondo	2:00.3
2007	Fusaichi Pandora	4	Shinji Fujita	Toshiaki Shirai	Fusao Sekiguchi	2:00.1
2008	Tascata Sorte	4	Norihiro Yokoyama	Hideaki Fuiwara	Shadai Race Horse	1:58.6
2009	Yamanin Kingly	4	Yuichi Shibayama	Hiroshi Kawachi	Hajime Doi	2:00.7
2010	Earnestly	5	Tetsuzo Sato	Shozo Sasaki	Koji Maeda	1:59.4
2011	Tosen Jordan	5	Yuichi Fukunaga	Yasutoshi Ikee	Takaya Shimakawa	2:00.4
2012	Fumino Imagine	6	Keisuke Dazai	Masaru Honda	Tsuzuku Tani	1:58.7
2013	Tokei Halo ^{[1]}	4	Yutaka Take	Hisashi Shimizu	Nobuhiko Kimura	2:06.5
2014	Harp Star	3	Yuga Kawada	Hiroyoshi Matsuda	Carrot Farm	1:59.1
2015	Decipher	6	Hirofumi Shii	Futoshi Kojima	H. H. Sheikh Mohammed	1:59.0
2016	Neorealism	5	Christophe Lemaire	Nobuyuki Hori	Carrot Farm	2:01.7
2017	Sakura Empereur	6	Masayoshi Ebina	Takashi Kanari	Sakura Commerce	2:00.4
2018	Sungrazer	4	Yuichi Fukunaga	Hidekazu Asami	G1 Racing	2:01.1
2019	Blast Onepiece	4	Yuga Kawada	Masahiro Otake	Silk Racing	2:00.1
2020	Normcore	5	Norihiro Yokoyama	Kiyoshi Hagiwara	Seiichi Iketani	1:59.4
2021	Sodashi	3	Hayato Yoshida	Naosuke Sugai	Kaneko Makoto Holdings	1:59.5
2022	Jack d'Or	4	Yusuke Fujioka	Kenichi Fujioka	Toshiyuki Maehara	2:01.2
2023	Prognosis	5	Yuga Kawada	Mitsumasa Nakauchida	Shadai Race Horse	2:01.5
2024	North Bridge	6	Yasunari Iwata	Takeshi Okumura	Noboru Iyama	1:59.6
2025	Top Knife	5	Norihiro Yokoyama	Mitsugu Kon	Koji Yasuhara	2:01.5
2026	Shake Your Heart	6	Yoshihiro Furukawa	Toru Miya	Chizu Yoshida	1:58.2

^{1} The 2013 race took place at Hakodate Racecourse.

== Earlier winners ==
- 1965 - Hatsurai O
- 1966 - Tamshi Yusho
- 1967 - Apo Onward
- 1968 - Martis
- 1969 - Martis
- 1970 - Hide Kabuto
- 1971 - Apo Speed
- 1972 - Cinema Ghost
- 1973 - Haku Hosho
- 1974 - Elimo Martis
- 1975 - Tsukisamu Homare
- 1976 - Great Seikan
- 1977 - Lancelot
- 1978 - Taihou Hero
- 1979 - Terno Eight
- 1980 - Mercury Silver
- 1981 - Kitano Rikio
- 1982 - Over Rainbow
- 1983 - Over Rainbow
- 1984 - Roller King
- 1985 - Rikisan Power
- 1986 - Life Tateyama
- 1987 - Foster Musashi
- 1988 - Kobano Rich
- 1989 - Dyna Letter
- 1990 - Great Monte
- 1991 - Mejiro Palmer
- 1992 - Sanei Thank You
- 1993 - Narita Chikara
- 1994 - Hokuto Vega
- 1995 - Super Play
- 1996 - Marvelous Sunday
- 1997 - Air Groove
- 1998 - Air Groove
- 1999 - Seiun Sky

== See also ==
- Horse racing in Japan
- List of Japanese flat horse races
