= Tulip Sho =

Tulip Sho チューリップ賞
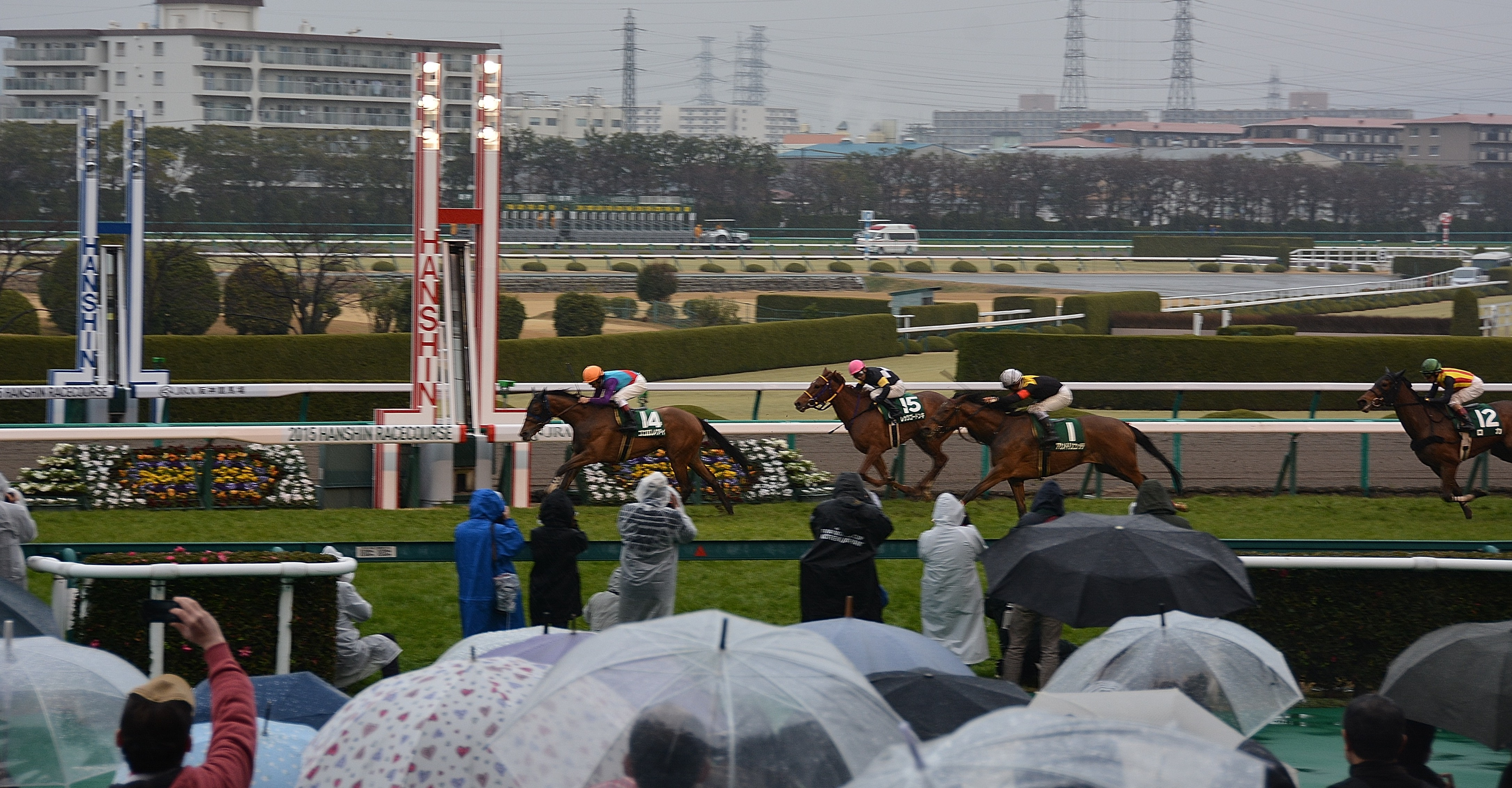
- Kokorono Ai wins the 2015 Tulip Sho
- Class: Grade 2
- Location: Hanshin Racecourse, Takarazuka, Hyogo.
- Inaugurated: 1984
- Race type: Thoroughbred Flat racing

Race information
- Distance: 1600 metres
- Surface: Turf
- Track: Right-handed
- Qualification: 3-y-o fillies
- Weight: 55 kg
- Purse: ¥ 112,520,000 (as of 2026): 1st: ¥ 52,000,000; 2nd: ¥ 21,000,000; 3rd: ¥ 13,000,000

The Tulip Sho (チューリップ賞) is a Japanese Grade 2 flat horse race in Japan for three-year-old Thoroughbred fillies run over a distance of 1,600 metres at Hanshin Racecourse, Takarazuka, Hyogo. The race is run in March and serves as a major trial race for the Oka Sho, which is run at the same racecourse in early April.

The Tulip Sho was first run in 1984. It became a Grade 3 race in 1994 and was elevated to Grade 2 status in 2018. Among the winners of the race have been Air Groove, Sweep Tosho, Vodka, Buena Vista, Harp Star and Sinhalite.

== Past winners ==
Year	Winner	Jockey	Trainer	Owner	Time
1984	Urakawa Miyuki	Masahiro Matsunaga	Yoshiharu Matsunaga	Hachiro Sasaki	1:37.8
1985	Aino Sachi	Hiroshi Masui	Kenji Domon	Kyoko Tanaka	1:38.1
1986	Reiho Tholon	Yoshiyuki Muramoto	Minoru Kobayashi	Tatsuo Nomura	1:36.9
1987	Max Beauty	Seiki Tabara	Yuji Ito	Yu Tadokoro	1:38.2
1988	Shiyono Roman	Yutaka Take	Hozumi Shono	Akihiko Shono	1:37.5
1989	Youngest City	Masaru Honda	Izumi Shimizu	Yushun Horse Club	1:36.8
1990	Agnes Flora	Hiroshi Kawachi	Hiroyuki Nagahama	Takao Watanabe	1:36.4
1991	Sister Tosho	Koichi Tsunoda	Akio Tsurudome	Tosho Sangyo	1:44.1
1992	Adorable	Yoshiyuki Muramoto	Minoru Kobayashi	Haruo Negishi	1:38.5
1993	Vega	Yutaka Take	Hiroyoshi Matsuda	Kazuko Yoshida	1:36.8
1994	Agnes Parade	Hiroshi Kawachi	Hiroyuki Nagahama	Takao Watanabe	1:43.8
1995	Yuki Vivace	Mitsuo Matsunaga	Hitoshi Arai	Hideki Yukimoto	1:35.1
1996	Air Groove	Olivier Peslier	Yuji Ito	Tsunebumi Yoshihara	1:34.2
1997	Orange Peel	Hiroshi Kawachi	Kenji Yamauchi	Shadai Race Horse	1:37.7
1998	Dantsu Sirius	Hirofumi Shii	Kenji Yamauchi	Tetsuji Yamamoto	1:36.9
1999	Eishin Rudens	Akiyoshi Nomoto	Akira Nomoto	Toyomitsu Hirai	1:35.1
2000	Jo De Shiraoki	Koshiro Take	Kunihide Matsuda	Taisei Bokujo	1:39.7
2001	T. M. Ocean	Masaru Honda	Katsuichi Nishiura	Masatsugu Takezono	1:35.3
2002	Health Wall	Mirco Demuro	Hideyuki Mori	Yoshitaka Suzuki	1:35.2
2003	Osumi Haruka	Katsumi Ando	Masatoshi Ando	Hidenori Yamaji	1:35.9
2004	Sweep Tosho	Kenichi Ikezoe	Akio Tsurudome	Tosho Sangyo	1:35.5
2005	Eishin Tender	Koshiro Take	Kunihiko Take	Toyomitsu Hirai	1:35.3
2006	Admire Kiss	Yutaka Take	Hiroyoshi Matsuda	Riichi Kondo	1:36.5
2007	Vodka	Hirofumi Shii	Katsuhiko Sumii	Yuzo Tanimizu	1:33.7
2008	Air Pascale	Yusuke Fujioka	Yasutoshi Ikee	Lucky Field	1:35.8
2009	Buena Vista	Katsumi Ando	Hiroyoshi Matsuda	Sunday Racing	1:36.5
2010	Shoryu Moon	Takeshi Kimura	Shozo Sasaki	Wataru Ueda	1:36.1
2011	Reve d'Essor	Yuichi Fukunaga	Hiroyoshi Matsuda	Sunday Racing	1:34.5
2012	Hana's Goal	Cristian Demuro	Kazuhiro Kato	Michael Tabert	1:35.5
2013	Kurofune Surprise	Yutaka Take	Hidetaka Tadokoro	Seisuke Hata	1:34.9
2014	Harp Star	Yuga Kawada	Hiroyoshi Matsuda	Carrot Farm	1:34.3
2015	Kokorono Ai	Norihiro Yokoyama	Tomohito Ozeki	Sakai Bokujo	1:37.47
2016	Sinhalite	Kenichi Ikezoe	Sei Ishikawa	Carrot Farm	1:32.8
2017	Soul Stirring	Christophe Lemaire	Kazuo Fujisawa	Shadai Race Horse	1:33.2
2018	Lucky Lilac	Shu Ishibashi	Mikio Matsunaga	Sunday Racing	1:33.4
2019	Danon Fantasy	Yuga Kawada	Mitsumasa Nakauchida	Danox	1:34.1
2020	Maltese Diosa	Hironobu Tanabe	Takahisa Tezuka	Yoshio Fujita	1:33.3
2021	Elizabeth Tower (DH)	Yuga Kawada	Tomokazu Takano	Shadai Race Horse	1:33.8
2021	Meikei Yell (DH)	Yutaka Take	Hidenori Take	Nagoya Keiba	1:33.8
2022	Namur	Takeshi Yokoyama	Tomokazu Takano	Carrot Farm	1:33.2
2023	Mozu Meimei	Yutaka Take	Hidetaka Otonashi	Capital System	1:34.0
2024	Sweep Feet	Yutaka Take	Yasushi Shono	YGG Horse Club	1:33.1
2025	Kurino Mei	Manabu Sakai	Naosuke Sugai	Eriko Kurimoto	1:34.0
2026	Taisei Vogue	Atsuya Nishimura	Takeshi Matsushita	Seiho Tanaka	1:34.3

== See also ==
- Horse racing in Japan
- List of Japanese flat horse races
