= Curran =

Curran may refer to:

== People and fictional characters ==
- Curran (surname), including a list of people and fictional characters
- Curran (given name), a list of people

== Places ==
=== United States ===
- Curran, Illinois, a village
- Curran Township, Sangamon County, Illinois
- Curran, Michigan, an unincorporated community
- Curran, Wisconsin, a town
- Curran, Kewaunee County, Wisconsin, an unincorporated community

=== Elsewhere ===
- Curran, a community in Alfred and Plantagenet, Ontario, Canada
- Curran, County Londonderry, Northern Ireland, a village and townland
- Curran Bluff, Graham Land, Antarctica

== Other uses ==
- Curran Theatre, San Francisco
- Cort Theatre (San Francisco), formerly Curran Theatre
- Curran Steels, a former manufacturing company in Cardiff, Wales
- Curran (material)

== See also ==
- Curran Hall, Little Rock, Arkansas, United States, a house on the National Register of Historic Places
- Curan, a commune in southern France
- Currans, a village in County Kerry, Ireland
- Curren (disambiguation)
- Corran (disambiguation), places in Scotland
- Coran (disambiguation)
