= Ten Happy Rose =

Japanese Thoroughbred racehorse (foaled 2018)

Ten Happy Rose; テンハッピーローズ
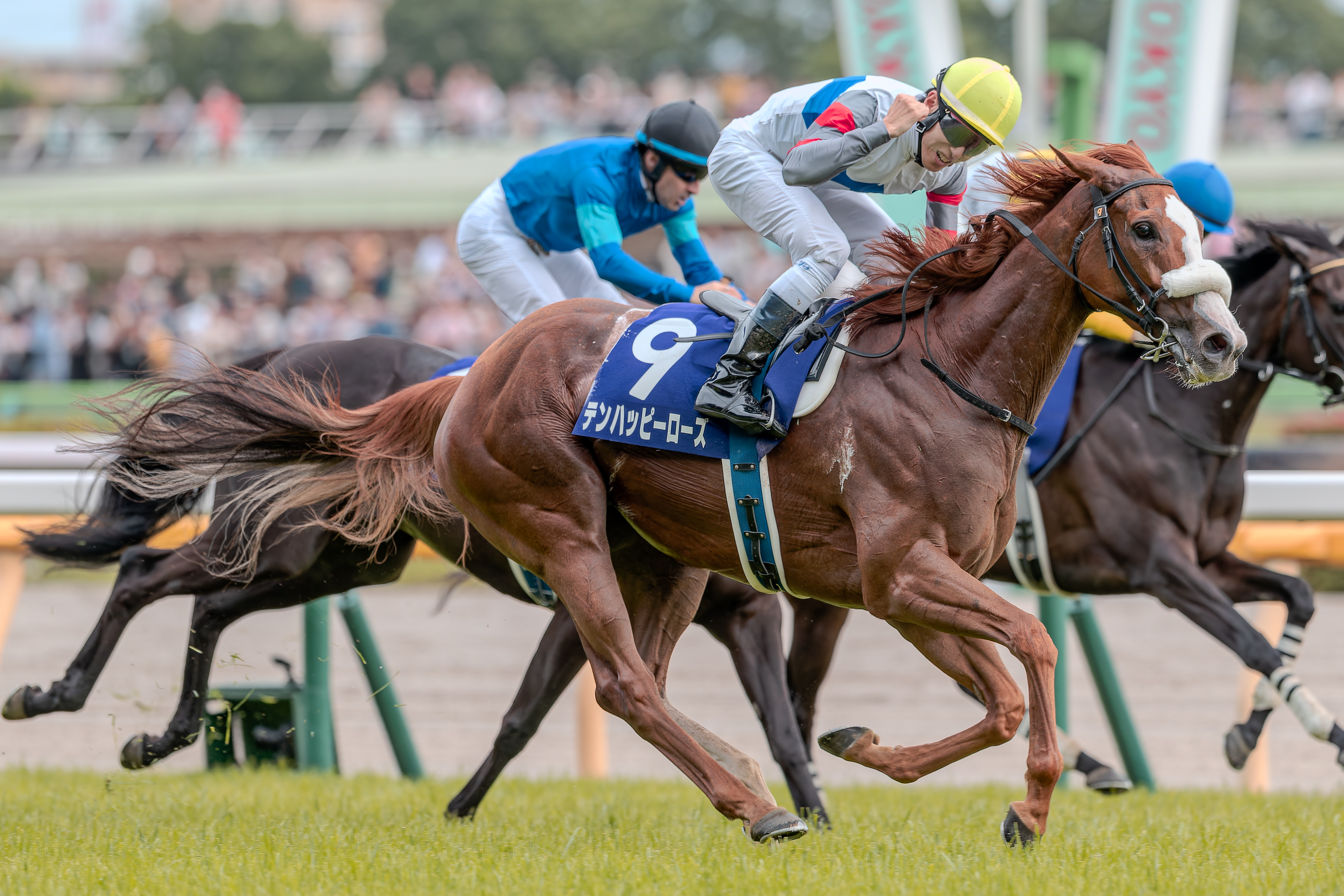
- Ten Happy Rose after winning the 2024 Victoria Mile
- Breed: Thoroughbred
- Sire: Epiphaneia
- Grandsire: Symboli Kris S
- Dam: Fatal Rose
- Damsire: Tanino Gimlet
- Sex: Mare
- Foaled: 26 February 2018 (age 8)
- Country: Japan
- Colour: Chestnut
- Breeder: Shadai Farm
- Owner: Taiji Tenpaku
- Racing colours
- Trainer: Daisuke Takayanagi
- Jockey: Akihide Tsumura
- Record: 27: 6-5-2
- Earnings: ¥282,993,300

Major wins
- Victoria Mile (2024); Toki Stakes (2023)

Ten Happy Rose (Japanese: テンハッピーローズ, Ten Happī Rōzu; foaled 26 February 2018) is a retired Japanese Thoroughbred racehorse and broodmare. She competed from 2020 to 2025, recording six wins from twenty-seven starts, including the Victoria Mile (GI) in 2024 and the Toki Stakes (Listed) in 2023. Her Victoria Mile victory at odds of 208.6 (14th favourite) was one of the largest upsets in the race's history and gave jockey Akihide Tsumura his first JRA GI win.

== Background ==
Ten Happy Rose is a chestnut mare bred in Chitose, Hokkaido, by Shadai Farm. She was sired by Epiphaneia, a son of Symboli Kris S, and her dam was Fatal Rose (フェータルローズ), a mare by Tanino Gimlet. She is owned by Taiji Tenpaku and was trained by Daisuke Takayanagi at the JRA's Ritto Training Center.

== Racing career ==
=== 2020: two-year-old season ===
Ten Happy Rose debuted on 15 August 2020 in a maiden race at Kokura Racecourse, winning by 0.2 seconds. She finished second in the Saffron Sho at Nakayama Racecourse on 4 October and third in the Artemis Stakes (GIII) at Tokyo Racecourse on 31 October.

=== 2021: three-year-old season ===
Ten Happy Rose finished fourth in the Fairy Stakes (GIII) on 11 January and tenth in the Tulip Sho (GII) on 6 March. She won two 1-win class races at Hanshin Racecourse and Niigata Racecourse in June and August. She finished second in the Rokko Island Stakes on 19 December.

=== 2022: four-year-old season ===
Ten Happy Rose won the Freeway Stakes (3-win class) at Tokyo on 22 May, gaining open-class status. She finished fourth in the Toki Stakes (Listed) on 28 August and second in the Shinetsu Stakes (Listed) on 16 October.

=== 2023: five-year-old season ===
Ten Happy Rose finished sixth in the Kyoto Himba Stakes (GIII) on 18 February and seventh in the Hanshin Himba Stakes (GII) on 8 April. On 27 August, she won the Toki Stakes (Listed) at Niigata, recording her first open-race victory.

=== 2024: six-year-old season ===
Ten Happy Rose finished seventh in the Kyoto Himba Stakes (GIII) on 17 February and sixth in the Hanshin Himba Stakes (GII) on 6 April. On 12 May, she won the Victoria Mile (GI) at Tokyo at odds of 208.6 (14th favourite), defeating Fierce Pride by 0.2 seconds. The win was a major upset and gave jockey Akihide Tsumura his first JRA GI victory. She finished seventh in the Centaur Stakes (GII) on 8 September. On 2 November, she contested the Breeders' Cup Mile (G1) at Del Mar Racetrack, finishing fourth.

=== 2025: seven-year-old season ===
Ten Happy Rose finished seventh in the 1351 Turf Sprint (G2) at King Abdulaziz Racetrack on 22 February. She was retired on 5 March 2025 and entered stud at Shadai Farm. In 2025, she placed first in the retired-horse division of the Idol Horse Audition and was produced as a plushie.

== Statistics ==
The following table details all 27 starts of Ten Happy Rose's racing career. Record current as of 22 February 2025.

| Date | Distance (Condition) | Race | Class | Course | Odds (Favourite) | Field | Finish | Time | Jockey | Winning (Losing) Margin | Winner (2nd Place) | Ref |
|---|---|---|---|---|---|---|---|---|---|---|---|---|
2020 – two-year-old season
| Aug 15 | Turf 1200 m (Good) | 2-Y-O Newcomer | Maiden | Kokura | 16.5 (7th) | 18 | 1st | 1:08.4 | Yuichi Fukunaga | –0.2 | (Ange Soleil) | |
| Oct 4 | Turf 1600 m (Good) | Saffron Sho | Allowance | Nakayama | 5.8 (3rd) | 11 | 2nd | 1:35.4 | Yuichi Fukunaga | 0.2 | Satono Reinas | |
| Oct 31 | Turf 1600 m (Good) | Artemis Stakes | GIII | Tokyo | 6.4 (3rd) | 16 | 3rd | 1:35.3 | Hironobu Tanabe | 0.4 | Sodashi | |
2021 – three-year-old season
| Jan 11 | Turf 1600 m (Good) | Fairy Stakes | GIII | Nakayama | 2.6 (1st) | 16 | 4th | 1:35.1 | Yuichi Fukunaga | 0.7 | Fine Rouge | |
| Mar 6 | Turf 1600 m (Yielding) | Tulip Sho | GII | Hanshin | 14.1 (6th) | 12 | 10th | 1:34.6 | Kenichi Ikezoe | 0.8 | Meikei Yell | |
| Jun 13 | Turf 1600 m (Good) | 3-Y-O+ 1-Win | Allowance | Tokyo | 4.0 (2nd) | 10 | 2nd | 1:33.7 | Kosei Miura | 0.1 | Arabian Night | |
| Jun 26 | Turf 1400 m (Good) | 3-Y-O+ 1-Win | Allowance | Hanshin | 1.9 (1st) | 12 | 1st | 1:21.0 | Yuichi Fukunaga | –0.2 | (W Encore) | |
| Aug 14 | Turf 1400 m (Yielding) | Shibatajo Tokubetsu | Allowance | Niigata | 2.5 (1st) | 17 | 1st | 1:21.1 | Yuichi Fukunaga | –0.3 | (Dura Mondo) | |
| Dec 19 | Turf 1400 m (Good) | Rokko Island Stakes | Allowance | Hanshin | 3.4 (1st) | 15 | 2nd | 1:20.6 | Kohei Matsuyama | 0.5 | Tantalus | |
2022 – four-year-old season
| Jan 9 | Turf 1400 m (Good) | Shinsun Stakes | Allowance | Chukyo | 3.7 (2nd) | 16 | 7th | 1:20.9 | Kohei Matsuyama | 1.3 | Gray in Green | |
| Feb 6 | Turf 1400 m (Yielding) | Triton Stakes | Allowance | Chukyo | 2.6 (1st) | 10 | 6th | 1:21.5 | Yuichi Fukunaga | 0.3 | Vip Wink | |
| Apr 23 | Turf 1400 m (Good) | Banshun Stakes | Allowance | Tokyo | 7.4 (4th) | 18 | 2nd | 1:20.1 | Takeshi Yokoyama | 0.1 | Beautiful Day | |
| May 22 | Turf 1400 m (Good) | Freeway Stakes | Allowance | Tokyo | 4.1 (1st) | 17 | 1st | 1:20.9 | Yuichi Fukunaga | 0.0 | (Lucas) | |
| Aug 28 | Turf 1400 m (Good) | Toki Stakes | Listed | Niigata | 11.7 (5th) | 18 | 4th | 1:21.2 | Akihide Tsumura | 0.2 | Le Plus Fort | |
| Oct 16 | Turf 1400 m (Good) | Shinetsu Stakes | Listed | Niigata | 7.9 (3rd) | 18 | 2nd | 1:20.4 | Seina Imamura | 0.2 | Daddy's Vivid | |
| Nov 13 | Turf 1400 m (Good) | Aurora Cup | Listed | Tokyo | 6.9 (4th) | 18 | 6th | 1:20.9 | Seina Imamura | 0.3 | Win Charlotte | |
2023 – five-year-old season
| Feb 18 | Turf 1400 m (Good) | Kyoto Himba Stakes | GIII | Kyoto | 22.2 (9th) | 18 | 6th | 1:20.8 | Yuichi Fukunaga | 0.4 | La La Christine | |
| Apr 8 | Turf 1600 m (Yielding) | Hanshin Himba Stakes | GII | Hanshin | 56.8 (12th) | 12 | 7th | 1:34.4 | Kota Fujioka | 0.5 | Sound Vivace | |
| May 28 | Turf 1400 m (Good) | Azuchijo Stakes | Listed | Kyoto | 14.8 (6th) | 18 | 4th | 1:19.6 | Kota Fujioka | 0.6 | Mama Cocha | |
| Jun 25 | Turf 1400 m (Good) | Paradise Stakes | Listed | Tokyo | 6.2 (3rd) | 15 | 3rd | 1:20.7 | Akihide Tsumura | 0.1 | Beautiful Day | |
| Aug 27 | Turf 1400 m (Good) | Toki Stakes | Listed | Niigata | 5.5 (3rd) | 17 | 1st | 1:20.8 | Akihide Tsumura | –0.1 | (Thermal Wind) | |
2024 – six-year-old season
| Feb 17 | Turf 1400 m (Good) | Kyoto Himba Stakes | GIII | Kyoto | 29.4 (8th) | 18 | 7th | 1:20.6 | Akihide Tsumura | 0.3 | So Dazzling | |
| Apr 6 | Turf 1600 m (Good) | Hanshin Himba Stakes | GII | Hanshin | 62.8 (9th) | 11 | 6th | 1:33.4 | Akihide Tsumura | 0.4 | Masked Diva | |
| May 12 | Turf 1600 m (Good) | Victoria Mile | GI | Tokyo | 208.6 (14th) | 15 | 1st | 1:31.8 | Akihide Tsumura | –0.2 | (Fierce Pride) | |
| Sep 8 | Turf 1200 m (Good) | Centaur Stakes | GII | Chukyo | 10.7 (6th) | 18 | 7th | 1:08.2 | Akihide Tsumura | 0.5 | Toshin Macao | |
| Nov 2 | Turf 1600 m (Firm) | Breeders' Cup Mile | G1 | Del Mar | 58.8 (10th) | 10 | 4th | 1:33.10 | Akihide Tsumura | 0.45 | More Than Looks | |
2025 – seven-year-old season
| Feb 22 | Turf 1351 m (Fast) | 1351 Turf Sprint | G2 | King Abdulaziz | 16.0 (8th) | 13 | 7th | 1:19.78 | Akihide Tsumura | 1.9 | Ascoli Piceno | |

== Pedigree ==
Pedigree of Ten Happy Rose (JPN)
| Sire Epiphaneia (JPN) 2010 | Symboli Kris S (USA); 1999 | Kris S. | Roberto |
| Sire Epiphaneia (JPN) 2010 | Symboli Kris S (USA); 1999 | Kris S. | Sharp Queen |
| Sire Epiphaneia (JPN) 2010 | Symboli Kris S (USA); 1999 | Tee Kay | Gold Meridian |
| Sire Epiphaneia (JPN) 2010 | Symboli Kris S (USA); 1999 | Tee Kay | Tri Argo |
| Sire Epiphaneia (JPN) 2010 | Cesario (JPN); 2002 | Special Week | Sunday Silence |
| Sire Epiphaneia (JPN) 2010 | Cesario (JPN); 2002 | Special Week | Campaign Girl |
| Sire Epiphaneia (JPN) 2010 | Cesario (JPN); 2002 | Kirov Premiere | Sadler's Wells |
| Sire Epiphaneia (JPN) 2010 | Cesario (JPN); 2002 | Kirov Premiere | Querida |
| Dam Fatal Rose (JPN) 2009 | Tanino Gimlet (JPN); 1999 | Brian's Time | Roberto |
| Dam Fatal Rose (JPN) 2009 | Tanino Gimlet (JPN); 1999 | Brian's Time | Kelley's Day |
| Dam Fatal Rose (JPN) 2009 | Tanino Gimlet (JPN); 1999 | Tanino Crystal | Crystal Palace |
| Dam Fatal Rose (JPN) 2009 | Tanino Gimlet (JPN); 1999 | Tanino Crystal | Tanino Sea Bird |
| Dam Fatal Rose (JPN) 2009 | Primrose Eve (JPN); 2000 | Sunday Silence | Halo |
| Dam Fatal Rose (JPN) 2009 | Primrose Eve (JPN); 2000 | Sunday Silence | Wishing Well |
| Dam Fatal Rose (JPN) 2009 | Primrose Eve (JPN); 2000 | Oenothera | Night Shift |
| Dam Fatal Rose (JPN) 2009 | Primrose Eve (JPN); 2000 | Oenothera | Fruition |

- Ten Happy Rose is inbred 4 × 3 to Sunday Silence, 4 × 4 to Roberto, and 5 × 5 to Northern Dancer.
- Her sire Epiphaneia won the 2013 Kikuka Shō and 2014 Japan Cup.
- Her relatives include Durezza (2023 Kikuka Shō) and Summer Scent (2020 Mermaid Stakes).

== See also ==
- Thoroughbred racing in Japan
- Victoria Mile
