= Curren =

Curren may refer to

- Curren (name)
- Toyota Curren, a Japanese automobile
- Racehorses owned by Takashi Suzuki:
  - Curren Bouquetd'or (foaled 2016), Japanese Thoroughbred racehorse
  - Curren Chan (foaled 2007), Japanese Thoroughbred racehorse

== See also ==
- Curran (disambiguation)
