= Curran (material) =

Material made from nanocellulose fibers

Curran is a microcrystalline nanocellulose fibre derived from the pulp of root vegetables. It was developed by Scottish scientists David Hepworth and Eric Whale, with funding from the Scottish Government. The sources of root vegetable pulp used to manufacture Curran include carrots, sugar beets, and turnips. It is named after curran, the Scottish Gaelic word for "carrot". The material was developed as a potential substitute for carbon fibre and is often used in polymer composites. It has numerous industrial and technological applications, especially for the production of paints and sporting equipment.

== History ==
The material was developed by Scottish material scientists David Hepworth and Eric Whale, who met while studying for their PhDs at University of Reading. They began researching carrot-derived cellulose fibres in 2002. In 2004, they founded Cellucomp, Ltd. in Fife with funding from the Scottish government agency Scottish Enterprise. They hoped to develop a composite that could be a substitute for carbon fibre. The word curran means "carrot" in Scottish Gaelic, a reference to the fact that cellulose fibres from carrots were used to develop the material.

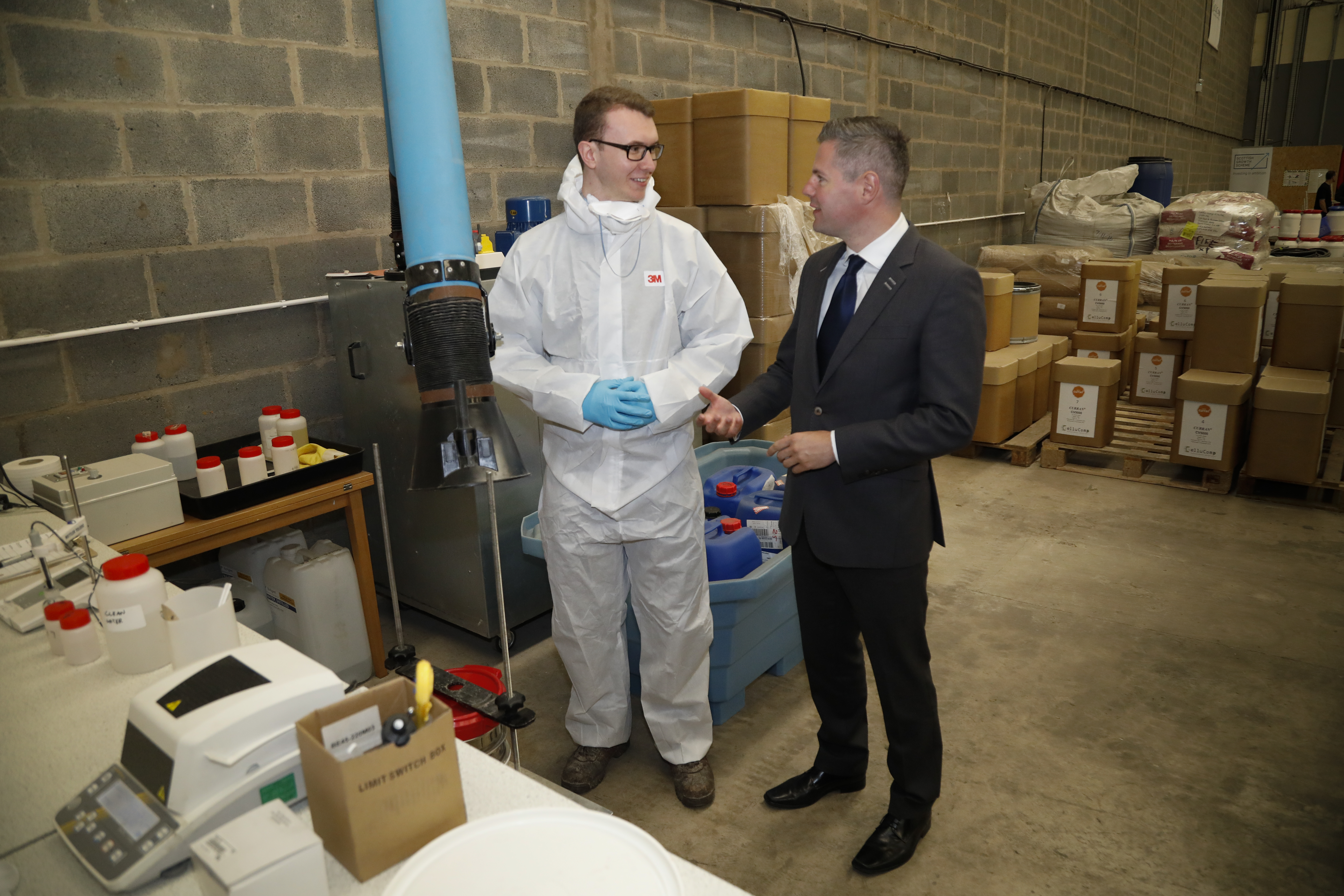
Scottish Finance Minister Derek Mackay visits a Cellucomp facility in 2017.

Root vegetables were selected over wood or cotton, which are more widely used in the production of nanofibres, because root vegetables grow faster and are easier to process. During early development, Whale and Hepworth's team bought large quantities of carrots from local grocery stores, finding them a cheap and convenient source of cellulose. They would typically buy four shopping trolleys full of carrots at a time, until their local stores could no longer keep up with the volume required and refused to sell them more carrots. After this, the scientists switched to purchasing B-grade carrots not fit for consumers directly from farmers.

The development team later began using sugar beet pulp, an agricultural byproduct of sugar production, as their source of cellulose. Beet pulp was even more widely available than carrots due to the scale of the global sugar industry. The process can also be applied to other root vegetables, such as turnips, rutabaga, and parsnips.

Hepworth and Whale received grant funding from the European Union's Framework Programmes for Research and Technological Development which they used to hire researchers from Swiss Federal Laboratories for Materials Science and Technology (EMPA). The EMPA researchers applied a multi-perspective application selection (MPAS) method to determine whether Curran could be efficiently produced and marketed on a large scale.

Cellucomp began producing Curran fibres for paint manufacturers in 2013 and moved to a new production facility that allowed them to increase production from 15 to 50 tons annually. In 2015, a new Cellucomp facility was unveiled in Glenrothes by Scottish Minister for Youth and Women's Employment Annabelle Ewing. The facility was reported to produce 400 tons of Curran per year, with plans to expand to 2000 tons per year.

By 2015, Cellucomp had received £1 million in grants from the Scottish government, including Scottish Enterprise. The company's growth was part of larger efforts to expand Scotland's biotechnology sector, per the country's National Plan for Industrial Biotechnology. The company also received £3 million of funding from private investors such as Claridge, Inc. and Sofinnova.

As of 2019, the company had plans to begin building a €22.6 million commercial scale facility.

== Production ==
During the production of Curran, vegetables are mechanically broken down to create a slurry of nanocellulose particles. The excess water is removed from the slurry, and the nanocellulose fibre is extracted. Whale described the processed fibres as being similar in consistency to Play-Doh. The fibres are then further processed by combining them with resins. Resins used to create Curran biocomposites include epoxy, polyurethane and polyester. Thermoset polymer-based Curran composites are strong and mouldable. Curran is sold in the form of a powder, granule or slurry for different applications and is typically sold in quantities of 15 kilograms.

Unlike other methods of separating cellulose fibres from root vegetable pulp, Curran production does not require fossil fuel-based chemicals. Manufacturing Curran also does not produce volatile organic compounds.

== Properties ==
Curran is based on microcrystalline nanocellulose particles, with properties similar to both carbon fibre-based composites and glass fibre composites. Its composition is around 80% root vegetable fibre and 20% oil. Its cellulose content is approximately 20%. Curran composites have a tensile strength of 5 gigapascals. Curran has a 5% strain to failure, and greater stiffness than glass composites. Because of its composition, it increases both the strength and viscosity of the products it is added to. The material is also biodegradeable.

== Applications ==
The material has applications for use in composite materials and as a reinforcing additive in construction, paints and coatings, drilling fluid, cosmetics, recycled paper, and sustainable packaging. Its strength means that it has applications for use in automobile and aerospace parts.

=== Paints and coatings ===
Curran improves the rheological properties of liquids such as plastics and paints. This increases the quality of paints, and can also prevent cracking. Curran is more ecologically friendly than many other alternatives used in paint manufacturing because of the lower energy costs involved in its production. However, it does not significantly impact the sustainability of paint since it makes up a small percentage of total ingredients.

=== Sports equipment ===
In 2007, Cellucomp partnered with the American sports equipment company E21 to produce a fly fishing rod made out of Curran. The rod, marketed as Carrot Stix, was bright orange colored. Carrot Stix were made out of 70% Curran wrapped around a thin carbon core. It was noted to be strong and significantly lighter than solely carbon-based rods. The rods were a commercial success, selling over 500,000 units. It won "Best Freshwater Rod" and "Best of Show" at the 2007 International Convention of Allied Sportfishing Trades. Cellucomp also marketed a similar brand of rods called Just Cast in the United Kingdom. After introducing Carrot Stix, they planned to produce snowboards.

EMPA's research found that out of possible applications, motorcycle helmets and surfboards were particularly likely applications for Curran due to the need for materials used in their construction to be lightweight and strong, and advised more development in this area.

=== Concrete ===
Curran has been used to strengthen concrete by increasing the amount of calcium silicate hydrate within the material. Research conducted at Lancaster University created a nanocomposite concrete by combining Curran with Portland cement. Their study found that concrete reinforced with Curran could be made with lower quantities of cement, thereby significantly reducing carbon emissions associated with cement production. Curran also made concrete more resistant to corrosion over time, as it increased the density of its microstructure. As of 2019, the Lancaster University research team, led by Mohamed Saafi, planned to conduct trials of Curran-enforced concrete in the United Kingdom by the end of 2020. The European Union's Horizon 2020 programme awarded £195,000 in funding to Saafi's team to continue their research.

=== Packaging ===
Nanocellulose can be used to manufacture biodegradeable packaging for the food industry, including paper and cardboard. In 2022, Cellucomp and the Danish Technological Institute partnered to produce sustainable paper-based food packaging based on Curran as an alternative to plastic.

=== Automotive and aerospace industry ===
In 2009, Curran was used to create part of the steering wheel of Worldfirst, a Formula Three automobile made entirely out of recycled and renewable materials. Researchers at University of Warwick engineered the vehicle. It was test driven by professional driver Aaron Steele at Brands Hatch.

== See also ==
- Biotechnology in the United Kingdom
