= Curren Bouquetd'or =

Japanese Thoroughbred racehorse (foaled 2016)

Curren Bouquetd'or カレンブーケドール
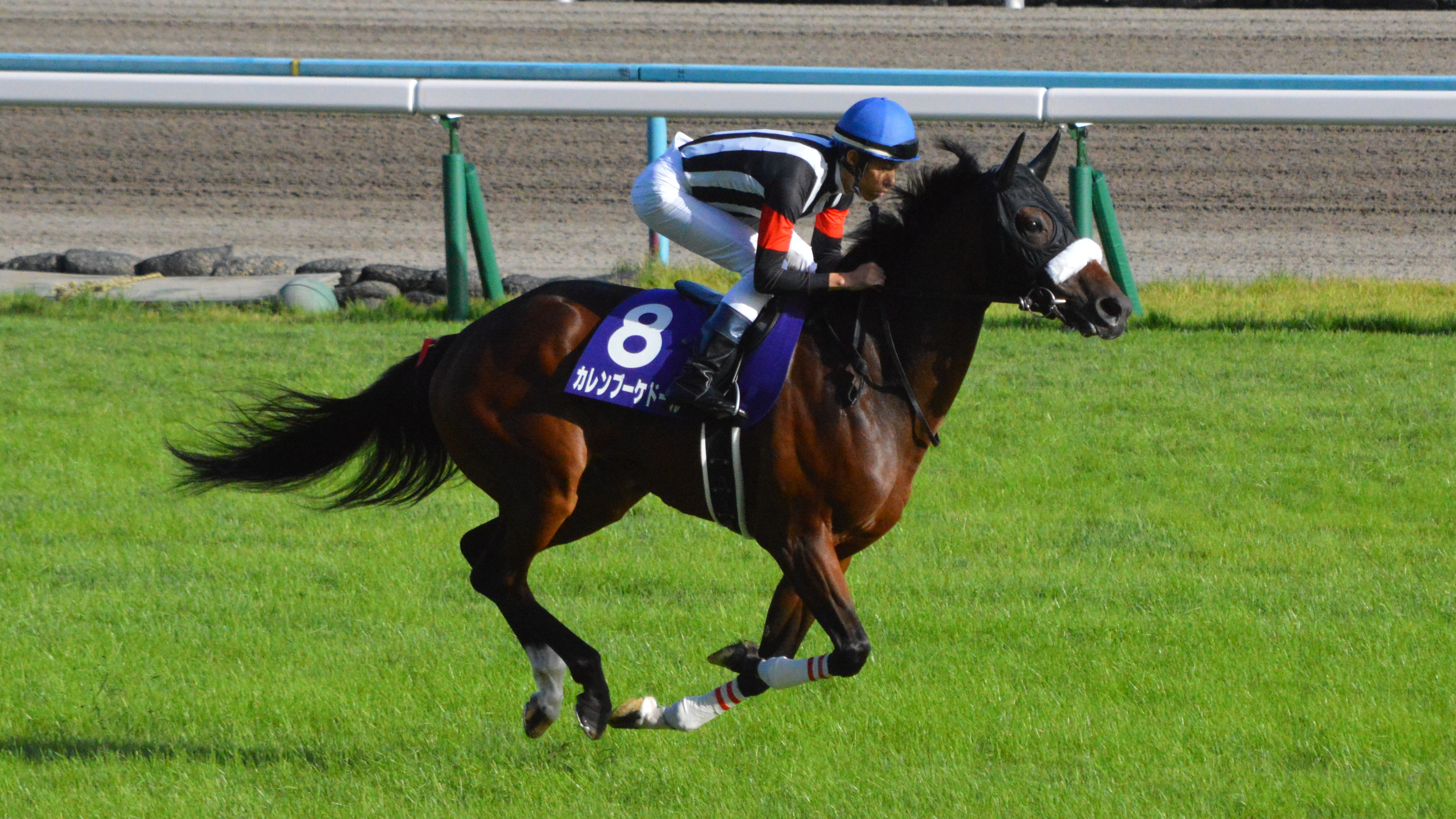
- Curren Bouquetd'or at the 2019 Shūka Shō.
- Breed: Thoroughbred
- Sire: Deep Impact (JPN)
- Grandsire: Sunday Silence (USA)
- Dam: Solaria (CHI)
- Damsire: Scat Daddy (USA)
- Sex: Mare
- Foaled: April 23, 2016 (age 10)
- Country: Japan
- Colour: Bay
- Breeder: Shadai Farm
- Owner: Takashi Suzuki
- Racing colours
- Trainer: Sakae Kunieda
- Jockey: Hiroshi Kitamura; Oisin Murphy; Keita Tosaki; Akihide Tsumura
- Record: 17: 2-7-3
- Earnings: ¥458,057,000

Curren Bouquetd'or (Japanese: カレンブーケドール, Hepburn: Karen Būkedōru; foaled 23 April 2016) is a retired Japanese Thoroughbred racehorse and active broodmare. She competed from 2018 to 2021, recording two wins in seventeen starts, including the Listed Sweet Pea Stakes in 2019. Despite never winning a graded stakes race, she placed second in six Grade 1 and Grade 2 races, including the Yushun Himba, Shūka Shō, and Japan Cup in 2019, earning her the moniker of a "silver collector" in Japanese racing media.

== Background ==
Curren Bouquetd'or is a bay mare bred in Chitose, Hokkaido, by Shadai Farm. She was sired by the Japanese Triple Crown winner Deep Impact, and her dam is Solaria, a Chilean-bred mare who won multiple Group 1 races in Chile, including the Chilean 1000 Guineas and El Derby. She was owned by Takashi Suzuki, who uses the "Curren" prefix for his horses, and sent into training with Sakae Kunieda at the JRA's Miho Training Center.

== Racing career ==
=== 2018: Two-year-old season ===
Curren Bouquetd'or debuted on October 8, 2018, in a maiden race on the turf at Tokyo Racecourse, finishing second to Danon Kingley. She finished third in a subsequent maiden race at Tokyo in November. On December 16, she recorded her first victory in a maiden race at Nakayama Racecourse, ridden by Oisin Murphy.

=== 2019: Three-year-old season ===
Curren Bouquetd'or began her 2019 campaign by finishing fourth in the Queen Cup (GIII) at Tokyo. On April 28, she won the Sweet Pea Stakes (Listed) at Tokyo. She subsequently contested the Yushun Himba (Japanese Oaks, GI) on May 19, finishing second by a nose to Loves Only You in a race where the top three finishers all recorded the same official time.

In the autumn, she finished third in the Shion Sho (GIII) and second in the Shuka Sho (GI) behind Chrono Genesis. On November 24, she entered the Japan Cup (GI) at Tokyo. Ridden by Akihide Tsumura, she finished second, losing by 0.1 seconds to Suave Richard.

=== 2020: Four-year-old season ===
In 2020, Curren Bouquetd'or finished second in the Kyoto Kinen (GII) behind Chrono Genesis. She was scheduled to travel to the United Arab Emirates for the Dubai Sheema Classic, but the race was cancelled due to the COVID-19 pandemic. Returning to Japan, she finished second in the All Comers (GII) at Nakayama in September, losing by a nose to Centelleo. She later finished fourth in the Japan Cup and fifth in the Arima Kinen (GI).

=== 2021: Five-year-old season ===
Curren Bouquetd'or finished second in the Nikkei Sho (GII) in March and third in the Tenno Sho (Spring, GI) in May. She finished fourth in the Takarazuka Kinen (GI) in June.

In her final start on October 31, she finished twelfth in the Tenno Sho (Autumn, GI) at Tokyo. Following the race, it was discovered that she had developed suspensory ligament desmitis in her left foreleg. She was officially retired from racing on November 30, 2021.

== Statistics ==
The following table details all 17 starts of Curren Bouquetd'or's racing career based on official netkeiba and JBIS records.

Date	Distance (Condition)	Race	Class	Course	Odds (Favourite)	Field	Finish	Time	Winning (Losing) Margin	Winner (2nd Place)	Jockey	Ref
2018 – two-year-old season
Oct 8	Turf 1800 m (Firm)	2-Y-O Newcomer	Maiden	Tokyo	6.1 (3rd)	18	2nd	1:37.5	0.0	Danon Kingly	Hiroshi Kitamura	
Nov 18	Turf 1800 m (Firm)	2-Y-O Maiden	Maiden	Tokyo	1.7 (1st)	16	3rd	1:50.4	0.6	Krasavitsa	Hiroshi Kitamura	
Dec 16	Turf 1600 m (Firm)	2-Y-O Maiden	Maiden	Nakayama	1.8 (1st)	16	1st	1:35.5	0.0	(Sing for You)	Oisin Murphy	
2019 – three-year-old season
Feb 11	Turf 1600 m (Firm)	Queen Cup	GIII	Tokyo	8.5 (4th)	9	4th	1:34.4	0.2	Chrono Genesis	Keita Tosaki	
Apr 28	Turf 1800 m (Firm)	Sweet Pea Stakes	Listed	Tokyo	5.1 (2nd)	12	1st	1:47.7	0.0	(Sing for You)	Akihide Tsumura	
May 19	Turf 2400 m (Firm)	Yushun Himba	GI	Tokyo	94.1 (12th)	18	2nd	2:22.8	0.0	Loves Only You	Akihide Tsumura	
Sep 7	Turf 2000 m (Firm)	Shion Stakes	GIII	Nakayama	2.8 (1st)	15	3rd	1:58.4	0.1	Passing Through	Akihide Tsumura	
Oct 13	Turf 2000 m (Good)	Shuka Sho	GI	Kyoto	5.6 (2nd)	17	2nd	2:00.2	0.3	Chrono Genesis	Akihide Tsumura	
Nov 24	Turf 2400 m (Firm)	Japan Cup	GI	Tokyo	10.5 (5th)	15	2nd	2:26.0	0.1	Suave Richard	Akihide Tsumura	
2020 – four-year-old season
Feb 16	Turf 2200 m (Soft)	Kyoto Kinen	GII	Kyoto	2.8 (2nd)	9	2nd	2:16.8	0.4	Chrono Genesis	Akihide Tsumura	
Sep 27	Turf 2200 m (Good)	Sankei Sho All Comers	GII	Nakayama	3.7 (2nd)	9	2nd	2:15.5	0.0	Centelleo	Akihide Tsumura	
Nov 29	Turf 2400 m (Firm)	Japan Cup	GI	Tokyo	24.9 (5th)	15	4th	2:23.2	0.2	Almond Eye	Akihide Tsumura	
Dec 27	Turf 2500 m (Firm)	Arima Kinen	GI	Nakayama	7.9 (3rd)	16	5th	2:35.6	0.6	Chrono Genesis	Kenichi Ikezoe	
2021 – five-year-old season
Mar 27	Turf 2500 m (Firm)	Nikkei Sho	GII	Nakayama	2.3 (1st)	15	2nd	2:33.4	0.1	Win Marilyn	Kohei Matsuyama	
May 2	Turf 3200 m (Firm)	Tenno Sho (Spring)	GI	Hanshin	7.3 (4th)	17	3rd	3:15.2	0.5	World Premiere	Keita Tosaki	
Jun 27	Turf 2200 m (Firm)	Takarazuka Kinen	GI	Hanshin	6.7 (3rd)	13	4th	2:11.7	0.8	Chrono Genesis	Keita Tosaki	
Oct 31	Turf 2000 m (Firm)	Tenno Sho (Autumn)	GI	Tokyo	19.6 (4th)	16	12th	1:59.2	1.3	Efforia	Keita Tosaki	

== In popular culture ==
An anthropomorphized version of Curren Bouquetd'or appears as a character in the Japanese multimedia franchise Umamusume: Pretty Derby, voiced by Anju Oda. She is depicted as a demure girl and a member of Tracen Academy's gardening club who is gentle, empathetic, and considerate to the point where she is often subservient to the needs of others above her own. She enjoys tending to flowers and creating extravagant arrangements, but also has a determined and hardworking side of her personality that manifests from feeling underestimated compared to her more talented rivals from her generation, and wishes to someday attain a prestigious racing career.

== Broodmare career ==
Following her retirement, Curren Bouquetd'or returned to Shadai Farm to become a broodmare.

c = colt, f = filly

No.	Name	Year	Sex	Color	Sire	Wins	Races	Remarks
1st	Ham Tan	2023	c	Bay	Epiphaneia	1	4	Active
2nd	Sunlit Bouquet	2024	f	Dark Bay	Bricks and Mortar			Pre-debut
3rd	(Curren Bouquetd'or 2025)	2025	f	Bay	Epiphaneia			
	(not foaled)	2026			Epiphaneia			

== Pedigree ==
Pedigree of Curren Bouquetd'or (JPN)
Sire Deep Impact (JPN) 2002	Sunday Silence (USA); 1986	Halo	Hail to Reason
Sire Deep Impact (JPN) 2002	Sunday Silence (USA); 1986	Halo	Cosmah
Sire Deep Impact (JPN) 2002	Sunday Silence (USA); 1986	Wishing Well	Understanding
Sire Deep Impact (JPN) 2002	Sunday Silence (USA); 1986	Wishing Well	Mountain Flower
Sire Deep Impact (JPN) 2002	Wind in Her Hair (IRE); 1991	Alzao	Lyphard
Sire Deep Impact (JPN) 2002	Wind in Her Hair (IRE); 1991	Alzao	Lady Rebecca
Sire Deep Impact (JPN) 2002	Wind in Her Hair (IRE); 1991	Burghclere	Busted
Sire Deep Impact (JPN) 2002	Wind in Her Hair (IRE); 1991	Burghclere	Highclere
Dam Solaria (CHI) 2010	Scat Daddy (USA); 2004	Johannesburg	Hennessy
Dam Solaria (CHI) 2010	Scat Daddy (USA); 2004	Johannesburg	Myth
Dam Solaria (CHI) 2010	Scat Daddy (USA); 2004	Love Style	Mr. Prospector
Dam Solaria (CHI) 2010	Scat Daddy (USA); 2004	Love Style	Likeable Style
Dam Solaria (CHI) 2010	So Linda (USA); 1999	Seeker's Reward	Gone West
Dam Solaria (CHI) 2010	So Linda (USA); 1999	Seeker's Reward	Willamar
Dam Solaria (CHI) 2010	So Linda (USA); 1999	So Posh	Liloy
Dam Solaria (CHI) 2010	So Linda (USA); 1999	So Posh	Osadia

- Curren Bouquetd'or is inbred 4 × 5 to Mr. Prospector.

== See also ==
- Thoroughbred racing in Japan
- Japan Cup
