= Curren (name) =

Curren may refer to the following people:

Given name

- Curren Caples (born 1996), American skateboarder
- Curren Price (born 1950), American politician

Surname

- Kevin Curren (born 1958), South African-American tennis player
- L. Murray Curren (1873–1945), Canadian politician
- Red Curren (1925–2010), Canadian basketball player
- Reg Curren (1914–1996), Australian politician
- Tom Curren (born 1964), American surfer
- Tom Curren (footballer) (born 1992), Australian rules footballer

== See also ==
- Curren
- Curran (surname)
