= Epiphaneia (horse) =

Japanese-bred Thoroughbred racehorse

Epiphaneia エピファネイア
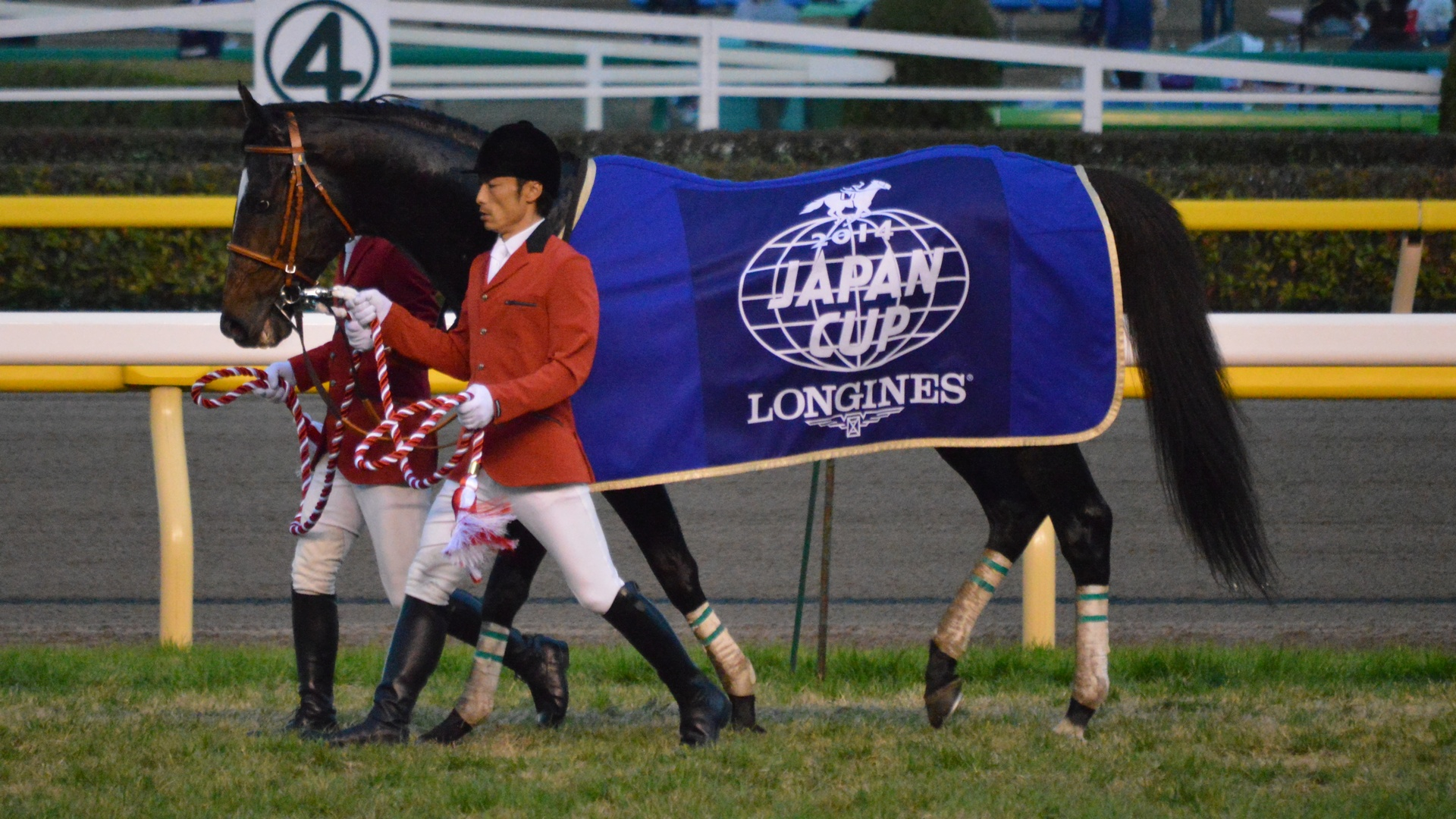
- Epiphaneia after winning the 2014 Japan Cup.
- Breed: Thoroughbred
- Sire: Symboli Kris S (USA)
- Grandsire: Kris S (USA)
- Dam: Cesario (JPN)
- Damsire: Special Week (JPN)
- Sex: Stallion
- Foaled: February 11, 2010 (age 16)
- Country: Japan
- Colour: Bay
- Breeder: Northern Farm
- Owner: U Carrott Farm
- Racing colours
- Trainer: Katsuhiko Sumii
- Jockey: Yuichi Fukunaga; Christophe Soumillon
- Record: 14: 6-2-1
- Earnings: ¥687,795,000; US$6,107,619.6

Major wins
- Radio Nikkei Hai Nisai Stakes (2012); Kobe Shimbun Hai (2013); Japan Cup (2014); Japanese Classic Race wins: Kikuka Sho (2013)

Awards
- World's top-rated long distance horse (2014); Timeform rating: 132

Epiphaneia (Japanese: エピファネイア, Hepburn: Epifaneia; foaled February 11, 2010) is a retired Japanese Thoroughbred racehorse and active breeding stallion. In 2012, he was unbeaten in three races including the Grade III Radio Nikkei Hai Nisai Stakes. In the following year, he finished second in both the Satsuki Shō and the Tōkyō Yūshun before winning the Kobe Shimbun Hai and the Kikuka-shō. He recorded his biggest success in 2014 when winning the Japan Cup.

== Background ==
Epiphaneia is a bay horse with a white star bred in Japan by Northern Farm. He was sired by Symboli Kris S, an American-bred stallion who was twice voted Japanese Horse of the Year. As a stud, he has sired several other major winners including Strong Return (Yasuda Kinen), Success Brocken (February Stakes) and Alfredo (Asahi Hai Futurity Stakes). Epiphaneia's dam Cesario was an outstanding racemare who won the Yushun Himba and the American Oaks and was voted the JRA Award for Best Three-Year-Old Filly in 2005. Her other foals have included Saturnalia and Leontes. As a descendant of The Oaks winner Pia, Cesario was related to other major winners, including Chief Singer and Pleasantly Perfect.

During his racing career, Epiphaneia was owned by U Carrott Farm and trained by Katsuhiko Sumii. He has been ridden in most of his races by Yuichi Fukunaga.

== Racing career ==
=== 2012: two-year-old season ===
Epiphaneia was undefeated in three starts as a two-year-old in 2012. He made his racecourse debut in a maiden race over 1800 metres at Kyoto Racecourse on 21 October and won from Red Giselle. At the same course in November, he won the Listed Kyoto Nisai Stakes over 2000 metres, beating Dantsu Atlas. In December, he was moved up in class for the Grade III Radio Nikkei Hai Nisai Stakes at Hanshin Racecourse. Starting the 0.9/1 favourite, he won by half a length from Bad Boy, with Kizuna a neck away in third.

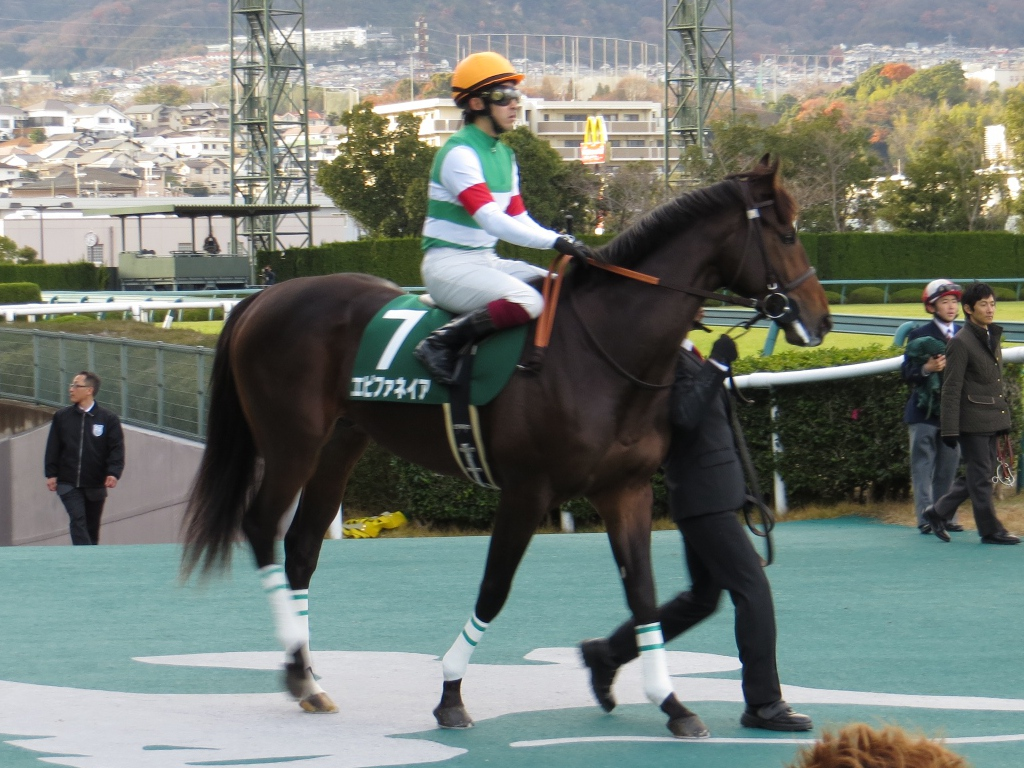
Radio Nikkei Hai Nisai Stakes

=== 2013: three-year-old season ===
Epiphaneia made his three-year-old debut in the Grade II Hochi Hai Yayoi Sho over 2000 metres at Nakayama Racecourse in which he was ridden for the first and only time by William Buick. He started the 1.3/1 favourite and finished fourth in a blanket finish behind Camino Tassajara, Miyaji Taiga, and Codino, with Kizuna in fifth. On 14 April, over the same course and distance, the colt started the 2.9/1 second favourite for the Grade I Satsuki Sho and finished second of the eighteen runners, beaten half a length by the favourite Logotype. Epiphaneia was then moved up in distance for the Tokyo Yushun over 2400 metres at Tokyo Racecourse on 26 May. Starting at odds of 5.1/1 in an eighteen runner-field he finished second again, beaten half a length by Kizuna, with Apollo Sonic, Peptide Amazon, and Logotype in third, fourth and fifth.

After the summer break, Epiphaneia returned in the Grade II Kobe Shimbun Hai (a trial race for the Kikuka Sho) over 2400 metres at Hanshin on 22 September. He started the 2/5 favourite against seventeen opponents and won by two and a half lengths from Majesty Hearts. At Kyoto on 20 October, Epiphaneia started 3/5 favourite for the Kikuka Sho over 3000 metres. He tracked the pace-setters Bande and Neko Taisho before taking the lead 400 metres from the finish and recorded his first Grade I success, beating Santono Noblesse by five lengths. After the race, Fukunaga told the Japan Times, "He ran a perfect race. He was so calm prior to the start that I was worried he might not leave the gate on time. But he started well, and we knew which two horses were going to set the pace so all I had to do was focus on settling him".

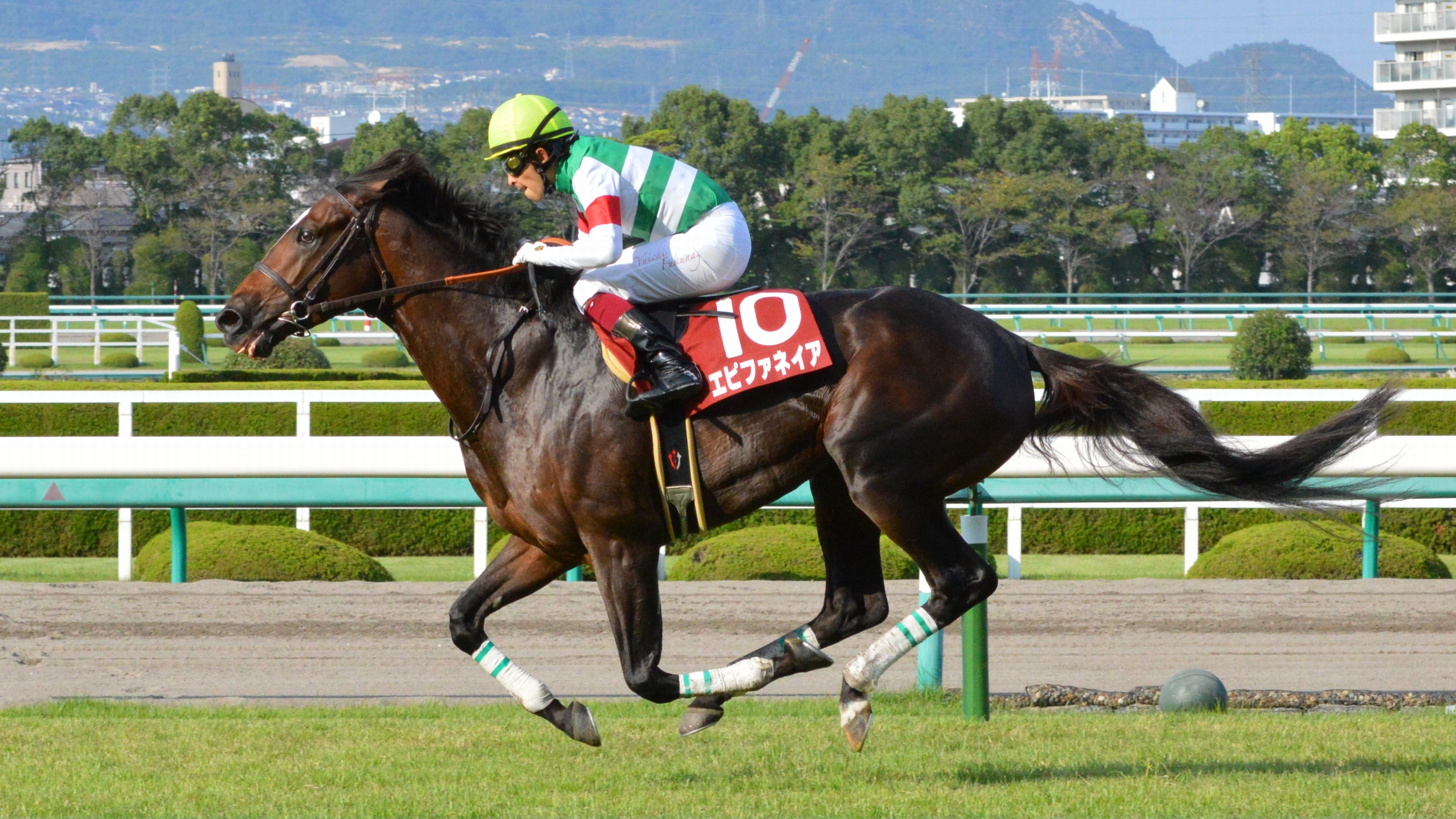
Kobe Shimbun Hai

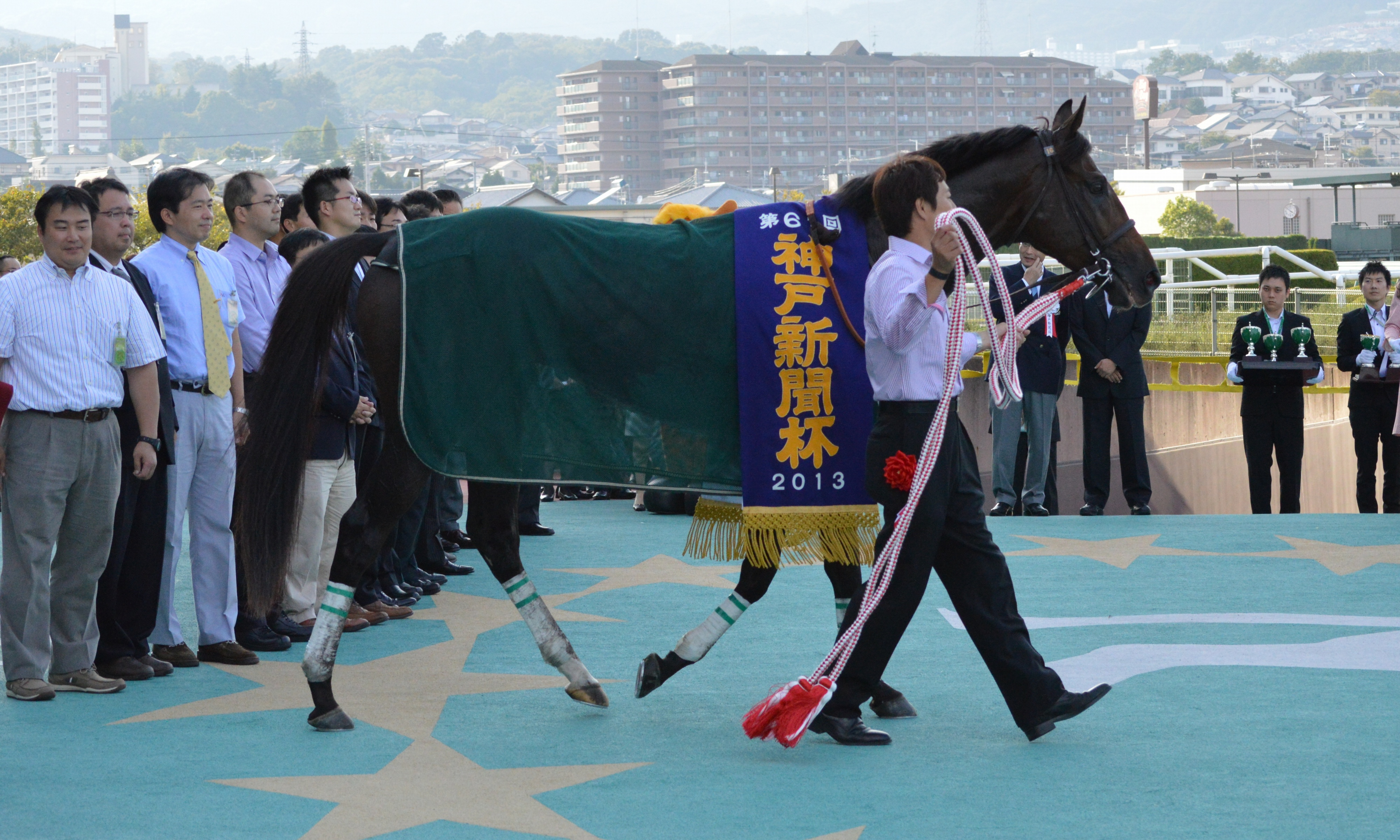
At the winner's circle after Kobe Shimbun Hai

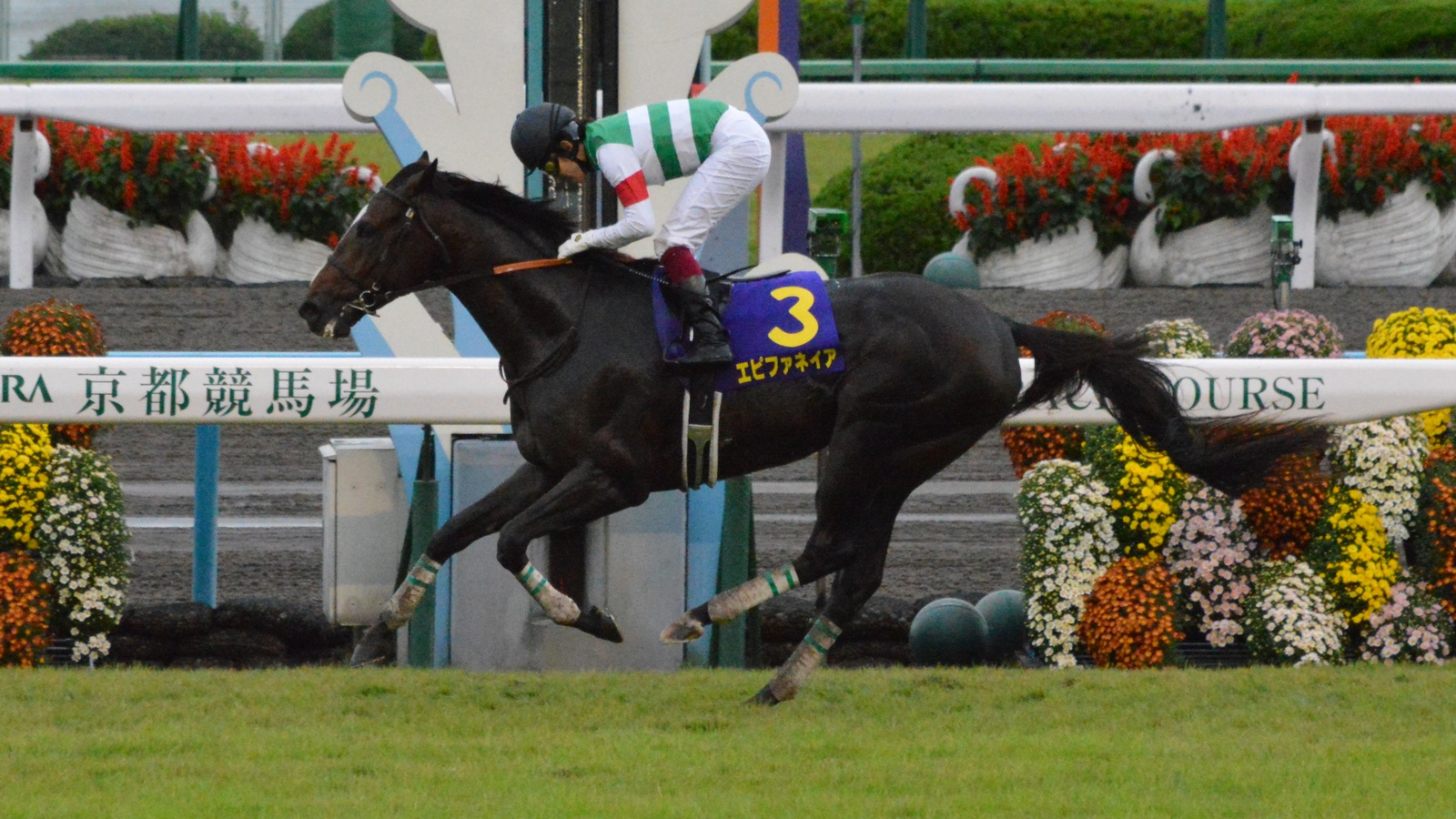
Winning the Kikuka-sho

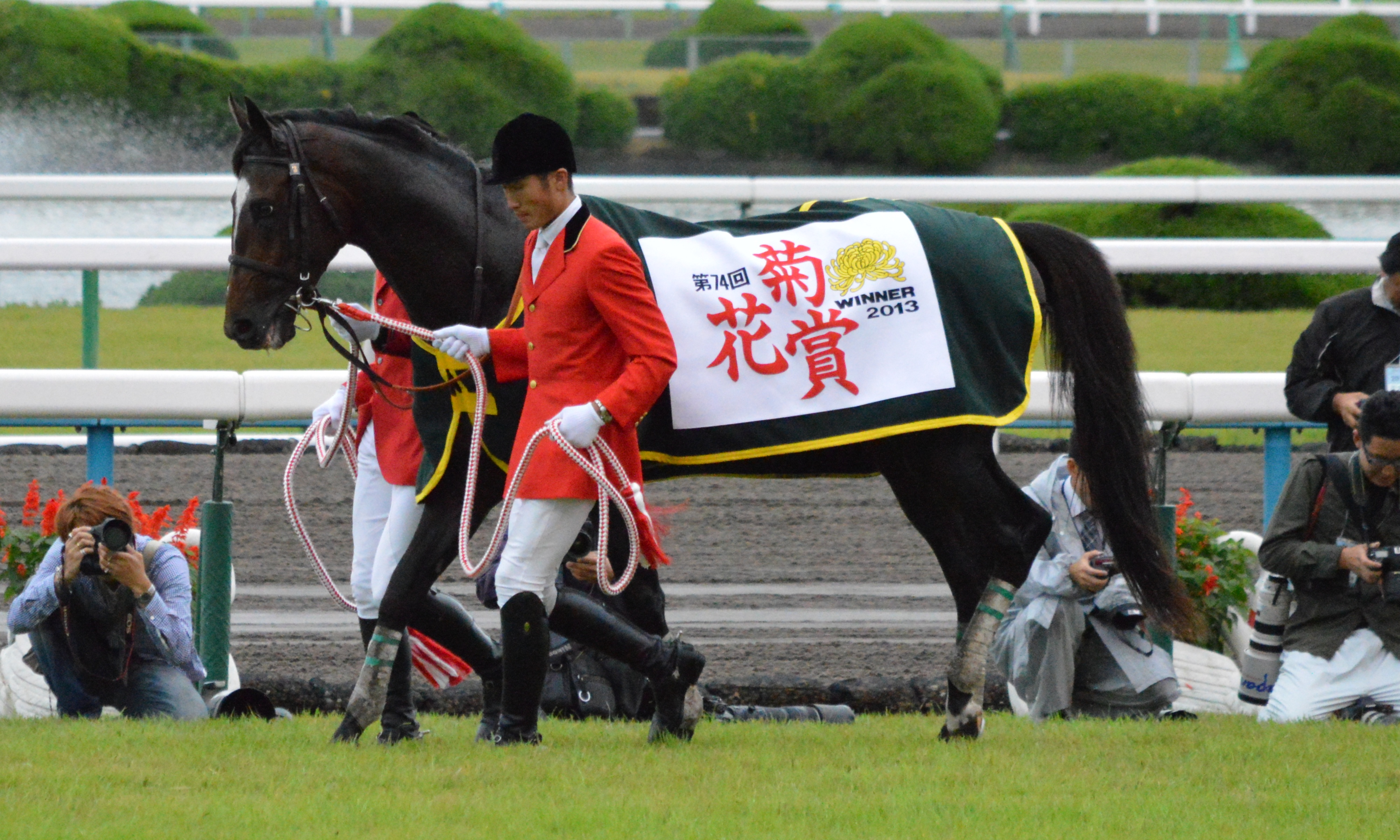
Wearing his winner's blanket after Kikuka-sho

=== 2014: four-year-old season ===
Epiphaneia began his third season in the Grade II Sankei Osaka Hai over 2000 metres at Hanshin on 6 April. He started the 9/10 favourite and finished third of the eight runners behind Kizuna and Tokai Paradise. Later that month, the colt represented Japan in the Queen Elizabeth II Cup at Sha Tin Racecourse in Hong Kong. Starting at odds of 11/5, he finished fourth behind Designs On Rome, Military Attack and the South African challenger Vercingetorix.

On his first appearance of his autumn campaign, Epiphaneia contested the Tenno Sho over 2000 metres at Tokyo and finished sixth of the eighteen runners behind the five-year-old Spielberg. Christophe Soumillon took over the ride from Fukunaga when Epihaneia contested the 33rd running of the Japan Cup over 2400 metres in front of a crowd of 100,186 at Tokyo on 30 November. He started at odds of 7.9/1 in a field which included Trading Leather from Ireland, Ivanhowe from Germany, and Up With The Birds from Canada. The locally trained runners included Gentildonna, who was attempting to win the race for an unprecedented third time, Just A Way, Harp Star, and Spielberg. Epiphaneia tracked the leader, Satono Shuren, before taking the lead 400 metres from the finish. He accelerated clear in the closing stages to win by four lengths in a time of 2:23.1 from Just A Way with Spielberg half a length away in third ahead of Gentildonna, Harp Star, and Ivanhowe. After the race, Soumillon said, "The horse was very keen and I can't say I was very confident when I saw how he started because I saw I wouldn't be able to ride him the way the trainer asked: in sixth or seventh position... [it was] an amazing performance". The Arima Kinen over 2500 metres at Nakayama Racecourse on 28 December attracted its customary strong field, and Epiphaneia started second in the betting behind Gold Ship, with the other contenders including Just A Way and Gentildonna. Epiphaneia tracked the early leader, Verxina, before taking the lead 400 metres from the finish but was outpaced in the closing stages and finished fifth behind Gentildonna, To The World, Gold Ship, and Just A Way in a blanket finish.

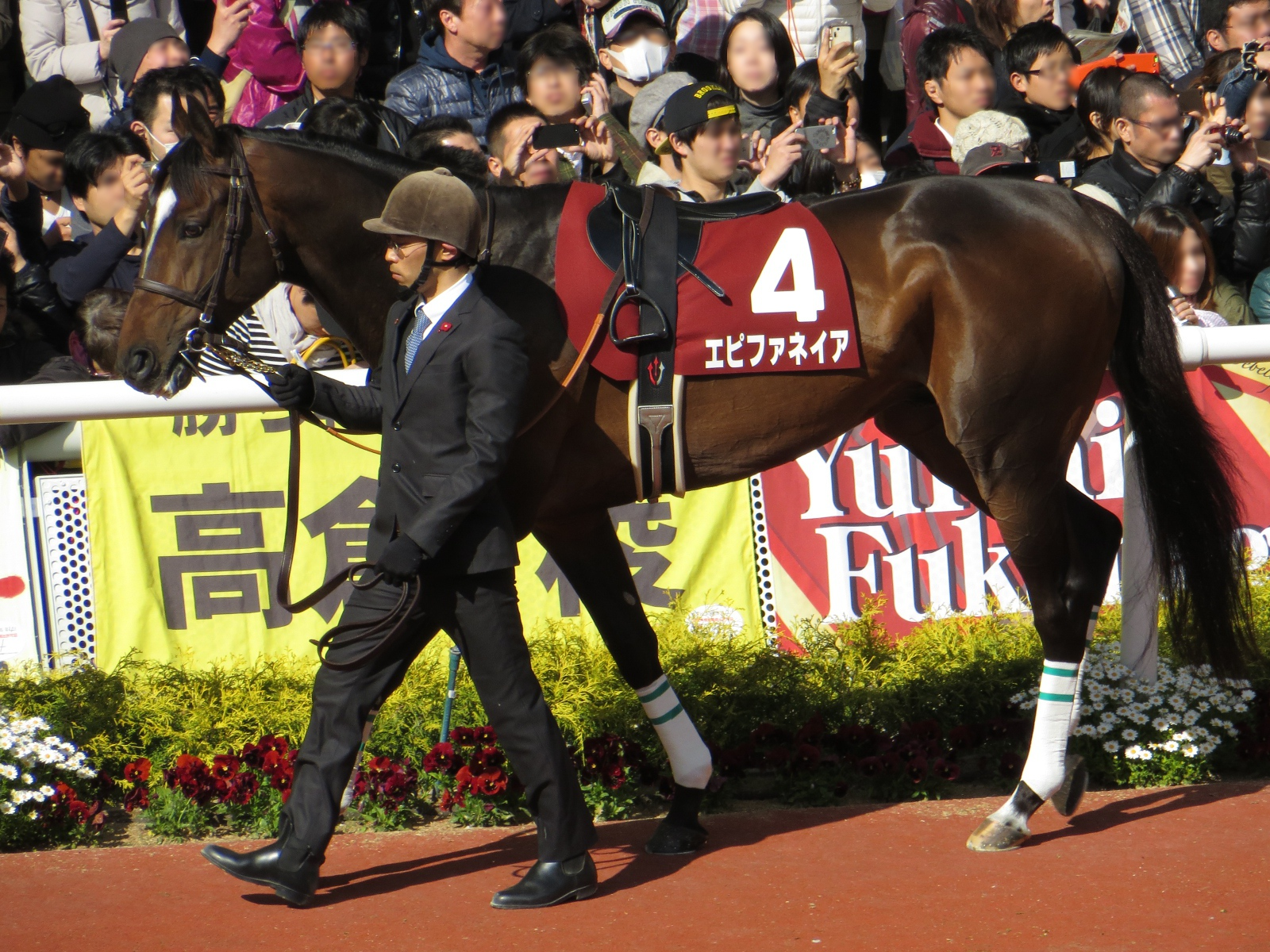
At the Osaka Hai paddock

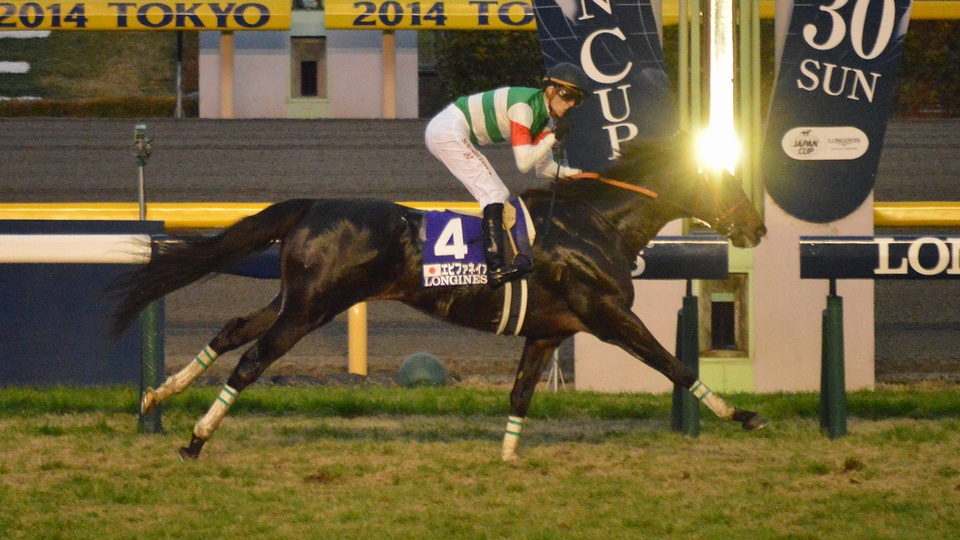
Winning the Japan Cup

=== 2015: five-year-old season ===
For his 2015 debut, Epiphaneia was sent to the United Arab Emirates to contest the Dubai World Cup in which he raced on dirt for the first time. He was never in contention, finishing last of the nine runners behind Prince Bishop. In late June, it was announced that the horse would face a lengthy absence from racing after sustaining a suspensory ligament injury. He did not return to the track and was retired from racing on July 30, 2015.

== Assessment and awards ==
In 2012, Epiphaneia finished second to Logotype in the voting for the JRA Award for Best Two-Year-Old Colt In the following year, he finished runner-up to Kizuna in the poll for JRA Award for Best Three-Year-Old Colt, taking 38 of the 280 votes. In the 2013 edition of the 2013 World's Best Racehorse Rankings, Epiphaneia was rated the 83rd best racehorse in the world and the 20th best three-year-old colt.

In the 2014 JRA Awards, Epiphaneia finished third to Gentildonna and Just A Way in the poll for the Japanese Horse of the Year and runner-up to Just A Way in the voting for the Best Older Male Horse

In the 2014 World's Best Racehorse Rankings, Epiphaneia was rated the second-best horse to race anywhere in the world in 2014 behind Just A Way and the best in the Long-distance division.

== Stud record ==
Epiphaneia began his stud career in 2016 at the Shadai Stallion Station. He sired the first undefeated Japanese Triple Tiara Daring Tact in his first crop of foals and Efforia, who went on to beat Gran Alegria, Contrail and Chrono Genesis in Tenno Sho (Autumn) and Arima Kinen respectively as a 3-year old colt, in his second crop. As of 2023 his stud service fee is ¥18,000,000.

=== Notable progeny ===
c = colt, f = filly, g = gelding

bold = G1 stakes

**Foaled**	**Name**	**Sex**	**Major Wins**
2017	Daring Tact	f	**Oka Sho**, **Yushun Himba**, **Shuka Sho**
2017	Aristoteles	c	American Jockey Club Cup
2017	Izu Jo no Kiseki	f	Fuchu Himba Stakes
2018	Efforia	c	**Satsuki Sho**, **Tenno Sho (Autumn)**, **Arima Kinen**
2018	Justin Cafe	c	Epsom Cup
2018	Ten Happy Rose	f	**Victoria Mile**
2019	Circle of Life	f	**Hanshin Juvenile Fillies**
2019	Blow the Horn	c	**Takarazuka Kinen**, Nikkei Shinshun Hai
2019	Epiphany	f	Kokura Daishoten
2019	Selburg	c	Chukyo Kinen
2020	Moryana	f	Shion Stakes
2021	Stellenbosch	f	**Oka Sho**
2021	Danon Decile	c	**Tōkyō Yūshun**, **Dubai Sheema Classic**, American Jockey Club Cup, Keisei Hai, **Tennō Shō (Autumn)**
2021	Byzantine Dream	c	Kisaragi Sho, Prix Foy, Red Sea Turf Handicap
2021	Ipheion	f	Fairy Stakes
2022	Erika Express	f	Fairy Stakes
2022	Yankee Barows	c	Falcon Stakes
2022	Jocelyn	f	Kokura Himba Stakes
2022	Giovanni	c	Challenge Cup
2023	Firostefani	f	Artemis Stakes
2023	Ghillies' Ball	f	Fillies' Revue
2023	Smart Priere	f	Flower Cup

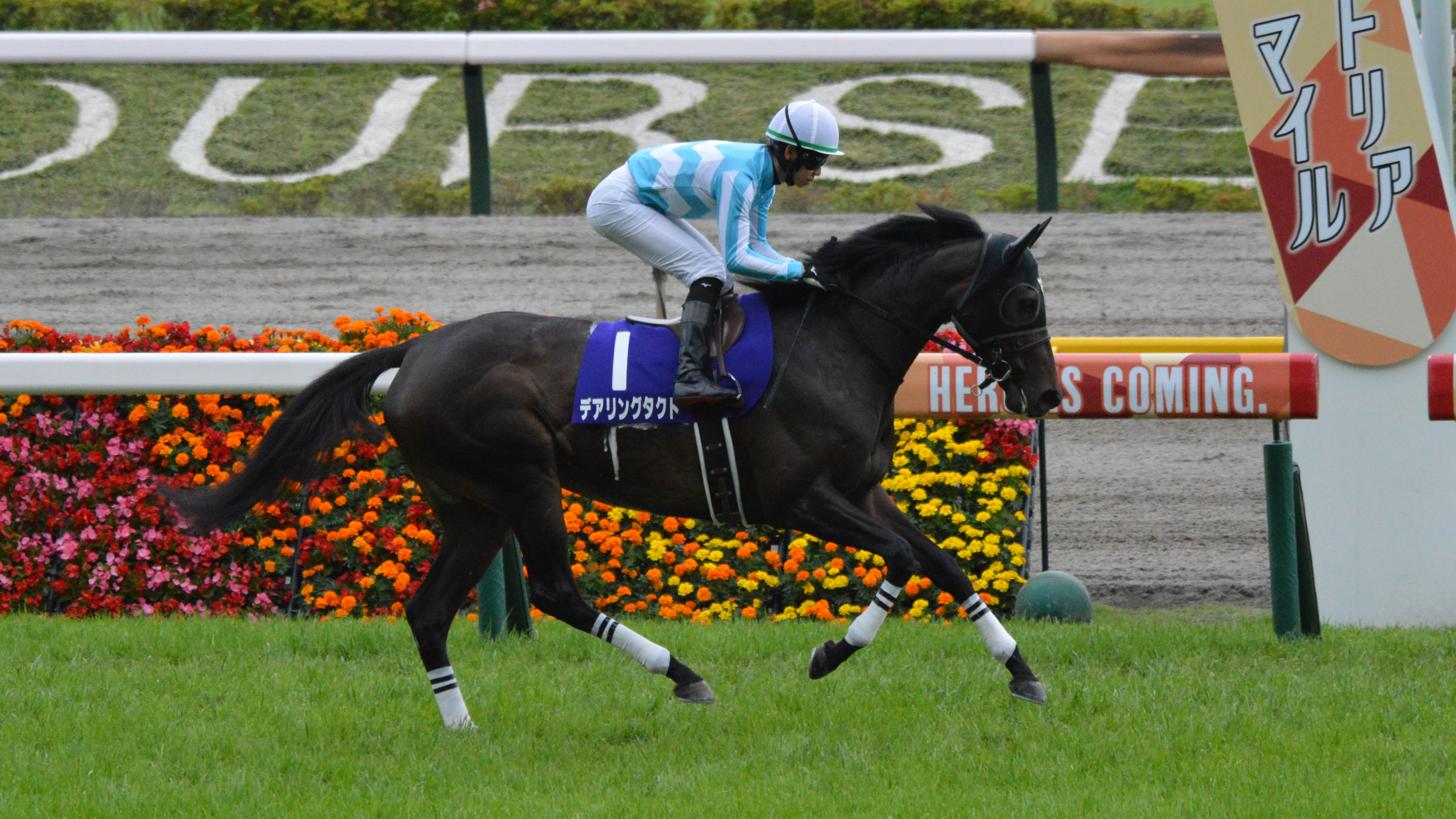
Daring Tact

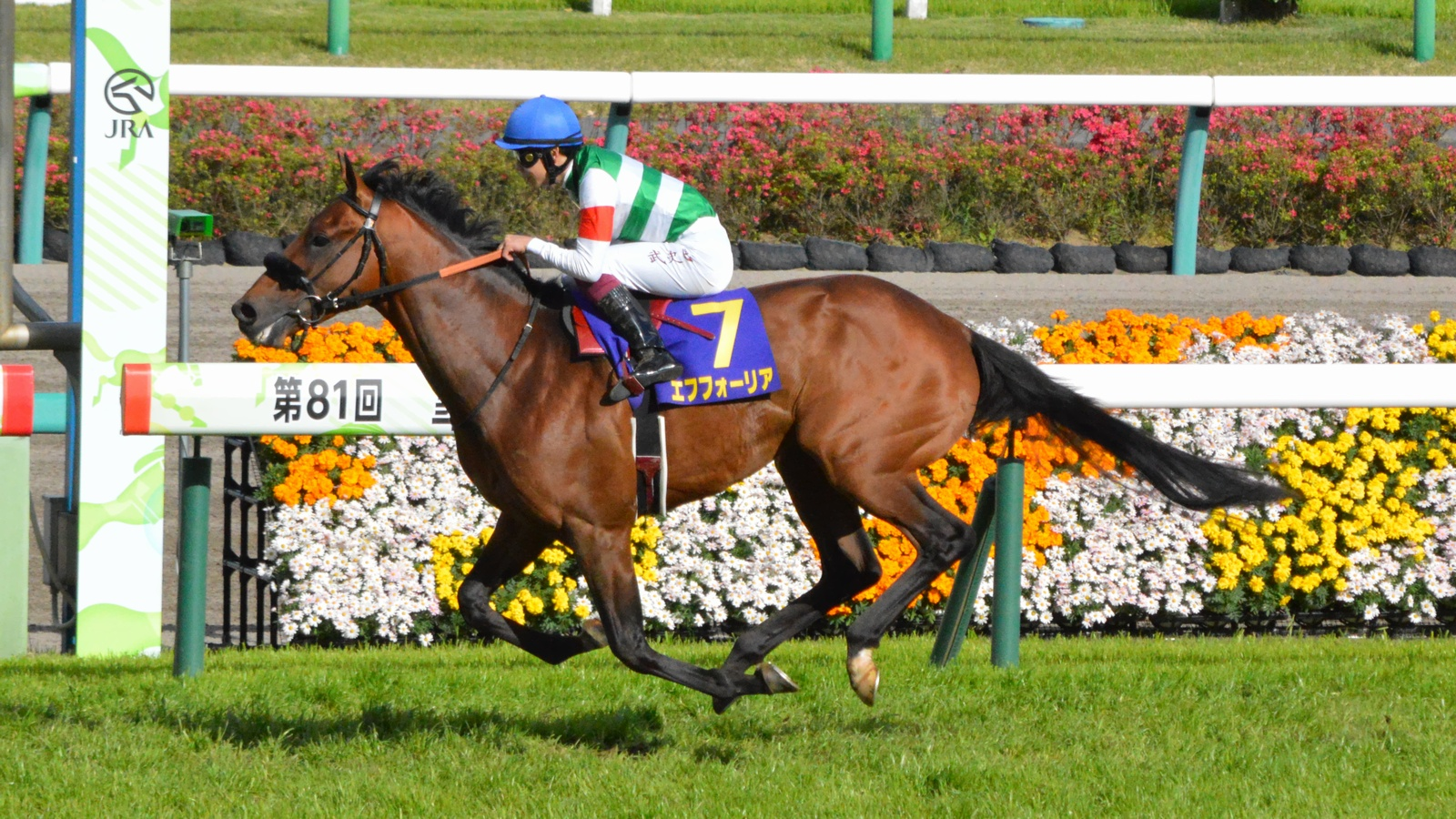
Efforia

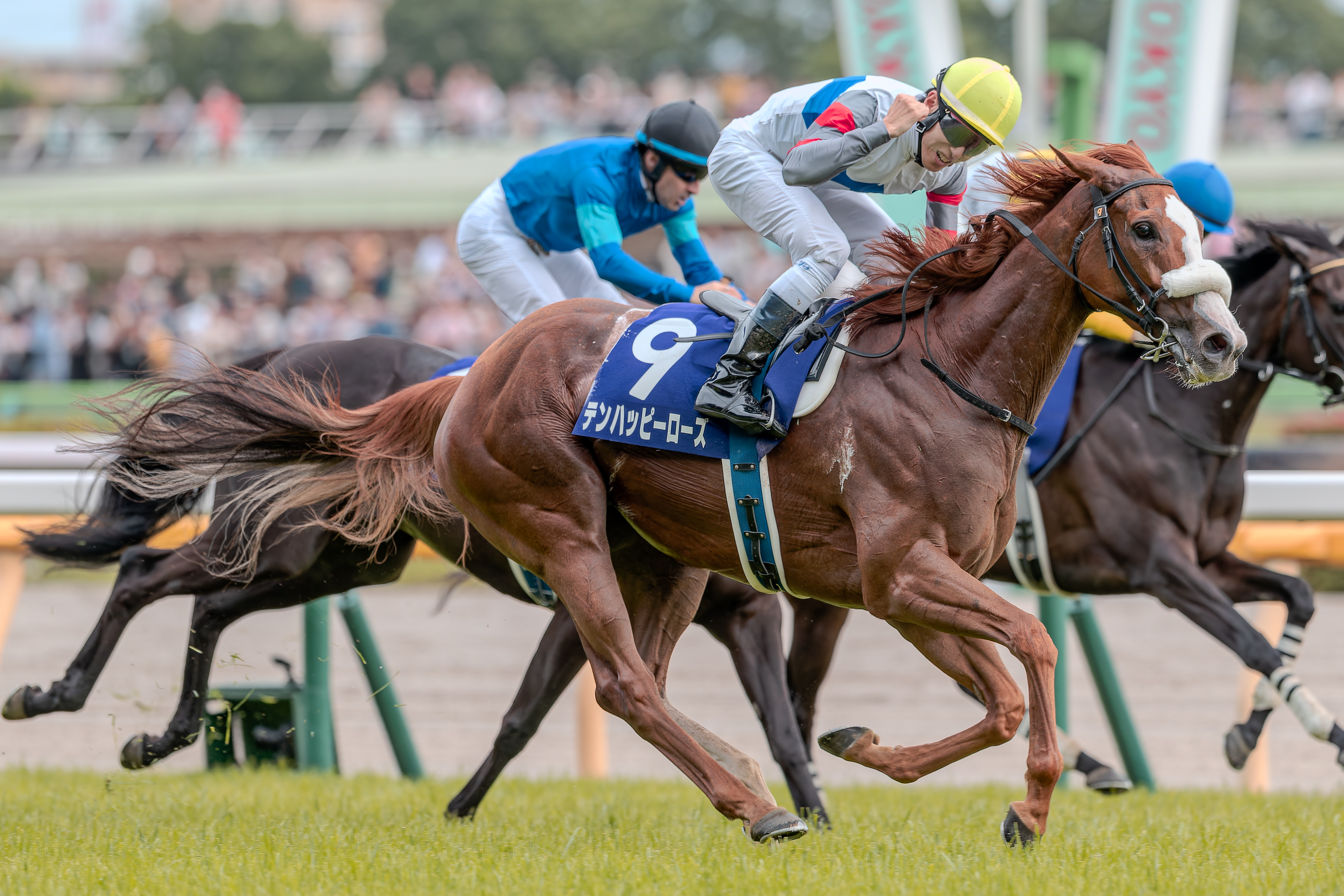
Ten Happy Rose

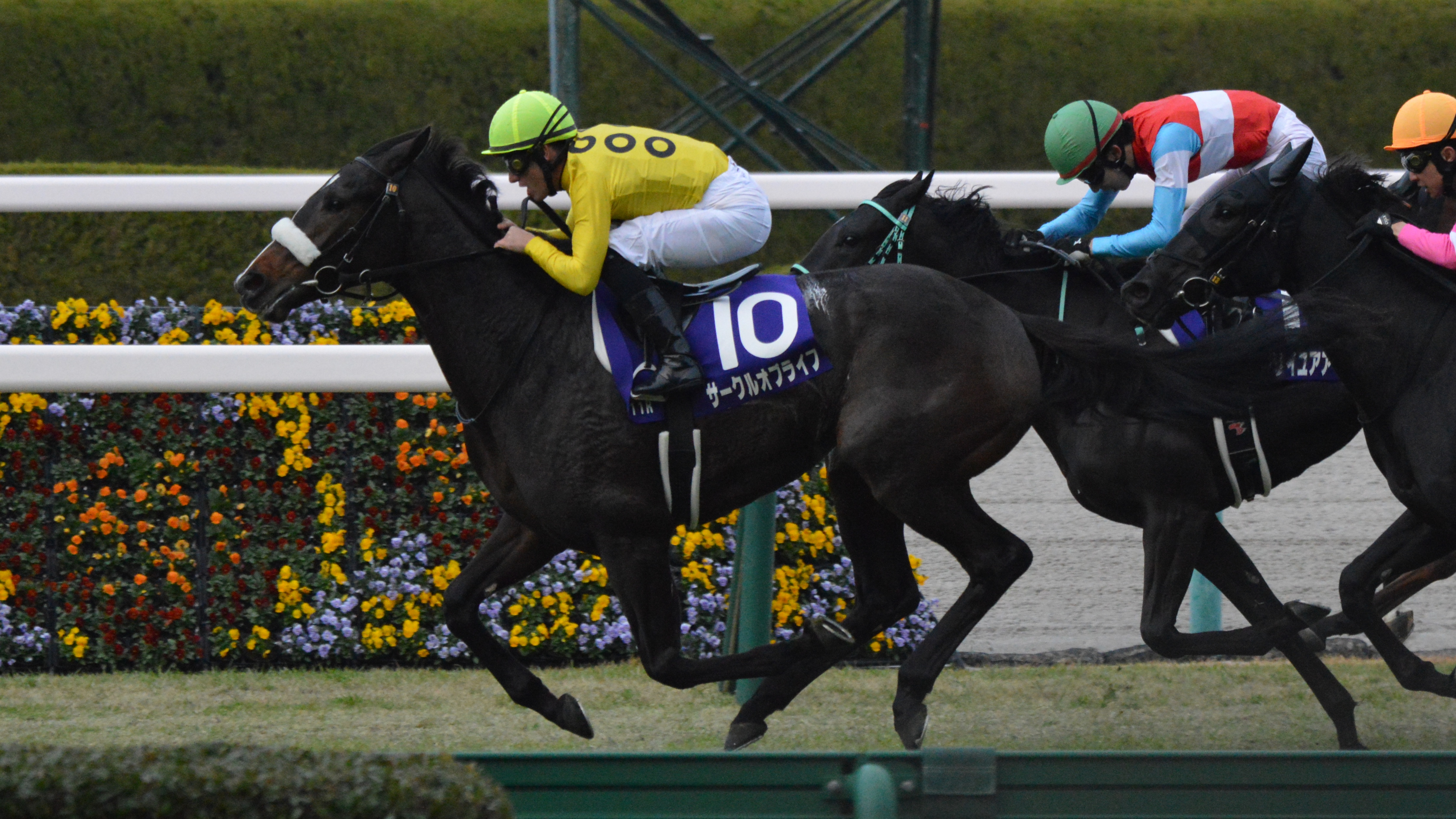
Circle of Life

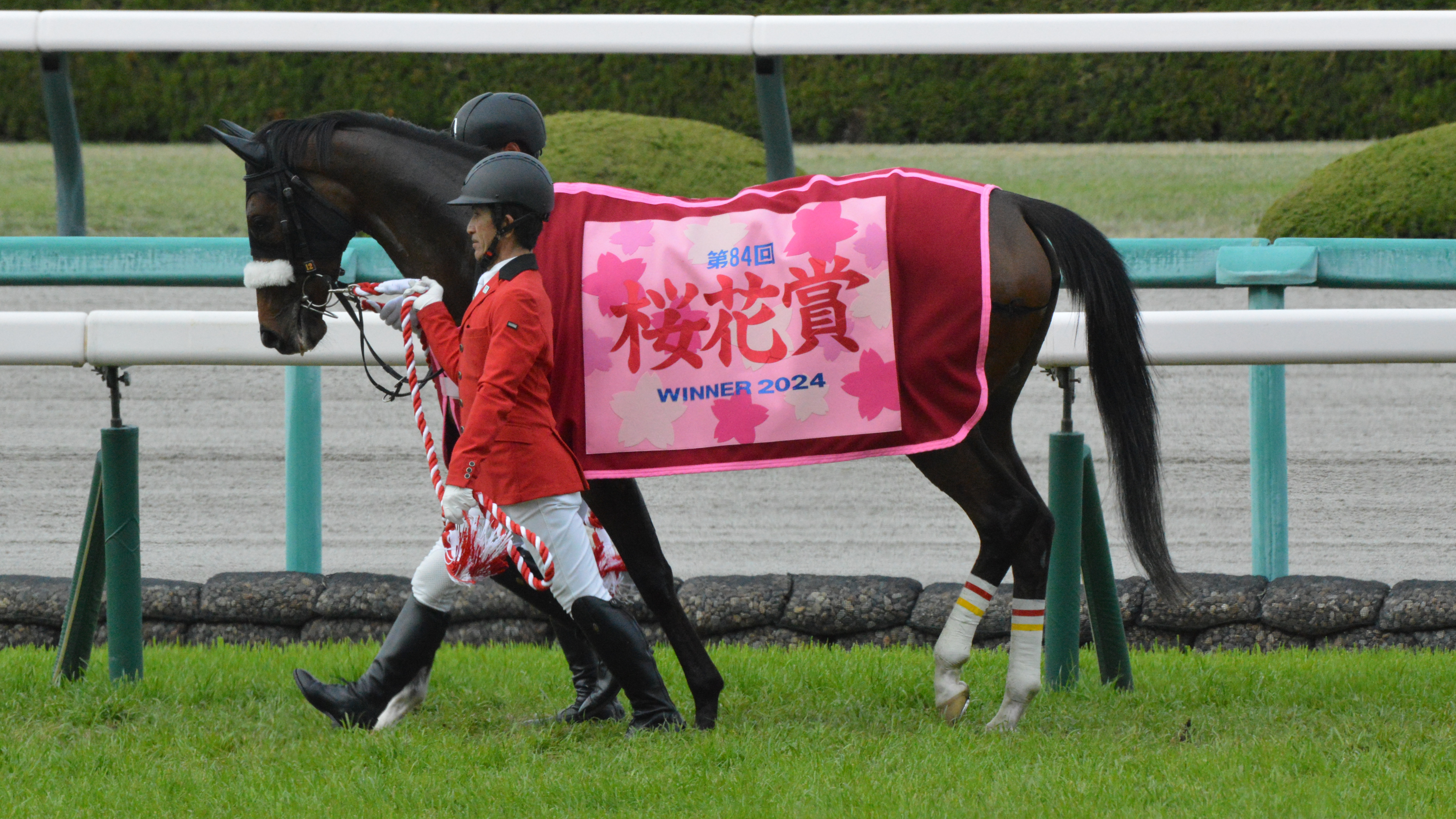
Stellenbosch

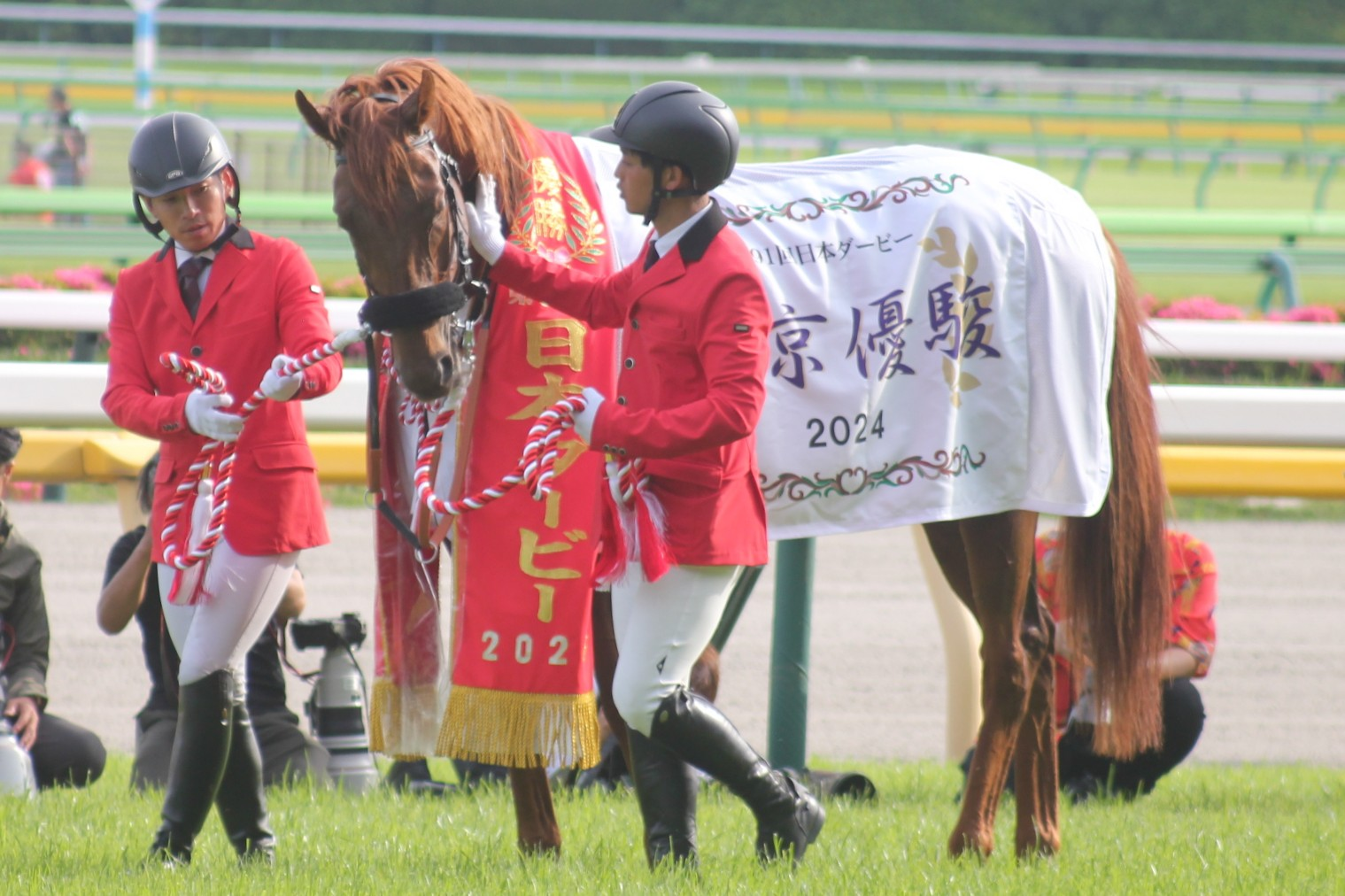
Danon Decile

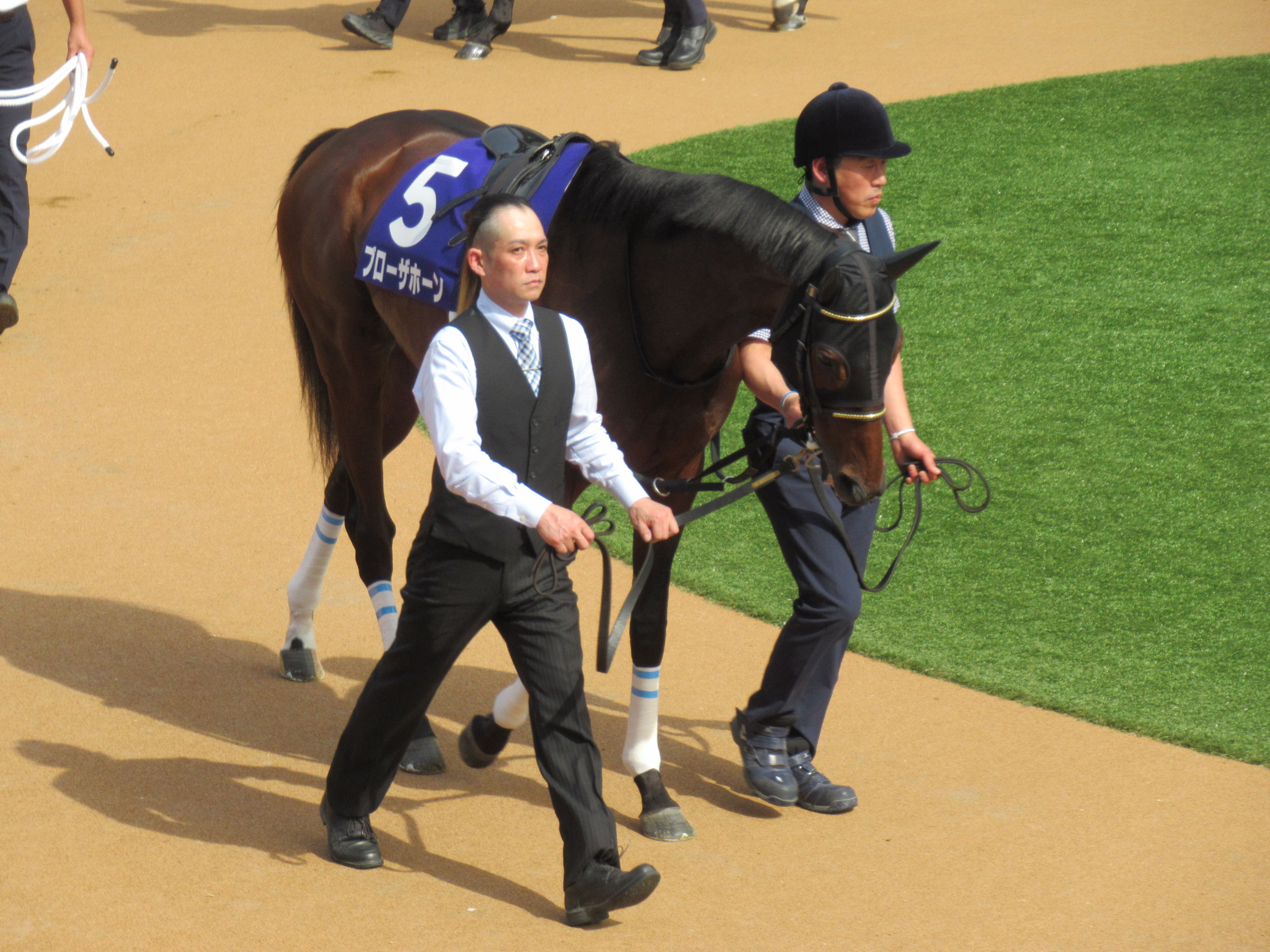
Blow the Horn

== In popular culture ==
An anthropomorphized version of Epiphaneia appears as a character in the Japanese multimedia franchise Umamusume: Pretty Derby, voiced by Hikari Senga. She is depicted as a highly eccentric and energetic girl who attributes her decision-making to following fate, which oftentimes lands her in risky and troublesome situations due to her stubbornness and overly enthusiastic attitude. She is the first character who has both her real-life sire, Symboli Kris S, and her real-life dam, Cesario, included as characters in the franchise, completing the first father-mother-child trio.

== Racing form ==
Epiphaneia won six races and struck podium in three out of 14 starts. This data is available based on JBIS, netkeiba, HKJC and racingpost.

Date	Age	Track	Race	Grade	Distance (Condition)	Entry	HN	Odds (Favored)	Finish	Time	Margins	Jockey	Winner (Runner-up)
Oct 21, 2012	2	Kyoto	2yo Newcomer		1,800 m (Firm)	14	2	2.9 (1)	1st	1:48.9	–0.5	Yuichi Fukunaga	(Red Giselle)
Nov 24, 2012	2	Kyoto	Kyoto Nisai Stakes	OP	2,000 m (Firm)	10	1	1.2 (1)	1st	2:03.0	–0.3	Yuichi Fukunaga	(Dantsu Atlas)
Dec 22, 2012	2	Hanshin	Radio Nikkei Hai Nisai Stakes	3	2,000 m (Good)	7	7	1.9 (1)	1st	2:05.4	–0.1	Yuichi Fukunaga	(Bad Boy)
Mar 3, 2013	3	Nakayama	Yayoi Sho	2	2,000 m (Firm)	12	12	2.3 (1)	4th	2:01.1	0.1	William Buick	Camino Tassajara
Apr 14, 2013	3	Nakayama	Satsuki Sho	1	2,000 m (Firm)	14	12	3.9 (2)	2nd	1:58.1	0.1	Yuichi Fukunaga	Logotype
May 26, 2013	3	Tokyo	Tokyo Yushun	1	2,400 m (Firm)	18	9	6.1 (3)	2nd	2:24.4	0.1	Yuichi Fukunaga	Kizuna
Sep 22, 2013	3	Hanshin	Kobe Shimbun Hai	2	2,400 m (Firm)	18	10	1.4 (1)	1st	2:24.8	–0.4	Yuichi Fukunaga	(Majesty Heart)
Oct 20, 2013	3	Kyoto	Kikuka Sho	1	3,000 m (Heavy)	18	3	1.6 (1)	1st	3:05.2	–0.8	Yuichi Fukunaga	(Satono Noblesse)
Apr 6, 2014	4	Hanshin	Sankei Osaka Hai	2	2,000 m (Firm)	8	4	1.9 (1)	3rd	2:00.6	0.3	Yuichi Fukunaga	Kizuna
Apr 27, 2014	4	Sha Tin	QEII Cup	1	2,000 m (Firm)	10	3	3.2 (2)	4th	2:01.8	0.7	Yuichi Fukunaga	Designs on Rome
Nov 2, 2014	4	Tokyo	Tenno Sho (Autumn)	1	2,000 m (Firm)	18	5	8.0 (4)	6th	1:59.9	0.2	Yuichi Fukunaga	Spielberg
Nov 30, 2014	4	Tokyo	Japan Cup	1	2,400 m (Firm)	18	4	8.9 (4)	1st	2:23.1	–0.7	Christophe Soumillon	(Just A Way)
Dec 28, 2014	4	Nakayama	Arima Kinen	1	2,500 m (Firm)	16	13	4.0 (2)	5th	2:35.5	0.2	Yuga Kawada	Gentildonna
Mar 28, 2015	5	Meydan	Dubai World Cup	1	2,000 m (Fast)	9	8	13/2 (3)	9th	2:11.8	8.6	Christophe Soumillon	Prince Bishop

Legend:
Turf Dirt

== Pedigree ==
Pedigree of Epiphaneia (JPN), bay colt, 2010
Sire Symboli Kris S (USA) 1999	Kris S (USA); 1977	Roberto	Hail To Reason
Sire Symboli Kris S (USA) 1999	Kris S (USA); 1977	Roberto	Bramalea
Sire Symboli Kris S (USA) 1999	Kris S (USA); 1977	Sharp Queen	Princequillo
Sire Symboli Kris S (USA) 1999	Kris S (USA); 1977	Sharp Queen	Bridgework
Sire Symboli Kris S (USA) 1999	Tee Kay (USA); 1991	Gold Meridian	Seattle Slew
Sire Symboli Kris S (USA) 1999	Tee Kay (USA); 1991	Gold Meridian	Queen Louie
Sire Symboli Kris S (USA) 1999	Tee Kay (USA); 1991	Tri Argo	Tri Jet
Sire Symboli Kris S (USA) 1999	Tee Kay (USA); 1991	Tri Argo	Hail Proudly
Dam Cesario (JPN) 2002	Special Week (JPN); 1995	Sunday Silence	Halo
Dam Cesario (JPN) 2002	Special Week (JPN); 1995	Sunday Silence	Wishing Well
Dam Cesario (JPN) 2002	Special Week (JPN); 1995	Campaign Girl	Maruzensky
Dam Cesario (JPN) 2002	Special Week (JPN); 1995	Campaign Girl	Lady Shiraoki
Dam Cesario (JPN) 2002	Kirov Premiere (GB); 1990	Sadler's Wells	Northern Dancer
Dam Cesario (JPN) 2002	Kirov Premiere (GB); 1990	Sadler's Wells	Fairy Bridge
Dam Cesario (JPN) 2002	Kirov Premiere (GB); 1990	Querida	Habitat
Dam Cesario (JPN) 2002	Kirov Premiere (GB); 1990	Querida	Principia (Family:16-a)
