= Curran (given name) =

Curran is a masculine given name which may refer to:

- Curran Oi (born 1990), American figure skater
- Curran Phillips (born 2000), American artistic gymnast
- Curran Walters (born 1998), American actor
