= Biotechnology in the United Kingdom =

Biotechnology in the United Kingdom is the British industry regarding organisms that manufacture commercial products, whether the genes of the organism have been naturally procured or not (synthetic biology). The industry can be controversial, and often overlaps with the healthcare and pharmaceutical industry (biopharmaceuticals). Currently, most industrial biotechnology expenditure in the UK is in the field of healthcare, and consequently the UK is the leader in Europe in the development of biopharmaceuticals, by some distance.

== History ==
Celltech, founded in 1980, was one of the earliest British biotechs.

In 2015, the UK had around 225 main biotechnology companies, turning over around £2.9bn. Exports accounted for around £1.5bn of turnover. The UK has an estimated 5% share of the global market. In Europe, by patent applications submitted under the Patent Cooperation Treaty, the UK is third, second to Germany and France but seventh in the world.

=== Employment ===
Around 8,800 people in the UK are directly employed in biotechnology, so it is not a labour-intensive industry. Other spending by British biotechnology companies supports around 11,000 other workers indirectly. The average income for a worker in the British industry is around £48,000; in London, this is £70,000. Employment is most found in London, South East England, North West England and Scotland.

=== Research ===
Around £920m is spent on biotechnology research in the UK, around 4.5% of all private sector research and development. According to an OECD study, the UK is fourth in the world for expenditure on biotechnology research, after the USA, France and Switzerland. France spends around twice that of the UK on biotechnology. The expenditure on biotechnology research in the USA is far larger than any other country.

The UK biotechnology industry leads in biopharmaceuticals research in Europe, well ahead of Switzerland and Germany, in terms of numbers of products being developed.

=== Organisations ===
Organisations that represent the British biotechnology industry are EuropaBio (Europe-wide in Brussels) and the Biotechnology and Biological Sciences Research Council (BBSRC) in Swindon. The National Centre for Biotechnology Education supports secondary schools. The Medicines and Healthcare products Regulatory Agency (MHRA) regulates biopharmaceuticals in the UK.

== See also ==
- Genetic engineering in Europe
- Regulation of genetic engineering
