= Fairy Stakes =

Fairy Stakes フェアリーステークス
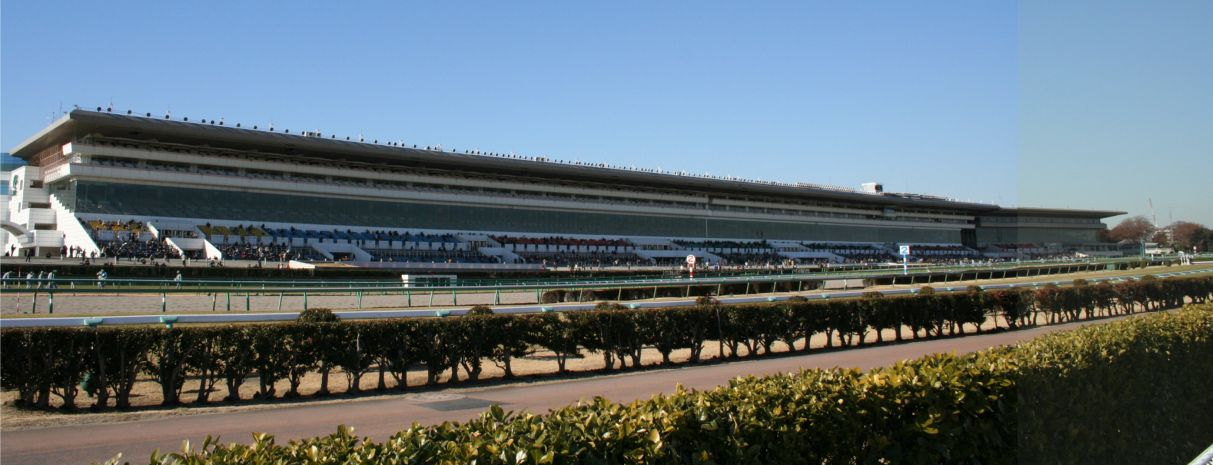
- Nakayama Racecourse Grandstand
- Class: Grade 3
- Location: Nakayama Racecourse
- Inaugurated: December 15, 1984
- Race type: Thoroughbred Flat racing

Race information
- Distance: 1600 metres
- Surface: Turf
- Track: Right-handed
- Qualification: 3-y-o f
- Weight: 55 kg
- Purse: ¥ 82,380,000 (as of 2025): 1st: ¥ 38,000,000; 2nd: ¥ 15,000,000; 3rd: ¥ 10,000,000

The Fairy Stakes (フェアリーステークス) is a Grade 3 (GIII) flat horse race in Japan.

== Background ==
The Fairy Stakes is a Grade III Thoroughbred race in Japan restricted exclusively to 3-year-old fillies. It is held annually in early to mid-January at Nakayama Racecourse over a distance of 1,600 meters on turf (outer course). Eligible entrants must have raced at least once and cannot be unraced or maiden horses. The field includes JRA-trained fillies, up to two certified NAR (local) fillies, and foreign-trained fillies with priority entry.

The race is run under weight-for-age conditions, with all fillies carrying 55 kg. The first-place prize in 2026 is ¥38 million.

== History ==
The Fairy Stakes originated as the “TV Tokyo Sho 3-Year-Old Fillies Stakes”, first run on December 15, 1984, at Nakayama Racecourse over 1,600 meters. It was created as a late-season test for juvenile fillies. In 1991, the distance was shortened to 1,200 meters, aligning it more with sprint-oriented development. This format lasted until 2007. In 1994, the race was renamed “Fairy Stakes” after TV Tokyo shifted its sponsorship to the Aoba Sho. Internationalization progressed gradually: foreign-bred fillies were allowed from 1993, NAR fillies from 1996 (initially 3 runners, later reduced to 2 in 2009), and foreign-trained fillies from 2009, when the race became an international GIII event.

A restructuring occurred in 2008: the race was not held that year due to a schedule shift, and from 2009 onward, it moved to January and reverted to 1,600 meters, positioning it as a key early prep race for the Oka Sho (Japanese 1000 Guineas) within Japan’s 3-year-old filly classic trail. Weight conditions also evolved: originally 54 kg under international age standards (post-2001), it briefly used special weight from 2009–2023 before returning to fixed weight-for-age (55 kg) in 2024.

== Past winners ==
Year	Winner	Age	Length (in m)	Jockey	Trainer	Owner	Time
1984	Elps	2	T1600	Kito Takayuki	Hisatsune Hisao	Yasuo Obata	1:35.4
1985	Mejiro Ramonu	2	T1600	Kasazaki Masatsugu	Okudaira Shinji	Mejiro Farm Ltd.	1:34.9
1986	Kosei	2	T1600	Masuzawa Sueo	Oshida Moritsugu	IKT Owners Co. Ltd.	1:35.7
1987	Shino Cross	2	T1600	Shimada Isao	Nishizuka Tokachi	Yutaka Fukui	1:36.3
1988	Cutting Edge	2	T1600	Ebisawa Seiji	Takahashi Hideo	Shadai Race Horse Ltd.	1:35.3
1989	Yamatake Sally	2	T1600	Shibata Yoshitomi	Hatakeyama Shigenori	Takeyuki Yamanaka	1:35.5
1990	Blue Bay Bridge	2	T1600	Fujiwara Hideyuki	Yamada Yoichi	Kingo Sakurai	1:35.5
1991	Disco Hall	2	T1200	Okabe Yukio	Yamauchi Kenji	Shadai Race Horse Ltd.	1:09.3
1992	Mazato Toshou	2	T1200	Hori Noriyuki	Okudaira Shinji	Tosho Sangyo Co. Ltd.	1:09.6
1993	Nagara Flash	2	T1200	Yasuda Takayuki	Seguchi Tsutomu	Nagara Tourism Co. Ltd.	1:09.6
1994	Prime Stage	2	T1200	Okabe Yukio	Ito Yuji	Hideo Yokoyama	1:09.2
1995	Max Rose	2	T1200	Shibata Yoshitomi	Ito Yuji	Yu Tadokoro	1:09.2
1996	Hishi Nile	2	T1200	Mato Hitoshi	Nakano Ryunen	Masaichiro Abe	1:10.8
1997	Lady Stella	2	T1200	Hori Noriyuki	Ikegami Taro	Royal Farm	1:10.4
1998	Tayasu Bloom	2	T1200	Ebina Masayoshi	Yamauchi Kenji	Kanichi Yokose	1:09.8
1999	Belle G. Ticket	2	T1200	Shibata Yoshitomi	Tezuka Takahisa	Shunichi Yamada	1:10.3
2000	Tenshino Kiseki	2	T1200	Teruo Eda	Kojiro Hashiguchi	Masuo Sugiya	1:09.4
2001	Saga Novel	2	T1200	Norihiro Yokoyama	Fumio Koga	Koji Maeda	1:07.8
2002	White Carnival	2	T1200	Dario Vargiu	Keizo Ito	Grand Ranch Ltd.	1:09.2
2003	Maltese Heat	2	T1200	Dario Vargiu	Masahiro Sakaguchi	Yoshio Fujita	1:09.2
2004	Felicia	2	T1200	Norihiro Yokoyama	Hiroyuki Uehara	Sunday Racing Ltd.	1:08.5
2005	Daiwa Passion	2	T1200	Kodai Hasegawa	Sueo Masuzawa	Keizo Oshiro	1:09.8
2006	Apollo Tiara	2	T1200	Masaki Katsuura	Isamu Shibasaki	Apollo Thoroughbred Club	1:09.4
2007	Le Lupin Bleu	2	T1200	Hayato Yoshida	Katsumi Sakamoto	Yoshie Iida	1:09.8
(No Race in 2008)
2009	Germinal	3	T1600	Yuichi Fukunaga	Hideaki Fujiwara	Shadai Race Horse Ltd.	1:36.5
2010	Cosmo Nemo Shin	3	T1600	Shu Ishibashi	Hidekatsu Shimizu	Big Red Farm Ltd.	1:34.8
2011	Dance Fantasia	3	T1600	Anthony Crastus	Kazuo Fujisawa	Shadai Race Horse Ltd.	1:33.7
2012	Tosen Benizakura	3	T1600	Akihide Tsumura	Isamu Shibasaki	Takaya Shimakawa	1:35.5
2013	Crown Rose	3	T1600	Kousei Miura	Shoichi Temma	Yasuhiro Yano	1:34.7
2014	Omega Heart Rock	3	T1600	Keita Tosaki	Noriyuki Hori	Reiko Hara	1:36.3
2015	Not Formal	3	T1600	Hiroto Mayuzumi	Eiji Nakano	Katsuya Haga	1:35.2
2016	B B Barrel	3	T1600	Shu Ishibashi	Hideki Kakugawa	Katsuhiko Bando	1:34.3
2017	Rising Reason	3	T1600	Kyosuke Maruta	Takeshi Okumura	Makio Okada	1:34.7
2018	Primo Scene	3	T1600	Keita Tosaki	Tetsuya Kimura	Silk Racing Ltd.	1:34.6
2019	Figlia Pura	3	T1600	Genki Maruyama	Takanori Kikuzawa	Carrot Farm Ltd.	1:36.0
2020	Smile Kana	3	T1600	Daichi Shibata	Yoshiyasu Takahashi	Shigeyuki Okada	1:34.0
2021	Fine Rouge	3	T1600	Christophe Lemaire	Tetsuya Kimura	Kenichi Mutsui	1:34.4
2022	Lilac	3	T1600	Mirco Demuro	Ikuo Aizawa	Seiichi Serizawa	1:35.2
2023	Kita Wing	3	T1600	Makoto Sugihara	Shigeyuki Kojima	Mill Farm Ltd.	1:34.3
2024	Ipheion	3	T1600	Atsuya Nishimura	Yoshiaki Sugiyama	Shadai Race Horse Ltd.	1:34.0
2025	Erika Express	3	T1600	Keita Tosaki	Haruki Sugiyama	Masahiro Miki	1:32.8
2026	Black Chalice	3	T1600	Akihide Tsumura	Koshiro Take	Field Racing	1:33.6

== See also ==
- Horse racing in Japan
- List of Japanese flat horse races

=== Netkeiba ===
- 1993 en, 1994 en, 1995 en, 1996 en, 1997 en, 1998 en, 1999 en, 2000 en, 2001 en, 2002 en, 2003 en, 2004 en, 2005 en, 2006 en, 2007 en, 2009 en, 2010 en, 2011 en, 2012 en, 2013 en, 2014 en, 2015 en, 2016 en, 2017 en, 2018 en, 2019 en, 2020 en, 2021 en, 2022 en, 2023 en, 2024 en, 2025 en, 2026 en
