= Akihide Tsumura =

Japanese jockey (born 1986

Akihide Tsumura 津村明秀
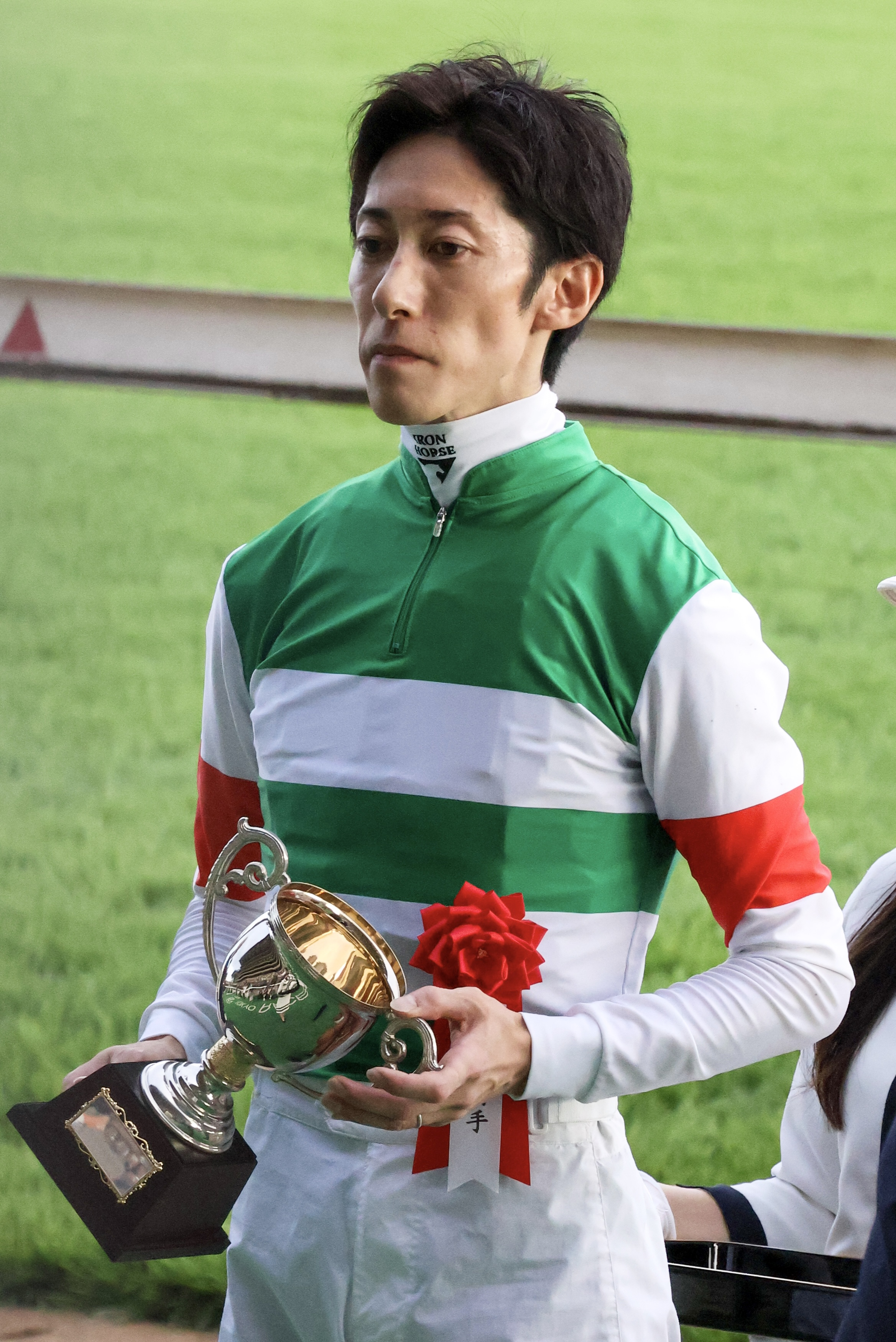
- Tsumura after winning the 2025 Mainichi Okan

Personal information
- Nationality: Japanese
- Born: January 5, 1986 (age 40) Funabashi, Chiba, Japan
- Occupation: Jockey

Horse racing career
- Sport: Horse racing
- Career wins: n/a

Racing awards
- n/a

Significant horses
- Curren Bouquetd'or, Ten Happy Rose

Akihide Tsumura (津村明秀) is an active Japanese jockey of thoroughbred race horses.

In 2024, he won his first Grade 1 race with Ten Happy Rose at the Victoria Mile.

On October 5, 2025, he won the Mainichi Ōkan with Lebensstil, marking his first GII victory.
