= Corran =

Corran may refer to:

== Given name ==
- Corran Addison, South African canoeist
- Corran Horn, fictional character from the Star Wars franchise
- Corran McLachlan, scientist and entrepreneur
- Coran: character from Voltron

== Surname ==
- Andrew Corran, born 1936, English cricketer and schoolmaster

== Places ==
- Corran, Loch Hourn, a village in Lochalsh, Scotland
- Corran, Lochaber, a village on Loch Linnhe
- Corran Ferry that plies across Loch Linnhe
- Corran Narrows, a narrow strait in Loch Linnhe
- Corran, County Cavan, a townland in the parish of Templeport, County Cavan
- Corran, County Armagh, a townland in County Armagh, Northern Ireland
- Corran (barony), County Sligo, Ireland
- Corran Tuathail, a mountain west of Killarney, Ireland

== See also ==
- Corann, an ancient Irish territory (tuath) in northwest Connacht
- Coran (disambiguation)
