= Coran =

Coran is an infrequently used English spelling of Qur'an (the main Islamic religious text).

It may also refer to:

- Coran (river), a tributary of the Charente in France
- Coran Capshaw, manager of the Dave Matthews Band
- Coracholan languages, an alternative name for a language group within the Uto-Aztecan family, spoken in the Mexican states of Jalisco and Nayarit
- Coran the elf, a Baldur's Gate non-player character, voiced by Brian George
- Circle Seven Koran, the holy scripture of the Moorish Science Temple of America
- Coran, character of the Voltron TV-Series franchise.

== See also ==
- Corran (disambiguation)
