= Yamanin Sucre =

Japanese Thoroughbred racehorse

Yamanin Sucre; ヤマニンシュクル
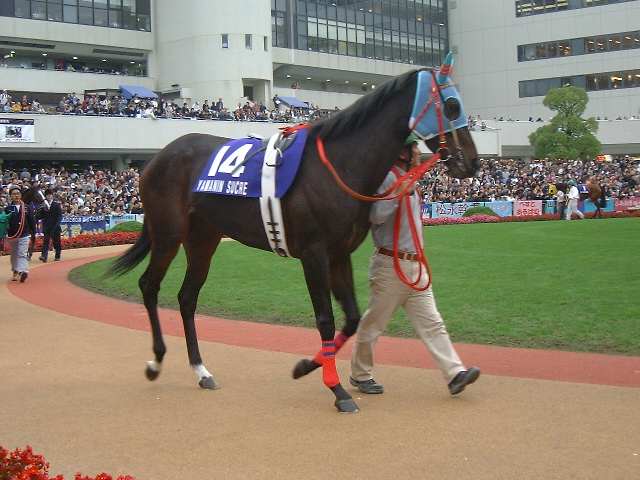
- Yamanin Sucre in 2005
- Breed: Thoroughbred
- Sire: Tokai Teio
- Grandsire: Symboli Rudolf
- Dam: Yamanin Jewely
- Damsire: Nijinsky
- Sex: Mare
- Foaled: April 1, 2001
- Country: Japan
- Colour: Dark Bay
- Owner: Doi Hajime
- Racing colours
- Trainer: Hidekazu Asami
- Jockey: Hirofumi Shii
- Record: 19: 4-3-4
- Earnings: ¥269,628,000

Major wins
- Hanshin Juvenile Fillies (2003); Nakayama Himba Stakes (2006)

Awards
- JRA Award for Best Two-Year-Old Filly (2003)
- Last updated on 11 September 2026

Yamanin Sucre (Japanese: ヤマニンシュクル, Hepburn: Yamanin Shukuru; April 1, 2001) is a Japanese Thoroughbred racehorse and broodmare. In 2003, she won the Hanshin Juvenile Fillies and was named the JRA Best Two-Year-Old Filly.

Her name is derived from the owner's customary prefix "Yamanin" and "sucre", the French word for "sugar".

== Racing career ==
=== 2003: two-year-old-season ===
Yamanin Sucre won her debut race at Hakodate Racecourse in the summer of 2003, before finishing second in the Clover Sho at Sapporo. She subsequently won the Cosmos Sho, increasing her earning enough to be able to participate in stakes races. She continued to perform well in the Sapporo Nisai Stakes, finishing third.

In the Hanshin Juvenile Fillies at the end of the year, she was only the sixth favoured to win, with bettors preferring mares with stronger pedigrees or better performance, such as Sweep Tosho and Fille de Reve. She broke well, and settled into third or fourth place throughout the race; in the final strides, she passed several horses and caught up to the pace setter, Yamanin Alcyon, winning by a neck. Following the turn of the year, she was named the 2003 JRA Award for Best Two-Year-Old Filly, with 277 out of 287 total votes.

=== 2004: three-year-old-season ===
As a three-year-old, Yamanin Sucre began her campaign with a third-place finish in the Tulip Sho and went on to produce a series of consistent performances on the fillies' classic circuit; she finished third in the Oka Shō, fifth in the Yushun Himba (Japanese Oaks), and second in the Shūka Shō. She also placed third at the Grade 3 Queen Stakes. Although she repeatedly finished narrowly short of victory, she was unable to win a race that season. During training, it was discovered she had developed tendonitis, forcing her to go on a year-long leave to recover.

=== 2005: four-year-old-season ===
In 2005, she returned to racing toward the end of the year, finishing fourth as the eight favorite in the Queen Elizabeth II Cup. In her next start, the Grade 3 Naruo Kinen, she faced male horses for the first time time, and finished seventh, failing to place in the top five for the first time in her career.

=== 2006: five-year-old-season ===
As a five-year-old, Yamanin Sucre began the year with a fourth-place finish in the Kyoto Himba Stakes. In her next start, the Nakayama Himba Stakes, she was voted the favorite for the first time since her debut, and managed to secure the victory, her first in two years and four months. She continued to perform well on the fillies' circuit, notably finishing second in the Queen Stakes during the summer.

Seeking redemption for her defeat the previous year, she returned to the Queen Elizabeth II Cup. As she attempted to make her move entering the final straight, her path was obstructed by Kawakami Princess, who passed aggressively and bumped Sucre. After the race, Yamanin Sucre's jockey, Hirofumi Shii, dismounted, and she was examined by a veterinary team. She was subsequently diagnosed with an incomplete rupture of the superficial digital flexor tendon in her right foreleg, having lost her balance when her path was obstructed.

Yamanin Sucre crossed the finish line in 12th place, resulting in an 11th-place finish after the subsequent placing adjustment and marking the first double-digit finish of her career; Kawakami Princess, who crossed the finish line first, was demoted to 12th place for the interference. Yamanin Sucre was delisted from racing on November 18, 2006, less than a week later.

Following her retirement, Yamanin Sucre was kept as a broodmare at Nishikioka Farm in Hokkaido. Expectations were high, given her distinguished female family, and her descent from Tokai Teio. However, none of her offspring achieved notable success. She retired from broodmare duties in 2020 and, from 2021, became one of the horses covered by the Retired Racehorses Care and Exhibition Program.

== Racing record ==
Date	Track	Name	Grade	Field	Finished	Jockey	Distance	Time	Winner (Runner-up)
2003: two-year-old-season
Jul 19	Hakodate	Two-year-old Newcomer		10	1st	Hirofumi Shii	1800m	1:57.5	(Special Bach)
Aug 30	Sapporo	Clover Stakes	OP	11	2nd	Hirofumi Shii	1500m	1:30.4	Kyowa Splendor
Sep 13	Sapporo	Cosmos Stakes	OP	10	1st	Hiroshi Kitamura	1800m	1:51.8	(Moere Espoir)
Oct 4	Sapporo	Sapporo Nisai Stakes	G3	14	3rd	Hirofumi Shii	1800m	1:54.4	Moere Espoir
Dec 7	Hanshin	Hanshin Juvenile Fillies	G1	18	1st	Hirofumi Shii	1600m	1:35.9	(Yamanin Alcyon)
2004: three-year-old-season
Mar 6	Hanshin	Tulip Sho	G3	15	3rd	Hirofumi Shii	1600m	1:34.7	Sweep Tosho
Apr 11	Hanshin	Oka Shō	G1	18	3rd	Hirofumi Shii	1600m	1:34.3	Dance in the Mood
May 23	Tokyo	Yushun Himba	G1	18	5th	Hirofumi Shii	2400m	2:28.1	Daiwa El Cielo
Aug 15	Sapporo	Queen Stakes	G3	13	3rd	Hirofumi Shii	1800m	1:47.8	Osumi Haruka
Oct 17	Kyoto	Shūka Shō	G1	18	2nd	Hirofumi Shii	2000m	1:58.5	Sweep Tosho
2005: four-year-old-season
Nov 13	Kyoto	Queen Elizabeth II Cup	G1	18	4th	Hirofumi Shii	2200m	2:13.1	Sweep Tosho
Dec 11	Hanshin	Naruo Kinen	G3	13	7th	Futoshi Komaki	2000m	2:02.4	Mejiro Mantle
2006: five-year-old-season
Jan 29	Kyoto	Kyoto Himba Stakes	G3	16	4th	Hirofumi Shii	1600m	1:33.6	Meine Samantha
Mar 12	Hanshin	Nakayama Himba Stakes	G3	16	1st	Hirofumi Shii	1800m	1:47.8	(Dia de la Novia)
May 14	Tokyo	Victoria Mile	G1	18	7th	Hirofumi Shii	1600m	1:34.8	Dance in the Mood
Jun 18	Kyoto	Mermaid Stakes	G3	14	8th	Hirofumi Shii	2000m	2:01.6	Solid Platinum
Aug 13	Sapporo	Queen Stakes	G3	14	2nd	Hirofumi Shii	1800m	1:47.0	Daring Heart
Oct 15	Tokyo	Fuchu Himba Stakes	G3	16	7th	Hirofumi Shii	1800m	1:48.1	Daring Heart
Nov 12	Kyoto	Queen Elizabeth II Cup	G1	15	11th	Hirofumi Shii	2200m	2:12.8	Fusaichi Pandora

== Breeding record ==
c = colt, f = filly

No.	Name	Year	Sex	Color	Sire	Wins	Races	Remarks
1st	Yamanin Sham	2008	c	Brown	Deep Impact	0	1	Deceased
2nd	Yamanin Bliss	2009	c	Dark Bay	Admire Moon	5	64	Retired
3rd	Yamanin Espuma	2010	c	Bay	Admire Moon	0	1	Retired
4th	Yamanin Lupo	2011	c	Bay	Special Week	1	15	Retired, showhorse
5th	Yamanin Najah	2012	f	Dark Bay	Deep Impact	1	22	Retired, broodmare
6th	Yamanin Brazuca	2013	c	Bay	Deep Impact	0	15	Retired
	(not foaled)	2014			Deep Brillante			
7th	(Yamanin Sucre 2015)	2015	c	Bay	King's Best			
8th	Yamanin Cerisier	2016	f	Bay	King's Best	0	2	Retired
	(abortion)	2017			Just A Way			
9th	Yamanin Javelin	2018	c	Dark Bay	Fenomeno	0	72	Retired
10th	Yamanin Fleurir	2019	f	Bay	Daiwa Major	1	37	Retired
11th	Yamanin Tinku	2020	f	Bay	Isla Bonita	0	3	Retired
	(not foaled)	2021			Just A Way			

== In popular culture ==
An anthropomorphized version appears as a non-playable character in the Japanese multimedia franchise Umamusume: Pretty Derby. While she is not officially licensed for the game (she is instead given the name "Sugar Nymph" during races and is referred to as "Umamusume with Blue Ribbons" in game dialogue), she is featured heavily in Sweep Tosho's story, reflecting the real-life competition the horses had against each other. She is also shown as reluctant to race following a collision with Kawakami Princess, again alluding to the horse's real-life injury.

== Pedigree ==
Pedigree of Yamanin Sucre (JPN)
Sire Tokai Teio (JPN) 1988	Symboli Rudolf (JPN); 1981	Partholon	Milesian
Sire Tokai Teio (JPN) 1988	Symboli Rudolf (JPN); 1981	Partholon	Paleo
Sire Tokai Teio (JPN) 1988	Symboli Rudolf (JPN); 1981	Sweet Luna	Speed Symboli
Sire Tokai Teio (JPN) 1988	Symboli Rudolf (JPN); 1981	Sweet Luna	Dance Time
Sire Tokai Teio (JPN) 1988	Tokai Natural (JPN); 1982	Nice Dancer	Northern Dancer
Sire Tokai Teio (JPN) 1988	Tokai Natural (JPN); 1982	Nice Dancer	Nice Princess
Sire Tokai Teio (JPN) 1988	Tokai Natural (JPN); 1982	Tokai Midori	Faberge
Sire Tokai Teio (JPN) 1988	Tokai Natural (JPN); 1982	Tokai Midori	Tokai Queen
Dam Yamanin Jewely (JPN) 1991	Nijinsky (CAN); 1967	Northern Dancer	Nearctic
Dam Yamanin Jewely (JPN) 1991	Nijinsky (CAN); 1967	Northern Dancer	Natalma
Dam Yamanin Jewely (JPN) 1991	Nijinsky (CAN); 1967	Flaming Page	Bull Page
Dam Yamanin Jewely (JPN) 1991	Nijinsky (CAN); 1967	Flaming Page	Flaring Top
Dam Yamanin Jewely (JPN) 1991	Tiffany Lass (USA); 1983	Bold Forbes	Irish Castle
Dam Yamanin Jewely (JPN) 1991	Tiffany Lass (USA); 1983	Bold Forbes	Comely Nell
Dam Yamanin Jewely (JPN) 1991	Tiffany Lass (USA); 1983	Sally Stark	Graustark
Dam Yamanin Jewely (JPN) 1991	Tiffany Lass (USA); 1983	Sally Stark	Sally Ship

- Family: 3-c.
- Yamanin Sucre is inbred to Northern Dancer 4 × 3, meaning the horse appears once in both her 4th and 3rd generation. This information is available on netkeiba.
