= Nakayama Himba Stakes =

Nakayama Himba Stakes 中山牝馬ステークス
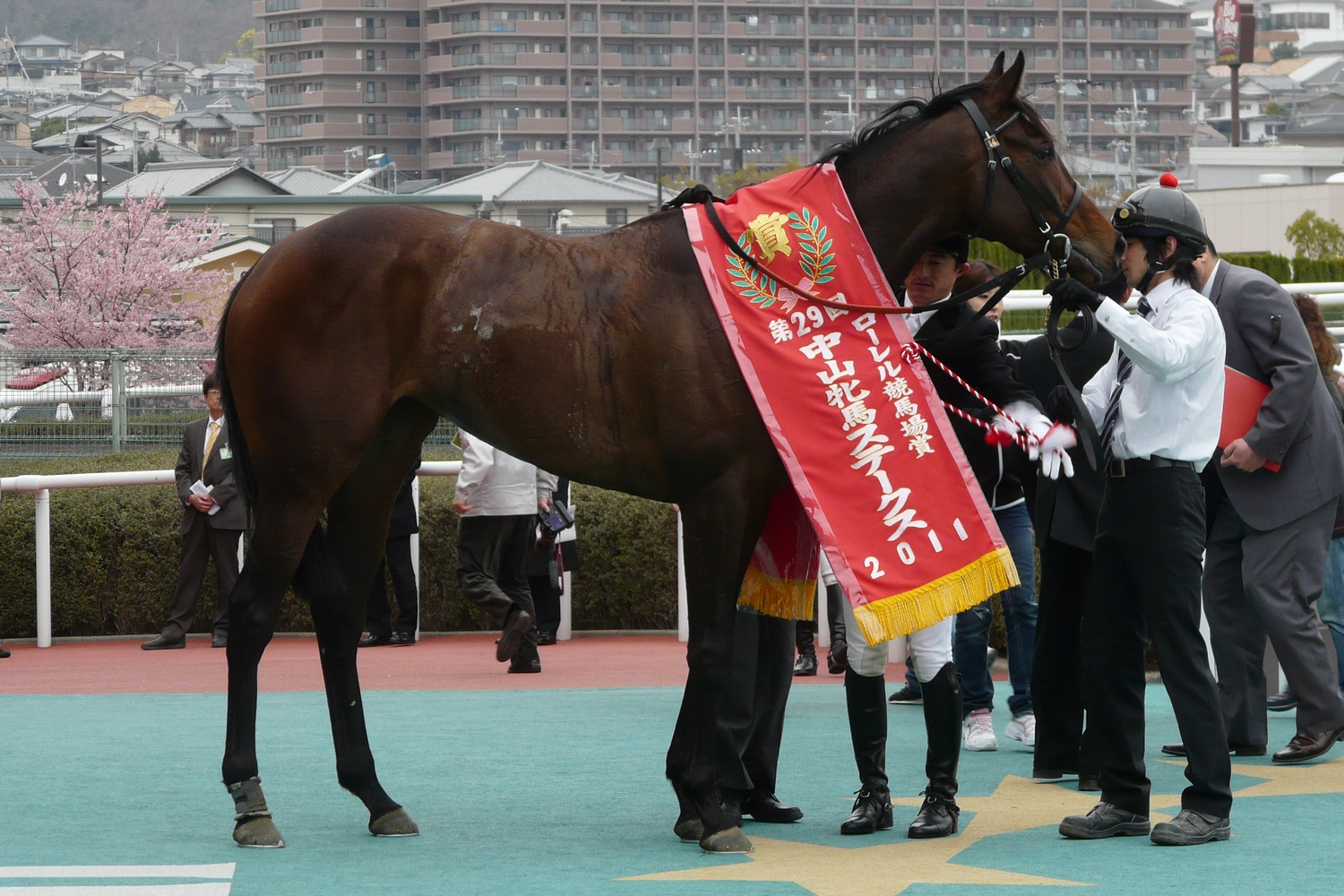
- Lady Alba Rosa after winning the 2011 Nakayama Himba Stakes
- Class: Grade 3
- Location: Nakayama Racecourse
- Inaugurated: 1983
- Race type: Thoroughbred Flat racing

Race information
- Distance: 1800 metres
- Surface: Turf
- Track: Right-handed
- Qualification: 4-y-o+ fillies and mares
- Weight: Handicap
- Purse: ¥ 82,380,000 (as of 2025): 1st: ¥ 38,000,000; 2nd: ¥ 15,000,000; 3rd: ¥ 10,000,000

The Nakayama Himba Stakes (Japanese 中山牝馬ステークス) is a Japanese Grade 3 horse race for Thoroughbred fillies and mares aged four and over, run in March over a distance of 1800 metres on turf at Nakayama Racecourse.

The Nakayama Himba Stakes was first run in 1983 and has held Grade 3 status since 1984 when the grade system was introduced . The race was run at Tokyo Racecourse in 1988 and at Hanshin Racecourse in 2011. In 2006, the route for stakes races for fillies aged four and over was established, and the race became a preliminary race to the newly established Victoria Mile.

== Winners since 2000 ==
Year	Winner	Age	Jockey	Trainer	Owner	Time
2000	Red Chili Pepper	4	Norihiro Yokoyama	Hiroyoshi Matsuda	Kazuko Yoshida	1:48.5
2001	Eishin Rudens	5	Yoshitomi Shibata	Akira Nomoto	Toyomitsu Hirai	1:49.5
2002	Diamond Biko	4	Olivier Peslier	Kazuo Fujisawa	Shinobu Osako	1:45.4
2003	Lady Pastel	5	Masayoshi Ebina	Kiyotaka Tanaka	Lord Horse Club	1:46.7
2004	Osumi Cosmo	5	Masayoshi Ebina	Tadashi Nakao	Hidenori Yamaji	1:46.1
2005	Winglet	4	Katsuharu Tanaka	Yoshitada Munakata	Shadai Race Horse	1:49.7
2006	Yamanin Sucre	5	Hirofumi Shii	Hidekazu Asami	Hajime Doi	1:47.8
2007	Meine Samantha	7	Masayoshi Ebina	Hitoshi Nakamura	Thoroughbred Club Ruffian	1:50.2
2008	Yamaninmerveilleux	6	Yuichi Shibayama	Hironori Kurita	Hajime Doi	1:48.4
2009	Kiss To Heaven	6	Norihiro Yokoyama	Hirofumi Toda	Kazuko Yoshida	1:49.1
2010	Nishino Blue Moon	6	Hiroshi Kitamura	Nobuhiro Suzuki	Shigeyuki Nishiyama	1:47.6
2011	Lady Alba Rosa	4	Yuichi Fukunaga	Kazuhide Sasada	Lord Horse Club	1:45.4
2012	Lady Alba Rosa	5	Yuichi Fukunaga	Kazuhide Sasada	Lord Horse Club	1:50.6
2013	Meine Isabel	5	Masami Matsuoka	Takahiro Mizuno	Thoroughbred Club Ruffian	1:48.5
2014	Hula Bride	5	Manabu Sakai	Kazuyoshi Kihara	Kazuko Yoshida	1:48.5
2015	Bounce Shasse	4	Hironobu Tanabe	Kazuo Fujisawa	Carrot Farm	1:47.5
2016	Sundarbans	5	Yutaka Yoshida	Eichi Yano	Shimokobe Farm	1:50.3
2017	Tosen Victory	5	Yutaka Take	Katsuhiko Sumii	Takaya Shimakawa	1:49.4
2018	Kawakita Enka	4	Kenichi Ikezoe	Tamio Hamada	Yoshio Kawashima	1:49.0
2019	Frontier Queen	6	Kousei Miura	Sakae Kunieda	Sankyo Farm	1:47.7
2020	Fairy Polka	4	Ryuji Wada	Masayuki Nishimura	Takeshi Yamamoto	1:50.8
2021	Rambling Alley	5	Yutaka Take	Yasuo Tomomichi	Shadai Race Horse	1:54.8
2022	Kurino Premium	5	Masami Matsuoka	Shinichi Ito	Hiroharu Kurimoto	1:46.8
2023	Through Seven Seas	5	Christophe Lemaire	Tomohito Ozeki	Carrot Farm	1:46.5
2024	Conch Shell	4	Mirai Iwata	Hisashi Shimizu	Shinji Maeda	1:49.0
2025	Shirankedo	5	Mirco Demuro	Mitsunori Makiura	Nisshin Holdings	1:47.1
2026	Ethelfleda	5	Miyabi Muto	Yoshinori Muto	Fumio Takahashi	1:47.1

== Earlier winners ==
- 1972 - Kuri Kent
- 1973 - Kyoei Green
- 1974 - Rafale
- 1975 - Kamino Chidori
- 1976 - Sakura Sedan
- 1977 - Shunsetsu
- 1978 - Shunsetsu
- 1979 - Yodo Hamanasu
- 1980 - My Elf
- 1981 - Fuji Madonna
- 1982 - Fuji Madonna
- 1983 - Dancing Fighter
- 1984 - Mejiro Heine
- 1985 - Shadai Cosmos
- 1986 - Yukino Rose
- 1987 - Katsu Dynamic
- 1988 - Soshin Hoju
- 1989 - Rikiai Northern
- 1990 - Jim Queen
- 1991 - Yukino Sunrise
- 1992 - Scarlet Bouquet
- 1993 - Rabbit Ball
- 1994 - Hokkai Seres
- 1995 - Alpha Cute
- 1996 - Prairie Queen
- 1997 - Syourinomegami
- 1998 - Mejiro Lambada
- 1999 - Narita Luna Park

== See also ==
- Horse racing in Japan
- List of Japanese flat horse races
