= Company (horse) =

Japanese Thoroughbred racehorse

Company カンパニー
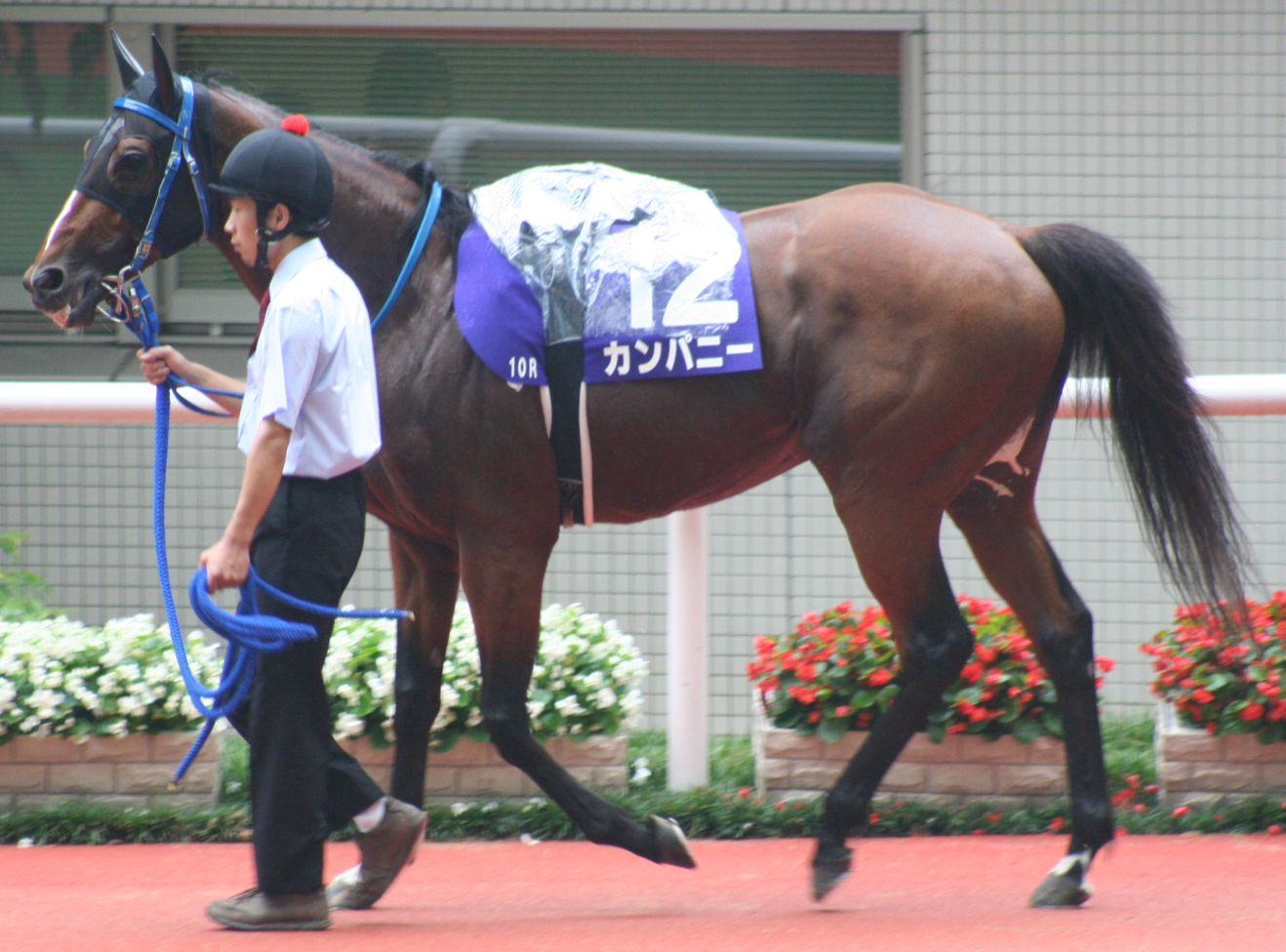
- Company in 2008
- Breed: Thoroughbred
- Sire: Miracle Admire
- Grandsire: Tony Bin
- Dam: Brilliant Very
- Damsire: Northern Taste
- Sex: Stallion
- Foaled: 24 April 2001
- Died: 29 December 2018 (aged 17)
- Country: Japan
- Color: Bay
- Breeder: Northern Farm
- Owner: Hideko Kondo
- Racing colours
- Trainer: Hidetaka Otonashi
- Jockey: Norihiro Yokoyama; Yuichi Fukunaga
- Record: 35: 12-4-1
- Earnings: ¥939,698,000

Major wins
- Sankei Osaka Hai (2006); Nakayama Kinen (2008, 2009); Yomiuri Milers Cup (2008); Mainichi Okan (2009); Tennō Shō Autumn (2009); Mile Championship (2009)

Awards
- JRA Special Award (2009)

Company (カンパニー, Hepburn: Kanpanī, 24 April 2001 – 29 December 2018) was a Japanese Thoroughbred racehorse. After losing to numerous G1 races, he finally won both the Autumn Tennō Shō and the Mile Championship in 2009 before retiring. Company's win in the Tennō Shō made him the first Japanese eight-year-old horse to win an international G1 race. His total earnings are 939,698,000 JPY.

== Background ==
Company was a bay horse foaled by Brilliant Very, a daughter of Northern Taste. His sire, Miracle Admire, is one of Tony Bin's foals, along with other Japanese racehorses such as Air Groove, Jungle Pocket, and North Flight. He was born on April 24, 2001, on the Northern Farm.

== Racing Record ==
Company was active from 2004 to 2009 and had a total of 35 starts, 12 of which he won.

Date	Race	Grade	Distance	Surface	Track	Entry	Finish	Time	Margin	Jockey	Winner (Runner-up)
2004 – three-year-old season
Jan 17	3YO DEBUT		1600m	Turf	Kyoto	8	1st	1:39.3	-0.2	Fumiaki Shibahara	(Lord Magician)
Feb 15	Kisaragi Sho	G3	1800m	Turf	Kyoto	14	7th	1:49.3	1.3	Futoshi Komaki	Meiner Brook
Mar 6	Azami Sho	ALW (1 Win)	1800m	Turf	Chukyo	16	1st	1:49.3	0.0	Fumiaki Shibahara	(Great Basin)
Apr 18	Benjamin Stakes	OP	1800m	Turf	Nakayama	10	1st	1:47.3	-0.2	Fumiaki Shibahara	(Tosen Altair)
Jul 4	Radio Tampa Sho	G3	1800m	Turf	Fukushima	15	2nd	1:47.1	0.0	Fumiaki Shibahara	Keiai Guard
Oct 24	Kikuka-shō	G1	3000m	Turf	Kyoto	18	9th	3:06.3	0.6	Fumiaki Shibahara	Delta Blues
Nov 27	Keihan Hai	G3	1800m	Turf	Kyoto	17	2nd	1:46.5	0.2	Katsumi Ando	Daiwa El Cielo
2005 – four-year-old season
Feb 27	Nakayama Kinen	G2	1800m	Turf	Nakayama	14	2nd	1:46.6	0.1	Katsumi Ando	Balance of Game
Apr 16	Yomiuri Milers Cup	G2	1600m	Turf	Hanshin	16	4th	1:33.8	0.3	Katsumi Ando	Lohengrin
Jun 5	Yasuda Kinen	G1	1600m	Turf	Tokyo	18	5th	1:32.6	0.3	Yuichi Fukunaga	Asakusa Den'en
Oct 9	Mainichi Ōkan	G2	1800m	Turf	Tokyo	17	7th	1:47.2	0.7	Yuichi Fukunaga	Sunrise Pegasus
Nov 26	Keihan Hai	G3	1800m	Turf	Tokyo	18	1st	1:44.8	-0.6	Yuichi Fukunaga	(Asaka Defeat)
2006 – five-year-old season
Feb 26	Nakayama Kinen	G2	1800m	Turf	Nakayama	12	4th	1:50.0	1.1	Yuichi Fukunaga	Balance of Game
Apr 2	Sankei Osaka Hai	G2	2000m	Turf	Hanshin	12	1st	2:04.5	-0.1	Yuichi Fukunaga	(Macky Max)
Jun 4	Yasuda Kinen	G1	1600m	Turf	Tokyo	18	11th	1:33.8	1.2	Hiroyuki Uchida	Bullish Luck
Jun 25	Takarazuka Kinen	G1	2200m	Turf	Kyoto	13	5th	2:14.1	1.1	Yuichi Fukunaga	Deep Impact
Oct 8	Mainichi Ōkan	G2	1800m	Turf	Tokyo	16	5th	1:45.7	0.2	Yuichi Fukunaga	Daiwa Major
Oct 29	Tennō Shō (Autumn)	G1	2000m	Turf	Tokyo	16	16th	2:01.4	2.6	Yuichi Fukunaga	Daiwa Major
2007 – six-year-old season
Aug 5	Sekiya Kinen	G3	1600m	Turf	Niigata	18	1st	1:31.8	-0.6	Yuichi Fukunaga	(Symboli Gran)
Oct 28	Tennō Shō (Autumn)	G1	2000m	Turf	Tokyo	16	3rd	1:58.8	0.4	Yuichi Fukunaga	Meisho Samson
Nov 18	Mile Championship	G1	1600m	Turf	Kyoto	18	5th	1:33.0	0.3	Yuichi Fukunaga	Daiwa Major
2008 – seven-year-old season
Feb 2	Tokyo Shimbun Hai	G3	1600m	Turf	Tokyo	16	4th	1:33.0	0.2	Yuichi Fukunaga	Laurel Guerreiro
Mar 2	Nakayama Kinen	G2	1800m	Turf	Nakayama	16	1st	1:47.3	-0.3	Norihiro Yokoyama	(Eishin Dover)
Apr 19	Yomiuri Milers Cup	G2	1600m	Turf	Hanshin	15	1st	1:33.6	0.0	Norihiro Yokoyama	(Nishino Manamusume)
Jun 29	Takarazuka Kinen	G1	2200m	Turf	Hanshin	14	8th	2:16.2	0.9	Norihiro Yokoyama	Eishin Deputy
Oct 12	Mainichi Ōkan	G2	1800m	Turf	Tokyo	16	5th	1:45.1	0.5	Norihiro Yokoyama	Super Hornet
Nov 2	Tennō Shō (Autumn)	G1	2000m	Turf	Tokyo	17	4th	1:57.2	0.0	Norihiro Yokoyama	Vodka
Nov 28	Mile Championship	G1	1600m	Turf	Kyoto	18	4th	1:32.9	0.3	Norihiro Yokoyama	Blumenblatt
2009 – eight-year-old season
Mar 1	Nakayama Kinen	G2	1800m	Turf	Nakayama	10	1st	1:49.2	0.0	Norihiro Yokoyama	(Dream Journey)
Apr 18	Yomiuri Milers Cup	G2	1600m	Turf	Tokyo	10	2nd	1:33.9	0.0	Norihiro Yokoyama	Super Hornet
Jun 7	Yasuda Kinen	G1	1600m	Turf	Tokyo	18	4th	1:33.8	0.3	Norihiro Yokoyama	Vodka
Jun 28	Takarazuka Kinen	G1	2200m	Turf	Hanshin	14	4th	2:11.7	0.4	Yasunari Iwata	Dream Journey
Oct 11	Mainichi Ōkan	G2	1800m	Turf	Tokyo	11	1st	1:45.3	-0.2	Norihiro Yokoyama	(Vodka)
Nov 1	Tennō Shō (Autumn)	G1	2000m	Turf	Tokyo	18	1st	1:57.2	-0.3	Norihiro Yokoyama	(Screen Hero)
Nov 22	Mile Championship	G1	1600m	Turf	Kyoto	18	1st	1:33.2	-0.2	Norihiro Yokoyama	(Meiner Falke)

== Stud record and death ==
Company was stationed in Shadai Stallion Station before moving into Breeder's Stallion Station in 2014. The next year, he was transferred again to Honda Toju Farm in Kumamoto as a replacement stud for Black Hawk who died in July. Company sired one graded stakes winner in Win Tenderness, who snatched Meguro Kinen in 2018.

He died on 29 December 2018 due to kidney failure caused by an intra-abdominal tumor.

== Pedigree ==
Pedigree of Company, bay horse, 2001
Sire Miracle Admire b. 1995	Tony Bin b. 1983	Kampala	Kalamoun
Sire Miracle Admire b. 1995	Tony Bin b. 1983	Kampala	State Pension
Sire Miracle Admire b. 1995	Tony Bin b. 1983	Severn Bridge	Hornbeam
Sire Miracle Admire b. 1995	Tony Bin b. 1983	Severn Bridge	Priddy Fair
Sire Miracle Admire b. 1995	Ballet Queen b. 1998	Sadler's Wells	Northern Dancer
Sire Miracle Admire b. 1995	Ballet Queen b. 1998	Sadler's Wells	Fairy Bridge
Sire Miracle Admire b. 1995	Ballet Queen b. 1998	Sun Princess	English Prince
Sire Miracle Admire b. 1995	Ballet Queen b. 1998	Sun Princess	Sunny Valley
Dam Brilliant Very ch. 1990	Northern Taste ch. 1971	Northern Dancer	Nearctic
Dam Brilliant Very ch. 1990	Northern Taste ch. 1971	Northern Dancer	Natalma
Dam Brilliant Very ch. 1990	Northern Taste ch. 1971	Lady Victoria	Victoria Park
Dam Brilliant Very ch. 1990	Northern Taste ch. 1971	Lady Victoria	Lady Angela
Dam Brilliant Very ch. 1990	Crafty Wife ch. 1985	Crafty Prospector	Mr. Prospector
Dam Brilliant Very ch. 1990	Crafty Wife ch. 1985	Crafty Prospector	Real Crafty Lady
Dam Brilliant Very ch. 1990	Crafty Wife ch. 1985	Wife Mistress	Secretariat
Dam Brilliant Very ch. 1990	Crafty Wife ch. 1985	Wife Mistress	Political Payoff
