= Keihan Hai =

Keihan Hai 京阪杯
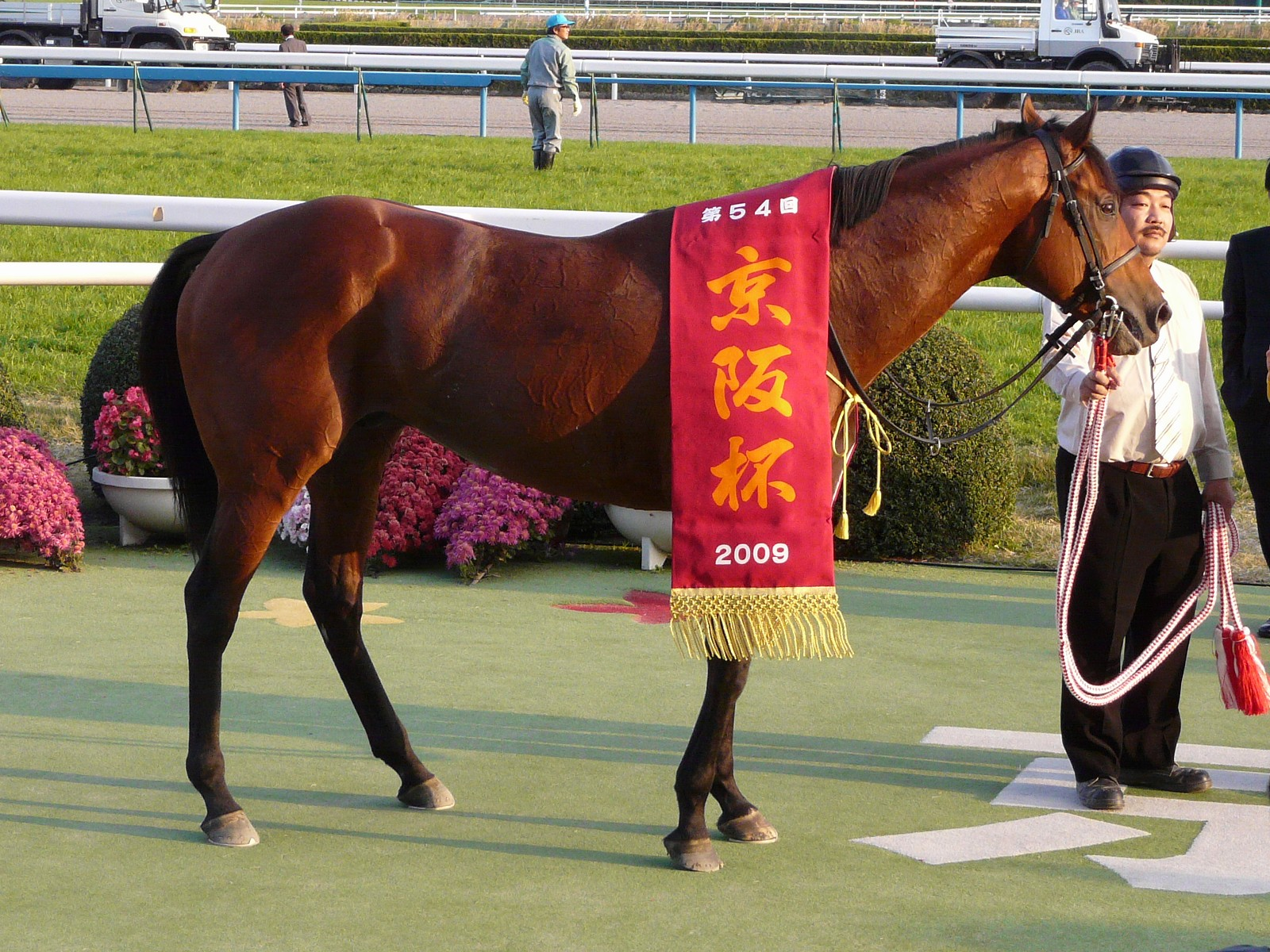
- The 2009 winner Premium Box
- Class: Grade 3
- Location: Kyoto Racecourse
- Inaugurated: 1956
- Race type: Thoroughbred Flat racing

Race information
- Distance: 1200 metres
- Surface: Turf
- Track: Right-handed
- Qualification: 3-y-o+
- Weight: Special Weight
- Purse: ¥ 87,960,000 (as of 2025): 1st: ¥ 41,000,000; 2nd: ¥ 16,000,000; 3rd: ¥ 10,000,000

The Keihan Hai (Japanese 京阪杯) is a Japanese Grade 3 horse race for Thoroughbreds aged three and over, run in November over a distance of 1200 metres on turf at Kyoto Racecourse.

It was first run in 1956 and has held Grade 3 status since 1984. The race was originally run over 2000 metres and was contested over 2200 metres in 1996 before being cut to 1800 metres a year later. It was first run over its current distance in 2006.

The race is named after its sponsor Keihan Holdings Co., Ltd., the holding company of Keihan Electric Railway. The winner receives the Keihan Holdings Co., Ltd. Prize.

== Weight ==
56 kg for three-year-olds, 57 kg for four-year-olds and above.

Allowances:

- 2 kg for fillies / mares
- 1 kg for southern hemisphere bred three-year-olds

Penalties (excluding two-year-old race performance):

- If a graded stakes race has been won within a year:
  - 3 kg for a grade 1 win (2 kg for fillies / mares)
  - 2 kg for a grade 2 win (1 kg for fillies / mares)
  - 1 kg for a grade 3 win
- If a graded stakes race has been won for more than a year:
  - 2 kg for a grade 1 win (1 kg for fillies / mares)
  - 1 kg for a grade 2 win

== Winners since 2000 ==
Year	Winner	Age	Jockey	Trainer	Owner	Time
2000	Joten Brave	3	Olivier Peslier	Ikuo Aizawa	Hisao Tanabe	1:45.2
2001	Tenzan Seiza	3	Hirofumi Shii	Hideaki Fujiwara	Saburo Hirano	1:45.6
2002	Sidewinder	4	Koshiro Take	Shuji Kitahashi	Kyoei	1:45.3
2003	Cheers Brightly	5	Masaru Honda	Kenji Yamauchi	Kiyoko Kitano	1:49.1
2004	Daiwa El Cielo	3	Yuichi Fukunaga	Kunihide Matsuda	Daiwa Shoji	1:46.3
2005	Company	4	Yuichi Fukunaga	Hidetaka Otonashi	Hideko Kondo	1:44.8
2006	Amberjack	3	Koshiro Take	Takao Nakano	Nisshin Bokujo	1:08.3
2007	Sans Adieu	5	Yutaka Take	Hidetaka Otonashi	Takao Matsuoka	1:07.9
2008	Western Dancer	4	Yuga Kawada	Hiroki Sakiyama	Ken Nishikawa	1:08.1
2009	Premium Box	6	Hideaki Miyuki	Hiroyuki Uehara	Shadai Race Horse	1:07.6
2010	Spring Song	5	Kenichi Ikezoe	Akio Tsurudome	Teruya Yoshida	1:08.0
2011	Lord Kanaloa	3	Yuichi Fukunaga	Takayuki Yasuda	Lord Horse Club	1:08.1
2012	Hakusan Moon	3	Manabu Sakai	Masato Nishizono	Goichi Kawasaki	1:08.5
2013	Earth Sonic	4	Mirco Demuro	Kazuya Nakatake	Koji Maeda	1:07.5
2014	Am Ball Bleiben	5	Ken Tanaka	Nobuharu Fukushima	Nobuyuki Ito	1:08.3
2015	Satono Lupin	4	Ryuji Wada	Akira Murayama	Hajime Satomi	1:07.4
2016	Nero	5	Mickael Barzalona	Hideyuki Mori	Shigeyuki Nishiyama	1:10.3
2017	Nero	6	Hiroto Yoshihara	Hideyuki Mori	Shigeyuki Nishiyama	1:08.8
2018	Danon Smash	3	Yuichi Kitamura	Takayuki Yasuda	Danox	1:08.0
2019	Right On Cue	4	Yoshihiro Furukawa	Mitsugu Kon	Godolphin	1:08.8
2020	Fiano Romano^{[a]}	6	Hayato Yoshida	Tomokazu Takano	Kazumi Yoshida	1:08.2
2021	Eighteen Girl^{[a]}	5	Shinichiro Akiyama	Yuji Iida	Yasushi Nakayama	1:08.8
2022	Toshin Macau^{[a]}	3	Katsuma Sameshima	Mizuki Takayanagi	Sato	1:07.2
2023	Toshin Macau	4	Akira Sugawara	Mizuki Takayanagi	Sato	1:07.4
2024	Big Caesar	4	Yuichi Kitamura	Masato Nishizono	Masanobu Habata	1:07.7
2025	A T Makfi	6	Akatsuki Tomita	Hidenori Take	Takahiro Okada	1:07.4

^{a} The 2020, 2021, & 2022 races took place at Hanshin Racecourse.

== Earlier winners ==
- 1956 - Minatori Yu
- 1957 - Number 11
- 1958 - Tatsuteru
- 1959 - Wakano King
- 1960 - Yamanin More
- 1961 - Maiden Lady
- 1962 - Takashige
- 1963 - Korai O
- 1964 - Yamanin Rvy
- 1965 - Yamahiro
- 1966 - Ballymoss Nisei
- 1967 - Native Runner
- 1968 - Hiro Daikoku
- 1969 - Kuri Kashiwa
- 1970 - Seven O
- 1971 - Thai Theft
- 1972 - Long One
- 1973 - Shibatake
- 1974 - East River
- 1975 - Erimo Kansei
- 1976 - Koichi Saburo
- 1977 - Silver Land
- 1978 - Machikane Taitei
- 1979 - Tamamo Remand
- 1980 - Tanino Tesco
- 1981 - Noto Diver
- 1982 - Noto Diver
- 1983 - Erimo Roller
- 1984 - Katsuragi Ace
- 1985 - Marubutsu Sir Pen
- 1986 - Single Roman
- 1987 - Maruka Seiko
- 1988 - Tosho Leo
- 1989 - Nihon Pillow Brave
- 1990 - Long Muteki
- 1991 - Ikuno Dictus
- 1992 - Mr Spain
- 1993 - Longchamp Boy
- 1994 - Nehai Caesar
- 1995 - Dantsu Seattle
- 1996 - Dance Partner
- 1997 - Erimo Dandy
- 1998 - Bravo Green
- 1999 - Rosado

== See also ==
- Horse racing in Japan
- List of Japanese flat horse races
