= Sweep Tosho =

Japanese-bred Thoroughbred racehorse

Sweep Tosho スイープトウショウ
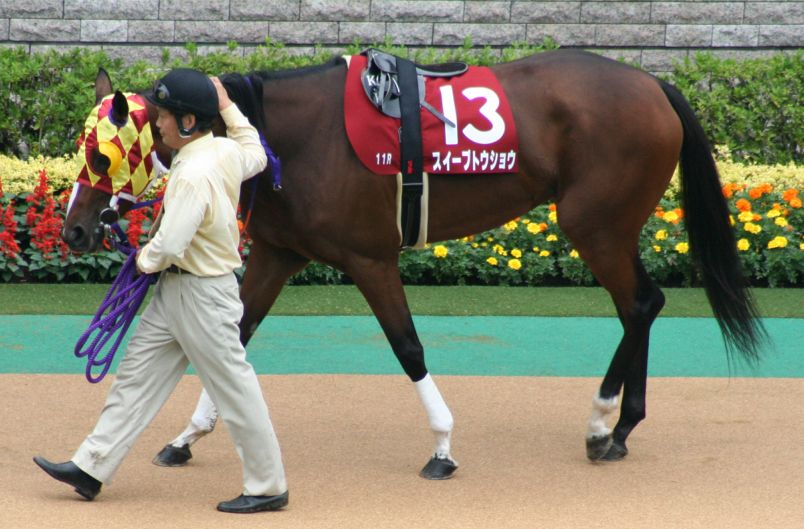
- Sweep Tosho at the paddock of the 2005 Mainichi Okan.
- Breed: Thoroughbred
- Sire: End Sweep (USA)
- Grandsire: Forty Niner (USA)
- Dam: Tabatha Tosho (JPN)
- Damsire: Dancing Brave (USA)
- Sex: Mare
- Foaled: May 9, 2001
- Died: December 5, 2020 (aged 19)
- Country: Japan
- Colour: Bay
- Breeder: Tosho Sangyo Corporation
- Owner: Tosho Sangyo
- Racing colours
- Trainer: Akio Tsurudome
- Jockey: Kenichi Ikezoe
- Record: 24: 8-4-2
- Earnings: ¥744,824,000

Major wins
- Fantasy Stakes (2003); Tulip Sho (2004); Takarazuka Kinen (2005); Queen Elizabeth II Cup (2005); Kyoto Daishoten (2006); Japanese Classic Tiara Race wins: Shuka Sho (2004)

Awards
- JRA Award for Best Older Filly or Mare (2005)

Sweep Tosho (Japanese: スイープトウショウ, Hepburn: Suīpu Toushou; May 9, 2001 – December 5, 2020) was a Japanese Thoroughbred racehorse and broodmare. Bred and owned by Tosho Sangyo and trained throughout her racing career by Akio Tsurudome, she won eight of her twenty-four races between October 2003 and November 2007, including Grade I victories in the Shuka Sho, Takarazuka Kinen and Queen Elizabeth II Cup.

In 2003 Sweep Tosho won two of her three races including the Grade III Fantasy Stakes. In the following year she won the Tulip Sho, and finished second in the Yushun Himba before winning the Shuka Sho. The mare reached her peak as a four-year-old in 2005 when she finished second in the Yasuda Kinen before defeating top-class male opposition in the Takarazuka Kinen and winning the Queen Elizabeth II Cup at her second attempt. She remained in training for two more years, winning the Kyoto Daishoten in 2006 and being placed in the Queen Elizabeth II Cup in 2006 and 2007.

After her retirement from racing, she became a broodmare and has had some success as a dam of winners before dying of colic in 2020 while pregnant with a foal that did not survive.

== Background ==
Sweep Tosho is a bay mare bred in Japan by her owner Tosho Sangyo Corporation. She was sired by End Sweep, an American horse who won six races in the United States including the Grade III Jersey Shore Breeders' Cup Stakes in 1994, and was later imported to Japan to become a breeding stallion. His other progeny have included Admire Moon (winner of the 2007 Japan Cup), Swept Overboard (2002 Metropolitan Handicap) and Rhein Kraft (2005 Oka Sho). Sweep Tosho's dam Tabatha Tosho showed modest racing ability, winning one minor race in 1997 from five starts. She was a distant, female-line descendant of the influential British broodmare Ballantrae. In addition, she was also a descendant of Saint Lite, the first Japanese Triple Crown winner, through his daughter Tomiyuki.

During her racing career Sweep Tosho was trained by Sadao Watanabe before moving to the stable of Akio Tsurudome in 2004. She was ridden in most of her races by Kenichi Ikezoe.

== Racing career ==
=== 2003: two-year-old season ===
Sweep Tosho made a successful track debut in a contest for previously unraced two-year-olds over 1400 metres at Kyoto Racecourse on 18 October. Three weeks later she was moved up in class for the Grade III Fantasy Stakes over the same course and distance and won again, beating Royal Selangor and ten other fillies. She was stepped up in class again in December for the Grade I Hanshin Juvenile Fillies over 1600 metres. In a blanket finish, she finished fifth behind Yamanin Sucre, Yamanin Alcyon, Concordia and Royal Selangor, beaten less than one and a half lengths by the winner.

=== 2004: three-year-old season ===
On her first appearance as a three-year-old Sweep Tosho won the Hobai Stakes over 1400 metres in January before contesting the Grade III Tulip Sho (a trial race for the Oka Sho) over 1600 metres at Hanshin in March. She won from Azuma Sanders with Yamanin Sucre in third place. In the Oka Sho, over the same course and distance on 11 April she finished fifth of the eighteen runners behind Dance In The Mood, Azuma Sanders, Yamanin Sucre and Move of Sunday. On 23 May the filly was moved up in distance for the Yushun Himba over 2400 metres at Tokyo Racecourse and finished three-quarters of a length second to Daiwa El Cielo with a gap of three lengths back to the others who were headed by Yamanin Alabaster, Dance In The Mood and Yamanin Sucre.

After a break of almost four months Sweep Tosho returned in September for the Grade II Rose Stakes (a trial for the Shuka Sho) over 200 metres at Hanshin and finished third behind Les Clefs d'Or and Glorious Days. In the Shuka Sho over the same distance on 17 October she faced seventeen opponents including Les Clefs d'Or, Glorious Days, Dance In The Mood, Yamanin Sucre, Yamanin Alabaster and Azuma Sanders. Sweep Tosho recorded her first Grade I success as she won by half a length from Yamanin Sucre with the pair finishing five lengths clear of Winglet in third place. On her final appearance of the season the filly was matched against older fillies and mares in the Queen Elizabeth II Commemorative Cup at Kyoto in November and finished fifth behind the four-year-old Admire Groove.

=== 2005: four-year-old season ===
Sweep Tosho did not appear in 2005 until 8 May when she took on male opposition in the Listed Miyakooji Stakes at Kyoto and finished fifth behind the colt Keisi Guard. On 5 June at Tokyo she started a 16.6/1 outsider in the Grade I Yasuda Kinen over 1600 metres. In a closely contested finish she produced a strong late run to take second place behind Asakusa Den'En with the Hong Kong challengers Silent Witness and Bullish Luck in third and fourth. Three weeks later she was stepped up in distance for the Grade I Takarazuka Kinen over 2200 metres at Hanshin in which she faced a field which included Zenno Rob Roy, Tap Dance City, Heart's Cry, Still in Love, Admire Groove and the NAR champion Cosmo Bulk. She recorded her second win at the highest level as she held off the late challenge of Heart's Cry to win by a neck with Zenno Rob Roy a length and a quarter back in third.

After a three-month summer break, Sweep Tosho returned for the Mainichi Okan (a trial race for the autumn edition of the Tenno Sho) at Tokyo on 9 October and finished sixth behind Sunrise Pegasus. In the Tenno Sho three weeks later over 2000 metres at the same track she started the 8/1 third favourite and finished fifth of the eighteen runners behind Heavenly Romance, Zenno Rob Roy, Dance In The Mood and Asakusa Den'En, beaten less than two lengths by the winner. On her final appearance of the year, Sweep Tosho returned to all-female competition to make her second attempt to win the Queen Elizabeth II Commemorative Cup and started the 1.8/1 second choice in the betting. Several of her old rivals were in opposition including Admire Groove, Yamanin Alabaster, Yamanin Sucre, Les Clefs d'Or, but her most serious threat appeared to come from the three-year-old Air Messiah, who had won the Shuka Sho in October. She won her second Grade I of the season, and the third of her career, as she prevailed by half a length from Osumi Haruka, with Admire Groove two and a half lengths back in third place. After the race Akio Tsurudome commented "Her form hadn't improved that much since her last run, but she was a lot calmer today. She did a good job of coming out of a jam. She was incredible. I thought we were going to have to settle for second place".

In January 2006 Sweep Tosho won the JRA Award for Best Older Filly or Mare.

=== 2006: five-year-old season ===
Sweep Tosho missed the spring and summer of 2006 before making her first appearance as a five-year-old in the Grade II Kyoto Daishoten over 2400 metres on 8 October. She won that race with a three quarters of a length over the seven-year-old Fast Tateyama and the five-year-old Tosho Knight. She then ran for the second time in the autumn Tenno Sho and finished fifth of the sixteen runners behind Daiwa Major. In November she contested her third consecutive Queen Elizabeth II Cup and finished third behind Kawakami Princess and Fusaichi Pandora, although she was promoted to second when the winner was disqualified. In December she was one of fourteen horses invited to contest the Arima Kinen over 2500 metres at Nakayama Racecourse. She started a 29/1 outsider and finished tenth behind Deep Impact.

=== 2007: six-year-old season ===
Sweep Tosho remained in training as a six-year-old but failed to win in four races. In spring she finished second to Kongo Rikishio in the Milers Cup at Hanshin and then ran unplaced behind Koiuta in the Grade I Victoria Mile. After five months off the track she returned in October and was dropped in distance to finish fourth behind Super Hornet in the Grade II Swan Stakes over 1400 metres at Kyoto. She ended her racing career by running for the fourth time in the Queen Elizabeth II Cup on 11 November. She finished third of the thirteen runners behind Daiwa Scarlet and Fusaichi Pandora, beaten two lengths by the winner.

== Racing form ==
Sweep Tosho won eight races and placed in another six out of 24 starts. This data is available based on JBIS and netkeiba.

| Date | Racecourse | Race | Grade | Distance (Condition) | Entry | HN | Odds (Favored) | Finish | Time | Margins | Jockey | Winner (Runner-up) |
|---|---|---|---|---|---|---|---|---|---|---|---|---|
2003 – two-year-old season
| Oct 18 | Kyoto | 2yo Newcomer | | 1,400 m (Firm) | 18 | 7 | 1.8 (1) | 1st | 1:22.9 | –0.5 | Koichi Tsunoda | (Agnes Raspberry) |
| Nov 9 | Kyoto | Fantasy Stakes | 3 | 1,400 m (Firm) | 12 | 1 | 3.5 (2) | 1st | 1:22.6 | –0.2 | Koichi Tsunoda | (Royal Selangor) |
| Dec 7 | Hanshin | Hanshin Juvenile Fillies | 1 | 1,600 m (Firm) | 18 | 4 | 2.1 (1) | 5th | 1:36.1 | 0.2 | Koichi Tsunoda | Yamanin Sucre |
2004 – three-year-old season
| Jan 18 | Kyoto | Kobai Stakes | OP | 1,400 m (Firm) | 11 | 6 | 1.3 (1) | 1st | 1:21.9 | –0.1 | Koichi Tsunoda | (Daiwa El Cielo) |
| Mar 6 | Hanshin | Tulip Sho | 3 | 1,600 m (Firm) | 15 | 13 | 1.8 (1) | 1st | 1:35.5 | –0.1 | Kenichi Ikezoe | (Azuma Sanders) |
| Apr 11 | Hanshin | Oka Sho | 1 | 1,600 m (Firm) | 18 | 4 | 3.8 (2) | 5th | 1:34.5 | 0.9 | Kenichi Ikezoe | Dance in the Mood |
| May 23 | Tokyo | Yushun Himba | 1 | 2,400 m (Good) | 18 | 1 | 13.8 (4) | 2nd | 2:27.3 | 0.1 | Kenichi Ikezoe | Daiwa El Cielo |
| Sep 19 | Hanshin | Rose Stakes | 2 | 2,000 m (Firm) | 12 | 4 | 2.7 (2) | 3rd | 1:59.1 | 0.1 | Kenichi Ikezoe | Les Clefs d'Or |
| Oct 17 | Kyoto | Shuka Sho | 1 | 2,000 m (Firm) | 18 | 11 | 5.0 (2) | 1st | 1:58.4 | –0.1 | Kenichi Ikezoe | (Yamanin Sucre) |
| Nov 14 | Kyoto | QEII Cup | 1 | 2,200 m (Firm) | 18 | 7 | 3.3 (1) | 5th | 2:13.9 | 0.3 | Kenichi Ikezoe | Admire Groove |
2005 – four-year-old season
| May 8 | Kyoto | Miyakooji Stakes | OP | 1,600 m (Firm) | 14 | 7 | 2.7 (1) | 5th | 1:34.6 | 0.3 | Kenichi Ikezoe | Keiai Guard |
| Jun 5 | Tokyo | Yasuda Kinen | 1 | 1,600 m (Firm) | 18 | 11 | 17.6 (10) | 2nd | 1:32.3 | 0.0 | Kenichi Ikezoe | Asakusa Den'en |
| Jun 26 | Hanshin | Takarazuka Kinen | 1 | 2,200 m (Firm) | 15 | 11 | 38.5 (11) | 1st | 2:11.5 | 0.0 | Kenichi Ikezoe | (Heart's Cry) |
| Oct 9 | Tokyo | Mainichi Okan | 2 | 1,800 m (Good) | 17 | 13 | 5.5 (2) | 6th | 1:47.1 | 0.6 | Kenichi Ikezoe | Sunrise Pegasus |
| Oct 30 | Tokyo | Tenno Sho (Autumn) | 1 | 2,000 m (Firm) | 18 | 14 | 9.0 (4) | 5th | 2:00.4 | 0.3 | Kenichi Ikezoe | Heavenly Romance |
| Nov 13 | Kyoto | QEII Cup | 1 | 2,200 m (Firm) | 18 | 8 | 2.8 (2) | 1st | 2:12.5 | –0.1 | Kenichi Ikezoe | (Osumi Haruka) |
2006 – five-year-old season
| Oct 8 | Kyoto | Kyoto Daishoten | 2 | 2,400 m (Firm) | 11 | 9 | 5.1 (2) | 1st | 2:31.5 | –0.1 | Kenichi Ikezoe | (Fast Tateyama) |
| Oct 29 | Tokyo | Tenno Sho (Autumn) | 1 | 2,000 m (Firm) | 16 | 7 | 3.9 (1) | 5th | 1:59.2 | 0.4 | Kenichi Ikezoe | Daiwa Major |
| Nov 12 | Kyoto | QEII Cup | 1 | 2,200 m (Firm) | 15 | 8 | 2.9 (2) | 2nd | 2:11.6 | 0.0 | Kenichi Ikezoe | Fusaichi Pandora |
| Dec 24 | Nakayama | Arima Kinen | 1 | 2,500 m (Firm) | 14 | 6 | 29.6 (5) | 10th | 2:32.9 | 1.0 | Kenichi Ikezoe | Deep Impact |
2007 – six-year-old season
| Apr 14 | Hanshin | Yomiuri Milers Cup | 2 | 1,600 m (Firm) | 15 | 6 | 6.1 (2) | 2nd | 1:32.4 | 0.2 | Kenichi Ikezoe | Kongo Rikishio |
| May 13 | Tokyo | Victoria Mile | 1 | 1,600 m (Firm) | 18 | 7 | 4.0 (2) | 9th | 1:33.2 | 0.7 | Kenichi Ikezoe | Koiuta |
| Oct 27 | Kyoto | Swan Stakes | 2 | 1,400 m (Good) | 18 | 2 | 9.4 (4) | 4th | 1:21.1 | 0.4 | Kenichi Ikezoe | Super Hornet |
| Nov 11 | Kyoto | QEII Cup | 1 | 2,200 m (Firm) | 13 | 4 | 6.6 (2) | 3rd | 2:12.2 | 0.3 | Kenichi Ikezoe | Daiwa Scarlet |

Legend:
Turf

== Breeding record ==
Sweep Tosho was retired from racing to become a broodmare for her owner's stud, producing 10 foals during this time. She died of colic on December 5, 2020, at the age of 19. She was pregnant with a foal by Suave Richard at the time, which did not survive.

c = colt, f = filly

| No. | Name | Foaled | Sex | Color | Sire | Races | Wins | Remarks |
|---|---|---|---|---|---|---|---|---|
| 1st | Jewel Tosho | 2009 | f | Bay | Agnes Tachyon | 14 | 3 | Broodmare |
| | (infertility) | 2010 | | | Daiwa Major | | | |
| 2nd | Bijou Tosho | 2011 | f | Chesnut | Deep Sky | 11 | 1 | Broodmare |
| 3rd | Regatta | 2012 | c | Bay | Deep Impact | 3 | 1 | Retired |
| 4th | Tosho Victor | 2013 | c | Bay | Stay Gold | 11 | 1 | Retired |
| 5th | Seize Dreams | 2014 | c | Bay | Deep Impact | 24 | 4 | Broodsire |
| 6th | (unnamed) | 2015 | c | Chesnut | Orfevre | | | Did not run |
| 7th | Sweep Celeritas | 2016 | f | Bay | Heart's Cry | 16 | 4 | Broodmare |
| 8th | Clean Sweep | 2018 | f | Bay | Duramente | 7 | 3 | Broodmare |
| 9th | Piedra de Luna | 2019 | f | Bay | Kitasan Black | 1 | 0 | Broodmare |
| 10th | Sweep Awards | 2020 | c | Bay | Deep Impact | 19 | 3 | Active |
| | (died while in pregnancy) | | | | Suave Richard | | | |

== In popular culture ==
An anthropomorphized version of Sweep Tosho appears as a character in the Japanese multimedia franchise Umamusume: Pretty Derby, voiced by Shiori Sugiura. She is depicted as a self-proclaimed witch who calls herself "Magical Girl Sweepy", and aspires to be a witch like her grandmother, even going so far as to believe that she can attain mastery of magic by winning races. Similar to the personality of her real-life counterpart, she is also extremely sensitive, stubborn, arrogant, ill-tempered, and disobedient, and oftentimes refuses to listen to her instructors, seniors, and the player trainer, making her one of the more difficult trainees to use in the game.

== Pedigree ==
Pedigree of Sweep Tosho (JPN), bay mare, 2001
| Sire End Sweep (USA) 1991 | Forty Niner (USA); 1985 | Mr Prospector (USA) | Raise A Native (USA) |
| Sire End Sweep (USA) 1991 | Forty Niner (USA); 1985 | Mr Prospector (USA) | Gold Digger (USA) |
| Sire End Sweep (USA) 1991 | Forty Niner (USA); 1985 | File (USA) | Tom Rolfe (USA) |
| Sire End Sweep (USA) 1991 | Forty Niner (USA); 1985 | File (USA) | Continue (USA) |
| Sire End Sweep (USA) 1991 | Broom Dance (USA); 1979 | Dance Spell (USA) | Northern Dancer (CAN) |
| Sire End Sweep (USA) 1991 | Broom Dance (USA); 1979 | Dance Spell (USA) | Obeah (USA) |
| Sire End Sweep (USA) 1991 | Broom Dance (USA); 1979 | Witching Hour (USA) | Thinking Cap (USA) |
| Sire End Sweep (USA) 1991 | Broom Dance (USA); 1979 | Witching Hour (USA) | Enchanted Eve (USA) |
| Dam Tabatha Tosho (JPN) 1993 | Dancing Brave (USA); 1983 | Lyphard (USA) | Northern Dancer (CAN) |
| Dam Tabatha Tosho (JPN) 1993 | Dancing Brave (USA); 1983 | Lyphard (USA) | Goofed (USA) |
| Dam Tabatha Tosho (JPN) 1993 | Dancing Brave (USA); 1983 | Navajo Princess (USA) | Drone (USA) |
| Dam Tabatha Tosho (JPN) 1993 | Dancing Brave (USA); 1983 | Navajo Princess (USA) | Olmec (USA) |
| Dam Tabatha Tosho (JPN) 1993 | Samantha Tosho (JPN); 1985 | Tosho Boy (JPN) | Tesco Boy (GB) |
| Dam Tabatha Tosho (JPN) 1993 | Samantha Tosho (JPN); 1985 | Tosho Boy (JPN) | Social Butterfly (USA) |
| Dam Tabatha Tosho (JPN) 1993 | Samantha Tosho (JPN); 1985 | Marble Tosho (JPN) | Dandy Lute (FR) |
| Dam Tabatha Tosho (JPN) 1993 | Samantha Tosho (JPN); 1985 | Marble Tosho (JPN) | China Tosho (JPN) (Family:5-j) |

- Sweep Tosho was inbred 4 × 4 to Northern Dancer, meaning that this stallion appeared twice in the fourth generation of her pedigree.
