= Daiwa El Cielo =

Japanese-bred Thoroughbred racehorse

Daiwa El Cielo; ダイワエルシエーロ
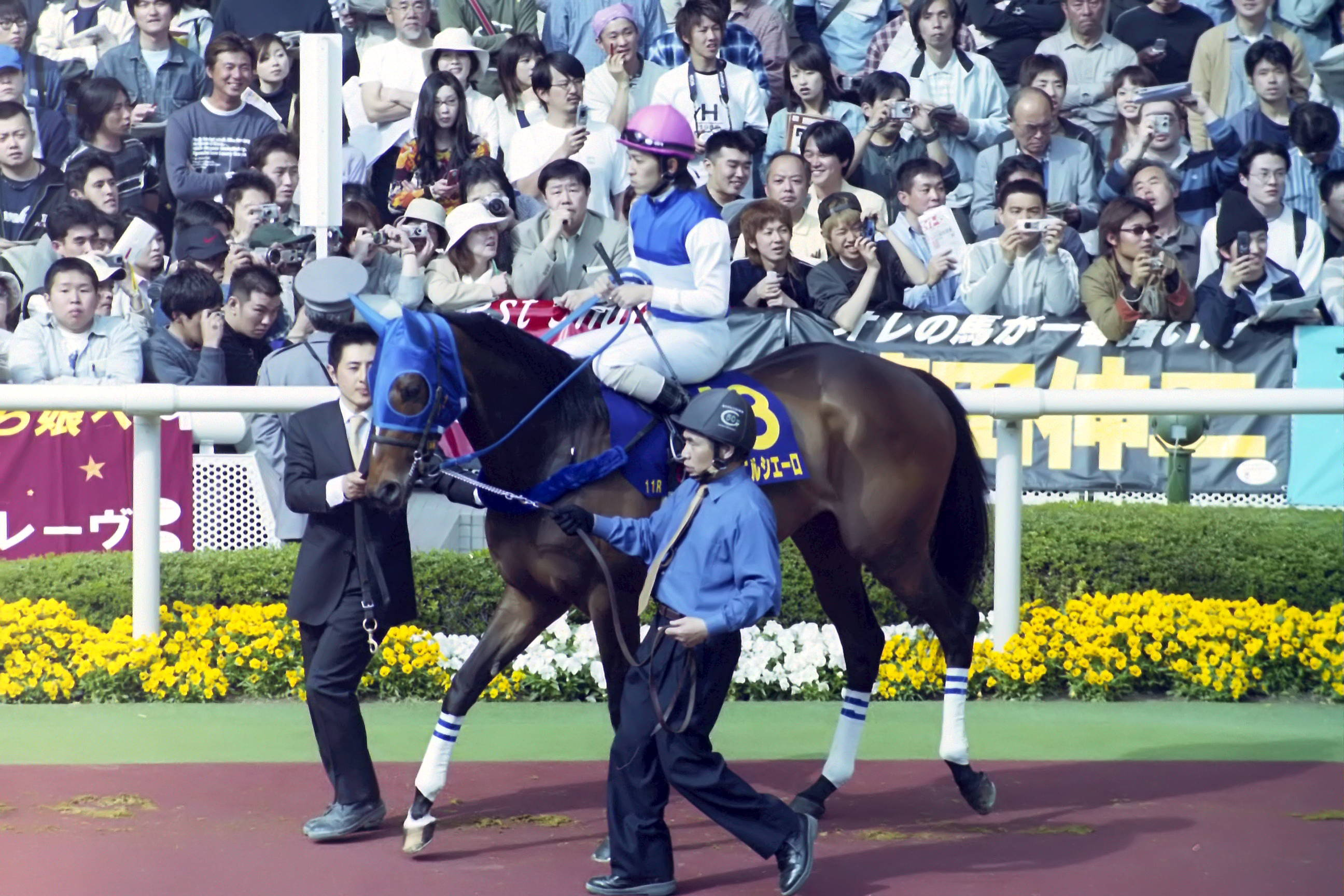
- Daiwa El Cielo at 2004 Oka Sho paddock
- Breed: Thoroughbred
- Sire: Sunday Silence
- Grandsire: Halo
- Dam: London Bridge
- Damsire: Dr. Devious
- Sex: Mare
- Foaled: 11 May 2001
- Country: Japan
- Colour: Bay
- Breeder: Shimokawabe Ranch
- Owner: Keizo Oshiro
- Racing colours
- Trainer: Kunihide Matsuda
- Jockey: Yuichi Fukunaga
- Record: 13: 5-1-1
- Earnings: ¥281,754,000

Major wins
- Daily Hai Queen Cup (2004); Keihan Hai (2004); Mermaid Stakes (2005); Japanese Classic Tiara Race wins: Yushun Himba (2004)
- Last updated on 10 August 2026

Daiwa El Cielo (Japanese: ダイワエルシエーロ, Daiwa eru shiēro; foaled 11 May 2001) is a retired Japanese Thoroughbred racehorse and broodmare. She was a horse that famously won the 2004 Yushun Himba as the sixth favourite for the day. She also won a few more graded stakes such as the Daily Hai Queen Cup, Keihan Hai, and closing out her career with a win at the Mermaid Stakes before safely retiring and moving on to broodmare duty.

== Background ==
Daiwa El Cielo was foaled out of London Bridge, who won the 1997 Fantasy Stakes and finished second behind Phalaenopsis at the 1998 Oka Sho. Her dam herself was sired by Dr. Devious, the winner of the 1991 Dewhurst Stakes and 1992 Epsom Derby. Meanwhile, the horse itself was sired by the 1989 Kentucky Derby and Preakness Stakes winner who was the thirteen time Leading sire in Japan, Sunday Silence.

She was owned by Keizo Oshiro, a horse owner who used Daiwa as his stable name. Her name came from the combination of the stable name and also El Cielo – a Spanish phrase that loosely means heaven or sky.

== Racing career ==
=== 2003: two-year-old season ===
Daiwa El Cielo made her debut on 28 December in the fifth race at the Hanshin Racecourse. She took the lead from the start and held off the rest of the field in the straight to win the race.

=== 2004: three-year-old season ===
The second race of her career would be the Kobai Stakes in January at the Kyoto Racecourse. In this race, she would be narrowly defeated at the finish line by Sweep Tosho and ended up in second place. In the preparation leading up to her first-ever graded stakes race, the Queen Cup, Matsuda, who is her trainer, stated that he saw that the horse was capable of starting well from the gate and positioning herself on the front early. This approach turned out well for her on the race day as she surged from fourth position to the lead in the straight to win the race by one-and-a-quarter lengths ahead of the second place finisher, Crystal Violet. This race qualified her for her first classic race, the Oka Sho on 11 April. Despite a good run at the start, she failed to impress and faded out as the race went on, finishing in seventh place, seven-and-three-quarters length behind Dance in the Mood.

One month later, she would run at the second leg of the classic tiara race which was the Yushun Himba at the Tokyo Racecourse. Before the race started, his main jockey, Yuichi Fukunaga stated that he decided to take a front-running strategy, let the horse go as it pleased and would try to win from the get go. When the gates opened, Daiwa El Cielo started well from her gate and positioned herself behind the front-running horse of the day, Winglet. The race pace turned out to be slow, but it did not affect her running rhythm. Entering the backstretch, Winglet lost composure at the front and veered outwards, allowing Daiwa El Cielo to make a move for the race lead. Meanwhile, Sweep Tosho, who settled at the back, used the outside track and sped up in the final phase to cut the lead created by Daiwa El Cielo whilst Dance in The Mood struggled in the mid-pack but was able to follow up the move. Both horses closed in as much as they could, but they ran out of ground, which saw Daiwa El Cielo finished first and won by three-quarters of a length over Sweep Tosho, while Yamanin Alabaster succeeded in stealing the last podium places over Dance in the Mood in the dying seconds. This was the first Yushun Himba victory for both Fukunaga and Matsuda in their career.

She was rested and prepared for the second half of the season at the Rose Stakes in September. As usual, she tracked on the lead for the majority of the race but was unable to extend her advantage in the final phase, falling down the order in the straight and finishing in seventh place on the day. Due to poor finishing, she skipped the final leg of the tiara race, Shuka Sho and opted for a comeback at the Keihan Hai in November. In this race, she took the lead from the start, pulled away from the rest of the field halfway down the straight, won by one-and-a-half lengths over Company and snatched her third graded race. In the post-race, Fukunaga commented, "She ran at an easy pace and stretched out well to the finish. Last time she was a bit tense after a break, but today she was calm. She is a GI winner, after all. She showed her strength." After this win, Matsuda sent her to close the season at the Hanshin Himba Stakes in December. Daiwa El Cielo ran well in the front group at this race but she was overtaken by the eventual winner, Heavenly Romance and Meisho Butler, who both made their move in the final straight, and finished in third place.

=== 2005: four-year-old season ===
In January, the horse restarted her campaign in the new season at the Kyoto Kimpai. She led the race in the early phase before gassing out in the end and finished in ninth place. At the end of the month, Matsuda tried to debut her at the dirt race, which turned out to be the JpnI Kawasaki Kinen where she would be starting from gate 10. The same outcome happened again for the second successive races as she slowed down at the final straight and finished in sixth place despite taking an early lead.

For the next two races, she would run at the Lord Derby Challenge Trophy in April and Aichi Hai in June. She flopped in both races, finishing in 16th place in those two. One month later, she started early on the second half of the campaign, joining the Mermaid Stakes in July. When the race began, Daiwa El Cielo took the lead from the start and pulled away from the rest of the field. She briefly drew the others back between the third and fourth corners, then moved to the center of the track in the straight, easily shaking off the persistently chasing Meine Samantha and crossing the finish line first by one-and-three-quarters lengths. After this race, she would be rested for the whole season and eventually retired from racing on 15 March 2006. Her racehorse registry would also be removed on the same day.

== Racing form ==
Daiwa El Cielo won five races and scored two podium finishes from 13 starts. This data is available based on JBIS and netkeiba.

Date	Racecourse	Race	Grade	Distance (Condition)	Entry	HN	Odds	Finish	Time	Margins	Jockey	Winner (Runner-up)
2003 – two-year-old season
Dec 28	Hanshin	2yo Newcomer		1,600 m (Firm)	14	8	1.9 (1)	1st	1:37.8	–0.2	Yuichi Fukunaga	(Meine Sorceress)
2004 – three-year-old season
Jan 18	Kyoto	Kobai Stakes	OP	1,400 m (Firm)	11	2	9.1 (3)	2nd	1:22.0	0.1	Yuichi Fukunaga	Sweep Tosho
Feb 21	Tokyo	Daily Hai Queen Cup	GIII	1,600 m (Firm)	16	9	2.3 (1)	1st	1:34.3	–0.2	Yuichi Fukunaga	(Crystal Violet)
Apr 11	Hanshin	Oka Sho	GI	1,600 m (Firm)	18	18	9.5 (5)	7th	1:34.7	1.1	Yuichi Fukunaga	Dance in the Mood
May 23	Tokyo	Yushun Himba	GI	2,400 m (Good)	18	13	21.4 (6)	1st	2:27.2	–0.1	Yuichi Fukunaga	(Sweep Tosho)
Sep 19	Hanshin	Rose Stakes	GII	2,000 m (Firm)	12	10	2.5 (1)	7th	1:59.7	0.7	Yuichi Fukunaga	Les Clefs d'Or
Nov 27	Kyoto	Keihan Hai	GIII	1,800 m (Firm)	17	12	16.9 (8)	1st	1:46.3	–0.2	Yuichi Fukunaga	(Company)
Dec 19	Hanshin	Hanshin Himba Stakes	GII	1,600 m (Firm)	16	16	4.5 (2)	3rd	1:34.2	0.2	Yuichi Fukunaga	Heavenly Romance
2005 – four-year-old season
Jan 5	Kyoto	Kyoto Kimpai	GIII	1,600 m (Firm)	16	7	5.7 (2)	9th	1:34.6	0.6	Yuichi Fukunaga	Hat Trick
Jan 26	Kawasaki	Kawasaki Kinen	JpnI	2,100 m (Muddy)	12	10	0.0 (2)	6th	2:15.8	1.6	Yuichi Fukunaga	Time Paradox
Apr 3	Nakayama	Lord Derby Challenge Trophy	GIII	1,600 m (Firm)	16	3	7.1 (5)	16th	1:34.5	2.2	Yuichi Fukunaga	Daiwa Major
Jun 5	Chukyo	Aichi Hai	GIII	2,000 m (Firm)	18	15	10.5 (5)	16th	2:03.1	1.8	Koshiro Take	Meine Sorceress
Jul 10	Hanshin	Mermaid Stakes	GIII	2,000 m (Good)	9	6	4.5 (2)	1st	2:00.5	–0.3	Yuichi Fukunaga	(Meine Samantha)

Legend:
Turf Dirt

== Broodmare career ==
Daiwa El Cielo became a broodmare at Shimokawabe Ranch, her birthplace. She has produced nine foals from 2007 to 2022. After her retirement from broodmare duties, she was sent to Shimokawa Farm and lived out the rest of her life alongside her dam, London Bridge.

=== Breeding record ===
c = colt, f = filly

No.	Name	Year	Sex	Color	Sire	Wins	Races	Remarks
1st	Daiwa Hermosa	2007	f	Bay	Brian's Time	0	6	Retired
2nd	(Daiwa El Cielo 2008)	2008	c		Jungle Pocket			
	(not foaled)	2009			Jungle Pocket			
	(not foaled)	2010			Chichicastenango			
	(not foaled)	2011			Symboli Kris S			
	(not foaled)	2012			King Kamehameha			
3rd	Speir	2013	f	Bay	Jungle Pocket			Did not race, broodmare
	(not foaled)	2014			Empire Maker			
4th	Casa del Cielo	2015	f	Dark Bay	Lord Kanaloa	2	21	Retired, broodmare
5th	Haurvatat	2016	f	Dark Bay	Lord Kanaloa	2	18	Retired, broodmare
6th	Lonsdale Belt	2017	c	Bay	Lord Kanaloa	3	13	Retired, riding horse
	(not foaled)	2018						
	(not foaled)	2019			Lord Kanaloa			
7th	Pleasant London	2020	f	Bay	Lord Kanaloa	3	24	Retired, broodmare
8th	Ho O Amoureuse	2021	f	Chestnut	Rey de Oro	1	22	Retired
9th	Thriving Road	2022	f	Chestnut	Rey de Oro	3	10	Active

== Pedigree ==
Pedigree of Daiwa El Cielo (JPN), bay mare, 2001
Sire Sunday Silence (USA) 1986	Halo (USA); 1969	Hail to Reason	Turn-To
Sire Sunday Silence (USA) 1986	Halo (USA); 1969	Hail to Reason	Nothirdchance
Sire Sunday Silence (USA) 1986	Halo (USA); 1969	Cosmah	Cosmic Bomb
Sire Sunday Silence (USA) 1986	Halo (USA); 1969	Cosmah	Almahmoud
Sire Sunday Silence (USA) 1986	Wishing Well (USA); 1975	Understanding	Promised Land
Sire Sunday Silence (USA) 1986	Wishing Well (USA); 1975	Understanding	Pretty Ways
Sire Sunday Silence (USA) 1986	Wishing Well (USA); 1975	Mountain Flower	Montparnasse
Sire Sunday Silence (USA) 1986	Wishing Well (USA); 1975	Mountain Flower	Edel Weiss
Dam London Bridge (JPN) 1995	Dr. Devious (IRE); 1989	Ahonoora	Lorenzaccio
Dam London Bridge (JPN) 1995	Dr. Devious (IRE); 1989	Ahonoora	Helen Nichols
Dam London Bridge (JPN) 1995	Dr. Devious (IRE); 1989	Rose of Jericho	Alleged
Dam London Bridge (JPN) 1995	Dr. Devious (IRE); 1989	Rose of Jericho	Rose Red
Dam London Bridge (JPN) 1995	All for London (USA); 1982	Danzig	Northern Dancer
Dam London Bridge (JPN) 1995	All for London (USA); 1982	Danzig	Pas de Nom
Dam London Bridge (JPN) 1995	All for London (USA); 1982	Full Card	Damascus
Dam London Bridge (JPN) 1995	All for London (USA); 1982	Full Card	Belle of the Ball (Family 22-b)

- Inbreeding: 4 x 5 to Northern Dancer (Rose Red's sire).
- Her half brother, Big Planet, won the 2005 Arlington Cup and 2006 Kyoto Kimpai. Another half brother, Greater London, won the 2018 Chukyo Kinen.
- Her half sister, Blitz Finale, is the dam of Kiseki (2017 Kikuka-shō) and Big Ribbon (2023 Mermaid Stakes).
