= Yuichi Fukunaga =

Japanese trainer and former jockey (born 1976)

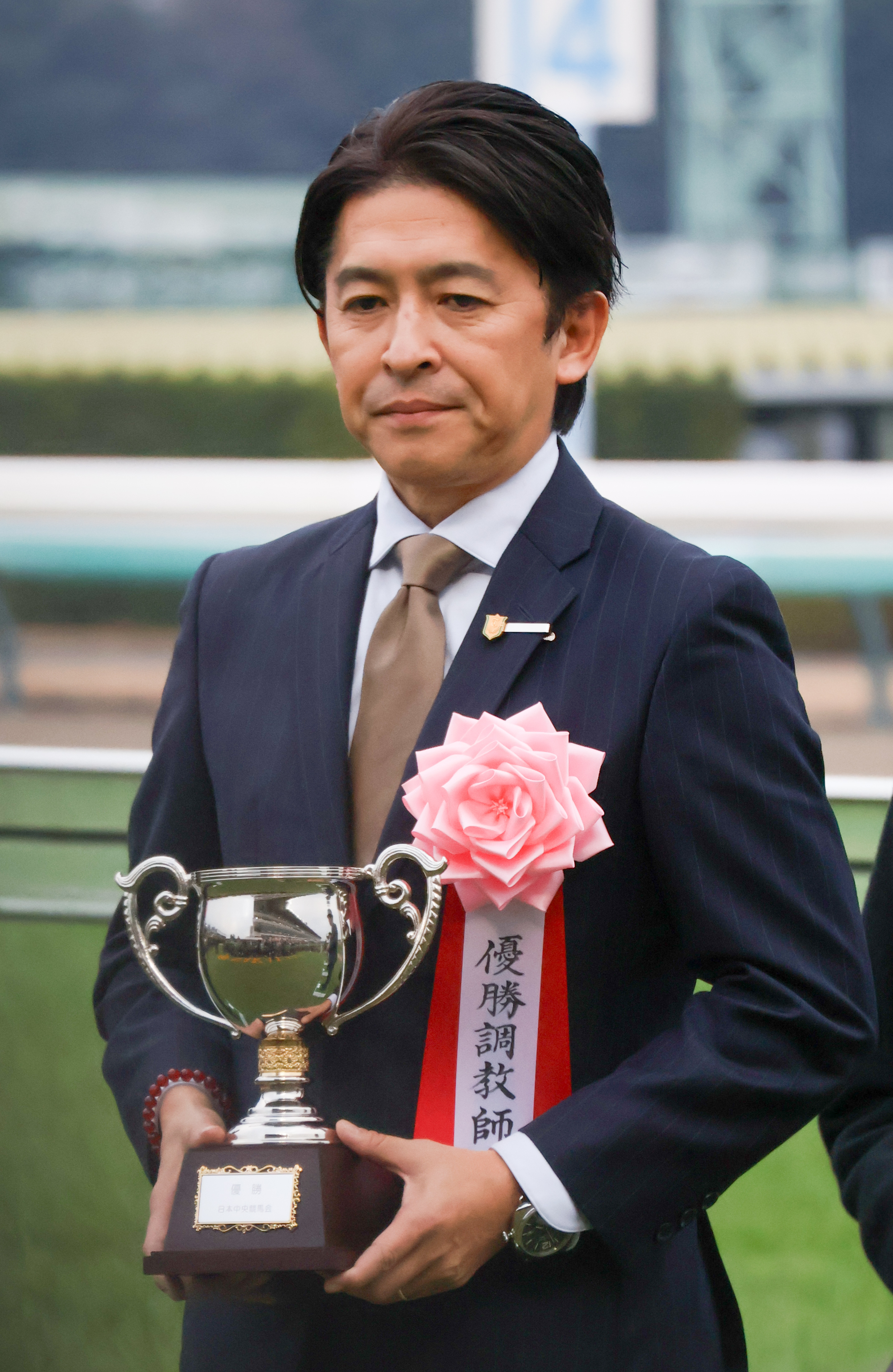
- Fukunaga at the 2025 Turquoise Stakes

Personal information
- Native name: 福永祐一
- Nationality: Japanese
- Born: 9 December 1976 (age 49) Rittō-chō (now Rittō), Kurita District, Shiga
- Occupations: Jockey (retired); Horse trainer
- Height: 160.0 cm (5 ft 3 in)
- Weight: 51.0 kg (112 lb)
- Spouse: Midori Matsuo (m. 2013)
- Children: 3

Horse racing career
- Sport: Horse racing
- Career winnings: 2636

Racing awards
- JRA Award for Best Jockey (winning average) (2011); JRA Award for Best Jockey (races won) (2013); JRA Award for Best Jockey (money earned) (2013); JRA Award for Best Jockey (newcomer) (1996); Most Valuable Jockey (2013)

Significant horses
- King Halo, Eishin Preston, Daiwa El Cielo, Rhein Kraft, Cesario, Epiphaneia, Just A Way, Wagnerian, Indy Champ, Contrail, Pixie Knight, Shahryar, Geoglyph

Yuichi Fukunaga (福永 祐一, Fukunaga Yūichi; born 9 December 1976) is a Japanese horse trainer and former jockey who has won 29 Grade 1 races in Japan and abroad. He is affiliated with the Japan Racing Association (JRA) in Rittō. His father is former jockey Yoichi Fukunaga who was said to be a "genius" during his active career, and his uncle is Takashi Kitamura, also a former jockey. His wife is former Fuji TV announcer Midori Matsuo. Since July 2016, he has a management contract with Horipro together with Yuga Kawada, the entertainment production with which his wife is also affiliated.

On 8 December 2022, following his trainer license being issued by the JRA, Fukunaga announced that he would retire as a jockey at the end of February next year and make a transition in to becoming a horse trainer. Two months later, Fukunaga rode his final races in Japan at the February Stakes on 19 February, and finished his racing career at the Riyadh Dirt Sprint on 25 February, 2023, where he rode Remake which finished 3rd behind Elite Power. Retirement ceremonies of Fukunaga were held at Tokyo Racecourse on 19 February and on the Hanshin Racecourse on 4 March.

Fukunaga officially opened his stable on 6 March 2024. Upon opening his stable, he received a number of horses from outgoing trainers, including Danon Scorpion and Dualist from Takayuki Yasuda. Later that year, Fukunaga won his first group race as a trainer, when he won the CBC Sho with Drop of Light.

12 October 2026 was a particularly successful day for Fukunaga. On that day he won both of the main races of the two JRA race meetings held that day, the October Stakes at Tokyo Racecourse with Ask Sexy More, and the Swan Stakes at Kyoto Racecourse with Diamond Knot. On top of this, he would finish the day off with his first JpnI victory of his trainer career when he won the Mile Championship Nambu Hai with Meisho Hachiro.

== Achievements ==
=== Grade 1 race victories ===
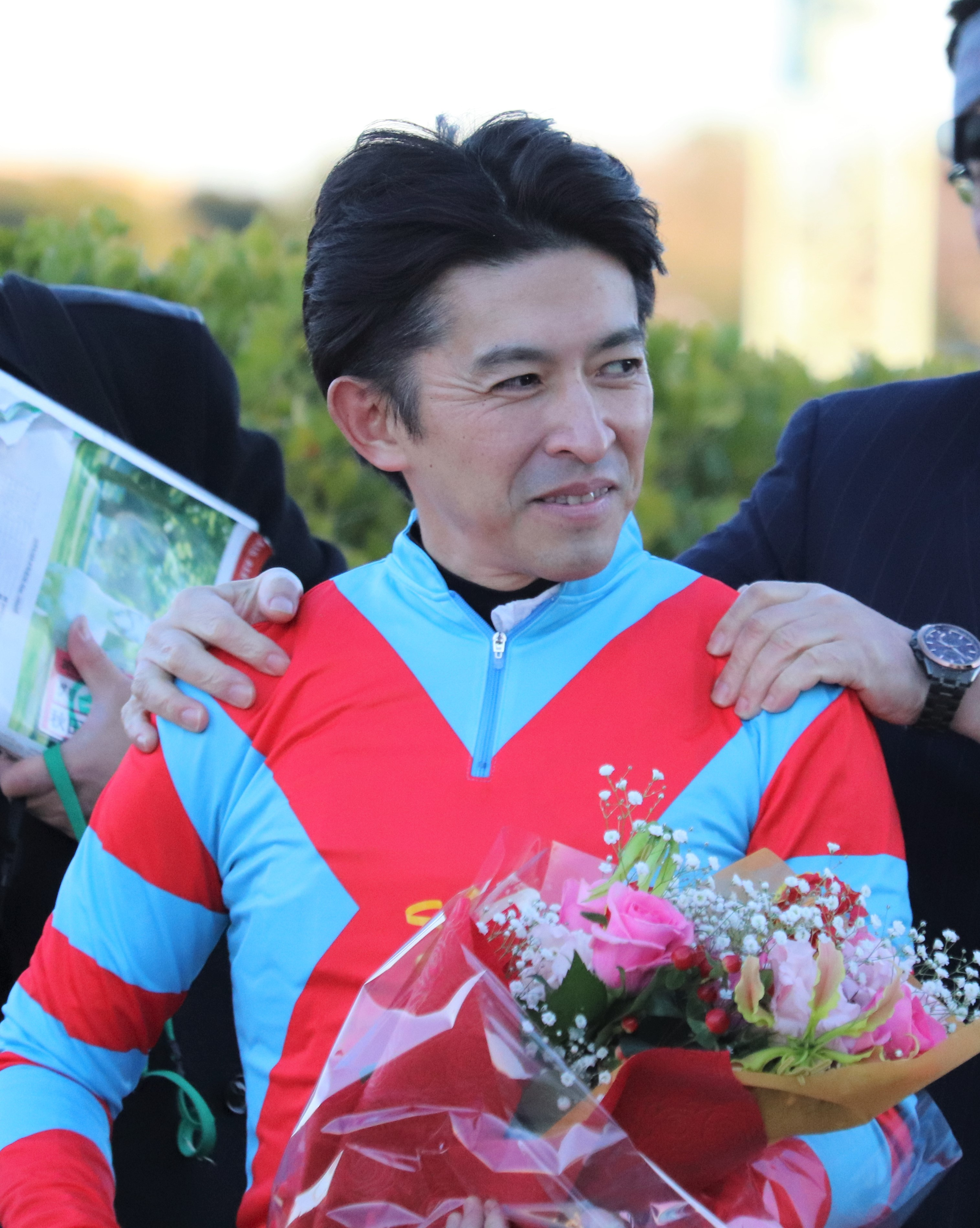
Fukunaga after winning the 2019 Hopeful Stakes

Japan

- Asahi Hai Futurity Stakes - (3) - Eishin Preston (1999), Eishin Champ (2002), Fusaichi Richard (2005)
- February Stakes - (2) - Meisho Bowler (2005), Cafe Pharoah (2022)
- Hanshin Juvenile Fillies - (3) - Peace of World (2002), Reve d'Essor (2010), Joie de Vivre (2011)
- Hopeful Stakes - (1) - Contrail (2019)
- Japan Breeding farms' Cup Classic - (1) - K T Brave (2018)
- Japan Breeding farms' Cup Sprint - (1) - Sterling Rose (2002)
- Japan Cup - (1) - Contrail (2021)
- Kashiwa Kinen - (1) - Wide Pharaoh (2020)
- Kawasaki Kinen - (1) - K T Brave (2018)
- Kikuka Shō - (2) - Epiphaneia (2013), Contrail (2020)
- Mile Championship Nambu Hai - (2) - Best Warrior (2015), Cafe Pharoah (2022)
- NHK Mile Cup - (1) - Rhein Kraft (2005)
- Oka Sho - (2) - Primo Ordine (1999), Rhein Kraft (2005)
- Queen Elizabeth II Commemorative Cup - (1) - Fusaichi Pandora (2006)
- Satsuki Sho - (2) - Contrail (2020), Geoglyph (2022)
- Shuka Sho - (1) - Vivlos (2016)
- Sprinters Stakes - (1) - Pixie Knight (2021)
- Takamatsunomiya Kinen - (3) - Sunningdale (2004), Big Arthur (2016), Mr Melody (2019)
- Teio Sho - (1) - K T Brave (2017)
- Tenno Sho Autumn - (1) - Just A Way (2013)
- Tenno Sho Spring - (1) - World Premiere (2021)
- Tokyo Yūshun - (3) - Wagnerian (2018), Contrail (2020), Shahryar (2021)
- Yasuda Kinen - (2) - Strong Return (2012), Indy Champ (2019)
- Yushun Himba - (3) - Daiwa El Cielo (2004), Cesario (2005), Robe Decollete (2007)

Hong Kong

- Hong Kong Mile - (1) - Eishin Preston (2001)
- Queen Elizabeth II Cup - (2) - Eishin Preston (2002 & 2003)

United States

- American Oaks Invitational Stakes - (1) - Cesario (2005)

United Arab Emirates

- Dubai Duty Free Stakes - (1) - Just A Way (2014)

=== Riding results ===
Riding results are from netkeiba

	Date	Race name	Horse name	Head count	Popularity	Finished
First ride–First victory	2 March 1996	4-Sai Mishōri	Marbutz Brevest	16	1	1st
First group race ride	2 March 1996	Chunichi Shimbun Hai	Oguri One	16	6	15th
First group race victory	22 July 1997	Empress Hai	Silk Phoenix	7	3	1st
First JRA group race victory	15 Nov 1997	Tokyo SportsHai 3-Sai Stakes	King Halo	12	1	1st
First G1 ride	20 October 1996	Shuka Sho	She's Grace	18	12	6th
First G1 victory	11 Apr 1999	Oka Sho	Primo Ordine	18	4	1st

==== Statistics by year ====
Year	1st arrival	2nd arrival	3rd arrival	No. of riders	WP	Confidence ratio	Multiple WP	Recognition
1996	53	49	45	518	.102	.197	.284	JRA Award for Best Jockey (newcomer)
1997	62	59	56	692	.090	.175	.256	
1998	52	52	55	635	.082	.164	.250	Kokura Turf Award
1999	43	39	31	398	.108	.206	.284	
2000	84	71	61	660	.127	.235	.327	Kokura Turf Award
2001	81	68	69	749	.108	.199	.291	
2002	89	62	78	722	.123	.123	.317	JRA Excellent Jockeys Prize
2003	83	78	67	696	.119	.231	.328	
2004	96	81	96	771	.125	.230	.354	JRA Excellent Jockeys Prize; Kokura Turf Award
2005	109	70	81	811	.134	.221	.321	JRA Excellent Jockeys Prize
2006	88	69	87	820	.107	.191	.298	JRA Excellent Jockeys Prize
2007	82	80	67	744	.110	.218	.308	
2008	86	70	86	804	.107	.194	.301	
2009	93	82	89	825	.113	.212	.320	
2010	109	108	82	809	.135	.268	.370	Kansai TV Broadcasting Award; Fair Play Award
2011	133	98	84	824	.161	.280	.382	JRA Award for Best Jockey (winning average); Summer Jockeys Series Victory; Kansai TV Broadcasting Award
2012	115	101	72	741	.155	.291	.389	
2013	131	103	103	844	.155	.277	.399	JRA Award for Best Jockey (races won); JRA Award for Best Jockey (winning average); Most Valuable Jockey; Kansai TV Broadcasting Award
2014	118	111	92	751	.157	.305	.427	
2015	121	112	75	738	.164	.316	.417	Kansai TV Broadcasting Award
2016	106	101	70	703	.151	.294	.394	
2017	116	85	81	740	.157	.272	.381	
2018	103	83	84	689	.149	.270	.392	
2019	107	110	84	713	.150	.304	.422	
2020	134	91	85	698	.192	.322	.444	
2021	123	92	92	687	.179	.313	.447	
2022	101	72	83	610	.166	.284	.418	Kansai Keiba Journalist Club Sho
2023	18	14	19	195	.171	.305	.400	
Total	2636	2211	2064	19497	.135	.249	.354	

=== Training results ===
Training results are from netkeiba

	Date	Race name	Horse name	Head count	Popularity	Finished
First race	9 March 2024	Coral Stakes	Leonore	16	2	2nd
First race win	7 April 2024	1-win allowance	Maruka Blitz	16	4	1st
First group race	13 April 2024	Arlington Cup	Channel Tunnel	16	4	3rd
First JRA group race win	18 August 2024	CBC Sho	Drop of Light	18	6	1
First G1 race	5 May 2024	NHK Mile Cup	Channel Tunnel	18	12	6th
First JpnI victory	12 October 2026	Mile Championship Nambu Hai	Meisho Hachiro	11	3	1st
First G1 victory						

== Magazines ==
- Weekly Playboy "Keiba no Shinzui" (as 2nd author) → "Yuichi Fukunaga no Leading Itchokusen" (both series ended)

== Photo albums ==
- Yuichi Fukunaga (Shot by Eiko Wada. Kodansha, 1997) ISBN 9784062084307

== See also ==
- List of jockeys
